= Laurence Olivier Award for Best Set Designer =

Retired award for London theatre

- Awarded for: Best Set Designer
- Location: England
- Presented by: Society of London Theatre
- First award: 1991
- Final award: 2002
- Website: officiallondontheatre.com/olivier-awards/

The Laurence Olivier Award for Best Set Designer was an annual award presented by the Society of London Theatre in recognition of the "world-class status of London theatre." The awards were established as the Society of West End Theatre Awards in 1976, and renamed in 1984 in honour of English actor and director Laurence Olivier.

The award was introduced in 1991 and retired after the 2002 ceremony.

== Winners and nominees ==
=== 1990s ===
Year	Designer	Production
1991
1991	Mark Thompson	The Wind in the Willows
1991	Tom Cairns	Sunday in the Park with George
1991	William Dudley	Marya
1991	Nigel Lowery	The Illusion
1992
1992	Mark Thompson	The Comedy of Errors and Joseph and the Amazing Technicolor Dreamcoat
1992	Bob Crowley	When She Danced, Murmuring Judges and The Night of the Iguana
1992	Ashley Martin-Davis	The Miser and The Recruiting Officer
1992	Philip Prowse	A Woman of No Importance and The White Devil
1993
1993	Ian MacNeil	An Inspector Calls
1993	Bob Crowley	Carousel, Henry IV, Part 1 and 2 and No Man's Land
1993	Jerome Sirlin	Kiss of the Spider Woman
1993	Robin Wagner	Crazy for You
1994
1994	Mark Thompson	Hysteria
1994	Peter J Davison	Medea
1994	Ian MacNeil	Machinal
1994	Anthony Ward	The Winter's Tale
1995
1995	Stephen Brimson Lewis	Design for Living and Les Parents terribles
1995	Lez Brotherston	Neville's Island
1995	Peter J Davison	Le Cid and Saint Joan
1995	Anthony Ward	Sweet Bird of Youth and The Tempest
1996
1996	John Napier	Burning Blue
1996	John Gunter	Skylight, Absolute Hell and Twelfth Night
1996	Rob Howell	The Glass Menagerie
1996	Anthony Ward	A Midsummer Night's Dream, La Grande Magia and The Way of the World
1997
1997	Tim Hatley	Stanley
1997	John Arnone	Tommy
1997	Paul Farnsworth	Passion
1997	Mark Thompson	'Art'
1998
1998	Tim Goodchild	Three Hours After Marriage
1998	William Dudley	The Homecoming
1998	John Gunter	The Peter Hall Company's Season
1998	Rob Howell	Chips with Everything
1999
1999	Anthony Ward	Oklahoma!
1999	Maria Björnson	Britannicus and Phèdre
1999	William Dudley	Amadeus and Cleo, Camping, Emmanuelle and Dick
1999	Richard Hoover	Not About Nightingales
1999	Mark Thompson	The Blue Room and The Unexpected Man

=== 2000s ===
Year	Designer	Production
2000
2000	Rob Howell	Richard III, Troilus and Cressida and Vassa
2000	Lez Brotherston	Spend, Spend, Spend
2000	Maria Björnson	Plenty
2000	Richard Hudson	The Lion King
2001
2001	William Dudley	All My Sons
2001	Bunny Christie	Baby Doll
2001	Rob Howell	The Caretaker
2001	Brian Thomson	The King and I
2002
2002	Tim Hatley	Humble Boy and Private Lives
2002	Lez Brotherston	The Little Foxes and A Midsummer Night's Dream
2002	Julian Crouch and Graeme Gilmour	Shockheaded Peter
2002	Robin Wagner	Kiss Me, Kate
2002	Anthony Ward	My Fair Lady

== See also ==
- Drama Desk Award for Outstanding Set Design
- Tony Award for Best Scenic Design
