= Tony Award for Best Scenic Design in a Play =

American theatre award for Broadway

Tony Award for Best Scenic Design of a Play
- Awarded for: Best Scenic Design of a Play
- Location: United States New York City
- Presented by: American Theatre Wing The Broadway League
- Currently held by: Chloe Lamford for Death of a Salesman (2026)
- Website: TonyAwards.com

The Tony Award for Best Scenic Design in a Play is an award for outstanding set design of a play. The award was first presented in 1960 after the category of Best Scenic Design was divided into Scenic Design in a Play and Scenic Design in a Musical with each genre receiving its own award. Between 1962 and 2004, the award was re-combined to Best Scenic Design before being split again in 2005.

== Winners and nominees ==
indicates the winner

=== 1960s ===
| Year | Production | Nominees |
|---|---|---|
1960 (14th)
| 1960 (14th) | Toys in the Attic | Howard Bay |
| 1960 (14th) | The Best Man | Jo Mielziner |
| 1960 (14th) | Caligula | Will Steven Armstrong |
| 1960 (14th) | The Miracle Worker | George C. Jenkins |
| 1960 (14th) | The Tenth Man | David Hays |
1961 (15th)
| 1961 (15th) | Becket | Oliver Smith |
| 1961 (15th) | Advise and Consent | Rouben Ter-Arutunian |
| 1961 (15th) | All the Way Home | David Hays |
| 1961 (15th) | The Devil's Advocate | Jo Mielziner |
| 1961 (15th) | Duel of Angels | Roger Furse |

=== 2000s ===
| Year | Production | Nominees |
|---|---|---|
2005 (59th)
| 2005 (59th) | The Pillowman | Scott Pask |
| 2005 (59th) | Doubt | John Lee Beatty |
| 2005 (59th) | Gem of the Ocean | David Gallo |
| 2005 (59th) | Glengarry Glen Ross | Santo Loquasto |
2006 (60th)
| 2006 (60th) | The History Boys | Bob Crowley |
| 2006 (60th) | Awake and Sing! | Michael Yeargan |
| 2006 (60th) | Rabbit Hole | John Lee Beatty |
| 2006 (60th) | Three Days of Rain | Santo Loquasto |
2007 (61st)
| 2007 (61st) | The Coast of Utopia | Bob Crowley and Scott Pask |
| 2007 (61st) | Coram Boy | Ti Green and Melly Still |
| 2007 (61st) | Journey's End | Jonathan Fensom |
| 2007 (61st) | Radio Golf | David Gallo |
2008 (62nd)
| 2008 (62nd) | August: Osage County | Todd Rosenthal |
| 2008 (62nd) | Les Liaisons Dangereuses | Scott Pask |
| 2008 (62nd) | Macbeth | Anthony Ward |
| 2008 (62nd) | The 39 Steps | Peter McKintosh |
2009 (63rd)
| 2009 (63rd) | 33 Variations | Derek McLane |
| 2009 (63rd) | Exit the King | Dale Ferguson |
| 2009 (63rd) | Joe Turner's Come and Gone | Michael Yeargan |
| 2009 (63rd) | The Norman Conquests | Rob Howell |

=== 2010s ===
| Year | Production | Nominees |
|---|---|---|
2010 (64th)
| 2010 (64th) | Red | Christopher Oram |
| 2010 (64th) | Fences | Santo Loquasto |
| 2010 (64th) | Present Laughter | Alexander Dodge |
| 2010 (64th) | The Royal Family | John Lee Beatty |
2011 (65th)
| 2011 (65th) | War Horse | Rae Smith |
| 2011 (65th) | Jerusalem | Ultz |
| 2011 (65th) | The Merchant of Venice | Mark Wendland |
| 2011 (65th) | The Motherfucker With the Hat | Todd Rosenthal |
2012 (66th)
| 2012 (66th) | Peter and the Starcatcher | Donyale Werle |
| 2012 (66th) | Clybourne Park | Daniel Ostling |
| 2012 (66th) | One Man, Two Guvnors | Mark Thompson |
| 2012 (66th) | Other Desert Cities | John Lee Beatty |
2013 (67th)
| 2013 (67th) | The Nance | John Lee Beatty |
| 2013 (67th) | The Assembled Parties | Santo Loquasto |
| 2013 (67th) | Golden Boy | Michael Yeargan |
| 2013 (67th) | Lucky Guy | David Rockwell |
2014 (68th)
| 2014 (68th) | Act One | Beowulf Boritt |
| 2014 (68th) | The Cripple of Inishmaan | Christopher Oram |
| 2014 (68th) | The Glass Menagerie | Bob Crowley |
| 2014 (68th) | Machinal | Es Devlin |
2015 (69th)
| 2015 (69th) | The Curious Incident of the Dog in the Night-Time | Bunny Christie and Finn Ross |
| 2015 (69th) | Skylight | Bob Crowley |
| 2015 (69th) | Wolf Hall Parts One & Two | Christopher Oram |
| 2015 (69th) | You Can't Take It with You | David Rockwell |
2016 (70th)
| 2016 (70th) | The Humans | David Zinn |
| 2016 (70th) | Hughie | Christopher Oram |
| 2016 (70th) | Thérèse Raquin | Beowulf Boritt |
| 2016 (70th) | A View from the Bridge | Jan Versweyveld |
2017 (71st)
| 2017 (71st) | The Play That Goes Wrong | Nigel Hook |
| 2017 (71st) | The Front Page | Douglas W. Schmidt |
| 2017 (71st) | Jitney | David Gallo |
| 2017 (71st) | Oslo | Michael Yeargan |
2018 (72nd)
| 2018 (72nd) | Harry Potter and the Cursed Child | Christine Jones |
| 2018 (72nd) | Angels in America | Ian MacNeil and Edward Pierce |
| 2018 (72nd) | Farinelli and the King | Jonathan Fensom |
| 2018 (72nd) | The Iceman Cometh | Santo Loquasto |
| 2018 (72nd) | Three Tall Women | Miriam Buether |
2019 (73rd)
| 2019 (73rd) | The Ferryman | Rob Howell |
| 2019 (73rd) | Gary: A Sequel to Titus Andronicus | Santo Loquasto |
| 2019 (73rd) | Ink | Bunny Christie |
| 2019 (73rd) | Network | Jan Versweyveld |
| 2019 (73rd) | To Kill a Mockingbird | Miriam Buether |

=== 2020s ===
| Year | Production | Nominees |
|---|---|---|
2020 (74th)
| 2020 (74th) | A Christmas Carol | Rob Howell |
| 2020 (74th) | Betrayal | Soutra Gilmour |
| 2020 (74th) | The Inheritance | Bob Crowley |
| 2020 (74th) | Slave Play | Clint Ramos |
| 2020 (74th) | A Soldier's Play | Derek McLane |
2022 (75th)
| 2022 (75th) | The Lehman Trilogy | Es Devlin |
| 2022 (75th) | American Buffalo | Scott Pask |
| 2022 (75th) | Hangmen | Anna Fleischle |
| 2022 (75th) | POTUS: Or, Behind Every Great Dumbass Are Seven Women Trying to Keep Him Alive | Beowulf Boritt |
| 2022 (75th) | Skeleton Crew | Michael Carnahan and Nicholas Hussong |
| 2022 (75th) | The Skin of Our Teeth | Adam Rigg |
2023 (76th)
| 2023 (76th) | Life of Pi | Tim Hatley and Andrzej Goulding |
| 2023 (76th) | A Christmas Carol | Dane Laffrey and Lucy Mackinnon |
| 2023 (76th) | Good Night, Oscar | Rachel Hauck |
| 2023 (76th) | Leopoldstadt | Richard Hudson |
| 2023 (76th) | Prima Facie | Miriam Buether |
2024 (77th)
| 2024 (77th) | Stereophonic | David Zinn |
| 2024 (77th) | Appropriate | dots |
| 2024 (77th) | An Enemy of the People | dots |
| 2024 (77th) | Jaja's African Hair Braiding | David Zinn |
| 2024 (77th) | Purlie Victorious: A Non-Confederate Romp through the Cotton Patch | Derek McLane |
2025 (78th)
| 2025 (78th) | Stranger Things: The First Shadow | Miriam Buether and 59 Productions |
| 2025 (78th) | English | Marsha Ginsberg |
| 2025 (78th) | Good Night, and Good Luck | Scott Pask |
| 2025 (78th) | The Hills of California | Rob Howell |
| 2025 (78th) | The Picture of Dorian Gray | David Bergman and Marg Horwell |
2026 (79th)
| 2026 (79th) | Death of a Salesman | Chloe Lamford |
| 2026 (79th) | Bug | Takeshi Kata |
| 2026 (79th) | Dog Day Afternoon | David Korins |
| 2026 (79th) | Fallen Angels | David Rockwell |
| 2026 (79th) | Oedipus | Hildegard Bechtler |

== Multiple wins ==
2 Wins

- Bob Crowley
- Rob Howell
- Scott Pask
- David Zinn

== Multiple nominations ==
6 Nominations

- Santo Loquasto

5 Nominations

- John Lee Beatty
- Bob Crowley
- Scott Pask

4 Nominations

- Miriam Buether
- Rob Howell
- Christopher Oram
- Michael Yeargan

3 Nominations

- Beowulf Boritt
- David Gallo
- Derek McLane
- David Rockwell
- David Zinn

2 Nominations

- Bunny Christie
- dots
- Es Devlin
- Jonathan Fensom
- David Hays
- Jo Mielziner
- Todd Rosenthal
- Jan Versweyveld

== See also ==
- Tony Award for Best Scenic Design in a Musical
- Drama Desk Award for Outstanding Scenic Design of a Play
- Laurence Olivier Award for Best Set Design
- List of Tony Award-nominated productions
