= 2013 Laurence Olivier Awards =

Award ceremony

- Date: 28 April 2013
- Location: Royal Opera House
- Hosted by: Hugh Bonneville; Sheridan Smith

Television/radio coverage
- Network: ITV1

The 2013 Laurence Olivier Awards were held on Sunday 28 April 2013 at the Royal Opera House, London. The awards were sponsored by MasterCard for the third consecutive year and presented by Hugh Bonneville and Sheridan Smith, with music from the BBC Concert Orchestra. Live coverage of the awards was provided by BBC Radio 2, commentated by Ken Bruce and for the first time in over a decade, the awards were televised, with a highlights programme on ITV.

== Winners and nominees ==
The nominations were announced on 26 March 2013 in 24 categories.

| Best New Play | Best New Musical |
|---|---|
| The Curious Incident of the Dog in the Night-Time by Simon Stephens, adapted by Mark Haddon – National Theatre Cottesloe / Apollo; The Audience by Peter Morgan – Gielgud; Constellations by Nick Payne – Duke of York's Theatre; This House by James Graham – National Theatre Cottesloe / Olivier | Top Hat – Aldwych; The Bodyguard – Adelphi; Loserville – Garrick; Soul Sister – Savoy |
| Best Revival | Best Musical Revival |
| Long Day's Journey into Night – Apollo; Macbeth – Trafalgar Studios; Old Times – Harold Pinter; Twelfth Night – Globe / Apollo | Sweeney Todd – Adelphi; A Chorus Line – London Palladium; Cabaret – Savoy; Kiss Me, Kate – Old Vic |
Best Entertainment and Family
Goodnight Mister Tom – Phoenix; Cinderella: A Fairytale – St James; Hansel and Gretel – National Theatre Cottesloe; Room on the Broom – Lyric
| Best Actor | Best Actress |
| Luke Treadaway as Christopher Boone in The Curious Incident of the Dog in the Night-Time – National Theatre Cottesloe / Apollo; Rupert Everett as Oscar Wilde in The Judas Kiss – Hampstead / Duke of York's; James McAvoy as Macbeth in Macbeth – Trafalgar Studios; Mark Rylance as Olivia in Twelfth Night – Globe / Apollo; Rafe Spall as Roland in Constellations – Duke of York's theatre | Helen Mirren as Queen Elizabeth II in The Audience – Gielgud; Hattie Morahan as Nora Helmer in A Doll's House – Young Vic; Billie Piper as Connie in The Effect – National Theatre Cottesloe; Kristin Scott Thomas as Anna and Kate in Old Times – Harold Pinter |
| Best Actor in a Musical | Best Actress in a Musical |
| Michael Ball as Sweeney Todd in Sweeney Todd – Adelphi; Alex Bourne as Fred Graham in Kiss Me, Kate – Old Vic; Tom Chambers as Jerry in Top Hat – Aldwych; Will Young as The Master of Ceremonies in Cabaret – Savoy | Imelda Staunton as Mrs. Lovett in Sweeney Todd – Adelphi; Heather Headley as Rachel Marron in The Bodyguard – Adelphi; Summer Strallen as Dale Tremont in Top Hat – Aldwych; Hannah Waddingham as Lilli Vanessi/Kate Minola in Kiss Me, Kate – Old Vic |
| Best Actor in a Supporting Role | Best Actress in a Supporting Role |
| Richard McCabe as Harold Wilson in The Audience – Gielgud; Paul Chahidi as Maria in Twelfth Night – Globe / Apollo; Adrian Scarborough as Jurgen Tesman in Hedda Gabler – Old Vic; Kyle Soller as Edmund in Long Day's Journey into Night – Apollo | Nicola Walker as Judy in The Curious Incident of the Dog in the Night-Time – National Theatre Cottesloe / Apollo; Janie Dee as Miranda in NSFW – Royal Court; Anastasia Hille as Dr. Lorna in The Effect – National Theatre Cottesloe; Cush Jumbo as Mark Antony in Julius Caesar – Donmar Warehouse; Helen McCrory as Libby in The Last of the Haussmans – National Theatre Lyttelton |
Best Supporting Role in a Musical
Leigh Zimmerman as Sheila in A Chorus Line – London Palladium; Adam Garcia as Bill Calhoun in Kiss Me, Kate – Old Vic; Debbie Kurup as Nicki Marron in The Bodyguard – Adelphi; Siân Phillips as Fraulein Schneider in Cabaret – Savoy
| Best Director | Best Theatre Choreographer |
| Marianne Elliott for The Curious Incident of the Dog in the Night-Time – National Theatre Cottesloe / Apollo; Stephen Daldry for The Audience – Gielgud; Jeremy Herrin for This House – National Theatre Cottesloe / Olivier; Simon McBurney for The Master and Margarita – Barbican Theatre | Bill Deamer for Top Hat – Aldwych; Scott Ambler for Chariots of Fire – Hampstead/Gielgud; Scott Graham and Steven Hoggett for The Curious Incident of the Dog in the Night-Time – National Theatre Cottesloe / Apollo; Stephen Mear for Kiss Me, Kate – Old Vic |
| Best Set Design | Best Costume Design |
| Bunny Christie and Finn Ross for The Curious Incident of the Dog in the Night-Time – National Theatre Cottesloe / Apollo; Hildegard Bechtler for Top Hat – Aldwych; Miriam Buether and Wang Gongxin for Wild Swans – Young Vic; Tim Hatley for The Bodyguard – Adelphi | Jon Morrell for Top Hat – Aldwych; Bob Crowley for The Audience – Gielgud; Jenny Tiramani for Twelfth Night – Globe / Apollo; Anthony Ward for Sweeney Todd – Adelphi |
| Best Lighting Design | Best Sound Design |
| Paule Constable for The Curious Incident of the Dog in the Night-Time – National Theatre Cottesloe / Apollo; Paul Anderson for The Master and Margarita – Barbican Theatre; Lee Curran for Constellations – Duke of York's Theatre; Mark Henderson for Sweeney Todd – Adelphi | Ian Dickinson and Adrian Sutton for The Curious Incident of the Dog in the Night-Time – National Theatre Cottesloe / Apollo; Paul Groothuis for Sweeney Todd – Adelphi; David McSeveney and Simon Slater for Constellations – Duke of York's Theatre; Gareth Owen for Top Hat – Aldwych |
| Outstanding Achievement in Dance | Best New Dance Production |
| Marianela Núñez for Aeternum, Diana and Actaeon and Viscera – Royal Ballet, Royal Opera House; Lez Brotherston for costuming and set designing Sleeping Beauty, New Adventures – Sadler's Wells; The Company in Breakin' Convention, ILL-Abilities – Sadler's Wells | Aeternum, Royal Ballet – Royal Opera House; Cacti, Nederlands Dans Theater 2 – Sadler's Wells; A Streetcar Named Desire, Scottish Ballet – Sadler's Wells |
| Outstanding Achievement in Opera | Best New Opera Production |
| Bryan Hymel in Les Troyens, Robert le diable and Rusalka – Royal Opera House; Edward Gardner for conducting Billy Budd and The Flying Dutchman – London Coliseum; Ghost Patrol and In the Locked Room, Music Theatre Wales / Scottish Opera – Linbury Studio, Royal Opera House; The Stage Managers, English National Opera – London Coliseum / Royal Opera House | Einstein on the Beach – Barbican; Billy Budd, English National Opera – London Coliseum; Caligula, English National Opera – London Coliseum; La traviata, English National Opera – London Coliseum |
Outstanding Achievement in Affiliate Theatre
The season of new writing – Jerwood Theatre Upstairs, Royal Court; Kate Bond and Morgan Lloyd for devising You Me Bum Bum Train – Theatre Royal Stratford East; Caroline Horton for writing You're Not Like the Other Girls Chrissy – Bush; Red Velvet – Tricycle
Audience Award
Billy Elliot; Matilda; The Phantom of the Opera; Wicked
Society Special Award
Michael Frayn; Gillian Lynne

== Guest performers ==
- Michael Ball, performing "Love Changes Everything" from Aspects of Love
- Tade Biesinger, performing "Electricity" from the musical Billy Elliot
- Petula Clarke, performing "With One Look" from the musical Sunset Boulevard
- Heather Headley, performing "I Will Always Love You" from the musical The Bodyguard
- Idina Menzel, performing "That's How I Say Goodbye" and "Don't Rain on My Parade"
- Tim Minchin, performing "My House" from Matilda the Musical (not televised)
- Matthew Morrison, performing a medley from West Side Story
- Sheridan Smith, performing "Diamonds Are a Girl's Best Friend"
- Cast of Top Hat
- Cast of Cabaret
- Cast of A Chorus Line
- Cast of the UK tour of Cats

== Productions with multiple nominations and awards ==
The following 18 productions, including three operas, received multiple nominations:

- 8: The Curious Incident of the Dog in the Night-Time
- 7: Top Hat
- 6: Sweeney Todd
- 5: The Audience and Kiss Me, Kate
- 4: The Bodyguard, Constellations and Twelfth Night
- 3: Cabaret
- 2: Apollo/Aeternum/24 Preludes, Billy Budd, A Chorus Line, The Effect, Long Day's Journey into Night, Macbeth, The Master and Margarita, Old Times and This House

The following five productions received multiple awards:

- 7: The Curious Incident of the Dog in the Night-Time
- 3: Sweeney Todd and Top Hat
- 2: Apollo/Aeternum/24 Preludes and The Audience

== See also ==
- 67th Tony Awards — equivalent awards for Broadway theatre productions
