= Laurence Olivier Award for Best Set Design =

Annual award for London theatre

- Awarded for: Best Set Design
- Location: England
- Presented by: Society of London Theatre
- Currently held by: Tom Pye (set design) and Ash J Woodward (video design) for Paddington: The Musical (2026)
- Website: officiallondontheatre.com/olivier-awards/

The Laurence Olivier Award for Best Set Design is an annual award presented by the Society of London Theatre in recognition of the "world-class status of London theatre." The awards were established as the Society of West End Theatre Awards in 1976, and renamed in 1984 in honour of English actor and director Laurence Olivier.

The award originated as a single award for Designer of the Year in 1976 before being renamed as Best Set Design in 1991 with the introduction of awards for Best Costume Design and Best Lighting Design. In 2004, the award for Best Sound Design was introduced.

== Winners and nominees ==
=== 1970s ===
Year	Designer	Production
1976
1976	Abd'Elkader Farrah	Henry IV and Henry V
1976	Eileen Diss	The Family Dance
1976	Ralph Koltai	Old World and Wild Oats
1976	Alan Tagg	Confusions
1977
1977	John Napier	King Lear
1977	John Bury	Volpone
1977	Tazeena Firth and Timothy O'Brien	Tales from the Vienna Woods
1977	Ralph Koltai	Rosmersholm
1978
1978	Ralph Koltai	Brand
1978	Eileen Diss	The Homecoming
1978	Abd'Elkader Farrah	Henry VI
1978	Tanya Moiseiwitsch	The Double Dealer
1979
1979	William Dudley	Undiscovered Country
1979	John Bury	Strife
1979	John Napier	Once in a Lifetime
1979	Carl Toms	For Services Rendered

=== 1980s ===
Year	Designer	Production
1980
1980	Dermot Hayes and John Napier	Nicholas Nickleby
1980	John Bury	Amadeus
1980	John Gunter	Juno and the Paycock
1980	Jocelyn Herbert	Life of Galileo
1981
1981	Carl Toms	The Provoked Wife
1981	Eileen Diss	Measure for Measure
1981	John Napier	Cats
1981	Saul Radomsky	Tonight at 8.30
1982
1982	John Gunter	Guys and Dolls
1982	Abd'Elkader Farrah	Poppy
1982	Carl Toms	Windy City
1982	Ultz	The Twin Rivals
1983
1983	Ralph Koltai	Cyrano de Bergerac
1983	John Gunter	The Rivals
1983	John Napier	Peter Pan
1983	Carl Toms	The Real Thing
1984
1984	John Gunter	Wild Honey
1984	Voytek Dolinski and Michael Levine	Strange Interlude
1984	John Napier	Starlight Express
1984	Carl Toms	The Aspern Papers
1985
1985	William Dudley	The Mysteries
1985	Alison Chitty	Martine and She Stoops to Conquer
1985	Bob Crowley	Henry V, Love's Labour's Lost and The Winter's Tale
1985	Philip Prowse	The Duchess of Malfi
1986
1986	William Dudley	Futurists
1986	Maria Björnson	The Phantom of the Opera
1986	Bob Crowley	As You Like It and Les liaisons dangereuses
1986	Carl Toms	Dalliance and The Magistrate
1987
1987	Lucio Fanti	The Hairy Ape
1987	Bob Crowley	A Penny for a Song and Macbeth
1987	William Dudley	Girlfriends, Kiss Me, Kate and Richard II
1987	Kappa Senoh	Macbeth
1988
1988	Richard Hudson	Andromache, Bussy D'Ambois, Candide, One Way Pendulum, The Tempest and Too Clever by Half
1988	William Dudley	Bartholomew Fair, Cat on a Hot Tin Roof, The Changeling, The Shaughraun and Waiting for Godot
1988	Nick Ormerod	A Family Affair, Philoctetes and The Tempest
1988	Mark Thompson	Measure for Measure and The Wizard of Oz

=== 1990s ===
Year	Designer	Production
1990
1990	Bob Crowley	Ghetto, Hedda Gabler, Ma Rainey's Black Bottom and The Plantagenets
1990	The Design Team	Suicide for Love
1990	Chris Dyer	The Merchant of Venice and The Wars of the Roses
1990	John Napier	Miss Saigon
1991
1991	Mark Thompson	The Wind in the Willows
1991	Tom Cairns	Sunday in the Park with George
1991	William Dudley	Marya
1991	Nigel Lowery	The Illusion
1992
1992	Mark Thompson	The Comedy of Errors and Joseph and the Amazing Technicolor Dreamcoat
1992	Bob Crowley	When She Danced, Murmuring Judges and The Night of the Iguana
1992	Ashley Martin-Davis	The Miser and The Recruiting Officer
1992	Philip Prowse	A Woman of No Importance and The White Devil
1993
1993	Ian MacNeil	An Inspector Calls
1993	Bob Crowley	Carousel, Henry IV and No Man's Land
1993	Jerome Sirlin	Kiss of the Spider Woman
1993	Robin Wagner	Crazy for You
1994
1994	Mark Thompson	Hysteria
1994	Peter J. Davison	Medea
1994	Ian MacNeil	Machinal
1994	Anthony Ward	The Winter's Tale
1995
1995	Stephen Brimson Lewis	Design for Living and Les Parents terribles
1995	Lez Brotherston	Neville's Island
1995	Peter J. Davison	Le Cid and Saint Joan
1995	Anthony Ward	Sweet Bird of Youth and The Tempest
1996
1996	John Napier	Burning Blue
1996	John Gunter	Skylight, Absolute Hell and Twelfth Night
1996	Rob Howell	The Glass Menagerie
1996	Anthony Ward	A Midsummer Night's Dream, La Grande Magia and The Way of the World
1997
1997	Tim Hatley	Stanley
1997	John Arnone	Tommy
1997	Paul Farnsworth	Passion
1997	Mark Thompson	'Art'
1998
1998	Tim Goodchild	Three Hours After Marriage
1998	William Dudley	The Homecoming
1998	John Gunter	The Peter Hall Company's Season
1998	Rob Howell	Chips with Everything
1999
1999	Anthony Ward	Oklahoma!
1999	Maria Björnson	Britannicus and Phèdre
1999	William Dudley	Amadeus and Cleo, Camping, Emmanuelle and Dick
1999	Richard Hoover	Not About Nightingales
1999	Mark Thompson	The Blue Room and The Unexpected Man

=== 2000s ===
Year	Designer	Production
2000
2000	Rob Howell	Richard III, Troilus and Cressida and Vassa
2000	Maria Björnson	Plenty
2000	Lez Brotherston	Spend Spend Spend
2000	Richard Hudson	The Lion King
2001
2001	William Dudley	All My Sons
2001	Bunny Christie	Baby Doll
2001	Rob Howell	The Caretaker
2001	Brian Thomson	The King and I
2002
2002	Tim Hatley	Humble Boy and Private Lives
2002	Lez Brotherston	The Little Foxes and A Midsummer Night's Dream
2002	Julian Crouch and Graeme Gilmour	Shockheaded Peter
2002	Robin Wagner	Kiss Me, Kate
2002	Anthony Ward	My Fair Lady
2003
2003	Bunny Christie	A Streetcar Named Desire
2003	Lez Brotherston	Play Without Words
2003	William Dudley	The Coast of Utopia
2003	Anthony Ward	Chitty Chitty Bang Bang
2004
2004	William Dudley	Hitchcock Blonde
2004	Bob Crowley	Mourning Becomes Electra
2004	Franco Zeffirelli	Absolutely! (Perhaps)
2005
2005	Giles Cadle	His Dark Materials
2005	Bob Crowley	Mary Poppins
2005	William Dudley	The Woman in White
2005	Ian MacNeil	Festen
2005	Christopher Oram	Suddenly, Last Summer
2006
2006	Rob Howell	Hedda Gabler
2006	Ian MacNeil	Billy Elliot
2006	Christopher Oram	Don Carlos
2007
2007	David Farley and Timothy Bird	Sunday in the Park with George
2007	Tim Hatley	Spamalot
2007	Eugene Lee	Wicked
2008
2008	Rae Smith and Handspring Puppet Company	War Horse
2008	Rob Howell	The Lord of the Rings
2008	David Rockwell	Hairspray
2008	Anthony Ward and Lorna Heavey	Macbeth
2009
2009	Todd Rosenthal	August: Osage County
2009	Paul Brown	Marguerite
2009	Soutra Gilmour	The Collection and The Lover
2009	Neil Murray	Brief Encounter
2009	Tom Piper	The Histories

=== 2010s ===
Year	Designer	Production
2010
2010	Ultz	Jerusalem
2010	Christopher Oram	Red
2010	Mark Thompson	England People Very Nice
2010	Anthony Ward	ENRON
2011
2011	Bunny Christie	The White Guard
2011	Lez Brotherston	Design for Living
2011	Miriam Buether	Earthquakes in London
2011	Bob Crowley	Love Never Dies
2012
2012	Rob Howell	Matilda
2012	Rob Howell	Ghost
2012	Michael Taylor	The Ladykillers
2012	Mark Thompson	One Man, Two Guvnors
2013
2013	Bunny Christie and Finn Ross	The Curious Incident of the Dog in the Night-Time
2013	Hildegard Bechtler	Top Hat
2013	Miriam Buether and Wang Gongxin	Wild Swans
2013	Tim Hatley	The Bodyguard
2014
2014	Es Devlin	Chimerica
2014	Bob Crowley	Once
2014	Tim Goodchild	Strangers on a Train
2014	Mark Thompson	Charlie and the Chocolate Factory
2015
2015	Es Devlin	The Nether
2015	Bunny Christie	Made in Dagenham
2015	Rob Jones	City of Angels
2015	Jan Versweyveld	A View from the Bridge
2016
2016	Anna Fleischle	Hangmen
2016	Hildegard Bechtler	Oresteia
2016	Es Devlin	Hamlet
2016	Jonathan Fensom	Farinelli and the King
2017
2017	Christine Jones	Harry Potter and the Cursed Child
2017	Bob Crowley	Aladdin
2017	Bob Crowley	The Glass Menagerie
2017	Rob Howell	Groundhog Day
2018
2018	Bob Crowley and 59 Productions	An American in Paris
2018	Bunny Christie	Ink
2018	Rob Howell	The Ferryman
2018	Vicki Mortimer	Follies
2019
2019	Bunny Christie	Company
2019	Bob Crowley	The Inheritance
2019	Es Devlin	The Lehman Trilogy
2019	Anna Fleischle	Home, I'm Darling

=== 2020s ===
Year	Designer	Production
2020
2020	Bob Crowley	Mary Poppins
2020	Soutra Gilmour	& Juliet
2020	Rae Smith	Rosmersholm
2020	Rae Smith	Uncle Vanya
2021	Not presented due to extended closing of theatre productions during COVID-19 pandemic (Note: Due to late March 2020 to late July 2021 closing of London theatre productions during the COVID-19 pandemic in England, the 2022 awards recognise productions that launched anytime from February 2020 to February 2022)	
2022
2022	Tim Hatley (set design), Nick Barnes and Finn Caldwell (puppet design)	Life of Pi
2022	Tim Hatley (set design) and Finn Ross (video design)	Back to the Future: The Musical
2022	Derek McLane	Moulin Rouge!
2022	Tom Scutt	Cabaret
2023
2023	Tom Pye	My Neighbour Totoro
2023	Miriam Buether	To Kill A Mockingbird
2023	Ben Stones	Standing at the Sky's Edge
2023	Mark Walters	Jack and the Beanstalk
2024
2024	Miriam Buether (set design), 59 Productions (video design)	Stranger Things: The First Shadow
2024	Bunny Christie (set design)	Guys and Dolls
2024	Es Devlin (set design), Ash J Woodward (video design)	Dear England
2024	Soutra Gilmour (set design), Nathan Amzi & Joe Ransom (video design)	Sunset Boulevard
2025
2025	Tom Scutt (set design)	Fiddler on the Roof
2025	Jon Bausor (set design), Toby Olié & Daisy Beattie (puppetry design) & Satoshi Kuriyama (projection design)	Spirited Away
2025	Frankie Bradshaw (set design)	Ballet Shoes
2025	Es Devlin (set design)	Coriolanus

== Individuals with multiple wins ==
=== 5 wins ===
- William Dudley

=== 4 wins ===
- Bunny Christie

=== 3 wins ===
- Bob Crowley
- Tim Hatley
- Rob Howell
- John Napier
- Mark Thompson (2 consecutive)

=== 2 wins ===
- Es Devlin (consecutive)
- John Gunter
- Ralph Koltai

== See also ==
- Drama Desk Award for Outstanding Set Design
- Tony Award for Best Scenic Design
