= 1993 Laurence Olivier Awards =

Edition of London theatre awards

The 1993 Laurence Olivier Awards were held in 1993 in London celebrating excellence in West End theatre by the Society of London Theatre.

== Winners and nominees ==
Details of winners (in bold) and nominees, in each award category, per the Society of London Theatre.

Play of the Year	Best New Musical
**Six Degrees of Separation by John Guare – Royal Court / Comedy**; Someone Who'll Watch Over Me by Frank McGuinness – Vaudeville; The Gift of the Gorgon by Peter Shaffer – RSC at the Barbican Pit / Wyndham's; The Street of Crocodiles by Bruno Schulz, adapted by Simon McBurney and Mark Wheathy – National Theatre Cottesloe	**Crazy for You – Prince Edward**; Assassins – Donmar Warehouse; Grand Hotel – Dominion; Kiss of the Spider Woman – Shaftesbury
Best Revival of a Play or Comedy	Best Musical Revival
**An Inspector Calls – National Theatre Lyttelton**; Heartbreak House – Theatre Royal Haymarket; Henry IV – RSC at the Barbican; No Man's Land – Comedy	**Carousel – National Theatre Lyttelton**; Annie Get Your Gun – Prince of Wales; Lady, Be Good – Regent's Park Open Air
Best Comedy	Best Entertainment
**The Rise and Fall of Little Voice by Jim Cartwright – National Theatre Cottesloe / Aldwych**; Lost in Yonkers by Neil Simon – Strand; On the Piste by John Godber – Garrick	**Travels with My Aunt – Wyndham's / Whitehall**; Ennio Marchetto – Whitehall; The Blue Angel – Globe; The Invisible Man – Vaudeville
Best Actor	Best Actress
**Robert Stephens as Sir John Falstaff in Henry IV – RSC at the Barbican**; Kenneth Cranham as Inspector Goole in An Inspector Calls – National Theatre Lyttelton; Paul Eddington as Spooner in No Man's Land – Comedy; Paul Scofield as Captain Shotover in Heartbreak House – Theatre Royal Haymarket	**Alison Steadman as Mari in The Rise and Fall of Little Voice – National Theatre Cottesloe / Aldwych**; Stockard Channing as Ouisa Kittredge in Six Degrees of Separation – Royal Court / Comedy; Judi Dench as Helen Damson in The Gift of the Gorgon – RSC at the Barbican Pit / Wyndham's; Jane Horrocks as Little Voice in The Rise and Fall of Little Voice – National Theatre Cottesloe / Aldwych
Best Actor in a Musical	Best Actress in a Musical
**Henry Goodman as Charles J. Guiteau in Assassins – Donmar Warehouse**; Brent Carver as Luis Alberto Molina in Kiss of the Spider Woman – Shaftesbury; Michael Hayden as Billy Bigelow in Carousel – National Theatre Lyttelton; Kirby Ward as Bobby Child in Crazy for You – Prince Edward	**Joanna Riding as Julie Jordan in Carousel – National Theatre Lyttelton**; Kim Criswell as Annie Oakley in Annie Get Your Gun – Prince of Wales; Ruthie Henshall as Polly Baker in Crazy for You – Prince Edward; Kelly Hunter as Lola Lola in The Blue Angel – Globe
Best Comedy Performance
**Simon Cadell as Henry Pulling in Travels with My Aunt – Wyndham's / Whitehall**; Sara Crowe as Sorel Bliss in Hay Fever – Albery; Guy Henry as Ananias in The Alchemist – RSC at the Barbican; Robert Lindsay as Cyrano de Bergerac in Cyrano de Bergerac – Theatre Royal Haymarket
Best Actor in a Supporting Role	Best Actress in a Supporting Role
**Julian Glover as King Henry IV in Henry IV – RSC at the Barbican**; Robin Bailey as Sir William Gower in Trelawny of the Wells – National Theatre Olivier; David Bradley as Justice Robert Shallow in Henry IV: Part 2 – RSC at the Barbican; Martin Shaw as Lord Arthur Goring in An Ideal Husband – Globe	**Barbara Leigh-Hunt as Sybil Birling in An Inspector Calls – National Theatre Lyttelton**; Annette Badland as Sadie in The Rise and Fall of Little Voice – National Theatre Cottesloe / Aldwych; Elizabeth Bradley as Florence Boothroyd in Billy Liar – National Theatre Cottesloe; Rosemary Harris as Grandma Kurnitz in Lost in Yonkers – Strand
Best Supporting Performance in a Musical
**Janie Dee as Carrie Pipperidge in Carousel – National Theatre Lyttelton**; Ian Bartholomew as Wilf in Radio Times – Queen's; Chris Langham as Bella Zangler in Crazy for You – Prince Edward; Clive Rowe as Enoch Snow in Carousel – National Theatre Lyttelton
Best Director of a Play	Best Director of a Musical
**Stephen Daldry for An Inspector Calls – National Theatre Lyttelton**; Simon McBurney for The Street of Crocodiles – National Theatre Cottesloe; Sam Mendes for The Rise and Fall of Little Voice – National Theatre Cottesloe / Aldwych; Adrian Noble for Henry IV – RSC at the Barbican	**Nicholas Hytner for Carousel – National Theatre Lyttelton**; Sam Mendes for Assassins – Donmar Warehouse; Mike Ockrent for Crazy for You – Prince Edward; Harold Prince for Kiss of the Spider Woman – Shaftesbury
Best Theatre Choreographer
**Susan Stroman for Crazy for You – Prince Edward**; Kenneth MacMillan for Carousel – National Theatre Lyttelton; Marcello Magni for The Street of Crocodiles – National Theatre Cottesloe; Tommy Tune for Grand Hotel – Dominion
Best Set Designer	Best Costume Designer
**Ian MacNeil for An Inspector Calls – National Theatre Lyttelton**; Bob Crowley for Carousel – National Theatre Lyttelton, Henry IV – RSC at the Barbican and No Man's Land – Comedy; Jerome Sirlin for Kiss of the Spider Woman – Shaftesbury; Robin Wagner for Crazy for You – Prince Edward	**William Dudley for Heartbreak House – Theatre Royal Haymarket, Pygmalion – National Theatre Olivier and The Rise and Fall of Little Voice – National Theatre Cottesloe / Aldwych**; Bob Crowley for Carousel – National Theatre Lyttelton and Hamlet – RSC at the Barbican; Anthony Powell for Hay Fever – Albery and Trelawny of the Wells – National Theatre Olivier; Carl Toms for An Ideal Husband – Globe
Best Lighting Designer
**Howell Binkley for Kiss of the Spider Woman – Shaftesbury**; Paule Constable for The Street of Crocodiles – National Theatre Cottesloe; Rick Fisher for An Inspector Calls – National Theatre Lyttelton; Jean Kalman for A Midsummer Night's Dream – National Theatre Olivier
Outstanding Achievement in Dance	Best New Dance Production
**Siobhan Davies for choreographing Winnsboro Cotton Mill Blues, The Royal Ballet – Royal Opera House**; David Bintley for choreographing Tombeaux, Rambert Dance Company – Royalty; Lez Brotherston for set and costume designing the season, Northern Ballet Theatre – Royalty; Joseph Cipolla in The Green Table, Birmingham Royal Ballet – Sadler's Wells	**The Judas Tree, The Royal Ballet – Royal Opera House**; Catalyst, The Australian Ballet – London Coliseum; Donizetti Variations, Les Patineurs and Witchboy, London City Ballet – Sadler's Wells; Winnsboro Cotton Mill Blues, Rambert Dance Company – Royalty
Outstanding Achievement in Opera	Outstanding New Opera Production
**Edward Downes for conducting Stiffelio and The Fiery Angel, The Royal Opera – Royal Opera House**; Bernard Haitink for conducting Die Frau ohne Schatten, The Royal Opera – Royal Opera House; Philip Langridge in Death in Venice, The Royal Opera – Royal Opera House; Júlia Várady in Der fliegende Holländer, The Royal Opera – Royal Opera House	**Stiffelio, The Royal Opera – Royal Opera House**; Death in Venice, The Royal Opera – Royal Opera House; Der fliegende Holländer by The Royal Opera – Royal Opera House; The Fiery Angel, The Royal Opera – Royal Opera House
Award for Outstanding Achievement
Medea, No Man's Land, The Deep Blue Sea and The Rules of the Game for riding the crest of its own wave with great style and giving glamour a good name on the fringe – Almeida; Kenneth Branagh for an ebullient performance (his best on the stage for years) in Hamlet – RSC at the Barbican; Eddie Izzard an accomplished and original comedian, the bloke in a frock, who held audiences spellbound for two-and-a-half-hours in his West End debut – Ambassadors; Robert Lepage for an astonishing solo trip on drugs, jazz and Jean Cocteau with a technologically refined use of film and acrobatics in Needles and Opium – National Theatre Cottesloe; John Osborne for refusing to lie down and completing the circle begun by Look Back in Anger with the energetic update on Jimmy Porter with Déjà Vu – Comedy; Billy Roche for his irresistible tapestry of slowly changing Irish life in the pool hall, the betting shop and the belfry in The Wexford Trilogy – Bush
Society Special Award
**Kenneth MacMillan**

== Productions with multiple nominations and awards ==
The following 25 productions, including one ballet and four operas, received multiple nominations:

- 9: Carousel
- 7: Crazy for You
- 6: An Inspector Calls, Henry IV and The Rise and Fall of Little Voice
- 5: Kiss of the Spider Woman
- 4: The Street of Crocodiles
- 3: Assassins, Heartbreak House and No Man's Land
- 2: An Ideal Husband, Annie Get Your Gun, Death in Venice, Der fliegende Holländer, Grand Hotel, Hay Fever, Lost in Yonkers, Six Degrees of Separation, Stiffelio, The Blue Angel, The Fiery Angel, The Gift of the Gorgon, Travels with My Aunt, Trelawny of the Wells and Winnsboro Cotton Mill Blues

The following six productions received multiple awards:

- 4: An Inspector Calls and Carousel
- 3: The Rise and Fall of Little Voice
- 2: Crazy for You, Henry IV and Travels with My Aunt

== See also ==
- 47th Tony Awards
