= 2011 Laurence Olivier Awards =

Edition of London theatre awards

- Date: 13 March 2011
- Location: Theatre Royal, Drury Lane
- Hosted by: Michael Ball; Imelda Staunton

Television/radio coverage
- Network: BBC Radio 2

The 2011 Olivier Awards were held on 13 March 2011 at the Theatre Royal, Drury Lane, London. The 2011 awards were intended to re-launch the Oliviers as a major awards event, and so they were sponsored by MasterCard, with live coverage by the BBC.

The Theatre show was presented by Michael Ball and Imelda Staunton, with BBC Radio 2 coverage from Paul Gambaccini.

Special guests included Stephen Sondheim, Angela Lansbury, Cameron Mackintosh, Barry Manilow as well as performances by Ramin Karimloo, Alfie Boe, Kerry Ellis, Adrian Lester as well as the London casts of Legally Blonde and Into the Woods to name a few.

The show was accompanied by the BBC Concert Orchestra, conducted by David Charles Abell, and the finale was accompanied by a choir from the CDS (Conference Drama Schools).

== Winners and nominees ==
The nominations were announced on 7 February 2011 in 25 categories.

| Best New Play | Best New Musical |
|---|---|
| Clybourne Park by Bruce Norris – Royal Court; End of the Rainbow by Peter Quilter – Trafalgar Studios; Sucker Punch by Roy Williams – Royal Court; The Little Dog Laughed by Douglas Carter Beane – Garrick; Tribes by Nina Raine – Royal Court | Legally Blonde – Savoy; Fela – National Theatre Olivier; Love Never Dies – Adelphi; Love Story – Duchess |
| Best Revival | Best Musical Revival |
| After the Dance – National Theatre Lyttelton; All My Sons – Apollo; King Lear – Donmar Warehouse; When We Are Married – Garrick | Into the Woods – Regent's Park Open Air; Passion – Donmar Warehouse; Sweet Charity – Theatre Royal Haymarket |
Best Entertainment
The Railway Children – Waterloo Station; Beauty and the Beast – National Theatre Cottesloe; Ghost Stories – Duke of York's; Potted Panto – Vaudeville
| Best Actor | Best Actress |
| Roger Allam as Sir John Falstaff in Henry IV – Shakespeare's Globe; Derek Jacobi as Lear in King Lear – Donmar Warehouse; Rory Kinnear as Prince Hamlet in Hamlet – National Theatre Olivier; Mark Rylance as Valere in La Bête – Comedy; David Suchet as Joe Keller in All My Sons – Apollo | Nancy Carroll as Joan in After the Dance – National Theatre Lyttelton; Tracie Bennett as Judy Garland in End of the Rainbow – Trafalgar Studios; Tamsin Greig as Diane in The Little Dog Laughed – Garrick; Sophie Thompson as Bev/Kathy in Clybourne Park – Royal Court |
| Best Actor in a Musical | Best Actress in a Musical |
| David Thaxton as Giorgio in Passion – Donmar Warehouse; Alex Gaumond as Emmett Forrest in Legally Blonde – Savoy; Ramin Karimloo as Erik the Phantom in Love Never Dies – Adelphi; Sahr Ngaujah as Fela Kuti in Fela – National Theatre Olivier; Michael Xavier as Oliver Barratt IV in Love Story – Duchess | Sheridan Smith as Elle Woods in Legally Blonde – Savoy; Sierra Boggess as Christine Daaé in Love Never Dies – Adelphi; Elena Roger as Fosca in Passion – Donmar Warehouse; Emma Williams as Jenny in Love Story – Duchess |
| Best Actor in a Supporting Role | Best Actress in a Supporting Role |
| Adrian Scarborough as John Reid in After the Dance – National Theatre Lyttelton; James Laurenson as King Hamlet's Ghost and The Player King in Hamlet – National Theatre Olivier; Hilton McRae as Anthony in End of the Rainbow – Trafalgar Studios; Lee Ross as Jack Firebrace in Birdsong – Comedy | Michelle Terry as Sylvia in Tribes – Royal Court; Sarah Goldberg as Betsy and Lindsey in Clybourne Park – Royal Court; Anastasia Hille as Aline Solness in The Master Builder – Almeida; Gina McKee as Goneril in King Lear – Donmar Warehouse; Rachael Stirling as Lady Chiltern in An Ideal Husband – Vaudeville |
Best Supporting Role in a Musical
Jill Halfpenny as Paulette Bonafonté in Legally Blonde – Savoy; Josefina Gabrielle as Nickie in Sweet Charity – Theatre Royal Haymarket; Summer Strallen as Meg Giry in Love Never Dies – Adelphi; Michael Xavier as Cinderella's Prince and The Wolf in Into the Woods – Regent's Park Open Air
| Best Director | Best Theatre Choreographer |
| Howard Davies for The White Guard – National Theatre Lyttelton; Dominic Cooke for Clybourne Park – Royal Court; Michael Grandage for King Lear – Donmar Warehouse; Thea Sharrock for After the Dance – National Theatre Lyttelton | Leon Baugh for Sucker Punch – Royal Court; Bill T. Jones for Fela – National Theatre Olivier; Stephen Mear for Sweet Charity – Theatre Royal Haymarket; Jerry Mitchell for Legally Blonde – Savoy |
| Best Set Design | Best Costume Design |
| Bunny Christie for The White Guard – National Theatre Lyttelton; Lez Brotherston for Design for Living – Old Vic; Miriam Buether for Earthquakes in London – National Theatre Cottesloe; Bob Crowley for Love Never Dies – Adelphi | Hildegard Bechtler for After the Dance – National Theatre Lyttelton; Lez Brotherston for Design for Living – Old Vic; Bob Crowley for Love Never Dies – Adelphi; Mark Thompson for London Assurance – National Theatre Olivier |
| Best Lighting Design | Best Sound Design |
| Neil Austin for The White Guard, National Theatre Lyttelton; Paul Constable for Love Never Dies – Adelphi; Mark Henderson for After the Dance – National Theatre Lyttelton; Hugh Vanstone for Deathtrap – Noël Coward | Adam Cork for King Lear – Donmar Warehouse; Nick Manning for Ghost Stories – Duke of York's; Gareth Owen for End of the Rainbow – Trafalgar Studios; Craig Vear for The Railway Children – Waterloo Station |
| Outstanding Achievement in Dance | Best New Dance Production |
| Antony Gormley for set designing Babel (Words) – Sadler's Wells; John MacFarlane for set designing Asphodel Meadows – Royal Opera House; Yoshie Sunahata for drumming in Gnosis, Kodo – Sadler's Wells | Babel (Words) – Sadler's Wells; Cinderella, New Adventures – Sadler's Wells; Mambo 3XX1, Danza Contemporanea de Cuba – Sadler's Wells |
| Outstanding Achievement in Opera | Best New Opera Production |
| Christian Gerhaher in Tannhäuser, The Royal Opera – Royal Opera House; Jonas Kaufmann in Adriana Lecouvreur – Royal Opera House; Andrew Shore in The Elixir of Love, English National Opera – London Coliseum | La bohème – OperaUpClose (at Soho Theatre); A Dog's Heart – London Coliseum; Adriana Lecouvreur – Royal Opera House; Elegy for Young Lovers – Young Vic |
Outstanding Achievement in Affiliate Theatre
Blasted – Lyric Hammersmith; Ivan and the Dogs – Soho / ATC; Les Parents terribles – Trafalgar Studios 2 / Donmar Warehouse; The Empire – Royal Court / Drum Theatre Plymouth
Audience Award
We Will Rock You; Billy Elliot; Jersey Boys; Les Misérables
Society Special Award
Stephen Sondheim

== Productions with multiple nominations and awards ==
The following 21 productions, including one ballet and one opera, received multiple nominations:

- 7: Love Never Dies
- 6: After the Dance
- 5: King Lear, Legally Blonde
- 4: Clybourne Park, End of the Rainbow
- 3: Fela, Love Story, Passion, Sweet Charity, The White Guard
- 2: Adriana Lecouvreur, All My Sons, Babel (Words), Ghost Stories, Hamlet, Into the Woods, Sucker Punch, The Little Dog Laughed, The Railway Children, Tribes

The following four productions, including one ballet, received multiple awards:

- 4: After the Dance
- 3: Legally Blonde, The White Guard
- 2: Babel (Words)

== See also ==
- 65th Tony Awards
