= 2004 Laurence Olivier Awards =

Edition of London theatre awards

The 2004 Laurence Olivier Awards were held in 2004 in London celebrating excellence in West End theatre by the Society of London Theatre.

== Winners and nominees ==
Details of winners (in bold) and nominees, in each award category, per the Society of London Theatre.

Best New Play	Best New Musical
**The Pillowman by Martin McDonagh – National Theatre Cottesloe**; Democracy by Michael Frayn – National Theatre Cottesloe; Elmina's Kitchen by Kwame Kwei-Armah – National Theatre Cottesloe; Hitchcock Blonde by Terry Johnson – Royal Court / Lyric	**Jerry Springer – Cambridge**; Ragtime – Piccadilly; Thoroughly Modern Millie – Shaftesbury
Best Revival	Outstanding Musical Production
**Mourning Becomes Electra – National Theatre Lyttelton**; Absolutely! (Perhaps) – Wyndham's; Caligula – Donmar Warehouse; Of Mice and Men – Savoy	**Pacific Overtures – Donmar Warehouse**; High Society – Regent's Park Open Air; Joseph and the Amazing Technicolor Dreamcoat – New London; Tell Me on a Sunday – Gielgud
Best Entertainment
**Duckie's C'est Barbican – Garrick**; My Brilliant Divorce – Apollo; One Last Flutter – Comedy; The Rat Pack: Live from Las Vegas – Strand
Best Actor	Best Actress
**Matthew Kelly as Lennie Small in Of Mice and Men – Savoy**; Roger Allam as Willy Brandt in Democracy – National Theatre Cottesloe; Kenneth Branagh as Edmond Burke in Edmond – National Theatre Olivier; Greg Hicks as Coriolanus in Coriolanus – Old Vic; Michael Sheen as Caligula in Caligula – Donmar Warehouse	**Eileen Atkins as Honor in Honour – National Theatre Cottesloe**; Helen Mirren as Christine Mannon in Mourning Becomes Electra – National Theatre Lyttelton; Ann Mitchell as Martha in Through the Leaves – Duchess; Kelly Reilly as Miss Julie in After Miss Julie – Donmar Warehouse; Kristin Scott Thomas as Masha Sergeyevna Kulygina in Three Sisters – Playhouse
Best Actor in a Musical	Best Actress in a Musical
**David Bedella as Jonathan Weiruss/Satan in Jerry Springer – Cambridge**; Graham Bickley as Tateh in Ragtime – Piccadilly; Michael Brandon as Jerry Springer in Jerry Springer – Cambridge; Kevyn Morrow as Coalhouse Walker Jr. in Ragtime – Piccadilly	**Maria Friedman as Mother in Ragtime – Piccadilly**; Amanda Holden as Millie Dilmount in Thoroughly Modern Millie – Shaftesbury; Alison Jiear as Shawntel/Eve in Jerry Springer – Cambridge; Maureen Lipman as Mrs. Meers in Thoroughly Modern Millie – Shaftesbury
Best Performance in a Supporting Role	Best Performance in a Supporting Role in a Musical
**Warren Mitchell as Gregory Solomon in The Price – Apollo**; Joe Dixon as Paris in The Roman Actor – Gielgud; Oliver Ford Davies as Lamberto Laudisi in Absolutely! (Perhaps) – Wyndham's; Paul Hilton as Orin Mannon in Mourning Becomes Electra – National Theatre Lyttelton	**The Chorus as The Studio Audience of Jerry Springer – Cambridge**; Tracie Bennett as Liz Imbrie in High Society – Regent's Park Open Air; Richard Henders as Manjiro in Pacific Overtures – Donmar Warehouse; Jérôme Pradon as the Shogun's Mother and the French Admiral in Pacific Overtures – Donmar Warehouse; Matthew White as Younger Brother in Ragtime – Piccadilly
Best Director	Best Theatre Choreographer
**Michael Grandage for Caligula – Donmar Warehouse**; Stafford Arima for Ragtime – Piccadilly; Gary Griffin for Pacific Overtures – Donmar Warehouse; Stewart Lee for Jerry Springer – Cambridge	**Karen Bruce for Pacific Overtures – Donmar Warehouse**; Jenny Arnold for Jerry Springer – Cambridge; Rob Ashford for Thoroughly Modern Millie – Shaftesbury
Best Set Design	Best Costume Design
**William Dudley for Hitchcock Blonde – Royal Court / Lyric**; Bob Crowley for Mourning Becomes Electra – National Theatre Lyttelton; Franco Zeffirelli for Absolutely! (Perhaps) – Wyndham's	**Christopher Oram for Power – National Theatre Cottesloe**; Mara Blumenfeld for Pacific Overtures – Donmar Warehouse; Raimonda Gaetaniat for Absolutely! (Perhaps) – Wyndham's; Martin Pakledinaz for Thoroughly Modern Millie – Shaftesbury
Best Lighting Design	Best Sound Design
**Hugh Vanstone for Pacific Overtures – Donmar Warehouse**; Simon Corder for Hitchcock Blonde – Royal Court / Lyric; Howard Harrison for Ragtime – Piccadilly	**Mike Walker for Jerry Springer – Cambridge**; Paul Arditti for The Pillowman – National Theatre Cottesloe; Peter Hylenski for Ragtime – Piccadilly; Nick Lidster for Pacific Overtures – Donmar Warehouse
Outstanding Achievement in Dance	Best New Dance Production
**Thomas Edur and Agne Oaks in 2 Human, English National Ballet – Sadler's Wells**; Carlos Acosta in Tocororo: A Cuban Tale – Sadler's Wells; Javier de Frutos for choreographing Elsa Canasta, Rambert Dance Company – Sadler's Wells; Rambert Dance Company for the season – Sadler's Wells	**Broken Fall, George Piper Dances – Royal Opera House**; Dream Play, Nederlands Dans Theater 2 – Sadler's Wells; Mesmerics, George Piper Dances – Sadler's Wells; Promethean Fire, Paul Taylor Dance Company – Sadler's Wells
Outstanding Achievement in Opera	Outstanding New Opera Production
**Cristina Gallardo-Domâs in Madama Butterfly, The Royal Opera – Royal Opera House**; Simon Keenlyside in Hamlet and Die Zauberflöte, The Royal Opera – Royal Opera House; Bejun Mehta in Orlando, The Royal Opera – Royal Opera House; Felicity Palmer in Elektra and Sweeney Todd, The Royal Opera – Royal Opera House	**The Trojans: Parts I and II, English National Opera – London Coliseum**; Così fan tutte, English National Opera – Barbican; Madama Butterfly, The Royal Opera – Royal Opera House; Orlando, The Royal Opera – Royal Opera House
Most Promising Newcomer in an Affiliate Theatre	Outstanding Achievement in an Affiliate Theatre
**Debbie Tucker Green for writing Born Bad – Hampstead**; Tom Hardy as Skank in In Arabia We'd All Be Kings – Hampstead; Ruth Negga as Cat in Duck – Royal Court; Lucy Prebble for writing The Sugar Syndrome – Royal Court	**Young Vic for the season under the artistic direction of David Lan**; Tanika Gupta for writing Fragile Land – Hampstead and Hobson's Choice – Young Vic; Pericles – Lyric Hammersmith; The Lady from the Sea – Almeida
Society Special Award
**Judi Dench**

== Productions with multiple nominations and awards ==
The following 14 productions, including one opera, received multiple nominations:

- 8: Jerry Springer, Pacific Overtures and Ragtime
- 5: Thoroughly Modern Millie
- 4: Absolutely! (Perhaps) and Mourning Becomes Electra
- 3: Caligula and Hitchcock Blonde
- 2: Democracy, High Society, Madama Butterfly, Of Mice and Men, Orlando and The Pillowman

The following two productions received multiple awards:

- 4: Jerry Springer
- 3: Pacific Overtures

== See also ==
- 58th Tony Awards
