= Ultz =

British theatre director (active 2007– )

ULTZ is a British theatre director, set designer and costume designer, best known for his work on the London stage. He won the 2010 Olivier Award for Best Set Design for the production of Jerusalem at the Royal Court Theatre. His production of "Pied Piper - a hip hop dance revolution" won the Theatre Royal Stratford East the 2007 Laurence Olivier Award for Outstanding Achievement in an Affiliate Theatre. ULTZ did the set design for the Royal National Theatre's Ma Rainey's Black Bottom, for which the National won the 2016 Laurence Olivier Award for Best Revival.

He has also worked on Broadway, and was nominated for the 2011 Tony Award for Best Scenic Design in a Play for the production of Jerusalem at the Music Box Theatre.

ULTZ is a stage name, which the designer claims he received in a dream.
