= Todd Rosenthal =

American scenic designer

== Biography ==
Todd Rosenthal is an American scenic designer. He won the 2008 Tony Award for Best Scenic Design and the 2009 Laurence Olivier Award for Best Set Design for Steppenwolf Theatre Company's August: Osage County.

A native of Longmeadow, Massachusetts, Rosenthal received a Bachelor of Arts degree from Colgate University and a Master of Fine Arts from the Yale School of Drama, where he received the Donald M. Oenslager Scholarship for Stage Design. He also studied at the Art Students League of New York and Moore College of Art.

== Broadway Debut ==
Rosenthal made his Broadway debut with August: Osage County. He considered the three-level set, which he called a juxtaposition of the "gothic and the whimsical," to be a central character in the play. Of it he said, "It's immovable, an indelible image ... people move out, but the house never changes."

== Regional Theatre Credits ==
Rosenthal's regional theatre credits include productions for the Goodman Theatre, Steppenwolf Theatre Company, Centerstage in Baltimore, Alley Theatre in Houston, the Philadelphia Theatre Company, San Jose Repertory Theatre, Alliance Theatre in Atlanta, Yale Repertory Theatre, Lyric Opera of Chicago, Arena Stage in Washington, D.C., the Paper Mill Playhouse in Millburn, New Jersey, Notre Dame Shakespeare Festival, and the Big Apple Circus.

== Commercial Credits ==
Rosenthal's commercial projects include micro-brewery-themed restaurants for Anheuser Busch; a pirate-themed restaurant at the Treasure Island Hotel and Casino on the Las Vegas Strip; and a mining-themed tavern and restaurant for the Copper Mountain Resort in Colorado.

== Academic Career ==
Rosenthal was an adjunct professor of design at DePaul University from 1995 until 2003. He has been a professor in the Department of Theatre at Northwestern University since Autumn 2003.

== Reviews ==
From a review of the production of Arthur Miller's Death of a Salesman at the Milwaukee Repertory Theater, Rosenthal's work was described to be effective. With a limited view of how the days and times change throughout the show.

For a production of Eugene O'Neill's Ah, Wilderness! during Chicago's Goodman Theatre, Rosenthal was able to bring a sense of atmosphere and nostalgia to the audience through his set design.

In the 2011 debut of Regina Taylor's The Trinity River Plays at Chicago's Goodman Theatre, Rosenthal is described as designing the set in meticulous detail with the production having a "realist aesthetic".

== Awards and nominations ==
Year	Award	Category	Work	Result	Ref.
2008	Tony Awards	Best Scenic Design of a Play	August: Osage County	Won	
2009	Laurence Olivier Award	Best Set Design	August: Osage County	Won	
2011	Tony Awards	Best Scenic Design of a Play	The Motherf**ker with the Hat	Nominated	
2011	Outer Critics Circle	Outstanding Set Design	The Motherf**ker with the Hat	Nominated	
