= Laurence Olivier Award for Best New Opera Production =

Annual award for London theatre

- Awarded for: Best New Opera Production
- Location: England
- Presented by: Society of London Theatre
- First award: 1993
- Currently held by: Dead Man Walking by English National Opera (2026)
- Website: officiallondontheatre.com/olivier-awards/

The Laurence Olivier Award for Best New Opera Production is an annual award presented by the Society of London Theatre in recognition of the "world-class status of London theatre." The awards were established as the Society of West End Theatre Awards in 1976, and renamed in 1984 in honour of English actor and director Laurence Olivier.

This award was first presented in 1993, becoming only the second Olivier Award focused solely on opera, along with the award for Outstanding Achievement in Opera (introduced in 1977).

== Winners and nominees ==
=== 1990s ===
Year	Production	Company
1993
1993	Stiffelio	The Royal Opera
1993	Death in Venice	The Royal Opera
1993	Der Fliegende Hollander	The Royal Opera
1993	The Fiery Angel	The Royal Opera
1994
1994	La damnation de Faust	The Royal Opera
1994	Ariodante	English National Opera
1994	Gloriana	Opera North
1994	Die Meistersinger von Nurnberg	The Royal Opera
1995
1995	Khovanshchina	English National Opera
1995	Così fan tutte	The Royal Opera
1995	Don Quixote	English National Opera
1995	Roméo et Juliette	The Royal Opera
1996
1996	Billy Budd	The Royal Opera
1996	A Midsummer Night's Dream	English National Opera
1996	Salome	The Royal Opera
1996	Siegfried	The Royal Opera
1997
1997	Tristan und Isolde	English National Opera
1997	Cavalleria Rusticana and Pagliacci	Welsh National Opera
1997	Fidelio	English National Opera
1998
1998	Paul Bunyan	The Royal Opera
1998	Falstaff	English National Opera and Opera North
1998	Palestrina	The Royal Opera
1998	Platée	The Royal Opera
1999
1999	La clemenza di Tito	Welsh National Opera
1999	Boris Godunov	English National Opera
1999	L'Orfeo	Théâtre Royal de la Monnaie
1999	Il trittico	English National Opera

=== 2000s ===
Year	Production	Company
2000
2000	Hansel and Gretel	Welsh National Opera
2000	Alcina	English National Opera
2000	Parsifal	English National Opera
2000	Semele	English National Opera
2001
2001	The Greek Passion	The Royal Opera
2001	Pelléas and Mélisande	English National Opera
2001	L'incoronazione di Poppea	English National Opera
2001	War and Peace	The Kirov Opera
2002
2002	Boulevard Solitude	The Royal Opera
2002	Jenůfa	The Royal Opera
2002	The Rape of Lucretia	English National Opera
2002	Rigoletto	The Royal Opera
2003
2003	Wozzeck	The Royal Opera
2003	Ariadne auf Naxos	The Royal Opera
2003	Bluebeard's Castle and Erwartung	The Royal Opera
2003	Lulu	English National Opera
2004
2004	Les Troyens (Parts I and II)	English National Opera
2004	Così fan tutte	English National Opera
2004	Madama Butterfly	The Royal Opera
2004	Orlando	The Royal Opera
2005
2005	Lady Macbeth of the Mtsensk District	The Royal Opera
2005	Les Paladins	Les Arts Florissants
2005	Peter Grimes	The Royal Opera
2006
2006	Madama Butterfly	English National Opera
2006	Billy Budd	English National Opera
2006	La clemenza di Tito	English National Opera
2006	On the Town	English National Opera
2007
2007	Jenůfa	English National Opera
2007	The Makropulos Affair	English National Opera
2007	Orfeo	English National Opera
2007	Peter Grimes	Opera North
2008
2008	Pelléas et Mélisande	The Royal Opera
2008	Agrippina	English National Opera
2008	La fille du régiment	The Royal Opera
2008	The Turn of the Screw	English National Opera
2009
2009	Partenope	English National Opera
2009	Don Carlos	The Royal Opera
2009	The Minotaur	The Royal Opera
2009	I Pagliacci	English National Opera

=== 2010s ===
Year	Production	Company
2010
2010	Tristan und Isolde	The Royal Opera
2010	Der Fliegende Holländer	The Royal Opera
2010	Lulu	The Royal Opera
2010	Peter Grimes	English National Opera
2011
2011	Bohème	OperaUpClose (at Soho Theatre)
2011	A Dog's Heart	English National Opera
2011	Adriana Lecouvreur	The Royal Opera
2011	Elegy for Young Lovers	English National Opera
2012
2012	Castor et Pollux	English National Opera
2012	Clemency	ROH2
2012	A Midsummer Night's Dream	English National Opera
2012	The Passenger	English National Opera
2013
2013	Einstein on the Beach	Robert Wilson and Philip Glass
2013	Billy Budd	English National Opera
2013	Caligula	English National Opera
2013	La traviata	English National Opera
2014
2014	Les vêpres siciliennes	The Royal Opera
2014	The Firework-Maker's Daughter	The Royal Opera
2014	Wozzeck	English National Opera
2015
2015	The Mastersingers of Nuremberg	English National Opera
2015	Benvenuto Cellini	English National Opera
2015	Dialogues des Carmélites	The Royal Opera
2015	Die Frau ohne Schatten	The Royal Opera
2016
2016	Cavalleria rusticana / Pagliacci	The Royal Opera
2016	Morgen und Abend	The Royal Opera
2016	The Force of Destiny	English National Opera
2017
2017	Akhnaten	English National Opera
2017	4.48 Psychosis	The Royal Opera
2017	Così Fan Tutte	The Royal Opera
2017	Lulu	English National Opera
2018
2018	Semiramide	The Royal Opera
2018	La bohème	King's Head Theatre
2018	The Exterminating Angel	The Royal Opera
2019
2019	Katya Kabanova	Royal Opera House (Note: The official Olivier Award website only credits the venue as the 2019 nominee, with no mention of the theatre company that performed, so can not assume that The Royal Opera (operating in Royal Opera House) nor the English National Opera (operating in, and co-producing with, Regent's Park Open Air Theatre) were nominated.)
2019	Lessons in Love and Violence	Royal Opera House
2019	The Turn of the Screw	Regent's Park Open Air Theatre

=== 2020s ===
Year	Production	Company
2020
2020	Billy Budd	Royal Opera House (Note: The official Olivier Award website only credits the venue as the 2020 nominee, with no mention of the company that performed, so can not assume that The Royal Opera company was nominated.)
2020	Berenice	Royal Opera House
2020	Hansel and Gretel	Regent's Park Open Air Theatre and English National Opera
2020	Noye's Fludde	Theatre Royal Stratford East and English National Opera
2021	Not presented due to extended closing of theatre productions during COVID-19 pandemic (Note: Due to late March 2020 to late July 2021 closing of London theatre productions during the COVID-19 pandemic in England, the 2022 awards recognise productions that launched anytime from February 2020 to February 2022)	
2022
2022	Jenůfa	The Royal Opera
2022	Bajazet	Irish National Opera and The Royal Opera
2022	The Cunning Little Vixen	English National Opera
2022	Theodora	The Royal Opera
2023
2023	Alcina	The Royal Opera
2023	Least Like the Other	Irish National Opera & The Royal Opera
2023	Peter Grimes	The Royal Opera
2023	Sibyl	William Kentridge
2024
2024	Innocence	The Royal Opera
2024	Blue	English National Opera
2024	Picture A Day Like This	The Royal Opera
2024	The Rhinegold	English National Opera
2025
2025	Festen	The Royal Opera
2025	Duke Bluebeard's Castle	English National Opera
2025	L'Olimpiade	Irish National Opera, The Royal Opera & Nouvel Opéra Fribourg
2025	The Tales of Hoffmann	The Royal Opera
