= Made in Dagenham (musical) =

2014 British musical

- The Musical Concert
- Music: David Arnold
- Lyrics: Richard Thomas
- Book: Richard Bean
- Setting: Dagenham in 1968
- Basis: Made in Dagenham by William Ivory
- Premiere: 5 November 2014: Adelphi Theatre
- Productions: 2014 West End

Made in Dagenham is a musical with music by David Arnold, lyrics by Richard Thomas, and a book by Richard Bean. Based on the 2010 film of the same name, which in turn was based on the real events of the Ford sewing machinists strike of 1968, the musical made its West End and world premiere at the Adelphi Theatre in 2014.

The 2010 film received several award nominations, and the following year, it was announced that a musical was under development. Gemma Arterton was cast in the role of Rita, a working woman and mother who becomes a union leader amidst the strike, despite the wishes of her husband and children, who feel neglected by her focus on labour issues.

Made in Dagenham opened for previews on 5 October 2014 at the Adelphi Theatre. It opened on 9 November to mixed but generally positive reviews. Despite the good reception, it closed on 11 April 2015, due to poor ticket sales.

== Synopsis ==
=== Act One ===
The show sets the scene of the O’Grady household. The house relies on Rita O’Grady, a busy working mother, looking after everything whilst her husband, Eddie barely struggles to remember their anniversary (“Busy Woman”). Their son Graham is being caned at school and their daughter, Sharon, wants to be a doctor though Rita quickly points out women are only nurses. Eddie and Rita work at Ford's Dagenham River Plant, a large bustling industrial site home to 5,000 men and 200 women (“Made in Dagenham”). The men build the cars, whilst the women work as seamstresses on the upholstery for the seats. The women discover that they're to be re-graded as unskilled workers, reducing their pay, and raise their objections to their union leaders Connie and Monty (“This is what we want”). Monty is discussing their objections in the union office at the plant when Jeremy Hopkins, the factory manager enters. He pressures Monty to confuse the girls by asking them to register a formal grievance. The girls agree to register a grievance - selecting Rita to represent them (“Wossname”).

Meanwhile, in Westminster, the Prime Minister Harold Wilson is being briefed on the depressing state of the economy and the high rates of industrial unrest (“Always A Problem”). To tackle the problem he selects Barbara Castle, Minister for Transport, to become Secretary of State for Talking to the Unions.

Back in Dagenham it's Friday night in the social club (“Payday”) and tensions are running high as the men confront the girls about not accepting a re-grading. After a confrontation Rita storms out of the pub, as the girls remind Eddie he's forgotten it's their 10th wedding anniversary - sending him running after her (“I'm Sorry I Love You”).

Rita goes into school to confront Mr Buckton about his caning of her son Graham. After a patronising interaction with Mr Buckton she bumps into Lisa Hopkins in the corridor and the two bond over their hatred of Mr Buckton's caning, with Lisa Hopkins suggesting they start a petition. Lisa Hopkins is married to Jeremy Hopkins, the manager of the plant.

As Rita starts to get more involved with union politics, Connie shares her experiences (“Same Old Story”) and urges Rita to go beyond objecting to re-grading and instead asking for equal pay between genders. At a meeting between union leaders and plant management, Rita asks for equal pay - a request that's laughed at. She returns to the plant and the girls vote unanimously for a strike, and Rita finds Eddie, Sharon and Graham as the kids tell her that Eddie made them chips on toast (“Everybody Out”).

=== Act Two ===
Ford America parachutes in their brash and arrogant executive Mr Tooley to resolve the strike (“This is America”). He tells Hopkins to stop the production line and lay all the men off in an attempt to pressure the girls into going back to work (“Storm Clouds”). Lisa tips Rita off that they've offered one of the girls, Sandra, marketing work to try and crack the solidarity of the strike. Rita visits Connie who's been hospitalised with breast cancer. Connie encourages Rita to give the speech she was going to give to the Trade Union Congress. Rita gatecrashes the launch of the Ford Mark II Cortina 1600E to confront Sandra (“Cortina”) where she bumps into Barbara, Minister for Transport, who invites her to a meeting in Westminster. When she gets home she's greeted by a letter from Eddie, who's taken the kids away because of the pressure the strike has put on their relationship (“The Letter”). Lisa arrives to encourage Rita, and offers to lend her a Biba dress for the TUC speech.

The girls meet Barbara in Westminster (“Ideal World”) who passes on Ford's offer of 92% of the male rate, an offer Rita refuses.

Back at the hospital, Connie has died leaving Rita a copy of the speech for the TUC conference. Eddie confronts Rita about the state of their marriage (“We Nearly Had It All”), eventually coming round to supporting Rita's strike despite pressure from his male colleagues to ‘sort her out’.

The action turns to the TUC Conference (“Viva Eastbourne”) where Lisa gives Rita some final words of encouragement before she gives her big speech. Mr Tooley throws a spanner in the works by tearing up the speech and confronting Rita backstage where he tells her that she's just a little girl before stalking off. Rita's friends arrive and give her the confidence to get out onstage and not let Connie down. Rita makes a passionate and heartfelt speech to the conference (“Stand Up”) which successfully persuades the TUC to make equal pay a core policy.

== Background ==
The musical is based on the 2010 film Made in Dagenham, which in turn centred around the true-life events of the Ford sewing machinists strike of 1968. The film principally follows the main character of Rita O'Grady, who acts as the spokesperson for a group of female workers at Ford's Dagenham plant, who go on strike to fight the inequality that becomes apparent when women workers were to be paid less as they were classed as unskilled. In contrast, their male colleagues were classed as skilled and ultimately received more pay. These actions led to the creation of the Equal Pay Act 1970. It received four British Academy of Film and Television Arts (BAFTA) nominations, including Outstanding British film.

In December 2011, it was first revealed that a musical adaption of the film Made in Dagenham was being worked on. A reading of the book from the show took place the same month with two workshops also being held the following year. During these workshops, actress Gemma Arterton played the lead role of Rita, and in August 2013, Producers Stage Entertainment revealed that they would like Arterton to play the role subject to scheduling and were seeking an autumn 2014 opening.

On 3 March 2014, the show was officially confirmed and it was announced that the show would premiere in London in autumn 2014. The musical has a book by Richard Bean and is directed by Rupert Goold, with choreography by Aletta Collins, set and costume design by Bunny Christie and lighting by Jon Clark. The musical's score is composed by David Arnold, with lyrics by Richard Thomas and sound design by Richard Brooker.

== Production history ==
The show's premiere production began previews at the Adelphi Theatre in London, on 9 October 2014, with its official opening night coming on 5 November. Rehearsals for the production began on 4 August, with their first public outing coming on 28 September, with an appearance on Sunday Night at the London Palladium and in November the cast performed "Everybody Out" on the BBC's Children in Need. The lead role of Rita is played by Arterton, with husband Eddie being played by Adrian Der Gregorian. A typical London performance runs two hours and 45 minutes, including one interval of 15 mins. The production closed on 11 April 2015, despite positive reviews due to poor ticket sales. Made In Dagenham was replaced by Kinky Boots at the Adelphi Theatre in London on 15 September 2015, with previews from 21 August.

A new actor/musician co-production by the Queen's Theatre, Hornchurch and New Wolsey Theatre, Ipswich was created and performed in autumn 2016 at the Queen's Theatre Hornchurch, and the New Wolsey Theatre Ipswich. It was directed by the Queen's Theatre Hornchurch artistic director, Douglas Rintoul, designed by Hayley Grindle with musical direction by Ben Goddard, choreography by Tim Jackson, lighting design by Paul Anderson and sound design by Emma Laxton. It received favourable reviews. The cast included Daniella Bowen, Angela Bain, Daniel Carter-Hope, Dan de Cruz, Sophie-May Feek, Jeffrey Harmer, Callum Harrower, Joey Hickman, Anthony Hunt, Martina Isibor, Graham Kent, Claire Machin, Wendy Morgan, Jamie Noar, Loren O'Dair, Elizabeth Rowe, Sioned Saunders, Sarah Scowen, Steve Simmonds, Thomas Sutcliffe and Alex Tomkins.

A 10th anniversary concert production, led by Pixie Lott as O'Grady and Bonnie Langford as Castle, played at the London Palladium on 16 March 2024. The cast also included Killian Donnelly as Eddie O'Grady, Trevor Dion Nicholas as Mr Tooley, and Peter Duncan as Monty. The 10th anniversary concert was produced by Sisco Entertainmenr with Shaun Kerrison directing and Michael Bradley as musical director.

== Musical Numbers ==
Act I

- "Busy Woman" - Rita, Sharon, Graham, Eddie & Ensemble
- "Made in Dagenham" - Ensemble
- "This Is What We Want" - Sandra, Beryl, Rita, Cass, Clare & Female Ensemble
- "Union Song" - Male Ensemble
- "Wossname" - Clare, Female Ensemble
- "Always A Problem" - Harold Wilson & Aides
- "Payday!" - Ensemble
- "I'm Sorry, I Love You" - Eddie, Rita & Male Ensemble
- "School Song" - Graham & Male Ensemble
- "Connie's Song" - Connie
- "Union Song Reprise" - Ensemble
- "Everybody Out" - Rita & Factory Workers

Act II

- "This is America" - Mr. Tooley & Ensemble
- "Storm Clouds Montage" - Lisa, Mr. Tooley, Harold Wilson, Barbara Castle & Ensemble
- "Cortina" - Cortina Man & Girls
- "The Letter" - Eddie
- "In An Ideal World" - Barbara Castle
- "We Nearly Had it All" - Rita, Eddie & Female Ensemble
- "Viva Eastbourne" - Beryl, Sandra, Cass & Ensemble
- "Stand Up" - Rita, Eddie & Ensemble
- "Finale" - Company

=== Orchestra ===
The musical uses a nine-member orchestra consisting of keyboard, piano, guitar, bass, drums, percussion, reeds and trumpet.

=== Recordings ===
On 13 June 2014, the first song from the musical was revealed as Everybody Out and was released on SoundCloud, with two other tracks, "The Letter" and the musical's title song "Made in Dagenham" also released on SoundCloud and via the show's website. In addition Everybody Out was released as a single on 28 July 2014. Shortly prior to the show's West End closure it was announced a cast recording would be released. Recorded live at London's Adelphi Theatre the cast recording was released on digital formats only on 18 May 2015, via First Night Records.

Made in Dagenham

Cast recording by the Original London cast
- Released: 18 May 2015
- Genre: Broadway musical
- Length: 1:11:02
- Label: First Night Records
- Producer: Rupert Goold

No.	Title	Length
1.	"Busy Woman"	5.19
2.	"Made in Dagenham"	3.20
3.	"This Is What We Want"	3.00
4.	"Wossname"	2.16
5.	"Always A Problem"	3.00
6.	"Payday"	2.20
7.	"I'm Sorry, I Love You"	3.49
8.	"Connie's Song"	3.39
9.	"Everybody Out"	7.39
10.	"This Is America"	4.59
11.	"Storm Clouds"	7.31
12.	"Cortina"	2.55
13.	"The Letter"	4.03
14.	"Ideal World"	3.58
15.	"We Nearly Had It All"	3.49
16.	"Viva Eastbourne"	1.59
17.	"Stand Up"	7.26

== Principal roles and original cast ==
Female ensemble cast of Made in Dagenham

Character	Original West End Performer	2024 10th Anniversary Cast
Rita O'Grady	Gemma Arterton	Pixie Lott
Eddie O'Grady	Adrian Der Gregorian	Killian Donnelly
Mr Tooley	Steve Furst	Trevor Dion Nicholas
Barbara Castle	Sophie-Louise Dann	Bonnie Langford
Prime Minister Harold Wilson	Mark Hadfield	Gerard Carey
Connie	Isla Blair	Katy Secombe
Mr Hopkins	Julius D'Silva	Richard Dempsey
Lisa Hopkins	Naomi Frederick	Zoe Rainey
Monty	David Cardy	Peter Duncan
Beryl	Sophie Stanton	Jenna Boyd
Clare	Heather Craney	Kerry Winter
Sandra	Sophie Isaacs	Geradine Scadalan
Cass	Naana Agyei-Ampadu	Sarah Merrifield
Buddy Cortina	Scott Garnham	Oscar Conlon-Morrey
Sharon O'Grady	Grace Doherty; Gemma Fray; Annie Guy; Ivy Pratt	
Graham O'Grady	Harry Marcus; Ben Mineard; Tommy Rodger; Josh Shadbolt	

== Critical reception ==
The musical received mixed but generally positive reviews. Henry Hitchings, for the Evening Standard, regarded it as "robustly likeable — mixing passionate populism with bursts of big-budget flamboyance". Paul Taylor, for The Independent, called it "a West End musical you can be pleased to acknowledge was 'made in Britain' ".

Nevertheless, even some of those who praised the musical criticised some aspects of the production, with Hitchings calling it "occasionally crass and a little too manipulative (the final number ["Stand Up"] is an especially brazen bid to get us on our feet)". Taylor suggested Made in Dagenham was "uneven but captivating".

Others were more critical. Simon Edge, for the Daily Express, complained of an "underpowered central performance from Gemma Arterton as Rita ... she lacks any of the goofy charisma that Sally Hawkins brought to the film role, so that it's hard to see how her character ever came to the fore of this dispute". Michael Billington, in his review for The Guardian, opined that Arnold's score "rarely rises above the functional".

== Awards and nominations ==
=== London production ===
Year	Award	Category	Nominee	Result	Ref
2016	Whatsonstage.com Awards	Best New Musical		Nominated	
2016	Whatsonstage.com Awards	Best Actress In A Musical	Gemma Arterton	Nominated	
2016	Whatsonstage.com Awards	Best Set Design	Bunny Christie	Nominated	
2016	Whatsonstage.com Awards	Best Lighting Design	Jon Clark	Nominated	
2016	Laurence Olivier Award	Best Actress in a Musical	Gemma Arterton	Nominated	
2016	Laurence Olivier Award	Best Set Design	Bunny Christie	Nominated	
