= Chloe Lamford =

British scenic designer

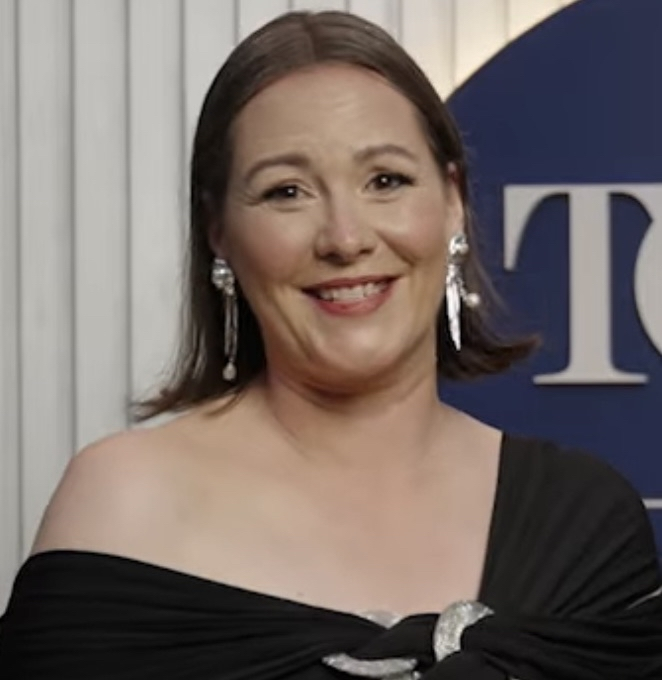
- Lamford in 2026
- Education: Wimbledon College of Arts
- Occupation: Scenic designer

Chloe Lamford is a British scenic designer. She won a Tony Award in the category Best Scenic Design for the play Death of a Salesman.
