= Bob Crowley =

Irish theatre designer (born 1952)

- Born: 10 June 1952 (age 74); Cork, Ireland
- Occupations: Theatre designer, director
- Relatives: John Crowley (brother)
- Awards: Tony Award for Best Scenic Design; Tony Award for Best Scenic Design of a Play; Tony Award for Best Scenic Design of a Musical

Bob Crowley (born 10 June 1952) is a theatre scenic and costume designer, and theatre director. Known for his work both on West End and Broadway, he lives between London, New York and West Cork. He has won seven Tony Awards for his scenic design work on Broadway, including for Carousel (1994), Aida (2000), and The History Boys (2006).

== Life and career ==
Born in Cork, Ireland on 10 June 1952, Bob Crowley is the brother of director John Crowley. He trained at the Bristol Old Vic Theatre School. He has designed over 20 productions for the Royal National Theatre including Ghetto, The Madness of George III, Carousel and The History Boys. He has also designed numerous productions for the Royal Shakespeare Company including The Plantagenets, for which he won an Olivier award, and Les Liaisons Dangereuses, which later had a successful run in London, followed by a transfer to Broadway. Opera productions include the critically acclaimed production of The Magic Flute directed by Nicholas Hytner for the English National Opera and La Traviata for the Royal Opera House.

Crowley is a frequent collaborator with Nicholas Hytner, and as well as on Broadway has worked extensively at the Royal National Theatre in London and with England's Royal Shakespeare Company.

Bob Crowley has received multiple Tony Award nominations, and has won seven times, for designing the Broadway productions of Carousel (1994), Aida (2000), The History Boys (2006), Mary Poppins (2007), The Coast of Utopia (2007), Once (2012) and An American in Paris (2015). He received three other Tony Award nominations in 2015, two for his costumes on The Audience and An American in Paris and one for his scenic designs for Skylight. He is a two-time recipient of the Laurence Olivier Award for Best Set Design and a three-time recipient of the Drama Desk Award for Outstanding Set Design.

Crowley designed set and costume for Mary Poppins, which played in both the West End and on Broadway. He designed and directed the Phil Collins musical Tarzan. He is the set and costume designer for Andrew Lloyd Webber's Love Never Dies, and the costume designer of the 2012 European version of The Little Mermaid. In 2015 he designed for three Broadway shows, The Audience, An American in Paris, and Skylight. He was the set and costumes designer of the 2022 ballet Like Water for Chocolate. In 2026, he designed the set for the West End play The Standard of Living.

== Awards and nominations ==
Year	Award	Category	Nominated work	Result
1985	Laurence Olivier Award	Designer of the Year	Henry V, Love's Labour's Lost and The Winter's Tale	Nominated
1986	Laurence Olivier Award	Designer of the Year	As You Like It and Les Liaisons Dangereuses	Nominated
1987	Tony Awards	Best Scenic Design	Les Liaisons Dangereuses	Nominated
1987	Tony Awards	Best Costume Design	Les Liaisons Dangereuses	Nominated
1987	Laurence Olivier Award	Designer of the Year	A Penny for a Song and Macbeth	Nominated
1990	Laurence Olivier Award	Designer of the Year	Ghetto, Hedda Gabler, Ma Rainey's Black Bottom and The Plantagenets	Won
1992	Laurence Olivier Award	Best Set Design	When She Danced, Murmuring Judges and The Night of the Iguana	Nominated
1993	Laurence Olivier Award	Best Set Design	Carousel, Henry IV and No Man's Land	Nominated
1993	Laurence Olivier Award	Best Costume Design	Carousel and Hamlet	Nominated
1994	Tony Awards	Best Scenic Design	Carousel	Won
1998	Tony Awards	Best Scenic Design	The Capeman	Nominated
1999	Tony Awards	Best Scenic Design	The Iceman Cometh	Nominated
1999	Tony Awards	Best Scenic Design	Twelfth Night	Nominated
2000	Tony Awards	Best Scenic Design	Aida	Won
2000	Tony Awards	Best Costume Design	Aida	Nominated
2001	Tony Awards	Best Scenic Design	The Invention of Love	Nominated
2001	Laurence Olivier Award	Best Costume Design	Cressida and The Witches of Eastwick	Nominated
2004	Laurence Olivier Award	Best Set Design	Mourning Becomes Electra	Nominated
2005	Laurence Olivier Award	Best Set Design	Mary Poppins	Nominated
2005	Laurence Olivier Award	Best Costume Design	Mary Poppins	Nominated
2006	Tony Awards	Best Scenic Design of a Play	The History Boys	Won
2007	Tony Awards	Best Scenic Design of a Play	The Coast of Utopia	Won
2007	Tony Awards	Best Scenic Design of a Musical	Mary Poppins	Won
2007	Tony Awards	Best Costume Design of a Musical	Mary Poppins	Nominated
2011	Laurence Olivier Award	Best Set Design	Love Never Dies	Nominated
2011	Laurence Olivier Award	Best Costume Design	Love Never Dies	Nominated
2012	Tony Awards	Best Scenic Design of a Musical	Once	Won
2013	Laurence Olivier Award	Best Costume Design	The Audience	Nominated
2014	Tony Awards	Best Scenic Design of a Play	The Glass Menagerie	Nominated
2014	Laurence Olivier Award	Best Set Design	Once	Nominated
2015	Tony Awards	Best Scenic Design of a Play	Skylight	Nominated
2015	Tony Awards	Best Costume Design of a Play	The Audience	Nominated
2015	Tony Awards	Best Scenic Design of a Musical	An American in Paris	Won
2015	Tony Awards	Best Costume Design of a Musical	An American in Paris	Nominated
2015	New York Drama Critics' Circle Awards	Special Citation (Distinguished Achievement in Scenic and Costume Design)		Honored
2017	Laurence Olivier Award	Best Set Design	Aladdin	Nominated
2018	Laurence Olivier Award	Best Set Design	An American in Paris	Won
2019	Laurence Olivier Award	Best Set Design	The Inheritance	Nominated
2020	Tony Awards	Best Scenic Design of a Play	The Inheritance	Nominated
2020	Tony Awards	Best Costume Design of a Play	The Inheritance	Nominated
2020	Laurence Olivier Award	Best Set Design	Mary Poppins	Won
