= John Napier (designer) =

British set designer

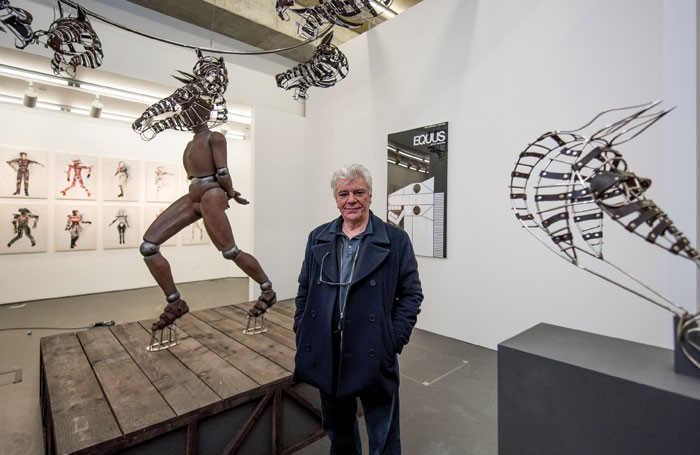
- Born: 1 March 1944 (age 82); London
- Education: Central Saint Martins College of Art and Design
- Known for: Set designer & costume designer
- Spouse(s): Andreane Neofitou; Donna King (1984–1994); Caroline McGee (2014–)
- Awards: Laurence Olivier Award for Best Set Design; Tony Award; Drama Desk Award for Outstanding Set Design

John Napier (born 1 March 1944) is a set and costume designer for Broadway and London theatrical performances.

== Education ==
John Napier was born in London. He studied at Hornsey College of Art and the Central School of Arts and Crafts, studying under notable set designer Ralph Koltai.

== Career ==
Napier earned a position as an Associate Designer at the Royal Shakespeare Company. He has designed for the National Theatre, notably the production of Peter Shaffer's Equus, Trelawny of the Wells, An Enemy of the People and Candide. John Napier has also designed for the Royal Opera House, for Glyndebourne, for the English National Opera and others. He designed Children of Eden, Who's Afraid of Virginia Woolf? and Jesus Christ Superstar in London's West End. He reworked his original designs for Equus (2007 London production).

In the United States, in addition to numerous Broadway productions, he designed and co-directed the show for illusionists Siegfried & Roy at The Mirage, Las Vegas. He also designed the Captain EO video starring Michael Jackson for Disney and the Steven Spielberg film Hook.

== Honours and awards ==
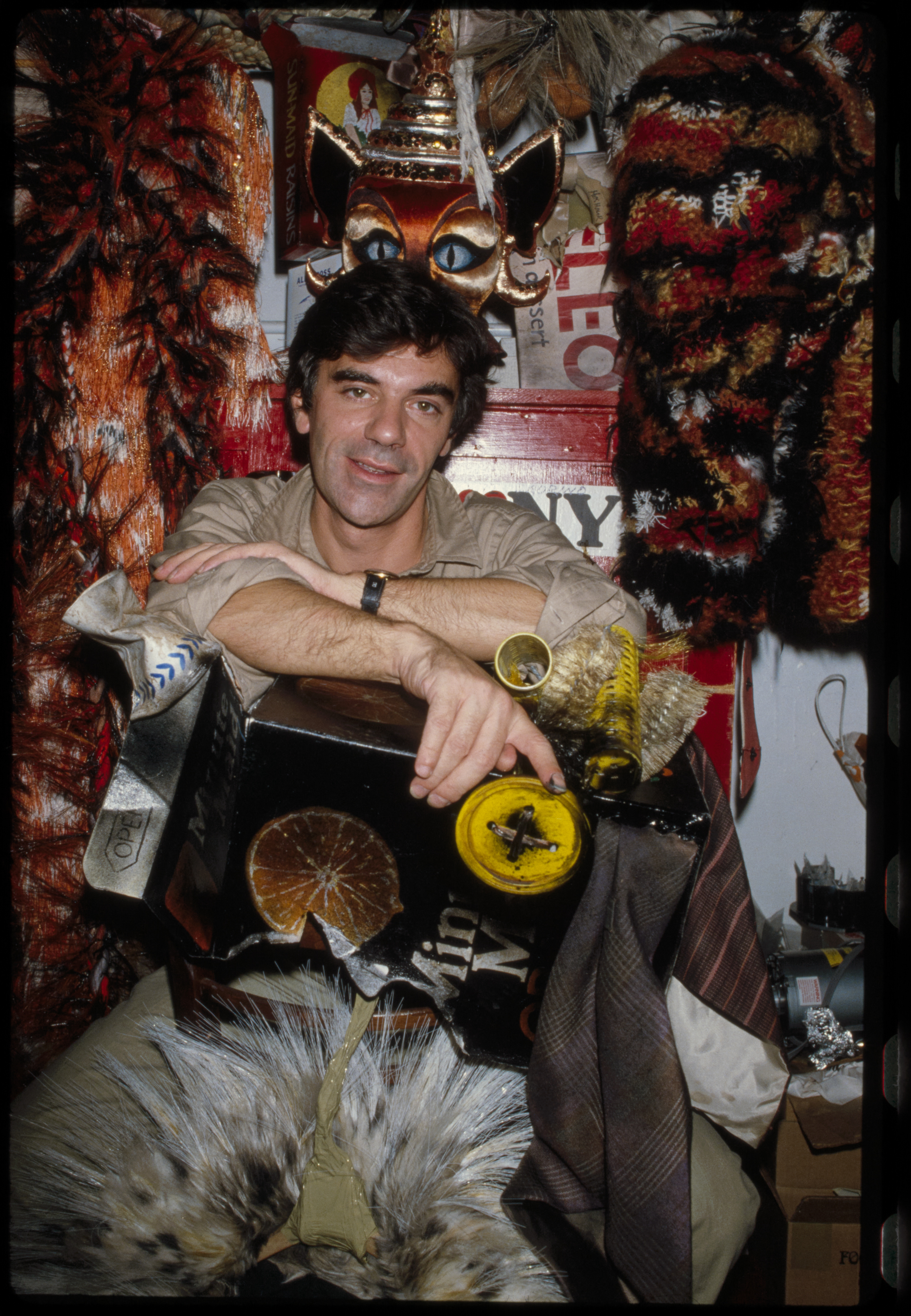
John Napier in 1982

Napier's design awards include the Laurence Olivier Award for Best Set Design for King Lear, Lohengrin, and Burning Blue. Napier has won Tony Awards for The Life and Adventures of Nicholas Nickleby, Cats, Starlight Express, Les Misérables and Sunset Boulevard.

He won the 1987 Drama Desk Award for Outstanding Set Design for Starlight Express and Les Misérables and has twice won the Drama Desk Award for Outstanding Costume Design for Cats in 1983 and Starlight Express in 1987. He has won The Critics' Circle Award for set design and twice for the, first in 1989 for Miss Saigon and again in 1997 for Peter Pan.

== Affiliations ==
Napier is a member of the American Academy of Achievement. He was elected Royal Designer for Industry in 1996 and is an Honorary Fellow of the London Institute.

== Personal life ==
Napier's first wife was Andreane Neofitou, and they had two children, Julian and Elise. Next, from 1984 to 1994, he was married to Donna King, and with her had two more children, James and Jessica. He married thirdly Caroline McGee in June 2014.

== Productions ==
=== Royal Shakespeare Company ===
- Hedda Gabler
- King Lear
- Macbeth
- Mother Courage and Her Children
- Much Ado About Nothing
- Nicholas Nickleby
- Once in a Lifetime
- Peter Pan
- Twelfth Night
- The Comedy of Errors

=== Royal National Theatre ===
- The Party
- Equus
- Trelawny of the Wells
- An Enemy of the People
- Peter Pan
- Candide
- South Pacific

=== Broadway / West End ===
- Cats
- Les Misérables
- Time
- Miss Saigon
- Starlight Express
- The Baker's Wife
- Sunset Boulevard
- Jesus Christ Superstar
- Jane Eyre
- Gone with the Wind

=== Opera ===
- Lohengrin (Covent Garden)
- Macbeth (Covent Garden)
- Idomeneo (Glyndebourne Festival Opera)
- The Devils (English National Opera)
- Nabucco (Metropolitan Opera)
