= Bunny Christie =

British set designer (born 1962)

Bunny Christie OBE
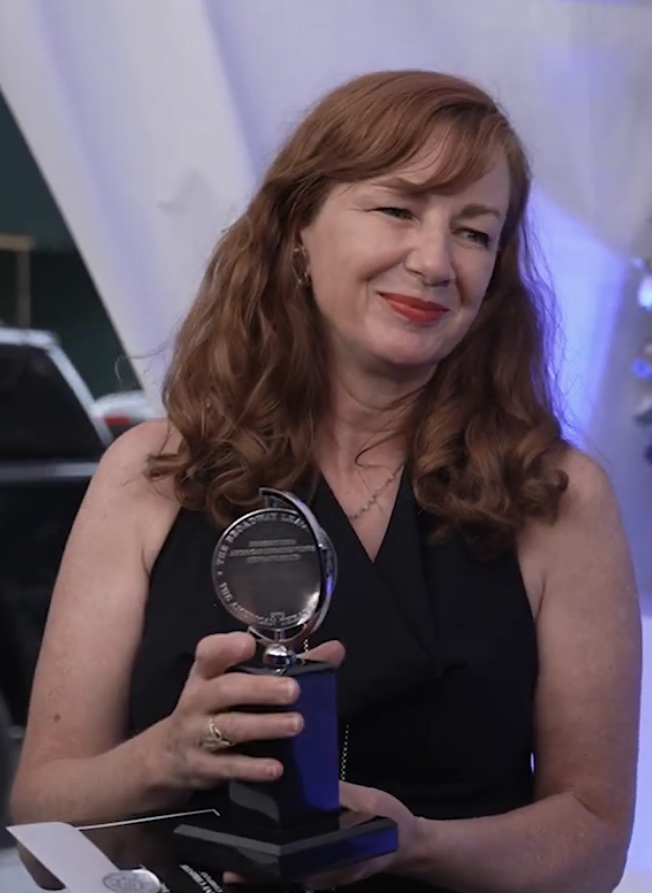
- Christie at the 75th Tony Awards in 2022
- Born: St Andrews
- Education: Madras College
- Occupation: Theatre Designer
- Known for: The Curious Incident of the Dog in the Night-Time
- Awards: 4 Olivier Awards; 2 Tony Awards
- Website: http://www.bunnychristie.co.uk

Bunny Christie OBE (born 1962) is a Scottish theatre set designer.

== Career ==
She was born in St Andrews, educated at Madras College and at the Central School of Art in London. She has won four Olivier Awards and also worked on Kenneth Branagh's Oscar-nominated short film Swan Song.

Christie designed the sets and costumes for The Curious Incident of the Dog in the Night-Time, which was initially produced at the Royal National Theatre in 2012, and also was performed on Broadway in 2014.

In 2014, Christie designed the set for the new musical Made in Dagenham. She designed the set for People, Places and Things which ran at the Royal National Theatre in 2015 and Off-Broadway at St. Ann's Warehouse in 2017.

In 2018, she designed the set for Marianne Elliot’s gender bending revival of the musical Company. The musical opened in the West End in 2018.

She was appointed Officer of the Order of the British Empire (OBE) in the 2019 New Year Honours for her services to British theatre.

David Jays, writing in The Guardian, described her style: "Bunny Christie doesn’t design stage sets. She creates worlds. Audaciously theatrical and frequently startling, her creations pull spectators headlong into the universe of a play – whether through the disorienting aperture of The Red Barn or the vintage newsroom pile-up in Ink. Christie often places us inside a protagonist’s head – she designs psychology as well as space, most notably for the singular hero of The Curious Incident, which won her one of her three Olivier awards."

== Awards and nominations ==
Year	Award	Category	Work	Result
1999	Olivier Award	Best Costume Design	As You Like It	Nominated
2000	Evening Standard Theatre Award	Best Set Design	Baby Doll	Won
2001	Olivier Award	Best Set Design	Baby Doll	Nominated
2003	Olivier Award	Best Set Design	A Streetcar Named Desire	Won
2011	Olivier Award	Best Set Design	The White Guard	Won
2013	Olivier Award	Best Set Design	The Curious Incident of the Dog in the Night-Time (with Finn Ross)	Won
2015	Tony Award	Best Scenic Design in a Play	The Curious Incident of the Dog in the Night-Time (with Finn Ross)	Won
2015	Olivier Award	Best Set Design	Made in Dagenham	Nominated
2017	Evening Standard Theatre Award	Best Set Design	Ink	Nominated
2018	Olivier Award	Best Set Design	Ink	Nominated
2018	Drama Desk Award	Outstanding Scenic Design of a Play	People, Places and Things	Nominated
2018	Critics’ Circle Theatre Award	Best Designer	Company	Won
2019	Olivier Award	Best Set Design	Company	Won
2022	Tony Award	Best Scenic Design in a Musical	Company	Won
2022	Drama Desk Award	Outstanding Scenic Design of a Musical	Company	Nominated
