= Ralph Koltai =

German-born British stage designer (1924–2018)

Ralph Koltai CBE, RDI
- Born: 31 July 1924; Berlin, Germany
- Died: 15 December 2018 (aged 94); Châtellerault, Vienne, France
- Occupations: Stage designer; Sculptor
- Employer: Royal Shakespeare Company
- Website: ralphkoltai.com

Ralph Koltai CBE, RDI (31 July 1924 – 15 December 2018), was a German-born, naturalised British stage designer, who worked as associate designer of the Royal Shakespeare Company, and latterly as a sculptor.

== Early life ==
Koltai was born on 31 July 1924, in Berlin, Germany, to a family of Jewish descent. He was the only child of a Hungarian-born doctor Alfred and his wife Charlotte (née Weinstein) Koltai who was German. Their son was on the Kindertransport from Brussels to England in 1939. His parents survived the Holocaust; his mother was able to settle in Britain, while his father began again in Cuba. Koltai worked as a translator at the Nuremberg trials and later for the British Intelligence Corps as an investigator of war crimes. His military service ended in 1948.

From 1943, Koltai trained to a commercial artist at Epsom School of Art before he entered the military. From 1948 to 1951, he studied at the Central School of Arts and Crafts (now Central Saint Martins) where he was later the head of theatre design between 1965 and 1972.

== Career as a set designer ==
Soon after his graduation, his designs for Sadler's Wells Opera, Covent Garden Opera and Ballet Rambert began to gain notice.

Koltai was influenced by European theatre practitioners such as Bertolt Brecht and Vsevolod Meyerhold. "What I wanted to do was to find a single image which would express what the author was saying, rather than just provide illustrations," he said of his design principles. "I wanted to show the idea, the concept." He told critic Michael Billington in 1984 that he attempted to find "a style that seeks to find the right metaphor for each work." In 1963, for the RSC at the Aldwych Theatre, London, he set Rolf Hochhuth's The Deputy (also known as The Representative), about Pope Pius XII's connection to the Nazis. He later commented: "My concept was to set it in a gas chamber that was also the Pope’s study—it showed that the Vatican and the extermination chambers were part of each other." His first work for the RSC had been the previous year's production of Brecht's The Caucasian Chalk Circle.

In 1984, when an RSC production of Rostand's Cyrano de Bergerac was being performed on Broadway, he told critic Michael Billington that he saw himself as a painter who treats the play as an art object. He commented that he did not "respond well to being told what is wanted. I like to make a conceptual contribution where you half need to direct the play yourself."

In later life he lived in France taking found objects on local farms made of wood, metal and turning them into sculptures. One of these creations, a tree root, was surrounded by water in his stage design for Samuel West's revival of Howard Brenton's The Romans in Britain at the Crucible Theatre, Sheffield, in 2006. In 2010 his metal collage sculptures were exhibited at the Royal National Theatre.

== Interviews ==
Koltai was interviewed by Sue Lawley in 1998 for the BBC radio programme Desert Island Discs. National Life Stories conducted an oral history interview (C1173/01) with Koltai in 2002–2003 for its An Oral History of Theatre Design collection held by the British Library. Koltai also took part in Rambert's 90th anniversary oral history project, talking about his work for dance.

The year before his death, Koltai was interviewed for TheatreVOICE at the Victoria and Albert Museum by Heather Neill. Of his career, he said “Whatever talent I had, it was instinct; I’ve never made a decision. I often arrive at the resolution by accident. The talent that I have is to recognise the accident when it happens.”

== Honours ==
Koltai was made a Commander of the Order of the British Empire (CBE) in the 1983 New Year Honours and was recognised as a Royal Designer for Industry (RDI) by the Royal Society of Arts in 1984.

== Death ==
At the end of his life, Koltai lived at "Le Bas-Foncluse" farm in La Celle-Guenand in France. He died on 15 December 2018, at the age of 94, at Châtellerault.

== Bibliography ==
- Designer for the Stage. Nick Hern Books. 2003. ISBN 978-1854597847.
