= Richard Hudson (stage designer) =

Zimbabwean stage designer (born 1954)

- Born: 9 June 1954 (age 71)
- Citizenship: Zimbabwe, United Kingdom
- Occupations: Scenographer, Costume designer

Richard Hudson (born 9 June 1954) is a Zimbabwean stage designer best known for his work for The Lion King, which won him the Tony Award for Best Scenic Design and the Drama Desk Award for Outstanding Set Design. He studied at Wimbledon School of Art.

Hudson is also a Royal Designer for Industry. He won the Laurence Olivier Award for Best Set Design for his work at The Old Vic, the gold medal for set design at the 2003 Prague Quadriennale, and an honorary doctorate from the University of Surrey in 2005.

Hudson has designed sets and costumes for the Royal Shakespeare Company, the Royal National Theatre, the Young Vic and The Gate, London. In opera he has worked at the Royal Opera House, English National Opera, La Scala, Milan, Metropolitan Opera, New York City, Opéra National de Paris, Lyric Opera of Chicago, Vienna State Opera, Glyndebourne Festival Opera and in Zürich, Munich, Amsterdam, Venice, Florence, Turin, Bregenz, Houston and Washington, D.C.

National Life Stories conducted an oral history interview (C1173/17) with Hudson in 2006-2008 for its An Oral History of Theatre Design collection held by the British Library.
