= Hildegard Bechtler =

German-born, London-based costume and set designer (born 1951)

Hildegard Maria Bechtler (born 14 November 1951) is a German costume and set designer. Born in Baden and raised in Stuttgart, she moved to London in the 1970s and has been working there ever since. She has created designs for numerous plays on the London stage. She has also worked extensively in opera. She won the 2011 Olivier Award for Best Costume Design for her work on the National Theatre revival of After the Dance, and was nominated for the 2026 Tony Award for Best Scenic Design of a Play for Oedipus.

== Personal life ==
In 1984, Bechtler married the actor Bill Paterson. They have a son and daughter.

== Stage credits ==
Year	Title	Role	Venue	Ref.
2005	Primo	Scenic Designer, Costume Designer	Broadway, Music Box Theatre	
2006	My Name is Rachel Corrie	Designer	Off-Broadway, Minetta Lane Theatre	
2008	The Seagull	Costume Designer	Broadway, Walter Kerr Theatre	
2009	Hedda Gabler	Scenic Designer	Broadway, American Airlines Theatre	
2011	Blithe Spirit	Scenic Designer, Costume Designer	West End, Apollo Theatre	
2011	Arcadia	Scenic Designer	Broadway, Ethel Barrymore Theatre	
2012	Top Hat	Scenic Designer	West End, Aldwych Theatre	
2015	Oresteia	Designer	West End, Trafalgar Theatre	
2017	Hamlet	Costume Designer	West End, Almeida Theatre	
2017	Hamlet	Costume Designer	West End, Harold Pinter Theatre	
2018	Mary Stuart	Scenic Designer, Costume Designer	West End, Duke of York's Theatre	
2019	Hansard	Scenic Designer, Costume Designer	West End, National Theatre	
2019	A Taste of Honey	Scenic Designer, Costume Designer	West End, Trafalgar Theatre	
2021	Four Quartets	Scenic Designer, Costume Designer	West End, Harold Pinter Theatre	
2022	Hamlet	Scenic Designer, Costume Designer	Off-Broadway, Park Avenue Armory	
2022	Oresteia	Scenic Designer, Costume Designer	Off-Broadway, Park Avenue Armory	
2024	Oedipus	Scenic Design	West End, Wyndham's Theatre	
2024	Dr. Strangelove	Scenic Designer, Costume Designer	West End, Noël Coward Theatre	
2025	Manhunt	Designer	West End, Royal Court Theatre	
2025	Oedipus	Scenic Design	Broadway, Studio 54	
2026	Romeo and Juliet	Scenic Designer, Costume Designer	West End, Harold Pinter Theatre	
2026	The Lives of Others	Scenic Designer	West End, Adelphi Theatre	

== Awards and nominations ==
Year	Award	Category	Work	Result	Ref.
2011	Laurence Olivier Award	Best Costume Design	After the Dance	Won	
2016	Laurence Olivier Award	Best Set Design	Oresteia	Nominated	
2026	Tony Award	Best Scenic Design of a Play	Oedipus	Nominated	
