= Ian MacNeil (scenic designer) =

Scenic designer (born 1960)

Ian MacNeil (born 1960) is a British-based scenic designer. He won the 1994 Drama Desk Award for Outstanding Set Design for An Inspector Calls and the 2009 Tony Award for Best Scenic Design of a Musical for Billy Elliot The Musical.

== Early life and career ==
The son of news anchor and journalist Robert MacNeil, he became interested in design at an early age, playing with toy theaters and creating puppet shows with his sister in their yard. "I still remember the pleasure I took in creating those little worlds - complete environments with characters I could manipulate", he recalled in a 1995 interview.

MacNeil graduated from Trinity College, Hartford (Hartford, Connecticut) in 1980 and studied at the Croydon School of Art and later with Ming Cho Lee in New York City.

He spent a decade designing productions in Birmingham, Worcester, York, and Manchester before moving to London, where he made his West End debut with Death and the Maiden in 1991.

MacNeil has designed for many London venues, including the National Theatre, the English National Opera, the Almeida Theatre, the Young Vic, the Lyric Hammersmith, the Barbican Theatre, and the Royal Court Theatre. He has won the Laurence Olivier Award for Best Set Design twice, for An Inspector Calls and Ariodante.

In 1999, MacNeil staged the international tour of the Pet Shop Boys promoting the release of their album Nightlife.

== Personal life ==
Ian MacNeil is openly gay. In 1993, Robert MacNeil spoke publicly about his son's homosexuality at the National Lesbian and Gay Journalists Association convention, and in a 1994 episode of The MacNeil/Lehrer NewsHour, the two discussed their relationship. "It's terribly important that a public figure say I love my gay son," the younger MacNeil has said. "It needs to be within the sphere of what's everyday and ordinary, and not be gothic."

MacNeil and director Stephen Daldry were involved in a relationship for 13 years. They met at an outdoor production of Alice in Wonderland in Lancaster in 1988 and, after seeing each other sporadically, Daldry decided he wanted to make a commitment. MacNeil was more reticent, but eventually the two settled in a bedsit in Camberwell and began collaborating on theatrical productions.
