= William Dudley (designer) =

British theatre designer (1947–2025)

William Dudley OBE RDI (4 March 1947 – 31 May 2025) was a British theatre designer.

== Background ==
Dudley was the son of William Stuart Dudley and his wife Dorothy Irene (née Stacey). He attended Highbury Grammar School.

He was educated at Saint Martin's School of Art and the Slade School of Art. He was a member of the Society of British Theatre Designers. He was married to the theatre director Lucy Bailey.

National Life Stories conducted an oral history interview (C1173/27) with Dudley in 2007–2008 for its An Oral History of Theatre Design collection held by the British Library.

Dudley died from complications of dementia on 31 May 2025, at the age of 78.

== Career ==
Dudley designed his first production in October 1970, Hamlet for Nottingham Playhouse. Since then, he has designed the following productions:

- The Duchess of Malfi (Royal Court) – 1971
- Man Is Man, Bertolt Brecht (Royal Court) – 1971
- Anarchist (Royal Court Upstairs) – 1971
- Tyger (co-designed for the National Theatre) – July 1971
- Cato Street (Young Vic) – 1971
- The Good Natur'd Man (National) – 1971
- Live Like Pigs (Royal Court Upstairs) – 1972
- I Claudius (Queen's Theatre) – 1972
- The Baker, the Baker's Wife and the Baker's Boy (Newcastle) – 1972
- Rooted (Hampstead Theatre) – March 1973
- Magnificence; Sweet Talk and The Merry-Go-Round (Royal Court) – 1973
- Ashes (Open Space) – January 1974
- The Corn is Green (Watford Palace) – 1974
- Twelfth Night, director Peter Gill (RSC Stratford) – August 1974
- Harding's Luck (Greenwich Theatre) – December 1974
- Fish in the Sea (Half Moon Theatre) – February 1975
- As You Like It (Nottingham Playhouse) – 1975
- The Fool (Royal Court) – 1975
- The Norman Conquests (Berlin) – 1976
- Small Change, Peter Gill (Royal Court) – July 1976
- As You Like It (opening of Riverside Studios) – May 1976
- Ivanov, director David Jones (RSC Aldwych Theatre) – September 1976
- The Cherry Orchard, director Peter Gill, (Riverside Studios) – January 1978
- That Good Between Us (RSC Donmar Warehouse) – July 1977
- Lavender Blue (National, Cottesloe) – November 1977
- Touched (Nottingham Playhouse at the Old Vic) – September 1977
- The World Turned Upside Down (National, Cottesloe) – 2 November 1978
- Has 'Washington' Legs? (National, Cottesloe) – 29 November 1978
- Billy Budd (The Metropolitan Opera House, New York) – 1978
- Dispatches (National, Cottesloe) – 6 June 1979
- Undiscovered Country (National, Olivier) – 20 June 1979
- Lark Rise to Candleford (National, Cottesloe) – 1979
- The Tales of Hoffman by Offenbach (dir. John Schlesinger) Royal Opera House – 1980
- Don Quixote (National, Olivier) – 1982
- Schweyk in the Second World War, Bertolt Brecht (National, Olivier) – 1982
- Small Change (National, Cottesloe) – 1983
- Cinderella, Pantomime (National, Lyttelton) – December 1983
- The Ring Cycle by Richard Wagner (dir. Peter Hall con. Georg Solti) Bayreuth Festival – 1983
- The Mysteries: Doomsday/The Nativity/The Passion, designed and lit (National, Cottesloe; Lyceum Theatre) – 1985
- The Party (RSC The Pit) – 1985
- Richard III (RSC Barbican Theatre) – 1985
- Today (RSC The Pit) – 1985
- Mutiny, David Essex musical (Piccadilly Theatre) – 1985
- The Critic/The Real Inspector Hound (National, Olivier) – 1985
- Edmond, David Mamet (Royal Court) – 1985
- The Merry Wives of Windsor (RSC Barbican Theatre) – 1986 and 1987
- Futurists (National, Cottesloe) – 1986
- Prairie du Chien/The Shawl (Royal Court Upstairs) – 1986
- Kafka's Dick (Royal Court) – 1986
- Country Dancing (RSC The Pit) – 1987
- Richard II (RSC Barbican Theatre) – 1987
- Entertaining Strangers (National, Cottesloe) – 1987
- Girlfriends, Howard Goodall musical (Playhouse Theatre) – 1987
- Waiting for Godot (National, Lyttelton) – 1987
- Cat on a Hot Tin Roof (National, Lyttelton) – 1988
- The Shaughran (National, Olivier) – 1988 and 1989
- The Changeling (National, Lyttelton) – 1988
- The Father, August Strindberg (National, Cottesloe) – 1988
- The Voysey Inheritance (National, Cottesloe) – 1989
- Cat on a Hot Tin Roof (dir Howard Davies) New York – 1990
- Cunning Little Vixen by Janáček (dir. Bill Bryden) Royal Opera House - June 1990
- The Ship (dir. Bill Bryden) Harland and Wolf Shipyard, Glasgow – 1990
- Lucia di Lammermoor by Donizetti (dir. Andrei Serban) Lyric Opera, Chicago – November 1990
- Pygmailion by George Bernard Shaw (dir.Howard Davies) NT Olivier – April 1992
- Heartbreak House by George Bernard Shaw (dir. Trevor Nunn) Haymarket, London – June 1992
- The Rise and Fall of Little Voice by Jim Cartright (dir. Sam Mendes) NT Cottesloe – 1992
- The Big Picnic (dir. Bill Bryden) Harland and Wolf Shipyard, Glasgow – 1994
- My Night with Reg by Kevin Elyot (dir. Roger Michell) Royal Court, London – 1994
- Persuasion by Jane Austen (Film) (dir. Roger Michell) BBC – 1995 (BAFTA for design)
- Some Sunny Day by Martin Sherman (dir. Roger Michell) Hampstead Theatre – 1996
- Mary Stuart by Friedrich von Schiller (dir Howard Davies) National Lyttelton – March 1996
- I Licked a Slags Deodorant by Jim Cartwright (dir Jim Cartwright) Royal Court 1996
- The Alchemist by Ben Johnson (dir. Bill Alexander) Birmingham Rep/NT Olivier – October 1996
- The Homecoming by Harold Pinter (dir. Roger Michell) National Theatre, Lyttelton – Jan 1997
- Dance of the Vampires (dir. Roman Polanski) Raimund Theatre, Vienna – October 1997
- The London Cuckolds by Edward Ravenscroft (dir Terry Johnson) National Lyttelton – February 1998
- Cleo, Camping, Emmanuel and Dick by Terry Johnson (dir Terry Johnson) National Lyttelton – September 1998
- Lenny (dir Peter Hall) Queens Theatre – July 1999
- Amadeus (dir Peter Hall) Old Vic – October 1998; New York – 1999
- Rose Theatre Interactive Exhibition Bankside, London – 1999
- The Silver Tassie – Sean O'Casey – Mark Anthony Turnage (dir. Bill Bryden) ENO – February 2000
- Blue/Orange by Joe Penhall (dir Roger Michell), National Cottesloe – April 2000; Duchess Theatre – April 2001
- All My Sons by Arthur Miller (dir Howard Davies) National Lyttelton – July 2000; National Lyttelton – August 2001
- Entertaining Mr Sloane (dir Terry Johnson ) Arts Theatre – January 2001
- The York Realist (written and dir Peter Gill) Royal Court – January 2002; Strand Theatre – March 2002
- The Coast of Utopia: Voyage/Shipwreck/Salvage, trilogy by Tom Stoppard (dir Trevor Nunn) National – August 2002
- The Breath of Life by David Hare (dir Howard Davies) Theatre Royal Haymarket – October 2002
- Honour by Joanna Murray-Smith (dir Roger Michell) National Cottesloe – 2003
- Hitchcock Blonde (written and dir Terry Johnson) Royal Court and Lyric Theatre – 2003
- The Permanent Way by David Hare (dir Max Stafford Clark) National Cottesloe – January 2004
- Cyrano de Bergerac (dir Howard Davies) National Olivier – April 2004
- Old Times by Harold Pinter (dir Roger Michell) Donmar Warehouse – July 2004
- The Woman in White musical by Andrew Lloyd Webber (dir Trevor Nunn) Palace Theatre – September 2004; New York – 2005
- Titus Andronicus (dir Lucy Bailey) Shakespeare's Globe – 2006
- Giant By Anthony Sher - Hampstead Theatre, London – 2007
- The Last Confession by Roger Crane (dir. David Jones) Chichester Festival Theatre – 2007
- Landscape with Weapon by Joe Penhall (dir. Roger Michelle) NT Cottesloe - 2007
- Peter Pan 360 (dir. Ben Harrison) Kensington Gardens, London – 2009
- End of the Rainbow by Peter Quilter (dir.Terry Johnson) Trafalgar Studios, London – 2010
- The Beggar's Opera (dir Lucy Bailey) Open Air Theatre, Regent's Park – 2011
- Fortune's Fool (dir Lucy Bailey) The Old Vic – 2013.
- Fings Ain't Wot They Used T'be' by Frank Norman/Lionel Bart (dir.Terry Johnson) Theatre Royal, Stratford East – 2014
- Sunday in the Park with George, (dir. Lee Blakeley) Théâtre du Châtelet, Paris – April 2013
- Gaslight by Patrick Hamilton (dir. Lucy Bailey) Royal and Derngate, Northampton – 2015
- The Rehearsal by Jean Anouilh (dir. Jeremy Sams) CFT, Minerva – May 2015
- Ross by Terence Rattigan (dir. Adrian Noble) Chichester Festival Theatre – June 2016
- Comus by John Milton (dir. Lucy Bailey) Sam Wanamaker Playhouse – October 2016
- For Services Rendered by W Somerset Maugham (dir. Howard Davies) CFT, Minerva – August 2015
- Witness for the Prosecution by Agatha Christie (dir. Lucy Bailey) London County Hall – 2017
- Switzerland by Joanna Murray-Smith (dir. Lucy Bailey) Ustinov Studio, Bath – August 2018

== Honours and awards ==
Awards include:

- Olivier Awards 1979, Designer of the Year for Undiscovered Country
- Olivier Awards 1985, Designer of the Year for The Mysteries and The Critics
- Olivier Awards 1986, Designer of the Year for The Futurists, Kafka's Dick and Merry Wives of Windsor
- Olivier Awards 1993, Olivier Award for Best Costume Design for Heartbreak House & The Rise and Fall of Little Voice
- BAFTA 1995 – Best Production Design for Persuasion
- Royal Television Society 1995 - Best Production Design for Persuasion
- Olivier Awards 1999, Olivier Award for Best Costume Design for Amadeus & The London Cuckolds
- Olivier Awards 2001, Olivier Award for Best Set Design for All My Sons
- Critics' Circle Theatre Awards 2002, Best Designer for The Coast of Utopia Trilogy
- Olivier Awards 2004, Olivier Award for Best Set Design for Hitchcock Blonde

Dudley was appointed Officer of the Order of the British Empire (OBE) in the 2021 New Year Honours for services to stage design.

== Bibliography ==
- Who's Who in the Theatre (17th Edition), Gale (1981). ISBN 0-8103-0234-9.
- The National: The Theatre and its Work 1963–97 by Simon Callow, Nick Hern Books (1997). ISBN 1-85459-323-4.
- Theatre Record and its annual Indexes.
- Stage Design by Tony Davis, Rotavision SA (2001). ISBN 2-88046-506-0.
