= Tim Hatley =

British set and costume designer

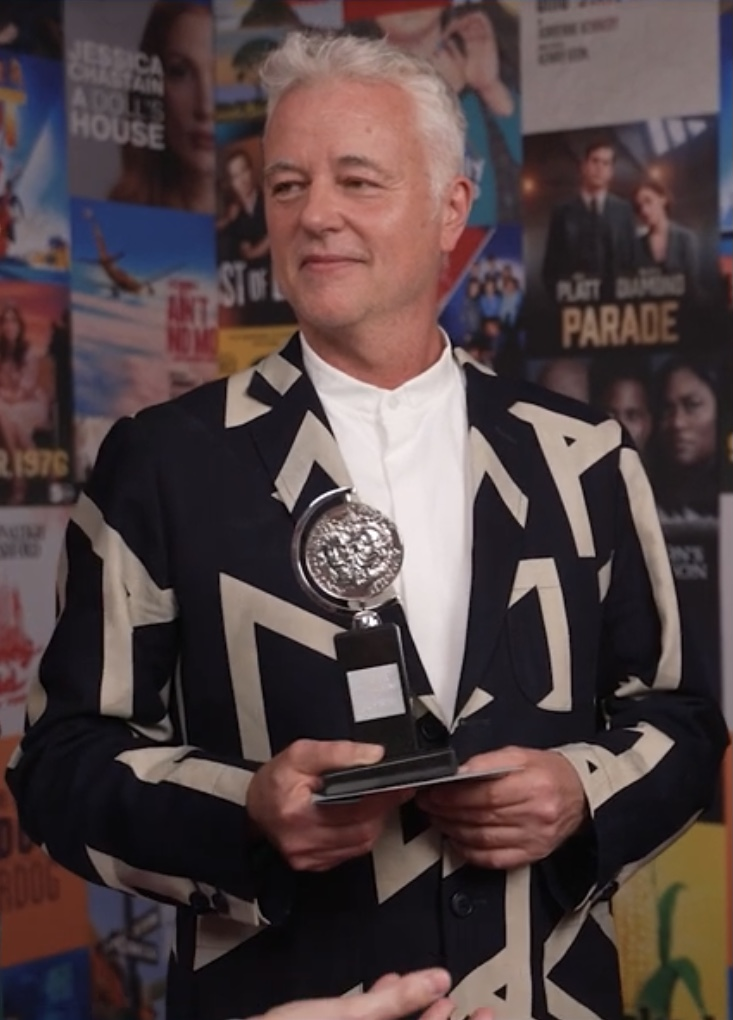
- Hatley at the 76th Tony Awards in 2023
- Education: Central Saint Martins

Tim Hatley is a British set and costume designer for theatre and film. He has won the Tony Award for Best Set Design and Best Costume Design, the Drama Desk Award for Outstanding Set Design, the Drama Desk Award for Outstanding Costume Design, and the Laurence Olivier Award for Best Set Design.

Hatley was educated at Bearwood College, Berkshire and trained in Theatre Design at Central Saint Martins College of Art and Design in London from 1986 to 1989. He has designed for Théâtre de Complicité, the Royal Shakespeare Company, the Royal National Theatre, the West End, and Broadway. He has designed the costumes and/or scenic design for seven Broadway productions, both musicals and dramas, starting with Stanley in 1996 through Shrek the Musical in 2008.

== Work ==
=== Films ===
Stage Beauty 2003 (dir. Richard Eyre) Closer 2004 (dir. Mike Nichols) Notes on a Scandal 2006 (dir. Richard Eyre).

=== Stage ===
For the West End: Dreamgirls (Savoy); Travesties (Menier Chocolate Factory); Mr Foote's Other Leg (by Ian Kelly); Little Eyolf & Ghosts - both written by Ibsen and directed by Richard Eyre; Temple (Donmar Warehouse); The Pajama Game (Chichester & West End). He was costume and set designer for the musical The Bodyguard and Simon Gray's drama, Quartermaine's Terms, Monty Python musical Spamalot (2006).

He designed sets, costumes and puppets for Shrek the Musical (Broadway, West End, UK & US Tours), sets and costumes for Betty Blue Eyes (West End 2011), Private Lives (2001, Noël Coward Theatre) and Humble Boy (2002, Gielgud Theatre), Life of Pi (West End, Broadway), Back To The Future The Musical (West End, Broadway). At the National Theatre he has designed over 20 productions, including Timon of Athens, Welcome to Thebes, Rafta, Rafta..., Henry V, and Vincent in Brixton. Endgame in September 2009 (Théâtre de Complicité/ West End) and Mrs Klein in October 2009 (Almeida Theatre).

== Review ==
In May 2013, the hit musical, The Bodyguard, was staged at London’s Adelphi Theatre, the theme adapted from the 1992 film The Bodyguard. It was a stage musical with Heather Headley as the superstar singer Rachel Marron and Lloyd Owen as Frank Farmer, an ex-Secret Service agent turned bodyguard. Tim Hatley was set and costume designer, along with director Thea Sharrock, lighting designer Mark Henderson and video designer Duncan McLean and rest of the team. Hatley turned the stage show brilliantly to glide like the real movie. "I think it's always a tricky thing having a film going onto the stage", was what Hatley had to say about his work.

== Exhibition Design ==
Vivienne Westwood- a London Fashion, at the Museum of London "Diaghilev and the Golden Age of the Ballets Russes" at "Victoria and Albert Museum"

== Awards ==
- 1997 Laurence Olivier Award for Best Set Design for Stanley
- 2002 Tony Award for Best Scenic Design and Drama Desk Award for Private Lives
- 2002 Laurence Olivier Award for Best Set Design for Humble Boy and Private Lives
- 2009 Outer Critics Circle Award for Outstanding Set and Costume Design for Shrek the Musical
- 2005 Tony Award for Best Scenic Design nomination for Spamalot
- 2005 Tony Award for Best Costume Design nomination for Spamalot
- 2009 Tony Award for Best Costume Design for Shrek the Musical
- 2009 Drama Desk Award for Outstanding Set Design for Shrek the Musical
- 2009 Drama Desk Award for Outstanding Costume Design for Shrek the Musical
- 2011 Laurence Olivier Award for Best Costume Design nomination for Shrek the Musical
- 2013 Laurence Olivier Award for Best Set Design nomination for The Bodyguard
- 2014 Evening Standard Award nomination for Ghosts
- 2015 Evening Standard Award nomination for Temple
