= Anthony Ward =

British scenic designer (born 1957)

Anthony Ward (born 1957) is a British theatre designer specializing in set and costume design. He studied theatre design at Wimbledon School of Art.

He has designed productions for the Royal National Theatre, Royal Shakespeare Company, Donmar Warehouse and the Almeida Theatre. Recent productions include the revival of Stephen Sondheim's play Sweeney Todd, directed by Jonathan Kent (Chichester Festival Theatre/Adelphi Theatre), Posh (Royal Court/Duke of York Theatre), Enron (Royal Court/Chichester Festival Theatre). Ward's West End musical credits include My Fair Lady, Oklahoma!, Oliver! and Chitty Chitty Bang Bang.

Ward designed Sam Mendes' inaugural production, Assassins, at the Donmar Warehouse and Mary Stuart, directed by Phyllida Lloyd, which transferred to the West End and Broadway and received a Tony Award for Best Costume Design.

Opera productions include productions of Gloriana and Peter Grimes directed by Phyllida Lloyd for Opera North, and Il ritorno d'Ulisse in patria directed by Adrian Noble for the Festival d'Aix-en-Provence.

For dance he designed Matthew Bourne's Nutcracker! (Sadler's Wells and UK tour) and most recently The Nutcracker for Nikolaj Hübbe at the Royal Danish Ballet.

Ward's partner is Mark Thompson, the Olivier award-winning and Tony-nominated international costume and set designer for stage and screen. They share a house in Kent and a studio in London with their grey Italian whippet.

== Awards and nominations ==
Awards include:

(2009) Tony Award Best Costume Design of a Play for Mary Stuart, (2008) Touring Broadway Award for Best Set &Costume Design My Fair Lady. (2003) OBIE Award Set Design Uncle Vanya, (2003) What's on Stage Theatregoers Choice Award for Set Design Chitty Chitty Bang Bang (2001) Outer Critics Circle Award for Set Design Oklahoma!, (1999) Olivier Award for Set Design Oklahoma! (1996) Olivier Award for Costume Design Midsummer Night’s Dream, La Grande Magia & The Way of the World

Nominations include:

Olivier Award Nomination: (2006) for Best Costume Design Mary Stuart (2003) Best Set Design for Chitty Chitty Bang Bang (2002) Best Set & Costume Design for My Fair Lady (1995) Best Set Design for The Tempest (1994) Best Set & Costume Design for The Winter’s Tale

Tony Award Nominations: (2007/8) Macbeth Set design (2004/05) Set Design Chitty Chitty Bang Bang (1995/96) Set design A Midsummer Night’s Dream

Drama Desk Award Nominations: (2004/2005) Outstanding Set and Costume Design for Chitty Chitty Bang Bang, (2001/2002) Outstanding Set Design for Oklahoma! Evening Standard Award Nominations: (2007) Best Set Design for Macbeth.
