= No Man's Land (play) =

1974 play by Harold Pinter

No Man's Land is a play by Harold Pinter written in 1974 and first produced and published in 1975. Its original production was at the Old Vic theatre in London by the National Theatre on 23 April 1975, and it later transferred to Wyndham's Theatre, July 1975 – January 1976, the Lyttelton Theatre April–May 1976, and New York's Longacre Theatre from October – December 1976. It returned to the Lyttelton from January – February 1977. It is a two-act play.

== Setting ==
"A large room in a house in North West London" on a summer night and the following morning.

== Characters ==
- Hirst, a man in his sixties
- Spooner, a man in his sixties
- Foster, a man in his thirties
- Briggs, a man in his forties

Hirst is an alcoholic upper-class litterateur who lives in a grand house presumed to be in Hampstead, with Foster and Briggs, respectively his purported amanuensis and manservant (or apparent bodyguard), who may be lovers. Spooner, a "failed, down-at-heel poet" whom Hirst has "picked up in a Hampstead pub" and invited home for a drink, becomes Hirst's house guest for the night; claiming to be a fellow poet, through a contest of at least-partly fantastic reminiscences, he appears to have known Hirst at university and to have shared male and female acquaintances and relationships. The four characters are named after cricket players. It has been suggested that Spooner was originally inspired by the poet Eddie Linden, whom Pinter knew.

== Plot synopsis ==
=== Act 1 ===
In the 1970s, Hirst, an ageing man of means begins a night of heavy drinking in his drawing room with an anonymous peer whom he only just met at a pub. Hirst's talkative and somewhat disheveled guest, calling himself a poet, long-windedly explains how he is penetratingly perceptive, until he finally introduces himself as "Spooner". The pair becomes increasingly intoxicated, Hirst remaining quiet as Spooner rambles on, culminating in his taunting Hirst's masculinity and wife. Suddenly, Hirst rises and throws his glass, merely commenting "No man's land...does not move...or change...or grow old...remains...forever...icy...silent", before collapsing twice and crawling out of the room. Two domestic employees of Hirst's, younger men named Foster and Briggs, enter, talk aimlessly, and question Spooner, who now becomes the softspoken man in the room.

Eventually, Hirst reenters and struggles to remember a recent dream. All are now drinking, and Hirst mentions an album of photographs he keeps, commenting on the appearances of the people in the album. He does not seem to remember Spooner's identity, insisting that his true friends are kept safely in the album. Becoming less and less coherent, Hirst continues to ponder his dream—involving someone drowning—when Spooner abruptly says that he was the one drowning in the dream. Hirst drunkenly collapses again and Spooner now rushes in to Hirst's aid, brushing away the two younger men and claiming to be Hirst's true friend. The younger pair becomes defensive and accusatory, asserting their obligation to protect Hirst against "men of evil". Briggs helps Hirst out of the room, and Foster concludes to Spooner, "Listen. You know what it's like when you're in a room with the light on and then suddenly the light goes out? I'll show you. It's like this". He flicks off the lights, causing a blackout.

=== Act 2 ===
Alone the next morning, Spooner stands from his chair and attempts to leave, but the door is locked. Briggs, Hirst's manservant, soon enters; he delivers food and champagne, ignores Spooner's queries about the locked door, and calls the other men poets. Hirst himself then bursts in, delighted to see Spooner, whom he strangely mistakes for, or pretends is, an old friend. He speaks as though he and Spooner were Oxbridge classmates in the 1930s, and the two bizarrely discuss scandalous romantic encounters they had with the same women, leading to a series of increasingly questionable reminiscences and ending with Spooner directly accusing Hirst of having an affair with his wife.

Hirst separately launches into a rant about once-known faces in his photo album, and all four men are soon present once more, drinking champagne. An odd dynamic emerges where Spooner first pities the younger men's employment but then ends up requesting employment from Hirst himself. After all this, Hirst merely replies "Let's change the subject for the last time", which he instantly regrets, since this is taken to mean that Hirst will be unable to change the subject ever again. He thinks back to his youth, when he mistakenly thought he saw a drowned body in a lake. Spooner now comments, "No. You are in no man's land. Which never moves, which never changes, which never grows older, but which remains forever, icy and silent." Hirst responds "I'll drink to that!" and the lights fade slowly to black.

== Production history ==
The London première of No Man's Land, directed by Peter Hall, opened at the Old Vic Theatre (then home to the National Theatre), on 24 April 1975, starring John Gielgud as Spooner and Ralph Richardson as Hirst and with Michael Feast as Foster and Terence Rigby as Briggs. It transferred to Wyndham's Theatre, in London's West End, on 15 July 1975 (Baker and Ross xxxiii). This production transferred to the Longacre Theatre in New York from October through December 1976, with Richardson nominated for the 1977 Tony Award for Best Performance by a Leading Actor in a Play for his performance as Hirst. Peter Hall's production returned to the National Theatre (NT), playing at the Lyttelton Theatre, from January through February 1977. The original production with Richardson and Gielgud was filmed for the National Theatre Archive and has been shown on British television as part of Pinter at the BBC on BBC Four. The production was also recorded and released by Caedmon Records and was nominated for a Grammy Award.

A major revival at the Almeida Theatre that later transferred to the Harold Pinter Theatre (called the Comedy Theatre at the time), London, directed by David Leveaux, opened in February 1993, and starred Paul Eddington as Spooner and Pinter himself as Hirst; Douglas Hodge played Foster and Gawn Grainger played Briggs.

In the Broadway revival by the Roundabout Theatre Company directed by David Jones, which opened on 27 February 1994 at the Criterion Centre Stage Right Theatre, in New York City, with Jason Robards as Hirst, Christopher Plummer (nominated for a Tony Award for Best Performance by a Leading Actor in a Play) as Spooner, Tom Wood as Foster, and John Seitz as Briggs.

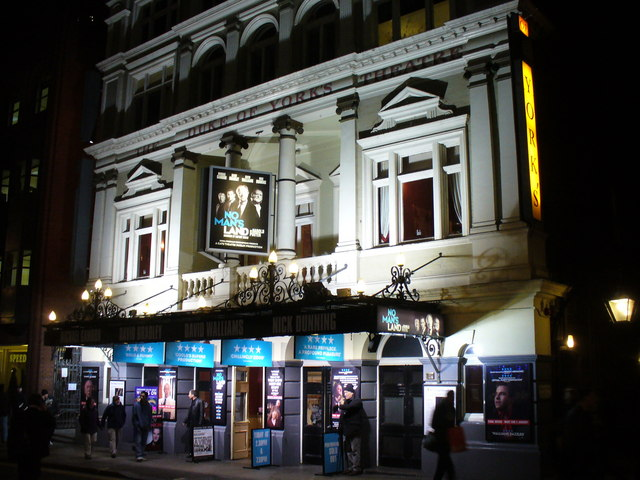
Marquee for No Man's Land, Duke of York's Theatre, London, 30 December 2008

In 2001, another major revival at the NT was directed by Harold Pinter, with Corin Redgrave as Hirst, John Wood as Spooner, Danny Dyer as Foster, and Andy de la Tour as Briggs.

In the summer of 2008, a production directed by Rupert Goold premièred at the Gate Theatre, in Dublin, with Michael Gambon (Hirst), David Bradley (Spooner), David Walliams (Foster), and Nick Dunning (Briggs). Goold's production transferred to the Duke of York's Theatre, in the West End, London, opening on 7 October 2008 and closing on 3 January 2009, the week after Pinter's death on 24 December 2008.

A production directed by Sean Mathias opened at Berkeley Rep in August 2013, with Ian McKellen, Patrick Stewart, Billy Crudup and Shuler Hensley. It opened on Broadway at the James Earl Jones Theatre (then called the Cort Theatre), in repertory with Waiting for Godot, on 24 November 2013 (previews began on 31 October 2013). It closed on 30 March 2014. It was restaged in the UK in 2016, with Owen Teale and Damien Molony replacing Hensley and Crudup. It played at the Sheffield Lyceum, Newcastle Theatre Royal, Brighton Theatre Royal and Cardiff New Theatre before transferring to Wyndham's Theatre in London's West End from September to December 2016.

The play was staged as the closing production of Steppenwolf Theatre Company's 2022-2023 season in Chicago, under the direction of Les Waters with theatre co-founder Jeff Perry (American actor) playing Hirst.

== Critical reception and interpretation ==
In reviewing the London première, on 24 April 1975, Michael Billington, of The Guardian, observes that the play is "about precisely what its title suggests":

the sense of being caught in some mysterious limbo between life and death, between a world of brute reality and one of fluid uncertainty. ... the play is a masterly summation of all the themes that have long obsessed Pinter: the fallibility of memory, the co-existence in one man of brute strength and sensitivity, the ultimate unknowability of women, the notion that all human contact is a battle between who and whom. ... It is in no sense a dry, mannerist work but a living, theatrical experience full of rich comedy in which one speech constantly undercuts another.

Over a decade after having written The Life and Work of Harold Pinter (1996), the first edition of his authorised biography of Pinter, Billington discusses his critical perspective on the play in his videotaped discussion for Pinter at the BBC, broadcast on BBC Four television from 26 October through 9 November 2002. After admitting that No Man's Land is a "haunting weird play" that he himself "can never fully understand – Who can? – but it works on you", he reviews the genesis of the play's first line ("As it is?"), which came to Pinter in a taxicab while riding home from dinner out alone, and the thematic significance of the titular metaphorical phrase no man's land, and finds "something of Pinter" in both of the main characters, each one a writer whom Pinter may have to some degree feared becoming: one "with all the trappings of success but [who] is inured by fame, wealth, comfort" (Hirst); the other, "the struggling, marginal, the pin-striped writer" who "does not make it" (Spooner); though when Billington put his theory to Pinter, Pinter said (jokingly), "Well, yes, maybe; but I've never had two man-servants named Foster and Briggs."

In reviewing Goold's revival of the play at the Duke of York's Theatre in 2008, Billington points out that "Hirst, a litterateur haunted by dreams and memories, is, as he tells Spooner, 'in the last lap of a race I had long forgotten to run'. But, while his servants conspire to lead Hirst to oblivion, Spooner attempts a chivalric rescue-act, dragging him towards the light of the living. The assumption is that his bid fails, as all four characters are finally marooned in a no-man's land 'which remains forever, icy and silent'."

In this play replete with echoes of T. S. Eliot, Spooner may appear to have failed in his apparent efforts to ingratiate himself with and perhaps even to "rescue" Hirst from "drowning" himself in drink. But Spooner still remains in the house at the end of the play, "in no man's land," along with Hirst (and Foster and Briggs), and the play ends in an impasse much like that of Pinter's 1960 play The Caretaker, to which critics compare No Man's Land.

As various other critics do, Michael Coveney is still asking: "Yes, but what does it all mean? Kenneth Tynan railed against the 'gratuitous obscurity' of Harold Pinter's poetic 1975 play when it was first produced by Peter Hall at the National starring John Gielgud as the supplicant versifier Spooner and Ralph Richardson as his host Hirst, patron and supporter of the arts. But the play is always gloriously enjoyable as an off-kilter vaudeville of friendship and dependency." In The Guardian, Billington concludes that "This is a compelling revival much aided by Neil Austin's lighting and Adam Cork's subliminal sound," observing: "when audience and cast finally joined in applauding Pinter, [who was] seated in a box, I felt it was in recognition of an eerily disturbing play that transports us into a world somewhere between reality and dream."

Both Billington and Paul Taylor (in The Independent) give the production 4 out of 5 stars, while Charles Spencer, reviewing the production in The Daily Telegraph, like other critics making inevitable comparisons with the original production, rates it as "equally fine, with Michael Gambon and David Bradley rising magnificently to the benchmark set by their illustrious predecessors," but points out that he too does not feel that he fully understands it: "Even after three decades I cannot claim fully to understand this haunting drama that proves by turns funny, scary, and resonantly poetic, but I have no doubt that it is one of the handful of indisputable modern classics that Pinter has written, and a piece that will haunt and tantalise the memory of all who see it."

In another feature on Goold's 2008 revival, following the responses of "three Pinter virgins" who did not understand or enjoy it ("Matilda Egere-Cooper, urban music journalist: 'Obscure and exhausting' "; "David Knott, political lobbyist: 'Don't expect to feel uplifted...' "; and "Susie Rushton, editor and columnist: 'Where's the joke?' "), the Independent's critic, Paul Taylor, reiterates his praise of No Man's Land, concluding:

Like many classic Pinter plays, "No Man's Land" is about the reaction to an intruder who threatens the status quo ante. The subtlety that gradually emerges in this play, though, is that Spooner, the seedy Prufrockian failed poet, is the alter ego of his host, the moneyed litterateur, Hirst, and that his predatory intrusion also represents an abortive attempt to reconnect Hirst to life and to his creativity and to save him from the bitter stalemate of old age. Mysterious, bleakly beautiful and very funny, No Man's Land demonstrates that though it may take a little while to latch on to the laws of Pinterland, it is well worth the effort.

What is less clear is the purpose of the play's undercurrent of homosexuality. In the opening scene there are repeated references to scopophilia and Spooner asks Hirst if he often hangs "around Hampstead Heath" and the pub Jack Straw's Castle, both notorious for homosexual activity in the 1960s and ‘70s. Most analysts have tended to ignore this subtext but it is there. With this and lines with double meaning like "You had a cottage?" as well as oblique but explicit references to baleful mothers, "quaint little perversions", women "especially in Siam or Bali", "Lord Lancer", a man called Bunty and male virginity, it seems likely that Pinter is playing a joke of some kind on more naive critics and admirers.
