= Lez Brotherston =

British set and costume designer

Leslie William Brotherston OBE (born 1961) is a British set and costume designer.

== Early life ==
He was born in Liverpool and attended Prescot Grammar School.

He trained at the Central School of Art and Design, graduating in theatre design in 1984.

== Career ==
He was a production designer of Letter to Brezhnev in the same year. He has worked in dance, theatre, opera, musicals and film, and has collaborated with Matthew Bourne. He won the Olivier Award for Cinderella and the Tony Award for Swan Lake.

National Life Stories conducted an oral history interview (C1173/10) with Lez Brotherston in 2006 for its An Oral History of Theatre Design collection held by the British Library.

Brotherston was appointed Officer of the Order of the British Empire (OBE) in the 2022 New Year Honours for services to dance and theatre.
