= List of major opera composers =

This list provides a guide to opera composers, as determined by their presence on a majority of compiled lists of significant opera composers. (See the "Lists Consulted" section for full details.) The composers run from Jacopo Peri, who wrote the first ever opera in late 16th century Italy, to John Adams, one of the leading figures in the contemporary operatic world. The brief accompanying notes offer an explanation as to why each composer has been considered major. Also included is a section about major women opera composers, compiled from the same lists. For an introduction to operatic history, see opera. The organisation of the list is by birthdate.

== Major opera composers ==
=== 1550–1699 ===
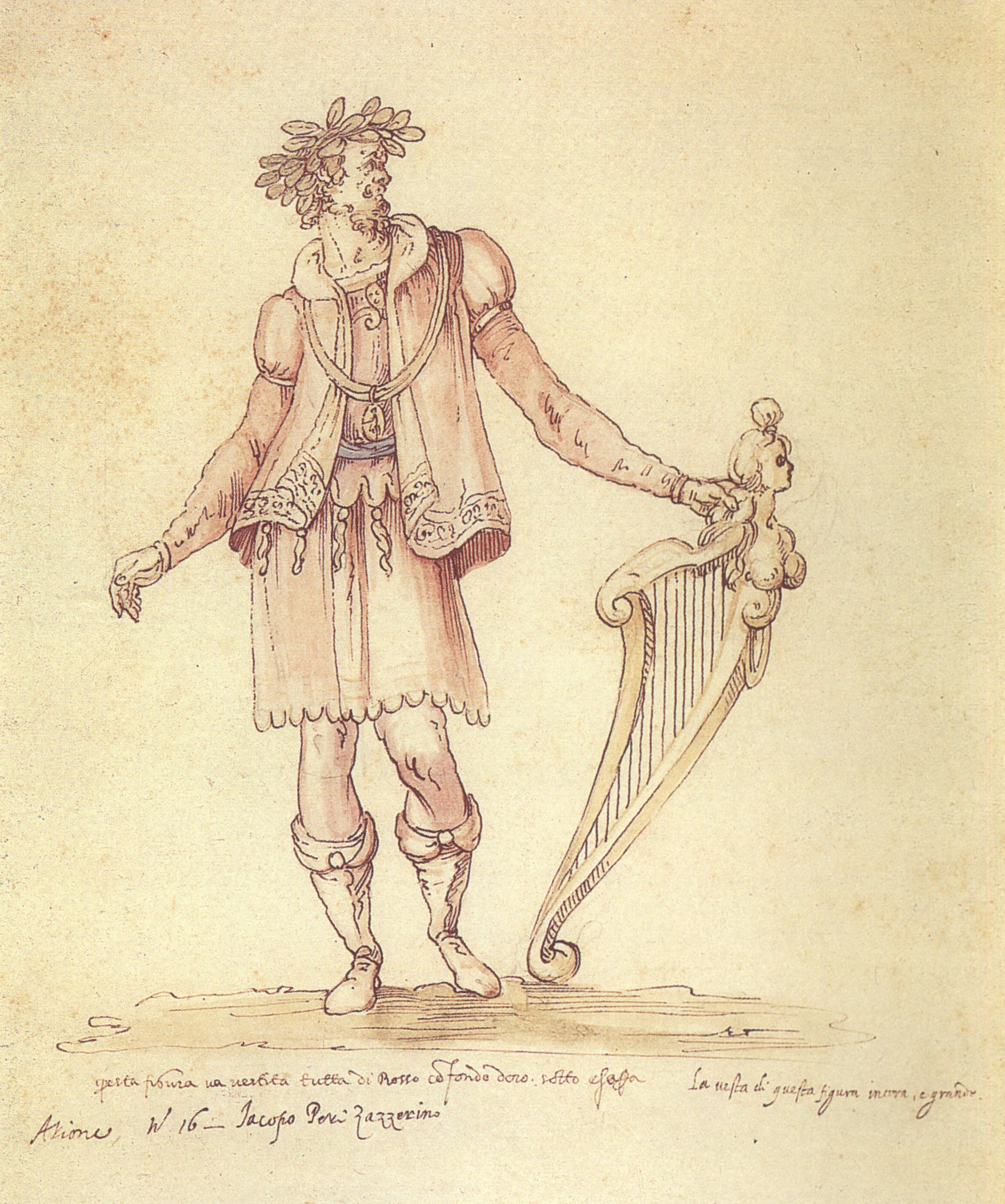
Jacopo Peri as Arion in La pellegrina

- Jacopo Peri (1561–1633) Florentine who composed both the first opera ever, Dafne (1598), and the first surviving opera, Euridice (1600).
- Claudio Monteverdi (1567–1643) Generally regarded as the first major opera composer. In Orfeo (1607) he blended Peri's experiments in opera with the lavish spectacle of the intermedi. Later, in Venice in the 1640s, he helped make opera a commercially viable form with Il ritorno d'Ulisse in patria and L'incoronazione di Poppea, one of the earliest operas in the present-day operatic repertoire.
- Francesco Cavalli (1602–1676) Amongst the most important of Monteverdi's successors, Cavalli was a major force in spreading opera throughout Italy and also helped introduce it to France. His Giasone was " the most popular opera of the 17th century".
- Jean-Baptiste Lully (1632–1687) In close collaboration with the librettist Philippe Quinault, Lully founded the tradition of tragédie en musique, combining singing, dance and visual spectacle, which would remain the most prestigious French operatic genre for almost a hundred years. Cadmus et Hermione (1673) is often regarded as the first example of French opera.
- Henry Purcell (1659–1695) First English operatic composer of significance. His masterwork is Dido and Aeneas.
- Alessandro Scarlatti (1660–1725) Key figure in the development of opera seria, Scarlatti claimed to have composed over 100 operas, of which La Griselda is a notable example.
- Johann Christoph Pepusch (1667–1752) Arranger of the first English ballad opera, the biting political satire, The Beggar's Opera.
- Jean-Philippe Rameau (1683–1764) Most important French opera composer of the 18th century. Following in the genre established by Lully, he endowed his works with a great richness of invention. Rameau's musical daring provoked great controversy in his day, but he was an important influence on Gluck.
- George Frideric Handel (1685–1759) Handel's opera serie set the standard in his day. Handel composed a series of over 40 operas.

=== 1700–1799 ===
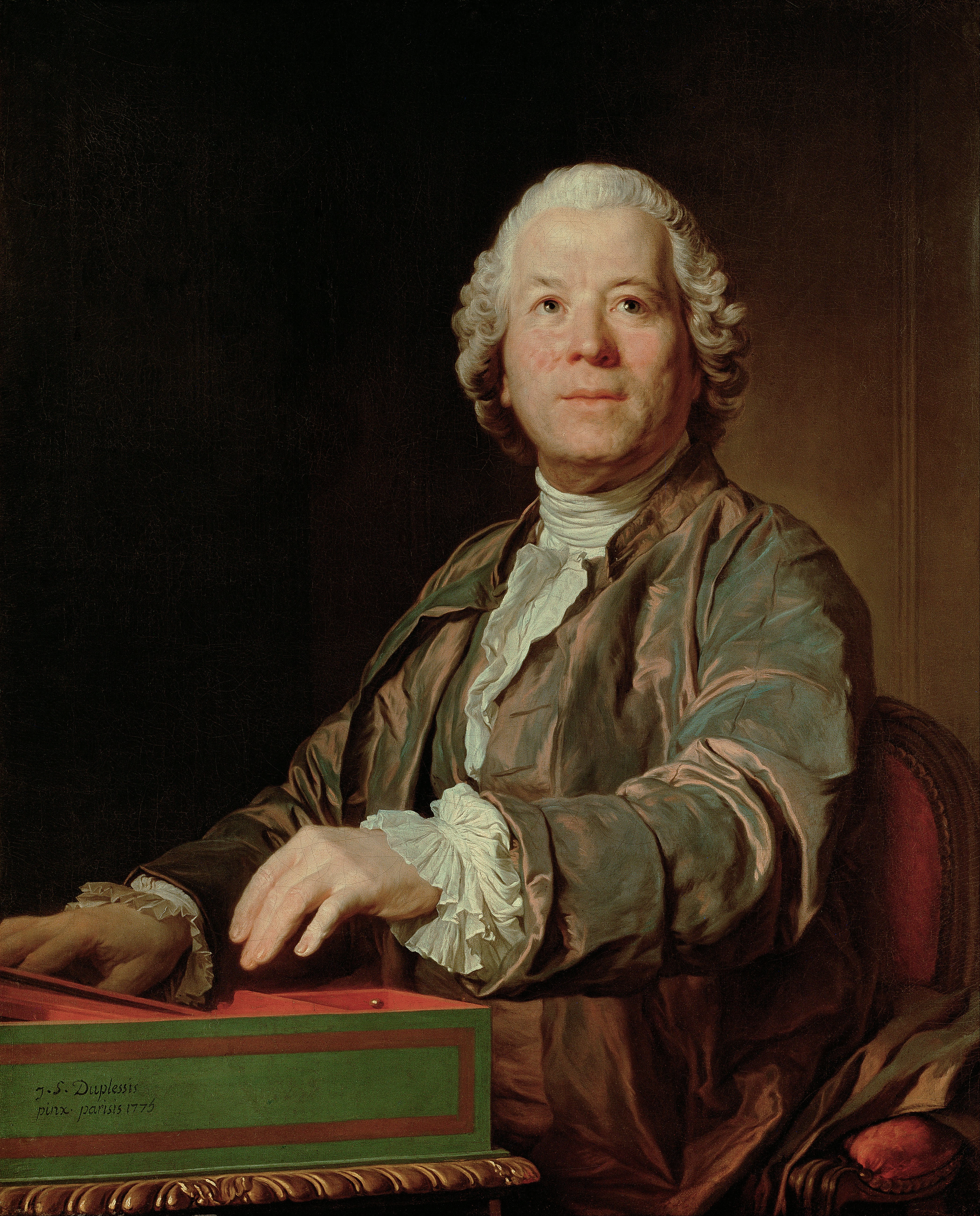
Gluck in a 1775 portrait by Joseph Duplessis.

- Giovanni Battista Pergolesi (1710–1736) Though Pergolesi also composed opera serias, his most influential work was the short opera buffa, La serva padrona.
- Christoph Willibald Gluck (1714–1787) Was a key figure in the transformation of Baroque into Classical opera, paving the way for Mozart, though his influence stretched much further into the 19th century, with both Berlioz and Wagner acknowledging their debt to him. In his reform operas from Orfeo ed Euridice onwards, he sought to throw off the formal conventions of opera seria and write music of "beautiful simplicity" (his own words).
- Joseph Haydn (1732–1809) Haydn wrote nineteen operas including several comic operas and singspiels.
- Giovanni Paisiello (1740–1816) Italian composer who wrote the first opera to include Beaumarchais' character Figaro as a main character, as well as writing a substantial number of other operas, some of them in St. Petersburg.
- André Grétry (1741–1813) Liège (present-day Belgium) composer crucial to the development of French opéra comique, whose simplicity of musical style and sophisticated dramaturgy were immensely popular, as well as linking pre-revolutionary rococo comedy to the later romantic style.
- Domenico Cimarosa (1749–1801) Italian composer most famous for the opera buffa, Il matrimonio segreto, which forms a bridge between the comedies of Mozart and Rossini.
- Antonio Salieri (1750–1825) Italian composer who was a major contributor to and shaper of Viennese musical life from 1770 to 1820, he also composed successful operas in Italy and Paris, and won admiration from German operagoers as a composer who, in the words of one contemporary critic, ‘could bind all the power of German music to the sweet Italian style’. His opera Europa riconosciuta was composed for the inauguration of La Scala. Among his other most successful operas were Les Danaïdes, Axur, re d'Ormus (the Italian version of French Tarare) and Falstaff.
- Wolfgang Amadeus Mozart (1756–1791) Mozart's series of comic collaborations (The Marriage of Figaro, Don Giovanni, and Così fan tutte) with Lorenzo Da Ponte are among the most popular operas in the repertoire today, along with his Singspiel The Magic Flute.
- Luigi Cherubini (1760–1842) Follower of Gluck, Cherubini's most famous opera is Médée. The title role has proved a challenge to sopranos (including Maria Callas) since its premiere in 1797.
- Ludwig van Beethoven (1770–1827) Wrote only one opera, Fidelio, a tale of freedom from political oppression, which has become one of the major German-language operas.
- Gaspare Spontini (1774–1851) Though Italian, Spontini is best known for his work in France during the Napoleonic era. His masterpiece La vestale influenced Bellini and Berlioz.
- Daniel Auber (1782–1871) French composer celebrated for high-spirited opéra comiques such as Fra Diavolo and Le domino noir. His grand opera La muette de Portici attained unexpected political influence when a performance in Brussels in 1830 sparked off a revolution which led to the creation of Belgium.
- Carl Maria von Weber (1786–1826) Founded German Romantic opera in order to challenge the dominance of Italian bel canto. Master of orchestral colour and atmosphere, Weber was never well served by his librettists, and only one of his works, Der Freischütz, is performed with any frequency. Though he died young, his influence on later German composers, especially Wagner, was immense.
- Giacomo Meyerbeer (1791–1864) The archetypal composer of French grand opera, Meyerbeer's huge extravaganzas such as Les Huguenots and Le prophète were immensely popular in their day.
- Gioachino Rossini (1792–1868) Links bel canto with grand opera. His immortal Barber of Seville was the only one of his operas that was continuously performed into the 20th century, but his serious operas, such as Semiramide and Ermione, are recognised as masterpieces now that singers with appropriate technique are again available to perform them. Guillaume Tell, his swan-song, has a vast sweep only equalled in the 19th century by the later works of Verdi, Mussorgsky and Wagner.
- Heinrich Marschner (1795–1861) German composer who was the most important exponent of German Romantic opera in the generation between Weber and Wagner. His most successful operas were Hans Heiling, Der Vampyr and Der Templer und die Jüdin.
- Gaetano Donizetti (1797–1848) Along with Rossini and Bellini, Donizetti is generally acknowledged as one of the masters of the bel canto style. His masterwork is generally cited as being Lucia di Lammermoor.
- Fromental Halévy (1799–1862) Along with Meyerbeer, the best known composer of French grand opera, Halévy's key work is La Juive, a story of religious intolerance set in 15th century Switzerland.

=== 1800–1849 ===
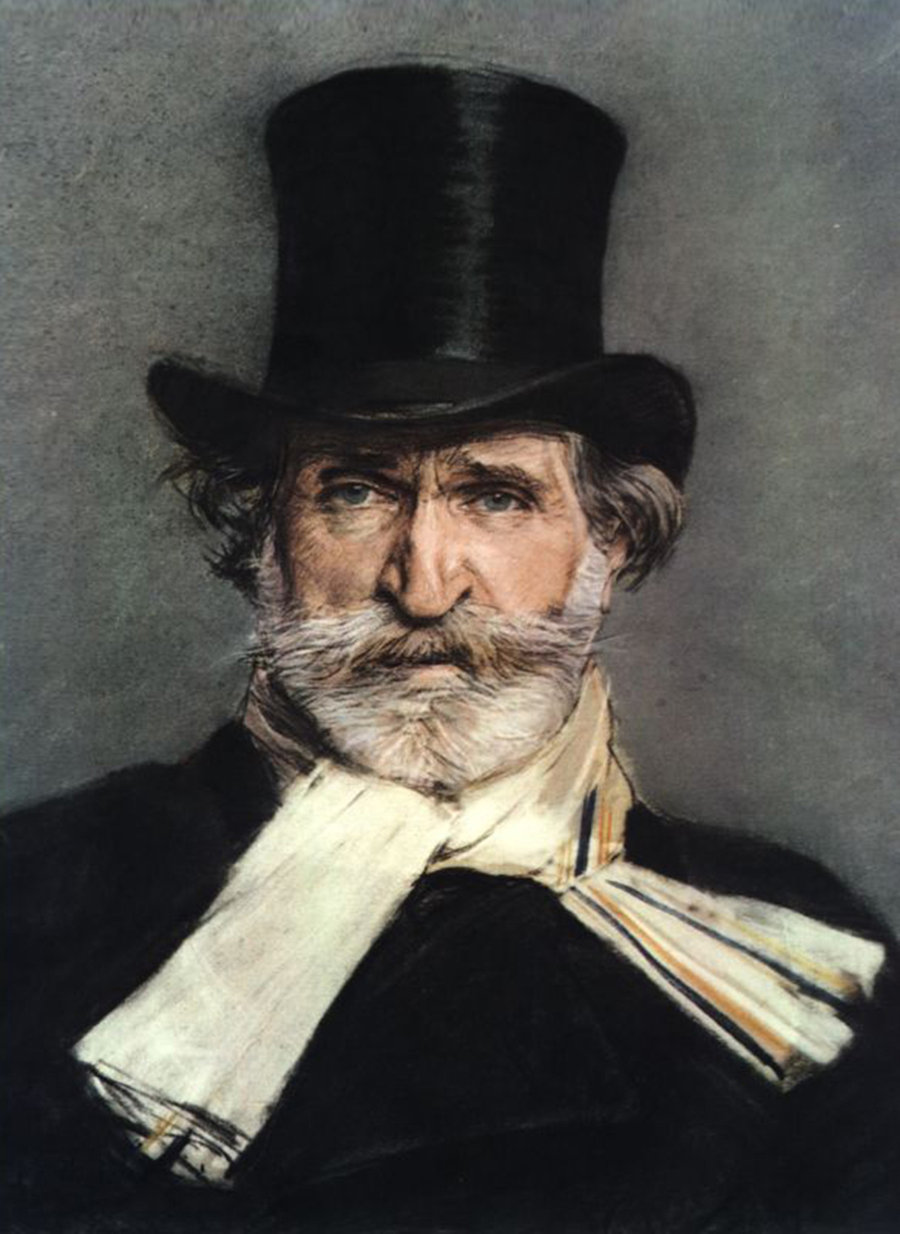
Giuseppe Verdi, by Giovanni Boldini, 1886 (National Gallery of Modern Art, Rome)

- Vincenzo Bellini (1801–1835) On account of such works as Norma and I puritani, Bellini is recognised as one of the leading composers of the bel canto style of opera.
- Hector Berlioz (1803–1869) Berlioz's attempts to carve out an operatic career for himself were thwarted by an unimaginative musical establishment. Nevertheless, he managed to produce Benvenuto Cellini, Béatrice et Bénédict and his masterpiece, the epic Les Troyens,. Berlioz's dramatic legend, La damnation de Faust, has also been staged as an opera in recent years.
- Mikhail Glinka (1804–1857) Founded the Russian operatic tradition with his historical drama A Life for the Tsar and his fairy tale piece Ruslan and Lyudmila.
- Michael William Balfe (1808–1870) Irish composer, his opera The Bohemian Girl is notable for its Arline's aria Gipsy Girl's Dream.
- Ambroise Thomas (1811–1896) French composer noted for the operas Mignon and Hamlet.
- George Alexander Macfarren (1813–1887) English composer noted for the operas Robin Hood and Helvellyn.
- Richard Wagner (1813–1883) Wagner revolutionised opera. In a series of "music dramas" such as Tristan und Isolde, Parsifal, and most of all his epic tetralogy Der Ring des Nibelungen, Wagner abolished the traditional distinction between recitative and aria and pioneered a new through-composed style of opera.
- Giuseppe Verdi (1813–1901) Had a long composing career, during which his compositional style kept evolving. Among his most famous works are Nabucco, Rigoletto, Il Trovatore, La traviata, Don Carlos, Aida, and Otello.
- Charles Gounod (1818–1893) Wrote lyrical operas on literary themes, including Roméo et Juliette and Mireille. His Faust still holds the stage today, in spite of criticisms of its "Victorianism".

Faust: "O merveille! ... A moi les plaisirs"
Charles Gounod's Faust: Méphistophélès (Marcel Journet) gives Faust (Enrico Caruso) a glimpse of Marguerite, and he signs the contract with the Devil, then leaves with him to experience the world. Recorded in 1910.

- Jacques Offenbach (1819–1880) Founder of French operetta and a prolific composer of pieces which achieved tremendous success with Parisian audiences for their catchy melodies and satirical bite such as La Vie parisienne and Orpheus in the Underworld. At the time of his death, Offenbach was working on a more serious opera, The Tales of Hoffmann.
- Bedřich Smetana (1824–1884) Established Czech national opera with such historical epics as Dalibor. His folk comedy The Bartered Bride has entered the international repertory.
- Alexander Borodin (1833–1887) A "weekend composer" who spent 17 years working on a single opera, Prince Igor, which now forms a key part of the Russian repertory.
- Camille Saint-Saëns (1835–1921). French composer of around a dozen operas of which one, the Biblical Samson et Delila, is still performed.
- Léo Delibes (1836–1891) French composer, whose Lakmé is notable for its Flower Duet and as a vehicle for coloratura sopranos.
- Carlos Gomes (1836–1896) Brazil's leading 19th-century opera composer, Gomes made his international reputation in Italy with Il Guarany (1870), premiered at La Scala. His operas brought Brazilian literary and historical subjects into the Italian operatic world, especially in Il Guarany and Lo schiavo, while works such as Fosca, Salvator Rosa and Maria Tudor placed him within the European theatre culture of his day. UNESCO describes him as the most important Latin American opera composer of the later 19th century.
- Georges Bizet (1838–1875) Bizet's masterwork Carmen is a staple of the repertoire of opera houses the world over. At the time of its premiere, the controversial plot scandalised both critics and the public.
- Modest Mussorgsky (1839–1881) Mussorgsky completed only one opera, but Boris Godunov proved to be inspiration for generations of Russian composers on account of its uniquely nationalist character.
- Pyotr Ilyich Tchaikovsky (1840–1893) Tchaikovsky's international fame as an opera composer mainly rests on two works, Eugene Onegin and The Queen of Spades. Less interested in cultivating a uniquely Russian style than his contemporary Mussorgsky, Tchaikovsky also shows the influence of Mozart, bel canto and Bizet's Carmen in these pieces.
- Emmanuel Chabrier (1841–1894) Had ambitions to write grand operas in the Wagnerian vein, but is now most celebrated for lighter pieces, such as L'étoile and Le roi malgré lui, which were greatly admired by Ravel and Poulenc.
- Antonín Dvořák (1841–1904) Leading Czech opera composer between Smetana and Janáček. His Rusalka, based on the Undine legend, is his most popular work internationally.
- Jules Massenet (1842–1912) Arguably the most representative French opera composer of his era (the Belle Époque), Massenet was a prolific and versatile writer whose works cover a wide variety of themes. His popularity faded somewhat after the First World War, but Werther and Manon still make regular appearances in the opera house.
- Arthur Sullivan (1842–1900) English composer who is best known for his series of 14 operatic collaborations with the dramatist W. S. Gilbert, including such enduring works as H.M.S. Pinafore, The Pirates of Penzance and The Mikado.
- Nikolai Rimsky-Korsakov (1844–1908) Russian composer who wrote colourful operas on legendary and historical subjects.

=== 1850–1899 ===
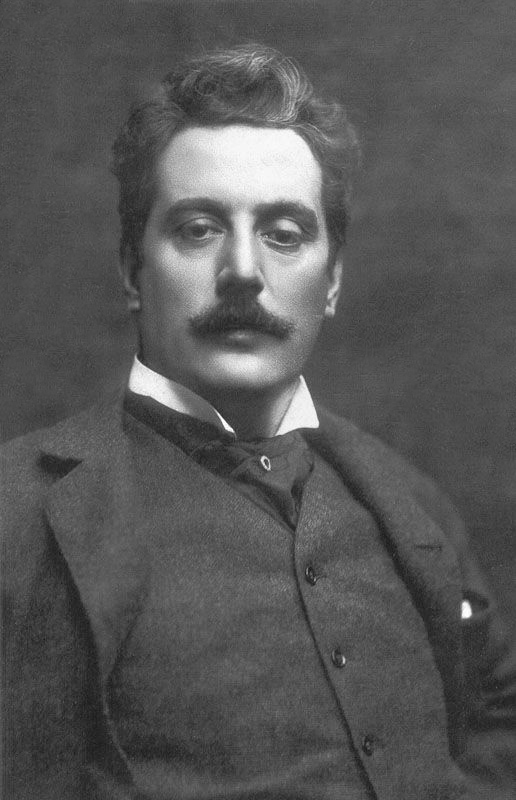
Giacomo Puccini

- Leoš Janáček (1854–1928) Janáček's first mature opera (Jenůfa) blended folksong-like melodies and an emphasis on natural speech-rhythms à la Mussorgsky with a character-driven plot of some intensity; his later works became increasingly terse, with recurrent melodic fragments, lyrical outbursts and unconventional orchestration serving a diverse collection of source-material – just a few bars of these operas can instantly be identified as his.
- Ruggero Leoncavallo (1857–1919) Italian composer associated with verismo. His Pagliacci is a staple of the operatic repertoire and is usually given alongside Mascagni's Cavalleria rusticana.
- Giacomo Puccini (1858–1924) The only true successor to Giuseppe Verdi in Italian opera, Puccini's Tosca, La bohème and Madama Butterfly are among the most popular and well-recognised in the repertoire today.
- Gustave Charpentier (1860–1956) French composer famous for a single opera, Louise, set in a working class district of Paris.
- Claude Debussy (1862–1918) Like Beethoven, Debussy finished only one opera, but his setting of Maeterlinck's Symbolist play Pelléas et Mélisande is a key work in 20th century music drama. In many ways an "anti-opera", Pelléas contained little of the conventional singing or action audiences at the première had come to expect, but Debussy used his subtle orchestration to create an elusive, dream-like atmosphere, which still has the power to fascinate listeners today.
- Pietro Mascagni (1863–1945) Italian composer, famous above all for Cavalleria rusticana, usually given in a double-bill with Leoncavallo's Pagliacci.
- Richard Strauss (1864–1949) Strauss was one of very few opera composers in the early years of the 20th century to accept and conquer the challenge laid down by the scale and radical nature of Wagner's innovative works. He composed several operas that remain extremely popular today, including Salome, Elektra, and Der Rosenkavalier.
- Scott Joplin (1868–1917) Black American composer known for his operas, A Guest of Honor and Treemonisha.
- Hans Pfitzner (1869–1949) A follower of Wagner, Pfitzner is best known for the opera Palestrina which explores the debate between tradition and innovation in music.
- Arnold Schoenberg (1874–1951) A leading Modernist composer and the deviser of the twelve-tone system, Schoenberg began his operatic career with the Expressionist monodrama Erwartung. His major opera Moses und Aron was left unfinished at his death.
- Maurice Ravel (1875–1937) Wrote two short, but innovative, operas: L'enfant et les sortilèges, set in the world of childhood, and the Spanish-flavoured L'heure espagnole.
- Franz Schreker (1878–1934) Austrian composer associated with Expressionism, Schreker once rivalled Richard Strauss in popularity but, as a Jew, he fell foul of the Nazis. His operas include Der ferne Klang and Die Gezeichneten.
- Béla Bartók (1881–1945) Wrote only one opera, Duke Bluebeard's Castle, a key piece in 20th century music theatre and the only Hungarian work with a secure place in the international operatic repertoire.
- Igor Stravinsky (1882–1971) After composing the Rimsky-Korsakov-inspired The Nightingale and the near-operas Renard and The Soldier's Tale, Stravinsky bucked 20th century trends by composing a "number" opera, The Rake's Progress, using diatonicism.
- Alban Berg (1885–1935) Because of their atonal music which uses tonal conventions harkening back to late romanticism and tragic libretti, Berg's masterworks Wozzeck and Lulu have stayed in the repertory and assumed increased popularity after his death.
- Sergei Prokofiev (1891–1953) Major modern composer in the Russian tradition, Prokofiev produced operas on a wide variety of subjects, from the comic fairy-tale The Love for Three Oranges, to the dark and occult The Fiery Angel and the epic War and Peace. Like Shostakovich, Prokofiev suffered under the Soviet artistic regime, but his work has recently been championed by conductors such as Valery Gergiev.
- Paul Hindemith (1895–1963) German composer who came to prominence in the years following World War I. His key opera, Mathis der Maler, dealing with the problems of an artist in a time of crisis, has been seen as an allegory of Hindemith's situation during the Third Reich.
- George Gershwin (1898–1937) Owes his place in the standard operatic repertoire to Porgy and Bess.
- Francis Poulenc (1899–1963) French composer who composed both Dialogues des Carmélites and La voix humaine.

=== 1900–present ===
- William Walton (1902–1983) Walton's major opera is Troilus and Cressida.
- Michael Tippett (1905–1998) Probably the most famous British composer to follow in the wake of Benjamin Britten, Tippett wrote operas exploring metaphysical and social themes. They include The Midsummer Marriage and The Knot Garden.
- Dmitri Shostakovich (1906–1975) Shostakovich's most famous opera, Lady Macbeth of the Mtsensk District, a violent love story set in provincial Russia, scandalised Soviet authorities. He later produced a revised version, Katerina Ismailova. Nevertheless, the original became one of the most performed operatic works of the 20th century.
- Samuel Barber (1910–1981) American who composed two major operas, Vanessa and Antony and Cleopatra.
- Gian Carlo Menotti (1911–2007) Italian American composer, particularly famous for the Christmas piece Amahl and the Night Visitors, the first opera to be written specifically for television.
- Benjamin Britten (1913–1976) One of the handful of British opera composers to reach international acclaim, and one of the extremely few composers of 20th century operas that stayed in the standard repertory after their premieres. These operas include his masterworks Peter Grimes, A Midsummer Night's Dream, and The Turn of the Screw.
- Carlisle Floyd (1926–2021) Owes his place in the operatic repertoire to his opera Susannah, also known for Wuthering Heights and Of Mice and Men.
- Hans Werner Henze (1926–2012) One of the most widely performed post-World War II opera composers, Henze's works include The Bassarids and Elegy for Young Lovers.
- Harrison Birtwistle (1934–2022) British contemporary composer known for The Mask of Orpheus, Gawain, and The Minotaur.
- Peter Maxwell Davies (1934–2016) A British modernist of the "Manchester school", Davies wrote many stage works, including Taverner and The Martyrdom of St Magnus.
- Philip Glass (born 1937) A leading American composer of the minimalist school, Glass first came to fame with the opera Einstein on the Beach, a collaboration with the theatre director Robert Wilson. Many stage works (including Akhnaten and The Voyage) followed.
- John Adams (born 1947) Like Glass, Adams started as a minimalist. His operas deal with contemporary subjects; Nixon in China and The Death of Klinghoffer, have gained critical acclaim and provoked political controversy.
- Anthony Davis (born 1951) Black American composer known for incorporating jazz and gospel music into his operas, which include X, The Life and Times of Malcolm X, Wakonda's Dream, and The Central Park Five.
- Kaija Saariaho (1952–2023) Finnish composer of L'Amour de loin, Adriana Mater, and Innocence.
- Oscar Edelstein (born 1953) Argentinean composer known for many operas including Eterna Flotación-Los monstruito with the libretto adapted by Edelstein from poems of Rodolfo Enrique Fogwill for C.E.T.C., the experimental wing of Teatro Colón.
- Ricky Ian Gordon (born 1956) American composer known for The Grapes of Wrath, Morning Star, and The Garden of the Finzi-Continis.
- Miguel del Águila (born 1957) His operas deal with historical and contemporary topics; these include Time and Again Barelas, which was commissioned by Albuquerque's tricentennial, Cuauhtemoc and Composer Missing.
- Osvaldo Golijov (born 1960) Argentine composer known for his work Ainadamar.
- Mark-Anthony Turnage (born 1960) British contemporary composer of The Silver Tassie, Anna Nicole, and Coraline.
- Jake Heggie (born 1961) American composer known for Dead Man Walking, Moby-Dick, and his operatic adaptation of It's a Wonderful Life.
- Terence Blanchard (born 1962) Black American composer of Champion and Fire Shut Up in My Bones.
- Thomas Adès (born 1971) British composer known for Powder Her Face, The Tempest and The Exterminating Angel.
- Kevin Puts (born 1972) Best known for his operas The Hours and Silent Night.
- Huang Ruo (born 1976) Chinese composer known for his operas Dr. Sun Yat-sen, An American Soldier, and The Monkey King.
- Mason Bates (born 1977) American composer known for using electronic music in his operas, which include The (R)evolution of Steve Jobs and The Amazing Adventures of Kavalier and Clay, based on the novel of the same name by Michael Chabon.
- Matthew Aucoin (born 1990) Best known for Eurydice.

== Female opera composers ==
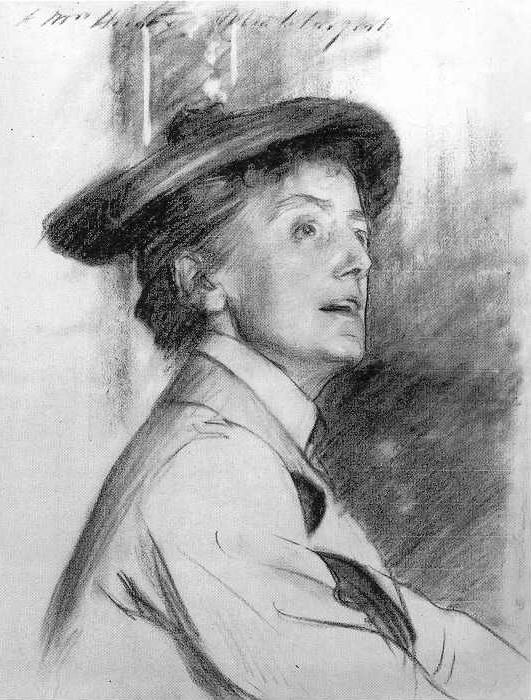
Drawing of Ethel Smith by John Singer Sargent, 1901

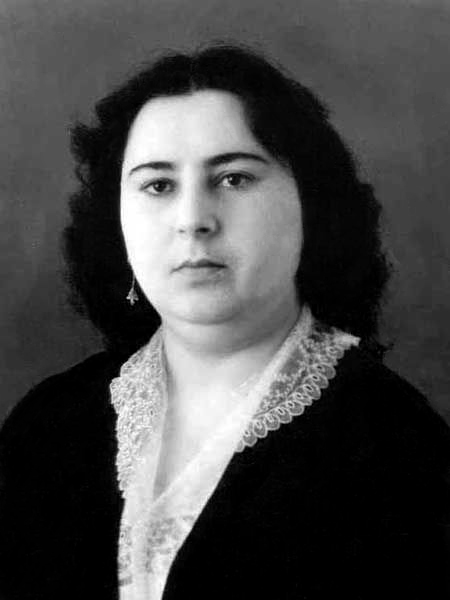
Shafiga Akhundova

A number of reasons, including the high cost of production and high status of opera, have been suggested to explain the relatively few women who have been composers of opera, and no female composer met the criteria for inclusion above. However, some experts in our sample disagreed, and named one or more of the women below as comparable to those already listed:

- Francesca Caccini (18 September 1587 – after 1641) Italian composer, singer, lutenist, poet, and music teacher of the early Baroque era. She was also known by the nickname "La Cecchina", given to her by the Florentines and probably a diminutive of "Francesca". She was the daughter of Giulio Caccini. Her only surviving stage work, La liberazione di Ruggiero, is widely considered the oldest opera by a female composer.
- Dame Ethel Smyth (1858–1944) Perhaps most famous for her work for the suffragettes; however, she also wrote several operas of note, including The Wreckers.
- Shafiga Akhundova (21 January 1924 – 26 July 2013) was a prominent Azerbaijani composer, the first professional female author of an opera in the East. She is also The People's Artist of Azerbaijan.
- Kaija Saariaho (1952–2023) Finnish composer of L'Amour de loin, Adriana Mater, and Innocence.
- Judith Weir (born 1954) British composer known for the 1987 opera A Night at the Chinese Opera.
- Jeanine Tesori (born 1961) Tony-winning composer best known for her work on the Broadway stage, but has also composed Blue and Grounded.
- Gabriela Lena Frank (born 1972) American composer, known for her acclaimed opera El Último Sueño de Frida y Diego.
- Svitlana Azarova (born 1976) Commissioned by the Royal Danish Opera to write Momo and the Time Thieves, which premiered in 2017.
- Missy Mazzoli (born 1980) One of the first two women to receive a commission from the Metropolitan Opera; her operas Proving Up, Breaking the Waves, and The Listeners have been performed worldwide.

Other notable women opera composers include Peggy Glanville-Hicks, Adriana Hölszky, Lori Laitman, Rachel Portman, Olga Neuwirth and Thea Musgrave.

== See also ==
- Category:Opera composers
- Category:Operas by composer
- List of operas by composer
- List of important operas
- List of Orphean operas
