= The Silver Tassie =

The Silver Tassie may refer to:

- The Silver Tassie (play), 1928 play by Sean O'Casey
- The Silver Tassie (opera), 1999 opera adaptation of the above play, by Mark Anthony Turnage
