= Blood on the Floor (Turnage) =

Orchestral work by Mark-Anthony Turnage

- Orchestral suite by Mark-Anthony Turnage
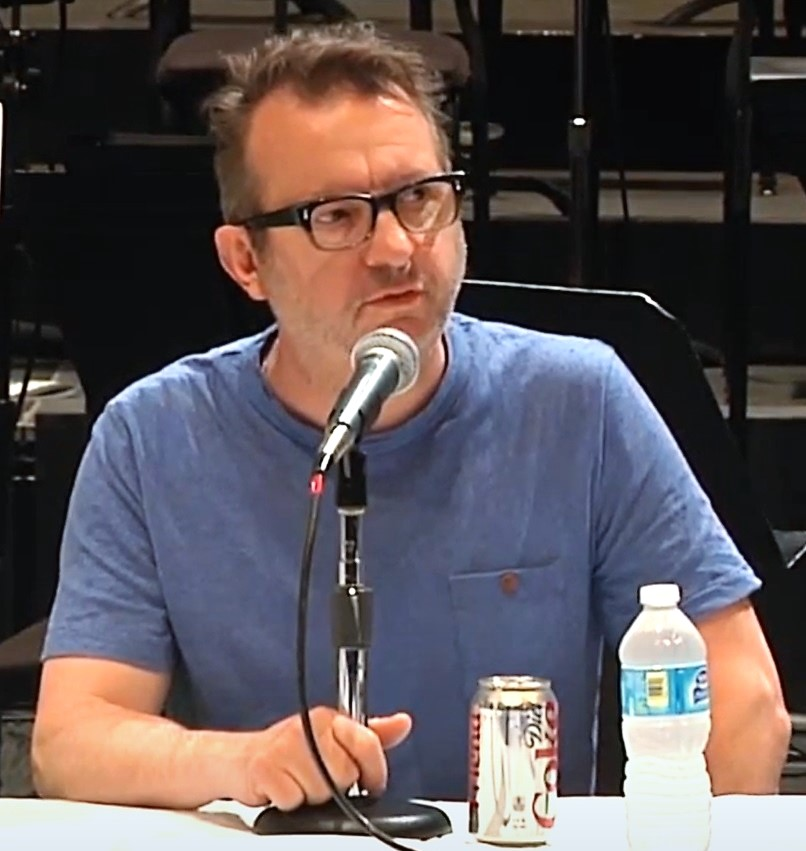
- Turnage in 2014 at the Cabrillo Festival of Contemporary Music
- Genre: Third stream
- Related: Dispelling the Fears; Your Rockaby
- Commissioned by: Ensemble Modern
- Composed: 1993–1996
- Dedication: Heather Betts; Brett Dean; Andrew Turnage
- Duration: 70–80 minutes
- Movements: Nine

Premiere
- Date: May 1996
- Location: Queen Elizabeth Hall, London, United Kingdom
- Performers: Ensemble Modern, with John Scofield, Martin Robertson and Peter Erskine

Blood on the Floor is a suite in nine movements composed for orchestra and jazz trio by Mark-Anthony Turnage. It was composed over a span of three years (1993–1996) after a commission from the Ensemble Modern—a German music group—to produce a piece for an evening jazz event in 1994. After the performance, Turnage expanded the piece into a larger nine-movement suite. During this period of composition, Turnage's brother Andrew died of a drug overdose, shaping the music greatly. As a result, drug culture is one of the main themes in the suite. Blood on the Floor also draws influences from the paintings of Francis Bacon and Heather Betts; the suite's title is an adaptation of Bacon's painting Blood on Pavement.

Like other compositions by Turnage, Blood on the Floor incorporates elements of both classical and jazz music. Due to this, it has been described as being part of the "third stream" genre, a term coined by Turnage's former teacher Gunther Schuller. The suite is written as a concerto grosso and features a blend of classical, jazz, non-western and electronic instruments. As part of this fusion, the suite contains space for soloists to improvise in four of its movements. Blood on the Floor shows elements of non-functional harmony and has complex rhythmic changes, often changing metre every bar. Motifs are found recurring throughout the suite.

The premiere performance of Blood on the Floor was by the Ensemble Modern at the Queen Elizabeth Hall, London, in May 1996. The suite received a mixed reception from music critics. Some enjoyed the suite's fusion of classical and jazz music, while others found it to be an unfulfilling combination. Outside of the Ensemble Modern, Blood on the Floor has been performed by various ensembles, including the Berlin Philharmonic, Melbourne Symphony Orchestra and Boston Symphony Orchestra.

== Composition ==
Blood on the Floor was composed by the British composer Mark-Anthony Turnage between 1993 and 1996. During his compositional process, Turnage used sketches he had produced during a period of collaboration with the saxophonist Martin Robertson. These sketches were used to create the prologue of the suite.

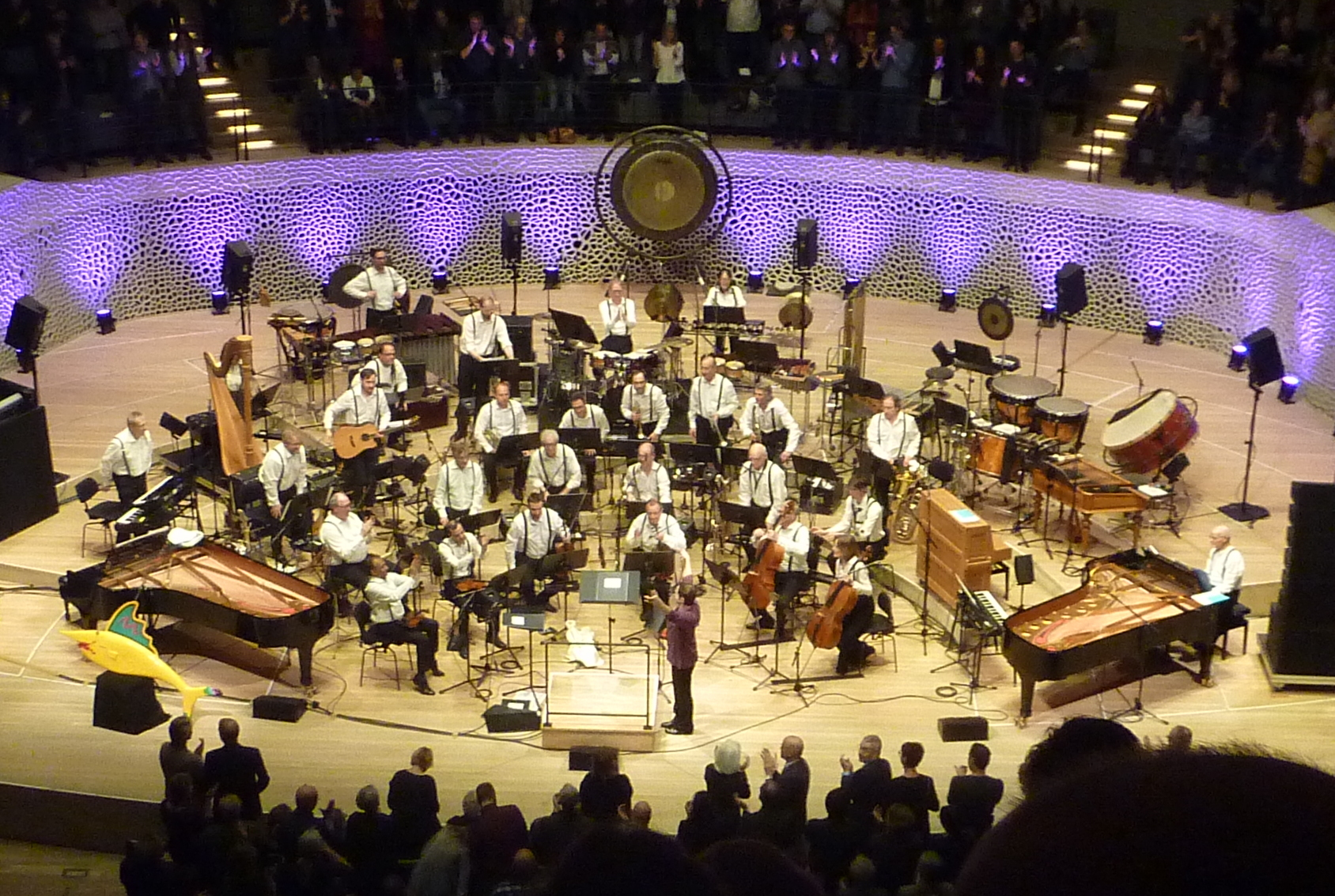
Blood on the Floor was commissioned by the Ensemble Modern.

The piece was commissioned in 1993 by the Ensemble Modern—a German group dedicated to contemporary classical music—for an evening jazz event with pieces by George Gershwin, Leonard Bernstein and George Antheil. The version Turnage produced for the event was ten minutes long and was performed in 1994. After the event, Turnage expanded the piece into a nine movement suite; the final composition ended up being a little more than an hour long. This was largely due to persuasion from the Ensemble Modern, who have a history of working on larger musical projects. During the composition of Blood on the Floor, Turnage consulted Robertson, John Scofield and Peter Erskine, who would be playing in the jazz trio with the Ensemble Modern. Erskine objected to the level of notation in the drum kit part for the suite, leading Turnage to have a "culture shock" after restricting his score to its essential elements to allow Erskine more freedom.

Blood on the Floor takes inspiration from the paintings of Francis Bacon as with Turnage's previous works, like Three Screaming Popes. The suite's name is an adaptation of Bacon's painting, Blood on Pavement. Other works by Bacon, as well a painting by the Australian artist Heather Betts, influence elements of the suite. Blood on the Floor reflects Turnage's personal feelings on the death of his brother Andrew, who died of a drug overdose during its composition. As a consequence, drug culture is an overarching theme in the suite. Due to this, the music in Blood on the Floor is often quite harsh, with Turnage commenting that it was "probably the nastiest thing I have written".

== Instrumentation ==
Blood on the Floor is written as a concerto grosso, a form of concerto played by a group of soloists. The concertino consists of a jazz trio of electric guitar, soprano saxophone (doubling alto saxophone and bass clarinet) and drum kit. For the suite's orchestration, Turnage uses a mixture of orchestral and non-orchestral instruments, including instruments usually associated with jazz, as well as unusual instruments like synthesisers and scaffolding. (Note: Before working with the Ensemble Modern for Blood on the Floor, Turnage had collaborated with mixed ensembles during his work with Michael Gibbs's Creative Jazz Orchestra.) The score calls for a large ripieno consisting of the following instruments:

Woodwinds

2 flutes (doubling alto flute and scaffolding)
2 oboes (doubling cor anglais)
2 clarinets in B♭ (doubling bass clarinet, first doubling scaffolding)
2 soprano saxophones (doubling alto saxophone)
2 bassoons (doubling contrabassoon)

Brass

2 horns in F
2 trumpets in C
2 trombones
euphonium
tuba

Percussion (two players)

2 bass drums
2 bongo drums
tabla
bodhran
splash cymbal
piece of wood (hit with hammer)
tambourines
sleigh bells
tam-tam
4 gongs (assorted sizes, one played with bow)

bonshō (temple bells)
cowbells
log drum
marimba
vibraphone
glockenspiel
crotales (sometimes played with bow)
tubular bells
bell plates
maracas
claves
lion's roar
djembe
saucepan
piano (doubling celesta and Fender Rhodes electric piano/Yamaha DX7)

Strings

2 violin Is
2 violin IIs
2 violas
2 cellos
double bass
electric guitar
bass guitar (doubling fretless bass and double bass)

== Structure and music ==
=== Character ===
Decca Recording of Blood on the Floor
- Recordings via YouTube
- I: Prologue: "Blood on the Floor"
- II: "Junior Addict"
- III: "Shout"
- IV: "Sweet and Decay"
- V: "Needles"
- VI: "Elegy for Andy"
- VII: "Cut Up"
- VIII: "Crackdown"
- IX: "Dispelling the Fears"

Blood on the Floor has been described as a "third stream" piece: a fusion of classical and jazz styles. (Note: Turnage was a student of Gunther Schuller—the musician who coined the term "third stream"—when he attended Tanglewood.) The suite uses jazz chords as its harmonic basis and displays aspects of non-functional harmony. Blood on the Floor is neither tonal nor atonal: some passages feature tonal ideas, but there is never a single key that represents a movement. Turnage contrasts thematic ideas with no transitions in between them, creating juxtapositions. Driving rhythms are found in many sections of the suite. Complex metres are used, and metre changes occur in almost every bar.

In terms of notation, the concertino parts include a mixture of notated music and space for improvisation. Improvisation forms a major part of Blood on the Floor and appears in four movements (II, V, VI and VIII). Although his works combine classical and jazz music—of which improvisation is a key part—this was the first time that Turnage integrated improvisation into one of his compositions.

=== Motifs ===
Turnage employs musical motifs heavily throughout Blood on the Floor. In his 2008 Doctor of Musical Arts thesis, Matthew Styles identifies a total of eight motifs employed that appear in the prologue and reappear throughout the other eight movements. Styles argues that this use of motifs adds musical unity to the suite and fulfils "the idea of a prologue": to introduce themes found later in the suite. One motif used is a recurring glissando played by the brass and low woodwind, which appears in the first, fifth and seventh movements. Another motif featured is a chromatic melody similar to the one played by the soprano saxophone. This melody is played by the bass clarinets and horns, and features a "spinning" cycle of notes based around D♯ and E. It appears in the prologue and returns multiple times in the ninth movement, "Dispelling the Fears".

=== Movements ===
Blood on the Floor consists of nine movements:

1. Prologue: "Blood on the Floor" ("Biting", = 108)
2. "Junior Addict" ("Slow and Sensuous", = 60)
3. "Shout" ("Harsh and Hammered", = 160)
4. "Sweet and Decay" ("Dark and muddy, sweet and tender", = 58)
5. "Needles" ( = 144)
6. "Elegy for Andy" ("Tender", = 54–56)
7. "Cut Up" ("Clear cut and incisive", = 132–138)
8. "Crackdown" ("Solo freely", = 140)
9. "Dispelling the Fears" ("Bleak and obsessive (always intense)", = 76)

Each movement features different instrumentation and number of players. A full playing of the suite takes approximately 70–80 minutes.

==== I. Prologue: "Blood on the Floor" ====
The suite's prologue is scored for the orchestra and lasts for approximately eight and a half minutes. The prologue features offbeat rhythms played by the soprano saxophone in a rotation of five chromatic notes. The movement is based around the note E, which is rooted in bass instruments at each end of the movement. Chromatic progressions are a major part of the prologue, which along with irregular shaping and metre changes makes the movement have an unrelenting feel. For example, in bars 66–69, Turnage uses a progression of metres: 4/4 → 7/8 → 3/4 → 7/8. The loss of one quaver (eighth note) when changing to a 7/8 bar gives the music a stumbling feeling. When paired with an accentuated upbeat, this groove helps to reinforce the melody and move the movement forward. Reflecting this, the music critic Andrew Clements wrote that the prologue of Blood on the Floor "is perhaps the most uncompromising and unforgiving music Turnage has written to date".

==== II. "Junior Addict" ====
"It's easier to get dope
than it is to get a job."

Yes, easier to get dope
than to get a job-
daytime or nighttime job,
teen-age, pre-draft,
pre-lifetime job.

— Langston Hughes, Junior Addict, quoted in The Collected Poems of Langston Hughes

This movement is scored for soprano saxophone, electric guitar and orchestra. "Junior Addict" is a wordless musical setting of the eponymous poem, written by Langston Hughes. The movement is in ternary form and lasts for approximately five and three-quarter minutes. "Junior Addict" opens with a theme played by the soprano saxophone, which has been described as a "very lyrical and haunting melody". This reflects the influence of Turnage's brother, whom the movement is dedicated to. The saxophone melody was later revisited by Turnage and used in the third movement of his 1994 composition, Two Elegies Framing a Shout. "Junior Addict" also features an electric guitar solo.

==== III. "Shout" ====
"Shout" is scored for the orchestra and lasts for approximately five and a half minutes. "Shout" both starts and ends with passages played by the scaffolding, which is used as an unpitched percussion instrument throughout the movement, usually paired with the horns. The movements uses a ritornello taken from the prologue, which is found near melodies played by the clarinets.

==== IV. "Sweet and Decay" ====
"Sweet and Decay" is scored for flutes, soprano saxophone and orchestra. The movement is approximately nine minutes long. "Sweet and Decay" originated from one of two sketches Turnage produced for his soprano saxophone concerto, Your Rockaby. The sketch was not used there, as Turnage thought that having two slow movements would be "overdoing it". In "Sweet and Decay", Turnage uses melodic cells set against a chordal background. The movement features solos from the saxophone and flute. At the end of the movement, Turnage instructs that there should be pause before "Needles" begins. This can be replaced with a full interval if wanted.

==== V. "Needles" ====
"Needles" is scored for a jazz sextet and five other performers (trumpet, two horns, trombone and bass clarinet). The movement is a variation of ternary form (AABA) and lasts for approximately four and three-quarter minutes. Out of all the nine movements, "Needles" reflects conventional jazz performances the most. The movement starts with a soprano saxophone head melody, which then progresses to sections of soprano saxophone and electric guitar solos. The brass section continually interrupts the latter solo. These interjections accentuate the offbeats, giving the section a jazzy, big band feel. This feeling is reinforced by the presence of a big band-style riff, played by the group of five performers. After the solos, the movement returns to another playing of the head.

==== VI. "Elegy for Andy" ====
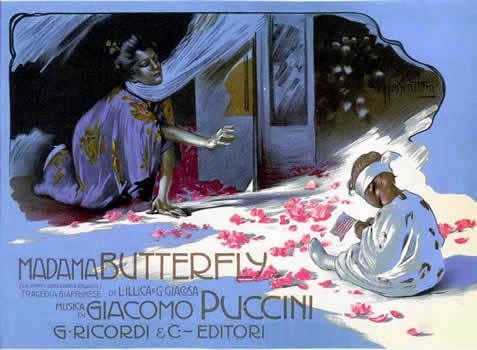
"Elegy for Andy" incorporates musical quotations from Madama Butterfly.

"Elegy for Andy" is scored for electric guitar and orchestra. It lasts for approximately eight and a quarter minutes. The movement has an angular theme played by electric guitar, which creates a sense of unease. The angular feeling is created by Turnage's use of wide intervals of 7ths and 9ths. This guitar melody progresses into an improvisational section. "Elegy for Andy" incorporates musical quotations from a piece played by Turnage at his brother's funeral and Giacomo Puccini's Madama Butterfly. According to Clements, this movement is Blood on the Floor's "emotional heart".

==== VII. "Cut Up" ====
The movement is scored for alto saxophone, trombone, drum kit and orchestra. "Cut Up" features a trombone solo that was described as "fiendish" by Aksel Tollåli of Bachtrack. The movement lasts for approximately six and a quarter minutes. "Cut Up" has a complex structure and has been variously labelled a variation on verse and refrain, rondo and ternary forms. The movement's form can be represented using letters as ABCDACEAFCA.

==== VIII. "Crackdown" ====
"Crackdown" is scored for a jazz trio of guitar, bass clarinet and drum kit. The movement is written in the jazz fusion style, and features improvised solos from all three members of the trio. "Crackdown" is the shortest movement in Blood on the Floor and lasts for approximately four and a quarter minutes. The movement is conventionally not conducted. It opens with a long improvised solo from the drum kit, which lasts for around two minutes. The solo has no metre. During the solo, the drum kit is asked to start pianissimo, before "gradually moving towards rhythmic stability". After the solo ends, the drum kit is instructed to support a funk groove. After solos from the guitar and bass clarinet, the drum kit continues, ending the movement softly.

==== IX. "Dispelling the Fears" ====
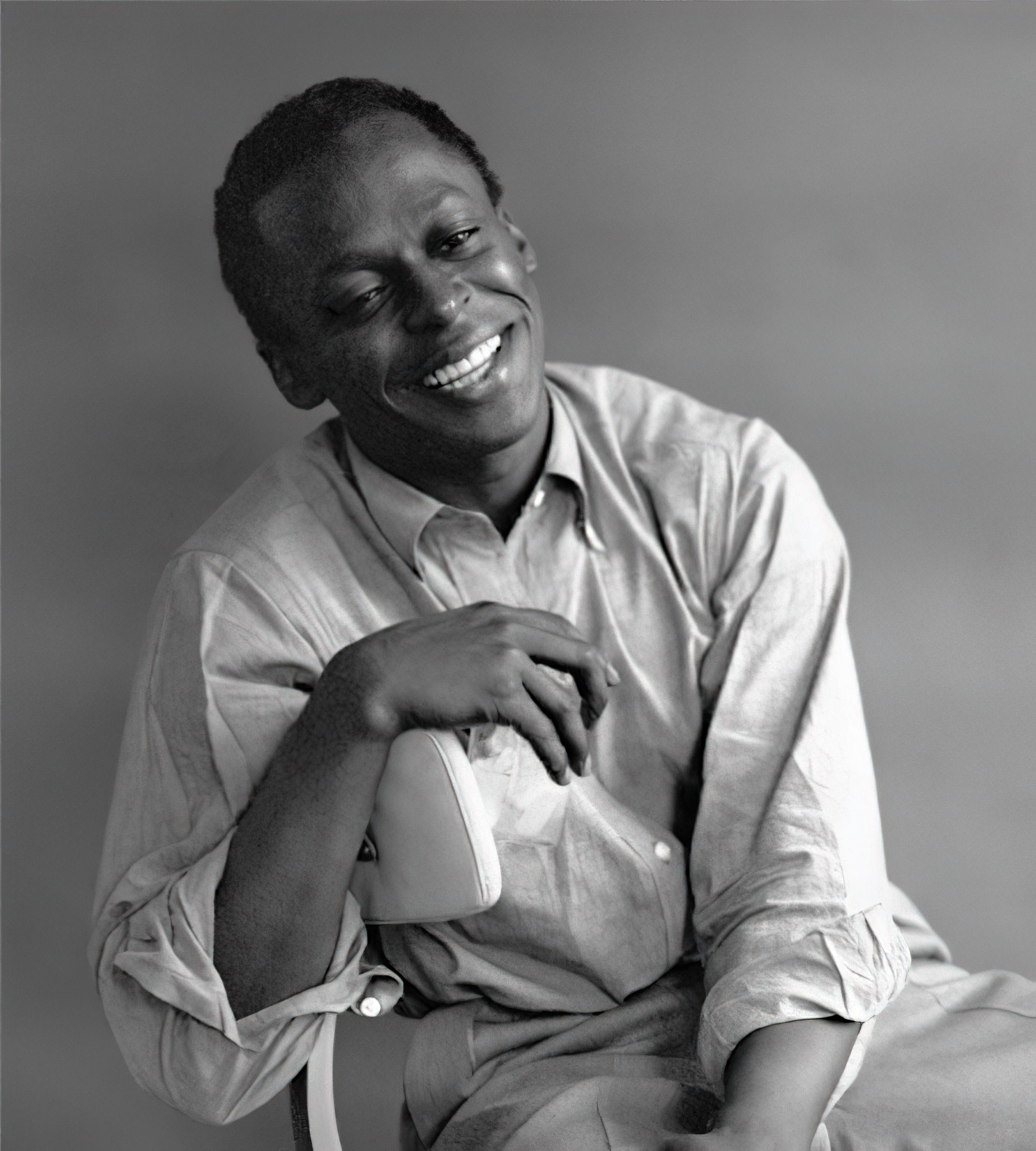
The trumpets in "Dispelling the Fears" have been compared to the style of Miles Davis.

"Dispelling the Fears" is scored for two trumpets and orchestra. The movement takes inspiration from Dispelling the Fears, a painting by the Australian artist Heather Betts, and is dedicated to her and her husband Brett Dean. "Dispelling the Fears" is taken from a previous concerto of the same name that Turnage had composed in 1994. It is the longest movement in Blood on the Floor and lasts for approximately fifteen and three-quarter minutes.

The movement's style is dissimilar to that of the other movements, bar "Sweet and Decay": instead of focusing on rhythmic modulations like the other movements, "Dispelling the Fears" is centred on slowly moving chords. Like "Sweet and Decay", the movement features use of cells instead of repeating melodic ideas. "Dispelling the Fears" uses previous themes encountered in Blood on the Floor: the chromatic saxophone melody from the prologue appears again, now appearing as one of the movement's main themes. It is joined by the chord progression from "Needles" which takes place during that movement's solos. The music played by the two solo trumpets has been compared to the style of Miles Davis.

== Performances ==
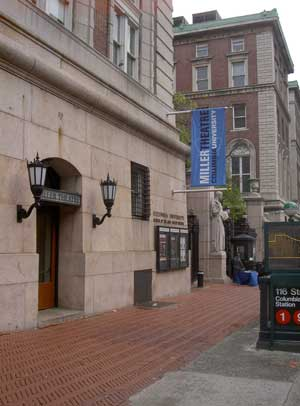
The American premiere of Blood on the Floor took place at the Miller Theatre.

Blood on the Floor was premiered in London in May 1996 at the Queen Elizabeth Hall. It was again performed by the Ensemble Modern at the Salzburg Festival in August 1997. The suite had its American premiere on 28 September 2001 at the Miller Theatre, New York, performed by the Absolute Ensemble under the baton of Kristjan Järvi. As the performance was following the events of the September 11 attacks, the concert almost did not take place due to the "provocative" nature of the music. However, the theatre's manager, George Steel, decided to allow the concert to go ahead, as he did not want "to infantilize the audience".

During his first month as principal conductor of the Berlin Philharmonic, Simon Rattle conducted a performance of Blood on the Floor in October 2002. The orchestra also held a workshop event for young musicians to play the suite; according to Franz Xaver Ohnesorg, who ran the event, "the Blood on the Floor project [gave] a chance to open up a dialogue with young people about drugs.

Blood on the Floor has become a frequently performed piece, often performed several times a year. Stefan Asbury conducted a Boston Symphony Orchestra performance of Blood on the Floor in the Seiji Ozawa Hall to close the 2006 Tanglewood Festival of Contemporary Music. Also in 2006, the suite received its Scottish premiere, conducted by Martyn Brabbins. Six years later, a performance by the Oslo Philharmonic saw Blood on the Floor conducted by Jonathan Stockhammer, with solo performances from Robertson, Erskine and John Parricelli. On 9 April 2021, the Melbourne Symphony Orchestra performed Blood on the Floor at the Hamer Hall, conducted by Fabian Russel. This was part of their Metropolis concert series, and featured solo performances from Carl Mackey (saxophone), James Sherlock (guitar) and Dave Beck (drum kit).

The British choreographer Wayne McGregor chose to use Blood on the Floor as the basis for his debut full-length ballet, L'Anatomie de la sensation. The ballet was influenced by Francis Bacon and premiered in July 2011 with the Paris Opera Ballet. During its run at the Opera Bastille, Turnage's score was performed by the Ensemble intercontemporain.

== Reception ==
Blood on the Floor is commonly seen as Turnage's most extensive fusion of classical and jazz styles. The suite received a mixed reception from critics. Some critics, like Clements, praised the suite. In a review for The Guardian, Clements commented that in Blood on the Floor, "Turnage's use of rock and jazz elements [are] integrated much more thoroughly into the melting pot of his style" than prior compositions, and are "one of the foreground elements for the first time". In The Times, Ivan Hewett appraised how Turnage worked with jazz musicians to create a "truly collaborative piece". In a more mixed review for AllMusic, Richard S. Ginell said that "[...] this is definitely not easy listening entertainment" but considered it to be worth the listening effort.

Other critics took a dislike to the suite. Writing for The Daily Telegraph, Richard Wolfson considered Blood on the Floor a "clumsy attempt" at a fusion of classical and jazz music. Nick Coleman of The Independent agreed, questioning the nature of the work:

Is it possible to lose the funk in the bleak architectonics of [Turnage's] formal composition? Or do we have to take it on trust, because Turnage is interested in "urban alienation" and wrote for American jazzers John Scofield and Peter Erskine in his Francis Bacon-inspired Blood on the Floor suite, that some kind of cold fusion has taken place between the tradition of Miles and Marvin and that of European art music?

== Recordings ==
Title	Conductor	Performers	Label	Year	Ref(s)
Unknown Public 08: Sensuality: Essence And Nonsence (Note: Only movement four (Sweet and Decay))	Peter Rundel	Ensemble Modern, with John Scofield (guitar), Martin Robertson (saxophone) and Peter Erskine (drums)	Unknown Public	1996	
Blood on the Floor	Peter Rundel	Ensemble Modern, with John Scofield (guitar), Martin Robertson (saxophone) and Peter Erskine (drums)	Argo	1998 (Note: Some sources say 1997)	
Some Days; Your Rockaby; Dispelling the Fears; Blood on the Floor	Peter Rundel	Ensemble Modern, with John Scofield (guitar), Martin Robertson (saxophone) and Peter Erskine (drums)	Decca	2001	
Blood on the Floor (Note: Video performance recorded by Hessischer Rundfunk)	Peter Rundel	Ensemble Modern, with John Scofield (guitar), Martin Robertson (saxophone) and Peter Erskine (drums)	Arthaus Musik	2006	

== See also ==
- Orchestral jazz
- Postmodern music

== Notes, references and sources ==
=== Sources ===
- Birdle, Marc (12 April 1996). "Unacknowledged Notation". New Statesman. Vol. 9, no. 398. London. pp. 32–33. ISSN 1364-7431.
- Burrows, John; Wiffen, Charles, eds. (2012). The Complete Classical Music Guide. London: Dorling Kindersley. ISBN 978-0-7566-9256-8.
- Clark, Duncan (1998). Classical Music: the Rough Guide (2nd ed.). London: Rough Guides. ISBN 978-1-85828-257-2.
- Clements, Andrew (2000). Mark-Anthony Turnage. London: Faber and Faber. ISBN 978-0-571-19702-6.
- Evans, Gary (2002). Music Inspired by Art. Music Library Association Index and Bibliography series, No. 30. Lanham, Maryland: Scarecrow Press. ISBN 978-0-8108-4509-1.
- Gimbel, Allen (October 2000). "Guide to Records: Turnage". American Record Guide. 63 (5). Cincinnati. ISSN 0003-0716.
- Hughes, Langston (1995). Rampersad, Arnold; Roessel, David Ernest (eds.). The Collected Poems of Langston Hughes. New York City: Knopf Doubleday. ISBN 978-0-679-42631-8.
- Isserlis, Steven; Rye, Matthew (2017). 1001 Classical Recordings You Must Hear Before You Die. New York City: Chartwell Books. ISBN 978-0-7858-3582-0. Archived from the original on 11 August 2023.
- Kandell, Leslie (December 2006). "Festival of Contemporary Music". American Record Guide. 69 (6). Cincinnati. ISSN 0003-0716.
- Lowery, Christopher (2011). Between Two Worlds (Master's thesis). Ann Arbor, Michigan: University Microfilms International (University of Louisville). ISBN 978-1-2434-3912-3.
- Noltingk, Jacqueline Susan (2017). The Scottish Orchestras and New Music, 1945-2015 (PhD thesis). University of Glasgow. OCLC 1040038557. Archived from the original on 8 May 2023.
- Oliver, Benjamin (March 2010). Integration in Music: Controlling Diverse Methods of Expression within the Context of the Globalisation of Musical Culture (DPhil thesis). University of Sussex. OCLC 809551236.
- Smith, Steve (16 November 2002). "The Classical Score". Billboard. Vol. 114, no. 46. Cincinnati. pp. 19–24. ISSN 0006-2510.
- Stuart, Philip (2009). Complete Decca Classical Discography, 1929–2009. London: Centre for the History and Analysis of Recorded Music (CHARM). Archived from the original on 20 March 2022.
- Styles, Mathew John (2008). An Evaluation of the Concept of Third Stream Music and its Applicability to Selected Works by Gunther Schuller and Mark-Anthony Turnage (DMA thesis). University of Western Australia. OCLC 903878320.
- Turnage, Mark-Anthony (Autumn 2008). "Mark-Anthony Turnage". Tate Etc. No. 14. London. pp. 67–70. ISSN 1743-8853.
- Vellianitis, Alexi (2018). Urban Musical Modernism in 'Broken Britain' (DPhil thesis). St Peter's College (University of Oxford). OCLC 1104039878.
