= Twice Through the Heart =

Opera by Mark-Anthony Turnage

- Opera by Mark-Anthony Turnage
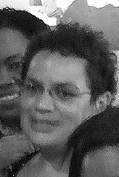
- Poet Jackie Kay
- Description: scena; monodrama; song cycle; chamber opera
- Librettist: Jackie Kay
- Based on: 1992 poetry documentary
- Premiere: 13 June 1997; Aldeburgh Festival

Twice Through the Heart is a musical work by the English composer Mark-Anthony Turnage, variously described as a dramatic scena, as a monodrama, as a song cycle, as a chamber opera or even as a "dramatic song-cycle-cum-scena". It is scored for mezzo-soprano and 16 instrumentalists and sets an English-language libretto by the Scottish poet Jackie Kay based on her script for a television programme about a woman jailed for killing her violent husband.

Originally intended to be a full-length opera, Twice was composed between 1994 and 1996, undergoing substantial reworking before Turnage found a form with which he was satisfied. It was first performed in 1997 when it was put on both in the concert hall and in the opera house. The critical reception has been generally favourable, with several authors commenting positively about the instrumental writing and emotional impact of the work, though some critics see limitations in the libretto, find the mood of the work too unrelenting or note the great demands that the vocal writing provides for the soloist.

== Background and composition ==
Twice Through the Heart is based on a 1992 poetry documentary of the same name that Kay had written for the BBC television series Words on Film. Kay was concerned by inequalities in how the legal system treats men and women who kill their spouses and, in particular, in how the law on provocation in the United Kingdom was then interpreted, allowing a defence to murder only in the context of what happened immediately before a homicide and excluding the battered woman defence which considers the broader context which may have involved years of violent abuse. She chose to base the poems on a specific true case, that of Amelia Rossiter, a woman in her sixties who refused to give evidence in court about the years of violence from her husband that eventually led to her stabbing him twice through the heart with a kitchen knife. By the time Kay's programme was broadcast, Rossiter had been freed, her conviction reduced to manslaughter after her plea of provocation was accepted.

Turnage, who had previously composed one full-length opera, Greek, worked on the musical version of Twice between 1994 and 1996. It was commissioned by the John S. Cohen Foundation. He had learnt of Kay's original work after he was shown a copy of the BBC video by poet and artistic director Maura Dooley. It was a difficult development with Turnage at one point abandoning the work in favour of other pieces. Composer and librettist had started out with the intention of developing a full-length opera including both soprano and baritone narrators. (The original television script had included poems for the judge as well as for the woman.) However, the creators felt that their attempts at redeveloping and expanding the original work "water[ed] down its impact" and they eventually cut everything apart from the woman's words. Both text and setting also underwent repeated changes in detail. Kay changed some of the wording to make it easier to sing. Similarly, Turnage revised the music after trying it out with Sally Burgess who was to give the first performance. He had become Composer in Association with English National Opera (ENO) in 1995 and was able to thoroughly workshop Twice and its companion piece with ENO's Contemporary Opera Studio before arriving at their respective final versions.

== Description ==
Twice Through the Heart lasts for approximately 30 minutes. It consists of nine musical numbers arranged in three sections. It is narrated by a woman in the prison cell where she has been sent for the murder of her husband. To express the woman's feelings, Kay deliberately chose a voice that was unpoetic: "I wanted the voice to be so everyday, it would be banal." Turnage's music too includes similarly basic material, what critic Tom Service describes as "simple hummable tunes", but these are transformed and distorted, a metaphor for how initial loving intimacy is destroyed and distorted by years of violence and abuse. Turnage's musical language is modernist but influenced by jazz, an area of musical interest he shared with Kay.

The instrumental scoring is for flute (doubling alto flute), oboe (doubling cor anglais), 2 clarinets (one doubling bass clarinet), horn, trumpet, trombone, one percussionist, harp, piano (doubling celeste), violin, 2 violas, 2 cellos and double bass. The percussion consists of 8 crotales, vibraphone, marimba, suspended cymbal, 3 gongs, tam-tam, bass drum, pedal bass drum, ratchet, claves and whip.

=== The work ===
==== Part One ====
1. No Way Out — The woman tells of how her husband beat her and threatened to garotte her with a towel and of how she picked up a kitchen knife to defend herself.
2. Inside (part 1) — The woman is in jail thinking of how she failed to take her lawyer's advice to give evidence about her husband's violence, because she did not want to be disloyal.
3. Love — She remembers how she and her husband once loved each other and how things went wrong after their child was born.

==== Part Two ====
4. By the Sea — She thinks of how she felt trapped in their house by the sea because she could not talk of his violence.
5. Inside (part 2) — She thinks of her husband and of her "heart, broken like bones".
6. Four Walls — She is trapped within the four walls of her house, her husband turning down suggestions of holidays and writing instructions for her in notes.

==== Part Three ====
7. Interlude — Instrumental section.
8. Landslide — Her husband is buried in land, she in prison.
9. China Cup — She is locked in with only the decorated china cup which she has taken from home to prison.

== Performance and recording history ==
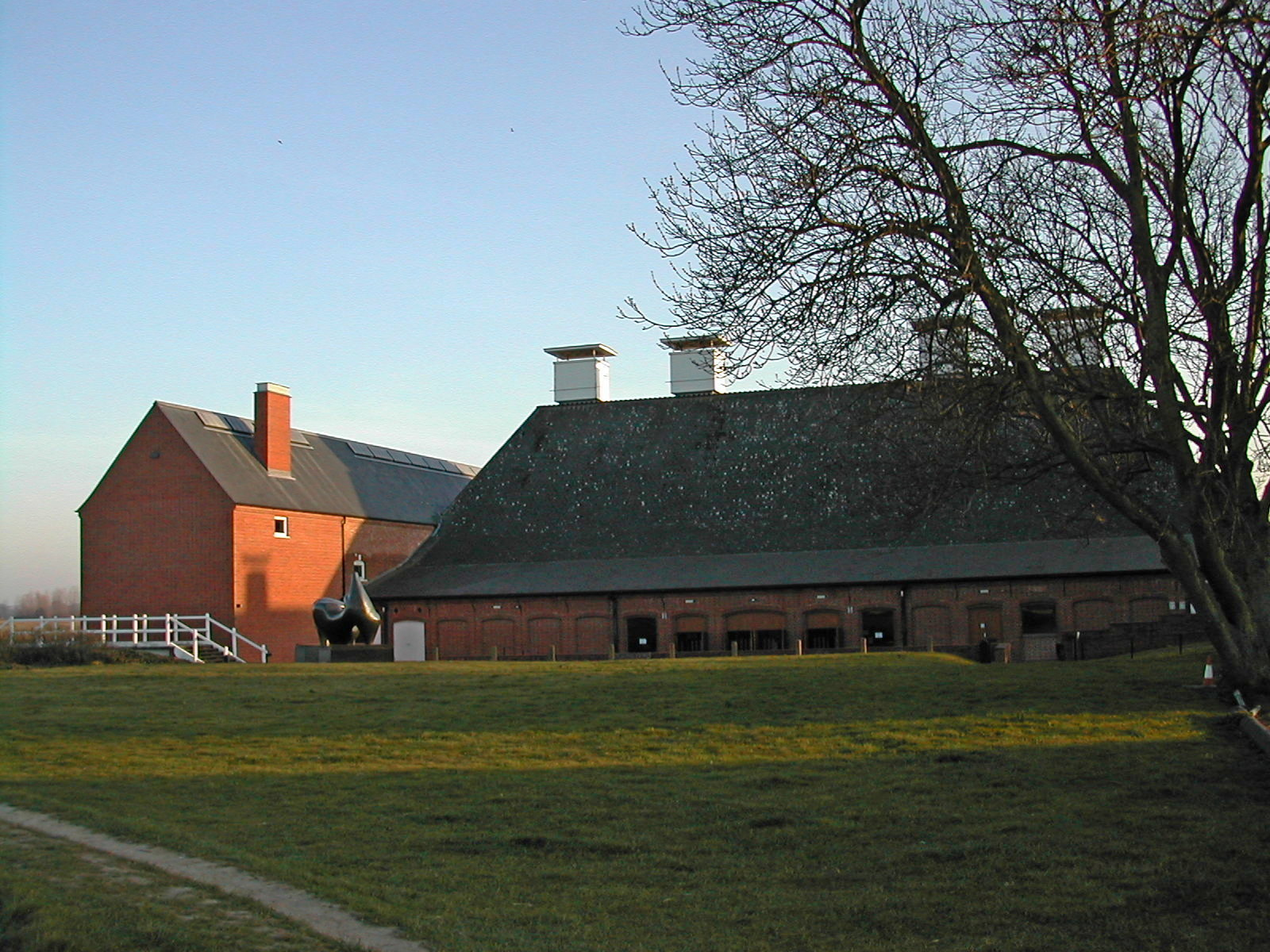
Snape Maltings concert hall where Twice Through the Heart was first performed

Twice Through the Heart was first performed on 13 June 1997 at the Snape Maltings Concert Hall during the 50th Aldeburgh Festival. Sally Burgess was accompanied by the ENO Contemporary Opera Studio conducted by Nicholas Kok. The companion piece was the chamber opera The Country of the Blind which Turnage had composed relatively quickly in order to make up a full programme after Twice had turned out much shorter than originally intended. To Turnage's surprise, ENO decided to follow up the original four performances, split between Snape Maltings and the Queen Elizabeth Hall, with a staging at its main home in the London Coliseum. This production was premiered on 20 October 1997 with Susan Bickley as the soloist and with Kok again conducting. In this context it was a companion piece for From the House of the Dead, an opera set in a Siberian prison camp.

Twice had received its mainland European premiere a day earlier than the first Coliseum performance, when it was given by the State Opera in Gießen, Germany. In 1998, Twice received its North American premiere in Winnipeg, Manitoba, Canada and was also given in the United States, (by the New York Philharmonic,) Italy, Belgium and the Netherlands. In these last two countries composer Oliver Knussen conducted. The work has continued to receive international performances, for example by the Chicago Symphony Orchestra in 2009.

A commercial recording was made in 2007 with Sarah Connolly singing and Marin Alsop conducting the London Philharmonic Orchestra. Some live performances have been recorded for broadcast, including one at the Queen Elizabeth Hall with the original performers, and the Winnipeg performance.

== Reception ==
In reviewing the first performance for The Independent, Nick Kimberley felt that the Twice Through the Heart "w[ore] the scars of a difficult birth" with Sally Burgess "strain[ing] to find specific expression in the sharp angles and steep slides Turnage provided" in a work that Kimberley considered less natural than its relatively quickly written companion piece. For this critic, the instrumental writing came over far more successfully than the vocal part with Kimberley praising the use of colour and finding the "draining" final climax particularly effective. Michael Kennedy, in contrast to Kimberley, found the scena "the more dramatic and musically more inventive" of the two works performed that night.

Bernard Holland, of The New York Times heard both the Aldeburgh and New York premieres. He noted the influence both of Alban Berg and, in the strings and percussion, of rock music and appreciated a musical language that makes modernism easier on the ears. However, he felt a degree of ambivalence about a composer he described as "theatrical... in both the good and bad senses of the word."

Geoff Brown, reviewing Marin Alsop and Sarah Connolly's recording in The Times, praised the directness of both Kay's and Turnage's writing and described Twice Through the Heart and its "awful clarity" as "among the best in Turnage's recent output". David Gutman suggested in Gramophone that "if listeners feel uncomfortable with the mix of artful delivery and documentary realism, that may be part of the intended effect." The critics of The Daily Telegraph were later to list this disc among the hundred best classical recordings.

John von Rhein of the Chicago Tribune noted the trickiness of the solo part and criticised the "banality" of Kay's verse but reported that he "was held by the sensitive lyrical, rather Bergian vocal writing and often translucent scoring". "The woman's suppressed anger and fear rise to the surface through Turnage's music – poignant gritty yet always compassionate." Considering the same Chicago performance, freelance music critic Lawrence A. Johnson, was taken by the use of instrumental colour and also by Turnage's "whipcrack rhythmic vitality", but "If Twice through the Heart [sic] just misses being one of Turnage's top-drawer works, it's because of the somewhat unvaried air of doleful melancholy as well as the text's more pedestrian moments and repetition."

Not all critics have been hostile to Kay's poetry: reviewing a concert by the London Sinfonietta, Nicholas Williams refers to her "arresting text". Whether positive or negative, the music critics only assessed part of Kay's original work. In considering the original television version of Twice, the literary critic Laura Severin, praised the contrasted voices and the use of repetition as an adaptation to a medium where listeners would be less attentive to the words than if they were attending a conventional poetry reading. She also saw Kay's portrayal of Rossiter as one that avoided both a conventional masculine representation of her as a ruthless murderer and an overly simplistic feminist one of her as a passive victim.
