= Gerald Finley =

Canadian bass-baritone opera singer

Gerald Finley OC, CBE
- Born: Gerald Hunter Finley; January 30, 1960 (age 66); Montreal, Canada
- Genre: Opera
- Occupation: Bass-baritone singer

Gerald Hunter Finley, OC, CBE (born January 30, 1960) is a Canadian bass-baritone opera singer.

== Early life ==
Finley was born in Montreal and studied music at St. Matthew's Anglican Church, Ottawa, the University of Ottawa, King's College, Cambridge and the Royal College of Music in London, securing a place at the National Opera Studio. His great-uncle and former organist of Westminster Abbey, Sir William McKie, who lived during his last years in Ottawa, encouraged him in his early musical activities.

== Career ==
In 1985 Finley appeared in the Royal College of Music production of Le Testament de la tante Caroline as the notary Maître Corbeau, and in La vera costanza the following year, where his "rounded bass and an aptness for conventionalised comedy made a vivid character of the rich fop, Villotto".

Finley is particularly renowned for his interpretations of Mozart roles such as Guglielmo, Papageno, Figaro, Count Almaviva and Don Giovanni. He made his Salzburger Festspiele debut in 1991 and returned on several occasions since then, including as Count Almaviva in 2007 and 2009, Don Giovanni in 2011 and Don Alfonso in Così fan tutte in 2013. In 2017 he received critical acclaim for his portrayal of Aribert Reimann’s Lear.

He made his New York City debut at the Metropolitan Opera on January 24, 1998, as Papageno in Die Zauberflöte. He has subsequently performed the title role of Don Giovanni, Marcello in Puccini's La bohème, and the title role of Rossini's Guillaume Tell at the Metropolitan Opera.

In addition to his success with Mozart, Finley has been active in contemporary opera. He has created a number of roles including J. Robert Oppenheimer in the world premiere of John Adams' opera Doctor Atomic at the San Francisco Opera on October 1, 2005. This opera had its Metropolitan Opera premiere with Finley in the Oppenheimer role on October 13, 2008, and was broadcast as part of the Met's Live in HD broadcast series on November 8, 2008. Other roles he has originated include Harry Heegan in The Silver Tassie by Mark-Anthony Turnage at the English National Opera and the title role in Fantastic Mr. Fox by Tobias Picker at the Los Angeles Opera.

Expanding his repertoire, Finley sang the title role of Eugene Onegin at the Royal Opera House, Covent Garden in March 2008. This was the second time he has sung a Tchaikovsky role for the Royal Opera; the first being Prince Yeletsky, from Pique Dame. In 2011 he sang Hans Sachs in the Glyndebourne Opera production of Die Meistersinger von Nürnberg to much critical acclaim.

Finley debuted at Wiener Staatsoper as Count Almaviva in Le nozze di Figaro on June 3, 2012. He returned for lead roles in the premieres of two important new productions: the Forester in Janáček’s Příhody lišky Bystroušky in June 2014, and Amfortas in Wagner’s Parsifal in March 2017.

Finley has been critically praised in both opera and concert. After a recital at Carnegie Hall in March 2007, he was praised by New York Times critic Bernard Holland as having a "bass-baritone of easy luxury" and that his "sensibilities begin with the pre-eminence of words." His portrayal of Schumann's Dichterliebe at the Wigmore Hall in 2006 was also highly praised.

Finley appears on a number of recordings, including several solo albums on the Hyperion label, including Bach cantatas, songs by Barber, Ives and Ravel, Schubert's Schwanengesang and Winterreise, Brahms's Vier ernste Gesänge, and Schumann's Dichterliebe and Liederkreis.

In June 2014, he was made an Officer of the Order of Canada.

In October 2014 he opened the Canadian Opera Company 2014-2015 season as the title character in Falstaff. It was his return to the company after an absence of 20 years and his first appearance as Verdi's Fat Knight.

On May 14, 2015, he performed the world premiere of True Fire by the Finnish composer Kaija Saariaho, which the composer dedicated to Finley.

Finley was appointed Commander of the Order of the British Empire (CBE) in the 2017 Birthday Honours (UK) for services to opera.

Finley portrayed the knight Gurnemanz in an Eastertide production of Wagner's Parsifal at Wiener Staatsoper in April 2017.

On August 20, 2019, Finley performed the baritone solo in the BBC Proms performance of William Walton's "Belshazzar's Feast".

In September 2020, during the COVID-19 pandemic, Finley played the titular role in Bluebeard's Castle in a London Symphony Orchestra performance which was made available online.

== Selected discography ==
Finley's many recordings include:

- Franz Schubert: Winterreise, accompanied by Julius Drake (Hyperion, 2014)
- Songs by Samuel Barber, accompanied by Julius Drake (Hyperion, 2007)
- Maurice Ravel: Songs, accompanied by Julius Drake (Hyperion, 2009)
- Wigmore (Hall) Live, Songs by Tchaikovsky, Musorgsky and Rorem, accompanied Julius Drake (Wigmore Live, 2008)
- Ives: Songs (vol.11), Romanzo di Central Park with Gerald Finley, accompanied by Julius Drake (Hyperion, 2008)
- Vaughan Williams: The Pilgrim's Progress, conducted by Richard Hickox (Chandos, 1998)
