= Greek (play) =

- Poster advertising the 1988 production of Greek at the Wyndham's Theatre.
- Original language: English
- Written by: Steven Berkoff
- Based on: Oedipus Rex by Sophocles
- Genre: Verse drama
- Setting: London's East End

Premiere
- Date: 11 February 1980
- Place: Half Moon Theatre, London

Greek is a verse play by Steven Berkoff. It was first performed at The Half Moon Theatre, London on 11 February 1980. It is a retelling of Sophocles' Oedipus Rex. Berkoff wrote:

"Greek came to me via Sophocles, trickling its way down the millennia until it reached the unimaginable wastelands of Tufnell Park ... In my eyes, Britain seemed to have become a gradually decaying island, preyed upon by the wandering hordes who saw no future for themselves in a society which had few ideals or messages to offer them."

== Notable productions ==
World premiere

11 February 1980 at the Half Moon Theatre, London.
Directed by Steven Berkoff.

- Eddy & Fortune-teller - Barry Philips
- Dad & Manager of cafe - Matthew Scurfield
- Wife, Doreen & Waitress 1 - Linda Marlowe
- Mum, Sphinx & Waitress 2 - Janet Amsden

The production transferred in September 1980 to the Arts Theatre Club, with Deirdre Morris replacing Janet Amsden.

1988 London revival

29 June 1988 at the Wyndham's Theatre, London.
Directed by Steven Berkoff.

- Eddy & Fortune-teller - Bruce Payne
- Dad & Manager of cafe - Steven Berkoff
- Wife, Doreen & Waitress 1 - Gillian Eaton
- Mum, Sphinx & Waitress 2 - Georgia Brown

== Opera adaptation ==
The play was used as the basis for a well-received opera of the same name composed by Mark-Anthony Turnage and first performed in 1988.
