= Night Dances =

- Orchestral suite by Mark-Anthony Turnage
- Composed: 1981
- Performed: February 2, 1982 - London
- Published: 1987 - London
- Movements: 4
- Scoring: orchestra; amplified ensemble; off-stage string quintet

Night Dances is one of the first compositions for orchestra written by British composer Mark-Anthony Turnage. It was written in 1981 and was awarded the Guinness Prize for composition that year.

== Background ==
Night Dances was composed in 1981 and was the first piece to grant Turnage notoriety among composers and musicians. Even though he was strongly influenced by his teacher, Oliver Knussen, at the Royal College of Music, Turnage tried to "evoke feelings and emotions" after first coming in contact with Black music and, especially, Miles Davis's music. The piece was premiered on February 1, 1982 at St John's, Smith Square by the London Sinfonietta conducted by Simon Bainbridge. It was published in 1987 by Schott.

== Structure ==
This suite for orchestra is divided into four movements and takes around 14 minutes to perform. The scoring can be divided into three groups: first, a full orchestra (two flutes, two piccolos, two clarinets in B-flat, a bassoon, two horns, a trumpet in C, a large percussion section consisting of a xylophone, a glockenspiel, a side drum, a woodblock, a tambourine, four tom-toms, claves, two suspended cymbals, a hi-hat, two large tam-tams and two very large tam-tam, and a string section consisting of twelve first violins, twelve second violins, eight violas, eight cellos, and four double basses); then, an amplified solo group consisting of an oboe, a cor anglais, a trumpet in B-flat, a harp, a celesta, and a piano; finally, an off-stage string quintet consisting of two violins, a viola, and two cellos.

The movement list is as follows:

1. Prelude
2. Dance 1
3. Nocturne
4. Dance 2

The general tone of the suite is sensual and atmospheric. Tempo variations are frequent in the dances, but the tempo is generally slow and calm in the first and third movements. One of the suite's most distinctive traits is the third movement, which is influenced by jazz music. It mainly features an amplified trumpet that is required to stand up throughout the whole solo. It is accompanied by a side drum played with wire brushes. Even though a basic rhythm is proposed in the score, the composer asks the drummer to embellish and improvise around the rhythm in a circular motion throughout the whole movement.
