= Sarah Connolly =

English mezzo-soprano

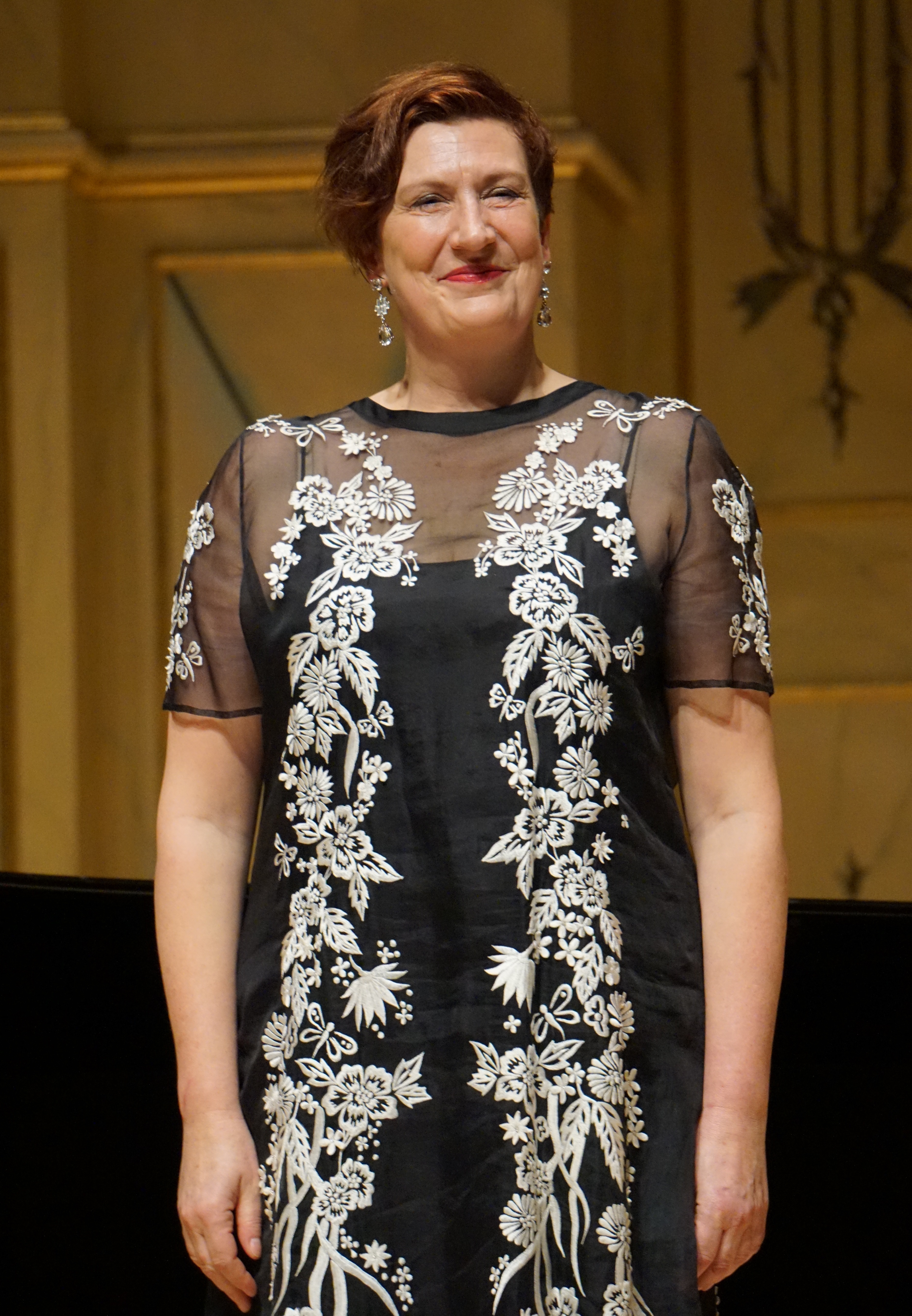
Connolly after a recital at Clayton State University's Spivey Hall in 2017

Dame Sarah Patricia Connolly DBE (born 13 June 1963) is an English mezzo-soprano. Although best known for her baroque and classical roles, Connolly has a wide-ranging repertoire which has included works by Wagner as well as various 20th-century composers. She was appointed a Commander of the Order of the British Empire (CBE) in the 2010 New Year Honours and a Dame Commander of the Order of the British Empire (DBE) in the 2017 Birthday Honours for services to music.

== Life ==
Connolly was born in County Durham and educated at Queen Margaret's School, York, Clarendon College in Nottingham and then studied piano and singing at the Royal College of Music, of which she is now a Fellow. She then became a member of the BBC Singers for five years.

== Career ==
Connolly's interest in opera and a full-time career in classical music began after she left the BBC Singers. She began her opera career in the role of Annina (Der Rosenkavalier) in 1994. Her breakthrough role was as Xerxes in the 1998 English National Opera production of Handel's Serse (Xerxes), directed by Nicholas Hytner.

In 2005, she sang the title role in Handel's Giulio Cesare for Glyndebourne Festival Opera. The DVD of the production, directed by David McVicar, won a Gramophone Award. Singing the part of Sesto in McVicar's production of La Clemenza di Tito for English National Opera in 2006, Connolly was nominated for an Olivier Award. Her 2005 debut at the Metropolitan Opera was in the same opera, but in the role of Annio.

In 2009, she sang (in Purcell's Dido and Aeneas) at Teatro alla Scala and made her debut at the Royal Opera House, Covent Garden as Dido in the same opera. In 2010, she made her role debut of "Der Komponist" in Ariadne auf Naxos at the Metropolitan Opera. She was awarded the 2011 Distinguished Musician Award from the Incorporated Society of Musicians. For her recital at Alice Tully Hall in New York, Connolly received a rave review in The New York Times.

She made her debut as Fricka in Wagner's Der Ring des Nibelungen (Royal Opera House) and earlier that year she sang Phèdre in Rameau's Hippolyte et Aricie (Paris Opéra at the Palais Garniér). Connolly reprised Phèdre for Glyndebourne Festival Opera in a production by Jonathan Kent 2013, conducted by William Christie.

Connolly won the Silver Lyre 2012 from the Royal Philharmonic Society for Best Solo Singer and was nominated in the Best Female Singer category in the inaugural International Opera Awards held in London in 2013, and she was the recipient of the 2013 Most Outstanding Achievement in a Main Role for WhatsOnStage Opera Poll as Octavian in Der Rosenkavalier with English National Opera.

During the 2011 Gustav Mahler celebrations, Connolly performed all of his vocal works in the UK and abroad with the Philharmonia and Maazel, the LPO and Jurowski and Nezet Séguin, the LSO with Alsop, the OAE with Rattle and the Leipzig Gewandhaus Orchestra under Chailly. She sang in the opening concert of the BBC Promenade Concerts of 2012, televised from the Royal Albert Hall, also performing Tippett's A Child of our Time later in the series. She is committed to promoting new music; her performances include Sir John Tavener's Tribute to Cavafy at the Symphony Hall, Birmingham and his film music to Children of Men.

Connolly made the first commercial recording of Mark-Anthony Turnage's Twice Through the Heart with Marin Alsop and the London Philharmonic Orchestra having previously given the Belgian and Dutch premieres of the work with the Schoenberg Ensemble conducted by Oliver Knussen. She sang the role of Susie in the premiere production of Turnage's opera The Silver Tassie at English National Opera in 2000.

Connolly's other commercial recordings include Schumann lieder with Eugene Asti for Chandos, "Songs of Love and Loss", Korngold lieder with Iain Burnside, the Duruflé Requiem for Signum and Purcell's Dido and Aeneas with the Orchestra of the Age of Enlightenment for which she raised the funds and selected the cast for the recording.

In September 2009, Connolly made her first appearance as a guest soloist at The Last Night of the Proms, singing Rule, Britannia! while wearing a replica Royal Navy uniform of Lord Nelson.

She was awarded an honorary Doctor of Music degree by Nottingham Trent University in 2017.

In July 2019 she announced temporary leave to undergo breast cancer surgery withdrawing from upcoming performances in BBC Proms and Orpheus and Eurydice with English National Opera.

In December 2023 it was announced that she would be the eighteenth recipient of the King's Medal for Music.

== Personal life ==
Connolly lives in Broadstairs.

== Operatic roles ==
=== Royal Opera House ===
George Enescu

- Oedipe (Jocaste)

Henry Purcell

- Dido and Aeneas (Dido)

Richard Wagner

- Das Rheingold (Fricka)
- Die Walküre (Fricka)
- Tristan und Isolde (Brangäne)

=== Welsh National Opera ===
Benjamin Britten

- Peter Grimes (Auntie)

Richard Strauss

- Ariadne auf Naxos (Der Komponist)

=== Opera North ===
Gaetano Donizetti

- Maria Stuarda (Maria)

Vincenzo Bellini

- I Capuleti e i Montecchi (Romeo)

=== English National Opera ===
Vincenzo Bellini

- I Capuleti e i Montecchi (Romeo)

Alban Berg

- Lulu (Geschwitz)

Hector Berlioz

- Les Troyens (Dido)

Benjamin Britten

- The Rape of Lucretia (Lucretia)

Marc-Antoine Charpentier

- Medea (Medea)

George Frideric Handel

- Alcina (Ruggiero)
- Agrippina (Agrippina)
- Ariodante (Ariodante)
- Semele (Ino)
- Serse (Serse)

Claudio Monteverdi

- L'incoronazione di Poppea (Empress Ottavia)

Wolfgang Amadeus Mozart

- La clemenza di Tito (Sesto) – 2006 Laurence Olivier Award nomination for Outstanding Achievement in Opera

Henry Purcell

- Dido and Aeneas (Dido)

Richard Strauss

- Der Rosenkavalier (Octavian)

Mark-Anthony Turnage

- The Silver Tassie (Susie)

=== Scottish Opera ===
- Richard Strauss: Der Rosenkavalier (Octavian)

=== Glyndebourne Festival Opera ===
- George Frideric Handel: Giulio Cesare (Giulio Cesare)
- Johann Sebastian Bach: St. Matthew Passion
- Richard Wagner: Tristan und Isolde (Brangäne)
- Rameau: Hippolyte et Aricie (Phèdre)
- Brett Dean: Hamlet (Gertrude)

=== Opéra National de Paris ===
- Handel: Giulio Cesare (Sesto)
- Rameau: Hippolyte et Aricie (Phèdre)

=== La Scala, Milan ===
- Henry Purcell: Dido and Aeneas (Dido)

=== Maggio Musicale, Florence ===
- Claudio Monteverdi: L'incoronazione di Poppea (Nerone)

=== La Monnaie, Brussels ===
- Henry Purcell: Dido and Aeneas (Dido)

=== De Nederlandse Opera ===
Handel

- Giulio Cesare (Giulio Cesare)
- Ariodante (Ariodante)

=== Liceu, Barcelona ===
Monteverdi

- L'incoronazione di Poppea (Nerone)

Handel

- Agrippina (Agrippina)

Wagner

- Tristan und Isolde (Brangäne)

=== Festival d'Aix-en-Provence ===
Mozart

- La Clemenza di Tito (Sesto)

Handel

- Ariodante (Ariodante)

=== Bavarian State Opera, Munich ===
- Britten: Rape of Lucretia (Lucretia)
- Gluck: Orfeo ed Euridice (Orfeo)

=== Bayreuth Festival ===
Richard Wagner

- Das Rheingold (Fricka)
- Die Walküre (Fricka)

=== Festspielhaus Baden-Baden ===
Richard Wagner

- Tristan und Isolde (Brangäne)

=== Vienna State Opera ===
George Frideric Handel

- Ariodante (Ariodante)

=== Roles in the United States ===
New York City Opera

- Vincenzo Bellini: I Capuleti e i Montecchi (Romeo)
- George Frideric Handel: Ariodante (Ariodante)
- George Frideric Handel: Xerxes (Xerxes)

Metropolitan Opera

- Wolfgang Amadeus Mozart: La clemenza di Tito (Annio)
- Richard Strauss: Ariadne auf Naxos (The Composer)
- Richard Strauss: Capriccio (Clairon)

San Francisco Opera

- George Frideric Handel: Semele (Ino and Juno)

== Recordings ==
Recordings include:

- Gustav Mahler Das Lied von der Erde - PENTATONE, 2020
- Henry Purcell "Dido and Aeneas" Chandos/OAE, 2009
- Frank Bridge Orchestral Songs Chandos/BBCNOW/Hickox, 2005
- Edward Elgar: Bournemouth Symphony Orchestra, Simon Wright The Music Makers / Sea Pictures Naxos. GRAMMY NOMINATED 2006 (Solo Vocal category)
- Edward Elgar: The Very Best of Elgar 8.552133-34
- George Frideric Handel: Giulio Cesare (Glyndebourne, 2006) – Glyndebourne Festival Opera – OAE / Christie/Opus Arte GRAMMOPHONE AWARD WINNER (Best Early Opera)
- George Frideric Handel: Heroes and Heroines – The Sixteen / Harry Christophers, Coro
- George Frideric Handel: Solomon (Solomon) Harmonia Mundi (2007 release)
- Leoš Janáček: The Cunning Little Vixen – The Innkeepers Wife, ARTHAUS DVD, 1995
- Gustav Mahler Des Knaben Wunderhorn – OCE / Herreweghe Harmonia Mundi, 2006 EDISON AWARD WINNER (Solo Vocal category)
- Gustav Mahler Das Lied von der Erde - London Philharmonic Orchestra / Yannick Nézet-Séguin - Recorded live at Southbank Centre's Royal Festival Hall, London, on 19 February 2011
- Felix Mendelssohn: Songs and Duets Vol. 3 Hyperion, 2004
- Felix Mendelssohn: Elijah – The Queen/Soprano soloist, Winged Lion, 2012
- Wolfgang Amadeus Mozart – Mass in C Minor and Haydn – Scena di Bernice – Gabrieli Consort / McCreesh DG, 2006
- Arnold Schoenberg: BBC Voices – Blood Red Carnations: Songs by Arnold Schoenberg Black Box, 2002
- John Tavener: Children of Men
- The Exquisite Hour – Recital Disc: Songs by Brahms, Britten, Hahn, Haydn (Eugene Asti) Signum Classics, 2006
- Robert Schumann: Songs of Love and Loss (Eugene Asti) – Chandos, 2008
- Erich Korngold: Sonett für Wien: Songs of Erich Korngold Sarah Connolly (mezzo-soprano), William Dazeley (baritone), Iain Burnside (piano) Signum Classics SIGCD160
- Jean-Philippe Rameau: Les fêtes d'Hébé (Les Arts Florissants & William Christie)- Erato, 1997
