= Fiona Kimm =

British opera singer

Fiona Kimm is a British mezzo-soprano known for a wide-ranging operatic and concert repertoire.

== Education and early career ==
She studied at the Royal College of Music with Meriel St Clair, and at the National Opera Studio in its inaugural year.

She made her operatic debut as Irene in "Tamerlano" for Musica Nel Chiostro at the Riverside Studios. Her Glyndebourne debut in 1978 was as 3rd Lady in Die Zauberflöte (in Southern Television's broadcast) and she was given the John Christie Award that year. She joined English National Opera North in 1979, making her debut as Hansel. She appeared with ENO as Fyodor in Boris Godunov in 1980, a role she repeated with the Royal Opera House in 1983.

== Operatic roles ==
=== UK ===
For Glyndebourne Festival and Touring Companies, she has sung 3rd Lady (debut), Celia (La Fedeltà Premiata), Sméraldine (L'Amour des Trois Oranges), Maman/Chatte (L'Enfant et les Sortilèges), Baba the Turk (The Rake's Progress), Sesto (La Clemenza di Tito) and Mme Larina (Eugene Onegin).

For English National Opera, roles include Fyodor, Siebel (Faust), Kitchen Boy (Rusalka), Sonya (War and Peace), Diana (Orpheus in the Underworld), Frou-Frou (La Belle Vivette) and Orlofsky (Die Fledermaus).

For Opera North, roles include Hansel (debut), Mercedes(Carmen), Rosalind (The Mines of Sulphur), Nicklaus (The Tales of Hoffmann), Julie (Showboat), Olga (Eugene Onegin), Baba the Turk and Maman/Tasse Chinoise/Libellule (L'Enfant et les Sortileges).

For Scottish Opera, roles include Clori (L'Egisto)(debut), Schoolboy (Lulu), Olga, Flosshilde (Das Rheingold), Meg (Falstaff), Marcellina (Figaro's Wedding) and Mrs Chin (A Night at the Chinese Opera).

For the Royal Opera House, she has sung Fyodor, Baronne (Chérubin), Comtesse de Coigny (Andrea Chenier), Herodias's Page (Salome).

For English Touring Opera, she has sung Jezibaba (Rusalka) and Kabanicha (Katya Kabanova).

For Garsington Opera she has sung Clairon (Capriccio) and Mistress Quickly (Falstaff) .

She has performed Fricka (Das Rheingold and Die Walküre) for Longborough Festival Opera.

She sang Rosa Mamai (L'Arlesiana) for Holland Park in the British professional premiere of Cilea's opera.

She sang Azucena (Il Trovatore) for Stowe Opera.

=== International ===
Her roles include Mme Arvidson (Un Ballo in Maschera) for Canadian Opera Company, Mrs Sedley (Peter Grimes) for Frankfurt Opera, The Nurse (Boris Godunov) and Jane's Mother (Snow White) for the Nationale Reisopera, Nancy (Albert Herring) and Electra (Visitations) for Opera Decentralisee and Ursule (Béatrice et Bénédict) for the Berlioz Festival in Lyon.

Amongst the conductors with whom she has sung are Claudio Abbado, Bernard Haitink, Edward Downes, Gennadi Rozhdestvensky, Mark Elder, Andrew Davis, Jacques Delacote, Nicola Luisotti and Vasily Petrenko.

== Concert repertoire ==
She has a wide-ranging concert and oratorio repertoire and has performed the major works in the UK and internationally. Performances include Margret (Wozzeck) with the Chicago Symphony Orchestra, Kindertotenlieder with the Singapore Symphony Orchestra, The Dream of Gerontius with City of Birmingham Symphony Orchestra, appearances at the 3 Choirs Festival, Cheltenham Festival, Proms and Huddersfield Festival, including Alfred Shnittke's Seid Wacht und Nuchtern, Stravinsky's Les Noces and Britten's Spring Symphony, the Verdi Requiem in Madrid and Vilnius, Luciano Berio's Folk Songs with the BBC Scottish Symphony Orchestra and Henze's Voices with the London Sinfonietta.

== Contemporary music ==
She is widely recognized for her dynamic performances of contemporary music, and has created roles in a number of world premieres, including Wife (Greek), Auntirosa (Baa-Baa Black Sheep), Marcolfa (The Nightingale's to Blame) and Ma (House of the Gods), as well as having several new works written specifically for her, including Gary Carpenter's "For Remembrance" and "The One Alone", with words by Dame Iris Murdoch, Edward Cowie's "Kate Kelly’s Road Show" and Turnage's "Songs From Greek". She has performed with top contemporary ensembles including London Sinfonietta, Ensemble Modern, Asko, Nash Ensemble and Lontano.

== Discography and video ==
Her recordings include Lament for a Hanging Man by Mark-Anthony Turnage, Canciones by Simon Holt, Street Scene by Kurt Weill, L'Enfance du Christ by Berlioz and Beatrice Cenci by Berthold Goldschmidt. Her recital CD, In Flanders Fields, is the first in a projected series focusing on Music and Conflict, and was the culmination of intensive research into the music and poetry of the First World War and the resulting Wigmore Hall recital with pianist Andrew Ball.

Her television and video appearances include Rusalka, L'Enfant et les Sortileges, Salome, Greek and Baa Baa Black Sheep.
