= Rory Mullarkey =

Irish playwright

Rory Mullarkey (born 1987) is an Irish playwright and librettist.

== Early life ==
Mullarkey was born in Pembroke, Ontario. He was raised in a military family and spent his childhood in Davenport and Bramhall, both in Greater Manchester. He attended Manchester Grammar School, then studied Russian at the University of Cambridge. He then began studying at the Russian State Institute of Performing Arts, but did not finish.

== Career ==
Mullarkey's first full play was Cannibals, which premiered at the Royal Exchange, Manchester, in 2013. It won the 2014 James Tait Black Memorial Prize for Drama.

In 2014, Mullarkey was awarded the Pinter Commission by the Royal Court Theatre. His The Wolf from the Door premiered at the Royal Court in the same year.

In 2017, Mullarkey's Saint George and the Dragon premiered at the National Theatre.

In 2018, Mullarkey's Pity premiered at the Royal Court Theatre. In the same year, he wrote the libretto for Mark-Anthony Turnage's Coraline, performed at the Barbican Centre, and for The Skating Rink, performed at Garsington Opera. He also translated Chekov's The Cherry Orchard into English for Michael Boyd's Bristol Old Vic run.

== Selected works ==
- Cannibals (Royal Exchange, Manchester, 2013)
- The Wolf from the Door (Royal Court Theatre, 2014)
- Each Slow Dusk (Pentabus), 2014)
- Saint George and the Dragon (National Theatre, 2017)
- Pity (Royal Court Theatre, 2018)

== Awards ==
- James Tait Black Memorial Prize for Drama 2014 – Cannibals
- Pinter Commission 2014
- George Devine award 2014 – co-winner with Alice Birch
