= Your Rockaby =

Musical Composition

- Soprano Saxophone Concerto by Mark-Anthony Turnage
- Composed: November 1992 – November 1993: Arsenal
- Performed: February 23, 1994, London
- Published: 1995, London
- Scoring: amplified soprano saxophone; orchestra

Your Rockaby is a concerto for soprano saxophone and orchestra written by the British composer Mark-Anthony Turnage. It was completed in 1993.

== Background ==
Your Rockaby was born after Turnage had spent some time in Tanglewood and as a composer-in-association at the CBSO. Even though he explored composing for the saxophone in his first opera, Greek, this was the first time Turnage wrote a concertante piece for saxophone. The concerto loosely bases its rhythmic structure on Samuel Beckett's play Rockaby. However, the link between these two works is only readily apparent thanks to their title. Since the piece is not scored for any voices, it includes no text from the play.

The concerto was a BBC commission, composed between November 1992 and November 1993, with a hiatus between February and September 1993. The work was completed in Arsenal. It was first performed on February 23, 1994, at the Royal Festival Hall in London, by Martin Robertson at the soprano saxophone and the BBC Symphony Orchestra conducted by Andrew Davis. The soloist saxophone part was specifically written for Robertson, who first became associated with Turnage in 1986 when he played Turnage's Sarabande for soprano saxophone and piano in his solo debut at the Purcell Room in London. It was published by Schott in 1995.

== Structure ==
Turnage himself described the concerto as "a journey through the flamboyant landscape of gaudy jazz figures, with the sax desperately clutching its melodic sanity". It is set in a single, 24-minute movement, even though there are some recognizable sections in it, e. g., an accompanied cadenza and a passacaglia entitled Lullaby for Charlie close to the end of the piece (Charlie is Martin Robertson's son). The lullaby is an instrumental setting of the first lines of the one-woman original play by Beckett.

It is scored for a solo soprano saxophone in B-flat with amplification, three flutes, two alto flutes, a piccolo, three oboes, two clarinets in B-flat, a bass clarinet, a contrabass clarinet in B-flat, two bassoons, a contrabassoon, four horns in F, three trumpets in C, two tenor trombones, a bass trombone, a tuba, a large percussion section for five percussionists (consisting of a brake drum, a large bass drum, a pedal bass drum, two bodhráns, a sizzle cymbal, a woodblock, a large whip, a large untuned gong, a xylophone, a marimba, a vibraphone, crotales, hand bells, tubular bells, tuned cow bells, a djembe, two darabukas (or two large bongos), and a large saucepan), a cimbalom, a large ratchet, a harp, a piano, a celesta, and a large string section (consisting of sixteen first violins, sixteen second violins, twelve violas, twelve cellos, and eight double basses).

The general tone of the composition is bluesy and dark, which is specified in the tempo markings used in the score and reinforced by the unusual percussion scoring of the piece, calling for bodhráns (Irish traditional drums), darabukas (drums from the Middle East and North Africa) and the djembe (from West Africa). This was also noted by Andrew Clements's original review in The Guardian which had the headline Lullaby in Black.

== Recordings ==
Despite its initial success, this piece has been performed very rarely. The only recording widely available is the authoritative version from the musicians who premiered the piece. It was recorded on November 25, 1995, at Abbey Road Studio No. 1. It was released on CD by both Argo and Decca.

== Reception ==
The album was shortlisted for the 1997 Mercury Music Prize, a prestigious award recognising the best British or Irish album of the year.
