= The Railway Children (opera) =

2025 opera by Mark-Anthony Turnage

- Opera by Mark-Anthony Turnage
- Librettist: Rachael Hewer
- Language: English
- Based on: The Railway Children by Edith Nesbit
- Premiere: October 31, 2025; Glyndebourne Opera House

The Railway Children is an English-language opera in two acts, with music by Mark-Anthony Turnage and libretto by Rachael Hewer. It is an adaption of the 1906 children's book of the same name by Edith Nesbit.

== Background and performance history ==
Nesbit's book, The Railway Children was published in 1906 and makes references to contemporary events such as the Russo-Japanese War. The opera moves the setting to the 1980s, with the plot having a Cold War background. Staging includes 1980s fashion and items such a Rubik's cube.

The Railway Children is Turnage's sixth stage opera. Among his previous operas are Anna Nicole and Festen. The libretto was adapted from Nesbit's book by Rachael Hewer.

The opera had its premiere performance on 31 October 2025 at Glyndebourne. The producer was Stephen Langridge, with staging by Nicky Shaw and lighting by Mark Jonathan. The conductor was Tim Anderson.

== Reception ==
Clive Paget of The Guardian, in a four star review, called The Railway Children "a commendable addition to the operatic canon". He referred to Hewer's libretto as "dramatically effective". On Turnage's score, Paget noted the use of railway noises and calls the score "energetic". He praised the cast, especially focusing on the singers performing as the three children.
