= Greek (opera) =

- Opera by Mark-Anthony Turnage
- Librettist: Turnage; Jonathan Moore
- Based on: Greek by Steven Berkoff
- Premiere: 17 June 1988; Gasteig, Munich

Greek is an opera in two acts composed by Mark-Anthony Turnage to a libretto adapted by Turnage and Jonathan Moore from Steven Berkoff's 1980 verse play Greek. The play and the opera are a re-telling of Sophocles's Greek tragedy Oedipus Rex with the setting changed to the East End of London in the 1980s. The opera was first performed on 17 June 1988 in the Carl-Orff-Saal of the Gasteig, Munich, in a co-production by the Munich Biennale, the Edinburgh International Festival and the BBC.

== Background and performance history ==
Turnage composed Greek between 1986 and 1988 as a commission from the City of Munich for one of five new operas to premiere at the first Munich Biennale. The commission was suggested by the Biennale's founder, German composer Hans Werner Henze, who had taught Turnage at the Tanglewood Music Center and admired his work. Turnage adapted Berkoff's play for the libretto with the help of Jonathan Moore who would be the stage director of the premiere production. The adaptation involved shortening the play, re-ordering some of its text, and the addition of a police riot scene not in Berkoff's original.

Sian Edwards conducted the world premiere of Greek on 17 June 1988 in the Carl-Orff-Saal of the Munich Gasteig. The production was directed by Jonathan Moore with sets and costumes by David Blight, and lighting by Kevin Sleep. Greek ran for two more performances at the Biennale on 18 and 19 June, and received its UK premiere the following month at the Edinburgh Festival. This production was revived two years later for performances at English National Opera. In 1990 the BBC filmed a television version of Greek at the Liverpool Warehouse with the original world premiere cast and the Almeida Ensemble. The production, directed by Peter Maniura and Jonathan Moore and conducted by Richard Bernas, won the Royal Philharmonic Society Award for Best Broadcast (Radio or Television).

The first fully staged production of Greek in Australia took place at the Chamber Made Theatre in Melbourne on 13 June 1991. That same year it premiered in Italy at the Montepulciano Festival on 1 August. Further national premieres followed in the second half of the 1990s: Netherlands (Stadsschouwburg, Amsterdam, 3 January 1996); Austria (Odeon, Vienna, 20 October 1996); and the United States (Aspen Music Festival, 23 July 1998. Among its 21st century performances in the UK were two tours by Music Theatre Wales in autumn 2011 (which included the Buxton Festival) and autumn 2013. In 2017 Edinburgh International Festival and Scottish Opera created a new production, performing in Edinburgh and Glasgow, as well as the opera's New York premiere at Brooklyn Academy of Music. The first staged performance to be seen in Chicago was produced by the Chicago Opera Vanguard company in May 2009.

== Roles and instrumentation ==
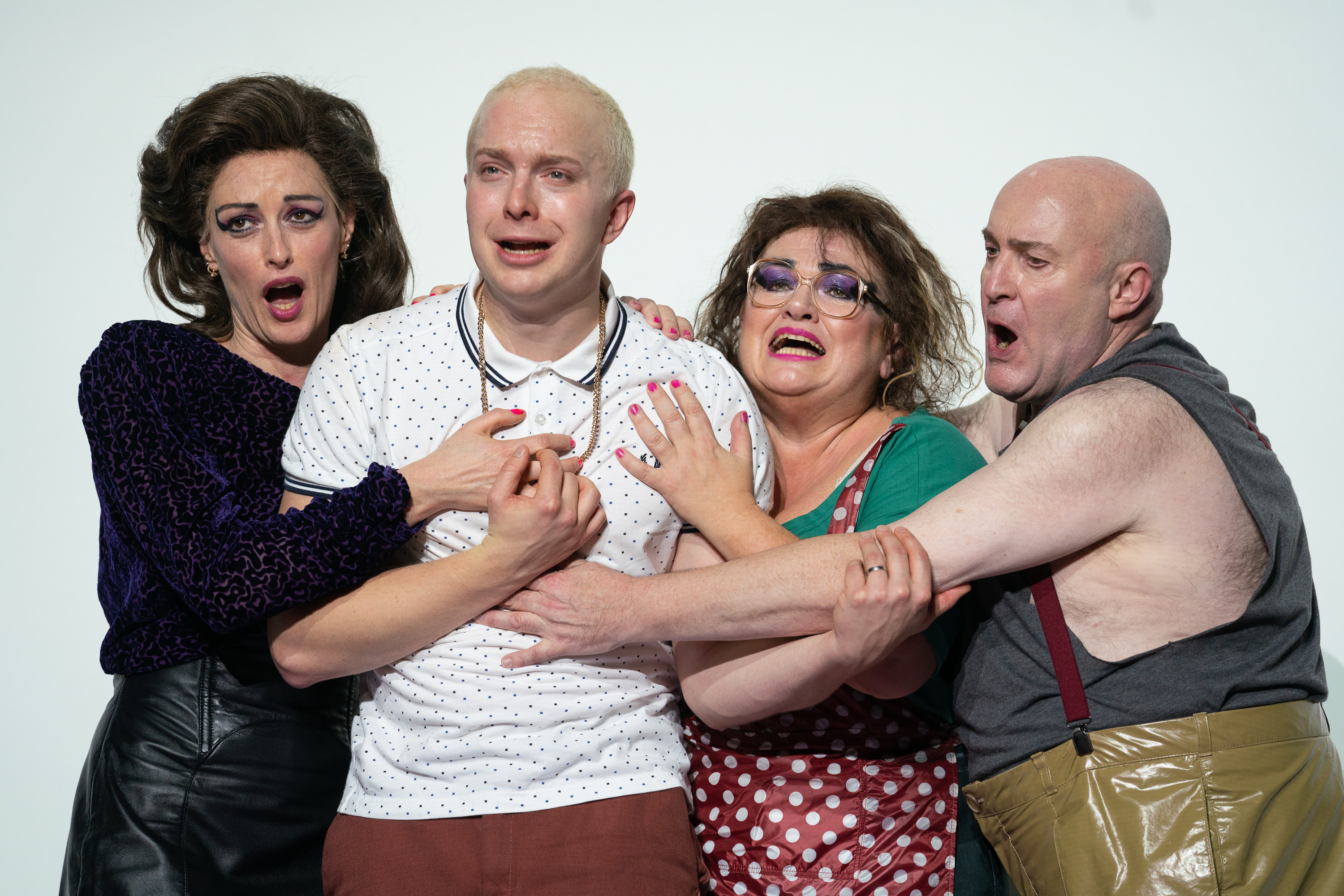
Scene from a 2018 production of Greek at the Brooklyn Academy of Music

The opera was written for a cast of four singers, sharing eleven roles:

Role	Voice type	Premier cast, 17 June 1988 (Conductor: Sian Edwards)
Eddy	high baritone	Quentin Hayes
Wife, Doreen, Sphinx II, Waitress I	mezzo-soprano	Fiona Kimm
Dad, Cafe Manager, Police Chief	baritone	Richard Suart
Mum, Sphinx I, Waitress II	soprano	Helen Charnock

The original productions of the play of the same name by Steven Berkoff on which the opera is based followed a similar division of roles:

- Eddy, Fortune-teller
- Dad, Manager of cafe
- Wife, Doreen, Waitress 1
- Mum, Sphinx, Waitress 2

In addition to the singers the opera also has roles for four actors with speaking parts.

The instrumental ensemble consists of:

- flute (doubling alto flute, piccolo)
- 2 oboes (both doubling cor anglais)
- 2 clarinets in B♭ (no. 1 doubling clarinet in E♭, bass clarinet, no. 2 doubling bass clarinet)
- soprano saxophone (doubling alto saxophone, baritone saxophone)
- trumpet in C
- trombone
- percussion (1 or 2 players)
- harp
- piano (doubling electronic piano)
- viola
- 3 cellos
- double bass

As well as their own instruments all of the players are required to play a varied selection of percussion instruments, such as bodhrán, tom-tom, ratchet, police whistle and large metal dustbin lid.

== Recording ==
A recording featuring the original cast conducted by Richard Bernas was released on the Argo Records label in 1994. It was re-released by Decca in 2002.

== Sources ==
- Berkoff, Steven (1989) [1980]. "Greek". Decadence and Other Plays. London: Faber and Faber. ISBN 0-571-14073-4.
- Ewans, Michael (2007). Opera from the Greek: Studies in the poetics of appropriation. Ashgate Publishing. ISBN 978-0-7546-6099-6.
- Johnson, Lawrence A. (3 June 2009). ""Greek is no classic, yet young company gives Turnage opera an energetic local premiere"". Chicago Classical Review.
- Münchener Biennale Archives, Greek, 1988
- Schott Music, Greek
- Stearns, David Patrick (22 July 1998). "Composer gets chance to be 'Greek' to U.S. audiences". USA Today – via pqarchiver.com. (subscription required)
