= Coraline (opera) =

Opera by Mark-Anthony Turnage

- Opera by Mark-Anthony Turnage
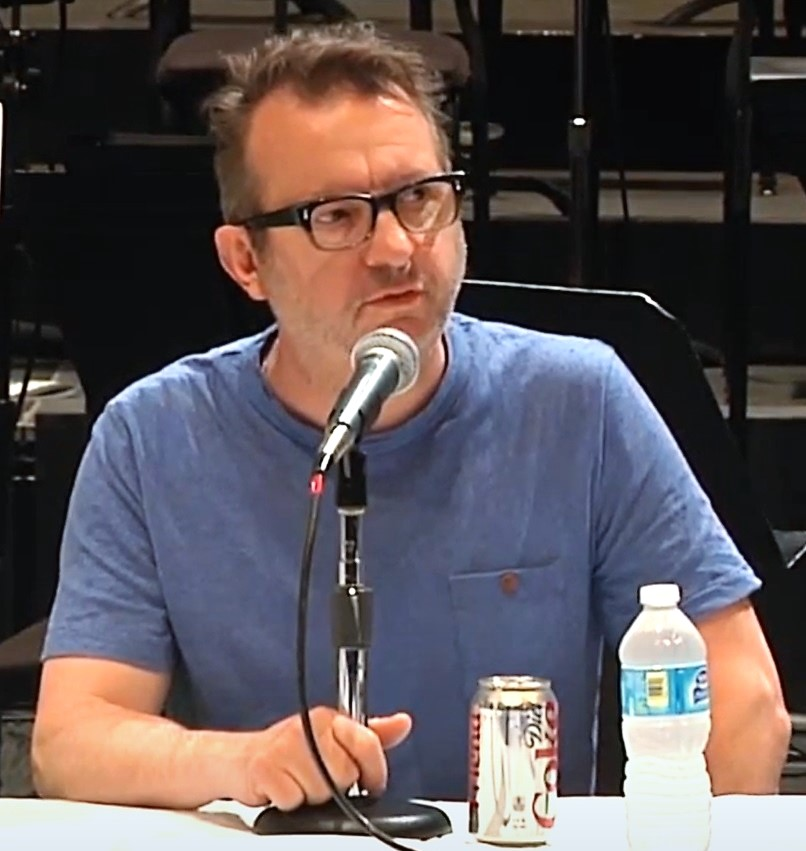
- Turnage in 2014
- Librettist: Rory Mullarkey
- Based on: Coraline by Neil Gaiman
- Premiere: 27 March 2018; Barbican Centre, London

Coraline is an opera in two acts by English composer Mark-Anthony Turnage, with a libretto by Rory Mullarkey. It is based on the 2002 dark fantasy children's novella by Neil Gaiman.

The opera had its world premiere at the Barbican Centre in London from 27 March to 7 April 2018, presented by the Barbican and produced by the Royal Opera House in a co-production with Folkoperan, Opéra de Lille, Theater Freiburg and Victorian Opera. The premiere was directed by Aletta Collins and conducted by Sian Edwards.

== Roles ==
Role	Voice type	Primere Cast
Coraline	Soprano	Mary Bevan
Mother / Other Mother	Mezzo-soprano	Kitty Whately
Father / Other Father	Baritone	Alexander Robin Baker
Mr. Bobo / Other Mr. Bobo	Tenor	Harry Nicoll
Miss Spink / Other Miss Spink	Soprano	Gillian Keith
Miss Forcible / Other Miss Forcible	Mezzo-soprano	Frances McCafferty
Ghost Child 1	Mezzo-soprano	Gillian Keith
Ghost Child 2	Tenor	Harry Nicoll
Ghost Child 3	Baritone	Dominic Sedgwick
