= The Silver Tassie (play) =

1928 anti-war play by Sean O'Casey

The Silver Tassie is a four-act Expressionist play about the First World War, written between 1927 and 1928 by the Irish playwright Seán O'Casey. It was O'Casey's fourth play and attacks imperialist wars and the suffering that they cause. O'Casey described the play as "A generous handful of stones, aimed indiscriminately, with the aim of breaking a few windows. I don't think it makes a good play, but it's a remarkable one."

== Plot ==
An antiwar play in four acts, focusing on Harry Heegan, a soldier who goes to war as if going to a football match.

- Act 1 : The opening presents Harry in the prime of life, as an athletic hero, but unaware of the possibilities and values of life.
- Act 2 is a sudden change of tempo, being an experiment with expressionist and symbolic theater. Set at the battlefront it unexpectedly concentrates on the cynicism and despair of the common soldier at the front lines.
- Act 3 portrays the bitterness of the veterans in a veterans’ hospital
- Act 4 contrasts the grim plight of the disabled Harry Heegan with the vitality of those who were not combatants and have normal lives and futures to anticipate.

The play's study of Harry’s loss of many of his life’s hopes during and after the war marks it as unusual.

== Production history ==
In 1928, W. B. Yeats rejected the play for the Abbey Theatre in Dublin. It premièred at the Apollo Theatre in the West End of London on 11 October 1929. It was directed by Raymond Massey and starred Charles Laughton and Barry Fitzgerald. The set design for act two was by Augustus John. It ran for twenty-six performances. George Bernard Shaw and Lady Gregory were both great admirers of the production.

Its Irish première was on 12 August 1935 at the Abbey Theatre, directed by Arthur Shields, though it ran for only five performances. Despite being popular, the controversy it caused led to O'Casey's permanent departure from Ireland.

The first major production in England was by the RSC at the Aldwych Theatre, London, directed by David Jones, which opened on 10 September 1969 with Richard Moore as Harry Heegan.

More recent productions include a 1990 production at the Abbey Theatre directed by Patrick Mason, a 1995 production at the Almeida Theatre, a 2010 tour of Ireland (along with performances in The Lowry in Manchester and the Oxford Playhouse) by the Druid Theatre Company. and a 2014 production at London's National Theatre.

== Adaptations ==
Mark Anthony Turnage adapted the play as an opera under the same title in 1999.

The Druid Theatre Company adapted the play as part of the 2010 Dublin Theatre Festival starring Aaron Monaghan as Harry Heegan.

== See also ==
- List of plays with anti-war themes

== Sources ==
- Quinn, Edward. 2006. A Dictionary of Literary and Thematic Terms. 2nd, rev. ed. New York: Facts on File. ISBN 978-0-8160-6243-0.
