= The Silver Tassie (opera) =

- Opera by Mark-Anthony Turnage
- Librettist: Amanda Holden
- Based on: The Silver Tassie by Seán O'Casey
- Premiere: 16 February 2000; English National Opera, London

The Silver Tassie is an opera in four acts by the English composer Mark-Anthony Turnage. The English libretto was written by Amanda Holden based on the 1927/28 play of the same name by Seán O'Casey. The opera was composed between 1997 and 1999.

== Background ==
The Silver Tassie was commissioned by English National Opera (ENO) while Turnage was their Composer in Association and benefited from being worked on at the ENO Studio. It was part funded by Dallas Opera.

In an interview for the programme for the ENO production, Turnage talks about treating the four acts as the movements of a symphony with a dance finale. He also discusses how the studio workshops helped him thin out the orchestral textures to make the voices clearer. Although the libretto leaves things vague, Turnage makes it clear that he had a Dublin setting in mind with references in the last act to an Irish jig as one of the dance movements and the use of fiddles in the off-stage band. Turnage includes references to dance and other music contemporary to the setting in his score. In particular, he quotes the Robert Burns folk-song from which the opera gets its name.

== Performance and recording history ==
The Silver Tassie was first performed on 16 February 2000 by ENO at the London Coliseum Theatre. The opera won the South Bank Show Award and Laurence Olivier Awards for its original ENO run. ENO have released a live recording of the original cast. This production was broadcast on BBC television and radio and the film was shown at a Turnage weekend at the Barbican Centre organised with the BBC. The production was revived with a different cast in 2002.

Performances of The Silver Tassie were given in Dublin during 2001 by Opera Ireland.

The opera was due to receive its North American premiere by Dallas Opera in 2003 but this was cancelled "due to financial considerations and political sensitivities in the wake of the September 11 attacks on the World Trade Center."

== Roles ==
| Role | Voice type | Premiere cast, 16 February 2000 Conductor: Paul Daniel |
|---|---|---|
| Harry Heegan (23) | heroic baritone | Gerald Finley |
| Susie (22), the girl next door | soprano | Sarah Connolly |
| Mrs Foran (29), neighbour | dramatic soprano | Vivian Tierney |
| Teddy (31), her husband | baritone | David Kempster |
| Barney (23), Harry's best friend | bass-baritone | Leslie John Flanagan |
| Jessie Tate (22), Harry's girlfriend | high soprano | Mary Hegarty |
| Mrs Heegan (66), Harry's mother | mezzo-soprano | Anne Howells |
| Sylvester (65), Harry's father | tenor | John Graham-Hall |
| Dr Maxwell (30) | tenor | Mark Le Brocq |
| The croucher | basso profundo (can be off-stage) | Gwynne Howell |
| Staff officer | tenor | Bradley Daley |
| Corporal | baritone | Jozik Koc |
| Stretcher-bearers | boys' chorus (trebles) | boys' chorus (trebles) |
| Volunteer soldiers | men's chorus I (tenors, basses), men's chorus II (tenors, basses) | |
Casualties on stretchers (act 2), male patients in hospital beds (act 3), dancers; soldiers on leave and their girlfriends; local people (act 4) (silent)

== Synopsis ==
The opera is set during the First World War in a town somewhere in Britain. There are interludes linking the first two acts and also the last two acts.

=== Act 1 ===
An Autumn evening in the Heegan family home

Harry's parents and neighbours are waiting for him to come home to collect his equipment before returning to the front. Sylvester reminisces about Harry's sporting prowess and how he knocked out a police officer; Susie is preaching to him about the day of judgment; Mrs Heegan is waiting out in the cold. They hear the noise of Mrs Foran being attacked by her violent husband, Teddy. She takes refuge with the Heegans. Teddy comes in and smashes his wife's wedding bowl. He is angry that she was happier when he was away at the war. Harry arrives with Barney and Jessie. He is carrying a sports trophy – the Silver Tassie of the title. He and Barney talk about Harry's winning goal. Harry, Barnie and Teddy leave for the troopship to take them back to the war.

=== Act 2 ===
The trenches

The Croucher is prophesying doom, misquoting the Old Testament. Some weary soldiers are taking it easy when a staff officer arrives and complains. He visits the Red Cross station and complains how negative the doctors are. Stretcher-bearers pass carrying wounded to the station. Then the corporal hands out parcels: a bible and a football. The soldiers start a game but the officer returns saying the enemy have broken through. He sends the soldiers back to battle.

=== Act 3 ===
A hospital ward in Britain

Harry is in a wheelchair, paralysed from the waist down. Susie is now a nurse. Their conversation drifts between first names and formal titles ("Nurse", (Patient) Number 28"). He is due an operation the next day. He is angry with the doctor's attitude. Visitors arrive: Harry's parents and Mrs Foran leading the now-blind Teddy. Jessie is outside, choosing to talk with Barney, now awarded the Victoria Cross for saving Harry. Harry calls for her. Eventually Barney arrives alone with flowers from Jessie and Harry's ukulele.

=== Act 4 ===
A dance at the football club

Jessie and Barney are trying to avoid Harry who is following them in his wheelchair. His mother is watching him. The Forans and the Heegans comment critically on Susie dancing with Dr Maxwell and on Jessie's and Barney's "immodesty". Teddy is not sure who they're talking about. Harry faints and is tended by Maxwell. When he comes round, Harry has a drink poured for him in the Silver Tassie. Susie encourages him out to play the ukulele and sing in the garden. Barney and Jessie lock the door and start to kiss and to undress just where Harry and Jessie used to have sex. Harry forces his way in and angrily recalls Barney's words when he saved Harry that he should live for Jessie's sake. Barney pulls Harry out of the wheelchair and they fight on the floor. The fight is broken up and Maxwell tells the Heegans to take Harry home. Harry hurls the Tassie to the ground. The Heegans leave, Sylvester pushing the chair and guiding Teddy. Jessie, Susie, Maxwell and Barney return to the dance.

== Reception ==
In 2018, Tim Ashley described The Silver Lassie as “arguably Turnage’s masterpiece”.
