= Mark-Anthony Turnage =

English composer (born 1960)

Mark-Anthony Turnage CBE
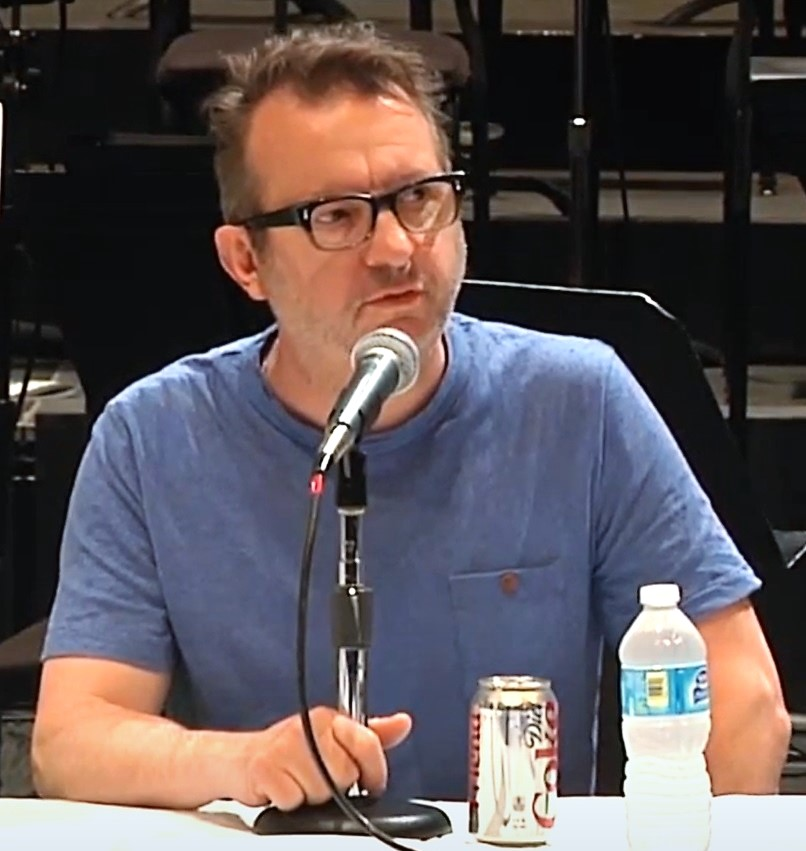
- Turnage speaks at the 2014 Cabrillo Festival of Contemporary Music
- Born: 10 June 1960 (age 66); Corringham, Essex, England
- Education: Royal College of Music
- Occupation: Composer

Mark-Anthony Turnage (born 10 June 1960) is an English composer of contemporary classical music.

== Life and career ==
Mark-Anthony Turnage was born in Corringham, Essex on 10 June 1960. Turnage was the eldest of three children. His parents were lovers of classical music and were enthusiastic Pentecostal Christians.

He began composing at age nine and at fourteen began studying at the junior section of the Royal College of Music.

His initial musical studies were with Oliver Knussen, John Lambert, and later with Gunther Schuller. He also has been strongly influenced by jazz, in particular by the work of Miles Davis, and has composed works featuring jazz performers, including John Scofield, Peter Erskine, John Patitucci, and Joe Lovano.

Turnage has composed numerous orchestral and chamber works, and three full-length operas. Greek, composed with the encouragement of Hans Werner Henze and first performed in 1988 at the Munich Biennale, is based on Steven Berkoff's adaptation of Oedipus Rex. The Silver Tassie, first performed in 2000, is based on the play by Seán O'Casey. Anna Nicole, with a libretto by Richard Thomas and first performed in 2011, relates the rise and fall of Playboy model and media celebrity Anna Nicole Smith. His opera for family audiences, Coraline, is based on the dark fantasy novel by Neil Gaiman, and was staged by The Royal Opera at the Barbican Theatre in 2018. His operas have been performed around the world including notably by New York City Opera (2013), Opernhaus Zurich (2019), Theater Dortmund (2013), Theater Freiburg (2018) and the Opera de Lille (2018).

Other works include Three Screaming Popes (after the paintings by Francis Bacon), Your Rockaby (a concerto for saxophone and orchestra), Yet Another Set To (a concerto for trombone and orchestra, dedicated to Christian Lindberg), and From the Wreckage (a concerto for trumpet and orchestra, written for Håkan Hardenberger). Blood on the Floor (1993–1996), for jazz quartet and large ensemble, contains nine sections with a shared theme of drug addiction, the section titled "Elegy for Andy" being a lament for the loss of his brother in a drug-related death.

More recent Turnage scores have included the orchestral work Remembering, conducted by Simon Rattle in 2017 with the London Symphony Orchestra and Berlin Philharmonic; double violin concerto Shadow Walker for soloists Vadim Repin and Daniel Hope, performed by the Borusan Istanbul Philharmonic Orchestra in 2018; and Testament (2018), his setting of Ukrainian texts for soprano and orchestra. He has composed song cycles for a number of celebrated singers including Sarah Connolly, Gerald Finley and Allan Clayton.

Turnage's work Blood on the Floor was choreographed by Wayne McGregor for Paris Opera Ballet in 2011 and in the same year he composed the score for Undance, collaborating with McGregor and visual artist Mark Wallinger. In 2012 Trespass, a ballet choreographed by Christopher Wheeldon and Alistair Marriott with score by Turnage, was first performed by The Royal Ballet. In 2017 he composed the score for Strapless, choreographed by Christopher Wheeldon for The Royal Ballet. Other choreographers that have made ballets to Turnage's works include Heinz Spoerli (Zurich Ballet 2007 and Staatsballet Berlin 2012), Ashley Page (Rambert Dance Company 2013), Jorma Elo (Hubbard Street Dance Chicago 2007) and Gregor Zollig (Tanztheater Bielefeld 2006).

Turnage was the first Radcliffe Composer in Association with the City of Birmingham Symphony Orchestra from 1989 until 1993 and between 2000 and 2003 was the BBC Symphony Orchestra's first Associate Composer. He was Composer in Residence with the London Philharmonic Orchestra from 2005 until 2010. Between 2006 and 2010, Turnage was a co-composer-in-residence of the Chicago Symphony Orchestra, a position he held alongside Argentinian composer Osvaldo Golijov.

In autumn 2005 he was appointed the Royal College of Music's Research Fellow in Composition. In 2015 he was appointed a Commander of the Order of the British Empire (CBE) for his services to music.

== Personal life ==
His partner is the director Rachael Hewer, who founded the Virtual Opera Project (VOPERA) in 2020.

In January 2025 Turnage was the castaway for BBC Radio 4's Desert Island Discs, where his choices included "Notre Dame des Jouets" by Oliver Knussen, "Blue in Green" by Miles Davis and "Living for the City" by Stevie Wonder. In the same programme he spoke about volunteering regularly at a food bank, and about working on music projects with prisoners.

== Works ==
=== Opera ===
Title	Genre	Subdivisions	Libretto	Premiere	Theatre
Greek	opera	2 acts, 90 min	the composer and Jonathan Moore, after the play by Steven Berkoff	17 June 1988	Munich Biennale
Twice Through the Heart	dramatic scena	3 parts, 30 min	Jackie Kay	16 June 1997	Aldeburgh Festival
Country of the Blind	chamber opera			16 June 1997	Aldeburgh Festival
The Silver Tassie	opera	4 acts, 120 min	Amanda Holden, after the play by Seán O'Casey	16 February 2000	English National Opera
Anna Nicole	opera	2 acts, 120 min	Richard Thomas	17 February 2011	Royal Opera House, London
Coraline	opera	2 acts	Rory Mullarkey after the novella by Neil Gaiman	27 March 2018	Barbican Centre, London
Festen	opera	90 min	Lee Hall, after the movie by Thomas Vinterbeg	11 February 2025	Royal Opera House, London
The Railway Children	opera	2 acts, 100 min	Rachael Hewer, after the novel by E. Nesbit	30 October 2025	Glyndebourne Autumn Season

=== Ballet ===
- From All Sides (2005–06)
- L'Anatomie De La Sensation (2011)
- Undance (2011)
- Trespass (2012)
- Strapless (2016 revised 2017)

=== Orchestral ===
- Night Dances (1981), for offstage string quintet, solo instrumental group and orchestra
- Three Screaming Popes (1988–89)
- Some Days (1989), song cycle for mezzo-soprano and orchestra
- Momentum (1990–1991)
- Drowned Out (1992–1993)
- Your Rockaby (1992–93), for soprano saxophone and orchestra
- Dispelling the Fears (1993–1994, rev. 1995), for two trumpets and orchestra
- Scorched (1996–2001), for jazz trio and orchestra
- Still Sleeping (1997)
- Evening Songs (1998)
- Silent Cities (1998)
- About Time (1999–2000), for ensemble and chamber orchestra of period instruments
- Another Set To (1999–2000), concerto for trombone and orchestra
- A Quick Blast (2000), for orchestral winds, brass and percussion
- Dark Crossing (2000), for chamber orchestra
- Etudes and Elegies (2000–2002)
- Four-Horned Fandango (2000), for four horns and orchestra
- On Opened Ground (2000–2001), concerto for viola and orchestra
- Uninterrupted Sorrow (2000–2001)
- Fractured Lines (2001), double concerto for two percussion and orchestra
- When I Woke (2001), for baritone and chamber orchestra
- A Quiet Life (2002), for string orchestra
- A Man Descending (2003), for tenor saxophone and chamber orchestra
- Riffs and Refrains (2003), concerto for clarinet and orchestra
- Scherzoid (2003–04)
- A Soothing Interlude (2004), for trombone and orchestra
- From the Wreckage (2004), concerto for trumpet and orchestra
- Yet Another Set To (2004), concerto for trombone and orchestra
- Ceres (2005)
- Hidden Love Song (2005), for soprano saxophone and chamber orchestra
- Juno (2005)
- Lullaby for Hans (2005), for string orchestra
- Three Asteroids (2005)
- The Torino Scale (2005)
- From All Sides (2005–06)
- A Prayer Out of Stillness (2007), concertante for double bass (doubling bass guitar) and string orchestra
- Chicago Remains (2007)
- Five Views of a Mouth (2007), concerto for flute and orchestra
- Mambo, Blues and Tarantella (2007), concerto for violin and orchestra
- Texan Tenebrae (2009)
- Hammered Out (2010)
- Cello Concerto (2010)
- Speranza (2011–12)
- Canon Fever (2012), premiered at the opening night of the 2012 BBC Proms.
- Frieze (2013) BBC co-commission with the Royal Philharmonic Society and the New York Philharmonic
- Erskine (2013), concerto for drum set and orchestra
- Passchendaele (2013)
- Piano Concerto (2013)
- Dialogue (2014), for violin and cello soloists, strings, percussion, harp and piano
- Håkan (2014), for trumpet and orchestra
- Martland Memorial (2014–15), for percussion and orchestra
- Remembering (2016), for orchestra
- Shadow Walker (2017), double concerto for two violins and orchestra
- Symphonic Movements (2017), for orchestra
- Towards Alba (2017–18), for horn and orchestra
- Time Flies (2019), for orchestra
- Go For It (2019), for orchestra
- Last Song for Olly (reduced version) (2018 arr.2020), reduced version for orchestra
- Up for Grabs (2020), for jazz trio and orchestra
- Cortege for Bernard Haitink (2021), for orchestra

=== Choral ===
- The Game Is Over (2001–2002), for S.A.T.B. choir and orchestra
- A Relic of Memory (2003), for S.A.T.B. choir and orchestra
- Calmo (2003), for a cappella S.A.T.B. choir and bells
- Two Fanfares and a Lament (2003), for S.A.T.B. choir and large ensemble
- Christmas Night (2006), for S.A.T.B. choir and piano
- Claremont Carol (2006), for upper-voice choir and piano or organ
- Miserere Nobis (2006), for a cappella S.A.T.B. choir
- At Sixes and Sevens (2012), for soprano and baritone soloists, youth chorus and chamber orchestra
- Hibiki (2014), for two solo voices, children's chorus and orchestra (world premiere: Tokyo, 11 December 2016; European premiere: London, BBC Proms, 14 August 2017)
- Sing Out Loud (2017), two Welsh part songs for a cappella male chorus

=== Chamber ===
- On All Fours (1985), for chamber ensemble
- Sarabande (1986), for soprano saxophone and piano
- Release (1987), for soprano saxophone, alto saxophone, bass clarinet, trumpet, trombone, percussion, piano and double bass
- Kai (1989–1990), for cello solo and ensemble
- Three Farewells (1989–1990), for flute, bass clarinet, harp and string quartet
- Set To (1992–1993), for brass dectet
- This Silence (1992–1993), for clarinet, bassoon, horn and string quintet
- Blood on the Floor (1993–1996), for jazz quartet and large ensemble
- Barrie's Deviant Fantasy (1995), for string quartet and referee's whistles
- Bass Invention (1999–2000), for double bass solo and ensemble
- Cantilena (2001), for oboe quintet
- Snapshots (2002), for large ensemble
- Crying Out Loud (2003), for large ensemble
- A Short Procession (2003), for piano trio
- Eulogy (2003), for viola solo and small ensemble
- No Let Up (2003), for ensemble
- Three Trios (2003–05), for piano trio
- Carnac (2004), for B♭ Clarinet and piano
- A Few Serenades (2004), for cello and piano
- A Slow Pavane (2004–2005), for piano trio
- A Fast Stomp (2005), for piano trio
- Bleak Moments (2005), for horn and string quartet
- Fanfare (from all sides) (2006), for brass ensemble
- Returning (2006), for string sextet
- Tango (2007), for ensemble
- Out of Black Dust (2007–08), for brass ensemble
- Four Chants (2008), for violin and piano
- Twisted Blues with Twisted Ballad (2008) (aka String Quartet No 1)
- Grazioso! (2009), for small ensemble
- Five Processionals (2009), for clarinet, violin, cello and piano
- Hilary's Hoedown (2009) encore for violin and piano
- GG (2010), for cello and percussion
- Three for Two (2010), for piano quartet
- Amelia's March (2010), for small ensemble
- Silem (2010), for solo trumpet and big band
- Undance (2011), for ensemble
- Johnston (2011), for two cellos
- Falling Apart (2012), for clarinet and piano
- Contusion (2013) (aka String Quartet No 2)
- Run Riot (2013), for saxophone quartet
- Power Play (2014), for viola and piano
- Maya (2014), for solo cello and chamber orchestra
- Duetti d'Amore (2015), for violin and cello
- Shroud (2016) (aka String Quartet No 3)
- Seven Pint-Sized Pieces (2016), for violin and piano
- Prussian Blue (2016), Quintet for piano, violin, viola, cello and double bass
- Cleethorpes Chorale (2017), for solo violin and piano
- Massarosa (2018), for bassoon quintet
- Nocturne (2018), for trumpet and strings
- Romanian Rhapsody (2018), for solo violin and ensemble
- Lament (2018–19), for solo violin and string orchestra
- A Furious Fanfare (2019), for trumpet, horn, trombone and percussion
- Winter's Edge (2019) (aka String Quartet No 4)
- Chorale (2020), for flute, bass clarinet, viola and cello
- Split Apart (2020), for string quartet
- Uli (2021), for eight players

=== Vocal ===
- Lament for a Hanging Man (1983), for soprano and ensemble
- Some Days (1989), song cycle for mezzo-soprano and orchestra
- Greek Suite (1989), for mezzo-soprano, tenor soli and ensemble
- The Torn Fields (2000–2002), song cycle for baritone and large ensemble
- When I Woke (2001), song cycle for baritone and orchestra
- Two Baudelaire Songs (2003–04), for soprano and ensemble
- About Water (2006), for solo jazz singer; soprano, mezzo-soprano, tenor, bass soli; solo instrumental septet and large ensemble
- A Constant Obsession (2007), song cycle for tenor and ensemble
- Bellamy (2008), for countertenor and singing harpist
- In The Bleak Mid-Winter (arr. 2010) arranged for voice, harp, cello and double bass
- Testament (2017), cantata for solo soprano and orchestra
- Refugee (2018), for tenor and chamber orchestra
- Black Milk (2019), for jazz singer and sixteen players
- Owl Songs (2019), for soprano and eight players
- Without Ceremony (2019), for baritone and piano
- Of Nature's Light (2020), song cycle for mezzo-soprano and piano
- Silenced (2020), for tenor and piano
- Songs of Sleep and Regret (2020), for mezzo-soprano and piano

=== Solo instrumental ===
- True Life Stories (1995–1999), for piano
- An Aria (with Dancing) (2004), for trumpet
- Ah, Quegli Occhi! (2006), for soprano saxophone
- Air with Variations (2007), for guitar
- Cradle Song (2009), for clarinet
- Milo (2009), for cello
- Leap (2010), for clarinet
- Four Meditations (2018), for harp
- On Marylebone Road (2019) for piano

=== Other ===
- Anthem by Peter Erskine, ed. Turnage (1996), for jazz trio and chamber orchestra
- On the CD Music to Hear (Black Box, BBM 1065, 2001):
  - Two Memorials (1997–2001)
  - An Invention on "Solitude" (1997–98, rev. 1999)
  - Sleep On (1992)
  - Cortège for Chris (1997)
  - Two Elegies Framing a Shout (1994)
  - Three Farewells (1990)
  - Tune for Toru (1995–1999)
