= 2025 Laurence Olivier Awards =

2025 edition of the annual UK theatre awards

- Date: 6 April 2025
- Location: Royal Albert Hall
- Hosted by: Beverley Knight; Billy Porter
- Most wins: The Curious Case of Benjamin Button, Fiddler on the Roof and Giant (3)
- Most nominations: Fiddler on the Roof (13)

Television/radio coverage
- Network: ITV1 (television); Magic (radio)

The 2025 Laurence Olivier Awards were held on 6 April 2025 at the Royal Albert Hall. It recognized excellence in professional theatre in London, as determined by the Society of London Theatre. American actor Billy Porter and Olivier award-winning British singer and actress Beverley Knight hosted the ceremony for the first time, with Meera Syal providing voice over. The nominations were announced on 5 March 2025, with the Regent's Park Open Air Theatre production of Fiddler on the Roof receiving the most nominations with thirteen, equalling Hamilton from the 2018 awards. Fiddler on the Roof, Giant, and The Curious Case of Benjamin Button won the most awards at the ceremony, with three each respectively.

== Event calendar ==
- 23 June 2024: Ceremony date set for 6 April 2025 and venue confirmed as Royal Albert Hall.
- 10 February 2025: Beverley Knight and Billy Porter announced as hosts.
- 14 February 2025: Eligibility cut-off.
- 27 February 2025: Industry Recognition Award recipients announced.
- 5 March 2025: Nominations announced by Tom Francis and Nicole Scherzinger.
- 19 March 2025: Special Award recipient announced.
- 6 April 2025: Award ceremony scheduled.

== Eligibility ==
The Olivier Awards eligibility cut-off date for the 2024–25 season was 14 February 2025 for all London productions which meet all other eligibility requirements.

== Winners and nominees ==
The nominations were announced in 26 categories on 4 March 2025.

Best New Play	Best New Musical
Giant by Mark Rosenblatt – Jerwood Downstairs, Royal Court; The Fear of 13 by Lindsey Ferrentino (based on original film by David Sington) – Donmar Warehouse; Kyoto by Joe Murphy and Joe Robertson – @sohoplace; Shifters by Benedict Lombe – Duke of York's Theatre; The Years adapted by Eline Arbo and translated by Stephanie Bain (based on original text by Annie Ernaux) – Almeida Theatre and Harold Pinter Theatre	The Curious Case of Benjamin Button – Ambassadors Theatre; MJ the Musical – Prince Edward Theatre; Natasha, Pierre and the Great Comet of 1812 – Donmar Warehouse; Why Am I So Single? – Garrick Theatre
Best Revival	Best Musical Revival
Oedipus – Wyndham's Theatre; The Importance of Being Earnest – National Theatre Lyttelton; Machinal – The Old Vic; Waiting for Godot – Theatre Royal Haymarket	Fiddler on the Roof – Regent's Park Open Air Theatre; Hello, Dolly! – London Palladium; Oliver! – Gielgud Theatre; Starlight Express – Troubadour Wembley Park Theatre
Best Entertainment or Comedy Play	Best Family Show
Titanique by Tye Blue, Marla Mindelle and Constantine Rousouli (based on original text by James Cameron) – Criterion Theatre; Ballet Shoes adapted by Kendall Feaver (based on original text by Noel Streatfeild) – National Theatre Olivier; Inside No. 9 Stage/Fright by Steve Pemberton and Reece Shearsmith – Wyndham's Theatre; Spirited Away adapted by John Caird and co-adapted by Maoko Imai (based on original text by Hayao Miyazaki) – London Coliseum	Brainiac Live – Marylebone Theatre; Maddie Moate's Very Curious Christmas – Apollo Theatre; The Nutcracker – Polka Theatre; Rough Magic – Sam Wanamaker Playhouse at Globe Theatre
Best Actor	Best Actress
John Lithgow as Roald Dahl in Giant – Jerwood Downstairs, Royal Court; Adrien Brody as Nick Yarris in The Fear of 13 – Donmar Warehouse; Billy Crudup as Harry Clarke in Harry Clarke – Ambassadors Theatre; Paapa Essiedu as Delroy in Death of England: Delroy – @sohoplace; Mark Strong as Oedipus in Oedipus – Wyndham's Theatre	Lesley Manville as Jocasta in Oedipus – Wyndham's Theatre; Heather Agyepong as Des in Shifters – Duke of York's Theatre; Rosie Sheehy as Young Woman in Machinal – The Old Vic; Meera Syal as Queenie in A Tupperware of Ashes – National Theatre Dorfman; Indira Varma as Jocasta in Oedipus – The Old Vic
Best Actor in a Musical	Best Actress in a Musical
John Dagleish as Benjamin Button in The Curious Case of Benjamin Button – Ambassadors Theatre; Adam Dannheisser as Tevye in Fiddler on the Roof – Regent's Park Open Air Theatre; Myles Frost as Michael Jackson in MJ the Musical – Prince Edward Theatre; Simon Lipkin as Fagin in Oliver! – Gielgud Theatre; Jamie Muscato as Anatole Kuragin in Natasha, Pierre and the Great Comet of 1812 – Donmar Warehouse	Imelda Staunton as Dolly Gallagher Levi in Hello, Dolly! – London Palladium; Chumisa Dornford-May as Natasha Rostova in Natasha, Pierre and the Great Comet of 1812 – Donmar Warehouse; Lauren Drew as Céline Dion in Titanique – Criterion Theatre; Clare Foster as Elowen Keene in The Curious Case of Benjamin Button – Ambassadors Theatre; Lara Pulver as Golde in Fiddler on the Roof – Regent's Park Open Air Theatre
Best Actor in a Supporting Role	Best Actress in a Supporting Role
Elliot Levey as Tom Maschler in Giant – Jerwood Downstairs, Royal Court; Jorge Bosch as Raúl Estrada-Oyuela in Kyoto – @sohoplace; Tom Edden as Lucky in Waiting for Godot – Theatre Royal Haymarket; Ben Whishaw as Actor in Bluets – Jerwood Downstairs, Royal Court	Romola Garai as Annie in The Years – Almeida Theatre and Harold Pinter Theatre; Sharon D. Clarke as Lady Bracknell in The Importance of Being Earnest – National Theatre Lyttelton; Romola Garai as Jessie Stone in Giant – Jerwood Downstairs, Royal Court; Gina McKee as Annie in The Years – Almeida Theatre and Harold Pinter Theatre
Best Actor in a Supporting Role in a Musical	Best Actress in a Supporting Role in a Musical
Layton Williams as The Iceberg in Titanique – Criterion Theatre; Andy Nyman as Horace Vandergelder in Hello, Dolly! – London Palladium; Raphael Papo as The Fiddler in Fiddler on the Roof – Regent's Park Open Air Theatre; Tom Xander as Damian Hubbard in Mean Girls – Savoy Theatre	Maimuna Memon as Sonya Rostova in Natasha, Pierre and the Great Comet of 1812 – Donmar Warehouse; Liv Andrusier as Tzeitel in Fiddler on the Roof – Regent's Park Open Air Theatre; Amy Di Bartolomeo as Emily Charlton in The Devil Wears Prada – Dominion Theatre; Beverley Klein as Yente in Fiddler on the Roof – Regent's Park Open Air Theatre
Best Director	Best Theatre Choreographer
Eline Arbo for The Years – Almeida Theatre and Harold Pinter Theatre; Jordan Fein for Fiddler on the Roof – Regent's Park Open Air Theatre; Nicholas Hytner for Giant – Jerwood Downstairs, Royal Court; Robert Icke for Oedipus – Wyndham's Theatre	Christopher Wheeldon for MJ the Musical – Prince Edward Theatre; Matthew Bourne for Oliver! – Gielgud Theatre; Julia Cheng for Fiddler on the Roof – Regent's Park Open Air Theatre; Hofesh Shechter for Oedipus – The Old Vic
Best Set Design	Best Costume Design
Tom Scutt for scenic designing Fiddler on the Roof – Regent's Park Open Air Theatre; Daisy Beattie and Toby Olié for puppetry designing, Jon Bausor for scenic designing and Satoshi Kuriyama for production designing Spirited Away – London Coliseum; Frankie Bradshaw for scenic designing Ballet Shoes – National Theatre Olivier; Es Devlin for scenic designing Coriolanus – National Theatre Olivier	Gabriella Slade for Starlight Express – Troubadour Wembley Park Theatre; Hugh Durrant for Robin Hood – London Palladium; Sachiko Nakahara for Spirited Away – London Coliseum; Tom Scutt for Fiddler on the Roof – Regent's Park Open Air Theatre
Best Lighting Design	Best Sound Design
Paule Constable and Ben Jacobs for Oliver! – Gielgud Theatre; Howard Hudson for Natasha, Pierre and the Great Comet of 1812 – Donmar Warehouse; Howard Hudson for Starlight Express – Troubadour Wembley Park Theatre; Aideen Malone for Fiddler on the Roof – Regent's Park Open Air Theatre	Nick Lidster for Fiddler on the Roof – Regent's Park Open Air Theatre; Christopher Shutt for Oedipus – The Old Vic; Thijs van Vuure for The Years – Almeida Theatre and Harold Pinter Theatre; Koichi Yamamoto for Spirited Away – London Coliseum
Outstanding Musical Contribution
Mark Aspinall and Darren Clark for music directing, music supervising, orchestrating and arranging The Curious Case of Benjamin Button – Ambassadors Theatre; Mark Aspinall for music supervising and additional orchestrations for Fiddler on the Roof – Regent's Park Open Air Theatre; Dave Malloy for orchestrating and Nicholas Skilbeck for music supervising Natasha, Pierre and the Great Comet of 1812 – Donmar Warehouse; Gavin Sutherland for dance arranging and orchestrating and Asaf Zohar for composing Ballet Shoes – National Theatre Olivier
Best New Dance Production	Outstanding Achievement in Dance
Assembly Hall by Kidd Pivot, Crystal Pite and Jonathon Young – Sadler's Wells; Frontiers: Choreographers of Canada by James Kudelka, Crystal Pite and Emma Portner, National Ballet of Canada – Sadler's Wells; Theatre of Dreams, Hofesh Shechter Company – Sadler's Wells; An Untitled Love, A.I.M by Kyle Abraham – Sadler's Wells	Eva Yerbabuena for performing in Yerbagüena – Sadler's Wells; Sarah Chun for performing in Three Short Ballets – Royal Opera House, Linbury Theatre; Tom Visser for lighting designing Angels' Atlas as part of Frontiers: Choreographers of Canada – Sadler's Wells
Best New Opera Production	Outstanding Achievement in Opera
Festen, Royal Opera – Royal Opera House; Duke Bluebeard's Castle, English National Opera – London Coliseum; L'Olimpiade, Irish National Opera and Royal Opera – Royal Opera House; The Tales of Hoffmann, Royal Opera – Royal Opera House	Allan Clayton for performing in Festen – Royal Opera House; Aigul Akhmetshina for performing in Carmen – Royal Opera House; Jung Young-doo for directing Lear – Barbican Theatre
Outstanding Achievement in an Affiliate Theatre
Boys on the Verge of Tears – Soho Theatre; Animal Farm – Theatre Royal Stratford East; English – Kiln Theatre; Now, I See – Theatre Royal Stratford East; What We Talk about When We Talk about Anne Frank – Marylebone Theatre
Special Award
Rufus Norris
Industry Recognition Award
Rupert Bielby; Bryan Raven; Sue Uings

== Productions with multiple wins and nominations ==
=== Multiple wins ===
The following 6 productions and 1 opera received multiple awards:

- 3: The Curious Case of Benjamin Button, Fiddler on the Roof, Giant
- 2: Festen, Oedipus (Wyndham's), Titanique, The Years

=== Multiple nominations ===
The following 19 productions, 1 dance and 1 opera received multiple nominations:

- 13: Fiddler on the Roof
- 6: Natasha, Pierre and the Great Comet of 1812
- 5: Giant, The Years
- 4: The Curious Case of Benjamin Button, Oedipus (Wyndham's), Oliver!, Spirited Away
- 3: Ballet Shoes, Hello, Dolly!, MJ the Musical, Oedipus (Old Vic), Starlight Express, Titanique
- 2: The Fear of 13, Festen, Frontiers: Choreographers of Canada, The Importance of Being Earnest, Kyoto, Machinal, Shifters, Waiting for Godot

== Presenters and performers ==
=== Presenters ===
Name(s)	Role
Cate Blanchett and Tom Burke	Best Revival
Martin Freeman and Celia Imrie	Best Actor in a Supporting Role and Best Actress in a Supporting Role
Naomi Campbell	Best Costume Design and Best Set Design
Hayley Atwell and Tom Hiddleston	Best Actress and Best Actor
Bryn Terfel	Outstanding Achievement in Opera and Best New Opera Production
Idris Elba	Best Director and Best New Production in an Affiliate Theatre
Elizabeth Debicki and Ewan McGregor	Best New Play
Rose Ayling-Ellis and Chris O'Dowd	Best New Entertainment or Comedy Play
Elaine Paige	Best Theatre Choreographer
Jacqueline Wilson	Best Family Show
Shobana Jeyasingh	Outstanding Achievement in Dance and Best Dance Production
Harriet Scott and Gok Wan	Outstanding Musical Supervision
Twiggy	Best Musical Revival
Marianne Elliott	Best Lighting Design and Best Sound Design
Corbin Bleu and Samantha Barks	Best Actor in a Supporting Role in a Musical and Best Actress in a Supporting Role in a Musical
Jesse Tyler Ferguson and Jane Krakowski	Best Actor in a Musical and Best Actress in a Musical
Jonathan Bailey	Best New Musical

=== Performers ===
Performer(s)	Number(s)
Beverley Knight and Billy Porter	"Luck Be a Lady"
Myles Frost and the cast of MJ the Musical	"Beat It"
Jo Foster and the cast of Why Am I So Single?	"8 Dates"
Simon Lipkin from Oliver!	"Reviewing the Situation"
The cast of Fiddler on the Roof	"Bottle Dance"
John Dagleish, Clare Foster and the cast of The Curious Case of Benjamin Button	"Shippin' Out Tomorrow"
Jeevan Braich and Jade Marvin from Starlight Express	"I Am the Starlight"
Jamie Muscato, Cedric Neal and the cast of Natasha, Pierre and the Great Comet of 1812; Maimuna Memon	"Balaga" "Sonya Alone"
BBC Concert Orchestra (In Memoriam)	"Symphony No. 3"
Les Misérables 40th anniversary celebration: Shan Ako, Rachelle Ann Go, Lucie Jones and Nathania Ong; Bradley Jaden	"I Dreamed a Dream" / "On My Own" "Stars"

== See also ==
- 78th Tony Awards
