= The Years (Ernaux book) =

2008 book by Annie Ernaux

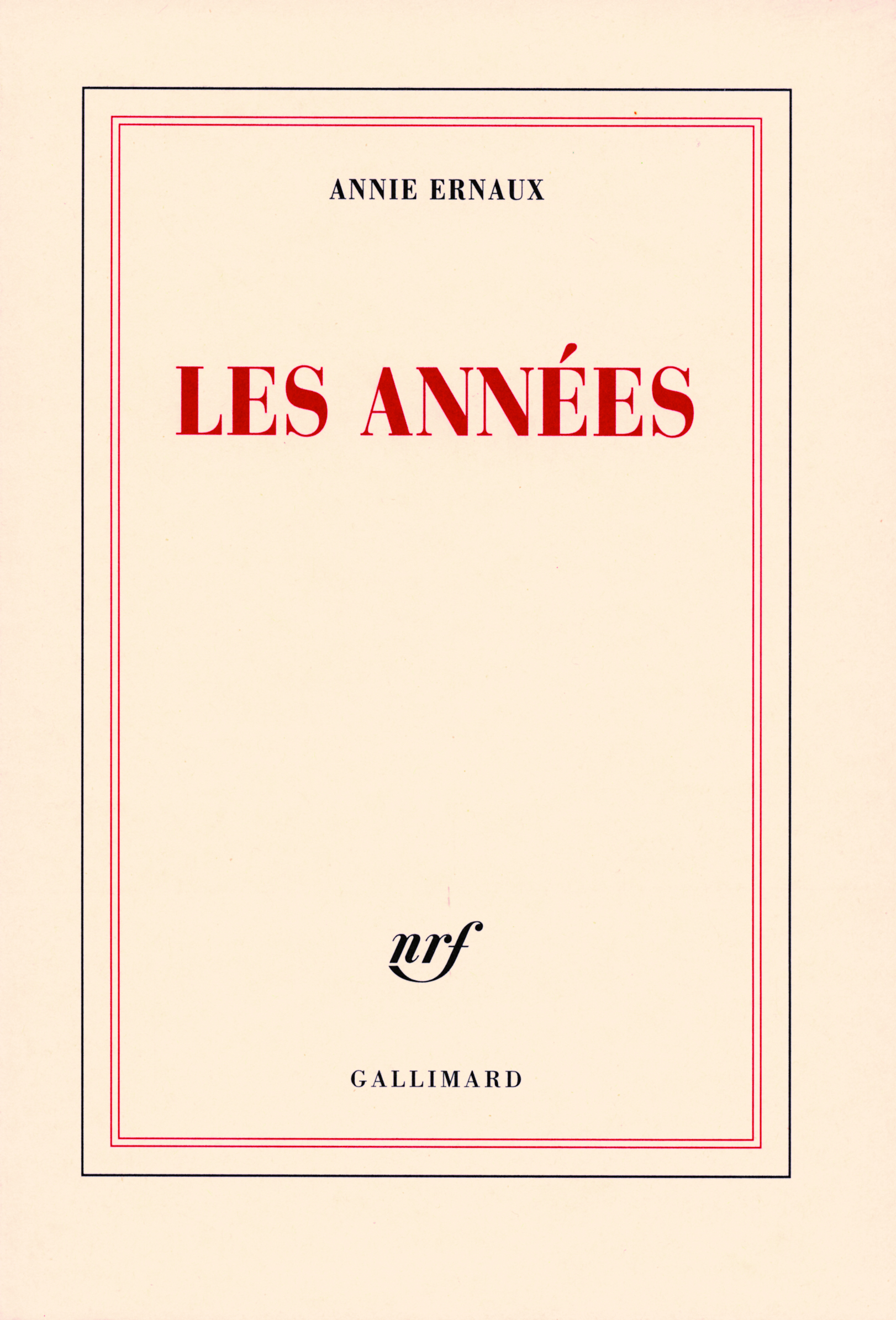
- Collection Blanche cover (first edition)
- Author: Annie Ernaux
- Original title: Les Années
- Translator: Alison L. Strayer
- Language: French
- Genre: Memoir
- Publisher: Éditions Gallimard
- Publication date: 7 February 2008
- Publication place: France
- English publication date: 2017
- Media type: Print
- Pages: 256
- ISBN: 978-2-07-077922-2
- OCLC: 192081505
- Dewey Decimal: 843/.914 B
- LC Class: PQ2665.R67 Z46 2008

The Years (French: Les Années) is a 2008 non-fiction book by Annie Ernaux. It has been described as a "hybrid" memoir, spanning the period of 1941 to 2006. Ernaux's English publisher, Seven Stories Press, described it as an autobiography that is "at once subjective and impersonal, private and collective."

== Synopsis ==
In the book, Ernaux writes about herself in the third person (elle, or "she" in English) for the first time, providing a vivid look at French society just after the Second World War until the early 2000s. It is the social story of a woman and of the evolving society she lived in. With this feature of book, Edmund White described it as a "collective autobiography", in his review for The New York Times.

== Reception ==
The Years was well received by French critics and is considered by many to be her magnum opus.

It won the 2008 Françoise-Mauriac Prize of the Académie française, the 2008 Marguerite Duras Prize, the 2008 French Language Prize, the 2009 Télégramme Readers Prize, and the 2016 Premio Strega Europeo Prize.

Translated by Alison L. Strayer, The Years won the 31st Annual French-American Foundation Translation Prize in the non-fiction category. Alison L. Strayer's English translation was shortlisted for the International Booker Prize in 2019.

== Stage adaptation ==
A Dutch stage adaptation written and directed by Eline Arbo, titled De jaren, premiered at the Het Nationale Theater in The Hague on 3 November 2022. It featured a multi-generational cast of five women who all played the central character. The actresses included Mariana Aparicio, Nettie Blanken, Tamar van den Dop, Hannah Hoekstra and June Yanez. The production received rave reviews from critics. The play was selected for the 2023 Nederlands Theatre Festival. For her performance, Aparicio won the prestigious Theo d'Or in 2023.

An English adaptation, also directed by Eline Arbo, started performances at London's Almeida Theatre on 27 July 2024, starring Deborah Findlay, Romola Garai, Gina McKee, Anjli Mohindra and Harmony Rose-Bremner. A preview performance on 29 July 2024 drew strong reactions due to a graphic backstreet abortion scene featured halfway through the play. Some theatregoers, who were reportedly "mainly male", complained of feeling faint and requested medical assistance. The play, which ran until 31 August 2024, was adapted into English by Stephanie Bain and featured several narrations of the book's passages whereas other passages were turned into dialogue. After its sold-out run at the Almeida Theatre, the play transferred to the Harold Pinter Theatre in London's West End from 24 January 2025, continuing through 19 April 2025. At the 2025 Laurence Olivier Awards, it received five nominations, winning Best Actress in a Supporting Role for Garai and Best Director for Arbo.
