= The Years (play) =

2022 play by Eline Arbo

- West End Promotional Poster
- Original language: Dutch
- Written by: Eline Arbo (adapter)
- Based on: The Years by Annie Ernaux

Premiere
- Date: 2022
- Place: Het Nationale Theater, The Hague
- Directed by: Eline Arbo

The Years is a stage adaptation of the book of the same name by Annie Ernaux. It was adapted for the stage and directed by Eline Arbo. The production premiered in 2022 at the Het Nationale Theater in The Hague, under the name De jaren. An English translation of the play premiered in 2024 at London's Almeida Theatre and subsequently transferred to the Harold Pinter Theatre in the West End.

== Production History ==
=== The Hague (2022) ===
The production received its world premiere in 2022 at the Het Nationale Theater in The Hague. Casting included Mariana Aparicio, Nettie Blanken, Tamar van den Dop, Hannah Hoekstra and June Yanez. In a 2024 revival, Ilke Paddenburg and Janni Goslinga replaced Hannah Hoekstra and Tamar van den Dop, respectively.

=== Off-West End (2024) ===
An English version of play, also directed by Arbo, premiered on 27 July 2024 at the Almeida Theatre in London. The cast included Deborah Findlay, Romola Garai, Gina McKee, Anjli Mohindra, and Harmony Rose-Bremner. The production closed on 31 August 2024.

=== West End (2025) ===
The Almeida production transferred to the Harold Pinter Theatre in London's West End in 2025. Produced by Sonia Friedman, it officially began performances on 24 January 2025 and is scheduled to run through 19 April 2025. The entire Off-West end cast reprised their performances. Romola Garai departed the production on 8 March and was replaced by Tuppence Middleton from 10 March. The production received five Laurence Olivier Award nominations including Best New Play, winning two for Best Actress in a Supporting Role for Garai and Best Director for Arbo.

== Cast ==
The Hague	Off-West End	West End
2022	2024	2025
Mariana Aparicio	Deborah Findlay	
June Yanez	Romola Garai	
Nettie Blanken	Gina McKee	
Hannah Hoekstra	Anjli Mohindra	
Tamar van den Dop	Harmony Rose-Bremner	

=== Notable Replacements ===
==== West End (2025) ====
- Tuppence Middleton

== Awards and nominations ==
Year	Award	Category	Nominee	Result	Ref.
2025	Laurence Olivier Awards	Best New Play	Eline Arbo (Adaptor)	Nominated	
2025	Laurence Olivier Awards	Best Actress in a Supporting Role	Romola Garai	Won	
2025	Laurence Olivier Awards	Best Actress in a Supporting Role	Gina McKee	Nominated	
2025	Laurence Olivier Awards	Best Sound Design	Thijs van Vuure	Nominated	
2025	Laurence Olivier Awards	Best Director	Eline Arbo	Won	
