= Tuppence Middleton =

English actress (born 1987)

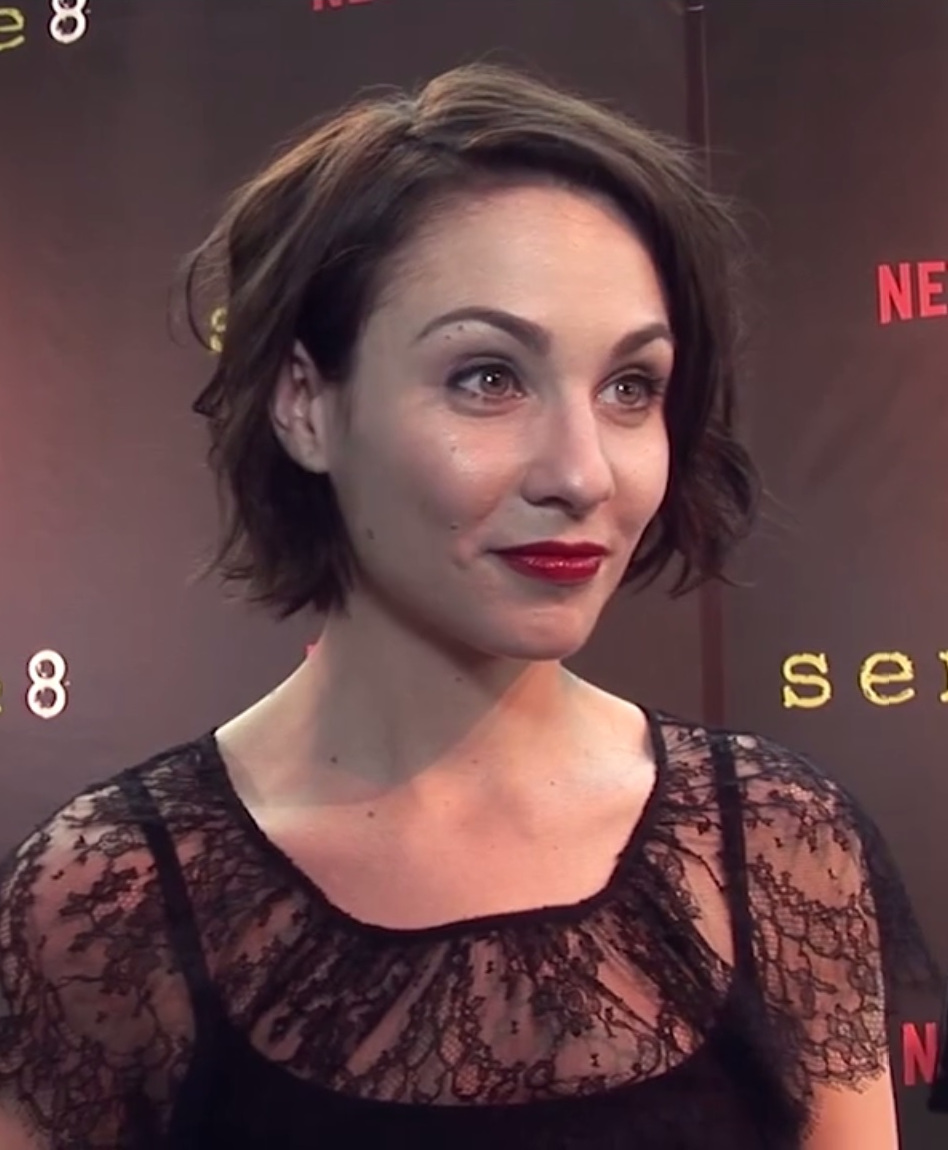
- Middleton in 2015
- Born: Tuppence Amelia Middleton; 21 February 1987 (age 39); Bristol, England
- Occupation: Actress
- Years active: 2007–present
- Partner: Måns Mårlind
- Children: 1

Tuppence Amelia Middleton (born 21 February 1987) is an English actress. In 2010, she was nominated for the London Evening Standard Film Awards for Most Promising Newcomer.

Middleton appeared in various films before making her breakthrough in Morten Tyldum's historical drama The Imitation Game (2014), and subsequently appeared in The Wachowskis' science fiction film Jupiter Ascending (2015), Alfonso Gomez-Rejon's historical drama The Current War (2017), David Fincher's film Mank (2020), and the historical drama films Downton Abbey (2019) and Downton Abbey: A New Era (2022).

She made her first television appearance in Bones (2008) and subsequently appeared as a guest in New Tricks (2010), Friday Night Dinner (2011), and Lewis (2013). She also appeared as Jem in the Black Mirror episode "White Bear" (2013), as Miss Havisham in Dickensian (2015–2016), as Russian princess Hélène Kuragina in War & Peace (2016), and as Riley "Blue" Gunnarsdóttir in Sense8 (2015–2018).

== Early life ==
Middleton was born in Bristol on 21 February 1987, the daughter of Tina Sheppard and Nigel Middleton. She has an older sister named Angel and younger brother named Josh, who plays guitar and sings in the metal band Sylosis. She was named "Tuppence" after the childhood nickname her grandmother gave to her mother. She was raised in Clevedon, Somerset. She has described her younger self as shy, reclusive, and "geeky" at school, but "quite loud and brash" at home; she found youth theatre an "outlet" in which she could be confident. She attended Bristol Grammar School, where she was involved in school plays such as Guys and Dolls. She also attended Stagecoach, a performing arts school in Portishead. She appeared in local drama productions, including a pantomime with her sister at the Princes Hall in Clevedon. She subsequently studied acting at the Arts Educational School in London, earning an honours degree in acting.

== Career ==
Middleton gained a following for her appearance in the 2009 British comedy horror film Tormented. Her character, head girl Justine Fielding, dates one of the most popular boys in school, only to find that he and his friends were responsible for a classmate's death. She has also appeared in adverts for the chewing gum Extra and for Sky TV.

In 2010, she was nominated for the London Evening Standard Film Awards 2010 for Most Promising Newcomer and she starred in Samuel Abrahams's BAFTA-nominated short film Connect. In 2011, she played the character Tanya Green in the British sitcom Friday Night Dinner, and Sarah in Sirens. In 2012, she appeared in the spy thriller film Cleanskin.

In 2013, she made her professional theatre debut in The Living Room, before playing a minor role in Danny Boyle's psychological thriller film Trance and giving a highly praised performance in the Black Mirror episode "White Bear". In 2014, after working on Lilly and Lana Wachowski's space opera film Jupiter Ascending (2015), she joined the main cast of their Netflix science fiction series Sense8 (2015–2018).

In 2016, she starred in the BBC drama War & Peace, playing Russian aristocrat Princess Hélène Kuragina. The series received critical acclaim. The Daily Express said: "Rising star Tuppence Middleton takes on the role of the delightfully evil Hélène Kuragina, who is one half of the incestuous duo. Audiences witnessed her brother getting a little too intimate with his sibling in the first episode before she turned her attentions to Pierre and dug her claws into him. She is a vile character who will use and abuse Pierre without giving him a second thought." Andrew Davies, who adapted War and Peace, described Middleton's Hélène as "the naughtiest woman on TV at the moment".

In 2018, she starred in Vicky Jones' play The One at the Soho Theatre in London and got the part of Lucy Smith in the feature film Downton Abbey (2019), which she later reprised in Downton Abbey: A New Era (2022). In 2019, she played the lead role in the mystery drama Disappearance at Clifton Hill. This film was soon followed by the psychological horror Possessor (2020), the Netflix-distributed historical miniseries The Defeated (2020), also known as Shadowplay, and David Fincher's biographical drama Mank (2020), in which she portrayed the wife of Herman J. Mankiewicz, the co-writer of Citizen Kane (1941).

She narrated BBC World Service documentaries about the Spitfire and the life of Prince Philip, Duke of Edinburgh in 2020 and 2021, respectively. In 2021, Middleton also narrated an immersive step inside a story audiovisual tour for Hyde Park in London based around The Great Exhibition and written by Elizabeth Macneal for the BARDEUM mobile app. She recently starred alongside Martin Compston and Rupert Penry-Jones in ITV1's drama Our House (2022), and is set to star in the folk horror film Lord of Misrule with Ralph Ineson and Matt Stokoe, directed by William Brent Bell. In 2023 she starred in the National Theatre as Elizabeth Taylor in the Sam Mendes directed Jack Thorne play The Motive and the Cue opposite Johnny Flynn as Richard Burton and Mark Gatiss as John Gielgud.

In 2024, she was cast as Frances Forsyte in the 5 and PBS adaptation of the The Forsyte Saga, opposite Danny Griffin as Young Jolyon. The first series was broadcast in the UK in Autumn 2025.

In 2025, she played Annie Ernaux in the stage adaptation of her autobiographical novel The Years.

== Personal life ==
Middleton has obsessive–compulsive disorder (OCD) that she developed at the age of 12. In 2021, she conducted a series of interviews on the matter for BBC Radio 4, in which she talked with a clinical psychologist and a couple of other people struggling with the disorder. Middleton revealed that she "struggles with self-imposed routines that sometimes stop her leaving the house, as well as obsessive mental counting and compulsive checking behaviours". She also stated that she has emetophobia, a fear of vomiting, which increases her excessive preoccupation with cleanliness. Middleton's memoir about living with OCD, Scorpions, was published in 2025.

She has denied rumours that she is related to Catherine, Princess of Wales, with whom she shares a surname.

In August 2022, it was reported that Middleton had given birth to her first child with Swedish film director Måns Mårlind.

== Acting credits ==
=== Films ===
Year	Title	Role	Notes
2009	Tormented	Justine Fielding	
2010	In the Meadow	Grace	Short film
2010	Ever Here I Be	Valerie	Short film
2010	Skeletons	Rebecca	
2010	Connect	Woman	Short film
2010	Chatroom	Candy	
2011	Subculture	Lily	Short film
2012	Cleanskin	Kate	
2013	Trance	Young Woman in Red Car	
2013	Trap for Cinderella	Micky	
2013	The Love Punch	Sophie	
2014	A Long Way Down	Kathy	
2014	The Imitation Game	Helen Stewart	
2015	Jupiter Ascending	Kalique Abrasax	
2015	Spooks: The Greater Good	June Keaton	Known as MI-5 in the USA
2017	The Current War	Mary Edison	
2018	Stine	Lizzie	Short film
2019	Fisherman's Friends	Alwyn	
2019	Four	The Young Woman	Short film; also writer
2019	Disappearance at Clifton Hill	Abby	
2019	Downton Abbey	Lucy Smith	
2020	Possessor	Ava Parse	
2020	Mank	Sara Mankiewicz	
2022	Downton Abbey: A New Era	Lucy Branson	
2024	Lord of Misrule	Rebecca Holland	
2025	Sukkwan Island	Elizabeth	

=== Television ===
Year	Title	Role	Notes
2008	Bones	Vera Waterhouse	Episodes: "Yanks in the U.K. Part 1 & 2"
2010	New Tricks	Melanie Higgs	Episode: "Fashion Victim"
2010	First Light	Grace	TV film
2011	Friday Night Dinner	Tanya Green	Episodes: "The Date", "The Dress"
2011	Sirens	Sarah Fraisor	Episodes: "Up, Horny, Down", "I.C.E."
2012	Sinbad	Tiger	4 episodes
2013	Lewis	Vicki Walmsley	2 episodes
2013	Spies of Warsaw	Gabrielle	4 episodes
2013	Black Mirror	Jem	Episode: "White Bear"
2013	The Lady Vanishes	Iris Carr	TV film
2015–2016	Dickensian	Amelia Havisham	Main role; 20 episodes
2015–2018	Sense8	Riley "Blue" Gunnarsdóttir	Main role; 24 episodes
2016	War & Peace	Princess Helene Kuragina	6 episodes
2017	Diana and I	Laura Phillips	TV film
2017	Philip K. Dick's Electric Dreams	Linda	Episode: "The Commuter"
2019	A Working Mom's Nightmare	Hannah	TV film
2020	The Defeated	Claire Franklin	8 episodes
2022	Our House	Fi Lawson	Main role; 4 episodes
2022	His Dark Materials	Father Gomez's Daemon (voice)	Episode: "The Botanic Garden"
2023	Caught	Penny Pimberhurst	6 episodes
2025-present	The Forsytes	Frances Forsyte	Main role; 12 episodes
2025	Death by Lightning	Kate Chase Sprague	
2027	Slow Horses		Season 7
TBA	Blood Cruise †	Edith	Filming

=== Theatre ===
Year	Title	Role	Playwright	Venue
2007	Hay Fever	Judith Bliss	Noël Coward	Arts Educational Schools
2008	Cause Célèbre	Alma Rattenbury	Terence Rattigan	Arts Educational Schools
2008	The Lights	Lillian	Howard Korder	Arts Educational Schools
2013	The Living Room	Rose Pemberton	Graham Greene	Jermyn Street Theatre
2018	The One	Jo	Vicky Jones	Soho Theatre
2023	The Motive and the Cue	Elizabeth Taylor	Jack Thorne	National Theatre / Noël Coward Theatre
2025	The Years	Annie 3	Annie Ernaux adapted by Eline Arbo	Harold Pinter Theatre

=== Music videos ===
Year	Title	Artist	Director	Role
2014	"Real"	Years & Years	Robert Francis Müller	Clubber

=== Video games ===
Year	Title	Role
2018	World of Warcraft: Battle for Azeroth	Lady Lucille Waycrest (voice)
