= Jenny Galloway =

British actress and singer

- Born: 1959 (age 66–67)
- Years active: 1976-Present

Jenny Galloway (born 1959) is a British actress and singer best known for her stage career, which includes Madame Thénardier in Les Misérables.

== Career ==
Galloway has been nominated for several accolades for her work in theatre.

Galloway can be heard on the cast recordings of Les Misérables 10th Anniversary Concert, Les Misérables 25th Anniversary Concert, Oliver!, Mamma Mia! and Mary Poppins.

In the 2001 ITV children's series Weirdsister College, Galloway portrayed the college porter known as the Beetle.

Her film credits include In Transit, About a Boy, Fierce Creatures and the role of the Foreign Secretary in Johnny English. She appeared in Madame de Sade alongside Judi Dench and Deborah Findlay as Charlotte in 2008.

Galloway had a principal role in a fifth series episode of Marple, The Pale Horse, alongside Julia McKenzie. Her role was Bella Ellis – the town's local witch and cook to Thyrza Grey (played by Pauline Collins) – who are considered prime suspects at many points during the episode. The episode aired as the first part of the fifth series in the UK in August 2010, before the fourth series had finished airing.

She reprised her role as Madame Thénardier in the 25th Anniversary Concert of Les Misérables at the O2 Arena in October 2010. She was briefly reunited with her former co-star Alun Armstrong at the end of the performance, when he appeared alongside the rest of the original cast of the musical for the finale. She and Armstrong had appeared as the Thénardiers in the 10th Anniversary Concert at the Royal Albert Hall. Galloway also played the character in the 2006 Broadway revival of the show.

Galloway worked at the Watermill Theatre, Newbury, Berkshire in 1982, returning periodically, to assist stage management, drive the van, and lead sing-alongs.

In 2013, she appeared as Sister Thomas in the Father Brown episode "The Bride of Christ". She has also voiced characters for video games, such as additional voices for Lego The Hobbit, released in 2014. In 2017, she featured as the Nanny in the film adaptation of Agatha Christie's Crooked House, alongside Glenn Close, Max Irons and Terence Stamp. In March 2023, she appeared in an episode of the BBC soap opera Doctors as Mrs Garton-Hill.

== Filmography ==
=== Film ===
Title	Role	Year	Notes
Little Dorrit	N/A	1987	Oscar-nominated film
Broken Lives	N/A	1994	TV movie
Mary Shelley's Frankenstein	Vendor's wife	1994	
Fierce Creatures	Aquarium Keeper	1997	
The Clandestine Marriage	Mrs Trusty	1998	
The Hunt	Mrs Jenkins	2001	TV movie
About a Boy	Frances	2002	
Johnny English	Foreign Secretary	2003	
In Transit	Liudmilla	2008	
London Road	Margaret	2015	
Crooked House	Nanny	2017	
Mamma Mia! Here We Go Again	Ensemble Performer	2018	
Come Away	Hannah O'Farrell	2020	
Hunch	Elf	2020	Short film
Wicked Little Letters	Lizzie Bayliss	2023	
Magpie	Maid	2024	

=== Television ===
Title	Role	Year	Notes
Within These Walls	Glenda	1976	1 episode
Cannon and Ball	Dierdrie	1979	1 episode
Therese Raquin	Suzanne Michaud	1980	TV mini-series; 3 episodes
Comics	Rebecca	1993	2 episodes
Great Performances	Madame Thernardier	1995	1 episode
The Bill	Various roles	1992–1996	4 episodes
There's a Viking in My Bed	Mrs Tribblewaite	2001	TV mini-series
Armadillo	Komelia	2001	3 episodes
Weirdsister College	The Beetle	2001–2002	9 episodes
Casualty	April King; Eve	1993, 2002	2 episodes
Grange Hill	Mrs Davenport	1999–2002	21 episodes
The Last King	Woman	2003	TV mini-series
Marple	Bella	2010	1 episode
A Young Doctor's Notebook	Lidka's Grandmother	2012	1 episode
Father Brown	Sister Thomas	2013	1 episode
Holby City	Susan Boyle; Annie Dawson	2007, 2013	2 episodes
Breathless	Lily Pearson	2013	TV mini-series
Ambassadors	Mrs Petrova	2013	3 episodes
Trollied	Head Judge	2013	1 episode
Cuffs	Frannie	2015	1 episode
Hank Zipzer	Governor	2015	2 episodes
The Coroner	Ethel Blackstone	2015	1 episode
Fleabag	Retreat Leader	2016	1 episode
Jack and Dean of All Trades	Pam	2017	1 episode
Silent Witness	Rosie Blackfield	2018	2 episodes
Good Omens	Brenda Ormorod	2019	1 episode
Liar	Hotel Receptionist	2020	2 episodes
The Queen's Gambit	Matron	2020	1 episode
The Split	Jeanette	2022	2 episodes
Endeavour	Mrs Pat Treadle	2023	1 episode
Doctors	Mrs Garton Hill; Cath Lowen; Iris Millard	2010–2023	3 episodes
Lockerbie: A Search for Truth	Susan Cohen	2025	TV mini-series; 3 episodes
Only Child	Beth	2026	Series 2; 6 episodes

== Theatre ==
- Sandra – Zigger Zagger (1967) – National Youth Theatre
- Madame Thénardier – Les Misérables (1992–1994, 1995, 2006–2008 and 2010)
- Widow Corney – Oliver! (1994; revival cast)
- Rosie – Mamma Mia! (1999; original cast)
- Mickey – My One and Only 2002; Original West End Cast
- Mrs. Lovett – Sweeney Todd: The Demon Barber of Fleet Street
- Mrs. Brill – Mary Poppins (2004; original cast, 2009)
- Mrs. Pearce – My Fair Lady (Paris production, 2010)
- Nana – Ballet Shoes (Royal National Theatre, original cast, 2024)

== Awards and nominations ==
Galloway has won two Laurence Olivier Awards for her performances in theatre and was nominated for a third in 2003.

Year	Organisation	Award	Work	Result
1992	Laurence Olivier Awards	Best Supporting Role in a Musical	The Boys from Syracuse	Win
2000	Laurence Olivier Awards	Best Supporting Performance	Mamma Mia!	Win
2003	Laurence Olivier Awards	Best Performance in a Supporting Role	My One and Only	Nominated
