= Laurence Olivier Award for Outstanding Achievement in Opera =

Annual award for London theatre

- Awarded for: Outstanding Achievement in Opera
- Location: England
- Presented by: Society of London Theatre
- First award: 1977
- Currently held by: Allan Clayton for his performance in Festen (2025)
- Website: officiallondontheatre.com/olivier-awards/

The Laurence Olivier Award for Outstanding Achievement in Opera is an annual award presented by the Society of London Theatre in recognition of the "world-class status of London theatre." The awards were established as the Society of West End Theatre Awards in 1976, and renamed in 1984 in honour of English actor and director Laurence Olivier.

This award was first presented in 1977, and covers the breadth of a commingled group of specialties, including individual or combinations of: opera companies, orchestras, conductors, composers, singers, stage directors, theatre directors and libretto translators. It served as the only Olivier Award focused solely on opera until the 1993 introduction of the award for Best New Opera Production.

== Winners and nominees ==
=== 1970s ===
Year	Recipient	Production
1977
1977	Glyndebourne Festival Opera	Don Giovanni
1977	English National Opera	Toussaint
1977	The Royal Opera	The Ice Break
1977	English National Opera	Werther
1978
1978	English National Opera	Enterprising Repertoire
1978	Colin Davis	The Conduction of The Royal Opera
1979
1979	The Royal Opera	The Rake's Progress
1979	The Royal Opera	Die Zauberflote
1979	English National Opera	Manon
1979	English National Opera	The Adventures of Mr Brouček

=== 1980s ===
Year	Recipient	Production
1980
1980	English National Opera	Così fan tutte
1980	English National Opera	Julius Caesar
1980	English National Opera	The Turn of the Screw
1980	Kent Opera	The Turn of the Screw
1981
1981	The Royal Opera	Les contes d’Hoffmann
1981	Welsh National Opera	Die Frau ohne Schatten
1981	The Royal Opera	Lulu
1981	The Royal Opera	Samson et Delilah
1982
1982	English National Opera	Rigoletto
1982	Kent Opera	Agrippina
1982	The Royal Opera	Falstaff
1982	Welsh National Opera	I puritani
1986
1986	English National Opera	Doktor Faust
1986	Harrison Birtwistle	The Mask of Orpheus
1986	Anne Evans	The Ring Cycle
1986	Kathryn Harries	The Ring Cycle
1986	Stephanos Lazaridis	Doktor Faust and The Mikado
1987
1987	English National Opera	Lady Macbeth of Mtsensk District
1987	Della Jones	The Barber of Seville
1987	The Kirov Opera Orchestra	
1987	Carlos Kleiber	Otello
1987	Marie McLaughlin	Le Nozze di Figaro
1987	Eva Randová	Jenůfa
1988
1988	Leontina Vaduva	Manon
1988	English National Opera	The Magic Flute
1988	English National Opera	Billy Budd
1988	English National Opera	Hansel and Gretel
1988	The Royal Opera	Madama Butterfly
1988	Welsh National Opera	Falstaff
1989/90
1989/90	Komische Oper Berlin	Orpheus and Eurydice
1989/90	The Royal Opera	Un re in ascolto
1989/90	English National Opera	Lear
1989/90	The Garden Venture	Survival Song
1989/90	English National Opera	The Love for Three Oranges

=== 1990s ===
Year	Recipient	Production
1991
1991	Mark Elder	Duke Bluebeard's Castle, Macbeth, Pelléas et Méllisande and Wozzeck
1991	English National Opera	Greek
1991	Tim Albery	Les Troyens
1991	English National Opera	Duke Bluebeard's Castle
1991	The Royal Opera	The Cunning Little Vixen
1991	Éva Marton	Elektra
1992
1992	The Royal Opera	Mitridate, re di Ponto
1992	Harrison Birtwistle	Gawain
1992	Simon Boccanegra	
1992	English National Opera	Figaro's Wedding
1992	English National Opera	Peter Grimes
1992	The Garden Venture	Out of Season and The Dancer Hotoke
1993
1993	Edward Downes	The Fiery Angel and Stiffelio
1993	Bernard Haitink	Die Frau ohne Schatten
1993	Philip Langridge	Death in Venice
1993	Júlia Várady	Der Fliegende Hollander
1994
1994	English National Opera Orchestra	Lohengrin and Inquest of Love
1994	Paul Daniel and Opera North	Gloriana
1994	Charles Mackerras	Tristan und Isolde
1994	Ann Murray	Ariodante
1995
1995	Roberto Alagna	Roméo et Juliette
1995	Tom Cairns	King Priam
1995	Music Theatre London	La Traviata
1995	John Tomlinson	Das Rheingold and Die Walküre
1996
1996	Bernard Haitink	Siegfried and Götterdämmerung
1996	Jonathan Miller	Carmen
1996	Bryn Terfel	Salome
1996	John Tomlinson	Billy Budd and Siegfried
1997
1997	Elgar Howarth	Die Soldaten and The Prince of Homburg
1997	Wolfgang Göbbel	The Midsummer Marriage and Tristan und Isolde
1997	Karita Mattila	Don Carlos
1998
1998	Paul Daniel	From the House of the Dead
1998	Alan Opie	Falstaff
1998	Nikolaus Leloff, Tobias Moheisel, Bettina J Walker and Mark Henderson	Palestrina
1998	Francesca Zambello	Paul Bunyan
1999
1999	Royal Opera House Orchestra	Le Nozze Di Figaro, The Bartered Bride and The Golden Cockerel
1999	Sandra Ford	The Tales of Hoffmann and Mary Stuart
1999	René Jacobs	L'Orfeo
1999	Andrew Shore	Gianni Schicchi and The Elixir of Love

=== 2000s ===
Year	Recipient	Production
2000
2000	English National Opera	High Standard of Work
2000	Kim Begley	Parsifal
2000	Rosemary Joshua	Semele
2000	Bryn Terfel	Falstaff
2001
2001	Mark-Anthony Turnage and Amanda Holden	The Silver Tassie (London Coliseum)
2001	Gerald Finley	The Silver Tassie
2001	The Kirov Opera	Season at the Royal Opera House
2001	Stefanos Lazaridis	The Greek Passion and English National Opera's Italian Season
2002
2002	Bernard Haitink	Jenůfa and The Queen of Spades (and "musical directorship of a season of great distinction by the Royal Opera")
2002	English National Opera	From Morning to Midnight, The Rake's Progress, The Rape of Lucretia and War and Peace
2002	Karita Mattila	Jenůfa and The Queen of Spades
2002	David Sawer	From Morning to Midnight
2003
2003	Antonio Pappano	Ariadne auf Naxos and Wozzeck (Royal Opera)
2003	Roberto Alagna and Angela Gheorghiu	La Rondine
2003	Lisa Saffer	Lulu
2004
2004	Cristina Gallardo-Domas	Madama Butterfly (title role, Royal Opera)
2004	Simon Keenlyside	Hamlet and Die Zauberflote
2004	Bejun Mehta	Orlando
2004	Felicity Palmer	Elektra and Sweeney Todd
2005
2005	Thomas Adès and the Royal Opera House	The Tempest
2005	Ben Heppner	Peter Grimes
2005	John MacFarlane	Peter Grimes and Lady Macbeth of the Mtsensk District
2005	Royal Opera House Orchestra	Season in London
2006
2006	Simon Keenlyside	1984 and Billy Budd (at Royal Opera & English National Opera)
2006	Sarah Connolly	La clemenza di Tito
2006	David McVicar	La clemenza di Tito
2006	Anthony Minghella and Carolyn Choa	Madama Butterfly
2007
2007	Amanda Roocroft	Jenůfa (title role, London Coliseum)
2007	John Mark Ainsley	Orfeo
2007	Joyce DiDonato	Hercules
2007	John Tomlinson	Götterdämmerung
2008
2008	Natalie Dessay	La Fille Du Regiment (Marie, Royal Opera)
2008	Gerald Finley	Pelléas et Mélisande
2008	Angelika Kirchschlager	Pelléas et Mélisande
2008	David McVicar	The Turn of the Screw and Agrippina
2009
2009	Edward Gardner	Boris Godunov, Cavalliera Rusticana, Der Rosenkavalier, I pagliacci, Riders to the Sea and Punch and Judy (conductor, English National Opera)
2009	Patricia Bardon	The Rake's Progress, Partenope and Riders to the Sea
2009	Ferruccio Furlanetto	Don Carlos
2009	Christine Rice	The Minotaur and Partenope

=== 2010s ===
Year	Recipient	Production
2010
2010	Nina Stemme	Tristan und Isolde (Isolde, Royal Opera House)
2010	Anja Kampe	Der Fliegende Holländer
2010	Stuart Skelton	Peter Grimes
2010	Michael Volle	Lulu and Tristan und Isolde
2011
2011	Christian Gerhaher	Tannhäuser (Wolfram, Royal Opera House)
2011	Andrew Shore	The Elixir of Love
2011	Jonas Kaufmann	Adriana Lecouvreur
2012
2012	English National Opera	Season in London
2012	Amanda Holden	Castor et Pollux
2012	Mark-Anthony Turnage	Anna Nicole and Twice Through the Heart
2012	Richard Jones	Anna Nicole, Il trittico and The Tales of Hoffmann
2013
2013	Bryan Hymel	Les Troyens, Robert le diable and Rusalka (performances at the Royal Opera House)
2013	Edward Gardner	The Flying Dutchman and Billy Budd
2013	Music Theatre Wales and Scottish Opera	In the Locked Room and Ghost Patrol
2013	English National Opera Stage Management	
2014
2014	English Touring Opera	King Priam and Paul Bunyan
2014	Joyce DiDonato and Juan Diego Flórez	La donna del lago
2014	Plácido Domingo	Nabucco
2015
2015	Richard Jones	Rodelinda, The Girl of the Golden West and The Mastersingers of Nuremberg (at the London Coliseum)
2015	The Chorus	Moses und Aron
2015	Jonas Kaufmann	Andrea Chénier and Manon Lescaut
2015	Roundhouse and Sam Wanamaker Playhouse	L'Orfeo and L'Ormindo
2016
2016	English National Opera Chorus and Orchestra	The Force of Destiny, Lady Macbeth of Mtsensk and The Queen of Spades
2016	Felicity Palmer	The Queen of Spades
2016	Antonio Pappano	Cavalleria rusticana / Pagliacci, Guillaume Tell and Król Roger
2016	Tamara Wilson	The Force of Destiny
2017
2017	Mark Wigglesworth	Don Giovanni and Lulu (at the London Coliseum)
2017	Renée Fleming	Der Rosenkavalier
2017	Stuart Skelton	Tristan and Isolde
2018
2018	Joyce DiDonato and Daniela Barcellona	Semiramide (Royal Opera)
2018	Paul Brown	Iolanthe
2018	Roderick Williams	The Return of Ulysses
2019
2019	The Ensemble	Porgy and Bess (London Coliseum)
2019	David Butt Philip; Roderick Williams	War Requiem
2019	English National Opera Chorus	Paul Bunyan
2019	Andris Nelsons	Lohengrin

=== 2020s ===
Year	Nominee	Category	Production
2020
2020	The Children's Ensemble	Performers	Noye's Fludde
2020	Martyn Brabbins and James Henshaw	Conductors	The Mask of Orpheus
2020	The Jette Parker Young Artists	Performers	Berenice, Death in Venice and Phaedra
2021	Not presented due to extended closing of theatre productions during COVID-19 pandemic (Note: Due to late March 2020 to late July 2021 closing of London theatre productions during the COVID-19 pandemic in England, the 2022 awards recognise productions that launched anytime from February 2020 to February 2022)		
2022
2022	Peter Whelan and the Irish Baroque Orchestra	Artistic director and orchestra	Bajazet, Irish National Opera and Royal Opera
2022	Christine Rice	Performer	4/4
2022	takis	Set and costume designer	H.M.S. Pinafore
2023
2023	William Kentridge	Concept & Direction	Sybil
2023	Sinéad Campbell-Wallace	Performer	Tosca by English National Opera
2023	Antony McDonald	Designer	Alcina by The Royal Opera
2024
2024	Antonio Pappano	Music Director	The Royal Opera
2024	Belarus Free Theatre Company	Theatre Company	King Stakh's Wild Hunt
2024	Marina Abramović	Concept & Design	7 Deaths of Maria Callas
2025
2025	Allan Clayton	Performer	Festen
2025	Aigul Akhmetshina	Performer	Carmen
2025	Jung Young-doo	Director	Lear
