= Claire Foster =

Claire Foster may refer to:

- Claire Fox, also known as Claire Foster, director and founder of the British think tank, the Institute of Ideas
- Clare Foster, British musical theatre actress
