= The Man Who Shot Liberty Valance (play) =

Play written by Jethro Compton based on 1953 story by Dorothy M. Johnson

- Original language: English
- Written by: Jethro Compton
- Based on: A 1953 short story by Dorothy M. Johnson
- Genre: Drama/Western
- Setting: Twotrees; United States of America; 1890 & 1910

Premiere
- Date: 16 May 2014
- Place: Park Theatre; London

The Man Who Shot Liberty Valance is a 2014 Western stage play by Jethro Compton based on the 1953 short story of the same name by Dorothy M. Johnson, which also became the basis for the 1962 Paramount Pictures film The Man Who Shot Liberty Valance, directed by John Ford, starring James Stewart and John Wayne, with the song performed by Gene Pitney. The play is billed as "classic story of good versus evil, law versus the gun, one man versus Liberty Valance. A tale of love, hope and revenge set against the vicious backdrop of a lawless society".

== Plot summary ==
A young scholar from New York City travels west in search of a new life. He arrives beaten and half-dead on the dusty streets of Twotrees. Rescued from the plains, the town soon becomes his home as he finds the love of a local woman. This love gives him purpose in a broken land, but is it enough to save him from the vicious outlaw who wants him dead?

== Characters ==
Ransome Foster - A young man from the East Coast
Hallie Jackson - A young proprietor of the Prairie Belle
Bert Barricune - A cowboy and gunslinger
Jim 'The Reverend' Mosten - A young black swamper at the Prairie Belle
Liberty Valance - An outlaw and leader of a gang
Marshal Johnson - The local authority in Twotrees
Jake Dowitt - A young reporter for the Chronicle
The Gang - A few of Liberty's boys
Mourners - Attending Barricune's funeral
Law Men - The marshal's deputies

== Première ==
The play premièred at Park Theatre in London on 16 May 2014, under the direction of Jethro Compton.

It was produced by Jethro Compton in association with Park Theatre.

Music was composed by Jonny Sims.

== Original cast ==
The cast for the world première at Park Theatre, London, was as follows:

- Oliver Lansley as Ransome Foster
- Niamh Walsh as Hallie Jackson
- Paul Albertson as Bert Barricune
- Lanre Malaolu as Jim Mosten
- James Marlowe as Liberty Valance
- Robert G. Slade as Marshal Johnson
- Hayden Wood as Jake Dowitt
- With the voice of Robert Vaughn

== Reception ==
The première received a largely positive critical response with Charles Spencer of The Daily Telegraph calling it "a genuinely gripping drama and one I warmly recommend" in his four-star review.

The Stage wrote of the production, "Jethro Compton’s production never tries to emulate the film but boldly treads its own path by using the original tale as a launch pad for a highly atmospheric, visceral and triumphant adaptation that audaciously takes an unfashionable genre and makes it resonate loud and clear."

In a five-star review The Upcoming stated, "The characters are believable, the acting ridiculously good. Every pause, raise of an eyebrow, touch of a brow brims over with meaning and tension. The play will have you perched on the edge of your seat from beginning to end".

Time Out, however, said of the production in its three-star review: "This otherwise compelling production’s main problem is that it’s just too much like a movie."

== Publication ==
The play script was first published by Oberon Books in 2014.
A second, acting edition was published by Samuel French, Inc. in 2015.
