= Ballet Shoes (play) =

2024 play based on novel

- Poster for the 2025 National Theatre run
- Original language: English
- Written by: Kendall Feaver
- Based on: Ballet Shoes by Noel Streatfeild

Premiere
- Date: 26 November 2024
- Place: Olivier Theatre, Royal National Theatre, London
- Directed by: Katy Rudd

Ballet Shoes is a play based on the children's novel of the same name by Noel Streatfeild, adapted for the stage by Kendall Feaver.

== Production history ==
The play made its world premiere in the Olivier Theatre at the Royal National Theatre, London from 26 November 2024 running until 22 February 2025, directed by Katy Rudd. Full casting was announced on 26 September 2024. Due to the success of the run, it was announced that the production will return to the Olivier Theatre from 17 November 2025 running until 21 February 2026. Casting was announced on 12 September 2025.

It was subsequently announced that the play will tour the UK from August 2027, including a run at Sadler's Wells Theatre, London, starring Anton Du Beke (at certain venues) as Great Uncle Matthew/Fidolia.

== Cast and characters ==
| Character | National Theatre | |
| Character | 2024 | 2025 |
|---|---|---|
| Pauline Fossil | Grace Saif | Nina Cassells |
| Petrova Fossil | Yanexi Enriquez | Sienna Arif-Knights |
| Posy Fossil | Daisy Sequerra | Scarlett Monahan |
| Great Uncle Matthew (GUM) / Madame Fidolia | Justin Salinger | Justin Salinger |
| Nana (Miss Guthridge) | Jenny Galloway | Lesley Nichol |
| Sylvia Rose Brown | Pearl Mackie | Anoushka Lucas |
| Theo Dane | Nadine Higgin | Nadine Higgin |
| Winifred | Sonya Cullingford | Gracie Hodson-Prior |
| Jayan Saravanan | Sid Sagar | Raj Bajaj |
| Doctor Jakes | Helena Lymbery | Pandora Colin |

== Reception ==
Writing in The Guardian, Arifa Akbar gave Ballet Shoes four stars out of five, and described it as "an elegant Christmas cracker of a show... filled with spectacular theatricality and fabulous performances all round." The same newspaper said it was "the perfect tale for our own age of austerity", naming it as one of its twenty best festive theatre shows.

Sarah Crompton, reviewing the play for WhatsOnStage.com, opined that it was "a Christmas show with heart, soul and a flurry of movement to sweep you away", and awarded it five stars out of five. Writing for the Evening Standard, Nick Curtis was similarly effusive, also awarding five stars out of five, praising the cast as "excellent" and calling it "delicious... suffused with gung-ho spirit, exuberance and larky wit." He went on to say that "in its celebration of plucky women and old-school values – personal and theatrical – [Ballet Shoes] never puts a foot wrong." Time Out's Andrzej Lukowski was more lukewarm, giving the show three stars out of five and saying it was "luxuriant but plodding."

== Awards and nominations ==
| Year | Award | Category | Nominee | Result | Ref. |
|---|---|---|---|---|---|
| 2025 | Laurence Olivier Awards | Best Entertainment or Comedy Play | | Nominated | |
| 2025 | Laurence Olivier Awards | Best Set Design | Frankie Bradshaw | Nominated | |
| 2025 | Laurence Olivier Awards | Outstanding Musical Contribution | Gavin Sutherland (for dance arranging and orchestrating) and Asaf Zohar (for composing) | Nominated | |
| 2025 | The Stage Debut Awards | Best Performer in a Play | Daisy Sequerra | Nominated | |
| 2026 | Evening Standard Theatre Awards | Best Production | Frankie Bradshaw | Nominated | |
| 2026 | WhatsOnStage Awards | Best Set Design | Frankie Bradshaw | Nominated | |
| 2026 | WhatsOnStage Awards | Best Choreography | Ellen Kane | Nominated | |
