= The Frontier Trilogy =

Triptych of plays written by Jethro Compton

- Original language: English
- Written by: Jethro Compton
- Genre: Drama/Western
- Setting: California; United States of America; 1855 - 1866

Premiere
- Date: 05 August 2015
- Place: Edinburgh Festival Fringe; Edinburgh

The Frontier Trilogy is a 2015 Western triptych of stage plays by Jethro Compton. The trilogy consists of Blood Red Moon, The Clock Strikes Noon and The Rattlesnake's Kiss alongside two additional short stories, San Sebastian and Noche De Sangre which "expand the world of the plays".

== Plot summary ==
Blood Red Moon - Follow the brothers as they journey west to California. Gold and fortune await, but so too does the blood moon – an omen warning death follows close behind. Brotherhood has kept them together; jealousy threatens to tear them apart.

The Clock Strikes Noon - Trapped, guns near empty, the clock is ticking. Walker must make the choice: to do what's easy, or to do what's right. The railroad shines like a beacon of the modern age; for the people of Cooper's Ridge, it brings only darkness.

The Rattlesnake's Kiss - Hidden deep in the dust of the American West, the outlaw comes face to face with the lawman in search of justice. His life of murder is far behind, but can he ever escape the man he was born to become?

== Première ==
The play premièred at the Edinburgh Festival Fringe on 5 August 2015, under the direction of Jethro Compton.

== Original cast ==
The cast for the world première at the Edinburgh Festival Fringe was as follows:

- Sam Donnelly
- Chris Huntly-Turner
- Jonathan Mathews
- Bebe Sanders

== Publication ==
The play script, and accompanying stories, was published by Samuel French, Inc. in 2015.
