= Laurence Olivier Award for Outstanding Musical Contribution =

Annual award for London theatre

Laurence Olivier Award for Best Outstanding Musical Contribution
- Location: England
- Presented by: Society of London Theatre
- First award: 2014
- Currently held by: Chris Fenwick and Sean Hayes for Good Night, Oscar (2026)
- Website: officiallondontheatre.com/olivier-awards/

The Laurence Olivier Award for Outstanding Musical Contribution is an annual award presented by the Society of London Theatre in recognition of the "world-class status of London theatre." The awards were established as the Society of West End Theatre Awards in 1976, and renamed in 1984 in honour of English actor and director Laurence Olivier.

This award was introduced in 2014 as Outstanding Achievement in Music, and was renamed to Best Original Score or New Orchestrations from 2020 to 2023.

Since 2024, the award was given its current name and reconfigured to honor librettists (book, lyrics and score) alongside Best New Musical, while other music elements (arrangements, music direction, music supervision and orchestrations) honored in this category.

== Winners and nominees ==
=== 2010s ===
Year	Production	Recipient
2014
2014	Once	Martin Lowe, Glen Hansard and Markéta Irglová
2014	Merrily We Roll Along	The Orchestra
2014	The Book of Mormon	Trey Parker, Robert Lopez and Matt Stone
2014	The Scottsboro Boys	John Kander and Fred Ebb
2015
2015	Sunny Afternoon	Ray Davies
2015	Beautiful	The Orchestra
2015	Here Lies Love	David Byrne and Fatboy Slim
2015	Memphis	David Bryan, Joe DiPietro, Tim Sutton and the Band
2016
2016	In the Heights	Lin-Manuel Miranda
2016	Bend It Like Beckham	Howard Goodall, Charles Hart and Kuljit Bhamra
2016	Farinelli and the King	Claire van Kampen, the Orchestra, Iestyn Davies and the Farinelli Singers
2016	Kinky Boots	Cyndi Lauper and Stephen Oremus
2017
2017	School of Rock	Three children's bands who play live every night
2017	Dreamgirls	Henry Krieger
2017	Harry Potter and the Cursed Child	Imogen Heap
2017	Jesus Christ Superstar	The Band and Company
2018
2018	Hamilton	Alex Lacamoire and Lin-Manuel Miranda
2018	Everybody's Talking About Jamie	Dan Gillespie Sells
2018	Follies	The orchestra, under the musical supervision of Nicholas Skilbeck and music director Nigel Lilley
2018	Girl from the North Country	Bob Dylan and Simon Hale
2019
2019	Come from Away	David Hein, Irene Sankoff, Ian Eisendrath, August Eriksmoen, Alan Berry and the Band
2019	A Monster Calls	Benji Bower and Will Bower
2019	Fun Home	Lisa Kron and Jeanine Tesori
2019	The Inheritance	Paul Englishby
2019	Six	Joe Beighton, Tom Curran, Toby Marlow and Lucy Moss

=== 2020s ===
Year	Production	Recipient
2020
2020	Dear Evan Hansen	Alex Lacamoire, Benj Pasek, and Justin Paul
2020	Waitress	Sara Bareilles
2020	Fiddler on the Roof	Jason Carr
2020	& Juliet	Dominic Fallacaro and Bill Sherman
2020	Amélie	Barnaby Race
2021	Not presented due to extended closing of theatre productions during COVID-19 pandemic (Note: Due to late March 2020 to late July 2021 closing of London theatre productions during the COVID-19 pandemic in England, the 2022 awards recognise productions that launched anytime from February 2020 to February 2022)	
2022
2022	Get Up, Stand Up! The Bob Marley Musical	Simon Hale (orchestrations)
2022	Anything Goes	David Chase, Bill Elliott and Rob Fisher (orchestrations)
2022	Back to the Future: The Musical	Alan Silvestri and Glen Ballard (music and lyrics), Bryan Crook and Ethan Popp (orchestrations)
2022	Life of Pi	Andrew T. Mackay (music)
2023
2023	Standing at the Sky's Edge	Richard Hawley (music and lyrics), Tom Deering (orchestrations)
2023	The Band's Visit	David Yazbek (music and lyrics), Jamshied Sharifi (orchestrations), Andrea Grody (additional arrangements)
2023	My Neighbour Totoro	Joe Hisaishi (music), Will Stuart (orchestrations and arrangements)
2023	Rodgers and Hammerstein's Oklahoma!	Daniel Kluger (orchestrations and arrangements), Nathan Koci (additional vocal arrangements)
2024
2024	Sunset Boulevard	Alan Williams (music direction and music supervision)
2024	Guys and Dolls	Tom Brady (arrangements and music supervision), Charlie Rosen (orchestrations)
2024	Just for One Day	Matt Brind (arrangements, music supervision, and orchestrations)
2024	Operation Mincemeat	Joe Bunker (music direction), Steve Sidwell (orchestrations)
2025
2025	The Curious Case of Benjamin Button	Darren Clark and Mark Aspinall (musical direction, music supervision, orchestration and arrangements)
2025	Fiddler on the Roof	Mark Aspinall (music supervision and additional orchestrations)
2025	Natasha, Pierre & The Great Comet of 1812	Dave Malloy (orchestration) and Nicholas Skilbeck (music supervision)
2025	Ballet Shoes	Gavin Sutherland (dance arrangement and orchestration) and Asaf Zohar (composition)
