= Gina McKee =

British actress

- Born: Georgina McKee; 14 April 1964 (age 62); Peterlee, County Durham, England
- Education: East Durham College, National Youth Theatre
- Occupation: Actress
- Years active: 1979–present
- Spouse: Kez Cary (m. 1989)

Georgina McKee (born 14 April 1964) is an English actress. She won the 1997 BAFTA TV Award for Best Actress for Our Friends in the North (1996), and earned subsequent nominations for The Lost Prince (2003) and The Street (2007). She also starred on television in The Forsyte Saga (2002) and as Caterina Sforza in The Borgias (2011). Her film appearances include Notting Hill (1999), Phantom Thread (2017), and My Policeman (2022). On the stage, she has been nominated for the Laurence Olivier Award for Best Actress in a Supporting Role for King Lear in 2011, Dear England in 2024, and The Years in 2025.

== Early life ==
McKee was born in Peterlee, County Durham, in 1964, the daughter of a coal miner, and grew up there and in nearby Easington and Sunderland. Her first experience of acting occurred in her final year at primary school where her teacher finished the school week off with improvisations. Seeing a poster in a shoe-shop window for a new youth drama group, McKee and her friends decided to attend, initially not seriously but later becoming enthusiastic. It led to McKee's first professional appearance, working on Tyne Tees children's series Quest of Eagles.

She lived on East Dene Way, and attended Dene House Comprehensive, now Dene Academy. From the age of 15, McKee spent three summers in London with the National Youth Theatre. After completing her A-Levels at East Durham College, she decided, with her parents' blessing, to apply to drama schools rather than art colleges. However, she was rejected by Bristol Old Vic Theatre School, London Academy of Music and Dramatic Art and the Central School of Speech and Drama.

== Career ==
McKee began her career in television with several background roles including a part on The Lenny Henry Show. She made her film debut in 1988 when she had a small role in The Lair of the White Worm. In 1996, she played Mary in the BBC drama Our Friends in the North, a role for which she won three Best Actress awards in 1997: the British Academy Television Award, the Royal Television Society Award and the Broadcasting Press Guild Award. McKee appeared in several episodes of the Chris Morris spoof current affairs show Brass Eye (1997, 2001) as reporter Libby Shuss.

McKee's theatre credits include Harold Pinter's The Lover and The Collection at the Comedy Theatre in London. In 2008, she appeared in the BBC drama Fiona's Story and a West End revival of Chekhov's Ivanov. In 2010, she appeared as Goneril in the Donmar Warehouse revival of King Lear, directed by Michael Grandage and starring Derek Jacobi. She received an Olivier Award nomination for Best Supporting Actress for her performance.

She played the mother of a deaf teenager in BBC TV's thriller The Silence opposite Genevieve Barr. In 2018, she appeared in the BBC/Netflix drama series Bodyguard as Commander Anne Sampson.

== Personal life ==
McKee has been married to Kez Cary since August 1989; they live in East Sussex, England. She has been a vegetarian since 1982.

In 2002, McKee received an Honorary Doctorate of Arts from the University of Sunderland.

In 2025, McKee received an Honorary Doctorate of Letters (D.Litt) from Durham University at the Summer Congregation.

== Acting credits ==
=== Film ===
Year	Title	Role	Notes
1988	The Lair of the White Worm	Nurse Gladwell	
1989	The Rachel Papers	Evonne	
1989	Wilt	Party Guest	
1993	Naked	Café Girl	
1996	The Treasure Seekers	Mary Leslie	
1996	Element of Doubt	Beth	
1997	Mothertime	Caroline	
1998	Croupier	Marion Nell	
1999	Notting Hill	Bella	
1999	The Messenger: The Story of Joan of Arc	Duchess of Bedford	
1999	Wonderland	Nadia	
1999	Women Talking Dirty	Ellen	
2000	There's Only One Jimmy Grimble	Donna	
2001	The Zookeeper	Ankica	
2002	Divine Secrets of the Ya-Ya Sisterhood	Genevieve	
2003	Burning the Bed	Caroline	
2004	The Reckoning	Sarah	
2004	Mickybo and Me	Jonjo's ma	
2005	The Adventures of Greyfriars Bobby	Maureen Gray	
2005	MirrorMask	White Queen/Dark Queen	
2006	Scenes of a Sexual Nature	Julia	
2007	And When Did You Last See Your Father?	Kathy Morrison	
2007	Atonement	Sister Drummond	
2009	In the Loop	Judy Molloy	
2013	Jimmy P: Psychotherapy of a Plains Indian	Madeleine	
2015	Hector	Lizzie	
2015	Taj Mahal	Louise's Mother	
2017	Phantom Thread	Countess Henrietta Harding	
2022	My Policeman	Older Marion Taylor	
2022	A Grand Romantic Gesture	Ava	Lead role
2023	Typist Artist Pirate King	Dorothy	
2023	The End We Start From	F	

=== Television ===
Year	Title	Role	Notes
1979	Quest of Eagles	Jane	Miniseries
1986	Auf Wiedersehen, Pet	Girl	Episode: "Cowboys"
1986	Unnatural Causes	Nancy	Episode: "Home Cooking"
1987	Inspector Morse	Girl in Betting Shop	Episode: "Service of All the Dead"
1987	Rockliffe's Babies	Barmaid	Episode: "A Few Bad Days"
1987	The Ritz	Janice	Episode: "Tuesday"
1987	Floodtide	Medical Student	Episode: "Four: The Trail"
1987–1988	The Lenny Henry Show	Julie	12 episodes
1989	The Paradise Club	Bank Teller	Episode: "Short Story"
1990	Drop the Dead Donkey	Lou	Episode: "Death, Disaster 'n Damien"
1990	Medics	Alex	Episode: "Helen Palmer"
1990, 1997	Screen Two	Lynn/Caroline	2 episodes
1991	Minder	Joanna	Episode: "Guess Who's Coming To Pinner"
1991	Paul Merton: The Series	Jackie	1 episode
1991	An Actor's Life For Me	Sue Bishop	6 episodes
1994	In Suspicious Circumstances	Evelyn Foster	2 episodes
1994	Casualty	Ginnie Davies	Episode: "The Facts of Life"
1996	Our Friends in the North	Mary Cox	Miniseries
1996	Frontiers	Sarah Lightfoot	Episode: "Casual Bank Robbers"
1997	Comedy Premieres	Fiona Croft	Episode: "The Chest"
1997	Brass Eye	Libby Shuss / Vivian Banch	3 episodes
1997	Beyond Fear	Stephanie Slater	Television movie
2001	Dice	Angela Starck	Miniseries
2002–2003	The Forsyte Saga	Irene Forsyte	Miniseries
2003	The Lost Prince	Lalla	Television movie
2004	The Blackwater Lightship	Helen	Television movie
2006	Tsunami: The Aftermath	Kim Peabody	Miniseries
2006	The Lavender List	Marcia Williams	Television movie
2007	Lewis	Diane Turnbull	Episode: "Old School Ties"
2007	The Old Curiosity Shop	Sally Brass	Television movie
2007	The Street	Jan Parr	2 episodes
2008	1983 The Brink of Apocalypse	Narrator	
2008	Fiona's Story	Fiona	Television film
2009	Waking the Dead	Jackie	2 episodes
2010	Dive	Jacqueline	Television movie
2010	The Silence	Anne	Miniseries
2011	Vera	Julie Armstrong	Episode: "Hidden Depths"
2011–2013	The Borgias	Caterina Sforza	Main cast
2012	Missing	Jamie Ortega	6 episodes
2012	Line of Duty	Jackie Laverty	3 episodes
2012–2013	Hebburn	Pauline	12 episodes
2012	Secret State	Ellis Kane	Miniseries
2013	By Any Means	Helen Barlow	Miniseries
2016	Royal Wives At War	Wallis Simpson	Television film
2017	Emerald City	Dr. Jane Andrews	Recurring role, 5 episodes
2017	Knightfall	Landry's Mother	3 episodes
2018	Bodyguard	Commander Anne Sampson	Main cast
2019	The Rook	Jennifer Birch	Miniseries
2019	Catherine the Great	Countess Bruce	Miniseries
2020	Black Narcissus	Sister Adela	Miniseries

=== Theatre ===
- King Lear (2010–2011) – Goneril; Donmar Warehouse, London (director: Michael Grandage)
- Ivanov (2008) – Anna Petrovna; Donmar Warehouse, London (director: Michael Grandage)
- The Lover/The Collection (2008) – Comedy Theatre, London (director: Jamie Lloyd)
- The Exonerated – Sunny Jacobs; Riverside Studios, London (director: Bob Balaban)
- Aristocrats (2005) – Judith; National Theatre, London (director: Tom Cairns)
- Old Times (2004) – Kate; Donmar Warehouse, London (director: Roger Michell)
- Five Kinds of Silence (2000) – Lyric Hammersmith, London (director: Ian Brown)
- Uganda – National Theatre (Studio), London (director: Polly Teale )
- Hammett's Apprentice (1993) – Royal Court Theatre (Upstairs), London (director: James McDonald)
- Fighting for the Dunghill – Warehouse Theatre, Croydon (director: Richard Osborne)
- Separate Tables (2009) – Chichester Festival Theatre, Chichester (director: Philip Franks)
- Boudicca (2017) – Shakespeare's Globe, London
- Dear England (2023) – Pippa Grange, National Theatre (Olivier), London (director: Rupert Goold)
- The Years (2024–2025) – Annie 4, Harold Pinter Theatre, London (director: Eline Arbo)
