= The Curious Case of Benjamin Button (musical) =

Musical by Jethro Compton and Darren Clark

- West End promotional poster
- Music: Darren Clark
- Lyrics: Darren Clark; Jethro Compton
- Book: Jethro Compton
- Basis: "The Curious Case of Benjamin Button" by F. Scott Fitzgerald
- Premiere: 15 May 2019: Southwark Playhouse
- Productions: 2019 Southwark; 2023 Southwark revival; 2024 West End; 2026 Off-Broadway
- Awards: Laurence Olivier Award for Best New Musical; Laurence Olivier Award for Outstanding Musical Contribution

The Curious Case of Benjamin Button is a British musical with book and lyrics by Jethro Compton, music and lyrics by Darren Clark, and based on the 1922 American short story of the same name by F. Scott Fitzgerald.

The musical begins at the end of World War I in a small Cornish fishing village and follows Benjamin's life as he ages in reverse through the twentieth century. As in the original short story, Benjamin Button is born as an old man and ages backwards until he vanishes from existence as a newborn. The relationship between Benjamin and Elowen Keene, his love interest throughout his life who ages normally, is explored.

== Production history ==
=== Off-West End (2019, 2023) ===
The musical made its world premiere at the Southwark Playhouse on 15 May 2019 for a limited run until 8 June. The production was directed by Jethro Compton. The cast included James Marlowe in the titular role, alongside Matthew Burns, Rosalind Ford, Joey Hickman, and Philippa Hogg.

The production returned to the Southwark Playhouse, running from 22 May to 1 July 2023. The expanded cast included Matthew Burns, Jonathan Charles, Oonagh Cox, Anna Fordham, Philippa Hogg, Damien James, Ann Marcuson, Molly Osborne, Jamie Parker, Jack Quarton, Benedict Salter and Tonny Shim.

=== West End (2024-2025) ===
The musical transferred to the Ambassadors Theatre in the West End. Performances began from 10 October 2024. John Dagleish played Benjamin Button with Clare Foster as Elowen Keene, and the production features the majority of the 2023 Southwark Playhouse supporting cast with the addition of Katy Ellis, Elliot Mackenzie, Emily Panes, Nuwan Hugh Perera, and Matthew Romain. The production closed on 11 October 2025.

=== Off-Broadway (2026) ===
The musical made its North American debut in 2026 at The Public Theater in New York City. Performances started 8 October 2026 and opening night was 21 October 2026. Originally scheduled to run through 15 November, the run was extended twice, first through 22 November, and later through 6 December 2026.

The production brought back members of the original London creative team, including Jethro Compton as director and scenic designer, Chi-San Howard as choreographer, Mark Aspinall as music director, Anna Kelsey as costume designer, Zoe Spurr as lighting designer, and Luke Swaffield as sound designer.

=== Seoul (2027) ===
A Korean-language production, featuring an all-Korean cast, is planned to open in Seoul in 2027.

== Plot ==
=== Act One ===
At the end of World War I, on 17 December 1918 in a small Cornish fishing village, Roger Button attends his wife who has just given birth ("Rag Ty Yw Tre"/"The Western Wind"). As he arrives at the birthing home at 20:17, the midwife introduces him to his son, who appears to be a 70-year-old man speaking perfect English, already knows his name to be 'Benjamin', and wears a three-piece suit with a bowler hat while carrying a walking stick. Shocked, Roger and his wife Mary take Benjamin home and hide him upstairs in the attic and refuse to tell anyone in the village about their 'child', expecting that at Benjamin's apparent age, he will die soon. Struggling to cope with the trauma and shame, Mary's mental health deteriorates and on the morning of 19 February 1919, barely two months after having given birth, she steps off the cliffs near Trevithick Point to her death ("The Kraken's Lullaby").

Over time, Benjamin remains in the Buttons' attic, banned by Roger from ever leaving out of fear his existence could be discovered by their neighbours. However, despite Roger's expectations, Benjamin does not die. Desperate to live a normal life, Benjamin dreams of freedom ("A Little Life"). For 10 years, Benjamin is confined to his attic and yet, he shows signs of ageing backwards and looks a decade younger. Eventually, Benjamin decides to escape and goes to the village pub to drink his very first pint of beer ("The Pickled Crab"). He is served by a barmaid, Elowen Keene, daughter of the midwife who had helped deliver Benjamin at his birth, and falls instantly in love ("When E're She Looked At Me").

On 3 March 1933, a chain of events is set in motion, causing Benjamin to engage in a bar fight with the foul-mouthed Captain Carrick ("Matter Of Time I"). Looking after him, Elowen gets to know him better and is fascinated by his appearance, more youthful than the first time she'd seen him. Benjamin dismisses this as recovering from an illness to hide his reversing ageing. As they converse, they begin to fall in love under the light of the moon ("The Moon And The Sea"). When each of them tells their parents about their newfound love, their parents shun their romance. Disobeying their parents, they try to elope but fail to find each other. Persuaded into thinking the other has given up on their love by the other's parents, they go their separate ways ("Will You Go?").

On 3 April 1933 in Newlyn, Benjamin lies about experience as a sailor to get a job as a fisherman on The Salty Maid, captained by Jack Trenlee Sr and crewed by the captain's sons, Jago Trenlee and Jack Trenlee Jr, who is nicknamed 'Little Jack'. His unfamiliarity with the equipment becomes apparent as they sail ("Home").

During World War II, on 7 August 1941, Benjamin continues to work for the Trenlees when Jago Trenlee discovers information calling Benjamin's claimed experience into doubt. Before Benjamin can even explain, a Luftwaffe squadron bombs the village, sinking The Salty Maid and almost drowning Benjamin. Seeing Elowen's face in the water above, Benjamin swims to the surface and survives, but Jago is killed. Benjamin and Little Jack decide to join the war effort and sign up for the Royal Navy.

On 5 June 1944, Benjamin and Little Jack are stationed in Portsmouth when they receive orders that they will be sent to Normandy the next morning. In case he never sees her again, Benjamin takes advice from Little Jack and writes a message in a bottle to Elowen expressing how she will always have his heart and be his home, and casts it out to the sea ("To be Cast to the Sea"). That night, Benjamin and Little Jack attend the Portsmouth Navy Ball, where Benjamin unexpectedly sees Elowen ("Shippin' Out Tomorrow"). Elowen is surprised by his more youthful appearance, but Benjamin cannot bring himself to tell her the truth. They discover both went looking for the other on the night they planned to elope. Expressing their re-found love, they kiss and spend the night together.

=== Act Two ===
On 6 June 1944, Benjamin and Little Jack fight in the Battle of Normandy. Meanwhile, as a result of their night together, Elowen becomes pregnant with Benjamin's child ("The Western Wind (Reprise)"). Benjamin returns home to Elowen and his new son, Locryn. The family enjoys a quieter life after the end of World War II, welcoming a second child to the family - a daughter, Lowen. Benjamin's continued reverse-ageing means he has to surreptitiously apply grey hair dye and draw fake wrinkles on his skin to keep up his appearance of an older man ("The Tide is Comin' In"). Roger Button, now aged 78, unexpectedly turns up at Benjamin's house and, while congratulating Benjamin on his family, tells Benjamin that his disguise of ageing normally will eventually be found out.

On 31 January 1958, Benjamin walks Lowen home from school, taking a route through the harbour in order to buy more hair dye and makeup from the chemist. Unaware that a chain of events had already been set in motion prior to Benjamin and Lowen beginning that journey, Benjamin is distracted by an explosion in the harbour-side tea rooms run by the elderly Miss Maureen Moncrief, and does not notice Lowen slipping from the harbour wall down into the waves. Benjamin dives into the sea to save Lowen but she drowns ("Matter of Time II"). Devastated, Elowen and Benjamin mourn their daughter ("The Tide is Comin' In (Reprise)"). Elowen reveals she knows about Benjamin's concealment of his age and his lies. On 28 February 1958, Benjamin, unable to cope with his situation, leaves Elowen and travels the world to find a cure for his reverse-ageing ("Rollin' Away").

On 28 November 1963, Benjamin, physically a young man, encounters Little Jack, now a ship's captain, in Portsmouth, New Hampshire. Little Jack does not recognise him at first; Benjamin reveals his reverse-ageing to him and Jack, while somewhat recognising Benjamin, refuses to believe him and rejects him ("Rollin' Away (Reprise)"). Believing he has nowhere else to turn, Benjamin fills his pockets with stones and walks into the sea to end his life ("The Kraken's Lullaby (Reprise)"). As he exhales his last breath and begins to sink himself, he notices something floating above him. Over the past nineteen years, the message he had sealed in a bottle from Portsmouth, England back in 1944 had drifted around the world and floats above him at the precise moment he begins to drown ("A Glass Bottle"). Fighting against the tide, he swims up and reads "words written by an older, and wiser man" on the beach. He resolves to return to Cornwall to Elowen, vowing to repair his relationship with his wife and son, and to embrace the reality of his life rather than hiding it from the world ("Home (Reprise)").

On 9 December 1963, Benjamin returns home to find Elowen. He tries to apologise to her for leaving; she reveals she had forgiven him years ago. Locryn is less forgiving for his absence, and Benjamin finds out that Elowen is dying of terminal anaplastic astrocytoma. She tells him that all they can do is make the most of the time they have left together as a family. In March 1966, Locryn celebrates his twenty-second birthday, unaware that Benjamin's reverse-ageing means he is now the same age as his son ("Time"). On 20 July 1969, Benjamin and Elowen watch Neil Armstrong walk on the moon on a television set in her hospital room; she dies in his arms soon after. Benjamin moves into Locryn's house and visits The Pickled Crab with him every Friday night, and the two men gradually begin to repair their father-son relationship ("A Little Life (Reprise)").

Benjamin continues to age in reverse during his final years ("The Western Wind (Reprise)"). In 1970, he attends Locryn's wedding; in 1972, he becomes a physically adolescent grandfather to Locryn's daughter, whom he names Lowen. He continues to age backwards until he finally experiences childhood, playing with other children and enjoying newfound energy, riding his first bicycle. On 25 January 1978, physically preteen Benjamin spends his entire weekly allowance purchasing a cake to celebrate his daughter-in-law's thirtieth birthday, and his voice breaks in reverse, getting higher in pitch. On 3 October 1981, Benjamin sees his father, now aged 101, on the shore while playing with Lowen. Having finally seen his son play as he'd always dreamed, Roger dies peacefully the next day.

Benjamin continues to age backwards, with the memory of his life beginning to fade from his mind, and his speech getting less coherent, as he regresses into infancy. Finally, by 20:17 on 17 December 1988, exactly 70 years to the minute since his birth, the apparently newborn Benjamin fades out of existence rather than dying naturally. ("Rag Ty Yw Tre (Reprise)").

During the bows, the entire company reprises "Rollin Away" with revised lyrics, encouraging the audience to make use of the time they have, ending with the words "It's what we do today!".

== Cast and characters ==
Character	World Premiere	Off-West End	West End	Off-Broadway
Character	2019	2023	2024	2026
Benjamin Button	James Marlowe	Jamie Parker	John Dagleish	Andrew Durand
Elowen Keene	Rosalind Ford Philippa Hogg	Molly Osborne	Clare Foster	Kelsee Kimmel

== Musical numbers ==
Act 1

- Rag Ty Yw Tre
- The Western Wind
- The Kraken's Lullaby
- A Little Life
- The Pickled Crab †
- When E’re She looked At Me
- Matter Of Time I
- The Moon And The Sea
- Will You Go?
- Home
- Home (Reprise) ‡
- Shippin’ Out Tomorrow

Act 2

- The Western Wind (Reprise) §
- The Tide Is Comin’ In
- Matter Of Time II
- The Tide Is Comin’ In (Reprise)
- Rollin’ Away
- Rollin’ Away (Reprise) §
- The Kraken's Lullaby (Reprise) §
- A Glass Bottle †
- Home (Reprise)
- Time
- A Little Life (Reprise) §
- The Western Wind (Reprise) ±
- Rag Ty Yw Tre (Reprise) ±
- Rollin’ Away (Reprise) §

Notes on the songs:

- † denotes a song included on the 2025 Cast Recording but not named in the programme.
- ‡ "Home (Reprise)" in Act One is alternatively titled "To Be Cast To The Sea" on the 2025 Cast Recording.
- § denotes a song not included on the 2025 Cast Recording.
- ± The finale is collectively titled "The Last Part of the Journey" on the 2025 Cast Recording.

== Critical reception ==
The musical received five-star reviews from WhatsOnStage, Broadway World, The Reviews Hub and The Upcoming. Its 2023 revival received the 2024 Offie for "Best Musical Production".

== Awards and nominations ==
Year	Award	Category	Nominee	Result
2025	Laurence Olivier Awards	Best New Musical		Won
2025	Laurence Olivier Awards	Best Actor in a Musical	John Dagleish	Won
2025	Laurence Olivier Awards	Best Actress in a Musical	Clare Foster	Nominated
2025	Laurence Olivier Awards	Outstanding Musical Contribution	Darren Clark (Music Supervision, Orchestrations and Arrangements), Mark Aspinall (Musical Direction, Music Supervision, Orchestrations and Arrangements)	Won
