= Gavin Sutherland (conductor) =

British conductor, arranger/orchestrator, pianist and musicologist

Gavin Sutherland (born 1972) is a conductor, composer/arranger, pianist and musicologist. He is currently Principal Guest Conductor for English National Ballet.

Born in Chester-le-Street, County Durham, England, he studied conducting, piano and orchestration at University of Huddersfield and graduated with first-class honours, as well as gaining the Kruczynski Prize for Piano and the Davidson Prize for Distinction Brought to the Institution. In 2019 he was conferred with an Honorary Doctorate from the University, for distinguished services to music.

In 2019 he was nominated for the inaugural Critics' Circle National Dance Award for Outstanding Creative Contribution, and won it the following year.

In 2024 he was appointed a Freeman of the City of London.

== Ballet ==
Sutherland was appointed as pianist and staff conductor for Northern Ballet Theatre from 1992 – 98. On the basis of his first CD, British Light Music Discoveries on ASV, Gavin began working with the Royal Ballet Sinfonia on the concert platform and as the orchestra of Birmingham Royal Ballet (involving both national and international tours). He has featured as Principal Guest Conductor of the Royal New Zealand Ballet, and has also guest conducted for New National Ballet of Japan, Norwegian National Ballet, Atlanta Ballet, New Adventures, Tokyo Ballet and South African Ballet Theatre. In 2021 he made his debut with the Bavarian State Ballet, and further recent collaborations included the Royal Ballet of Flanders, the Royal Swedish Ballet, the Finnish National Ballet and the Vienna State Ballet.

After many years as a guest conductor, in June 2008 he was appointed Music Director of English National Ballet, becoming Principal Conductor in 2010. He has conducted the company on both national and international tours, and has also contributed orchestrations to the company for their productions of Raymonda (Glazunov) Akram Khan's Giselle (Vincenzo Lamagna after Adam), Le Corsaire (Adam et al.), Men Y Men (Rachmaninoff), No Man's Land (Liszt), and the ENB2 productions of Angelina Ballerina's Big Audition, Angelina's Star Performance and the My First Ballet series, alongside many classic pas de deuxs for galas and competitions. In 2016 Sutherland orchestrated Vincenzo Lamagna's score for the Olivier Award-winning Akram Khan's Giselle for the company, and in 2018 he worked with ballet musicologist Lars Payne on reconstructing the complete original score of La Bayadere for the Berliner Staatsballet production by Alexei Ratmansky.

In 2017 Sutherland made his debut at the Royal Opera House, guest conducting Mahler's Das Lied von der Erde as part of the celebration of the life and work of Sir Kenneth Macmillan.

In December 2022 Sutherland stepped back from the role of Music Director at ENB and became their Principal Guest Conductor.

== Recordings ==
He has made over a hundred recordings in the UK and abroad, predominantly with the Royal Ballet Sinfonia, the BBC Concert Orchestra and the City of Prague Philharmonic Orchestra, for labels such as Decca, Universal, Sony, Warner Classics, Hyperion, Naxos Records’ Marco Polo imprint and Dutton-Vocalion.

He has played a part in the revival of British Light Music chiefly through several popular series of discs, although he has recorded works as wide-ranging as Elgar's Dream of Gerontius, two chart-topping albums featuring scores from the Carry On films, and the single release of the Radio 4 UK Theme. From 2009 to 2018 he was Chairman of the Light Music Society, taking over from the late Ernest Tomlinson MBE, and also being responsible for Library of Light Orchestral Music, an important archive offering over 50,000 sets of light music for sale or rental to the public, in order to actively promote the performance of light music all over the world.

Sutherland has always enjoyed the film recording stage, and has recorded film scores with the London Symphony Orchestra, City of Prague Philharmonic and Australian Philharmonic Orchestras.

== Associations ==
Sutherland appears regularly in concert with the Bournemouth Symphony Orchestra, BBC Concert Orchestra (particularly as a conductor for BBC Radio 3's Friday Night is Music Night), the Münchner Rundfunksorchester and the Royal Philharmonic Orchestra. In May 2001, he began another lasting relationship, as Principal Guest Conductor of the Australian Philharmonic Orchestra, for whom he conducted regularly both in Melbourne and Sydney Opera House. He has also guest conducted many orchestras including the London Symphony Orchestra, the Chicago Philharmonic Orchestra, the City of Birmingham Symphony Orchestra, the Hong Kong Sinfonietta, the New Zealand Symphony Orchestra, the RTÉ Concert Orchestra, the BBC Scottish Symphony Orchestra, the BBC National Orchestra of Wales, the Royal Liverpool Philharmonic Orchestra, the Tokyo Philharmonic and Symphony Orchestras, the Auckland Philharmonia, the National Orchestra of Colombia, Sinfonia Verum, the Macao Symphony Orchestra, the London and Manchester Concert Orchestras, Scottish Opera, Aalborg Symfoniorkester and the Johannesburg Festival Orchestra.

== BBC Proms ==
Sutherland made his BBC Proms debut in 2016 conducting the BBC Concert Orchestra in the Strictly Prom at London's Royal Albert Hall. In 2017 he conducted the BBC National Orchestra of Wales as part of the Last Night of the Proms celebrations, from Swansea's Singleton Park. In 2017 he contributed a ten-minute medley of Carry On film themes for the BBC/BAFTA Film Music Prom at the Royal Albert Hall, and in 2011 he arranged a medley from The Sound of Music played on the Last Night of the Proms by the BBC Philharmonic. More recently his arrangement of Henry Mancini's theme from The Pink Panther was played both in a 2024 BBC Concert Orchestra Prom, and reprised with the BBC Symphony Orchestra on the Last Night, with Stephen Hough on piano.

== Composer/Arranger/Orchestrator ==
In addition to his work as a conductor, Gavin Sutherland works as a composer/arranger. He regularly supplies arrangements and orchestrations performed by all of the major BBC orchestras, the Australian Philharmonic, New Zealand Symphony, Philharmonia, Royal Scottish National, London Philharmonic, City of Birmingham Symphony, Royal Opera House, Royal Northern Sinfonia and Hallé Orchestras amongst others, and his new arrangement of Giselle for the Norwegian National Ballet was revived by Milwaukee Ballet in 2004 and 2014, and staged by Estonian National Ballet in 2024.

Other notable compositions include a musical, Little Women, which premiered in London in summer 2000 and received two West End revivals; a clarinet concerto; several chamber works; and a one-act ballet, Revolting Rhymes.

In 2024 Sutherland collaborated with composer Asaf Zohar to conduct, orchestrate and provide dance arrangements for the National Theatre's production of Ballet Shoes. For this he and Zohar were nominated for Outstanding Musical Contribution at the 2025 Laurence Olivier Awards.

== Other ==
As a pianist Sutherland performs regularly as a concerto soloist, often directing from the keyboard, and appears as a recitalist, accompanist and chamber musician. He has recently released three live recordings of improvisations and compositions, Piano Pastimes. Most recently he provided the arrangements and conducted over a dozen sell-out UK tours for Raymond Gubbay. His work also features the reconstructions of works whose materials have been lost or destroyed, encompassing TV and film scores to classical ballet and symphonic orchestral works. As a speaker and broadcaster he has frequently spoken on BBC Radio and Television, and is renowned as an expert on ballet music, British Light Music and the music of British Television.

In April 2021 Sutherland compiled videos recorded at home by musicians of the ENB Philharmonic into several "Orchestra at Home" videos, the first in the UK during the early days of the COVID19 pandemic. He also arranged and performed concerts and gave talks both for the company's Dance for Parkinsons work and for a large collection of UK care homes.
