= Jethro Compton =

British writer, director and theatre producer

- Born: Jethro Samuel Compton; 14 July 1988 (age 38)
- Education: University of York
- Occupation: Playwright

Jethro Samuel Compton (born 14 July 1988) is a British writer, director and theatre producer. His most notable production to date has been the world première of The Man Who Shot Liberty Valance (stage play).

== Early life ==
Compton grew up in Cornwall and attended Budehaven Community School. He graduated in 2009 from the University of York with a Bachelor of Arts (BA) in English Literature.

== Career ==
Compton's first published play, The Man Who Shot Liberty Valance (stage play), based on the short story by Dorothy M. Johnson, premièred at Park Theatre in London in 2014. The production received a largely positive critical response with Charles Spencer of The Daily Telegraph calling it "a genuinely gripping drama and one I warmly recommend" in his four-star review. The première was directed by Compton, produced in association with Park Theatre and featured narration from Academy Award nominee, Robert Vaughn.

In 2015 Samuel French, Inc. published a trio of original Western plays by Compton entitled The Frontier Trilogy, which premièred at the Edinburgh Festival Fringe under Compton's direction. Sally Stott described the plays in her four star review for The Scotsman as "a rollercoaster ride through the kind of high-stakes drama great theatre is all about", and called Compton "a talented and prolific writer".

Compton's adaptation of William Shakespeare's Macbeth featured as one third of The Bunker Trilogy, three plays that relocated classic stories to the First World War. Alongside Morgana and Agamemnon, written by Jamie Wilkes, the play premiered at the Edinburgh Festival Fringe in 2013 under the direction of Compton, before transferring to Southwark Playhouse in London later that year. In 2014, The Bunker Trilogy was programmed from the Adelaide Fringe Festival, where it won the Best Theatre Award, to perform at the Seoul Performing Arts Festival in South Korea with support from British Council.

Formerly one of four artistic directors of York based company Belt Up Theatre, in 2010 Compton received a bursary from Stage One, an organisation that 'aims to facilitate and encourage the development of the next generation of commercial theatre producers'. In 2011 he became an Artistic Associate of Southwark Playhouse, London

== As writer ==
=== Plays ===
- The Curious Case of Benjamin Button (musical) (2019) based on the short story by F. Scott Fitzgerald. (co-author: Darren Clark)
- Wolf's Blood (stage play) (2017) based on the novel by Jack London.
- Blood Red Moon (part of The Frontier Trilogy) (2015)
- The Clock Strikes Noon (part of The Frontier Trilogy) (2015)
- The Rattlesnake's Kiss (part of The Frontier Trilogy) (2015)
- The Man Who Shot Liberty Valance (stage play) (2014) based on the short story by Dorothy M. Johnson
- Loki (part of The Capone Trilogy) (2014)
- Lucifer (part of The Capone Trilogy) (2014)
- Vindici (part of The Capone Trilogy) (2014)
- Morgana (part of The Bunker Trilogy) (2013)
- Agamemnon (part of The Bunker Trilogy) (2013)
- Macbeth (part of The Bunker Trilogy) (2013)

=== Short fiction ===
- San Sebastian, a prequel to The Frontier Trilogy (2015)
- Noche de Sangre, a sequel to The Frontier Trilogy (2015)

=== Film ===
- El Fuego (short film) (2015)

== As director ==
=== Theatre ===
- The Curious Case of Benjamin Button (musical) (2019) based on the short story by F. Scott Fitzgerald.
- Wolf's Blood (stage play) (2017) based on the novel by Jack London.
- The Frontier Trilogy (2015)
- Sirenia (2015)
- The Capone Trilogy (2014)
- The Man Who Shot Liberty Valance (stage play) (2014)
- The Bunker Trilogy (2013)

=== Film ===
- El Fuego (short film) (2015)
