= Niamh Walsh =

Irish actress (born 1988)

- Born: Niamh Walsh; 17 April 1988 (age 38); Arklow, Ireland
- Education: London Academy of Music and Dramatic Art; University of York
- Occupation: Actress
- Years active: 2013–present

Niamh Walsh (born 17 April 1988) is an Irish actress.

== Career ==
She is best known for her role as Cara Martinez the in BBC One medical drama Holby City. Walsh also appeared in Casualty and Jekyll and Hyde. She starred in the Sky 1 period drama Jamestown as Verity Rutter née Bridges. Before production, Walsh stated that she "researched a lot for this role. I love all that stuff. Bill [Gallagher] used real people as the basis for some of his characters. And by reading books about the period you learn little things that even if the audience doesn’t see it, it adds to your performance."

In 2021, Walsh appeared alongside Dervla Kirwan, Seána Kerslake and Gemma-Leah Devereux in the RTÉ One thriller drama series Smother, in which she portrayed Jenny, the eldest Ahern sibling. In an article with the Irish Independent, Walsh shared her interest in portraying one of the powerful and independent woman in the series, as stated:

It took long enough, but people are sort of realising that women are just as complicated as men. We contain multitudes. There aren’t just three types of women out there… It’s so comforting to see that we’re sort of just being allowed. We’re being allowed the complexity that men have been allowed for years. We are no longer being jammed into boxes.

On 26 May 2021, Walsh was cast in the Netflix adaptation of DC Comics's The Sandman, portraying the young Ethel Cripps.

== Filmography ==
=== Film ===
Year	Title	Role	Notes
2012	Rat Trap	Amy	Short films
2014	Forever	Girl	Short films
2015	Send in the Clowns	Alex	Short films

=== Television ===
Year	Title	Role	Notes
2013	Casualty	Hannah Spence	Episode: "Smoke and Mirrors"
2015	Jekyll and Hyde	Maggie Kendall	Episode: "The Cutter"
2015–2016	Holby City	Cara Martinez	Series 17 & 18; 45 episodes
2017–2019	Jamestown	Verity Bridges/Rutter	Series 1–3; 24 episodes
2019, 2023	Good Omens	Greta Kleinschmidt	2 episodes
2020	The English Game	Martha Almond	Mini-series; 6 episodes
2021–2023	Smother	Jenny Ahern	Series 1–3; 18 episodes
2022	The Sandman	Young Ethel Cripps	3 episodes
2024	Wreck	Devon Devereaux	6 episodes
2024	Dead and Buried	Lena McAllister	4 episodes
2025	Lynley	Helen Clyde	3 episodes
2025	The Revenge Club	Bex	Mini-series; 2 episodes
2026	Girl Taken	Zoe	3 episodes

=== Audio ===
Year	Title	Role	Author	Production company	Notes
2021	The Sandman: Act II	Nuala	Neil Gaiman, Dirk Maggs	Audible	

== Stage ==
Year	Title	Role	Location
2013	Middlemarch	Rosamond	Orange Tree Theatre
2014	The Man Who Shot Liberty Valance	Hallie Jackson	Park Theatre
