= Madame de Sade =

1965 play written by Yukio Mishima

- Japanese first edition cover
- Original title: サド侯爵夫人
- Original language: Japanese
- Written by: Yukio Mishima
- Setting: The salon of Madame de Montreuil in Paris, France

Premiere
- Date: November 15, 1965

Madame de Sade is a 1965 play written by Yukio Mishima. It was first published in English, translated by Donald Keene by Grove Press and is currently out of print.

Madame de Sade is a historical fiction play written by Mishima Yukio and published in 1965. The play is based on the life of Renée de Sade (née Pelagie), the wife of the notorious Marquis de Sade. It details the struggles of Renée, her family, and acquaintances during the Marquis' various periods of incarceration. All the onstage characters are female. After reading about Marquis and Madame de Sade, Mishima questioned why Renée waited until the Marquis was finally let out of prison to leave him.

In March 2009 London's Donmar Warehouse staged a production at Wyndham's Theatre directed by Michael Grandage. It starred Rosamund Pike (in the title role) and Judi Dench as her mother, Madame De Montreuil. Frances Barber, Deborah Findlay, Jenny Galloway and Fiona Button co-starred.

Judi Dench was forced to miss several performances after she tripped over the stage-doors and severely sprained her ankle and thus her understudy, Marjorie Hayward, took over the role. When Dench did return four days after the injury, she performed with a walking stick.

== Characters ==
- Renée – the Marquise de Sade
- Madame de Montreuil – Renee's mother
- Anne – Renée's younger sister
- Baronesse de Simiane
- Comtesse de Saint-Fond
- Charlotte – Madame de Montreuil's housekeeper

According to Mishima, every character is symbolic of some form of human nature, thus the play functions as an allegory. He describes them as follows. Madame de Sade (Renée) represents wifely devotion; Madame de Montreuil is law, society, and morality, Anne (Renée's younger sister) shows feminine guilelessness and lack of principles; Madame de Simaine for religion; Madame de Saint-Fond for carnal desires, and Charlotte (the housekeeper) for the common people (pg. 107 Author's Postface Madame de Sade).

== Plot ==
All three acts take place in the salon of the home of Madame de Montreuil in Paris, France.

=== Act I, autumn 1772 ===
Madame de Montreuil has summoned the Baronesse de Simiane and the Comtesse de Saint-Fond to request their assistance in securing the acquittal of her son-in-law Alphonse (the Marquis de Sade). Alphonse is sought by authorities on charges of sodomy and poisoning following the Marseilles affair, but his whereabouts are unknown. The two women agree to assist Montreuil using their considerable influences: Simian her contacts in the church, and Saint-Fond her web of lovers and bedfellows.

Renée, Alphonse's wife, arrives. She claims ignorance of her husband's whereabouts, and rejects her mother's advice to seek a divorce. Her sister Anne arrives home from a trip to Venice thereafter; she discloses to her mother that she was visiting Alphonse, with whom she is having an affair, and that Renée is aware of all of this. An enraged Montreuil summons her housekeeper Charlotte, and entrusts her with two letters for Simiane and Saint-Fond retracting her previous request for assistance. She then personally delivers a letter to the King of France, informing him of Alphonse's location and requesting his arrest and imprisonment.

=== Act II, September 1778 ===
Six years later, Renée happily receives news from Anne that Alphonse's retrial has resulted in a significantly reduced penalty. Renée had attempted to have his conviction overturned five years prior, but her mother's intervention resulted in his arrest. Renée's joy is short-lived, as she learns that after winning his release in the retrial, Alphonse was immediately apprehended by authorities and re-jailed. Saint-Fond informs her that Alphonse's initial arrest and re-jailing were both the result of Montreuil's scheming.

Renée confronts her mother, who interrogates her daughter over why she seeks her husband's freedom despite his immorality and betrayals. She replies that it is for the sake of chastity, a virtue she learned from her mother, but Montreuil remains unconvinced. She reveals that years prior, she hired a private investigator who observed Renée and Alphonse participating in a sadistic orgy. Renée retorts by accusing her mother of hypocrisy for approving of her marriage to Alphonse when it improved the family's social status and for hating all things that deviate from social norms, uttering that "Alphonse is me".

=== Act III, April 1790 ===
Nine months into the French Revolution, Anne attempts to convince her mother and sister to flee with her to Venice. Montreuil declines, rationalizing that Alphonse is soon to be released from prison and that the family is protected by their connection to him. Renée, meanwhile, reveals that she is leaving Alphonse to join a convent where Simiane now resides. She confesses that after reading Justine – a novel written by de Sade in prison in which the titular character embraces virtue and endures endless misery, while her sister who upholds vice enjoys a fulfilled life – she realized that she was mistaken in her statement that "Alphonse is me", and declares that "Justine is me". She states her belief that rather than simply seeking to commit evil deeds, Alphonse wished to "develop a code of evil", and that "the world we are living in now is a creation of the Marquis de Sade."

Montreuil responds that Alphonse has "built a back stairway to salvation", but that God will destroy it. Renée replies that "perhaps God gave him the task of building it", and that she will spend the rest of her life asking God whether that is the case. Charlotte enters, and informs them that the Marquis de Sade has arrived at the home. Renée asks Charlotte to describe his appearance, who responds that he appeared so disheveled that she barely recognized him. Renée orders Charlotte to tell Alphonse that "the Marquise wishes never to see him again."

== Performance history ==
Madame de Sade's first performance was on November 14, 1965 at Kinokuniya Hall, Tokyo. It was directed by Takeo Matsuura and produced by the New Literature Theatre. Yatsuko Tannami played Renée; Yoshi Minami played Madam de Montreuil; Anne was played by Hideko Muramatsu; Baronesse de Simiane was played by Natsuko Kahara; Comtesse de Saint-Fond was played by Miki Masaki; and Charlotte was played by Junko Miyauchi.

Ingmar Bergman staged the play at the Royal Dramatic Theatre in 1989 with Stina Ekblad as the main character Renée, Marie Richardson as her sister and Anita Björk as their mother. The director made a TV-version of the setting in 1992.

In 2008 Madame de Sade was performed in France and received glowing praise from critics.

In April 2009 Madame de Sade was performed at the Donmar West End in London and received mixed reviews from critics. Rosamund Pike played Renee; Judi Dench played Madame de Montreuil; and Frances Barber played Comtesse de Saint-Fond.
