= Allan Clayton =

British tenor (born 1981)

Allan Clayton MBE

Personal details
- Education: St John's College, Cambridge; Royal Academy of Music
- Occupation: Opera singer

Allan James Clayton MBE (born 1981) is a British tenor.

Clayton studied at the King's School, Worcester as a chorister at Worcester Cathedral, at St John's College, Cambridge as a choral scholar, and at the Royal Academy of Music in London. He was a BBC New Generation Artist from 2007-09 and winner of the Royal Philharmonic Society Singer Award in 2018.

Clayton was appointed Member of the Order of the British Empire (MBE) in the 2021 Birthday Honours for services to opera.

In 2022, he starred in a Royal Opera House production of Peter Grimes which was hailed as one of the finest opera productions in the UK for decades. The Guardian said "Clayton makes a heartbreaking, supremely lyrical Grimes, singing with remarkable sensitivity and great refinement of tone" and the FT described him as "vocally outstanding in the role, powerful, sensitive and dealing with its idiosyncratic vocal challenges as if they are no problem at all".

At the 2025 Laurence Olivier Awards, Clayton won the Outstanding Achievement in Opera award, for his performance in Festen at the Royal Opera House.
