= John Dagleish =

British actor (born 1981)

John Dagleish (born 1981) (/dæˈɡliːʃ/ dag-LEESH) is a British actor originally from Essex, known for his work in theatre.

== Career ==
In 2008 to 2011, Dagleish played Alf Arless in the Lark Rise to Candleford series on BBC. In 2014, he played Ray Davies as part of the original cast of Sunny Afternoon at Hampstead Theatre. The production transferred to the West End in October 2014, where Dagleish won the Laurence Olivier Award for Best Actor in a Musical for his performance. He was also nominated for the London Evening Standard emerging talent award. As part of the original cast he appeared on the original London cast album.

In 2015, he joined the Kenneth Branagh Theatre Company, appearing in productions of Harlequinade and The Winter's Tale at the Garrick Theatre. In 2016, he played Lysander in A Midsummer Night's Dream at the Young Vic. In May 2017, he appeared in Common at the Royal National Theatre. Later that year, he appeared in Justice League.

In 2018 in the film Christopher Robin, he plays the role of Matthew Leadbetter.

He has played the role of Benjamin Button in the musical The Curious Case of Benjamin Button in London's West End, for which he won another Olivier Award for Best Actor in a Musical.

== Filmography ==
=== Film ===
Year	Title	Role	Notes
2011	Age of Heroes	Flight Sergeant Roger Rollright	
2014	The Monuments Men	ADSEC Sarge	
2014	Snow in Paradise	Tony	
2017	Justice League	Black Clad Beta	
2018	Christopher Robin	Matthew Leadbetter	
2018	Farming	Levi	
2018	Mary Poppins Returns	Courier	
2018	All Is True	Rafe Smith	
2019	Judy	Lonnie Donegan	
2020	The Gentlemen	Hammy	
2021	Zack Snyder's Justice League	Black Clad Beta	Director's cut of Justice League
2023	The Little Mermaid	Mulligan	

=== Television ===
Year	Title	Role	Notes
2008–2011	Lark Rise to Candleford	Alf Arless	Main cast, 38 episodes
2010	The Bill	Malcolm Christie	1 episode
2010	Any Human Heart	Lieutenant James Terrence	Miniseries, 1 episode
2011–2012	Beaver Falls	Barry Fletcher	Main cast, 12 episodes
2012	The Hollow Crown	John Bates	1 episode, "Henry V"
2012–2013	Starlings	Gravy	Main cast, 12 episodes
2013	Truckers	Martin Banks	Main cast, 5 episodes
2014–2016	Siblings	Sherriff	2 episodes
2015	Silent Witness	DI Rory Drennan	Episode: "Protection" (2 parts)
2015	Jonathan Strange & Mr Norrell	Naval Lieutenant	Miniseries, 1 episode
2017	The Moorside	'Scouse' Pete Brown	Miniseries, 2 episodes
2018	The Bisexual	Jon-Criss	2 episodes
2020	The Third Day	Larry	Miniseries, 6 episodes

=== Video games ===
Year	Title	Role	Notes
2022	The Dark Pictures Anthology: The Devil in Me	H.H. Holmes	Voice and motion capture
