= Deborah Findlay =

English actress (born 1947)

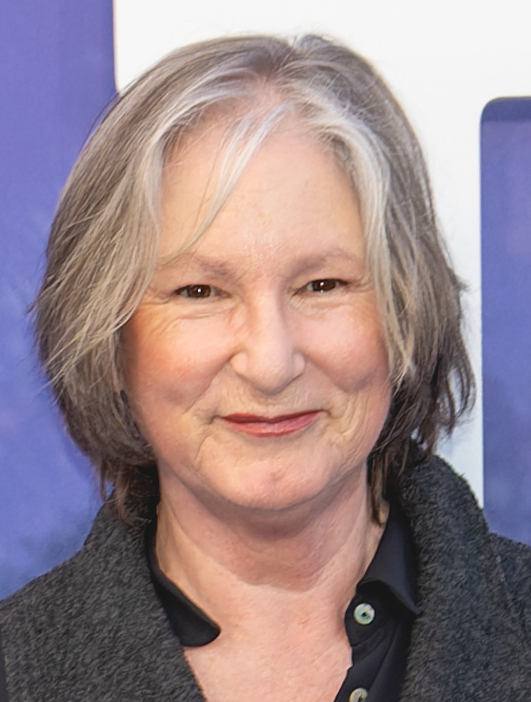
- Findlay at the 2024 BFI London Film Festival premiere of That Christmas
- Born: 31 December 1947 (age 78); Leatherhead, Surrey, England
- Occupation: Actress
- Years active: 1978–present

Deborah Findlay (born 31 December 1947) is an English actress. She has worked primarily on stage and is an Olivier Award Winner, but has also appeared in several TV series. She is known for playing the Defoe family matriarch Ruth in three series of the BBC TV legal drama The Split (2018–2022).

== Early life and education ==
Findlay joined a theatre company while studying English at the University of Leeds.

== Career ==
=== Theatre ===
Findlay has worked primarily on stage, appearing in numerous productions, including the original Top Girls. In the 1980s she worked with the Royal Shakespeare Company where she appeared in Twelfth Night and The Merchant Of Venice. In 1997 she won an Olivier Award, as well as Outer Critics' Circle Award for Outstanding Featured Actress in a Play, for her performance as Hilda, the wife of the painter Stanley Spencer in Pam Gems' play Stanley.

In 2008, she starred in the US premiere of Vincent River by Philip Ridley. In 2009 she appeared alongside Judi Dench in a Donmar West End revival of Madame de Sade.

In 2013, she starred in the Donmar Warehouse production of Coriolanus as Volumnia, a role which earned her Clarence Derwent award for best supporting actress.

In 2016, she appeared on the stage of The Royal Court Theatre twice: as Sally in Caryl Churchill's Escaped Alone and as Hazel in Lucy Kirkwood's The Children. She reprised her role during The Children's Broadway run, receiving a Tony Award nomination.

In 2018, she appeared at the Bridge Theatre in London, playing the role of Sister Gilchrist in Alan Bennett's Allelujah!

Findlay appeared in the UK premiere of Eline Arbo's play The Years at the Almeida Theatre from July to August 2024, reprising her role when the play transferred to the Harold Pinter Theatre in the West End in January 2025.

=== Television ===
Findlay's TV credits include Nurse Motte 1992 Maigret with Michael Gambon; Gillian in the ITV drama The Last Train (1999); and the recurring character Greer Thornton in four of the six episodes of State of Play and in the episode "The French Drop" (2004) in Foyle's War.

She appeared in four episodes of the 2001 series of The Armstrong and Miller Show and one episode of the acclaimed and original entry of the Messiah TV series. In autumn 2007 she appeared with Judi Dench, Imelda Staunton and Francesca Annis in the BBC1 costume drama series Cranford, playing the role of the spinster Miss Tompkinson, as well as in Wilfred Owen: A Remembrance Tale. She reprised her (in this case more prominent) role as Miss Tompkinson in the two-part Christmas special Return to Cranford.

She portrayed Home Secretary Denise Riley in Torchwood's 2009 third series Children of Earth. She was featured in separate episodes as agent Mary Carter in October 2003 and lawyer Gemma King in January 2010 of the BBC1 series Silent Witness. In 2010 she also appeared in Agatha Christie’s Poirot “Hallowe’en Party” as Rowena Drake. She also appeared in two episodes of the ITV series Midsomer Murders: as Hilary Richards in "Blue Herrings" (2000) and as Lorna Sloane in "Murder by Magic" (2015).

Findlay played Sarah Cushing in The Memoirs of Sherlock Holmes episode The Cardboard Box, which aired on television on the 11 April 1994.

In episodes aired in 2018, 2020 and 2022 she portrayed Ruth in three series of the BBC TV legal drama The Split.

=== Radio ===
Findlay's radio credits include Sally in Closed to Visitors by Dawn Lowe-Watson on BBC Radio 4 in 1992 and Hermione Pink in the BBC Radio 4 Drama The Ferryhill Philosophers, starting in 2015. Findlay played Miss Dredger in BBC Radio 4 Drama Mr Pye 2023.

== Filmography ==
=== Film ===
Year	Title	Role	Note
1990	Truly Madly Deeply	Claire	
1995	Jack & Sarah	Miss Cartwright	
1999	The End of the Affair	Miss Smythe	
2001	Me Without You	Judith	
2001	A Loving Act	Dr. Emily Smith	Short film
2004	Vanity Fair	Mrs. Sedley	
2008	Summer	Doctor Price	
2008	One of Those Days	Supervisor	Short film
2011	Arthur Christmas	General 1 (voice)	
2014	National Theatre Live: Coriolanus	Volumnia	
2014	Suite Française	Madame Joseph	
2015	The Lady in the Van	Pauline	
2015	The Ones Below	Tessa	
2016	Jackie	Maud Shaw	
2016	Kaleidoscope	Maureen	
2017	Hampstead	Mary Neal	
2018	National Theatre Live: Allelujah!	Sister Gilchrist	
2019	Making Noise Quietly	Helene Ensslin	
2021	From a Strange Land	Margaret	Short film
2022	Up on the Roof	Claire	
2023	Such a Lovely Day	Granny T-C	Short film
2024	That Christmas	Mrs. Horton (voice)	
2025	A Death in the Family	Mother	Short film

=== Television ===
Year	Title	Role(s)	Note(s)
1978–1980	The English Programme	Unknown role	3 episodes only
1982	Play for Today	Ingy	Episode: "Commitments"
1983	Busted	Angela	Television film
1984	Shroud for a Nightingale	Heather Pearce	Miniseries
1984	Dramarama	Nurse	Episode: "Rachel and Rosie"
1986	Ladies in Charge	Hetty	Miniseries; 1 episode only
1986	What If It's Raining	Marilyn	Miniseries
1989	First and Last	Lisa	Television film
1991	All Good Things	Doll	Miniseries
1991	Performance	Joyce/Isabella Bird/Mrs. Kidd	Episode: "Top Girls"
1991	The House of Bernarda Alba	Martirio	Television film
1992	Anglo Saxon Attitudes	Kay Consett	Miniseries
1992	Natural Lies	Grace	Miniseries
1992	Downtown Lagos	Celia Dawson	Miniseries
1993	Maigret	Juliette Motte	Miniseries; 1 episode only
1993	15: The Life and Death of Philip Knight	Cheryl Morris	Television film
1994	The Memoirs of Sherlock Holmes	Sarah Cushing	Miniseries; 1 episode only
1994	Milner	Sylvia Milner	Television film
1994–2000	Casualty	Caroline Palmer/Debbie Cookson	2 episodes only
1996	The Vet	Anna Walker	Miniseries; 1 episode only
1997	Jane Eyre	Mrs. Reed	Television film
1998	Heat of the Sun	Matilda Watcham	Miniseries; 1 episode only
1998	Kavanagh QC	Susannah Emmott	Episode: "Bearing Witness"
1998	Trial & Retribution	DC Jill Ashton	2 episodes only
1999	The Last Train	Gillian	Miniseries; 1 episode only
1999	Wives and Daughters	Miss Phoebe	Miniseries
2000	Anna Karenina	Countess Lydia	Miniseries
2000	The Bill	Det. Supt. Wray	Episode: "Fifty-Fifty"
2000	Comedy Lab	Roxanne Anderson	Episode: "Anderson"
2000−2015	Midsomer Murders	Lorna Soane/Hilary Richards	2 episodes only
2001	Armstrong and Miller	Various roles	4 episodes only
2001	Messiah	Clarissa Buchanan	Miniseries; 1 episode only
2003	State of Mind	D.C.I. Stella Munroe	Television film
2003	State of Play	Greer Thornton	Miniseries
2003	Home	Margaret Ballantyne	Television film
2003–2010	Silent Witness	Mary Carter/Gemma King	4 episodes only
2004	Foyle's War	Mrs. Thorndyke/Evelyn Cresswell	Episode: "The French Drop"
2006	The Family Man	Mary	Television film
2006	Thin Ice	Jeanette	Miniseries
2007	This Life + 10	Doctor	Television films
2007	The Yellow House	Madame Roulin	Television films
2007	The Good Samaritan	Eileen Mayhew	Television films
2007	Who Gets the Dog?	Pamela Wilson	Television films
2007	Wilfred Owen: A Remembrance Tale	Susan Owen	Television films
2007–2009	Cranford	Miss Tomkinson	Miniseries
2008	Lewis	Lady Hugh	Episode: "Life Born of Fire"
2008	Heartbeat	Eva Knight	Episode: "Out of the Long Dark Knight"
2009	Gunrush	Jill	Television film
2009	Torchwood	Denise Riley	2 episodes only
2010	Poirot	Rowena Drake	Episode: "Hallowe'en Party"
2010	Law & Order: UK	Kim Sharkey	Episode: "Broken"
2011	The Trouble with Tolstoy	Sophia Tolstoy (voice)	Miniseries
2011	New Tricks	Helen Gilder	Episode: "Setting Out Your Stall"
2012	Holby City	Philippa Pawlowski	2 episodes only
2012	Leaving	Vanessa	Miniseries
2013	Starlings	Sandra	Episode: "Episode #2.6"
2015	Life in Squares	Aunt Jane	Miniseries; 1 episode only
2015	Coalition	Harriet Harman	Television film
2015	Comedy Blaps	Harriet	Episode: "High and Dry Blap"
2016	Lovesick	Fiona	Episode: "Jonesy?"
2018	Collateral	Eleanor Shaw	Miniseries; 2 episodes only
2018–2024	The Split	Ruth Defoe	20 episodes only
2021	The Drowning	Lynn	Miniseries
2021	Romeo and Juliet	Nurse	Television film
2023	Dalgliesh	Miss Willard	2 episodes only

=== Podcasts ===
Year	Title	Role	Note
2022	Doctor Who: Peladon	Queen Thalira (voice)	Episode: "The Poison of Peladon"
