= The Curious Case of Benjamin Button (short story) =

1922 short story by F. Scott Fitzgerald

- Short story by F. Scott Fitzgerald
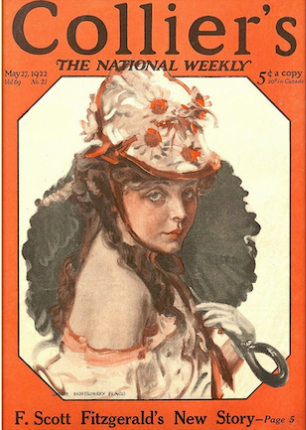
- 1922 magazine cover

Text available at Wikisource
- Country: United States
- Language: English
- Genre: Fantasy short story

Publication
- Published in: Collier's
- Publication type: Magazine
- Media type: Print (magazine)
- Publication date: May 27, 1922
- Pages: 27

"The Curious Case of Benjamin Button" is a fantasy short story about a man who ages in reverse, from senescence to infancy, written by F. Scott Fitzgerald. It was first published in Collier's Magazine on May 27, 1922, with the cover and illustrations by James Montgomery Flagg. It was subsequently anthologized in Fitzgerald's 1922 book Tales of the Jazz Age, which is occasionally published as The Curious Case of Benjamin Button and Other Jazz Age Stories. The story was later adapted into the 13-time Oscar-nominated 2008 namesake film and the Olivier Award-winning musical adaptation.

== Plot ==
Born in Baltimore in 1860, Benjamin Button's physical appearance resembles that of a 70-year-old man, and he can already speak. His father, Roger, invites neighborhood boys to play with him and orders him to play with children's toys, but Benjamin obeys only to please his father. At five, Benjamin is sent to kindergarten, but he is withdrawn after he repeatedly falls asleep during the children's activities. At 18, Benjamin enrolls in Yale College, but officials send him home, believing he is a 50-year-old lunatic. When Benjamin turns 20, the Button family realizes that he is aging backward.

In 1880, when Benjamin is 20, his father gives him control of Roger Button & Co. Wholesale Hardware. Benjamin meets the young Hildegarde Moncrief, a daughter of General Moncrief, and falls in love with her. Hildegarde mistakes Benjamin for Roger Button's 50-year-old brother and, as she prefers older men, she marries him six months later. She remains ignorant of his condition.

Years later, Benjamin's business has been successful, but he is tired of Hildegarde because her beauty has faded and she nags him. Bored at home, he enlists in the Spanish–American War in 1898 and achieves military triumphs, rising to the rank of lieutenant colonel. He retires from the Army to focus on his company and receives a medal.

In 1910, Benjamin, now looking like a 20-year-old, turns over control of his company to his son, Roscoe, and enrolls at Harvard University. His first year is a great success: he dominates in football and takes revenge on Yale for rejecting him years earlier. However, during his junior and senior years, he is the equivalent of a 16-year-old: too weak to play football and barely able to cope with the academic work.

After graduation, Benjamin returns home, only to learn that his wife has moved to Italy. He lives with his son Roscoe, who treats him sternly, and forces Benjamin to call him "uncle." As the years progress, Benjamin grows from a moody teenager into a child. Eventually, Roscoe has a child of his own, who later attends kindergarten with Benjamin. After kindergarten, Benjamin slowly begins to lose his memory of his earlier life. His memory fades away to a point where he cannot remember anything except his nurse. Finally, Benjamin disappears from existence rather than dying naturally.

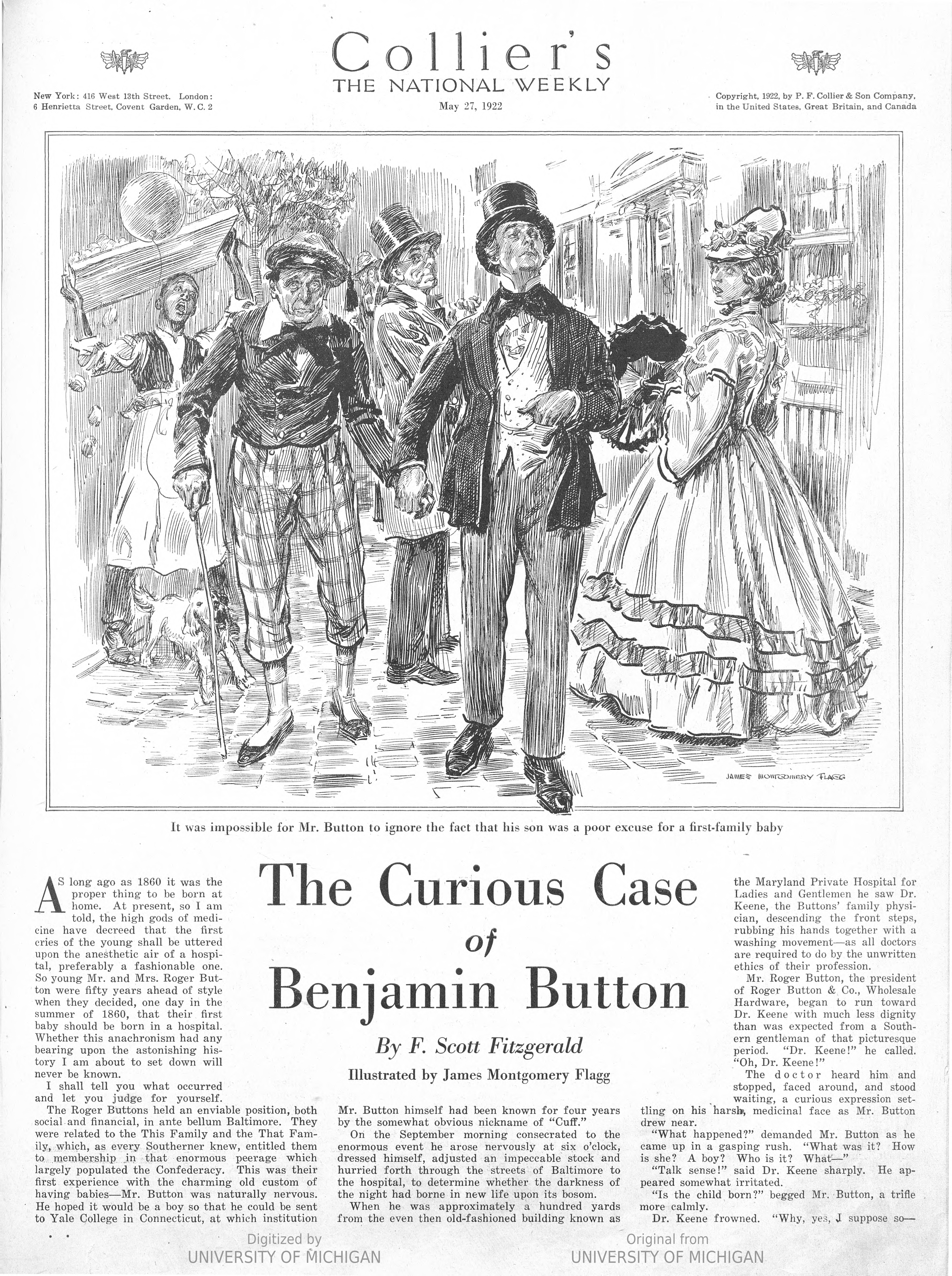
First appearance in Collier's, May 27, 1922, p. 5.

== See also ==
- The Curious Case of Benjamin Button (film), a 2008 dramatic adaptation directed by David Fincher, in which Benjamin (portrayed primarily by Brad Pitt) is instead born as a baby with an elderly physiology who grows in stature and mentally ages forwards but physiologically ages in reverse.
- The Curious Case of Benjamin Button (musical), a British adaptation set primarily in a fishing village in Cornwall.
- Hyperion (1989), a novel by Dan Simmons in which one of the characters, Rachel, also ages backward.
- "Mr. F Is Mr. F" (1961), J.G. Ballard's short story about a man who rapidly grows younger.
