= Rudolf Steiner House =

Grade II-listed building in London, England

Coordinates: 51.5250°N 0.1604°W

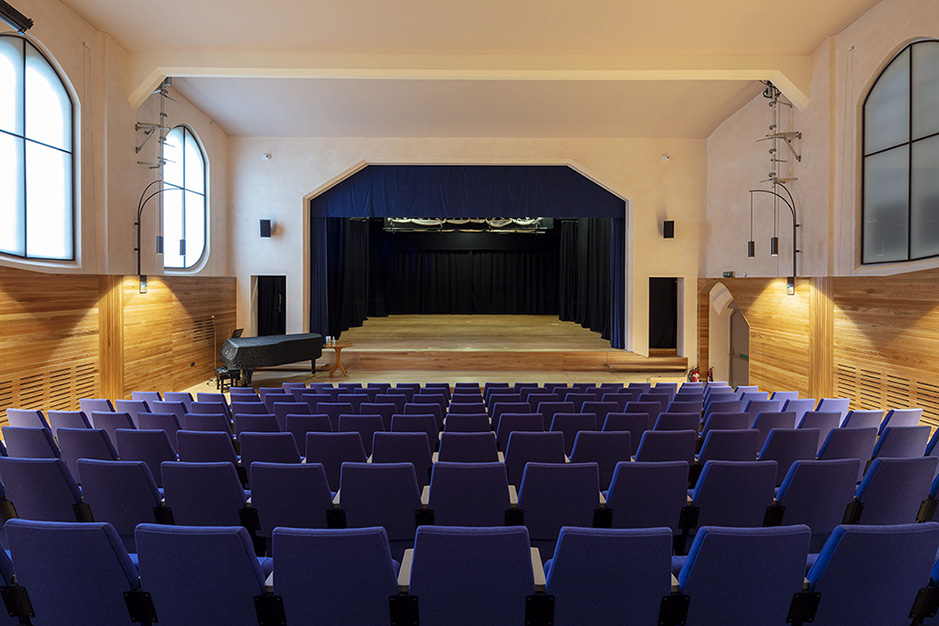
The auditorium of the Marylebone Theatre in Rudolf Steiner House

Rudolf Steiner House is a Grade II listed building near Regent's Park, London which is the home of the Anthroposophical Society of Great Britain and the Marylebone Theatre.

The building was designed by Montague Wheeler in the expressionist style, and was constructed in stages between 1926 and 1937. It is considered the only example of expressionist architecture in London.
