= Clare Foster =

British actress and singer

- Born: 24 July 1980 (age 46)
- Education: Masters Performing Arts College
- Occupations: Actress; singer
- Years active: 1999–present

Clare Foster (born 24 July 1980) is a British actress, known for playing PC Millie Brown in the ITV series The Bill. Foster appeared in the 2011 London revival production of Crazy for You, which played at the Novello Theatre, in the 2016–2017 revival production of Tom Stoppard's Travesties first at the Menier Chocolate Factory and later at the Apollo Theatre and in the 2018 West End revival of Consent.

In 2022 Foster starred in BBC Radio 4's musical adaptation of Rossum's Universal Robots.

== Theatre ==
Duration	Production	Role	Theatre	Awards
1999	Saturday Night Fever	Laetitia; Stephanie (Understudy)	Cologne, Germany	
2002–2003	Sweet Charity	Ursula March	Crucible Theatre	
2004	The Master and Margarita	Hella	Chichester Festival Theatre	
2004	Out of This World	Chloe	Chichester Festival Theatre	
2005	The Far Pavilions	Ensemble; Belinda Harlowe (Understudy)	Shaftesbury Theatre	
2005	We Will Rock You	Ensemble; Meat (Understudy)	Dominion Theatre	
2006	Chicago	Ensemble; Roxie Hart (Understudy)	UK National Tour	
2006–2008	Avenue Q	Mrs T / Bear; Kate Monster (Understudy)	Noël Coward Theatre	Nominated – Laurence Olivier Award for Best Ensemble
2007–2008	The Lion, the Witch and the Wardrobe	White Witch	West Yorkshire Playhouse	
2010	Love on the Dole	Sally Hardcastle	Octagon Theatre, Bolton	
2010	A Streetcar Named Desire	Blanche Du Bois	Octagon Theatre, Bolton	Nominated – MEN Award for Best Actress
2011	Oleanna	Carol	Nottingham Lake Side Theatre	
2011–2012	Crazy for You	Polly Baker	Novello Theatre	Nominated – WhatsOnStage.com Award for Best Actress in a Musical
2012–2013	Merrily We Roll Along	Beth Spencer	Menier Chocolate Factory; Harold Pinter Theatre	
2014	Duet For One	Stephanie Abrahams	Octagon Theatre, Bolton	Won – Manchester Theatre Award for Best Actress
2014	Separation	Sarah Wise	Octagon Theatre, Bolton	Won – Manchester Theatre Award for Best Actress
2014	Guys and Dolls	Sarah Brown	Chichester Festival Theatre	
2016–2017	Travesties	Cecily Carruthers	Menier Chocolate Factory; Apollo Theatre	
2018	Consent	Zara	Harold Pinter Theatre	
2024–2025	The Curious Case of Benjamin Button	Elowen Keene	Ambassadors Theatre	Nominated – Olivier Award for Best Actress in a Musical

== Filmography ==
Film
Year	Title	Role	Notes
2012	Black Forest	Hanna	
2012	Les Misérables	Factory Worker 3	
2013	Merrily We Roll Along	Beth	Film recording of the musical
2018	Holmes & Watson	Lady Stepping	Uncredited
2025	Heads of State	Cat Derringer	

Television
Year	Title	Role	Notes
2006	Casualty	Karen Sambrook	Episode: "Crossing the Line"
2007	Genie in the House	Dilly	Episode: "The Blob"
2008–2009	The Bill	PC Millie Brown	52 episodes
2015	Doctors	Claudia Grey	Episode: "Time of my Life"
2016	Ripper Street	Elenora Freeman	Episode: "The Strangers' Home"
2016	Galavant	Roberta Steingass	7 episodes
2016	The Crown	Nancy Lewis	Episode: "Smoke and Mirrors"
2017	Sherlock	Velma	Episode: "The Final Problem"
2017	Taboo	Maria	Episode: "1.3"
2018	Dark Heart	Alexandra Panousis	2 episodes
2020	Doctors	Sophie Caldwell	Episode: "Haunted"
2022	The Ex-Wife	Hayley	4 episodes

Video games
Year	Title	Role	Notes
2023	The Dark Pictures: Switchback VR	Charlotte	Voice
