= Festen (opera) =

2025 opera by Mark-Anthony Turnage

- Opera by Mark-Anthony Turnage
- Librettist: Lee Hall
- Language: English
- Based on: The Celebration by Thomas Vinterberg
- Premiere: February 11, 2025; Royal Opera House

Festen is an English-language opera in one act with music by Mark-Anthony Turnage and libretto by Lee Hall. It is an adaptation of the 1998 Dogme 95 Danish film The Celebration (Danish: Festen). The premiere production took place at the Royal Opera House in February 2025, and received positive reception.

== Background and performance history ==
The opera is an adaptation of the 1998 black comedy-drama film directed by Thomas Vinterberg, the first of the Dogme 95 films. The film won the Jury Prize at the 1998 Cannes Film Festival. Though Turnage had "loved" the film, he did not think of it as operatic material until he saw a stage production of The Hunt, another Vinterberg film.

The world premiere performance took place at the Royal Opera House in London on 11 February 2025. The production was directed by Richard Jones and was designed by Miriam Buether.

In 2026, the opera run at the Finnish National Opera.

== Key roles and premiere cast ==
Roles, voice types, and premiere cast
Role	Voice type	Premiere cast, February 11, 2025 Conductor: Edward Gardner
Christian	tenor	Allan Clayton
Michael	baritone	Stéphane Degout
Helge	bass-baritone	Gerald Finley
Else	mezzo-soprano	Rosie Aldridge
Helena	soprano	Natalya Romaniw
Helmut	baritone	Thomas Oliemans
Mette	soprano	Philippa Boyle
Grandma	mezzo-soprano	Susan Bickley
Gbatokai	baritone	Peter Brathwaite
Linda	soprano	Marta Fontanals-Simmons
Chef	tenor	Aled Hall
Lars	tenor	Julian Hubbard
Pia	mezzo-soprano	Clare Presland
Michelle	mezzo-soprano	Kitty Whately
Christine	soprano	Ailish Tynan
Grandpa	bass	John Tomlinson

== Synopsis ==
Festen follows a wealthy Danish family gathering to celebrate patriarch Helge’s 60th birthday. The events take place in the summer of 1989, in rural Denmark. During the dinner, his eldest son Christian publicly accuses Helge of sexually abusing him and his late twin sister Linda, whose trauma led to her recent suicide. Despite interruptions, Christian goes on to accuse his father of causing Linda's death. Helge responds with denials and apparent bafflement. The other guests are silent and mostly disbelieving. Another, more traditional, toast is given by an older family member. Christian's sister Helena brings her black boyfriend, Gbatokai to the party and he is racially abused by Michael, another son of Helge's. Some other guests join Michael in singing the racist song. Helge’s guilt is revealed as Linda's suicide note is read to the guests. Helge finally admits to the abuse. Michael then beats Helge physically in the kitchen whilst the party continues elsewhere. At breakfast the next morning, Helge enters. Some guests greet him, but Michael tells him to leave.

== Reception ==
In a five-star review of the premiere performance, Andrew Clements of The Guardian described Festen as “immensely impressive.” Clements called Lee Hall's libretto "unfussy" and wrote that "not a word is wasted". Clements opined that the 95-minute work “grips, moves and appals from first moment to last”. On Turnage's score, Clements wrote that it balances “devastating silences” with moments of “serene lyrical beauty”. Clements felt that surtitles were “all but redundant" due to the clarity of the singing.

Writing for Bachtrack, David Karlin gave a five-star review, calling Festen "black comedy of the highest order". Noting the unusually large cast (for modern operas) of 25 named roles plus chorus and actors, Karlin opined that "there truly wasn’t a weak link". According to Karlin, the "real genius" of the opera lies in the way in which librettist and composer "mess with your head". This is done by "throwing in a delightfully lyrical aria when a singer is describing the most fearful deeds", and "catching you off your guard" by sudden interruptions of party scenes. Karlin wrote that conductor Gardener and the Orchestra of the Royal Opera House performed with "great verve". Noting that the opera would be travelling around the world, Karlin concluded: "It’s rare for a newly written opera to be quite such an obvious winner".

In The Critic, the Australian composer Alexander Voltz praised Turnage's score and the opera's production but was less convinced by the structure of Hall's libretto.

== Awards ==
At the 2025 Olivier Awards, Festen was awarded Best New Opera Production.
