= Het Nationale Theater =

Theater company in The Hague, Netherlands

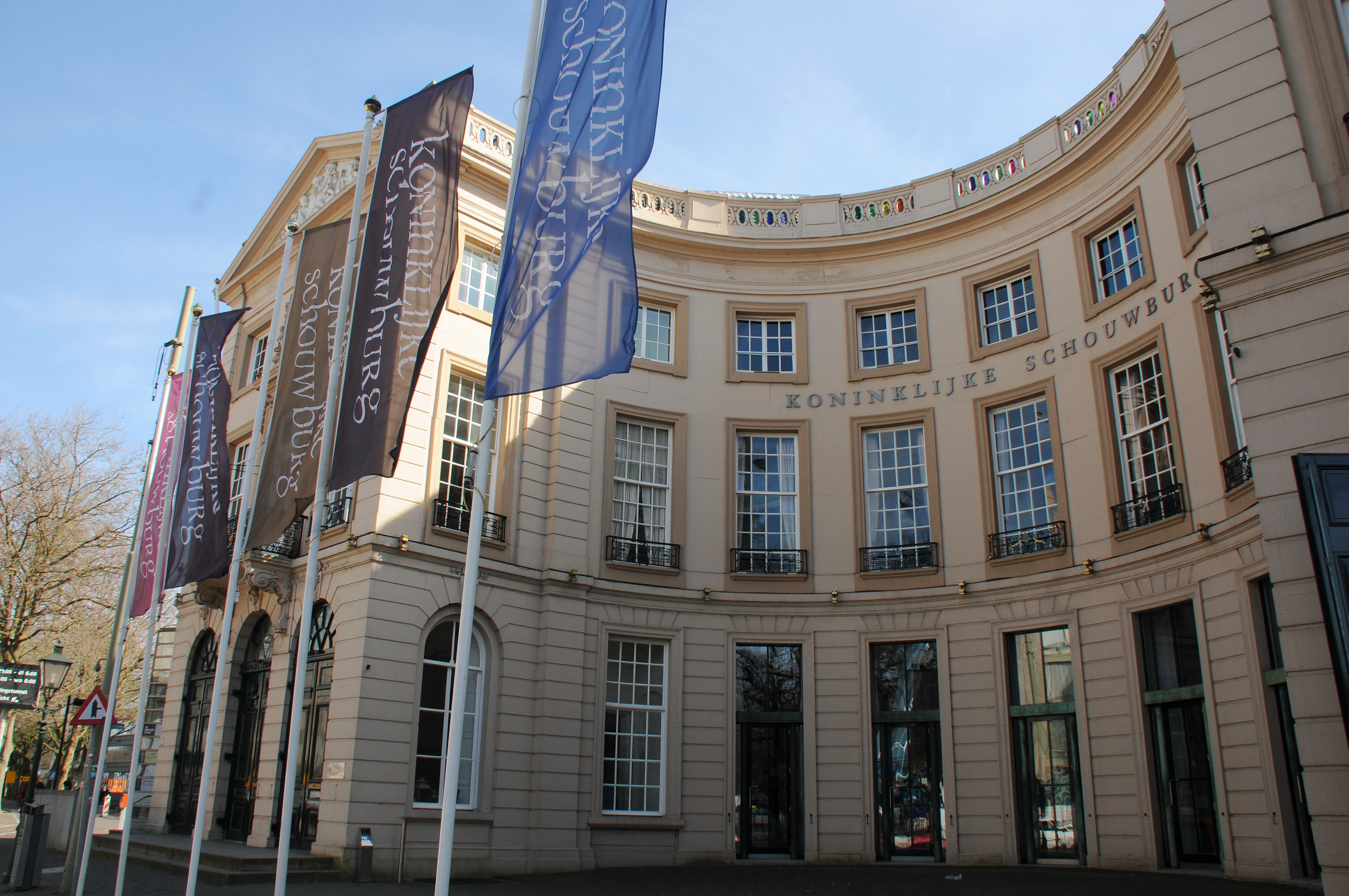

Het Nationale Theater (HNT) (English: The National Theater) is the main theater company of The Hague in the Netherlands.

Eric de Vroedt is artistic leader of the theater company.

Het Nationale Theater was created on 1 January 2017 (9 years ago) as a merger of Het Nationale Toneel (a theater company), the Koninklijke Schouwburg (the national theater building) and Theater aan het Spui (the city theater building). These three organizations worked together for several years under the name Toneelalliantie (English: Theatric Alliance), mostly active in The Hague.

Het Nationale Theater produces and presents classic plays, modern drama and actuality based programs, as well as cabaret, dance and music theater. The company is in 2018 one of the eight major theater companies subsidized by the national government and produces both for adults and youngsters (through NTjong). It is the largest traveling theater company from the Netherlands, although the Koninklijke Schouwburg and Theater aan het Spui function as its main locations.

== Actors ==
Het Nationale Theater has an ensemble of actors as employees, which consisted in 2017-2018 of:

- Saman Amini
- Jappe Claes
- Bram Coopmans
- Tamar van den Dop
- Sallie Harmsen
- Hein van der Heijden
- Hannah Hoekstra
- Antoinette Jelgersma
- Werner Kolf
- Vincent Linthorst
- Anniek Pheifer
- Mark Rietman
- Betty Schuurman
- Pieter van der Sman
- Joris Smit
- Jaap Spijkers
- Bram Suijker
- Romana Vrede
- Stefan de Walle
- Emmanuel Ohene Boafo
