= Eline Arbo =

Norwegian theatre director and playwright (born 1986)

- Born: 13 January 1986 (age 40); Tromsø, Norway
- Education: University of Oslo
- Years active: 2018–present

Eline Arbo (born 13 January 1986) is a Norwegian theatre director and playwright. As of 2023, she is Artistic Director of the Internationaal Theater Amsterdam (ITA). For the London production of The Years, which she adapted and directed, Arbo won the Laurence Olivier Award for Best Director.

== Early life ==
Arbo was born in Tromsø, her father a sociologist and her mother an artist. She graduated from the University of Oslo with a degree in Theatre Studies. She then took a directing course at the Academy of Theatre and Dance in Amsterdam. She also learned Dutch.

== Career ==
Arbo debut work was an adaptation of Johann Wolfgang Goethe's classic coming-of-age novel The Sorrows of Young Werther with Toneelschuur Producties. Its staging at the 2018 Dutch Theatre Festival won Arbo the 2018 BNG Bank Theatre Prize. In Norway, Arbo directed Henrik Ibsen's Hærmennene på Helgeland at the 2018 Ibsen Festival. This was followed in 2019 by Ibsen's Peer Gynt at Tromsø's Hålogaland Teater as well as The Revolutionaries, based on the ideas of Albert Camus, and Roland Schimmelpfennig's Black Water. She directed an adaptation of Édouard Louis' The End of Eddy. For the latter, she won VSCD Directors' Award at the 2020 Dutch Theatre Festival and the Theatre Viewers Award. She later brought The End of Eddy to the Edinburgh Fringe Festival. Also in 2020, Arbo directed Anton Chekhov's Three Sisters commissioned by Toneelschuur, for which she won the 2021 Mary Dresselhuys Prize.

In 2021, Arbo directed Friedrich Schiller's Mary Stuart at the Rogaland Teater in Stavanger and an adaptation of Michael Cunningham's The Hours (2021) (De Uren) at the ITA. She later made a Danish version of The Hours titled Timerne at the Royal Playhouse in Copenhagen. Arbo also adapted Charlotte Brontë's Jane Eyre for the National Theatre Oslo.

In 2022, Arbo adapted Annie Ernaux's memoir The Years for stage, which premiered at the Het Nationale Theater in The Hague. An English adaptation of The Years premiered at London's Almeida Theatre in 2024 before having a run at the Harold Pinter Theatre, marking Arbo's West End debut. For her direction, Arbo won the Laurence Olivier Award for Best Director. The production also received a nomination for Laurence Olivier Award for Best New Play among other accolades.

Arbo started working as an associate with Ivo van Hove, Artistic Director of the Internationaal Theater Amsterdam (ITA) in 2022. In 2023, Arbo was appointed Artistic Director of the ITA, taking over from van Hove, who had served in the position for 22 years. She was also appointed Ibsen Artist in Residence, supported by the Philip Loubser Foundation. Arbo's debut work with the ITA was Heinrich von Kleist's Penthesilea. This was followed by the Dutch production of Suzie Miller's Prima Facie, an adaptation of Lars von Trier's Melancholia in The Hague, and Connie Palmen's The Laws. She collaborated with the National Theatre Oslo on Haugtussa, incorporating the works of composer Edvard Greig.

== Artistry ==
Arbo's theatre-making style often takes an "innovative" approach to both classic works and more modern novels. She incorporates live music cues into her staging, making the plays she directs feel like "rock concerts", as well as elaborate sets.

== Personal life ==
Arbo is in a relationship with Dutch composer Thijs van Vuure.

== In media ==
Arbo was the subject of a 2025 short documentary film directed by Marjoleine Boonstra titled The Storm Within as part of the Ammodo Docs series.
