= 1995 Laurence Olivier Awards =

Edition of London theatre awards

The 1995 Laurence Olivier Awards were held in 1995 in London celebrating excellence in West End theatre by the Society of London Theatre.

== Winners and nominees ==
Details of winners (in bold) and nominees, in each award category, per the Society of London Theatre.

Play of the Year	Best New Musical
**Broken Glass by Arthur Miller – National Theatre Lyttelton / Duke of York's**; 900 Oneonta by David Beaird – Old Vic / Ambassadors; Dealer's Choice by Patrick Marber – National Theatre Cottesloe; Three Tall Women by Edward Albee – Wyndham's	**Once on This Island – Island**; Copacabana – Prince of Wales; Hot Shoe Shuffle – Queen's; The Roy Orbison Story: Only the Lonely – Piccadilly
Best Revival of a Play or Comedy	Best Musical Revival
**As You Like It – Albery**; Le Cid – National Theatre Cottesloe; Les Parents terribles – National Theatre Lyttelton; Sweet Bird of Youth – National Theatre Lyttelton / RSC at the Barbican	**She Loves Me – Savoy**; Oliver – London Palladium; The Card – Regent's Park Open Air; The Threepenny Opera – Donmar Warehouse
Best Comedy	Best Entertainment
**My Night with Reg by Kevin Elyot – Royal Court / Criterion**; Beautiful Thing by Jonathan Harvey – Donmar Warehouse / Duke of York's; Dead Funny by Terry Johnson – Vaudeville; Neville's Island by Tim Firth – Apollo	**Maria Friedman: By Special Arrangement – Donmar Warehouse**; Fascinating Aïda – Garrick; Jack: A Night on the Town with John Barrymore – Criterion; Juggle and Hyde – Criterion
Best Actor	Best Actress
**David Bamber as Guy in My Night with Reg – Royal Court / Criterion**; James Bolam as Shelly Levene in Glengarry Glen Ross – Donmar Warehouse; Adrian Lester as Rosalind in As You Like It – Albery; Bob Peck as John Rutherford in Rutherford and Son – National Theatre Cottesloe	**Clare Higgins as Alexandra Del Lago in Sweet Bird of Youth – National Theatre Lyttelton / RSC at the Barbican**; Frances de la Tour as Leo in Les Parents terribles – National Theatre Lyttelton; Sheila Gish as Yvonne in Les Parents terribles – National Theatre Lyttelton; Margot Leicester as Sylvia Gellburg in Broken Glass – National Theatre Lyttelton / Duke of York's
Best Actor in a Musical	Best Actress in a Musical
**John Gordon-Sinclair as Georg Nowack in She Loves Me – Savoy**; Peter Duncan as Denry Machin in The Card – Regent's Park Open Air; Tim Flavin as Bobby Child in Crazy for You – Prince Edward; Jonathan Pryce as Fagin in Oliver – London Palladium	**Ruthie Henshall as Amalia Balash in She Loves Me – Savoy**; Betty Buckley as Norma Desmond in Sunset Boulevard – Adelphi; Sally Dexter as Nancy in Oliver – London Palladium
Best Comedy Performance
**Niall Buggy as Brian in Dead Funny – Vaudeville**; Debra Gillett as Mrs. Margery Pinchwife in The Country Wife – RSC at The Pit; Nigel Hawthorne as Lord Ogleby in The Clandestine Marriage – Queen's; Tony Slattery as Gordon in Neville's Island – Apollo
Best Actor in a Supporting Role	Best Actress in a Supporting Role
**Ken Stott as Dr. Harry Hyman in Broken Glass – National Theatre Lyttelton / Duke of York's**; Simon Russell Beale as Ariel in The Tempest – RSC at the Barbican; Simon Coates as Celia in As You Like It – Albery; Trevor Peacock as Petey Boles in The Birthday Party – National Theatre Lyttelton	**Dora Bryan as Meg Boles in The Birthday Party – National Theatre Lyttelton**; Samantha Bond as Infanta Urraque in Le Cid – National Theatre Cottesloe; Brid Brennan as Janet in Rutherford and Son – National Theatre Cottesloe; Kathryn Hunter as Master of Play in Pericles – National Theatre Olivier
Best Supporting Performance in a Musical
**Tracie Bennett as Ilona Ritter in She Loves Me – Savoy**; Sharon D. Clarke as Asaka in Once on This Island – Island; Tara Hugo as Jenny in The Threepenny Opera – Donmar Warehouse; Berry Jones as Stephen Kodaly in She Loves Me – Savoy
Best Director of a Play	Best Director of a Musical
**Declan Donnellan for As You Like It – Albery**; Sean Mathias for Les Parents terribles – National Theatre Lyttelton; Simon McBurney for The Three Lives of Lucie Cabrol – Shaftesbury; Katie Mitchell for Ghosts – RSC at the Barbican Pit	**Scott Ellis for She Loves Me – Savoy**; Gwenda Hughes and David Toguri for Once on This Island – Island; Sam Mendes for Oliver – London Palladium
Best Theatre Choreographer
**David Atkins and Dein Perry for Hot Shoe Shuffle – Queen's**; Jonathan Lunn for Pericles – National Theatre Olivier; Rob Marshall for She Loves Me – Savoy; David Toguri for Once on This Island – Island
Best Set Designer	Best Costume Designer
**Stephen Brimson Lewis for Design for Living – Donmar Warehouse / Gielgud and Les Parents terribles – National Theatre Lyttelton**; Lez Brotherston for Neville's Island – Apollo; Peter J. Davison for Le Cid – National Theatre Cottesloe and Saint Joan – Strand; Anthony Ward for Sweet Bird of Youth – National Theatre Lyttelton / RSC at the Barbican	**Deirdre Clancy for A Month in the Country – Albery and Love's Labour's Lost – RSC at the Barbican**; Stephen Brimson Lewis for Design for Living – Donmar Warehouse / Gielgud and Les Parents terribles – National Theatre Lyttelton; David Charles and Jane Greenwood for She Loves Me – Savoy; Clare Mitchell for Le Cid – National Theatre Cottesloe and Saint Joan – Strand
Best Lighting Designer
**Mark Henderson for his work this season**; Rick Fisher for Pericles – National Theatre Olivier and The Cryptogram – Ambassador's; David Hersey for Glengarry Glen Ross – Donmar Warehouse and Oliver – London Palladium; Tina MacHugh for Ghosts – RSC at the Barbican Pit and Rutherford and Son – National Theatre Cottesloe
Outstanding Achievement in Dance	Best New Dance Production
**Peter Mumford for lighting Fearful Symmetries, The Royal Ballet – Royal Opera House and The Glass Blew In, Siobhan Davies Dance Company – Sadler's Wells**; Thomas Edur in The Sleeping Beauty, English National Ballet – Royal Festival Hall; John Macfarlane for set designing The Nutcracker, Birmingham Royal Ballet – London Coliseum; Nuria Moreno in Cinderella, Lindsay Kemp and Company – Sadler's Wells	**Fearful Symmetries, The Royal Ballet – Royal Opera House**; Hommage aux Ballets Russes, Le Ballet Preljocaj – Sadler's Wells; Sueños Flamencos, Ballet Cristina Hoyos – Sadler's Wells; The Nutcracker, Birmingham Royal Ballet – London Coliseum
Outstanding Achievement in Opera	Outstanding New Opera Production
**Roberto Alagna in Roméo et Juliette, The Royal Opera – Royal Opera House**; Tom Cairns for directing and set designing King Priam, English National Opera – London Coliseum; La traviata, Music Theatre London – Donmar Warehouse; John Tomlinson in Das Rheingold and Die Walküre, The Royal Opera – Royal Opera House	**Khovanshchina, English National Opera – London Coliseum**; Così fan tutte, The Royal Opera – Royal Opera House; Don Quixote, English National Opera – London Coliseum; Roméo et Juliette, The Royal Opera – Royal Opera House

== Productions with multiple nominations and awards ==
The following 24 productions, including two ballets and one opera, received multiple nominations:

- 8: She Loves Me
- 6: Les Parents terribles
- 5: Oliver
- 4: As You Like It, Le Cid and Once on This Island
- 3: Broken Glass, Neville's Island, Pericles, Rutherford and Son and Sweet Bird of Youth
- 2: Dead Funny, Design for Living, Fearful Symmetries, Ghosts, Glengarry Glen Ross, Hot Shoe Shuffle, My Night with Reg, Roméo et Juliette, Saint Joan, The Birthday Party, The Card, The Nutcracker and The Threepenny Opera

The following five productions, including one ballet, received multiple awards:

- 5: She Loves Me
- 2: As You Like It, Broken Glass, Fearful Symmetries and My Night with Reg

== See also ==
- 49th Tony Awards
