= 1992 Laurence Olivier Awards =

Edition of London theatre awards

The 1992 Laurence Olivier Awards were held in 1992 in London celebrating excellence in West End theatre by the Society of London Theatre.

== Winners and nominees ==
Details of winners (in bold) and nominees, in each award category, per the Society of London Theatre.

Play of the Year	Best New Musical
**Death and the Maiden by Ariel Dorfman – Royal Court / Duke of York's**; Angels in America by Tony Kushner – National Theatre Cottesloe; The Madness of George III by Alan Bennett – National Theatre Lyttelton; Three Birds Alighting on a Field by Timberlake Wertenbaker – Royal Court	**Carmen Jones – Old Vic**; The Phantom of the Opera – Shaftesbury
Best Revival of a Play or Comedy	Best Musical Revival
**Hedda Gabler – Playhouse**; Faith Healer – Royal Court; The Comedy of Errors – RSC at the Barbican; Uncle Vanya – National Theatre Cottesloe	**The Boys from Syracuse – Regent's Park Open Air**; Joseph and the Amazing Technicolor Dreamcoat – London Palladium
Best Comedy	Best Entertainment
**La Bête by David Hirson – Lyric Hammersmith**; An Evening with Gary Lineker by Chris England and Arthur Smith – Duchess; It's Ralph by Hugh Whitemore – Comedy	**Talking Heads – Comedy**; A Tribute to the Blues Brothers – Whitehall; Kit and The Widow: Lavishly Mounted – Ambassadors; Tango Argentino – Aldwych
Actor of the Year	Actress of the Year
**Nigel Hawthorne as George III in The Madness of George III – National Theatre Lyttelton**; Marcus D'Amico as Louis Ironson in Angels in America – National Theatre Cottesloe; Robert Lindsay as Henry II in Becket – Theatre Royal Haymarket; Ian McKellen as Vanya Petrovich Voynitsky in Uncle Vanya – National Theatre Cottesloe	**Juliet Stevenson as Paulina Salas in Death and the Maiden – Royal Court / Duke of York's**; Janet McTeer as Yelena Andreyevna Serebryakova in Uncle Vanya – National Theatre Cottesloe; Patricia Routledge as Miss Schofield in Talking Heads – Comedy; Fiona Shaw as Hedda Gabler Tesman in Hedda Gabler – Playhouse
Best Actor in a Musical	Best Actress in a Musical
**Alan Bennett as Graham Whittaker in Talking Heads – Comedy**; Philip Bird as Performer in Good Rockin' Tonite – Strand; Jason Donovan as Joseph in Joseph and the Amazing Technicolor Dreamcoat – London Palladium; Damon Evans as Joe in Carmen Jones – Old Vic	**Wilhelmenia Fernandez as Carmen Jones in Carmen Jones – Old Vic**; Sharon Benson as Carmen Jones in Carmen Jones – Old Vic; Linzi Hateley as The Narrator in Joseph and the Amazing Technicolor Dreamcoat – London Palladium; Miriam Margolyes as Various in Dickens' Women – Duke of York's
Best Comedy Performance
**Desmond Barrit as Antipholus of Ephesus and Antipholus of Syracuse in The Comedy of Errors – RSC at the Barbican**; Robin Bailey as Ivan Vassilevich in Black Snow – National Theatre Cottesloe; Alan Cumming as Valere in La Bête – Lyric Theatre Hammersmith; Lia Williams as Karen Knightly in The Revengers' Comedies – Strand
Best Actor in a Supporting Role	Best Actress in a Supporting Role
**Oleg Menshikov as Sergei Yesenin in When She Danced – Globe**; Simon Russell Beale as Thersites in Troilus and Cressida – RSC at The Pit; Henry Goodman as Roy Cohn in Angels in America – National Theatre Cottesloe; Ken Stott as Sergeant Kite in The Recruiting Officer – National Theatre Olivier	**Frances de la Tour as Miss Belzer in When She Danced – Globe**; Eileen Atkins as Hannah Jelkes in The Night of the Iguana – National Theatre Lyttelton; Clare Higgins as Amalia Jovine in Napoli milionaria – National Theatre Lyttelton; Lesley Sharp as Sonya Alexandrovna Serebryakova in Uncle Vanya – National Theatre Cottesloe
Best Supporting Performance in a Musical
**Jenny Galloway as Luce in The Boys from Syracuse – Regent's Park Open Air**; Gregg Baker as Frankie in Carmen Jones – Old Vic; Karen Parks as Myrt in Carmen Jones – Old Vic; Martin Smith as Soloist in A Swell Party – Vaudeville
Best Director of a Play	Best Director of a Musical
**Deborah Warner for Hedda Gabler – Playhouse**; Declan Donnellan for Angels in America – National Theatre Cottesloe; Ian Judge for The Comedy of Errors – RSC at the Barbican; Sean Mathias for Uncle Vanya – National Theatre Cottesloe	**Simon Callow for Carmen Jones – Old Vic**; Judi Dench for The Boys from Syracuse – Regent's Park Open Air; Ken Hill for The Phantom of the Opera – Shaftesbury; Steven Pimlott for Joseph and the Amazing Technicolor Dreamcoat – London Palladium
Best Theatre Choreographer
**Rafael Aguilar for Matador – Queen's**; Steven Berkoff for The Trial – National Theatre Lyttelton; The ensemble for Tango Argentino – Aldwych; Anthony Van Laast for Joseph and the Amazing Technicolor Dreamcoat – London Palladium
Best Set Designer	Best Costume Designer
**Mark Thompson for Joseph and the Amazing Technicolor Dreamcoat – London Palladium and The Comedy of Errors – RSC at the Barbican**; Bob Crowley for Murmuring Judges – National Theatre Olivier, The Night of the Iguana – National Theatre Lyttelton and When She Danced – Globe; Ashley Martin-Davis for The Miser and The Recruiting Officer – National Theatre Olivier; Philip Prowse for A Woman of No Importance – RSC at the Barbican and The White Devil – National Theatre Olivier	**Mark Thompson for The Comedy of Errors – RSC at the Barbican**; Ashley Martin-Davis for The Miser – National Theatre Olivier; James Merifield for The Boys from Syracuse – Regent's Park Open Air; Philip Prowse for A Woman of No Importance – RSC at the Barbican
Best Lighting Designer
**Mark Henderson for Long Day's Journey into Night – National Theatre Lyttelton and Murmuring Judges – National Theatre Olivier**; Wayne Dowdeswell for Edward II – RSC at The Pit; Jean Kalman for Hedda Gabler – Playhouse and The Night of the Iguana – National Theatre Lyttelton; Sumio Yoshii for Tango at the End of Winter – Piccadilly
Outstanding Achievement of the Year in Dance	Outstanding Achievement in Opera
**William Forsythe for choreographing and performing in In the Middle, Somewhat Elevated, The Royal Ballet – Royal Opera House**; Adventures in Motion Pictures for most promising small dance company to present a West End season – Royal Court; Christopher Gable for his vital and imaginative Romeo and Juliet, Northern Ballet Theatre – Royalty; Phillipe Genty for his imaginative visual presentation, Driftings – Sadler's Wells; Stephen Jefferies in Cyrano, The Royal Ballet – Royal Opera House; Graham Lustig for choreographing and Henk Schut for set designing Inscape, Birmingham Royal Ballet – Royal Opera House	**Mitridate, re di Ponto, The Royal Opera – Royal Opera House**; Harrison Birtwistle in Gawain, The Royal Opera – Royal Opera House; Simon Boccanegra, The Royal Opera – Royal Opera House; Out of Season, English National Opera – London Coliseum; Out of Season and The Dancer Hotoke, The Garden Venture – Riverside Studios; Peter Grimes, English National Opera – London Coliseum
Award for Outstanding Achievement
**Damned for Despair and The Great Pretenders – Gate**; Steven Berkoff for writing Kvetch – Garrick; Danny Boyle for producing The Last Days of Don Juan – RSC at the Barbican Pit; Gaudeamus, Maly Theatre – London International Festival; Vanessa Redgrave in When She Danced – Globe; Bandō Tamasaburō V whose grace and poetry delighted audiences including his world-famous representation of a maiden transformed into a dying heron in a snowstorm, Japan Festival – National Theatre
Society Special Award
**Ninette de Valois**

== Productions with multiple nominations and awards ==
The following 18 productions received multiple nominations:

- 7: Carmen Jones
- 6: Joseph and the Amazing Technicolor Dreamcoat
- 5: The Comedy of Errors and Uncle Vanya
- 4: Angels in America, Hedda Gabler, The Boys from Syracuse and When She Danced
- 3: Talking Heads and The Night of the Iguana
- 2: A Woman of No Importance, Death and the Maiden, Murmuring Judges, Tango Argentino, The Madness of George III, The Miser, The Phantom of the Opera and The Recruiting Officer

The following eight productions received multiple awards:

- 3: Carmen Jones and The Comedy of Errors
- 2: Death and the Maiden, Hedda Gabler, La Bête, Talking Heads, The Boys from Syracuse and When She Danced

== See also ==
- 46th Tony Awards
