= Laurence Olivier Award for Best New Musical =

Annual award for London theatre

- Awarded for: Best New Musical
- Location: England
- Presented by: Society of London Theatre
- First award: 1976
- Currently held by: Paddington: The Musical (2026)
- Website: officiallondontheatre.com/olivier-awards/

The Laurence Olivier Award for Best New Musical is an annual award presented by the Society of London Theatre in recognition of the "world-class status of London theatre." The awards were established as the Society of West End Theatre Awards in 1976, and renamed in 1984 in honour of English actor and director Laurence Olivier.

== Winners and nominees ==
=== 1970s ===
Year	Musical	Book	Music	Lyrics
1976
1976	A Chorus Line	James Kirkwood and Nicholas Dante	Marvin Hamlisch	Edward Kleban
1976	Ipi Tombi	Bertha Egnos		Gail Lakier
1976	Side by Side by Sondheim	Ned Sherrin	Various Artists	Stephen Sondheim
1976	Very Good Eddie	Philip Bartholomae and Guy Bolton	Jerome Kern	Schuyler Green and Herbert Reynolds
1977
1977	The Comedy of Errors	Trevor Nunn	Guy Woolfenden	Trevor Nunn
1977	Bubbling Brown Sugar	Loften Mitchell	Eubie Blake	
1977	I Love My Wife	Michael Stewart	Cy Coleman	Michael Stewart
1977	Something's Afoot	James MacDonald, Davis Vos and Robert Gerlach		
1978
1978	Evita	Tim Rice	Andrew Lloyd Webber	Tim Rice
1978	Annie	Thomas Meehan	Charles Strouse	Martin Charnin
1978	Elvis	Jack Good and Ray Cooney	Various Artists	
1979
1979	Songbook	Monty Norman and Julian More	Monty Norman	Monty Norman and Julian More
1979	Ain't Misbehavin'	Murray Horwitz and Richard Maltby Jr.	Fats Waller	Various Artists
1979	Bar Mitzvah Boy	Jack Rosenthal	Jule Styne	Don Black
1979	Chicago	Fred Ebb and Bob Fosse	John Kander	Fred Ebb

=== 1980s ===
Year	Musical	Book	Music	Lyrics
1980
1980	Sweeney Todd	Hugh Wheeler	Stephen Sondheim	
1980	They're Playing Our Song	Neil Simon	Marvin Hamlisch	Carole Bayer Sager
1980	Tom Foolery	Cameron Mackintosh	Tom Lehrer	
1980	On the Twentieth Century	Betty Comden and Adolph Green	Cy Coleman	Betty Comden and Adolph Green
1981
1981	Cats	Trevor Nunn	Andrew Lloyd Webber	T. S. Eliot
1981	Barnum	Mark Bramble	Cy Coleman	Michael Stewart
1981	One Mo' Time	Vernel Bagneris	Various Artists	
1981	The Best Little Whorehouse in Texas	Larry L. King and Peter Masterson	Carol Hall	
1982
1982	Poppy	Peter Nichols	Monty Norman	Peter Nichols
1982	Andy Capp	Trevor Peacock	Alan Price	Trevor Peacock and Alan Price
1982	Underneath the Arches	Patrick Garland, Brian Glanville and Roy Hudd	Various Artists	
1982	Windy City	Dick Vosburgh	Tony Macaulay	Dick Vosburgh
1983
1983	Blood Brothers	Willy Russell		
1983	Bashville	Benny Green and David William	Denis King	Benny Green
1983	Little Shop of Horrors	Howard Ashman	Alan Menken	Howard Ashman
1983	Snoopy	Warren Lockhart, Arthur Whitelaw and Michael Grace	Larry Grossman	Hal Hackady
1984
1984	42nd Street	Michael Stewart and Mark Bramble	Harry Warren	Al Dubin
1984	The Hired Man	Melvyn Bragg	Howard Goodall	
1984	Pump Boys and Dinettes	Various Artists		
1984	Starlight Express	Trevor Nunn	Andrew Lloyd Webber	Richard Stilgoe
1985
1985	Me and My Girl	L. Arthur Rose and Douglas Furber	Noel Gay	L. Arthur Rose and Douglas Furber
1985	Les Misérables	Alain Boublil and Claude-Michel Schönberg	Claude-Michel Schönberg	Alain Boublil and Herbert Kretzmer
1986
1986	The Phantom of the Opera	Andrew Lloyd Webber and Richard Stilgoe	Andrew Lloyd Webber	Charles Hart and Richard Stilgoe
1986	Chess	Richard Nelson	Benny Andersson and Björn Ulvaeus	Tim Rice and Björn Ulvaeus
1986	H.M.S. Pinafore	Bill Whelan	Arthur Sullivan	W. S. Gilbert
1986	Wonderful Town	Joseph A. Fields and Jerome Chodorov	Leonard Bernstein	Betty Comden and Adolph Green
1987
1987	Follies	James Goldman	Stephen Sondheim	
1987	Blues in the Night	Sheldon Epps	Various Artists	
1987	Kiss Me, Kate	Samuel and Bella Spewack	Cole Porter	
1987	Up on the Roof	Simon Moore and Jane Prowse	Various Artists	
1988
1988	Candide	Hugh Wheeler	Leonard Bernstein	Richard Wilbur and Stephen Sondheim
1988	Babes in Arms	Richard Rodgers and Lorenz Hart	Richard Rodgers	Lorenz Hart
1988	Blood Brothers	Willy Russell		
1988	The Wizard of Oz	John Kane	Harold Arlen and Herbert Stothart	E. Y. Harburg
1989/90
1989/90	Return to the Forbidden Planet	Bob Carlton		
1989/90	The Baker's Wife	Joseph Stein	Stephen Schwartz	
1989/90	Buddy – The Buddy Holly Story	Alan Janes	Various Artists	
1989/90	Miss Saigon	Claude-Michel Schönberg and Alain Boublil	Claude-Michel Schönberg	Alain Boublil and Richard Maltby Jr.

=== 1990s ===
Year	Musical	Book	Music	Lyrics
1991
1991	Sunday in the Park with George	James Lapine	Stephen Sondheim	
1991	Into the Woods	James Lapine	Stephen Sondheim	
1992
1992	Carmen Jones	Oscar Hammerstein II	Bizet	Oscar Hammerstein II
1992	Phantom of the Opera	Ken Hill		
1993
1993	Crazy for You	Ken Ludwig	George and Ira Gershwin	
1993	Assassins	John Weidman	Stephen Sondheim	
1993	Grand Hotel	Luther Davis	Robert Wright, George Forrest and Maury Yeston	
1993	Kiss of the Spider Woman	Terrence McNally	John Kander	Fred Ebb
1994
1994	City of Angels	Larry Gelbart	Cy Coleman	David Zippel
1994	Sunset Boulevard	Don Black and Christopher Hampton	Andrew Lloyd Webber	Don Black and Christopher Hampton
1995
1995	Once on This Island	Lynn Ahrens	Stephen Flaherty	Lynn Ahrens
1995	Copacabana	Barry Manilow and Bruce Sussman	Barry Manilow	Bruce Sussman and Jack Feldman
1995	Hot Shoe Shuffle	Larry Buttrose and Kathryn Riding	Various Artists	
1995	Only the Lonely, The Roy Orbison Story	Shirlie Roden and Jon Miller	Keith Strachan	
1996
1996	Jolson	Francis Essex and Rob Bettinson		
1996	Fame	José Fernandez	Steve Margoshes	Jacques Levy
1996	Hot Mikado	David H. Bell	Rob Bowman	David H. Bell
1996	Mack & Mabel	Michael Stewart	Jerry Herman	
1997
1997	Martin Guerre	Claude-Michel Schönberg and Alain Boublil	Claude-Michel Schönberg	Claude-Michel Schönberg and Alain Boublil
1997	Nine	Arthur Kopit	Maury Yeston	
1997	Passion	James Lapine	Stephen Sondheim	
1998
1998	Beauty and the Beast	Linda Woolverton	Alan Menken	Howard Ashman and Tim Rice
1998	Enter the Guardsman	Scott Wentworth	Craig Bohmler	Marion Adler
1998	The Fix	John Dempsey	Dana P. Rowe	John Dempsey
1998	Lady in the Dark	Moss Hart	Kurt Weill	Ira Gershwin
1999
1999	Kat and the Kings	David Kramer	Taliep Petersen	David Kramer
1999	Rent	Jonathan Larson		
1999	Saturday Night Fever	Various Writers	Bee Gees	
1999	Whistle Down the Wind	Patricia Knop, Andrew Lloyd Webber and Gale Edwards	Andrew Lloyd Webber	Jim Steinman

=== 2000s ===
Year	Musical	Book	Music	Lyrics
2000
2000	Honk!	Anthony Drewe	George Stiles	Anthony Drewe
2000	Mamma Mia!	Catherine Johnson	Benny Andersson and Björn Ulvaeus	
2000	Spend Spend Spend	Steve Brown and Justin Greene	Steve Brown	Steve Brown and Justin Greene
2000	The Lion King	Roger Allers and Irene Mecchi	Elton John	Tim Rice
2001
2001	Merrily We Roll Along	George Furth	Stephen Sondheim	
2001	Fosse	Richard Maltby Jr. and Ann Reinking	Various Artists	
2001	The Beautiful Game	Ben Elton	Andrew Lloyd Webber	Ben Elton
2001	The Witches of Eastwick	John Dempsey	Dana P. Rowe	John Dempsey
2003
2003	Our House	Tim Firth	Madness	
2003	Bombay Dreams	Meera Syal	A. R. Rahman	Don Black
2003	Chitty Chitty Bang Bang	Jeremy Sams	Richard M. Sherman and Robert B. Sherman	
2003	Taboo	Mark Davies Markham	Boy George	
2004
2004	Jerry Springer	Stewart Lee and Richard Thomas		
2004	Ragtime	Terrence McNally	Stephen Flaherty	Lynn Ahrens
2004	Thoroughly Modern Millie	Richard Morris and Dick Scanlan	Jeanine Tesori	Dick Scanlan
2005
2005	The Producers	Mel Brooks and Thomas Meehan	Mel Brooks	
2005	Mary Poppins	Julian Fellowes	Richard M. Sherman, Robert B. Sherman, George Stiles and Anthony Drewe	
2005	The Woman in White	Charlotte Jones	Andrew Lloyd Webber	David Zippel
2006
2006	Billy Elliot	Lee Hall	Elton John	Lee Hall
2006	Acorn Antiques	Victoria Wood		
2006	The Big Life	Paul Sirett	Paul Joseph	Paul Sirett
2007
2007	Caroline, or Change	Tony Kushner	Jeanine Tesori	Tony Kushner
2007	Avenue Q	Jeff Whitty	Robert Lopez and Jeff Marx	
2007	Spamalot	Eric Idle	John Du Prez and Eric Idle	Eric Idle
2007	Porgy and Bess	DuBose Heyward	George Gershwin	DuBose Heyward and Ira Gershwin
2008
2008	Hairspray	Mark O'Donnell and Thomas Meehan	Marc Shaiman	Scott Wittman and Marc Shaiman
2008	The Drowsy Chaperone	Bob Martin and Don McKellar	Lisa Lambert and Greg Morrison	
2008	The Lord of the Rings	Shaun McKenna and Matthew Warchus	A. R. Rahman, Värttinä and Christopher Nightingale	Shaun McKenna and Matthew Warchus
2008	Parade	Alfred Uhry	Jason Robert Brown	
2009
2009	Jersey Boys	Marshall Brickman and Rick Elice	Bob Gaudio	Bob Crewe
2009	Zorro	Stephen Clark and Helen Edmundson	Gipsy Kings and John Cameron	Stephen Clark

=== 2010s ===
Year	Musical	Book	Music	Lyrics
2010
2010	Spring Awakening	Steven Sater	Duncan Sheik	Steven Sater
2010	Dreamboats and Petticoats	Laurence Marks and Maurice Gran	Various Artists	
2010	Priscilla, Queen of the Desert	Stephan Elliott and Allan Scott	Various Artists	
2010	Sister Act	Cheri and Bill Steinkellner	Alan Menken	Glenn Slater
2011
2011	Legally Blonde	Heather Hach	Laurence O'Keefe and Nell Benjamin	
2011	Fela!	Bill T. Jones and Jim Lewis	Fela Kuti	
2011	Love Never Dies	Andrew Lloyd Webber and Ben Elton	Andrew Lloyd Webber	Glenn Slater
2011	Love Story	Stephen Clark	Howard Goodall	Stephen Clark and Howard Goodall
2012
2012	Matilda	Dennis Kelly	Tim Minchin	
2012	Betty Blue Eyes	Ron Cowen and Daniel Lipman	George Stiles	Anthony Drewe
2012	Ghost	Bruce Joel Rubin	Dave Stewart and Glen Ballard	Dave Stewart, Glen Ballard and Bruce Joel Rubin
2012	London Road	Alecky Blythe	Adam Cork	Alecky Blythe and Adam Cork
2012	Shrek	David Lindsay-Abaire	Jeanine Tesori	David Lindsay-Abaire
2013
2013	Top Hat	Matthew White and Howard Jacques	Irving Berlin	
2013	Loserville	James Bourne and Elliot Davis		
2013	Soul Sister	John Miller and Pete Brooks	Various Artists	
2013	The Bodyguard	Alexander Dinelaris	Various Artists	
2014
2014	The Book of Mormon	Trey Parker, Robert Lopez and Matt Stone		
2014	Charlie and the Chocolate Factory	David Greig	Marc Shaiman and Scott Wittman	
2014	Once	Enda Walsh	Glen Hansard and Markéta Irglová	
2014	The Scottsboro Boys	David Thompson	John Kander	Fred Ebb
2015
2015	Sunny Afternoon	Joe Penhall	Ray Davies	
2015	Beautiful: The Carole King Musical	Douglas McGrath	Gerry Goffin, Carole King, Barry Mann and Cynthia Weil	
2015	Here Lies Love	David Byrne	David Byrne and Fatboy Slim	David Byrne
2015	Memphis	Joe DiPietro	David Bryan	David Bryan and Joe DiPietro
2016
2016	Kinky Boots	Harvey Fierstein	Cyndi Lauper	
2016	Bend It Like Beckham	Gurinder Chadha and Paul Mayeda Berges	Howard Goodall	Charles Hart
2016	In the Heights	Quiara Alegría Hudes	Lin-Manuel Miranda	
2016	Mrs Henderson Presents	Terry Johnson	George Fenton and Simon Chamberlin	Don Black
2017
2017	Groundhog Day	Danny Rubin	Tim Minchin	
2017	Dreamgirls	Tom Eyen	Henry Krieger	Tom Eyen
2017	The Girls	Tim Firth and Gary Barlow		
2017	School of Rock	Julian Fellowes	Andrew Lloyd Webber	Glenn Slater
2018
2018	Hamilton	Lin-Manuel Miranda		
2018	An American in Paris	Craig Lucas	George Gershwin	Ira Gershwin
2018	Everybody's Talking About Jamie	Tom MacRae	Dan Gillespie Sells	Tom MacRae
2018	Girl from the North Country	Conor McPherson	Bob Dylan	
2018	Young Frankenstein	Mel Brooks and Thomas Meehan	Mel Brooks	
2019
2019	Come from Away	David Hein and Irene Sankoff		
2019	Fun Home	Lisa Kron	Jeanine Tesori	Lisa Kron
2019	Six	Toby Marlow and Lucy Moss		
2019	Tina	Katori Hall, Frank Ketelaar and Kees Prins	Tina Turner	

=== 2020s ===
Year	Musical	Book	Music	Lyrics
2020	Dear Evan Hansen	Steven Levenson	Justin Paul	Benj Pasek
2020	& Juliet	David West Read	Max Martin	
2020	Amélie	Craig Lucas	Daniel Messé	Daniel Messé and Nathan Tysen
2020	Waitress	Jessie Nelson	Sara Bareilles	
2021	Not presented due to extended closing of theatre productions during COVID-19 pandemic (Note: Due to late March 2020 to late July 2021 closing of London theatre productions during the COVID-19 pandemic in England, the 2022 awards recognise productions that launched anytime from February 2020 to February 2022)			
2022	Back to the Future: The Musical	Bob Gale and Robert Zemeckis	Alan Silvestri	Glen Ballard
2022	The Drifters Girl	Ed Curtis and Tina Treadwell	Various Artists	
2022	Frozen	Jennifer Lee	Kristen Anderson-Lopez and Robert Lopez	
2022	Get Up, Stand Up! The Bob Marley Musical	Lee Hall	Bob Marley	
2022	Moulin Rouge! The Musical	John Logan	Various Artists	
2023	Standing at the Sky's Edge	Chris Bush	Richard Hawley	
2023	The Band's Visit	Itamar Moses	David Yazbek	
2023	Sylvia	Kate Prince and Priya Parmar	Kate Prince	Josh Cohen and DJ Walde
2023	Tammy Faye	James Graham	Elton John	Jake Shears
2024	Operation Mincemeat	David Cumming, Felix Hagan, Natasha Hodgson and Zoë Roberts		
2024	The Little Big Things	Joe White	Nick Butcher	Nick Butcher & Tom Ling
2024	Next to Normal	Brian Yorkey	Tom Kitt	Brian Yorkey
2024	A Strange Loop	Michael R. Jackson		
2025
2025	The Curious Case of Benjamin Button	Jethro Compton	Darren Clark and Jethro Compton	Darren Clark
2025	MJ the Musical	Lynn Nottage	Various Artists	
2025	Natasha, Pierre & The Great Comet of 1812	Dave Malloy		
2025	Why Am I So Single?	Toby Marlow and Lucy Moss		
2026
2026	Paddington: The Musical	Jessica Swale	Tom Fletcher	
2026	Here We Are	David Ives	Stephen Sondheim	
2026	Shucked	Robert Horn	Brandy Clark and Shane McAnally	
2026	The Unlikely Pilgrimage Of Harold Fry	Rachel Joyce	Passenger	

== Multiple awards and nominations for Best New Musical ==
=== Awards ===
==== Five awards ====
- Stephen Sondheim

==== Three awards ====
- Andrew Lloyd Webber

==== Two awards ====
- Thomas Meehan
- Tim Minchin
- Trevor Nunn
- Tim Rice
- Hugh Wheeler

=== Nominations ===
==== Ten nominations ====
- Stephen Sondheim
- Andrew Lloyd Webber

==== Four nominations ====
- Don Black
- Cy Coleman
- Thomas Meehan
- Michael Stewart
- Jeanine Tesori

==== Three nominations ====
- Alain Boublil
- Fred Ebb
- Anthony Drewe
- Howard Goodall
- Elton John
- John Kander
- James Lapine
- Robert Lopez
- Richard Maltby Jr.
- Claude-Michel Schönberg
- Glenn Slater
- Alan Menken
- George Stiles
- Trevor Nunn
- Tim Rice

==== Two nominations ====
- Howard Ashman
- Benny Andersson
- Glen Ballard
- Leonard Bernstein
- Mark Bramble
- Mel Brooks
- Betty Comden
- Ben Elton
- Julian Fellowes
- Tim Firth
- Adolph Green
- Lee Hall
- Marvin Hamlisch
- Charles Hart
- Craig Lucas
- Lin-Manuel Miranda
- Toby Marlow
- Terrence McNally
- Tim Minchin
- Lucy Moss
- Willy Russell (nominated for Blood Brothers in 1983 and 1983 as "Musical of the Year" before the award for Best Musical Revival was introduced in 1991)
- Richard M. Sherman
- Robert B. Sherman
- Richard Stilgoe
- Björn Ulvaeus
- Hugh Wheeler

== See also ==
- Critics' Circle Theatre Award for Best Musical
- Drama Desk Award for Outstanding Musical
- Evening Standard Theatre Award for Best Musical
- Tony Award for Best Musical
