= Laurence Olivier Award for Best Director of a Musical =

Retired award for London theatre

- Awarded for: Best Director of a Musical
- Location: England
- Presented by: Society of London Theatre
- First award: 1991
- Final award: 1995
- Website: officiallondontheatre.com/olivier-awards/

The Laurence Olivier Award for Best Director of a Musical was an annual award presented by the Society of London Theatre in recognition of the "world-class status of London theatre." The awards were established as the Society of West End Theatre Awards in 1976, and renamed in 1984 in honour of English actor and director Laurence Olivier.

This award was introduced in 1991, along with Best Director of a Play, when the original (and singular) Best Director award was divided. The new pair of awards were last presented in 1995, after which the original Best Director award returned to the roster of Olivier Awards.

== Winners and nominees ==
=== 1990s ===
Year	Director	Production
1991
1991	Richard Jones	Into the Woods
1991	Charles Augins	Five Guys Named Moe
1991	Ian Judge	Show Boat
1991	Steven Pimlott	Sunday in the Park with George
1992
1992	Simon Callow	Carmen Jones
1992	Judi Dench	The Boys from Syracuse
1992	Ken Hill	The Phantom of the Opera
1992	Steven Pimlott	Joseph and the Amazing Technicolor Dreamcoat
1993
1993	Nicholas Hytner	Carousel
1993	Sam Mendes	Assassins
1993	Mike Ockrent	Crazy for You
1993	Harold Prince	Kiss of the Spider Woman
1994
1994	Declan Donnellan	Sweeney Todd: The Demon Barber of Fleet Street
1994	Michael Blakemore	City of Angels
1994	John Caird	The Beggar's Opera
1994	Sam Mendes	Cabaret
1995
1995	Scott Ellis	She Loves Me
1995	Sam Mendes	Oliver!
1995	David Toguri and Gwenda Hughes	Once on This Island

== See also ==
- Drama Desk Award for Outstanding Director of a Musical
- Tony Award for Best Direction of a Musical
