= 1991 Laurence Olivier Awards =

Edition of London theatre awards

The 1991 Laurence Olivier Awards were held in 1991 in London celebrating excellence in West End theatre by the Society of London Theatre.

== Winners and nominees ==
Details of winners (in bold) and nominees, in each award category, per the Society of London Theatre.

Play of the Year	Best New Musical
**Dancing at Lughnasa by Brian Friel – National Theatre Lyttelton**; Singer by Peter Flannery – RSC at the Barbican Pit; The Trackers of Oxyrhynchus by Tony Harrison – National Theatre Olivier; White Chameleon by Christopher Hampton – National Theatre Cottesloe	**Sunday in the Park with George – National Theatre Lyttelton**; Into the Woods – Phoenix
Best Revival of a Play or Comedy	Best Musical Revival
**Pericles – RSC at the Barbican Pit**; Accidental Death of an Anarchist – National Theatre Cottesloe; Kean – Old Vic; The Wild Duck – Phoenix	**Show Boat – London Palladium**; The Fantasticks – Regent's Park Open Air; The Rocky Horror Show – Piccadilly
Best Comedy	Best Entertainment
**Out of Order by Ray Cooney – Shaftesbury**; Gasping by Ben Elton – Theatre Royal Haymarket	**Five Guys Named Moe – Lyric**; An Evening with Peter Ustinov – Theatre Royal Haymarket; Victoria Wood up West – Strand
Actor of the Year	Actress of the Year
**Ian McKellen as Richard in Richard III – National Theatre Lyttelton**; Richard Harris as Henry IV, Holy Roman Emperor in Henry IV – Wyndham's; John Malkovich as Pale in Burn This – Lyric; Warren Mitchell as Max in The Homecoming – Comedy	**Kathryn Hunter as Claire Zachanassian in The Visit – National Theatre Lyttelton**; Penny Downie as Marianne in Scenes from a Marriage – Wyndham's; Barbara Jefford as Volumnia in Coriolanus – RSC at the Barbican; Josette Simon as Maggie in After the Fall – National Theatre Lyttelton
Outstanding Performance of the Year by an Actor in a Musical	Outstanding Performance of the Year by an Actress in a Musical
**Philip Quast as Georges Seurat and George in Sunday in the Park with George – National Theatre Lyttelton**; Ian Bartholomew as The Baker in Into the Woods – Phoenix; Bruce Hubbard as Joe in Show Boat – London Palladium; Paul J Medford as Little Moe in Five Guys Named Moe – Lyric	**Imelda Staunton as The Baker's Wife in Into the Woods – Phoenix**; Sally Burgess as Julie Dozier/Julie La Verne in Show Boat – London Palladium; Maria Friedman as Dot and Marie in Sunday in the Park with George – National Theatre Lyttelton; Julia McKenzie as The Witch in Into the Woods – Phoenix
Comedy Performance of the Year
**Alan Cumming as The Madman in Accidental Death of an Anarchist – National Theatre Cottesloe**; Richard Briers as Rat in The Wind in the Willows – National Theatre Olivier; Griff Rhys Jones as Mr. Toad in The Wind in the Willows – National Theatre Olivier; Joseph Maher as Dr. Rance in What the Butler Saw – Wyndham's
Performance of the Year by an Actor in a Supporting Role	Performance of the Year by an Actress in a Supporting Role
**David Bradley as The Fool in King Lear – National Theatre Lyttelton**; Ben Daniels as Richard Loeb in Never the Sinner – Playhouse; Mick Ford as Stefan in Singer – RSC at the Barbican; Jonathan Kent as Hero in The Rehearsal – Garrick	**Sara Crowe as Sybil in Private Lives – National Theatre Lyttelton**; Maria Miles as Hedvig Ekdal in The Wild Duck – Phoenix; Anita Reeves as Maggie in Dancing at Lughnasa – National Theatre Lyttelton; Zoë Wanamaker as Elizabeth Proctor in The Crucible – National Theatre Olivier
Best Supporting Performance in a Musical
**Karla Burns as Queenie in Show Boat – London Palladium**; Sandra Browne as Lady Thiang in The King and I – Sadler's Wells; Clive Carter as Cinderella's Prince and the Wolf in Into the Woods – Phoenix
Best Director of a Play	Best Director of a Musical
**David Thacker for Pericles – RSC at the Barbican Pit**; Richard Eyre for Richard III – National Theatre Lyttelton and White Chameleon – National Theatre Cottesloe; Nicholas Hytner for The Wind in the Willows – National Theatre Olivier; Patrick Mason for Dancing at Lughnasa – National Theatre Lyttelton	**Richard Jones for Into the Woods – Phoenix**; Charles Augins for Five Guys Named Moe – Lyric; Ian Judge for Show Boat – London Palladium; Steven Pimlott for Sunday in the Park with George – National Theatre Lyttelton
Best Theatre Choreographer
**Charles Augins for Five Guys Named Moe – Lyric**; Terry John Bates for Dancing at Lughnasa – National Theatre Lyttelton; Lawrence Evans for The Trackers of Oxyrhynchus – National Theatre Olivier
Best Set Designer	Best Costume Designer
**Mark Thompson for The Wind in the Willows – National Theatre Olivier**; Tom Cairns for Sunday in the Park with George – National Theatre Lyttelton; William Dudley for Marya – Old Vic; Nigel Lowery for The Illusion – Old Vic	**Jasper Conran for The Rehearsal – Garrick**; Sue Blane for Into the Woods – Phoenix; Tom Cairns for Sunday in the Park with George – National Theatre Lyttelton; Mark Thompson for The Wind in the Willows – National Theatre Olivier
Best Lighting Designer
**Jean Kalman for Richard III – National Theatre Lyttelton and White Chameleon – National Theatre Cottesloe**; Alan Burrett for Three Sisters – Royal Court; Pat Collins for The Illusion – Old Vic; Paul Pyant for The Wind in the Willows – National Theatre Olivier
Outstanding Achievement in Dance	Outstanding Achievement in Opera
**Twyla Tharp for choreographing and Jennifer Tipton for lighting In the Upper Room, American Ballet Theatre – London Coliseum**; Darcey Bussell in Stravinsky Violin Concerto and Winter Dreams, The Royal Ballet – Royal Opera House; Kenneth MacMillan for choreographing Winter Dreams, The Royal Ballet – Royal Opera House; Mark Morris for choreographing Drink to Me Only with Thine Eyes, American Ballet Theatre – London Coliseum; Phoenix Dance Company for its season – Sadler's Wells; The ensemble for their season, Siobhan Davies Dance Company – Sadler's Wells	**Mark Elder for conducting Duke Bluebeard's Castle, Macbeth, Pelléas and Mélisande and Wozzeck, English National Opera – London Coliseum**; Tim Albery for directing The Trojans, Scottish Opera – Royal Opera House; Duke Bluebeard's Castle by English National Opera – London Coliseum; Greek by English National Opera – London Coliseum; Éva Marton in Elektra, The Royal Opera – Royal Opera House; The Cunning Little Vixen by The Royal Opera – Royal Opera House
Award for Outstanding Achievement
**Cameron Mackintosh for creative contributions to West End theatre, generous donations to the University of Oxford (for a visiting drama professorship), the Royal National Theatre (for the presentation of great musicals) and the Tricycle Theatre**; Betrayal, The Rehearsal and Volpone – Almeida; Field Day Theatre Company for 10 years' achievement in presenting Irish drama across all borders; Robert Lepage for writing Tectonic Plates, Théâtre Repère – National Theatre Cottesloe
Society Special Award
**Peggy Ashcroft**

== Productions with multiple nominations and awards ==
The following 17 productions, including one ballet and one opera, received multiple nominations:

- 7: Into the Woods
- 6: Sunday in the Park with George and The Wind in the Willows
- 5: Show Boat
- 4: Dancing at Lughnasa and Five Guys Named Moe
- 3: Richard III, The Rehearsal and White Chameleon
- 2: Accidental Death of an Anarchist, Duke Bluebeard's Castle, Pericles, Singer, The Illusion, The Trackers of Oxyrhynchus, The Wild Duck and Winter Dreams

The following six productions received multiple awards:

- 2: Five Guys Named Moe, Into the Woods, Pericles, Richard III, Show Boat and Sunday in the Park with George

== See also ==
- 45th Tony Awards
