= Laurence Olivier Award for Best Director of a Play =

Retired award for London theatre

- Awarded for: Best Director of a Play
- Location: England
- Presented by: Society of London Theatre
- First award: 1991
- Final award: 1995
- Website: officiallondontheatre.com/olivier-awards/

The Laurence Olivier Award for Best Director of a Play was an annual award presented by the Society of London Theatre in recognition of the "world-class status of London theatre." The awards were established as the Society of West End Theatre Awards in 1976, and renamed in 1984 in honour of English actor and director Laurence Olivier.

This award was introduced in 1991, along with Best Director of a Musical, when the original (and singular) Best Director award was divided. The new pair of awards were last presented in 1995, after which the original Best Director award returned to the roster of Olivier Awards.

== Winners and nominees ==
=== 1990s ===
Year	Director	Production
1991
1991	David Thacker	Pericles, Prince of Tyre
1991	Richard Eyre	Richard III and White Chameleon
1991	Nicholas Hytner	The Wind in the Willows
1991	Patrick Mason	Dancing at Lughnasa
1992
1992	Deborah Warner	Hedda Gabler
1992	Declan Donnellan	Angels in America
1992	Ian Judge	The Comedy of Errors
1992	Sean Mathias	Uncle Vanya
1993
1993	Stephen Daldry	An Inspector Calls
1993	Simon McBurney	The Street of Crocodiles
1993	Sam Mendes	The Rise and Fall of Little Voice
1993	Adrian Noble	Henry IV
1994
1994	Stephen Daldry	Machinal
1994	Phyllida Lloyd	Hysteria
1994	Adrian Noble	The Winter's Tale
1994	Trevor Nunn	Arcadia
1995
1995	Declan Donnellan	As You Like It
1995	Sean Mathias	Les Parents terribles
1995	Simon McBurney	The Three Lives of Lucie Cabrol
1995	Katie Mitchell	Ghosts

== See also ==
- Drama Desk Award for Outstanding Director of a Play
- Tony Award for Best Direction of a Play
