= Laurence Olivier Award for Best Performance in a Supporting Role in a Musical =

Retired award for London theatre

- Awarded for: Best Performance in a Supporting Role in a Musical
- Location: England
- Presented by: Society of London Theatre
- First award: 1991
- Final award: 2014
- Website: officiallondontheatre.com/olivier-awards/

The Laurence Olivier Award for Best Performance in a Supporting Role in a Musical was an annual award presented by the Society of London Theatre in recognition of the "world-class status of London theatre." The awards were established as the Society of West End Theatre Awards in 1976, and renamed in 1984 in honour of English actor and director Laurence Olivier.

This commingled actor/actress award was introduced in 1991, presented through to 2014, then in 2015 was replaced by newly created awards for Best Actor in a Supporting Role in a Musical and Best Actress in a Supporting Role in a Musical.

On the 24 occasions that this commingled actor/actress award was given, it was presented 13 times to an actress, 10 times to an actor, and once to "The Chorus".

== Winners and nominees ==
=== 1990s ===
Year	Performer	Musical	Character
1991
1991	Karla Burns	Show Boat	Queenie
1991	Sandra Browne	The King and I	Lady Thiang
1991	Clive Carter	Into the Woods	Cinderella's Prince / Wolf
1992
1992	Jenny Galloway	The Boys from Syracuse	Luce
1992	Gregg Baker	Carmen Jones	Frankie
1992	Karen Parks	Carmen Jones	Myrt
1992	Martin Smith	A Swell Party	Soloist
1993
1993	Janie Dee	Carousel	Carrie Pipperidge
1993	Ian Bartholomew	Radio Times	Wilf
1993	Clive Rowe	Carousel	Enoch Snow
1993	Chris Langham	Crazy for You	Bella Zangler
1994
1994	Sara Kestelman	Cabaret	Frau Schneider
1994	Henry Goodman	City of Angels	Buddy Fidler
1994	Barry James	Sweeney Todd: The Demon Barber of Fleet Street	Beadle Bamford
1994	Adrian Lester	Sweeney Todd: The Demon Barber of Fleet Street	Anthony Hope
1995
1995	Tracie Bennett	She Loves Me	Ilona
1995	Sharon D. Clarke	Once on This Island	Asaka
1995	Tara Hugo	The Threepenny Opera	Jenny
1995	Berry Jones	She Loves Me	Stephen Kodaly
1996
1996	Sheila Gish	Company	Joanne
1996	John Bennet	Jolson	Epstein
1996	Siân Phillips	A Little Night Music	Madame Armfeldt
1996	Sophie Thompson	Company	Amy
1997
1997	Clive Rowe	Guys and Dolls	Nicely Nicely Johnson
1997	James Gillan	Tommy	Uncle Ernie
1997	Hugh Ross	Passion	Doctor Tambourri
1997	Tony Selby	Paint Your Wagon	Ben Rumson
1998
1998	James Dreyfus	Lady in the Dark	Russell Paxton
1998	Nicky Henson	Enter the Guardsman	Playwright / Narrator
1998	April Nixon	Damn Yankees	Lola
1998	Issy Van Randwyck	Kiss Me, Kate	Bianca / Lois Lane
1999
1999	Shuler Hensley	Oklahoma!	Jud Fry
1999	Wilson Jermaine Heredia	Rent	Angel Dumott Schunard
1999	Jimmy Johnston	Oklahoma!	Will Parker
1999	Andrew Kennedy	Annie	Rooster Hannigan

=== 2000s ===
Year	Performer	Musical	Character
2000
2000	Jenny Galloway	Mamma Mia!	Rosie Mulligan
2000	Joseph Alessi	Animal Crackers	Emanuel Ravelli
2000	Steven Houghton	Spend Spend Spend	Keith Nicholson
2000	Louise Plowright	Mamma Mia!	Tanya Chesham-Leigh
2000	Denis Quilley	Candide	Baron Von Thunder/Martin
2001
2001	Miles Western	Pageant	Miss West Coast
2001	Rosemary Ashe	The Witches of Eastwick	Felicia Gabriel
2001	Rebecca Thornhill	Singin' in the Rain	Lina Lamont
2001	Taewon Yi Kim	The King and I	Lady Thiang
2002
2002	Martyn Jacques	Shockheaded Peter	Performer
2002	Nancy Anderson	Kiss Me, Kate	Bianca / Lois Lane
2002	Michael Berresse	Kiss Me, Kate	Bill Calhoun
2002	Nicholas Le Prevost	My Fair Lady	Colonel Hugh Pickering
2003
2003	Paul Baker	Taboo	Philip Sallon
2003	Sharon D. Clarke	We Will Rock You	Killer Queen
2003	Jenny Galloway	My One and Only	Mickey
2003	Nichola McAuliffe	Chitty Chitty Bang Bang	Baroness Bomburst
2003	Craig Urbani	Contact	Performer
2004
2004	The Chorus	Jerry Springer	The Studio Audience
2004	Tracie Bennett	High Society	Liz
2004	Richard Henders	Pacific Overtures	Manjiro
2004	Jérôme Pradon	Pacific Overtures	Shogun's Mother / French Admiral
2004	Matthew White	Ragtime	Younger Brother
2005
2005	Conleth Hill	The Producers	Roger de Bris
2005	Michael Crawford	The Woman in White	Count Fosco
2005	David Haig	Mary Poppins	George Banks
2006
2006	Celia Imrie	Acorn Antiques	Miss Babs
2006	Tameka Empson	The Big Life	Mrs. Aphrodite
2006	Tim Healy	Billy Elliot	Dad
2006	Scarlett Strallen	H.M.S. Pinafore	Josephine
2007
2007	Sheila Hancock	Cabaret	Fraulein Schneider
2007	Anna Francolini	Caroline, or Change	Rose
2007	Tom Goodman-Hill	Spamalot	Sir Lancelot
2007	Summer Strallen	The Boy Friend	Maisie
2008
2008	Tracie Bennett	Hairspray	Velma Von Tussle
2008	Elinor Collett	Hairspray	Penny Pingleton
2008	Shaun Escoffery	Parade	Jim Conley
2008	Alistair McGowan	Little Shop of Horrors	Orin Scrivello
2009
2009	Lesli Margherita	Zorro	Inez
2009	Alexander Hanson	Marguerite	Otto
2009	Katherine Kingsley	Piaf	Marlene Dietrich
2009	Jason Pennycooke	La Cage aux Folles	Jacob
2009	Dave Willetts	Sunset Boulevard	Max

=== 2010s ===
Year	Performer	Musical	Character
2010
2010	Iwan Rheon	Spring Awakening	Moritz
2010	Sheila Hancock	Sister Act	Mother Superior
2010	Maureen Lipman	A Little Night Music	Madame Armfeldt
2010	Kelly Price	A Little Night Music	Anne Egerman
2011
2011	Jill Halfpenny	Legally Blonde	Paulette Bonafonté
2011	Josefina Gabrielle	Sweet Charity	Nickie
2011	Summer Strallen	Love Never Dies	Meg Giry
2011	Michael Xavier	Into the Woods	Cinderella's Prince / Wolf
2012
2012	Nigel Harman	Shrek	Lord Farquaad
2012	Sharon D. Clarke	Ghost	Oda Mae Brown
2012	Sophie-Louise Dann	Lend Me a Tenor	Diana Divane
2012	Paul Kaye	Matilda	Mr. Wormwood
2012	Katherine Kingsley	Singin' in the Rain	Lina Lamont
2013
2013	Leigh Zimmerman	A Chorus Line	Sheila
2013	Adam Garcia	Kiss Me, Kate	Bill Calhoun
2013	Debbie Kurup	The Bodyguard	Nicki Marron
2013	Siân Phillips	Cabaret	Fraulein Schneider
2014
2014	Stephen Ashfield	The Book of Mormon	Elder McKinley
2014	Colman Domingo	The Scottsboro Boys	Mr. Bones
2014	Josefina Gabrielle	Merrily We Roll Along	Gussie
2014	Nigel Planer	Charlie and the Chocolate Factory	Grandpa Joe

== Multiple awards and nominations for Best Performance in a Supporting Role ==
=== Awards ===
Two awards

- Tracie Bennett
- Jenny Galloway

=== Nominations ===
Three nominations

- Tracie Bennett
- Sharon D. Clarke
- Jenny Galloway

Two nominations

- Josefina Gabrielle
- Sheila Hancock
- Katherine Kingsley
- Siân Phillips
- Clive Rowe
- Summer Strallen

== See also ==
- Drama Desk Award for Outstanding Featured Actor in a Musical
- Drama Desk Award for Outstanding Featured Actress in a Musical
- Lists of acting awards
- List of awards for supporting actor
- Tony Award for Best Featured Actor in a Musical
- Tony Award for Best Featured Actress in a Musical
