= Sandra Browne =

Trinidadian operatic mezzo-soprano (born 1947)

Sandra Browne (born July 27, 1947) is a Trinidadian operatic mezzo-soprano.

== Biography ==
Born on July 27, 1947, in Point Fortin, Browne was the only survivor of six children. A scholarship student at Vassar College, upon her 1968 graduation she initially intended on a career in the diplomatic corps before being persuaded to develop her musical abilities. In 1971, she won the Kathleen Ferrier Memorial Competition, and the following year made her British operatic debut singing Ismene in Nabucco at Welsh National Opera. In 1973, she appeared at the Camden Festival as Man Friday in Robinson Crusoé of Jacques Offenbach, and in 1974 she sang Poppea in L'incoronazione di Poppea with Kent Opera. She sang at the English National Opera in such roles as Rosina, Octavian, and Carmen, and in 1975 she sang Dorabella for the Welsh National Opera. In 1991, she received a nomination for the Laurence Olivier Award for Best Performance in a Supporting Role in a Musical for her performances as Lady Thiang in The King and I.
