= Laurence Olivier Award for Best Musical Revival =

Annual award for London theatre

- Awarded for: Best Musical Revival
- Location: England
- Presented by: Society of London Theatre
- First award: 1991
- Currently held by: Into the Woods (2026)
- Website: officiallondontheatre.com/olivier-awards/

The Laurence Olivier Award for Best Musical Revival is an annual award presented by the Society of London Theatre in recognition of the "world-class status of London theatre." The awards were established as the Society of West End Theatre Awards in 1976, and renamed in 1984 in honour of English actor and director Laurence Olivier.

This award was introduced in 1991. From 1997 to 2007, the award was presented as Outstanding Musical Production.

== Winners and nominees ==
=== 1990s ===
Year	Musical	Book	Music	Lyrics
1991
1991	Show Boat	Oscar Hammerstein II	Jerome Kern	Oscar Hammerstein II
1991	The Fantasticks	Tom Jones	Harvey Schmidt	Tom Jones
1991	The Rocky Horror Show	Richard O'Brien		
1992
1992	The Boys from Syracuse	George Abbott	Richard Rodgers	Lorenz Hart
1992	Joseph and the Amazing Technicolor Dreamcoat	Frank Dunlop	Andrew Lloyd Webber	Tim Rice
1993
1993	Carousel	Oscar Hammerstein II	Richard Rodgers	Oscar Hammerstein II
1993	Annie Get Your Gun	Herbert and Dorothy Fields	Irving Berlin	
1993	Lady, Be Good	Guy Bolton and Fred Thompson	George and Ira Gershwin	
1994
1994	Sweeney Todd	Hugh Wheeler	Stephen Sondheim	
1994	Cabaret	Joe Masteroff	John Kander	Fred Ebb
1994	Grease	Jim Jacobs and Warren Casey		
1994	The Beggar's Opera	John Gay		
1995
1995	She Loves Me	Joe Masteroff	Jerry Bock	Sheldon Harnick
1995	The Card	Keith Waterhouse and Willis Hall	Tony Hatch	Anthony Drewe
1995	Oliver!	Lionel Bart		
1995	The Threepenny Opera	Bertolt Brecht	Kurt Weill	Bertolt Brecht
1997
1997	The Who's Tommy	Pete Townshend and Des McAnuff	Pete Townshend	
1997	By Jeeves	Alan Ayckbourn	Andrew Lloyd Webber	Alan Ayckbourn
1997	Jesus Christ Superstar	Tom O'Horgan	Andrew Lloyd Webber	Tim Rice
1997	Smokey Joe's Cafe	Jerry Zaks	Jerry Leiber and Mike Stoller	
1998
1998	Chicago	Fred Ebb and Bob Fosse	John Kander	Fred Ebb
1998	Damn Yankees	George Abbott and Douglass Wallop	Richard Adler	Jerry Ross
1998	Kiss Me, Kate	Samuel and Bella Spewack	Cole Porter	
1999
1999	Oklahoma!	Oscar Hammerstein II	Richard Rodgers	Oscar Hammerstein II
1999	Annie	Thomas Meehan	Charles Strouse	Martin Charnin
1999	Into the Woods	James Lapine	Stephen Sondheim	
1999	Show Boat	Oscar Hammerstein II	Jerome Kern	Oscar Hammerstein II

=== 2000s ===
Year	Musical	Book	Music	Lyrics
2000
2000	Candide	Hugh Wheeler	Leonard Bernstein	Richard Wilbur
2000	A Funny Thing Happened on the Way to the Forum	Burt Shevelove and Larry Gelbart	Stephen Sondheim	
2000	Dick Whittington	Gillian Lynne, Stephen Clarke and Chris Walker		
2000	The Pajama Game	George Abbott and Richard Bissell	Richard Adler and Jerry Ross	
2001
2001	Singin' in the Rain	Betty Comden and Adolph Green	Nacio Herb Brown	Arthur Freed
2001	H.M.S. Pinafore	W. S. Gilbert	Arthur Sullivan	W. S. Gilbert
2001	The King and I	Oscar Hammerstein II	Richard Rodgers	Oscar Hammerstein II
2001	The Mikado	W. S. Gilbert	Arthur Sullivan	W. S. Gilbert
2001	The Pirates of Penzance	W. S. Gilbert	Arthur Sullivan	W. S. Gilbert
2002
2002	My Fair Lady	Alan Jay Lerner	Frederick Loewe	Alan Jay Lerner
2002	Kiss Me, Kate	Samuel and Bella Spewack	Cole Porter	
2002	South Pacific	Oscar Hammerstein II and Joshua Logan	Richard Rodgers	Oscar Hammerstein II
2003
2003	Anything Goes	Timothy Crouse and John Weidman	Cole Porter	
2003	Oh, What a Lovely War!	Joan Littlewood and Theatre Workshop	Various Artists	
2004
2004	Pacific Overtures	John Weidman and Hugh Wheeler	Stephen Sondheim	
2004	High Society	Arthur Kopit	Cole Porter	Cole Porter and Susan Birkenhead
2004	Joseph and the Amazing Technicolor Dreamcoat	Frank Dunlop	Andrew Lloyd Webber	Tim Rice
2004	Tell Me on a Sunday	Don Black	Andrew Lloyd Webber	Don Black
2005
2005	Grand Hotel	Luther Davis	Robert Wright and George Forrest	
2005	A Funny Thing Happened on the Way to the Forum	Burt Shevelove and Larry Gelbart	Stephen Sondheim	
2005	Simply Heavenly	Langston Hughes	David Martin	Langston Hughes
2005	Sweeney Todd	Hugh Wheeler	Stephen Sondheim	
2006
2006	Guys and Dolls	Jo Swerling and Abe Burrows	Frank Loesser	
2006	H.M.S. Pinafore	W. S. Gilbert	Arthur Sullivan	W. S. Gilbert
2007
2007	Sunday in the Park with George	James Lapine	Stephen Sondheim	
2007	Cabaret	Joe Masteroff	John Kander	Fred Ebb
2007	Evita	Tim Rice	Andrew Lloyd Webber	Tim Rice
2007	The Sound of Music	Howard Lindsay and Russel Crouse	Richard Rodgers	Oscar Hammerstein II
2008
2008	The Magic Flute	Wolfgang Amadeus Mozart and Mark Dornford-May	Various Artists	
2008	Fiddler on the Roof	Joseph Stein	Jerry Bock	Sheldon Harnick
2008	Little Shop of Horrors	Howard Ashman	Alan Menken	Howard Ashman
2009
2009	La Cage aux Folles	Harvey Fierstein	Jerry Herman	
2009	Piaf	Pam Gems	Various Artists	
2009	Sunset Boulevard	Don Black and Christopher Hampton	Andrew Lloyd Webber	Don Black and Christopher Hampton
2009	West Side Story	Arthur Laurents	Leonard Bernstein	Stephen Sondheim

=== 2010s ===
Year	Musical	Book	Music	Lyrics
2010
2010	Hello, Dolly!	Michael Stewart	Jerry Herman	
2010	Annie Get Your Gun	Herbert and Dorothy Fields	Irving Berlin	
2010	A Little Night Music	Hugh Wheeler	Stephen Sondheim	
2010	Oliver!	Lionel Bart		
2011
2011	Into the Woods	James Lapine	Stephen Sondheim	
2011	Passion	James Lapine	Stephen Sondheim	
2011	Sweet Charity	Neil Simon	Cy Coleman	Dorothy Fields
2012
2012	Crazy for You	Ken Ludwig	George Gershwin	Ira Gershwin
2012	Singin' in the Rain	Betty Comden and Adolph Green	Nacio Herb Brown	Arthur Freed
2012	South Pacific	Oscar Hammerstein II and Joshua Logan	Richard Rodgers	Oscar Hammerstein II
2012	The Wizard of Oz	Andrew Lloyd Webber and Jeremy Sams	Andrew Lloyd Webber and Harold Arlen	Tim Rice and E. Y. Harburg
2013
2013	Sweeney Todd	Hugh Wheeler	Stephen Sondheim	
2013	A Chorus Line	James Kirkwood, Jr. and Nicholas Dante	Marvin Hamlisch	Edward Kleban
2013	Cabaret	Joe Masteroff	John Kander	Fred Ebb
2013	Kiss Me, Kate	Samuel and Bella Spewack	Cole Porter	
2014
2014	Merrily We Roll Along	George Furth	Stephen Sondheim	
2014	The Sound of Music	Howard Lindsay and Russel Crouse	Richard Rodgers	Oscar Hammerstein II
2014	Tell Me on a Sunday	Don Black	Andrew Lloyd Webber	Don Black
2015
2015	City of Angels	Larry Gelbart	Cy Coleman	David Zippel
2015	Cats	T. S. Eliot	Andrew Lloyd Webber	T. S. Eliot, additional by Trevor Nunn and Richard Stilgoe
2015	Miss Saigon	Alain Boublil and Claude-Michel Schönberg	Claude-Michel Schönberg	Alain Boublil and Richard Maltby, Jr.
2015	Porgy and Bess	Dorothy Heyward, DuBose Heyward and Suzan-Lori Parks	George Gershwin and Diedre Murray	Dorothy Heyward, DuBose Heyward and Ira Gershwin
2016
2016	Gypsy	Arthur Laurents	Jule Styne	Stephen Sondheim
2016	Bugsy Malone	Alan Parker	Paul Williams	
2016	Guys and Dolls	Jo Swerling and Abe Burrows	Frank Loesser	
2016	Seven Brides for Seven Brothers	Lawrence Kasha and David Landay	Gene de Paul, Al Kasha and Joel Hirschhorn	Johnny Mercer, Al Kasha and Joel Hirschhorn
2017
2017	Jesus Christ Superstar	Tim Rice	Andrew Lloyd Webber	Tim Rice
2017	Funny Girl	Isobel Lennart	Jule Styne	Bob Merrill
2017	Show Boat	Oscar Hammerstein II	Jerome Kern	Oscar Hammerstein II and P. G. Wodehouse
2017	Sunset Boulevard	Don Black and Christopher Hampton	Andrew Lloyd Webber	Don Black and Christopher Hampton
2018
2018	Follies	James Goldman	Stephen Sondheim	
2018	42nd Street	Michael Stewart and Mark Bramble	Harry Warren	Al Dubin and Johnny Mercer
2018	On the Town	Betty Comden and Adolph Green	Leonard Bernstein	Betty Comden and Adolph Green
2019
2019	Company	George Furth	Stephen Sondheim	
2019	Caroline, or Change	Tony Kushner	Jeanine Tesori	Tony Kushner
2019	The King and I	Oscar Hammerstein II	Richard Rodgers	Oscar Hammerstein II

=== 2020s ===
Year	Musical	Book	Music	Lyrics
2020
2020	Fiddler on the Roof	Joseph Stein	Jerry Bock	Sheldon Harnick
2020	Evita	Tim Rice	Andrew Lloyd Webber	Tim Rice
2020	Joseph and the Amazing Technicolor Dreamcoat	Tim Rice	Andrew Lloyd Webber	Tim Rice
2020	Mary Poppins	Julian Fellowes	Richard M. Sherman, Robert B. Sherman, and George Stiles	Richard M. Sherman, Robert B. Sherman, and Anthony Drewe
2021	Not presented due to extended closing of theatre productions during COVID-19 pandemic (Note: Due to late March 2020 to late July 2021 closing of London theatre productions during the COVID-19 pandemic in England, the 2022 awards recognise productions that launched anytime from February 2020 to February 2022)			
2022	Cabaret	Joe Masteroff	John Kander	Fred Ebb
2022	Anything Goes	Guy Bolton, Russel Crouse, Timothy Crouse, Howard Lindsay, John Weidman and P.G. Wodehouse	Cole Porter	
2022	Spring Awakening	Steven Sater	Duncan Sheik	Steven Sater
2023
2023	Oklahoma!	Oscar Hammerstein II	Richard Rodgers	Oscar Hammerstein II
2023	My Fair Lady	Alan Jay Lerner	Frederick Loewe	Alan Jay Lerner
2023	Sister Act	Cheri Steinkellner and Bill Steinkellner	Alan Menken	Glenn Slater
2023	South Pacific	Oscar Hammerstein II and Joshua Logan	Richard Rodgers	Oscar Hammerstein II
2024
2024	Sunset Boulevard	Don Black and Christopher Hampton	Andrew Lloyd Webber	Don Black and Christopher Hampton
2024	Groundhog Day	Danny Rubin	Tim Minchin	
2024	Guys and Dolls	Jo Swerling and Abe Burrows	Frank Loesser	
2024	Hadestown	Anais Mitchell		
2025
2025	Fiddler on the Roof	Joseph Stein	Jerry Bock	Sheldon Harnick
2025	Hello, Dolly!	Michael Stewart	Jerry Herman	
2025	Oliver!	Lionel Bart		
2025	Starlight Express	Andrew Lloyd Webber and Richard Stilgoe		
2026
2026	Into The Woods	James Lapine	Stephen Sondheim	
2026	American Psycho	Roberto Aguirre-Sacasa	Duncan Sheik	
2026	Evita	Tim Rice	Andrew Lloyd Webber	
2026	The Producers	Mel Brooks and Thomas Meehan	Mel Brooks	

== Multiple awards and nominations ==
=== Awards ===
Two awards

- Fiddler on the Roof
- Into the Woods
- Oklahoma!
- Sweeney Todd

=== Nominations ===
Four nominations

- Cabaret

Three nominations

- Evita
- Fiddler on the Roof
- Guys and Dolls
- Into the Woods
- Joseph and the Amazing Technicolor Dreamcoat
- Kiss Me Kate
- Oliver!
- Show Boat
- South Pacific
- Sunset Boulevard
- Sweeney Todd

Two nominations

- Annie Get Your Gun
- Anything Goes
- A Funny Thing Happened on the Way to the Forum
- Hello, Dolly!
- H.M.S. Pinafore
- Jesus Christ Superstar
- The King and I
- My Fair Lady
- Oklahoma!
- Singin' in the Rain
- The Sound of Music
- Tell Me on a Sunday

== See also ==
- Critics' Circle Award for Best Musical
- Evening Standard Theatre Award for Best Musical
- Tony Award for Best Revival of a Musical
