= Welcome to the Club (1971 film) =

1971 film by Walter Shenson

- Theatrical release poster
- Directed by: Walter Shenson
- Screenplay by: Clement Biddle Wood
- Based on: Welcome to the Club by Clement Biddle Wood
- Produced by: Leon Becker; Walter Shenson
- Starring: Brian Foley; Jack Warden; Andy Jarrell; Kevin O'Connor; Francesca Tu; David Toguri
- Cinematography: Mikael Salomon
- Edited by: Jim Connock
- Music by: Ken Thorne
- Production companies: Columbia Pictures; Welcome Productions
- Distributed by: Columbia Pictures
- Release date: September 1971
- Running time: 88 minutes
- Country: United States
- Language: English

Welcome to the Club is a 1971 American comedy film directed by Walter Shenson and starring Brian Foley, Jack Warden, Andy Jarrell, Kevin O'Connor, Francesca Tu, and David Toguri. It is based on the 1966 novel of the same name by Clement Biddle Wood. The film was released by Columbia Pictures in September 1971.

== Cast ==
- Brian Foley as Lt. Andrew Oxblood
- Jack Warden as Gen. Strapp
- Andy Jarrell as Robert E. Lee Fairfax
- Kevin O'Connor as Harrison W. Morve
- Francesca Tu as Hogan
- David Toguri as Hideki Ikada
- Al Mancini as Pvt. Marcantonio
- Art Wallace as Col. Buonocuore
- Marsha A. Hunt as Leah Wheat
- Joyce Wilford as Shawna O'Shay
- Lon Satton as Marshall Bowles
- Christopher Malcolm as Pvt. Henry Hoe
- John Dunn-Hill as Pvt. O'Malley
- Lee Meredith as Betsy Wholecloth
- Louis Quinn as Capt. Sigmus
- Lionel Murton as Col. Ames
- Jeanne Darville as Mrs. Oxblood
- Anisha as Chita
- Claus Ersbak as Schultz
- Norman Oliver as Tom
- Mary Petryshyn as Ann (as Eva Marie Petryshen)
