= Adèle Charvet =

French mezzo-soprano (born 1993)

Adèle Charvet (French: [adɛl ʃaʁvɛ]; born 1993) is a French mezzo-soprano.

== Life ==
Born in Montpellier, Charvet lived in New-York for up to five years. She began studying music at the age of six and sang in the choir of Claire Marchand then at the Maîtrise de Radio France where she took part at the age of 9, in the choirs, in her very first opera, the musical tale of Julien Joubert, La Reine des glaces, in March 2003 in the amphitheatre of the opéra Bastille In 2008, she joined the conservatoire à rayonnement régional de Paris} where she obtained her diplôme d'études musicales with the congratulations of the jury in 2013, before joining the singing classes of Yves Sotin and Élène Golgevit at the Conservatoire de Paris. There, with the soprano Mariamielle Lamagat, the tenor Mathys Lagier and the baritone Edwin Fardini, she founded the vocal quartet "L'Archipel", which is invited in residence at the foundation Singer-Polignac

She recorded for Alpha Classics in February 2019, with Susan Manoff at the piano, a disc entitled Long time ago, which mixes songs by American and British composers.

On 1 October 2019, while attending a concert given by La Chapelle Harmonique under the direction of her friend Valentin Tournet at the auditorium de Radio France, she is called at intermission to replace at the last minute the countertenor David DQ Lee, suffering, in Handel's Messiah The intermission is lengthened by twenty minutes to allow her to decipher the score and she received a standing ovation at the end of the concert.

She was nominated in 2020 at the Victoires de la musique classique in the "Revelation, lyric artist" category.

She composed a noted Mélisande for her role in the Rouen Opera House production broadcast on 26 January 2021 on the Norman TV Channel.

== Family ==
Charvet is the daughter of the composer Pierre Charvet and the sportswoman Nadine Éwanjé-Épée. She considers the poet Frédéric Jacques Temple as her grandfather since the latter had a very long love and artistic relationship with Brigitte Portal, her paternal grandmother. Her maternal grandfather, Charles Éwanjé-Épée, is a musician and composer of Cameroonian origin.

== Prizes ==
- 2015 : Prix de mélodie du Centre international Nadia et Lili Boulanger with pianist Florian Caroubi.
- 2016 : Prix Eugène Pannebakker Lied Duo, Dioraphte Composition Award, Prix de la presse, Prix du jury junior et MAX Young Talent Award, at the International Vocal Competition 's-Hertogenbosch avec le pianiste Florian Caroubi
- 2017 : Prix d'honneur au Verbier Festival
- 2019 : Prix Jeune Soliste 2020 of the Les Médias francophones publics.
