= The Magic Flute (musical) =

- Cast album
- Music: Mandisi Dyantyis; Mbali Kgosidintsi; Pauline Malefane; Nolufefe Mtshabe
- Lyrics: Mandisi Dyantyis; Mbali Kgosidintsi; Pauline Malefane; Nolufefe Mtshabe
- Book: Wolfgang Amadeus Mozart, Emanuel Schikaneder; Mark Dornford-May
- Basis: The Magic Flute
- Productions: 2007 West End
- Awards: 2008 Laurence Olivier Award for Best Musical Revival

The Magic Flute (Impempe Yomlingo) is a musical theatre work adapted from the Wolfgang Amadeus Mozart opera of the same title by Mark Dornford-May, with words and music by Mandisi Dyantyis, Mbali Kgosidintsi, Pauline Malefane and Nolufefe Mtshabe. Mozart's score is transposed for an orchestra of marimbas, drums and township percussion. The musical, set in contemporary South Africa, re-interprets the story from a South African perspective, telling of Prince Tamino's quest to rescue Pamina (both of them are Xhosa-speaking teenagers), daughter of the Queen of the Night, from the Priest of the Sun.

The musical premiered in 2007 at the Baxter Theatre in Cape Town, South Africa, before beginning a tour to the United Kingdom. The production opened at the Young Vic Theatre in London over the festive season, 2007. The cast performed The Magic Flute and an adaptation of Charles Dickens' A Christmas Carol on alternate days for a nine-week run. The production won the Whatsonstage Theatregoers' Choice Award for Best Off-West End Production. Its success led to a transfer to the Duke of York's Theatre for a further run until 19 April, 2008. The musical won the Laurence Olivier Award for Best Musical Revival that year.

Following its West End theatre season, the production toured to the Dublin Theatre Festival, the Chichester Festival Theatre and the Canterbury Festival. In November 2008, it returned to South Africa for a season at the Market Theatre in Johannesburg. It then played in Tokyo and elsewhere, concluding its tour at the Singapore Arts Festival in June 2009.

The production, directed by Dornford-May and choreographed by Lungelo Ngamlana, starred Dornford-May's wife, Pauline Malefane in the role of the Queen of the Night. It featured performers from the township of Khayelitsha in the Western Cape of South Africa. The Irish Times said that the work "gets right to the heart of the opera's humanist message".
