= Stephen Clark (playwright) =

British playwright, librettist and lyricist

Stephen Clark (2 February 1961 – 15 October 2016) was a British playwright, librettist and lyricist, best known for the musicals Zorro and Love Story.

== Early life ==
Clark was born in Nottingham, the son of playwright and television writer Brian Clark.

== Career ==
Clark attended musical theatre masterclasses led by Stephen Sondheim at the University of Oxford in 1991.

He first received notice with the musical Eyam, with music by Andrew Peggie, concerning the village of the same name during the 17th century bubonic plague. Eyam was performed in Oxford and at the Bridewell Theatre in London.

Clark contributed lyrics to the revised version of Martin Guerre, which received the 1997 Olivier Award for Best New Musical.

For the English National Opera, his English libretto for La Traviata was produced in 2006.

Clark's music theatre adaptation of The Mahabharata, music by Nitin Sawhney, opened in 2007 at Sadler's Wells Theatre, London.

He wrote the lyrics and co-wrote the book for Zorro, produced on the West End in 2008 and nominated for Best New Musical at the 2009 Olivier Awards.

In 2010, the Chichester Festival Theare produced Love Story, with Clark writing book and co-writing lyrics with composer Howard Goodall. Love Story transferred to the West End and was nominated for Best New Musical at the Olivier Awards.

He contributed to three Singapore-produced musicals, Sing to the Dawn (1996), Forbidden City (2002) and The LKY Musical (2015).

His plays include Making Waves and Stripped.
