= Love Story (musical) =

- West End Artwork
- Music: Howard Goodall
- Lyrics: Stephen Clark/Howard Goodall
- Book: Stephen Clark
- Basis: 1970 film Love Story; 1970 novel by Erich Segal
- Productions: 2010 Chichester Festival Theatre; 2010 West End; 2013 Netherlands; 2013 Russia

Love Story is a musical written by Stephen Clark with music by Howard Goodall and lyrics by Stephen Clark and Goodall. It is inspired by Erich Segal's best-selling 1970 novel of the same name. Love Story transferred to the Duchess Theatre in the West End in December 2010 following a critically acclaimed sell-out season at the Chichester Festival Theatre.

== Plot ==
At Jenny's funeral, her family and friends flashback ("What can you say about a girl?") about her life.

Oliver is a rich young man who meets a spirited young woman, Jenny. She is poor and of Italian heritage, but has attended Radcliffe College and plays the piano. They fall in love and marry, against his family's wishes. Oliver, disinherited, attends law school, while Jenny works to support them. However, she contracts a fatal illness, leukemia, and dies.

== Productions ==
=== 2010 Chichester Festival Theatre ===
Love Story had its world premiere at the Chichester Festival Theatre, where it ran at the Minerva Theatre from 29 May 2010 until 26 June 2010. The cast featured Emma Williams as Jenny, Michael Xavier as Oliver Barrett IV and Peter Polycarpou as Phil.

=== 2010 West End ===
Love Story transferred to the Duchess Theatre in the West End, officially opening on 6 December 2010 following previews from 27 November. It played a limited 10-week engagement which ended 26 February 2011. Michael Ball makes his producing debut in a co-production alongside Adam Spiegel and Stephen Waley-Cohen. Directed by Rachel Kavanaugh, the set and costume designer is Peter McKintosh, lighting designer is Howard Harrison, and musical staging is by Lizzi Gee. The musical runs without intermission, and the music is played by an on-stage pianist and a septet of strings.

=== 2012 Philadelphia ===
The Walnut Street Theatre in Philadelphia presented the first American production of Love Story, as the first show in its 204th season, in September and October 2012 starring Alexandra Silber and Will Reynolds.

=== 2013 Edinburgh Fringe ===
The show had a limited run at the Edinburgh Fringe Festival at the Paradise in Augustine's Theatre in August 2013, starring Eloise Hare and Will Arundell.

=== 2013–2014 Netherlands Tour ===
A Dutch version, and first non-English production was announced in early 2013. Its opening night was on 29 November 2013, two weeks later than planned due to a back injury for its star Freek Bartels. This version is a touring musical, after it had originally been planned at the Beatrix Theater in Utrecht. Freek Bartels plays Oliver, Celinde Schoenmaker plays Jenny, and her parents are played by Dick Cohen and Marleen van der Loo. This production follows its original British version by having no intermission. The story was translated by Jan Rot.

=== 2013 Russian Tour ===
The first Russian tour, a non-replica production, toured Russia throughout 2014. Ekaterina Novosyolova and Valeriya Lanskaya played the role of Jenny, and Pavel Lyovkin and Stanislav Belyaev played Oliver. The Russian production took more inspiration from the original one act book.

=== 2014 Bolton Octagon ===
Bolton Octagon, Greater Manchester presented Love Story as their closing show for their 2013/2014 run, in June to July 2014. The production featured Daniel Boys in the role of Oliver, and Lauren Samuels in the role of Jenny. The show was met by rave reviews. For example, the Reviews Hub reviewer wrote: "Elizabeth Newman’s delicate production, keeps things simple, the strength here lies in not only Goodall’s soaring melodies, but in the performances from her lead actors. Daniel Boys’ portrayal of Oliver is nothing short of perfect...Equally impressive is Lauren Samuels, her edgy and confident portrayal of Jenny Cavilleri is a breath of fresh air ..."

=== 2016 Brazil ===
A Brazilian production opened in June 10th 2016, at Teatro Imperator in Rio de Janeiro. The production included Kacau Gomes as Jennifer Cavalleri and Fábio Ventura as Oliver Barrett. The production was significant for its entirely Black/African American cast. Directed by Tadeu Aguiar, the story was translated by Artur Xexéo.

=== 2017 Ann Arbor, Michigan USA ===
In 2017, Ann Arbor Musical Theater Works presented the musical with a direct license from Adam Spiegel Ltd in the UK when MTI stopped carrying licensing for the USA. This very successful production was directed by Ronald Baumanis and musical directed by Leah Fox. Colby Cesaro and Kevin Kaminski starred in the leading roles.

=== 2017 Hildesheim, Lower Saxony, Germany ===
In 2017, Theater für Niedersachsen presented the musical in Hildesheim, Germany. The premiere occurred on August 20th, 2017. Jörg Gade acted as the director, accompanied by musical director Andreas Unsicker. Choreography was created by Annika Dickel, and Elisabeth Köstner and Jürgen Brehm starred as Jenny and Oliver respectively. Supporting cast members included Alexander Prosek as Phil and Jens Krause as Oliver's father.

== Musical numbers ==
- "What Can You Say?" — Company
- "Jenny's Piano Song" — Jenny
- "Winter's Night" — Oliver, Jenny & Company
- "Jenny's Piano Song" (Reprise) — Jenny
- "The Recital" — Oliver & Company
- "What Happens Now?" — Oliver & Jenny
- "Nocturnes (Pre-Echo)" — Jenny
- "Phil's Piano Song" — Phil
- "Summer's Day" — Phil, Jenny, Oliver & Company
- "Pasta" — Jenny & Oliver
- "Everything We Know" — Oliver & Jenny
- "The Tide Has Turned" — Jenny, Oliver & Company
- "Nocturnes" — Jenny
- "Everything We Know" (Reprise) — Jenny & Oliver
- "What Can You Say" (Reprise) — Company
- "Clapping Symphony" — Orchestra

The Original London Cast Recording is available, released by Faber Music, on CD and in digital formats.

== Critical reception ==
The reviewer of the Chichester Festival Theatre production wrote in indielondon.co.uk: "Stephen Clark has adapted the story into a succession of short scenes which, under Rachel Kavanaugh’s adept direction, follow on cohesively and coherently resulting in a believable and very poignant evening. Howard Goodall’s songs are integral to the action and they are beautifully performed by the principals and [the] chorus. [T]he two principals, Oliver (Michael Xavier) and Jenny (Emma Williams)...give superb and utterly sincere performances."

In its review roundup of the musical at the Chichester Festival Theatre, theatremania.com noted the reviews "praising Goodall's score, Kavanaugh's staging and the central performances from Xavier and Williams."

Chichester Festival Theatre production review: "Howard Goodall and Stephen Clark have created a terrific new musical...The show finished to a chorus of heavy sniffles, superseded by hearty applause, which I take to mean a West End transfer should be given".

The reviewer of the West End production at the Duchess Theatre for Whatsonstage.com wrote: "Goodall’s music...is always interesting, often beautiful.... The framing epitaph is lovely writing, too.... Rachel Kavanaugh’s austere production on an all-white design by Peter McKintosh – whose three Corinthian pillars somehow conjure Pearl and Dean as readily as pearly gates – transfers well from the Minerva in Chichester.... This is a high-calibre chamber musical, all right, with a top skill factor in both writing and onstage musicianship (piano, guitar and string quintet); then just when it’s nearly enough, it plummets into bathos and easily resistible, tear-jerking manipulation."

The Dutch version was well received by Dutch critics after its opening night. Amsterdam daily Het Parool wrote: "A wonderful, subdued 'Love Story'. No superficial pathos, wonderful melodies by Howard Goodall... A little, surprisingly enchanting version of this well known story".

== Awards and nominations ==
=== Original London production ===
Year	Award Ceremony	Category	Nominee	Result	Ref
2011	Laurence Olivier Award	Best New Musical		Nominated	
2011	Laurence Olivier Award	Best Actor in a Musical	Michael Xavier	Nominated	
2011	Laurence Olivier Award	Best Actress in a Musical	Emma Williams	Nominated	
