= The Illusion (play) =

The Illusion is a play by Tony Kushner, adapted from Pierre Corneille's seventeenth-century comedy, L'Illusion Comique. It follows a contrite father, Pridamant, seeking news of his prodigal son from the sorcerer Alcandre. The magician conjures three episodes from the young man's life. Inexplicably, each scene finds the boy in a slightly different world where names change and allegiances shift. Pridamant watches, but only as the strange tale reaches its conclusion does he learn the ultimate truth about his son.

The Illusion has a lighter mood than Kushner's most famous play, Angels in America, but the two plays share a love of poetic dialogue and theatricality.

An excerpt from The Illusion acts as the epigraph to Gillian Flynn's 2012 novel Gone Girl.

== Character list ==
- Pridamont of Avignon, a Lawyer
- The Amanuensis, servant to Alcandre/ Geronte, father of Isabelle
- Alcandre, a Magician
- Calisto/ Clindor/ Theogenes, son of Pridamont
- Melibea/ Isabelle/ Hippolyta, beloved/ wife of C/C/T
- Elicia/ Lyse/ Clarina, maid/ friend of M/I/H
- Pleribo/ Adraste/ Prince Florilame, rival of C/C/T
- Matamore, a lunatic

== Setting ==
The play is set in the 17th century in the dark cave of the magician Alcandre, near Remulac, a small town in the south of France.

== Publication ==
The Illusion is published by Broadway Play Publishing Inc. in the collection Plays By Tony Kushner as well as in an acting edition.

== Citations ==
Kushner, Tony (31 December 2003). The Illusion. Broadway Play Publishing Inc. ISBN 9780881452310
