= Stephen Brimson Lewis =

British scenic designer

Stephen Brimson Lewis is a British scenic designer. Director of Design for the Royal Shakespeare Company, he is also known for his work on the London theatre. He has also designed for opera and film. He won an Olivier Award for Best Set Design in 1995 for his work on Les Parents Terribles and Design for Living. He has also been nominated for a Tony Award and Drama Desk Award.

== Theatre design at the RSC ==
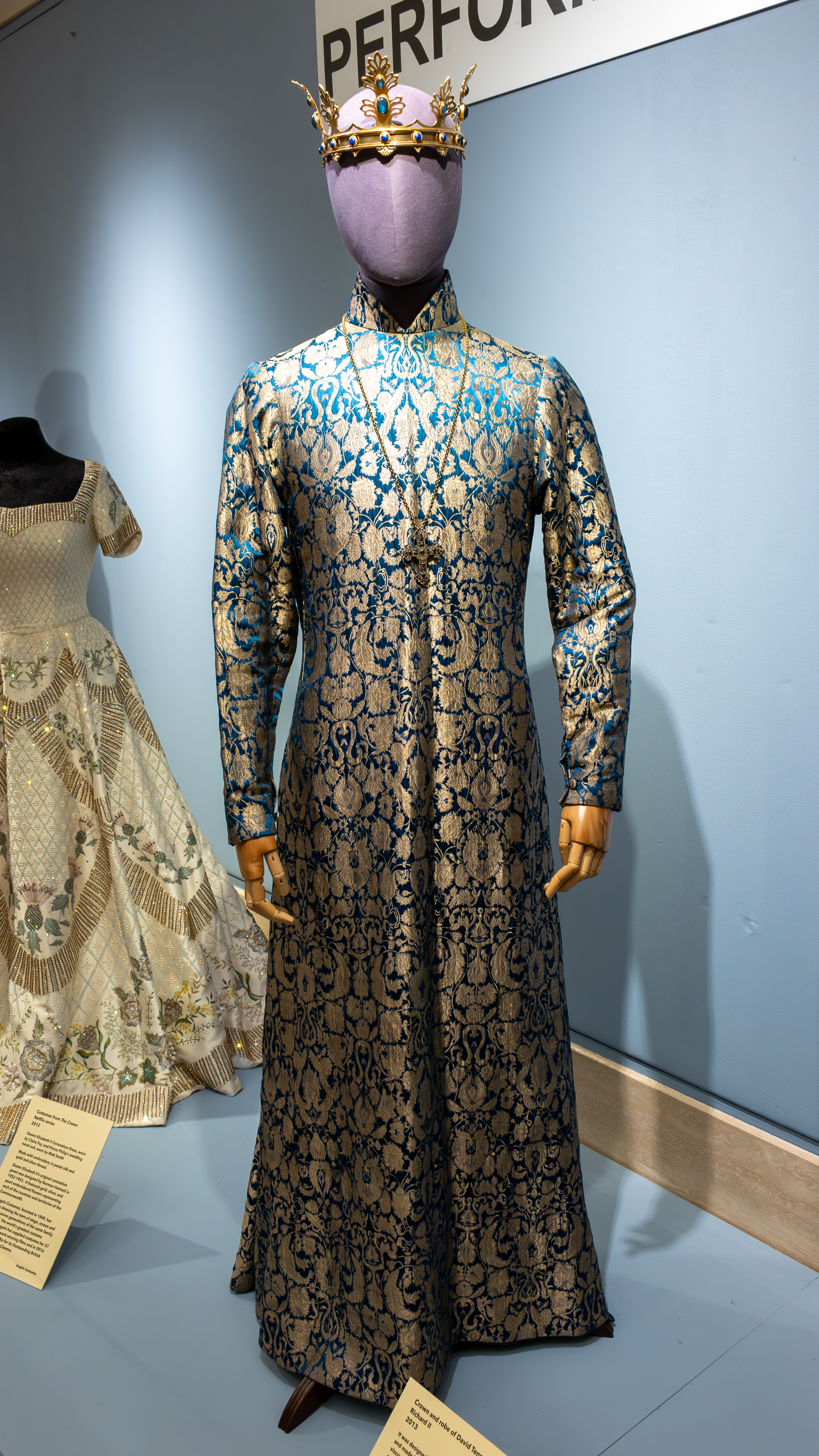
Crown and robe designed by Lewis for Richard II (2013)

He has worked closely with RSC Artistic Director Gregory Doran designing the following productions:

- Timon Of Athens (1999)
- Macbeth (1999)
- King John (2001)
- Much Ado About Nothing (2002, Evening Standard Award nomination)
- All's Well That Ends Well (2003)
- The Taming Of The Shrew (2003)
- Othello (2004)
- The Tamer Tamed (2004)
- A Midsummer Night's Dream (2005)
- Antony And Cleopatra (2006)
- The Merry Wives Of Windsor (2006)
- Richard II (2013)
- Henry IV Parts One and Two (2014)
- Death Of A Salesman (2015)
- The Tempest (2016)

Other design credits for the RSC include: Volpone, Julius Caesar and Believe What You Will.

Productions for the National Theatre include: A Little Night Music, Marat Sade, Private Lives, Inadmissible Evidence, Uncle Vanya, Somewhere, Once In A While The Odd Thing Happens, Rose, Les Parents Terribles and The American Clock.

West End design credits include: Waiting For Godot, Design For Living, Relative Values, The Lion In Winter, The Tempest, Flare Path, An Ideal Husband, Ghosts, Acorn Antiques The Musical, Dirty Dancing, Stephen Fry's Cinderella, Arsenic And Old Lace, Mahler's Conversion, Our Song, Jeffrey Bernard Is Unwell and Mrs. Klein.

International credits include: Waiting For Godot/ No Man's Land, Indiscretions and Rose(Broadway), Julius Caesar (Japan), Dirty Dancing (worldwide) .Joseph's Legende for the Deutsche Staatsoper, The Turn Of The Screw for Sydney Opera House, Otello for Vienna State Opera and Dorian Gray for Monte Carlo Opera .

Other design credits La Boheme for Welsh National Opera, Il Barbier De Seville for the Royal Opera House,

Production Designer on Bent (Film Four International/MGM) and Macbeth (RSC/Channel 4/illuminations). Costume Designer on the US mini series The Nightmare Years.
