= Phantom of the Opera (1976 musical) =

1976 musical by Ken Hill

- Logo
- Music: Various
- Lyrics: Ken Hill
- Book: Ken Hill
- Basis: The Phantom of the Opera by Gaston Leroux
- Productions: 1976 Lancaster; 1984 Newcastle; 1989 US Tour; 1991 West End

Phantom of the Opera is a musical with lyrics and a book by Ken Hill. It is based on the 1910 novel The Phantom of the Opera by Gaston Leroux. Hill wrote the original lyrics to the music of Giuseppe Verdi, Charles Gounod, Jacques Offenbach, Wolfgang Amadeus Mozart, Carl Maria von Weber, Gaetano Donizetti and Arrigo Boito. It premiered in Lancaster, Lancashire, England, in 1976, had a West End production in 1991, and has had further international productions.

== Synopsis ==
=== Act I ===
The story begins ("Introduction") with Richard, new manager of the Paris Opera House (previously president of Northern Railways and a member of the Stock Exchange Choir), greeted by the artists and staff ("Welcome Sir, I'm So Delighted"). The previous managers of the Paris Opera did not last very long, due to problems with the legend of the Opera Ghost, who demands 20,000 francs a month and his own private box. These requests are defied by the adamant and foolish Richard, little knowing the mayhem that will take place if he refuses to accept the Ghost's demands. Madame Giry, the box keeper, warns Richard that he may have upset the "Ghost". She is horrified when Richard demands use of Box Five (the Ghost's box). She knows the "Ghost" will not stand idly by while Richard refuses to accept his demands. She warns Richard to expect a run of horrific events.

The evening performance begins ("Accursed All Base Pursuit of Earthly Pleasure"). The ghost provides his first warning in the form of the murder of Mephistopheles. After the performance, Richard's handsome (if somewhat dim) son Raoul, who is madly in love with the chorus girl Christine Daae, goes to her dressing room, only to hear her speak with another man. Jealous, Raoul enters the room to find it empty. This "ghost" seems very real, as is his love for Christine and woe betide anyone who gets in his way ("How Dare She").

A Groom comes to talk to Richard in his office about the disappearance of a horse named Caesar ("Late Last Night I'm In The Cellars"). Richard decides that the man is an idiot and promptly fires him. Raoul, feeling betrayed, meets with Christine at a local graveyard ("All Of My Dreams Faded Suddenly"). He is then introduced to the angelic voice of the Angel Of Music ("While Floating High Above"). Christine leaves and the Phantom attempts to throttle Raoul, but is disturbed by a Grave Digger, and runs off. Back at the Opera House, the unfortunate Richard has had to stand by while his son pursues the chorus girl Christine Daae and now must convince his diva Carlotta, who feels she is too ill to perform, to sing at the performance later that evening, with the help of his staff ("She Says She's Got The Nodules"). An agreement is made that Christine Daae will sing the role, while Carlotta mimes the act.

This was not what the Phantom had in mind. He'll not cease causing "accidents" and will do all in his power to disrupt the proceedings, including rubbing out the lead singer. At the evening performance, Carlotta mimes the act incorrectly and very clearly out of sync with Christine ("What Do I See"). Christine faints before the end of the performance and Carlotta starts to croak like a frog, causing her to stop the performance. Laughing madly, the Phantom declares to the whole stage that Carlotta is bringing down the chandelier. But then, he finds the chandelier is the wrong one and switches it to a candelabra, dropping it on Carlotta.

After the performance, Christine and Raoul meet on the rooftop of the Opera House to discuss running away from the Opera House and the Phantom together. But the Phantom isn't very far away at all. He appears from behind the statue of Apollo and towers above them ("To Pain My Heart Selfishly Dooms Me"). Christine and Raoul leave the roof, leaving the Phantom alone. An old man enters, throwing bird-seed down for the pigeons on the Opera House's roof. The Phantom's hurt turns to anger, and he throws the unfortunate man off the building. He screams that Christine will be his and the first act ends.

=== Act II ===
A performance of Faust begins with Christine singing the lead role of Marguerite ("Ah! Do I Hear My Lover's Voice?"). However, during the song there's an unscheduled blackout and when the lights come back up, Christine has disappeared. The show quickly adjourns and the rest of the cast search high and low for her all over the Opera House, taking their lanterns into the audience ("No Sign! I See No Sign!"). But to no avail. The scene switches to the Phantom's underground domain, where he has kidnapped Christine in his boat and ties her to a post at his mist-shrouded dock before rowing slowly back into the darkness, leaving Christine behind ("Somewhere Above The Sun Shines Bright").

Meanwhile, the search party above ground migrates to the boiler room and the Persian reveals his true identity and fills us in on the Phantom's history ("Born with a Monstrous Countenance"). Raoul searches for a way down to the cellars below the Opera House ("In the Shadows, Dim and Dreay"). He succeeds and slips through a manhole with the rest of the group, into a boiler room. However things quickly heat up, literally, as the Phantom traps them inside. It looks like the end for the motley group, and they break into a chorus of ("What an Awful Way to Perish").

The final scene takes place in the Phantom's Chapel, with his organ and its unkempt riot of sheet music as a center-piece. He seems determined to wed Christine and expresses his love for her ("Ne'er Forsake Me, Here Remain"). As the song ends, Christine tears off his mask and the Phantom screams in anger and shame, hiding his face from Christine. His sobs fade, and he turns back, with a determined and violent look in his eyes, and produces a priest and chorus girl to bear witness to the forced marriage between him and Christine. But just in time, Raoul, the Persian and the rest of the group burst in, having escaped the Boiler Room and come through The Phantom's traps. The Phantom, suddenly finding himself in a tight spot, produces a knife and pulls Christine in front of him. In act of love to Christine, the Phantom stabs himself with his own dagger and dies in Christine's arms ("Ne'er Forsake me, Here Remain"). Christine remarks that the Phantom was always the angel of music ("He Will Not Go Without A Friend").

== Characters and West End cast ==
- Jammes – Kate Harbour
- M. Richard – Reginald Marsh
- Rémy – Gary Lyons
- Debienne/Groom/Priest – Richard Tate
- Raoul – Steven Pacey
- Mephistopheles/The Persian – Haluk Bilginer
- Faust – Michael McLean
- Madam Giry – Toni Palmer
- Christine Daaé – Christina Collier
- La Carlotta/Dominique – Tracy Gillman
- The Phantom – Peter Straker
- The Stage Hand – Quentin Maclaine
- 2nd Stage Hand – Richard Shilling
- Lisette – Jacqueline Barron

== Musical numbers ==
Act I

- Welcome Sir I'm So Delighted (Music: Offenbach, La Vie Parisienne) – Debienne, Rémy, Faust, Mephistopheles, Richard, Raoul, Jammes
- Accursed All Base Pursuit of Earthly Pleasure (Music: Gounod, Faust) – Faust
- How Dare She (Music: Verdi, Simon Boccanegra) – Raoul
- Late Last Night I'm In the Cellars (Music: Boito, Mefistofele) – The Groom
- Love Has Flown, Never Returning (Music: Offenbach, Les contes d'Hoffmann) – Christine*
  - All of My Dreams Faded Suddenly (Music: Dvořák, Rusalka) – Christine
- While Floating High Above (Music: Bizet, Les pêcheurs de perles) – The Phantom
- She Says She's Got the Nodules (Music: Offenbach, La Vie Parisienne) – Faust, Carlotta, Richard, Rémy, Jammes, Debienne, Christine
- What Do I See (Music: Gounod, Faust) – Christine (as Carlotta)
- To Pain My Heart Selfishly Dooms Me (Music: Offenbach, Les contes d'Hoffmann) – The Phantom, Raoul, Christine

Act II

- The Entr'Acte
- Ah! Do I Hear My Lover's Voice? (Music: Gounod, Faust) – Faust, Christine
- No Sign! I See No Sign! (Music: Weber, Der Freischütz; and Verdi, Un Ballo in Maschera) – Debienne, Richard, Raoul, Rémy, Dominique, Faust, Jammes, Madam Giry
- Somewhere Above the Sun Shines Bright (Music: Verdi, Il Corsaro) – Christine
- Born With a Monstrous Countenance (Music: Verdi, Attila) – The Persian
- In The Shadows, Dim and Dreary (Music: Verdi, Il Trovatore) – Raoul, The Persian
- 'What An Awful Way to Perish (Music: Donizetti, Lucia di Lammermoor) – Faust, The Persian, Madam Giry, Richard, Jammes, Raoul
- The Final Drama
  - Ne'er Forsake Me, Here Remain (Music: Gounod, Faust) – The Phantom
  - Ne'er Forsake Me, Here Remain (reprise) – The Phantom, Christine
  - He Will Not Go Without a Friend – (Music: Mozart, Don Giovanni) Company

*"All of My Dreams Faded Suddenly", for Christine, was added to the show in 1992 for the first Japanese tour, based upon an aria by Antonín Dvořák. It replaced "Love Has Flown, Never Returning", but not before the latter had been included in the West End cast recording.

== Productions ==
=== Original version ===
As Ken Hill rummaged through a used bookstore, he picked up a copy of The Phantom of the Opera and eventually produced it as a stage musical. The show started off as a production at Morecambe Pier as the first staged musical version, and then when Hill was working as Director of Productions for the Newcastle Playhouse. This first production was produced at The Duke’s Playhouse in Lancaster on 26 July 1976, where it proved to be a hit. It was directed by John Blackmore, designed by Clare Lyth, with musical direction by Gary Yershon. It differed from the later version of Ken Hill’s musical, in having a modern musical score by Ian Armit (who also worked with Hill on his musical The Curse of the Werewolf) in addition to excerpts from the opera Faust by Charles Gounod.

=== 1984 version and aborted collaboration with Lloyd Webber ===
In 1984, Hill revived his musical version of The Phantom of the Opera. This time though, he wanted to add the kind of music that would have been heard at the Opéra Garnier in the late 19th century. Consequently, he discarded Armit's score and wrote original English lyrics, that told Leroux’s tale, set to opera arias by Verdi, Gounod, Offenbach, Mozart, Weber, Donizetti, and Boito. This score better reflected the atmosphere of the era in which the novel was written. This updated version was produced jointly by the Newcastle Playhouse and the Theatre Royal Stratford East; it premiered at the Newcastle Playhouse on 3 April 1984, and soon moved to the Theatre Royal Stratford East. In between, the show had two brief runs at the New Tyne Theatre in Newcastle and the Grand Theatre in Wolverhampton; neither of those productions did very well. When the show got the Theatre Royal Stratford East, Sarah Brightman, who would create the role of Christine in the Lloyd Webber version, was asked to perform the role of Christine in the 1984 cast but she turned it down, leaving the role for the opera singer Christina Collier.

Andrew Lloyd Webber, who at the time was married to Brightman, and Cameron Mackintosh attended a performance of Hill’s Phantom at the Theatre Royal Stratford East. Prompted by the good reviews, they approached Hill about the possibility of their collaborating on developing a grand scale version of his adaptation in the West End and offered to produce it. Hill and Lloyd Webber had worked together earlier on a revival of Joseph and the Amazing Technicolor Dreamcoat at the Winchester Theatre. Lloyd Webber and Mackintosh had been enthusiastic when they broached the idea to Hill about his Phantom of the Opera. But in the end, Lloyd Webber chose to pursue the musical without Hill and developed his own version.

=== Subsequent productions ===
Hill's Phantom of the Opera premiered in America in 1987 at the Repertory Theatre of St. Louis. This production starred Sal Mistretta as The Phantom; his performance won him the St. Louis Theatre Critics Award. A second US production was mounted in 1988 in San Francisco at the Theatre in the Square, produced by Jonathan Reinis. The productions in St. Louis and San Francisco were so successful that Hill was asked to mount a national tour of the United States. Jonathan Reinis (who later produced Ken Hill’s The Invisible Man in London) formed the Phantom Touring Company, which acted as the producer for the tour, along with Electric Factory Concerts. The tour began in 1989, with musical arrangements and designs by the original Newcastle Playhouse team. It played for a few years to packed houses all over America, travelling to approximately 110 cities and grossing a total of $72 million.

In 1991, Phantom of the Opera returned to the United Kingdom, where it embarked on a national tour produced by Stewart Macpherson and then transferred to London’s West End. It opened at the Shaftesbury Theatre on 18 December 1991 with a similar cast to the 1984 production: Peter Straker was The Phantom, with Christina Collier as Christine. But despite positive reviews, the West End production did poorly at the box office at the time of IRA bombings and closed earlier than expected on 11 April 1992. However, the production was nominated for two Olivier Awards for Best New Musical and Best Director of a Musical.

Since 1992, Phantom of the Opera has been performed around the world, in countries such as New Zealand, Australia, Italy, Germany, Japan and Korea. The 2013 production in Tokyo, Japan, running from 19 to 29 December 2013 was produced by Stewart Macpherson, who originally produced the West End production in 1991. Other Tokyo productions included one in 2018. Another Tokyo production is set for January 2024, starring Ben Forster as The Phantom and Paul Potts as Faust.

== Recording ==
The official cast recording of the show was released in 1993 by D Sharp Records. It featured the entire West End cast. It was later released by two other record labels: Stetson Records (an offshoot of The Stetson Group) and BMG. The latter versions of the CD were mainly sold in Japan (in Japanese packaging), Australia and New Zealand, on national tours.
