= Valentin Tournet =

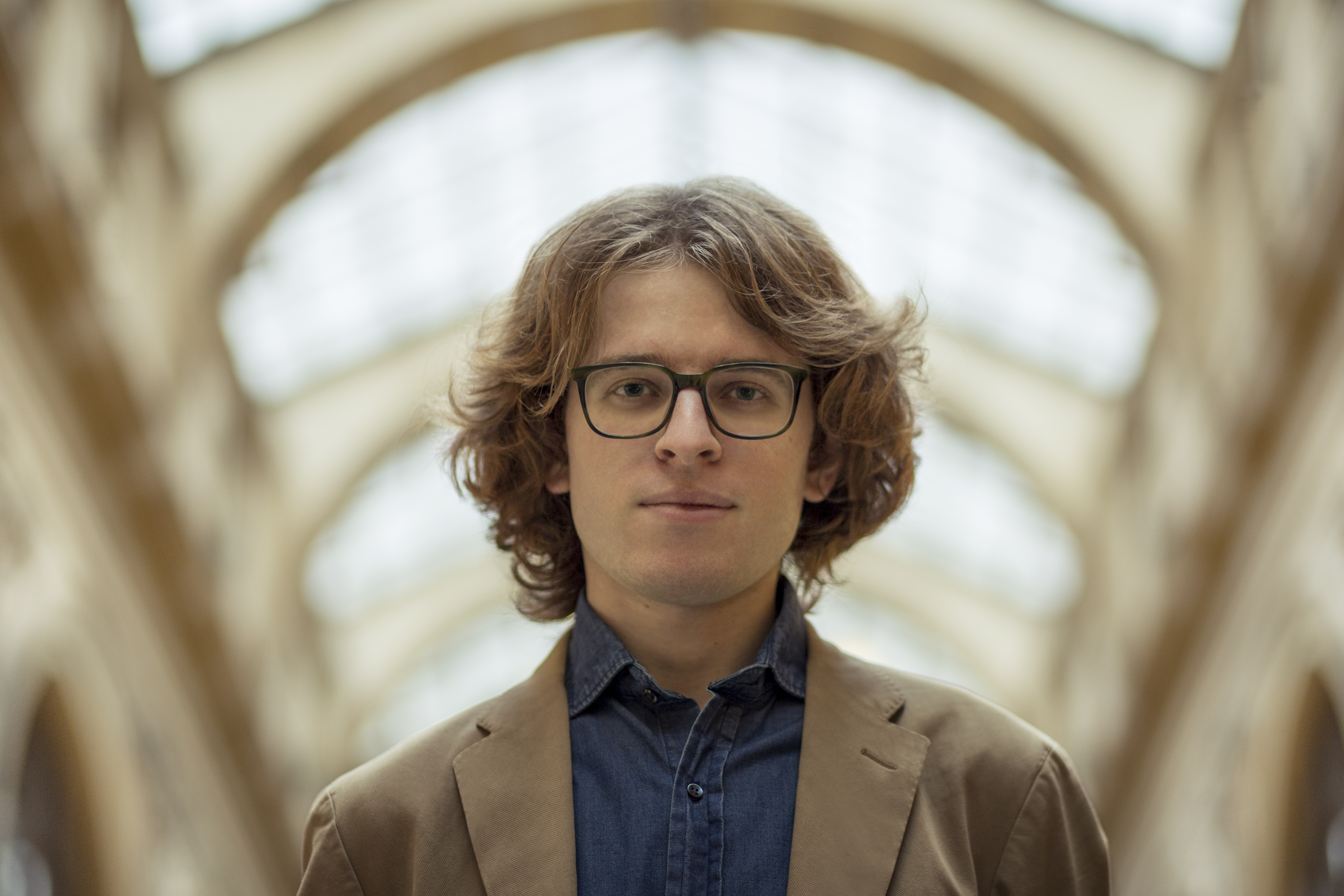
- Tournet in 2018

Background information
- Born: 1996 (age 29–30); La Garenne-Colombes, France
- Genres: Classical, early music
- Occupations: Conductor, gambist
- Instrument: Viola da gamba
- Formerly of: La Chapelle Harmonique
- Website: chapelleharmonique.com

Valentin Tournet (born 1996) is a French conductor, choral conductor and viola da gamba player.

== Early life and education ==
Born near Paris in 1996, he started the viola da gamba at the age of 5 following the shock of listening to the music of the movie Tous les Matins du Monde. He entered the Royal Conservatory of Brussels to study with Philippe Pierlot, then the Conservatoire de Paris with Christophe Coin and also receive advice from Jordi Savall.

He won first prizes (viola da gamba and chamber music) at the age of 14.

He participated in the children's choir of the Paris Opera and learned conducting with Pierre Cao. He met Philippe Herreweghe at the Festival de Saintes where his family comes from.

== Career ==
He made his debut in 2015 at the MAfestival Brugge and at the Festival Oude Muziek.

In 2017, during his studies at the Paris Conservatory, Valentin Tournet created the ensemble "La Chapelle Harmonique", a choir and a period-instrument orchestra and gave the first concerts at the Royal Chapel of the Palace of Versailles.

His performances of Bach sacred works are claimed as a “perfect balance between flesh and spirit“.

He is an artist in residence at the Fondation Singer-Polignac, then at the Festival d'Auvers-sur-Oise.

His meeting with the composer Thierry Escaich gives rise to a collaboration in 2018.

== Discography ==
- BACH, J.S. - Magnificat BWV 243a - Cantate BWV 63 - La Chapelle Harmonique - Château de Versailles Spectacles
