= The Card (musical) =

Musical

- Music: Tony Hatch; Jackie Trent
- Lyrics: Tony Hatch; Jackie Trent
- Book: Keith Waterhouse; Willis Hall
- Basis: Arnold Bennett's 1911 novel The Card
- Productions: 1973 West End; 1994 West End revival

The Card is a musical with a book by Keith Waterhouse and Willis Hall and music and lyrics by Tony Hatch and Jackie Trent.

Based on Arnold Bennett's 1911 comedic novel of the same name, it chronicles the rise of Denry Machin from washerwoman's son to Mayor of Bursley through initiative, guile, and luck.

Cameron Mackintosh's West End production opened on 24 July 1973 at the Queen's Theatre where it ran for 130 performances. Directed by Val May and choreographed by Gillian Lynne, it starred Jim Dale, Millicent Martin, Joan Hickson, Marti Webb, and Eleanor Bron.

The 1994 revival at the Open Air Theatre in Regent's Park, London, starred Peter Duncan, Jessica Martin, Hayley Mills, and Jenna Russell and was extensively re-worked by the original authors with lyricist Anthony Drewe. Amendments were made to the libretto, existing songs were re-written and others dropped and new ones introduced. This production was also presented in Moscow as part of a cultural exchange program, one of the first times a western-style musical was staged in the former Soviet Union.

An original 1973 cast recording was re-released on compact disc by First Night Records in 1992 but is no longer in print; a recording of the 1994 production is currently available on CD and digital download.

== Song list (Original Version) ==
- Hallelujah!
- Nine Till Five
- Lead Me
- Universal White Kid Gloves
- Nobody Thought of It
- Moving On
- That Once a Year Feeling
- Come Along and Join Us
- That's the Way the Money Grows
- I Could Be the One
- The Card
- Opposite Your Smile
- Nothing Succeeds Like Success
- The Right Man
- Nobody Thought of It (Reprise)

== Song list (1994 revival) ==
- Typical Machin
- Another Time, Another Place
- You'll Do
- How Do
- Nobody Thought Of It
- Rents
- Moving On
- Time To Spend (Beside The Sea)
- Lock, Stock & Barrel
- Is It Just Me?
- Typical Machin (Reprise)
- That's The Way The Money Grows
- If Only
- Countess of Chell
- The Card
- Opposite Your Smile
- If Only (Reprise)
- Moving On (Reprise)
- Is It Just Me (Reprise)

== Synopsis ==
The show begins when "Edward Henry Machin first saw the smoke on the 27th May 1867"—the very day of Bennett's own birth. At age 12, Denry begins his career by altering his grade in a class enough to earn him a scholarship to grammar school. At 16, he leaves school to work for Mr. Duncalf, the town clerk and a solicitor. Duncalf is responsible for organizing an exclusive ball; Denry "invites" himself and a few others in exchange for favors, among them Ruth Earp, a dance instructor. On a bet, he audaciously asks the energetic, beautiful Countess of Chell (of whom everyone, including Machin, is in awe) to dance, thus earning himself the reputation of a "card" (a "character", someone able to set tongues wagging) – a reputation he is determined to cement.

Later, when Duncalf treats a disgruntled client brusquely, Denry leaves his employ after persuading the client to hire him as a rent collector. When some of the tenants fall behind, he begins loaning them money (at a highly profitable interest rate). Ruth herself is several months in arrears and tries to sneak away in the middle of the night. Denry catches her by accident, but rather than being angry, he admires her audacity and starts courting her.

While on vacation at the seaside resort town of Llandudno with Ruth and her friend Nellie Cotterill, he witnesses a shipwreck and the rescue of the sailors. Noting the interest generated, he buys a lifeboat, hires some of the stranded mariners as rowers, and conducts tours of the picturesque wreck. However, Ruth's spendthrift nature becomes alarmingly apparent during the trip and they break up.

By the end of the summer, Denry has made a substantial profit from the sightseers, which he uses to finance his boldest venture. He starts up the Five Towns Universal Thrift Club. Members deposit money little by little; once they have accumulated half the sum they need to purchase whatever it is they want, the club allows them to buy on credit, but only from stores associated with the club. Denry makes money by getting a discount from the vendors in return for access to his large customer base. When his capital starts to run out, he arranges an "accident" for the Countess's coach. He drives conveniently by and gives her a lift to an urgent appointment. On the way there, he talks her into becoming the club's sponsor, ensuring easy financing. This proves to be the making of Denry's fortune.

With his great success, he is appointed a town councillor. He also backs a new daily newspaper (to be bought out at a profit by its established rival anxious to keep its monopoly) and tricks his obstinate mother into moving into a luxurious new house. At this point, Ruth reappears in Denry's life, now the widow of a rich older man. He considers renewing their relationship, but at the last moment, realizes that Nellie is the one for him and marries her.

The crowning achievement comes when Denry decides to become the youngest mayor in the history of Bursley. To sway the voters, he purchases the rights to native son Callear, the "greatest centre forward in England", for the failing local football club.
