= David Toguri =

Canadian choreographer

- Born: 25 October 1933; Vancouver, British Columbia, Canada
- Died: 15 November 1997 (aged 64); Toronto, Ontario, Canada
- Education: Jarvis Collegiate Institute; Toronto Theatre Ballet
- Occupations: Dancer; choreographer; theatre director; actor

David Toguri (25 October 1933 – 15 November 1997) was a Canadian dancer, choreographer, theatre director and actor, who spent most of his career in the United Kingdom.

== Early life ==
A Nisei (second-generation) Japanese Canadian, Toguri was born in Vancouver in 1933, and raised in Toronto after the Second World War. He attended Jarvis Collegiate Institute. As a young man, he admired Gene Kelly, and studied dance under Boris Volkoff at the Toronto Theatre Ballet.

He got his big break as a dancer in the Broadway musical Flower Drum Song, appearing in the film 1961 film version as well. He first came to the United Kingdom in 1960, when Flower Drum Song transferred to the West End.

== Stage choreography credits ==
- The Baker's Wife. Phoenix Theatre. Directed by Trevor Nunn.
- Measure for Measure. Directed by Trevor Nunn.
- The Blue Angel. Directed by Trevor Nunn.
- The Rocky Horror Show
- Street Scene. London Coliseum for English National Opera.
- Pacific Overtures. London Coliseum for English National Opera.
- Gulliver's Travels Mermaid Theatre Directed Gerald Frow Sean Kenny
- Many shows at the National Theatre including The Threepenny Opera and The Beggar's Opera and Guys and Dolls (1982) which won the Olivier Award for Best Choreography. He also directed and choreographed the show in Australia in 1986 and returned to the National production for its 1996 revival.
- "Pa Pa Can You Hear Me Sing" (1989). A musical in Cantonese, directed by Ho Yi for Spotlight Productions, for the Urban Council, Hong Kong
- Blitz! (1990). Playhouse Theatre for the National Youth Theatre.
- Maggie May (1992). Royalty Theatre for the National Youth Theatre.

== Film and television choreography credits ==
- Peter's Friends (1992) (choreographer)
- Memphis Belle (1990) (choreographer)
- Mack the Knife (1990) (choreographer) aka The Threepenny Opera
- Who Framed Roger Rabbit (1988) (choreographer: UK)
- The Little Match Girl (1987) (TV) (choreographer)
- Absolute Beginners (1986) (choreographer)
- Give My Regards to Broad Street (1984) (choreographer)
- Jazzin' for Blue Jean (1984) (V) (choreographer)
- Blue Money (1982) (TV) (choreographer)
- The Rocky Horror Picture Show (1975) (dance stager)
- Eskimo Nell (1975) (choreographer) aka The Ballad of Eskimo Nell
- The Wednesday Play (choreographer) (1 episode, 1970)
- No Trams to Lime Street (1970) TV Episode (choreographer)
- The Devil Rides Out (1968) (choreographer) aka The Devil's Bride (USA)
- Rock Follies (1976) (choreographer)

== Acting credits ==
- Flower Drum Song Movie . . . dancer
- Flower Drum Song Broadway cast Dancer
- Flower Drum Song (1961, Palace Theatre) .... Dancer (uncredited)
- Chaganog (1964) Edinburgh Festival and subsequently at the Vaudeville Theatre
- Charlie Girl (1965) .... Adelphi Theatre
- Three Hats for Lisa (1965) (UK) .... Dancer aka One Day in London
- Koroshi (1966) (TV) (UK: series title) .... Commander Yamada aka Danger Man: Koroshi
- You Only Live Twice (1967, aka Ian Fleming's You Only Live Twice (USA: complete title) .... Assassin in Bedroom
- Shinda Shima (1968, TV Episode) .... Commander Yamada
- Danger Man (1 episode, 1968) aka Secret Agent aka Danger Man (USA: video box title) .... Commander Yamada
- There's a Nasty Word (1969, TV Episode – Love) .... Ibuki
- The Troubleshooters (1969, 1 episode, - aka Mogul (USA) .... Ibuki
- Welcome to the Club (1971) .... Hideki Ikada
- Rentadick (1972) .... Japanese
- Soft Beds, Hard Battles (1974) .... A.D.C. to Prince Kyoto (uncredited)
- Eskimo Nell (1975, aka The Ballad of Eskimo Nell) .... Kung Fu Artist
- The Pounds Sterling (1976, TV Episode) .... Alan Nagouchi
- Rock Follies (1 episode, 1976) .... Alan Nagouchi
- Dead Man's Kit (1980, TV Episode) .... Chinese laundry man
- Armchair Thriller (1 episode, 1980) .... Chinese laundry man
- Alicja (1982, aka Alice) .... Duchess (final film role)
