= Ken Hill (playwright) =

English playwright and theatre director

- Born: 28 January 1937; Birmingham, England
- Died: 23 January 1995 (aged 57)
- Occupations: Playwright and theatre director
- Notable work: Phantom of the Opera
- Spouse: Toni Palmer (second wife)
- Children: 2 sons (from first marriage)

Ken Hill (28 January 1937 – 23 January 1995) was an English playwright and theatre director.

Ken Hill was a protégé of Joan Littlewood at Theatre Workshop. He was known for his chaotic musicals on the tiny stage of the old Theatre Royal Stratford East, Theatre Workshop's home in Stratford, London, but he also had hits in the West End and abroad. Among them were The Invisible Man and the original stage version of Phantom of the Opera, which inspired Andrew Lloyd Webber to create his musical blockbuster of the same title.

== Biography ==
Ken Hill was born in Birmingham, England on 28 January 1937. He was educated at King Edward VI's Grammar School, Camp Hill, Birmingham, after which he joined an amateur theatrical company, Crescent Theatre, sweeping the floor, making props, writing and directing. His first play, Night Season, was put on at the Alexandra Theatre, Birmingham, in 1963. For a time, he worked as an investigative journalist for ATV and it was there that he caused controversy with his report on corruption in Birmingham's local government.

In 1970, Joan Littlewood's Theatre Workshop returned to the Theatre Royal Stratford East. A satire on local authorities was discussed as a good subject for a new production, and Hill's name was put forward as a possible writer. The result of the collaboration Hill's Forward Up Your End (1970) was criticised by some of the press for its juvenile humor, but Joan Littlewood liked it and Hill stayed on.

Hill worked as an actor in numerous productions but preferred writing. He was made associate director and resident writer at Theatre Workshop from 1970 to 1974 and from 1974 to 1976 he took over as artistic director, Joan Littlewood by this time having left for projects in Tunisia.

Hill's productions there included Is Your Doctor Really Necessary? (1973), a collaboration with songwriter Tony Macaulay, The Count of Monte Cristo (1974), Gentlemen Prefer Anything (1974) and Dracula (1974). He then became artistic director of the Musical Theatre Company, directing for the West End: Joseph and the Amazing Technicolor Dreamcoat at the Westminster Theatre (for Andrew Lloyd Webber), The Mikado, and Fiddler on the Roof. Other West End credits include Playdoctoring productions of Drake's Dream and Wren.

Shortly after, he was commissioned by the National Theatre for a version of The Hunchback of Notre-Dame. He then wrote and directed for television: All the Fun of the Fair – in the course of his life, Hill wrote over 100 scripts for various television programs. His other commissions for various theatres include: The Curse of the Werewolf, The Mummy's Tomb, Mafeking, The Three Musketeers, Bel Ami, The Living Dead, and a new translation of Jacques Offenbach's La Vie parisienne. Hill was also commissioned for productions of Sweeney Todd, Little Shop of Horrors, and a Narnia trilogy. He also adapted and directed two books by Catherine Cookson and completed a third for the Birmingham Repertory Theatre.

He left Theatre Workshop in 1976 and worked for some years as the Director of Productions at the Newcastle Playhouse. That same year, he first staged his version of Phantom of the Opera at the Duke's Playhouse in Lancaster (and also on Morecambe Pier). In 1983, he adapted Catherine Cookson's Katie Mulholland into a stage musical for the Playhouse with songs by Eric Boswell. In 1984, an updated version of Phantom of the Opera was revived and produced in a joint production with the Newcastle Playhouse and the Theatre Royal Stratford East. Andrew Lloyd Webber was inspired by the production and wrote his musical The Phantom of the Opera, which opened in the West End in 1986 after talks of staging Hill's version fell through. Hill's Phantom went abroad to St. Louis in the United States in 1987 and had another major production in San Francisco in 1988. The musical then embarked on a two-year-long national tour of the US from 1989 to 1991. The show also transferred to the West End in 1991 but, despite excellent notices, did badly at the box office and was forced to close earlier than expected. Since then, Phantom of the Opera has arguably become one of his most famous works and has toured the world – the most recent production was in Tokyo, Japan in November 2004.

The Invisible Man, with illusions by the magician, Paul Kieve, fared much better in the West End, transferring from Stratford East to the Vaudeville Theatre in 1993. This show was a particular favorite of Hill's, combining his love of stage trickery and optical jokes, including the unbandaged 'invisible' head of the Invisible Man smoking a cigar. At his request, everyone working in the theatre, from the cleaning staff upwards, signed a document forbidding them to reveal how this was done to the press.

Despite having cancer intermittently for 12 years, Hill was a prolific writer and sent Stratford East ideas for new productions right up until his death from cancer on 23 January 1995 aged 57. He died just two weeks before the opening of what was his final production, Zorro The Musical!, which he directed. Zorro opened on 14 February 1995, to rave reviews and immense box office success.

== Other information ==
The Ken Hill Memorial Trust was set up after Hill died in 1995, to aid the Theatre Royal in supporting new talent in musical theatre. It now offers a biennial Musical Theatre Award to help nurture new talent in theatrical writers. The award in 1997 was a total of £5,000 for the winner – £1000 in cash, with the balance going towards the production costs of a week's showcase at the Theatre Royal, where many of Ken Hill's works were premiered. In addition, royalties were paid to the writer for the showcase. The trustees also offered small cash prizes to five runners-up.

There are also "Ken Hill awards" for talented new playwrights and for Best New Musical.
