= List of Tom Hiddleston performances =

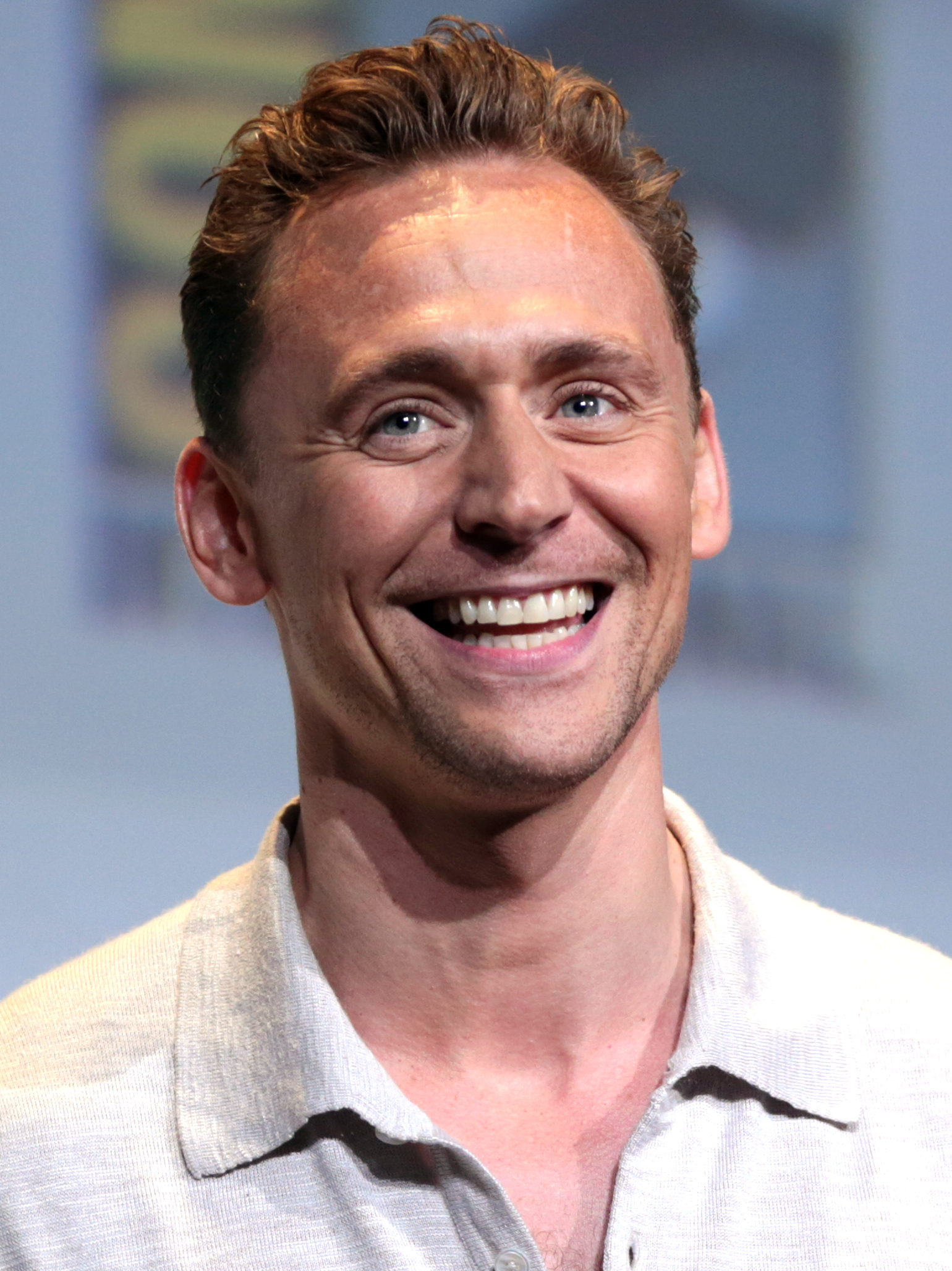
Speaking at the 2016 San Diego Comic-Con for Kong: Skull Island

Tom Hiddleston is a British actor who has appeared in film, television series and on stage. Hiddleston made his film debut in the 2007 drama Unrelated which was directed by Joanna Hogg. He worked with Hogg again in the 2010 film Archipelago. In 2008, he appeared on stage alongside Kenneth Branagh in the play Ivanov. It was Branagh who encouraged him to audition for the role of Thor in the 2011 Marvel Studios film of the same name that Branagh was directing. After auditioning for Thor, Branagh thought he would be better suited for the role of Loki which then earned Hiddleston international recognition and the Empire Award for Best Male Newcomer. He then reprised the role in The Avengers (2012), Thor: The Dark World (2013), Thor: Ragnarok (2017), Avengers: Infinity War (2018), Avengers: Endgame (2019), Ant-Man and the Wasp: Quantumania (2023) and in the spin-off television series Loki (2021–2023).

He has appeared in films such as Steven Spielberg's war film War Horse (2011), The Deep Blue Sea with Rachel Weisz (2011), Woody Allen's romantic comedy Midnight in Paris (2011), Jim Jarmusch's fantasy comedy-drama Only Lovers Left Alive (2013) and Guillermo del Toro's gothic romance film Crimson Peak (2015). Also in 2015, he starred in the biographical drama I Saw the Light as country music singer Hank Williams. In 2017, he starred alongside Brie Larson and Samuel L. Jackson in the monster movie Kong: Skull Island.

His television credits include being a series regular on the 2006 British satirical black comedy television series Suburban Shootout with Ruth Wilson, on the crime drama series Wallander with Branagh from 2008–2010, the BBC series Henry IV, Part I and Part II (2012) with Jeremy Irons and as the title character in Henry V (2012). In 2016, he starred as Jonathan Pine in the British spy serial The Night Manager with Elizabeth Debicki and Hugh Laurie. That role earned him a Golden Globe Award for Best Actor in a Miniseries or Television Film.

Hiddleston starred as the title character in a production of Coriolanus (2013–14) and again as the title character in a limited run of William Shakespeare's Hamlet directed by Kenneth Branagh (2017). He made his Broadway debut in a 2019 revival of Betrayal with Zawe Ashton and Charlie Cox.

== Film ==
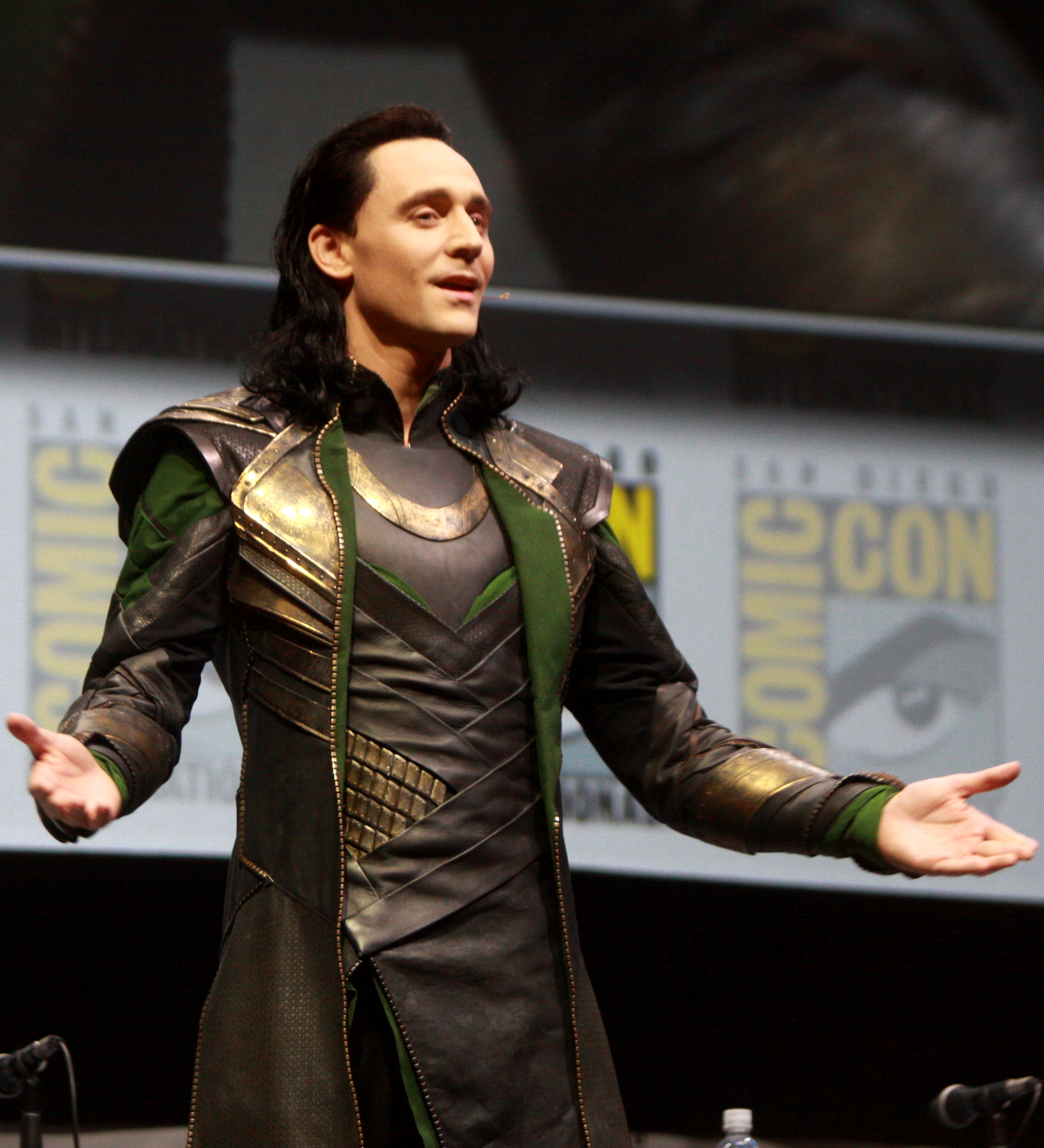
Hiddleston dressed as his character Loki at the 2013 San Diego Comic-Con

Year	Title	Role	Notes	Refs.
2007	Unrelated	Oakley / George's son		
2010	Archipelago	Edward		
2011	Thor	Loki Laufeyson		
2011	Midnight in Paris	F. Scott Fitzgerald		
2011	The Deep Blue Sea	Freddie Page		
2011	War Horse	Captain Nicholls		
2012	The Avengers	Loki Laufeyson		
2013	Only Lovers Left Alive	Adam		
2013	Exhibition	Jamie Macmillan		
2013	Muse of Fire	Himself	Documentary	
2013	Thor: The Dark World	Loki Laufeyson		
2014	Muppets Most Wanted	The Great Escapo	Cameo	
2014	The Pirate Fairy	James	Voice	
2015	Avengers: Age of Ultron	Loki Laufeyson	Deleted scene	
2015	Unity	Narrator	Documentary	
2015	Crimson Peak	Thomas Sharpe		
2015	High-Rise	Laing		
2015	I Saw the Light	Hank Williams		
2017	Kong: Skull Island	James Conrad		
2017	Thor: Ragnarok	Loki Laufeyson		
2018	Early Man	Lord Nooth	Voice	
2018	Avengers: Infinity War	Loki Laufeyson		
2019	Avengers: Endgame	Loki Laufeyson		
2023	Ant-Man and the Wasp: Quantumania	Loki Laufeyson	Cameo	
2024	The Life of Chuck	Charles "Chuck" Krantz		
2026	Avengers Endgame: Encore	Loki Laufeyson	Extended version of Avengers: Endgame	
2026	Tenzing	Edmund Hillary		
2026	Avengers: Doomsday †	Loki Laufeyson	Post-production	

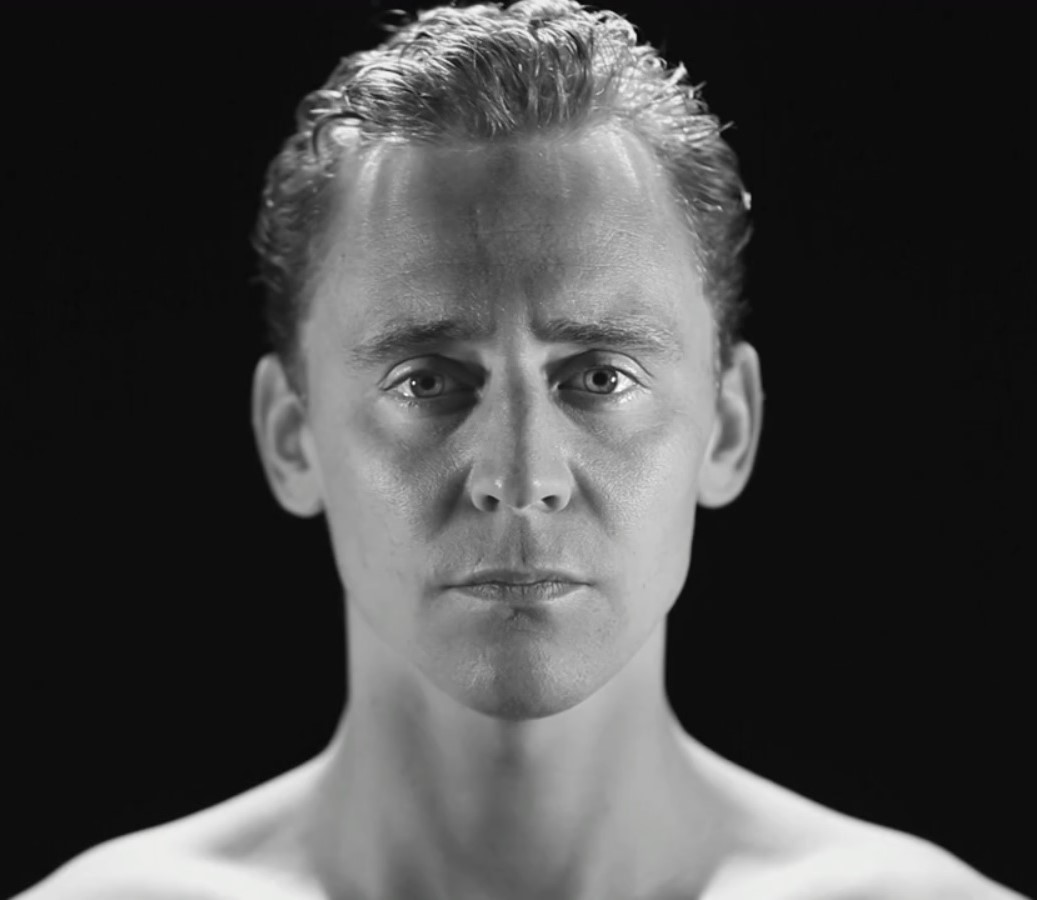
Hiddleston in a frame from the 2013 short film Out of Darkness

=== Short films ===
Year	Title	Role	Notes	Refs.
2010	How to Be the Life of a Cocktail Party	Narrator		
2011	Friend Request Pending	Tom		
2012	Out of Time	James		
2013	Out of Darkness	Male		
2015	WillShake Henry V	Narrator		
2018	Leading Lady Parts	Himself		
2021	The Simpsons: The Good, the Bart, and the Loki	Loki Laufeyson	Voice, animated	
2022	The Simpsons: Welcome to the Club	Loki Laufeyson	Voice, animated	

== Television ==
Year	Title	Role	Notes	Refs.
2001	The Life and Adventures of Nicholas Nickleby	Lord	Television film	
2001	Conspiracy	Phone Operator	Television film	
2001	Armadillo	Toby Sherrifmuir	Television film	
2002	The Gathering Storm	Randolph Churchill	Television film	
2005	A Waste of Shame	John Hall	Television film	
2006	Victoria Cross Heroes	Capt. 'Jack' Randle	Episode: "The Modern Age"	
2006	Suburban Shootout	Bill Hazeldine	Recurring role	
2006	Galápagos	Charles Darwin (voice)	Episode: "Islands that Changed the World"	
2007	Casualty	Chris Vaughn	Episode: "The Killing Floor"	
2008	Miss Austen Regrets	Mr. John Plumptre	Television film	
2008–2010	Wallander	Magnus Martinsson	Recurring role	
2009	Return to Cranford	William Buxton	2 episodes	
2009	Darwin's Secret Notebooks	Charles Darwin (voice)	Documentary	
2012	Robot Chicken	Lorax Narrator (voice)	Episode: "Butchered in Burbank"	
2012	The Hollow Crown	Prince Hal / King Henry V	Episodes: "Henry IV, Part I and Part II", "Henry V"	
2013	Family Guy	Statue Griffin (voice)	Episode: "No Country Club for Old Men"	
2014	Top Gear	Special Guest	Series 21, Episode 2	
2016–present	The Night Manager	Jonathan Pine	Lead role; also executive producer	
2016	Trollhunters	Kanjigar the Courageous (voice)	Episode: "Becoming: Part 1"	
2019	Celebrating Marvel's Stan Lee	Self/Presenter	TV special documentary	
2020	20/20 Chadwick Boseman: A Tribute for a King	Himself	Season 43, Episode 35	
2020–2021	Earth at Night in Color	Narrator	Documentary series	
2021–2023	Loki	Loki Laufeyson	Lead role, 12 episodes; also executive producer	
2021	CBeebies Bedtime Story	Storyteller	Episode: "Supertato"	
2021	Marvel Studios: Assembled	Himself	2 episodes	
2021	Marvel Studios: Legends	Loki Laufeyson	9 episodes	
2021–2024	What If...?	Loki Laufeyson	Voice, 6 episodes	
2022	The Essex Serpent	Will Ransome	Lead role	
2023	Big Beasts	Narrator	Documentary series	
2024	Earthsounds	Narrator	Documentary series	
2025	Prehistoric Planet: Ice Age	Narrator	Documentary series	
2026	Pompeii: Out of Time	Presenter	Documentary series; also executive producer	

Key
†	Denotes films that have not yet been released

== Theatre ==
Year	Title	Role	Venue	Refs.
1999	Journey's End	Captain Stanhope	Edinburgh Festival Fringe	
2005	Yorgjin Oxo: The Man	Yorgjin Oxo	Theatre503	
2006	The Changeling	Alsemero	Cheek by Jowl / Barbican Centre	
2007	Cymbeline	Posthumus Leonatus & Cloten	Cheek by Jowl / Barbican Centre	
2008	Othello	Cassio	Donmar Warehouse	
2008	Ivanov	Lvov	Donmar Warehouse	
2010	The Children's Monologues	Prudence	Old Vic Theatre	
2012	The Kingdom of Earth	Lot	Criterion Theatre	
2013	Coriolanus	Coriolanus	Donmar Warehouse / National Theatre Live	
2015	Letters Live	Reader	Freemasons' Hall	
2017	Hamlet	Hamlet	Royal Academy of Dramatic Art	
2018	Intelligence Squared: Dickens vs Tolstoy	Reader	Emmanuel Centre	
2018	Dead Poets Live: The Broken Word	Performer	Coronet Theatre	
2019	Betrayal	Robert	Harold Pinter Theatre / Bernard B. Jacobs Theatre	
2021	The Play What I Wrote	Mystery Guest Star	Birmingham Repertory Theatre / Theatre Royal, Bath / Chichester Festival Theatre	
2023	Poetry for Every Day of the Year	Reader	National Theatre	
2025	Much Ado About Nothing	Benedick	Theatre Royal, Drury Lane	
2026–2027	Much Ado About Nothing	Benedick	Winter Garden Theatre	

Key
†	Denotes plays that have not yet premiered

== Radio ==
Year	Title	Role	Notes	Refs.
2002	The Trial of the Angry Brigade	John Barker	BBC Radio 4	
2006	Dracula	Jonathan Harker	BBC World Service	
2006	Another Country	Tommy Judd	BBC Radio 4	
2007	Caesar III: An Empire Without End	Romulus	BBC Radio 4	
2008	Othello	Cassio	BBC Radio 3	
2008	The Leopard	Tancredi	BBC Radio 3	
2008	Cyrano de Bergerac	Christian	BBC Radio 3	
2009	Words and Music: Carnival	Reader	BBC Radio 3	
2015	Words and Music: Memory	Narrator	BBC Radio 3	
2019	Enchanting Poems Alive	Reader	Ximalaya FM	

== Books ==
Year	Title	Role	Notes	Refs.
2007	The Red Necklace	Narrator		
2011	iF Poems	Narrator		
2012	Book of the Dead	Narrator	British Museum Exhibition	
2013	The Love Book	Narrator		
2013	Octopussy and The Living Daylights, and Other Stories	Narrator		
2015	High-Rise	Narrator		
2017	The Dragon Book of Verse	Narrator	Dragon School Edition	
2022	Winnie the Pooh:Tales of Friendship Treasury	Narrator	Calm	

== Discography ==
Year	Song	Artist	Album	Refs.
2014	"The Frigate That Flies"	Tom Hiddleston and cast	The Pirate Fairy (Soundtrack)	
2016	"Hey, Good Lookin'"	Tom Hiddleston and the Saddle Spring Boys	I Saw the Light (Original Motion Picture Soundtrack)	
2016	"Move It on Over"	Tom Hiddleston and the Saddle Spring Boys	I Saw the Light (Original Motion Picture Soundtrack)	
2016	"Jambalaya"	Tom Hiddleston and the Saddle Spring Boys	I Saw the Light (Original Motion Picture Soundtrack)	
2016	"My Bucket's Got a Hole in It"	Tom Hiddleston and the Saddle Spring Boys	I Saw the Light (Original Motion Picture Soundtrack)	
2016	"Why Don't You Love Me"	Tom Hiddleston and the Saddle Spring Boys	I Saw the Light (Original Motion Picture Soundtrack)	
2016	"Honky Tonkin'"	Tom Hiddleston and the Saddle Spring Boys	I Saw the Light (Original Motion Picture Soundtrack)	
2021	"Very Full"	Tom Hiddleston	Loki (Original Series)	

== Video games ==
Year	Title	Voice role	Refs.
2011	Thor: God of Thunder	Loki	

== See also ==
- List of awards and nominations received by Tom Hiddleston
