= Henry VI, Part 2 (The Hollow Crown) =

- The Hollow Crown episode
- Episode no.: Series 2 Episode 2
- Directed by: Dominic Cooke
- Teleplay by: Dominic Cooke; Ben Power
- Based on: Henry VI, Part 2 Henry VI, Part 3 by William Shakespeare
- Original air date: 14 May 2016
- Running time: 123 minutes

Episode chronology
← Previous "Henry VI, Part 1"	Next → "Richard III"

"Henry VI, Part 2" is second episode of the second series of the British television series The Hollow Crown, based on the plays Henry VI, Part 2 and Henry VI, Part 3 by William Shakespeare. It was directed by Dominic Cooke, who also adapted the screenplay with Ben Power. It starred Tom Sturridge as Henry VI, Sophie Okonedo as Queen Margaret and Benedict Cumberbatch as Richard. The adaptation presents Henry VI in two parts, incorporating all three Henry VI plays. It was first broadcast on 14 May 2016 on BBC Two.

== Cast ==
- Benedict Cumberbatch as Richard of Gloucester
- Ben Daniels as Duke of Buckingham
- Adrian Dunbar as Richard Plantagenet, Duke of York
- James Fleet as Baron Hastings
- Phoebe Fox as Lady Anne
- Keeley Hawes as Queen Elizabeth
- Anton Lesser as Duke of Exeter
- Ben Miles as Earl of Somerset
- Sophie Okonedo as Queen Margaret
- Andrew Scott as King Louis XI
- Kyle Soller as Lord Clifford
- Geoffrey Streatfeild as King Edward IV
- Tom Sturridge as King Henry VI
- Stanley Townsend as Earl of Warwick
- Sam Troughton as George Plantagenet
- Jason Watkins as Duke of Suffolk
- Alan David as Bishop of Ely
- Mariah Gale as Lady Bona
- Barney Harris as Prince Edward
- Angus Imrie as Edmund Plantagenet
- Richard Lynch as Earl of Westmorland
- Stuart McQuarrie as Vernon
- Steffan Rhodri as Earl of Oxford
- Lucy Robinson as Cecily Neville, Duchess of York

== Production ==
The concluding cycle of plays were produced in 2015 by the same team that made the first series and were directed by the former artistic director of Royal Court Theatre and Olivier Award winner, Dominic Cooke. They were adapted by Dominic Cooke and Ben Power. The adaptation presents Henry VI in two parts, incorporating all three Henry VI plays.

Executive producer Pippa Harris stated, "The critical and audience reaction to The Hollow Crown series set the bar high for Shakespeare on screen, and Neal Street (Productions) is delighted to be making the concluding part of this great history cycle. By filming the ‘Henry VI’ plays as well as ‘Richard III,’ we will allow viewers to fully appreciate how such a monstrous tyrant could find his way to power, bringing even more weight and depth to this iconic character."

Once again, the production returned to Kent for The Wars of The Roses, filming at Dover Castle, Leeds Castle and Penshurst Place.

== Historical inaccuracies ==
Both Shakespeare's plays and film adaptations based on them contain numerous historical inaccuracies and anachronisms. Furthermore, this adaptation also deviates from the plays. The Jack Cade's rebellion, a major part of Henry VI, Part 2, is omitted; Duke of Suffolk dies in the First Battle of St Albans when historically and in Shakespeare's play he was murdered on a ship; some lines are spoken by other characters or are addressed to characters other than in the play.

Historically, at the time of the First Battle of St. Albans, which took place on May 22, 1455, the sons of Richard of York, Edward and Richard, were 13 and 2 years old, respectively. The son of Henry VI and Margaret of Anjou, Edward of Westminster, was 1 year 7 months old. Richard Neville, 16th Earl of Warwick was seven years younger than Henry VI, at the time of the Battle of St Albans he was 26. Thomas Beaufort, Duke of Exeter could not have witnessed the treaty between Henry VI and Richard of York, because he had died 28 years before. Perhaps Shakespeare was referring to another Duke of Exeter: Henry Holland, a supporter of the Lancastrians.

== Broadcast ==
The second cycle of plays aired on consecutive Saturday evenings on BBC Two commencing Saturday 7 May 2016.

== Home media ==
A Region 2 DVD set of The Wars of the Roses was released on 20 June 2016. A Region 1 DVD set was released on 21 June 2016.

== Soundtrack ==
The original music soundtrack from The Hollow Crown: The Wars of the Roses composed by Dan Jones was released on the Wave Theory Records label in June 2016 and performed by the BBC National Orchestra of Wales
