= Henry VI, Part 1 (The Hollow Crown) =

- The Hollow Crown episode
- Episode no.: Series 2 Episode 1
- Directed by: Dominic Cooke
- Teleplay by: Dominic Cooke; Ben Power
- Based on: Henry VI, Part 1 Henry VI, Part 2 by William Shakespeare
- Original air date: 7 May 2016

Episode chronology
← Previous "Henry V"	Next → "Henry VI, Part 2"

"Henry VI, Part 1" is first episode of the second series of the British television series The Hollow Crown, based on the plays Henry VI, Part 1 and Henry VI, Part 2 by William Shakespeare. The episode was produced by Rupert Ryle-Hodges and directed by Dominic Cooke, who also adapted the screenplay with Ben Power. It starred Tom Sturridge as Henry VI, Sophie Okonedo as Queen Margaret and Adrian Dunbar as Richard of York. The adaptation presents Henry VI in two parts, incorporating all three Henry VI plays. It was first broadcast on 7 May 2016 on BBC Two.

== Cast ==
- Hugh Bonneville as Humphrey, Duke of Gloucester
- Adrian Dunbar as Richard Plantagenet, Duke of York
- Michael Gambon as Sir Edmund Mortimer
- Philip Glenister as Lord Talbot
- Sally Hawkins as Eleanor Cobham, Duchess of Gloucester
- Anton Lesser as Duke of Exeter
- Ben Miles as Earl of Somerset
- Sophie Okonedo as Queen Margaret
- Tom Sturridge as King Henry VI
- Stanley Townsend as Earl of Warwick
- Jason Watkins as Duke of Suffolk
- Samuel West as Bishop of Winchester
- Tom Beard as Sir William Lucy
- Max Bennett as John Talbot
- Tom Byam Shaw as Charles the Dauphin
- Laura Frances-Morgan as Joan of Arc
- Matthew Needham as Basset
- Lucy Robinson as Cecily, Duchess of York
- David Troughton as Duke of Anjou
- Judi Dench as Narrator

== Production ==
The concluding cycle of plays were produced in 2015 by the same team that made the first series and were directed by the former artistic director of Royal Court Theatre and Olivier Award winner, Dominic Cooke. They were adapted by Dominic Cooke and Ben Power. The adaptation presents Henry VI in two parts, incorporating Henry VI, Part 1, Henry VI, Part 2 and Henry VI, Part 3.

Executive producer Pippa Harris stated, "The critical and audience reaction to The Hollow Crown series set the bar high for Shakespeare on screen, and Neal Street (Productions) is delighted to be making the concluding part of this great history cycle. By filming the 'Henry VI' plays as well as 'Richard III', we will allow viewers to fully appreciate how such a monstrous tyrant could find his way to power, bringing even more weight and depth to this iconic character."

Once again, the production returned to Kent for The Wars of The Roses, filming at Dover Castle, Leeds Castle and Penshurst Place.

== Historical inaccuracies ==
Both Shakespeare's plays and film adaptations based on them contain numerous historical inaccuracies and anachronisms. Furthermore, this adaptation also deviates from the plays. For example, the film omits the character of the Duke of Bedford, uncle of Henry VI and regent of France; in the film the marriage of Margaret of Anjou and Henry VI is arranged by the Earl of Somerset, instead of the Earl of Suffolk, as in Shakespeare's play and as it really happened; some lines are given to other characters or are addressed to characters other than in the play.

The film, like the play, features Edmund Mortimer, 5th Earl of March. In fact, following Holinshed, Shakespeare conflated two persons in the character of "Edmund Mortimer, Earl of March": Edmund Mortimer, 5th Earl of March and his uncle Edmund Mortimer, son-in-law of Owain Glyndŵr. Neither of the two Edmund Mortimers died a decrepit old man imprisoned in the Tower of London, as depicted by Shakespeare and shown in the film.

== Broadcast ==
The second cycle of plays aired on consecutive Saturday evenings on BBC Two commencing Saturday 7 May 2016.

== Home media ==
A Region 2 DVD set of The Wars of the Roses was released on 20 June 2016. A Region 1 DVD set was released on 21 June 2016.

== Soundtrack ==
The original music soundtrack from The Hollow Crown: The Wars of the Roses composed by Dan Jones was released on the Wave Theory Records label in June 2016 and performed by the BBC National Orchestra of Wales
