= List of awards and nominations received by Tom Hiddleston =

Tom Hiddleston awards and nominations
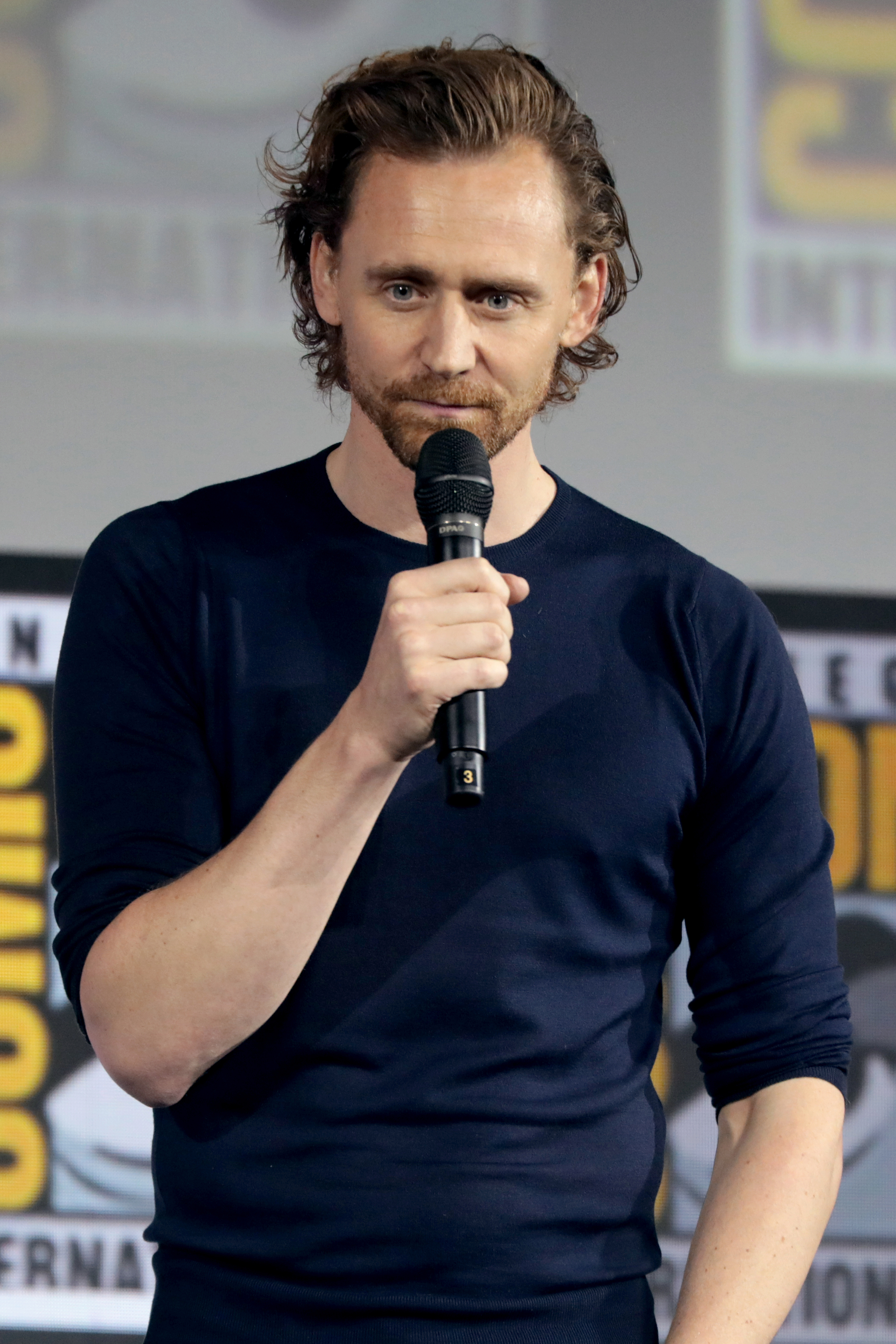
- Hiddleston at the 2019 San Diego Comic-Con
Awards and nominations
Award	Wins	Nominations
British Academy Film Awards	0	1
Golden Globe Awards	1	2
Laurence Olivier Awards	1	4
Primetime Emmy Awards	0	2
Tony Awards	0	1

Totals (Note: Certain award groups do not simply award one winner. They acknowledge several different recipients, have runners-up, and have third place. Since this is a specific recognition and is different from losing an award, runner-up mentions are considered wins in this award tally. For simplification and to avoid errors, each award in this list has been presumed to have had a prior nomination.)
- Wins: 35
- Nominations: 97

Tom Hiddleston is an English actor of the stage and screen. He is known well for his performances in film, television and theatre. In 2012, he received a BAFTA Rising Star Award nomination. He has received two Primetime Emmy Award nominations and two Golden Globe Award nominations for producing and acting in the AMC limited series The Night Manager (2016), winning the Golden Globe Award for Best Actor – Miniseries or Television Film.

He has also received awards for his work on the London stage, earning three Laurence Olivier Award nominations winning Best Newcomer in a Play for his performance as Posthumus Leonatus & Cloten in William Shakespeare play Cymbeline in 2008. In 2020, he was nominated for his Broadway debut for Best Actor in a Play for his performance as Robert in the revival of Harold Pinter's Betrayal.

== Major associations ==
=== British Academy Film Awards ===
Year	Category	Result	Ref.
2012	BAFTA Rising Star Award	Nominated	

=== Golden Globe Awards ===
Year	Category	Nominated work	Result	Ref.
2016	Best Miniseries or Television Film	The Night Manager	Nominated	
2016	Best Actor – Miniseries or Television Film	The Night Manager	Won	

=== Laurence Olivier Awards ===
Year	Category	Nominated work	Result	Ref.
2008	Best Newcomer in a Play	Cymbeline	Won	
2008	Best Newcomer in a Play	Othello	Nominated	
2014	Best Actor	Coriolanus	Nominated	
2026	Best Actor	Much Ado About Nothing	Nominated	

=== Primetime Emmy Awards ===
Year	Category	Nominated work	Result	Ref.
2016	Outstanding Limited Series	The Night Manager	Nominated	
2016	Outstanding Lead Actor in a Limited Series or Movie	The Night Manager	Nominated	

=== Tony Awards ===
Year	Category	Nominated work	Result	Ref.
2020	Best Performance by a Leading Actor in a Play	Betrayal	Nominated	

== Miscellaneous awards ==
Year	Award	Work	Result	Ref.
2006	Ian Charleson Award (Received commendation)	The Changeling	Nominated	
2007	Ian Charleson Award Third Prize	Othello	Won	
2009	Theatregoers' Choice Award for Best Supporting Actor in a Play	Othello/Ivanov	Won	
2009	Ian Charleson Award (Special commendation as previous winner)	Ivanov	Nominated	
2010	Crime Thriller Award for Best Supporting Actor	Wallander	Nominated	
2010	Online Film & Television Association Awards for Best Actor in a Motion Picture or Miniseries	Cranford	Nominated	
2011	Alliance of Women Film Journalists Award for Best Ensemble Cast	Midnight in Paris	Nominated	
2011	Phoenix Film Critics Society Award for Best Ensemble Acting	Midnight in Paris	Nominated	
2011	Scream Award for Breakout Performance – Male	Thor	Nominated	
2011	My Cinema Awards for Best Supporting Actor in a Drama, Action or Horror	Thor	Nominated	
2011	Georgia Film Critics Association for Breakthrough Award	Midnight in Paris, Thor, War Horse	Nominated	
2012	Empire Award for Best Male Newcomer	Thor	Won	
2012	Evening Standard British Film Award for Best Actor	Archipelago	Nominated	
2012	Saturn Award for Best Supporting Actor	Thor	Nominated	
2012	Gold Derby Film Award for Ensemble Cast	Midnight in Paris	Nominated	
2012	SAG Awards for Best Ensemble Acting	Midnight in Paris	Nominated	
2012	Teen Choice Award for Choice Movie Villain	The Avengers	Nominated	
2012	Glamour Award for Man of the Year	—N/a	Won	
2012	Richard Attenborough Regional Film Award for British Rising Star	—N/a	Won	
2013	South Bank Sky Arts Award - Times Breakthrough Award	The Hollow Crown, War Horse, The Avengers	Won	
2013	Kids' Choice Award for Favorite Villain	The Avengers	Nominated	
2013	MTV Movie Award for Best Fight	The Avengers	Won	
2013	MTV Movie Award for Best Villain	The Avengers	Won	
2014	Online Film & Television Association Awards for Best Actor in a Motion Picture or Miniseries	The Hollow Crown	Nominated	
2014	Russian National Movie Award - Georges award for Best Foreign Villan	Thor: The Dark World	Won	
2014	Russian National Movie Award - Georges award for Best Foreign Duo	Thor: The Dark World	Nominated	
2014	Empire Award for Best Supporting Actor	Thor: The Dark World	Nominated	
2014	Saturn Award for Best Supporting Actor	Thor: The Dark World	Nominated	
2014	MTV Movie Award for Favourite Character	Thor: The Dark World	Nominated	
2014	ELLE Style Awards for Man Of The Year	—N/a	Won	
2014	GLAMOUR Best Dressed Man of the year	—N/a	Won	
2014	Evening Standard Theatre Award for Best Actor	Coriolanus	Won	
2015	WhatsOnStage.com Award for Best Actor in a Play	Coriolanus	Nominated	
2015	Behind the Voice Actors Awards for Best Vocal Ensemble	Tinker Bell and the Pirate Fairy	Nominated	
2015	CinEuphoria Award for Best Duo	Only Lovers Left Alive (shared with Tilda Swinton)	Nominated	
2015	Alliance of Women Film Journalists for Best Depiction of Nudity, Sexuality or Seduction	Only Lovers Left Alive (shared with Tilda Swinton)	Nominated	
2015	BloodGuts UK Horror Award for Best Actor	Only Lovers Left Alive	Nominated	
2015	Chlotrudis Award for Best Supporting Actor	Unrelated	Nominated	
2015	British Independent Film Award for Best Actor	High-Rise	Nominated	
2015	Evening Standard British Film Award for Best Actor	High-Rise; Crimson Peak	Nominated	
2016	Fangoria Chainsaw Award for Best Actor	Crimson Peak	Runner-up	
2016	Rear of the Year	—N/a	Won	
2016	TV Choice Award for Best Actor	The Night Manager	Won	
2016	I Talk Telly Award for Best Actor in a Drama	The Night Manager	Won	
2016	Gold Derby TV Award for TV Movie/Mini Lead Actor	The Night Manager	Nominated	
2016	Critics' Choice Award for Best Actor in a Movie/Miniseries	The Night Manager	Nominated	
2016	Satellite Award for Best Actor – Miniseries or Television Film	The Night Manager	Nominated	
2016	TVTimes Award for Favourite Actor	The Night Manager	Nominated	
2016	Online Film & Television Association Awards for Best Actor in a Motion Picture or Limited Series	The Night Manager	Nominated	
2017	National Television Award for Favourite Drama Performance	The Night Manager	Nominated	
2017	Producers Guild of America David L. Wolper Award – Outstanding Producer of Long-Form Television	The Night Manager	Nominated	
2017	Empire Hero Award	—N/a	Won	
2017	GQ Most Stylish Man of the Year	—N/a	Won	
2017	Teen Choice Award for Choice Movie Actor – Sci-Fi/Fantasy	Kong: Skull Island	Nominated	
2018	Teen Choice Award for Choice Movie Scene Stealer	Thor: Ragnarok	Nominated	
2018	Indiana Film Journalists Association for Best Vocal/ Motion Capture Performance	Early Man	Nominated	
2019	BroadwayWorld UK Awards for Best Actor in a New Production of a Play	Betrayal	Won	
2019	Evening Standard Theatre Award for Best Actor	Betrayal	Nominated	
2020	WhatsonStage Award for Best Actor in a Play	Betrayal	Nominated	
2020	Drama League Award for Distinguished Performance	Betrayal	Nominated	
2020	Outer Critics Circle Award for Outstanding Actor in a Play	Betrayal	Honoree	
2020	BroadwayWorld Theatre Fans' Choice Awards - Best Leading Performer In A Play Of The Decade	Betrayal	Won	
2021	Digital Spy Reader Award for Best Actor	Loki	Nominated	
2021	People's Choice Award for The Male TV Star of 2021	Loki	Won	
2021	ComicBook.com Golden Issue Award for Best TV Actor	Loki	Won	
2022	Nickelodeon Kids' Choice Award for Favorite Favorite Male TV Star (Family)	Loki	Won	
2022	Critics' Choice Super Award for Best Actor in a Superhero Series	Loki	Won	
2022	MTV Movie & TV Award for Best Team	Loki	Won	
2022	Online Film & Television Association Awards for Best Actor in Drama Series	Loki	Nominated	
2022	Hollywood Critics Association TV Awards for Best Actor in a Streaming Series, Drama	Loki	Nominated	
2022	Saturn Award for Best Actor in a Streaming Television Series	Loki	Nominated	
2024	Critics' Choice Television Award for Best Actor in a Drama Series	Loki	Nominated	
2024	People's Choice Award for The Male TV Star of the Year	Loki	Nominated	
2024	Critics' Choice Super Award for Best Actor in a Superhero Series	Loki	Nominated	
2024	Nickelodeon Kids' Choice Award for Favorite Favorite Male TV Star (Family)	Loki	Nominated	
2024	Astra TV Awards for Best Actor in a Streaming Drama Series	Loki	Nominated	
2024	Variety Virtuoso Award	Career Achievement	Won	
2025	London ICONS of the Year for Film and Theatre	—N/a	Won	
2025	London ICONS for Londoner of the Year	—N/a	Won	
2025	GQ Men of the Year Awards	Risk-taking leading man	Honoree	
2026	Indiana Film Journalists Association Award for Best Ensemble Acting	The Life of Chuck	Nominated	
2026	Iowa Film Critics Association Award for Best Actor	The Life of Chuck	Won	
2026	Saturn Award for Best Actor	The Life of Chuck	Nominated	
2026	WhatsOnStage Award for The SINE Digital Best Performer in a Play	Much Ado About Nothing	Nominated	
2026	The Standard Theatre Awards for Best Actor	Much Ado About Nothing	Nominated	
2026	Critics’ Circle Theatre Awards for Best for Best Shakespearean Performance	Much Ado About Nothing	Nominated	
2026	Zurich Film Festival Golden Eye	Tenzing	Won	
2026	Esquire Better Men Honours	—N/a	Honoree	

== See also ==
- List of Tom Hiddleston performances
