= Richard III (The Hollow Crown) =

- The Hollow Crown episode
- Episode no.: Series 2 Episode 3
- Directed by: Dominic Cooke
- Teleplay by: Dominic Cooke; Ben Power
- Based on: Richard III by William Shakespeare
- Original air date: 21 May 2016
- Running time: 130 minutes

Episode chronology
← Previous "Henry VI, Part 2"	Next → —

"Richard III" is third episode of the second series of the British television series The Hollow Crown, based on the play of the same name by William Shakespeare. It was directed by Dominic Cooke, who also adapted the screenplay with Ben Power. It starred Benedict Cumberbatch as Richard III, Sophie Okonedo as Queen Margaret, Keeley Hawes as Queen Elizabeth, and Judi Dench as Cecily. It was first broadcast on 21 May 2016 on BBC Two.

== Cast ==
- Benedict Cumberbatch as Richard III of England
- Ben Daniels as Duke of Buckingham
- Judi Dench as Cecily, Duchess of York
- James Fleet as Lord Hastings
- Phoebe Fox as Queen Anne
- Keeley Hawes as Queen Elizabeth
- Sophie Okonedo as Queen Margaret
- Geoffrey Streatfeild as King Edward IV of England
- Luke Treadaway as King Henry VII of England
- Sam Troughton as George Plantagenet, Duke of Clarence
- Josef Altin as Murderer
- Isaac Andrews as Prince Richard, Duke of York
- Paul Bazely as Catesby
- Geoff Bell as Murderer
- Robert Bowman as Mayor of London
- Alan David as Bishop of Ely
- Keith Dunphy as Ratcliffe
- Simon Ginty as George Stanley
- Ivanno Jeremiah as Blunt
- Madison Lygo as Princess Elizabeth, marries Henry VII
- John MacKay as Brackenbury
- Caspar Morley as Prince Edward
- Gary Powell as Tyrell
- Penny Ryder as Lady-in-Waiting
- Jo Stone-Fewings as Lord Stanley
- Samuel Valentine as Lord Grey
- Al Weaver as Lord Rivers

== Production ==
The concluding cycle of plays were produced in 2015 by the same team that made the first series and were directed by the former artistic director of Royal Court Theatre and Olivier Award winner, Dominic Cooke. They were adapted by Dominic Cooke and Ben Power.

Executive producer Pippa Harris stated, "The critical and audience reaction to The Hollow Crown series set the bar high for Shakespeare on screen, and Neal Street (Productions) is delighted to be making the concluding part of this great history cycle. By filming the 'Henry VI' plays as well as 'Richard III,’ we will allow viewers to fully appreciate how such a monstrous tyrant could find his way to power, bringing even more weight and depth to this iconic character."

Once again, the production returned to Kent for The Wars of The Roses, filming at Dover Castle, Leeds Castle and Penshurst Place.

== Broadcast ==
The second cycle of plays aired on consecutive Saturday evenings on BBC Two commencing Saturday 7 May 2016.

== Home media ==
A Region 2 DVD set of The Wars of the Roses was released on 20 June 2016. A Region 1 DVD set was released on 21 June 2016.

== Soundtrack ==
The original music soundtrack from The Hollow Crown: The Wars of the Roses composed by Dan Jones was released on the Wave Theory Records label in June 2016 and performed by the BBC National Orchestra of Wales
