= Richard II (The Hollow Crown) =

- The Hollow Crown episode
- Episode no.: Series 1 Episode 1
- Directed by: Rupert Goold
- Teleplay by: Rupert Goold; Ben Power
- Based on: Richard II by William Shakespeare
- Cinematography by: Danny Cohen
- Editing by: Trevor Waite
- Original air date: 30 June 2012
- Running time: 148 minutes

Episode chronology
← Previous —	Next → "Henry IV, Part I"

"Richard II" is the first episode of the first series of the British television series The Hollow Crown, based on William Shakespeare's play of the same name. "Richard II" was directed by Rupert Goold, who adapted the screenplay with Ben Power. Ben Whishaw stars as the titular Richard II of England. It was first broadcast on 30 June 2012 on BBC Two.

Whishaw's performance earned him the 2013 British Academy Television Award (BAFTA) for Leading Actor. The programme was also nominated for the Best Single Drama award.

== Cast ==
- Ben Whishaw as Richard II of England
- Rory Kinnear as Henry Bolingbroke
- Patrick Stewart as John of Gaunt, Duke of Lancaster
- David Suchet as Edmund of Langley, Duke of York
- David Morrissey as Henry Percy, Earl of Northumberland
- Tom Hughes as Aumerle
- James Purefoy as Thomas de Mowbray, Duke of Norfolk
- Clémence Poésy as the Queen (a combination of Isabella of Valois and Anne of Bohemia)
- Lindsay Duncan as the Duchess of York
- Ferdinand Kingsley as Bushy
- Samuel Roukin as Bagot
- Harry Hadden-Paton as Green
- Tom Goodman-Hill as Sir Stephen Scroop
- Adrian Schiller as Lord Willoughby
- Peter de Jersey as Lord Ross
- Finbar Lynch as Lord Marshall
- Lucian Msamati as the Bishop of Carlisle
- Richard Bremmer as the Abbot of Westminster
- Rhodri Miles as the Welsh Captain
- David Bradley as the Gardener
- Simon Trinder as the Gardener's Assistant
- Isabella Laughland as the Queen's Lady
- Daniel Boyd as the Groom

== Production ==
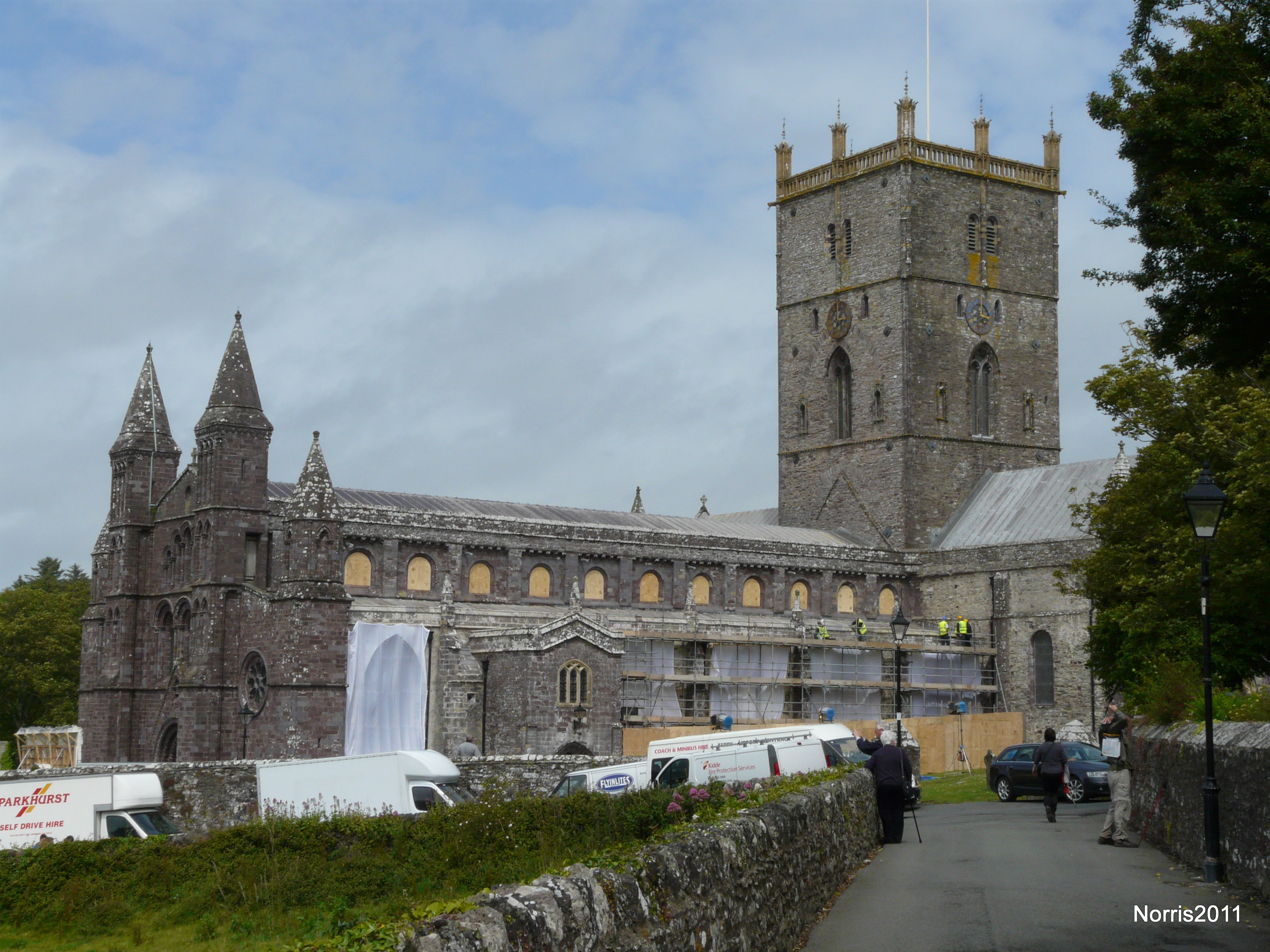
St David's Cathedral during the filming of "Richard II" in June 2011

The BBC scheduled the screening of Shakespeare's history plays as part of 2012's Cultural Olympiad, a celebration of British culture coinciding with the 2012 Summer Olympics. Sam Mendes signed up as executive producer to adapt all four of Shakespeare's tetralogy (Richard II, Henry IV, Part 1, Henry IV, Part 2 and Henry V) in September 2010. He is joined as executive producer by Pippa Harris (both representing Neal Street Productions), Gareth Neame (NBCUniversal), and Ben Stephenson (BBC).

"Richard II" was shot entirely on location, including at St David's Cathedral, Pembroke Castle and Packwood House. It completed filming in July 2011. One of the characters in Richard II, the Duchess of Gloucester, is absent from this adaptation. Additionally, the characters of Sir Piers Exton and the Duke of Aumerle are combined; after being pardoned for conspiring against Henry IV, Aumerle takes part in the assassination of Richard and presents his body to the king.
