= Henry V (The Hollow Crown) =

- The Hollow Crown episode
- Episode no.: Series 1 Episode 4
- Directed by: Thea Sharrock
- Teleplay by: Ben Power; Thea Sharrock
- Based on: Henry V by William Shakespeare
- Cinematography by: Michael McDonough
- Editing by: John Wilson
- Original air date: 21 July 2012
- Running time: 139 minutes

Episode chronology
← Previous "Henry IV, Part II"	Next → "Henry VI, Part I"

"Henry V" is the fourth episode of the first series of the British television series The Hollow Crown, based on the play of the same name by William Shakespeare. The episode was produced by Rupert Ryle-Hodges, directed by Thea Sharrock and starred Tom Hiddleston as Henry V of England. It was first broadcast on 21 July 2012 on BBC Two.

Henry V is the fourth play in Shakespeare's tetralogy dealing with the successive reigns of Richard II, Henry IV, and Henry V.

== Plot changes ==
The episode starts with the funeral of Henry V (which is the start of Henry VI, part 1) over whose obsequies the opening speech from the Chorus is made. After that, the movie begins to speak about Henry V.

Certain scenes from Shakespeare's play are omitted:

- The Southampton Plot and Henry's merciless response.
- The scenes among the ordinary men at the Siege of Harfleur, featuring Fluellen, MacMorris and Jamy.
- The conversations in the French camp on the evening before the battle.
- The slaughter of the young boys guarding the English baggage train at Agincourt.

== Cast ==
- Tom Hiddleston as King Henry V
- Julie Walters as Mistress Nell Quickly
- John Hurt as the Chorus
- Geraldine Chaplin as Alice
- Paul Freeman as Sir Thomas Erpingham
- Tom Georgeson as Bardolph
- Richard Griffiths as Duke of Burgundy
- Paterson Joseph as Edward, Duke of York
- James Laurenson as Earl of Westmorland
- Anton Lesser as Duke of Exeter
- Paul Ritter as Ancient Pistol
- Malcolm Sinclair as Archbishop of Canterbury
- Owen Teale as Captain Fluellen
- Mélanie Thierry as Princess Catherine
- Lambert Wilson as King Charles VI of France
- Edward Akrout as Louis, the Dauphin
- Tom Brooke as Corporal Nym
- Jeremie Covillaut as Montjoy
- Maxime Lefrançois as The Constable of France
- Stanley Weber as Duke of Orleans
- John Dagleish as John Bates
- Gwilym Lee as Williams
- Richard Clothier as Earl of Salisbury
- Nigel Cooke as Bishop of Ely
- George Sargeant as Falstaff's boy
- Simon Russell Beale as Sir John Falstaff (cameo)

== Filming Locations ==
Baron's Hall in Penshurst Place was used as the setting for the French Palace and Squerryes Court doubled as the French battle court field.
