= The Spaceship =

British radio comedy (2005)

- Genre: Radio comedy Radio drama
- Country of origin: United Kingdom
- Language: English
- Home station: BBC Radio 7
- Starring: James Fleet; Emily Joyce; Rosie Cavaliero; Paul Barnhill; Neil Warhurst; Nick Bolton
- Written by: Paul Barnhill; Neil Warhurst
- Directed by: Sally Avens
- Original release: June 2005

The Spaceship is a science fiction comedy set in the year 2104 and onwards that premiered on BBC Radio 7 over the course of five days during the last week of June 2005. It was written by Paul Barnhill and Neil Warhurst and was directed by Sally Avens.

A second series of The Spaceship began broadcasting on 25 February 2008, with the first series repeated again in the week prior to broadcast.

In the year 2104 a fleet of research cruisers were launched into space. Their mission: to seek out new life. With every moment on board preserved by wall-to-wall monitoring and transmitted over time back to Earth, we’ve been allowed access to one of these ships: The Really Invincible III, Macclesfield Division. What you are about to hear took place, live, four years ago, seventy thousand light years from home.

== Characters ==
- Captain Gordon "Flashdance" Taylor (James Fleet) – Gordon is captain of The Really Invincible III and has a tendency to throw cheese and wine parties at a moments notice.
- Melissa Paterson (Emily Joyce) – Despite being the ship's security officer, Melissa never wears the regulation uniform.
- Karen Trex (Rosie Cavaliero) – Ship's Communications Officer, Feng Shui expert, and all-round nice person.
- Stuart Jackson (Paul Barnhill) – Stuart is the ship's engineer and newest member after the last engineer was accidentally ejected into space.
- Clive 55 (Neil Warhurst) – As one of 137 clones, all called Clive, created in a lab just outside Warrington, he is the ship's Chief Medical Scientist.
- Narrator (Nick Bolton) – Guide to events on board The Really Invincible III.
- E3007 Series II Yakamoto – The ship's robot that has been malfunctioning since launch and is locked in a perpetual loop of swing music. Its only current use is that of an iron for the crew's clothes.

== Episode guide ==
=== The Spaceship ===
- Episode 3002: Lost – The crew is responsible for taking care of the princess of the Urg.
- Episode 3003: Indestructible – Why does The Indestructible III explode for no reason?
- Episode 3004: Monster – Who or what is in the hold of The Really Invincible III.
- Episode 3005: Dirty – Clive 55’s experiment with dark matter goes awry.
- Episode 3205: Enemies – The crew prepare to meet the Duhwop-eye.

=== The Spaceship II (Second Series) ===
- Episode 1: Hole – While dealing with the unpleasant consequences of the first ever incident of travel through a black hole, the crew faces a race of call-centre operative plants.
- Episode 2: Manhood – Scientist Clive 55 reconstructs a dead space pirate and before long he's running the ship.
- Episode 3: Rude – The crew have some space tourists on board, but it turns into a holiday from hell.
- Episode 4: Sick – The crew contract a mystery virus which makes them age at an alarming rate.
- Episode 5: The End – The End: The crew find themselves at the end of the universe.
