= Tom Hiddleston =

British actor (born 1981)

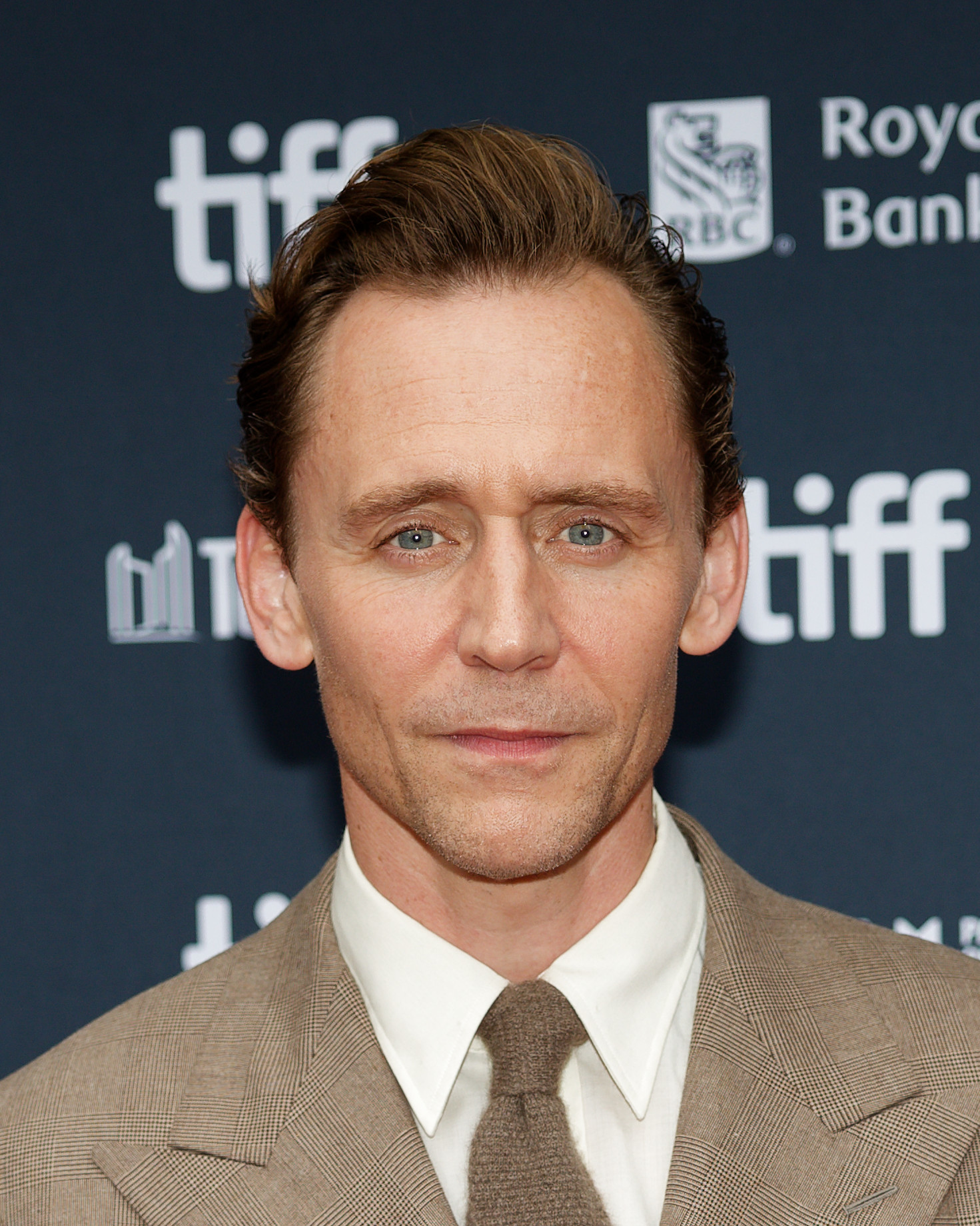
- Hiddleston at the 2024 Toronto International Film Festival
- Born: Thomas William Hiddleston; 9 February 1981 (age 45); London, England
- Education: Pembroke College, Cambridge (BA); Royal Academy of Dramatic Art (BA)
- Occupation: Actor
- Years active: 2001–present
- Works: Full list
- Partner: Zawe Ashton
- Children: 2
- Awards: Full list

Thomas William Hiddleston (born 9 February 1981) is a British actor. His accolades include a Golden Globe Award as well as two Primetime Emmy Award nominations.

Hiddleston started his film career with Joanna Hogg's Unrelated (2007) and Archipelago (2010). In 2011, Hiddleston portrayed F. Scott Fitzgerald in Woody Allen's romantic comedy Midnight in Paris, appeared in Steven Spielberg's War Horse, and was nominated for the BAFTA Rising Star Award. That year, he achieved global stardom portraying Loki in the Marvel Cinematic Universe (MCU) superhero film Thor, and reprised the role in six subsequent films, as well as the Disney+ series Loki (2021–2023). He continued working with auteurs in independent films, including Terence Davies's drama The Deep Blue Sea (2012), Jim Jarmusch's vampire film Only Lovers Left Alive (2013) and Guillermo del Toro's horror film Crimson Peak (2015). He also played the troubled country music singer Hank Williams in the biopic I Saw The Light (2015) and led the big-budget adventure Kong: Skull Island (2017). On television, Hiddleston is starring in and executive producing the BBC One series The Night Manager (2016–2026), for which he received two Primetime Emmy Award nominations, and won a Golden Globe Award for Best Actor. He starred in The Life of Chuck, an adaptation of Stephen King's novella of the same name.

Hiddleston made his stage debut in Journey's End in 1999. He continued acting in theatre, including in the West End productions of Cymbeline (2007) and Ivanov (2008). He won the Laurence Olivier Award for Best Newcomer in a Play for his role in Cymbeline and was nominated for the same award for his role as Cassio in Othello (2008). Hiddleston starred as the title character in a production of Coriolanus (2013–2014), receiving a nomination for the Laurence Olivier Award for Best Actor. He made his Broadway debut in a 2019 revival of Harold Pinter's drama Betrayal, for which he was nominated for the Tony Award for Best Actor in a Play.

== Early life and education ==
Thomas William Hiddleston was born on 9 February 1981 in the Westminster district of London to Diana Patricia (née Servaes) Hiddleston, an arts administrator and former stage manager from Suffolk in east England, and Dr. James Norman Hiddleston, from Greenock in Renfrewshire in the west of Scotland, a physical chemist and former managing director of a biotechnology company that liaised with Oxford University. Hiddleston has an older sister, Sarah Alexandra Hiddleston, who works as a journalist in Chennai, Tamil Nadu, India, and a younger sister, Emma Elizabeth (née Hiddleston) Blakiston-Houston, who is an actress and midwife.

On his mother's side, Hiddleston is a great-grandson of Vice-Admiral Reginald Servaes and a great-great-grandson of food producer Edmund Vestey, 1st Baronet. Through Vestey, Hiddleston is a distant cousin of Geoffrey Clifton-Brown, who is a great-grandson of Edmund Vestey. Hiddleston's paternal grandfather, Alexander, served in the Royal Artillery and worked as a plater in the shipyards. He shares the same name as his great-great-uncle, Tom Hiddleston, a shipyard plater from Greenock and a member of the Royal Artillery's 51st (Highland) Division, who died after the Battle of the Somme and whose name is engraved in the Broomhill war memorial.

Hiddleston was raised in Wimbledon, London in his early years, and later moved to a village near Oxford. He was privately educated at Windlesham House School for a year at age seven. In 1989, Hiddleston moved to the Dragon School in Oxford where he studied until 1994, the school has since named a classroom 'The Hiddleston Room' in their Skipper’s centre for music and performing arts in his honour. His parents divorced when he was twelve. At age thirteen, Hiddleston started boarding at Eton College, where he also studied A-level Latin, Greek and English Literature. Subsequently he studied Classics at the University of Cambridge where he was an undergraduate student at Pembroke College, Cambridge, and was awarded a double first honours degree. Mary Beard was one of his supervisors. During his second term at Cambridge, he was seen in a production of A Streetcar Named Desire by talent agent Lorraine Hamilton of Hamilton Hodell. In 2005, he graduated from the Royal Academy of Dramatic Art with a Bachelor of Arts honours degree in acting.

== Career ==
=== Early work (2001–2010) ===
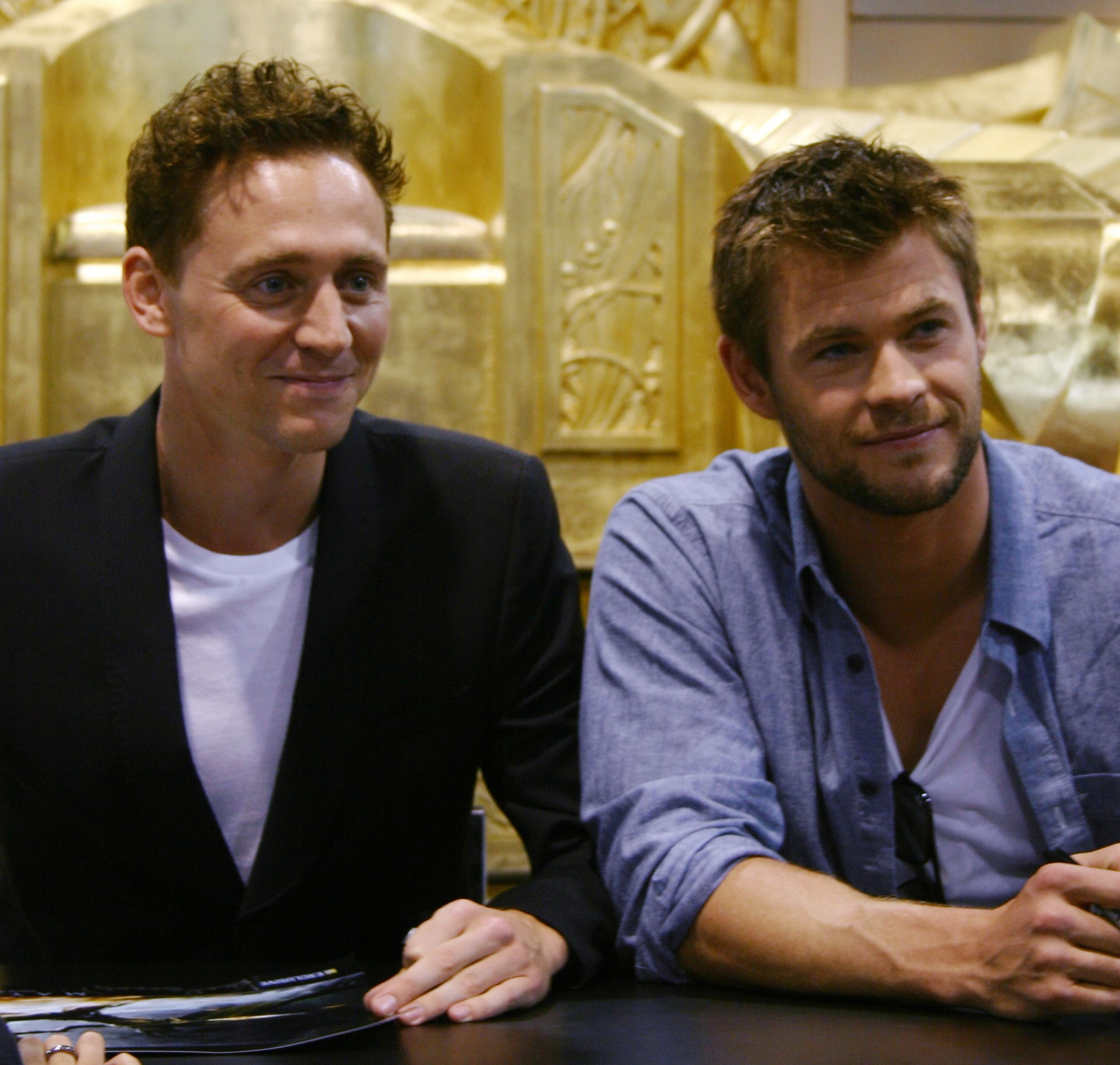
Hiddleston with Chris Hemsworth at the 2010 San Diego Comic-Con

While still doing student plays, Hiddleston began appearing on television, landing parts in Stephen Whittaker's adaptation of Nicholas Nickleby (2001) for ITV, the BBC/HBO co-production Conspiracy (2001), and as Randolph Churchill, the son of Winston Churchill, in the BBC/HBO drama The Gathering Storm (2002).

Upon graduating from RADA, Hiddleston was cast in his first film role, playing Oakley in Joanna Hogg's first feature film, Unrelated (2006). His sister Emma also appeared in the film as Badge. Casting director Lucy Bevan, who cast him in the film, said "there was just a fantastic confidence about him". Hiddleston had leading roles in Declan Donnellan's company Cheek by Jowl's productions of Thomas Middleton's The Changeling (2006) and Shakespeare's Cymbeline (2007). For the latter he won the Laurence Olivier Award for Best Newcomer in a Play. His Donmar Warehouse credits include Cassio in Michael Grandage's production of Othello (2008) alongside Chiwetel Ejiofor and Ewan McGregor. He also played Lvov in the West End revival of Chekhov's Ivanov (2008) with Kenneth Branagh.

Hiddleston voiced Charles Darwin in BBC's documentary Galápagos in 2006. He narrated the audiobook The Red Necklace by Sally Gardner in 2007. Hiddleston played the leading role of Edward in Hogg's second feature, Archipelago (2010). Martin Scorsese spoke about his experience watching Archipelago: "I couldn't stop watching it... I fell in love with it". Hiddleston's TV credits include Magnus Martinsson in the BBC detective drama Wallander (2008), Bill Hazledine in Suburban Shootout (2006), John Plumptre in the BBC costume drama TV film Miss Austen Regrets (2008), and William Buxton in the BBC drama series Return to Cranford (2009). In 2007, he joined a list of British actors, including Kate Winslet and Orlando Bloom, to have guest starred in the long-running medical drama Casualty.

=== Breakthrough and worldwide recognition (2011–2014) ===
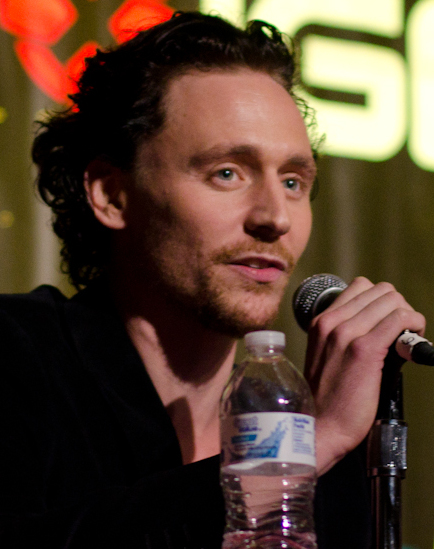
Hiddleston at the 2011 New York Comic Con

Hiddleston is well known for his portrayal of Loki in the 2011 Marvel Studios film Thor. He was invited to audition by Kenneth Branagh, the film's director, after having previously worked with Branagh on Ivanov and Wallander. Hiddleston said of Branagh, "Ken has had a life-changing effect. He was able to say to the executives, 'Trust me on this, you can cast Tom and he will deliver'. It was massive and it's completely changed the course of what is available to me to do. Ken gave me my break." He originally auditioned for the role of Thor, recalling, "That was what I was being considered for, because I'm tall and blonde and classically trained, and that seemed to be the mold for what Thor was, he was to be a classical character. And it was in my auditions. I owe this entirely to Marvel and their open-mindedness, they saw something that they thought was interesting. They saw some temperament that they liked." Hiddleston was given six weeks to bulk up, so he went on a strict diet and gained twenty pounds of muscle. Branagh ultimately decided he was more suitable as the antagonist and cast him as Loki. Empire magazine ranked Hiddleston's portrayal of Loki as the 19th Greatest Movie Character of All Time.

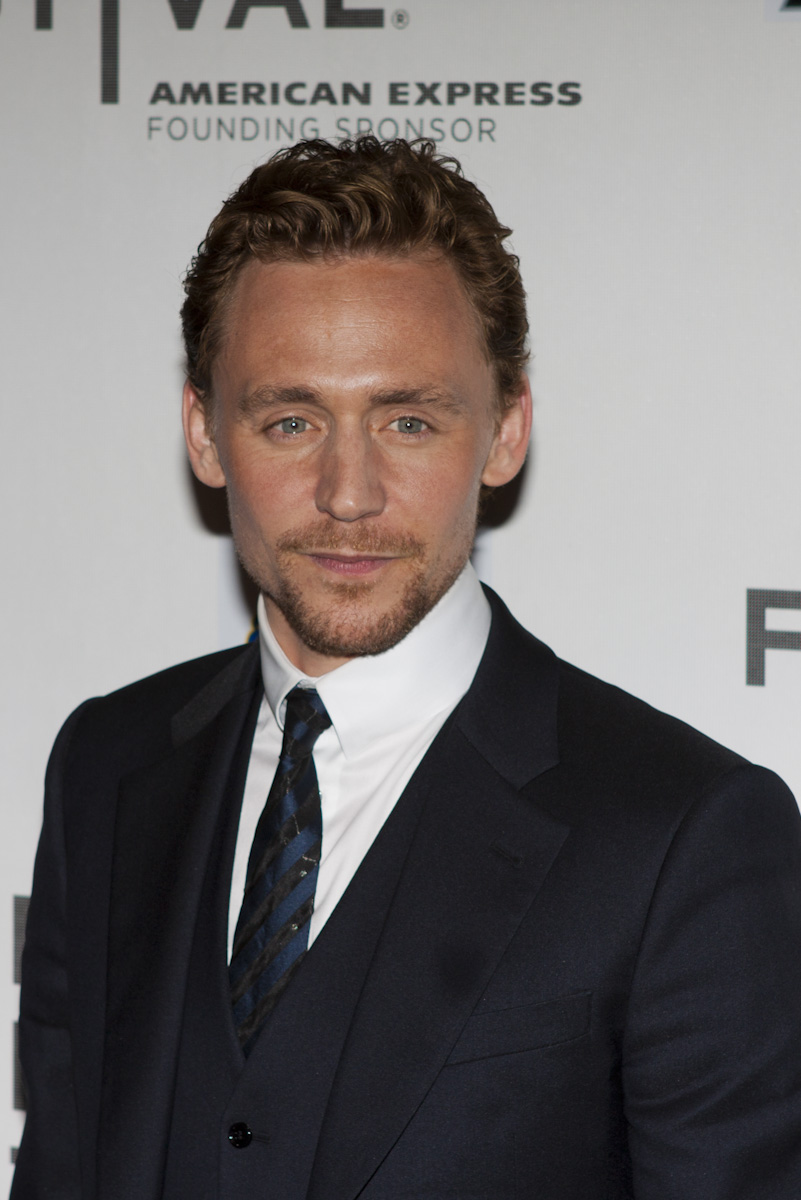
Hiddleston at the 2012 Tribeca Film Festival

In November 2010, Hiddleston appeared with Benedict Cumberbatch, Gemma Arterton, Eddie Redmayne and Rose Byrne among others in Danny Boyle's production of The Children's Monologues, in which he played Prudence, a young girl upset with her mother for her father leaving and excited for her birthday. The play was a one time event of adapted stories of children's first-hand experiences in South Africa being re-interpreted by and performed by various actors.

In 2011, Hiddleston portrayed novelist F. Scott Fitzgerald in Woody Allen's Midnight in Paris and the noble Captain Nicholls in Steven Spielberg's War Horse, based on the 1982 novel by Michael Morpurgo. The same year he starred as Freddie Page, a RAF pilot in the drama The Deep Blue Sea, alongside Rachel Weisz. In 2012, he reprised his role as Loki in The Avengers. Hiddleston provided the voiceover the Ancient Egyptian Book of the Dead in 2011 and poetry for iF Poems and The Love Book on iTunes in 2012.

On television in 2012, Hiddleston appeared in the BBC Two series The Hollow Crown, portraying Prince Hal opposite Jeremy Irons as Henry IV in the adaptation of Shakespeare's Henry IV, Part I and Part II. He later appeared as King Henry V in the television film Henry V. In 2013, Hiddleston played Loki again in Thor: The Dark World, after which he played a vampire in Jim Jarmusch's film Only Lovers Left Alive with Tilda Swinton and Mia Wasikowska.

From December 2013 to February 2014, Hiddleston played the title character in Shakespeare's Coriolanus at the Donmar Warehouse in Covent Garden directed by Josie Rourke. It was also aired live internationally on 30 January 2014. David Benedict of Variety praised a "scorching" performance. He had a cameo in the 2014 film Muppets Most Wanted, as the Great Escapo.

=== Varied roles and expansion (2015–present) ===
Hiddleston replaced Benedict Cumberbatch in Guillermo del Toro's gothic horror film Crimson Peak. The film started filming in Toronto in February 2014, and was released in October 2015. He starred as Robert Laing in Ben Wheatley's High-Rise (2015), based on J. G. Ballard's novel of the same name.

In January 2014, Hiddleston became a spokesperson for Jaguar Cars in their "Good to be Bad" ad campaign featuring British actors in villain-themed commercials to promote Jaguar's new models. The first commercial of the campaign, titled "Rendezvous", first aired during the 2014 Super Bowl and featured Hiddleston along with Mark Strong and Ben Kingsley. Hiddleston starred in another commercial in the campaign, titled "The Art of Villainy" in April of the same year. It was released on YouTube, promoting the F-Type coupe.

It was announced in June 2014 that Hiddleston would portray country music singer Hank Williams in the 2015 biopic I Saw the Light, based on the 1994 biography. The film was directed by Marc Abraham, and was first shown in the Special Presentations section of the 2015 Toronto International Film Festival. Hiddleston spent nearly five weeks preparing for the role of Williams, performing seven of the film's soundtrack songs. The film was released on 25 March 2016, by Sony Pictures Classics. While the film was not well-received, Hiddleston's performance was widely praised by critics. Stephanie Zacharek of Time magazine called him "magnificent" adding that "he honors Williams' greatness but also wriggles beyond it."

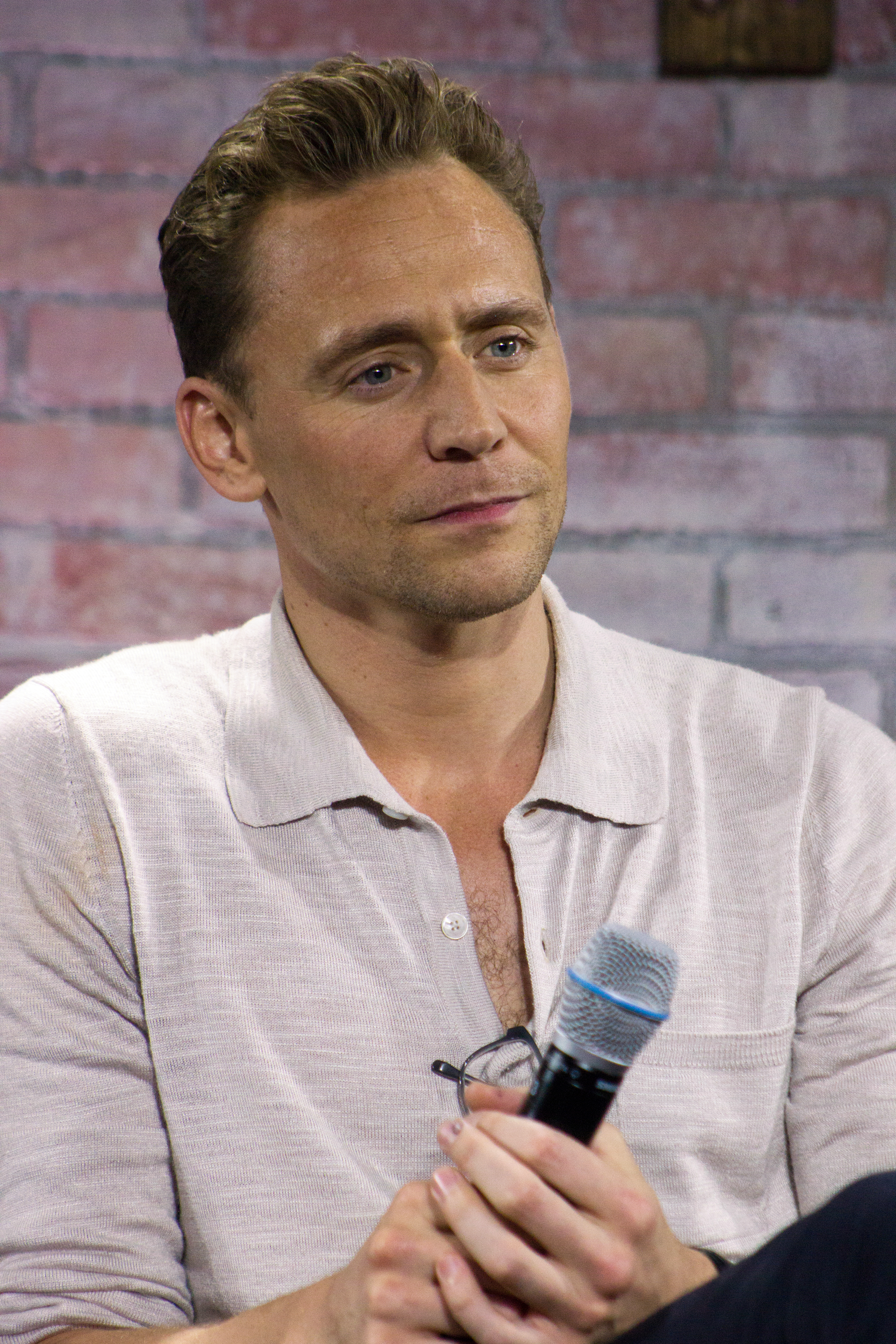
Hiddleston at the Nerd HQ in July 2016

Hiddleston was one of the narrators in the 2015 documentary Unity directed by Shaun Monson. He appeared as Jonathan Pine in the 2016 television mini-series The Night Manager based on John le Carré's novel of the same name. The series started filming in Spring 2015 and aired on BBC and AMC with Hugh Laurie also starring. Ben Travers of IndieWire noted that he carried the role of Pine from start to finish, "with an admirable determination and aptly unbreakable constitution." For his performance in the series he was nominated for several awards, including two Primetime Emmy Awards and won a Golden Globe Award for Best Actor.

In early 2017, Hiddleston expressed his will to take a long break from work, and his desire to work again in theatre. Later the same year, he starred in Legendary Pictures' King Kong film, Kong: Skull Island. Released on 10 March, and directed by Jordan Vogt-Roberts, the film was a commercial success, earning over $566 million worldwide and received generally positive reviews.

In September 2017, he played the title character in a limited run of Shakespeare's Hamlet directed by Kenneth Branagh. The production ran for three weeks at a 160-seat theater, with the tickets given out by lottery system to raise money for RADA. Michael Billington of The Guardian called his performance "a compelling Hamlet with a genuine nobility of soul". Ann Treneman of The Times praised his performance writing that he made the role "completely his own, emotional, magnetic, canny, often frolicsome" and that is "a shame is that so few will see his HiddleHamlet". Following his successful run as Hamlet, Hiddleston was given 'The Red Book', a red-bound copy of Hamlet which originally belonged to stage actor Johnston Forbes-Robertson and passed down from one actor to another who they deemed the greatest Hamlet of their generation.

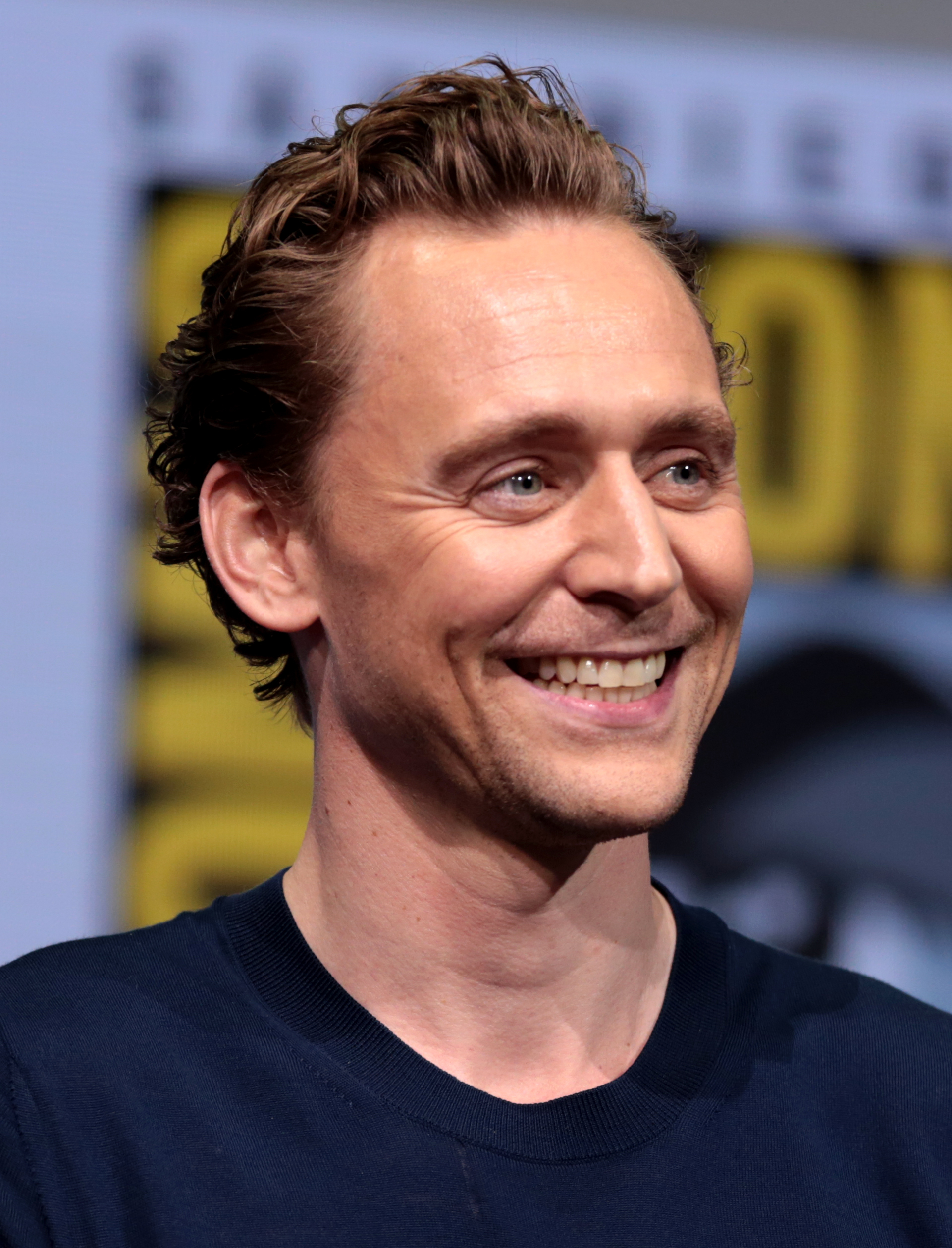
Hiddleston at the 2017 San Diego Comic-Con

He reprised the role of Loki in Thor: Ragnarok, released on 3 November 2017, and also appeared in Avengers: Infinity War (2018) and Avengers: Endgame (2019). All three films were well-received with Endgame grossing over $2 billion worldwide to rank as the highest-grossing film of all time. He voiced the villain in Nick Park's animated film Early Man, which was released in early 2018. Later that year, he appeared in the short film Leading Lady Parts in support of the Time's Up initiative alongside Emilia Clarke, Felicity Jones and Florence Pugh. In 2019, he starred as Robert from 5 March to 8 June in a revival of Harold Pinter's Betrayal at the Harold Pinter Theatre, directed by Jamie Lloyd. The play premiered to positive reviews and succeeded to have a sold-out West End run, with Henry Hitchings of the Evening Standard finding him to be "irresistibly magnetic" with an impressive "poise and sensitivity" in his part. In August 2019, he made his Broadway debut reprising the role of Robert in Betrayal, as the production transferred to Broadway for a 17-week limited engagement at the Bernard B. Jacobs Theatre. Reviewing the Broadway staging in Variety, Marilyn Stasio called Hiddleston's performance "a striking physical, as well as an emotionally complicated one". He received a Tony Award for Best Actor in a Play nomination for it.

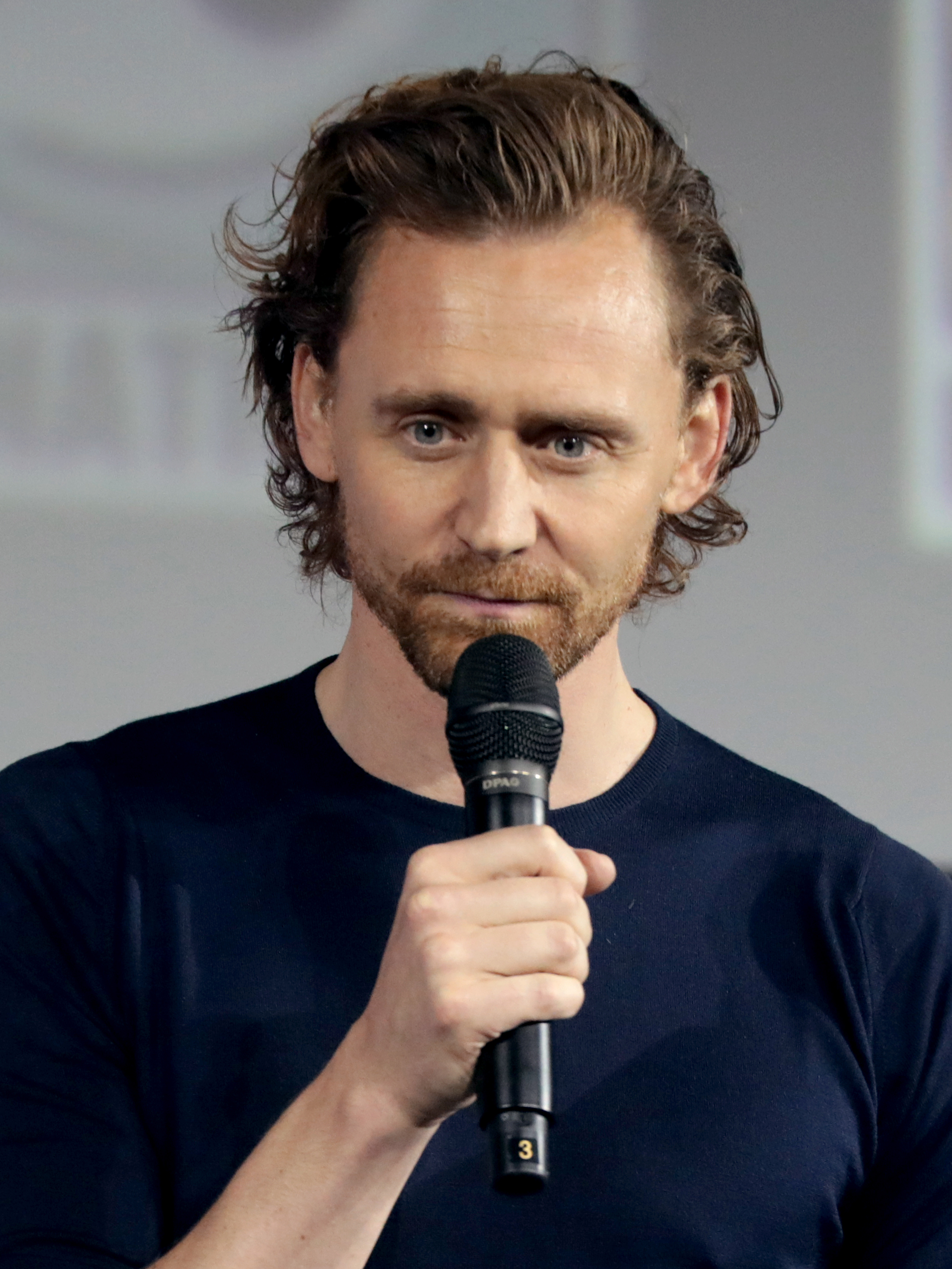
Hiddleston at the 2019 San Diego Comic-Con

Hiddleston narrated Earth At Night In Color, an American nature documentary television series created by Offspring Films. The series premiered on 4 December 2020 on Apple TV+, with a second season premiering on 16 April 2021. Initially announced in November 2018, Hiddleston reprised his role as Loki in Loki which premiered on Disney+ in June 2021. The primarily Norwegian-language song Very Full he sings in the third episode of Loki debuted at number ten on the Billboard World Digital Song Sales. Loki received generally favorable reviews, and on 14 July 2021 was officially renewed for a second season. Michael Idato, reviewing for The Sydney Morning Herald concluded that "Hiddleston's performance as Loki has always been defined by its humour as much as its pathos. Both seem to be on display in equal measure in Loki". TVLine named him "Performer of the Week" after the first season ended, stating that "Hiddleston had to bring back a greedier, more insolent version of the God of Mischief, while also softening him enough. It was a delicate balance for the actor, and one he struck beautifully". The second season of Loki premiered in October 2023, with Hiddleston being dubbed as "the MCU's most versatile performer".

In 2021, Hiddleston started as the special guest start in the 20th anniversary revival of The Play What I Wrote, with performances at the Birmingham Repertory Theatre, Theatre Royal, Bath and Chichester Festival Theatre. In March 2021, it was announced that Hiddleston had joined the cast of the Apple TV+ drama series The Essex Serpent, based on the novel of the same name by Sarah Perry. He played the role of Reverend Will Ransome opposite Cora Seaborne, played by Claire Danes. The series premiered on 13 May 2022. In August 2021, he voiced Loki in the animated series What If...?. Hiddleston has also made voice appearances in The Simpsons short films on Disney+ as Loki. The short film The Good, the Bart, and the Loki was released in July 2021 and Welcome to the Club in September 2022.

In 2023, Hiddleston narrated a ten episode nature documentary series called Big Beasts, and a 12 episode nature documentary series in 2024 called Earthsounds, both for Apple TV+.

In 2024, he starred in The Life of Chuck, an adaptation of Stephen King's novella of the same name. It premiered at the Toronto International Film Festival on 6 September 2024, where it won the People's Choice Award.

In 2025, Hiddleston starred as Benedick in The Jamie Lloyd Company's production of Shakespeare's Much Ado About Nothing, which completed a sold-out run at Theatre Royal, Drury Lane, and set a new box office record for a play in the West End. In April 2025, the production concluded with the five highest-grossing weeks for a play in West End history, with the final week achieving the highest box office figures to date. The play went on to transfer to Broadway in 2026.

In 2026, Hiddleston hosted and executive produced the three-part National Geographic docudrama Pompeii: Out of Time with Tom Hiddleston, which combined documentary investigation with dramatised reconstructions of the eruption of Mount Vesuvius in AD 79. The series premiered on 22 July 2026, with all three episodes airing back-to-back on National Geographic, before becoming available for streaming the following day on Disney+ and Hulu. The series explored archaeological evidence and the experiences of several inhabitants of Pompeii and Herculaneum during the disaster.

In 2026. Hiddleston played Edmund Hillary in Jennifer Peedom's film Tenzing, which is Hiddleston's highest rated film on Rotten Tomatoes to date.

== Public image and acting style ==
One of the most high-profile actors in contemporary British popular culture, Hiddleston appeared on Debrett's 2017 list of the most influential people in the United Kingdom. In 2015, he was named the British Film Institute's first official founding ambassador. In 2016, Hiddleston was awarded the male Rear of the Year title, a light-hearted accolade that recognises British celebrities who are found to have a notable posterior. He has been named most stylish/best dressed man in several listings. Taffy Brodesser-Akner of GQ describes his off-screen persona as "a sweet-natured bookworm given the face and body of the only man who should ever be allowed to wear a suit". His Crimson Peak director Guillermo del Toro and the comic book writer Stan Lee have called him "the nicest guy on earth" and "the nicest guy you'll ever meet".

Kenneth Branagh noted that the first time he ever saw Hiddleston, playing Cassio in Othello, it was clear to him that he was an utterly naturalistic speaker of Shakespeare. Michael Billington of The Guardian wrote that Hiddleston's key acting quality is "his ability to combine a sweet sadness with an incandescent fury, suggesting a fierce intellect gnawed by intense melancholy and yet subject to bouts of intemperate rage". Charles McNulty of the Los Angeles Times describes Hiddleston as "an actor of uncommon intelligence and Pre-Raphaelite beauty".The Daily Telegraph's Dominic Cavendish suggested that Hiddleston "has got the theatrical acting chops to head up there among the greats", while The Independent's Paul Taylor remarked that "his range is beginning to look pretty limitless". David Fear of Rolling Stone opined that there are two sides to Hiddleston, the old-school movie star of Midnight in Paris, War Horse or The Night Manager, and the "unpredictable, borderline weirdo version" of him seen in characters like Loki or in High-Rise, adding that Hiddleston refuses to settle on one specific kind of role.

Hiddleston has stated that method acting does not help him as a collaborator.

== Personal life ==
Hiddleston resides in the Belsize Park area of north-west London as of 2016.

Tom Hiddleston is an Arsenal fan. He interviewed the team's manager Mikel Arteta after the team finally won the title after a 22 year-wait at the end of 2025–26 Premier League season.

From 2008 to 2011, Hiddleston dated English actress Susannah Fielding, whom he met while filming an episode of Wallander. In 2016, Hiddleston briefly dated American singer-songwriter Taylor Swift.

Hiddleston is in a relationship with British actress and writer Zawe Ashton. In October 2018, the pair performed at Dickens vs Tolstoy debate for Intelligence Squared, and went on to co-star in the 2019 revival of Harold Pinter's play Betrayal on the West End and Broadway. Their relationship became public in September 2021 when they appeared together at the Tony Awards. The couple announced their engagement in March 2022. They have two children.Ashton and Hiddleston have not publicly announced a marriage, although Ashton has occasionally referred to Hiddleston as her husband, and Hiddleston has referred to Ashton as his wife.

=== Philanthropy ===
Hiddleston has donated items for auction and has supported several charities, including the Small Steps Project, Starlight Children's Foundation, Cure EB, Comic Relief, Red Nose Day USA, Thomas Coram Foundation for Children, Great Ormond Street Hospital, Amnesty International and Chance to Shine.

He is a UK ambassador of the humanitarian and developmental assistance fund group UNICEF. He travelled to Guinea in early 2013 to raise awareness about hunger and malnutrition, and to South Sudan in early 2015 and late 2016 to report the devastating effects of the civil war on children in the country.

Hiddleston identifies as a feminist. In February 2018, he was listed as one of the donors to the Justice and Equality Fund, the UK version of the Time's Up initiative. He is also an ambassador of the Illuminating BAFTA campaign, which aims to provide opportunities to those who otherwise would not have been given a chance in the film, games and television industries.

Hiddleston took part in the Soccer Aid for UNICEF's charity match as a player for the England squad on 11 June 2023 at Old Trafford along with other celebrities. In 2024, Hiddleston returned as a player for the England squad, which went on to win the match. In 2025, he returned to Soccer Aid as a manager for the England squad.

== Acting credits and awards ==
According to Rotten Tomatoes and Box Office Mojo, Hiddleston's most critically acclaimed and commercially successful films are Unrelated (2007), Archipelago (2010), Thor (2011), Midnight in Paris (2011), The Avengers (2012), Only Lovers Left Alive (2013), Thor: The Dark World (2013), Kong: Skull Island (2017), Thor: Ragnarok (2017), Avengers: Infinity War (2018), Avengers: Endgame (2019), The Life of Chuck (2024) and Tenzing (2026).

Hiddleston has received a Golden Globe Award and a Laurence Olivier Award among other accolades.
