= James Fleet =

British actor (born 1952)

- Born: James Edward Fleet; 11 March 1952 (age 74); Bilston, England
- Education: Royal Conservatoire of Scotland
- Occupation: Actor
- Years active: 1979–present
- Spouse: Jane Booker (m. 1984)
- Children: 1

James Edward Fleet (born 11 March 1952) is a British actor of theatre, radio and screen. He is most famous for his roles as the bumbling and well-meaning Tom in the 1994 British romantic comedy film Four Weddings and a Funeral and the dim-witted but kind-hearted Hugo Horton in the BBC sitcom television series The Vicar of Dibley. Since 2020, he has played King George III in the Netflix series Bridgerton.

== Early life ==
Fleet was born in Bilston, to a Scottish mother, Christine, and an English father, Jim. His mother was a cleaner and his father a tool-maker; the family lived in Bilston, West Midlands. Fleet's father died aged 49 from muscular dystrophy, when his son was ten; James and his mother then moved to Aberdeenshire. He studied engineering at university in Aberdeen, where he joined the university dramatic society. Afterwards, he studied at the Royal Scottish Academy of Music and Drama in Glasgow.

== Career ==
=== Stage ===
Fleet began his career in the RSC, appearing in several plays in the early 1980s. He has since appeared in touring productions of, among others, Habeas Corpus and In the Club, as well as in Festen and Mary Stuart and others in the West End. In 2000 he appeared in David Pugh and Sean Connery's production of the French play "Art" by Yasmina Reza at the Wyndham's Theatre in London. He played Serge alongside Stephen Tompkinson as Yvan as Serge and Michael French as Marc. He also played Alderman Fitzwarren in Dick Whittington in 2002.

In 2003, he played Kulygin in Anton Chekhov's Three Sisters alongside Kristin Scott Thomas who played Masha.

In 2009, he portrayed Sir Andrew Aguecheek in the RSC Production of Twelfth Night. In 2011 he was in Richard Bean's The Heretic directed by Jeremy Herrin at the Royal Court Theatre in London. Starting in November 2011, he was in the original line-up of The Ladykillers as Major Courtney at the Gielgud Theatre.

=== Radio ===
Between 2000 and 2006, Fleet played the painfully upright and decent Captain Brimshaw in Revolting People, a BBC Radio 4 comedy set in pre-revolutionary America. He also appeared in the radio legal sitcom Chambers, which later moved onto television. As of 2005, he has starred as Duncan Stonebridge MP in the topical radio sitcom The Party Line. He also appeared as the Captain on the BBC Radio 7 series The Spaceship. He also plays the part of Sir John Woodstock in the BBC Radio 4 sitcom The Castle and Inspector Lestrade in the first, third and fourth series of The Rivals. Fleet played John Aubrey in the 2008 BBC Radio 4 Woman's Hour production by Nick Warburton of Aubrey's Brief Lives.

=== Television ===
From 1999–2001, Fleet was the voice of "Dog" in the children's TV show Dog and Duck. Probably his most famous role is that of Hugo in The Vicar of Dibley; he appeared in all 20 episodes, broadcast between 1994 and 2007. In 2004, he appeared in an episode of Monarch of the Glen. In 2005, he played a leading role in an episode of the long-running ITV murder mystery series Midsomer Murders. In 2007, he was a guest star in one episode of the sitcom Legit. He appeared as Frederick Dorrit in the BBC's 2008 production of Little Dorrit. When Fleet appeared on the quiz show School's Out, it was revealed that one of his teachers at Banff Academy had written in his school report that "[James] is the stupidest boy I have ever had to teach, out of all the stupid boys I have ever had to teach," and that he was the only student in his sixth form not to have been made a prefect. Despite his apparent lack of scholastic ability, he still won the show. In 2009, Fleet appeared in a cameo role in the third series of Skins.

Earlier in his career, Fleet was seen in a 1983 episode of Grange Hill as a teacher at the eponymous school's upmarket rival Rodney Bennett. In 1992, he played Paul Morgan in an episode of The Bill 'Runaway'. In 1999, he starred in the sitcom Brotherly Love.

Fleet appeared in Coronation Street in 2010. He played a character called Robbie Sloan, a recently released convict, helping escaped prisoner Tony Gordon plot revenge on his ex-wife Carla Connor. They intend to kidnap and kill her. Sloan lures Connor into her Underworld factory, and holds her at gunpoint. Leaving her tied to a chair with her mouth taped shut, Sloan also lures Hayley Cropper into the hostage situation. Sloan was eventually shot by Gordon during a siege at the factory.

In February 2011, Fleet appeared as George (senior), the father of werewolf George Sands, in Being Human.

In December 2013, the BBC aired one of their major dramas for the Christmas season, Death Comes to Pemberley, a three-part British television drama based on characters created by Jane Austen in her novel Pride and Prejudice. The first episode was broadcast on BBC One at 8.15 pm on Boxing Day 2013. It was based on the best-selling novel by P. D. James, in which the characters of Pride and Prejudice are involved in a new story involving a murder. Fleet played the part of Mr. Bennett in the series. In September 2014, Fleet appeared in the BBC Three sitcom Bad Education as Richard, an ex-boyfriend of Rosie Gulliver. He has most recently appeared in an episode of ITVs second series of Plebs, as Stylax's racing patron. In 2013, Fleet was engaged to play Scottish historian, the Reverend Dr. Reginald Wakefield, in seasons 1 and 2 of the Award-winning Starz adaptation of Diana Gabaldon's Outlander, broadcast from 2014–2016.

An April 2021 announcement stated that Fleet would be joining the cast of the second season of All Creatures Great and Small in the role of Colonel Merrick.

Fleet has recurred as King George III in the Netflix romantic period drama Bridgerton, reprising the role in spin-off series Queen Charlotte: A Bridgerton Story.

=== Film ===
Fleet has appeared in numerous films. He played the role of Kevin's father in the 2000 film Kevin & Perry Go Large. He played the roles of Lefevre in the 2004 film adaptation of Phantom of the Opera, John Dashwood in 1995's Sense and Sensibility, and Lytton Strachey in the 2003 film Al Sur de Granada (South from Granada). In 2014, he played John Constable in the Mike Leigh film Mr. Turner. In 2016, he played Sir Reginald DeCourcy in Whit Stillman's Love and Friendship.

== Personal life ==
Fleet married the actress Jane Booker in 1984. The marriage produced one child. The couple reside in Sibford Gower, Oxfordshire.

== Tributes ==
In 2025, Fleet appeared on a British postage stamp issued as part of a special set by Royal Mail, which commemorated the series The Vicar of Dibley.

== Filmography ==
=== Film ===
Year	Title	Role	Notes
1985	Defence of the Realm	Ministry Man	
1992	Electric Moon	Simon Lidell	
1992	Blue Black Permanent	Jim Thorburn	
1994	Four Weddings and a Funeral	Tom - Wedding One	
1995	The Grotesque	Inspector Limp	aka Grave Indiscretion and Gentlemen Don't Eat Poets
1995	Sense and Sensibility	John Dashwood	
1995	The Butterfly Effect	Oswald	
1997	Thursday	Patrick	Short film
1997	Remember Me?	Donald	
1999	Big Dreams and Paper Planes	Son	Short film
1999	Milk	Adrian	
2000	Kevin & Perry Go Large	Dad	
2001	Charlotte Gray	Richard Cannerly	
2002	Two Men Went to War	Major Bates	
2003	South from Granada	Lytton Strachey	aka Al sur de Granada (original title)
2003	Blackball	Alan the Pipe	
2004	The Phantom of the Opera	Monsieur Lefevre	
2005	Tristram Shandy: A Cock and Bull Story	Simon	
2007	Lady Godiva: Back in the Saddle	Alan Jenkins	
2011	The Decoy Bride	William	
2014	Mr. Turner	John Constable	
2016	Love & Friendship	Sir Reginald DeCourcy	
2016	Revolution: New Art for a New World	Wassily Kandinsky (voice)	Documentary film
2017	Love of My Life	Tom	
2018	The Spy Who Dumped Me	Tom	
2019	Born a King	George V	
2020	Blithe Spirit	Harry Price	
2021	Operation Mincemeat	Charles Fraser-Smith	
2022	Wolf Manor	Oliver	aka Scream of the Wolf (U.S. title)
2022	The Lost King	John Ashdown-Hill	
2023	My Mother's Wedding	Geoff	
2024	Broken Bird	Mr. Thomas	

=== Television ===
Year	Title	Role	Notes
1979	The Omega Factor	Ian	Episode 9: "Double Vision"
1983	Grange Hill	Mr. Perkins	Series 6; episode 5
1984	All the World's a Stage	Reading from the 1572 Act of Parliament	Mini-series; episode 5: "A Muse of Fire"
1985	Dempsey and Makepeace	Man in Office	Series 2; episode 9: "In the Dark"
1987	Still Crazy Like a Fox	Bellhop	Television film, aka Crazy Like a Fox: The Movie
1987	The Ruth Rendell Mysteries	Neil Fairfax	Series 3; episodes 4 & 5: "A Sleeping Life: Parts One & Two"
1991	Boon	Keith Dawson, Prosecution Barrister	Series 6; episode 3: "Trial and Error"
1991	Screen Two	Bob	Series 7; episode 11: "They Never Slept"
1992	Screen Two	Peter Wentworth	Series 8; episode 8: "Common Pursuit"
1992	The Advocates	Philip Jackson	Series 2; episodes 1–3
1992	The Bill	Paul Morgan	Series 8; episode 43: "Runaway"
1992	Screen One	James Grahame	Series 4; episode 6: "Running Late"
1993	Screen Two	Algie	Series 9; episode 4: "Femme Fatale"
1993	A Year in Provence	Hugo Compton	Mini-series; episode 7: "Room Service"
1993	An Exchange of Fire	Michael Shanks	Episodes 1 & 2
1994	Headhunters	Alan Spence	Episodes 1–3: "The Golden Hello", "Maradonna Land" & "Right as Rain"
1994	Murder Most Horrid	Tom	Series 2; episode 4: "We All Hate Granny"
1994	Cracker	Michael Trant	Series 2; episodes 4–6: "The Big Crunch: Parts 1–3"
1994	Milner	Hugh Bonning	Television film
1994–2007	The Vicar of Dibley	Hugo Horton	Series 1–3 and 6 specials; 20 episodes
1995	3 Steps to Heaven	Harry Roberts	Television films
1996	Lord of Misrule	Prime Minister	Television films
1996	Eskimo Day	Simon	Television films
1996	Screen Two	Prime Minister	Series 14; episode 1: "Crossing the Floor"
1996	The Fortunes and Misfortunes of Moll Flanders	James Bland	Mini-series; episode 3
1997	Cows	Thor Johnson	Pilot episode
1997	Harry Enfield and Chums	Teacher, Mr. Banks	Series 2; episode 3
1997	Gobble	Prime Minister (voice)	Television film
1997	A Dance to the Music of Time	Moreland	Mini-series; episodes 2–4
1997	Underworld	William Smith	Mini-series; episodes 1–6
1997	Spark	Ashley Parkerwell	Episodes 1–6
1998	Frenchman's Creek	Sir Harry	Television films
1999	The Nearly Complete and Utter History of Everything	William the Conqueror	Television films
2000	Brotherly Love	Frank Robertson	Episodes 1–6
2000–2001	Chambers	Hilary Tipping	Series 1 & 2; 12 episodes
2002	Dick Whittington	Alderman Fitzwarren	Television films
2002	Fields of Gold	Alan Buckley	Television films
2002	Dog and Duck	Dog (voice)	Series 1–3; 195 episodes
2002	Young Arthur	Merlin	Television films
2003	Promoted to Glory	Michael Prendergast	Television films
2004	Three Sisters	Kulygin	Television films
2004	Family Business	David	Episode 5
2004	Murder in Suburbia	John Stanton	Series 1; episode 5: "A Good Deal of Attention"
2004	Monarch of the Glen	Liam	Series 6; episode 6
2005	Midsomer Murders	Ralph Plummer	Series 8; episode 7: "Sauce for the Goose"
2005	Sea of Souls	Findlay Morrison	Series 2; episodes 1 & 2: "Amulet: Parts 1 & 2"
2007	Legit	Peter	Episode 5: "Danny, Champion of the World"
2008	Harley Street	Max Rogers	Episode 5
2008	Little Dorrit	Frederick Dorrit	Mini-series; 9 episodes
2009	Skins	Martin	Series 3; episode 4: "Pandora"
2009	Hotel Babylon	Martin Armstrong	Series 4; episode 5
2009	Micro Men	Kenneth Baker	Television film
2010	Coronation Street	Robbie Sloan	7 episodes
2011	Being Human	George Senior	Series 3; episode 6: "Daddy Ghoul"
2012	Lewis	Dr. Alex Falconer	Series 6; episode 1: "The Soul of Genius"
2012	Comedy Showcase	Arthur Marvin	Series 3; episode 6: "The Function Room"
2012	Just Around the Corner	Ed	Television film
2013	Death in Paradise	Jeremy Tipping	Series 2; episode 3: "Death in the Clinic"
2013	Red Nose Day 2013	Hugo Horton	Vicar of Dibley sketch for Comic Relief
2013	It's Kevin	Various characters	Episodes 1 & 3–5
2013	Murder on the Home Front	Professor Stephens	Television film
2013	Toast of London	Various characters	Series 2; episode 1
2013	Big Bad World	Neil Turnbull	5 episodes
2013	Citizen Khan	Professor Stevens	Series 2; episode 1: "Alia's College"
2013	Death Comes to Pemberley	Mr. Bennett	Mini-series; episodes 1 & 2
2014	Father Brown	Dr. Adam Crawford	Series 2; episode 9: "The Grim Reaper"
2014	Blandings	Colonel Fanshawe	Series 2; episode 5: "Sticky Wicket at Blandings"
2014	Comedy Playhouse	Father Abbot	Series 16; episode 3: "Monks"
2014	Bad Education	Richard	Series 3; episodes 2 & 3: "After School Clubs" & "Sports Day"
2014	Plebs	Gaius Maecenas	Series 2; episode 4: "The Patron"
2014–2016	Outlander	Reverend Wakefield	Series 1 & 2; 6 episodes
2015	Partners in Crime	Major Anthony Carter	Mini-series; episodes 1–6
2015	Top Coppers	Charles Leatherby	Episodes 2 & 3: "The Girdle of Randall Rogers" & "The Venom of Doctor Schafer"
2016	Billionaire Boy	Mr. Darrow	Television film
2016	Indian Summers	Lord Hawthorne	Series 2; episodes 2–5
2016	Houdini and Doyle	Dr. Pilsen	Mini-series; episode 7: "Bedlam"
2016	The Hollow Crown	Hastings	Series 2; episodes 2 & 3: "Henry VI, Part 2" & "Richard III"
2017	Urban Myths	The Professor	Series 1; episode 3: "Hitler the Artist"
2017	Tracey Ullman's Show	Tough Man / Award's Host / Archie	Series 2; episodes 1, 5 & 6
2017	Hospital People	Neville Burley	Episode 6: "The Charity Single"
2017	Midsomer Murders	Michael Falconer	Series 19; episode 6: "The Curse of the Ninth"
2018	Unforgotten	Chris Lowe	Series 3; episodes 1–6
2018	Patrick Melrose	Sir Victor Eisen	Mini-series; episode 2: "Never Mind"
2018	Death on the Tyne	Jack	Television film
2019	One Red Nose and a Wedding	Tom	Television short film for Comic Relief
2019	The Importance of Being Oscar	Canterville Ghost / Basil Hallward	Television documentary film
2019	Thanks for the Memories	Patrick Conway	Mini-series; episodes 1 & 2
2020	The Pale Horse	Oscar Venables	Mini-series; episode 1: "Part One"
2020	Belgravia	Reverend Stephen Bellasis	Mini-series; episodes 2–6
2020	The Watch	Archchancellor of Unseen University	Episodes 2 & 5: "Ook" & "Not on My Watch"
2020–2022	Bridgerton	King George III	Series 1; episodes 5 & 6, & series 2; episode 6
2021	All Creatures Great and Small	Colonel Merrick	Series 2; episode 2: "Semper Progrediens"
2022–2023	Dodger	Judge Fang	Series 1 & 2; 6 episodes
2023	Tom Jones	Squire Allworthy	Mini-series; episodes 1, 2 & 4
2023	Queen Charlotte: A Bridgerton Story	King George III	Mini-series; episode 6: "Crown Jewels"
2023	Beyond Paradise	Ernest Buchanan	Series 2; episode: "Christmas Special"
2024	The Devil's Hour	Greg Wiseman	Series 2; episode 3: "Something Beginning with D"
2025	Brian and Maggie	Ronnie Millar	Episode 1
2025	I, Jack Wright	Bobby	Episodes 1–6
2025	The Feud	Derek Abshire	Episodes 1–6

== Radio dramas ==
Year	Title	Role	Radio	Notes	Ref.
1986	The Vacillations of Poppy Carew	Victor	BBC Radio 4		
1996–1999	Chambers	Hilary Tripping	BBC Radio 4		
2000	As You Like It	Touchstone	BBC Radio 3	Sunday Play	
2000–2006	Revolting People	Captain Brimshaw	BBC Radio 4		
2005	The Party Line	Duncan Stonebridge MP	BBC Radio 4		
2005	The Spaceship	Captain Gordon 'Flashdance' Taylor	BBC Radio 7		
2006	Quartermaine's Terms	Mark Sackling	BBC Radio 4		
2007–2012	The Castle	Sir John Woodstock	BBC Radio 4		
2008	Brief Lives	John Aubrey	BBC Radio 4		
2008	Fortunes of War	Yakimov	BBC Radio 4	Classic Serial	
2008	Max Warp	O'Reilley	BBC Radio 7	Big Finish Productions	
2011	Gormenghast	Prunesquallor	BBC Radio 4	Classic Serial	
2011	The History of Titus Groan		BBC Radio 4	Classic Serial	
2011	The Rivals	Inspector Lestrade	BBC Radio 4		
2013	Greenmantle	Sandy Arbuthnot	BBC Radio 4 Extra		
2015	Decline and Fall	Prendergast	BBC Radio 4		
2018–2020	Quanderhorn	Professor Darius Quanderhorn	BBC Radio 4		
2019	Coriolanus	Menenius Agrippa	BBC Radio 3		
2023	Henry IV, Part 2	Robert Shallow	BBC Radio 3		

== Theatre ==
Year	Title	Role	Director	Venue	Notes	Ref.
1981	The Witch of Edmonton	Somerton	Barry Kyle	The Other Place	Press night	
1981–1982	Money	Club Member / Servant	Bill Alexander	Barbican Theatre		
1981–1982	A Midsummer Night's Dream	Francis Flute	Ron Daniels	Royal Shakespeare Theatre		
1982	Henry IV, Part 1	Peto	Trevor Nunn	Barbican Theatre		
1982	Henry IV, Part 2	Peto / Francis Feeble	Trevor Nunn	Barbican Theatre		
1982	Within a Word	Performer	Cicely Berry	Gulbenkian Studio		
1982	The Twin Rivals	Subtleman	John Caird	Pit Theatre	Press night	
1982–1983	Peter Pan	Slightly	Trevor Nunn & John Caird	Barbican Theatre	World premiere	
1983	The Dillen	Joshua Farr / Postmaster / Walt Clack	Barry Kyle	The Other Place	Press night	
1983	A New Way to Pay Old Debts	Amble / Creditor	Adrian Noble	The Other Place	Press night	
1983	The Time of Your Life	Willie	Howard Davies	The Other Place	Press night	
1983	Volpone	Peregrine	Bill Alexander	The Other Place	Press night	.
1984	Volpone	Peregrine	Bill Alexander	Gulbenkian Studio		
1984	Volpone	Peregrine	Bill Alexander	Pit Theatre		
1984–1985	A New Way to Pay Old Debts	Amble / Creditor	Adrian Noble	Barbican Theatre		
1984–1985	Waste		John Barton	Barbican Theatre		
1987	The Taming of the Shrew	Hortensio	Jonathan Miller	Royal Shakespeare Theatre		
1987	Hyde Park		Barry Kyle	Barbican Theatre		
1987–1988	The Jew of Malta	Lodowick	Barry Kyle	Barbican Theatre		
1988	The Churchill Play	Captain Thompson	Barry Kyle	Barbican Theatre		
1989	As You Like It	Oliver	Tim Albery	The Old Vic		
1990	Berenice	Arsace	Tim Albery	Royal National Theatre		
1991	The Government Inspector	Bobchinsky	Matthew Francis	Greenwich Theatre		
1991	Just Between Ourselves	Neil	Terry Johnson	Bristol Old Vic		
1999	The Late Middle Classes	Charles Smithers / Holly in 40s	Harold Pinter	Watford Palace Theatre		
2005	Mary Stuart	Sir Amyas Paulet	Phyllida Lloyd	Donmar Warehouse		
2005–2006	Mary Stuart	Sir Amyas Paulet	Phyllida Lloyd	Apollo Theatre		
2009	Cloud 9	Clive	Thea Sharrock	Almeida Theatre		
2009	Twelfth Night	Sir Andrew Aguecheek	Gregory Doran	Courtyard Theatre		
2009	The Observer	Saunders	Richard Eyre	Royal National Theatre		
2011	The Heretic	Professor Kevin Maloney	Jeremy Herrin	Royal Court Theatre		
2011	The Ladykillers	Major Courtney	Sean Foley	Gielgud Theatre		
2016	Les Blancs	Dr. Willy Dekoven	Yaël Farber	Royal National Theatre		
2023	Noises Off	Selsdon Mowbray	Lindsay Posner	Theatre Royal Haymarket		
