= Henry IV, Part I and Part II (The Hollow Crown) =

- The Hollow Crown episodes
- Episode nos.: Series 1 Episodes 2 and 3
- Directed by: Richard Eyre
- Teleplay by: Richard Eyre
- Based on: Henry IV, Part 1 Henry IV, Part 2 by William Shakespeare
- Cinematography by: Ben Smithard
- Original air dates: 7 July 2012 Part I; 14 July 2012 Part II

Episode chronology
← Previous "Richard II"	Next → "Henry V"

"Henry IV, Part I" and "Henry IV, Part II" are the second and third episodes of the first series of the British television series The Hollow Crown, based on the second set of plays in William Shakespeare's Henriad. The episodes were produced by Sam Mendes, directed and adapted by Richard Eyre and starred Jeremy Irons as King Henry IV, Simon Russell Beale as Falstaff and Tom Hiddleston as Prince Hal. Much of the cast and crew of both episodes overlap and the plot flows directly from the first to the second. The episodes were first broadcast on 7 July and 14 July 2012 on BBC Two.

Henry IV, Part 1 and Henry IV, Part 2 are the second and third plays in Shakespeare's tetralogy dealing with the successive reigns of Richard II, Henry IV, and Henry V.

Simon Russell Beale won the 2013 British Academy Television Award (BAFTA) for Supporting actor for his performance as Falstaff.

== Cast ==
Actors appear in both parts unless noted.

- Jeremy Irons as King Henry IV
- Simon Russell Beale as Sir John Falstaff
- Tom Hiddleston as Prince Hal
- Julie Walters as Mistress Quickly
- Alun Armstrong as Earl of Northumberland
- Joe Armstrong as Sir Henry "Hotspur" Percy (Part 1)
- David Bamber as Robert Shallow (Part 2)
- Niamh Cusack as Countess of Northumberland (Part 2)
- David Dawson as Ned Poins
- Michelle Dockery as Lady Kate Percy
- Tom Georgeson as Bardolph
- Iain Glen as Earl of Warwick (Part 2)
- Nicholas Jones as Archbishop of York (Part 2)
- David Hayman as Earl of Worcester (Part 1)
- James Laurenson as Earl of Westmoreland
- Geoffrey Palmer as Lord Chief Justice (Part 2)
- Harry Lloyd as Edmund Mortimer (Part 1)
- Maxine Peake as Doll Tearsheet
- Paul Ritter as Ancient Pistol (Part 2)
- Robert Pugh as Owen Glendower (Part 1)
- Alex Clatworthy as Lady Mortimer (Part 1)
- Ian Conningham as Peto
- Stephen McCole as Lord Douglas (Part 1)
- Adam Kotz as Hastings (Part 2)
- Henry Faber as Prince John of Lancaster
- Mark Tandy as Sir Richard Vernon (Part 1)
- Pip Torrens as Mowbray (Part 2)
- Tim McMullan as Silence (Part 2)
- Michael Keane as Thomas Wart (Part 2)
- Dominic Rowan as Coleville of the Dale (Part 2)
- Jolyon Coy as Sir Walter Blunt (Part 1)
- Reece Shearsmith as Davy (Part 2)

== Production ==
"Henry IV, Part I" and "Henry IV, Part II" were filmed simultaneously from January to March 2012. The films were shot on location and at Ealing Studios in London, where the Boar's Head Tavern set was created. Scenes at Henry IV's court in the Palace of Westminster were filmed at Gloucester Cathedral. Caerphilly Castle in Wales was used both for the scenes set at Warkworth Castle and for the meeting with Glendower. The Battle of Shrewsbury was filmed in a field near Rickmansworth during a winter snowfall. Although the battle took place in July, director Richard Eyre said he was delighted by the result: "The grass of the English landscape tends to subvert the violence of battle, so the snow turned the setting into this monochromatic world."

== Release ==
"Henry IV, Part I" aired on BBC2 on Saturday, 7 July 2012. The start time was delayed by an hour because of coverage of the 2012 Wimbledon Championships, and the film was subsequently repeated on Sunday, 8 July on BBC4. "Henry IV, Part II" aired the following Saturday, 14 July.
