= The Hollow Crown (TV series) =

British television series

- Genre: Historical drama
- Based on: Shakespearean history by William Shakespeare
- Developed by: Rupert Goold; Ben Power; Richard Eyre; Dominic Cooke
- Directed by: Rupert Goold; Richard Eyre; Thea Sharrock; Dominic Cooke
- Starring: See full list below
- Music by: Stephen Warbeck; Adam Cork; Adrian Johnston; Dan Jones
- Country of origin: United Kingdom
- Original language: English

Production
- Executive producer: Sam Mendes
- Producer: Rupert Ryle-Hodges
- Running time: varies
- Production companies: Neal Street Productions; NBCUniversal; WNET

Original release
- Network: BBC Two; PBS
- Release: 30 June 2012 – 21 May 2016

The Hollow Crown is a British television series which aired from 30 June 2012 to 21 May 2016 on BBC Two. It is an adaptation of William Shakespeare's history plays. The first series is an adaptation of Shakespeare's second historical tetralogy, the Henriad: Richard II, Henry IV, Part 1, Henry IV, Part 2 and Henry V and aired in 2012. The concluding second series which aired in 2016 and known as The Hollow Crown: The Wars of the Roses, a reference to the series of English civil wars known as the Wars of the Roses, are based on Shakespeare's first tetralogy: Henry VI, Part 1, Henry VI, Part 2, Henry VI, Part 3, and Richard III. Both series received widespread praise for their production and performances.

== Overview ==
The first series is an adaptation of Shakespeare's second historical tetralogy, the Henriad: Richard II, Henry IV, Part 1, Henry IV, Part 2 and Henry V, starring Ben Whishaw, Jeremy Irons and Tom Hiddleston. Olivier Award winners Rupert Goold, Richard Eyre and Thea Sharrock directed the telefilms, which were produced by Rupert Ryle-Hodges for BBC Two and executive produced by Sam Mendes and Pippa Harris under Neal Street Productions in association with NBCUniversal. The first series, which aired in the United Kingdom in 2012, received positive reviews from critics. Ben Whishaw and Simon Russell Beale won British Academy Television Awards for Leading actor and Supporting actor for their performances as Richard II and Falstaff, respectively, and Jeremy Irons was nominated for a Screen Actors Guild Award for Best Actor for his role as Henry IV. The first episode, Richard II, was nominated for the Best Single Drama at the BAFTA TV Awards.

The BBC aired the concluding series in 2016 as The Hollow Crown: The Wars of the Roses, a reference to the series of English civil wars known as the Wars of the Roses, starring Benedict Cumberbatch, Hugh Bonneville, Judi Dench, Sophie Okonedo and Tom Sturridge. The plays were produced in 2015 by the same team that made the first series of films but were directed by the former artistic director of Royal Court Theatre and Olivier Award winner, Dominic Cooke. They are based on Shakespeare's first tetralogy: Henry VI, Part 1, Henry VI, Part 2, Henry VI, Part 3 and Richard III. The adaptation presents Henry VI in two parts, incorporating all three Henry VI plays. Benedict Cumberbatch was nominated for the BAFTA Television Award for Best Leading Actor and The Wars of the Roses was nominated for Best Mini-Series.

The title of the series is taken from a line in Richard II:

For within the hollow crown
That rounds the mortal temples of a king
Keeps Death his court...

— Richard II, act 3, scene 2

== Cast ==
- A dark grey cell indicates the character was not in the film
- Italics indicates a non-speaking cameo appearance

Role	The Hollow Crown (2012)				The Hollow Crown: The Wars of the Roses (2016)		
Role	Richard II	Henry IV, Part 1	Henry IV, Part 2	Henry V	Henry VI, Part 1	Henry VI, Part 2	Richard III
King Richard II	Ben Whishaw						
King Henry IV Henry Bolingbroke	Rory Kinnear	Jeremy Irons	Jeremy Irons				
Queen Isabella	Clémence Poésy						
John of Gaunt Duke of Lancaster	Patrick Stewart						
Duke of York	David Suchet						
Duchess of York	Lindsay Duncan						
Duke of Aumerle later Duke of York	Tom Hughes			Paterson Joseph			
Earl of Northumberland	David Morrissey	Alun Armstrong	Alun Armstrong				
Lady Northumberland			Niamh Cusack				
Thomas Mowbray Duke of Norfolk	James Purefoy						
King Henry V Prince Hal		Tom Hiddleston	Tom Hiddleston	Tom Hiddleston			
Sir John Falstaff		Simon Russell Beale	Simon Russell Beale	Simon Russell Beale			
Mistress Nell Quickly		Julie Walters	Julie Walters	Julie Walters			
Mistress Doll Tearsheet		Maxine Peake	Maxine Peake	Maxine Peake			
Bardolph		Tom Georgeson	Tom Georgeson	Tom Georgeson			
Ned Poins		David Dawson	David Dawson				
Sir Henry Percy Harry Hotspur		Joe Armstrong					
Earl of Worcester		David Hayman					
Lady Kate Percy		Michelle Dockery	Michelle Dockery				
Sir Edmund Mortimer		Harry Lloyd			Michael Gambon		
Prince John of Lancaster		Henry Faber	Henry Faber				
Humphrey, Duke of Gloucester		Will Attenborough	Will Attenborough		Hugh Bonneville		
Earl of Westmorland		James Laurenson	James Laurenson	James Laurenson			
Ancient Pistol			Paul Ritter	Paul Ritter			
Owen Glendower		Robert Pugh					
Lady Mortimer		Alex Clatworthy					
Justice Robert Shallow			David Bamber				
Lord Chief Justice			Geoffrey Palmer				
Duke of Exeter				Anton Lesser	Anton Lesser	Anton Lesser	Anton Lesser
Captain Fluellen				Owen Teale			
Montjoy				Jérémie Covillault			
King Charles VI of France				Lambert Wilson			
Louis, the Dauphin				Edward Akrout			
Princess Katherine				Mélanie Thierry			
Alice				Geraldine Chaplin			
Chorus				John Hurt			
King Henry VI					Tom Sturridge	Tom Sturridge	Tom Sturridge
Queen Margaret					Sophie Okonedo	Sophie Okonedo	Sophie Okonedo
Eleanor Cobham Duchess of Gloucester					Sally Hawkins		
Richard Plantagenet Duke of York					Adrian Dunbar	Adrian Dunbar	
Cecily Duchess of York					Lucy Robinson	Lucy Robinson	Judi Dench
Bishop of Winchester					Samuel West		
Earl of Warwick					Stanley Townsend	Stanley Townsend	
Earl of Somerset					Ben Miles	Ben Miles	
Duke of Suffolk					Jason Watkins	Jason Watkins	
Lord Talbot					Philip Glenister		
Joan of Arc					Laura Frances-Morgan		
King Richard III Richard Plantagenet						Benedict Cumberbatch	Benedict Cumberbatch
Queen Elizabeth						Keeley Hawes	Keeley Hawes
Edmund Plantagenet						Angus Imrie	
King Edward IV Edward Plantagenet						Geoffrey Streatfeild	Geoffrey Streatfeild
George Plantagenet Duke of Clarence						Sam Troughton	Sam Troughton
Lord Clifford						Kyle Soller	
Earl of Westmorland						Richard Lynch	
Prince Edward						Barney Harris	
Duke of Buckingham						Ben Daniels	Ben Daniels
Queen Anne						Phoebe Fox	Phoebe Fox
Lord Hastings						James Fleet	James Fleet
King Louis XI of France						Andrew Scott	
King Henry VII Earl of Richmond						Andrew Davies	Luke Treadaway
Catesby							Paul Bazely

== Episodes ==
From left to right: Ben Whishaw as Richard II, Jeremy Irons as Henry IV and Tom Hiddleston as Henry V.

=== Series 1 (2012) ===
No. overall	No. in series	Title	Directed by	Written by	Original release date
1	1	"Richard II"	Rupert Goold	William Shakespeare, Rupert Goold & Ben Power	30 June 2012
2	2	"Henry IV, Part 1"	Richard Eyre	William Shakespeare & Richard Eyre	7 July 2012
3	3	"Henry IV, Part 2"	Richard Eyre	William Shakespeare & Richard Eyre	14 July 2012
4	4	"Henry V"	Thea Sharrock	William Shakespeare, Ben Power & Thea Sharrock	21 July 2012

=== Series 2 (2016) ===
No. overall	No. in series	Title	Directed by	Written by	Original release date
5	1	"Henry VI, Part 1"	Dominic Cooke	William Shakespeare, Dominic Cooke & Ben Power	7 May 2016
6	2	"Henry VI, Part 2"	Dominic Cooke	William Shakespeare, Dominic Cooke & Ben Power	14 May 2016
7	3	"Richard III"	Dominic Cooke	William Shakespeare, Dominic Cooke & Ben Power	21 May 2016

== Production ==
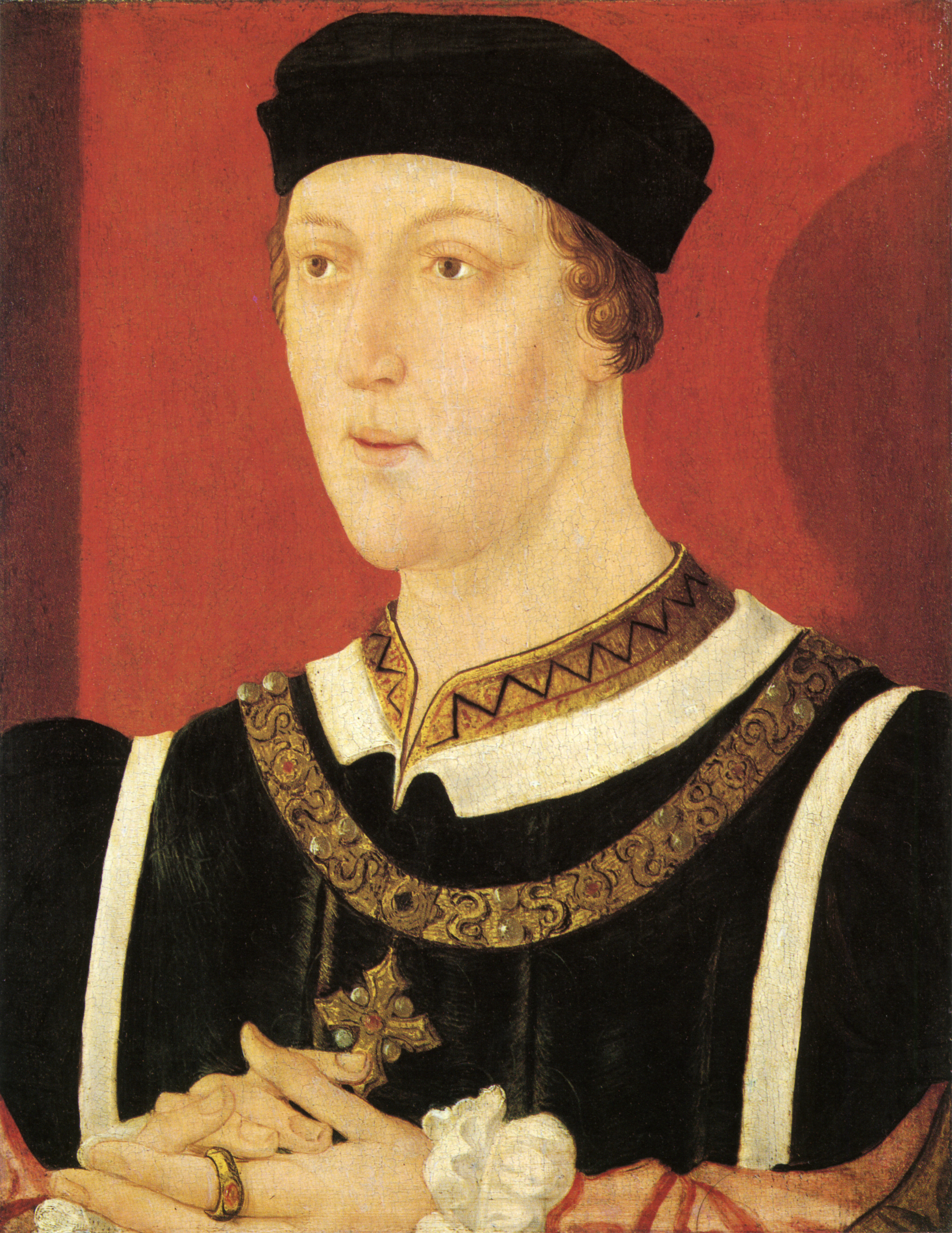
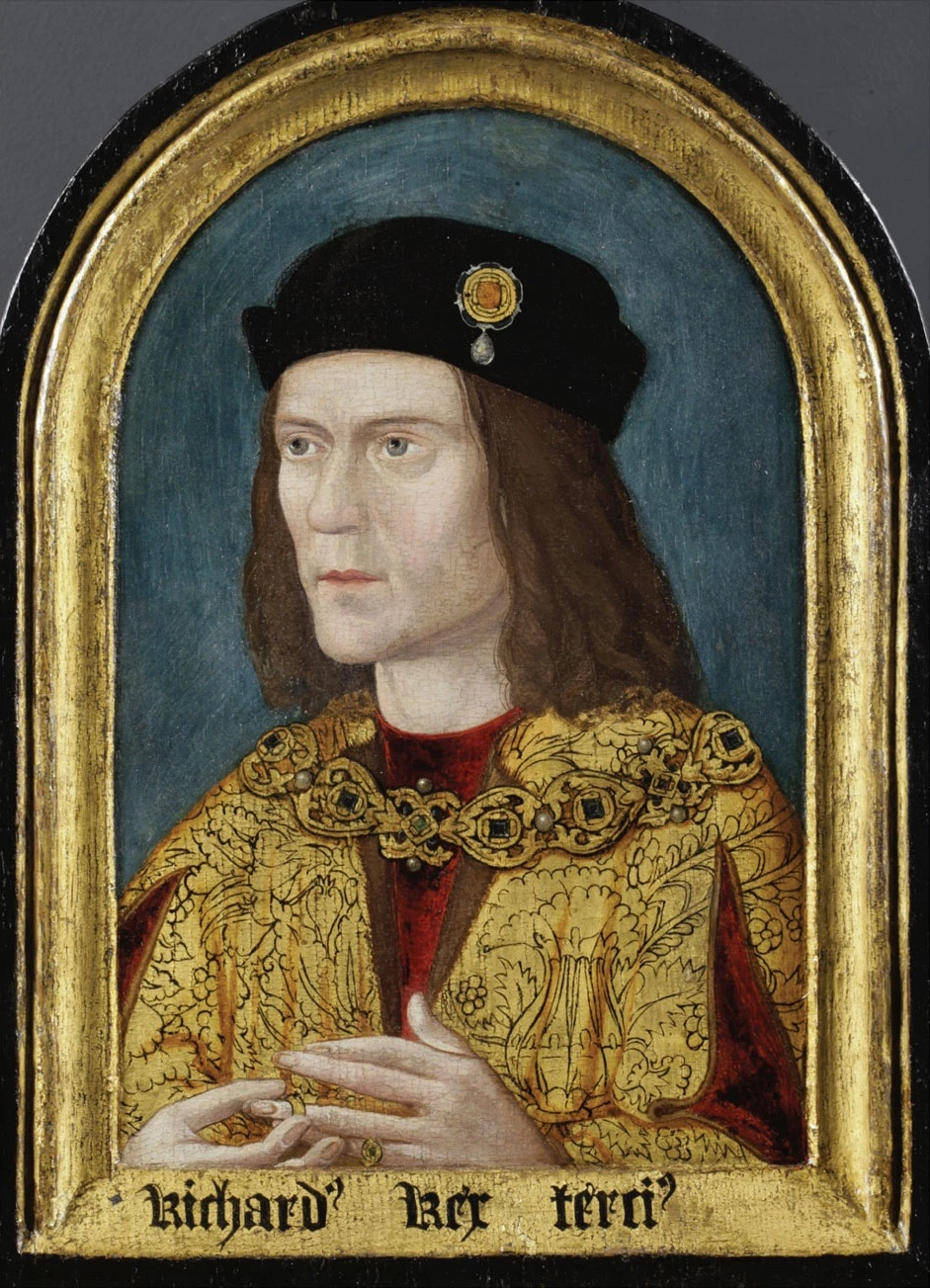
The second series of The Hollow Crown is based on Shakespeare's history plays about Henry VI (left) and Richard III (right).

The BBC scheduled the screening of Shakespeare's history plays as part of the 2012 Cultural Olympiad, a celebration of British culture coinciding with the 2012 Summer Olympics. Sam Mendes signed up as executive producer to adapt all four plays in September 2010. He was joined as executive producer by Pippa Harris (both representing Neal Street Productions), Rupert Ryle-Hodges as producer, Gareth Neame (NBCUniversal), and Ben Stephenson (BBC). Parts of the series were filmed in Kent at Squerryes Court and Penshurst Place.

The concluding series of plays were produced in 2015 by the same team that made the first series and were directed by Dominic Cooke. Richard III was played by Benedict Cumberbatch. Executive producer Pippa Harris stated, "The critical and audience reaction to The Hollow Crown series set the bar high for Shakespeare on screen, and Neal Street (Productions) is delighted to be making the concluding part of this great history cycle. By filming the Henry VI plays as well as Richard III, we will allow viewers to fully appreciate how such a monstrous tyrant could find his way to power, bringing even more weight and depth to this iconic character." The production returned to Kent for The Wars of the Roses, filming at Dover Castle, Leeds Castle and Penshurst Place.

=== Adaptation ===
The first series is largely faithful to the plays, although the text is abridged and lines are occasionally cut. The second series notably compresses the three-part Henry VI into two episodes. Significant scenes involving Talbot and Joan of Arc are cut and Jack Cade's Rebellion is not included. Many elements from the Suffolk part are incorporated into the character of Somerset. While the text does not directly specify which Duke of Exeter is depicted in Henry VI, Part 3, it is widely assumed to be Henry Holland, 3rd Duke of Exeter given the play's setting between 1445 and 1471.

== Release ==
The first four plays aired on consecutive Saturday evenings on BBC Two between 30 June and 21 July 2012. The start time of Henry IV, Part 1 on 7 July was delayed by an hour because of coverage of the 2012 Wimbledon Championships, and the play was shown a second time the following evening on BBC Four. The plays were shown in the United States from 20 September to 11 October 2013 as part of the PBS Great Performances series.

All four plays were shown again on consecutive evenings on BBC Four in April 2016 as part of the BBC Shakespeare Festival commemorating the 400th anniversary of the playwright's death. The second series of plays aired on consecutive Saturday evenings on BBC Two commencing Saturday 7 May 2016.

== Home media ==
The overseas and DVD rights for The Hollow Crown series are owned by NBC Universal. A Region 2 DVD set of the four films was released on 1 October 2012. A Region 1 DVD set was released on 17 September 2013. A 2-disc DVD set of The Wars of the Roses was released on 20 June 2016.

The original music soundtrack from The Hollow Crown: The Wars of the Roses composed by Dan Jones was released on the Wave Theory Records label in June 2016 and performed by the BBC National Orchestra of Wales.

== Reception ==
=== Critical response ===
==== Series 1 ====
On the review aggregator website Rotten Tomatoes, 96% of 23 critics' reviews are positive. The website's consensus reads: "The Hollow Crown summons some of Britain's most exemplary acting talent and gorgeously crafted production values to enliven the Swan of Avon's immortal words with an energetic panache fit for the 21st Century." On Metacritic, the series has a weighted average score of 89 out of 100 based on 11 critics indicating "universal acclaim".

==== Series 2 ====
On the review aggregator website Rotten Tomatoes, 100% of 19 critics' reviews are positive. The website's consensus reads: "The Hollow Crown deftly demonstrates that even the Bard's most obscure work can be sumptuous appointment viewing -- saving Benedict Cumberbatch's riveting incarnation of Richard III as a parting treat." On Metacritic, the series has a weighted average score of 84 out of 100 based on 4 critics indicating "universal acclaim". Mike Hughes of The Salinas Californian wrote, "Amazing TV – perfectly filmed."

=== Accolades ===
==== Series 1 ====
Award	Result	Category	Recipient	Ref.
Music & Sound Awards 2013	Nominated	Sound Design (TV Programme)	The Hollow Crown	
South Bank Sky Arts Awards 2013	Nominated	Best TV Drama	The Hollow Crown	
South Bank Sky Arts Awards 2013	Won	Times Breakthrough	Tom Hiddleston	
Broadcasting Press Guild 2013	Won	Best Single Drama	The Hollow Crown	
Broadcasting Press Guild 2013	Nominated	Best Actor	Ben Whishaw	
BAFTA Television Awards 2013	Won	Best Leading Actor (Richard II)	Ben Whishaw	
BAFTA Television Awards 2013	Won	Best Supporting Actor	Simon Russell Beale (Henry IV Part 2)	
BAFTA Television Awards 2013	Nominated	Best Single Drama	Richard II	
RTS Programme Awards 2013	Won	Single Drama	Richard II	
BAFTA Craft Awards 2013	Won	Best Original Television Music	Stephen Warbeck (Henry IV)	
BAFTA Craft Awards 2013	Won	Best Sound (Fiction)	Tim Fraser, Adrian Rhodes, Keith Marriner (Richard II)	
BAFTA Craft Awards 2013	Nominated	Best Costume Design	Odile Dicks-Mireaux (Richard II)	
British Society of Cinematographers	Nominated	Best Cinematography in a Television Drama	Ben Smithard	
4th Critics' Choice Television Awards	Nominated	Best Miniseries	The Hollow Crown	

==== Series 2 ====
Award	Result	Category	Recipient	Ref.
BAFTA Television Awards 2017	Nominated	Best Leading Actor	Benedict Cumberbatch	
BAFTA Television Awards 2017	Nominated	Best Mini-Series	The Hollow Crown: The Wars of the Roses	
BAFTA Television Craft Awards 2017	Nominated	Best Costume Design	Nigel Egerton (Richard III)	
