= Ben Power =

British dramaturg and playwright

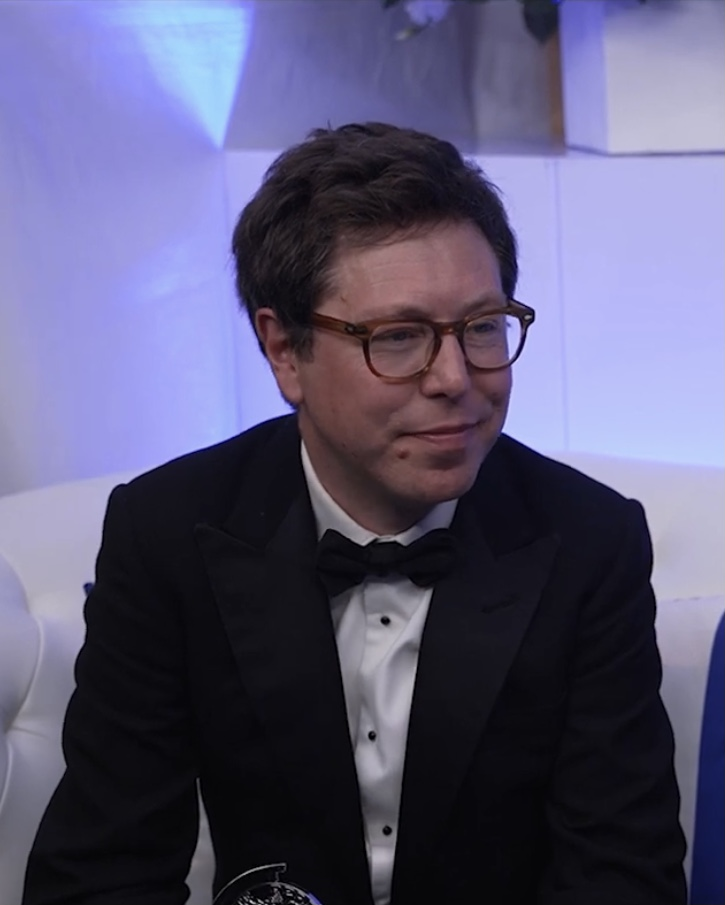
- Power at the 75th Tony Awards in 2022
- Education: University of Cambridge

Ben Power is a British dramaturg, playwright and screenwriter. Since 2010 he has primarily worked at the National Theatre.

He adapted Stefano Massini's play The Lehman Trilogy for the National Theatre in 2018. It transferred to the West End and Broadway, where it won the 2022 Tony Award for Best Play.

His screenplays include the Netflix adaptation of Robert Harris (novelist)' Munich - The Edge of War and several parts of the BBC Shakespeare series The Hollow Crown (TV series). His screen adaptation of Jo Nesbo’s Blood on Snow, directed by Cary Fukunaga will be released in 2027.

He studied English at Cambridge University. Before joining the National Theatre he worked with Rupert Goold as Associate Director of Headlong Theatre. He was dramaturg and Literary Associate on A Disappearing Number for Complicité, which won the 2007 Evening Standard, Critics’ Circle and Olivier awards for Best Play.

In 2011 he wrote the adaptation of Henrik Ibsen's epic Emperor and Galilean for the National Theatre. Between 2013 and 2016 he oversaw the National Theatre's temporary space, The Shed. His new version of Euripides' Medea, starring Helen McCrory in the eponymous role, ran at the National Theatre from July to September 2014.

In 2015 he was appointed Deputy Artistic Director of the National Theatre; the role had not previously existed. In 2016 he condensed three works by D. H. Lawrence into a single play, presented as Husbands and Sons in the National's Dorfman theatre. In 2024 he adapted Dickens' Our Mutual Friend into London Tide, a play with songs by PJ Harvey. It ran in the Lyttelton Theatre, directed by Ian Rickson.
