= Stockport College =

College in Greater Manchester, England

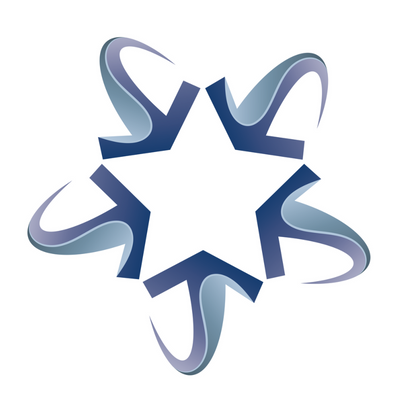
- Stockport, Greater Manchester; England, United Kingdom

Information
- Type: Further education and Higher education
- Established: 1960s (Current name by merger in April 2018)
- Local authority: Stockport Metropolitan Borough Council
- Gender: Mixed
- Campuses: Stockport Town Centre Campus
- Part of: Trafford College Group
- Website: stockport.ac.uk

Listed Building – Grade II
- Official name: Stockport College of Further and Higher Education Annexe
- Designated: 3 April 2008
- Reference no.: 1392504

Stockport College is a medium-sized educational institute in Stockport, Greater Manchester, England. It provides further education and higher education to those aged 16 and over. It also offers educational opportunities for school leavers, adults, and businesses.

The college has academic and vocational courses from pre-GCSE to degree level. It is a provider of post-16 education and training in Stockport and a centre for a range of specialist courses.

Among its facilities the college has a theatre where drama and performing arts are taught; in November 1999 it was named the Peter Barkworth Theatre after the English actor Peter Barkworth (1929–2006).

== Town centre campus ==
The town centre campus is the original site of Stockport College of Further and Higher Education (53°24′16″N 2°09′31″W) and much of the campus dates back to the 1960s. The complete redevelopment of this site and some surrounding buildings was due for completion in 2011 to create a new educational campus for the Metropolitan Borough of Stockport. The total project value was estimated at approximately £100 million from various sources. It included the closure and selling off of the Heaton Moor Campus (53°25′44″N 2°11′02″W), inherited from the merger with North Area College in 2006. A town centre campus redevelopment project was set to begin in 2018.

== Trafford College Group ==
On 4 April 2018, Stockport College and Trafford College announced the completion of their merger. As of November 2022, the Trafford College Group is the corporation name for the provider which has over 11,000 students and apprentices and a combined turnover of around £39 million.

Stockport College and Trafford College retained their existing names and campus sites following the merger.

== Notable alumni ==
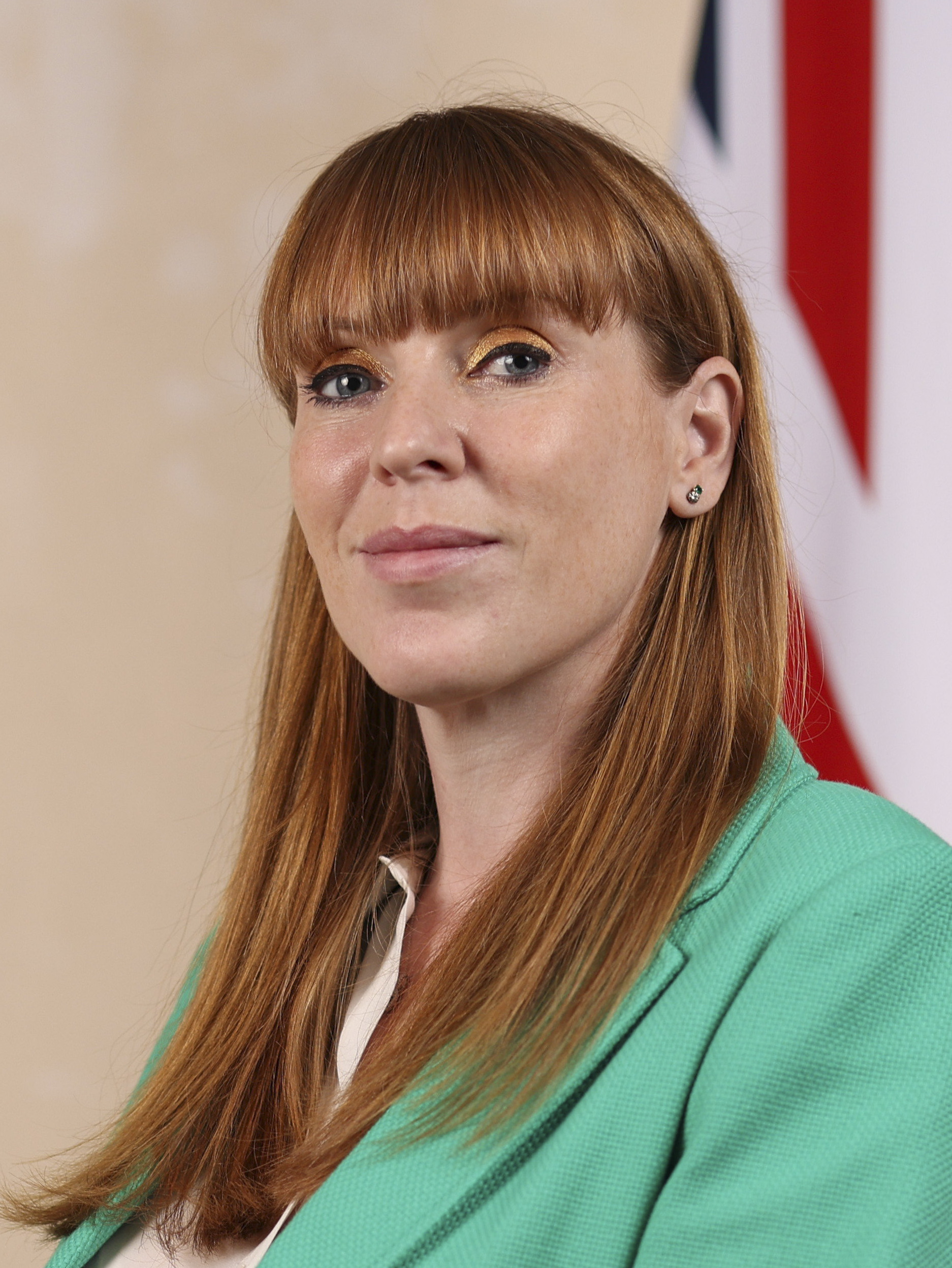
Angela Rayner

- Lee Boardman (born 1972), British actor and narrator
- Adam Gillen (born 1985), British actor actor, best known for his role as Liam Conroy in the ITV hit series Benidorm
- Sarah Harding (1981–2021), English singer, model, and actress, associated with the pop girl group Girls Aloud
- Alan Lowndes (1921–1978), British painter known primarily for his scenes of northern life
- Luthfur Rahman (born 1976), British former local councillor, who served as the deputy leader of Manchester City Council from 2021 to 2024
- Angela Rayner (born 1980), Deputy Prime Minister (2024–2025) and Deputy Leader of the Labour Party (2020–2025), politician (Member of Parliament), former care worker and trade unionist
- Daniel Rigby (born 1982), English actor and comedian, who received a BAFTA TV Award for his leading role as Eric Morecambe in the 2011 BBC television film Eric and Ernie

== See also ==
- Listed buildings in Stockport
