= 2011 British Academy Television Awards =

UK television awards ceremony

- Date: 22 May 2011
- Site: Grosvenor House Hotel
- Hosted by: Graham Norton

Highlights
- Best Comedy Series: Harry & Paul
- Best Drama: Sherlock
- Best Actor: Daniel Rigby; Eric and Ernie
- Best Actress: Vicky McClure; This Is England '86
- Best Comedy Performance: Jo Brand Getting On; Steve Coogan The Trip
- Most awards: Sherlock (2)
- Most nominations: Misfits/Sherlock (4)

Television coverage
- Channel: BBC One
- Ratings: 5.4 million

The 2011 British Academy Television Awards were held on 22 May 2011. The nominations were announced on 26 April. Graham Norton hosted the ceremony.

== Nominations ==
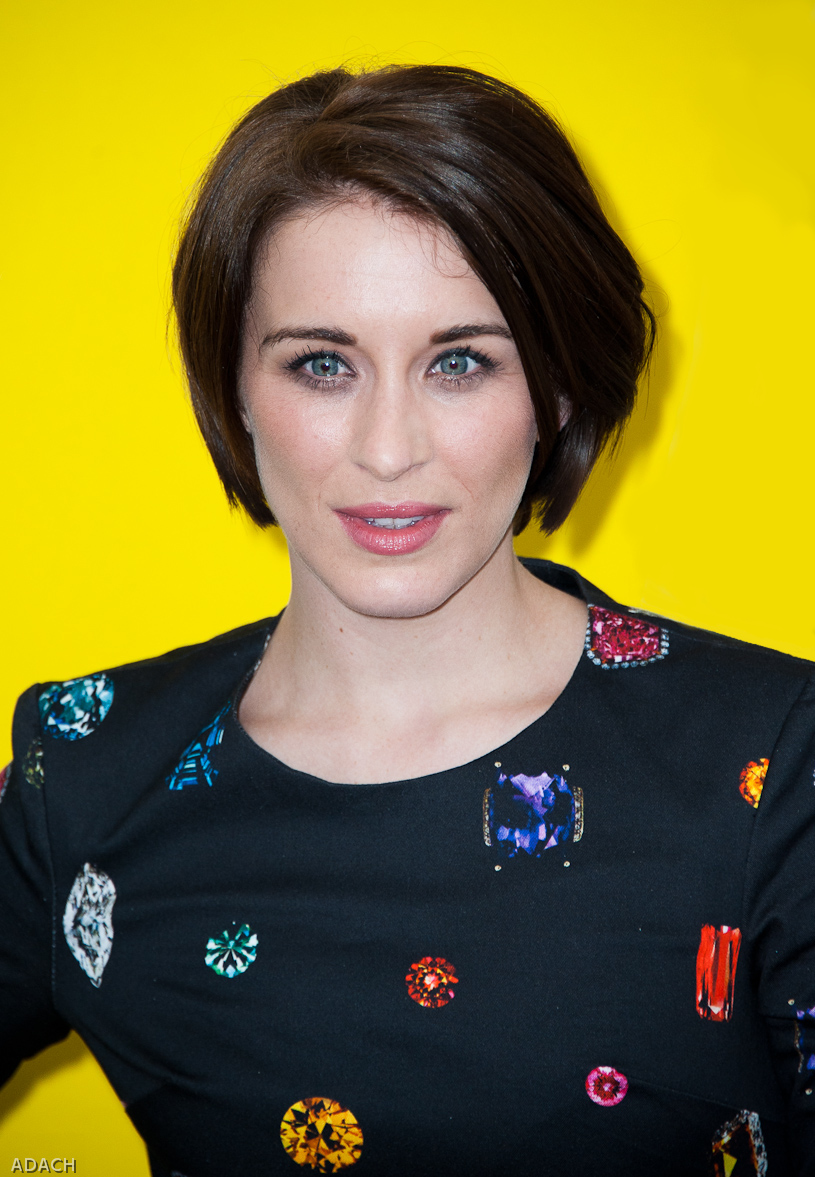
Vicky McClure, Best Actress winner

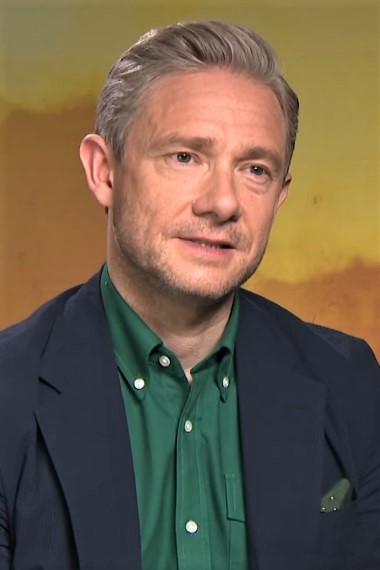
Martin Freeman, Best Supporting Actor winner

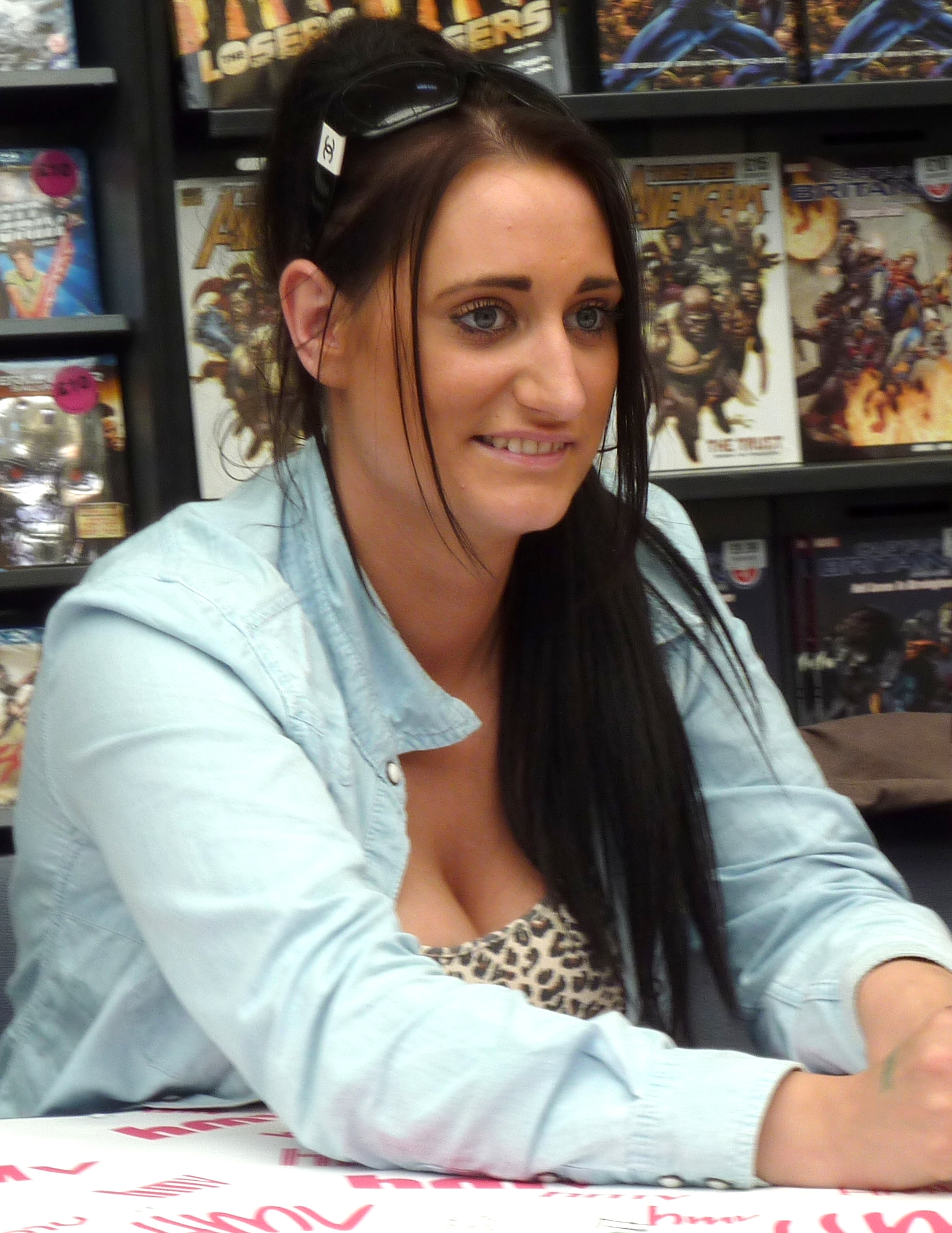
Lauren Socha, Best Supporting Actress winner

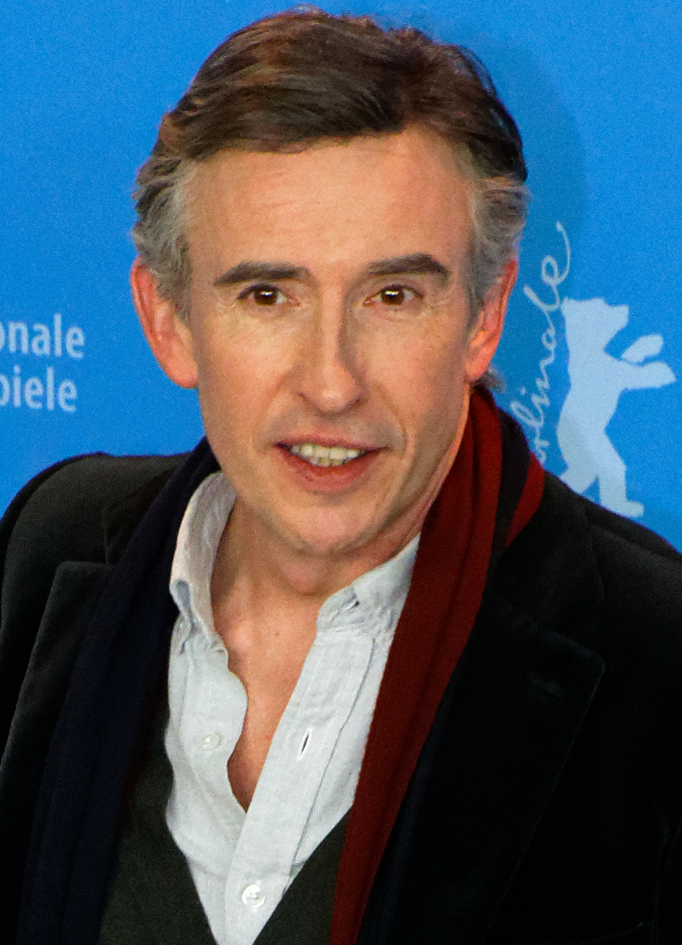
Steve Coogan, Best Male Comedy Performance winner

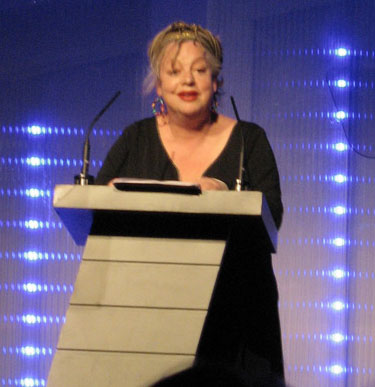
Jo Brand, Best Female Comedy Performance Winner

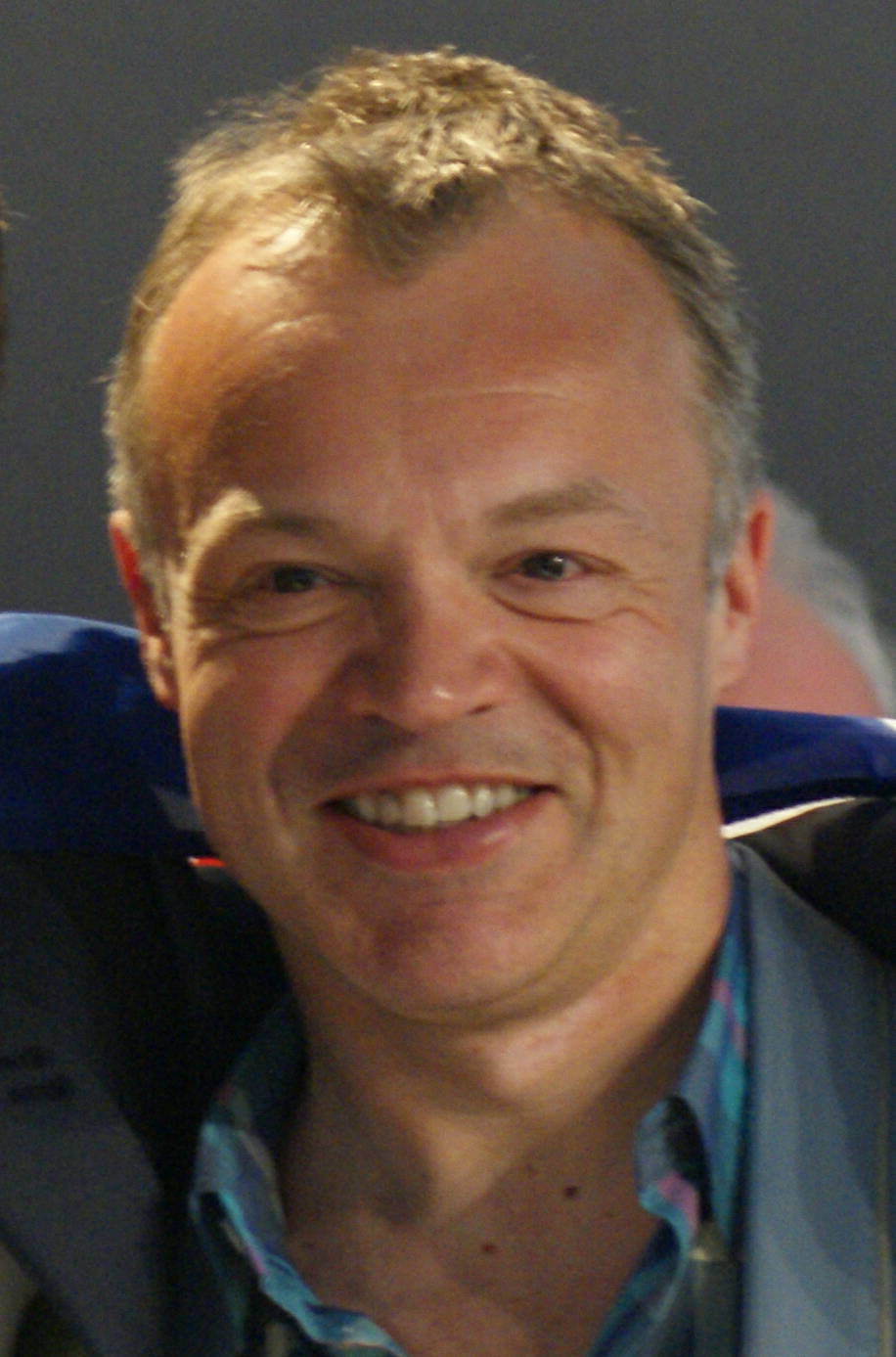
Graham Norton, Best Entertainment Performance winners

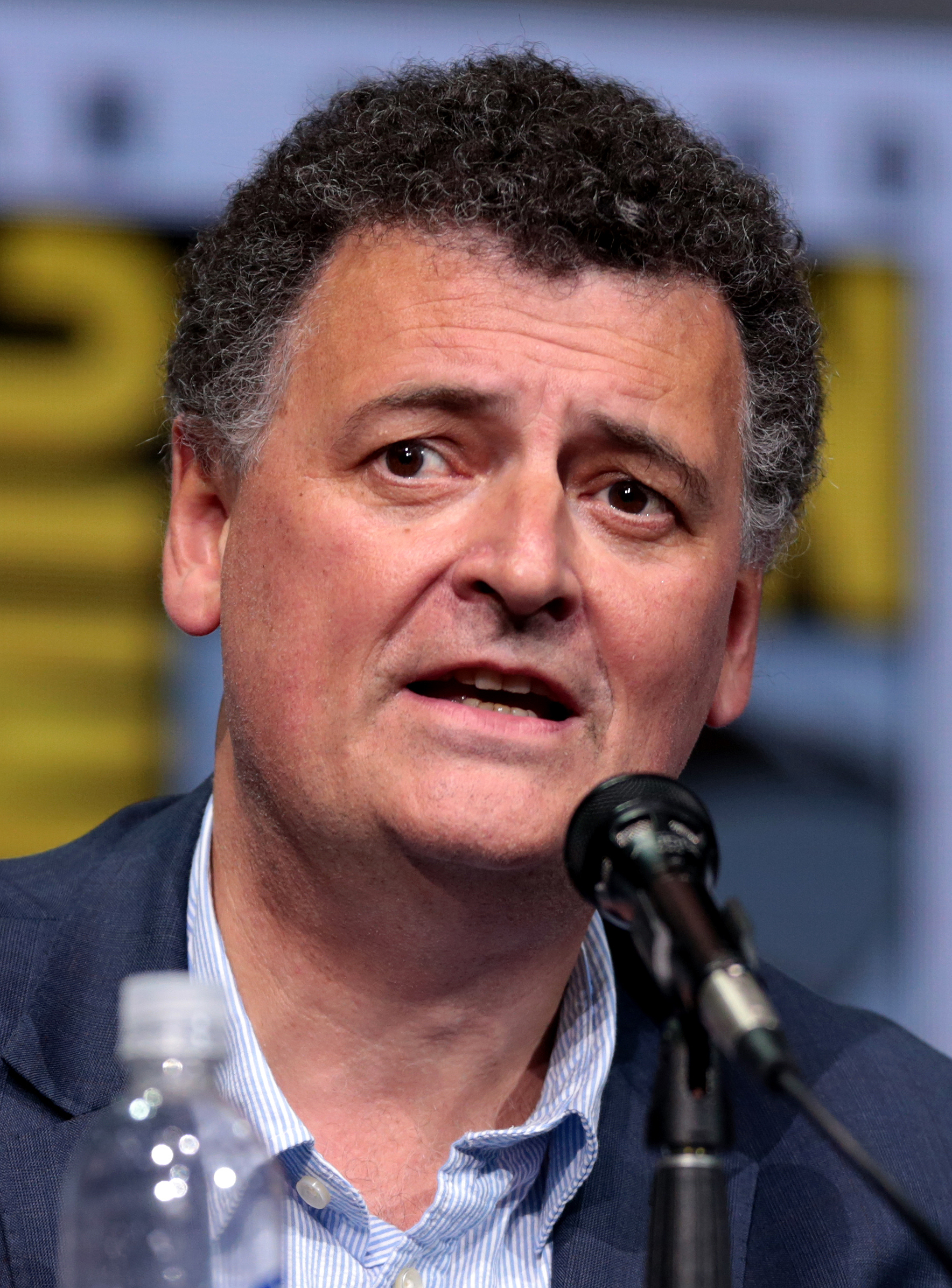
Steven Moffat, co-creator of Best Drama Series winner, Sherlock

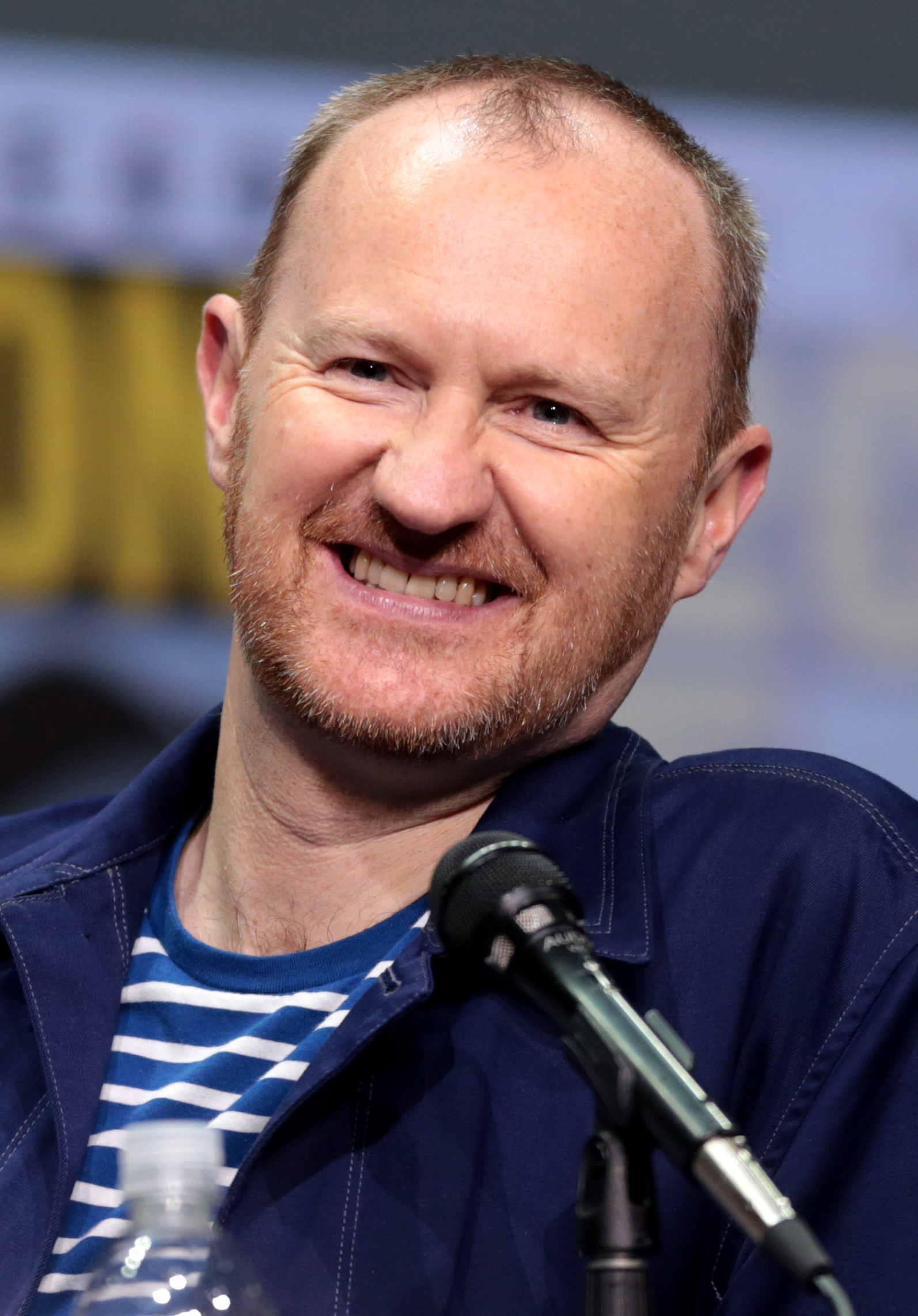
Mark Gatiss, Co-creator of Best Drama Series winner, Sherlock

Winners are listed first and emboldened.

| Best Actor | Best Actress |
|---|---|
| Daniel Rigby – Eric and Ernie as Eric Morecambe (BBC Two); Jim Broadbent – Any Human Heart as Logan Mountstuart (Channel 4); Benedict Cumberbatch – Sherlock as Sherlock Holmes (BBC One); Matt Smith – Doctor Who as The Doctor (BBC One) | Vicky McClure – This Is England '86 as Lorraine "Lol" Jenkins (Channel 4); Anna Maxwell Martin – South Riding as Sarah Burton (BBC One); Natalie Press – Five Daughters as Paula Clennell (BBC One); Juliet Stevenson – Accused : Helen's Story as Helen Ryland (BBC One) |
| Best Supporting Actor | Best Supporting Actress |
| Martin Freeman – Sherlock as John Watson (BBC One); Brendan Coyle – Downton Abbey as John Bates (ITV1); Johnny Harris – This Is England '86 as Michael "Mick" Jenkins (Channel 4); Robert Sheehan – Misfits as Nathan Young (E4) | Lauren Socha – Misfits as Kelly Bailey (E4); Gillian Anderson – Any Human Heart as Wallis, Duchess of Windsor (Channel 4); Lynda Baron – The Road to Coronation Street as Violet Carson (BBC Four); Jessie Wallace – The Road to Coronation Street as Pat Phoenix (BBC Four) |
| Best Male Comedy Performance | Best Female Comedy Performance |
| Steve Coogan – The Trip as Steve Coogan (BBC Two); James Buckley – The Inbetweeners as Jay Cartwright (E4); Tom Hollander – Rev. as Adam Smallbone (BBC Two); David Mitchell – Peep Show as Mark Corrigan (Channel 4) | Jo Brand – Getting On as Kim Wilde (BBC Four); Dawn French – Roger and Val Have Just Got In as Val Stevenson (BBC Two); Miranda Hart – Miranda as Miranda (BBC Two); Katherine Parkinson – The IT Crowd as Jen Barber (Channel 4) |
| Best Entertainment Performance | Best Single Drama |
| Graham Norton – The Graham Norton Show (BBC One); Rob Brydon – The Rob Brydon Show (BBC Two); Stephen Fry – QI (BBC Two); Harry Hill – Harry Hill's TV Burp (ITV1) | The Road to Coronation Street (BBC Four); Eric and Ernie (BBC Two); I Am Slave (Channel 4); The Special Relationship (BBC Two) |
| Best Drama Serial | Best Drama Series |
| Any Human Heart (Channel 4); Mad Dogs (Sky1); The Sinking of the Laconia (BBC Two); The Promise (Channel 4) | Sherlock (BBC One); Being Human (BBC Three); Downton Abbey (ITV1); Misfits (E4) |
| Best Soap and Continuing Drama | Best International Programme |
| EastEnders (BBC One); Casualty (BBC One); Coronation Street (ITV1); Waterloo Road (BBC One) | The Killing (DR1/BBC Four); Boardwalk Empire (HBO/Sky Atlantic); Glee (Fox/E4); Mad Men (AMC/BBC Four) |
| Best Factual Series or Strand | Best Specialist Factual |
| Welcome to Lagos (BBC Two); Coppers (Channel 4); One Born Every Minute (Channel 4); The Young Ones (BBC One) | Flying Monsters (Sky 3D); Alan Bennett and the Habit of Art (The Making Of) (More4); Human Planet (BBC One); Pompeii: Life and Death in a Roman Town (BBC Two) |
| Best Single Documentary | Best Feature |
| Between Life and Death (BBC One); The Dancing Boys of Afghanistan (More4); Pink Saris (More4); Scenes From a Teenage Killing (BBC Four) | Hugh's Fish Fight (Channel 4); Come Dine with Me (Channel 4); Mary Queen of Shops (BBC Two); Pineapple Dance Studios (Sky1) |
| Best New Media | Best Current Affairs |
| Wallace and Gromit's World of Invention (BBC One); BBC Lab UK/Brain Test Britain (BBC); Malcolm Tucker: The Missing Phone (BBC); Misfits (E4) | Zimbabwe's Forgotten Children (BBC Four); Kid's in Care – (Panorama) (BBC One); Lost Girl's of South Africa (Dispatches) (Channel 4); Secret Iraq (BBC Two) |
| Best News Coverage | Best Sport |
| ITV News at Ten: "The Cumbria Murders" (ITV1); BBC News at Ten: "Handover of Power" (BBC One/BBC News); Channel 4 News: "From Chile’s Ecstasy to Congo’s Agony" (Channel 4); Sky News: "Egypt Crisis" (Sky News) | F1 - The 2010 Abu Dhabi Grand Prix (BBC One/BBC Sport); 6 Nations – England v Wales (BBC One/BBC Sport); 2010 FA Cup Final (ITV/ITV Sport); Wimbledon 2010 (BBC One/BBC Sport) |
| Best Entertainment Programme | Best Scripted Comedy |
| The Cube (ITV1); The Graham Norton Show (BBC One); Have I Got News For You (BBC One); The X Factor (ITV1) | Rev. (BBC Two); Mrs. Brown's Boys (BBC One); Peep Show (Channel 4); The Trip (BBC Two) |
| Best Comedy and Comedy Entertainment Programme | YouTube Audience Award |
| Harry & Paul (BBC Two); Catherine Tate’s Little Crackers (Sky1); Come Fly With Me (BBC One); Facejacker (Channel 4) | The Only Way is Essex (ITV2); Big Fat Gypsy Weddings (Channel 4); Downton Abbey (ITV1); The Killing (DR1/BBC Four); Miranda (BBC Two); Sherlock (BBC One) |
| BAFTA Fellowship Award | BAFTA Special Award |
| Sir Trevor McDonald | Peter Bennett-Jones |

== Programmes with multiple nominations ==
Programmes that received multiple nominations
| Nominations | Programme |
|---|---|
| 4 | Misfits |
| 4 | Sherlock |
| 3 | Any Human Heart |
| 3 | Downton Abbey |
| 3 | The Road to Coronation Street |
| 3 | This Is England '86 |
| 2 | Eric and Ernie |
| 2 | The Graham Norton Show |
| 2 | The Killing |
| 2 | Miranda |
| 2 | Peep Show |
| 2 | Rev. |
| 2 | The Trip |

Networks that received multiple nominations
| Nominations | Network |
|---|---|
| 25 | BBC One |
| 18 | Channel 4 |
| 18 | BBC Two |
| 9 | BBC Four |
| 8 | ITV1 |
| 6 | E4 |
| 3 | BBC Sport |
| 3 | More4 |
| 3 | Sky1 |
| 2 | DR1 |

== In Memoriam ==
- TP McKenna
- Mary Malcolm
- Alan Plater
- Margaret John
- Edward Hardwicke
- Trevor Bannister
- Gilly Coman
- Douglas Argent
- Keith Fordyce
- Claire Rayner
- Alfred Burke
- John Sullivan
- Chris Sievey
- Brian Hanrahan
- Richard Holmes
- Geoffrey Hutchings
- Tom Bosley
- Simon MacCorkindale
- Anthony Howard
- Graham Crowden
- Gary Coleman
- Henry Cooper
- Louis Marks
- Ken Taylor
- Tim Hetherington
- Paul Marcus
- Elisabeth Sladen
