= Daniel Rigby =

English actor and comedian (born 1982)

- Born: 6 December 1982 (age 43); England
- Education: Cheadle Hulme School; Royal Academy of Dramatic Art
- Occupations: Actor; comedian
- Years active: 2004–present

Daniel Rigby (born 6 December 1982) is an English actor and comedian. He received a BAFTA TV Award for his leading role as Eric Morecambe in the 2011 BBC television film Eric and Ernie.

== Early life and education ==
Daniel Rigby was born in 1982. He is the cousin of Blossoms frontman Tom Ogden.

He attended Cheadle Hulme School, then went on to study performing arts at Stockport College before training at the Royal Academy of Dramatic Art.

== Career ==
Rigby has worked as a stand-up comedian, having appeared at the Latitude Festival, won the 2007 Laughing Horse New Act of the Year, and been a nominee for winner of the 2007 So You Think You're Funny competition.

In 2007, he moved to television roles with the BBC period drama Lilies.

In 2011, Rigby won the British Academy Television Award for Best Actor for his performance as the late comedian Eric Morecambe in Eric and Ernie, beating both Matt Smith and Benedict Cumberbatch for their roles as the Doctor and Sherlock Holmes, respectively. From 2011 until 2014, Rigby voiced Copenhagen in three series of the BBC Radio 4 comedy Warhorses of Letters alongside Stephen Fry. He performed in Tom Basden's Holes at the Arcola Theatre in London from July to August 2014 alongside Mathew Baynton.

In 2015, he narrated the reboot of the BBC children's television series Teletubbies.

In March 2017, he won the best actor award at the 2016 Manchester Theatre Awards for his performance as Alan Turing in Breaking the Code at the Royal Exchange, Manchester.

In 2019, he voiced the title role in the BBC Radio 4 sitcom ReincarNathan, alongside Diane Morgan and Josh Widdicombe.

In 2021, Rigby wrote and performed the highly rated audiobook novel Isaac Steele and the Forever Man.

In 2022 and 2023, Rigby starred as The Maniac in Tom Basden's adaptation of Dario Fo's Accidental Death of an Anarchist, with runs in Sheffield and London.

In 2024, he appeared as Jack Trotter in the Disney+ show Renegade Nell.

Rigby will be portraying Vernon Dursley in the forthcoming HBO Harry Potter series.

== Filmography ==
Key
†	Denotes projects that have not yet been released

=== Film ===
Year	Title	Role	Notes
2006	Flyboys	Ives	
2021	The Electrical Life of Louis Wain	Bendigo	
2026	Cold Storage	Anthony	

=== Television ===
Year	Title	Role	Notes
2007	Lilies	Billy Moss	7 episodes
2008	Spooks: Code 9	David	Episode: "Hackers"
2009	The Street	James	Episode: "Past Life"
2011	Ideal	Hugh	Episode: "The Love"
2011	Eric and Ernie	Eric Morecambe	BAFTA TV Award for Best Actor
2012	Cardinal Burns	Various	Episode #1.6
2012	Comedy Showcase	Yannick Montagu	Episode: "The Function Room"
2013	Agatha Christie's Marple	Canon Prescott	Episode: "A Caribbean Mystery"
2013	Black Mirror	Jamie Salter / Waldo	Episode: "The Waldo Moment"
2013–2014	Big School	Mr. Luke Martin	9 episodes
2014	From There to Here	Charlie	3 episodes
2014	That Day We Sang	Mr. Kirkby	Television film
2015	Undercover	Chris	6 episodes
2015–2018	Teletubbies	Narrator	Children's television series
2016	Jericho	Charles Blackwood	8 episodes
2016–2018	Flowers	Donald	12 episodes
2017	Gap Year	Jotty	Episode: "Kuala Lumpur: The Expats"
2017–2018	Sick Note	Officer Hayward	10 episodes
2018	Watership Down	Dandelion	4 episodes
2018	Plebs	Nero	Episode: "The Bathhouse"
2019	Timewasters	Martin	Episode: "19:58"
2019	GameFace	David Chaplin	Episode: "Gritty"
2019	Defending the Guilty	Phillip	Episode #1.5
2020	Jack and the Beanstalk: After Ever After	Baker	Television film
2021	Landscapers	Tony Collier	4 episodes
2021	Hansel & Gretel: After Ever After	Jester	Television film
2022	The Witchfinder	Hebble	6 episodes
2023	Tom Jones	Partridge	3 episodes
2024	Renegade Nell	Jack Trotter	2 episodes
2025	I, Jack Wright	John Wright	6 episodes
2026	Blade Runner 2099 †	TBA	Post-production
2026–present	Harry Potter †	Vernon Dursley	TV Series

=== Stage ===
Year	Title	Role	Notes
2004	Hamlet	King	Thelma Holt Productions
2005	A Midsummer Night's Dream	Demetrius/Moonshine	Orchestra of the Age of Enlightenment
2005	The Burial at Thebes	Haemon	Nottingham Playhouse
2006	The White Album	Miles	Nottingham Playhouse
2009	The Mothwokfantastic	Himself	Performed at the Edinburgh Fringe Festival
2009	Beyond The Front Line	Welsh soldier (Private Vespa)	The Lowry, Salford
2009	The Music Show		Performed at Just for Laughs festival in Montreal, Quebec, Canada
2010	Afterbirth	Himself	Performed at the Edinburgh Fringe Festival
2010	The Count of Monte Cristo	Edmond Dantès	West Yorkshire Playhouse, Leeds
2011	One Man, Two Guvnors	Alan Dangle	Royal National Theatre (Lyttelton Theatre); UK tour; Adelphi Theatre; Music Box Theatre, Broadway
2013	Daniel Rigby: Berk in Progress	Himself	Performed at the Edinburgh Fringe Festival
2014	Holes	Ian	Arcola Theatre, Dalston, London
2016	Breaking the Code	Alan Turing	Royal Exchange Theatre, Manchester
2017	Twelfth Night	Sir Andrew Aguecheek	Royal National Theatre (Olivier Theatre)
2018	Frost/Nixon	David Frost	Crucible Theatre, Sheffield
2018	A Midsummer Night's Dream	Bottom	Crucible Theatre, Sheffield
2022–2023	Accidental Death of an Anarchist	The Maniac	Crucible Theatre, Sheffield, transferred to Lyric Theatre, Hammersmith and subsequently to Theatre Royal, Haymarket
2023–2024	The Witches	Mr Stringer	Royal National Theatre (Olivier Theatre)
