= British Academy Television Award for Best Actor =

Annual award for performance in British TV

British Academy Television Award
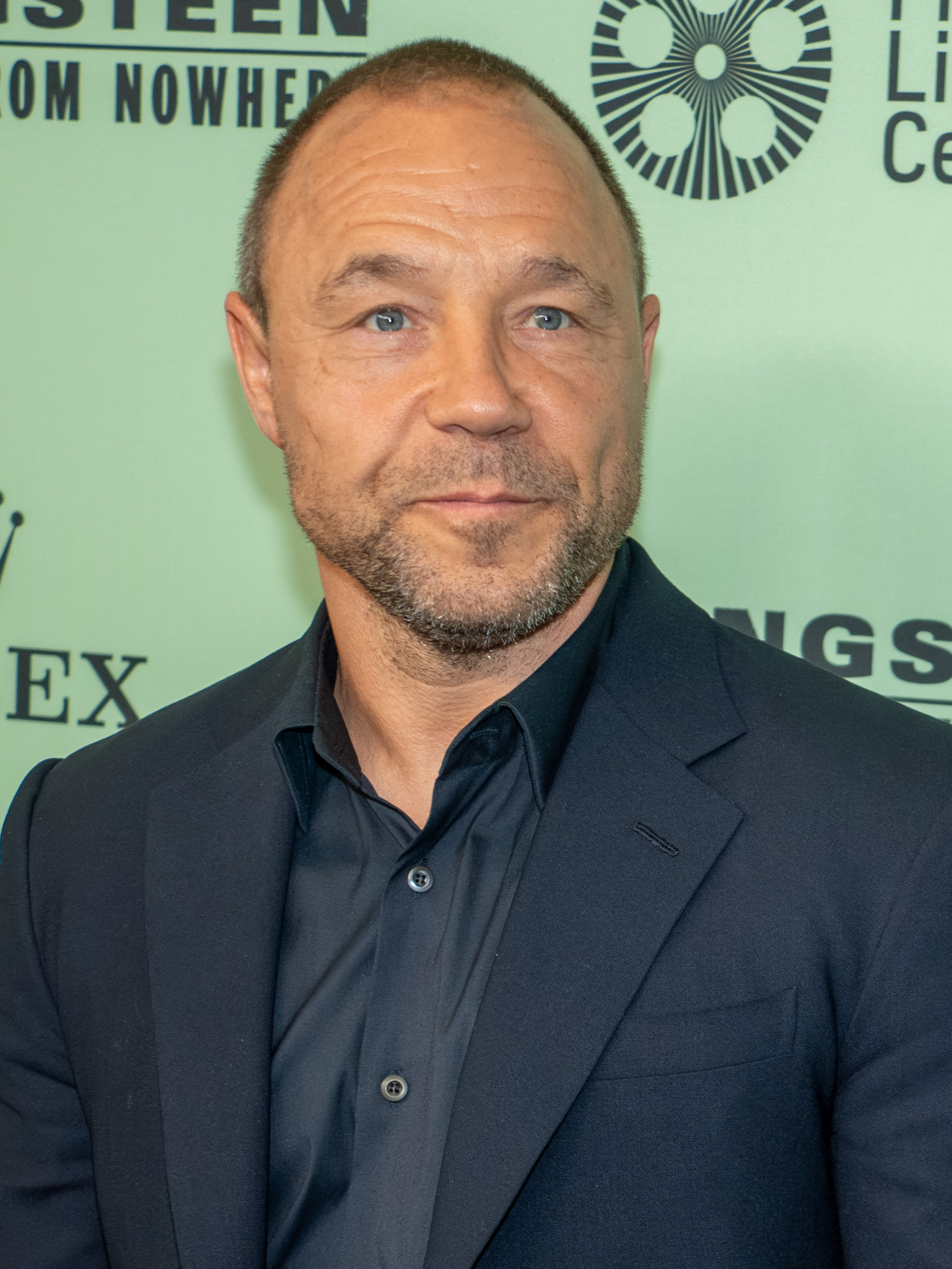
- 2026 winner Stephen Graham
- Country: United Kingdom
- Presented by: British Academy of Film and Television Arts
- First award: 1955
- Currently held by: Stephen Graham for Adolescence (2026)

Highlights
- Most wins: Michael Gambon (4)
- Website: http://www.bafta.org/

This is a list of the British Academy Television Awards for Best Actor. The Best Actor award was initially given as an "individual honour", without credit to a particular performance, until 1962, when Rupert Davies won for his performance in Maigret.

Since 1970, nominees have been announced in addition to the winner. The Actor category was split into Leading Actor and Supporting Actor starting in 2010.

Michael Gambon holds the record of most wins in this category with four, including three consecutive wins, followed by Robbie Coltrane with three, all of them also being consecutive. Additionally, Alan Badel, Peter Barkworth, Sean Bean, Alec Guinness, Mark Rylance, John Thaw, and Ben Whishaw, all have received the award twice. Benedict Cumberbatch has received the most nominations for this award with six, followed by Coltrane with five.

== Winners and nominees ==
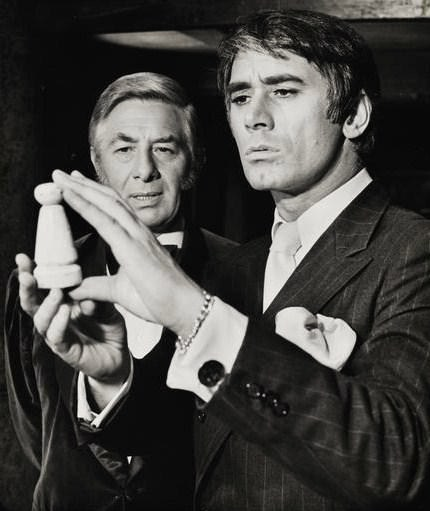
Paul Rogers (left) was the first recipient of the award.

=== 1950s ===
Year	Actor
1955
1955	Paul Rogers
1956
1956	Peter Cushing
1957
1957	Michael Gough
1958
1958	Michael Hordern
1959
1959	Donald Pleasence

=== 1960s ===
Rupert Davies was the first actor to receive this award for a specific work, winning for Maigret.

Year	Actors	Work
1960
1960	Patrick McGoohan	
1961
1961	Lee Montague	
1962
1962	Rupert Davies	Maigret
1963
1963	Harry H. Corbett	Steptoe and Son
1964
1964	Alan Badel	
1965
1965	Patrick Wymark	
1966
1966	Alan Badel	The Count of Monte Cristo; Meeting Point; A Couple of Dry Martinis; Not So Much a Programme, More a Way of Life; Famous Gossips
1966	Richard Briers	Simon and Laura; Marriage Lines; Points of View; Present Laughter - Excerpt; Charley's Aunt; To You at Home Today
1966	Ian Carmichael	Simon and Laura; The World of Wooster
1966	Patrick Wymark	The Plane Makers; Crime and Punishment; Once a Jolly Swagman; Malatesta; Sherlock Holmes; I Remember the Battle; Four of Hearts – Tilt
1967
1967	Warren Mitchell	Till Death Us Do Part
1968
1968	Eric Porter	The Forsyte Saga
1969
1969	Roy Dotrice	Brief Lives

=== 1970s ===
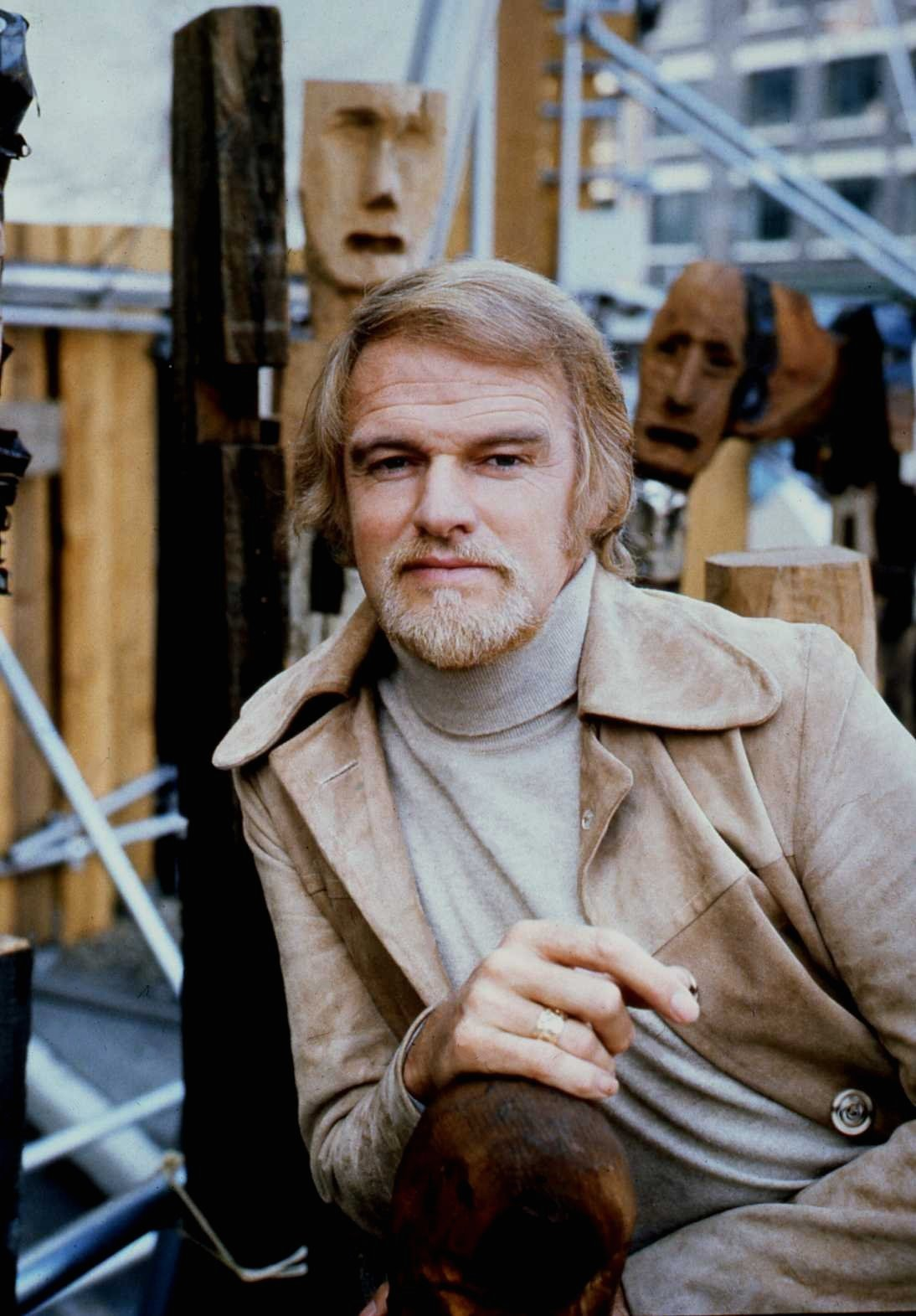
Keith Michell won the award in 1971.

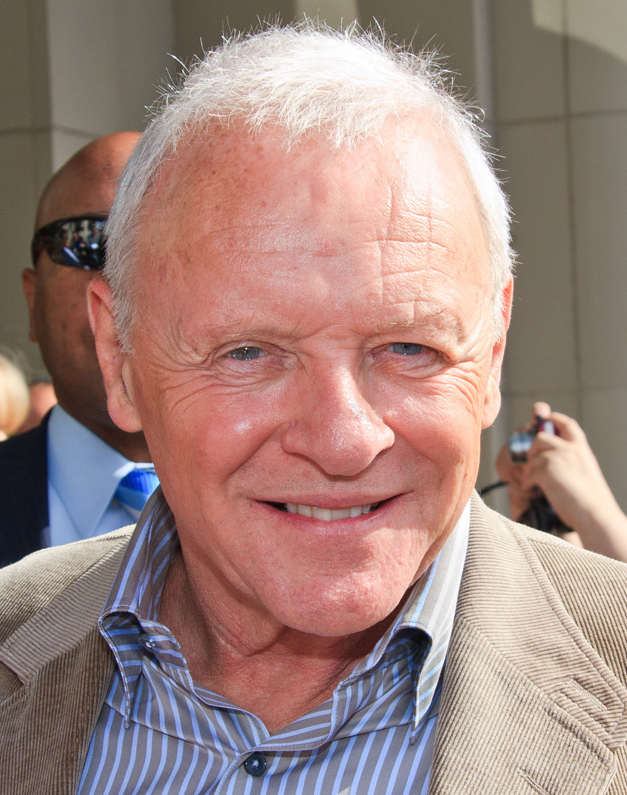
Sir Anthony Hopkins won for War and Peace in 1973

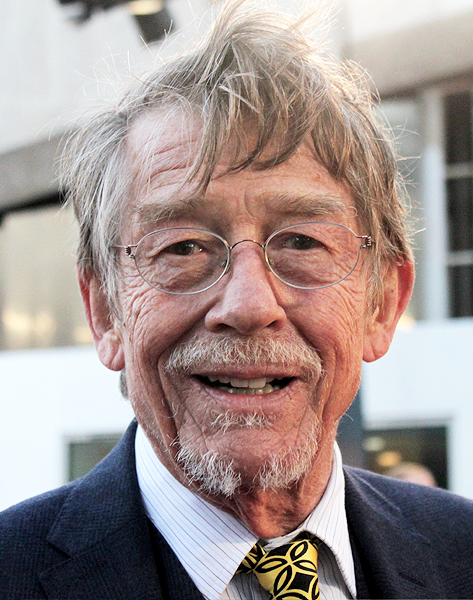
John Hurt won for The Naked Civil Servant (1976)

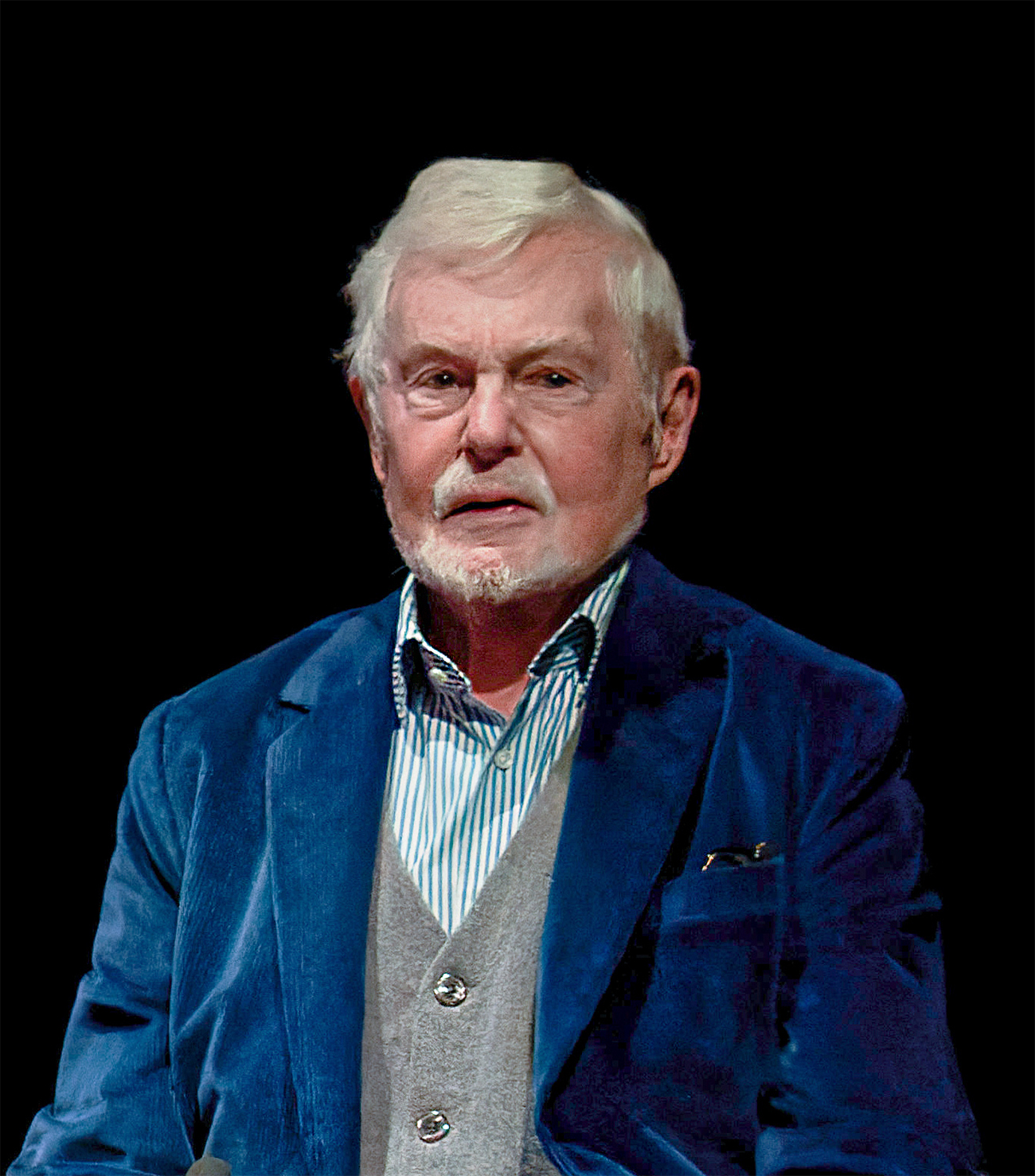
Sir Derek Jacobi won the award for I, Claudius in 1977

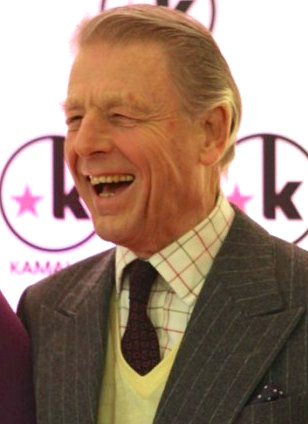
Edward Fox won the award in 1979 for Edward & Mrs. Simpson.

Year	Actors	Work
1970
1970	Edward Woodward	Callan
1970	John Alderton	Please Sir!
1970	Colin Blakely	Son of Man, The Way We Live Now
1970	Arthur Lowe	Dad's Army
1971
1971	Keith Michell	The Six Wives of Henry VIII
1971	Michael Bryant	The Roads to Freedom
1971	Anthony Hopkins	The Great Inimitable Mr. Dickens, Uncle Vanya, Hearts and Flowers, Danton
1971	Michael Jayston	Charles Dickens, Mad Jack, Beethoven
1971	Freddie Jones	Germinal/Omnibus: John Clare "I Am..."/Sweeney Todd/Uncle Vanya/Menace: The Straight And Narrow
1972
1972	John Le Mesurier	Traitor
1972	Alfred Burke	Public Eye
1972	Frank Finlay	Casanova
1972	Kenneth Haigh	Search for the Nile, Man at the Top
1973
1973	Anthony Hopkins	War and Peace
1973	Michael Bryant	The Duchess of Malfi, Colditz
1973	Nicol Williamson	The Resistible Rise of Arturo Ui
1974
1974	Frank Finlay	The Adventures of Don Quixote; Candide; The Death of Adolf Hitler
1974	Michael Crawford	Some Mothers Do 'Ave 'Em
1974	Bernard Hepton	The Adventures of Don Quixote, Colditz
1974	Laurence Olivier	Long Day's Journey Into Night
1975
1975	Peter Barkworth	Crown Matrimonial
1975	Michael Bryant	Mr Axelford's Angel
1975	Gordon Jackson	Upstairs, Downstairs
1975	Arthur Lowe	Microbes and Men, David Copperfield
1976
1976	John Hurt	The Naked Civil Servant
1976	Alan Bates	Plaintiffs and Defendants, Two Sundays
1976	Tony Britton	The Nearly Man
1976	Timothy West	Edward the Seventh
1977
1977	Derek Jacobi	I, Claudius
1977	James Bolam	When the Boat Comes In
1977	Tom Conti	The Glittering Prizes
1977	Jack Shepherd	Bill Brand, Ready When You Are Mr McGill
1978
1978	Peter Barkworth	Professional Foul
1978	James Bolam	When the Boat Comes In
1978	Derek Jacobi	Philby, Burgess and Maclean
1978	Robert Powell	Jesus of Nazareth
1979
1979	Edward Fox	Edward and Mrs Simpson
1979	Tom Bell	Out
1979	Ian Holm	Night School, Flayed, Mirage, The Lost Boys
1979	Bob Hoskins	Pennies From Heaven

=== 1980s ===
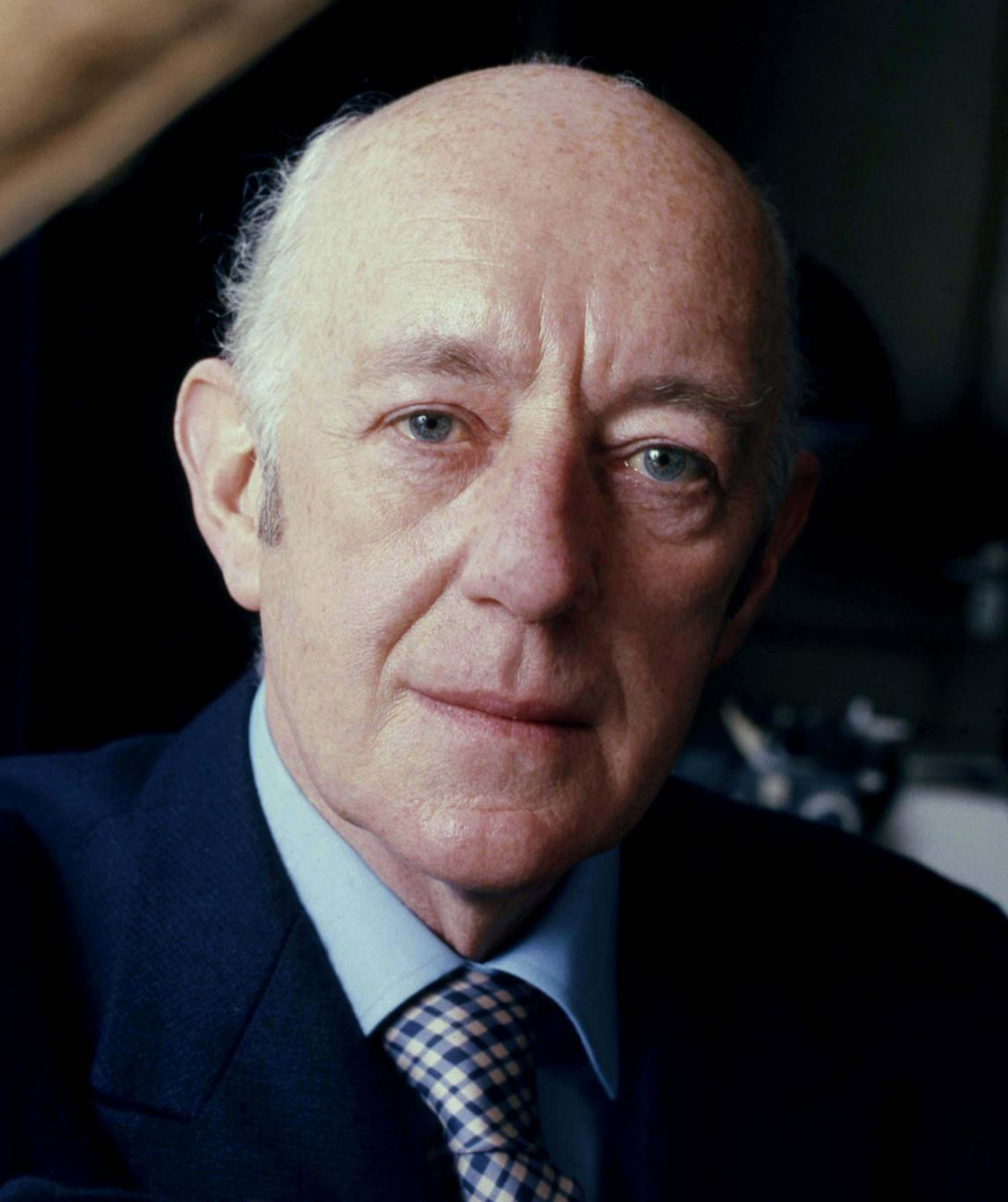
Alec Guinness has won twice, for Tinker Tailor Soldier Spy (1980) and Smiley's People (1983).

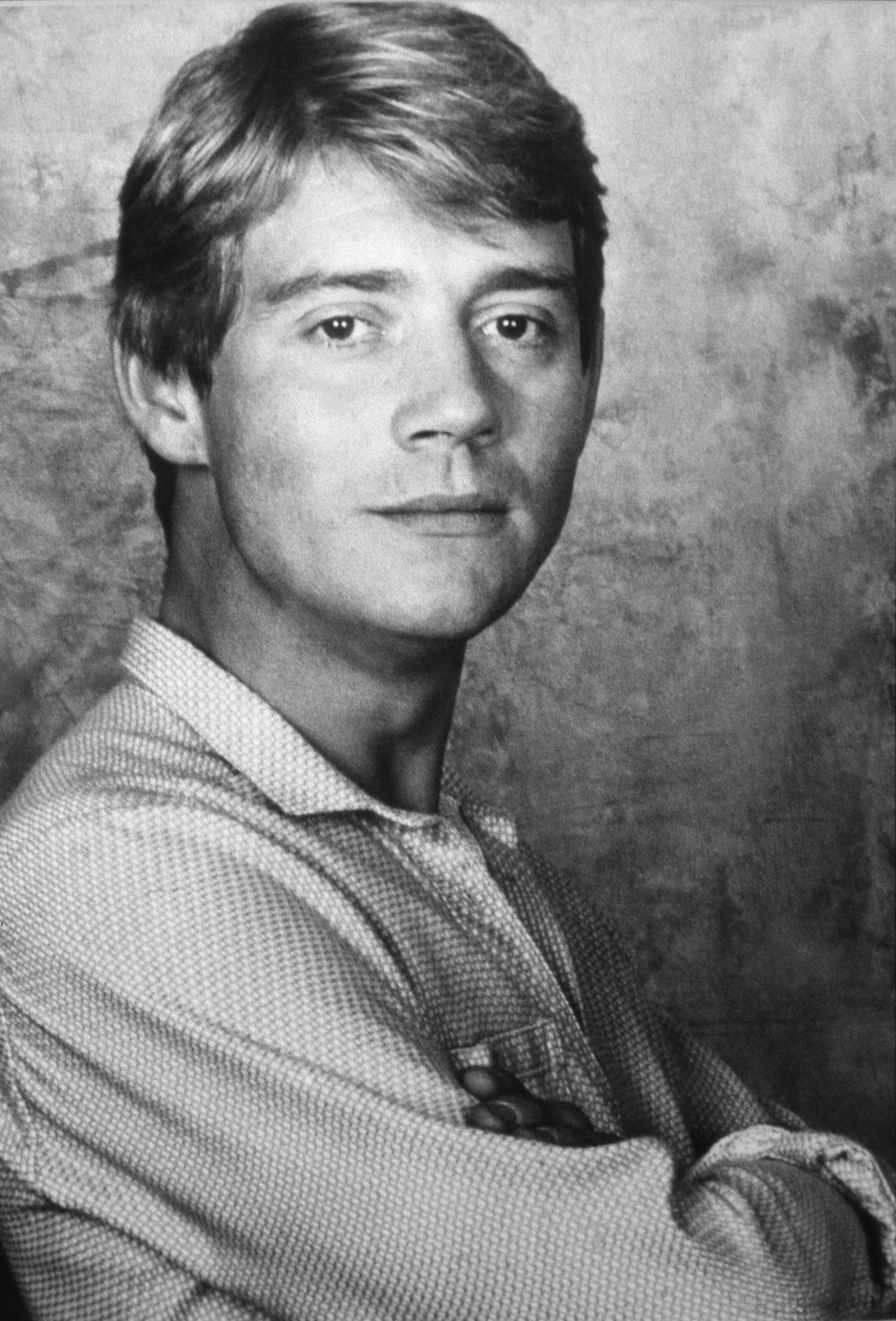
Anthony Andrews won the award for Brideshead Revisited in 1982.

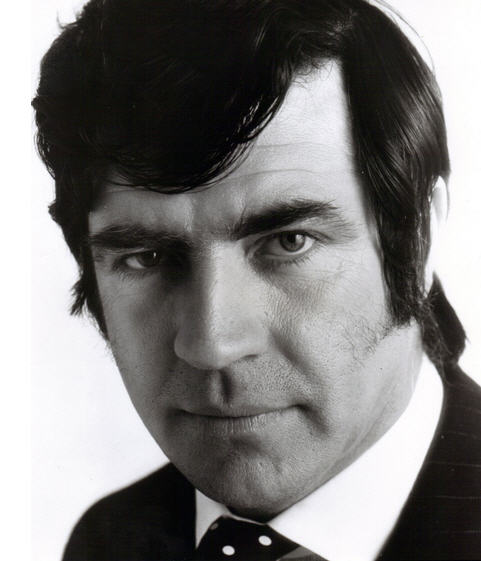
Alan Bates won in 1984.

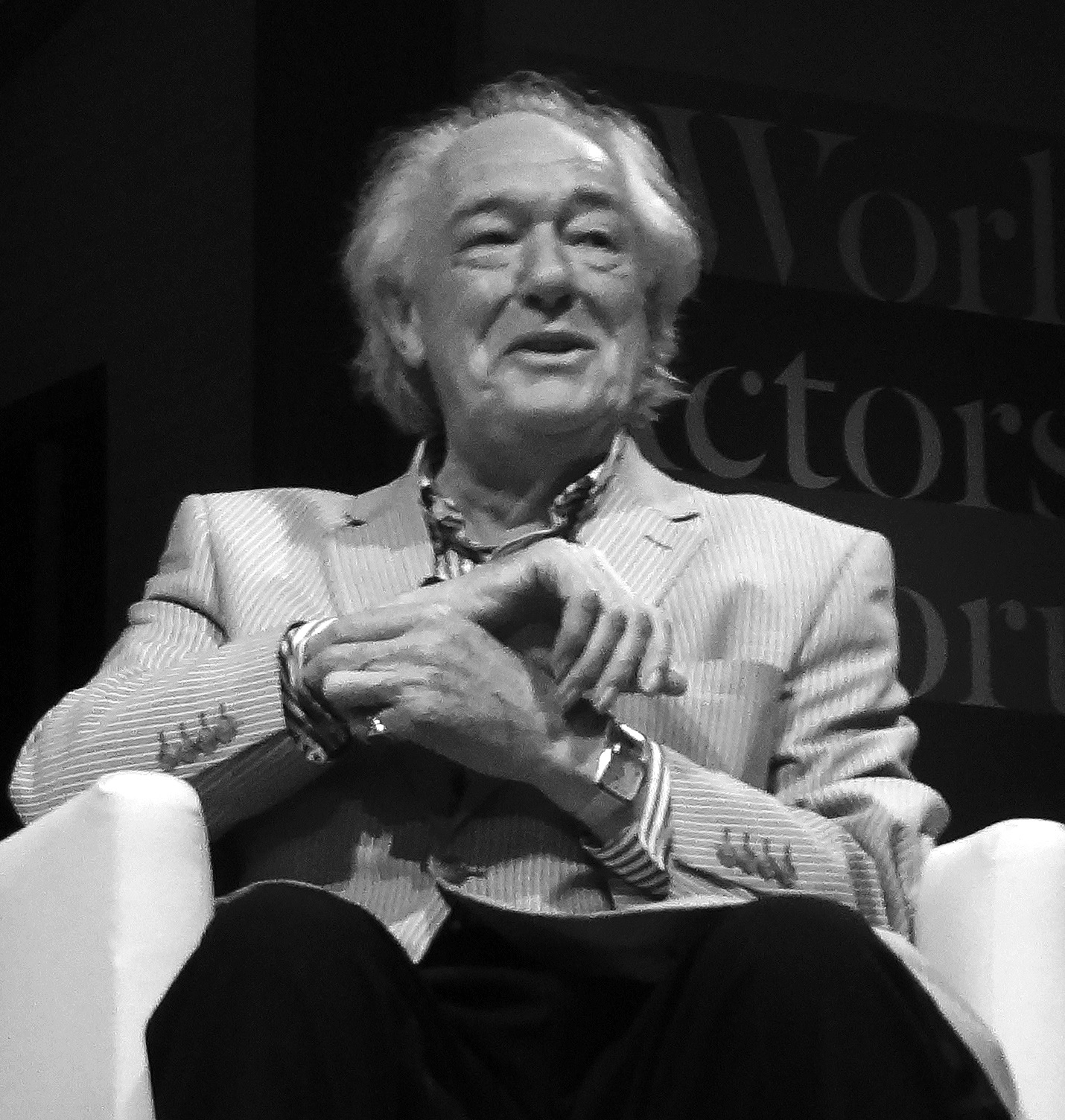
Michael Gambon won in 1987. Gambon holds the record of most wins in this category with four, including three consecutive wins.

Year	Actors	Work
1980
1980	Alec Guinness	Tinker, Tailor, Soldier, Spy
1980	Robert Hardy	Speed King & All Creatures Great and Small
1980	Leo McKern	Rumpole of the Bailey
1980	Timothy West	Churchill and the Generals; Henry VIII; Crime and Punishment; Timothy West as Beecham
1981
1981	Denholm Elliott	Gentle Folk; In Hiding; Blade on the Feather; The Stinker (Tales of the Unexpected)
1981	Trevor Howard	The Shillingbury Blowers; Staying On
1981	Leo McKern	Rumpole's Return
1981	Sam Waterston	Oppenheimer
1982
1982	Anthony Andrews	Brideshead Revisited
1982	Robert Hardy	Winston Churchill: The Wilderness Years; Fothergill
1982	John Gielgud	Brideshead Revisited
1982	Nickolas Grace	Brideshead Revisited
1982	Jeremy Irons	Brideshead Revisited
1983
1983	Alec Guinness	Smiley's People
1983	George Cole	Minder
1983	Bernard Hill	Boys from the Blackstuff
1983	Laurence Olivier	A Voyage Round My Father
1984
1984	Alan Bates	An Englishman Abroad
1984	Leo McKern	Rumpole of the Bailey; Reilly, Ace of Spies
1984	Ronald Pickup	Orwell on Jura; Waters of the Moon
1984	Martin Sheen	Kennedy
1985
1985	Tim Pigott-Smith	The Jewel In The Crown
1985	George Cole	Minder
1985	Charles Dance	The Jewel In The Crown
1985	Art Malik	The Jewel In The Crown
1986
1986	Bob Peck	Edge of Darkness
1986	Alec Guinness	Monsignor Quioxte
1986	Joe Don Baker	Edge of Darkness
1986	Ben Kingsley	Silas Marner
1987
1987	Michael Gambon	The Singing Detective
1987	Colin Blakely	Drums Along Balmoral Drive
1987	Denholm Elliott	Hotel du Lac
1987	Paul McGann	The Monocled Mutineer
1987	Patrick Malahide	The Singing Detective
1987	David Threlfall	Paradise Postponed
1988
1988	David Jason	Porterhouse Blue
1988	Kenneth Branagh	Fortunes of War; The Lady's Not for Burning
1988	Ray McAnally	A Perfect Spy; Scout
1988	Robbie Coltrane	Tutti Frutti
1989
1989	Ray McAnally	A Very British Coup
1989	Alan Bennett	A Chip in the Sugar
1989	Colin Firth	Tumbledown
1989	Ian Holm	Game, Set and Match

=== 1990s ===
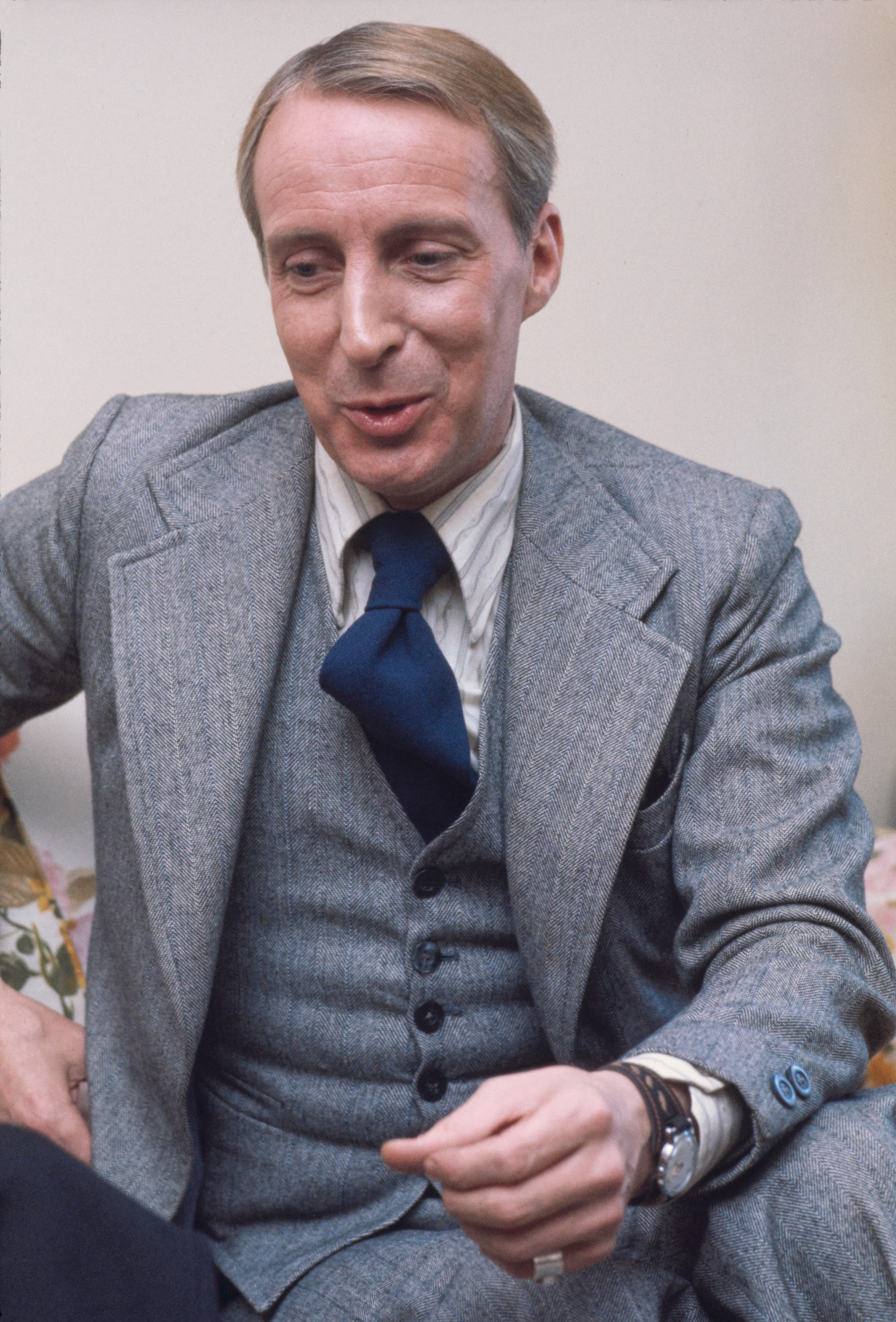
Ian Richardson won in 1991 for his role as Francis Urquhart in House of Cards.

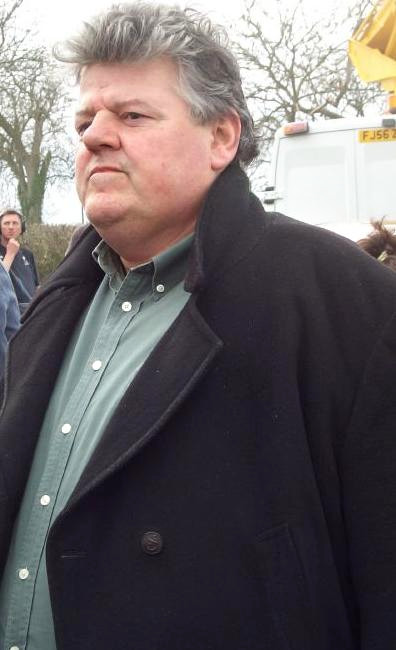
Robbie Coltrane won the award three consecutive times for his role as Dr. Edward "Fitz" Fitzgerald in Cracker in 1994, 1995, and 1996

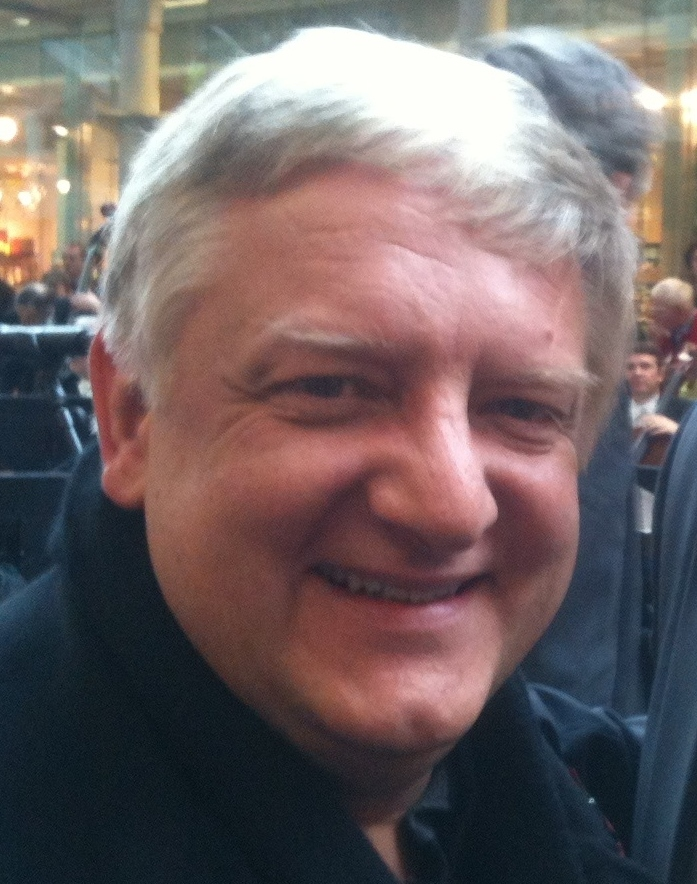
Simon Russell Beale won in 1998 for A Dance to the Music of Time.

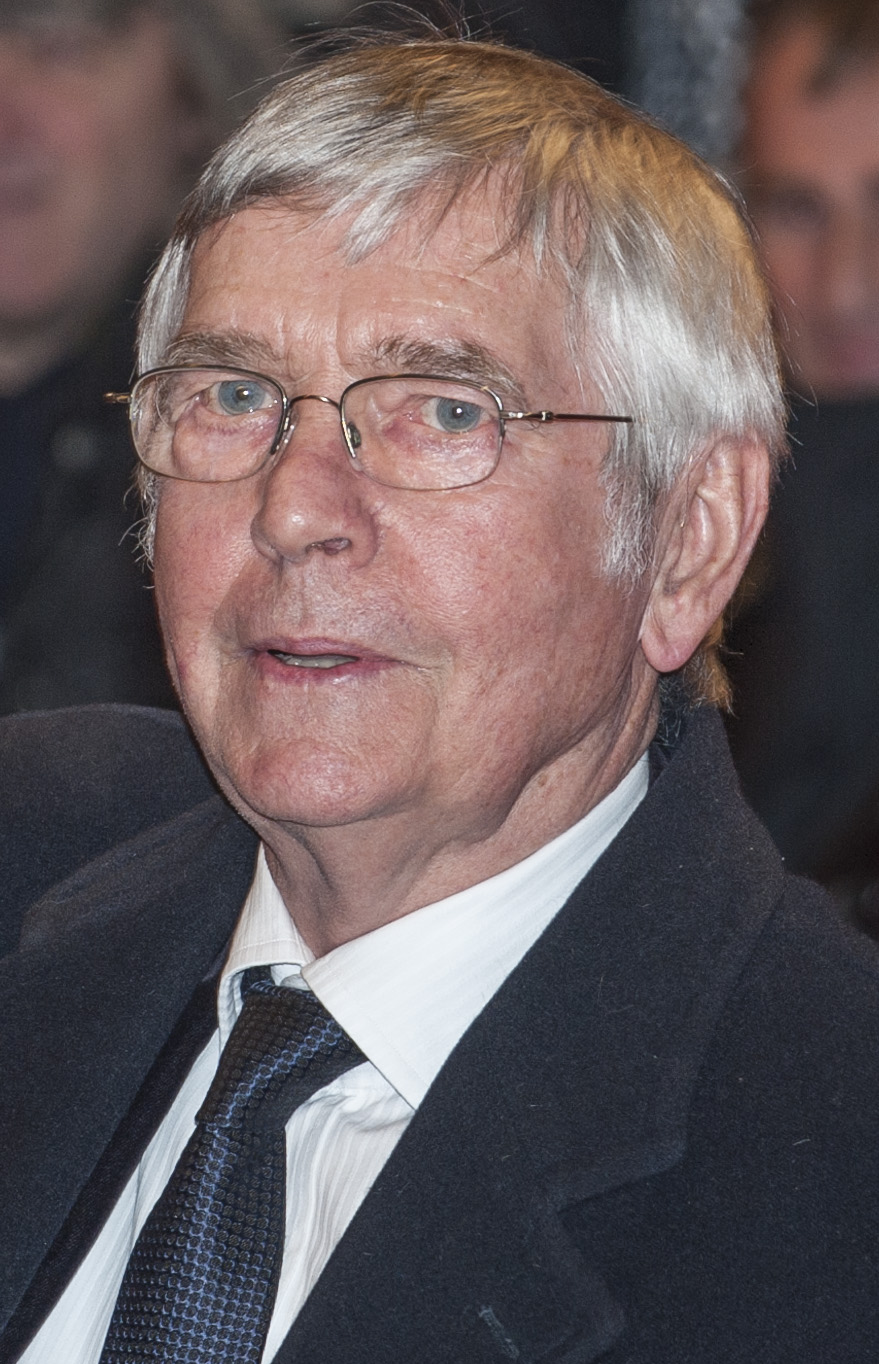
Tom Courtenay won in 1999 for A Rather English Marriage.

Year	Actors	Work	Character	Network
1990
1990	John Thaw	Inspector Morse	Endeavour Morse	ITV
1990	Joss Ackland	First and Last	Alan Holly	BBC One
1990	Alfred Molina	The Accountant	Lionel Ellerman	BBC One
1990	John Gielgud	Summer's Lease	Haverford Downs	BBC Two
1991
1991	Ian Richardson	House of Cards	Francis Urquhart	BBC
1991	John Thaw	Inspector Morse	Endeavour Morse	ITV
1991	David Suchet	Agatha Christie's Poirot	Hercule Poirot	ITV
1991	Albert Finney	The Green Man	Maurice Allington	BBC One
1992
1992	Robert Lindsay	G.B.H.	Michael Murray	Channel 4
1992	John Thaw	Inspector Morse	Endeavour Morse	ITV
1992	Tom Bell	Prime Suspect	Bill Otley	ITV
1992	Michael Palin	G.B.H.	Jim Nelson	Channel 4
1993
1993	John Thaw	Inspector Morse	Endeavour Morse	ITV
1993	Alan Bates	Unnatural Pursuits	Hamish Partt	BBC Two
1993	Brian Cox	The Lost Language of Cranes	Owen Benjamin	BBC Two
1993	Ian Richardson	An Ungentlemanly Act	Rex Hunt	BBC Two
1994
1994	Robbie Coltrane	Cracker	Dr. Edward "Fitz" Fitzgerald	ITV
1994	Michael Kitchen	To Play the King	The King	BBC
1994	Ian Richardson	To Play the King	Francis Urquhart	BBC
1994	Neil Pearson	Between the Lines	Tony Clark	BBC One
1995
1995	Robbie Coltrane	Cracker	Dr. Edward "Fitz" Fitzgerald	ITV
1995	Pete Postlethwaite	Martin Chuzzlewit	Montague Tigg	BBC Two
1995	Paul Scofield	Martin Chuzzlewit	Old Martin Chuzzlewitt	BBC Two
1995	Tom Wilkinson	Martin Chuzzlewit	Seth Pecksniff	BBC Two
1996 (42nd)
1996 (42nd)	Robbie Coltrane	Cracker	Dr. Edward "Fitz" Fitzgerald	ITV
1996 (42nd)	Colin Firth	Pride and Prejudice	Mr. Darcy	BBC One
1996 (42nd)	Benjamin Whitrow	Pride and Prejudice	Mr. Bennet	BBC One
1996 (42nd)	Robert Lindsay	Jake's Progress	Jamie Diadoni	Channel 4
1996 (42nd)	Ian Richardson	The Final Cut	Francis Urquhart	BBC
1997 (43rd)
1997 (43rd)	Nigel Hawthorne	The Fragile Heart	Edgar Pascoe	Channel 4
1997 (43rd)	Albert Finney	Cold Lazarus / Karaoke	Daniel Feeld	BBC One / Channel 4
1997 (43rd)	Christopher Eccleston	Our Friends in the North	Dominic 'Nicky' Hutchinson	BBC Two
1997 (43rd)	Peter Vaughan	Our Friends in the North	Felix Hutchinson	BBC Two
1998 (44th)
1998 (44th)	Simon Russell Beale	A Dance to the Music of Time	Kenneth Widmerpool	Channel 4
1998 (44th)	Derek Jacobi	Breaking the Code	Alan Turing	BBC
1998 (44th)	Robert Carlyle	Hamish Macbeth	Hamish Macbeth	BBC One
1998 (44th)	Tom Wilkinson	Cold Enough for Snow	Hugh Lloyd	BBC One
1999 (45th)
1999 (45th)	Tom Courtenay	A Rather English Marriage	Roy Southgate	BBC
1999 (45th)	Robert Carlyle	Looking After Jo Jo	John Joe "Jo Jo" McCann	BBC Two
1999 (45th)	Timothy Spall	Our Mutual Friend	Mr. Venus	BBC Two
1999 (45th)	Albert Finney	A Rather English Marriage	Reggie Conyngham-Jervis	BBC

=== 2000s ===
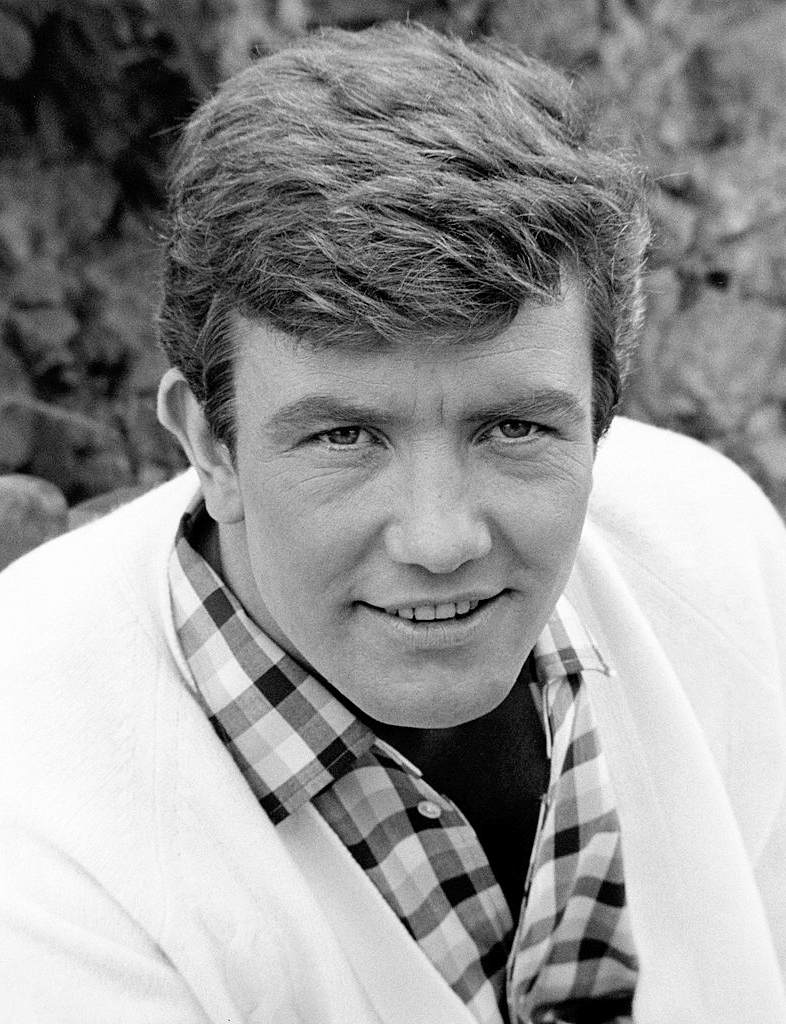
Albert Finney won for The Gathering Storm (2003).

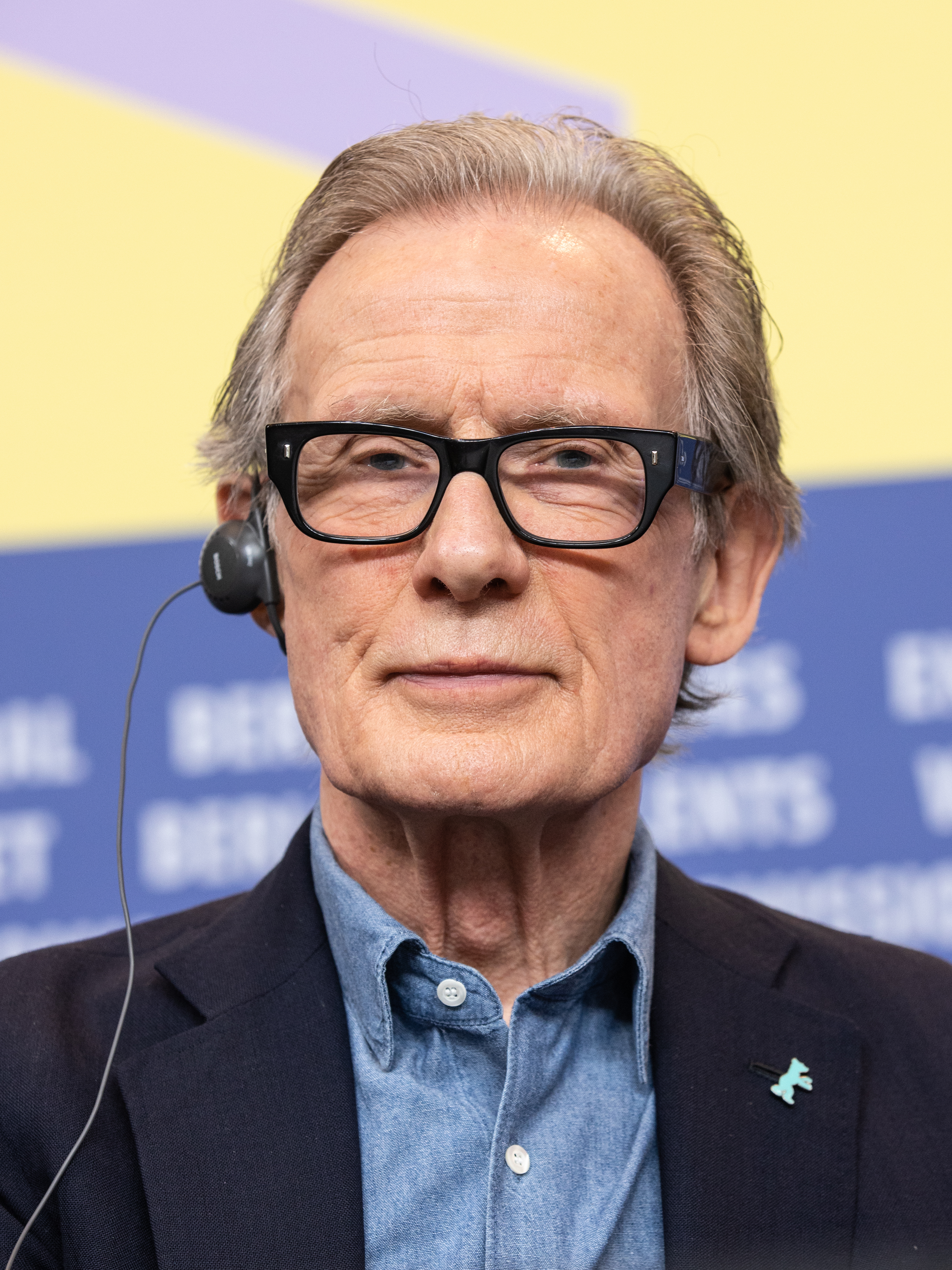
Bill Nighy won for State of Play in 2004.

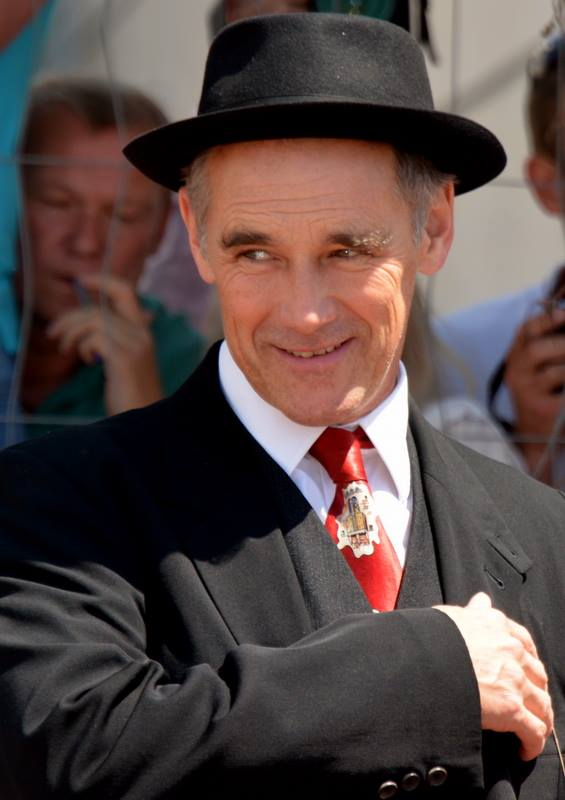
Mark Rylance has won twice, for The Government Inspector (2006) and Wolf Hall (2016).

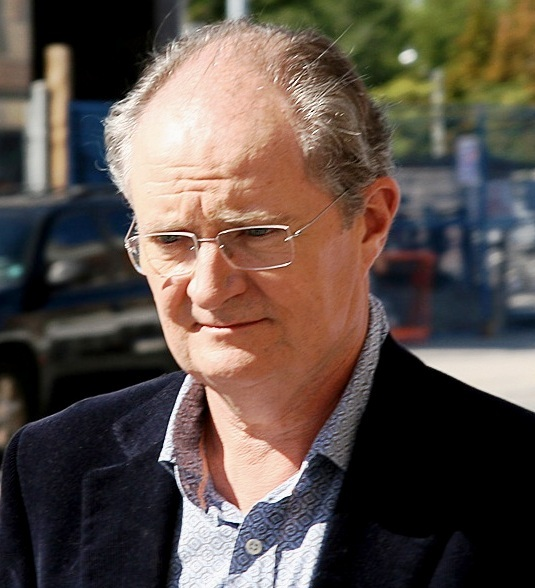
Jim Broadbent won for Longford in 2007

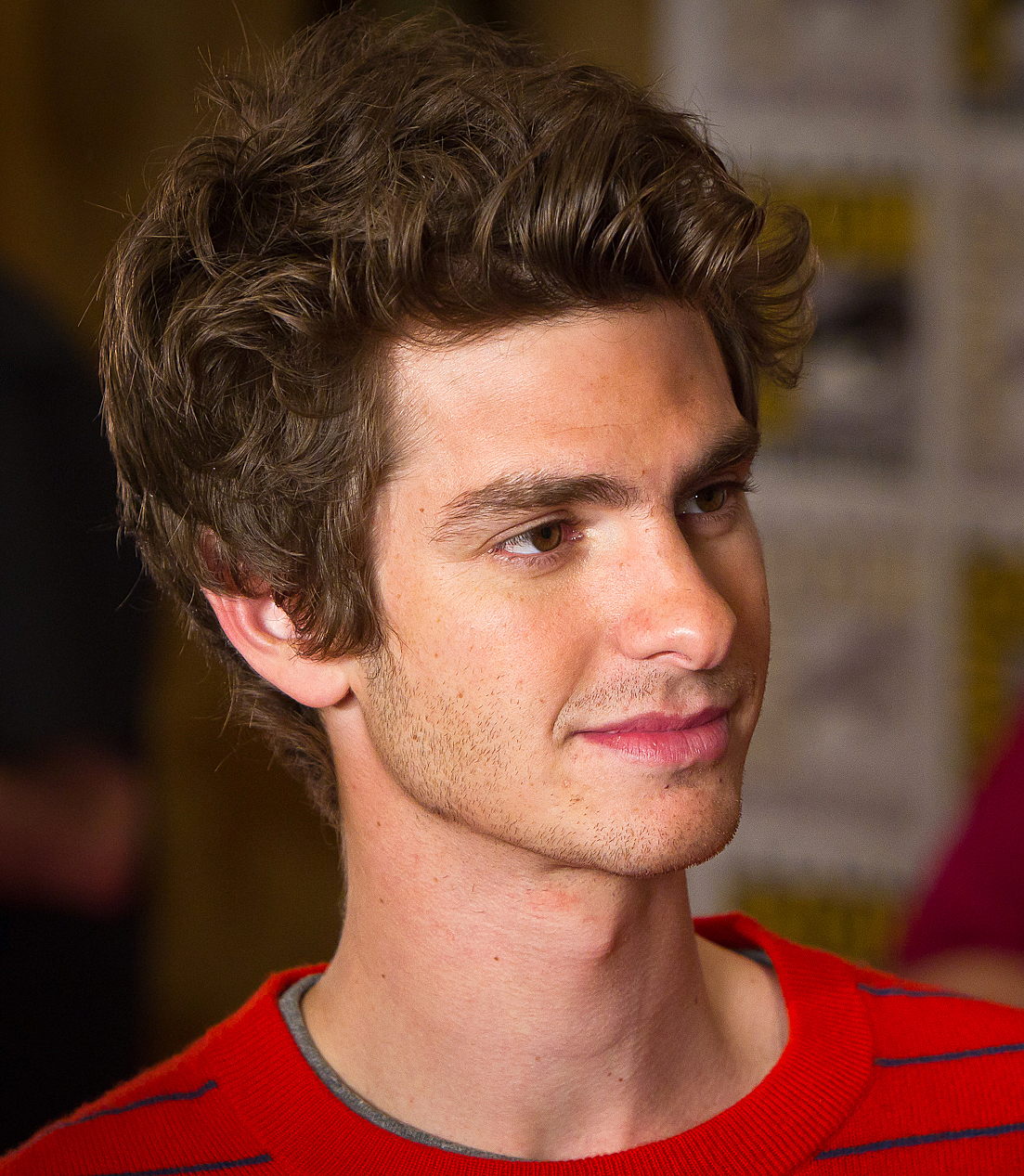
Andrew Garfield won for Boy A (2009)

Year	Actors	Work	Character	Network
2000 (46th)
2000 (46th)	Michael Gambon	Wives and Daughters	Squire Hamley	BBC One
2000 (46th)	Aidan Gillen	Queer as Folk	Stuart Alan Jones	Channel 4
2000 (46th)	Pete Postlethwaite	Lost for Words	Deric Longden	ITV
2000 (46th)	Timothy Spall	Shooting the Past	Oswald Bates	BBC Two
2001 (47th)
2001 (47th)	Michael Gambon	Longitude	John Harrison	Channel 4
2001 (47th)	Steven Mackintosh	Care	Davy Younger	BBC One
2001 (47th)	Pete Postlethwaite	The Sins	Len Green	BBC One
2001 (47th)	Ken Stott	The Vice	Pat Chappel	ITV
2002 (48th)
2002 (48th)	Michael Gambon	Perfect Strangers	Raymond Symon	BBC Two
2002 (48th)	Alan Bates	Love in a Cold Climate	Matthew Alconleigh	BBC One
2002 (48th)	David Suchet	The Way We Live Now	Augustus Melmotte	BBC One
2002 (48th)	Timothy Spall	Vacuuming Completely Nude in Paradise	Tommy Rag	BBC Two
2003 (49th)
2003 (49th)	Albert Finney	The Gathering Storm	Winston Churchill	BBC
2003 (49th)	James Nesbitt	Bloody Sunday	Ivan Cooper	ITV
2003 (49th)	Kenneth Branagh	Conspiracy	Reinhard Heydrich	BBC Two/HBO
2003 (49th)	Kenneth Branagh	Shackleton	Ernest Shackleton	Channel 4
2004 (50th)
2004 (50th)	Bill Nighy	State of Play	Cameron Lloyd	BBC One
2004 (50th)	Christopher Eccleston	The Second Coming	Steven Baxter	ITV
2004 (50th)	Jim Broadbent	The Young Visiters	Alfred Salteena	BBC One
2004 (50th)	David Morrissey	State of Play	Stephen Collins	BBC One
2005 (51st)
2005 (51st)	Rhys Ifans	Not Only But Always	Peter Cook	Channel 4
2005 (51st)	Benedict Cumberbatch	Hawking	Stephen Hawking	BBC Two
2005 (51st)	Mark Strong	The Long Firm	Harry Starks	BBC Two
2005 (51st)	Michael Sheen	Dirty Filthy Love	Mark Furness	ITV
2006 (52nd)
2006 (52nd)	Mark Rylance	The Government Inspector	Dr. David Kelly	Channel 4
2006 (52nd)	Denis Lawson	Bleak House	John Jarndyce	BBC One
2006 (52nd)	Rufus Sewell	ShakespeaRe-Told: The Taming of the Shrew	Petruchio	BBC One
2006 (52nd)	Bernard Hill	A Very Social Secretary	David Blunkett	Channel 4
2007 (53rd)
2007 (53rd)	Jim Broadbent	Longford	Frank Pakenham	Channel 4
2007 (53rd)	John Simm	Life on Mars	Sam Tyler	BBC One
2007 (53rd)	Andy Serkis	Longford	Ian Brady	Channel 4
2007 (53rd)	Michael Sheen	Kenneth Williams: Fantabulosa!	Kenneth Williams	BBC Four
2008 (54th)
2008 (54th)	Andrew Garfield	Boy A	Jack Burridge / Eric Wilson	Channel 4
2008 (54th)	Tom Hardy	Stuart: A Life Backwards	Stuart Shorter	BBC Two
2008 (54th)	Matthew MacFadyen	Secret Life	Charlie Webb	Channel 4
2008 (54th)	Antony Sher	Primo	Primo Levi	BBC Four
2009 (55th)
2009 (55th)	Stephen Dillane	The Shooting of Thomas Hurndall	Anthony Hurndall	Channel 4
2009 (55th)	Jason Isaacs	The Curse of Steptoe	Harry H. Corbett	BBC Four
2009 (55th)	Ken Stott	Hancock & Joan	Tony Hancock	BBC Four
2009 (55th)	Ben Whishaw	Criminal Justice	Ben Coulter	BBC One

=== 2010s ===
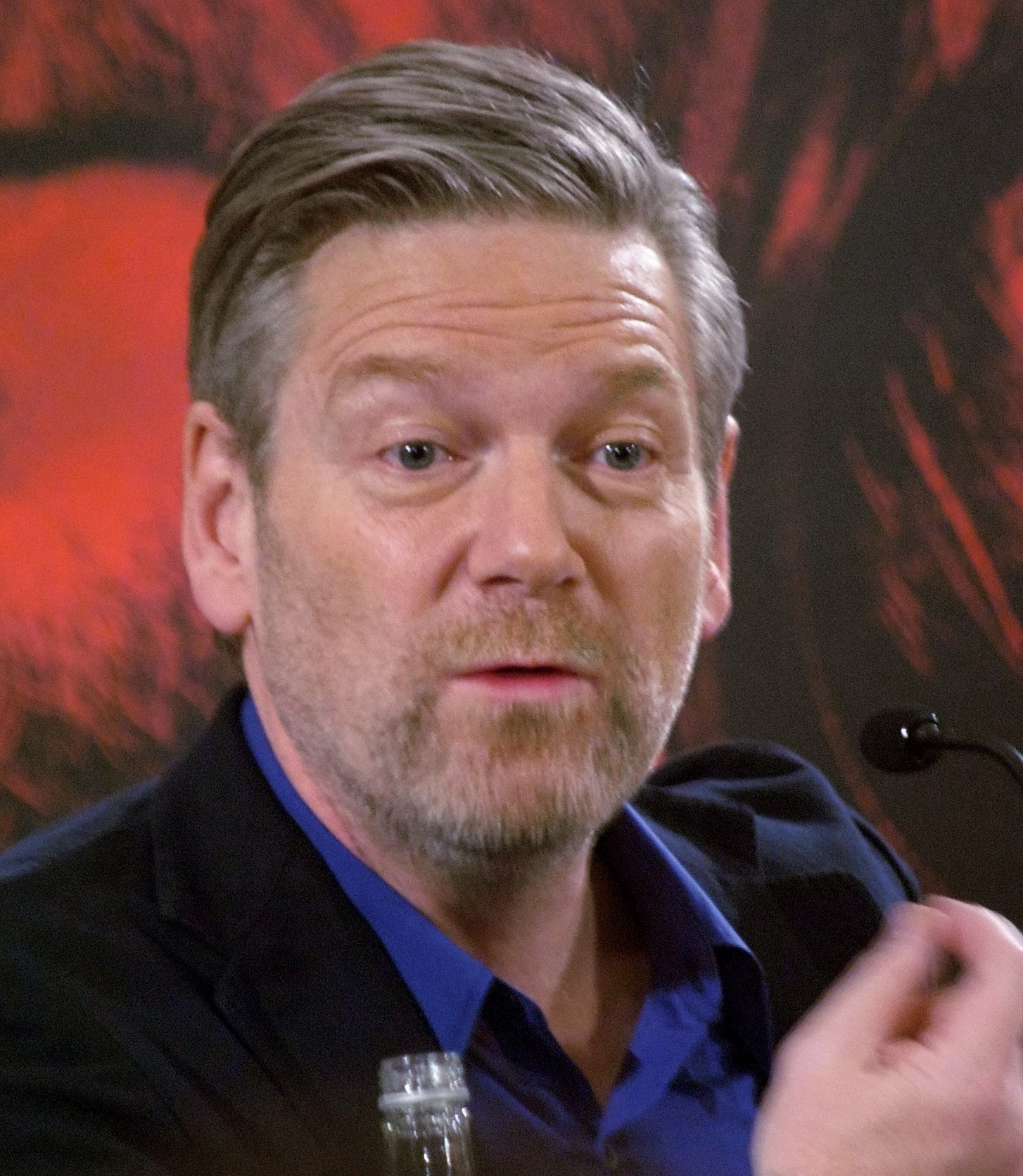
Kenneth Branagh won for Wallander in 2010.

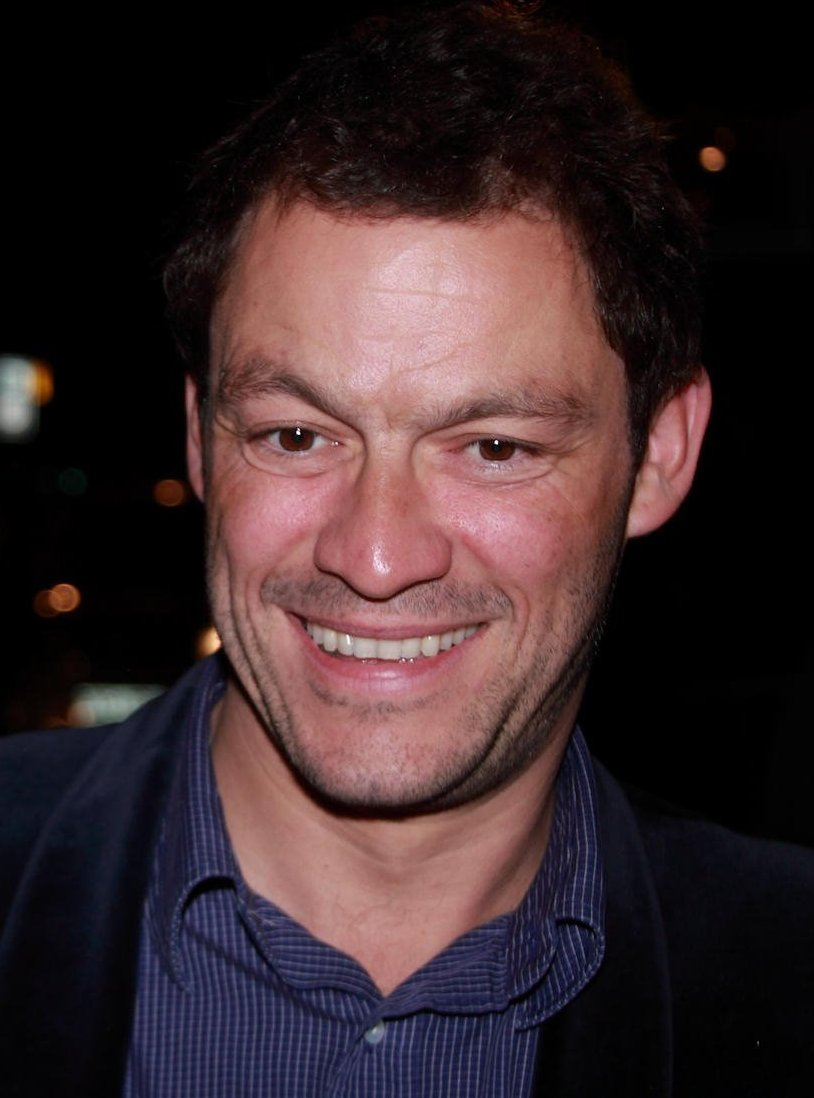
Dominic West won for Appropriate Adult in 2012.

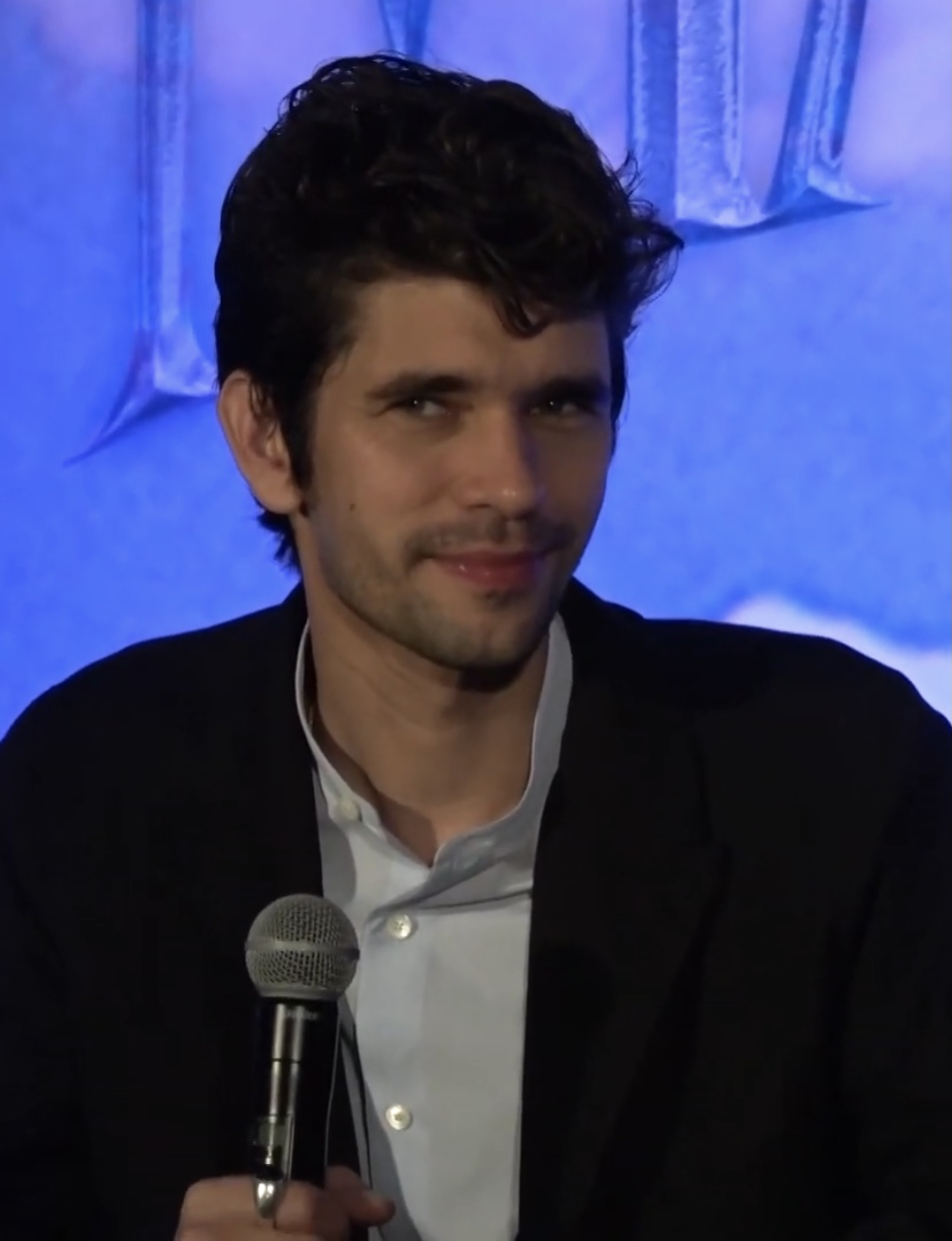
Ben Whishaw won twice for The Hollow Crown (2013) and This Is Going to Hurt (2023)

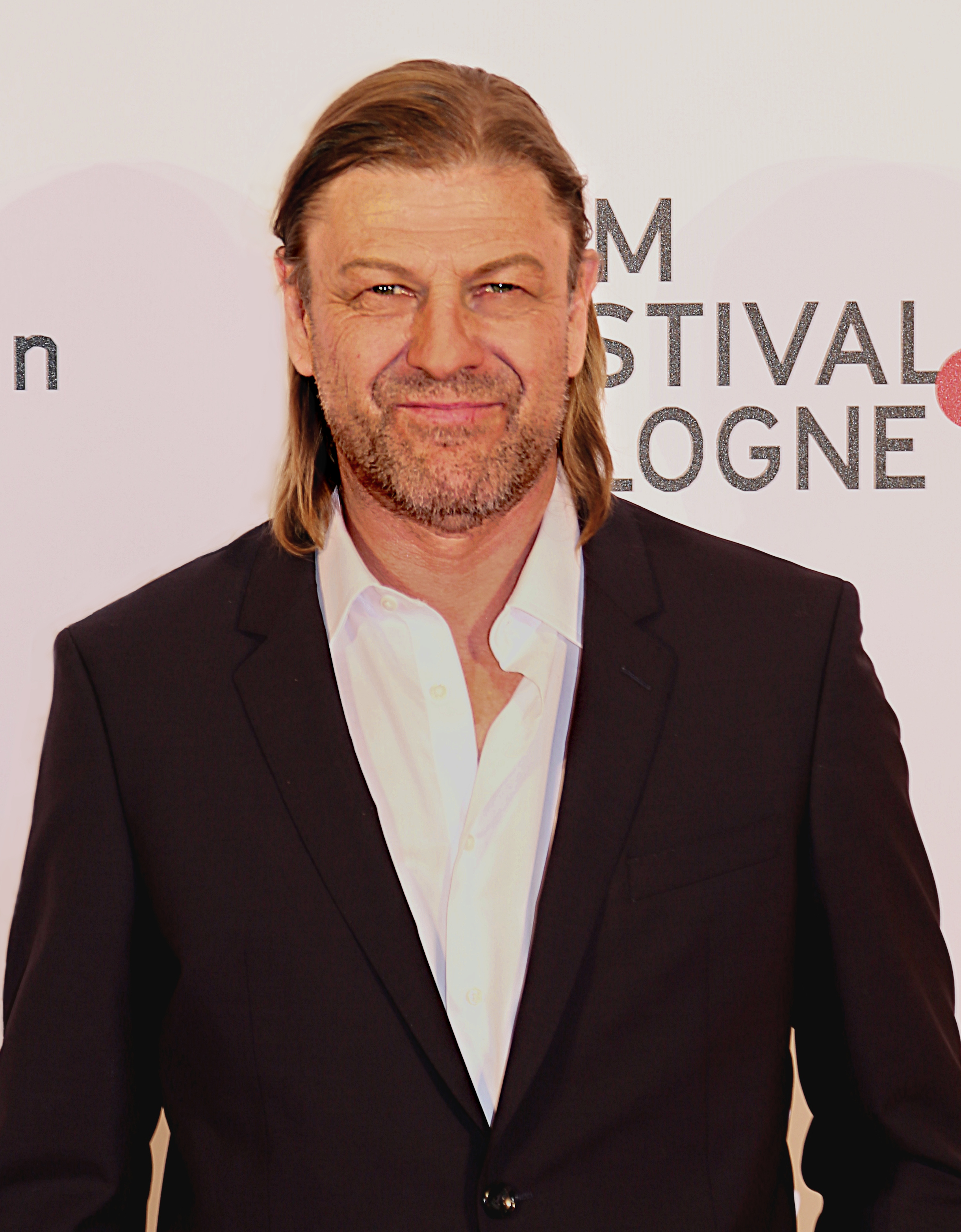
Sean Bean won twice for Broken (2018) and Time (2022)

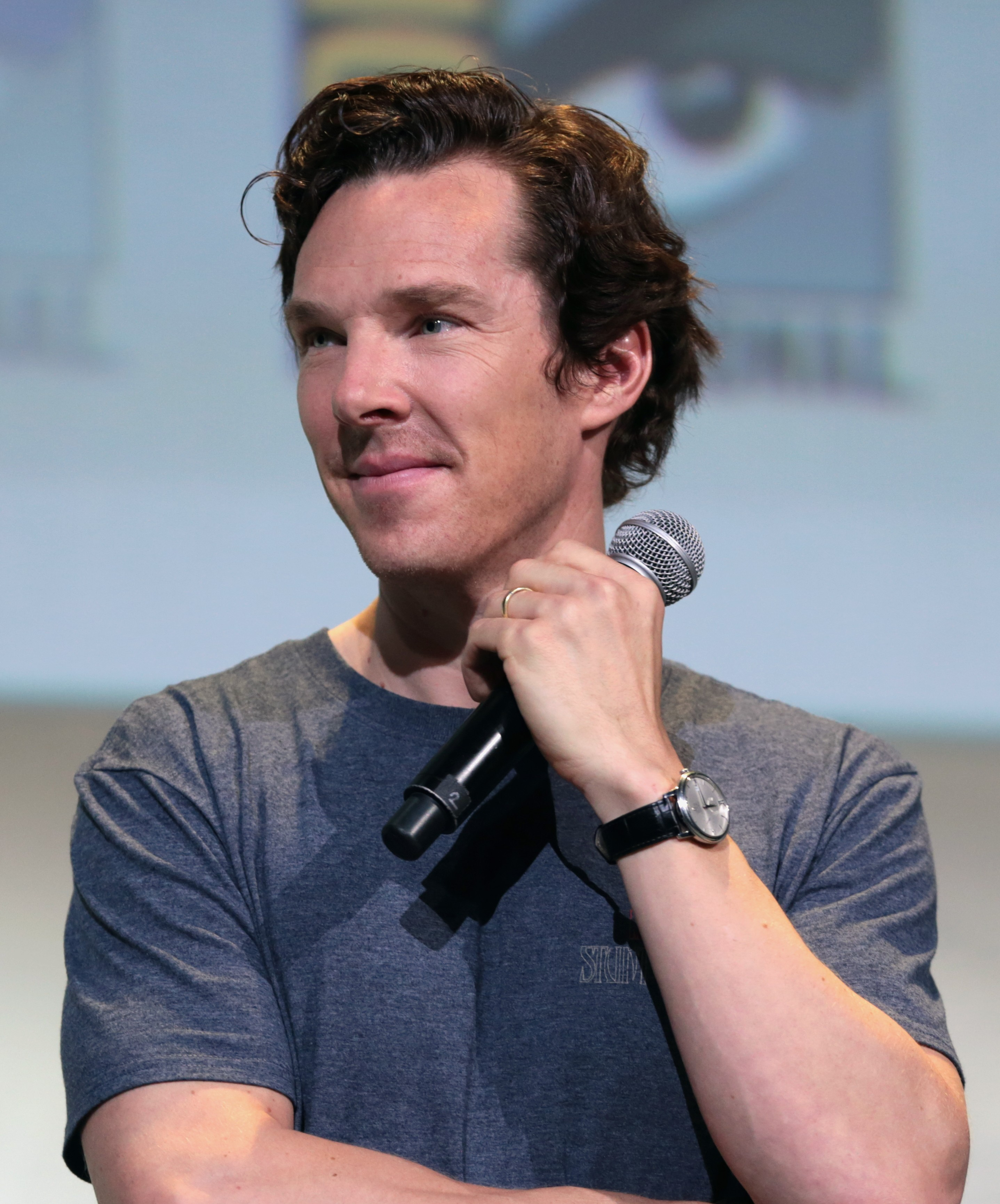
Benedict Cumberbatch won for Patrick Melrose (2019)

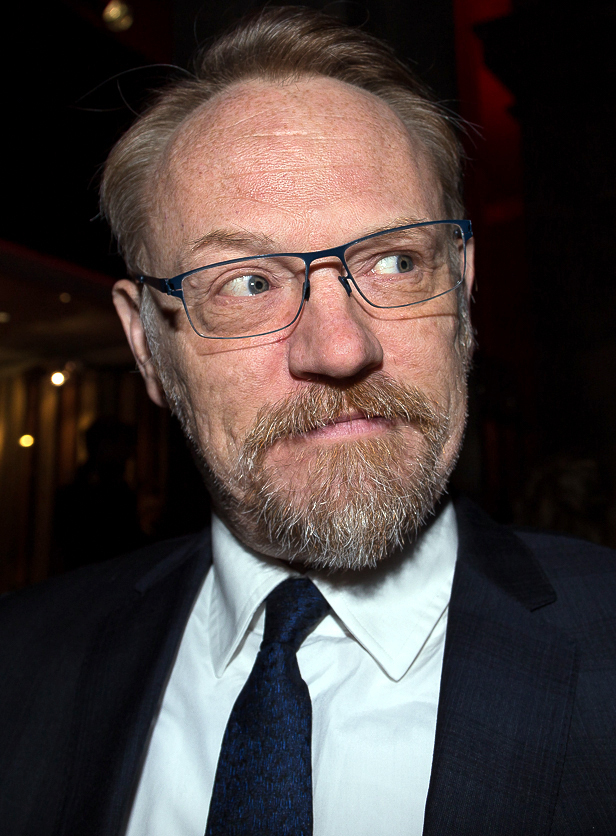
Jared Harris won for Chernobyl (2020)

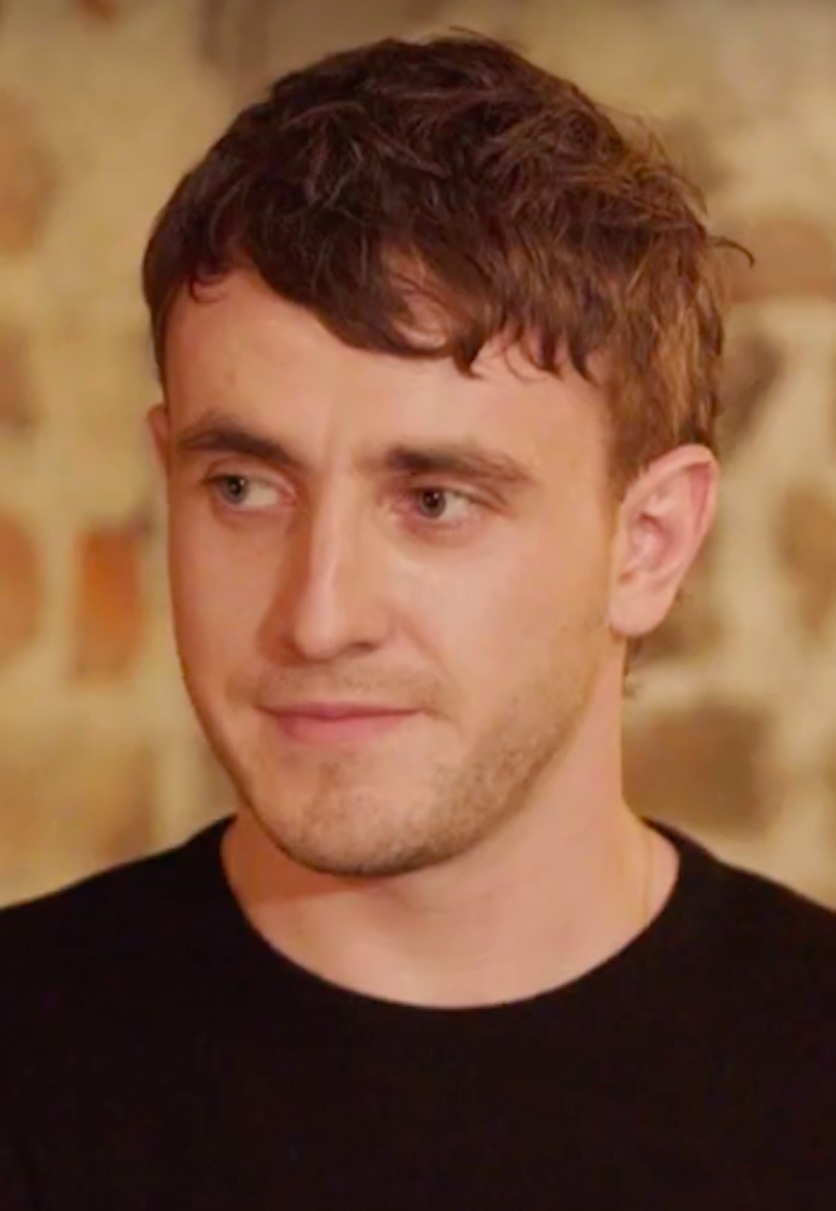
Paul Mescal won for Normal People in 2021.

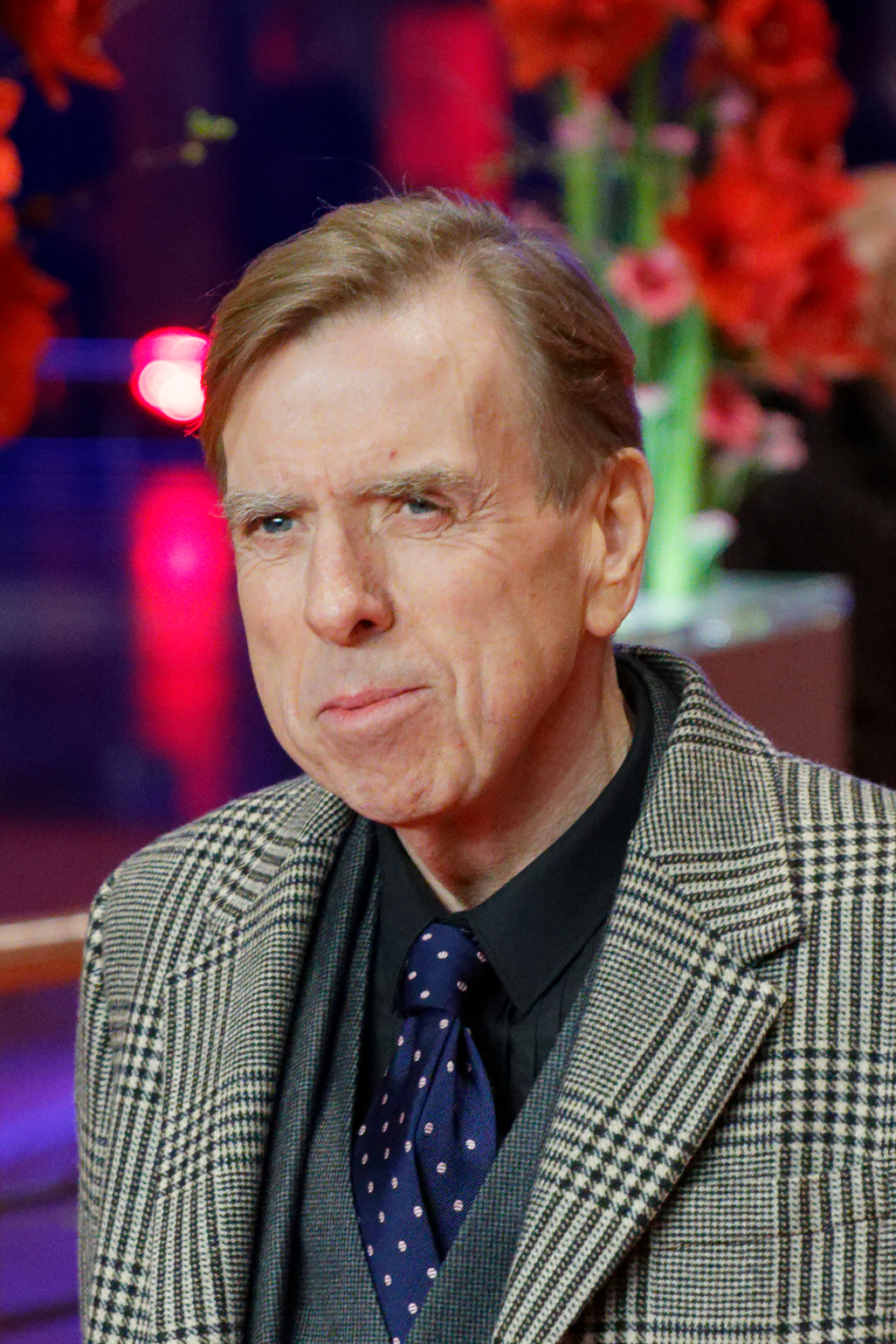
Timothy Spall won for The Sixth Commandment (2024)

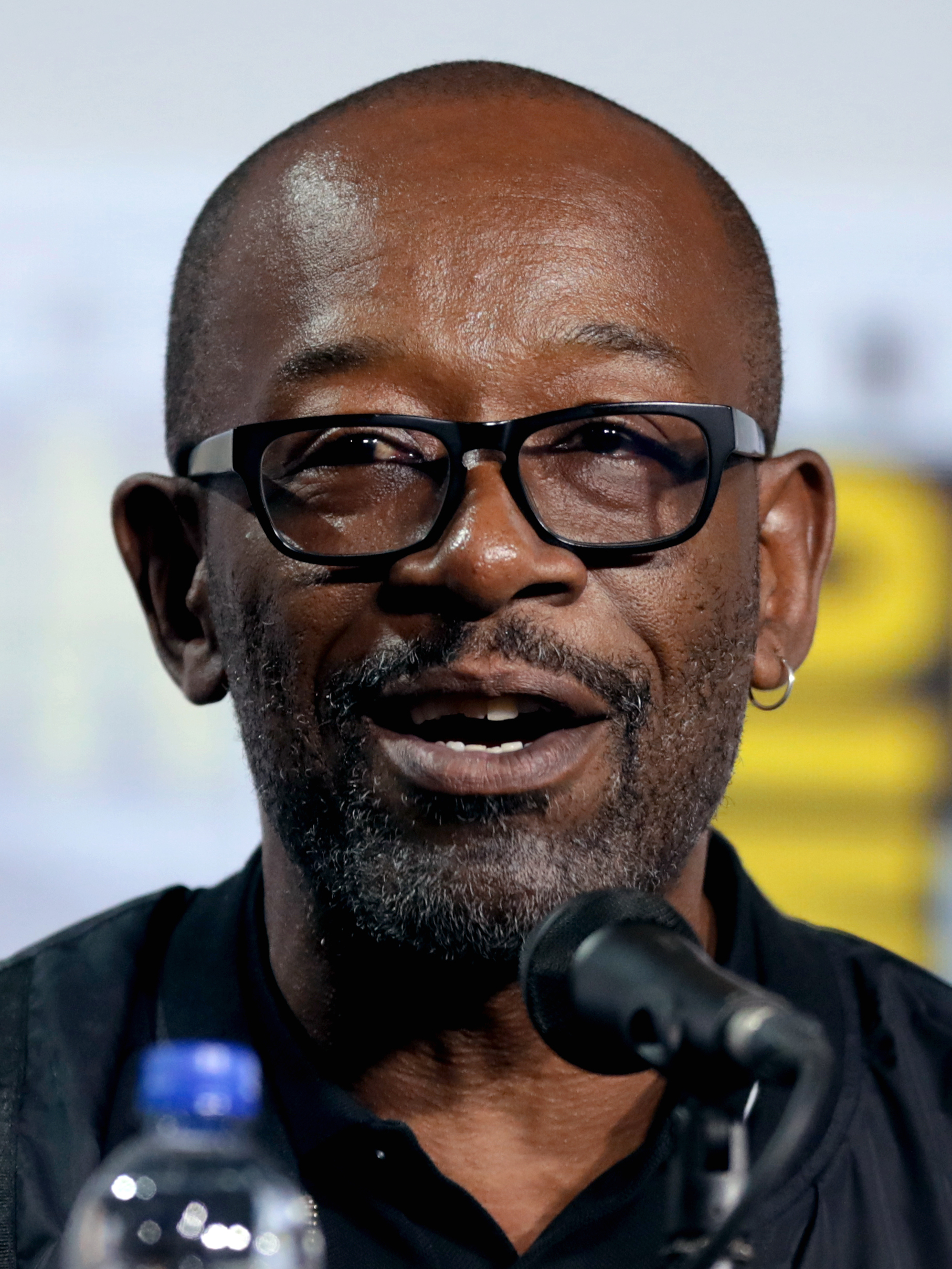
Lennie James won for Mr Loverman (2025)

Year	Actors	Work	Character	Network
2010 (56th)
2010 (56th)	Kenneth Branagh	Wallander	Kurt Wallander	BBC One
2010 (56th)	Brendan Gleeson	Into the Storm	Winston Churchill	BBC
2010 (56th)	John Hurt	An Englishman in New York	Quentin Crisp	ITV
2010 (56th)	David Oyelowo	Small Island	Gilbert Joseph	BBC One
2011 (57th)
2011 (57th)	Daniel Rigby	Eric and Ernie	Eric Morecambe	BBC Two
2011 (57th)	Jim Broadbent	Any Human Heart	Logan Mountstuart	Channel 4
2011 (57th)	Benedict Cumberbatch	Sherlock	Sherlock Holmes	BBC One
2011 (57th)	Matt Smith	Doctor Who	The Doctor	BBC One
2012 (58th)
2012 (58th)	Dominic West	Appropriate Adult	Fred West	ITV
2012 (58th)	Benedict Cumberbatch	Sherlock	Sherlock Holmes	BBC One
2012 (58th)	John Simm	Exile	Tom Ronstadt	BBC One
2012 (58th)	Joseph Gilgun	This Is England '88	Richard Woodford	Channel 4
2013 (59th)
2013 (59th)	Ben Whishaw	The Hollow Crown	Richard II	BBC Two
2013 (59th)	Sean Bean	Accused	Simon/Tracie	BBC One
2013 (59th)	Derek Jacobi	Last Tango in Halifax	Alan Buttershaw	BBC One
2013 (59th)	Toby Jones	The Girl	Alfred Hitchcock	BBC Two
2014 (60th)
2014 (60th)	Sean Harris	Southcliffe	Stephen Morton	Channel 4
2014 (60th)	Jamie Dornan	The Fall	Paul Spector	BBC Two
2014 (60th)	Luke Newberry	In the Flesh	Kieren Walker	BBC Three
2014 (60th)	Dominic West	Burton & Taylor	Richard Burton	BBC Four
2015 (61st)
2015 (61st)	Jason Watkins	The Lost Honour of Christopher Jefferies	Christopher Jefferies	ITV
2015 (61st)	Benedict Cumberbatch	Sherlock	Sherlock Holmes	BBC One
2015 (61st)	James Nesbitt	The Missing	Tony Hughes	BBC One
2015 (61st)	Toby Jones	Marvellous	Neil Baldwin	BBC Two
2016 (62nd)
2016 (62nd)	Mark Rylance	Wolf Hall	Thomas Cromwell	BBC Two
2016 (62nd)	Stephen Graham	This is England '90	Andrew "Combo" Gascoigne	Channel 4
2016 (62nd)	Idris Elba	Luther	John Luther	BBC One
2016 (62nd)	Ben Whishaw	London Spy	Daniel Holt	BBC Two
2017 (63rd)
2017 (63rd)	Adeel Akhtar	Murdered by My Father	Shahzad Khan	BBC Three
2017 (63rd)	Babou Ceesay	Damilola, Our Loved Boy	Richard Taylor	BBC One
2017 (63rd)	Robbie Coltrane	National Treasure	Paul Finchley	Channel 4
2017 (63rd)	Benedict Cumberbatch	The Hollow Crown: The Wars of the Roses	Richard III	BBC Two
2018 (64th)
2018 (64th)	Sean Bean	Broken	Michael Kerrigan	BBC One
2018 (64th)	Jack Rowan	Born to Kill	Sam Woodford	Channel 4
2018 (64th)	Joe Cole	Black Mirror	Frank	Netflix
2018 (64th)	Tim Pigott-Smith	King Charles III	King Charles III	BBC Two
2019 (65th)
2019 (65th)	Benedict Cumberbatch	Patrick Melrose	Patrick Melrose	Sky Atlantic
2019 (65th)	Hugh Grant	A Very English Scandal	Jeremy Thorpe	BBC One
2019 (65th)	Lucian Msamati	Kiri	Tobi Akindele	Channel 4
2019 (65th)	Chance Perdomo	Killed by My Debt	Jerome Rogers	BBC Three

=== 2020s ===
Year	Actors	Work	Character	Network
2020 (66th)
2020 (66th)	Jared Harris	Chernobyl	Valery Legasov	Sky Atlantic
2020 (66th)	Stephen Graham	The Virtues	Joseph Lowery	Channel 4
2020 (66th)	Takehiro Hira	Giri/Haji	Kenzo Mori	BBC Two
2020 (66th)	Callum Turner	The Capture	Shaun Emery	BBC One
2021 (67th)
2021 (67th)	Paul Mescal	Normal People	Connell Waldron	BBC Three
2021 (67th)	John Boyega	Small Axe: Red, White and Blue	Leroy Logan	BBC One
2021 (67th)	Paapa Essiedu	I May Destroy You	Kwame	BBC One
2021 (67th)	Shaun Parkes	Small Axe: Mangrove	Frank Crichlow	BBC One
2021 (67th)	Josh O'Connor	The Crown	Charles, Prince of Wales	Netflix
2021 (67th)	Waleed Zuaiter	Baghdad Central	Muhsin al-Khafaji	Channel 4
2022 (68th)
2022 (68th)	Sean Bean	Time	Mark Cobden	BBC One
2022 (68th)	Samuel Adewunmi	You Don't Know Me	Hero	BBC One
2022 (68th)	David Thewlis	Landscapers	Christopher Edwards	Sky Atlantic
2022 (68th)	Olly Alexander	It's a Sin	Ritchie Tozer	Channel 4
2022 (68th)	Stephen Graham	Help	Tony	Channel 4
2022 (68th)	Hugh Quarshie	Stephen	Neville Lawrence	ITV
2023 (69th)
2023 (69th)	Ben Whishaw	This Is Going to Hurt	Adam Kay	BBC One
2023 (69th)	Taron Egerton	Black Bird	James "Jimmy" Keene Jr.	Apple TV+
2023 (69th)	Gary Oldman	Slow Horses	Jackson Lamb	Apple TV+
2023 (69th)	Martin Freeman	The Responder	Chris Carson	BBC One
2023 (69th)	Cillian Murphy	Peaky Blinders	Tommy Shelby	BBC One
2023 (69th)	Chaske Spencer	The English	Sgt. Eli Whipp / Wounded Wolf	BBC Two
2024 (70th)
2024 (70th)	Timothy Spall	The Sixth Commandment	Peter Farquhar	BBC One
2024 (70th)	Brian Cox	Succession	Logan Roy	Sky Atlantic / HBO
2024 (70th)	Dominic West	The Crown	Prince Charles	Netflix
2024 (70th)	Kane Robinson	Top Boy	Gerard "Sully" Sullivan	Netflix
2024 (70th)	Paapa Essiedu	The Lazarus Project	George	Sky Max
2024 (70th)	Steve Coogan	The Reckoning	Jimmy Savile	BBC One
2025 (71st)
2025 (71st)	Lennie James	Mr Loverman	Barrington Jedidiah 'Barry' Walker	BBC One
2025 (71st)	David Tennant	Rivals	Tony, Lord Baddingham	ITV
2025 (71st)	Gary Oldman	Slow Horses	Jackson Lamb	Apple TV+
2025 (71st)	Martin Freeman	The Responder	PC Chris Carson	BBC One
2025 (71st)	Richard Gadd	Baby Reindeer	Donny Dunn	Netflix
2025 (71st)	Toby Jones	Mr Bates vs The Post Office	Alan Bates	ITV1
2026 (72nd)
2026 (72nd)	Stephen Graham	Adolescence	Eddie Miller	Netflix
2026 (72nd)	Taron Egerton	Smoke	Dave Gudsen	Apple TV+
2026 (72nd)	Colin Firth	Lockerbie: A Search for Truth	Jim Swire	Sky Atlantic
2026 (72nd)	Ellis Howard	What It Feels Like for a Girl	Byron/Paris	BBC Three
2026 (72nd)	James Nelson-Joyce	This City Is Ours	Michael Kavanagh	BBC One
2026 (72nd)	Matt Smith	The Death of Bunny Munro	Bunny Munro	Sky Atlantic

== Actors with multiple wins and nominations ==
=== Multiple wins ===
The following people have been awarded the British Academy Television Award for Actor multiple times:

4 wins

- Michael Gambon

3 wins

- Robbie Coltrane

2 wins

- Alan Badel
- Peter Barkworth
- Sean Bean
- Alec Guinness
- Mark Rylance
- John Thaw
- Ben Whishaw

=== Multiple nominations ===
The following people have been nominated for the British Academy Television Award for Actor multiple times:

6 nominations

- Benedict Cumberbatch

5 nominations

- Robbie Coltrane

4 nominations

- Alan Bates
- Kenneth Branagh
- Albert Finney
- Michael Gambon
- Stephen Graham
- Derek Jacobi
- Ian Richardson
- Timothy Spall
- John Thaw
- Ben Whishaw

3 nominations

- Sean Bean
- Jim Broadbent
- Michael Bryant
- Colin Firth
- Alec Guinness
- Toby Jones
- Leo McKern
- Pete Postlethwaite
- Michael Sheen
- Dominic West

2 nominations

- Alan Badel
- Peter Barkworth
- Tom Bell
- Colin Blakely
- James Bolam
- Robert Carlyle
- George Cole
- Brian Cox
- Christopher Eccleston
- Taron Egerton
- Denholm Elliott
- Paapa Essiedu
- Frank Finlay
- Martin Freeman
- John Gielgud
- Robert Hardy
- Bernard Hill
- Ian Holm
- Anthony Hopkins
- John Hurt
- Robert Lindsay
- Ray McAnally
- James Nesbitt
- Gary Oldman
- Laurence Olivier
- Tim Pigott-Smith
- Mark Rylance
- John Simm
- Matt Smith
- Ken Stott
- David Suchet
- Timothy West
- Tom Wilkinson

== See also ==
- Best Actor
- List of acting awards
- List of television awards for Best Actor
