= Eric and Ernie =

2011 British television film by Jonny Campbell

- DVD cover
- Genre: Drama
- Based on: An idea by Victoria Wood
- Written by: Peter Bowker
- Directed by: Jonny Campbell
- Starring: Daniel Rigby; Bryan Dick; Victoria Wood; Reece Shearsmith; Jim Moir; Emer Kenny; Hannah Steele
- Music by: Ilan Eshkeri
- Country of origin: United Kingdom
- Original language: English

Production
- Executive producers: Piers Wenger; Beth Willis; Victoria Wood
- Producer: Tim Bricknell
- Cinematography: Tony Slater Ling
- Editor: Jamie Pearson
- Running time: 89 minutes
- Production companies: BBC Wales; Blue Door Adventures

Original release
- Network: BBC Two
- Release: 1 January 2011

Eric and Ernie is a 2011 British television drama film based on the early career of the British comic double-act Morecambe and Wise. The film was produced by BBC Wales, completed in 2010, and premiered on BBC Two on 1 January 2011. It was watched by 6.65 million viewers. Since then, it has been repeated several times on Gold.

== Plotline ==
Several years before World War II, Ernie Wiseman, a precocious and confident child performer, is signed up by influential impresario Jack Hylton. In Morecambe, pushy stage mother Sadie Bartholomew drags her slightly reluctant son Eric, an eccentric dancer, from one audition to the next until he too is employed by Hylton. At first glance the boys do not initially get on but Sadie sees a way to use their cross-talk to form a bantering double act, originally known as Bartholomew and Wise. But as time goes on, Sadie comes to the conclusion that their name is stopping them from getting noticed, so after reading the local newspaper, The Morecambe Visitor, she suggests that they should change their name to Morecambe and Wise.

After war service, they become successful on stage and on radio; but their attempt to crack the new medium of television is a disaster because they have been forced to accept a script which will make their Northernness acceptable to Southern viewers. As a result, the duo go their own ways and split up. However, Sadie knows that their formula will work and pushes Eric, now married to dancer Joan, into contacting Ernie, who is married to dancer Doreen. They decide to reform, and to completely rewrite their own act that would become one of the most successful performing duos ever in British comedy.

== Cast ==
In credits order:

- Victoria Wood as Sadie Bartholomew, Eric's mother
- Daniel Rigby as Eric Morecambe
- Bryan Dick as Ernie Wise
- Jim Moir as George Bartholomew, Eric's father
- Reece Shearsmith as Harry Wiseman, Ernie's father
- Emer Kenny as Joan Bartlett, Eric's wife
- Hannah Steele as Doreen Blythe, Ernie's wife
- Josh Benson as Little Ernie
- Thomas Atkinson as Little Eric
- Thomas Aldersley as club MC
- Ted Robbins as Jack Hylton
- Jonah Lees as young Eric
- Harry McEntire as young Ernie
- Ria Jones as boarding house landlady
- Pam Shaw as Lily
- Esmé Bianco as naked showgirl

== Filming locations ==
Amongst the locations used for filming include:

- Stockport Plaza and New Mills Art Theatre for the various theatre interior shots
- O2 Apollo Manchester as Shepherd's Bush Empire for the filming of their first TV series Running Wild (1954 TV series)
- Stockport for the various outdoor shots
- Stockport Air Raid Shelters
- Morecambe
- Morecambe Winter Gardens where Ernie performed his solo tap dance routines
- East Lancashire Railway
- Victoria Baths
- Freemasons Hall Manchester

== Awards ==
Daniel Rigby won the BAFTA TV Award for Best Actor at the 2011 BAFTAs for his performance as Eric Morecambe.
