= List of awards and nominations received by Simon Russell Beale =

Sir Simon Russell Beale awards and nominations
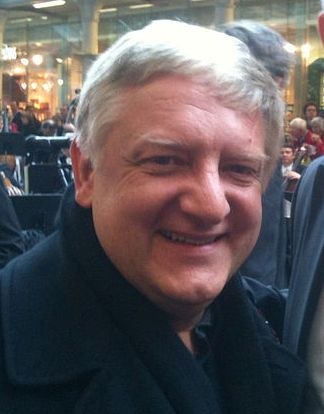
- Beale in 2011
Awards and nominations
Award	Wins	Nominations
BAFTA Awards	2	2
Olivier Awards	3	10
Tony Awards	1	2

Totals (Note: Certain award groups do not simply award one winner. They acknowledge several different recipients, have runners-up, and have third place. Since this is a specific recognition and is different from losing an award, runner-up mentions are considered wins in this award tally. For simplification and to avoid errors, each award in this list has been presumed to have had a prior nomination.)
- Wins: 21
- Nominations: 32

This article is a list of awards and nominations received by Simon Russell Beale

Sir Simon Russell Beale is an English actor of stage and screen. He has received numerous accolades including two BAFTA Awards, three Laurence Olivier Awards and a Tony Award. For his services to drama, he was appointed a Commander of the Most Excellent Order of the British Empire (CBE) in the 2003 Birthday Honours and was made a knighted by Queen Elizabeth II in the 2019 Birthday Honours.

Beale gained acclaim and notoriety for his numerous roles on the West End stage. He has received three Laurence Olivier Awards for Best Actor in a Supporting Role for playing Mosca in the Ben Jonson play Volpone (1996), Best Actor in a Musical for playing Voltaire / Dr. Pangloss in the operetta Candide (2000), and Best Actor in a Play for playing the title role in the Anton Chekov play Uncle Vanya (2003). Beale was further Olivier-nominated for his performances in The Man of Mode / Restoration / Playing with Trains / Some Americans Abroad (1990), Troilus and Cressida (1992), The Tempest (1995), Othello (1998), Hamlet (2001), Humble Boy (2002), and The Lehman Trilogy (2019).

For his work on the Broadway stage he has received a Tony Award nomination for Best Actor in a Play for his performance as George in the Tom Stoppard play Jumpers in 2004. He portrayed Henry Lehman in the Stefano Massini epic play The Lehman Trilogy (2022), for which he on the Tony Award for Best Actor in a Play and the Outer Critics Circle Award as well as a nomination for the Drama League Award. For his roles Off Broadway he received Drama Desk Award nominations for Twelfth Night (2003), Uncle Vanya (2003), and The Winter's Tale (2009).

On television, he has received two British Academy Television Awards winning for Best Actor for playing Kenneth Widmerpool in the Channel 4 drama series A Dance to the Music of Time (1998) and for Best Supporting Actor for playing John Falstaff in the BBC / HBO limited series The Hollow Crown: Henry IV, Parts I & II (2013). On film, he portrayed Sir William Collyer in the Terence Davies romantic drama The Deep Blue Sea (2011 film) for which he was nominated for the London Film Critics Circle Award for Best Supporting Actor. He portrayed Lavrentiy Beria in Armando Iannucci's dark political historical satire The Death of Stalin (2017) for which he won the British Independent Film Award for Best Supporting Actor.

== Major associations ==
=== BAFTA Awards ===
Year	Category	Nominated work	Result	Ref.
British Academy Television Awards
1998	Best Actor	A Dance to the Music of Time	Won	
2013	Best Supporting Actor	The Hollow Crown: Henry IV, Parts I & II	Won	

=== Olivier Awards ===
Year	Category	Nominated work	Result	Ref.
1990	Best Performance in a Supporting Role	The Man of Mode, Restoration; Playing with Trains and Some Americans Abroad	Nominated	
1992	Best Actor in a Supporting Role	Troilus and Cressida	Nominated	
1995	Best Actor in a Supporting Role	The Tempest	Nominated	
1996	Best Actor in a Supporting Role	Volpone	Won	
1998	Best Actor	Othello	Nominated	
2000	Best Actor in a Musical	Candide	Won	
2001	Best Actor in a Play	Hamlet	Nominated	
2002	Best Actor in a Play	Humble Boy	Nominated	
2003	Best Actor in a Play	Uncle Vanya	Won	
2019	Best Actor in a Play	The Lehman Trilogy	Nominated	

=== Tony Awards ===
Year	Category	Nominated work	Result	Ref.
2004	Best Actor in a Play	Jumpers	Nominated	
2022	Best Actor in a Play	The Lehman Trilogy	Won	

== Theatre awards ==
Award	Year	Category	Work	Result	Ref.
Drama Desk Awards	2003	Outstanding Featured Actor in a Play	Twelfth Night	Nominated	
Drama Desk Awards	2003	Outstanding Actor in a Play	Uncle Vanya	Nominated	
Drama Desk Awards	2009	Outstanding Actor in a Play	The Winter's Tale	Nominated	
Drama League Awards	2021	Distinguished Performer Award	The Lehman Trilogy	Nominated	
Evening Standard Theatre Awards	2000	Best Actor	Hamlet	Won	
Evening Standard Theatre Awards	2002	Best Actor	Twelfth Night / Uncle Vanya	Won	
Evening Standard Theatre Awards	2005	Best Actor	The Philanthropist	Won	
Evening Standard Theatre Awards	2012	Best Actor	Collaborators	Won	
Critics' Circle Theatre Award	2000	Best Shakespearean Performance	Hamlet	Won	
Critics' Circle Theatre Award	2002	Best Actor	Twelfth Night / Uncle Vanya	Won	
Critics' Circle Theatre Award	2005	Best Actor	The Philanthropist	Won	
Critics' Circle Theatre Award	2012	Best Shakespearean Performance	Timon of Athens	Won	
Outer Critics Circle Awards	2022	Outstanding Actor in a Play	The Lehman Trilogy	Won	

== Film and television awards ==
Award	Year	Category	Work	Result	Ref.
British Independent Film Award	2017	Best Supporting Actor	The Death of Stalin	Won	
Broadcasting Press Guild Award	1998	Best Actor	A Dance to the Music of Time	Won	
Evening Standard Film Awards	2018	Best Supporting Actor	The Death of Stalin	Won	
London Film Critics' Circle Award	2011	Supporting Actor of the Year	Deep Blue Sea	Nominated	
Royal Television Society Award	1998	Best Actor - Male	A Dance to the Music of Time	Won	

== Honorary awards ==
Organizations	Year	Award	Result	Ref.
Queen Elizabeth II	2003	Commander of the Most Excellent Order of the British Empire	Honored	
Queen Elizabeth II	2019	Knight Bachelor	Honored	
Warwick	2005	Honorary Degree (Literature)	Honored	
Middle Temple	2010	Honorary Bencher	Honored	
Open University	2010	Honorary Degree (University)	Honored	
City of London	2011	Honorary Freedom of the City of London	Honored	
St. Catherine's College, Oxford	2015	Visiting Professor of Contemporary Theatre	Honored	
Royal Shakespeare Company	2018	Premio Shakespeare Award	Honored	
Somerville College, Oxford	2024	Made Honorary Fellow	Honored	
