= 1998 British Academy Television Awards =

UK television awards ceremony

- Date: 18 May 1998
- Site: Prince of Wales Theatre
- Hosted by: Bob Monkhouse

Highlights
- Best Comedy Series: I'm Alan Partridge
- Best Drama: Jonathan Creek
- Best Actor: Simon Russell Beale; A Dance to the Music of Time
- Best Actress: Daniela Nardini; This Life
- Best Comedy Performance: Steve Coogan I'm Alan Partridge

Television coverage
- Channel: ITV

The 1998 British Academy Television Awards were held on 18 May at the Prince of Wales Theatre in London. The ceremony was broadcast on ITV, hosted by Bob Monkhouse, and it was the first occasion since 1968 that the Television Awards had been held separately from the British Academy Film Awards, instead of as a joint ceremony.

== Winners and nominees ==
Winners are listed first and highlighted in boldface; the nominees are listed below.

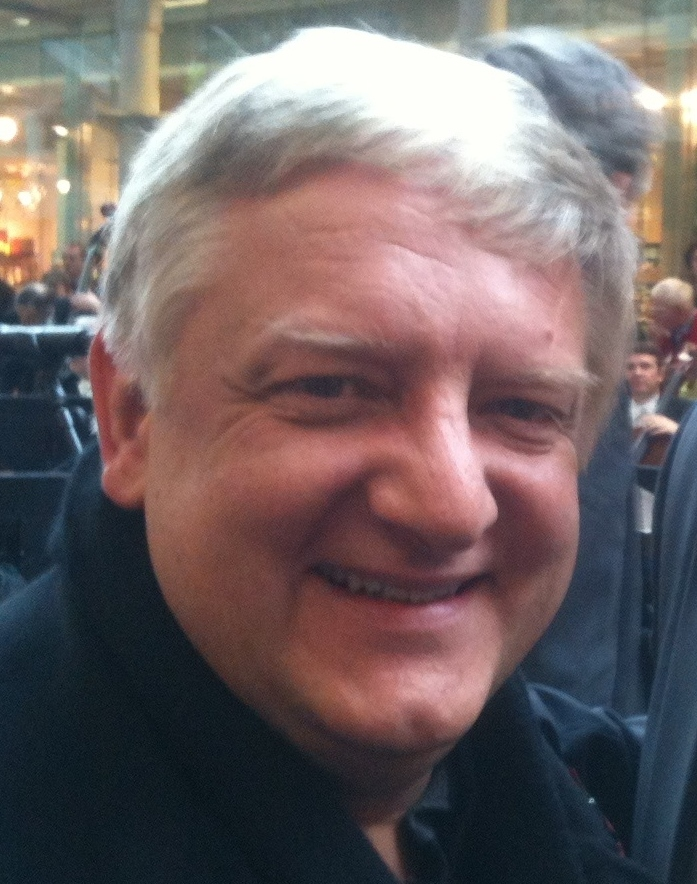
Best Actor award winner Simon Russell Beale.

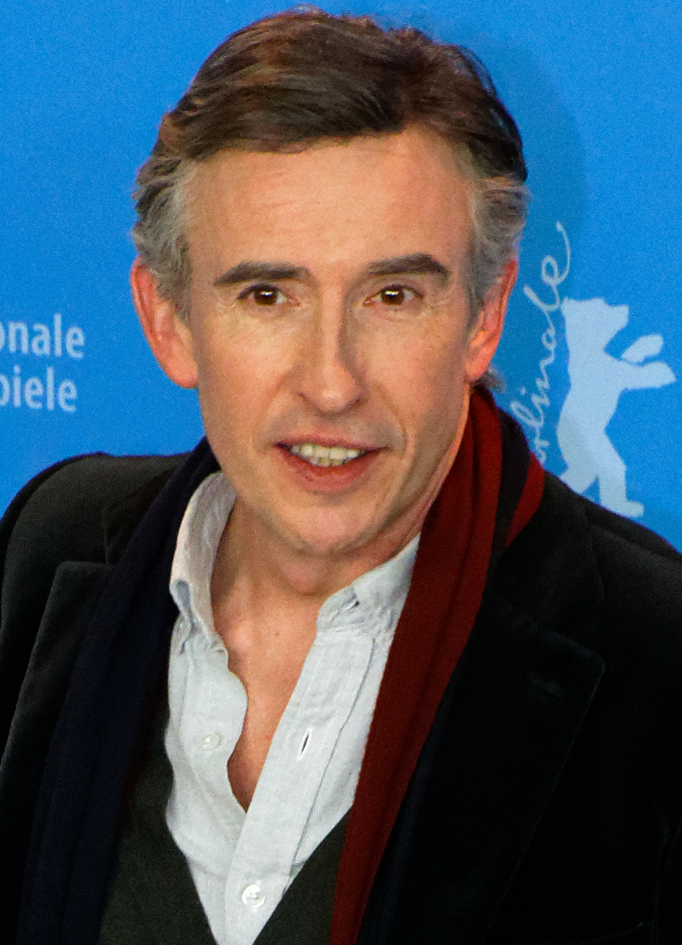
Best Comedy Performance winner Steve Coogan.

Best Drama Series	Best Drama Serial
**Holding On (BBC / BBC Two)**; The Lakes (BBC / BBC One); This Life (World Productions / BBC Two); The Woman in White (BBC / Carlton Television / WGBH / BBC One)	**Jonathan Creek (BBC / BBC One)**; Common As Muck (BBC / BBC One); Touching Evil (Granada Television / ITV); A Wing and a Prayer (Thames Television / Channel 5)
Best Actor	Best Actress
**Simon Russell Beale** – **A Dance to the Music of Time (Channel 4)**; Robert Carlyle – Hamish Macbeth (BBC One); Derek Jacobi – Breaking the Code (BBC Two); Tom Wilkinson – Cold Enough for Snow (BBC One)	**Daniela Nardini** – **This Life (BBC Two)**; Francesca Annis – Reckless (ITV); Kathy Burke – Tom Jones (BBC One); Miranda Richardson – A Dance to the Music of Time (Channel 4)
Best Comedy (Programme or Series)	Best Comedy Performance
**I'm Alan Partridge (TalkBack Productions / BBC Two)**; Men Behaving Badly (Hartswood Films / BBC One); One Foot in the Grave (BBC / BBC One); The Vicar of Dibley (Tiger Aspect Productions / BBC One)	**Steve Coogan** – **I'm Alan Partridge (BBC Two)**; Judi Dench – As Time Goes By (BBC One); Dawn French – The Vicar of Dibley (BBC One); Richard Wilson – One Foot in the Grave (BBC One)
Best Single Drama	Best Factual Series
**No Child of Mine (Meridian Broadcasting / ITV)**; Breaking the Code (BBC / The Drama House / WGBH / BBC Two); Bumping the Odds (Halcyon Productions / Wall to Wall Television Ltd); Granton Star Cause (Picture Palace North Limited / Umbrella Productions Limited / Channel 4)	**The Nazis: A Warning from History (BBC / Gosteleradio / BBC Two)**; Breaking Point; Hotel (BBC One); Royals and Reptiles
Best Light Entertainment Performance	Best Light Entertainment Programme or Series
**Paul Whitehouse** – **The Fast Show (BBC Two)**; Kathy Burke – Harry Enfield and Chums (BBC One); Harry Enfield – Harry Enfield and Chums (BBC One); Paul Merton – Have I Got News For You	**The Fast Show (BBC / BBC Two)**; Harry Enfield and Chums (Tiger Aspect Productions / BBC One); Harry Hill (Avalon Television / Channel 4); Have I Got News for You (Hat Trick Productions / BBC Two)
Best News and Current Affairs Journalism	Best Live Outside Broadcast Coverage
**Panorama - Valentina's Story (BBC / BBC One)**; BBC Election Night Programme (BBC / BBC One); Channel 4 coverage of the death of Diana, Princess of Wales (ITN / Channel 4); ITV coverage of the death of Diana, Princess of Wales (ITN / ITV)	**Rugby Union (Sky Sports)**; The Final Moment (BBC / BBC?); Grand National (BBC / BBC One); ITV Formula One Coverage (Mach1 / ITV)
Flaherty Award for Single Documentary	Huw Wheldon Award for Arts Programme or Series
**True Stories – The Grave**; Inside Story – Nazi Gold; Network First – Out of the Shadows & We are the Treasury; Wildlife (for "Polar Bear (Special)")	**The South Bank Show – Gilbert and George (London Weekend Television / ITV)**; Dancing for Dollars; Omnibus – Jack Rosenthal: Jack the Lad (BBC / BBC One); Bookmark – Stevie Smith: Not Waving But Drowning
The Lew Grade Award	The Dennis Potter Award
**A Touch of Frost**	**Kay Mellor**
The Alan Clarke Award	The Richard Dimbleby Award
**Ted Childs**	**David Dimbleby**
Foreign Programme Award
**Friends**

=== Craft Awards ===
Best Costume Design	Best Original Television Music
**Tom Jones** – **Rosalind Ebbutt**; The Woman in White – Odile Dicks-Mireaux; A Dance to the Music of Time – Dany Everett, Barbara Kidd; The Mill on the Floss – Jill Taylor	**Tom Jones** – **Jim Parker**; Holding On – Nick Bicat; The Lakes – Simon Boswell; Trial and Retribution – Evelyn Glennie
Best Design	Best Make-Up
**The Woman in White** – **Alice Normington**; Jonathan Creek – John Asbridge, Jonathan Taylor; Tom Jones – Roger Cann; A Dance to the Music of Time – Eileen Diss	**Tom Jones** – **Jean Speak**; Rory Bremner, Who Else? – Helen Barrett; The Mill on the Floss – Ann Buchanan; A Dance to the Music of Time – Mary Hillman
Best Photography - Factual	Best Photography and Lighting - Fiction
**Wildlife (for "Polar Bear (Special)")** – **Doug Allan, Martin Saunders**; Full Circle with Michael Palin – Nigel Meakin; True Stories: The Grave – Richard Ranken; Wildlife (for "Eagle (Special)") – Michael W Richards	**The Woman in White** – **Richard Greatrex**; The Lakes – Daf Hobson; Holding On – Peter Middleton, Alan Stewart; Touching Evil – David Odd
Best Editing - Factual	Best Editing - Fiction/Entertainment
**The Nazis: A Warning from History** – **Alan Lygo, James Hay**; Under The Sun: The Hunt – Erik Disselhoff, Peter Simpson; Airport – Mike Flynn, Dave Monk, Edward Bazalgette; Hotel – Guye Henderson, Richard Cox, John Thomas	**The Lakes** – **Roy Sharman**; Holding On – John Stothart; Tom Jones – Paul Tothill, Annie Kocur; Trial and Retribution – Terry Warwick
Best Sound - Factual	Best Sound - Fiction/Entertainment
**Airport** – **John Rodda, Paul Roberts**; Full Circle with Michael Palin – Fraser Barber, Victoria Trow, Kathy Rodwell, Michael Narduzzo; Hotel – Adrian Bell, Tim Watts, Paul Roberts; Great Composers – Team	**The Lakes** – **Richard Manton, Paul Hamblin, Graham Headicar, Andy Kennedy**; Tom Jones – Dennis Cartwright, Paul Hamblin, Catherine Hodgson, Graham Headicar; Touching Evil – Paul Davies, Tim Alban, Glenn Calder, Richard Flynn; Jonathan Creek – Terry Elms, Craig Irving, Laurie Taylor, Lee Chrichlow, Ben Norrington
Best Graphic Design
**Election 97** – **Michael Afford, Ceri Kashita**; The South Bank Show – Pat Gavin; The Nazis: A Warning from History – John Kennedy; People's Century – Ian Wormleighton

=== Special Award ===
- **Roger Cook**
