= I'll Be Seeing You (play) =

2026 play by Martin Sherman

- Official Poster of the 2026 Pitlochry production.
- Original language: English
- Written by: Martin Sherman

Premiere
- Date: 26 September 2026
- Place: Pitlochry Festival Theatre, Scotland
- Directed by: Alan Cumming; Ben Occhipinti

I'll Be Seeing You is a fantasia style play by Martin Sherman. It premiered at the Pitlochry Festival Theatre in September 2026, directed by Alan Cumming and Ben Occhipinti, the. The play centers around the life of Liberace, and was staged with the blessing of the Liberace Foundation.

== Synopsis ==
A young gay writer is commissioned to write a play about Liberace, but in doing so battles with his own distaste for what he deems Liberace to represent. After deciding to focus on Liberace's denial that he was gay, and in turn suing the Daily Mirror to prove he wasn't, he is visited by Liberace himself.

== Background ==
I'll Be Seeing You is written by Martin Sherman, with direction from Alan Cumming and Ben Occhipinti. The play revolves and asks questions around the sexuality of Liberace, with focus on the outcome of the 1959 Liberace v Daily Mirror court case.

William Connor writing for The Mirror called Liberace:

the summit of sex—the pinnacle of masculine, feminine and neuter. Everything that he, she and it can ever want...a deadly, winking, sniggering, snuggling, chromium-plated, scent-impregnated, luminous, quivering, giggling, fruit-flavoured, mincing, ice-covered heap of mother love".

— William Connor,

On 13 November 2025, it was announced that the play would receive its world premiere as part of Alan Cumming's debut season as artistic director at Pitlochry Festival Theatre. Sherman began writing the play around 2016, with the aim of premiering I'll Be Seeing You in London. With the production delayed due to the COVID-19 pandemic, and interest from Cumming the play ultimately was selected to debut in Pitlochry. Sherman described it as the most surreal play he had ever written.

As part of his research for the show Cumming visited the chairman of the Liberace Foundation at Hollywood’s Chateau Marmont to get their support for the production, as well as visiting the Liberace Museum Collection at Thriller Villa.

The original production featured design by Tim Hatley, sound design by co-director Ben Occhipinti, lighting by Grant Anderson, and choreography by Chris Stuart Wilson. Jonathan Warren chairman of the Liberace foundation acted as a historical content consultant.

The play was published by Methuen Drama on 30 September 2026.

== Production ==
The original production began performances in the main theatre at Pitlochry Festival Theatre on 22 September 2026, for a limited run until 11 October 2026. The play had originally been due to run 12 September to 11 October in the venues studio theatre.

Lead casting included Simon Russell Beale as Liberace, with Fra Fee and Martin Sherman playing the role of the writer. At the age of eighty-seven the play's playwright Martin Sherman, was appearing in his first professional acting role. His role in the play was suggested by director Alan Cumming, and initially resisted by Sherman.

A typical performance in Pitlochry ran one hour and twenty minutes, with no interval.

== Cast and characters ==
| Character | World Premiere |
| Character | 2026 |
|---|---|
| Liberace | Simon Russell Beale |
| Writer | Fra Fee |
| Mother/Heidi | Anne Lacey |
| Chauffeur/Hunk | Ali Watt |
| Hunk | Adam Kashmiry |
| Writer | Martin Sherman |

== Critical reception ==
The world premiere production received mostly positive reviews.
