= Oliver Ford Davies =

English actor (born 1939)

Oliver Ford Davies OBE
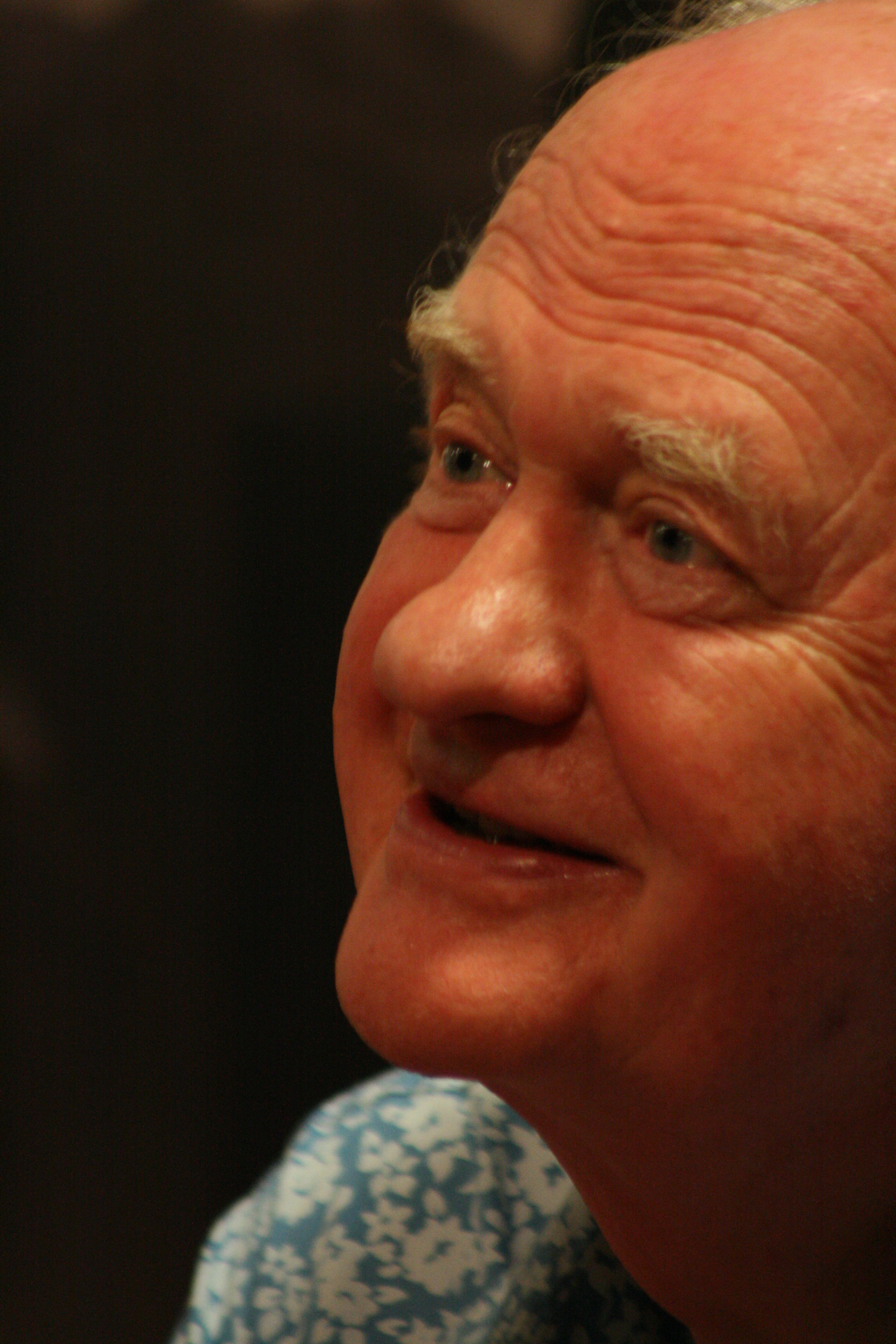
- Davies in 2008
- Born: Oliver Robert Ford Davies; 12 August 1939 (age 87); Ealing, Middlesex, England
- Occupations: Actor, writer
- Years active: 1959–present

Oliver Robert Ford Davies OBE (born 12 August 1939) is an English actor, theatre historian, director, playwright, and writer. He is best known for his extensive theatre work, and to a broader audience for his role as Sio Bibble in Star Wars Episodes I to III. He is also known for his roles as Peter Foxcott in the ITV legal drama Kavanagh QC and as Maester Cressen in HBO's epic fantasy series Game of Thrones.

== Early life and education ==
Oliver Robert Ford Davies (Note: Note that his surname is given as Ford Davies in The Gazette and a 2003 theatre review of Absolutely (Perhaps) in the British Theatre Guide (and possibly others), but most sources and library catalogue entries use just Davies as the surname.) was born in Ealing, Middlesex, England, on 12 August 1939. His father was a teacher.

Aged 11, he performed in a school play, Richard of Bordeaux, and found that he "liked being someone else". In 1956 he joined the eminent Ealing amateur company Questors. He won a scholarship to Merton College, Oxford, where he read history and became president of the Oxford University Dramatic Society. After obtaining his DPhil, he did a postgraduate teaching qualification.

From 1964, Davies worked as a history lecturer at the University of Edinburgh before taking up acting professionally in 1967, "to give acting a go". Among his students was Robin Cook, a future British Foreign Secretary.

== Acting career ==
=== Stage ===
In 1959, as a member of the Oxford University Experimental Theatre Club, Davies appeared in his first Stratford performance in the Memorial Theatre's open-air production of Bartholomew Fair.

His first professional appearances were, at the age of 27, in the 1967 season at the Birmingham Repertory Theatre – which at that time included Michael Gambon, Brian Cox, Timothy Dalton, and Anna Calder-Marshall. Short Seasons at the Mermaid, London, the Oxford Playhouse and the Cambridge Arts Theatre followed. Davies' long and prolific association with the Royal Shakespeare Company started in 1975, when director Terry Hands cast him as Mountjoy in Henry V. His breakthrough in theatre came in 1990, when he was given the lead role in Sir David Hare's Racing Demon at the Royal National Theatre in London.

In 2002, Davies played King Lear in an Almeida Theatre production. The following year, he played opposite Joan Plowright in Absolutely! (perhaps), an adaptation of Pirandello's Cosi e (se vi pare) by Martin Sherman. Franco Zeffirelli directed the play for Wyndham's Theatre and the Theatre Royal Haymarket.

In 2008, he appeared on stage as Polonius in Hamlet with the Royal Shakespeare Company (RSC), alongside David Tennant and Patrick Stewart. The cast were once again assembled to create a film version, which was broadcast on television in December 2009. In May 2009, Davies appeared in All's Well That Ends Well at the Royal National Theatre as the King of France. In 2010, he appeared at the Orange Tree Theatre as Balfour in the premiere of Ben Brown's play The Promise, about the Balfour Declaration.

In 2011, he appeared in a stage adaptation of Michelle Magorian's book Goodnight Mister Tom, in which he played the central character, Thomas Oakley. He was back with the RSC in 2014 as Justice Shallow in Henry IV, Part 2. Davies again appeared with David Tennant in Richard II in 2013. In 2019, Davies played the Button Moulder in David Hare's adaptation of Henryk Ibsen's Peter Gynt at the Olivier Theatre.

=== Screen ===
On television, Davies had a regular role as Peter Foxcott QC in Kavanagh QC and was schoolmaster Le Bas in the serialisation of A Dance to the Music of Time (1997). He also appeared with John Thaw in an episode of Inspector Morse and also appeared in the ITV television drama The Uninvited, and in a 2002 episode of the popular drama Foyle's War.

On film, his most prominent role was Sio Bibble in the Star Wars prequel trilogy films, released in 1999, 2002 and 2005. In 2003, Davies appeared in the film Johnny English, where he portrayed the Archbishop of Canterbury. He appeared as Maester Cressen in the TV series Game of Thrones.

== Writing ==
=== Non-fiction ===
Davies' books include Playing Lear (2003), an account of his experience while performing King Lear at the Almeida Theatre, and Performing Shakespeare (2007, republished 2019). Both are published by Nick Hern Books.

Davies wrote and published his memoir, An Actor's Life in 12 Productions, in 2022 through The Book Guild publishing.

=== Play ===
Davies' drama King Cromwell was staged at the Orange Tree Theatre, Richmond, in November 2003. The director was Sam Walters and Davies himself took the title role.

== Other activities ==
Davies is a theatre historian and was a university lecturer before devoting himself to acting full-time. In February 2019, he discussed his career in the BBC Radio Three series Private Passions.

== Recognition and honours ==
Davies was awarded the Laurence Olivier Award in 1990 (1989 season) for Best Actor in a New Play for Racing Demon. He was twice nominated for a Laurence Olivier Theatre Award for Best Performance in a Supporting Role for his performance in Absolutely! (perhaps) at the Wyndham's Theatre in 2003, and again in 2009 for his performance as Polonius in the RSC production of Hamlet at the Novello Theatre.

Davies is an Honorary Associate Artist of the Royal Shakespeare Company.

In 2023, Davies' book, An Actor's Life in 12 Productions published by The Book Guild in November 2022, won the Society for Theatre Research's 2023 STR Theatre Book Prize, and was well-reviewed by actor and theatre director Andrew Hilton.

He was appointed Officer of the Order of the British Empire (OBE) in the 2024 New Year Honours for services to drama.

== Personal life and views ==
Davies is left wing politically, and an internationalist. He has said that the actor he most admires is Paul Scofield, in particular his portrayal of King Lear in 1962.

== Selected filmography ==
=== Films ===
- Defence of the Realm (1986) – Anthony Clegg
- Scandal (1989) – Mr. Woods, MI5
- Paper Mask (1990) – Coroner
- Sense and Sensibility (1995) – Doctor Harris
- Mrs Brown (1997) – Dean of Windsor
- Mrs Dalloway (1997) – Hugh Whitbread
- Titanic Town (1998) – Whittington
- An Ideal Husband (1999) – Sir Hugo Danforth
- Star Wars: Episode I – The Phantom Menace (1999) – Sio Bibble
- Blow Dry (2001) – Doctor Hamilton
- Just Visiting (2001) – Pit Rivers
- Revelation (2001) – Professor Casaubon
- Sunday (2002) – Lord Hailsham
- Bertie and Elizabeth (2002) – Cosmo Gordon Lang
- Star Wars: Episode II – Attack of the Clones (2002) – Sio Bibble
- Johnny English (2003) – Archbishop of Canterbury
- The Mother (2003) – Bruce
- Agatha Christie's Sparkling Cyanide (2003) - Colonel Geoffrey Reece
- Gladiatress (2004) – (uncredited)
- Star Wars: Episode III – Revenge of the Sith (2005) – Sio Bibble
- Heidi (2005) – Dr. Classen
- National Theatre Live: All's Well That Ends Well (2009) – King of France
- The Deep Blue Sea (2011) – Hester's Father
- Royal Shakespeare Company: Henry IV Part II (2014) – Shallow
- The Last Witness (2018) – Sir Alexander Cadogan / Anthony Eden / Owen O'Malley (voice)
- Christopher Robin (2018) – Old Man Winslow
- A Splinter of Ice (2021) – Graeme Greene
- Triangle of Sadness (2022) – Winston

=== TV ===
- The Protectors (1973) – Hansen, episode "Bagman"
- The Brontes of Haworth (1973) – John Hunter Thompson, "Home and Abroad"
- Father Brown (1974) – Det. Insp. Corliss, episode "The Eye of Apollo"
- A Taste for Death (1988 mini-series) – Father Francis Barnes, 6 episodes
- A Very British Coup (1988 mini-series) – Sir Horace Tweed, 3 episodes
- Inspector Morse (1991) – Frederick Redpath, episode "Second Time Around" (S05:E01)
- Maigret (1992 TV series) – Dr. Pardon, episode "Maigret on the Defensive" (S02:E03)
- The Way We Live Now (1997) - Gerald Ryle, 2 episodes
- A Dance to the Music of Time (1997) – Le Bas, "Post War", "The Twenties"
- Pie in the Sky (1997) – James Truman, MP, episode "Squashed Tomatoes" (S05:E01)
- Heartbeat (1999) – Henry Tomkinson, episode "Testament"
- Kavanagh QC (1999-2001) – Peter Foxcott QC, 26 episodes
- Agatha Christie's Poirot (2000) – Dr. James Sheppard, "The Murder of Roger Ackroyd"
- The Way We Live Now (2001) - Mr Longestaffe, 4 episodes
- Jack and the Beanstalk: The Real Story (2001) - Dr Newman, 2 episodes
- Murder (2002) - Father Daniel, 4 episodes
- Sirens (2002) - Henry Marshall, 2 episodes
- Foyle's War (2002) – Lawrence Gascoigne, "A Lesson in Murder" (S01:E3)
- Midsomer Murders (2005 TV series) – Otto Benham, episode "Hidden Depths" (S08:E06)
- Waking the Dead (2007) – Hugo Keegan, "The Fall" Parts 1 & 2
- Game of Thrones (2012) – Maester Cressen, episode "The North Remembers" (S02:E01)
- Agatha Christie's Marple (2013) – Major Palgrave, "A Caribbean Mystery"
- You, Me and the Apocalypse (2015) – Cardinal Crawshaw "24 Hours to Go", "Saviour Day"
- Catastrophe (2017) – Wallace, episode 3.3
- Father Brown (2018) – Bishop Golding, episode "The Two Deaths of Hercule Flambeau" (S06:E10)
- Departure (2020) – Amis, episode "Prime Suspect" (S01:E03)
- Casualty (2024) – Ziggy Rustin, episode "The Truth Will Set You Free" (S39:E05)
