= Liberace Museum Collection =

Former private museum collection

Liberace Museum
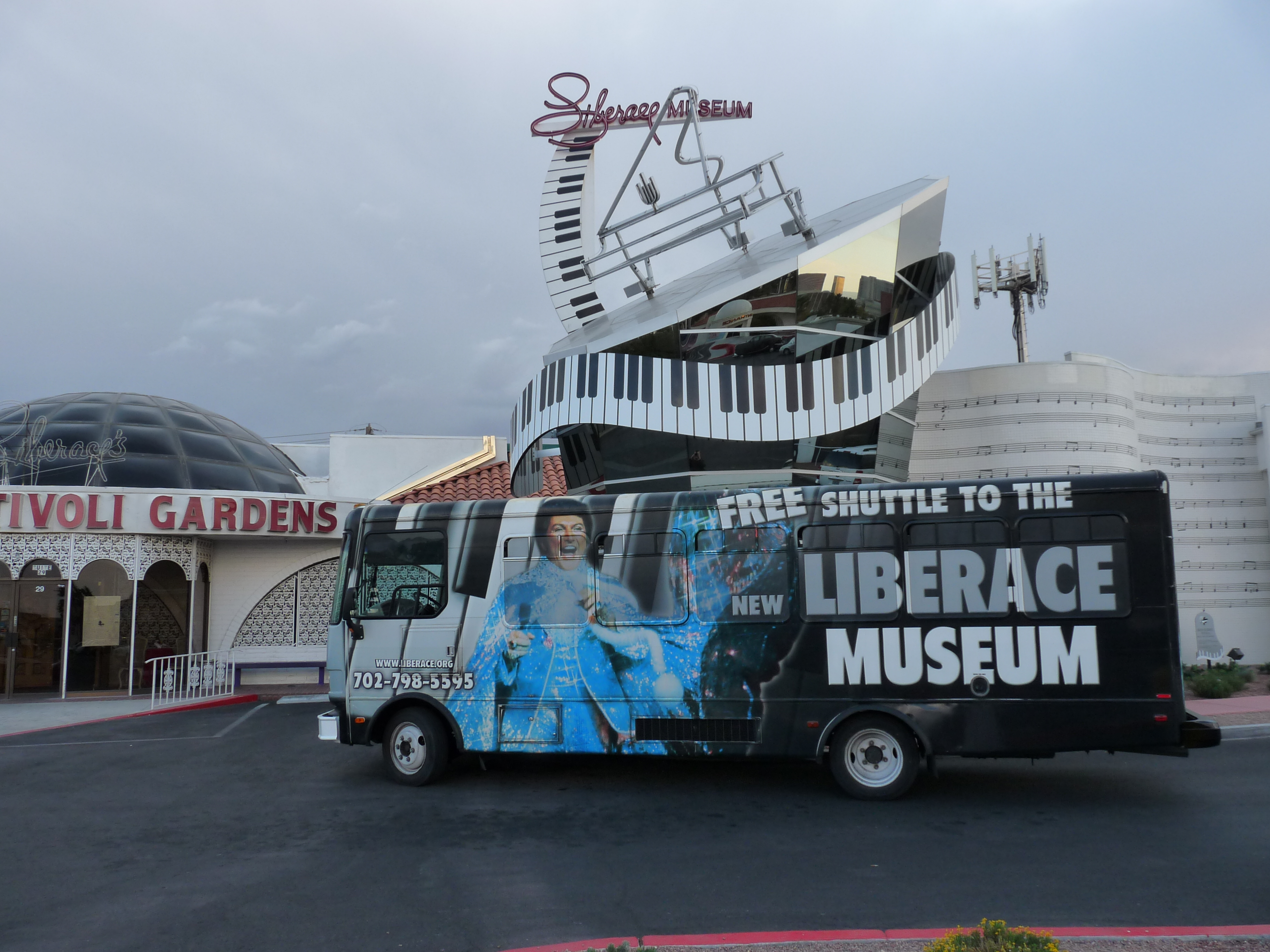
- Shuttle and museum exterior (2009)
- Established: April 15, 1979
- Dissolved: October 17, 2010
- Location: 5115 Dean Martin Dr; Paradise, Nevada
- Coordinates: 36°06′02.5″N 115°07′42.3″W
- Founder: Liberace
- Director: George Liberace; Dora Liberace
- Owners: Liberace Foundation for the Creative and Performing Arts

The Liberace Museum Collection is a private museum collection that includes many stage costumes, cars, jewelry, lavishly decorated pianos and numerous citations for philanthropic acts that belonged to the American entertainer and pianist Władziu Valentino Liberace, better known as Liberace.

Originally exhibited in the former Liberace Museum located in Paradise, Nevada, the Liberace Foundation for the Creative and Performing Arts later housed the primary collection of Liberace's outfits at Thriller Villa, the former Las Vegas home of Michael Jackson, and displayed Liberace’s automobiles, related artifacts and occasional special exhibits at the Liberace Garage in Las Vegas. Liberace Garage doubled its square footage to approximately 10,000 in 2020, now facilitating storage of the entire Liberace Museum Collection, as well as exhibit space.

== History ==
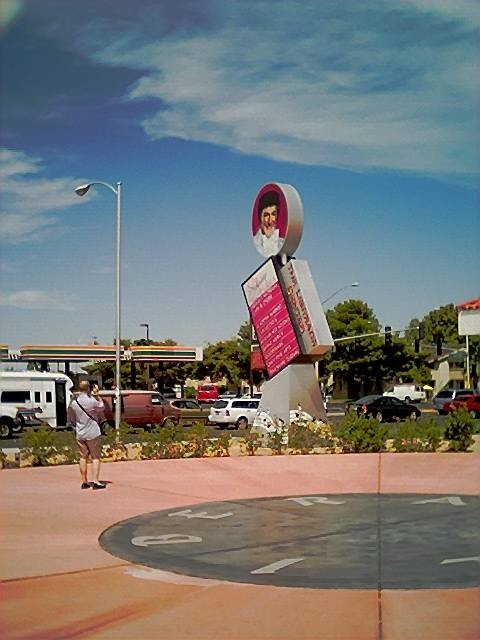
Liberace Plaza and Museum roadside sign (2003)

The Liberace Foundation for Creative and Performing Arts was founded in 1976; Liberace endowed the foundation with its collection along with $4 million in cash. He stated his hope for the foundation to return his good fortune to musicians starting on their careers. The foundation acquired the entire shopping plaza on the southwest corner of Tropicana and Spencer, which would later be renamed the Liberace Plaza. The plaza contained both the museum and Tivoli Gardens, a restaurant designed and operated by Liberace.

Liberace himself opened the Liberace Museum on April 15, 1979, in Paradise, Nevada, a census-designated place in the Las Vegas Valley. Admission to the museum cost $3.50. His brother George became the director and later George's wife, Dora, assumed that role. The museum had several buildings showcasing Liberace's unique costumes, pianos, cars, jewelry and artifacts. At its peak, the museum attracted 450,000 visitors per year, and was the third most-visited tourist attraction in Nevada, after the Las Vegas Strip and Hoover Dam.

The museum was expanded in 1988, tripling its size by expanding into the office, library, and apartment spaces in the plaza. The collection was housed in three buildings: the main building, displaying most of the pianos and automobiles; the annex, with Liberace's bedroom (recreated from his Palm Springs house), jewelry, personal items, a mirrored Baldwin grand, and his on-stage capes and costumes, many designed by Michael Travis; and the library, containing Liberace's musical arrangements, his archives, and a tribute to his family.

The annual Liberace "Play-A-Like" Competition was started by the foundation in 1993 to mark Liberace's birthday; competitors were expected to embody "Liberace's joyful spirit of showmanship and entertainment ability" through their choice of music and costume. The competition was held at the Liberace Museum. It was expanded in 2006 as the Liberace Piano Competition to encompass traditional performances, and the young musicians could choose to play either a traditional Steinway grand or Liberace's rhinestone-studded Baldwin grand. By 2008, the competition had outgrown the space at the museum and the finals were held at the Community Lutheran Church.

In 1995, 18 pianos were on display, including historically significant instruments that had previously been played by Frédéric Chopin (finished in green-and-gold, built by Ignaz Pleyel in the early 1800s), Robert Schumann (built by Bösendorfer), and George Gershwin (built by Chickering & Sons), as well as an early piano designed by John Broadwood dated to 1788. The rhinestone-decorated Baldwin grand that Liberace had debuted for his sold-out Radio City Music Hall concerts in 1986 was also on display. Admission fees had risen modestly to $6.50 for adults.

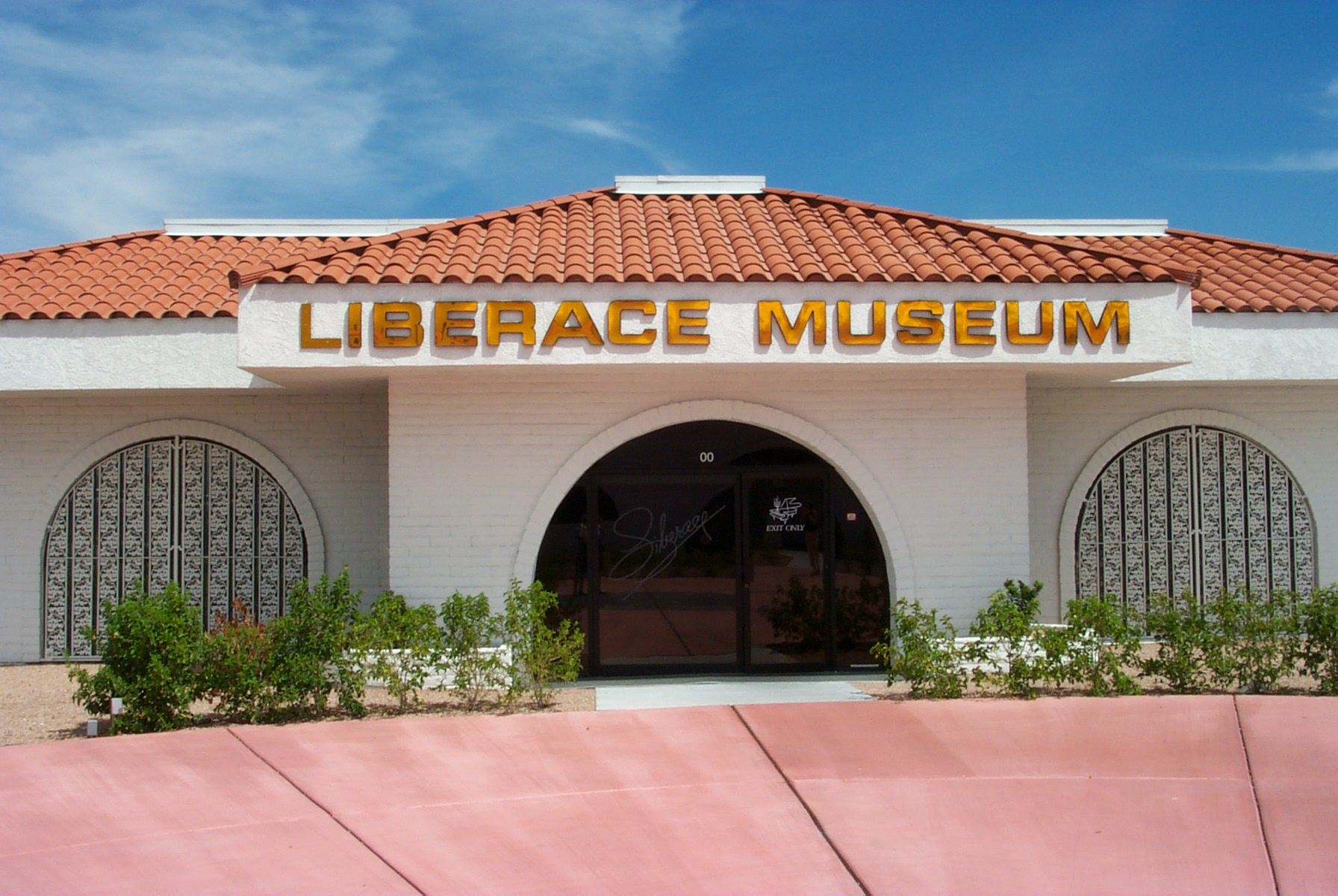
Liberace Museum, Las Vegas (2003)

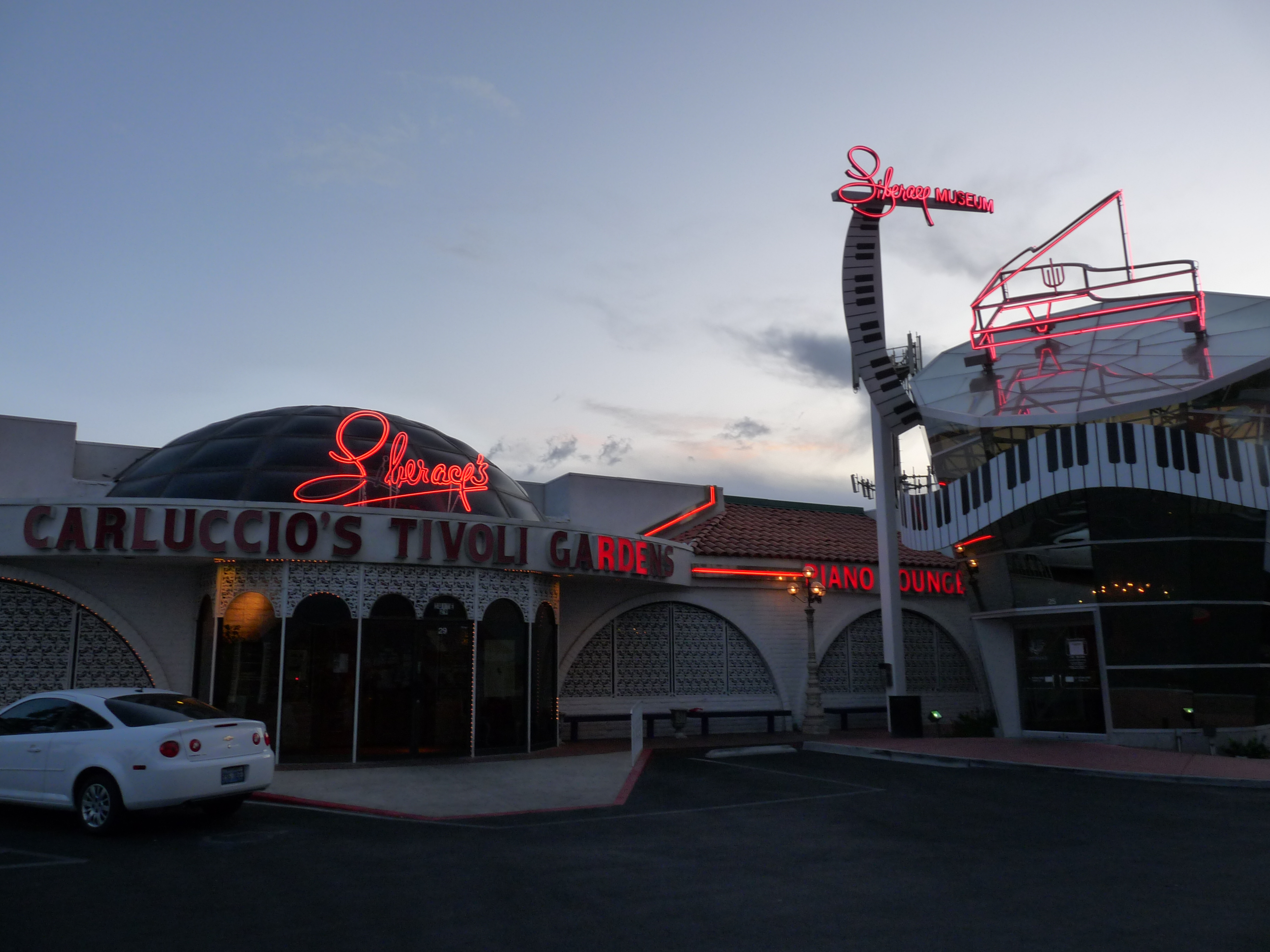
Neon-lit signs for the Liberace Museum and associated restaurant Tivoli Gardens. Both were operated by Liberace; the museum closed in 2010, and the restaurant moved shortly thereafter.

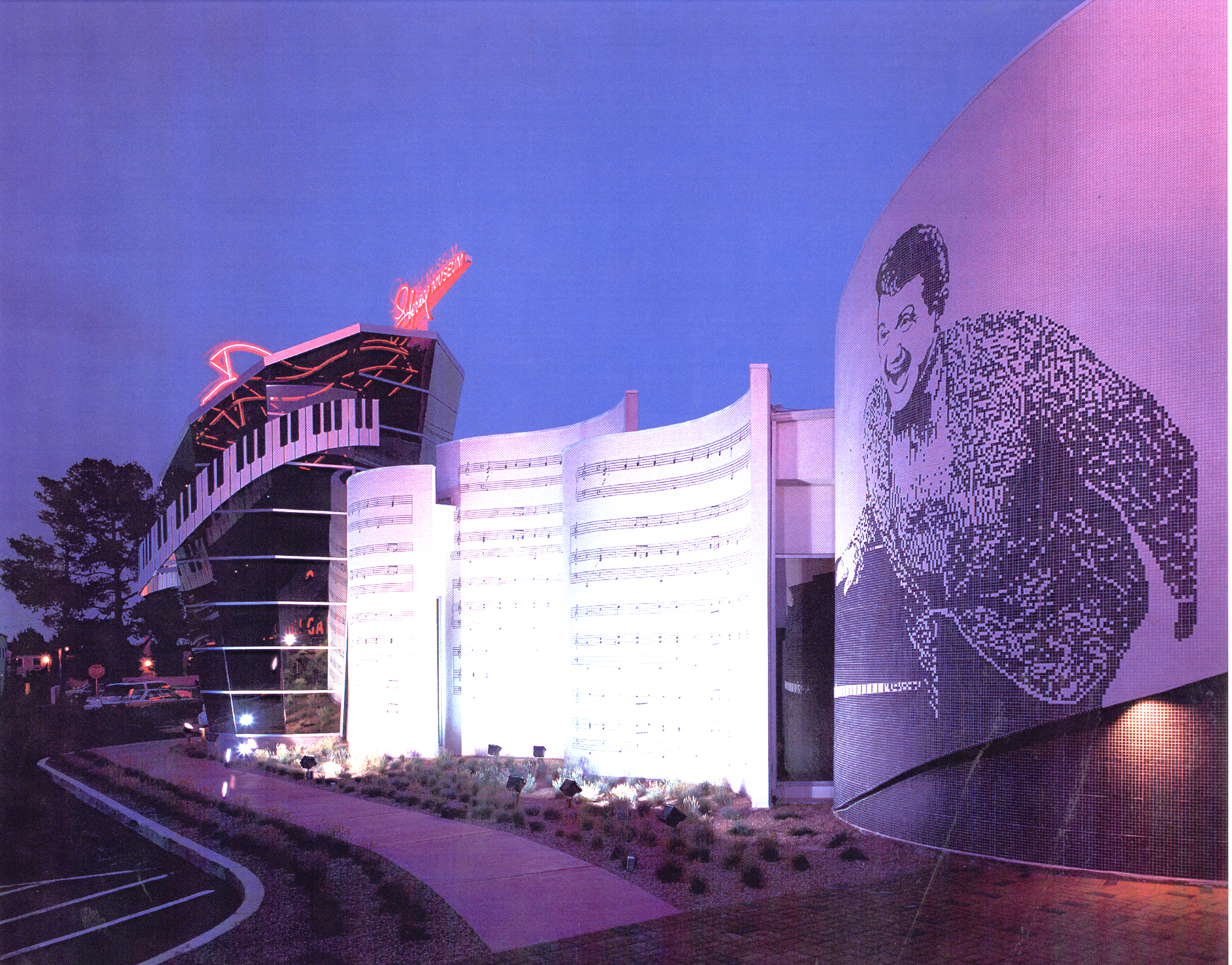
Exterior "Wall of Music" decoration (c. 2000s)

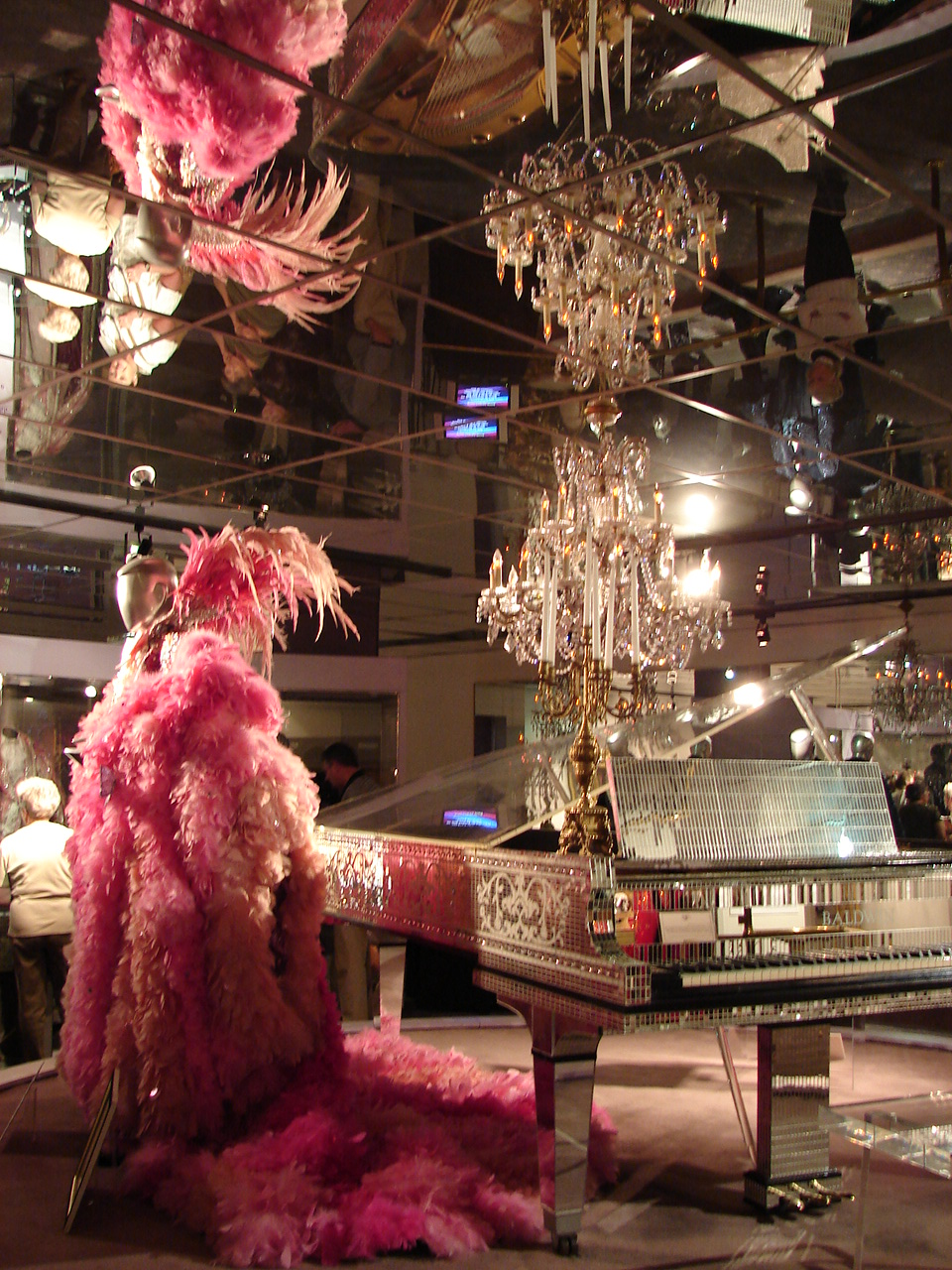
Museum annex interior with mirrored Baldwin (2007)

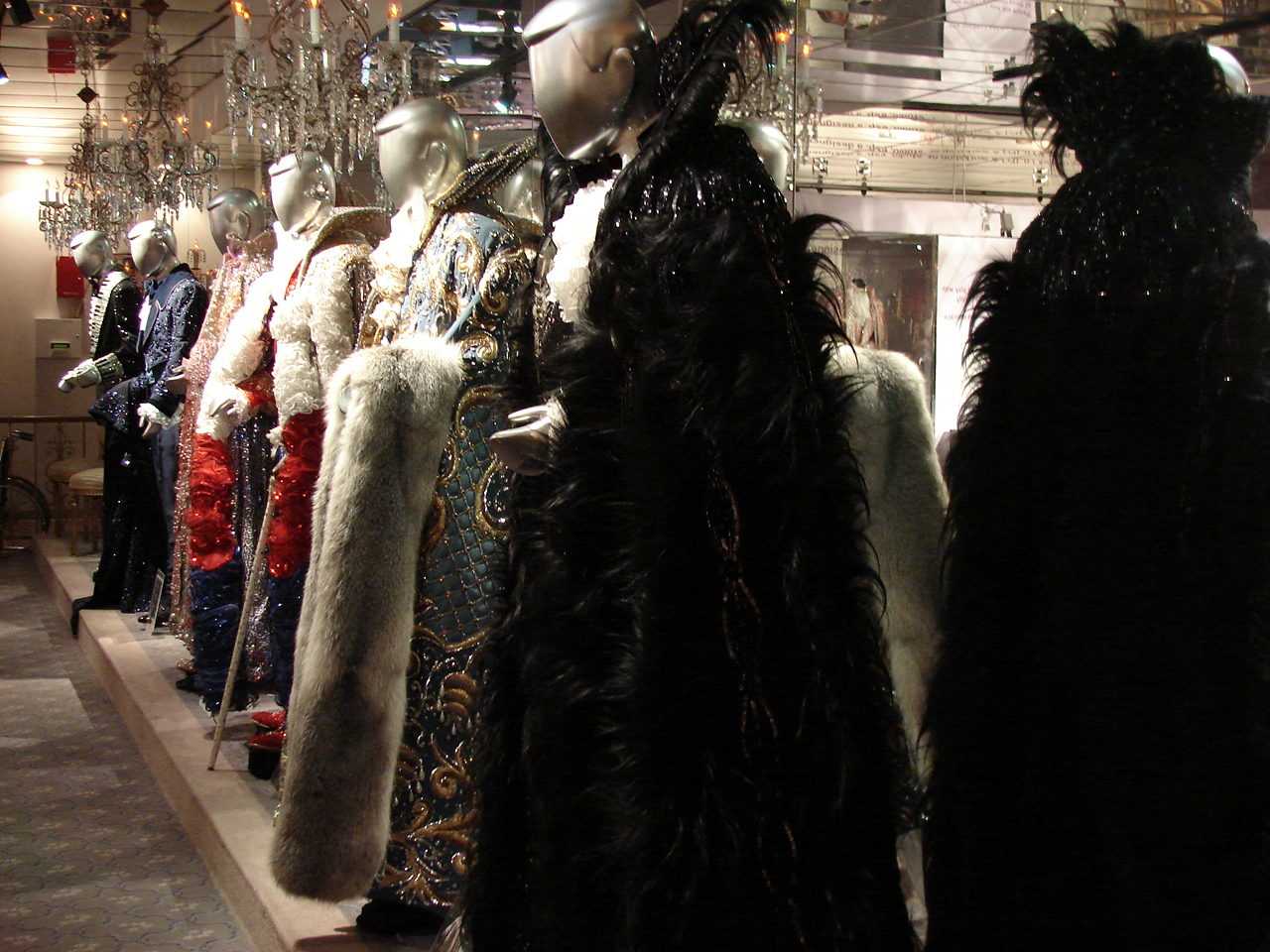
Liberace's costumes (2007)

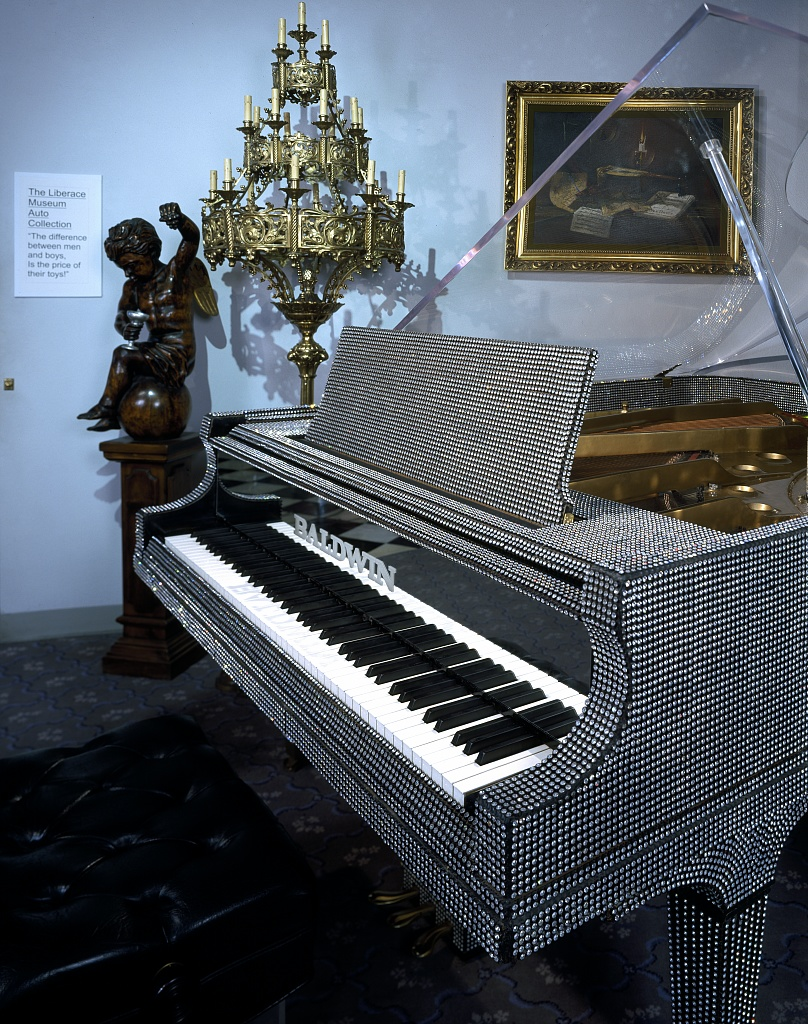
Rhinestone Baldwin and candelabra, by Carol Highsmith

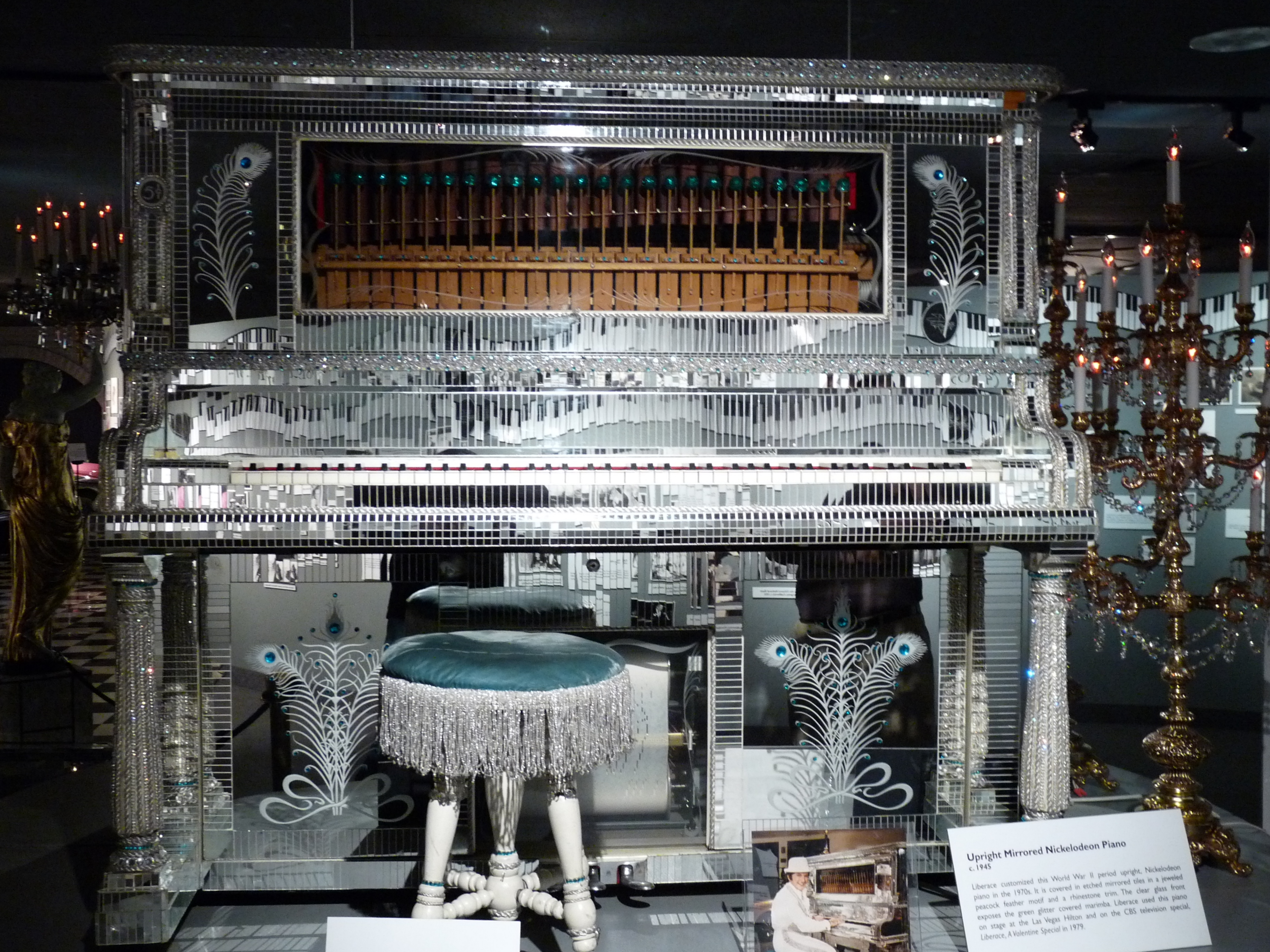
Mirrored upright piano (2009)

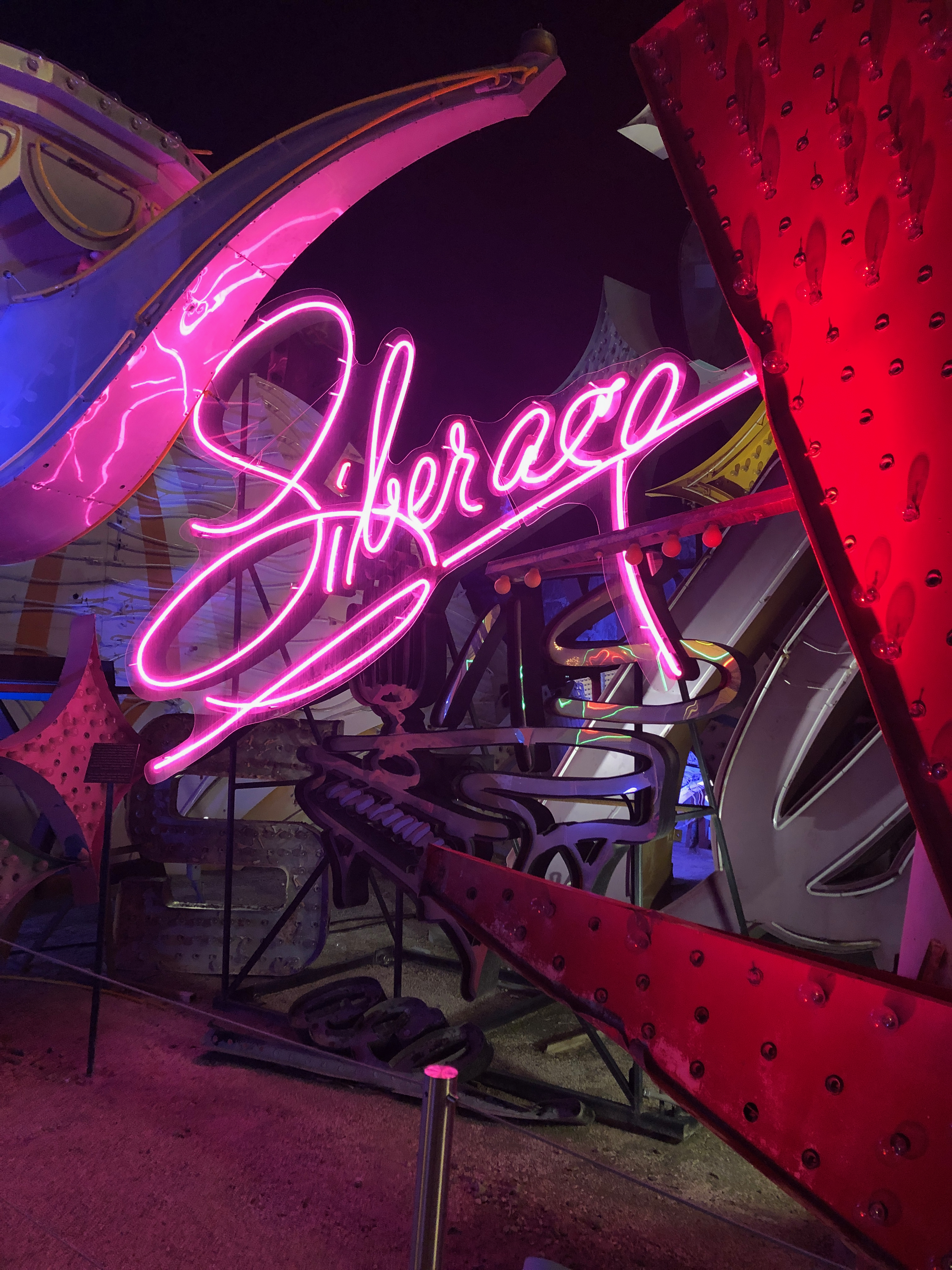
Sign at the Neon Museum boneyard (2019)

All the proceeds of the museum benefited the Liberace Foundation, which provided 2,700 scholarships to college and graduate students totaling more than $6 million. In 2000, the Foundation took out a $2 million loan to renovate the plaza and museum; the renovation added 6,000 square feet (560 m^{2}) to the museum to accommodate traveling exhibits, bringing the total size to 21,000 square feet (2,000 m^{2}). It also added the round glass entrance and neon signs, cafe, and a Walk of Honors. Siegfried and Roy hosted the grand re-opening ceremonies in 2002, which was also attended by Charo and Lieutenant Governor Lorraine Hunt.

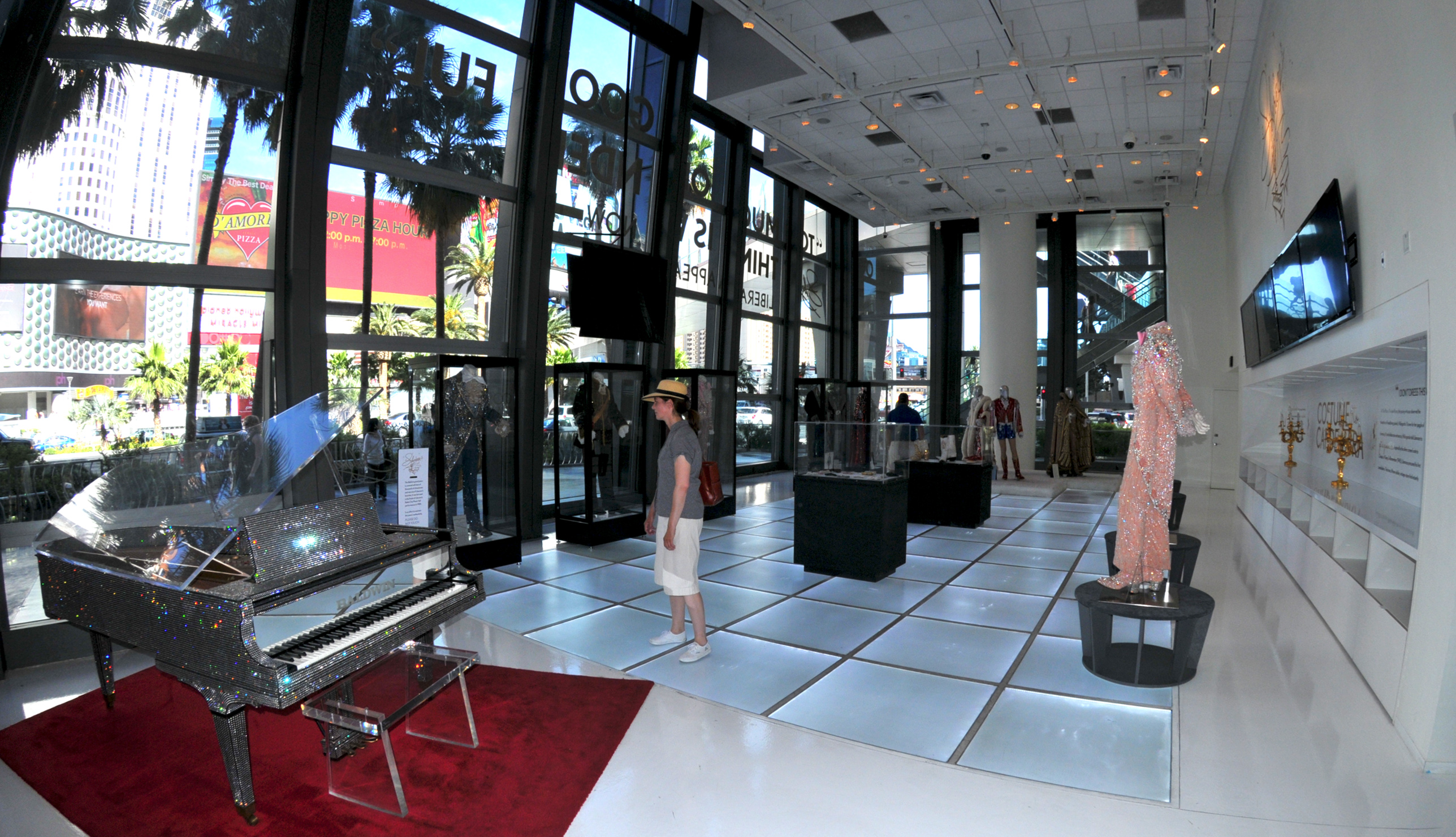
Liberace exhibition at Cosmopolitan

The 30-year loan carried both a 9.5% interest rate and penalties for early repayment; expenses outpaced revenue for seven of the ten years between 1998 and 2008, driven by falling attendance (in 2002, attendance had dropped to a quarter of its peak at 100,000 per year, and by October 2010, just 36,000 had visited that year) and lost income from vacant storefronts in the Plaza. The reduced revenues would force the Foundation to subsidize museum operations from its dwindling endowment. In 2008, the Foundation awarded a total of $112,000 in scholarships; that dropped to $62,000 in 2009.

In January 2010, Jack Rappaport, the director of the museum, announced it would be moving to the Strip. However, the Liberace Foundation announced it would close the museum in September and on October 17, 2010, the Liberace Museum closed "indefinitely, but not forever" according to Liberace Foundation Board of Directors Chairman Jeffrey Koep. Koep stated the museum would continue to exhibit costumes from the collection as a traveling show under the management of Exhibits Development Group after its closure.

== Present-day locations and exhibitions ==
Key locations of the Liberace Museum Collection
1 (former) Liberace Plaza, Museum and Restaurant; 1775 E Tropicana Ave
2 Thriller Villa, 2710 Palomino Ln
3 Hollywood Car Museum, 5115 Dean Martin Dr

The Liberace Foundation is still operating in Las Vegas and manages the collection. In November 2013, the Liberace Foundation exhibited a portion of Liberace's collection at the Cosmopolitan of Las Vegas, in an exhibition titled "Too Much of a Good Thing is Wonderful: Liberace and the Art of Costume." It featured 15 performance costumes, the rhinestone Baldwin piano, and a rhinestone-encrusted Excalibur kitcar. The exhibition closed in October 2014.

The sign for the Liberace Museum was restored and relit in 2014, featured at the Neon Museum boneyard.

=== Thriller Villa ===
The Liberace Foundation announced in 2015 that the Museum Collection is being housed inside one of Michael Jackson's former residences in Las Vegas, and features a 5,000-square-foot (460 m^{2}) exhibition space. According to the Liberace Foundation's website, private showings can be arranged by appointment. The building, now known as Thriller Villa, was originally built in 1952 and expanded in the 1990s as Hacienda Palomino by local theater developer Horst Schmidt; after Schmidt died, it was sold to Aner Iglesias, the honorary consul of El Salvador, in 2004. Jackson rented the house from 2007 until his death in 2009.

=== Liberace Garage ===
As of April 7, 2016, a new commercial location has opened called, "The Liberace Garage" featuring all 8 vehicles from the Liberace Museum, housed in the Hollywood Cars Museum. The space also features the rhinestone-encrusted Radio City Baldwin piano, and stage costumes worn by Liberace.

For the 2019 Grammy Awards, Chloe Flower performed on the rhinestone Baldwin, flown to Los Angeles for the award ceremony, while backing Cardi B.

Liberace vehicle collection
| Year | Make | Model | Image | Notes |
|---|---|---|---|---|
| 1901 | Oldsmobile | Curved Dash | | Replica, 3/4-scale |
| 1931 | Ford | Model A | | Replica, used on stage at his Las Vegas Hilton residency in the 1970s. Painted red. |
| 1954 | Rolls-Royce | Silver Dawn convertible | | Custom painted in red, white, and blue; known as "Bicentennial" or "Stars and Stripes" |
| 1957 | Austin | FX3 | | Liberace would pick up friends from the Palm Springs Airport in this customized London Taxi. |
| 1962 | Rolls-Royce | Phantom V | | Landau top; mirrored tiles applied by John Hancock, includes a full bar and mobile phone. |
| 196x | Excalibur | Roadster | | Rhinestone-encrusted kitcar, aka the "Rhinestone Roadster"; sometimes misattributed as a Duesenberg replica or as a "Mercedes Excalibur" and dated to 1934. |
| 1971 | Volkswagen | Beetle | | "VolksRolls" customized to look like a Rolls-Royce by George Barris; California vanity plate registration "VWRR JR". |
| 1972 | Bradley | GT | | Finished in gold metalflake with silver candelabra emblems on the sides |
