= Stefano Massini =

Italian playwright and theatre director (born 1975)

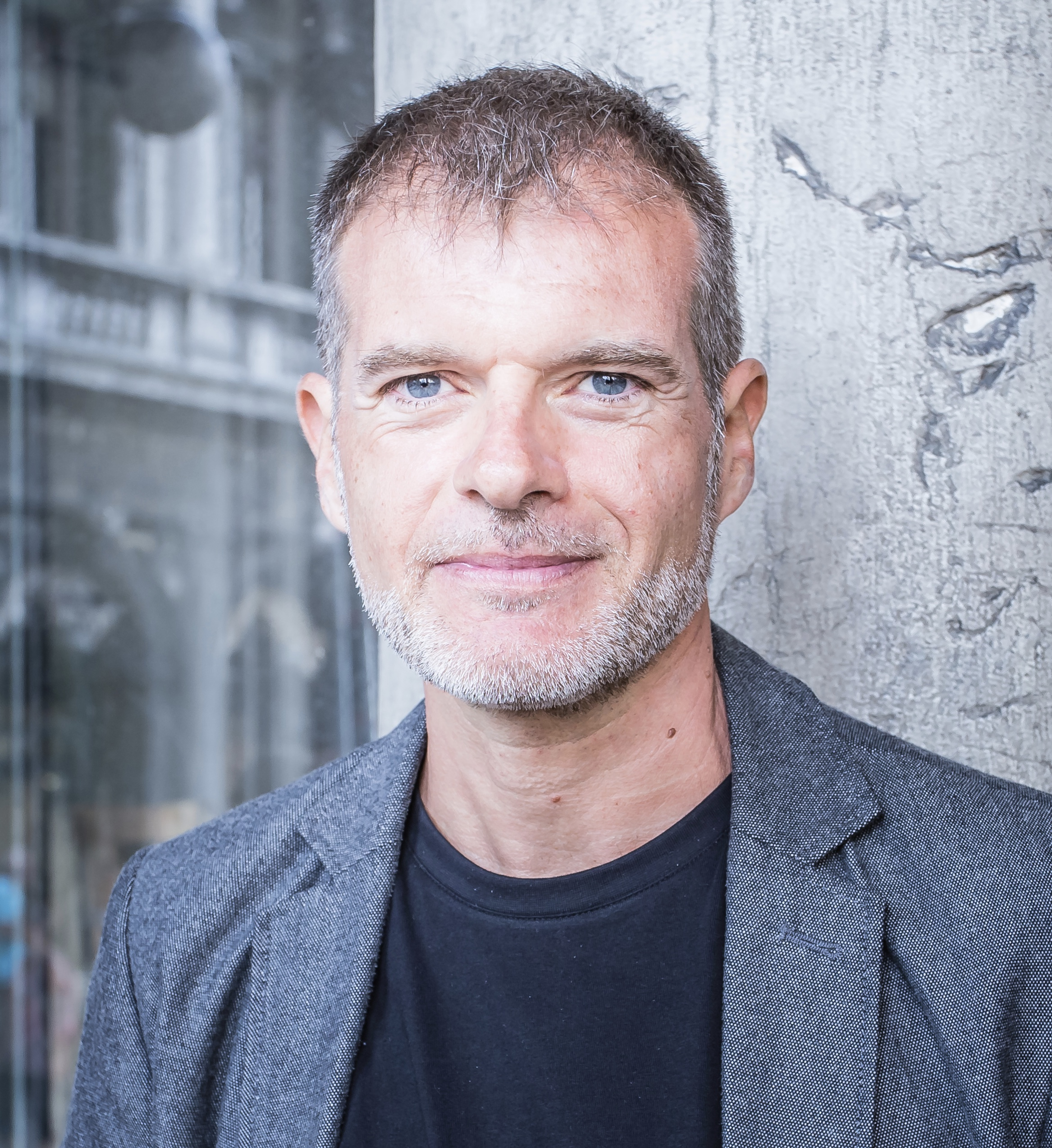
- Stefano Massini in 2017
- Born: 22 September 1975; Florence, Italy
- Education: University of Florence
- Occupations: writer; essayist; playwright
- Years active: 1999–present
- Awards: Tony Award for Best Play

Stefano Massini (born 22 September 1975) is an Italian writer, essayist and playwright.

== Biography ==
Massini was born in Florence in 1975, and graduated in Ancient Literature from the University of Florence.

While working for the Maggio Musicale Fiorentino, Massini met theatre director Luca Ronconi, who later took him as an assistant at the Piccolo Teatro di Milano. Ronconi's words of encouragement were pivotal in prompting Massini to start writing his first plays.

His play 7 minuti was the basis for the 2016 film 7 Minutes, directed by Michele Placido.

He is the author of The Lehman Trilogy, which has played in both London and Broadway to great critical acclaim, was nominated for five Laurence Olivier Awards and won five Tony Awards, including the Tony Award for Best Play. The play was also the basis for his novel Qualcosa sui Lehman, winner of the 2018 Prix Médicis.

His work has been staged in France, Germany, Austria, Belgium, Czech Republic, Switzerland, Spain, Greece, Canada, Argentina, Algeria, Peru, Mexico, South Korea, Russia and Hungary.

== Works ==
- 7 minuti - Consiglio di fabbrica (2013)
- Qualcosa sui Lehman (2016) - The Lehman Trilogy, trans. Richard Dixon (2019)
- Dizionario inesistente (2018) - The Book of Nonexistent Words, trans. Richard Dixon (2021)
- Manhattan Project (2023)
- The Ladies Football Club (Crucible Theatre, Sheffield, 2026)
- Donald (Ustinov Studio, Bath, 2026)
