= The Deep Blue Sea (2011 film) =

- UK theatrical release poster
- Directed by: Terence Davies
- Screenplay by: Terence Davies
- Based on: The Deep Blue Sea by Terence Rattigan
- Produced by: Sean O'Connor; Kate Ogborn
- Starring: Rachel Weisz; Tom Hiddleston; Simon Russell Beale; Harry Hadden-Paton
- Cinematography: Florian Hoffmeister
- Edited by: David Charap
- Music by: Samuel Barber
- Production companies: Film4; UK Film Council; Artificial Eye
- Distributed by: Artificial Eye
- Release dates: 11 September 2011 (TIFF); 25 November 2011
- Running time: 98 minutes
- Country: United Kingdom
- Language: English
- Budget: $8 million
- Box office: $3.1 million

The Deep Blue Sea is a 2011 British romantic drama film written and directed by Terence Davies and starring Rachel Weisz, Tom Hiddleston, and Simon Russell Beale. It is an adaptation of the 1952 Terence Rattigan play The Deep Blue Sea about the wife of a judge who engages in an affair with a former RAF pilot. This film version was funded by the UK Film Council and Film4, produced by Sean O'Connor and Kate Ogborn.

Filming began in late 2010 and it was released in the United Kingdom in 2011, the year of Rattigan's centenary. It was released in the United States in 2012 by distributor Music Box Films.

== Plot ==
In 1950, Hester Collyer, the younger wife of High Court judge Sir William Collyer, has embarked on a passionate affair with Freddie Page, a handsome young former RAF pilot troubled by his memories of the Second World War. Freddie throws Hester's life in turmoil, as their erotic relationship leaves her emotionally stranded and physically isolated. For Freddie, the tumultuous wartime mix of fear and excitement that was once in his life seems to be no longer present.

Most of the film takes place during one day in Hester's flat, a day on which she has decided to kill herself. Her suicide attempt fails and as she recovers, the story of her affair and her married life is played out in a mosaic of short and sporadic flashbacks. Hester's comfortable marriage is then depicted as affectionate but without sexual passion.

As Hester's affair is discovered she leaves her life of comparative luxury and moves into a dingy London flat with Freddie. Hester's new lover has awakened her sexuality, but the reckless, thrill-seeking Freddie can never give her the love and stability that her husband gave her. Yet to return to a life without passion would be unbearable for her. The film takes its title from her dilemma of being caught between the devil and the deep blue sea – two equally undesirable situations.

== Cast ==
- Rachel Weisz as Hester Collyer
- Tom Hiddleston as Freddie Page
- Simon Russell Beale as Sir William Collyer
- Harry Hadden-Paton as Jackie Jackson
- Ann Mitchell as Mrs Elton
- Sarah Kants as Liz Jackson
- Karl Johnson as Mr. Miller
- Barbara Jefford as Collyer's mother
- Oliver Ford Davies as Hester's father

== Production ==
The film was commissioned by the Rattigan Trust, and was released in time for Rattigan's centenary in 2011.

Filming locations are in Buckinghamshire and London including the 3 Mills Studios in Bow.

The background music is taken from Samuel Barber's violin concerto written 1939.

== Critical reception ==
The film was released to strongly positive reviews from critics. On the review aggregator website Rotten Tomatoes, the film holds a rating of 80%, based on 143 reviews, with an average rating of 7.1/10. The website's consensus reads, "Featuring an outstanding performance by Rachel Weisz, The Deep Blue Sea is a visually stunning, melancholy tale of subsumed passion." It also has a score of 82 out of 100 on Metacritic, based on 30 reviews.

For her performance, Weisz won the Best Actress Award at the 2012 New York Film Critics Circle Awards and also won the Best Actress Award from the Toronto Film Critics Association in the same year.

In January 2012, Weisz was nominated as Best Actress in the 70th Golden Globe Awards. The film was also chosen as one of the Top Ten films of the year by The New York Times and The Los Angeles Times. The film has found a largely appreciative audience and critical success in the United States, with Weisz's performance named as the "film performance of 2012" by David Edelstein of New York magazine.

== Accolades ==
Award	Date of ceremony	Category	Recipients and nominees	Outcome
55th BFI London Film Festival	12–27 October 2011	Best Film	The Deep Blue Sea	Nominated
39th Evening Standard British Film Awards	6 February 2012	Best Actress	Rachel Weisz	Nominated
33rd London Film Critics' Circle	19 January 2012	British Actress of the Year	Rachel Weisz	Nominated
33rd London Film Critics' Circle	19 January 2012	Supporting Actor of the Year	Simon Russell Beale	Nominated
2012 New York Film Critics Circle Awards	3 December 2012	Best Actress	Rachel Weisz	Won
70th Golden Globe Awards	13 January 2013	Best Actress in a Motion Picture – Drama	Rachel Weisz	Nominated
