= Collaborators (play) =

2011 play by John Hodge

Collaborators is a 2011 play by British screenwriter and dramatist John Hodge about the "surreal fantasy" of a relationship between two historical figures, Mikhail Bulgakov, the prominent Russian writer, and Joseph Stalin, the dictator of the Soviet Union. The play takes place from 1938 to 1940, when Stalin was implementing the Great Purge in which several million people were exiled, imprisoned, or executed. The play is Hodge's first, although he has had a long career as a screenwriter.

The play received its première at the National Theatre, London, on 25 October 2011; Nicholas Hytner directed, with Alex Jennings as Bulgakov and Simon Russell Beale as Stalin. The production subsequently won the 2012 Laurence Olivier Award for the best new play produced in Britain. The play has been published in the United Kingdom and in the U.S.

== Plot summary ==
The story takes place in Moscow in the years 1938 to 1940 and the drama centers around the apartment of Mikhail Bulgakov and his wife Yelena.

Bulgakov has just finished his play The Life of Monsieur de Molière which his friends acclaim a masterpiece. The night after the premiere, he is visited by two secret policemen from the NKVD. They tell him the play is banned and will never be shown again unless he cooperates with them in writing a "hack" play on the life of the young Joseph Stalin. At first Bulgakov resists their bullying and refuses to cooperate even though this could endanger his life. Their terrorizing of Bulgakov intensifies until he pretends to start but sits at the typewriter unable to put words to paper. Then one night he receives a phone call, and a mystery voice offers him help if he goes to a certain metro station and enters a door hidden in the tunnel. Bulgakov follows the instructions and finds himself alone in a room beneath the Kremlin with Joseph Stalin himself. Stalin says he has always admired Bulgakov's work and offers his assistance in the play. Stalin sits at the typewriter and produces scenes which delight the NKVD with their depiction of Stalin as a heroic and glorious leader fighting Czarist oppression. While Stalin types Bulgakov relieves Stalin of the burden of some of his state papers. Inadvertently Bulgakov becomes involved in issuing the orders which bring about the Great Purge of Stalinist Russia. The play is finished but the monster of the purges consumes his friends' lives one by one. The strain on Bulgakov leads to an intensification of his inherited disease, nephrosclerosis, and his eventual death at the rather young age of 48.

== Historical context ==
The play is a fictional device to examine the conflict experienced by a writer who is trying to portray a recognizable depiction of the human condition in a tyrannical world which systematically represses such expression.

Bulgakov did receive a phone call from Stalin out of the blue at an earlier stage in his career in 1930 in which he was favoured with a new post. He knew that the dictator admired his work and followed his output.

No formal collaboration between Stalin and Bulgakov existed but the figure of Stalin as a monster inside Bulgakov's mind existed, and this was reinforced physically through the NKVD.

Bulgakov did indeed write a play to order on the life of the young Stalin around the time depicted, entitled Batum, which is regarded by modern critics as stilted and shallow. The terror of the tyrant led him to produce a play on demand which might have been written by the dictator himself.

Bulgakov's play Molière: The Cabal of Hypocrites (1936), of which there are brief extracts within this play, examines the life of another author, Molière, at the court of a tyrant, Louis XIV.

== Critical reception ==
The original production received somewhat mixed reviews. Charles Spencer wrote for The Daily Telegraph, "This is a truly tremendous double act which thrills chills and makes you laugh out loud - even though you know you shouldn’t." Michael Billington wrote for The Guardian, "the purpose of Hodge's satirical fantasia is clearly to suggest Bulgakov's obsession with Stalin is proof of the latter's ultimate triumph. ... While I may question Hodge's arguments, his play has a nightmarish vivacity well captured in Nicholas Hytner's freewheeling production on Bob Crowley's zig-zagging traverse stage."

== Live broadcast and US productions ==
On 1 December 2011, the original production was broadcast to cinemas around the world as a part of the National Theatre Live programme.

In 2016, the play received new productions in New York City and in Washington, D.C.
