= Jumpers (play) =

Play by Tom Stoppard

Michael Hordern as the philosopher George Moore, from the playtext cover. Moore is about to loose the arrow and to disprove Zeno's arrow paradox.

Jumpers is a play by Tom Stoppard which was first performed in 1972. It explores and satirises the field of academic philosophy by likening it to a less-than-skilful competitive gymnastics display. Jumpers raises questions such as "What do we know?" and "Where do values come from?" It is set in an alternative reality in which some British astronauts have landed on the Moon and "Radical Liberals" (read pragmatists and relativists) have taken over the British government (the play seems to suggest that pragmatists and relativists would be immoral since Archie says that murder is not wrong, merely "antisocial"). It was inspired by the notion that a crewed Moon landing would ruin the Moon as a poetic trope and possibly lead to a collapse of moral values. It has been said that Jumpers is "a play often dismissed as too clever by half", but a number of other writers have listed it among Stoppard's highest achievements.

== Plot ==
A significant element of the play is George's unavailing efforts to define 'Good' and other philosophical abstractions in which he demonstrates his foolishness and lack of connection with the real world.

The bathetic climax comes when George, firing an arrow to demonstrate Zeno's paradox, accidentally shoots dead a pet hare that he uses to model the fable of The Hare and the Tortoise. Blinded by grief, he steps on and crushes the tortoise, which forms the other part of the demonstration.

The British Moon landing parodies the 1910–1913 Terra Nova expedition to the South Pole led by Robert Falcon Scott since the astronauts, rather than dying together, turn on one another in adversity.

== Productions ==
The play was first performed by the National Theatre Company at the Old Vic Theatre, London, on 2 February 1972 with Michael Hordern and Diana Rigg in the leading roles of George and Dorothy. Peter Wood directed the original production, and Carl Toms designed its sets and costumes.

The Melbourne Theatre Company (MTC), in Australia, staged the play in 1972.

The play premiered on Broadway on 22 April 1974 at the Billy Rose Theatre and closed on 1 June 1974 after 48 performances. Directed again by Peter Wood, with choreography and staging by Dennis Nahat and original music by Claus Ogerman, it featured Brian Bedford and Jill Clayburgh. Bedford won the Drama Desk Award, Outstanding Performance.

In 1984, Nicholas Hytner directed a production at the Royal Exchange, Manchester, with Tom Courtenay as George, Julie Walters as Dotty and John Bennett as Archie.

A revival directed for the Royal National Theatre by David Leveaux opened in London's Lyttelton Theatre on June 19, 2003. The show transferred to Broadway on 25 April 2004, playing at the Brooks Atkinson Theatre, and closed on 11 July 2004 after 89 performances and 23 previews. The Broadway show featured Simon Russell Beale as George and Essie Davis as Dotty. The play received a Tony Award nomination for Best play revival.

== Reception ==
The London premiere of Jumpers garnered praise, and the play began a second run (at the National Theatre) by 1976, but Jumpers, according to Paul Delaney, "came over to the United States in an indifferently received production; and in 1975, it was subjected to a disastrous Chicago area premiere at the Evanston (later to become Northlight) Theatre." Detractors first "faulted the play as a 'shallow display of stage pyrotechnics' and admirers praised it for 'a dazzling display of virtuosity'". Kenneth Tynan in 1977 described Jumpers as Stoppard's masterpiece up to that point, and Delaney agreed by arguing that the character of Moore was neither Stoppard's masterpiece nor the comic butt of the farce and that the play instead "leads us to a complex vision which precludes a simple yes or no answer to the question of whether Stoppard comes down on George's side". Benedict Nightingale lauded the play as achieving a combination of social criticism and metaphysics "with a theatrical extravagance that verges on the outrageous, [and] with a nice sense of individual character".

Michael Hinden in 1981 dubbed Jumpers "Stoppard's most ambitious work", noted the many references to other literary figures and philosophers and referred to it as a very literate play "which ties itself by many threads to an unraveling tradition of literature and thought. [...] few contemporary plays are as passionate or as intelligently written". Richard Christiansen praised the "sparkling wit and dark despair" of the text. Despite describing the Court Theatre performance he attended as somewhat uninvolving, Christiansen argued that "Stoppard keeps [the play's] disparate forces laced together with bouncy wordplay and knockabout comedy". Nigel Purse in Tom Stoppard's Plays lauded the play for thematic devices and the humour that reflect or enhance the themes: "the seeming chaos actually has an explanation within the framework of the debate on morality". Bill Alexander's 1999 production was derided by critics, but the play itself was still praised in The Independent as having "spry mental gymnastics".

Theresa Montana Sabo said that "the action of the play dramatizes in many rich and funny ways the philosophical issues which George develops in his monologues and arguments". The Independent's Robert Hanks, discussing the play in 2003, said that some plot points anticipated a cabinet reshuffle by Tony Blair (which was described as revealing a thirst for radical constitutional reform), and praised "the pathos of George's situation". The critic found the philosophy dated: "The kind of penny-plain, positivist approach to morality Stoppard resents has long been out of style". Still, Hanks dubbed Jumpers "a marvellous display of Stoppard's verbal ingenuity, with some beautifully contrived cross-purposes and neat gags". In 2003, The Guardian's Michael Billington said that the politics are dated and that "his play is best in tracing the collapse of a dysfunctional marriage and the incremental humiliation of its hero".

In 2004, Elysa Gardner of USA Today described the work as "a freewheeling farce with a soulful, searing conscience". She argued that Moore "delivers discourses that are at once searching, provocative and devastatingly funny. [...] Stoppard rejects the notion that religious and spiritual conviction automatically translate into anti-intellectualism". Ben Brantley of The New York Times billed Jumpers as "a poignant acknowledgment of the limits of cleverness [...] Like George, 'Jumpers' can seem all too swept up in its own cerebral whimsy. But it is also like George in the seriousness that underlies its diverting surface". Brantley said that it is "less a showoff demonstration of what Mr. Stoppard knows than a humble contemplation of what he and all humankind can never know". Gabrielle Kloppers of Bwog praised "its convincing character portrayals and boundless sexual innuendo".

Variety's Charles Isherwood praised a 2004 production but had more mixed views on the play itself. He lauded George's sustained ignorance of the violent act central to the plot as a "supremely funny running gag". However, Isherwood wrote, "Stoppard's writing is often needlessly verbose here, and the ideas in Jumpers are not as elegantly integrated into the proceedings as they are in later plays like Arcadia and The Invention of Love".

Some reviewers have criticised the play. Jonathan Bennett argued, "Rosencrantz does not parade its philosophical content; but the philosophy is there all the same, and it is solid, serious and functional. In contrast with this, the philosophy which is flaunted throughout Jumpers is thin and uninteresting, and it serves the play only in a decorative and marginal way". David Finkle complained that Stoppard "abruptly closes his bag of tricks". He argued the work may have a message but gave the impression that "Stoppard had himself a tempting set-up and took it as far as he could [...] He has enough steam to get through the first act but he doesn't know what to do in the second act". Finkle called the dream sequence "overwrought and underwritten; it also shifts focus away from George".

Criticizing Stoppard's right-leaning politics, Malcolm Johnson called Jumpers a "complex, even convoluted text" and wrote, "Because of Stoppard's overwrought cleverness, 'Jumpers' can be trying at times. And sometimes it fails to fit together persuasively". Lizzie Loveridge wrote, "Whilst Jumpers is a comedy with the usual string of brilliant Stoppardian witticisms and clever observations, it is quite difficult to follow as an integrated whole. [...] Reading the play as text is difficult in places because of the interjection of the numerous and bizarre stage directions which are hard to visualise when you haven't seen them and harder to interpret when you have." Brian Clover argued that another critic's view of Stoppard's writing as "indefatigably facetious" could be applied to Jumpers. Clover said that in the first act the playwright sometimes "seems to be emptying out all the aphorisms in his notebook rather than writing. The second act works at a better pace and gels as a piece of theatre though not as drama, since the issues raised in the first half, both human and abstract, remain unresolved".

== Awards and nominations ==
=== 2004 Broadway revival ===
Year	Award	Category	Nominee	Result
2004	Tony Award	Best Revival of a Play		Nominated
2004	Tony Award	Best Performance by a Leading Actor in a Play	Simon Russell Beale	Nominated
2004	Tony Award	Best Featured Actress in a Play	Essie Davis	Nominated
2004	Tony Award	Best Direction of a Play	David Leveaux	Nominated
