= Simon Russell Beale =

English actor (born 1961)

Sir Simon Russell Beale CBE
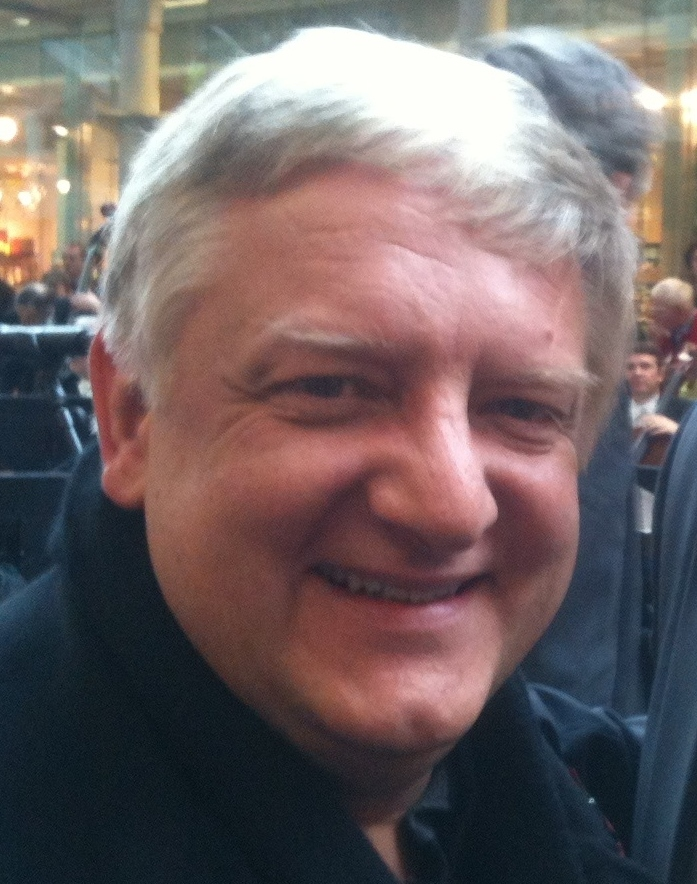
- Beale in 2011
- Born: 12 January 1961 (age 65); Penang, Federation of Malaya
- Education: Gonville and Caius College, Cambridge (BA); Guildhall School of Music and Drama (GrDip)
- Occupations: Actor; author; historian
- Years active: 1985–present
- Awards: Full list
- Simon Russell Beale's voice Recorded July 2007 from the BBC Radio 4 programme Desert Island Discs

Sir Simon Russell Beale (born 12 January 1961) is an English actor. Once described by The Independent as "the greatest stage actor of his generation", he has received various accolades, including a Tony Award, three Laurence Olivier Awards, and two British Academy Television Awards. For his services to drama, he was knighted by Queen Elizabeth II in 2019.

Beale started his acting career at the Royal Shakespeare Company and National Theatre. He has received ten Olivier Award nominations, winning three awards for his performances in Volpone (1996), Candide (2000), and Uncle Vanya (2003). For his work on the Broadway stage he has received a Tony Award for Best Actor in a Play nomination for his performance as George in the Tom Stoppard play Jumpers in 2004. For his role as Henry Lehman in The Lehman Trilogy, he won the Tony Award for Best Actor in a Play and was nominated for an Olivier Award for Best Actor.

Beale made his film debut in Sally Potter's period drama Orlando (1992). He gained prominence for his roles in Persuasion (1995), Hamlet (1996), My Week with Marilyn (2011), The Deep Blue Sea (2011), Mary Queen of Scots (2018), Benediction (2021), and The Outfit (2022). In 2017, he portrayed Lavrentiy Beria in Armando Iannucci's The Death of Stalin, for which he received the British Independent Film Award for Best Supporting Actor.

Beale has also appeared in the television projects The Young Visiters (2003), Dunkirk (2004), and Vanity Fair (2018). He earned two British Academy Television Awards: one for Best Actor for A Dance to the Music of Time (1998), and the other for Best Supporting Actor for Henry IV, Part I and Part II (2012). From 2014 to 2016, he was part of the main cast of Showtime's Penny Dreadful, and from 2024 to 2026, House of the Dragon.

== Early life and education ==
Beale was born on 12 January 1961 in Penang, Malaya, one of six children of Captain, later Lieutenant General, Sir Peter Beale and his wife Julia née Winter. At the time of his birth, Beale's father was serving in the Army Medical Services. From 1991 to 1994, Beale's father served as Surgeon-General of HM Armed Forces. Several other members of Beale's family have successfully pursued careers in medicine.

Beale was first drawn to the performance arts when, at the age of eight, he became a chorister at St Paul's Cathedral and a pupil at the adjoining St Paul's Cathedral School. His secondary education was undertaken at the independent Clifton College in Bristol.

His first stage performance was as Hippolyta in A Midsummer Night's Dream at primary school. In the sixth form at Clifton, he also performed in Rosencrantz and Guildenstern Are Dead, a play in which he would later star at the National Theatre.

After Clifton, he attended Gonville and Caius College, Cambridge, and obtained a first in English, after which he was offered a place to undertake a PhD. He pursued further studies at Guildhall School of Music and Drama, finishing in 1983.

== Career ==
=== 1988–1999: Early work with the Royal Shakespeare Company ===
Beale first came to the attention of theatre-goers in the late 1980s with a series of lauded comic performances, which were on occasion extremely camp, in such plays as The Man of Mode by George Etherege and Restoration by Edward Bond at the Royal Shakespeare Company (RSC). He broadened his range in the early 1990s with moving performances as Konstantin in Chekhov's The Seagull, as Oswald in Ibsen's Ghosts, Ferdinand in The Duchess of Malfi and as Edgar in King Lear. At the first annual Ian Charleson Awards in January 1991, he received a special commendation for his 1990 performances of Konstantin in The Seagull, Thersites in Troilus and Cressida and Edward II in Edward II, all at the RSC.

It was at the RSC that he first worked with Sam Mendes, who directed him as Thersites in Troilus and Cressida, as Richard III and as Ariel in The Tempest, in the last of which he revealed a fine tenor voice. Mendes also directed him as Iago in Othello at the Royal National Theatre and in Mendes's farewell productions at the Donmar Warehouse in 2002, Chekhov's Uncle Vanya, in which Beale played the title role, and Twelfth Night, in which he played Malvolio. He won the 2003 Laurence Olivier Award for Uncle Vanya.

Since 1995, he has been a regular at the National Theatre, where his roles have included Mosca in Ben Jonson's Volpone opposite Michael Gambon, George in Tom Stoppard's Jumpers and the lead in Humble Boy by Charlotte Jones, a part written specially for him. In 1997, he played the pivotal role of Kenneth Widmerpool in a television adaptation of Anthony Powell's A Dance to the Music of Time, for which he won the Best Actor award at the British Academy Television Awards in 1998. The following year, he was a key part of Trevor Nunn's ensemble, playing in Leonard Bernstein's Candide (Voltaire/Pangloss), his "delivery of the lines [...] true to Voltaire in that it is simultaneously hilarious and horrible", Edward Bulwer-Lytton's Money and Maxim Gorky's Summerfolk at the National. In autumn 2006, he played Galileo in David Hare's adaption of Bertold Brecht's Life of Galileo and as Face in The Alchemist.

=== 2000–2009: Theatrical acclaim and Broadway debut ===
In 2000, he played Hamlet in a production directed by John Caird for the National Theatre, a role for which he was described by The Daily Telegraph as "portly [and] relatively long in the tooth". In 2005, Beale was directed by Deborah Warner as Cassius in Julius Caesar alongside Ralph Fiennes as Antony. That same year, he played the title role in Macbeth at the Almeida Theatre. In 2007, he reprised his 2005 Broadway role as King Arthur in the Monty Python musical Spamalot at the Palace Theatre, London.

From December 2007 to March 2008, he played Benedick in Much Ado About Nothing directed by Nicholas Hytner at the National Theatre and from February to July 2008, he played Andrew Undershaft in Hytner's production of Shaw's Major Barbara; he then appeared in Harold Pinter's A Slight Ache and Landscape.

In 2008, he made his debut as a television presenter, fronting the BBC series Sacred Music with Harry Christophers and The Sixteen. Various specials and a second series have since been produced; the most recent episode (Monteverdi in Mantua: The Genius of the Vespers) was broadcast in 2015. In spring 2009, Beale and Sam Mendes collaborated on The Winter's Tale and The Cherry Orchard, in which Beale played Leontes and Lopakhin respectively, at the Brooklyn Academy of Music, later transferring to the Old Vic Theatre.

From 2009 to 2010, he played George Smiley in the BBC Radio 4 adaptation of all the John le Carré novels in which Smiley featured. These were broadcast in nineteen 90-minute or 60-minute full cast radio plays. From March to June 2010, he played Sir Harcourt Courtly in London Assurance, again at the National. In August 2010, he appeared in the first West End revival of Deathtrap by Ira Levin. In March 2011, he made his debut with The Royal Ballet in Alice's Adventures in Wonderland as the Duchess. In October 2011, he returned to the National to star as Joseph Stalin in the premiere of Collaborators, for which he won Best Actor at the 2012 Evening Standard Awards.

=== 2010–2019: Established actor and work on screen ===
In 2010–11, Beale played the Coalition Home Secretary William Towers in the two final series of BBC One's spy drama, Spooks. He played the title role in Timon of Athens at the National Theatre from July to October 2012. The production was broadcast to cinemas around the world (as was Collaborators earlier) on 1 November 2012 through the National Theatre Live programme. He starred in a revival of Peter Nichols' Privates on Parade as part of Michael Grandage's new West End season at the Noël Coward Theatre from December 2012 to March 2013.

In 2013, he won the British Academy Television Award (BAFTA) for Best Supporting Actor for his performance as Falstaff in the BBC's The Hollow Crown series of TV films about Shakespeare's historical dramas Richard II; Henry IV, Part 1; Henry IV, Part 2; and Henry V. That same year he appeared in National Theatre Live: 50 Years On Stage (2013).

Beale appeared alongside John Simm in Harold Pinter's The Hothouse at the Trafalgar Studios from May to August 2013, directed by Jamie Lloyd. From January 2014, he played the title role in King Lear at the National Theatre, directed once again by Sam Mendes. Also from 2014 to 2016 he starred as a main cast member in Showtime's Penny Dreadful, in which he played an eccentric Egyptologist. In 2014, Beale was appointed the Cameron Mackintosh Professor of Contemporary Theatre at Oxford University, based at St Catherine's College.

From May to July 2015, he starred in Temple, a new play at the Donmar Warehouse about the 2011 United Kingdom anti-austerity protests. In September and October 2015, he played Samuel Foote in Mr Foote's Other Leg at the Hampstead Theatre. It transferred to the Theatre Royal Haymarket from October 2015 to January 2016.

In November 2016, Beale returned to the Royal Shakespeare Company in Stratford-upon-Avon, to play Prospero in The Tempest. In June 2017, it transferred to the Barbican Centre in London. In July 2018, Beale returned to the National, starring opposite Ben Miles and Adam Godley in The Lehman Trilogy, again directed by Mendes. It transferred to the Piccadilly Theatre in the West End in May 2019. Beale starred in the title role of Richard II at the Almeida Theatre from December 2018 to February 2019.

=== 2020–present: The Lehman Trilogy and other roles ===
During the COVID-19 pandemic, Beale contributed as a guest speaker to The Show Must Go Online's performance of Timon of Athens.

In the summer of 2021, Beale played JS Bach in the world première of Nina Raine's Bach and Sons, directed by frequent collaborator Nicholas Hytner at his company's Bridge Theatre in London.

During this time he re-rehearsed for the post-COVID return in late September of the Broadway transfer of the National Theatre production of The Lehman Trilogy whose run had been halted on 12 March 2020 by the pandemic. Beale reprised his role (along with Adam Godley) but, due to stage commitments in London for the RSC in the third part of the Wolf Hall trilogy, Ben Miles was replaced by Adrian Lester. Beale won a Tony Award for Best Actor in a Play for his performance in The Lehman Trilogy.

In April 2023, it was announced that Beale had been cast as Ser Simon Strong in the second season of House of the Dragon.

In April 2025, Beale returned to the Royal Shakespeare Company to play the title role in Titus Andronicus in the Swan Theatre, Stratford-upon-Avon, directed by Max Webster. In September 2026, he played the role of Liberace in the play I'll Be Seeing You.

== Personal life ==
Beale is a past president of the Anthony Powell Society, a tribute to his portrayal of Kenneth Widmerpool.

Beale is gay. In the Independent on Sunday 2006 Pink List – a list of the most influential gay men and women in the UK – he was placed at number 30.

He was knighted by Queen Elizabeth II, at Buckingham Palace, on 9 October 2019.

== Acting credits ==
Key
†	Denotes films that have not yet been released

=== Film ===
Year	Title	Role	Notes
1992	Orlando	Earl of Moray	
1995	Persuasion	Charles Musgrove	
1996	Hamlet	Second gravedigger	
1999	Blackadder: Back & Forth	Napoleon	Short film
2002	The Gathering	Luke Fraser	
2011	The Deep Blue Sea	William Collyer	
2011	My Week with Marilyn	Mr. Cotes-Preedy	
2014	Into the Woods	Baker's Father	
2016	Cunk on Shakespeare	Himself	
2016	The Legend of Tarzan	Mr. Frum	
2017	My Cousin Rachel	Couch	
2017	The Death of Stalin	Lavrentiy Beria	British Independent Film Award for Best Supporting Actor
2018	Museum	Frank Graves	
2018	Operation Finale	David Ben-Gurion	
2018	Mary Queen of Scots	Robert Beale	
2019	Radioactive	Gabriel Lippmann	
2020	A Christmas Carol	Ebenezer Scrooge	Voice
2021	Benediction	Robbie Ross	
2021	Operation Mincemeat	Winston Churchill	
2022	The Outfit	Roy Boyle	
2022	Thor: Love and Thunder	Dionysus	
2023	Firebrand	Stephen Gardiner	
2025	The Choral	Edward Elgar	
2025	Downton Abbey: The Grand Finale	Sir Hector Moreland	
2026	The Magic Faraway Tree	Know-All	
2026	De Gaulle	Winston Churchill	
2026	Prima Facie	Sir Hugh Dalton KC	

=== Television ===
Year	Title	Role	Notes
1988	A Very Peculiar Practice	Mark Stibbs	Episode: "Art and Illusion"
1992	Downtown Lagos	Heron	3 episodes
1993	The Mushroom Picker	Anthony	3 episodes
1997	A Dance to the Music of Time	Kenneth Widmerpool	4 episodes
1997	The Temptation of Franz Schubert	Franz Schubert	Television film
1999	Alice in Wonderland	King of Hearts	Television film
1999	Blackadder: Back & Forth	Napoleon	BBC Christmas special
2003	The Young Visiters	Prince of Wales	Television film
2004	Dunkirk	Winston Churchill	BBC Movie
2006	American Experience	John Adams	Episode: "America's First Power Couple"
2010–11	Spooks	Home Secretary	13 episodes
2012	The Hollow Crown	Falstaff	Episode: "Henry IV, Parts I & II"
2014–16	Penny Dreadful	Ferdinand Lyle	14 episodes
2018	Vanity Fair	John Sedley	6 episodes
2024	Mary & George	Sir George Villiers	Miniseries
2024	Douglas Is Cancelled	Bently	Miniseries
2024–26	House of the Dragon	Ser Simon Strong	Main role; 7 episodes

=== Theatre ===
Selected credits:

Year	Title	Role	Venue
1991	The Seagull	Konstantin	Royal Shakespeare Company; Royal Shakespeare Theatre, Stratford-upon-Avon
1994	The Tempest	Ariel	Stratford, England
1995	The Duchess of Malfi	Performer	Greenwich and West End
1995	Volpone	Mosca	National Theatre, London
1996	Rosencrantz and Guildenstern Are Dead	Performer	National Theatre, London
1997–1998	Othello	Iago	National Theatre, London
1999	Money	Alfred Evelyn	National Theatre, London
1999–2000	Battle Royal	Performer	National Theatre, London
2001	Hamlet	Hamlet	Brooklyn Academy of Music, New York City
2001	Humble Boy	Performer	National Theatre, London
2002	Uncle Vanya	Uncle Vanya	Donmar Warehouse, London; Brooklyn Academy of Music
2002	Twelfth Night	Malvolio	Donmar Warehouse
2004	Jumpers	George	Brooks Atkinson Theatre, Broadway debut
2004	Macbeth	Macbeth	Almeida Theatre
2005	The Philanthropist	Philip	Donmar Warehouse
2005–2007	Spamalot	King Arthur (replacement)	Shubert Theatre, Broadway; Palace Theatre, London
2008	Major Barbara	Andrew Undershaft	Royal National Theatre
2009	The Cherry Orchard; The Winter's Tale	Lopakhin; Leontes	Brooklyn Academy of Music
2010	London Assurance	Sir Harcourt Courtly	National Theatre, London
2011	Bluebeard	Jimmy MacNeill	Atlantic Theater Company
2011	Collaborators	Joseph Stalin	Royal National Theatre, London
2012	Timon of Athens	Timon of Athens	National Theatre, London
2012–2013	Privates on Parade	Captain Terri Dennis	Noël Coward Theatre
2014	King Lear	King Lear	National Theatre, London
2015	Temple	Dean	Donmar Warehouse
2015	Mr. Foote's Other Leg	Samuel Foote	Hampstead Theatre
2016–2017	The Tempest	Prospero	Royal Shakespeare Company, Royal Shakespeare Theatre, Stratford-upon-Avon Barbican Centre, London
2018	The Lehman Trilogy	Henry Lehman & Philip Lehman	National Theatre, London
2019	The Tragedy of King Richard the Second	King Richard II	Almeida Theatre
2019–2020	The Lehman Trilogy	Henry Lehman & Philip Lehman	Park Avenue Armory, Off-Broadway; Piccadilly Theatre, London
2020–2021	A Christmas Carol	Ebenezer Scrooge	Bridge Theatre
2021	Bach & Sons	Johann Sebastian Bach	Bridge Theatre
2021–2022	The Lehman Trilogy	Henry Lehman & Philip Lehman	Nederlander Theatre, Broadway; Ahmanson Theatre
2022	John Gabriel Borkman	John Gabriel Borkman	Bridge Theatre
2024–2025	The Invention of Love	A. E. Housman	Hampstead Theatre
2025	Titus Andronicus	Titus Andronicus	Royal Shakespeare Company, Swan Theatre, Stratford-upon-Avon
2026	Jesus Christ Superstar	King Herod	Theatre Royal, Drury Lane
2026	I'll Be Seeing You	Liberace	Pitlochry Festival Theatre
2026	''Venus and Adonis''	Narrator	UK tour including Barbican Centre, Oxford Playhouse

- Also appeared as Sir Politic Wouldbe, Volpone; title role, Richard III; and in The Man of Mode; Troilus and Cressida; Die Hose, Traverse Theatre; The Death of Elias Sawney, Traverse Theatre; Sandro Manon, Traverse Theatre; Look to the Rainbow, Apollo Theatre; Women Beware Women, Royal Court Theatre; A Winter's Tale; Everyman in His Humour; The Art of Success; The Fair Maid of the West; Speculators; The Storm; The Constant Couple; Restoration; Some Americans Abroad; Mary and Lizzie; Playing with Trains; Edward II; Love's Labour's Lost; King Lear; Ghosts; Candide; Summerfolk.

== Patronage ==
Beale is a patron of the following organisations:

- English Touring Theatre
- South London Theatre
- London Symphony Chorus
- For Short Theatre Company
- Diamond Fund for Choristers

== See also ==
- List of actors in Royal Shakespeare Company productions
- List of British actors
