= Hotel (British TV series) =

BBC television episode

- Genre: Documentary
- Directed by: Neil Grant
- Starring: Eileen Downey; Brian Birchall
- Narrated by: Andrew Sachs
- Country of origin: United Kingdom
- Original language: English
- No. of series: 1
- No. of episodes: 8

Production
- Production location: Adelphi Hotel
- Running time: 30 minutes
- Production company: Lion Television

Original release
- Network: BBC1
- Release: 3 November – 22 December 1997

Hotel is a 1997 eight-episode BBC "fly on the wall" production that followed the general day-to-day running of a hotel giving viewers a rare glimpse of life behind the scenes of the Britannia Adelphi Hotel in Liverpool. The series first aired 3 November 1997 on BBC1 with the first episode receiving viewing figures on 11 million. The series was directed by Neil Grant and narrated by Andrew Sachs.

== Employees depicted ==
Character/ Employee	Position	Description
Eileen Downey	Hotel Manager	Key Character of the show known as the Ferocious Boss
Brian Birchall	Deputy Manager	Famous for the quote – "JUST COOK WILL YER"
David Smith	Head Chef	Became famous on Mersey FM following his argument with Brian
Christine	Senior Receptionist	known as the pregnant lady with the bump
Robert Hallmark	Hotel Porter	Frequently in trouble for mischief & a professional skiver
Mrs Owens	Biscuits	Well known for selling over 300 cups of tea after the ill-fated 1997 Grand National.
Paul	Manager	Bearded and generally affable mattress arranger
Mal	Security	Eileen's henchman, responsible for escorting an unruly guest from reception
Martin Mouse	Bloke	Occasional visitor to hotel rooms

== Just cook, will yer? ==
The phrase "Just cook, will yer?" became famous within Liverpool area, following the scenes in an episode when an argument between Deputy manager Brian Birchall and head chef David Smith resulted in the phrase being bellowed by Brian. The outburst became a local catch-phrase and was printed on T-shirts and various merchandise. The phrase also made it into the charts after it was released as a single by Alternative Radio

== Criticism ==
Following the first episode the Britannia Hotel chain owner reported that he felt the hotel had been poorly portrayed and criticised the BBC for screening scenes that showed the hotel staff trying to handle the situation following the Irish Republican Army (IRA) bomb threat during the 1997 Grand National.
