= The Lehman Trilogy =

2013 three-act play by Stefano Massini

- Original language: Italian
- Written by: Stefano Massini
- Subject: Lehman Brothers

Premiere
- Date: October 8, 2013
- Place: Comédie de Saint-Étienne (Saint-Étienne - France)

The Lehman Trilogy is a three-act play by Italian novelist and playwright Stefano Massini. It follows the lives of three immigrant brothers from when they arrived in America and founded an investment firm through the collapse of Lehman Brothers in 2008. It has been translated into 24 languages, staged by such directors as Luca Ronconi and Sam Mendes, and was later published as a novel in English. An English translation of the play by Mirella Cheeseman was produced at the National Theatre in 2018. The production, featuring three actors and one pianist, was directed by Sam Mendes and included the cast of Simon Russell Beale, Adam Godley and Ben Miles. It earned five Laurence Olivier Award nominations.

The production made its Broadway transfer in March 2020 and performed briefly before the COVID-19 pandemic. The play resumed performances in fall 2021 with Adrian Lester replacing Ben Miles. The production received universal critical acclaim and eight Tony Award nominations, winning five awards including for Best Play, Best Direction of a Play for Sam Mendes, and Best Actor in a Play for Simon Russell Beale.

The play has been criticized both for playing down the role of the Lehman family in slavery and for the crude, caricatured way in which it portrays the Jewishness of the protagonists.

== Productions ==
The Lehman Trilogy opened at Comédie de Saint-Étienne in Saint-Étienne in a French translation. In 2015 Luca Ronconi directed the Italian premiere, at Piccolo Teatro in Milan. The play was eventually translated and staged in several cities across Europe.

Translated by Mirella Cheeseman, adapted by British playwright Ben Power from Massini's epic poem, and directed by British director Sam Mendes, the play made its English debut in London at the National Theatre in the Lyttelton Theatre, running from 12 July 2018 to 20 October 2018.

The National Theatre's staging of the play transferred to the United States at the Park Avenue Armory, in New York City, from 22 March 2019 to 20 April 2019.

This production then returned to the West End Piccadilly Theatre starting on 11 May 2019 for a limited twelve week run, which was extended for another 4 weeks, ending on 31 August 2019.

The National Theatre production was set to revisit the United States, originally to open on Broadway at the Nederlander Theatre on 7 March 2020 in previews, officially on 26 March. Adam Godley, Ben Miles, and Simon Russell Beale, who play the three title brothers, their sons, and grandsons, would reprise their performances. As of 12 March 2020, the show suspended production due to the COVID-19 pandemic. In June 2021, it was reported that The Lehman Trilogy would reopen in previews on 25 September 2021 and officially on 14 October. Godley and Beale would return to the production, while Adrian Lester would replace Miles. The Broadway production's final performance was on 2 January 2022.

The National Theatre production appeared at the Ahmanson Theatre in Los Angeles in a limited engagement from 3 March 2022 through 10 April 2022, starring Godley, Beale, and Howard W. Overshown, Miles' understudy from the Broadway production. The production was scheduled to continue in San Francisco at the American Conservatory Theater, but was indefinitely postponed on 3 March 2022 with the National Theatre Productions Managing Director citing "a myriad of obstacles that left us unable to say with confidence when the show can arrive in the Bay Area".

The production returned to London's West End at the Gillian Lynne Theatre for a limited season from 14 January to 20 May 2023, starring Nigel Lindsay, Michael Balogun and Hadley Fraser.

An international tour began performances at The Theatre Royal, Sydney in February 2024, with a cast featuring Adrian Schiller, Aaron Krohn and Howard W. Overshown. The production toured to San Francisco at the American Conservatory Theater in May and June 2024, with John Heffernan replacing Schiller, who died in April 2024.

In September 2024 the production returned again to the Gillian Lynne Theatre in London's West End for a strictly limited run from 24 September 2024 to 5 January 2025, seeing the same main cast as the International tour.

== Overview ==
Mendes said: "The Lehman Trilogy was developed over three years without the constraint of a schedule, or even a plan — it was allowed time to find its form, and to build a wonderful team with which to make it. One of the chief joys has been to work across borders with two great writers, and to invite three of the finest actors of their generation to work with us. We are indebted to the National Theatre and the Park Avenue Armory for their unstinting support throughout..."

The original play lasts for five hours and Power has written it into a three-hour English version. With a cast of only three actors, Simon Russell Beale, Ben Miles, and Adam Godley, the play explores the vicissitude of American capitalism through the 164-year-history of Lehman Brothers, from when Henry Lehman, a German Jew, first migrated to the U.S. and opened his store in Alabama, to the bankruptcy of Lehman Brothers that exacerbated the 2008 financial crisis.

== Cast ==
Role	Milan	London	Off-Broadway	West End	Broadway	Los Angeles	West End revival	International Tour / West End revival
Role	2015	2018	2019		2021	2022	2023	2024
Henry Lehman	Massimo De Francovich	Simon Russell Beale	Simon Russell Beale	Simon Russell Beale	Simon Russell Beale	Simon Russell Beale	Nigel Lindsay	John Heffernan
Emanuel Lehman	Fabrizio Gifuni	Ben Miles	Ben Miles	Ben Miles	Adrian Lester	Howard W. Overshown	Michael Balogun	Howard W. Overshown
Mayer Lehman	Massimo Popolizio	Adam Godley	Adam Godley	Adam Godley	Adam Godley	Adam Godley	Hadley Fraser	Aaron Krohn

The three actors not only play the three Lehman brothers who founded the business but all other roles. They play their children and grandchildren, including Philip Lehman (son of Emanuel, played by Simon Russell Beale), Herbert Lehman (son of Mayer, played by Ben Miles), and Robert Lehman (son of Philip, played by Adam Godley), as well as various minor characters during the unfolding of family history such as wives, toddlers, and business partners, although they never change the original costume – tailored three-piece suits often seen in 19th-century portraits of men. The understudies for the roles of Henry, Emanuel, and Mayer Lehman at the National Theatre were Leighton Pugh, Dominik Tiefenthaler, and Will Harrison-Wallace, respectively. Tiefenthaler replaced Miles during the show's run at the Piccadilly Theatre.

== Reviews ==
The play has been highly praised by critics for "the successful adaptation that both preserves the essence, the poetic language of the original play and makes it more succinct"; "the elegant, well-paced direction that narrates with simplicity, depth and richness"; and "the superb, versatile acting of the cast, who seem to metamorphose at will with the characters they put on". The set design by Es Devlin – a rotating glass box furnished in the style of a contemporary office, as well as the video projection in the back stage that accompany the set, showing the changing landscapes in time and space during the development of the business and American capitalism created by Luke Halls, also made a great impression. Both The Guardian and The Times give the play a five-star mark. The New York Times called the Broadway production "captivating" and "a vividly human tale, nimbly performed by three of the finest actors around".

The play has been critiqued for downplaying the Lehman family's involvement with slavery. Sarah Churchwell, writing for The New York Review of Books, criticized the play for "profoundly underplaying not only the firm’s deep entanglement in the slave economy, but also that of the brothers themselves, who held slaves for at least twenty years." The Washington Post's Richard Cohen wrote that the play was "silent" on the issue of slavery and that the playwright should have addressed the topic because "To not mention slavery is in itself a statement — of disinterest, of unimportance, of lesser importance, of something. Would an American playwright, confronted on a daily basis with the economic, cultural and historical ramifications of slavery, have made the same decision? I can’t imagine it."

== Antisemitism row ==
The play and the National Theatre performances in London have been flagged as antisemitic and racist, showcasing centuries-old stereotypes of Jews as greedy and immoral.

Dave Rich accused the play of perpetuating negative, historical stereotypes about Jews and money writing in The Observer, said:

It is gratuitous and overwhelming, far beyond what is necessary to convey the biographical fact that the Lehmans were Jewish. It leaves you feeling that this is not only a play about bankers who are Jews, but a play about Jews who are bankers. And what does it tell us about these Jews? Mainly that they love money and will do anything to get more of it...The Lehman Brothers did not invent the role of middlemen or brokers and they weren’t the only ones to perform this role, but you wouldn’t know that from the play. The charge that Jews are economic parasites, generating unproductive profit from the honest toil of others, has been a staple of anti-Jewish propaganda for centuries.

Writing in the Jewish Chronicle Karen Glaser said:

What was the National Theatre thinking when it decided to bring this play, which taps into every antisemitic trope you have ever heard about Jews and money, back to the London stage – and to stage one of the run’s performances on the anniversary of the biggest massacre of Jews in a single day since the Holocaust?

== Awards and nominations ==
=== Original London production ===
Year	Award	Category	Nominated work	Result	Ref.
2018	Evening Standard Theatre Award	Best Play		Nominated	
2019	Laurence Olivier Award	Best New Play		Nominated	
2019	Laurence Olivier Award	Best Actor	Simon Russell Beale, Adam Godley and Ben Miles	Nominated	
2019	Laurence Olivier Award	Best Director	Sam Mendes	Nominated	
2019	Laurence Olivier Award	Best Set Design	Es Devlin	Nominated	
2019	Laurence Olivier Award	Best Sound Design	Nick Powell and Dominic Bilkey	Nominated	

=== Original Broadway production ===
Year	Award	Category	Nominated work	Result	Ref.
2022	Drama League Awards	Outstanding Production of a Play		Won	
2022	Drama League Awards	Outstanding Director of a Play	Sam Mendes	Nominated	
2022	Drama League Awards	Distinguished Performance Award	Simon Russell Beale	Nominated	
2022	Outer Critics Circle Award	Outstanding New Broadway Play		Won	
2022	Outer Critics Circle Award	Outstanding Actor in a Play	Simon Russell Beale	Won	
2022	Outer Critics Circle Award	Outstanding Actor in a Play	Adam Godley	Nominated	
2022	Outer Critics Circle Award	Outstanding Actor in a Play	Adrian Lester	Nominated	
2022	Outer Critics Circle Award	Outstanding Director of a Play	Sam Mendes	Won	
2022	Outer Critics Circle Award	Outstanding Scenic Design (Play or Musical)	Es Devlin	Nominated	
2022	Outer Critics Circle Award	Outstanding Lighting Design (Play or Musical)	Jon Clark	Won	
2022	Outer Critics Circle Award	Outstanding Sound Design (Play or Musical)	Nick Powell and Dominic Bilkey	Won	
2022	Outer Critics Circle Award	Outstanding Video/Projection Design (Play or Musical)	Luke Halls	Won	
2022	Tony Awards	Best Play		Won	
2022	Tony Awards	Best Actor in a Play	Simon Russell Beale	Won	
2022	Tony Awards	Best Actor in a Play	Adam Godley	Nominated	
2022	Tony Awards	Best Actor in a Play	Adrian Lester	Nominated	
2022	Tony Awards	Best Direction of a Play	Sam Mendes	Won	
2022	Tony Awards	Best Scenic Design in a Play	Es Devlin	Won	
2022	Tony Awards	Best Lighting Design in a Play	Jon Clark	Won	
2022	Tony Awards	Best Sound Design of a Play	Nick Powell and Dominik Bilkey	Nominated	

== Novel ==
The story was further developed into a novel published in Italian in 2016 under the title Qualcosa sui Lehman, and appeared in English in 2020 as The Lehman Trilogy, translated by Richard Dixon.

== See also ==
- Lehman Family
