= Thriller Villa =

Former home of Michael Jackson, in Las Vegas

General information
- Status: Open (Venue for private events)
- Location: Las Vegas, Nevada, 2710 Palomino Lane, United States
- Coordinates: 36.1629°N 115.1786°W
- Current tenants: Aner Iglesias (owner; 2004–present)
- Completed: 1952

Height
- Architectural: Spanish-Mediterranean

Technical details
- Floor area: 27,259 square feet (2,532.4 m^{2})

Design and construction
- Known for: Home of Michael Jackson (2007–2009)

"Thriller Villa" is a nickname given to the former home of singer Michael Jackson, located in Las Vegas, Nevada close to the strip, originally called Hacienda Palomino. The Mexican Hacienda-style complex contains three independent apartments, as well as three bedrooms, two kitchens, two bars, nine bathrooms and extensive exhibit areas, conference areas and a chapel-themed performing arts theater, all encompassing 27,259 square feet (2,532.4 m^{2}). Though realtors and press have often repeated the claim by a promoter in 2007 stating it was built in 1952 by theater developer Horst Schmidt, the construction actually took place between 1993 and 1998, and replaced a small homestead dating from 1956, according to Clark County records, long-term neighbors and in accordance with building materials used. Jackson lived in the property from 2007 until his death in 2009. The home has occasionally been listed for sale, though the owner has never accepted any offers.

In late 2006, Michael Jackson returned to the United States after living in Bahrain for nearly a year. Jackson lived at the site with his 3 children. He moved to Vegas in an attempt to negotiate a contract for a residency show on the Strip. The property interior was completely re-designed in 2012 by Paulina Biggs Sparkuhl, after being branded "Thriller Villa" by Jonathan Warren in 2011. The property remains the private residence of its owner, the Honorary Consul of El Salvador, and has hosted diplomatic events, as well as performances supporting the Arts.
