= A Dance to the Music of Time (TV series) =

1997 British television series

- Genre: Drama
- Created by: Anthony Powell
- Based on: A Dance to the Music of Time by Anthony Powell
- Screenplay by: Hugh Whitemore
- Directed by: Christopher Morahan; Alvin Rakoff
- Starring: Gillian Barge; Nicholas Jones; Simon Russell Beale; Robin Bailey; Jonathan Cake; James Fleet; Richard Pasco; James Purefoy; Paul Rhys; Annabel Mullion; Claire Skinner; Adrian Scarborough; Grant Thatcher
- Country of origin: United Kingdom
- Original language: English
- No. of series: 1
- No. of episodes: 4

Production
- Executive producer: Hugh Whitemore
- Producer: Alvin Rakoff
- Running time: 416 minutes
- Production company: Daisybeck

Original release
- Network: Channel 4
- Release: 9 October – 30 October 1997

A Dance to the Music of Time is a British four-part television drama series based on the book series of the same name by Anthony Powell. The series was also written by Anthony Powell with Hugh Whitemore as co-writer. The series was produced by Table Top Productions and directed by Christopher Morahan and Alvin Rakoff. It was first broadcast on Channel 4 on 9 October 1997 over four consecutive weeks.

== Synopsis ==
A Dance to the Music of Time follows the life of Nicholas Jenkins and the large, shifting circle of people around him from his schooldays in the early 1920s to the post-war world of the 1960s. Told largely from Jenkins’s observant and often detached point of view, the story traces the friendships, marriages, affairs, professional ambitions, rivalries and social manoeuvrings of several generations of British upper- and upper-middle-class society.

At its centre are Jenkins’s contemporaries, Charles Stringham, Peter Templer, and Kenneth Widmerpool. Kenneth, the most prominently featured of the three, is an awkward and initially ridiculous schoolmate whose ambition carries him through business, politics and public life. Their paths repeatedly cross over the following forty years, sometimes after long periods apart, as old acquaintances unexpectedly reappear in new circumstances and relationships are reshaped.

Jenkins himself moves through literary, artistic and fashionable circles, encountering writers, painters, musicians, aristocrats, businessmen, soldiers and politicians. His marriage to Isobel Tolland draws him into the sprawling Tolland family, while figures such as the novelist X. Trapnel, the musician Hugh Moreland and the formidable Pamela Flitton become increasingly important in the later story.

The narrative passes through the prosperity and uncertainty of the 1920s, the political and social tensions of the 1930s, Jenkins’s wartime service during the Second World War, and the altered society that emerges afterwards. Although major historical events form the background, the emphasis remains on private lives: who rises and falls, who marries whom, how friendships endure or decay, and how apparently insignificant encounters acquire meaning many years later.

Rather than following a single conventional plot, the series is constructed as an accumulation of meetings, recollections and coincidences. Characters enter and leave Jenkins’s life like figures in a dance, sometimes changing dramatically between appearances and sometimes seeming almost incapable of change. Through them, the story examines ambition, class, sex, loyalty, ageing, artistic creation and the gradual disappearance of the social world in which its characters began.

The television adaptation condenses Anthony Powell’s twelve-novel sequence into four episodes, preserving the broad sweep of Jenkins’s life and many of the principal characters while necessarily reducing or omitting a considerable number of incidents, relationships and subsidiary figures from the books.

== Cast ==
- Gillian Barge as Mrs. Erdleigh
- Nicholas Jones as Bob Duport
- Simon Russell Beale as Widmerpool
- Robin Bailey as Uncle Alfred
- Jonathan Cake as Peter Templer
- James Fleet as Moreland
- Richard Pasco as Sir Magnus Donners
- James Purefoy as Nicholas Jenkins
- Paul Rhys as Charles Stringham
- Annabel Mullion as Mona
- Claire Skinner as Jean
- Adrian Scarborough as JG Quiggin
- Grant Thatcher as Mark Members
- Sarah Badel as Lady Molly
- Alan Bennett as Sillery
- Emma Fielding as Isobel
- Oliver Ford Davies as Le Bas
- Edward Fox as Uncle Giles
- Anastasia Hille as Matilda
- Nigel Lindsay as Odo Stevens
- Miranda Richardson as Pamela Flitton
- Zoë Wanamaker as Audrey Maclintick
- Michael Williams as Ted Jeavons
- Geraldine Alexander as Susan
- Carmen Du Sautoy as Miss Weedon
- Nicholas Rowe as David Pennistone
- Barbara Durkin as Betty
- Andrew Havill as Sunny Farebrother
- Osmund Bullock as Erridge
- Caroline Harker as Priscilla
- Tony Osoba as Colonel Flores
- Bryan Pringle as Smith
- Eileen Atkins as Brightman
- Sean Baker as X Trapnel
- Paul Brooke as Maclintick
- James D'Arcy as Nicholas Jenkins when a student
- James Callis as Gwinnett
- Kevin Colson as Louis Glober
- Joanna David as older Isobel
- John Gielgud as St. John Clarke
- Patrick Godfrey as General Conyers
- Luke de Lacey as Stringham when a student
- Lucy Fleming as Jean
- Frank Middlemass as Edgar Deacon
- Christopher Lang as Chips Lovell
- Robert Lang as Leonard Short
- Emily Mortimer as Polly Duport
- Julian Wadham as General Liddament
- Sonia Ritter as Ada
- John Standing as older Nicholas Jenkins
- Nicola Walker as Gypsy Jones
- Kevin Harris as the son of Nicholas and Isobel Jenkins
- Colin Baker as Canon Fenneau

== Episodes ==
No.	Title	Directed by	Written by	Original release date	U.K. viewers (millions)
1	"The Twenties"	Alvin Rakoff	Anthony Powell and Hugh Whitemore	9 October 1997	N/A
2	"The Thirties"	Christopher Morahan	Anthony Powell and Hugh Whitemore	16 October 1997	N/A
3	"The War"	Alvin Rakoff	Anthony Powell and Hugh Whitemore	23 October 1997	N/A
4	"Post War"	Christopher Morahan	Anthony Powell and Hugh Whitemore	30 October 1997	N/A

== Critical reception ==
The Thomas Sutcliffe of The Independent described the first episode in the series by saying "It's questionable whether any literary work can survive a compression as intense as that undergone by A Dance to the Music of Time" and went on to mention "For obvious reasons barely even a homeopathic trace of Powell's patrician ruminations remain - what has survived are the incidents upon which he strung his grand reflections."

=== Accolades ===
Year	Award	Category	Recipient(s)	Result	Ref.
1998	British Academy Television Awards	Best Actor	Simon Russell Beale	Won	
1998	British Academy Television Awards	Best Actress	Miranda Richardson	Nominated	
1998	Royal Television Society Awards	Actor: Male	Simon Russell Beale	Won	
1998	Royal Television Society Awards	Actor: Female	Miranda Richardson	Nominated	
