= List of accolades received by In Bruges =

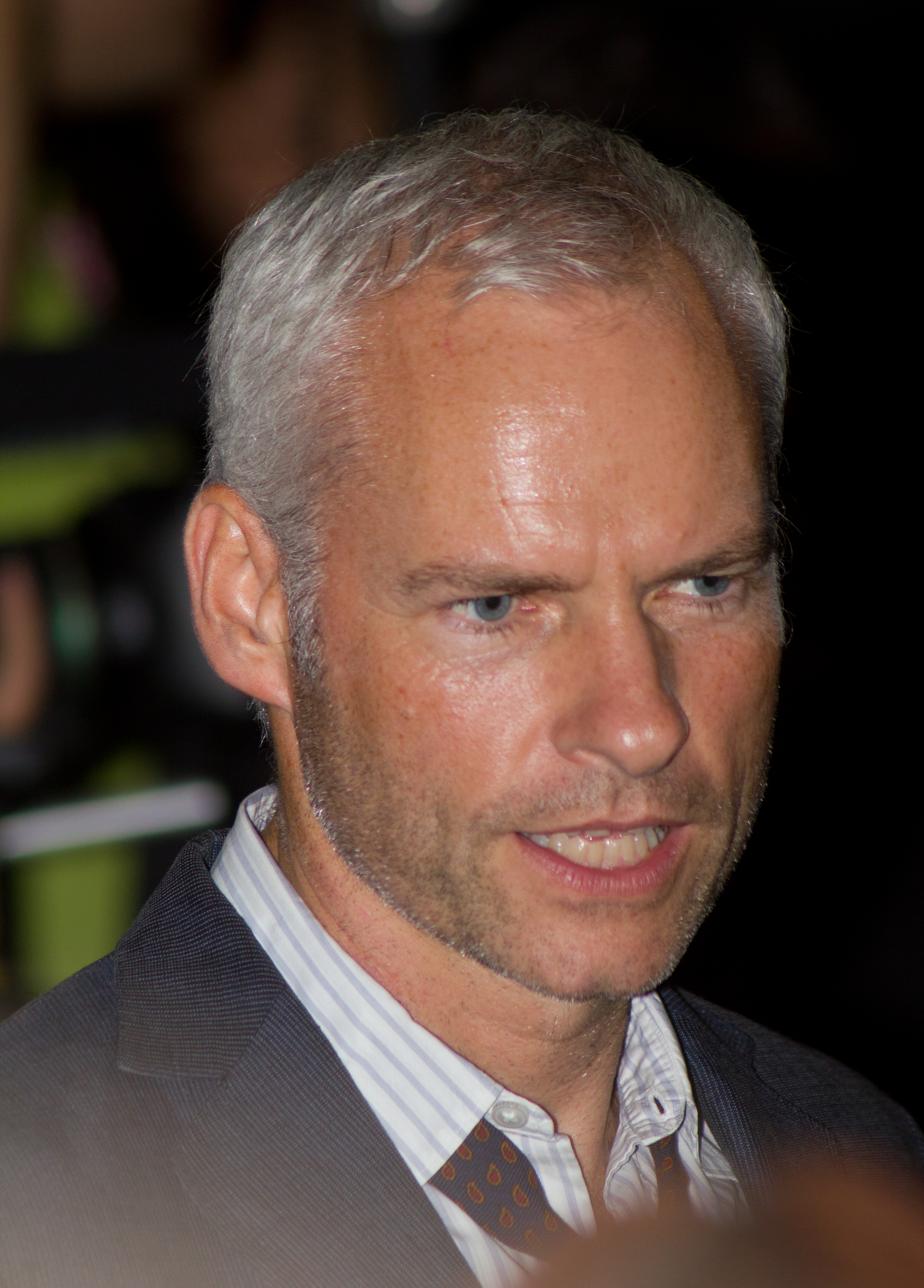
- Martin McDonagh received several accolades for his screenplay.
Awards and nominations
Award	Wins	Nominations
Academy Awards	0	1
American Cinema Editors Eddie Awards	0	1
Boston Society of Film Critics	1	1
British Academy Film Awards	1	4
British Independent Film Awards	1	7
Chicago Film Critics Association	0	2
Chlotrudis Awards	0	2
Detroit Film Critics Society	1	1
Dublin Film Critics' Circle	1	1
Edgar Awards	1	1
Empire Awards	0	2
Evening Standard British Film Awards	1	1
Film Critics Circle of Australia	0	1
Florida Film Critics Circle	1	1
Golden Globe Awards	1	3
Golden Reel Awards	0	1
Golden Trailer Awards	1	3
IndieWire Critics Poll	0	2
International Cinephile Society	1	6
Irish Film & Television Awards	2	5
London Film Critics' Circle	0	3
National Board of Review	1	1
New York Film Critics Online	1	1
Online Film Critics Society	0	2
Phoenix Film Critics Society	3	3
Russian National Movie Awards	1	1
Satellite Awards	0	2
Saturn Awards	0	1
Stockholm International Film Festival	0	1
Sydney Film Festival	0	1

Totals (Note: Certain award groups do not simply award one winner. They acknowledge several different recipients, have runners-up, and have third place. Since this is a specific recognition and is different from losing an award, runner-up mentions are considered wins in this award tally. For simplification and to avoid errors, each award in this list has been presumed to have had a prior nomination.)
- Wins: 19
- Nominations: 62

In Bruges is a 2008 black comedy thriller film written and directed by Martin McDonagh in his feature-length directorial debut. The film follows Ray (Colin Farrell) and Ken (Brendan Gleeson), two Irish hitmen hiding in Bruges, Belgium, awaiting orders from their mob boss Harry (Ralph Fiennes). Clémence Poésy, Jordan Prentice, Jérémie Renier, Eric Godon and Željko Ivanek appear in supporting roles.

In Bruges premiered as the opening film of the Sundance Film Festival on 17 January 2008. Focus Features gave the film a limited release in the United States on 8 February 2008. In Bruges had its Irish premiere at the Dublin International Film Festival on 15 February 2008. Universal Pictures gave it a full release in Ireland on 7 March 2008, before it opened on 18 April 2008 in the United Kingdom. In Bruges earned $34.5 million at the box office against a production budget of $15 million. On the review aggregator website Rotten Tomatoes, the film holds an approval rating of 84% based on 210 reviews.

In Bruges garnered awards and nominations from a variety of categories, with particular recognition for McDonagh's screenplay and the performances of Farrell and Gleeson. McDonagh was nominated for Best Original Screenplay at the 81st Academy Awards. At the 62nd British Academy Film Awards, In Bruges received four nominations including Outstanding British Film and Best Actor in a Supporting Role (Gleeson), with McDonagh winning for Best Original Screenplay. The film received three nominations at the 66th Golden Globe Awards: Best Motion Picture – Musical or Comedy, and Best Actor in a Motion Picture – Musical or Comedy for Farrell and Gleeson, with Farrell winning.

In Bruges received seven nominations at the British Independent Film Awards, including Best British Independent Film, with McDonagh winning Best Screenplay. In Bruges was nominated for two Satellite Awards, including Best Motion Picture, Comedy or Musical. At the 6th Irish Film & Television Awards, the film received five nominations, winning for Best International Film and Best Film Script for McDonagh. It was listed as one of the top 10 independent films of 2008 by the National Board of Review.

== Accolades ==
Accolades received by In Bruges
Award	Date of ceremony	Category	Recipient(s)	Result	Ref(s).
Academy Awards	22 February 2009	Best Original Screenplay	Martin McDonagh	Nominated	
American Cinema Editors Eddie Awards	15 February 2009	Best Edited Feature Film – Comedy or Musical	Jon Gregory	Nominated	
Boston Society of Film Critics	14 December 2008	Best New Filmmaker	Martin McDonagh	Won	
British Academy Film Awards	8 February 2009	Outstanding British Film	Graham Broadbent, Peter Czernin and Martin McDonagh	Nominated	
British Academy Film Awards	8 February 2009	Best Original Screenplay	Martin McDonagh	Won	
British Academy Film Awards	8 February 2009	Best Actor in a Supporting Role	Brendan Gleeson	Nominated	
British Academy Film Awards	8 February 2009	Best Editing	Jon Gregory	Nominated	
British Independent Film Awards	30 November 2008	Best British Independent Film	In Bruges	Nominated	
British Independent Film Awards	30 November 2008	Best Performance by an Actor in a British Independent Film	Colin Farrell	Nominated	
British Independent Film Awards	30 November 2008	Best Performance by an Actor in a British Independent Film	Brendan Gleeson	Nominated	
British Independent Film Awards	30 November 2008	Best Supporting Actor	Ralph Fiennes	Nominated	
British Independent Film Awards	30 November 2008	Best Screenplay	Martin McDonagh	Won	
British Independent Film Awards	30 November 2008	Douglas Hickox Award	Martin McDonagh	Nominated	
British Independent Film Awards	30 November 2008	Best Technical Achievement	Jon Gregory (for film editing)	Nominated	
Chicago Film Critics Association	18 December 2008	Best Original Screenplay	Martin McDonagh	Nominated	
Chicago Film Critics Association	18 December 2008	Most Promising Filmmaker	Martin McDonagh	Nominated	
Chlotrudis Awards	22 March 2009	Best Actor	Brendan Gleeson	Nominated	
Chlotrudis Awards	22 March 2009	Best Original Screenplay	Martin McDonagh	Nominated	
Detroit Film Critics Society	19 December 2008	Best Newcomer	Martin McDonagh	Won	
Dublin Film Critics' Circle	20 January 2009	Breakthrough Artist	Martin McDonagh	Runner-up	
Edgar Awards	30 April 2009	Best Motion Picture Screenplay	Martin McDonagh	Won	
Empire Awards	29 March 2009	Best British Film	In Bruges	Nominated	
Empire Awards	29 March 2009	Best Comedy	In Bruges	Nominated	
Evening Standard British Film Awards	1 February 2009	Best Screenplay	Martin McDonagh	Won	
Film Critics Circle of Australia	13 February 2009	Best Foreign Film – English Language	Martin McDonagh	Nominated	
Florida Film Critics Circle	18 December 2008	Pauline Kael Breakout Award	Martin McDonagh	Won	
Golden Globe Awards	11 January 2009	Best Motion Picture – Musical or Comedy	In Bruges	Nominated	
Golden Globe Awards	11 January 2009	Best Actor in a Motion Picture – Musical or Comedy	Colin Farrell	Won	
Golden Globe Awards	11 January 2009	Best Actor in a Motion Picture – Musical or Comedy	Brendan Gleeson	Nominated	
Golden Reel Awards	21 February 2009	Best Sound Editing – Sound Effects, Foley, Dialogue and ADR in a Foreign Feature Film	Julian Slater, Dan Morgan, Robert Brazier, James Harrison, Arthur Graley, Peter Burgis, Andie Derrick, Sue Harding, and Rowena Wilkinson	Nominated	
Golden Trailer Awards	8 May 2008	Most Original	Focus Features	Won	
Golden Trailer Awards	8 May 2008	Most Original TV Spot	Focus Features (for "Hideout")	Nominated	
Golden Trailer Awards	8 May 2008	Best Comedy Poster	Focus Features and Mojo, LLC (for "One Sheet")	Nominated	
IndieWire Critics Poll	24 December 2008	Best Screenplay	Martin McDonagh	3rd place (Note: Tied with Joel and Ethan Coen for Burn After Reading, Mike Leigh for Happy-Go-Lucky, and Jenny Lumet for Rachel Getting Married)	
IndieWire Critics Poll	24 December 2008	Best First Feature	Martin McDonagh	8th place (Note: Tied with Etgar Keret and Shira Geffen for Jellyfish, Barry Jenkins for Medicine for Melancholy, and Kerri O'Kane for The Gits)	
International Cinephile Society	13 February 2009	Best Picture	In Bruges	9th place	
International Cinephile Society	13 February 2009	Best Actor	Colin Farrell	Nominated	
International Cinephile Society	13 February 2009	Best Supporting Actor	Ralph Fiennes	Nominated	
International Cinephile Society	13 February 2009	Best Original Screenplay	Martin McDonagh	Won	
International Cinephile Society	13 February 2009	Best Editing	Jon Gregory	Nominated	
International Cinephile Society	13 February 2009	Best Original Score	Carter Burwell	Nominated	
Irish Film & Television Awards	14 February 2009	Best Director – Film	Martin McDonagh	Nominated	
Irish Film & Television Awards	14 February 2009	Best Script – Film	Martin McDonagh	Won	
Irish Film & Television Awards	14 February 2009	Best Lead Actor – Film	Colin Farrell	Nominated	
Irish Film & Television Awards	14 February 2009	Best Lead Actor – Film	Brendan Gleeson	Nominated	
Irish Film & Television Awards	14 February 2009	Best International Film	In Bruges	Won	
London Film Critics' Circle	4 February 2009	British Film of the Year	In Bruges	Nominated	
London Film Critics' Circle	4 February 2009	Screenwriter of the Year	Martin McDonagh	Nominated	
London Film Critics' Circle	4 February 2009	Breakthrough British Filmmaker	Martin McDonagh	Nominated	
National Board of Review	12 January 2009	Top 10 Independent Films	In Bruges	Won (Note: This award does not have a single winner, but recognizes multiple films.)	
New York Film Critics Online	14 December 2008	Best Debut Director	Martin McDonagh	Won	
Online Film Critics Society	19 January 2009	Best Original Screenplay	Martin McDonagh	Nominated	
Online Film Critics Society	19 January 2009	Breakthrough Filmmaker	Martin McDonagh	Nominated	
Phoenix Film Critics Society	16 December 2008	Best Screenplay Written Directly for the Screen	Martin McDonagh	Won	
Phoenix Film Critics Society	16 December 2008	Best Overlooked Film	In Bruges	Won	
Phoenix Film Critics Society	16 December 2008	Breakout Behind the Camera	Martin McDonagh	Won	
Satellite Awards	14 December 2008	Best Motion Picture, Comedy or Musical	In Bruges	Nominated	
Satellite Awards	14 December 2008	Best Actor in a Motion Picture, Comedy or Musical	Brendan Gleeson	Nominated	
Saturn Awards	25 June 2009	Best International Film	In Bruges	Nominated	
Russian National Movie Awards	13 April 2009	Best Independent Movie	In Bruges	Won	
Stockholm International Film Festival	29 November 2008	Bronze Horse	Martin McDonagh	Nominated	
Sydney Film Festival	16 June 2008	Sydney Film Prize	Martin McDonagh	Nominated	
