= Christopher Baker =

Christopher Baker may refer to:

- Christopher Robin Baker (1937–2011), British television director and production assistant
- Christopher Paul Baker (born 1955), English travel writer and photographer
- Christopher W. Baker (born 1956), British landscape artist
- Christopher James Baker, Australian actor
- Christopher Baker (Manitoba politician), Canadian politician

== See also ==
- Chris Baker (disambiguation)
- Christopher Barker (disambiguation)
