= Exhibition (film) =

- Promotional poster
- Directed by: Joanna Hogg
- Written by: Joanna Hogg
- Produced by: Gayle Griffiths
- Starring: Viv Albertine; Liam Gillick; Tom Hiddleston
- Cinematography: Ed Rutherford
- Edited by: Helle le Fevre
- Production companies: BBC Films; Rooks Nest Entertainment; Wild Horses Film Company; British Film Institute
- Distributed by: Artificial Eye
- Release dates: 9 August 2013 (Locarno Film Festival); 25 April 2014 (UK)
- Running time: 104 minutes
- Country: United Kingdom
- Language: English

Exhibition (aka London Project) is a 2013 drama film written and directed by Joanna Hogg, starring Viv Albertine, Liam Gillick, and Tom Hiddleston. The film premiered at the Locarno Film Festival in August 2013, and was released in the UK on 25 April 2014.

== Summary ==
A contemporary artist couple, D (Albertine) and H (Gillick), have their living and working patterns threatened when their house is put up for sale.

== Cast ==
- Liam Gillick as H
- Viv Albertine as D
- Tom Hiddleston as Jamie Macmillan
- Harry Kershaw as Estate Agent
- Mary Roscoe as Neighbour Guest

== Production ==
=== Development ===
Writer and director Joanna Hogg and actor Tom Hiddleston previously worked together on Hogg's 2007 film Unrelated and her 2010 film Archipelago.

=== Filming ===
Filming started in October 2012 and took place over the course of 6 weeks in London.

== Reception ==
Exhibition has an approval rating of 85% on review aggregator website Rotten Tomatoes, based on 33 reviews, and an average rating of 7.3/10. The website's critical consensus states: "Exhibition flouts convention with its untrained stars and impressionistic narrative; thankfully, writer-director Joanna Hogg ties it all together into an intimate, beautifully shot drama". Metacritic assigned the film a weighted average score of 72 out of 100, based on 14 critics, indicating "generally favorable reviews".
