= Kate Fahy =

English actress and director

- Born: Birmingham
- Occupation: Actor
- Years active: 1971–present
- Spouse: Sir Jonathan Pryce (m. 2015)
- Children: 3

Kate Fahy, Lady Pryce is an English actor. She is known primarily for playing Patricia in Joanna Hogg's 2010 film Archipelago and playing Stevie in Edward Albee's play The Goat or Who is Sylvia at the Almeida Theatre and the Apollo West End. She has worked extensively in theatre, film and television since 1971.

== Career ==
Fahy trained at the Bristol Old Vic Theatre School. She made her theatre debut at the Playhouse Theatre in Liverpool in Ray Cooney's Not Now Darling, followed by two years at the Everyman Theatre in Liverpool playing leading roles in The Taming of The Shrew, The Country Wife, Ted Whitehead's The Sea Anchor and Mike Stott's Funny Peculiar. Her television career started soon after with Arthur Hopcraft's series The Nearly Man at Granada, directed by John Irvin. She has since appeared in numerous stage plays, television and feature films both in the UK and the US.

In recent years she has directed three plays, Oliver Cotton's Wet Weather Cover at the Kings Head and Arts Theatre WE, Jean-Claude Carriere's play Little Black Book at Park Theatre, and again at Park Theatre, Alexander Bodin-Saphir's play Rosenbaum's Rescue.

She played Stevie in the first London production of Edward Albee's The Goat, opposite her partner Jonathan Pryce.

== Personal life ==
Fahy has been married twice. She met actor Jonathan Pryce in 1972. They had three children, and married in 2015.

== Filmography ==
Year	Film	Role	Notes
1975	The Nearly Man	Millie Dutton	TV series (5 episodes)
1978	The Sweeney	Julie Kingdom	TV series (1 episode 'Drag Act' S4 E3)
1980	Life for Christine	Rose	TV film
1981	Bognor	Coriander Cordingley	TV series (6 episodes)
1981	ITV Playhouse	Angela Birley	TV series (1 episode: "Sin with Our Permission")
1981	Roger Doesn't Live Here Anymore	Rose	TV series (6 episodes)
1984	Bergerac	Fleur Ewell	TV series (1 episode: "House Guests")
1984	Oxbridge Blues	Eileen/Lizzie	TV series (2 episodes)
1985	Storyboard	Deidre Aitken	TV series (1 episode: "King & Castle")
1986	ScreenPlay	The Mozart Inquest	TV series
1991	The House of Elliot	Alice Burgoyne	TV series (11 episodes: 1991–1993)
1996	Frontiers	Diane Lightfoot	TV series
1997	Trial and Retribution	Meg Richards	TV series (2 episodes)
1999	Pure Wickedness	Detective Inspector Mary Carson	TV series
2000	A Likeness in Stone	Mrs Warner	TV film
2001	The Fourth Angel	Gail (Jack's Secretary)	
2002	The Jury	Emma McGlade	TV series
2005	Cherished	Justice Hallett	TV film
2006	The Living and the Dead	Nancy Brocklebank	
2006	The Best Man	Dr Cowley	TV film
2008	Defiance	Riva Reich	
2010	Silent Witness	Margaret Hudson	TV series (1 episode: "Intent: Part II")
2010	Archipelago	Patricia	
2011	The hour	Jemima Sherwin	BBC Series
2011	Happy Accident	Claire	Short
2013	Holby City	Mary Tinsley	BBC Series (Series 15 ?)
2014	Death in Paradise	Emma	Red Planet Series
2014	The Suspicions of Mr Whicher	Georgina Shore	Ep. Beyond the Pale
2017	Doctors	Ruth Hunter	
2018	Witless (Series 3)	Jane	Objective Prods
2019 (?)	The Show	Karen	Phoenix Films
2019 (?)	Don't Forget the Driver	Lyn	BBC series
2022	This England	Clare Edwards	Sky
2022	A Spy Among Friends	Dora Philby	ITV
2023	A Paris Proposal	Marion Durand	Hallmark TV film
2023	Casualty	Mags Pine	BBC
