= Evening Standard British Film Awards 2009 =

The 2009 Evening Standard British Film Awards, held on 1 February 2009, honoured the best British and Irish films of 2008.

== Best film ==
Hunger

- Frost/Nixon
- Unrelated

== Best Director ==
Stephen Daldry – The Reader

- Danny Boyle – Slumdog Millionaire
- Lenny Abrahamson – Garage

== Best Actor ==
Michael Sheen – Frost/Nixon / Pat Shortt – Garage (TIE)

- Michael Fassbender – Hunger

== Best Actress ==
Tilda Swinton – Julia

- Samantha Morton – Mister Lonely
- Kate Winslet – The Reader, Revolutionary Road

== Best Screenplay ==
Martin McDonagh – In Bruges

- Mark O’Halloran – Garage
- Peter Morgan – Frost/Nixon

== Technical achievement ==
Mark Digby (production designer) – Slumdog Millionaire

- Roger Deakins (cinematographer) – No Country for Old Men, In the Valley of Elah, The Reader (with Chris Menges)
- Joe Walker (editor) – Hunger, The Escapist

== Most Promising Newcomer ==
Joanna Hogg (director) – Unrelated

- Dev Patel (actor) – Slumdog Millionaire
- Rupert Wyatt (writer-director) – The Escapist

== Peter Sellers Award for Comedy ==
Sally Hawkins – Happy-Go-Lucky

- Eddie Marsan – Happy-Go-Lucky
- Chris Waitt – A Complete History of My Sexual Failures

== Alexander Walker Special Award ==
Mike Leigh
