= Jean-Baptiste de La Curne de Sainte-Palaye =

French academic (1697–1781)

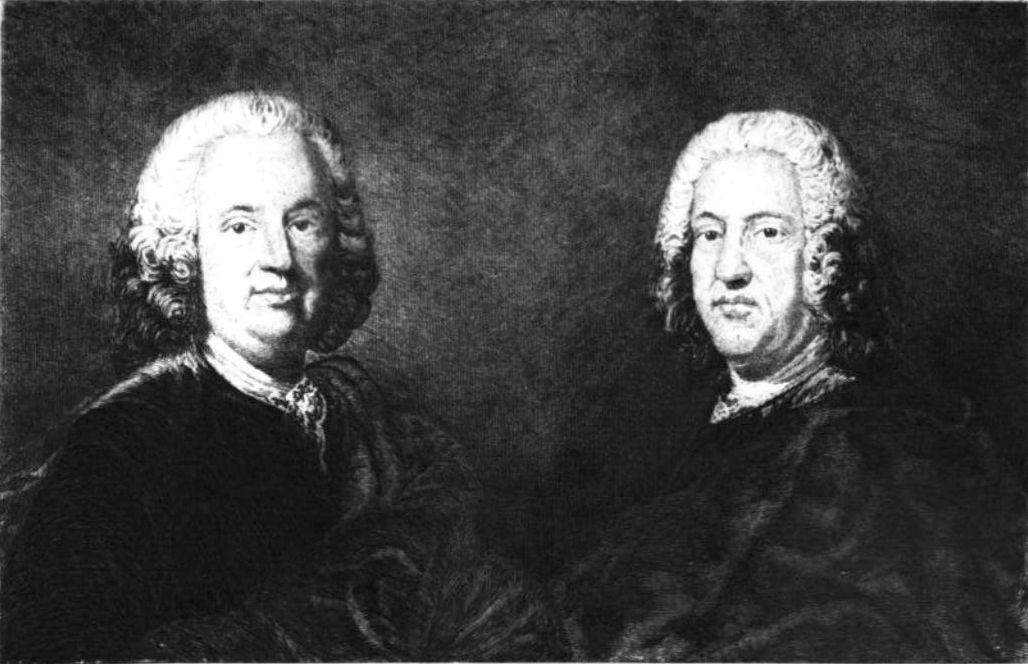
- La Curne de Sainte-Palaye and his twin
- Born: June 1697; Auxerre, France
- Died: 1 March 1781 (aged 83–84); Paris, France
- Occupation: Historian
- Notable work: Dictionnaire des antiquités françaises
- Title: Member, Académie française
- Term: 1758–1781

Jean-Baptiste de La Curne de Sainte-Palaye (June 1697 – 1 March 1781) was a French historian, classicist, philologist and lexicographer.

== Biography ==
From an ancient family, his father Edme had been gentleman of the bedchamber to the Duke of Orléans, brother of Louis XIV (a position Jean-Baptiste held for a time under the regent Orléans) and then receiver of the greniers à sel (salt granary tax, or gabelle) in Auxerre. La Curne de Sainte-Palaye's health was delicate and so he only began his classical studies aged 15, but he read with such enthusiasm and studied so successfully that his reputation alone (he had not yet published anything) got him elected as a member of the Académie des inscriptions et belles-lettres in 1724, aged only 27. That same year he took on a study of the medieval chroniclers, which led him to research into the origins of chivalry. He then spent one year (1725) at the court of king Stanislas I, in charge of the correspondence between this prince and the French court.

After his Polish stay he wrote a mémoire on two passages from Livy and Dionysius of Halicarnassus (1727) and numerous other memoirs on Roman history, before moving to work on French history. From then on he almost exclusively devoted himself to the study and recovery of manuscripts relating to the history of France's language and institutions. He began a series of studies on the chroniclers of the Middle Ages for the Historiens des Gaules et de la France (edited by Martin Bouquet), Raoul Glaber, Helgaud, the Gesta of Louis VII, the chronicle of Morigny, Rigord and his continuator, William le Breton, the monk of St. Denis, Jean de Venette, Froissart and the Jouvencel.

He made two journeys into Italy with his brother, the first in 1739–40, accompanied by their compatriot Charles de Brosses, who related many humorous anecdotes about the two brothers, particularly about Jean-Baptiste, whom he called "the bilious Sainte-Palaye!" On returning from this tour he saw one of Jean de Joinville's manuscripts at the house of the senator Fiorentini, well known in the history of the text of this pleasing memorialist. The manuscript was bought for the king in 1741 and is still at the Bibliothèque nationale. After the second journey (1749) Lacurne published a letter to de Brosses, on Le Goût dans les arts (1751). In this he showed that he was not only attracted by manuscripts, but that he could see and admire works of art. While there he also reported on 4,000 unpublished or little known sources, taught himself Provençal and formed his vast number of manuscripts into a collection of 23 folio volumes. He was interested in several literary deposits in France. Finally he gathered more than 4,000 summaries of manuscripts and copies of the most precious documents together.

His research on the chroniclers and romanciers led him to embark on a vast, three-pronged endeavor – to explain chivalry (adding a history of the troubadours as he went), to compose a dictionary of French antiquities, and to write a full glossary of variants of the French language. In 1758 La Curne de Sainte-Palaye was elected a member of the Académie française (he was also in the academies in Dijon and Nancy and a corresponding member of the Accademia della Crusca) and in 1759 he published the first edition of his Mémoires sur l'ancienne chevalerie, considérée comme un établissement politique et militaire, for which unfortunately he only used works of fiction and ancient stories as sources, neglecting the heroic poems which would have shown him the nobler aspects of an institution so soon corrupted by "courteous" manners; a second edition appeared at the time of his death (3 vols. 1781, 3rd ed. 1826). He prepared an edition of the works of Eustache Deschamps, which was never published, and also made a collection of more than a hundred volumes of extracts from early authors relating to French antiquities and the French language of the Middle Ages.

In 1756, Sainte-Palaye published his Projet d’un glossaire françois, a plan for constructing an historical glossary of Old French from the materials he had been so diligently collecting. Despite the assistance of Antoine Guiroy, Louis-Georges-Oudard Feudrix de Bréquigny, and Georges-Jean Mouchet over many years, his Glossaire françois remained unfinished at his death in 1781. A few years later, Mouchet finally began to publish the Glossaire françois, but the French Revolution interrupted before the 1st volume was completely printed. Further decades passed before Léopold Favre at last assembled the manuscripts prepared by Saint-Palaye, Guiroy, Bréquigny, and Mouchet for publication as the Dictionnaire historique de l’ancien langage françois in 1875. No further editions have appeared.

In 1764 a collection of his manuscripts was bought by the government and after his death were placed in the king's library; they are still there (in the fonds Moreau), with the exception of some which were given to the marquess of Paulmy in exchange, and were later placed in the Bibliothèque de l'Arsenal. Lacurne de Sainte-Palaye ceased work about 1771; the death of his twin brother was greatly felt by him, he suffered dementia, and died on 1 March 1781.

== Critical reception ==
His life was written for this Académie by Chamfort and for the Académie des Inscriptions by Dupuy; both works have no value. See, however, the biography of Lacurne, with a list of his published works and those in manuscript, at the beginning of the tenth and last volume of the Dictionnaire historique de l'ancien langage françoise, ou glossaire de la langue françoise depuis son origine jusqu'au sieclé de Louis XIV, published by Louis Favre (1875–1882). See also Lionel Gossman's book, Medievalism and the ideologies of the Enlightenment: the world and work of La Curne de Sainte-Palaye (Johns Hopkins Press, Baltimore, 1968).

== Works and collections ==
His most notable work is the Dictionnaire des antiquités françaises, no less than 40 folio volumes. This work, acquired by M. Moreau, is now in the Bibliothèque nationale, and its dimensions preclude its being published. Some of his other publications include:

- Letter to M. de Bachaumont on good taste in the arts and letters (1751), in-12;
- an edition of a fable, les Amours du bon vieux temps, Aucassin et Nicolette (Vaucluse [Paris], 1756, in-12);
- Mémoires sur l'ancienne chevalerie, chevalerie considérée comme un établissement politique et militaire;
- a series of Mémoires, inserted into the publication of the Académie des inscriptions et belles-lettres (t. VII, X, XIII, XIV, XV, XVII, XX, XXIV).

He also left about a hundred folio volumes of manuscripts, now split between the Bibliothèque nationale and the Bibliothèque de l'Arsenal, with the latter containing the materials for a Glossaire français, including the self-published Projet (1756, in-4°) and a description of the execution of Georges-Jean Mouchet: only the first volume of this important ten to twelve volume work was printed during his lifetime, with the final one published in 1875.

- Letter to M. de Bachaumont on good taste in arts and letters (1751), in-12

== Sources ==
- Gustave Vapereau, Dictionnaire universel des littératures, Paris, Hachette, 1876, p. 1809
