= Sheila Kelley =

Sheila Kelley may refer to:

- Sheila Kelley (American actress), American television actress, played Gwen Taylor in L.A. Law
- Sheila Kelley (British actress), British television actress
