= Simon Rumley =

British film director and screenwriter

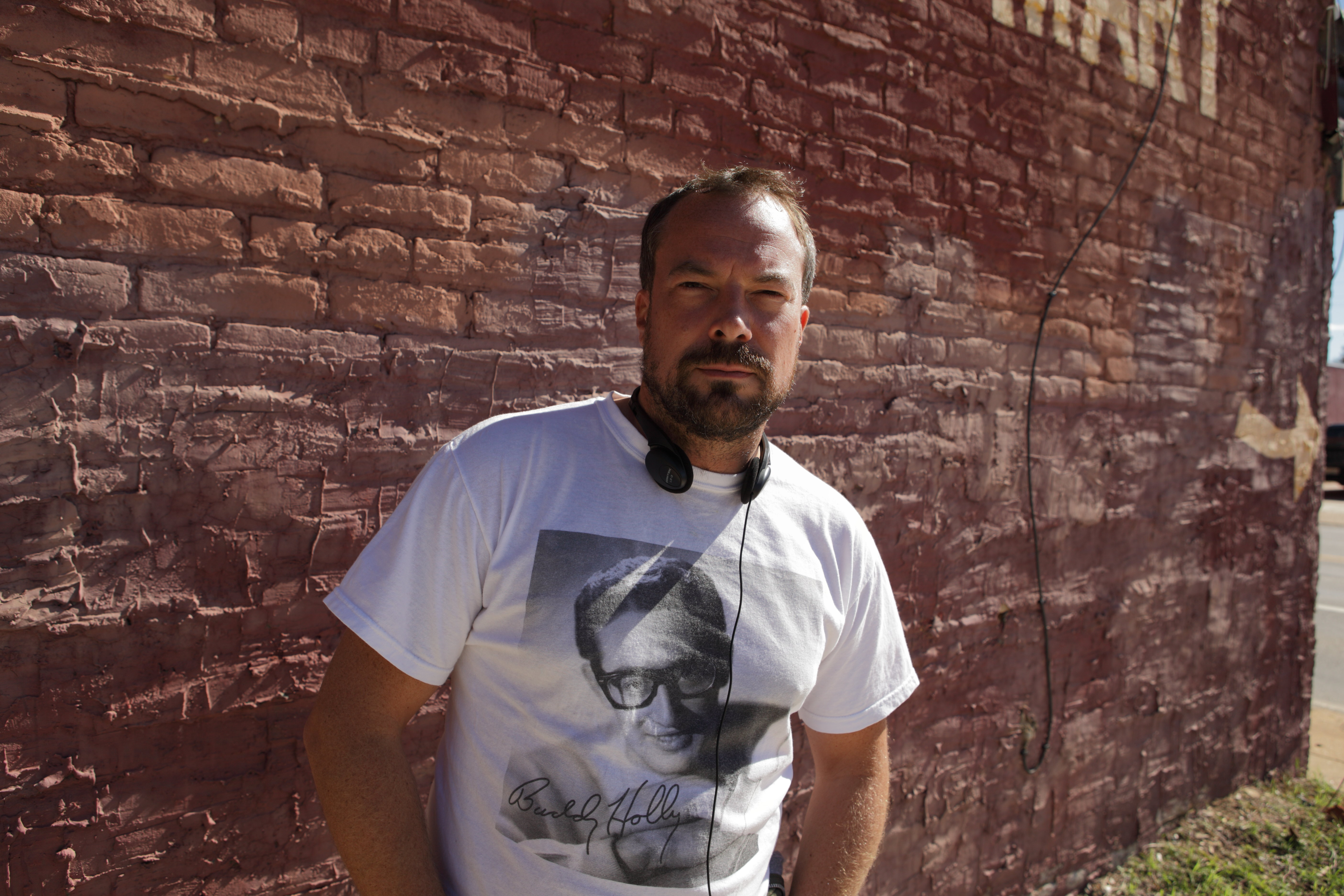
Simon Rumley on the set of The Last Word

Simon Rumley (born 22 May 1968) is a British screenwriter, director and author. Mostly associated with the horror genre, he was described by Screen International as "one of the great British cinematic outsiders, a gifted director with the know-how to puncture the conventions". He has won several awards and worked with, among others, Roger Lloyd-Pack, Greta Scacchi, Noah Taylor and Peter Facinelli.

== Career ==
After starting out as a runner, Rumley began writing short and feature scripts, including Club Le Monde, after which he was invited onto the Carlton Television Writing Course. After writing and directing four short films including 'Laughter' which was nominated for a 'Dick Award' at London's ICA, Rumley wrote, produced and directed Strong Language, which was picked up by the company Stranger Than Fiction. Seen as a promising young film maker, he was invited to Austria by the European Film Academy and in 1999 wrote, produced and directed The Truth Game. Both this and Strong Language, were released through the BFI at London's National Film Theatre, both films being noted for their 'intensity and a quest for emotional honesty'

2002's Club Le Monde was released through UGC Cinemas and in 2004 he directed the short film The Handyman in Vermont, USA, starring Greta Scacchi and Bill Sage. The Handyman played several festivals worldwide and won the Best Short Film at Sitges Film Festival in 2006.

During this period, Rumley's parents died within a short space of each other and, having watched his mother suffer from cancer, Rumley began writing a script provisionally titled The Living in the Home of the Dead, a psychological horror-tragedy. The script was picked up by Nick O'Hagan (Pandaemonium, Young Adam) and after being reworked and retitled The Living and the Dead, it was filmed during 2005 at Lord Cardigan's Savernake Estate starring Roger Lloyd-Pack. Executive produced by Elliot Grove, the founder of Raindance, it premiered at the Rotterdam International Film Festival and played over 40 festivals worldwide. Described in Variety as "Near brilliant", it went on to win almost twenty-five awards including 'Best Film' and 'Best Director', 'Best Actor', 'Best Make-Up' and 'Best Supporting Actress' at Austin's Fantasticfest.

In 2008, Rumley wrote the first draft of the screenplay that would become Red White & Blue. Filmed the following year, it starred Noah Taylor, Marc Senter and Amanda Fuller. Premiered in Rotterdam in 2010, it was described as 'exploring the darker side of humanity with bone-chilling results'. It had its American premiere at the SXSW Festival in Austin, Texas and went on to win Best Film Awards at several festivals including the Boston Underground Film Festival, Lund International Fantastic Film Festival, Fantaspoa Fantastic Film Festival in Brazil and best foreign film/Sequence Award at North America's Fantasia Film Festival in Montreal.

Straight after finishing Red White & Blue, Rumley shot the critically lauded and final segment of the seminal British psycho-sexual horror anthology, Little Deaths. Rumley's 'Bitch' starred Tom Sawyer and Kate Braithwaite. The film also featured a performance from the Shoreditch band S.C.U.M, whose lead singer, Tom Cohen, married the late Peaches Geldof. Little Deaths had its world premiere in February 2011, opening Frightfest in Glasgow and then premiering in North America at SXSW.

That same year, Rumley was invited to make a short film for The ABCs of Death, produced by Tim League (executive producer of Red White & Blue) and Ant Timpson. Deciding to shoot in a country he had never visited before, Rumley and his longtime Director of Photography, Milton Kam, went to Kam's country of birth, Suriname, and shot P for Paramaribo, which would ultimately become P for Pressure. Featuring a who's who of independent horror names such as Nacho Vigalondo, Ti West, Adam Wingard, Srdjan Spasojevic and Xavier Gens, the film premiered at Toronto's International Film Festival's Midnight Madness section in 2012.

In 2013, Rumley was hired to direct his first 'Hollywood' feature by Boss Media and producer Frank Mancuso, Jr (Species, Ronin, Internal Affairs). The film was co-produced by Ai7le Films, run by actor Peter Facinelli (Twilight). The Last Word is a horror/curse movie based on the true story of Johnny Frank Garrett, executed in Texas in 1992 for the rape and murder of a 76-year-old nun. Garrett maintained his innocence until the end and left behind a curse in the form of a letter. It stated that his spirit would cause the deaths of all who helped execute him. Soon after, many of those people met mysterious deaths.

Crowhurst is based on the tragic real-life story of amateur sailor Donald Crowhurst, a 35-year-old father of four, who set out from England in 1968, joining an international race to be the first or the fastest man to circumnavigate the globe single-handed and non-stop. But his dream quickly turned into a nightmare, ending in insanity and probable suicide. The executive producer of the film was Nicolas Roeg, who had himself attempted to film the story in the 1970s.

== Films (as writer/director/producer) ==
- 1994 Phew (short)
- 2000 Strong Language
- 2001 The Truth Game
- 2002 Club Le Monde
- 2006 The Handyman (short)
- 2006 The Living and the Dead
- 2010 Red White & Blue
- 2011 60 Seconds of Solitude in Year Zero (short)
- 2011 Little Deaths (segment "Bitch")
- 2012 The ABCs of Death (segment "P Is for Pressure")
- 2014 The Last Word
- 2015 Crowhurst
- 2016 Fashionista
- 2016 Johnny Frank Garrett's Last Word
- 2017 Once Upon a Time in London
