= Chris Baker =

Chris Baker may refer to

- Chris Baker (artist) (born 1960), British science fiction artist
- Chris Baker (defensive lineman) (born 1987), American football defensive lineman
- Chris Baker (golfer) (born 1986), American professional golfer
- Chris Baker (high jumper) (born 1991), British high jumper
- Chris Baker (politician) (1958–2023), Australian politician
- Chris Baker (racing driver) (born 1969), American race car driver
- Chris Baker (talk radio host), American comedian and radio talk show host
- Chris Baker (tight end) (born 1979), former American football tight end
- Chris Baker (writer) (born 1948), Thailand-based British writer

== See also ==
- Christopher Baker (disambiguation)
- Chris Barker (disambiguation)
