= Adam Roberts (film maker) =

Adam Roberts is a British writer, filmmaker, curator, and film programmer born in 1959, in Bogota, Colombia. He is best known as the co-founder, with film-maker Joanna Hogg, of the film programming collective A Nos Amours, which has organised screenings, retrospectives, and discussions dedicated to historically significant and under-screened films.

== Career ==
=== Curation – A Nos Amours ===
In 2011, Roberts co-founded the film programming collective A Nos Amours with filmmaker Joanna Hogg. The project began with a screening of Maurice Pialat's 1983 film À Nos Amours in a pop-up venue. A Nos Amours (the naming of this curation project was inspired by Pilat's film) went on to present numerous screenings, lectures, conferences, art exhibitions, and film events in the United Kingdom.

A Nos Amours was founded with the aim of promoting overlooked or rarely screened works of cinema, with always passionate advocacy, in the belief that that cinema should be above all a shared experience. A Nos Amours also aimed to explore the gray area between cinema auditorium and the gallery space. Events organised by A Nos Amours have included lectures, seminars, and conferences, featuring filmmakers, writers, academics and critics, such as Laura Mulvey, Carol Morley, Will Self, Geoff Dyer, Deborah Levy, Terry Gilliam, and Richard Ayoade.

From 2013 to 2015, A Nos Amours, led by Roberts and Hogg, presented an exhaustive retrospective devoted to the work of Belgian filmmaker Chantal Akerman. The project included screenings at the Institute of Contemporary Arts in London, a national touring programme, as well as an exhibition of Akerman's moving image art, curated by Roberts, Hogg and Michael Maizière, at Ambika P3 Gallery in London. A Nos Amours published the 'Chantal Akerman Retrospective Handbook' in 2019, which includes all that was written by Roberts in relation to the retrospective. The book has been reviewed.

=== Film-making ===
Since 1991 Adam Roberts has made films and videos. His film Mickey Finn won the Grand Prix du Jury at Angers international Film Festival in 1992, when the jury included Chantal Akerman. His work has since been seen in film festivals, art galleries, and on television around the world. He has made dance films, narrative films, and experimental videos. Funders have included Arts Council England, the National Lottery, British Film Institute, BBC, Channel4 and France 2.

Noted collaborators have included film maker Jack Hazan, choreographer Jonathan Burrows, composers Kevin Volans & Matteo Fargion, and the dancer Sylvie Guillem.

Many of Roberts' films are in the collection of the BFI National Archive.

His films Remake and Stiletto have been published on DVD by Filmarmalade.

Between 2015 and 2017, Roberts, working in collaboration with Paul Coleman, filmed more than 100 interviews with long-term British survivors of HIV, a project known as The AIDS Since the 80s Project, now permanently housed in the London Archives (formerly the London Metropolitan Archives), indexed and catalogued with support from the Wellcome Foundation.

=== Published writing ===
Aside for the Chantal Akerman Retrospective Handbook, Roberts' published writing include chapters and journal papers, and the book Lamentation—In the Stuart Croft Archive, published by Ma Bibliothèque in 2020.

Chapters and journal articles include:

- What Does a Dance Filmmaker See? in Cinematic Intermediality, edited by Kim Knowles, Marion Schmid, Edinburgh University Press 2021
- Akerman the scavenger, in MIRAJ: The Moving Image Review & Art Journal. 8 (1–2)
- Akerman's Tree, in Speaking to Le Passeur (The Ferryman) 1881, William Stott of Oldham
- Notes on filming dance, in The International Journal of Screen Dance, Volume 2 (2012)
- Like a Musical Piece: Akerman and Musicality in Chantal Akerman: Afterlives, ed. by Marion Schmid and Emma Wilson, Moving Image, 9, Cambridge: Legenda, 2019
- Farewell, An homage to Chantal Akerman (1950–2015), Frieze Magazine, issue 176, December 2015

other:

- Guest speaker on BBC Screenshot, with Mark Kermode, extended interview about Chantal Akerman's Jeanne Dielman, 23 quai de Commerce 1080 Bruxelles
