= A Nos Amours (film collective) =

English film collective established in 2011

A Nos Amours is a film collective founded in 2011 by Joanna Hogg and Adam Roberts, in London. A Nos Amours has organised and presented more than 40 film screenings and events, including a complete retrospective of the films of Chantal Akerman, and published the Chantal Akerman Retrospective Handbook. A Nos Amours has also organised talks, conferences and an art exhibition.

== History ==
The first screening was given in a pop-up space, in a disused and unheated shop in a cold London winter of 2011. The film screened was Maurice Pialat's Á Nos Amours. The film (which translates as To Our Loves) provided a name for the project.

Their most substantial project has been a retrospective of the films and videos of the Belgian film-maker Chantal Akerman, presented in London and across the UK, with Akerman's participation in person at a number of the events. The retrospective was spread across two years, beginning on 26 November 2013, and concluding on 30 October 2015, with the films presented chronologically. The retrospective was comprehensive, including all of Akerman's films, for cinema and for TV. No other retrospective has been able to do this, before or since. 22 of the films were translated and subtitled into English for the first time.

A mid-retrospective symposium was attended by Akerman, participating in an extended Q&A and audience discussion.

The final film in the retrospective however was tragically a posthumous screening, the UK premiere of No Home Movie, Akerman's last completed film, shown in London's Regent Street Cinema in the presence of Akerman's family and friends.

The retrospective has been credited, for example by Laura Mulvey in an article in Sight and Sound, with doing much to raise the profile and understanding of Akerman's work, and so, according to Mulvey, a likely factor in the selection of Akerman's feature film Jeanne Dielman, 23 quai de Commerce, 1080 Bruxelles being voted Greatest Film of All Time in 2022 by critics and film-makers in BFI Sight & Sound's once-a-decade survey - which had previously been won by Orson Welles' Citizen Kane and Alfred Hitchcock's Vertigo.

=== Policies ===
A Nos Amours never settled in any one place, because A Nos Amours believed that cinema is produced by the moment of encounter with the audience, and the audience matters more than the venue.

Venues have included unheated vacant commercial premises, the largest Xtreme screen at Vue Westfield in Stratford, London, small community screens such as the Lexi, in Kensal Rise, or London's Close Up Cinema. Other regular venues have included ICA Cinema, Curzon cinemas and Ciné Lumière at the Institut français du Royaume-Uni.

A Nos Amours have toured film prints across the UK, such as for a series of screenings of a 35mm print of Bela Tarr's eight-hour film Sátántangó, in partnership with Scalarama.

== Partnership and collaboration ==
A Nos Amours has collaborated with many other organisations, notably with Contemporary Films to release nationally Chantal Akerman's last film, No Home Movie, and Ambika P3 Gallery.

Screenings around the UK have been undertaken in collaboration with cinema chains, such as for a one-day only national release of Chantal Akerman's Je Tu Il Elle, in partnership with Picturehouse Cinemas and CAA Glasgow on 17 March 2015.

== Introductions and contextualisation ==
Screenings have invariably been introduced by those with specialist knowledge, such as artists, critics and scholars, or else those with extraordinary understanding or passionate interest. Some speakers had never before spoken in public. Volunteers were encouraged to present in this way and to programme work of their own.

Notable speakers have included Jacques Rancière, Laura Mulvey, Carol Morley, Will Self, Geoff Dyer, Deborah Levy, Olaf Möller, Julie Myerson, George Szirtes, Marina Warner, Gus Casely-Heyford, Terry Gilliam and Richard Ayoade.

=== Film formats ===
Films have wherever possible been shown in their original format. Most screenings have been from 35mm prints or 16mm, though some have been shown digitally or from tape sources. Live cued subtitles have at times of necessity been projected onto the film image because no subtitled copy could be located. An example of flexibility of approach was a screening at the ICA Cinema on 30 May 2013, of Frost by Fred Kelemen, filmed in 1997, but which was still incomplete for legal reasons. Consequently, the director's own work copy, on 16mm film, was screened. The projector was placed in the auditorium so that the sound of the projector was audible, a decision intended to underline the provisional condition of the film.

=== Hand-outs and supporting text ===
At screenings, the audience has invariably been offered printed handouts, providing full credits and text either composed by A Nos Amours, or else extracting useful writing about the film on offer. The hand-outs provided for the Chantal Akerman retrospective screenings have been published in the Chantal Akerman Retrospective Handbook.

=== Screenings ===
A Nos Amours has presented 59 screenings and events, as listed on the A Nos Amours website. Screenings have explored the film work of canonical figures such as Peter Watkins, Andrei Tarkovsky, Robert Bresson, or have unearthed largely unseen films such as Straub & Huillets's 1968 film Chronik der Anna Magdalena Bach (The Chronicle of Anna Magdalena Bach), Fred Kelemen's Frost, festival successes such as Véréna Paravel and Lucien Castaing-Taylor's Leviathan (2012), or classic but relatively unseen films such as Sergei Bondarchuk's 6.5 hour long 1965 film Voyna i mir (War and Peace).

== Chantal Akerman complete retrospective ==
Between 2013 and 2015 A Nos Amours presented in London a complete retrospective of the films of the celebrated film-maker Chantal Akerman. This was a complex and demanding project as rights and screening copies turned out to be widely scattered and difficult to access. The research needed to present this retrospective has been published in book form so that others might easily follow suit. The research, documentation, translations and subtitles, with copies of missing films, were donated to the Fondation Chantal Akerman upon its formation in 2017.

=== After Chantal: An International Conference ===
An academic conference, hosted by The Centre for Research and Education in Arts and Media.

==== Exhibition ====
===== Chantal Akerman NOW =====
Adam Roberts, Joanna Hogg, and Michael Maizière, curated a large scale exhibition at Ambika P3 Gallery of Chantal Akerman's installation work. The exhibition opened on 30 October 2015, and closed on 6 December 2015. The exhibition was presented in association with Marion Goodman Gallery, with funding support from Arts Council England, A Nos Amours, and University of Westminster).

The show was reviewed widely.

Adrian Serale also selected the exhibition as one of his 10 Best Art Shows of 2015.

== Publication ==
=== Chantal Akerman Retrospective Handbook ===
A book published by A Nos Amours in 2011 gathering up all the research and writing that went into mounting the Chantal Akerman complete retrospective. Included are the texts, journalism and blogging that were offered to the audience as a means to engage them with film-works that were, at time and for the most part, unknown. The book shared uniquely accurate and reliable information about the films, a resource and source book that has been reprinted several times.

Included in the book are selected writings from noted authorities such as Raymond Bellour, Richard Brody, Ivone Margulies, Marion Schmid and Ginette Vincendeau.

Laura Mulvey provided the expansive foreword, surveying Akerman's achievement, urging the use of the book as an aide-mémoire for what stands as one of the most astonishing bodies of work in all cinema:

"As a collage of writing of many different kinds, the Handbook crucially bears witness to the effect that Akerman has had on the film community, from her earliest movies until her last... The high quality of the texts included in the book are all a reminder of the way that her 'cinematic' qualities have advanced our understanding of film." (Laura Mulvey, Foreword, Chantal Akerman Retrospective Handbook, London 2019, p15)

The book has been reviewed:

- Film International, 29 July 2020: Portrait of a Singular Artist – Chantal Akerman Retrospective Handbook by Joanna Hogg and Adam Roberts
- Times Literary Supplement (TLS), 6 March 2020: In Brief Review: A Nos Amours
- Cineaste Magazine Vol. XLVI, No 1 (Winter 2020 edition): Chantal Akerman Retrospective Handbook
