= Creature (2011 film) =

2011 American monster film

- Theatrical release poster
- Directed by: Fred M. Andrews
- Written by: Fred M. Andrews; Tracy Morse
- Produced by: Sidney Sheinberg; Jonathan Sheinberg; Bill Shineberg
- Starring: Sid Haig; Mehcad Brooks; Serinda Swan; Amanda Fuller
- Cinematography: Christopher Faloona
- Edited by: Chris Conlee
- Music by: Kevin Haskins
- Production company: The Bubble Factory
- Distributed by: ARC Entertainment
- Release date: September 9, 2011
- Running time: 93 minutes
- Country: United States
- Language: English
- Budget: $3 million
- Box office: $533,235

Creature is a 2011 American monster horror comedy film directed by Fred M. Andrews, based on a screenplay written by Andrews and Tracy Morse. The film is set in a Louisiana Bayou, where a group of friends discover a local legend and are in a fight for their survival. The film opened in theaters on September 9, 2011, in the United States and Canada. It stars Mehcad Brooks, Serinda Swan, Amanda Fuller, Dillon Casey, Lauren Schneider, Aaron Hill, Daniel Bernhardt, and Sid Haig.

== Plot ==
A group of friends – siblings Oscar and Karen, Beth and her marine infantry boyfriend Randy, and Randy's sister Emily and her ex-Navy SEAL boyfriend Niles – are traveling through the backwoods town of Fort Collins, Louisiana. While stopping at a gas stationed owned by Chopper, Oscar discovers a shrine to a local legend, Lockjaw. The townies give the boys directions to a house built by Grimley, a local tourist attraction and urban legend. Oscar and Karen convince the group to join them.

En route, Oscar tells them all the legend of Lockjaw: A long time ago, Grimley Boutine and his sister Caroline were the last two remaining members of their clan. The two were in an incestuous relationship, and Caroline was pregnant with her brother's child. The day before their wedding, an albino alligator dragged Caroline off into the swamp. Grimley sought out the gator in the hopes that he would find her alive, but instead he came across her in a cave being devoured by the gator. Going insane with rage, Grimley killed the gator with his bare hands, before eating its flesh, then consuming the flesh of his sister, along with every other piece of flesh in the cave, slowly devolving, becoming half-man, half-alligator himself. The others do not believe his story.

They arrive at Grimley's house, unaware that they are being watched. They set up camp for the night near the Grimley house for an evening of drinking and having fun. Meanwhile, one of the shop patrons, Grover, is slaughtered by an unseen beast on the riverbank after ignoring warnings to not defy Grimley. Randy leaves the group to get more beer from the truck, returning just in time to interrupt Karen from having sex with a drunken Beth. Oscar, however, secretly takes photos of Niles and Emily having sex while masturbating. Karen finds him and begins stroking and kissing him, as they are secretly also committing incest. Oscar climaxes early, and the frustrated Karen walks off and before being knocked unconscious by Chopper, who approaches Oscar; Oscar and Karen are Chopper's children. Subservient to Lockjaw, Chopper takes Karen away. Randy witnesses this and sees Lockjaw before running off into the woods. Oscar collapses on Emily and Niles, claiming that Randy had attacked him; Niles leaves Emily to treat Oscar's shock as he goes off in search of Randy. Randy and Niles both encounter Lockjaw and run, coming across a highway that they had supposedly gotten far off track from earlier; they return to look for Emily, only to be stopped by one of the shop workers who holds them at gunpoint. Niles is able to kill him, but Lockjaw gruesomely murders Randy.

Beth awakens to her tent moved to a dark cave, and she screams upon seeing Lockjaw feast at a victim. Karen, having been set up as a sacrifice to Lockjaw, has her feet cut off by her father to lure Lockjaw from the underground, saying that it must be done for the family. After he leaves, Lockjaw emerges from the cavern below the shack and seems to recognize her by the necklace Chopper put around her neck, the same one that belonged to his sister. Niles finds Karen dead when he comes across the cabin, and is attacked by a disillusioned Oscar but quickly dispatches him with Oscar's machete. Afterwards, he sneaks into Lockjaw's cave to save Emily, but they are both captured by the cult, with Lockjaw throwing Niles into the river. Chopper tells Emily that Lockjaw has chosen her to become his next bride. Niles follows the party to a gathering ritual that will allow Grimley to impregnate Emily. During the ceremony, Niles fights Lockjaw and manages to knock him into a sinkhole. He unties Emily but Lockjaw pulls Emily into the hole, with Niles following. The next morning, Emily and Niles emerge from the sinkhole with Lockjaw's jaw, and drive off.

Some time later, Chopper arrives at the refurbished Grimley cabin, where a celebration with the cult is occurring. Beth is revealed to be alive, with a mutated baby.

== Cast ==
- Mehcad Brooks as Niles, an ex–Navy SEAL who left the military to be with Emily.
- Serinda Swan as Emily, Niles' girlfriend.
- Dillon Casey as Oscar, Chopper's son and Karen's brother.
- Lauren Schneider as Karen, Oscar's sister and Chopper's daughter.
- Amanda Fuller as Beth, Randy's girlfriend.
- Aaron Hill as Randy, Emily's brother, a US Marine.
- Pruitt Taylor Vince as Grover
- Daniel Bernhardt as Grimley / Lockjaw, a man turned ravenous half-alligator beast who feeds on human flesh.
- Sid Haig as Chopper, the leader of Lockjaw's cult and patriarch to his clan.
- Jennifer Lynn Warren as Ophelia

== Production ==
Creature was initially going to be a graphic novel named Lockjaw. Paul Mason, an executive producer, suggested to Andrews that it might be better done as a film. Andrews, who had worked as a production designer, agreed to direct. The film's incest themes were influenced by H. P. Lovecraft's Cthulhu Mythos, in which rural, inbred cults worshiped inhuman creatures. More background on the creature was in the original script, but it did not make it into the film. The creature, which in the early stages was a serial killer in a slasher film, was eventually converted into more of a mutant.

== Release ==
=== Box office ===
Creature was released theatrically in the United States on September 9, 2011. The film grossed $327,000 from 1,507 venues on its opening weekend, making it the second lowest grossing first weekend ever for a film appearing on 1,500+ screens, and the third worst per location average ever. It ended its run with a domestic gross of $508,714.

=== Home media ===
The film was released on DVD on September 11, 2012, in the United States and Canada by Anderson Merchandisers, Lp and Phase 4 Films respectively.

== Reception ==
Critical reception for the film has been overwhelmingly negative. Rotten Tomatoes, a review aggregator, reports that 10% of 29 surveyed critics gave the film a positive review; the average rating is 2.86/10. Scott Foy of Dread Central panned the film awarding it a score of 1/5 stars and called it unworthy of wide release. Neil Genzlinger from The New York Times gave the film a negative review stating in his review on the film, "The six actors in the central, edible roles seem as if they could have pulled off a Scream-like satire, but since they weren’t asked to, there’s nothing much for them to do but follow the clearly visible paths to their doom. Not all are doomed, of course — film tradition demands some survivors — but the climactic scene, which seems to draw on mud wrestling for inspiration, is so silly that perhaps those who do make it through this swampy ordeal wish they hadn't". Corey Hall from Metro Times panned the film, concluding, "Creature is so laughably pathetic that it's worth a few chuckles, but the really amazing thing is that huckster Sid Sheinberg put up the cash to dump this slime-covered turd into more than 1,500 theaters nationwide, proving that hope, like evil swamp monsters, is eternal". Mark Olsen of the Los Angeles Times called it a "delightfully dopey" film that "has no illusions about what it is: a down-and-dirty, breasts-and-blood, creature-horror exploitation picture".
