= Club Le Monde =

2002 film directed by Simon Rumley

Club le Monde is an independent film released in 2002 and directed by Simon Rumley. It is set in 1993 and tells the story of one Saturday night in a small London nightclub. It stars Allison McKenzie, Dawn Steele and Annette Badland.
