= Unrelated =

- Promotional poster
- Directed by: Joanna Hogg
- Written by: Joanna Hogg
- Produced by: Barbara Stone
- Starring: Kathryn Worth; Tom Hiddleston; Mary Roscoe; David Rintoul; Emma Hiddleston; Henry Lloyd-Hughes; Harry Kershaw; Michael Hadley
- Cinematography: Oliver Curtis
- Edited by: Helle Le Fevre
- Distributed by: New Wave Films
- Release dates: October 2007 (London Film Festival); 11 March 2008
- Running time: 100 minutes
- Country: United Kingdom
- Language: English
- Budget: £150,000

Unrelated is a 2007 British drama film written and directed by Joanna Hogg, starring Kathryn Worth, Tom Hiddleston (in his feature film debut), Mary Roscoe, David Rintoul and Henry Lloyd-Hughes. It was released in the US on 20 February 2008.

== Plot ==
Anna arrives in Tuscany to stay with her old school friend Verena and her family in their rented villa in San Fabiano. She was meant to be accompanied by her boyfriend, Alex, but tells Verena that he had to stay in London at the last minute to work. Later, it becomes apparent that Alex refused to come at the last minute, following an argument. The group is split effectively between the adults: Verena, her new husband Charlie, and Verena's cousin George; and the teenagers: Verena's children, Jack and Badge, Charlie's son, Archie, and George's son, Oakley. Trying to escape her relationship worries, Anna spends increasingly more time with the teenagers, upsetting Verena. She joins in with their mild hedonism, even promising not to tell their parents about their marijuana smoking and a drug and drink-fuelled accident in a borrowed car.

Awkward sexual tension and flirtation between Anna and Oakley, the most self-confident of the 'youngs', comes to an awkward non-conclusion when she invites him to spend the night but he turns her down. Subsequently, Anna allows herself to grow apart from the teenagers and eventually tells Verena about the accident. The teenagers get into trouble and an argument between Oakley and his father turns physical. When Anna apologizes to Oakley for not telling him earlier, he tells her he has nothing to say to her: the teenagers also reject her. No longer fitting in with either age group, Anna leaves and checks into a hotel. Verena seeks her out and they reconcile after Anna reveals she has recently had to confront the reality that she will never bear a child. She returns to the villa, is reconciled with the teenagers, and stays on for a few hours after the others leave. In the final scene, we see Anna in a taxi to the airport on the phone to Alex, seemingly looking forward to seeing him again.

== Cast ==
- Kathryn Worth as Anna
- Tom Hiddleston as Oakley
- Mary Roscoe as Verena
- David Rintoul as George
- Emma Hiddleston as Badge
- Henry Lloyd-Hughes as Jack
- Harry Kershaw as Archie
- Michael Hadley as Charlie

Several people who lived and worked on the estate where filming took place also appeared in the film and are credited as themselves.

== Production ==
The film was shot on location in Italy. The cast lived in the house that the characters rent on the San Fabiano Estate, even sleeping in the bedrooms used in the film.

As the film was on a small budget, the production had to source costumes and props from what they already had. "We didn't have a huge budget where we could have an Edith Head approach and have everything especially designed for the film. It's finding what's there already. Doing that is always very interesting. One uncovers some nice stories and nice details." The dress that Anna wears, which is prominent throughout the film, originally belonged to Kathryn Worth's mother.

== Reception ==
=== Critical response ===
Unrelated has an approval rating of 89% on review aggregator website Rotten Tomatoes, based on 19 reviews, and an average rating of 6.9/10. The site's critics consensus reads: "An emotional and astutely accomplished feature debut from TV director Joanna Hogg, with strong performances and impressive direction throughout." Metacritic assigned the film a weighted average score of 74 out of 100, based on 9 critics, indicating "generally favorable reviews".

On its release in September 2008 it was hailed as one of the most original British films of the year. Critics remarked on its 'un-British' style and atmosphere, drawing comparisons to Ozu, Rohmer and Chabrol. Writing in The Sunday Times, Bryan Appleyard called it 'radical' for portraying a group of British middle class characters "simply as another tribe, one with its own customs, failings, virtues and, above all, human, all too human, anguish...In terms both of style and content, this is a radical and brilliant film that will, if there is any justice, come to be seen as a turning point for British cinema". In their December 2009 list of the 'Top 100 Films of The Decade', the film critics of The Guardian newspaper put Unrelated at number 21, the highest British film in the list.

=== Awards and nominations ===
Unrelated premiered at the London Film Festival in 2007, where it won the FIPRESCI International Critics Prize.

- London Film Festival 2007 FIPRESCI International Critics Prize
- The Guardian First Film Award 2008
- Bursa International Silk Road Film Festival 2008 Best International Actress, Kathryn Worth
- Chlotrudis Awards 2015, Best Supporting Actor, Tom Hiddleston
- Evening Standard British Film Awards 2009
  - Best Film 2009 (nominated)
  - Most Promising Newcomer Award 2009 (Joanna Hogg)
- London Film Critics Circle Awards Breakthrough Film Maker Award (Joanna Hogg, nominated)
