= The Living and the Dead (2006 film) =

- Directed by: Simon Rumley
- Written by: Simon Rumley
- Produced by: Nick O'Hagan; Simon Rumley
- Starring: Leo Bill; Kate Fahy; Roger Lloyd-Pack
- Cinematography: Milton Kam
- Edited by: Benjamin Putland
- Music by: Richard Chester
- Production company: Giant Films
- Release date: 2006
- Running time: 83 minutes
- Country: United Kingdom
- Language: English

The Living and the Dead is a 2006 British drama film written and directed by Simon Rumley, starring Leo Bill, Kate Fahy and Roger Lloyd-Pack.

== Plot ==
Donald Brocklebank is a man of aristocratic background living in fear of bankruptcy in a country manor house. His wife, Nancy, is terminally ill and requires constant care, as does his schizophrenic son James.

When Donald leaves the two alone in a bid to solve their almost definite financial collapse, James's condition begins to worsen. He believes he is able to look after his sick mother rather than nurse Mary who was sent by Donald. He neglects taking his prescribed medicine and locks the nurse out of the house, leaving his mother with nothing to do but weep. James, believing that more medicine will make you better faster than the prescribed amount, force feeds his mother large quantities of her pills, nearly killing her.

Eventually, police make their way into the house, relieving Nancy of her son's care. Due to the medication overdose she has an emergency operation which seems to cure her of her ailments. James then goes on to begin hallucinating from not taking his medication, while Nancy recovers from her illness. In a fit of rage, James stabs his mother to death, before stabbing and wounding his father. Shortly before Nancy's funeral, Donald passionately supports his son, provoking hostility from the rest of the family. At the funeral, James believes he has seen his mother and rushes over to hug her. In James' eyes, she then stabs her son several times, though everyone else sees James taking the knife he killed his mother with into his own stomach.

The film ends with Donald apparently bearing the same condition as his son, being cared for in his own home. He stabs one of the nurses and is taken away.

== Cast ==
- Leo Bill as James Brocklebank
- Roger Lloyd-Pack as Donald Brocklebank (as Roger Lloyd Pack)
- Kate Fahy as Nancy Brocklebank
- Sarah Ball as Nurse Mary
- Neil Conrich as Policeman
- Richard Wills-Cotton as nurse Mike
- Alan Perrin as Nurse Bob
- Richard Syms as Vicar
- Hilary Hodsman as Auntie Pat

== Reception ==
Critical reception for The Living and the Dead was mostly positive, and on review aggregator Rotten Tomatoes the film holds an approval rating of 91% based on 11 reviews.

=== Awards ===
- Fantastic Fest Jury Award for Best Actor at the Fantastic Fest (2006, won - Leo Bill)
- Fantastic Fest Jury Award for Best Director at the Fantastic Fest (2006, won)
- Fantastic Fest Jury Award for Best Make-Up at the Fantastic Fest (2006, won)
- Fantastic Fest Jury Award for Best Picture at the Fantastic Fest (2006, won)
- Fantastic Fest Jury Award for Best Supporting Actress at the Fantastic Fest (2006, won - Kate Fahy)
