= Red White & Blue (film) =

- Theatrical release poster
- Directed by: Simon Rumley
- Written by: Simon Rumley
- Produced by: Bob Portal; Simon Rumley; Adam Goldworm; Tim League
- Starring: Noah Taylor; Amanda Fuller; Marc Senter
- Cinematography: Milton Kam
- Edited by: Robert Hall
- Music by: Richard Chester
- Production companies: Rumleyvision; ScreenProjex; Fidelity Films
- Distributed by: IFC Midnight; Celluloid Nightmares
- Release dates: January 29, 2010 (Rotterdam); October 8, 2010 (United States)
- Running time: 104 minutes
- Country: United States
- Language: English

Red White & Blue is a 2010 revenge-thriller film written and directed by Simon Rumley.

== Plot summary ==
Erica spends her nights trawling the bars and beds of Austin, Texas. Emotionally withdrawn, her only form of human contact is a series of unprotected one-night stands with strangers, whom she picks up irrespective of age or physical appearance. For some reason, however, she keeps a Polaroid photo album of her partners, remembers their faces and those of their acquaintances, and takes caution to avoid sleeping with the same man twice. She lives in a flophouse where she does the cleaning in exchange for room and board. This arrangement with the landlady is discontinued when new boarder Nate moves in, and Erica finds herself in urgent need of a regular income to pay for her stay. Feeling responsible, Nate helps her land a job in the DIY store where he works. Distrustful and reluctant at first, she gradually warms up to the mysterious Nate, who uses an anecdote from his childhood as a metaphor to justify his protective demeanor towards Erica despite his psychopathic tendencies. He also claims to have been honorably discharged from service in Iraq and is apparently considering a job offer by the CIA. Despite his air of danger and Erica's difficulty in leaving her promiscuity behind, the two form a hesitant bond.

Franki Morrison, a young, hot-headed and wannabe rock star, learns on the eve of his band's departure for a European tour that he is HIV-positive. This not only derails his recently rekindled relationship with his girlfriend, but also affects his mother, since he had spent months donating blood to her for her cancer treatment. Distraught by the news and its implications, Franki realizes he must have been infected by Erica, the only woman he had unsafe sex with during the past six months. His two bandmates, who had also partaken in the foursome (shown in the film's initial scenes), test negative. However, their loyalty and that of another friend named Ed leads them to assist Franki in tracking Erica down and forcefully taking her to his home. Erica tacitly admits that she was deliberately exposing sexual partners to HIV but justifies her actions as a response to the rape she suffered as a child by her mother's boyfriend.

Franki's friends reluctantly leave him alone with Erica. Franki then rapes her, makes an awkward marriage proposal based on a warped attempt to rationalize their shared predicament, and keeps her hostage over the next few days. When he learns his mother committed suicide because of her exposure to HIV, Franki stabs Erica in a fit of rage. He and his three friends try to drive her to the hospital, but she dies in their car before they can take off. Her body is dismembered offscreen and, once again out of loyalty, Franki's friends agree to dispose of the parts in separate locations.

Before they can do so, Nate uses his CIA contact to track them down. He tortures and murders all of them, including Ed and his family, revealing himself to be a skilled and sadistic army interrogator. His last victim is Franki, whom he skins alive after retrieving Erica's head. He finally decides to turn down his CIA contact's offer for a job and moves to his sister's place in Tallahassee. Somewhere along his drive to Florida, he buries all of Erica's remains and burns several items, including a picture of their wedding some time earlier.

== Cast ==
- Noah Taylor as Nate
- Amanda Fuller as Erica
- Marc Senter as Franki
- Nick Ashy Holden as Alvin
- Patrick Crovo as Carl
- Jon Michael Davis as Ed
- Saxon Sharbino as Ed's Daughter
- Mark Hanson as Druggie Rock Guy
- Robert Sliger as Oncologist
- Emily Cropper as HIV Clinician

== Production ==
Resident Evil: Apocalypse star Robert Hall worked on the film as Editor. The film was shot in Austin, Texas in the Alamo Drafthouse – 1120 South Lamar Boulevard, Beauty Bar – 617 East 7th Street and The Highball – 1142 South Lamar Boulevard, New Guild Co-Op - 510 West 23rd St. Noah Taylor, Amanda Fuller and Marc Senter played the leads in the Rumleyvision project.

== Release ==
Red White & Blue premiered on January 29, 2010 as part of the International Film Festival Rotterdam. It was featured in several American film festivals: On March 16, 2010, it appeared in the South by Southwest; On March 27, 2010, it appeared in the Boston Underground Film Festival and on July 17, 2010, it appeared in the Danger After Dark Film Festival. The film will run on the Fantasia 2010.

== Reception ==
On Rotten Tomatoes the film has a rating of 84% based on 25 reviews, with an average rating of 7/10. On Metacritic it has a score of 81%, based on 4 reviews. The website Letterboxd lists this movie as belonging to the vetsploitation subgenre.

== Awards ==
The film won the Best of Fest Narrative Award at the 2010 Boston Underground Film Festival.

== Soundtrack ==
Pop artist and producer Richard Chester composed the official score.
