= London Film Critics Circle Awards 2008 =

British film awards ceremony

29th London Film Critics Circle Awards

4 February 2009

Film of the Year:
The Wrestler

British Film of the Year:
Slumdog Millionaire

The 29th London Film Critics Circle Awards, honouring the best in film for 2008, were announced by the London Film Critics Circle on 4 February 2009.

== Winners and nominees ==
=== Film of the Year ===
The Wrestler

- The Curious Case of Benjamin Button
- Frost/Nixon
- Milk
- WALL-E

=== British Film of the Year ===
Slumdog Millionaire

- Happy-Go-Lucky
- Hunger
- In Bruges
- Man on Wire

=== Foreign Language Film of the Year ===
Waltz with Bashir • Israel

- Gomorrah • Italy
- I've Loved You So Long • France
- The Orphanage • Spain
- Persepolis • France

=== Director of the Year ===
David Fincher – The Curious Case of Benjamin Button

- Darren Aronofsky – The Wrestler
- Danny Boyle – Slumdog Millionaire
- Clint Eastwood – Changeling
- Gus Van Sant – Milk

=== British Director of the Year ===
Danny Boyle – Slumdog Millionaire

- Terence Davies – Of Time and the City
- Mike Leigh – Happy-Go-Lucky
- Steve McQueen – Hunger
- Christopher Nolan – The Dark Knight

=== Screenwriter of the Year ===
Simon Beaufoy – Slumdog Millionaire

- Eric Roth – The Curious Case of Benjamin Button
- Peter Morgan – Frost/Nixon
- Martin McDonagh – In Bruges
- David Hare – The Reader

=== Breakthrough British Filmmaker ===
Steve McQueen – Hunger

- Joanna Hogg – Unrelated
- Martin McDonagh – In Bruges
- James Watkins – Eden Lake
- Rupert Wyatt – The Escapist

=== Actor of the Year ===
Mickey Rourke – The Wrestler

- Josh Brolin – W.
- Frank Langella – Frost/Nixon
- Heath Ledger – The Dark Knight
- Sean Penn – Milk

=== Actress of the Year ===
Kate Winslet – The Reader and Revolutionary Road

- Penélope Cruz – Vicky Cristina Barcelona
- Anne Hathaway – Rachel Getting Married
- Angelina Jolie – Changeling
- Meryl Streep – Doubt

=== British Actor of the Year ===
Michael Fassbender – Hunger

- Ralph Fiennes – The Duchess
- Ben Kingsley – Elegy
- Dev Patel – Slumdog Millionaire
- Michael Sheen – Frost/Nixon

=== British Actress of the Year ===
Kristin Scott Thomas – I've Loved You So Long

- Rebecca Hall – Vicky Cristina Barcelona
- Sally Hawkins – Happy-Go-Lucky
- Tilda Swinton – Julia
- Kate Winslet – The Reader and Revolutionary Road

=== British Supporting Actor of the Year ===
Eddie Marsan – Happy-Go-Lucky

- Liam Cunningham – Hunger
- Toby Jones – Frost/Nixon and W.
- Peter O'Toole – Dean Spanley
- Mark Strong – Body of Lies

=== British Supporting Actress of the Year ===
Tilda Swinton – The Curious Case of Benjamin Button

- Hayley Atwell – The Duchess
- Kristin Scott Thomas – Easy Virtue
- Emma Thompson – Brideshead Revisited
- Alexis Zegerman – Happy-Go-Lucky

=== Young British Performer of the Year ===
Thomas Turgoose – Somers Town and Eden Lake

- Asa Butterfield – The Boy in the Striped Pyjamas
- Georgia Groome – Angus, Thongs and Perfect Snogging
- Bill Milner – Son of Rambow
- Dev Patel – Slumdog Millionaire
- Will Poulter – Son of Rambow

=== Dilys Powell Award ===
- Judi Dench
