= Fashionista (film) =

2016 thriller drama film

- Directed by: Simon Rumley
- Screenplay by: Simon Rumley
- Produced by: Bob Portal; Simon Rumley
- Starring: Amanda Fuller; Ethan Embry; Eric Balfour
- Cinematography: Milton Kam
- Edited by: Tom Sainty
- Music by: Richard Chester
- Release date: 2016
- Language: English

Fashionista is a 2016 American thriller drama film written and directed by Simon Rumley. It stars Amanda Fuller, Ethan Embry and Eric Balfour.

== Cast ==
- Amanda Fuller as April
- Ethan Embry as Eric
- Eric Balfour as Randall
- Alex Essoe as the mystery girl
- Alexandria DeBerry as Sherry
- Devin Bonnée as Hank
- Jemma Evans as Theresa
- Carly Christopher as Randall's wife

== Production ==
Rumley penned the script between late 2014 and early 2015. The film was shot in Austin, Texas over 18 days.

== Release ==
The film had its world premiere at the 2016 Fantastic Fest. It was later screened at over two dozen festivals including Busan International Film Festival, Tallinn Black Nights Film Festival, Sitges Film Festival, Sydney Film Festival, and Fantasia International Film Festival. It was released theatrically by Freestyle Releasing.

== Reception ==
On the review aggregator website Rotten Tomatoes, 90% of 10 critics' reviews are positive. The Hollywood Reporter 's critic Stephen Dalton described the film as an "experimental study in obsession and addiction", calling it "oth stylish and creepy", and especially praising "Fuller's robustly committed performance, some nerve-jangling visual shocks and a rich soundtrack". Dennis Harvey from Variety referred to the film as "aesthetically adventurous" and noted "so much of Fashionista is complicated and arresting that the few ways in which it falls short — thematically, psychologically or in narrative cohesion — feel like a fair trade for such ambitious enterprise.".
