= Leo Bill =

English actor (born 1980)

- Born: Leo Martin Bill; 31 August 1980 (age 45); Ealing, London, England
- Occupation: Actor
- Years active: 2001–present
- Parents: Stephen Bill (father); Sheila Kelley (mother)

Leo Martin Bill (born 31 August 1980) is an English actor, best known for his role as James Brocklebank in the 2006 film The Living and the Dead, as well as The Fall, Alice in Wonderland, and the FX/BBC One drama series Taboo. He is son of actors Sheila Kelley and Stephen Bill.

== Filmography ==
=== Film ===
Year	Title	Role	Notes	Ref.
2001	Gosford Park	Jim		
2002	All or Nothing	Young Man		
2002	Two Men Went to War	Private Leslie Cuthbertson		
2002	28 Days Later	Private Jones		
2003	LD 50 Lethal Dose	Danny		
2004	Vera Drake	Ronny		
2005	Kinky Boots	Harry Sampson		
2005	These Foolish Things	Garstin		
2006	The Living and the Dead	James Brocklebank		
2006	The Fall	Orderly / Charles Darwin		
2006	Loony in the Woods	Bouffe		
2007	Becoming Jane	John Warren		
2008	Me and Orson Welles	Norman Lloyd		
2010	Alice in Wonderland	Hamish		
2011	The Girl with the Dragon Tattoo	Trinity		
2014	A Long Way Down	Dr. Stephens		
2014	Mr. Turner	JE Mayall		
2015	National Theatre Live: Hamlet	Horatio		
2016	Alice Through the Looking Glass	Hamish		
2018	Peterloo	John Tyas		
2018	In Fabric	Reg Speaks		
2019	National Theatre Live: The Tragedy of King Richard the Second	Henry Bolingbroke		
2019	Rare Beasts	Pete		
2021	Cruella	Headmaster		
2026	Supergirl	Big Furry Gremlin		

=== Television ===
Year	Title	Role	Notes	Ref.
1984	Eh Brian! It's a Whopper	Paul	2 episodes	
1991	ScreenPlay	Michael Meeks	Episode: "Broke"	
2002	Attachments	Mat	Episode: "The Domino Effect"	
2002	Celeb	Troy Bloke	Series regular	
2002	Crime and Punishment	Drinker	TV film	
2003	Midsomer Murders	Darren	Episode: "A Tale of Two Hamlets"	
2003	Spooks	Corporal Eric Woods	Episode: "Strike Force"	
2003	Canterbury Tales	Terry	Mini-series	
2003	Eroica	Ries	TV film	
2004	Messiah: The Promise	Gerry White	Mini-series	
2005	Silent Witness	Richard	Episode: "The Meaning of Death"	
2005	A Very Social Secretary	Flemming	TV film	
2007	Jekyll	Dave	Mini-series	
2007	Lead Balloon	Garry	Episode: "Idiot"	
2008	Sense and Sensibility	Robert Ferrars	Mini-series	
2008	Ashes to Ashes	Ryan Burns	1 episode	
2009	Home Time	Steve	3 episodes	
2010	Doctor Who	Pilot	Episode:"A Christmas Carol"	
2013	Pramface	Richard	Episode: "The Edge of Hell"	
2013	The Borgias	Cardinal Costanzo	3 episodes	
2013	The White Queen	Reginald Bray	Mini-series	
2017	Taboo	Wilton	Series regular	
2017	Strike	John Bristow	Episode: "The Cuckoo's Calling"	
2018	The Long Song	John Howarth	Mini-series	
2019	Keeping the Wolf Out	Bertalan Lázár		
2020	Hitmen	The DJ	Episode: "Dog"	
2022	Becoming Elizabeth	Henry Grey		
2023–2024	Funny Woman	Tony Holmes	Series regular	

== Theatre ==
In 2010, he appeared as Alistair Ryle in Posh by Laura Wade at the Royal Court Theatre in London. In 2011, he played Charles Surface in Richard Brinsley Sheridan's The School for Scandal at the Barbican Theatre, directed by Deborah Warner. In 2015, he appeared as Horatio in a production of Hamlet at the same venue, alongside Benedict Cumberbatch in the title role.

== Awards and nominations ==
Year	Award	Category	Result	Film	Ref.
2006	Fantastic Fest	Best Actor	Won	The Living and the Dead	
