= Aaron Hill (actor) =

American actor

- Born: April 23, 1983 (age 43); Santa Clara, California, U.S.
- Occupation: Actor
- Years active: 2001–present
- Height: 6 ft 5 in (196 cm)
- Children: 2

Aaron Hill (born April 23, 1983) is an American actor best known for his portrayal of "Beaver" on the television show Greek.

== Early life ==
Hill was born in Santa Clara, California. He started out doing small-time promotional videos for his church in Clovis, California. He is a graduate of Clovis High School.

== Career ==
Hill began his acting career in 2001 with a guest episode role on The Brothers Garcia. He has since been seen in Mad Men, Malcolm in the Middle, Gilmore Girls, Hannah Montana, CSI: Miami, Breaking Bad, and How I Met Your Mother.

From 2007 to 2011, he was a regular on ABC Family's series Greek, portraying fraternity brother Walter "Beaver" Boudreaux. He made a cameo in Transformers: Revenge of the Fallen.

In 2016, he was featured on House Hunters Renovation along with his wife, Chelsea, looking for a home to fit their growing family.

He stopped acting in front of the camera in 2017 and has transitioned to voice-over work.

== Personal life ==
He is married to Chelsea and has two children, a daughter named Scarlett, born in 2015. Their son, Wyatt, was born in April 2017. Chelsea is a group fitness instructor.

In April 2021, for April Fools' Day, Hill alluded to a Greek reunion in 2022.

== Filmography ==
Year	Title	Role	Notes
2001	The Brothers Garcia		
2002	Malcolm in the Middle	George, Reese's Partner in the Three Legged Race	Episode "Company Picnic Part 1 and 2"
2004	Gilmore Girls	Janet's Boyfriend "Kleebold"	Episode "The Incredible Sinking Lorelai's"
2004	Drake and Josh	Witherspoon	Episode “Football”
2007–2011	Greek	The Beaver (Walter Boudreaux)	Recurring Role
2007	Hannah Montana	Wayne	Episode "Sleepwalk This Way"
2007	Mad Men	Carl Winter	Episode "Indian Summer"
2008	Breaking Bad	Bully in a store	Episode "Pilot"
2008	Foreign Exchange	Christopher Hunter	Supporting Role
2008	Cold Case	Mike "Bad Moon" McShane	Episode "Glory Days"
2008	CSI: Miami	Andrew Brodsky	Episode "Raging Cannibal"
2009	How I Met Your Mother	The Frozen Snowshoe	Episode: "Old King Clancy"
2009	Transformers: Revenge of the Fallen	Frat Guy	Supporting Role
2009	Valentine	Nick Cavatelli	
2010	Community	Pizza Guy	
2010	Party Down	Cole Landry	
2011	A Warrior's Heart	Joe Bryant	Supporting Role
2011	Creature	Randy Parker	Prominent Role
2011	Criminal Minds	Jerry Holtz	Episode "Painless"
2012	Glee	Nick	2 Episodes
2012	Fairly Legal	Owen Maiken	
2012	CSI: NY	Harlan Porter	Episode "Flash Pop"
2012	Best Friends Forever	Trevor	
2012	Perception	Brian Cahill	
2012	Rizzoli & Isles	Kevin Baker	
2012	NCIS: Los Angeles	Marine Lieutenant Abernathy	Episode "Free Ride"
2013-2014	Twisted	Eddie	5 Episodes
2014	A Perfect Christmas List	Dr Brandon Reed	Prominent Role
2015	Instant Nanny	Dan Connor	main character
2015	The Night Before	Tommy Owens	
2015	Supernatural	Mike Schneider	
2016	Get a Job	Jason	Supporting Role
2016	Lost On Purpose	D-1	Prominent Role
2016	Castle	Kurt Wilson	Episode "The Fast and the Furriest"
2016	Baby Daddy	Kevin	Episode "All Riles Up"
