= Little Deaths (film) =

- Directed by: Sean Hogan; Andrew Parkinson; Simon Rumley
- Written by: Sean Hogan; Andrew Parkinson; Simon Rumley
- Produced by: Sean Hogan; Andrew Parkinson; Samantha Wright
- Cinematography: Milton Kam
- Edited by: Robert Hall; Jennifer Sheridan
- Music by: Richard Chester; Andrew Parkinson
- Production company: Almost Midnight Productions
- Distributed by: Imagination Worldwide; Image Entertainment (United States)
- Release date: 25 February 2011 (Film4 FrightFest)
- Running time: 94 minutes
- Country: United Kingdom
- Language: English

Little Deaths is a 2011 British anthology horror film written and directed by Sean Hogan, Andrew Parkinson, and Simon Rumley. The film has three segments: House & Home, Mutant Tool, and Bitch. Each segment is directed by a different author and are unrelated to one another in any way other than sharing a theme of sex and death. Critical reviews for Little Deaths were polarized and the United Kingdom DVD release had to have some portions removed due to their sexually violent content.

== Synopsis ==
=== House and Home ===
Richard and Victoria are a married couple who try to alleviate their boredom by picking up homeless women under the guise of a Christian charity, with the intent to abuse them sexually. When they pick up Sorrow, they soon discover that they have taken on more than they can handle, and that Sorrow is not exactly the woman she appears to be.

=== Mutant Tool ===
Jen is a sex worker who visits Dr Reese in order to get help with her drug addiction. The doctor prescribes medication which gives Jen the ability to see frightening visions whenever she touches someone. In her visions, she sees a strange man being held prisoner, who wants to die. Jen does not realise that the doctor’s prescription incorporates the emissions of this mutant man, who is being held captive by the doctor. Dr Reese has been feeding his prisoner human kidneys as part of a twisted post-Nazi experiment. Eventually Jen herself mutates, growing an enormous penis. She in turn becomes the doctor’s next captive, producing excessive emissions from her "mutant tool".

=== Bitch ===
Pete and Claire are in a dysfunctional relationship. Claire routinely subjects Pete to emotional and physical abuse and, in the bedroom, makes him participate in various BDSM activities such as forcing him to live and behave as a dog while he gets pegged. It would appear that the reason behind Claire's abusive behavior towards Pete is that she is extremely cynophobic and takes out her anger on the dogs she fears by treating her boyfriend like a dog. Pete longs for his relationship with Claire to get better and for her to give him more respect and acceptance, but is pushed to his limit when Claire decides, in front of Pete, to sleep with his best friend Al. Pete is devastated and plots his revenge; he destroys all the dog-like artifacts in the house, and then gradually acquires a whole pack of feral dogs, which he deliberately keeps hungry. At home with Claire, he persuades her to be handcuffed naked to their bed, on the pretext he wants to have anal sex with her. But instead he pours dog food on to her buttocks and then releases the entire pack of starving dogs into the bedroom. The film closes to a background of Claire's agonised screams.

== Development ==
Hogan began planning the film anthology after a prior film project did not come to fruition. He approached Parkinson and Rumley with the idea, as Hogan believed that the differences in their filmmaking styles would work well in an anthology setting. The three collaborated on the film as a whole in the pre-production stages, but "kind of went [their] separate ways" after production began.

Hogan has stated that he and Rumley initially had difficulty casting the roles for their segments House & Home and Bitch, as many actors declined to participate after reading the scripts.

== Cast ==
=== House & Home ===
- Luke de Lacey as Richard Gull
- Holly Lucas as Sorrow
- Siubhan Harrison as Victoria Gull
- James Oliver Wheatley as Sorrow's Companion
- Marc Bennett as Homeless
- Jennifer Handorf as Homeless
- Nick Harwood as Homeless
- Mike Hewitt as Homeless
- James Hinson as Homeless
- Eddie Hogan as Homeless
- Kimberly Howson as Homeless
- Paul Goodwin as Homeless
- Andrew Parkinson as Homeless
- Fiona Watt as Homeless
- Danielle White as Homeless

=== Mutant Tool ===
- Jodie Jameson as Jen
- Daniel Brocklebank as Frank
- Brendan Gregory as Dr. Reese
- Christopher Fairbank as X
- Rob 'Sluggo' Boyce as Mutant
- Mike Anfield as Michael
- Scott Ainslie as Middle Aged John
- Steel Wallis as Drew
- James Anniballi as Hoodie
- Errol Clarke as Frank's Accomplice
- Oliver Guy-Watkins as Dealer's Client

=== Bitch ===
- Tom Sawyer as Pete
- Kate Braithwaite as Claire
- Tommy Carey as Al
- Amy-Joyce Hastings as Lucy

== Reception ==
Peter Martin of Twitchfilm wrote "There's sick and twisted, and then there's Little Deaths" and commented that the extreme activities depicted might not be entertaining for some but that it was "more than the ordinary horror flick." Shock Till You Drop and FEARnet both gave predominantly positive reviews, with Shock Till You Drop commenting that "as a whole, Little Deaths is ultimately one of the best horror anthologies I've ever seen, not the least of which because it ignores the pretense of a framing device in favor of ideas that bind its segments more tightly together than a wraparound story ever could".
