= Amanda Fuller =

American actress (born 1984)

- Born: August 27, 1984 (age 42)
- Occupation: Actress
- Years active: 1993–present
- Known for: Last Man Standing
- Spouse: Matthew Bryan Feld
- Children: 1
- Website: amandafuller.com

Amanda Fuller (born August 27, 1984) is an American actress. She is perhaps best known for being the second actress to portray Kristin Baxter on the ABC/Fox sitcom Last Man Standing.

== Career ==
=== Early career ===
In Buffy the Vampire Slayer, Fuller played Eve, one of the potential slayers who appeared in the final season. In 'Til There Was You, Fuller played the role of Debbie, a 13-year-old whose mature role was played by Jennifer Aniston. In Askari, she acted opposite Oscar-winning actress Marlee Matlin.

=== Present career ===
Fuller's credits include cult indie film Red White & Blue and Creature, with appearances in Law & Order: Special Victims Unit, CSI: Crime Scene Investigation, NCIS, 7th Heaven, Judging Amy, Boston Public, Buffy the Vampire Slayer, 8 Simple Rules, The Division, Touched by an Angel, Malcolm in the Middle, The Practice, Without a Trace, L.A. Doctors and That 70s Show and a role in the graphic adventure game Frankenstein: Through the Eyes of the Monster. Fuller directed the Los Angeles production of the theatrical play This is our Youth written by Kenneth Lonergan starring Tyler Williams (of television's Everybody Hates Chris). Fuller was a recurring guest star on the 2012 season of Grey's Anatomy on ABC.

In 2012, Fuller joined the cast of the Tim Allen-starred ABC sitcom Last Man Standing, portraying the role of Kristin Baxter, replacing Alexandra Krosney who played the role in the first season. She also portrayed Madison "Badison" Murphy in the final two seasons of Orange Is the New Black (2018–2019). When ABC cancelled Last Man Standing and FOX Network picked it up, she signed on to continue playing her role as Kristin Baxter in 2018. Fuller made her debut as a director on Last Man Standing in the season 8 episode "Garage Band".

== Personal life ==
Fuller currently resides in Los Angeles, California and is married to Matthew Bryan Feld. They announced in July 2019 that they were expecting their first child after battling with endometriosis her entire life.

== Filmography ==
=== Film ===
Year	Title	Role	Notes
1995	Deadly Whispers	Crystal Acton	TV movie
1996	The Making of a Hollywood Madam	Brittany	TV movie
1997	'Til There Was You	Debbie, Age 13	
1997	Don King: Only in America	Teen Girl #2	TV movie
1998	Carson's Vertical Suburbia	Racelle	TV movie
1998	Real Story	Mallory	TV movie
1998	Whatever It Takes	April	
1998	Safety Patrol	Amanda Fuller, Girl in Hallway	TV movie
1999	The Incredible Genie	Emily	
2000	Children of Fortune	Erica Passenger	TV movie
2001	Askari	Emma Crawshay	
2001	Anatomy of a Hate Crime	Kristen Price	TV movie
2003	The Failures	Sally	
2004	Death, Can I Buy You a Drink?	Cricket King	Short
2005	Conviction		TV movie
2006	Americanese	Holly	
2007	Primal Doubt	Claire Harper	TV movie
2007	Kush	Sandra	
2009	Mr. Sadman	Anna	
2010	Hopeless	Michelle	Short
2010	Red White & Blue	Erica	
2011	Other People's Lives	Alexis	
2011	Freerunner	Dolores	
2011	Creature	Beth	
2012	Beverly Hills Chihuahua 3: Viva La Fiesta!	Spa Employee	Video
2012	The Haun Solo Project: Addicted	Sparkle	Video short
2013	The Barista	Audrey	Short
2013	Cheap Thrills	Audret	
2014	Nanoblood	Lisa	Short
2014	The Brittany Murphy Story	Brittany Murphy	
2014	Starry Eyes	Tracy	
2016	Fashionista	April	
2018	All The Creatures Were Stirring	Linda	

=== Television ===
Year	Title	Role	Notes
1993	Tales of the City	Lexy	TV Mini-Series. Episode: Episode #1.4
1995	Charlie Grace	Jordan	Episode: Bring Me the Head of Darnell Sims
1997	The Tom Show	Katie	Episode: Bad Publicity
1998	L.A. Doctors	Courtney Wilkes	Episode: What About Bob?
1998	Walker, Texas Ranger	Katie	Episode: Code of the West
1998	Party of Five	Hollie	Episode: Naming Names
1998	That '70s Show	Tina Pinciotti	Episode: Eric's Burger Job
1999	One World	Megan	Episode: Tough Love
1999	Two of a Kind	Courtney Collins	Episode: Kevin Burke's Day Off
1999	The Practice	Julie	Episode: A Day in the Life
2000	Malcolm in the Middle	April	Episode: Water Park
2001	Touched by an Angel	Lucy Baker	Episode: Bringer of Light
2001	First Years	Cami	Episode: And Then You Die
2002	8 Simple Rules	Lindsay	Episode: Cheerleader
2002	The Division	Summer Landers	Episode: Welcome Home
2003	Judging Amy	Shannon Ellner	Episode: Tricks of the Trade
2003	Dragnet	Emily Ambrose	Episode: Daddy's Girl
2003	Boston Public	Marie Watson	Episode: Chapter Sixty-Seven
2003	Buffy the Vampire Slayer	Eve	Episode: Showtime
2004	NCIS	Jen Shields	Episode: Terminal Leave
2004	7th Heaven	Leanne	Episode: Bad Boys, Bad Boys, Whatcha Gonna Do
2004	Strong Medicine	Tally	Episode: Prophylactic Measures
2004	Summerland	Tracy	Episode: Pilot
2004	Without a Trace	Jessica Raab / Rebecca / Angie Novell	Episode: Risen
2005-2006	Threshold	Karyn Reynolds	Episodes: The Crossing & Pulse
2006	Bones	Lori Mueller	Episode: The Headless Witch in the Woods
2006	Independent Lens	Tisa	TV series documentary. Episode: My Life... Disoriented
2006	CSI	Cara Day	Episode: Toe Tags
2007	Women's Murder Club	Beth Williams	Episode: Maybe Baby
2007	Close to Home	Sally O'Neil	Episode: Making Amends
2009	Life	Ann Earley	Episodes: I Heart Mom & 5 Quarts
2010	Law & Order: Special Victims Unit	Emma Brooks	Episode: Wet
2011	Rizzoli & Isles	Nancy Lanford	Episode: He Ain't Heavy, He's My Brother
2012	Grey's Anatomy	Dr. Morgan Peterson	Episodes: Moment of Truth, The Lion Sleeps Tonight, One Step Too Far, If Only You Were Lonely & Have You Seen Me Lately?
2012	Scandal	Carly Weston	Episode: Crash and Burn
2012–2021	Last Man Standing	Kristin Baxter	Main role (170 episodes), director (2 episodes)
2018–2019	Orange Is the New Black	Madison "Badison" Murphy	Recurring role, seasons 6–7

=== Video games ===
Year	Title	Role	Notes
1996	Frankenstein: Through the Eyes of the Monster	Gabrielle	
