= Sheila Kelley (British actress) =

British television actress

- Occupation: Actress
- Years active: 1974–2000
- Spouse: Stephen Bill
- Children: 2, including Leo Bill

Sheila Kelley is a British television actress. Her career began in 1974, in the series Village Hall. Further notable appearances were in the series Within These Walls (1978), Empire Road (1978), Play for Today (1975; 1976, in Nuts in May; and 1982), A Touch of Frost (1994), Dangerfield (1998) and Dalziel and Pascoe (1997, 2000). She also acted in movies, including Wish You Were Here (1987) and Secrets & Lies (1996).

She was married to actor Stephen Bill (known from Prick Up Your Ears). Their son Leo Bill is also an actor (known from 28 Days Later).
