= Christopher W. Baker =

English painter (born 1956)

Christopher William Baker RBA (born 1956) is an English landscape painter, watercolourist, draughtsman and author from Sussex, England.

== Career ==
Baker was educated at Kingham Hill School. He trained at West Surrey College of Art and Design and at the University of Exeter, and has been the recipient of several awards and scholarships including a Royal Academy Landscape Scholarship and an Arts Council Grant. He has exhibited extensively in the UK and Canada.

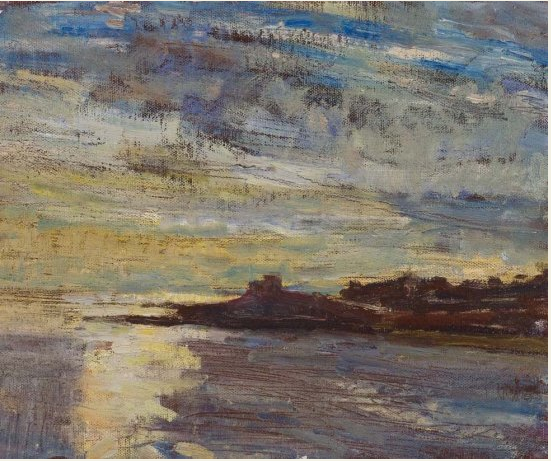
Block House - Morning (oil on canvas)

Baker has been a regular contributor to The Artist Magazine since 1987, and has contributed to art textbooks on painting technique.

He played the part of an artist and painting tutor in Joanna Hogg's film Archipelago, shot on Tresco, Isles of Scilly in 2009. It was shown at the 2010 London Film Festival. and is released in the UK on 4 March 2011. He exhibited works that he produced during the shooting of the film in March 2011 at Flying Colours Gallery in London.

Most recently Baker undertook a project called '64 Days' in which he set himself the routine of returning to the same place to draw and paint on Trundle Hill in West Sussex for an unbroken period from 25 January to 28 March 2012. Some of the works from this project along with other works were exhibited at the Medici Gallery in London in September 2012 in a joint exhibition with the artist Hugo Grenville.

He is senior fine art tutor at West Dean College and runs private courses through his School of Landscape Painting.

== Style ==
His early work has been described as 'photo realist' in style, while his later works of predominantly landscape subjects are in the modern impressionist or abstract style, showing the influence of previous British landscape painters who eschewed solid objects and detail in favour of expressing the spiritual elements of their subjects, such as J. M. W. Turner.

== Awards and Scholarships ==
- 2003 Expedition to Antarctica, Wolfers O’Neil Foundation
- 2002, British Arts Council Major Award
- 2000 South East Arts Award
- Canadian Arts Council
- 1988 Portsmouth Museum of Art, Travelling Exhibition
- Laing National Exhibition, Mall Galleries, Prize Winner
- 1977 Royal Academy Landscape Scholarship
- The David Murray Landscape Scholarship
