= Manitoba Liberal Party candidates in the 2007 Manitoba provincial election =

The Manitoba Liberal Party fielded a full slate of 57 candidates in the 2007 provincial election, and won two seats to remain as the third-largest party in the Legislative Assembly of Manitoba. Some of the party's candidates have their own biography pages; information about others may be found here.

== Candidates ==
Riding	Candidate's Name	Notes	Residence	Occupation	Votes	%	Rank
Arthur-Virden	Fred Curry		Winnipeg	teaching assistant	357	5.14	3rd
Assiniboia	Bernie Bellan		Winnipeg	publisher	459	5.52	3rd
Brandon East	Cheryl Burke		Brandon	business owner	554	7.95	3rd
Brandon West	Martha Jo Willard		Brandon	veterinarian	398	4.04	3rd
Burrows	Bernd Hohne				562	10.49	3rd
Carman	Don Oldcorn				1,293	19.49	3rd
Charleswood	Michael Rosenberg				1,111	13.58	3rd
Concordia	Leslie Worthington				336	6.01	3rd
Dauphin-Roblin	Yarko Petryshyn				385	4.90	3rd
Elmwood	David Love				1,101	17.48	3rd
Emerson	Monica Guetre				1,117	18.30	3rd
Flin Flon	Gary Zamzow				653	22.40	2nd
Fort Garry	Craig Hildahl				1,500	18.39	3rd
Fort Rouge	Paul Hesse				2,488	30.53	2nd
Fort Whyte	Angelina Olivier-Job				1,637	14.22	3rd
Gimli	Lynn Greenberg				727	7.18	3rd
Inkster	Kevin Lamoureux				3,962	57.49	1st
Interlake	Franklin Swark				309	4.54	3rd
Kildonan	Wade Parke				556	6.84	3rd
Kirkfield Park	Doug Kayler				1,273	12.56	3rd
La Verendrye	Roland Chaput				490	6.23	3rd
Lac du Bonnet	Christopher Gmiterek		Winnipeg	Marketer	607	7.36	3rd
Lakeside	Ian Band				488	6.16	3rd
Lord Roberts	Larry Schenkeveld				1,219	15.68	3rd
The Maples	Pritam Brar				928	14.27	3rd
Minnedosa	Christopher Baker				268	3.73	4th
Minto	Wayne Helgason				1,158	21.68	2nd
Morris	Michael Sherby				808	10.45	3rd
The Pas	James Houston				459	6.50	3rd
Pembina	Ralph Gowan				570	8.48	3rd
Point Douglas	Mary Lou Bourgeois				591	14.72	2nd
Portage la Prairie	Marvin Krawec				643	9.25	3rd
Radisson	Murray Cliff		Winnipeg		677	7.99	3rd
Riel	Grant Woods				1,024	11.99	3rd
River East	Margaret von Lau				639	6.80	3rd
River Heights	Jon Gerrard	Party leader			4,760	51.06	1st
Rossmere	Isaiah Oyeleru		Winnipeg	retailer	522	6.55	3rd
Rupertsland	Earl Fontaine				202	5.64	3rd
Russell	Clarice Wilson				564	7.97	3rd
St. Boniface	Gilbert Laberge				1,049	13.61	2nd
St. James	Fred Morris				656	8.63	3rd
St. Johns	Selina Sapong-Bieber				604	9.81	3rd
St. Norbert	Wendy Bloomfield				1,077	14.31	3rd
St. Vital	Harry Wolbert				776	10.36	3rd
Ste. Rose	Janelle Mailhot				465	7.64	3rd
Seine River	Jennifer Lukovich				1,111	10.88	3rd
Selkirk	Karen Keppler				704	8.54	3rd
Southdale	Don Woodstock				1,042	9.22	3rd
Springfield	James Johnston				1,014	11.48	3rd
Steinbach	John Thiessen				351	4.74	3rd
Swan River	Niomi Spence-Pranteau				306	3.95	3rd
Thompson	Kenny Braun				656	15.97	2nd
Transcona	Gerald Basarab		Winnipeg	machinist	604	9.10	3rd
Turtle Mountain	Allen Hunter				739	11.31	3rd
Tuxedo	Audra Bayer				1,865	22.13	3rd
Wellington	Rhonda Gordon Powers				718	16.72	2nd
Wolseley	Raven Thundersky				723	11.44	3rd

== Candidates in post-2007 by-elections ==
Riding	By-election Date	Candidate's Name	Votes	%	Rank
Elmwood	March 24, 2009	Regan Wolfrom	877	20.28	3rd
The Pas	March 24, 2009	Maurice Berens	255	6.50	3rd
Concordia	March 2, 2010	Judi Heppner	613	17.48	3rd
