= San Fabiano Castle =

Castle in Siena

Coordinates: 43.2368°N 11.4243°E

San Fabiano Castle (Italian: Castello San Fabiano) is a 13th-century castle and wine producing farm estate in Monteroni d'Arbia, Siena, Italy, built by King Charles of Anjou. The church of San Fabiano on the estate dates from the year 867 and is dedicated to Pope Fabian, one of the first Christian martyrs killed in the Coliseum. It is adjacent to two rivers, the Arbia and the Biena, and surrounded by 1,800 acres (7 km^{2}) of vineyards, oak forests, durum wheat fields, and corn fields.

The estate's vineyard produces Bianco d'Arbia wine, a D.O.C. wine made with Trebbiano grapes, and a red wine made from Sangiovese grapes. In total some 1,000 bottles per year were currently produced.

When Count Giuseppe and Countess Giovanna Fiorentini bought the San Fabiano farm estate, there were some 300 people farming the land, producing 180,000 liters of wine yearly, breeding Chianina cows, producing meat for the local specialty, the Fiorentina steak, pigs, pheasants, and chickens. In 1956, Fiorentini acquired better equipment and reduced the agricultural activities to a core business of crops.

In 1963, the Italian government introduced drastic reforms of the agricultural regulations, requiring estate owners and landlords to hire the farmers working the land, and pay them a salary. The national reform ended the centennial rules of mezzadria, a system where landowners could have farmers (contadini) living in the farmhouses and working the land, splitting the output of their work 50/50 with the landlord instead of paying rent and receiving salaries. As a result of the reforms, the farmers were forced to leave the land, and twenty-five farmhouses around the castle were abandoned. The farmhouses remained unoccupied for some 30 years. Some of them have been restored by the Fiorentini brothers, and some have been sold.

In the 1970s, a socialist Italian government eased restrictions on import of Cuban cigars, which forced the closure of the Kentucky Tuscan Cigars manufacturing plant on the castle grounds.
