= Joanna Hogg =

British film director and screenwriter (born 1960)

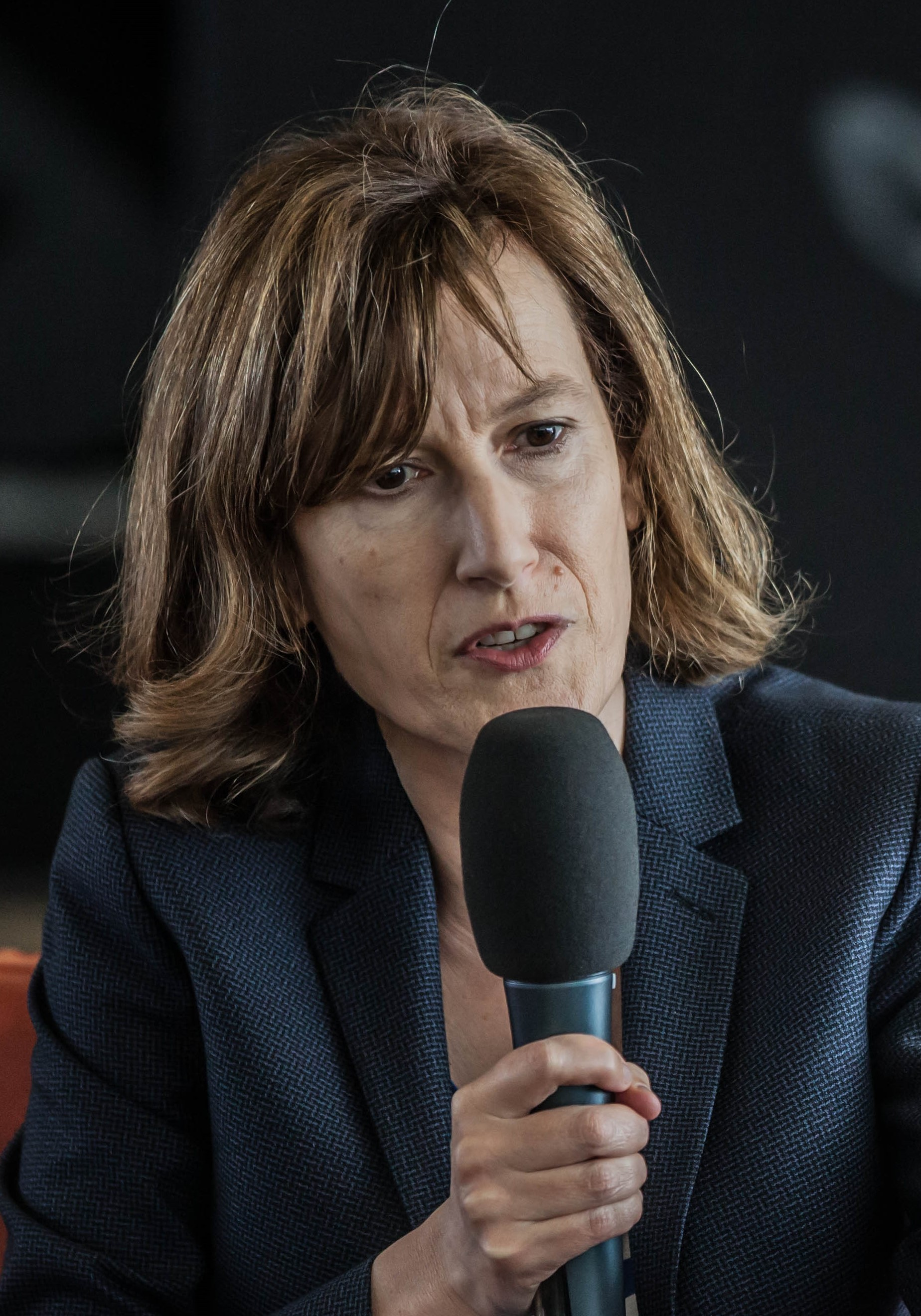
- Hogg in 2014
- Born: 20 March 1960 (age 66); London, England
- Occupation: Filmmaker
- Years active: 1986–present

Joanna Hogg (born 20 March 1960) is an English film director and screenwriter. She made her directorial and screenwriting feature film debut in 2007 with Unrelated followed by Archipelago (2010), Exhibition (2013), The Souvenir (2019), The Souvenir Part II (2021), and The Eternal Daughter (2022). Two of her films topped the Sight & Sound annual poll for best film in their respective years, receiving nominations at the British Independent Film Awards, the Independent Spirit Awards and at the Berlin International Film Festival.

== Career ==
=== Early TV work ===
After leaving school in the late 1970s, Hogg worked as a photographer and began to make experimental super-8 films after borrowing a camera from Derek Jarman, who became an early mentor after a chance meeting in Patisserie Valerie in Soho. One of these, a film about a kinetic sculpture by artist Ron Haselden, won her a place to study direction at the National Film and Television School. In 1986, her graduation piece called Caprice starred Tilda Swinton. On graduation, Hogg directed several music videos for artists such as Alison Moyet, and won her first television commission writing and directing a programme segment for Janet Street-Porter's Channel Four series Network 7, Flesh + Blood. In the 1990s, Hogg directed episodes of London Bridge, Casualty and London's Burning. She also directed the EastEnders special EastEnders: Dot's Story (2003).

=== Film ===
Hogg has said, "I wanted to make a film doing everything I was told not to do in television". She shot her first feature, Unrelated (2007), in Tuscany. It tells the story of a childless woman, Anna (Kathryn Worth), of around forty who goes on holiday to Italy with her friend Verena (Mary Roscoe) and her teenage family. Over the course of the holiday, tensions emerge as Anna spends less time with the 'grown-ups' and is drawn towards the teenage crowd and the attractions of Verena's teenage nephew (Tom Hiddleston). The film received critical acclaim, premiering at the London Film Festival in 2007 and winning the FIPRESCI International Critics Award. It also won the Guardian First Film Award in 2008 and the Evening Standard British Film Awards 'Most Promising Newcomer' Award in 2009, as well as being nominated for their Best Film Award and earning Hogg a nomination for the London Film Critics' Circle 'Breakthrough Filmmaker' Award in 2009.

Her second film, Archipelago, shot on the island of Tresco had its UK premiere at the 2010 London Film Festival, where it was nominated in the Best Film category. It was released in the UK on 4 March 2011 by Artificial Eye. Her third film Exhibition starred musician Viv Albertine and artist Liam Gillick and also featured Hogg's long-time collaborator Tom Hiddleston. The film premiered at the Locarno Film Festival in 2013. Peter Bradshaw writing in The Guardian hailed it as 'a masterful cinematic enigma' awarding it the full five stars.

In the A24 podcast episode "A Bigger Canvas", Martin Scorsese has a conversation with Hogg where it is revealed that he saw her film Archipelago and contacted her about collaborating. He served as an executive producer for her next film, The Souvenir (2019). The film premiered in the Sundance Film Festival. It was released in the United States on 17 May 2019 by A24 and in the United Kingdom on 30 August 2019 by Curzon Artificial Eye. The title refers to the painting of the same name by Jean-Honoré Fragonard and Hogg's personal life, with the performance of Honor Swinton Byrne, Tom Burke and Tilda Swinton. The film was nominated in several film awards ceremonies and festivals, including the Berlin International Film Festival, the British Independent Film Awards and the Independent Spirit Awards.

The sequel, The Souvenir Part II, had its premier at Cannes Film Festival in July 2021, receiving critical acclaim, with nominations at the British Independent Film Awards, the Gotham Awards and at the London Film Critics' Circle.

Hogg's most recent film, The Eternal Daughter, is a mystery-drama film starring Tilda Swinton. The film was premiered at the 2022 Venice Film Festival.

=== Gallery curation ===
In October 2015 Hogg co-curated the retrospective exhibition of film maker Chantal Akerman's installation work, "Chantal Akerman NOW", at the Ambika P3 Gallery. This was the culmination of a two-year-long retrospective of Akerman's work she had programmed with Adam Roberts, with whom she founded the cinema collective A Nos Amours in 2011. The collective is "dedicated to programming over-looked, under-exposed or especially potent cinema". In an interview, Hogg said that "A new generation is growing up who actually don't know the work of directors like Tarkovsky", as a major motivation behind establishing the collective.

== Influences and style ==
Hogg's style is influenced by European and Asian directors such as Eric Rohmer and Yasujirō Ozu, using extended takes and minimal camera movement. She takes the unusual approach of casting a mixture of actors and non-professional actors in her films, such as the landscape painter Christopher Baker in Archipelago. Her depiction of unarguably middle-class characters has prompted some commentators to see her work as spearheading a new type of social realism in British film.

== Filmography ==
=== Feature films ===
Year	Title	Director	Writer	Producer
2007	Unrelated	Yes	Yes	No
2010	Archipelago	Yes	Yes	No
2013	Exhibition	Yes	Yes	No
2019	The Souvenir	Yes	Yes	Yes
2021	The Souvenir Part II	Yes	Yes	Yes
2022	The Eternal Daughter	Yes	Yes	Yes

=== Short films ===
- Caprice (1986)
- Présages (2023)
- Autobiografia di una Borsetta (2025)

=== Only producer ===
- Sunfish (& Other Stories on Green Lake) (2025) - Executive producer

=== Television ===
- Flesh + Blood (miniseries for Network 7) Channel Four (1988)
- Kersplat (six episodes) Channel Four (1991)
- Dance Eight BBC (1992)
- Going Underground Carlton Television (1992)
- Oasis (10-part drama) Carlton Television (1992)
- London Bridge Carlton Television (16 episodes 1995–1996)
- Staying Alive (two episodes) LWT (1997)
- Casualty BBC (1997–1998)
- London's Burning LWT (1999)
- Reach for the Moon (three episodes) LWT (2000)
- EastEnders: Dot's Story BBC (2003)

== Awards and nominations ==
Association	Year	Work	Category	Result	Ref.
Bergen International Film Festival	2019	Cinema Extraordinare Award	The Souvenir	Nominated	
Berlin International Film Festival	2019	Panorama Award	The Souvenir	Nominated	
British Independent Film Awards	2019	Best British Independent Film	The Souvenir	Nominated	
British Independent Film Awards	2019	Best Director	The Souvenir	Nominated	
British Independent Film Awards	2019	Best Screenplay	The Souvenir	Nominated	
British Independent Film Awards	2021	Best British Independent Film	The Souvenir: Part II	Nominated	
British Independent Film Awards	2021	Best Director	The Souvenir: Part II	Nominated	
British Independent Film Awards	2021	Best Screenplay	The Souvenir: Part II	Nominated	
Chlotrudis Awards	2015	Best Director	Archipelago	Nominated	
Cinema Eye Honors	2020	Heterodox Award	The Souvenir	Won	
Cinema Eye Honors	2022	Heterodox Award	The Souvenir: Part II	Pending	
Dublin Film Critics' Circle	2019	Best Screenplay	The Souvenir	Nominated	
Edinburgh International Film Festival	2019	Best British Feature Film	The Souvenir	Nominated	
Evening Standard British Film Awards	2009	Most Promising Newcomer	Unrelated	Won	
Evening Standard British Film Awards	2011	Best Film	Archipelago	Nominated	
Evening Standard British Film Awards	2011	Best Documentary	Archipelago	Nominated	
Independent Spirit Awards	2020	Best International Film	The Souvenir	Nominated	
Gotham Awards	2021	Best International Feature	The Souvenir: Part II	Nominated	
HCA Midseason Awards	2019	Best Female Director	The Souvenir	Nominated	
Locarno Film Festival	2013	Golden Leopard	Exhibition	Nominated	
London Film Critics' Circle	2008	Breakthrough British Filmmaker	Unrelated	Nominated	
London Film Critics' Circle	2019	Screenwriter of the Year	The Souvenir	Nominated	
London Film Critics' Circle	2021	Director of the Year	The Souvenir: Part II	Pending	
London Film Festival	2007	International Critics Award	Unrelated	Won	
