= Fiorentini =

The Fiorentini company, or Fiorentini & C. S.p.A., was founded by the Italian engineer Filippo Fiorentini (Imola, 1876 – Rome, 18 November 1944), a company within an engineering office initially, in 1901, then a factory of excavators in 1919 in Rome, Italy. Filippo Fiorentini was the son of Giuseppe Fiorentini, a Belluno-born former official in the Ministry of the Interior in Rome, and his wife Maria Galotti, daughter of wealthy industrialists from Imola.

Filippo imported and distributed construction equipment. During the time of Fascism, restrictions banned import and he started his manufacturing plant in Via Tiburtina near Stazione Tiburtina (San Lorenzo, in Roma) for the construction of excavators such as scrapers/draglines and cranes under the license of an American company named Bucyrus.

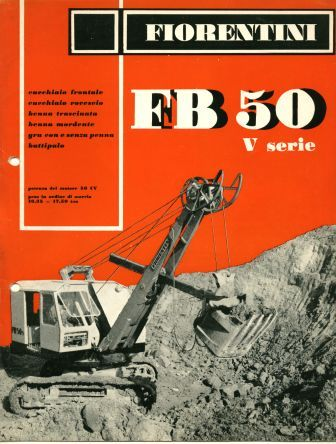
Promotionnal leaflet of the FB50

The first excavators (models FB35 and FB38) were entirely built on site from 1930 to 1940. Around the 1930s, Fiorentini also opened a factory in Fabriano, of Ancona province in the Italian region of the Marche.

New models were scheduled to be produced but were delayed by World War II. During the war, in 1943, 117 workers died in the factory attacked by bombs dropped by the American military. Filippo Fiorentini and his wife died in November 1944 during an other air attack, completely destroying the factory, which drove their son Giuseppe II to rebuild the company afterwards.

The Fiorentini & C. S.p.A. relocated further along the Tiburtina road, to a bigger plant, more modern and very effective. After World War II, the company produced FB50, 60, 100 and the massive FB200 that could hold 1000 tons. In 1951, the success of his business led Giuseppe Fiorentini at the top rank of Rome tax payers.

In the 1960s, there were some design changes. The company also produced bulldozers and hydraulic excavators. By studying Russian, Giuseppe Fiorentini travelled to the Soviet Union and sold two big contracts with their ministry Machino Import, of some 1000 cranes to be used in the enormous project of the Transiberian Pipeline. At that time the company had won a technical and commercial battle against other much bigger companies from Germany. As the sales were strong, both inside Italy for the reconstruction, and in Russia, the company hired as many as 1000 employees, who were working in three plants (Rome, Fabriano, in Italy) and Toronto, Ontario, Canada.

In 1956 Count (a nobility title received from the Republic of San Marino) Giuseppe Fiorentini, son (and heir with his sister Anna Maria) of Filippo and his wife [in 1915] Paola Blasetti, bought a second castle after the San Gallo castle in Nettuno, from Prince Barberini, the farm estate and castle of San Fabiano. A hunting resort, San Fabiano was useful for its public relations, where he invited many of his clients, such as the Russian Ambassador Rijov, and Mac Cormick of International Harvester. In fact, the Company was designing and manufacturing cranes, excavators and crushing plants and represented for Italy the industrial line of H.I.

In 1975, Count Giuseppe Fiorentini filed for bankruptcy and the company was obtained at no cost by another Italian company named Gepi. Gepi then changed its name to Nuova Fiorentini, meaning "New Fiorentini".
