= Christopher Barker =

Christopher Barker may refer to:

- Christopher Barker (officer of arms) (died 1550), English officer of arms
- Christopher Barker (printer) (c. 1529–1599), printer to Queen Elizabeth I
- Chris Barker (linguist), American professor of linguistics at New York University
- Chris Barker (1980–2020), English footballer
- Chris Barker (American football) (born 1990), American football offensive guard
- Chris Barker (Ku Klux Klan), Imperial Wizard of the Loyal White Knights of the Ku Klux Klan
- Chris Barker, bassist of punk group Anti-Flag

== See also ==
- Christopher Baker (disambiguation)
