= Archipelago (2010 film) =

- UK cinema release poster for Archipelago
- Directed by: Joanna Hogg
- Written by: Joanna Hogg
- Produced by: Gayle Griffiths
- Starring: Tom Hiddleston; Kate Fahy; Lydia Leonard; Amy Lloyd; Christopher Baker
- Cinematography: Ed Rutherford
- Edited by: Helle Le Fevre
- Production company: Wild Horses Film Company
- Distributed by: Artificial Eye (UK)
- Release dates: 22 October 2010 (London Film Festival); 4 March 2011 (UK & Ireland)
- Running time: 114 minutes
- Country: United Kingdom
- Language: English

Archipelago is a 2010 British drama film written and directed by Joanna Hogg and starring Tom Hiddleston, Kate Fahy, Lydia Leonard, Amy Lloyd, and Christopher Baker. The plot is about a family holiday on the island of Tresco, which forms part of the archipelago of the Isles of Scilly.

== Plot ==
Edward is in the throes of a quarter-life crisis. He recently quit his job in the city to travel to Africa, where he will perform volunteer work to promote safe sex and combat the spread of AIDS. To see him off, his mother Patricia and sister Cynthia have organised a family holiday and bon voyage party in a cottage in Tresco on the Isles of Scilly. An invitation has also been extended to Patricia's estranged husband, who expresses the vague intention of attending.

His mother and sister have deemed this a family-only holiday and have forbidden Edward to bring his girlfriend Chloe, much to his irritation. Even with the exclusion of Chloe, they have nonetheless invited some outsiders: Christopher, a local painter who has been hired to teach Patricia how to paint the beautiful surrounding landscapes, and Rose, a professional cook.

Things start to fall apart, and the trip quickly turns into mental crisis, anxiety and resentment. Edward starts to wonder if his mother and sister have created this whole holiday with ulterior motives of their own. He seems all too ready to be talked out of his trip to Africa, as he doesn't have the slightest idea what to do with his life afterwards – and comes close to trying to seduce Rose.

The bitter sibling relationship between Edward and Cynthia boils over during the holiday and comes to a head after Edward thinks that not inviting Rose to sit with them at the table is ridiculous. Cynthia insists that because Rose has been hired as a cook, asking her to join them would be uncomfortable. To make up for it, they invite her to a restaurant meal, which Cynthia spoils by complaining and making a fuss about the food until Edward angrily walks out.

Edward's Africa trip begins to look unlikely, upstaged by the beauty of the Isles of Scilly. Fed up by the family's constant arguing, Rose decides to leave earlier than she had planned. She leaves a note in the kitchen for Edward to find. Towards the end, Edward and Cynthia reconcile with each other and with their mother before bidding Christopher farewell. Without ever having seen Patricia's husband, the trio pack up and say goodbye to the house. They board a helicopter back to the mainland and go back to their everyday lives.

== Cast ==
- Tom Hiddleston as Edward
- Kate Fahy as Patricia
- Lydia Leonard as Cynthia
- Amy Lloyd as Rose
- Christopher Baker as Christopher, a non-professional actor and real-life painter
- Alan Mark Hewitt as the chef, English non-professional actor and real-life chef

== Production ==
The film was shot on location on Tresco, Isles of Scilly in 2009. It is produced by Wild Horses Films. Several people who live and work on Tresco appear in the film and are credited as themselves.

== Release ==
Archipelago premiered at the Pusan International Film Festival in 2010, and had its UK premiere at the 2010 BFI London Film Festival, where it was nominated for Best Film. It was released in the UK by Curzon Artificial Eye on 4 March 2011, and in France on 15 December 2021.

== Reception ==
=== Critical response ===
The film has been very well received critically. Archipelago has an approval rating of 96% on review aggregator website Rotten Tomatoes, based on 25 reviews, and an average rating of 7.7/10. The website's critical consensus states: "Sad, funny, and wise in equal measure, Archipelago finds writer-director Joanna Hogg in remarkably strong, confident form". Metacritic assigned the film a weighted average score of 82 out of 100, based on 9 critics, indicating "universal acclaim".

Peter Bradshaw of The Guardian gave the film five stars. It has provoked much comment and debate, particularly focused on its social setting and distinctive cinematic style.

Comedian Stewart Lee briefly references Archipelago in his 2012 standup show Carpet Remnant World, where he describes it as "an art film about middle-class people on a disappointing holiday".
