= In Bruges =

2008 film by Martin McDonagh

- Theatrical release poster
- Directed by: Martin McDonagh
- Written by: Martin McDonagh
- Produced by: Graham Broadbent; Peter Czernin
- Starring: Colin Farrell; Brendan Gleeson; Ralph Fiennes; Clémence Poésy; Jérémie Renier
- Cinematography: Eigil Bryld
- Edited by: Jon Gregory
- Music by: Carter Burwell
- Production companies: Focus Features; Blueprint Pictures; Film4; Scion Films
- Distributed by: Focus Features (United States); Universal Pictures (United Kingdom)
- Release dates: 17 January 2008 (Sundance Film Festival); 8 February 2008 (United States); 18 April 2008 (United Kingdom)
- Running time: 107 minutes
- Countries: United Kingdom; United States
- Language: English
- Budget: $15 million
- Box office: $34.5 million

In Bruges is a 2008 crime comedy-drama film written and directed by Martin McDonagh in his feature-length debut. It stars Colin Farrell and Brendan Gleeson as two London-based Irish hitmen hiding in Bruges, with Ralph Fiennes as their boss. The film is set and was filmed in Bruges, Belgium.

In Bruges premiered as the opening film of the Sundance Film Festival on 17 January 2008. Focus Features gave the film a limited release in the United States on 8 February 2008. In Bruges had its Irish premiere at the Dublin International Film Festival on 15 February 2008. Universal Pictures gave it a full release in Ireland on 7 March 2008, before it opened on 18 April 2008 in the United Kingdom. In Bruges earned $34.5 million at the box office against a production budget of $15 million.

The film received positive reviews from critics, with particular recognition for McDonagh's screenplay and the performances of Farrell and Gleeson. Among its numerous accolades, McDonagh was nominated for the Academy Award for Best Original Screenplay. The film received four British Academy Film Award nominations, with McDonagh winning for Best Original Screenplay. It also received three Golden Globe Award nominations, with Farrell winning Best Actor in a Motion Picture – Musical or Comedy. In 2021, the Writers Guild of America ranked the film's screenplay the 40th-greatest of the 21st century.

== Plot ==
Carrying out his first order, inexperienced hitman Ray shoots a priest during confession, but accidentally kills an altar boy standing in the line of fire. He and his mentor Ken are sent by their boss, Harry, to hide in Bruges, where they are to sightsee and await further instruction. Ken finds the city beautiful and relaxing, while Ray is bored and hates it.

They chance upon a film shoot involving a dwarf actor named Jimmy; this amuses Ray. Ray is attracted to Chloë, a local drug dealer moonlighting as a production assistant. He takes her to a restaurant, where he gets into an argument with a Canadian couple over smoking indoors and punches them. Chloë takes Ray to her apartment where they begin to have foreplay, but her ex-boyfriend Eirik appears and threatens Ray with a handgun. Ray effortlessly disarms the small-time criminal and fires the gun, loaded with blanks, in Eirik's face, blinding him in one eye. Chloë admits that she and Eirik rob tourists, but insists she had told Eirik that Ray was not a target. As Chloë drives Eirik to the hospital, Ray pockets the gun and helps himself to a handful of live rounds as well as Chloë's stash of drugs. He and Ken spend a debauched night with Jimmy, who takes cocaine and rants about a coming war between blacks and whites.

Harry calls Ken and reveals that the trip was an attempt to give Ray a good experience before he dies. He orders Ken to kill Ray, on the principle that killing a child, even accidentally, is unforgivable. With a handgun supplied by Harry's local contact Yuri, Ken tracks Ray to a park and reluctantly prepares to kill him. Ray, however, distraught at his killing of the boy, prepares to kill himself with Eirik's loaded gun. Seeing this, Ken stops Ray, informs him of Harry's order and tells him to leave Bruges to have a fresh start. He gives Ray some money and puts him on a train to another city, while confiscating his gun to prevent a further suicide attempt. Ken phones Harry to tell him the truth, and Harry immediately sets out for Bruges, furious at the insubordination. He picks up a pistol and a box of dumdum bullets at Yuri's, and Eirik learns of his intention.

Meanwhile, police stop Ray's train in the Belgian countryside; they detain Ray for attacking the Canadians and escort him back to Bruges. Chloë bails him out and the two share a drink on the market square beneath the Belfry of Bruges. Meanwhile, Harry spots Ken at a café. As the two have drinks, Harry boasts that if he himself had killed a child, he would have immediately taken his own life. Ken argues that Ray is trying to better himself and deserves a chance at redemption, but Harry is not convinced. Ken suggests they ascend the bell tower for a shootout away from bystanders. At the top, Ken says he accepts whatever punishment Harry intends. A conflicted Harry cannot bring himself to kill Ken, so he shoots him in the leg as punishment for not killing Ray. Eirik crosses the market square and sees Ray and Chloë on a date. He runs up the tower to inform Harry, who is helping Ken down the stairs. Ken tries to disarm Harry, but Harry shoots Ken in the neck before rushing down the tower. Bleeding heavily, Ken drags himself back to the top of the tower and jumps from it to reach Ray first. Ken warns Ray with his dying breath, but his gun is broken during the fall, forcing Ray back to the hotel to retrieve his own.

Harry chases Ray to the hotel; Marie, the pregnant owner, refuses Harry entry, even when he draws his gun. To protect the owner and her unborn child, Harry and Ray agree to continue the chase on a nearby canal. Ray jumps onto a passing barge, but loses Eirik's gun. Harry wounds Ray with a shot from a distance. Ray stumbles into the street where Jimmy's film is shooting; Jimmy is costumed as a schoolboy. Harry catches up and repeatedly shoots Ray with the dumdum bullets. One of the bullets hits Jimmy, blowing his head open. Harry mistakenly believes that he has killed a child and, despite protest from Ray, kills himself. As Ray is loaded into an ambulance, he reflects on the nature of hell, speculating that it is an eternity in the city of Bruges, and hopes desperately that he does not die.

== Cast ==
- Colin Farrell as Ray
- Brendan Gleeson as Ken Daley
- Ralph Fiennes as Harry Waters
- Clémence Poésy as Chloë Villette
- Jordan Prentice as Jimmy
- Thekla Reuten as Marie
- Jérémie Renier as Eirik
- Anna Madeley as Denise
- Elizabeth Berrington as Natalie Waters
- Eric Godon as Yuri
- Željko Ivanek as Canadian Man
- Ciarán Hinds as Priest (uncredited)

== Cultural references ==
The plot has similarities to Harold Pinter's 1957 one-act play The Dumb Waiter. The film also contains many references to the 1973 Nicolas Roeg film Don't Look Now, including the claim by Chloë that the film-within-a-film is almost an homage to it.

== Music ==
In Bruges: Original Motion Picture Soundtrack is the soundtrack to the film, released by Lakeshore Records and featuring the score of Carter Burwell as well as additional music found in the film. The soundtrack was released on 5 February 2008 in the United States and Canada.

== Release and reception ==
In Bruges was released in limited cinemas on 8 February 2008 and opened in 28 theatres in the United States.

=== Box office ===
The film opened at No. 25 in the United States with grossing $125,541 on its opening day and $459,575 on its opening weekend, ranking No. 25 with a per theatre average of $16,413. On its second weekend, it was released in 112 theatres and moved up to No. 22, grossing $970,211, with a per theatre average of $8,663. By its third weekend it moved up further still to No. 21 and made $738,318 from 163 theatres, with a $4,530 per-theatre average. It has a current worldwide total lifetime gross of $33,394,440.

=== Critical response ===
Rotten Tomatoes gave the film a score of 84%, based on 211 reviews, with an average rating of 7.60/10. The website's critical consensus reads: "Featuring witty dialogue and deft performances, In Bruges is an effective mix of dark comedy and crime thriller elements." Metacritic gives the film an average score of 67 out of 100, based on 34 critics, which indicates "generally favorable" reviews.

Chicago Sun-Times critic Roger Ebert gave the film four out of four stars, saying "This film debut by the theater writer and director Martin McDonagh is an endlessly surprising, very dark, human comedy, with a plot that cannot be foreseen but only relished." Tasha Robinson of The A.V. Club gave the film an "A−", praising the performances of the main cast: "Farrell, having successfully made the transition from overexposed-yet-underutilized action-thriller star to one-film-a-year artiste, gets a lot to work with, and he sells it all flawlessly, moving convincingly from offhanded, prickly asshole mode to nervous young lover to disintegrating martyr," and that "then again, all the leads are perfectly cast, and they help turn a light farce with thriller overtones into something deeper and sweeter." About the film itself, she added: "When it's funny, it's hilarious; when it's serious, it's powerful; and either way, it's an endless pleasant surprise." Claudia Puig of USA Today gave the film three and a half stars out of four and praised the two leads, stating that "Brendan Gleeson is brilliant as Ken … along with his partner in crime, Ray, played by Colin Farrell in probably his best performance." About the film, she added that it's "sharply written, superbly acted, funny and even occasionally touching." Damon Wise of Empire magazine gave the film four out of five stars, writing that "with In Bruges, the British gangster movie gets a Croydon facelift. It may not be new, but it's a wonderfully fresh take on a familiar genre: fucked-up, far-out and very, very funny."

John Anderson of The Washington Post gave the film a positive review, writing that "those who know McDonagh's work know a vein of darkness will run deeply through the comedy. It has seldom been darker. Or funnier. He has made a hit-man movie in which you don't know what will happen and can't wait to find out. Every movie should be so clichéd." Mick LaSalle of the San Francisco Chronicle also gave the film a positive review; he praised Farrell's performance, stating that "in the past few months, with Cassandra's Dream and now this, we've found out something about Farrell. He's not a matinee idol, and he's not a suave or heroic leading man. He's a terrific character actor, and he can go to low places that suave heroes can't risk, like anguish, self-hatred, embarrassment, utter confusion and buffoonery." About the film, he added that it's "witty and lively, with a soul to it, as well." Dana Stevens of Slate magazine also praised the performances of the two leads: "Farrell, who just played a remarkably similar tortured killer for hire in Woody Allen's Cassandra's Dream, finds just the right tone for this twitchy, funny, emotionally volatile thug; for once, he seems to know exactly what movie he's in. So does Brendan Gleeson, the big, shambling, sad-eyed Irish actor known to American audiences mainly for his role in the last two Harry Potter movies." She continued about the film: "A jolly mess of a movie. Overplotted, choppy, and contrived, it nonetheless has a curious vitality that makes you wonder where McDonagh will go next." James Berardinelli of ReelViews gave the film two-and-a-half stars out of four, writing that "the acting is top-notch. Colin Farrell, who seems to be gravitating increasingly toward smaller films, effectively channels his manic energy. He and Brendan Gleeson display chemistry in the Odd Couple vein, occasionally giving rise to instances of humor. Ralph Fiennes plays one of the most twisted roles of his career."

Lisa Schwarzbaum of Entertainment Weekly gave the film a "C+", indicating a mixed review; she praised McDonagh's directing, stating that "he's a specialist in constructing satisfying, live-wire dramas of violence that crash up against despair, in upending his characters' miseries with moments of twisted humor, and in sustaining a writing voice that roars with a particularly Irish robustness of obscenity." She also added that "neither star is sloppy, but both are loose and mellow—a couple of pros who know they're the whole show." Ella Taylor of Village Voice also gave the film a mixed review, stating that "Bruges may be the movie's rather too-long-running joke, but Farrell's shaggy brow is easily the most entertaining thing in Irish playwright Martin McDonagh's first foray into the crime caper."

Scholar Molly Ferguson said the film portrays masculinity as unstable and performative, often presenting chivalric ideals that are immediately undermined by violent behavior to expose the hypocrisy of hypermasculinity and its role in perpetuating cycles of violence.

=== Accolades ===
At the 81st Academy Awards, McDonagh was nominated for Best Original Screenplay. In Bruges received four nominations at the 62nd British Academy Film Awards, including Outstanding British Film and Best Actor in a Supporting Role (Gleeson), with McDonagh winning for Best Original Screenplay. The film received three nominations at the 66th Golden Globe Awards: Best Motion Picture – Musical or Comedy, and Best Actor in a Motion Picture – Musical or Comedy for Farrell and Gleeson, with Farrell winning. It was chosen by the National Board of Review as one of the top 10 independent films of the year.

=== Legacy ===
In December 2021, the film's screenplay was listed number forty on the Writers Guild of America's "101 Greatest Screenplays of the 21st Century (so far)". In 2025, it was one of the films voted for the "Readers' Choice" edition of The New York Times' list of "The 100 Best Movies of the 21st Century," finishing at number 112.

=== Home media ===
The film was released on DVD in Region 1 on 24 June 2008; region 2 on 11 August 2008; and Region 4 on 21 January 2009. It was also released on Blu-ray on 27 January 2009; and in region 1 on 13 July 2010. On 27 September 2022, Kino Lorber re-released the film in 4K Ultra HD.

== See also ==
- List of cult films
