= Robert J. Stone =

Bob Stone - Early Canadian Music Entrepreneur

Robert J. (Bob) Stone (1944–2009) was a Canadian music entrepreneur who worked as an independent label owner, record promoter, producer, cover designer and publisher. He is known for the Stone Records label and World Records Group which manufactured records for several hundred independent acts including Nash The Slash and Rough Trade.

== Career ==
Stone was born in Brampton, Ontario in 1944 and moved to Oshawa, Ontario in the 1960s where he lived until his death in 2009. Following his relocation to Oshawa, he founded Robert J. Stone and Associates and soon thereafter, the Stone Records label.

At the start of 1966, Stone represented over thirty labels in Canada including Island Records, Fontana Records, Ariola Records, Discobel and Sapraphon. The most notable of these was Island Records, which Stone Records acquired the Canadian licensing rights to in 1966. Working with Island Records founder Chris Blackwell, Stone convinced him that the record "Shotgun Wedding" by Roy 'C' was going to be a hit and urged him to release it as a single. "Shotgun Wedding" became a hit, and Stone's prediction led to Stone Records acquiring the rights to Island Records for Canadian releases. This arrangement meant that the majority of the early LP releases on Stone Records were Island titles. These included the first Spencer Davis Group album, as well as artists such as Millie Small, Jackie Edwards, Traffic and Spooky Tooth. Stone licensed albums from Scandinavian acts such as The New Beatnicks and The Hounds for Canadian release. This international activity was not limited to importing foreign releases: Stone also got Canadian acts Tom Northcott and Joey Hollingsworth international releases. During these years, Stone began working with trumpeter and composer Johnny Cowell. Cowell was known as the composer of Walk Hand in Hand and His Girl, and as a trumpeter with the Toronto Symphony Orchestra for several decades.

In addition to albums, Stone Records were responsible for several 45 RPM single releases. Stone had already released "Ronnie Dove and the Ron-Als - Beach Rat" in 1964 (Dove would later be a member of legendary Canadian psych band Rockadrome), but the deal with Island Records led to a flood of Island single releases on Stone Records in 1966. These were successful for both Stone and Island and involved a large amount of record plugging. In 1966, Jimi Hendrix travelled to Oshawa in hopes of signing a deal with Stone, but Stone lacked the funds to sign him and had to pass on the opportunity.

In 1967, Stone started two new labels: Caledon, a country label featuring acts Orval Prophet and Dallas Harms, and Now Records, featuring the bands Crowbar and the British North America Act. Stone acquired additional labels for distribution including Flop and Gold Standard. This year also saw the release of the first two Kensington Market (band) 45 singles on Stone Records and marked the start of a budget line of country LPs. The distribution deal with Island concluded in 1968, and Caledon and Now both shut down that same year. The Stone imprint also dissolved with its final release, a charity record entitled "Christmas Is My Love".

Over the next few years, Stone started several short-lived labels, including Cascade, Ampersand, Scope and World Records, most of which were inactive by the early 1970s. Audat (Audio Atlantic) was one exception. Assisted by Stone's opening of a studio in Halifax, Audat focussed on Maritime talent releasing titles by Ryan's Fancy, Ron Hynes, The Fogartys and fiddler Lee Cremo. Stone also brought their mobile equipment to MUN radio in St. John's where he recorded a number of musicians. Most acts on Audat were from the Maritimes, but there were exceptions like Toronto's Carol Lipson and the Toronto Symphony Orchestra It was also home to Don Harron and his character "Charlie Farquarson" releasing several albums by this Canadian comedian.

The Canadian Talent Library, which was set up to provide Canadian content for MOR radio, had a number of releases on Audat, including Peter Appleyard, Rob McConnell and the Laurie Bower Singers.

When Audat closed, Stone was left to focus on World Records, which was primarily a custom record presser. Stone had unique distribution and packaging ideas, and independent acts and small labels would approach World to have records made for them. As a result, World saw a variety of musical talent come through the door. This included the band Rough Trade with their first "Direct to Disc" album, as well as Nash the Slash (Bedside Companion); The Scorpions Lonesome Crow (on Bomb Records), and Hagood Hardy. World also manufactured cassette tapes and transitioned to CDs as LP sales fell, but the competition was much fiercer with CDs as many production plants dealt with artists directly without the need for distribution brokers like World Records.

Later in his career, Stone operated Newcastle Graphics Factory, a printing and design business he had originally set up to service World Records clients. He continued with this business until he died in 2009.
