= Angels in America =

1993 Pulitzer Prize–winning play by Tony Kushner

- Original language: English
- Written by: Tony Kushner
- Characters: Prior Walter; Roy Cohn; Joe Pitt; Harper Pitt; Hannah Pitt; Louis Ironson; Belize; Ethel Rosenberg; Homeless Woman; Angel
- Genre: Drama
- Setting: New York City, Salt Lake City, and elsewhere, 1985–1986

Premiere
- Date: May 1991
- Place: Eureka Theatre Company; San Francisco, California

Angels in America: Perestroika
- Original language: English
- Written by: Tony Kushner
- Characters: Prior Walter; Roy Cohn; Joe Pitt; Harper Pitt; Hannah Pitt; Louis Ironson; Belize; Ethel Rosenberg; Angel
- Genre: Drama
- Setting: New York City, the Kremlin, heaven, and elsewhere, 1986–1990

Premiere
- Date: November 8, 1992
- Place: Mark Taper Forum; Los Angeles, California

Angels in America: A Gay Fantasia on National Themes is a 1991 two-part play by American playwright Tony Kushner. The two parts of the play, Millennium Approaches and Perestroika, are occasionally presented separately. The work won numerous awards, including the Pulitzer Prize for Drama, the Tony Award for Best Play, and the Drama Desk Award for Outstanding Play. Part one of the play premiered in 1991, followed by part two in 1992. The full play premiered in 1992 at Center Theatre Group in Los Angeles. Later that same year it had its UK premiere at the National Theatre in London, while its Broadway opening was in 1993.

In 2017, Angels in America received a much-acclaimed National Theatre revival that won the Laurence Olivier Award for Best Revival. Later that year, the production transferred to Broadway, where it won three Tony Awards, including Best Revival of a Play.

The play is a complex, often metaphorical, and at times symbolic examination of AIDS and homosexuality in the United States in the 1980s. Certain major and minor characters are supernatural beings (angels) or deceased persons (ghosts), some based on historical figures. The play contains multiple roles for several actors. Initially and primarily focusing on one gay and one straight couple in Manhattan, the plot has several additional storylines, some of which intersect occasionally.

Playwright and professor of theater studies John M. Clum called the play "a turning point in the history of gay drama, the history of American drama, and of American literary culture". It is widely regarded as one of the greatest plays of the 20th century and of all time.

== Plot ==
Set in New York City, the play takes place between October 1985 and February 1986.

=== Part One: Millennium Approaches ===
The first part begins at a funeral, where an elderly rabbi eulogizes the deceased woman's entire generation of immigrants who risked their lives to build a community in the United States. Soon after, the deceased's grandson, Louis Ironson, learns that his lover Prior Walter, the last member of an old stock American family, has AIDS. As Prior's illness progresses, Louis becomes unable to cope, and he abandons Prior during a health episode that lands him in the hospital. Prior is given emotional support by their friend Belize, a hospital nurse and ex-drag queen, who separately also deals with Louis's self-castigating guilt and myriad excuses for leaving Prior.

Joe Pitt, a Mormon Republican clerk in the same judge's office where Louis holds a word-processing job, is offered a position in Washington, D.C. by his mentor, the McCarthyist lawyer and power broker Roy Cohn. Joe hesitates to accept due to his agoraphobic, Valium-addicted wife Harper, who refuses to relocate. Feeling adrift and undesired by Joe, Harper retreats into drug-fueled escapist fantasies, including a dream where she crosses paths with Prior even though the two of them have never met in the real world. She confronts Joe about his deeply-closeted homosexuality, which he views as a sin. Torn by pressure from Roy and a burgeoning infatuation with Louis, Joe drunkenly comes out to his conservative mother Hannah, who reacts by changing the subject and hanging up the phone. Concerned for her son, she sells her house in Salt Lake City and travels to New York. After Joe confesses his homosexuality to a drug-addled Harper and leaves her, she flees their apartment and wanders the streets of Brooklyn, believing she is in Antarctica. Joe sets out to look for her, but follows Louis to Central Park, where they tentatively begin an affair.

Meanwhile, Roy Cohn discovers that he has advanced AIDS and is dying. Defiantly refusing to publicly admit he is gay or has AIDS, Roy instead declares he has liver cancer. Facing disbarment for misappropriating money from a client, Roy is determined to beat the case so he can die a lawyer in good standing, and he attempts to position Joe in the Department of Justice to ensure the case is quashed. When Harper disappears and Joe refuses his offer, Roy flies into a rage and collapses in pain. As he awaits transport to the hospital, he is haunted by the ghost of Ethel Rosenberg, whom he prosecuted in her trial for espionage, and who was executed after Roy illegally lobbied the judge for the death penalty.

Prior begins to experience intense dreams and visions as his health worsens. He hears the voice of an angel telling him to prepare for her arrival, a flaming book erupts from the floor during a medical check-up, and he receives visits from the ghosts of two ancestral Prior Walters, informing him that he is a divine prophet. Prior does not know if these visitations are hallucinations caused by an emotional breakdown or if they are real. At the end of Part One, a glorious winged Angel crashes through Prior's bedroom ceiling, addresses him as "Prophet", and proclaims that "the Great Work" has begun.

=== Part Two: Perestroika ===
The second part begins with a speech given by the world's oldest living Bolshevik, Aleksii Antedilluvianovich Prelapsarianov, addressing a crowd in Moscow in December 1985. He condemns the reforms proposed by Mikhail Gorbachev, decrying the notion of progress without political theory and declaring that the only way forward is to not move.

At the funeral of a friend, a shaken Prior relates his encounter with the Angel to Belize. After revealing the presence of a mystical book underneath the tile in Prior's kitchen, the Angel reveals to him that Heaven is a beautiful city that resembles San Francisco, and God, described as a great flaming Aleph, created the universe through copulation with His angels, who are all-knowing but unable to create or change on their own. God, bored with the angels, made mankind with the power to change and create. The progress of mankind on Earth caused Heaven to suffer earthquake-like tremors and physically deteriorate. Finally, on the day of the San Francisco earthquake in 1906, God abandoned Heaven. The Angel brings Prior a message for mankind—"stop moving!"—in the belief that if man ceases to progress, Heaven will be restored. Since the night of his vision, his health has once again started to decline. Belize believes that Prior is projecting his own fears of abandonment and death into an elaborate hallucination, but Prior suspects that his illness is the prophecy taking physical form and that the only way the Angel can force him to deliver her message is for him to die.

Roy lands at the hospital in the care of Belize, where his condition rapidly declines. He manages to use his political clout to acquire a private stash of the experimental drug AZT at the expense of withholding the drug from participants in a drug trial. Alone in the hospital and fighting disbarment, Roy finds himself increasingly isolated, with only Belize, who despises him, and the ghost of Ethel for company.

Prior goes to a Mormon visitors center to research angels, where he meets Hannah, who is volunteering there and taking care of Harper, who has slowly returned to reality but is now deeply depressed. Harper and Prior share a spark of recognition from their earlier shared dream, and witness a vision of Joe and Louis together. Louis is aghast to learn that Joe is a practicing Mormon and, regretting his actions and resistant to the intensity of Joe's infatuation, begins to withdraw from Joe. He begs Prior's forgiveness, which Prior angrily refuses, and Prior, who knows about Louis's affair with Joe from his vision, becomes deeply hurt that Louis is attempting to move on.

Joe visits Roy, who is near death, and receives a final paternal blessing from his mentor. However, when Joe confesses he has left Harper for a man, Roy rejects him in a violent reaction of fear and rage, ordering him to return to his wife and cover up his indiscretion. Joe returns to Harper, and they have an unsatisfying sexual encounter, which prompts Harper to realize their marriage is over.

Prior, accompanied by Belize, jealously confronts a confused Joe at work, but the encounter descends into chaos when Belize recognizes Joe as Roy's protegé. Belize informs Louis about Joe's connection with Roy, whom Louis despises. Louis, as a result, researches Joe's legal history and confronts him over a series of hypocritical and homophobic decisions Joe himself wrote. The confrontation turns violent, and Joe punches Louis in the face, ending their affair.

Ethel Rosenberg watches Roy suffer and decline before delivering the final blow as he lies dying: He has been disbarred after all. Delirious, Roy seems to mistake Ethel for his mother, begging her to comfort him, and Ethel sings a Yiddish lullaby as Roy appears to pass away. However, with a sudden burst of energy, he reveals that he has tricked her, viciously declaring that he has "finally [made] Ethel Rosenberg sing". He then suffers a stroke and dies. After Roy's death, Belize forces Louis to visit Roy's hospital room, where they steal his stash of AZT for Prior. Belize asks Louis to recite the Kaddish for Roy. Unseen by the living, Ethel guides Louis through the prayer, symbolically forgiving Roy before she departs for the hereafter.

After his confrontation with Joe, Prior begins following him obsessively, neglecting his health. He collapses from pneumonia after following Joe to the Mormon center, and Hannah rushes him back to the hospital. Prior tells her about his vision and is surprised when Hannah accepts this, based on her belief in angelic revelations within Latter-day Saint theology. At the hospital, the Angel reappears, enraged that Prior has rejected her message. Prior, on Hannah's advice, wrestles the Angel, who relents and opens a ladder into Heaven. Prior climbs into Heaven and tells the council of Angels that he refuses to deliver their message, as without progress, humanity will perish, and he begs them for more Life, no matter how horrible the prospect might be. He returns to his hospital bed, where he awakens from his vision with his fever broken and his health beginning to recover. He makes amends with Louis but refuses to take him back. Meanwhile, Harper departs New York for San Francisco, leaving Joe alone.

The play concludes in 1990, five years later. Prior and Louis are still separated, but Louis, along with Belize, remains close in order to support and care for Prior, and Hannah has found a new perspective on her rigid beliefs, forging a friendship with the three gay men. Prior, Louis, Belize, and Hannah gather before the angel statue in Bethesda Fountain, discussing the fall of the Soviet Union and what the future holds. Prior talks of the legend of the Pool of Bethesda, where the sick were healed. Prior delivers the play's final lines directly to the audience, blessing them and affirming his intentions to live on and telling them that "the Great Work" shall continue.

=== Additional scenes ===
The initial print editions of the play include two scenes in Perestroika that were frequently deleted from productions. With the publication of the "Revised and Complete Edition" in 2013, Kushner elected to follow "the verdict of twenty-two years of production history" and placed them in the play's appendix.

- The former Act Five, Scene 6, where Prior runs into Rabbi Isidor Chemelwetz and Sarah Ironson, Louis' grandmother, as they play cards in the streets of Heaven.
- A scene taking place between Act Five Scene 7 and 8, where a deceased Roy Cohn in the afterlife offers to represent God in a paternity suit filed by the angels.

== Characters ==
The play is written for eight actors, each of whom plays two or more roles. Kushner's doubling, as indicated in the published script, requires several of the actors to play different genders.

=== Main characters ===
- Prior Walter – A gay man with AIDS. Throughout the play, he experiences various heavenly visions. When the play begins, he is dating Louis Ironson. His best friend is Belize.
- Louis Ironson – Prior's boyfriend. Unable to deal with Prior's disease, he ultimately abandons him. He meets Joe Pitt and later begins a relationship with him.
- Harper Pitt – An agoraphobic Mormon housewife with incessant Valium-induced hallucinations. After a revelation from Prior (whom she meets when his heavenly vision and her hallucination cross paths), she discovers that her husband, Joe, is gay and struggles with it, considering it a betrayal of her marriage.
- Joe Pitt – Harper's husband and a deeply closeted gay Mormon, clerk at the U.S. Court of Appeals, Second Circuit, and friend of Roy Cohn. Joe eventually abandons his wife for a relationship with Louis. Throughout the play, he struggles with his sexual identity.
- Roy Cohn – A closeted gay lawyer, based on real life Roy Cohn. Just as in history, it is eventually revealed that he has contracted HIV and the disease has progressed to AIDS, which he insists is liver cancer to preserve his reputation.
- Hannah Pitt – Joe's mother. She moves to New York after her son drunkenly comes out to her on the phone. She arrives to find that Joe has abandoned his wife.
- Belize – A nurse and former drag queen, he is Prior's ex-boyfriend and best friend. He later becomes Roy Cohn's nurse.
- The Angel/Voice – A messenger from Heaven who visits Prior and tells him he is a prophet.

=== Minor characters ===
- Rabbi Isidor Chemelwitz – An elderly orthodox Rabbi. He performs the funeral service for Louis's grandmother in Act one of Millennium Approaches and gives him advice on his situation with Prior. Played by the actor playing Hannah.
- Mr. Lies – One of Harper's imaginary friends. A smooth talking agent for the International Order of Travel Agents. Played by the actor playing Belize.
- Emily – Prior's hospital nurse, a no-nonsense Italian-American. Played by the actor playing the Angel.
- Henry – Roy Cohn's doctor, who diagnoses him with AIDS. Played by the actor playing Hannah.
- Martin Heller – A publicity agent to the Reagan Administration's Justice Department and Roy's toady. Played by the actor playing Harper.
- Ethel Rosenberg – The ghost of a woman executed for being a Communist spy. She haunts Roy, whom she blames for her conviction and execution, as he dies. Played by the actor playing Hannah.
- Prior 1 and Prior 2 – The ghosts of two of Prior Walter's ancestors. Prior 1 is a gloomy Yorkshire farmer from the 13th century, Prior 2 is a cheerful 17th-century British aristocrat. They appear to Prior to herald the Angel's arrival. Played by the actors playing Joe and Roy, respectively.
- The Man in the Park – A gay man Louis encounters while cruising for sex in Central Park. Played by the actor playing Prior.
- Sister Ella Chapter – Hannah's realtor friend who helps her sell her house. Played by the actor playing the Angel.
- A Homeless Woman – A crazed homeless woman Hannah encounters when she arrives in Brooklyn. Played by the actor playing the Angel.
- The Eskimo – An imaginary friend in Harper's Antarctic hallucination. Played by the actor playing Joe.
- Aleksii Antedilluvianovich Prelapsarianov – "The World's Oldest Living Bolshevik", whose speech in the opening of Perestroika sets up the theme of whether the world should continue to move forward. Played by the actor playing Hannah.
- Mormon Family – A mannequin family in the Diorama Room of the Mormon Visitors' Center where Hannah and Harper volunteer. The father resembles Joe, and later becomes him in Harper's delusions. He is played by the actor playing Joe. The mother comes to life in Harper's imagination and speaks to her. She is played by the actor playing the Angel. The two sons, Caleb and Orrin, are mannequins and are voiced offstage by the actors playing Belize and the Angel respectively.
- The Continental Principalities – The Angel Council Prior confronts in Heaven. They are in charge of both Heaven and Earth after God's desertion. They are the Angels Europa (played by the actor playing Joe), Africanii (played by the actor playing Harper), Oceania (played by the actor playing Belize), Asiatica (played by the actor playing Hannah), Australia (played by the actor playing Louis), and Antarctica (played by the actor playing Roy).

== Production history ==
Front cover of the programme for the 1992 National Theatre production of part one of the play

Angels in America was commissioned by the Eureka Theatre Company in San Francisco, by co-artistic directors Oskar Eustis and Tony Taccone. It was first performed in Los Angeles as a workshop in May 1990 by the Center Theatre Group at the Mark Taper Forum.

Millennium Approaches premiered in May 1991 in a production performed by the Eureka Theatre Company of San Francisco, directed by David Esbjornson. In London it premiered in a National Theatre production at the Cottesloe Theatre, directed by Declan Donnellan. Henry Goodman played Cohn, Nick Reding played Joe, Felicity Montagu played Harper, Marcus D'Amico played Louis, and Sean Chapman played Prior. Opening on January 23, 1992, the London production ran for a year. In November 1992 it visited Düsseldorf as part of the first Union des Théâtres de l'Europe festival.

The play's second part, Perestroika, was still being developed as Millennium Approaches was being performed. It was performed several times as staged readings by both the Eureka Theatre (during the world premiere of part one in 1991), and the Mark Taper Forum (in May 1992). It premiered in November 1992 in a production by the Mark Taper Forum, directed by Oskar Eustis and Tony Taccone. In November 1993 it received its London debut at the National Theatre on the Cottesloe stage, in repertory with a revival of Millennium Approaches, again directed by Declan Donnellan. David Schofield played Cohn, Daniel Craig played Joe, Clare Holman played Harper, Jason Isaacs played Louis, Joseph Mydell played Belize and won the Laurence Olivier Award for Best Supporting Actor, and Stephen Dillane played Prior.

The entire two-part play debuted on Broadway at the Walter Kerr Theatre in 1993, directed by George C. Wolfe, with Millennium Approaches performed on May 4 and Perestroika joining it in repertory on November 23, closing December 4, 1994. The original cast included Ron Leibman, Stephen Spinella, Kathleen Chalfant, Marcia Gay Harden, Jeffrey Wright, Ellen McLaughlin, David Marshall Grant and Joe Mantello. Among the replacements during the run were F. Murray Abraham (for Ron Leibman), Cherry Jones (for Ellen McLaughlin), Dan Futterman (for Joe Mantello), Cynthia Nixon (for Marcia Gay Harden) and Jay Goede (for David Marshall Grant). Millennium Approaches and Perestroika were awarded, in 1993 and 1994 respectively, both the Tony Awards for Best Play and Drama Desk Awards for Outstanding Play.

The published script indicates that Kushner made a few revisions to Perestroika in the following year. These changes officially completed the work in 1995. In 1994, the first national tour launched at the Royal George Theater in Chicago, directed by Michael Mayer, with the following cast: Peter Birkenhead as Louis Ironson, Reginald Flowers as Belize, Kate Goehring as Harper Pitt, Jonathan Hadary as Roy Cohn, Philip E. Johnson as Joe Pitt, Barbara E. Robertson as Hannah Pitt, Robert Sella as Prior, and Carolyn Swift as the Angel.

The Australian premiere of Millennium Approaches was produced by Melbourne Theatre Company at Russell Street Theatre on 15 October 1993, running till 20 November 1993. The Australian premier of the entire two-part play was also produced by Melbourne Theatre Company, presented at the Playhouse, Melbourne, on 30 August 1994, running through till 25 September 1994. .

A Toronto production of both plays, directed by Bob Baker, opened at CanStage's Berkley Theatre in November 1996 and ran for 8 months. The cast included Steve Cumyn (Prior), Alex Poch-Goldin (Louis), Tom Wood (Roy Cohn), Patricia Hamilton (Hannah, Ethel Rosenberg and others), David Storch (Joe), Karen Hines (Harper), Cassel Miles (Belize, Mr. Lies and others) and Linda Prystawska (Angel and othes).

Kushner made relatively minor revisions to Millennium Approaches and additional, more substantial revisions to Perestroika during a run at the Signature Theatre in 2010, which were published in a 2013 complete edition. That production was directed by Michael Greif and featured Christian Borle as Prior, Zachary Quinto as Louis, Billy Porter as Belize, Bill Heck as Joe, Zoe Kazan as Harper, Robin Bartlett as Hannah, Frank Wood as Roy, and Robin Weigert as the angel.

In 2013, a production of the two-part play was produced by Sydney-based theatre company, Belvoir. The cast featured Luke Mullins as Prior Walter, Mitchell Butel as Louis Ironson, Marcus Graham as Roy Cohn, Ashley Zukerman as Joe Pitt, Amber McMahon as Harper Pitt, Robyn Nevin as Hannah Pitt, DeObia Oparei as Belize, and Paula Arundell as The Angel. The show ran from June 1 to July 14 at the Belvoir St Theatre, before transferring to the Theatre Royal for the remainder of its run. The production finished its season on July 27.

A second Toronto production by Soulpepper Theatre Company in 2013 and 2014 starred Damien Atkins as Prior Walter, Gregory Prest as Louis, Mike Ross as Joe, Diego Matamoros as Roy and Nancy Palk as Hannah, Ethel Rosenberg and the rabbi.

Millennium Approaches made its Edinburgh Fringe Festival debut, in a production by St Andrews-based Mermaids Theatre, in August 2013 to critical acclaim.

Asia premiered the play in its entirety in 1995 by the New Voice Company in the Philippines. This was followed by another production in November 2014 at the Singapore Airlines Theatre.

An Italian adaptation of the play premiered in Modena in 2007, in a production directed by Ferdinando Bruni and Elio De Capitani which was awarded several national awards. The same production ran for three days in Madrid in 2012.

In the fall of 2016, the Round House Theatre and Olney Theatre Center in Montgomery County, Maryland, collaborated to present a 25th anniversary production of the play, offering Parts I and II in repertory. The Washington Post's theater critic called it an "epically engrossing, acidly funny masterwork."

In April 2017, a new production began previews at the Royal National Theatre in the Lyttelton Theatre. Directed by Marianne Elliott, the cast included Andrew Garfield as Prior Walter with Russell Tovey as Joe, Denise Gough as Harper, James McArdle as Louis Ironson, Nathan Stewart-Jarrett as Belize and Nathan Lane as Roy Cohn. In April 2018, the production was nominated for six Olivier Awards, winning for Best Revival and Best Actress in a Supporting Role in a Play for Gough. The production was filmed and broadcast to cinemas around the world as part of the National Theatre Live initiative, and later released in 2021 on the company's NT at Home streaming service.

In August 2017, a new production of Millennium Approaches was brought to San Juan, Puerto Rico, by Teatro Público Inc. Directed by Benjamín Cardona, the cast featured Carlos Miranda as Roy Cohn, Jacqueline Duprey as Hannah, Gabriela Saker as Harper, and Liván Albelo as Prior. The production received critical praise and launched the new theater company.

In September 2017, a revival of the two plays were staged in Melbourne at fortyfivedownstairs for nearly a four-week run. The cast included veteran actor Helen Morse as Hannah Pitt, and Margaret Mills (who had appeared in the original Australian premiere of the play in 1994) as The Angel.

In February 2018, the 2017 Royal National Theatre production transferred to Broadway for an 18-week period at the Neil Simon Theatre. The majority of the London cast returned, with Lee Pace replacing Tovey as Joe, and Beth Malone playing the Angel at certain performances. Previews began on February 23, 2018, with opening night on March 25. The production won for Best Revival of a Play at that year's Tony Awards, with Garfield and Lane winning for Best Actor in a Play and Best Featured Actor in a Play respectively for their reprisal of their National Theatre performances, while Denise Gough and Susan Brown were nominated for Best Featured Actress in a Play. The production was recorded as an audiobook by Random House Audio, with Malone as the Angel and Bobby Canavale and Edie Falco narrating.

A critically acclaimed production opened at Berkeley Repertory Theatre in April 2018, directed by original commissioner Tony Taccone and featuring Randy Harrison as Prior, Stephen Spinella (who originated Prior Walter on Broadway) as Roy Cohn, Carmen Roman as Hannah, Benjamin T. Ismail as Louis, Danny Binstock as Joe, Bethany Jillard as Harper, Francisca Faridany and Lisa Ramirez alternating as the Angel, and Caldwell Tidicue, better known as Bob the Drag Queen, making his stage debut as Belize.

In the spring of 2023, Washington, D.C.'s Arena Stage presented Part 1, Millennium Approaches, starkly staged by Hungarian director Janos Szasz. The Washington Post's critic noted "Angels in America is back in freshly provocative, exhilarating form," particularly "the collision of seven disparate figures...who interconnect over matters political, medical, romantic — and most malignantly, through the machinations of one of them, lawyer Roy Cohn, played by Edward Gero to the toxic T." The South Australian revival of Millennium Approaches & Perestroika directed by Hayley Horton as performed at the Adelaide Little Theatre by the Adelaide Theatre Guild from 2 May 2024 - 25 May 2024. The production starred Kate Anolak as Hannah, Lee Cook as Louis, Rachel Dalton as The Angel, Brant Eustice as Roy, Matt Houston as Prior, Casmira Lorien as Harper, Eric McDowell and Belize and Lindsay Prodea as Joe with original music by Phil Short.

In October 2024, a production of the play opened at Finnish National Theatre where it had also run three decades earlier in 1994. The new production was adapted to a single four-hour play by Linda Wallgren who also directed it.

In April 2025, the International Theatre Amsterdam ensemble performed a new production of the play, remaking the 2008 version directed by ITA director Ivo van Hove. Kushner expressed his admiration for the 2008 production, called it the best iteration of the play he had seen so far. It was Hans Kesting's final role as part of the ITA ensemble.

=== Notes on Staging ===
Kushner prefers that the theatricality be transparent. In his notes about staging, he writes: "The plays benefit from a pared-down style of presentation, with scenery kept to an evocative and informative minimum. [...] I recommend rapid scene shifts (no blackouts!), employing the cast as well as stagehands in shifting the scene. This must be an actor-driven event. [...] The moments of magic [...] are to be fully imagined and realized, as wonderful theatrical illusions—which means it's OK if the wires show, and maybe it's good that they do..." Kushner is an admirer of Bertolt Brecht, who practiced a style of theatrical production whereby audiences were often reminded that they were in a theatre. The choice to have "no blackouts" allows audiences to participate in the construction of a malleable theatrical world.

One of the many theatrical devices in Angels is that each of the eight main actors has one or several other minor roles in the play. For example, the actor playing the nurse, Emily, also plays the Angel, Sister Ella Chapter (a real estate agent), and a homeless woman. This doubling and tripling of roles encourages the audience to consider the elasticity of, for example, gender and sexual identities.

== Casts ==
Characters	San Francisco	Los Angeles	London	London Revival	Broadway	London Revival	Broadway Revival
Characters	1991	1992		1993		2017	2018
Prior Walter	Stephen Spinella	Stephen Spinella	Sean Chapman	Stephen Dillane	Stephen Spinella	Andrew Garfield	Andrew Garfield
Louis Ironson	Michael Ornstein	Joe Mantello	Marcus D'Amico	Jason Isaacs	Joe Mantello	James McArdle	James McArdle
Joe Pitt	Michael Scott Ryan	Jeffrey King	Nick Reding	Daniel Craig	David Marshall Grant	Russell Tovey	Lee Pace
Harper Pitt	Anne Darragh	Cynthia Mace	Felicity Montagu	Clare Holman	Marcia Gay Harden	Denise Gough	Denise Gough
Roy Cohn	John Bellucci	Ron Leibman	Henry Goodman	David Schofield	Ron Leibman	Nathan Lane	Nathan Lane
Belize	Harry Waters Jr.	K. Todd Freeman	Joseph Mydell	Joseph Mydell	Jeffrey Wright	Nathan Stewart-Jarrett	Nathan Stewart-Jarrett
The Angel	Ellen McLaughlin	Ellen McLaughlin	Nancy Crane	Nancy Crane	Ellen McLaughlin	Amanda Lawrence	Amanda Lawrence
Hannah Pitt	Kathleen Chalfant	Kathleen Chalfant	Rosemary Martin	Susan Engel	Kathleen Chalfant	Susan Brown	Susan Brown

== Adaptations ==
=== HBO miniseries ===
In 2003, HBO Films created a miniseries adaptation of the play. Kushner adapted his original text for the screen, and Mike Nichols directed. HBO broadcast the film in various formats: three-hour segments that correspond to Millennium Approaches and Perestroika, as well as one-hour "chapters" that roughly correspond to an act or two of each of these plays. The first three chapters were initially broadcast on December 7, to international acclaim, with the final three chapters following. Angels in America was the most watched made-for-cable film in 2003 and won both the Golden Globe and Emmy for Best Limited Series.

Kushner made certain changes to his play (especially Part Two, Perestroika) for it to work on screen, but the HBO adaptation is generally a faithful representation of Kushner's original work. Kushner has been quoted as saying that he knew Nichols was the right person to direct the film when, at their first meeting, Nichols immediately said that he wanted actors to play multiple roles, as had been done in stage productions.

The main cast consists of Al Pacino, Meryl Streep, Emma Thompson, Jeffrey Wright (reprising his Tony-winning Broadway role), Justin Kirk, Ben Shenkman, Patrick Wilson, and Mary-Louise Parker.

=== Opera ===
Angels in America – The Opera made its world premiere at the Théâtre du Châtelet in Paris, France, on November 23, 2004. The opera was based on both parts of the Angels in America fantasia, however the script was re-worked and condensed to fit both parts into a two and half hour show. Composer Peter Eötvös explains: "In the opera version, I put less emphasis on the political line than Kushner...I rather focus on the passionate relationships, on the highly dramatic suspense of the wonderful text, on the permanently uncertain state of the visions." A German version of the opera followed suit in mid-2005. The opera made its US debut in June 2006 at the Stanford Calderwood Pavilion in Boston, Massachusetts.

=== Music ===
The text of Prior Walter's monologue from Act 5, Scene 5 of Perestroika was set to music by Michael Shaieb for a 2009 festival celebrating Kushner's work at the Guthrie Theater. The work was commissioned by the Twin Cities Gay Men's Chorus, which had commissioned Shaieb's Through A Glass, Darkly in 2008. The work premiered at the Guthrie in April 2009.

== Reception and legacy ==
=== Critical response ===
Angels in America received numerous awards, including the 1993 and 1994 Tony Awards for Best Play. The play's first part, Millennium Approaches, received the 1993 Pulitzer Prize for Drama.

The play garnered much praise upon its release for its dialogue and exploration of social issues. "Mr. Kushner has written the most thrilling American play in years," wrote The New York Times. It is the final work critic Harold Bloom listed in his Western Canon list.

In an essay titled "Angles in America", the cultural critic Lee Siegel wrote in The New Republic, "Angels in America is a second-rate play written by a second-rate playwright who happens to be gay, and because he has written a play about being gay, and about AIDS, no one—and I mean no one—is going to call Angels in America the overwrought, coarse, posturing, formulaic mess that it is." In his 1995 book Homos, literary critic and queer theorist Leo Bersani called Angels in America a "muddled and pretentious play", "[whose] enormous success [...] is a sign, if we need still another one, of how ready and anxious America is to see and hear about gays—provided we reassure America how familiar, how morally sincere, and, particularly in the case of Kushner's work, how innocuously full of significance we can be."

=== Controversy ===
In response to the frank treatment of homosexuality and AIDS, and brief male nudity, the play quickly became subject to controversial reaction from conservative and religious groups, sometimes labelled as being part of the "culture war". In Charlotte, North Carolina, in 1996, there were protests held outside a production of the play by the Charlotte Repertory Theatre at the North Carolina Blumenthal Performing Arts Center. This led to funding cuts for the Arts & Science Council of Charlotte, the city's arts funding agency, in the following year. A 1999 production at Kilgore College, a community college in Kilgore, Texas, sparked protests from area and national homophobic groups and led to the town's mayor and commissioners pulling funds for the Texas Shakespeare Festival, which the production's director also ran. Kushner wrote a letter of support to the cast and crew, and the production did go forward.

=== Legacy and retrospective lists ===
A decade after the play's premiere, Metro Weekly labeled it "one of the most important pieces of theater to come out of the late 20th century."

Numerous publications have since named Angels in America one of the greatest plays of the 20th century and of all time. (Note: Attributed to multiple sources.)

== Awards and nominations ==
=== Millennium Approaches ===
Year	Award	Category	Nominee	Result
1990	Kennedy Center Fund for New American Plays			Non-competitive
1991	Bay Area Drama Critics Award	Best Play		Won
1991	National Arts Club	Joseph Kesselring Award		Won
1992	Laurence Olivier Award	Play of the Year		Nominated
1992	Laurence Olivier Award	Actor of the Year	Marcus D'Amico	Nominated
1992	Laurence Olivier Award	Best Actor in a Supporting Role	Henry Goodman	Nominated
1992	Laurence Olivier Award	Best Director of a Play	Declan Donnellan	Nominated
1992	Evening Standard Theatre Award	Best Play	Tony Kushner	Won
1992	Critics' Circle Theatre Award	Best New Play		Won
1993	Tony Awards	Best Play		Won
1993	Tony Awards	Best Actor in a Play	Ron Leibman	Won
1993	Tony Awards	Best Featured Actor in a Play	Stephen Spinella	Won
1993	Tony Awards	Best Featured Actor in a Play	Joe Mantello	Nominated
1993	Tony Awards	Best Featured Actress in a Play	Kathleen Chalfant	Nominated
1993	Tony Awards	Best Featured Actress in a Play	Marcia Gay Harden	Nominated
1993	Tony Awards	Best Direction of a Play	George C. Wolfe	Won
1993	Tony Awards	Best Scenic Design in a Play	Robin Wagner	Nominated
1993	Tony Awards	Best Lighting Design	Jules Fisher	Nominated
1993	Drama Desk Award	Best Play		Won
1993	Drama Desk Award	Outstanding Actor in a Play	Ron Leibman	Won
1993	Drama Desk Award	Outstanding Featured Actor in a Play	Stephen Spinella	Won
1993	Drama Desk Award	Outstanding Featured Actor in a Play	Joe Mantello	Won
1993	Drama Desk Award	Outstanding Featured Actor in a Play	David Marshall Grant	Nominated
1993	Drama Desk Award	Outstanding Featured Actress in a Play	Kathleen Chalfant	Nominated
1993	Drama Desk Award	Outstanding Featured Actress in a Play	Marcia Gay Harden	Nominated
1993	Drama Desk Award	Outstanding Director of a Play	George C. Wolfe	Won
1993	Drama Desk Award	Outstanding Lighting Design	Jules Fisher	Nominated
1993	New York Drama Critics' Circle Award	Best Play		Won
1993	Pulitzer Prize for Drama			Won

=== Perestroika ===
Year	Award	Category	Nominee	Result
1992	Los Angeles Drama Critics Circle Award	Best New Play		Won
1994	Tony Award	Best Play		Won
1994	Tony Award	Best Actor in a Play	Stephen Spinella	Won
1994	Tony Award	Best Featured Actor in a Play	Jeffrey Wright	Won
1994	Tony Award	Best Featured Actor in a Play	David Marshall Grant	Nominated
1994	Tony Award	Best Direction of a Play	George C. Wolfe	Nominated
1994	Tony Award	Best Lighting Design	Jules Fisher	Nominated
1994	Laurence Olivier Award	Play of the Year		Nominated
1994	Laurence Olivier Award	Best Actor in a Supporting Role	Joseph Mydell	Won
1994	Drama Desk Award	Best Play		Won
1994	Drama Desk Award	Outstanding Actor in a Play	Stephen Spinella	Won
1994	Drama Desk Award	Outstanding Actress in a Play	Kathleen Chalfant	Nominated
1994	Drama Desk Award	Outstanding Featured Actor in a Play	Jeffrey Wright	Won
1994	Drama Desk Award	Outstanding Featured Actor in a Play	Ron Leibman	Nominated
1994	Drama Desk Award	Outstanding Featured Actress in a Play	Marcia Gay Harden	Nominated
1994	New York Drama Critics' Circle Award	Best Play		Runner-up

=== Angels in America ===
Year	Award	Category	Nominee	Result
1994	Outer Critics Circle Award	Best Broadway Play		Won
1994	Outer Critics Circle Award	Best Director of a Play	George C. Wolfe	Won
1994	Outer Critics Circle Award	Best Debut Performance	Jeffrey Wright	Won
2017	Evening Standard Theatre Award	Best Actor	Andrew Garfield	Won
2018	Laurence Olivier Award	Best Revival		Won
2018	Laurence Olivier Award	Best Actor	Andrew Garfield	Nominated
2018	Laurence Olivier Award	Best Actor in a Supporting Role	James McArdle	Nominated
2018	Laurence Olivier Award	Best Actress in a Supporting Role	Denise Gough	Won
2018	Laurence Olivier Award	Best Director	Marianne Elliott	Nominated
2018	Laurence Olivier Award	Best Lighting Design	Paule Constable	Nominated
2018	Tony Award	Best Revival of a Play		Won
2018	Tony Award	Best Actor in a Play	Andrew Garfield	Won
2018	Tony Award	Best Featured Actor in a Play	Nathan Lane	Won
2018	Tony Award	Best Featured Actress in a Play	Susan Brown	Nominated
2018	Tony Award	Best Featured Actress in a Play	Denise Gough	Nominated
2018	Tony Award	Best Direction of a Play	Marianne Elliott	Nominated
2018	Tony Award	Best Original Score	Adrian Sutton	Nominated
2018	Tony Award	Best Scenic Design of a Play	Ian MacNeil and Edward Pierce	Nominated
2018	Tony Award	Best Costume Design of a Play	Nicky Gillibrand	Nominated
2018	Tony Award	Best Lighting Design of a Play	Paule Constable	Nominated
2018	Tony Award	Best Sound Design of a Play	Ian Dickinson	Nominated
2018	Drama Desk Award	Revival of a Play		Won
2018	Drama Desk Award	Outstanding Actor in a Play	Andrew Garfield	Won
2018	Drama Desk Award	Outstanding Actor in a Play	James McArdle	Nominated
2018	Drama Desk Award	Outstanding Featured Actor in a Play	Nathan Lane	Won
2018	Drama Desk Award	Outstanding Director of a Play	Marianne Elliott	Nominated
2018	Drama Desk Award	Music in a Play	Adrian Sutton	Nominated
2018	Drama Desk Award	Outstanding Puppet Design	Finn Caldwell and Nick Barnes	Nominated
2018	Outer Critics Circle Award	Outstanding Revival of a Play (Broadway or Off-Broadway)		Won
2018	Outer Critics Circle Award	Outstanding Actor in a Play	Andrew Garfield	Won
2018	Outer Critics Circle Award	Outstanding Featured Actor in a Play	Nathan Lane	Won
2018	Outer Critics Circle Award	Outstanding Featured Actress in a Play	Denise Gough	Nominated
2018	Outer Critics Circle Award	Outstanding Director of a Play	Marianne Elliott	Nominated
2018	Outer Critics Circle Award	Outstanding Lighting Design (Play or Musical)	Paule Constable	Nominated
2018	Drama League Award	Outstanding Revival of a Broadway or Off-Broadway Play		Won
2018	Drama League Award	Distinguished Performance Award	Andrew Garfield	Nominated
2020	Audie Audiobook Award	Best Audio Drama		Won

== See also ==
- Art of the AIDS Crisis
- List of American plays
- The World Only Spins Forward: The Ascent of Angels in America – an oral history of the play
