= Laurence Olivier Award for Best Revival =

Annual award for London theatre

- Awarded for: Best Revival
- Location: England
- Presented by: Society of London Theatre
- First award: 1991
- Currently held by: All My Sons (2026)
- Website: officiallondontheatre.com/olivier-awards/

The Laurence Olivier Award for Best Revival is an annual award presented by the Society of London Theatre in recognition of the "world-class status of London theatre." The awards were established as the Society of West End Theatre Awards in 1976, and renamed in 1984 in honour of English actor and director Laurence Olivier.

This award was introduced in 1991, presented through to 1995, set aside from 1996 to 2002, and reintroduced for the 2003 Olivier Awards.

== Winners and nominees ==
=== 1990s ===
| Year | Play | Writer | Director |
1991
| 1991 | Pericles | William Shakespeare | David Thacker |
| 1991 | Accidental Death of an Anarchist | Dario Fo | Tim Supple |
| 1991 | Kean | Jean-Paul Sartre, Alexandre Dumas, père and Frank Hauser | Sam Mendes |
| 1991 | The Wild Duck | Henrik Ibsen | Peter Hall |
1992
| 1992 | Hedda Gabler | Henrik Ibsen | Deborah Warner |
| 1992 | Faith Healer | Brian Friel | Joe Dowling |
| 1992 | The Comedy of Errors | William Shakespeare | Ian Judge |
| 1992 | Uncle Vanya | Anton Chekhov | Sean Mathias |
1993
| 1993 | An Inspector Calls | J.B. Priestley | Stephen Daldry |
| 1993 | Heartbreak House | George Bernard Shaw | Trevor Nunn |
| 1993 | Henry IV, Part 1 and Part 2 | William Shakespeare | Adrian Noble |
| 1993 | No Man's Land | Harold Pinter | David Leveaux |
1994
| 1994 | Machinal | Sophie Treadwell | Stephen Daldry |
| 1994 | Medea | Euripides and Alistair Elliot | Jonathan Kent |
| 1994 | The Deep Blue Sea | Terence Rattigan | Karel Reisz |
| 1994 | The Winter's Tale | William Shakespeare | Adrian Noble |
1995
| 1995 | As You Like It | William Shakespeare | Declan Donellan |
| 1995 | Le Cid | Pierre Corneille and Ranjit Bolt | Jonathan Kent |
| 1995 | Les Parents terribles | Jean Cocteau and Jeremy Sams | Sean Mathias |
| 1995 | Sweet Bird of Youth | Tennessee Williams | Richard Eyre |

=== 2000s ===
| Year | Play | Writer | Director |
|---|---|---|---|
| 2003 | | | |
| 2003 | Twelfth Night | William Shakespeare | Tim Carroll |
| 2003 | Uncle Vanya | Anton Chekhov | Sam Mendes |
| 2003 | Abigail's Party | Mike Leigh | David Grindley |
| 2003 | A Streetcar Named Desire | Tennessee Williams | Trevor Nunn |
2004
| 2004 | Mourning Becomes Electra | Eugene O’Neill | Howard Davies |
| 2004 | Absolutely! (Perhaps) | Luigi Pirandello and Martin Sherman | Franco Zeffirelli |
| 2004 | Caligula | Albert Camus and David Greig | Michael Grandage |
| 2004 | Of Mice and Men | John Steinbeck | Jonathan Church |
2005
| 2005 | Hamlet | William Shakespeare | Trevor Nunn |
| 2005 | All's Well That Ends Well | William Shakespeare | Gregory Doran |
| 2005 | Endgame | Samuel Beckett | Matthew Warchus |
| 2005 | Journey's End | R. C. Sherriff | David Grindley |
2006
| 2006 | Hedda Gabler | Henrik Ibsen and Richard Eyre | Richard Eyre |
| 2006 | Death of a Salesman | Arthur Miller | Robert Falls |
| 2006 | Don Carlos | Friedrich Schiller and Mike Poulton | Michael Grandage |
| 2006 | Mary Stuart | Friedrich Schiller and Peter Oswald | Phyllida Lloyd |
2007
| 2007 | The Crucible | Arthur Miller | Dominic Cooke |
| 2007 | Donkey's Years | Michael Frayn | Jeremy Sams |
| 2007 | A Moon for the Misbegotten | Eugene O'Neill | Howard Davies |
| 2007 | Who's Afraid of Virginia Woolf? | Edward Albee | Anthony Page |
2008
| 2008 | Saint Joan | George Bernard Shaw | Marianne Elliott |
| 2008 | Boeing Boeing | Marc Camoletti and Beverley Cross | Matthew Warchus |
| 2008 | Dealer's Choice | Patrick Marber | Samuel West |
| 2008 | Macbeth | William Shakespeare | Rupert Goold |
| 2008 | The Seagull | Anton Chekhov and Christopher Hampton | Ian Rickson |
2009
| 2009 | The Histories | William Shakespeare | Michael Boyd |
| 2009 | The Chalk Garden | Enid Bagnold | Michael Grandage |
| 2009 | The Norman Conquests | Alan Ayckbourn | Matthew Warchus |

=== 2010s ===
| Year | Play | Writer | Director |
2010
| 2010 | Cat on a Hot Tin Roof | Tennessee Williams | Debbie Allen |
| 2010 | Arcadia | Tom Stoppard | David Leveaux |
| 2010 | The Misanthrope | Molière | Thea Sharrock |
| 2010 | A Streetcar Named Desire | Tennessee Williams | Rob Ashford |
| 2010 | Three Days of Rain | Richard Greenberg | Jamie Lloyd |
| 2010 | A View from the Bridge | Arthur Miller | Lindsay Posner |
2011
| 2011 | After the Dance | Terence Rattigan | Thea Sharrock |
| 2011 | All My Sons | Arthur Miller | Howard Davies |
| 2011 | King Lear | William Shakespeare | Michael Grandage |
| 2011 | When We Are Married | J. B. Priestley | Christopher Luscombe |
2012
| 2012 | Anna Christie | Eugene O'Neill | Rob Ashford |
| 2012 | Flare Path | Terence Rattigan | Trevor Nunn |
| 2012 | Much Ado About Nothing | William Shakespeare | Josie Rourke |
| 2012 | Noises Off | Michael Frayn | Lindsay Posner |
2013
| 2013 | Long Day's Journey Into Night | Eugene O'Neill | Anthony Page |
| 2013 | Macbeth | William Shakespeare | Jamie Lloyd |
| 2013 | Old Times | Harold Pinter | Ian Rickson |
| 2013 | Twelfth Night | William Shakespeare | Tim Carroll |
2014
| 2014 | Ghosts | Henrik Ibsen | Richard Eyre |
| 2014 | The Amen Corner | James Baldwin | Rufus Norris |
| 2014 | Othello | William Shakespeare | Nicholas Hytner |
| 2014 | Private Lives | Noël Coward | Jonathan Kent |
2015
| 2015 | A View from the Bridge | Arthur Miller | Ivo van Hove |
| 2015 | A Streetcar Named Desire | Tennessee Williams | Benedict Andrews |
| 2015 | My Night with Reg | Kevin Elyot | Robert Hastie |
| 2015 | Skylight | David Hare | Stephen Daldry |
| 2015 | The Crucible | Arthur Miller | Yael Farber |
2016
| 2016 | Ma Rainey's Black Bottom | August Wilson | Dominic Cooke |
| 2016 | Hamlet | William Shakespeare | Simon Godwin |
| 2016 | Les Liaisons dangereuses | Pierre Choderlos de Laclos | Josie Rourke |
| 2016 | The Winter's Tale | William Shakespeare | Kenneth Branagh & Rob Ashford |
2017
| 2017 | Yerma | Federico García Lorca | Simon Stone |
| 2017 | The Glass Menagerie | Tennessee Williams | John Tiffany |
| 2017 | This House | James Graham | Jeremy Herrin |
| 2017 | Travesties | Tom Stoppard | Patrick Marber |
2018
| 2018 | Angels in America | Tony Kushner | Marianne Elliott |
| 2018 | Hamlet | William Shakespeare | Robert Icke |
| 2018 | Who's Afraid of Virginia Woolf? | Edward Albee | James Macdonald |
| 2018 | Witness for the Prosecution | Agatha Christie | Lucy Bailey |
2019
| 2019 | Summer and Smoke | Tennessee Williams | Rebecca Frecknall |
| 2019 | King Lear | William Shakespeare | Jonathan Munby |
| 2019 | The Lieutenant of Inishmore | Martin McDonagh | Michael Grandage |
| 2019 | The Price | Arthur Miller | Jonathan Church |

=== 2020s ===
| Year | Play | Writer | Director |
2020
| 2020 | Cyrano de Bergerac | Edmond Rostand | Jamie Lloyd |
| 2020 | Death of a Salesman | Arthur Miller | Marianne Elliott & Miranda Cromwell |
| 2020 | Present Laughter | Noël Coward | Matthew Warchus |
| 2020 | Rosmersholm | Henrik Ibsen | Ian Rickson |
| 2021 | Not presented due to extended closing of theatre productions during COVID-19 pandemic (Note: Due to late March 2020 to late July 2021 closing of London theatre productions during the COVID-19 pandemic in England, the 2022 awards recognise productions that launched anytime from February 2020 to February 2022) | | |
2022
| 2022 | Constellations | Nick Payne | Michael Longhurst |
| 2022 | A Number | Caryl Churchill | Lyndsey Turner |
| 2022 | The Normal Heart | Larry Kramer | Dominic Cooke |
| 2022 | The Tragedy of Macbeth | William Shakespeare | Yael Farber |
2023
| 2023 | A Streetcar Named Desire | Tennessee Williams | Rebecca Frecknall |
| 2023 | The Crucible | Arthur Miller | Lyndsey Turner |
| 2023 | Good | Cecil Philip Taylor | Dominic Cooke |
| 2023 | Jerusalem | Jez Butterworth | Ian Rickson |
2024
| 2024 | Vanya | Anton Chekhov; adapted by Simon Stephens | Sam Yates |
| 2024 | The Effect | Lucy Prebble | Jamie Lloyd |
| 2024 | Macbeth | William Shakespeare | Max Webster |
| 2024 | Shirley Valentine | Willy Russell | Matthew Dunster |
2025
| 2025 | Oedipus | Sophocles, Robert Icke | Robert Icke |
| 2025 | The Importance of Being Earnest | Oscar Wilde | Max Webster |
| 2025 | Machinal | Sophie Treadwell | Richard Jones |
| 2025 | Waiting for Godot | Samuel Beckett | James Macdonald |
| 2026 | | | |
| 2026 | All My Sons | Arthur Miller | Ivo van Hove |
| 2026 | Arcadia | Tom Stoppard | Carrie Cracknell |
| 2026 | Much Ado About Nothing | William Shakespeare | Jamie Lloyd |
| 2026 | The Seagull | Anton Chekhov | Thomas Ostermeier |

== Multiple awards and nominations ==
=== Awards ===
2 awards

- Hedda Gabler

=== Nominations ===
4 nominations

- A Streetcar Named Desire
- Macbeth

3 nominations

- The Crucible
- Hamlet
- Uncle Vanya

2 nominations

- Death of a Salesman
- Hedda Gabler
- King Lear
- Machinal
- Twelfth Night
- A View from the Bridge
- Who's Afraid of Virginia Woolf?
- The Winter's Tale

== See also ==
- Tony Award for Best Revival of a Play
