= Marianne Elliott =

British theatre director (born 1966)

Marianne Elliott OBE
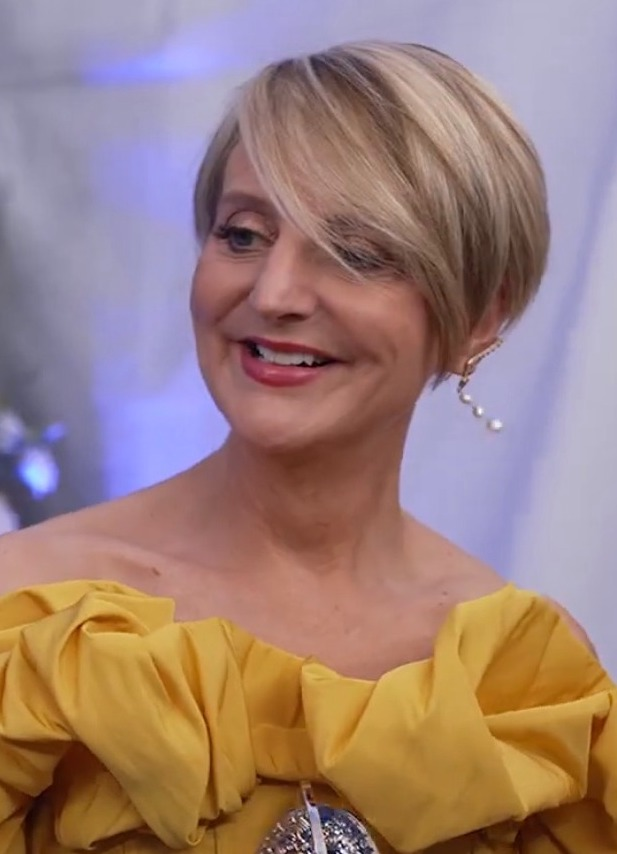
- Elliott in 2022
- Born: Marianne Phoebe Elliott; 27 December 1966 (age 59); London, England
- Education: Hull University
- Occupations: Theatre director and producer
- Spouse: Nick Sidi (m. 2002)
- Children: 1
- Parents: Michael Elliott (father); Rosalind Knight (mother)

Marianne Phoebe Elliott OBE (born 27 December 1966) is a British theatre director and producer. Known for her works in the West End and on Broadway, she has received numerous accolades including two Laurence Olivier Awards and five Tony Awards.

Initially determined not to go into theatre, Elliott began working at the Royal Exchange, Manchester eventually becoming an Associate Director of the Royal Court Theatre in London in 2002. Known for her extensive work at the Royal National Theatre from 2006 to 2017, she established her own theatre production company with producer Chris Harper in 2016. She has received critical and box-office success directing original West End productions of War Horse in 2007 and The Curious Incident of the Dog in the Night-Time in 2012, as well as revivals of Tony Kushner's Angels in America in 2017, Stephen Sondheim's musical Company in 2018, and Arthur Miller's Death of a Salesman in 2019, all of which transferred to Broadway. She made her feature film directorial debut with the biographical film The Salt Path in 2024.

Elliott was appointed Officer of the Order of the British Empire (OBE) in Queen Elizabeth II's 2018 Birthday Honours for services to theatre.

== Early life and education ==
Elliott was born in 1966 in London, the daughter of Michael Elliott, theatre director and co-founder of the Royal Exchange theatre in Manchester, and actress Rosalind Knight. Her maternal grandfather was the actor Esmond Knight. The family moved to Manchester when she was eight years old and she attended St Hilary's School, Alderley Edge, Didsbury Road Junior School in Heaton Moor and later Stockport Grammar School.

She has said she "hated" the theatrical professions as a child "and used to ask [her parents] not to talk shop". Despite this early ambivalence, she studied drama at Hull University, but used "to sneak into English lectures because she found them more interesting".

Elliott's father, Michael, died when she was a teenager. She said "I don’t think I would have gone into the theatre at all if my father had lived because he was so good at it. I didn’t make the decision to direct until I was in my late 20s, a good 10 years after he died."

== Career ==
After leaving university Elliott was, initially, determined not to go into the theatre and had a number of different jobs including casting director and drama secretary at Granada Television. It was an assistant director role at Regent's Park that first moved her in the direction of a theatrical career.

=== Royal Exchange, Manchester (1995–2002) ===
In 1995 she began to work at the Royal Exchange, where her father had been a founding artistic director. She was nurtured by Greg Hersov, who she has described as her "biggest influence", and she worked her way up including being appointed artistic director in 1998. In her own estimation, two stand-out productions from that period were a 2000 As You Like It and the world premiere of Simon Stephens' play Port.

=== Royal Court Theatre, London (2002–2006) ===
In 2002 Elliott's career saw her move from Manchester to London, when she was invited by Artistic Director Ian Rickson to become an associate director of the Royal Court Theatre. During this time, Elliott's productions included Notes on Falling Leaves by Ayub Khan Din, The Sugar Syndrome by Lucy Prebble, Stoning Mary by Debbie Tucker Green and Local as well as many new writing workshops and play readings.

=== Royal National Theatre (2006–2017) ===
In 2006, she was invited by Nicholas Hytner, who Elliott has said "seemed to value [her] talent more highly than I did" to make her National Theatre debut with Ibsen's Pillars of the Community, which led to her being invited back to direct Saint Joan, starring Anne-Marie Duff, which won the Olivier Award for Best Revival in 2008. She became an associate director under Hytner, and directed a series of important, influential and highly successful productions including War Horse and The Curious Incident of the Dog in the Night-Time. She left the National Theatre in 2017.

=== Critical acclaim and feature film directorial debut (2016–2024) ===
In 2016, Elliott teamed up with theatre producer Chris Harper to set up theatre company Elliott & Harper Productions. Its first production was the West End premiere of Heisenberg by Simon Stephens, directed by Elliott at the Wyndham's Theatre (3 October 2017 – 6 January 2018) which garnered mixed reviews and poor houses; an inauspicious start to the collaboration. Elliott & Harper became co-producers of the National Theatre's Broadway transfer of Angels in America which opened in March 2018, also directed by Elliott.

The company produced the second West End revival of Company, in which Bobbie was played by a woman. It opened at the Gielgud Theatre in September 2018 and the cast included Rosalie Craig as Bobbie, Patti LuPone as Joanne, Mel Giedroyc as Sarah and Jonathan Bailey as Jamie (originally a woman named Amy). Elliott commented that Stephen Sondheim "didn’t like the idea at first, but he agreed to let me workshop it in London. We filmed part of it and sent it to him in New York, and he said he loved it. He has agreed to the odd lyric change, but essentially I’m hoping to tweak it as little as possible. Reviving Company 47 years on, I think it actually makes more sense for Bobbie to be a woman."

"When I was auditioning in London, I couldn't find the person [to play Amy]. I also felt like this woman wasn't now, wasn't a very modern woman. So then I did a crazy thing — I asked a friend of mine, Jonathan Bailey... 'Would you mind just coming in and trying something for me? It's a bit crazy.' We worked for maybe an hour and a half, and it wasn't perfect, but I felt (gasp), this is exciting, there's a potential here. So I then immediately got on the email to Steve, and I said, 'Steve, you have to be sitting down. You have to be having a glass of wine in your hand. And take a deep breath, but I'm going to say something to you: I think possibly we should change Amy into a man.' And Steve's reply sums him up, really, as a collaborator. He basically said, 'Marianne, you need to be sitting down, you need to have a glass of wine in your hand, you need to take a deep breath: I think it's a great idea.'"

— Elliott on recreating Jamie, one of the gender-swapped characters in the 2018 West End production of Company

In 2018, Elliott's first episode of Desert Island Discs aired on BBC Radio 4, presented by Kirsty Young.

Elliott & Harper have also produced a new adaptation of C. S. Lewis's The Lion, the Witch and the Wardrobe with Catherine Schreiber and West Yorkshire Playhouse. Directed by Sally Cookson, it ran at the West Yorkshire Playhouse until 27 January 2018 and transferred to the Bridge Theatre in London for Christmas 2019. It is due to go on a UK tour in Christmas 2021. In 2019, Elliott co-directed Death of a Salesman alongside Miranda Cromwell, which starred Wendell Pierce and Sharon D. Clarke at the Young Vic Theatre with an all-black Loman family. In autumn 2019, the production transferred to the Piccadilly Theatre and performed to rave reviews and sold-out audiences, despite the ceiling collapse at the Piccadilly Theatre in November 2019.

In March 2020, Elliott's Olivier-award-winning production of Company opened in previews at the Bernard Jacobs Theatre on Broadway and was set to officially open on Stephen Sondheim's 90th birthday. The production was forced to close along with the rest of Broadway after just 12 previews as a result of the spread of COVID-19. The revival ultimately opened December 9, 2021.

Elliott directed Tamsin Greig and Harriet Walter in the new version of Talking Heads by Alan Bennett for the BBC in 2020.

In 2022, the company produced the West End revival of Cock by Mike Bartlett starring Jonathan Bailey at the Ambassadors Theatre for a strictly limited run. The acclaimed production reunited Elliott and Bailey who she previously directed in Company at the West End. The Observer's Kate Kellaway called it an "immaculate production," with The Arts Desk writing that it was "brutal, bruising, and brilliant." In 2024, Elliott ended her joint production company venture with Chris Harper.

Elliott made her feature film directorial debut with the film The Salt Path starring Gillian Anderson and Jason Isaacs. The film had its world premiere as part of the Special Presentations lineup at the 2024 Toronto International Film Festival on 5 September 2024. The same year, Elliott ended her joint production company venture with Chris Harper.

=== Established director (2025–present) ===
In the summer of 2027, Elliott will direct Stephen Sondheim's Sunday in the Park with George at the Barbican Theatre. Jonathan Bailey and Ariana Grande were announced to star but both withdrew for personal reasons. In winter 2027, Elliott will co-direct with Miranda Cromwell a revival of Leonard Bernstein, Arthur Laurents and Stephen Sondheim's West Side Story in the Olivier Theatre at the National Theatre, featuring its original choreography by Jerome Robbins, reproduced and adapted by Julio Monge.

== Key collaborations ==
Elliott has established creative relationships with actors and theatre creatives through the years:

- Jonathan Bailey in Company, originating the gender-swapped role of Jamie that won the actor a Laurence Olivier Award for Best Actor in a Supporting Role in a Musical in 2019 and the acclaimed West End revival of Cock in 2022. He was also announced for Sunday in the Park with George at the Barbican Theatre in 2027, but withdrew.
- Rosalie Craig in The Light Princess in 2013 and Company in 2018; Craig received nominations for a Laurence Olivier Award for Best Actress in a Musical for both roles
- Anne-Marie Duff in Saint Joan in 2007 where she was nominated for a Laurence Olivier Award for Best Actress, and Husbands & Sons in 2015
- Simon Stephens, the British playwright, spoke of her as having "an innate sense of democracy. She combines a fearlessly theatrical imagination with a real concern for her audience. [Curious Incident] has to be a piece of theatre you can come to if you’re 10 or if you’re 90. Marianne and the rest of the artistic team were completely committed to trying to get inside Christopher’s head and dramatise his world from within."
- Bunny Christie, set designer for The Curious Incident of the Dog in the Night-Time and Company
- Miranda Cromwell, co-director of Death of a Salesman in 2019 and West Side Story in 2027.

== Personal life ==
Elliott married the actor Nick Sidi in 2002, they have one daughter.

== Selected works ==
=== West End theatre ===
- I Have Been Here Before by J B Priestley at the Royal Exchange, Manchester with David Horovitch and George Costigan (1996)
- Poor Super Man by Brad Fraser. British premiere at the Royal Exchange, Manchester (MEN Award) with Sam Graham (MEN Award) and Luke Williams (MEN Award) (1997)
- The Deep Blue Sea by Terence Rattigan at the Royal Exchange, Manchester with Susan Wooldridge and David Fielder (1997)
- Martin Yesterday by Brad Fraser. European premiere at the Royal Exchange, Manchester with Ian Gelder and Ben Daniels (1999)
- Nude With Violin by Noël Coward at the Royal Exchange, Manchester with Derek Griffiths, John Bennett and Rosalind Knight (1999)
- A Woman of No Importance by Oscar Wilde at the Royal Exchange, Manchester with Gaye Brown (2000)
- As You Like It at the Royal Exchange, Manchester with Claire Price, Tristan Sturrock, Jonathan Slinger, Fenella Woolgar and Peter Guinness (2000)
- Les Blancs by Lorraine Hansberry. Directed by Greg Hersov and Marianne Elliott with Paterson Joseph (2001)
- The Little Foxes by Lillian Hellman at the Donmar Warehouse with Penelope Wilton, David Calder, Peter Guinness and Matthew Marsh (2001)
- Design for Living by Noël Coward at the Royal Exchange, Manchester with Victoria Scarborough, Ken Bones and Oliver Milburn (2002)
- Port by Simon Stephens (Pearson Award). World premiere at the Royal Exchange, Manchester with Emma Lowndes (MEN Award) and Andrew Sheridan (2002)
- The Sugar Syndrome by Lucy Prebble (2003)
- Notes on Falling Leaves by Ayub Khan Din (2004)
- Stoning Mary by Debbie Tucker Green (2005)
- Pillars of the Community by Henrik Ibsen at the National Theatre with Damian Lewis, Lesley Manville and Joseph Millson (2005)
- Therese Raquin adapted by Nicholas Wright at the National Theatre with Charlotte Emerson, Ben Daniels, Patrick Kennedy and Judy Parfitt (2006)
- Saint Joan by George Bernard Shaw at the National Theatre with Anne-Marie Duff (Evening Standard Award), Angus Wright, Michael Thomas and Paterson Joseph (2007)
- War Horse adapted by Nick Stafford (co-directed with Tom Morris) at the National Theatre with Angus Wright with Bronagh Gallagher, Patrick O'Kane and Alan Williams (2007)
- Harper Regan by Simon Stephens at the National Theatre with Lesley Sharp and Michael Mears (2008)
- Mrs Affleck by Samuel Adamson at the National Theatre with Claire Skinner and Angus Wright (2009)
- Women Beware Women by Thomas Middleton at the National Theatre with Harriet Walter and Raymond Coulthard (2009)
- All's Well That Ends Well by William Shakespeare at the National Theatre with Michelle Terry, Clare Higgins, Oliver Ford Davies, Conleth Hill and George Rainsford (2009)
- Season's Greetings by Alan Ayckbourn at the National Theatre with Oliver Chris, Mark Gatiss, Catherine Tate and David Troughton (2010)
- The Curious Incident of the Dog in the Night-Time at the National Theatre with Luke Treadaway, Nicola Walker and Niamh Cusack (2012)
- The Light Princess by George MacDonald adaptation by Samuel Adamson and lyrics and music by Tori Amos at the National Theatre (2013)
- Husbands & Sons by D. H. Lawrence. A co-production between the National Theatre and the Royal Exchange with Anne-Marie Duff (2015)
- Angels in America by Tony Kushner at the National Theatre with Nathan Lane and Andrew Garfield (2017)
- Company by Stephen Sondheim at the Gielgud Theatre with Rosalie Craig, Patti LuPone, Jonathan Bailey and Mel Giedroyc (2018)
- Death of a Salesman by Arthur Miller co-directed with Miranda Cromwell at the Young Vic Theatre and Piccadilly Theatre, starring Wendell Pierce and Sharon D. Clarke (2019)
- Cock by Mike Bartlett at the Ambassadors Theatre with Jonathan Bailey (2022)
- Les Liaisons Dangereuses by Christopher Hampton at the Royal National Theatre starring Aidan Turner and Lesley Manville (2026)
- Who's Afraid of Virginia Woolf? by Edward Albee at @sohoplace starring Gillian Anderson and Billy Crudup (2026)
- West Side Story by Leonard Bernstein, Stephen Sondheim and Arthur Laurents co-directed with Miranda Cromwell at the National Theatre (2027)

=== Broadway theatre ===
- War Horse by Nick Stafford based on Michael Morpurgo's book at the Vivian Beaumont Theatre on Broadway (2011)
- The Curious Incident of the Dog in the Night-Time by Simon Stephens at the Ethel Barrymore Theatre with Alex Sharp (2015)
- Angels in America by Tony Kushner at Neil Simon Theatre on Broadway with Andrew Garfield and Nathan Lane (2018)
- Company by Stephen Sondheim at the Bernard B. Jacobs Theatre on Broadway with Katrina Lenk and Patti Lupone (previews 2020, opening delayed to 2021 due to COVID-19)
- Death of a Salesman by Arthur Miller at the Hudson Theatre on Broadway with Wendell Pierce and Sharon D. Clarke (2022) (producer only)

=== Film ===
- The Salt Path (2024)

=== Bibliography ===
- Murray, Braham (2007). The Worst It Can Be Is a Disaster. London, UK: Methuen Drama. ISBN 978-0-7136-8490-2.

== Awards and honours ==
Elliott was appointed Officer of the Order of the British Empire (OBE) in the 2018 Birthday Honours for services to theatre.

=== Awards and nominations ===
Year	Award	Category	Work	Result	Ref.
2006	Evening Standard Theatre Award	Best Director	Pillars of the Community	Won	
2007	Evening Standard Theatre Award	Best Director	War Horse	Nominated	
2008	Laurence Olivier Award	Best Director	War Horse	Nominated	
2011	Tony Award	Best Direction of a Play	War Horse	Won	
2011	Drama Desk Award	Special Award	War Horse	Honouree	
2011	Outer Critics Circle Award	Outstanding Director of a Play	War Horse	Won	
2013	Laurence Olivier Award	Best Director	The Curious Incident of the Dog in the Night-Time	Won	
2015	Tony Award	Best Direction of a Play	The Curious Incident of the Dog in the Night-Time	Won	
2015	Drama Desk Award	Outstanding Director of a Play	The Curious Incident of the Dog in the Night-Time	Won	
2015	Outer Critics Circle Award	Outstanding Director of a Play	The Curious Incident of the Dog in the Night-Time	Won	
2018	Tony Award	Best Revival of a Play	Angels in America	Won	
2018	Tony Award	Best Direction of a Play	Angels in America	Nominated	
2018	Laurence Olivier Award	Best Revival	Angels in America	Won	
2018	Laurence Olivier Award	Best Director	Angels in America	Nominated	
2018	Drama Desk Award	Outstanding Revival of a Play	Angels in America	Won	
2018	Drama Desk Award	Outstanding Director of a Play	Angels in America	Nominated	
2018	Drama League Award	Outstanding Revival of a Play	Angels in America	Won	
2018	Outer Critics Circle Award	Outstanding Revival of a Play	Angels in America	Won	
2018	Outer Critics Circle Award	Outstanding Director of a Play	Angels in America	Nominated	
2018	Evening Standard Theatre Award	Best Director	Company	Won	
2019	Laurence Olivier Award	Best Director	Company	Nominated	
2019	WhatsOnStage Awards	Best Direction	Company	Won	
2019	Evening Standard Theatre Award	Best Director	Death of a Salesman	Nominated	
2020	Laurence Olivier Award	Best Revival	Death of a Salesman	Nominated	
2020	Laurence Olivier Award	Best Director	Death of a Salesman	Won	
2020	Drama League Award	Founders Award for Excellence in Directing		Honouree	
2022	Tony Award	Best Revival of a Musical	Company	Won	
2022	Tony Award	Best Direction of a Musical	Company	Won	
2022	Drama Desk Awards	Outstanding Revival of a Musical	Company	Won	
2022	Drama Desk Awards	Outstanding Direction of a Musical	Company	Won	
2022	Drama League Award	Outstanding Director of a Musical	Company	Won	
2023	Drama Desk Awards	Outstanding Revival of a Play	Death of a Salesman	Nominated	
