= Our Winter Love =

Single by Bill Pursell

from the album Our Winter Love
- B-side: "A Wound Time Can't Erase"
- Released: January 1963
- Recorded: 1962
- Genre: Easy listening
- Length: 2:22
- Label: Columbia
- Songwriter: Johnny Cowell
- Producers: Don Law & Frank Jones

Bill Pursell singles chronology
"Our Winter Love" (1963)	"Loved" (1963)

"Our Winter Love" is an instrumental composition by Johnny Cowell, which was a hit single for Bill Pursell. Pursell's version was recorded in 1962, and was released as a single in January 1963.

== Bill Pursell version ==
While the Bill Pursell version is largely an instrumental, primarily piano with strings, some riffs are vocalized by a chorus of female and male singers. While it wasn't intended to be a Christmas song, some easy listening and adult contemporary radio stations have the Bill Pursell version on their Christmas music playlists.

=== Chart performance ===
"Our Winter Love" spent 14 weeks on the Billboard Hot 100 chart in 1963, peaking at No. 9 on March 30, while reaching No. 4 on Billboard's Middle-Road Singles chart, No. 20 on Billboard's Hot R&B Singles chart, No. 12 in Australia, and No. 25 on Canada's CHUM Hit Parade. Bill Pursell's version was ranked No. 54 on Billboard's end of year ranking "Top Records of 1963".

Chart (1963)	Peak position
US Billboard Hot 100	9
US Billboard Middle-Road Singles	4
US Billboard Hot R&B Singles	20
Australia - Music Maker	12
Canada - CHUM Hit Parade	25

== The Lettermen version ==
In 1966, The Lettermen released a version, with lyrics written by Bob Tubert. This vocal version spent 4 weeks on the Billboard Hot 100 chart in 1967, peaking at No. 72, while reaching No. 16 on Billboard's Easy Listening chart, No. 12 on Record World's "Top Non-Rock" chart, and No. 91 on Canada's "RPM 100".

Chart (1967)	Peak position
US Billboard Hot 100	72
US Billboard Easy Listening	16
US Record World Top Non-Rock	12
Canada - RPM 100	91

== Other versions ==
- In 1963, a version by Lawrence Welk and His Orchestra, was released as the lead track on his album 1963's Early Hits.
