= Death of a Salesman =

1949 play by Arthur Miller

- First edition cover (Viking Press)
- Original language: English
- Written by: Arthur Miller
- Characters: Willy Loman; Linda Loman; Biff Loman; Happy Loman; Ben Loman; Bernard; Charley; The Woman; Howard
- Genre: Tragedy
- Setting: Late 1940s; Willy Loman's house; New York City and Barnaby River; Boston

Premiere
- Date: February 10, 1949
- Place: Morosco Theatre; New York City

Death of a Salesman is a 1949 stage play written by the American playwright Arthur Miller. The play premiered on Broadway on February 10, 1949, running for 742 performances. It is a two-act tragedy—the subtitle of the play is "Certain Private Conversations in Two Acts and a Requiem"—set in late 1940s Brooklyn and told through a montage of memories, dreams, and arguments of the protagonist Willy Loman, a traveling salesman who is despondent with his life and appears to be slipping into senility. The play addresses a variety of themes, such as the American Dream, the anatomy of truth, and infidelity. It won the 1949 Pulitzer Prize for Drama and Tony Award for Best Play. Since its premiere, the play has been revived on Broadway five times, winning an unprecedented four Tony Awards for Best Revival. It has been adapted for the cinema ten times. In 1999, New Yorker drama critic John Lahr said that with 11 million copies sold, it was "probably the most successful modern play ever published."

== Background ==
The genesis of the play was a chance encounter between Miller and his uncle Manny Newman, a salesman, whom he met in 1947 in the lobby of a Boston theater that was playing All My Sons. Miller later recounted that when he saw Manny at the theater, "I could see the grim hotel room behind him, the long trip up from New York in his little car, the hopeless hope of the day's business." Without acknowledging Miller's greeting or congratulating him on the play, Manny said "Buddy is doing very well." Buddy was Manny's son, and Manny saw Miller and his older brother as "running neck and neck" with his two sons "in some race that never stopped in his mind." When visiting Manny as a youth, Miller felt "gangling and unhandsome" and usually heard "some kind of insinuation of my entire life's probable failure." Seeing him again in Boston, Manny seemed to the playwright to be "absurd" and "so elaborate in his fantastic inventions," that "he possessed my imagination." Manny died by suicide soon after.

Miller had been thinking about a play about a salesman for years. He also had new interest in the simultaneity of the past and present. Miller sought to "do a play without any transitions at all, dialogue that would simply leap from bone to bone of a skeleton that would not for an instant cease being added to, an organism as strictly economic as a leaf, as trim as an ant." Miller was himself the model of the young Bernard.

== Plot ==
The play takes place in 1949. The setting is the Loman home in Brooklyn, located amidst a typical row of urban apartment buildings.

=== Act I ===
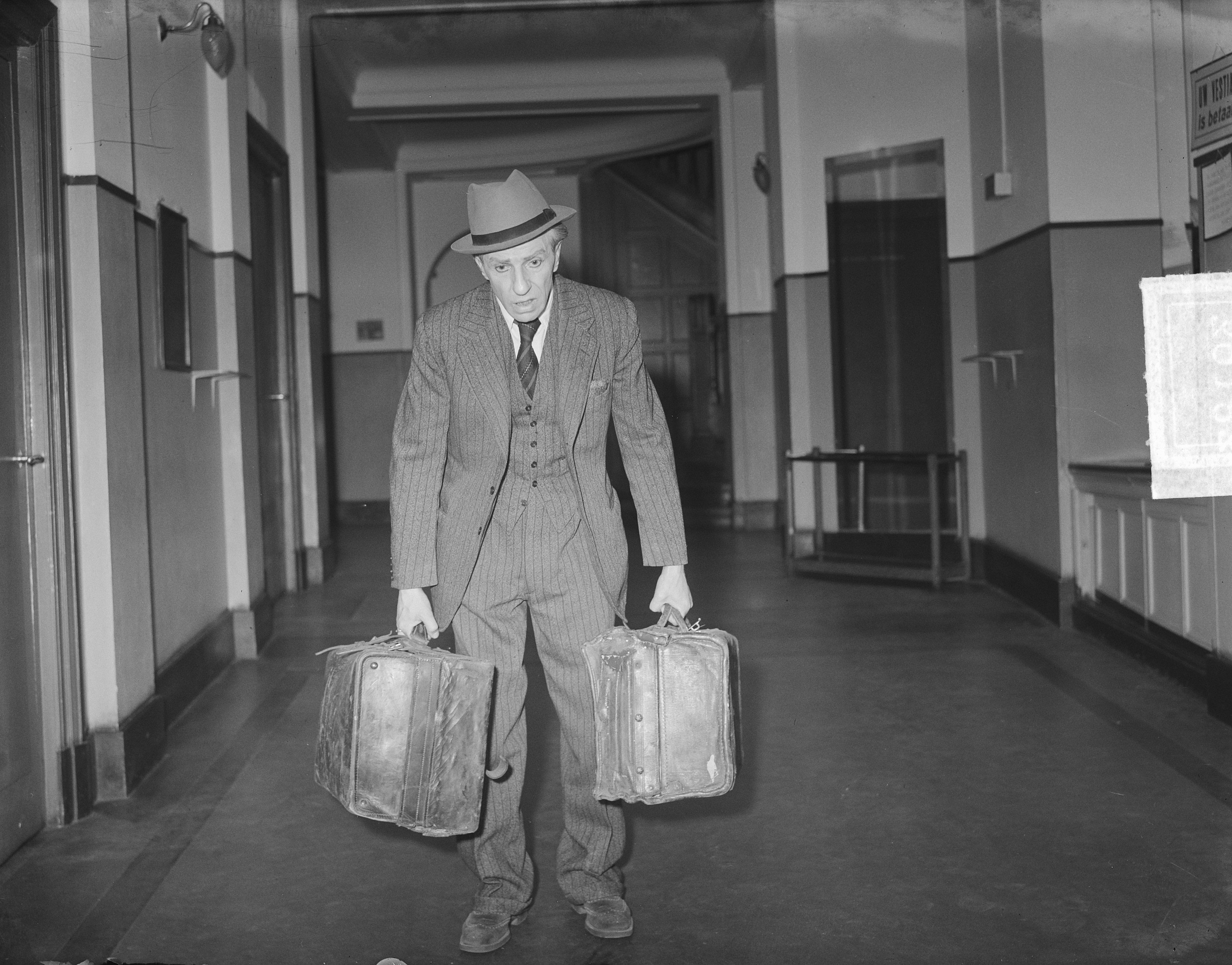
Willy Loman returns home (John Gobau in Toneelgroep Comedia's 1950 production of Death of a Salesman)

Willy Loman suddenly returns home in the middle of the night, exhausted after a failed business trip to Boston. Worried over Willy's rapidly declining state of mind and a recent near-fatal car accident, his wife Linda suggests that he ask his boss, Howard, to allow him to work in his home city so he will no longer have to travel. Willy complains to Linda about their son, Biff, who is 34 years old and has yet to do something meaningful with his life. Despite Biff having a promising high school football career with many scholarship offers to prestigious universities, he failed in mathematics and was therefore unable to enter a university, and spent years drifting around the Western United States working many odd jobs with no clear goal.

Biff and his younger brother, Happy, who is temporarily staying with Willy and Linda after Biff's unexpected return from the West, reminisce about their childhood together. They discuss their father's mental degeneration, which they have witnessed in the form of his constant indecisiveness and daydreaming about the boys' high school years. Eventually, Willy walks in, angry that the two boys have never amounted to anything. In an effort to pacify their father, Biff and Happy tell him that Biff plans to make an ambitious business proposition the next day.

=== Act II ===
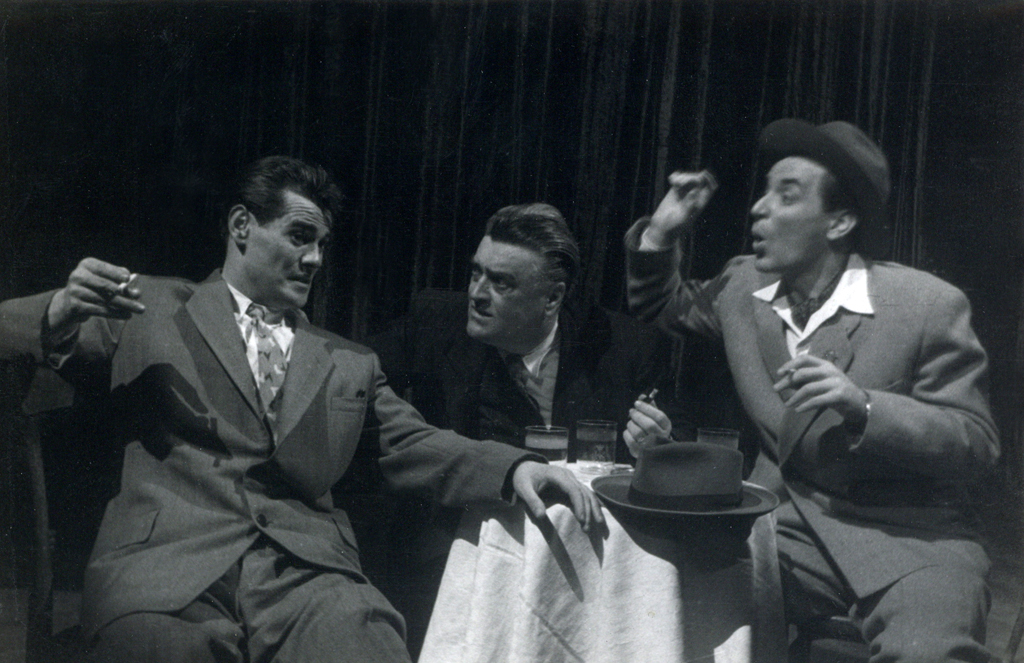
Willy and his children having dinner

The next day, Willy goes to Howard's office for a non-traveling job in town while Biff goes to make a business proposition, but they both fail. Howard who inherited the company from his late father Frank whom Willy had immense respect for staunchly refuses to give Willy a New York job, despite his desperate pleas and ignores the fact that Willy devoted 34 years of loyalty to the company. Willy then loses his temper ranting about why he decided to pursue a career as a salesman but ends up getting fired when Howard tells him that he needs a long rest and is no longer allowed to represent the Wagner Company. On the other hand, Biff waits hours to see a former employer named Bill Oliver, who does not remember him and turns him down. In response, the devastated Biff impulsively steals a fountain pen. Willy then goes to the business office of his neighbor Charley, where he runs into Charley's son Bernard, whom Willy used to arrogantly write off as a stereotypically nerdy "anemic" loser back when Willy's sons were in high school. Bernard is now a wealthy and successful lawyer about to argue a case in front of the Supreme Court, and is happily married with two children of his own. Bernard tells him that Biff originally intended to go to summer school to make up for failing math, but something happened in Boston when Biff went to visit his father that changed his mind. Charley after Willy tells him he just got fired then offers Willy a stable do-nothing job, but Willy vehemently refuses despite having just lost his job. Charley, who feels insulted, reluctantly gives the now-unemployed Willy money to pay off his life-insurance premium, and Willy shocks him by remarking that, ultimately, a man is "worth more dead than alive."

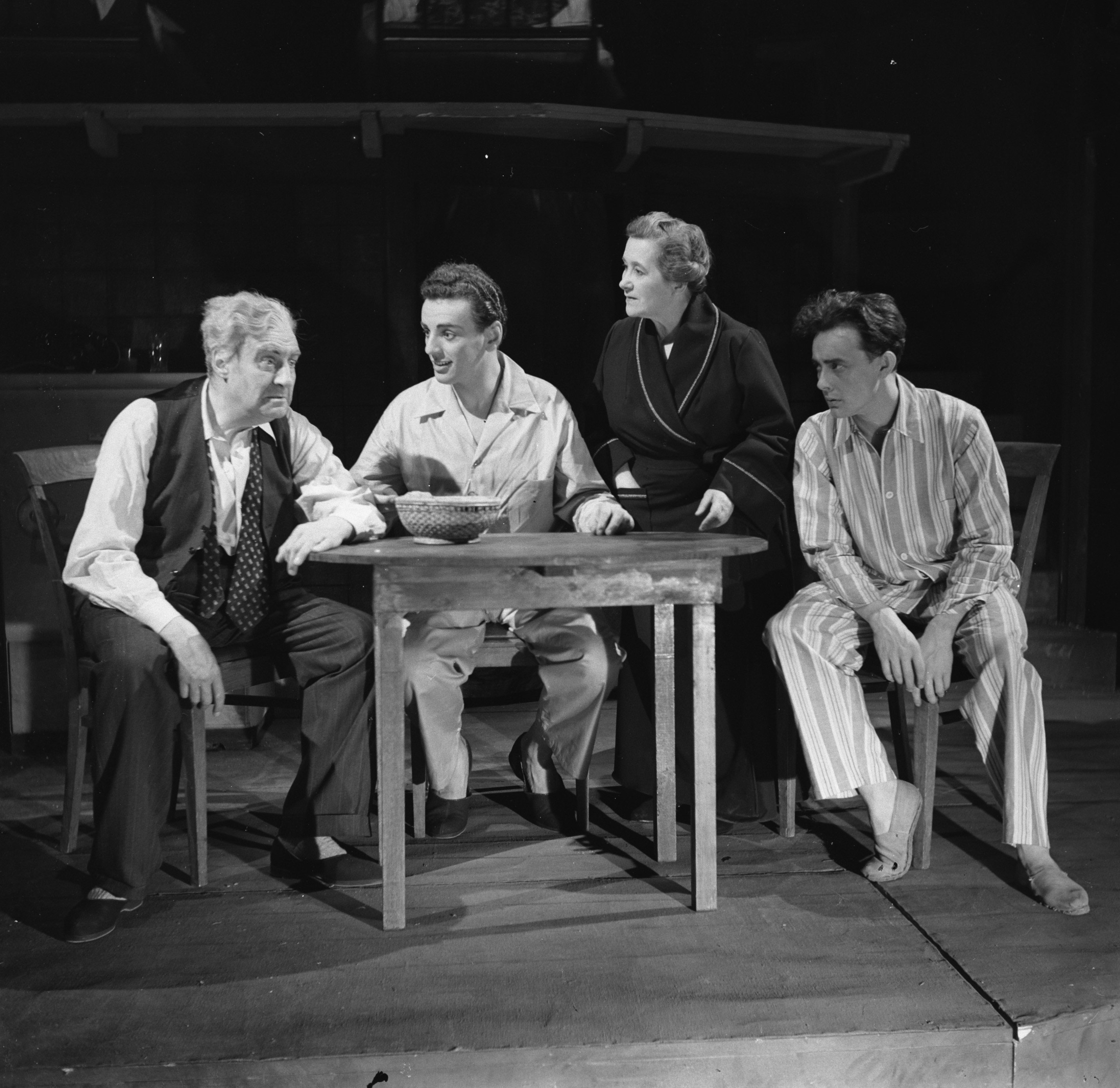
The family in a 1950 premiere of the play in Amsterdam

Happy, Biff, and Willy meet for dinner at a restaurant called Frank's Chop House, but Willy refuses to hear the bad news from Biff and constantly interrupts as if trying to change the story. Happy tries to coax Biff to lie to their father. Biff angrily tries to tell him what actually happened as Willy gets frustrated, withdraws to the restaurant's bathroom, and slips into a flashback of what happened in Boston the day Biff came to see him: Biff had come to Boston to ask Willy to convince his teacher to curve his failing math grade so he could graduate. However, Willy was in the middle of an extramarital affair with a receptionist named Miss Francis when Biff arrived unexpectedly, and saw the half-dressed woman with him. Biff did not accept his father's cover-up story for her presence, and angrily dismissed him as a liar and a fake before storming out. From that moment, Biff's views of his father changed and set him adrift.

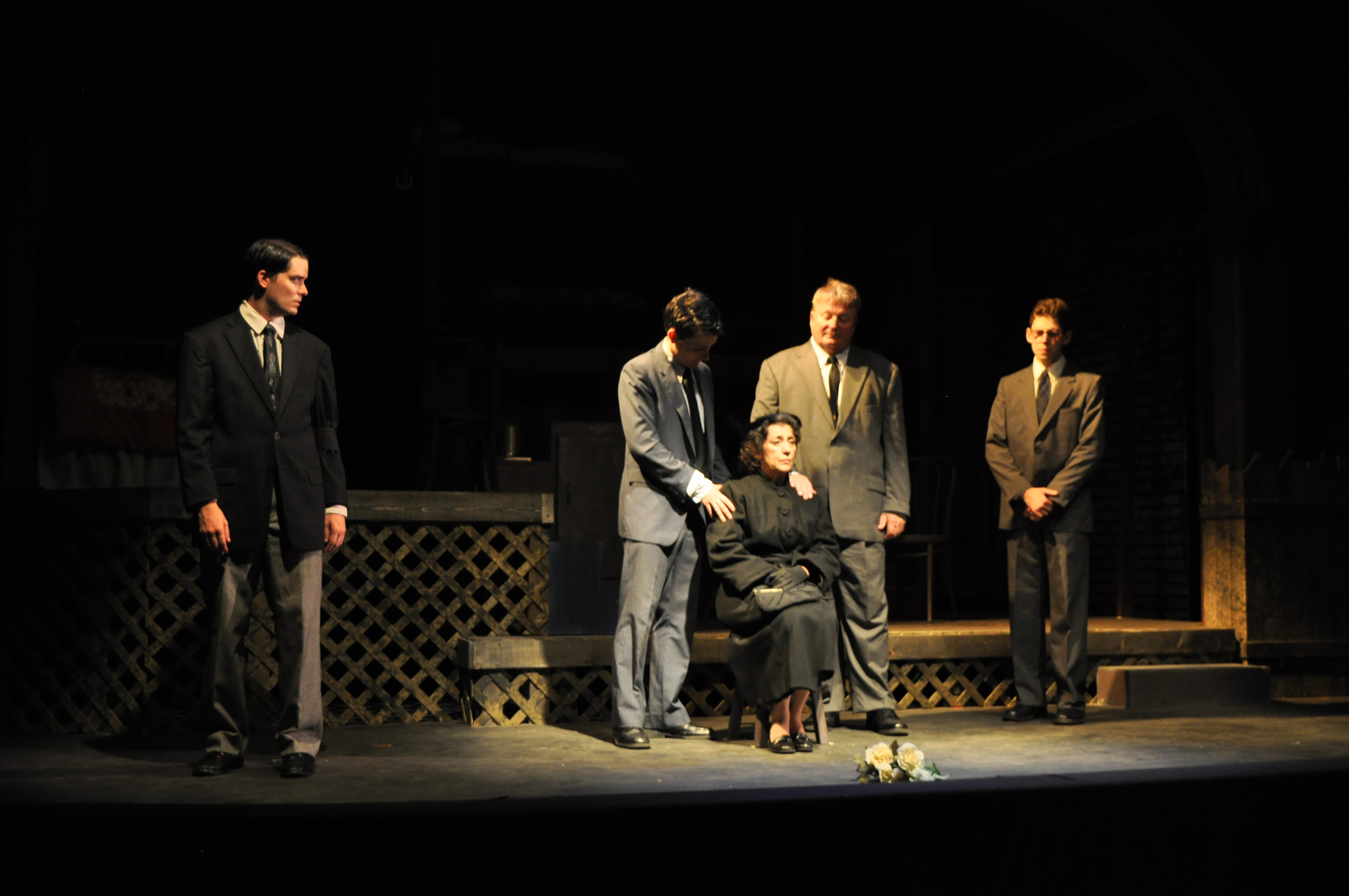
The funeral scene

Biff leaves the restaurant in frustration, followed by Happy, flanked by a pair of attractive women named Miss Forsythe and Letta, leaving a confused and devastated Willy behind. When they later return home, Linda scolds them for abandoning their father, while Willy remains outside talking to himself. Biff tries to reconcile with Willy, but the discussion quickly escalates into a heated argument. Biff conveys plainly to his father that he is not meant for anything great, insisting that both of them are simply ordinary, mediocre men meant to lead ordinary lives. The argument reaches an apparent climax as Biff hugs Willy and begins to cry as he pleads for Willy to let go of his unrealistic expectations. Rather than listen to what Biff actually says, Willy appears to believe his son has forgiven him and will follow in his footsteps, and after Linda goes upstairs to bed, lapses one final time into a hallucination, thinking he is talking to his long-dead estranged wealthy brother Ben. In Willy's mind, Ben "approves" of the scheme Willy has dreamed up to sacrifice his own life in order to give Biff his life insurance money to help him start a business, that his funeral will be well attended with all his admirers, and that this will leave Biff feeling "thunderstruck". Willy then promptly exits the house, and Biff and Linda cry out in despair as the sound of Willy's car blares up and fades out. The car crashes, and Willy is killed instantly.

The final scene takes place at Willy's funeral. Linda and Happy stand in surprise after Willy's funeral is sparsely attended only by his family, Charley, and Bernard, who does not speak during the scene. Biff upholds his belief that he is no longer interested in becoming a businessman like his father and decides to go back West. Happy, on the other hand, chooses to follow in his father's footsteps. Linda, who has finally paid off the family’s last debts with the life insurance payout, begins to sob, repeating "We're free..." All exit, and the curtain falls.

== Characters and cast ==
Notable casts

Character	Broadway	Broadway Revival	Royal Shakespeare	Broadway Revival	Broadway Revival	Broadway Revival	Broadway Revival	Broadway Revival
Character	1949	1975	1980	1984	1999	2012	2022	2026
Willy Loman	Lee J. Cobb	George C. Scott	Bob Peck	Dustin Hoffman	Brian Dennehy	Philip Seymour Hoffman	Wendell Pierce	Nathan Lane
Linda Loman	Mildred Dunnock	Teresa Wright	Francesca Annis	Kate Reid	Elizabeth Franz	Linda Emond	Sharon D. Clarke	Laurie Metcalf
Biff Loman	Arthur Kennedy	James Farentino	Michael Maloney	John Malkovich	Kevin Anderson	Andrew Garfield	Khris Davis	Christopher Abbott
Happy Loman	Cameron Mitchell	Harvey Keitel	Paul Greenwood	Stephen Lang	Ted Koch	Finn Wittrock	McKinley Belcher III	Ben Ahlers
Uncle Ben	Thomas Calmers	Jack Somack	Peter Guiness	Steve Pickering	Louis Zorich	John Glover	André De Shields	Jonathan Cake
Bernard	Joe Maross	Lewis J. Stadlen	Shaun Scott	David Chandler	Richard Thompson	Fran Kranz	Stephen Stocking	Michael B. Washington
Charley	Howard Smith	James Greene	Paul Moriarty	Charles Durning	Howard Witt	Bill Camp	Delaney Williams	K. Todd Freeman
The Woman	Naomi Stevens	Rhian Cardiosa	Helen Mirren	Kathryn Rossetter	Kate Buddeke	Molly Price	Lynn Hawley	Tasha Lawrence

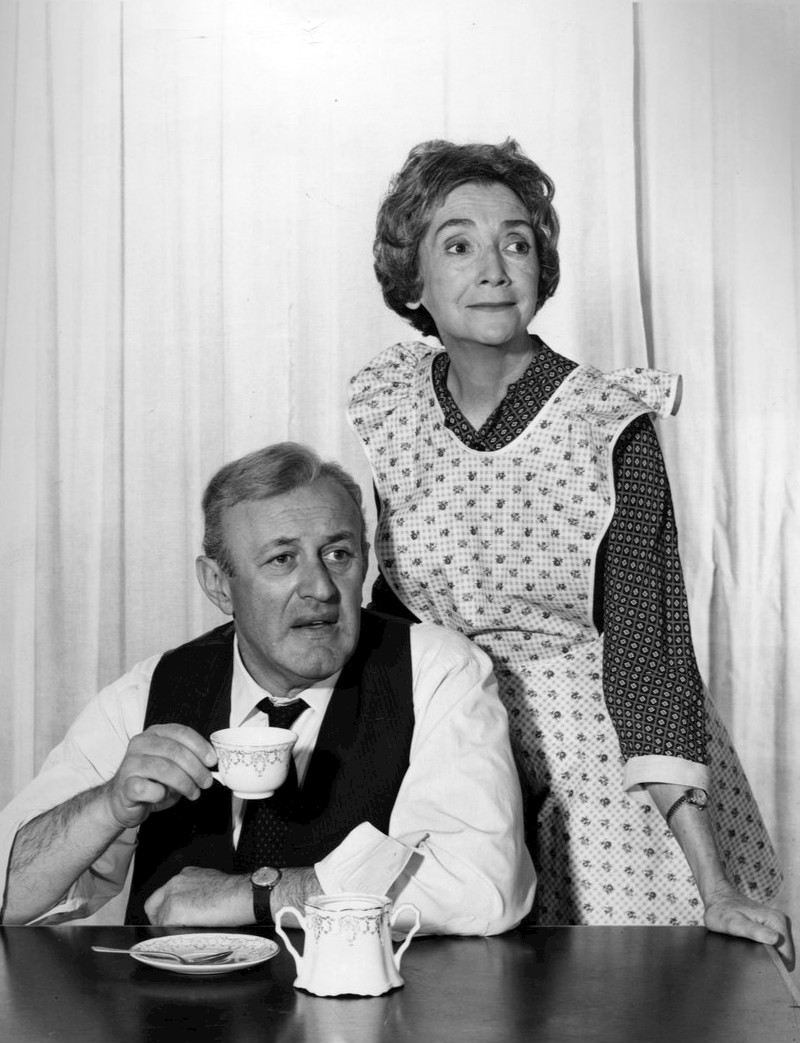
Lee J. Cobb and Mildred Dunnock from the 1966 television presentation of Death of a Salesman

- William "Willy" Loman: The salesman in the play's title. His product is never disclosed. He is 63 years old, insecure, and self-deluded believing himself to be highly successful and well respected even though he is actually a mediocre salesman who can barely make ends meet. He vacillates between different eras of his life throughout the play, and re-imagines them in the present. Willy's age and deteriorating mental state make him appear childlike.
- Linda Loman: Willy's loyal, loving wife. She listens patiently when Willy talks unrealistically about hopes for the future, although she seems to have a good knowledge of what is really going on. She chides her sons, particularly Biff, for not helping their father, and supports her husband, even though he treats her poorly. She is the first to realize that Willy is contemplating suicide.
- Biff Loman: Willy's elder son. Biff had a promising high school football career but failed math his senior year and dropped out of summer school when he saw Willy having an affair with another woman. He wavers between going home to try to fulfill Willy's dream for him as a businessman or ignoring his father by going West to be a farmhand where he feels happy. Biff steals because he wants evidence of success, even if it is false evidence.
- Harold "Happy" Loman: Willy's younger son. He has lived in the shadow of his older brother Biff, but he still tries to be supportive toward his family. He has a restless lifestyle as a womanizer and ambitions of career advancement. He takes bribes at work. He yearns for approval from his parents, but rarely gets it. His relationship with Linda is turbulent; she looks down on him for his lifestyle.
- Charley: Willy's wisecracking yet kind neighbor. He frequently lends Willy money and plays cards with him, although Willy treats him poorly. Willy is envious of him because his son is more successful than Willy's and because Charley has his own business. Throughout the play Charley offers Willy a stable do-nothing job, but Willy declines every time, even after losing his job.
- Bernard: Charley's son. In Willy's flashbacks, he is a stereotypical nerd. Willy forces him to give Biff test answers and sees him as an "anemic" loser compared to Biff. Later, he is a wealthy and successful lawyer who is happily married and expecting a second son – the same successes that Willy wants for his sons.

== Themes ==
=== Reality and illusion ===
Reality and illusion are prominent themes in Death of a Salesman. The play uses flashbacks to present Willy's memories, but it is unclear whether they are accurate. He makes up lies about his and Biff's success. The more he indulges in the illusion, the harder it is for him to face reality. Biff realizes the problem and wants to face the truth. In this conflict, the play shows how the American Dream could be a lie.

=== Tragedy ===
In several statements, Arthur Miller compared the play and its characters to Greek tragedy. Miller wanted to show that the common man and those with status had much in common.

Writing in The New York Times in 1999, journalist John Tierney argued that the play was not constructed like a classical tragedy. He observed that the mental illness suffered by Loman was a "biochemical abnormality" that was "not the sort of tragic flaw that makes a classic play." But he noted that "Willy's fate is supposed to be partly a result of his own moral failings, in particular the adulterous affair [...], he is haunted by the memory of his infidelity and by the fear that it ruined his son's life."

== Reception ==
=== United States ===
Death of a Salesman first opened on February 10, 1949, to great success. Drama critic John Gassner wrote that "the ecstatic reception accorded Death of Salesman has been reverberating for some time wherever there is an ear for theatre, and it is undoubtedly the best American play since A Streetcar Named Desire." Eric Bentley saw the play as "a potential tragedy deflected from its true course by Marxist sympathies."

=== United Kingdom ===
The play opened in London on July 28, 1949. British responses were mixed, but mostly favorable. The Times criticized it, saying that "the strongest play of New York theatrical season should be transferred to London in the deadest week of the year." Eric Keown, theatre critic of Punch, praised the production for its "imagination and good theatre-sense", noting that "Mr. Elia Kazan makes a complicated production seem extraordinarily natural."

=== Germany ===
Death of a Salesman opened at the Hebbel Theater in Berlin in the week of June 21, 1950. Friedrich Luft said the play was hailed as "amongst the most important and successful nights" at the Hebbel in that season and that "it was impossible to get the audience to leave the theatre" afterwards.

=== India ===
Compared to Tennessee Williams and Samuel Beckett, Arthur Miller and his Death of a Salesman were less influential. Rajinder Paul said that "Death of a Salesman has only an indirect influence on Indian theatre." However, it was translated and produced in Bengali as 'Pheriwalar Mrityu' by the theater group Nandikar. Director Feroz Khan adapted the play in Hindi and English by the name "Salesman Ramlal" played by Satish Kaushik, the son was portrayed by Kishore Kadam.

=== China ===
Arthur Miller directed the play himself in China, stating that it was easier for the Chinese public to understand the relationship between father and son because "One thing about the play that is very Chinese is the way Willy tries to make his sons successful." Many traditional Chinese fathers want their sons to be 'dragons.'

=== Poland ===
The play's Polish premiere took place on January 23, 1960, at the Nowy Theatre in Łódź. That same year, it was performed by six different theatres across the country. Since then, Miller's play has been regularly performed in Poland, most recently in 2025.

== Productions ==
=== United States ===
The original Broadway production was produced by Kermit Bloomgarden and Walter Fried. The play opened at the Morosco Theatre on February 10, 1949, closing on November 18, 1950, after 742 performances. The play starred Lee J. Cobb as Willy Loman, Mildred Dunnock as Linda, Arthur Kennedy as Biff, Howard Smith as Charley and Cameron Mitchell as Happy. Albert Dekker and Gene Lockhart later played Willy Loman during the original Broadway run. It won the Tony Award for Best Play, Best Supporting or Featured Actor (Arthur Kennedy), Best Scenic Design (Jo Mielziner), Producer (Dramatic), Author (Arthur Miller), and Director (Elia Kazan), as well as the 1949 Pulitzer Prize for Drama and the New York Drama Critics' Circle Award for Best Play. Jayne Mansfield performed in a production of the play in Dallas, Texas, in October 1953. Her performance in the play attracted Paramount Pictures to hire her for the studio's film productions.

The play has been revived on Broadway six times:

- June 26, 1975, at the Circle in the Square Theatre, running for 71 performances. George C. Scott starred as Willy.
- March 29, 1984, at the Broadhurst Theatre, running for 97 performances. Dustin Hoffman played Willy. In a return engagement, this production re-opened on September 14, 1984, and ran for 88 performances. The production won the Tony Award for Best Revival and the Drama Desk Award for Outstanding Revival.
- February 10, 1999, at the Eugene O'Neill Theatre, running for 274 performances, with Brian Dennehy as Willy. The production won the Tony Award for: Best Revival of a Play; Best Actor in Play; Best Featured Actress in a Play (Elizabeth Franz); Best Direction of a Play (Robert Falls). This production was filmed.
- March 15, 2012, at the Ethel Barrymore Theatre, in a limited run of 16 weeks. Directed by Mike Nichols, the production starred Philip Seymour Hoffman as Willy, Andrew Garfield as Biff, Linda Emond as Linda, and Finn Wittrock as Happy.
- October 9, 2022, at the Hudson Theatre, for a limited engagement of 17 weeks. Directed by Miranda Cromwell, the production starred Wendell Pierce as Willy, Sharon D. Clarke as Linda, Khris Davis as Biff, André De Shields as Ben, and McKinley Belcher III as Happy. Pierce and Clarke reprised their roles from the 2019–20 West End production.
- April 9, 2026, at the Winter Garden Theater, for a limited run of 22 weeks. Directed by Joe Mantello, the production stars Nathan Lane as Willy, Laurie Metcalf as Linda, Christopher Abbott as Biff, and Ben Ahlers as Happy. The production won six Tony Awards, including Best Revival, the most awards ever for a revival. The revival was produced by Scott Rudin and Barry Diller. In August, 2026, the production closed after 36 previews and 131 regular performances.

It was also part of the inaugural season of the Guthrie Theater in Minneapolis, Minnesota in 1963.

Christopher Lloyd portrayed Willy Loman in a 2010 production by the Weston Playhouse in Weston, Vermont, which toured several New England venues.

=== United Kingdom ===
In 1966, Shay Gorman played Willy Loman in a production by London's Unity Theatre directed by Harry Landis.

After Warren Mitchell had played the title role in Perth, Western Australia, under the direction of Stephen Barry in March 1979, he reprised the role for the Royal National Theatre in London in September 1979. He won both an Evening Standard Award and an Olivier Award for this performance, and was highly praised by Peter Hall. Arthur Miller described it as "one of the best interpretations of the part he had ever seen".

Antony Sher played Willy Loman in the first Royal Shakespeare Company production of the play directed by Gregory Doran in Stratford-upon-Avon in the spring of 2015, with Harriet Walter as Linda Loman. This production transferred to London's West End, at the Noël Coward Theatre for ten weeks in the summer of 2015. This production was part of the centenary celebrations for playwright Arthur Miller.

The play ran from 24 October 2019 until 4 January 2020 at the Piccadilly Theatre in London, starring Sharon D. Clarke and Wendell Pierce.

David Hayman played Willy Loman in a Trafalgar Theatre production in London's West End, directed by Andy Arnold which toured the United Kingdom and Ireland in the spring of 2025.

Paul Mescal will play Biff Loman in a Lyttelton Theatre production in 2027.

=== Australia ===
In March 1979, Warren Mitchell played Loman in a production at the Playhouse Theatre in Perth, under the direction of Stephen Barry. It was later staged in London.

Anthony LaPaglia starred as Loman in the Australian production at Her Majesty's Theatre, Melbourne, in 2023 and the Theatre Royal Sydney in 2024. The play was directed by Neil Armfield. The cast included Alison Whyte as Linda Loman, Josh Helman as Biff Loman, and Ben O'Toole as Happy. The production opened to positive reviews in both cities. Reviewer Joyce Morgan of The Sydney Morning Herald gave the show 4.5 stars out of 5. This production was staged again in 2026 in Brisbane and Adelaide (the cast including Mark Saturno) co-produced by Torben and Richelle Brookman. By the end of the run it will have completed over 130 performances, in front of more than 125,000 people.

== Adaptations in other media ==
- 1951: American film adapted by Stanley Roberts and directed by László Benedek, who won the Golden Globe Award for Best Director. Nominated for Academy Awards for Best Actor in a Leading Role (Fredric March), Best Actor in a Supporting Role (Kevin McCarthy), Best Actress in a Supporting Role (Mildred Dunnock), Best Cinematography, Black-and-White, and Best Music, Scoring of a Dramatic or Comedy Picture.
- 1960: Soviet film, directed by Theodore Wolfovitch as You Can't Cross the Bridge.
- 1961: Swedish film En Handelsresandes död starring Kolbjörn Knudsen and directed by Hans Abramson (in Swedish).
- 1966 (CBS): TV film starring Lee J. Cobb, Gene Wilder, Mildred Dunnock, James Farentino, Karen Steele, and George Segal and directed by Alex Segal.
- 1966 (BBC): TV film starring Rod Steiger, Betsy Blair, Tony Bill, Brian Davies, and Joss Ackland and directed by Alan Cooke.
- 1968: German film Der Tod eines Handlungsreisenden starring Heinz Rühmann and directed by Gerhard Klingenberg.
- 1979: Swedish film En Handelsresandes död starring Carl-Gustav Lindstedt and directed by Bo Widerberg (in Swedish).
- 1985: TV film starring Dustin Hoffman, Kate Reid, John Malkovich, Stephen Lang, and Charles Durning and directed by Volker Schlöndorff.
- 1996: TV film starring Warren Mitchell, Rosemary Harris, Iain Glen, and Owen Teale and directed by David Thacker.
- 2000: TV film starring Brian Dennehy, Elizabeth Franz, Ron Eldard, Ted Koch, Howard Witt, and Richard Thompson and directed by Kirk Browning.
- 2008: Play within the American film Synecdoche, New York, starring Philip Seymour Hoffman.
- 2015: Radio drama, starring David Suchet and Zoë Wanamaker, directed by Howard Davies, and broadcast on BBC Radio 3.
- 2016: Play within the Iranian/French film The Salesman (Forushande), acting as counterpoint to the main plot. Starring Shahab Hosseini, Taraneh Alidoosti, Babak Karimi, and directed by Asghar Farhadi.

== Works inspired by the play or its productions ==
- Salesman in Beijing (1984) by Arthur Miller, with photos by wife Inge Morath, recounts his experience directing the play for Beijing People's Art Theatre in 1983.
- Wife of a Salesman (2022) by Eleanor Burgess, received its world premiere at the Writers Theatre (Glencoe, Illinois) in a joint production with Milwaukee Repertory Theater. The play's premise is that Linda Loman confronts a woman with whom Willy is having an affair.
- Salesman in China – by Leanna Brodie and Jovanni Sy had its world premiere as part of the Stratford Festival's 2024 season. It covers the 1983 Beijing People's Art Theatre production and is performed in English and Chinese, with subtitles in both languages.

== Awards and nominations ==
=== Original Broadway production ===
Year	Award	Category	Nominee	Result
1949	Tony Awards	Best Play		Won
1949	Tony Awards	Best Author of a Play	Arthur Miller	Won
1949	Tony Awards	Best Producer of a Play	Kermit Bloomgarden & Walter Fried	Won
1949	Tony Awards	Best Featured Actor in a Play	Arthur Kennedy	Won
1949	Tony Awards	Best Director	Elia Kazan	Won
1949	Tony Awards	Best Scenic Design	Jo Mielziner	Won
1949	New York Drama Critics' Circle	Best American Play	Arthur Miller	Won
1949	Theatre World Award		Cameron Mitchell	Won
1949	Pulitzer Prize	Drama	Arthur Miller	Won

=== 1975 Broadway production ===
Year	Award	Category	Nominee	Result
1976	Tony Award	Best Actor in a Play	George C. Scott	Nominated

=== 1984 Broadway production ===
Year	Award	Category	Nominee	Result
1984	Tony Awards	Best Revival of a Play		Won
1984	Drama Desk Awards	Outstanding Revival		Won
1984	Drama Desk Awards	Outstanding Actor in a Play	Dustin Hoffman	Won
1984	Drama Desk Awards	Outstanding Featured Actor in a Play	John Malkovich	Won
1984	Drama Desk Awards	Outstanding Featured Actor in a Play	David Huddleston	Nominated
1984	Outer Critics Circle Awards	Outstanding Revival		Won
1984	Outer Critics Circle Awards	Outstanding Debut Performance	John Malkovich	Won

=== 1999 Broadway production ===
Year	Award	Category	Nominee	Result nothing
1999	Tony Awards	Best Revival of a Play		Won
1999	Tony Awards	Best Actor in a Play	Brian Dennehy	Won
1999	Tony Awards	Best Featured Actor in a Play	Kevin Anderson	Nominated
1999	Tony Awards	Best Featured Actor in a Play	Howard Witt	Nominated
1999	Tony Awards	Best Featured Actress in a Play	Elizabeth Franz	Won
1999	Tony Awards	Best Direction of a Play	Robert Falls	Won
1999	Drama Desk Awards	Outstanding Revival of a Play		Won
1999	Drama Desk Awards	Outstanding Actor in a Play	Brian Dennehy	Won
1999	Drama Desk Awards	Outstanding Actor in a Play	Kevin Anderson	Won
1999	Drama Desk Awards	Outstanding Actor in a Play	Howard Witt	Nominated
1999	Drama Desk Awards	Outstanding Featured Actress in a Play	Elizabeth Franz	Nominated
1999	Drama Desk Awards	Best Director of a Play	Robert Falls	Nominated
1999	Drama Desk Awards	Outstanding Music in a Play	Richard Woodbury	Nominated
1999	Outer Critics Circle Awards	Outstanding Revival of a Play		Nominated
1999	Outer Critics Circle Awards	Outstanding Actor in a Play	Brian Dennehy	Nominated
1999	Outer Critics Circle Awards	Outstanding Featured Actor in a Play	Kevin Anderson	Won
1999	Outer Critics Circle Awards	Outstanding Actress in a Play	Elizabeth Franz	Nominated
1999	Outer Critics Circle Awards	Outstanding Director of a Play	Robert Falls	Nominated
1999	Drama League Awards	Distinguished Production of a Revival		Won

=== 2012 Broadway production ===
Year	Award	Category	Nominee	Result
2012	Tony Awards	Best Revival of a Play		Won
2012	Tony Awards	Best Actor in a Play	Philip Seymour Hoffman	Nominated
2012	Tony Awards	Best Featured Actor in a Play	Andrew Garfield	Nominated
2012	Tony Awards	Best Featured Actress in a Play	Linda Emond	Nominated
2012	Tony Awards	Best Direction of a Play	Mike Nichols	Won
2012	Tony Awards	Best Lighting Design of a Play	Brian MacDevitt	Nominated
2012	Tony Awards	Best Sound Design of a Play	Scott Lehrer	Nominated
2012	Drama Desk Awards	Outstanding Revival of a Play		Won
2012	Drama Desk Awards	Outstanding Actor in a Play	Philip Seymour Hoffman	Nominated
2012	Drama Desk Awards	Outstanding Featured Actor in a Play	Bill Camp	Nominated
2012	Drama Desk Awards	Outstanding Director of a Play	Mike Nichols	Won
2012	Drama Desk Awards	Outstanding Lighting Design	Brian MacDevitt	Won
2012	Outer Critics Circle Awards	Outstanding Revival of a Play		Won
2012	Outer Critics Circle Awards	Outstanding Actor in a Play	Philip Seymour Hoffman	Nominated
2012	Outer Critics Circle Awards	Outstanding Featured Actor in a Play	Andrew Garfield	Nominated
2012	Outer Critics Circle Awards	Outstanding Director of a Play	Mike Nichols	Nominated
2012	Outer Critics Circle Awards	Outstanding Lighting Design	Brian MacDevitt	Nominated
2012	Drama League Awards	Distinguished Revival of a Play		Won
2012	Theatre World Award		Finn Wittrock	Won
2012	Clarence Derwent Awards	Most Promising Male Performer	Finn Wittrock	Won

=== 2019 West End production ===
Year	Award	Category	Nominee	Result
2019	Critics' Circle Theatre Award	Best Actress	Sharon D. Clarke	Won
2019	Evening Standard Theatre Award	Best Actor	Wendell Pierce	Nominated
2019	Evening Standard Theatre Award	Best Director	Marianne Elliott and Miranda Cromwell	Nominated
2020	2020 Laurence Olivier Awards	Best Revival		Nominated
2020	2020 Laurence Olivier Awards	Best Actor	Wendell Pierce	Nominated
2020	2020 Laurence Olivier Awards	Best Actress	Sharon D. Clarke	Won
2020	2020 Laurence Olivier Awards	Best Actor in a Supporting Role	Arinzé Kene	Nominated
2020	2020 Laurence Olivier Awards	Best Director	Marianne Elliott and Miranda Cromwell	Won

=== 2022 Broadway revival ===
Year	Award	Category	Nominee	Result
2023	Tony Awards	Best Actor in a Play	Wendell Pierce	Nominated
2023	Tony Awards	Best Lighting Design of a Play	Jen Schriever	Nominated
2023	Drama Desk Awards	Outstanding Revival of a Play		Nominated
2023	Drama Desk Awards	Outstanding Direction of a Play	Miranda Cromwell	Nominated
2023	Drama Desk Awards	Outstanding Lead Performance in a Play	Sharon D. Clarke	Nominated
2023	Drama Desk Awards	Outstanding Lead Performance in a Play	Wendell Pierce	Nominated
2023	Drama League Awards	Distinguished Performance Award	Sharon D. Clarke	Nominated
2023	Outer Critics Circle Awards	Outstanding Revival of a Play (Broadway or Off-Broadway)		Nominated
2023	Outer Critics Circle Awards	Outstanding Featured Performer in a Broadway Play	Sharon D. Clarke	Nominated

=== 2026 Broadway revival ===
Year	Award	Category	Nominee	Result
2026	Drama Desk Awards	Outstanding Revival of a Play		Won
2026	Drama Desk Awards	Outstanding Lead Performance in a Play	Nathan Lane	Nominated
2026	Drama Desk Awards	Outstanding Lead Performance in a Play	Laurie Metcalf	Nominated
2026	Drama League Awards	Outstanding Revival of a Play		Won
2026	Drama League Awards	Outstanding Direction of a Play	Joe Mantello	Won
2026	Drama League Awards	Distinguished Performance	Laurie Metcalf	Nominated
2026	Drama League Awards	Distinguished Performance	Christopher Abbott	Nominated
2026	Outer Critics Circle Award	Outstanding Revival of a Play		Won
2026	Outer Critics Circle Award	Outstanding Lead Performer in a Broadway Play	Nathan Lane	Won
2026	Outer Critics Circle Award	Outstanding Featured Performer in a Broadway Play	Laurie Metcalf	Won
2026	Outer Critics Circle Award	Outstanding Direction of a Play	Joe Mantello	Won
2026	Tony Awards	Best Revival of a Play		Won
2026	Tony Awards	Best Actor in a Play	Nathan Lane	Nominated
2026	Tony Awards	Best Featured Actress in a Play	Laurie Metcalf	Won
2026	Tony Awards	Best Featured Actor in a Play	Christopher Abbott	Nominated
2026	Tony Awards	Best Direction of a Play	Joe Mantello	Won
2026	Tony Awards	Best Original Score	Caroline Shaw	Nominated
2026	Tony Awards	Best Scenic Design of a Play	Chloe Lamford	Won
2026	Tony Awards	Best Lighting Design of a Play	Jack Knowles	Won
2026	Tony Awards	Best Sound Design of a Play	Mikaal Sulaiman	Won
2026	Dorian Award (Note: Other sources:)	Outstanding Broadway Play Revival		Won
2026	Dorian Award	Outstanding Lead Performance in a Broadway Play	Nathan Lane	Nominated
2026	Dorian Award	Outstanding Featured Performance in a Broadway Play	Laurie Metcalf	Nominated
2026	Dorian Award	Outstanding Featured Performance in a Broadway Play	Christopher Abbott	Nominated
2026	Dorian Award	Outstanding Broadway Ensemble	Company	Nominated
2026	Dorian Award	Outstanding Original Score of a Broadway Production	Caroline Shaw	Nominated
