= Miranda Cromwell =

British theatre director (born 1984)

Miranda Kay Cromwell (born 1984) is an English theatre director whose work is focused on new writing, musicals and reinterpreting traditional material. She is one of only six women who have won the Laurence Olivier Award for Best Director.

== Early life and education ==
Cromwell was born in North London and is of mixed heritage. She attended Fortismere School. Cromwell graduated with a Bachelor of Arts (BA) in Theatre from Dartington College of Arts (now part of Falmouth University) in 2007.

== Career ==
After a role at the Bristol Old Vic encouraging young talent her artistic breakthrough came with her co-direction of Arthur Miller's Death of a Salesman at the Young Vic. This cast the Logan family as Black, taking a fresh view of the barriers to achieving the American Dream. She was awarded the Olivier Award for Best Director for this production (with co-director Marianne Elliott),

=== Bristol Old Vic ===
Miranda was Young Company Director at the Bristol Old Vic for seven years.

=== Bristol School of Acting ===
Miranda is co-artistic director at the Bristol School of Acting

=== Chichester Festival Theatre ===
She is co-Artistic director at the Chichester Festival Theatre

=== National Theatre ===
She is a Artistic Associate at the National Theatre, where she works with other Associates to shape the creative vision.

== Works ==
- 2019 Death of a Salesman at the Young Vic - Director
- 2021 Rockets and Blue Lights by Winsome Pinnock at the Dorfman Theatre about the Atlantic slave trade
- 2021 and breathe... at the Almeida Theatre. Director.
- 2021 This is a Love Story at the Dundee Rep.
- 2023 The Beekeeper of Aleppo at the Nottingham Playhouse

== Awards ==
- Nominated, with Marianne Elliott for Milton Shulman Award for Best Director at the 65th Evening Standard Theatre Awards in 2019
- Laurence Olivier Award for Best Revival and Laurence Olivier Award for Best Director in 2020 for Death of a Salesman
- Best Director for a Play or Musical for and breathe at the 2021 Black British Theatre Awards
