= The World Only Spins Forward =

2018 nonfiction book

The World Only Spins Forward: The Ascent of Angels in America
- Authors: Isaac Butler and Dan Kois
- Language: English
- Subjects: Angels in America; Stage history
- Published: February 13, 2018 (Bloomsbury)
- Publication place: United States
- Media type: Print (Hardcover)
- Pages: 448
- ISBN: 978-1-63557-176-9
- OCLC: 990837091

The World Only Spins Forward: The Ascent of Angels in America is an oral history of the play Angels in America, first published in 2018. Theater director and writer Isaac Butler and journalist Dan Kois co-authored the history based upon interviews conducted in 2016–2017 with people involved with the play in different ways. The oral history was originally compiled by the authors for the 2016 Slate cover story "Angels in America: The Complete Oral History". The release of the book commemorated the 25th anniversary of the play's Broadway theatre premiere in 1993.

== Overview ==
The oral history draws from around 250 interviews with people directly and indirectly involved with Angels in America, ranging from its playwright Tony Kushner to former Congressman Barney Frank. Quotes from these interviews are combined with relevant selections from the play, contemporary press coverage, and photos to tell the story of the play, its context, and its impact. The book begins by setting the social and political context for the work, exploring how such events as the 1978 assassination of Harvey Milk and the beginnings of the AIDS crisis in the 1980s influenced and inspired Kushner's writing of the play. It then follows the writing, development, and initial production history of the play, examining how it went from a small theater in San Francisco to winning the Tony Award for Best Play during its Broadway run. The social and political impacts of the play are also explored, as well as its legacy in the theater world and its continued importance and relevance as a work of art. The book also covers how subsequent productions of the play, such as those in politically conservative areas, came to be and how their audiences and communities reacted to them.

== Reviews ==
Steven Winn, writing for SFGATE, praised the authors' ability to capture the lasting significance of Angels in America and to vividly depict what goes into great theater, but noted that the amount of detail included in the book was sometimes overwhelming. Alyssa Rosenberg of The Washington Post described the history as a "vital book about how to make political art that offers lasting solace in times of great trouble, and wisdom to audiences in the years that follow."

== Release details ==
Butler, Isaac; Kois, Dan (February 13, 2018). The World Only Spins Forward: The Ascent of Angels in America. New York: Bloomsbury. ISBN 9781635571769.
