= Twin Cities Gay Men's Chorus =

American choral group

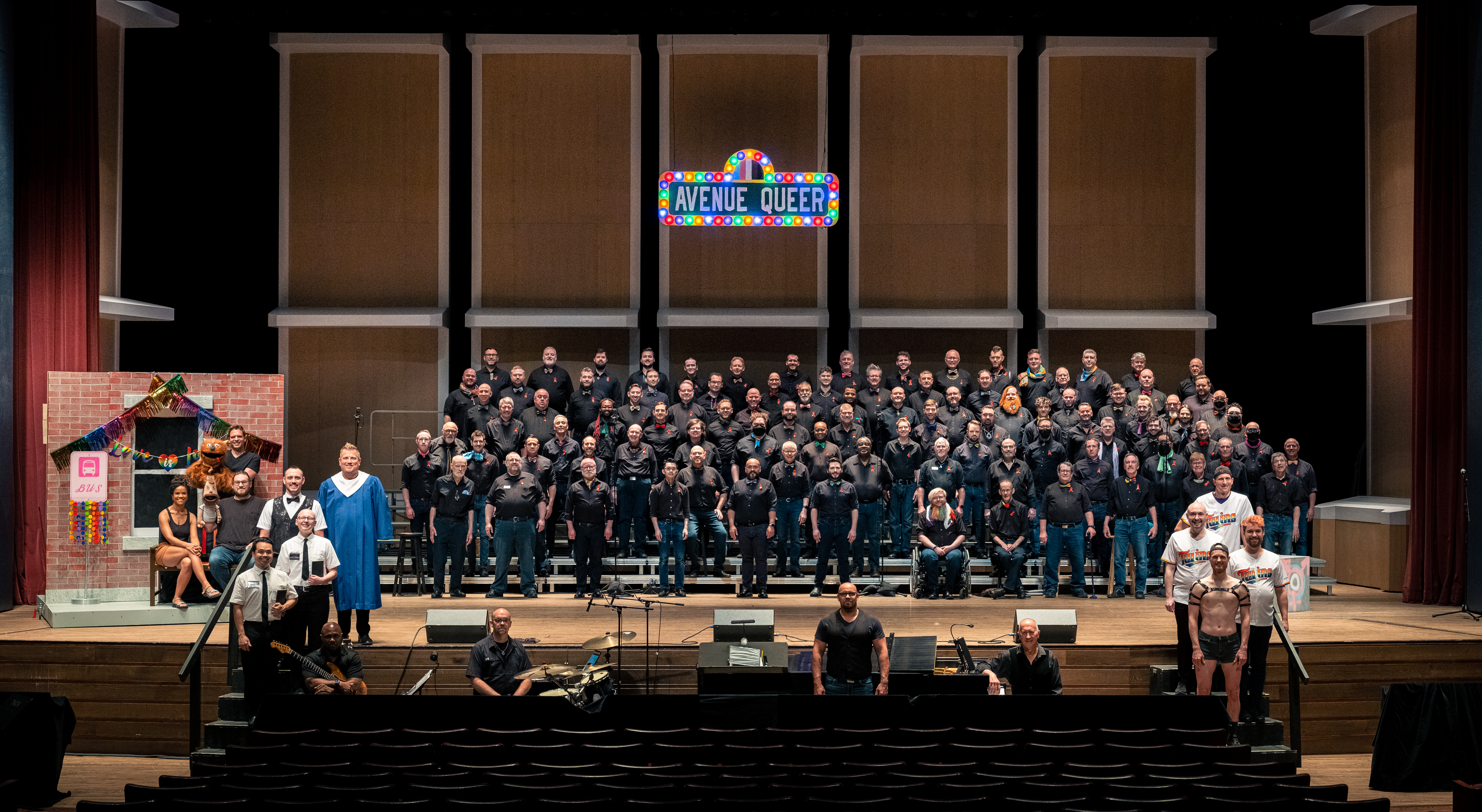
- All company photo for the chorus's June 2022 show "Avenue Queer" a revue of music from stage musicals. Taken at Ted Mann Concert Hall at the University of Minnesota.

Background information
- Also known as: TCGMC
- Origin: Minneapolis, Minnesota, United States
- Genres: Choral, Broadway, Classical, Jazz, Popular
- Occupation: Men's Choir
- Instrument: ca. 180 voices
- Years active: 1981-present
- Members: Artistic Director and Conductor; Dr. Gerald Gurss Principal Accompanist; Timothy De Prey OutLoud (Associate Small Ensemble) Director; Chad Garrels Executive Director; Dennis Whipple Operations Manager; Miranda Gruber Production Manager; Matt Hudson Mission Statement "Building Community Through Music"
- Website: www.tcgmc.org

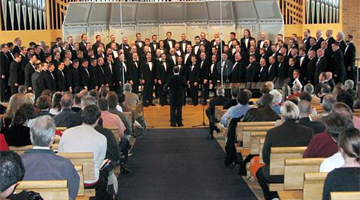
The Twin Cities Gay Men's performing in 2006

The Twin Cities Gay Men's Chorus (TCGMC) is a non-profit 501(c)(3) choral ensemble in Minneapolis—St. Paul. The lower-voice chorus sings a variety of songs arranged for TTBB, ranging from Broadway show tunes to Latin motets to original compositions specially commissioned by the Chorus or written by its members.

With 180 auditioned, volunteer singing members, the Chorus produces and presents a full concert season every year and is also featured at a number of other special appearances and outreach programs locally, throughout the Midwest and the nation.

TCGMC is a member-driven organization governed by a 24-member Board of Directors composed of 50% singing members. Its current Artistic Director is Dr. Gerald Gurss and its Executive Director is Dennis Whipple.

== History ==
The Twin Cities Gay Men's Chorus was formed in 1981 as Twin Cities Men's Chorus, adding the word "gay" to their title in 1991. TCGMC has grown to be one of the largest LGBT+ arts organizations in Minnesota and the fourth largest gay men's chorus in the country. It is a member of the Gay and Lesbian Association of Choruses (GALA Choruses).

Additionally, the Chorus, along with Emmy award-winning producers John Scagliotti and Dan Hunt and author Tomie dePaola produced a video program, Oliver Button is a STAR!, that was broadcast nationally on PBS in the fall of 2001 and spring of 2002. The video program is a documentary based on the Chorus' performance of Tomie dePaola's children's book, Oliver Button is a Sissy, and was further developed as a teaching tool for distribution to schools and families. The performance was repeated during the 2012–2013 season to raise awareness of school bullying.

Other notable events in the history of the TCGMC include: Performances with Minnesota Orchestra, Saint Paul Chamber Orchestra, VocalEssence (Plymouth Music Series), Ballet of the Dolls, American composer Ned Rorem, and such noted gay and lesbian entertainers Harvey Fierstein, Ann Hampton Callaway, Michael Feinstein and Holly Near. TCGMC has premiered over 25 commissioned works and has performed at major gay and lesbian choral festivals in Montreal, Tampa, Denver, Seattle, San Jose and Minneapolis (for which the TCGMC served as host, both in 1986 and in 2024). Regular appearances include Minnesota AIDS Walk, the Twin Cities Pride festival, and concerts at Como Pavilion.

In 2003, the Twin Cities Gay Men's Chorus was honored with the Human Rights Campaign Minnesota 2003 "Brian Coyle Leadership Award" for serving the community through outreach and putting a face on the GLBT community. TCGMC also received special recognition in 2003 from Lavender magazine for "Best Benefit/Fundraiser" for Songs from the Heart and in 2003 and 2004 for "Best GLBT Music Group".

Capping off their 25th Anniversary season, the chorus embarked on the "Great Southern Sing-Out Tour" through five cities in six days in July 2006. Kicking off the tour in Nashville's prestigious Ryman Auditorium, the chorus became the first gay organization to perform on the historic stage. From Tennessee, three bus loads of chorus members and supporters traveled to Birmingham, Alabama; Jackson, Mississippi; Mobile, Alabama; and New Orleans, Louisiana.

In November 2006, TCGMC became the first gay men's chorus with the word "gay" in its name to perform for the American Choral Directors Association at an ACDA convention since 1986, when the Los Angeles Gay Men's Chorus successfully sued for inclusion after being accepted in a blind audition, then denied when the blind was broken to reveal the word "gay" in its name.

One of the Chorus' recent works, Through A Glass, Darkly, commissioned from New York composer Michael Shaieb, addresses the problem of methamphetamine addiction in the gay community. The bold, daring production premiered to critical acclaim in March 2008, playing to packed houses. The performance was recorded by Twin Cities Public Television for broadcast on PBS and production of a DVD released in the summer of 2008, and was featured at the 2008 GALA Choruses festival in Miami, Florida in July 2008. Additionally, the Chorus commissioned Shaieb to write a trilogy of songs based on texts by playwright Tony Kushner, the first of which premiered at the Guthrie Theater's Kushner Festival in 2009, and Out of My Range which was performed at the 2012 GALA Choruses festival in Denver.

The Chorus' signature song, with which they end all concerts, is "Walk Hand in Hand" composed by Johnny Cowell and originally performed by Tony Martin, Ronnie Carroll and Andy Williams in 1956, during which the audience is encouraged to stand, join hands, and sing along. An upbeat dance remix was premiered in their spring 2008 concert, "Friends ARE Benefits".

=== Artistic Directors ===
- Larry Whitely, Music Director (1980
- Richard Weinberg, Music Director (1981-1988)
- Craig Carnahan, Interim Music Director (1988-1990)
- David Lohman, Music Director (1990-1994)
- Craig Carnahan, Artistic Director (1994-2000
- Dr. Stan Hill, Artistic Director (2000-2012)
- Dr. Ben Riggs, Artistic Director (2012-2017)
- Dr. Gerald Gurss, Artistic Director (2018-present)

=== Executive Directors ===
- Joann Usher (2000-2007)
- Jon Lewis (2007-2009)
- Jeff Heine (2009-2019)
- Kevin Stocks (2019-2024)
- Dennis Whipple (2025-present)

== CDs ==
- Hand in Hand (1995)
- Sing Out! (1996)
- Holiday Fever (1998 cassette)
- Sing We Joyously Noël (1999)
- The Rainbow Connection (2000)
- Angels (2002)
- Metamorphosis (2004)
- What Sweeter Music (2004)
- Bang! Bang! The Music of Cher (2005)
- The Great Southern US Sing-Out Tour (2006)
- The 25th Anniversary Collection (2006)
- LifeSongs (2010)
- Out of My Range and Other Age-Related Performance Issues (2012)
- They Sang to Me (2012, digital download only)
- Joy (2014)

== DVDs ==
- Oliver Button Is a Star* (1999)
- Through a Glass, Darkly (2008)
