= Bill Pursell =

American musician (1926–2020)

William Whitney Pursell (June 9, 1926 – September 3, 2020) was an American composer and onetime session pianist. He had a brief but successful career as a pop musician before continuing on as a session player. Pursell is best known for the top ten hit "Our Winter Love."

== Life ==
Pursell was born in Oakland, California, and raised in Tulare. He studied composition at The Peabody Institute of Music in Baltimore and arranged for the U.S. Air Force Band while serving in World War II. Pursell studied classical composition under Howard Hanson at the Eastman School of Music and earned a master's degree in composition in the mid-fifties. His symphonic poem "Christ Looking Over Jerusalem" (the first movement of "Three Biblical Scenes for Orchestra") was the inaugural recipient of the Edward B. Benjamin Prize in 1953. Later that decade, he worked with the Nashville Symphony Orchestra and taught at Tennessee State University and Vanderbilt University.

In 1962, he signed with Columbia Records, and the hit single "Our Winter Love" was released that year, which hit No. 9 on the Billboard Hot 100, in addition to hitting No. 4 on the Easy Listening chart and No. 20 on the R&B Singles chart. A full-length album entitled Our Winter Love was released the following year. The album reached #15 on the Billboard 200 on the strength of the popularity of the title track. The arrangements for the album were made by Bill Justis and Pursell, and the orchestra was conducted by Grady Martin.

His follow-up single "Loved" reached Billboard position 121. Pursell later recorded for Epic, Henry Stone's Alston, and Dot, but never hit the pop charts again. He played piano on many of Johnny Cash's albums in the 1960s, and worked as a session musician and arranger for Patsy Cline, Johnny Paycheck, Hoover, Joan Baez, Eric Andersen, Scotty Moore, J.J. Cale, Willie Nelson, Dan Fogelberg, and others. In 1985, Pursell was named Composer of the Year by the Tennessee Music Teachers Association.

Pursell became a member of the faculty of the School of Music at Belmont University in Nashville, Tennessee, in 1980. In 1996, he completed his Doctor of Musical Arts degree (DMA) at Eastman School of Music in Rochester, New York.

== Death ==
On September 3, 2020, Pursell's daughter, Laura, announced on Facebook that he had died at Vanderbilt Hospital in Nashville after contracting COVID-19 amid the COVID-19 pandemic in Tennessee and developing pneumonia. He was 94.
