= Through a Glass, Darkly (musical) =

Through A Glass, Darkly
- Original Cast: Bryan Fischer as Zack; Justin Scharr as Billy; Paul Brekke as Sebastian
- Music: Michael Shaieb
- Lyrics: Michael Shaieb
- Basis: commissioned work
- Productions: 2008 Twin Cities Gay Men's Chorus

Through A Glass, Darkly is an oratorio for men's chorus and three soloists composed by Michael Shaieb, commissioned by the Twin Cities Gay Men's Chorus. The story concerns the problem of methamphetamine abuse in the gay community. It premiered on March 29, 2008 at the Ted Mann Concert Hall in Minneapolis, and was videotaped for subsequent broadcast on PBS and a DVD released in June 2008.

== Plot ==
Through A Glass, Darkly follows a night in the lives of three young gay men: Sebastian, a burned-out Wall Street stockbroker addicted to crystal meth; Billy, a young man he picks up in a bar and turns on to the drug before seducing him; and Zack, Sebastian's boyfriend, who waits at home wondering what has become of his partner. When Sebastian stays out all night repeating old behavior, Zack resolves that he has had enough and leaves Sebastian, lamenting the end of their relationship yet hopes for Sebastian's recovery.

The three main characters (who are never referred to by name in the lyrics) act out the story, while the remainder of the chorus serves as the classical "Greek chorus," narrating and interpreting the story.

== Original cast ==
- Paul Brekke as Sebastian
- Justin Scharr as Billy
- Bryan Fischer as Zack

== Songs ==
- Opener—Sebastian, Billy, Zack and Chorus
- Stay A While—Sebastian, Billy and Chorus
- Transitions—Chorus
- Just Another Night—Sebastian, Billy, Zack and Chorus
- The Ordinary Things—Chorus
- Makin' It—Chorus, off-stage Announcer
- Let's Pretend—Chorus
- Any Minute Now—Billy, Zack
- Did You Know?—Chorus
- We Hope—Chorus (a capella)
- Messages—Chorus
- What Problem?—Sebastian, Chorus
- If You Only Knew—Zack, Chorus

== Performance Rights ==
Exclusive performance rights were held by the Twin Cities Gay Men's Chorus until August 1, 2008. Subsequent performance rights were available through FatLab Music.

In June 2009, the Gay Men's Chorus of Washington, D.C., performed the East Coast premier at Lisner Auditorium, featuring Tim Tourbin as Sebastian, Philip Lee "Peelee" Clark as Billy, and Justin Bank as Zack. In April 2010, the Philadelphia Gay Men's Chorus performed the show at the Arden Theatre, featuring Matt Geyer as Sebastian, Justin Scott as Billy, and Albert Fernandez as Zack. In June 2010, the New York City Gay Men's Chorus performed it as the centerpiece of its concert, High, featuring Timothy Morrell as Sebastian, Mark Silverstone as Billy, and Michael Osso as Zack.
