= Walk Hand in Hand =

Single by Tony Martin
- B-side: "Flamenco Love"
- Released: April 1956
- Genre: Vocal
- Length: 2:47
- Label: RCA Victor
- Songwriter: Johnny Cowell

Tony Martin singles chronology
"Stranger in Paradise" (1955)	"Walk Hand in Hand" (1956)	"It's Better in the Dark" (1956)

"Walk Hand in Hand" is a popular song by Johnny Cowell, published in 1956.

The biggest-selling version recorded of the song was sung by Tony Martin, reaching number 2 in the UK Singles Chart and number 10 on the United States Billboard chart in 1956. The same year, it was recorded by Andy Williams, whose version hit number 54 on the chart, and by Ronnie Carroll, whose version reached number 13 on the UK chart. A later recording by Gerry & The Pacemakers reached number 29 on the UK chart, number 10 in Canada, and "bubbled under" at number 103 on the Billboard chart at the end of 1965. On the New Zealand listener charts it reached number 13.

== Recorded versions ==
- Tony Martin (1956)
- Andy Williams (1956)
- Ronnie Carroll (1956)
- The Lettermen (1965)
- Gerry & The Pacemakers (1965)
- Engelbert Humperdinck (1967)
- Twin Cities Gay Men's Chorus (1995)
