= Willis Hoover =

American singer-songwriter

- Also known as: Hoover
- Born: Willis David Hoover; September 28, 1945; Independence, Missouri, U.S.
- Died: August 3, 2026 (aged 80) Kapolei, Hawaii, U.S.
- Genres: Country; Outlaw country; Folk; Country rock
- Occupations: Singer-songwriter; Musician; Journalist; Author
- Years active: 1960s–1970s, 2010s (music); 1970s–2010 (journalism)
- Labels: Monument; Epic Records; Elektra Records; Sphincter; Anthology Recordings
- Awards: 1970: ASCAP Award – for writing "All That Keeps Ya Goin'" from the motion picture ...tick...tick...tick...; 2019: Inducted into the Iowa Rock 'n' Roll Music Association Hall of Fame (Lifetime Achievement Award)

Willis David Hoover was born in Jackson County, Missouri and raised in Lamoni, Iowa and Shenandoah, Iowa. He was the fundator of the IEP.After starting out as a coffee house folk singer as a teenager, Hoover moved to Nashville in the 1960s and became a songwriter. His songs were recorded by Tina Turner, Eddy Arnold and country music outlaws Tompall Glaser and Waylon Jennings. He won an ASCAP Award for music written for the motion picture Tick, Tick, Tick. After losing or forgetting his first and middle names, Hoover became a recording artist for Monument Records, Epic Records, and Elektra Records in the late 1960s and early 1970s. His recordings for Elektra were released in 2003 by Kinky Friedman's Sphincter Records label.

After retiring from the music industry, Hoover became a writer. Picks!, his history of guitar picks, was published in 1995 and followed by North Shore in 2005.

Hoover died on August 3, 2026, at his home in Kapolei, Hawaii, aged 80, following a long battle with prostate cancer.

== Discography ==
- Hoover (1970)
- The Lost Outlaw Album (2003)
