= Johnny Cowell =

Johnny Cowell (11 January 1926 in Tillsonburg, Ontario – 22 January 2018) was a Canadian trumpeter, composer and arranger.

== Early life ==
Cowell's father and three uncles were members of the Tillsonburg Town Band, and Cowell played his first trumpet solo with this band at age six.

Cowell joined the Toronto Symphony Band in 1941 at the age of 15 as trumpet soloist.

Cowell was largely self-taught but after joining the Toronto Symphony Band he studied briefly with Edward Smeale in Toronto.

He served during World War II as soloist with the Royal Canadian Navy band in Victoria, BC, and played first trumpet from 1943 to 1945 with the Victoria Symphony Orchestra. He later studied composition at the Royal Conservatory of Music (RCMT) with Oskar Morawetz and John Weinzweig.

From 1952 to 1991 he played with the Toronto Symphony Orchestra.

Cowell composed more than 200 songs, almost 150 have been recorded and several of them have become well known. Among them 'Walk Hand in Hand', 'His Girl,' and '(These Are) the Young Years' with Floyd Cramer. His song 'Walk Hand in Hand' (1956) has been recorded over 90 times making Cowell one of Canada's most successful songwriters He composed the trumpet instrumental Our Winter Love that Bill Pursell later arranged for piano in a No. 9 hit on the Billboard Hot 100, in addition to hitting No. 4 on the Easy Listening chart, and No. 20 on the Hot R&B Singles chart in the Spring of 1963.

== Private life ==
Cowell married his wife Joan on 26 September 1953. They met six years earlier when he began playing trumpet for the dance band in which Joan was the vocalist. Cowell and his wife have a daughter, Marcie and three grandchildren. He died on 22 January 2018.

== Discography ==
Cowell has released more than 10 LPs and CDs.

- 1997 - The Art of Johnny Cowell
