= His Girl =

- Cover of the 1966 Canadian single

Single by The Guess Who
- B-side: "It's My Pride"
- Released: December 1966 (Canada and UK); February 1967 (US)
- Recorded: 1966
- Genre: Rock
- Length: 3:04
- Label: Quality Records 1863 (Canada); King Records 1044 (UK); Amy Records 976 (US)
- Songwriter(s): Johnny Cowell
- Producer(s): Bob Burns, John Edwards

The Guess Who singles chronology
"And She's Mine" (1966)	"His Girl" (1966)	"Pretty Blue Eyes" (1967)

"His Girl" is a song written by Johnny Cowell and performed by The Guess Who. In its original recorded version, it reached #19 in Canada. A remixed version, with an overdubbed string section and other embellishments, reached #45 in the United Kingdom in 1967. The song was also released in the United States as a single in February 1967, but it did not chart.

The song was produced by Bob Burns, with production on the overdubbed UK version being credited to both Burns and John Edwards.

The B-side "It's My Pride" was included on the 2001 box set Nuggets II: Original Artyfacts from the British Empire and Beyond, 1964–1969 and on the 2005 German release Beatschuppen: Essential Club Music From The 60s .
