= Ian Budge =

British political scientist

Ian Budge (born October 21, 1936) is a political scientist who has pioneered the use of quantitative methods in studying party democracy across countries. Currently Emeritus Professor of the Department of Government, University of Essex he has been Professor at the European University Institute, Florence (1982-5). and visiting professor at various institutions in five other countries.

He graduated in history from the University of Edinburgh in 1959 and received his PhD in political science at Yale University (1967). After teaching at Edinburgh (1962-4) and Strathclyde Universities (1963-66) he moved to Essex, rising from Lecturer to Reader and Professor (1976). He founded the Essex Summer Schools in Social Science Data Analysis (1968–73) and was Director of the European Consortium for Political Research (1979–83), besides being Chairman of the Essex Department and Graduate Director several times

Budge was founding Director of the Manifesto Research Project (now MARPOR at the Wissenschaftzentrum, Berlin) which has quantified the published election programmes of all significant political parties in around 50 post-war democracies, allowing their policies to be mapped and systematically related to party actions in government. Seminal publications from this research have been:-

- Ian Budge et al. Ideology, Strategy and Party Change, (Cambridge University Press, 1987, 2008)
- Ian Budge et al. Ideology, Party Factionalism and Policy Change: An Integrated Dynamic Theory (British Journal of Political Science 40, 2010, 781–804)
- Ian Budge (with various authors) Mapping Policy Preferences (Oxford University Press, 2001, 2006, 2013: winner of American Political Science Association Award, 2003).

Budge has also pioneered other areas of political research, anticipating the autonomous development of Scottish politics in Scottish Political Behaviour (London, Longman 1966) with Derek Urwin, developments in voting behaviour in Party Identification and Beyond (London, Wiley 1976) ed. with Ivor Crewe and Dennis Farlie: the saliency theory of party competition (with Farlie) in Explaining and Predicting Elections (London Allen and Unwin, 1983): and direct democracy in The New Challenge of Direct Democracy (Cambridge, Polity 1996). A book with Hans Keman, Michael McDonald and Paul Pennings, Organizing Democratic Choice (Oxford University Press, 2012) presents a comprehensive theory of how democratic processes work, and tests it against evidence from 25 post-war democracies. This has been further developed in Politics: A Unified Introduction to How Democracy Works (London and New York, Routledge 2019). An accessible text for all levels.

These achievements have been recognised in essays by leading scholars in a volume reviewing his work (Democratic Politics and Party Competition, ed. Judith Bara and Albert Weale, London Routledge 2006) as well as by a number of research awards over his career. The citation written by an international jury for his European Achievement Award (2013) noted his ‘outstanding contribution to European Political Science… through international research projects… scholarly production and institutional service.’

Budge has recently applied his professional knowledge to getting action on the growing climate crisis in Kick-starting Government Action against Climate Change: Effective Political Strategies (London and New York, Routledge 2021).

== Selected publications ==
- Ian Budge, Kick-starting Government Action against Climate Change: Effective Political Strategies (London and New York, Routledge 2021)
- Ian Budge, Politics: A Unified Introduction to How Democracy Works (London and New York, Routledge 2019)
- Ian Budge, (with Hans Keman, Michael D McDonald and Paul Pennings) Organizing Democratic Choice: Party Representation Over Time (Oxford OUP, 2012).
- Ian Budge (with Lawrence Ezrow and Michael D McDonald) Ideology, Party Factionalism and Policy Change British Journal of Political Science 40 (2010) 781-804
- Ian Budge (with H-D Klingemann, Andrea Volkens, Judith Bara et al.) Mapping Policy Preferences: Estimates for Parties, Governments and Electors (Oxford OUP 2001; various reprints)
- Ian Budge The New Challenge of Direct Democracy (Cambridge, Polity 1996)
- Budge, I. and J.E. Keman Parties and Democracy: Coalition Formation and Government Functioning in 22 Democracies (Oxford OUP 1990: paperback 1993)
- Ian Budge (with RI Hofferbert) Mandates and Policy Outputs: US Party Platforms and Federal Expenditures American Political Science Review 84 (1990) 111-131
- Ian Budge, David Robertson, DJ Hearl et al. Ideology, Strategy and Party Change (Cambridge CUP 1987: reprinted 2008)
- Ian Budge and DJ Farlie Explaining and Predicting Elections (London, Allen and Unwin 1983)
- Ian Budge, Ivor Crewe, DJ Farlie et al. Party Identification and Beyond (London, Wiley 1976)
- Ian Budge, Jeremy Bentham: A Re-Evaluation in Light of Modern Empirical Research Political Studies, Vol 19 (March 1971) 33-53
- Ian Budge and Derek Urwin Scottish Political Behaviour (London, Longman 1966)
