= 2026 Laurence Olivier Awards =

2026 edition of the annual UK theatre awards

- Date: 12 April 2026
- Location: Royal Albert Hall
- Hosted by: Nick Mohammed
- Most wins: Paddington (7)
- Most nominations: Into the Woods and Paddington (11)

Television/radio coverage
- Network: BBC Two (television); BBC Radio 2 (radio)

The 2026 Laurence Olivier Awards were held on 12 April 2026 at the Royal Albert Hall. It recognised excellence in professional theatre in London, as determined by the Society of London Theatre, and marked the 50th anniversary of the Laurence Olivier Awards. British comedian and actor Nick Mohammed hosted the ceremony for the first time. The nominations were announced on 5 March 2026, with Into the Woods and Paddington each receiving the most nominations with eleven. Paddington received the most awards with seven, tying for the record number of Olivier awards won by a musical with Sunset Boulevard (2024), Cabaret (2022), Hamilton (2018) and Matilda (2012).

== Event calendar ==
- 3 December 2025: Ceremony date set for 12 April 2026 and venue confirmed as Royal Albert Hall.
- 17 February 2026: Eligibility cut-off.
- 24 February 2026: Industry Recognition and Outstanding Contribution recipients announced.
- 3 March 2026: Nick Mohammed announced as host.
- 5 March 2026: Nominations announced by Mohammed.
- 6 March 2025: Special Award recipient announced.
- 12 April 2026: Award ceremony scheduled.

== Winners and nominees ==
The nominations were announced in 24 categories on 5 March 2026. The ceremony were held at the Royal Albert Hall in London on April 12, 2026, hosted by Nick Mohammed. James Graham's Punch won two prizes including Best New Play and Laurence Olivier Award for Best Actress in a Supporting Role to Julie Hesmondhalgh as Joan. Paddington won seven prizes out of 11 nominations, including Best New Musical, Best Actor in a Musical for James Hameed and Arti Shah. Rachel Zegler won the Best Actress in a Musical as Eva Perón in Evita. Its choreographer, Fabian Aloise, also won the Best Theatre Choreographer. Evita was also nominated for Best Musical Revival, but the award went to Into the Woods, which had 11 nominations and also won Best Lighting Design to Roland Horvath and Aideen Malone. All My Sons won two prizes including Best Revival and Best Actor in a Supporting Role to Paapa Essiedu as Chris Keller.

Winners are listed first, highlighted in boldface, and indicated with a double dagger (‡).

| Best New Play | Best New Musical |
|---|---|
| **Punch by James Graham – Young Vic and Apollo Theatre**‡; 1536 by Ava Pickett – Almeida Theatre; Inter Alia by Suzie Miller – National Theatre Lyttelton; Kenrex by Jack Holden and Ed Stambollouian – The Other Palace | **Paddington – Savoy Theatre**‡; Here We Are – National Theatre Lyttelton; Shucked – Regent's Park Open Air Theatre; The Unlikely Pilgrimage of Harold Fry – Theatre Royal Haymarket |
| Best Revival | Best Musical Revival |
| **All My Sons – Wyndham's Theatre**‡; Arcadia – The Old Vic; Much Ado About Nothing – Theatre Royal Drury Lane; The Seagull – Barbican Theatre | **Into the Woods – Bridge Theatre**‡; American Psycho – Almeida Theatre; Evita – London Palladium; The Producers – Garrick Theatre |
| Best Entertainment or Comedy Play | Best Family Show |
| **Oh, Mary! by Cole Escola – Trafalgar Theatre**‡; The Comedy about Spies by Henry Lewis and Henry Shields – Noël Coward Theatre; Every Brilliant Thing by Duncan Macmillan with Jonny Donahoe – @sohoplace; Paranormal Activity by Levi Holloway (based on original text by Oren Peli) – Ambassadors Theatre | **The Boy at the Back of the Class – Rose Theatre**‡; The Boy with Wings – Polka Theatre; The Firework-Maker's Daughter – Polka Theatre; The Three Little Pigs – Unicorn Theatre |
| Best Actor | Best Actress |
| **Jack Holden as Performer in Kenrex – The Other Palace**‡; Bryan Cranston as Joe Keller in All My Sons – Wyndham's Theatre; Sean Hayes as Oscar Levant in Good Night, Oscar – Barbican Theatre; Tom Hiddleston as Benedick in Much Ado About Nothing – Theatre Royal, Drury Lane; David Shields as Jacob Dunne in Punch – Young Vic and Apollo Theatre | **Rosamund Pike as Jessica Parks in Inter Alia – National Theatre Lyttelton**‡; Cate Blanchett as Irina Arkadina in The Seagull – Barbican Theatre; Marianne Jean-Baptiste as Kate Keller in All My Sons – Wyndham's Theatre; Julia McDermott as Stacey in Weather Girl – Soho Theatre; Rosie Sheehy as Her in Guess How Much I Love You? – Jerwood Downstairs, Royal Court Theatre |
| Best Actor in a Musical | Best Actress in a Musical |
| **James Hameed as Young Man / Paddington (voice and remote puppeteer) and Arti Shah as Paddington (on stage) in Paddington – Savoy Theatre**‡; Marc Antolin as Leo Bloom in The Producers – Garrick Theatre; Andy Nyman as Max Bialystock in The Producers – Garrick Theatre; Jamie Parker as The Baker in Into the Woods – Bridge Theatre; Diego Andres Rodriguez as Che in Evita – London Palladium | **Rachel Zegler as Eva Perón in Evita – London Palladium**‡; Katie Brayben as The Baker's Wife in Into the Woods – Bridge Theatre; Danielle Fiamanya and Georgina Onuorah as Fiona Maclaren in Brigadoon – Regent's Park Open Air Theatre; Jane Krakowski as Marianne Brink in Here We Are – Royal National Theatre; Jenna Russell as Maureen Fry in The Unlikely Pilgrimage of Harold Fry – Theatre Royal Haymarket |
| Best Actor in a Supporting Role | Best Actress in a Supporting Role |
| **Paapa Essiedu as Chris Keller in All My Sons – Wyndham's Theatre**‡; Hammed Animashaun as Mugsy in Dealer's Choice – Donmar Warehouse; Zachary Hart as Semyon Medvedenko in The Seagull – Barbican Theatre; Zachary Hart as Reg in Stereophonic – Duke of York's Theatre; Giles Terera as Mary's Husband in Oh, Mary! – Trafalgar Theatre | **Julie Hesmondhalgh as Joan in Punch – Apollo Theatre**‡; Isis Hainsworth as Thomasina Coverley in Arcadia – The Old Vic; Lucy Karczewski as Diana in Stereophonic – Duke of York's Theatre; Hayley Squires as Ann Deever in All My Sons – Wyndham's Theatre; Sophie Thompson as Maria Helliwell in When We Are Married – Donmar Warehouse |
| Best Actor in a Supporting Role in a Musical | Best Actress in a Supporting Role in a Musical |
| **Tom Edden as Mr. Curry in Paddington – Savoy Theatre**‡; Trevor Ashley as Roger De Bris in The Producers – Garrick Theatre; Corbin Bleu as Nick Carraway in The Great Gatsby - London Coliseum; Jo Foster as Jack in Into the Woods – Bridge Theatre; Oliver Savile as The Wolf and Cinderella's Prince in Into the Woods – Bridge Theatre | **Victoria Hamilton-Barritt as Millicent Clyde in Paddington – Savoy Theatre**‡; Tracie Bennett as Woman in Here We Are – Royal National Theatre; Amy Booth-Steel as Lady Sloane in Paddington – Savoy Theatre; Kate Fleetwood as The Witch in Into the Woods – Bridge Theatre; Georgina Onuorah as Lulu in Shucked – Regent's Park Open Air Theatre |
| Best Director | Best Theatre Choreographer |
| **Luke Sheppard for Paddington – Savoy Theatre**‡; Jordan Fein for Into the Woods – Bridge Theatre; Ed Stambollouian for Kenrex – The Other Palace; Lyndsey Turner for 1536 – Almeida Theatre; Ivo van Hove for All My Sons – Wyndham's Theatre | **Fabian Aloise for Evita – London Palladium**‡; Ellen Kane for Paddington – Savoy Theatre; Drew McOnie for Brigadoon – Regent's Park Open Air Theatre; Lynne Page for American Psycho – Almeida Theatre |
| Best Set Design | Best Costume Design |
| **Tom Pye for scenic designing and Ash J Woodward for video designing Paddington – Savoy Theatre**‡; Paul Tate dePoo III for projection designing and scenic designing The Great Gatsby - London Coliseum; Tom Scutt for scenic designing Into the Woods – Bridge Theatre; David Zinn for scenic designing Stereophonic – Duke of York's Theatre | **Gabriella Slade and Tahra Zafar for Paddington – Savoy Theatre**‡; Enver Chakartash for Stereophonic – Duke of York's Theatre; Linda Cho for The Great Gatsby – London Coliseum; Tom Scutt for Into the Woods – Bridge Theatre |
| Best Lighting Design | Best Sound Design |
| **Roland Horvath and Aideen Malone for Into the Woods – Bridge Theatre**‡; Robbie Butler for Punch – Young Vic and Apollo Theatre; Jon Clark for Evita – London Palladium; Joshua Pharo for Kenrex – The Other Palace | **Giles Thomas for Kenrex – The Other Palace**‡; Adam Fisher for Into the Woods – Bridge Theatre; Gareth Owen for Paddington – Savoy Theatre; Ryan Rumery for Stereophonic – Duke of York's Theatre |
Outstanding Musical Contribution
**Chris Fenwick for arranging and music supervising and Sean Hayes for live piano of Rhapsody in Blue in Good Night, Oscar – Barbican Theatre**‡; Matthew Brind for arranging and orchestrating Paddington – Savoy Theatre; Will Butler for orchestrating and songwriting and Justin Craig for orchestrating Stereophonic – Duke of York's Theatre; John Patrick Elliott for Kenrex – The Other Palace
| Best New Dance Production | Best New Opera Production |
| **Into the Hairy by Sharon Eyal, S-E-D – Sadler's Wells**‡; Mimi's Shebeen by KVS and Alesandra Seutin – Sadler's Wells East; Random Taranto by María del Mar Suárez (La Chachi), Dance Umbrella: Change Tempo – The Pit at Barbican; She's Auspicious by Mythili Prakash – Sadler's Wells East | **Dead Man Walking, English National Opera – London Coliseum**‡; The Makropulos Case, Royal Opera – Royal Opera House; Tosca, Royal Opera – Royal Opera House; The Valkyrie, Royal Opera – Royal Opera House |
Best New Production in an Affiliate Theatre
**The Glass Menagerie by Tennessee Williams – Yard Theatre**‡; Ben and Imo by Mark Ravenhill – Orange Tree Theatre; The Ministry of Lesbian Affairs by Iman Qureshi – Kiln Theatre; Miss Myrtle's Garden by Danny James King – Bush Theatre; The Shitheads by Jack Nicholls – Royal Court Theatre
| Special Award | Industry Recognition Award |
| **Elaine Paige**‡ | **Betty Laine**‡; **Linda Tolhurst**‡; **David Wood**‡ |
| Outstanding Contribution for Dance | Outstanding Contribution for Opera |
| **Wayne McGregor**‡ | **Danielle de Niese**‡ |

== Productions with multiple wins and nominations ==
=== Multiple wins ===
The following 6 productions received multiple awards:

- 7: Paddington
- 2: All My Sons, Evita, Into the Woods, Kenrex, Punch

=== Multiple nominations ===
The following 20 productions received multiple nominations:

- 11: Into the Woods, Paddington
- 6: All My Sons, Kenrex, Stereophonic
- 5: Evita
- 4: The Producers, Punch
- 3: The Great Gatsby, Here We Are, The Seagull
- 2: 1536, American Psycho, Arcadia, Brigadoon, Inter Alia, Much Ado About Nothing, Oh, Mary!, Shucked, The Unlikely Pilgrimage of Harold Fry

== See also ==
- 79th Tony Awards
