= Laurence Olivier Award for Best Actor =

Annual award for London theatre

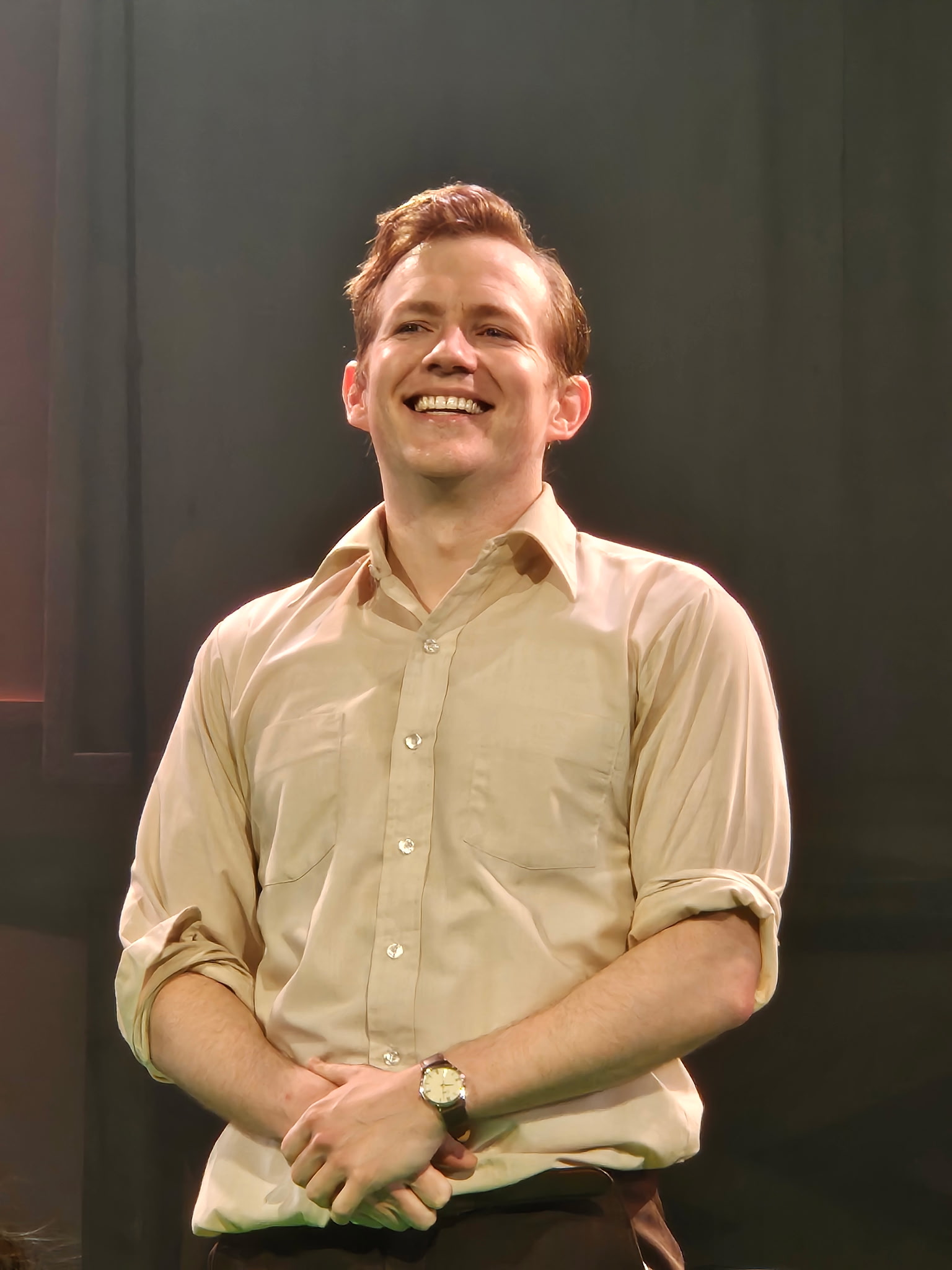
- The 2026 Recipient: Jack Holden
- Awarded for: Best Actor in a Play
- Location: England
- Presented by: Society of London Theatre
- First award: 1985
- Currently held by: Jack Holden for Kenrex (2026)
- Website: officiallondontheatre.com/olivier-awards/

The Laurence Olivier Award for Best Actor in a Play is an annual award presented by the Society of London Theatre in recognition of the "world-class status of London theatre." The awards were established as the Society of West End Theatre Awards in 1976, and renamed in 1984 in honour of English actor and director Laurence Olivier.

This award was introduced in 1985, as Actor of the Year, then retitled to its current name for the 1993 ceremony. Prior to this award, from 1976 to 1984 (and again in 1988), there was a pair of awards given each year for this general category, one for Actor of the Year in a New Play and the other for Actor of the Year in a Revival.

== Winners and nominees ==
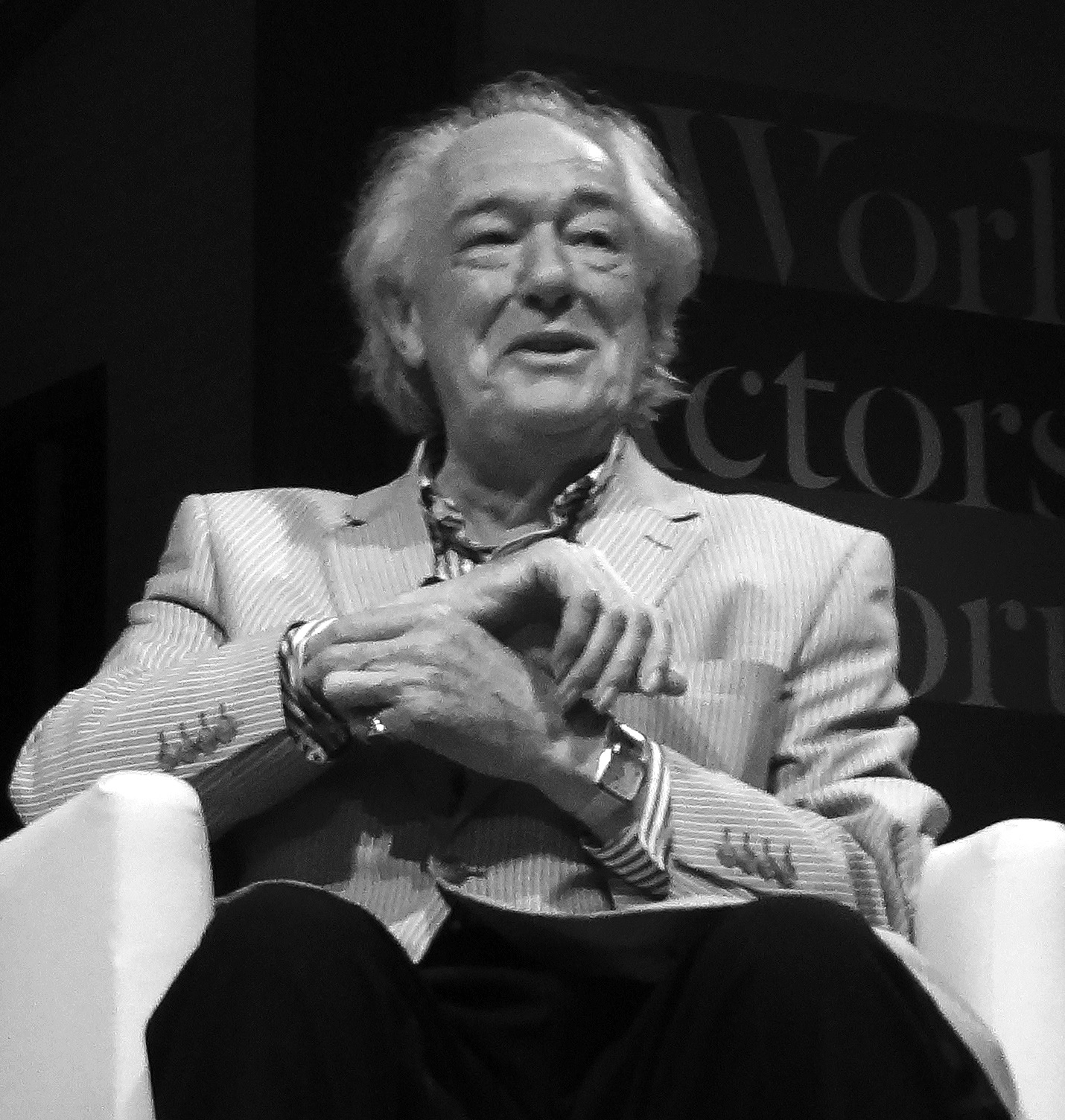
Michael Gambon received 11 nominations in this category winning for A View from the Bridge (1988)

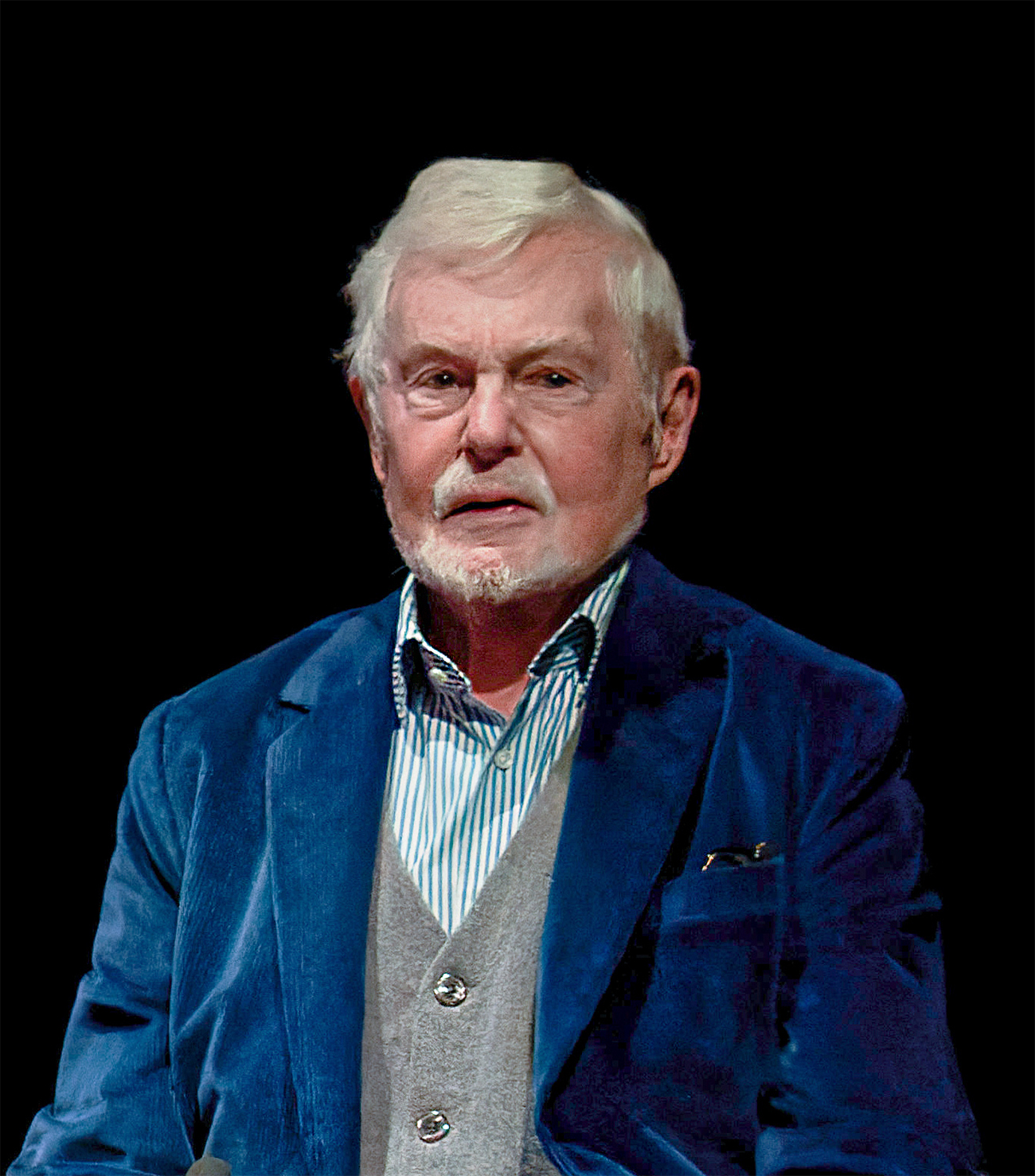
Derek Jacobi won twice for Cyrano de Bergerac (1983), and Twelfth Night (2009)

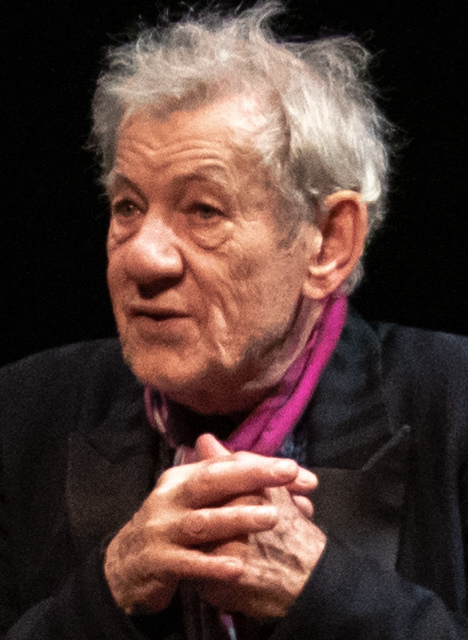
Ian McKellen won this award four times in 1977, 1979, 1984, and 1991

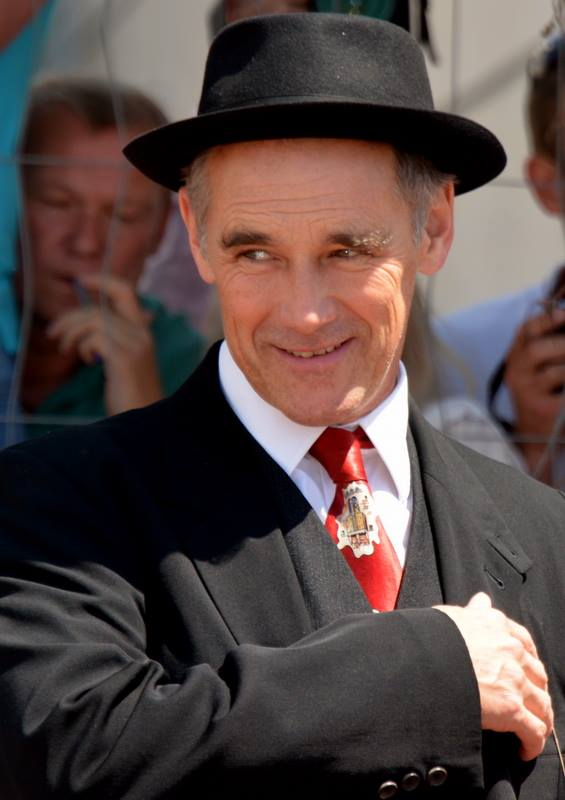
Mark Rylance won this award twice for Much Ado About Nothing (1994), and Jerusalem (2010)

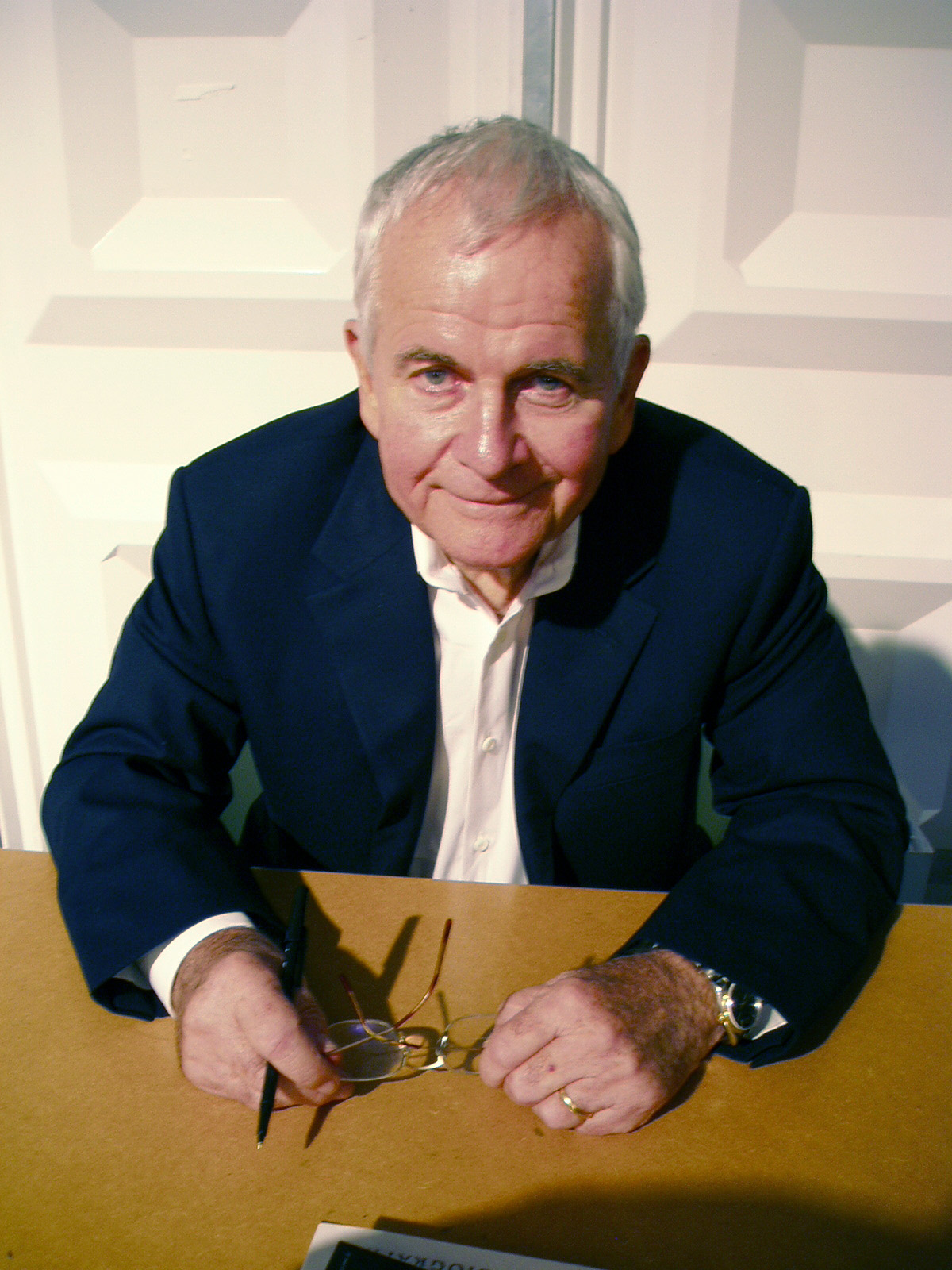
Ian Holm won this award for King Lear (1998)

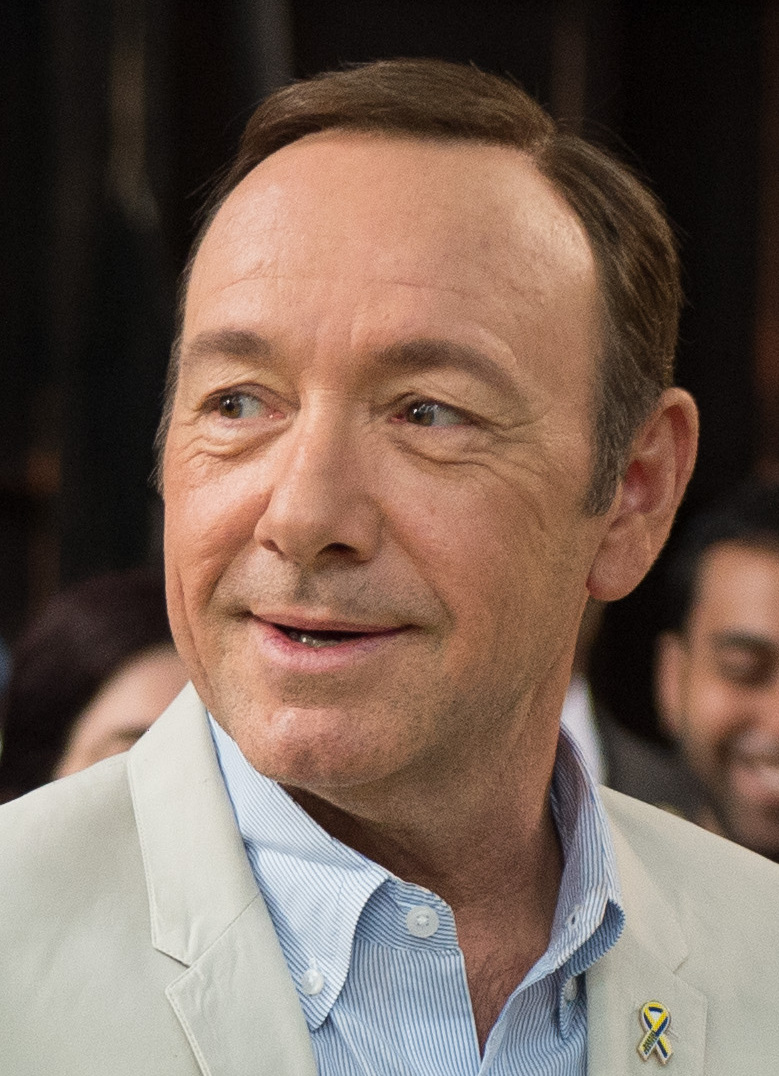
Kevin Spacey won for his role in the play The Iceman Cometh (1999)

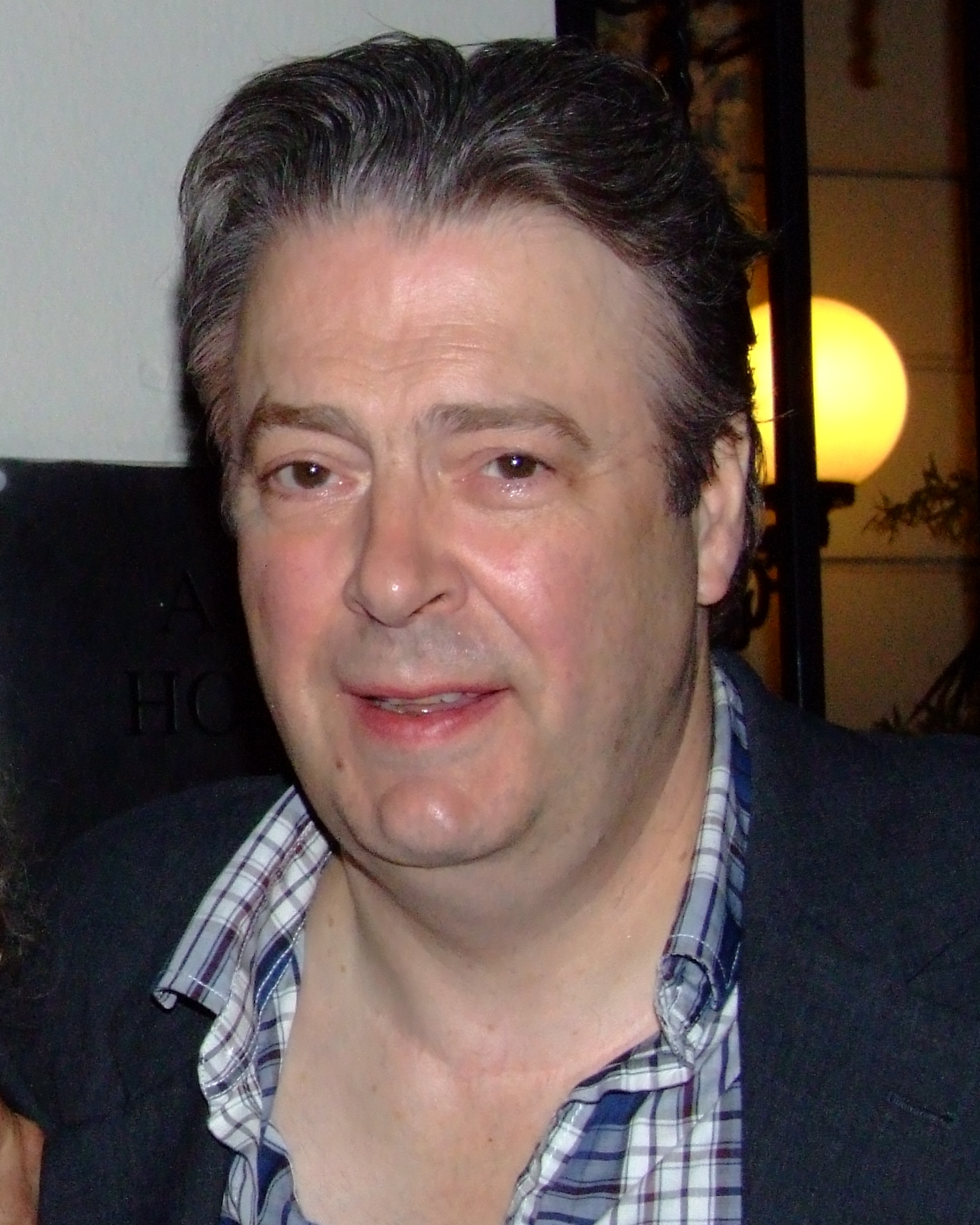
Roger Allam won twice for Privates on Parade (2002) and Henry IV, Part 1 and Part 2 (2011)

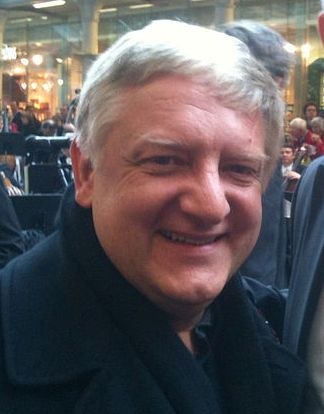
Simon Russell Beale won this award for Uncle Vanya (2003)

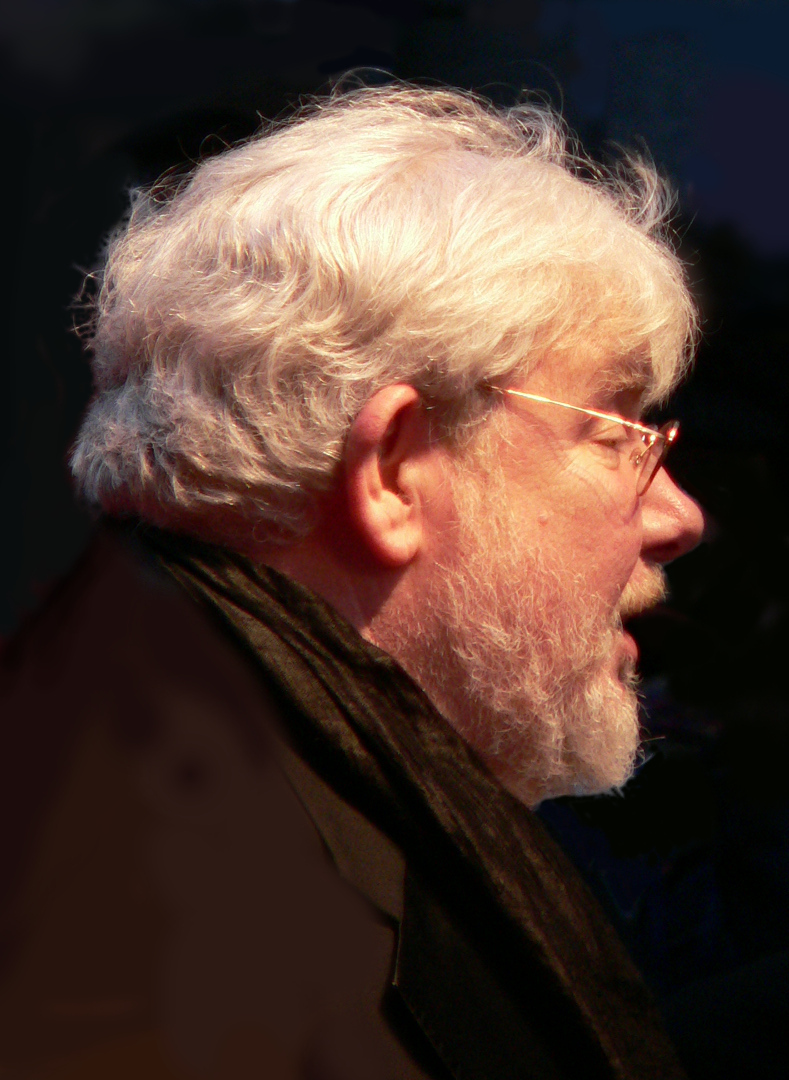
Richard Griffiths won for his role in The History Boys (2005)

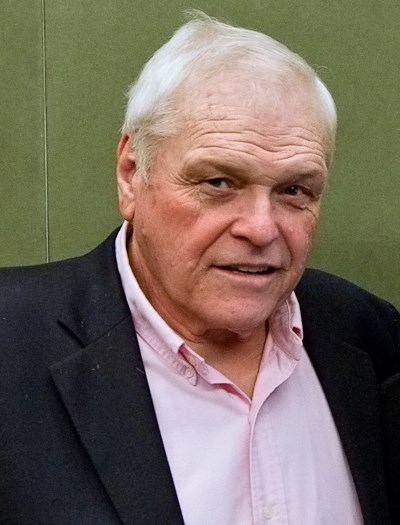
Brian Dennehy won for Death of a Salesman (2006)

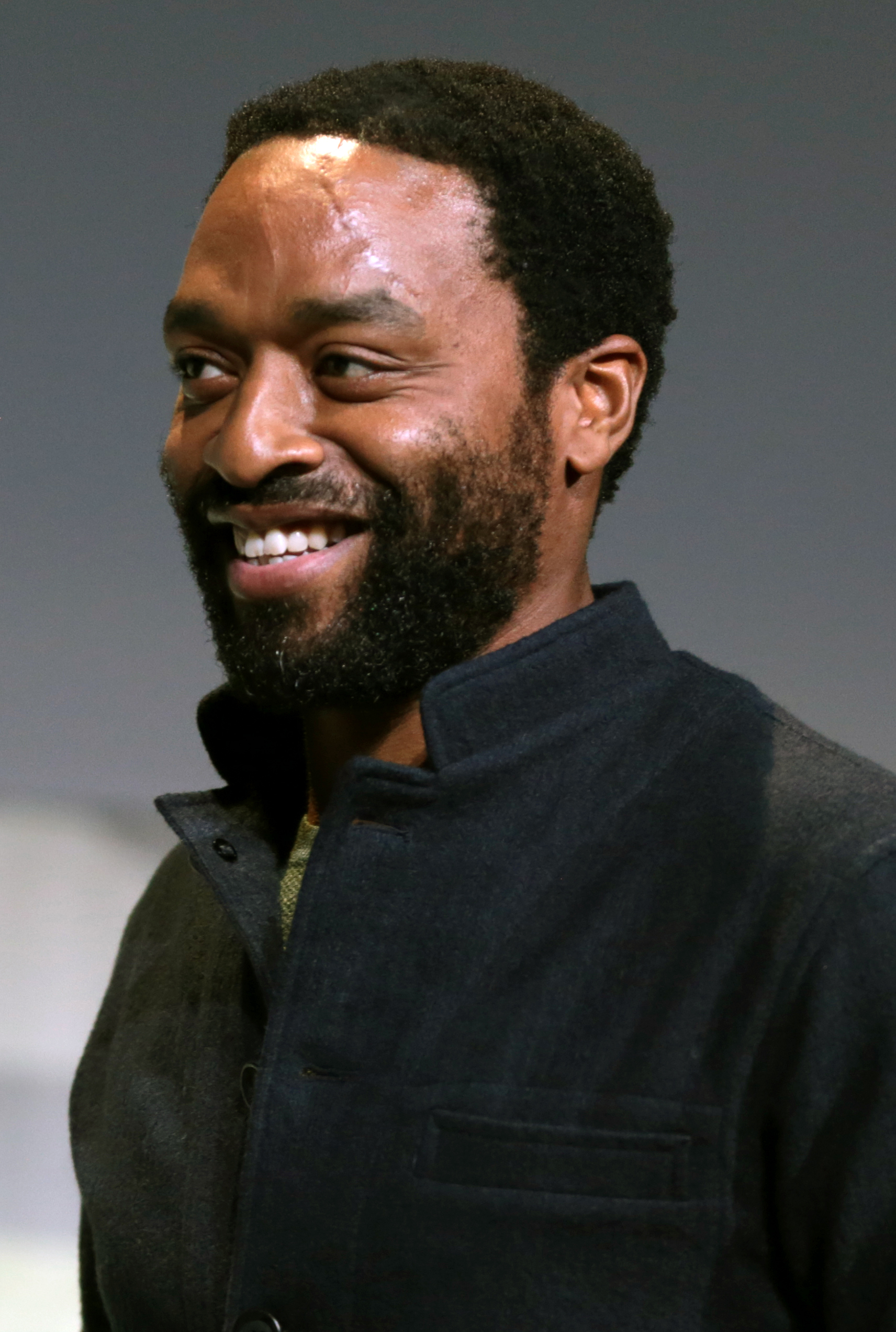
Chiwetel Ejiofor won for Othello (2008)

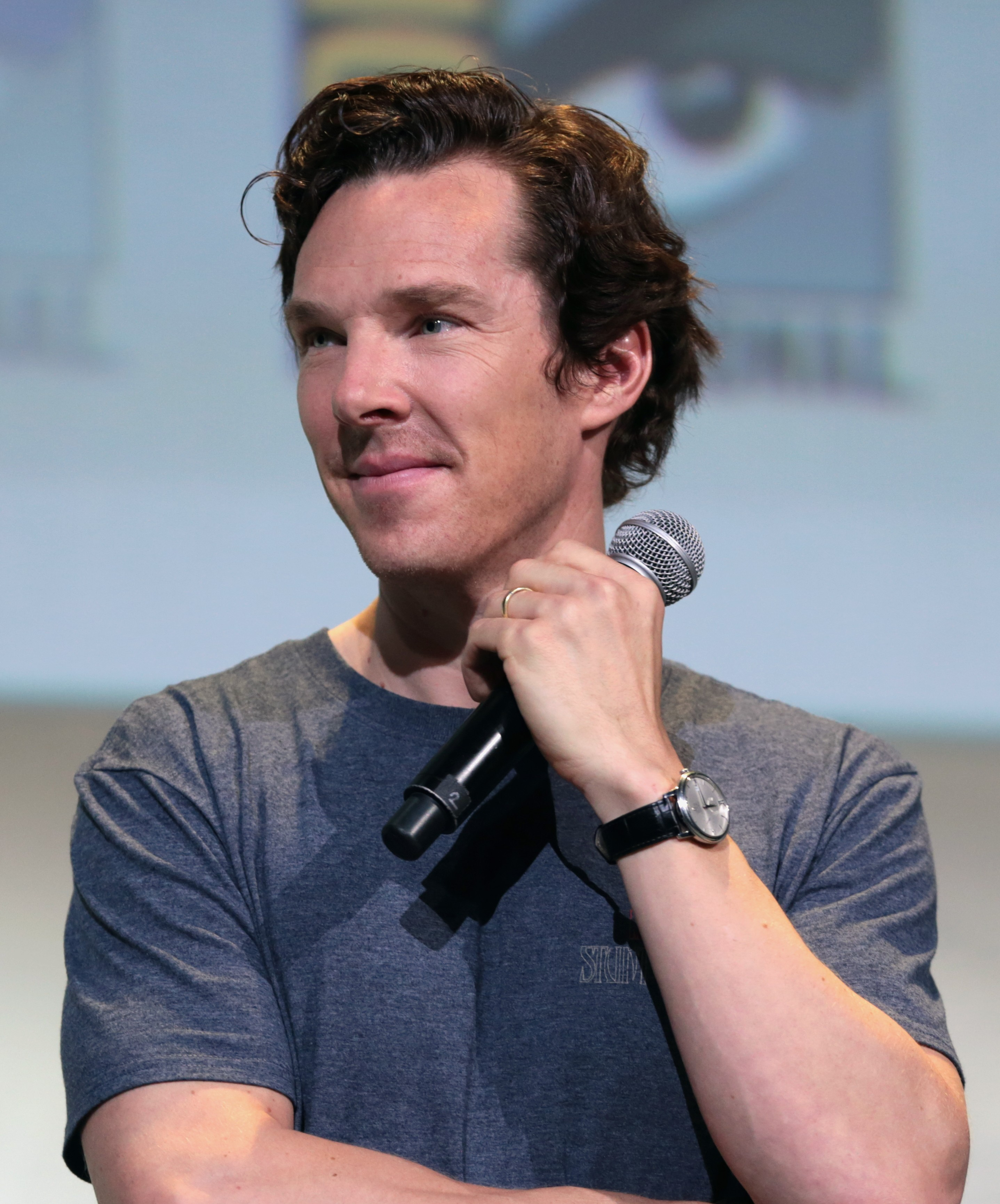
Benedict Cumberbatch won for Frankenstein (2012)

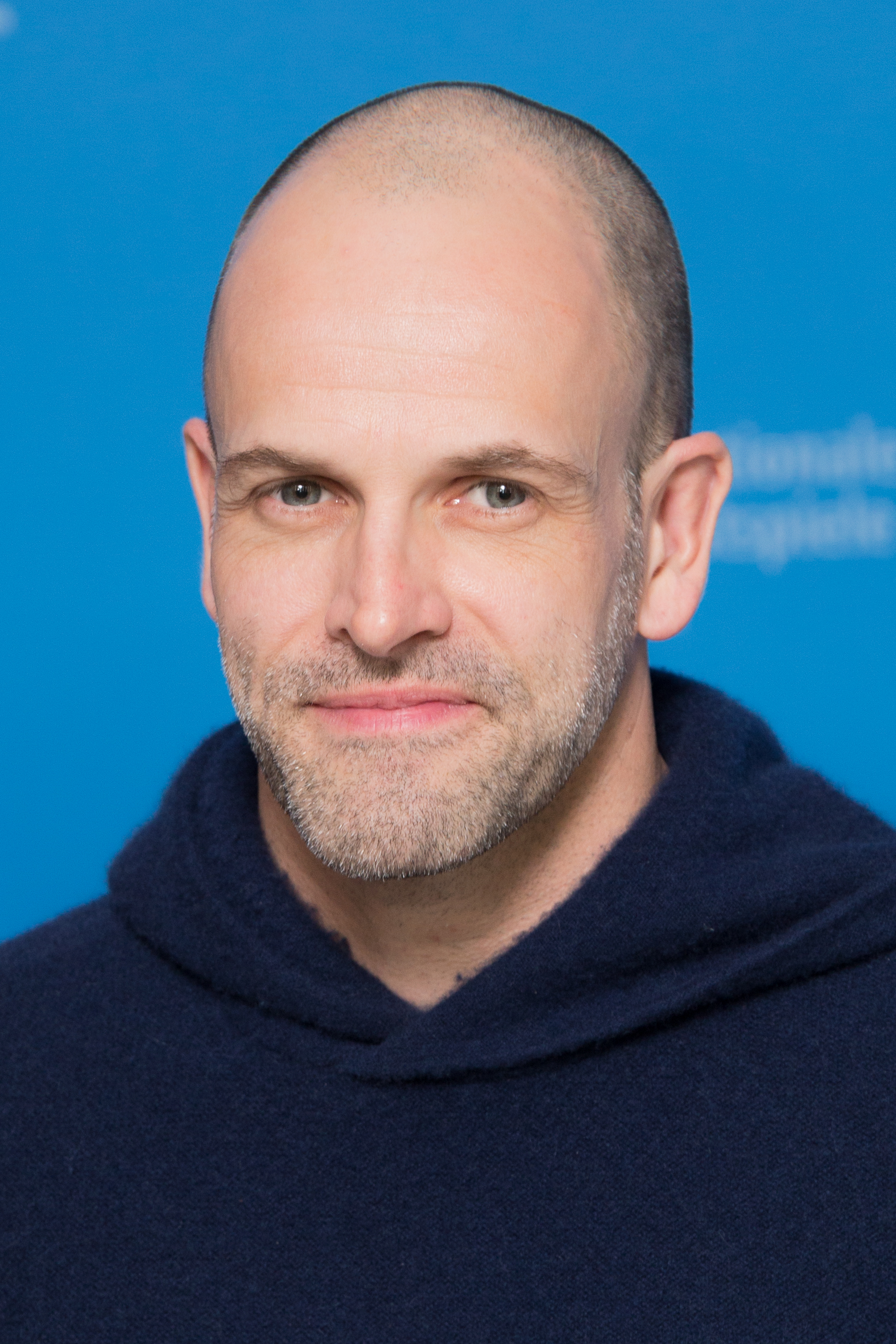
Jonny Lee Miller won with Cumberbatch for Frankenstein (2012)

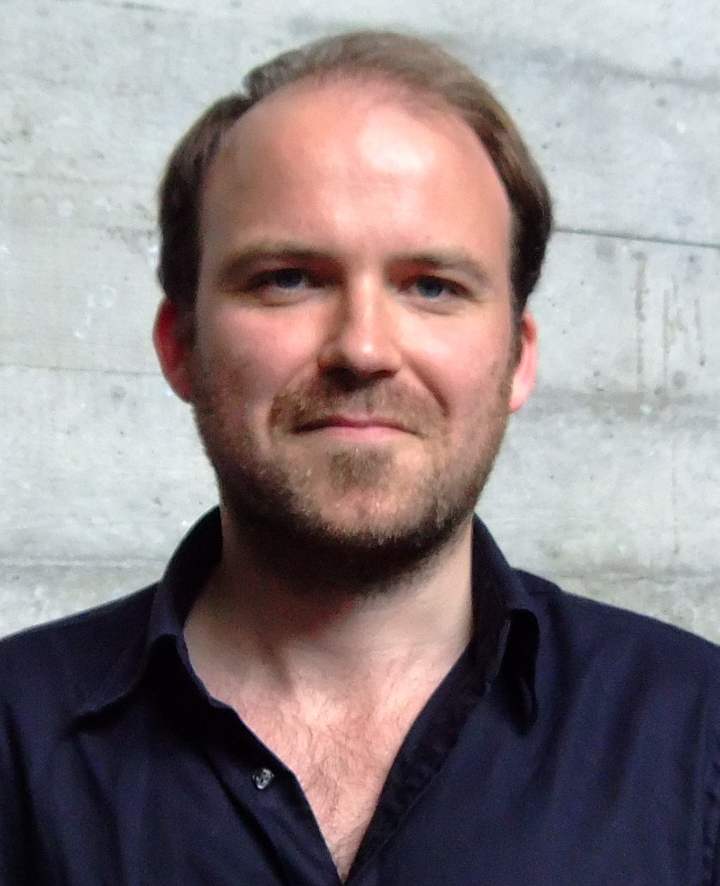
Rory Kinnear won for Othello (2014)

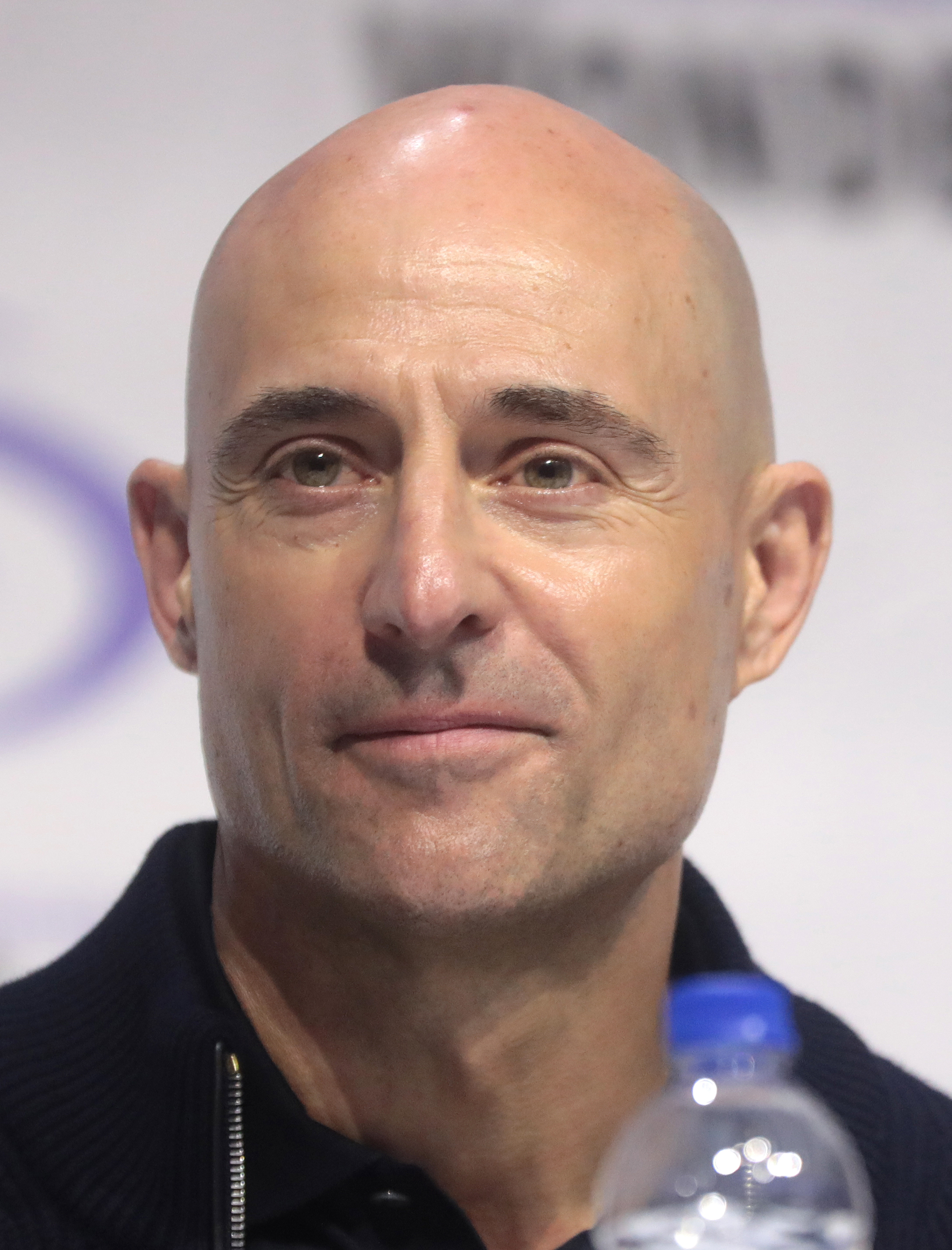
Mark Strong won for A View from the Bridge (2015)

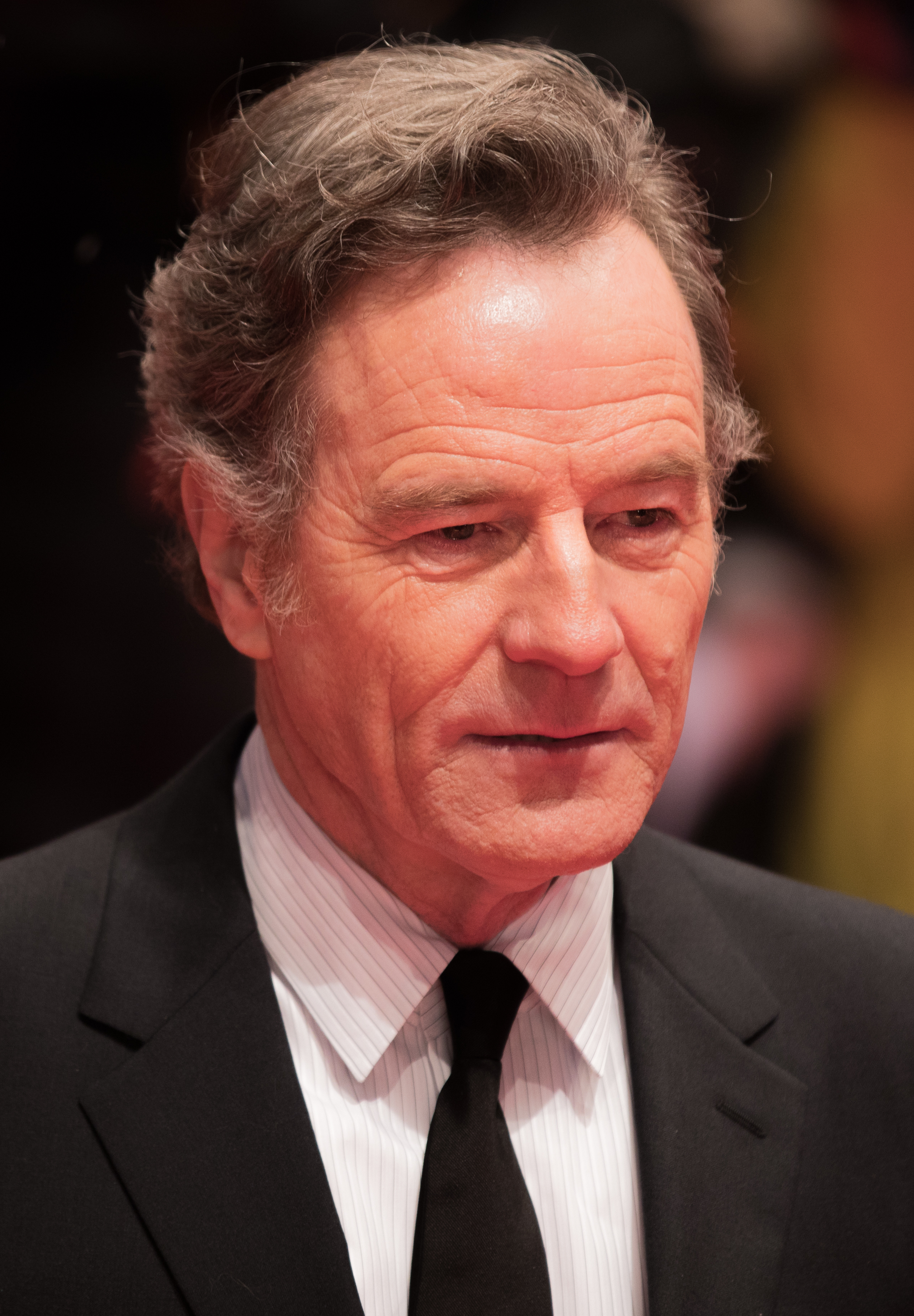
Bryan Cranston won for Network (2018)

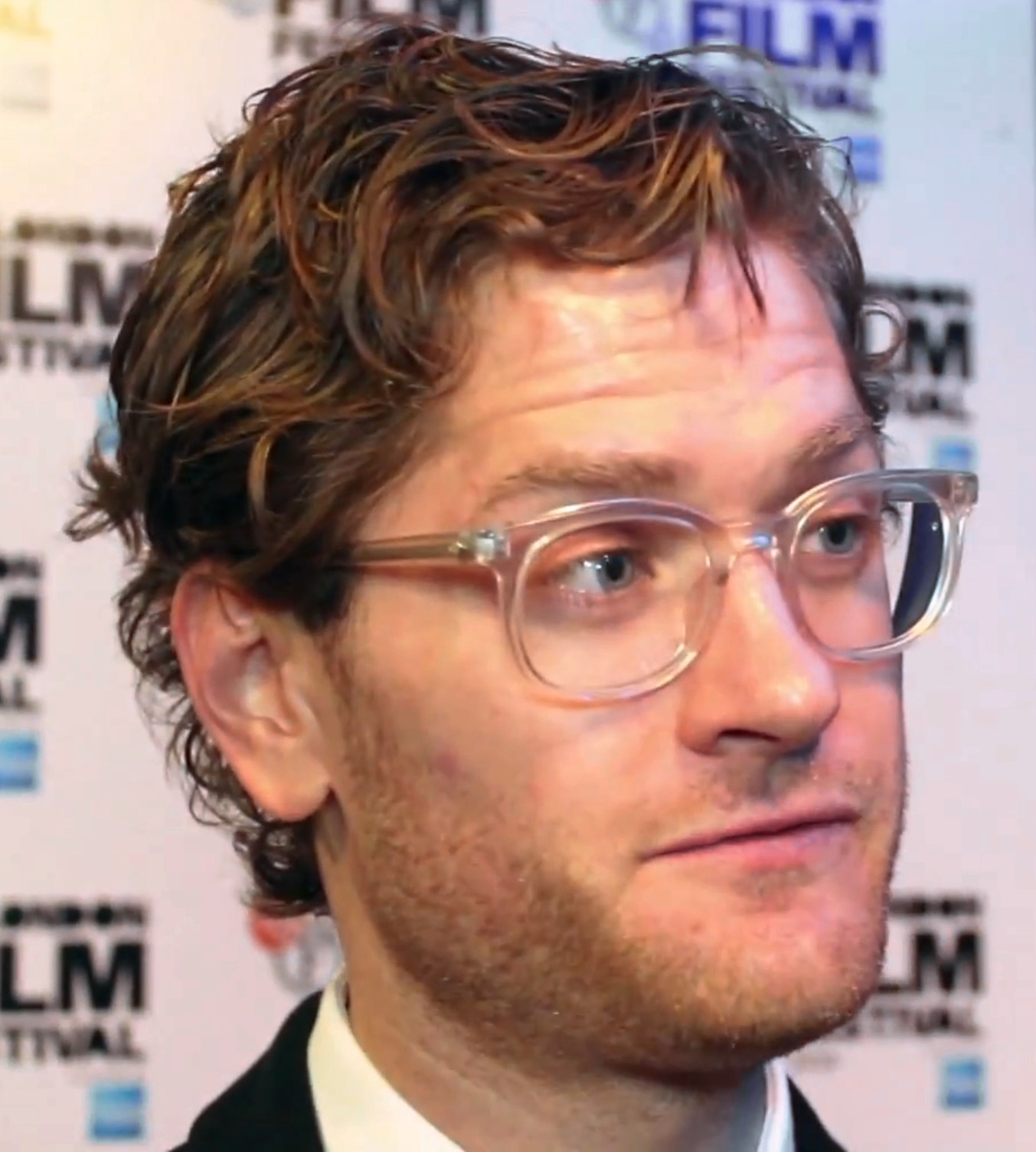
Kyle Soller won for The Inheritance (2019)

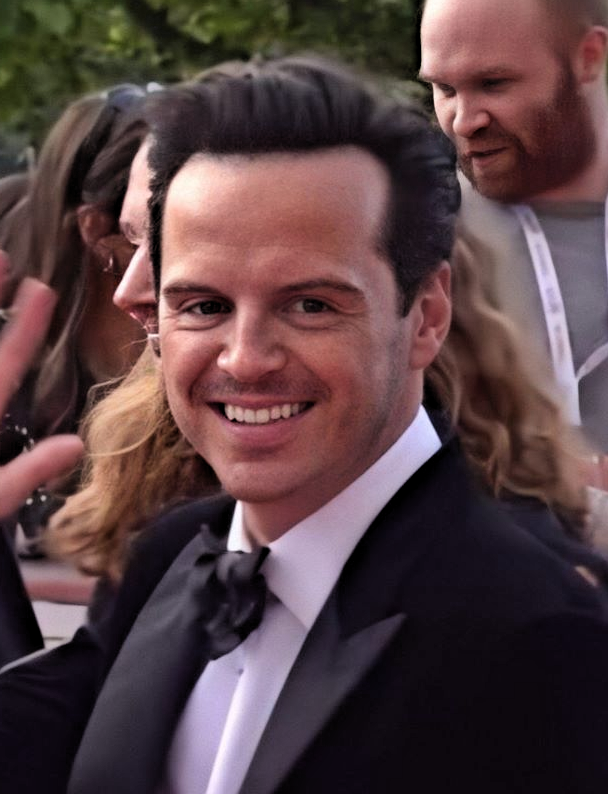
Andrew Scott won for Present Laughter (2020)

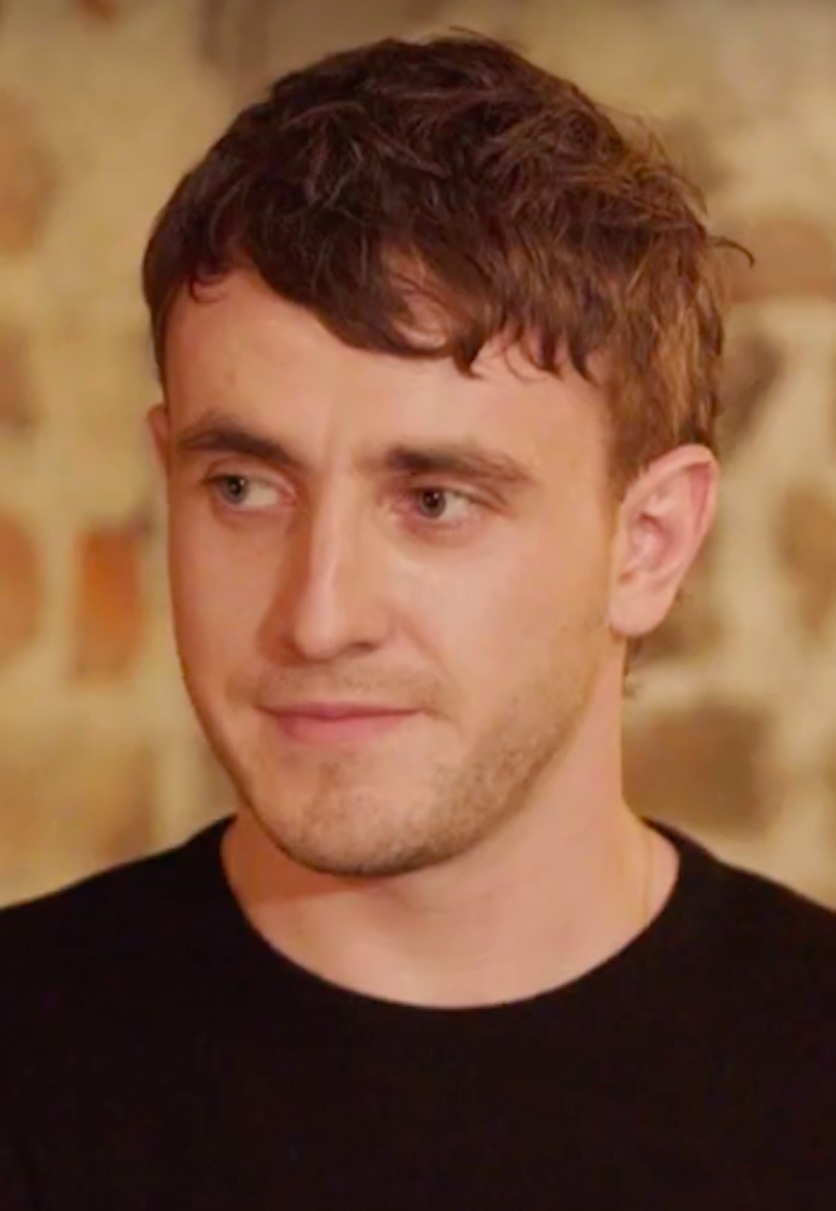
Paul Mescal won for A Streetcar Named Desire (2023)

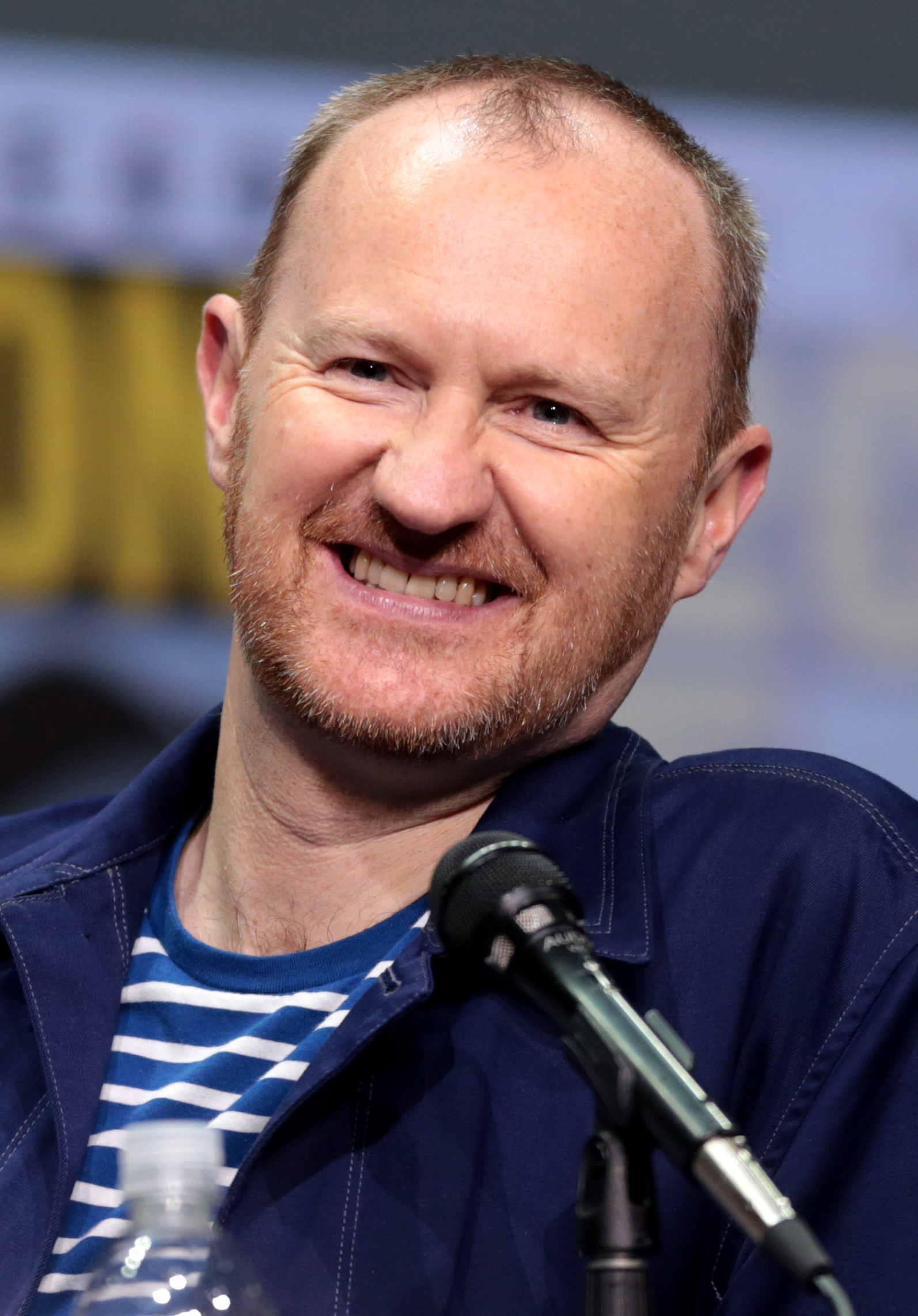
Mark Gatiss won for The Motive and the Cue (2024)

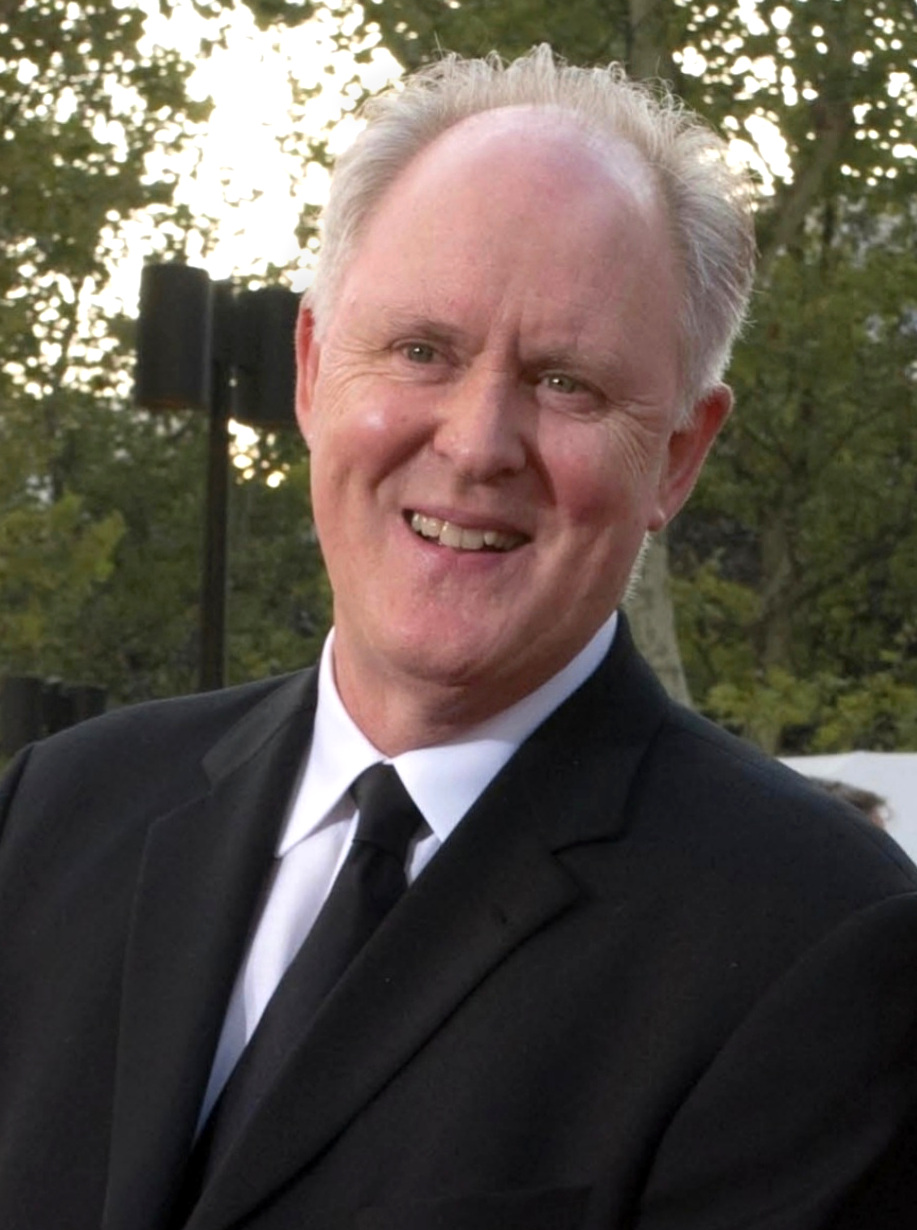
John Lithgow won for Giant (2025)

=== 1980s ===
| Year | Actor | Play | Character |
1985
| 1985 | Antony Sher | Richard III and Torch Song Trilogy | Richard III of England / Arnold Beckoff |
| 1985 | Alun Armstrong | The Crucible and The Winter's Tale | John Proctor / Leontes |
| 1985 | Kenneth Branagh | Henry V | Henry V of England |
| 1985 | Anthony Hopkins | Pravda | Lambert Le Roux |
1986
| 1986 | Albert Finney | Orphans | Harold |
| 1986 | Derek Jacobi | Breaking the Code | Alan Turing |
| 1986 | Ian McKellen | The Cherry Orchard | Lopakhin |
| 1986 | Martin Sheen | The Normal Heart | Ned Weeks |
1987
| 1987 | Michael Gambon | A View from the Bridge | Eddie Carbone |
| 1987 | Tokusaburo Arashi | Medea | Medea |
| 1987 | Hugh Quarshie | The Two Noble Kinsmen, The Great White Hope and The Rover | Arcite / Jack Jefferson / Belville |
| 1987 | Nicholas Woodeson | Sarcophagus and Flight | Bessmertny / Mike Levine |
1989/90
| 1989/90 | Oliver Ford Davies | Racing Demon | The Rev. Lionel Espy |
| 1989/90 | Nigel Hawthorne | Shadowlands | Lewis |
| 1989/90 | Ian McKellen | Othello and Bent | Iago / Max |
| 1989/90 | Michael Pennington | The Wars of the Roses | Various Characters |

=== 1990s ===
| Year | Actor | Play | Character |
1991
| 1991 | Ian McKellen | Richard III | Richard III of England |
| 1991 | Richard Harris | Henry IV | Henry IV, Holy Roman Emperor |
| 1991 | John Malkovich | Burn This | Pale |
| 1991 | Warren Mitchell | The Homecoming | Max |
1992
| 1992 | Nigel Hawthorne | The Madness of George III | George III |
| 1992 | Marcus D'Amico | Angels in America | Louis Ironson |
| 1992 | Robert Lindsay | Becket | Henry II of England |
| 1992 | Ian McKellen | Uncle Vanya | Uncle Vanya |
1993
| 1993 | Robert Stephens | Henry IV, Parts 1 and 2 | Falstaff |
| 1993 | Kenneth Cranham | An Inspector Calls | Inspector Goole |
| 1993 | Paul Eddington | No Man's Land | Spooner |
| 1993 | Paul Scofield | Heartbreak House | Captain Shotover |
1994
| 1994 | Mark Rylance | Much Ado About Nothing | Benedick |
| 1994 | Henry Goodman | Hysteria | Sigmund Freud |
| 1994 | Patrick Stewart | A Christmas Carol | Various Characters |
| 1994 | David Suchet | Oleanna | John |
1995
| 1995 | David Bamber | My Night with Reg | Guy |
| 1995 | James Bolam | Glengarry Glen Ross | Shelly Levene |
| 1995 | Adrian Lester | As You Like It | Rosalind |
| 1995 | Bob Peck | Rutherford and Son | John Rutherford |
1996
| 1996 | Alex Jennings | Peer Gynt | Peer Gynt |
| 1996 | Michael Gambon | Skylight | Tom Sergeant |
| 1996 | Daniel Massey | Taking Sides | Wilhelm Furtwängler |
| 1996 | Donal McCann | The Steward of Christendom | Thomas Dunne |
1997
| 1997 | Antony Sher | Stanley | Stanley Spencer |
| 1997 | Paul Scofield | John Gabriel Borkman | John Gabriel Borkman |
| 1997 | Ken Stott | Art | Yvan |
| 1997 | David Suchet | Who's Afraid of Virginia Woolf? | George |
1998
| 1998 | Ian Holm | King Lear | King Lear |
| 1998 | Simon Russell Beale | Othello | Iago |
| 1998 | Michael Gambon | Tom & Clem | Tom Driberg |
| 1998 | Rupert Graves | Hurlyburly | Eddie |
| 1998 | John Wood | The Invention of Love | A. E. Housman |
1999
| 1999 | Kevin Spacey | The Iceman Cometh | Theodore "Hickey" Hickman |
| 1999 | Michael Gambon | The Unexpected Man | Parsky |
| 1999 | Iain Glen | The Blue Room | Various Characters |
| 1999 | Jim Norton | The Weir | Jack |
| 1999 | David Suchet | Amadeus | Salieri |

=== 2000s ===
| Year | Actor | Play | Character |
2000
| 2000 | Henry Goodman | The Merchant of Venice | Shylock |
| 2000 | Roger Allam | Summerfolk | Bassov |
| 2000 | Stephen Dillane | The Real Thing | Henry |
| 2000 | Michael Sheen | Look Back in Anger | Jimmy Porter |
| 2000 | Antony Sher | The Winter's Tale | Leontes |
2001
| 2001 | Conleth Hill | Stones in His Pockets | Charlie Conlon |
| 2001 | Simon Russell Beale | Hamlet | Prince Hamlet |
| 2001 | Sean Campion | Stones in His Pockets | Jake Quinn |
| 2001 | Michael Gambon | The Caretaker | Davies |
| 2001 | Bill Nighy | Blue/Orange | Professor Smith |
2002
| 2002 | Roger Allam | Privates on Parade | Terri Dennis |
| 2002 | Simon Russell Beale | Humble Boy | Felix Humble |
| 2002 | Sean Foley | The Play What I Wrote | Sean |
| 2002 | Hamish McColl | The Play What I Wrote | Hamish |
| 2002 | Alan Rickman | Private Lives | Elyot |
2003
| 2003 | Simon Russell Beale | Uncle Vanya | Uncle Vanya |
| 2003 | Michael Gambon | A Number | Salter |
| 2003 | Mark Rylance | Twelfth Night | Olivia |
| 2003 | David Tennant | Lobby Hero | Jeff |
2004
| 2004 | Matthew Kelly | Of Mice and Men | Lennie Small |
| 2004 | Roger Allam | Democracy | Willy Brandt |
| 2004 | Kenneth Branagh | Edmond | Edmond Burke |
| 2004 | Greg Hicks | Coriolanus | Coriolanus |
| 2004 | Michael Sheen | Caligula | Caligula |
2005
| 2005 | Richard Griffiths | The History Boys | Douglas Hector |
| 2005 | Michael Gambon | Endgame | Hamm |
| 2005 | Jonathan Pryce | The Goat, or Who Is Sylvia? | Martin |
| 2005 | Ben Whishaw | Hamlet | Prince Hamlet |
2006
| 2006 | Brian Dennehy | Death of a Salesman | Willy Loman |
| 2006 | Richard Griffiths | Heroes | Henri |
| 2006 | Derek Jacobi | Don Carlos | Philip II of Spain |
| 2006 | Con O'Neill | Telstar | Joe Meek |
| 2006 | David Threlfall | Someone Who'll Watch Over Me | Michael |
2007
| 2007 | Rufus Sewell | Rock 'n' Roll | Jan |
| 2007 | Iain Glen | The Crucible | John Proctor |
| 2007 | David Haig | Donkeys' Years | Christopher Headingley |
| 2007 | Frank Langella | Frost/Nixon | Richard Nixon |
| 2007 | Michael Sheen | Frost/Nixon | David Frost |
2008
| 2008 | Chiwetel Ejiofor | Othello | Othello |
| 2008 | Ian McKellen | King Lear | King Lear |
| 2008 | Mark Rylance | Boeing Boeing | Robert |
| 2008 | John Simm | Elling | Elling |
| 2008 | Patrick Stewart | Macbeth | Macbeth |
2009
| 2009 | Derek Jacobi | Twelfth Night | Malvolio |
| 2009 | David Bradley | No Man's Land | Spooner |
| 2009 | Michael Gambon | No Man's Land | Hirst |
| 2009 | Adam Godley | Rain Man | Raymond Babitt |

=== 2010s ===
| Year | Actor | Play | Character |
2010
| 2010 | Mark Rylance | Jerusalem | Johnny "Rooster" Byron |
| 2010 | James Earl Jones | Cat on a Hot Tin Roof | Big Daddy |
| 2010 | Jude Law | Hamlet | Prince Hamlet |
| 2010 | James McAvoy | Three Days of Rain | Walker / Ned |
| 2010 | Ken Stott | A View from the Bridge | Eddie Carbone |
| 2010 | Samuel West | ENRON | Jeffrey Skilling |
2011
| 2011 | Roger Allam | Henry IV, Parts 1 and 2 | Falstaff |
| 2011 | Derek Jacobi | King Lear | King Lear |
| 2011 | Rory Kinnear | Hamlet | Prince Hamlet |
| 2011 | Mark Rylance | La Bête | Valere |
| 2011 | David Suchet | All My Sons | Joe Keller |
2012
| 2012 | Benedict Cumberbatch & Jonny Lee Miller | Frankenstein | Victor Frankenstein / The Creature |
| 2012 | James Corden | One Man, Two Guvnors | Francis Henshall |
| 2012 | David Haig | The Madness of George III | George III |
| 2012 | Douglas Hodge | Inadmissible Evidence | William Maitland |
| 2012 | Jude Law | Anna Christie | Mat Burke |
2013
| 2013 | Luke Treadaway | The Curious Incident of the Dog in the Night-Time | Christopher Boone |
| 2013 | Rupert Everett | The Judas Kiss | Oscar Wilde |
| 2013 | James McAvoy | Macbeth | Macbeth |
| 2013 | Mark Rylance | Twelfth Night | Olivia |
| 2013 | Rafe Spall | Constellations | Roland |
2014
| 2014 | Rory Kinnear | Othello | Iago |
| 2014 | Henry Goodman | The Resistible Rise of Arturo Ui | Arturo Ui |
| 2014 | Tom Hiddleston | Coriolanus | Coriolanus |
| 2014 | Jude Law | Henry V | Henry V of England |
2015
| 2015 | Mark Strong | A View from the Bridge | Eddie Carbone |
| 2015 | Richard Armitage | The Crucible | John Proctor |
| 2015 | James McAvoy | The Ruling Class | Jack Gurney |
| 2015 | Tim Pigott-Smith | King Charles III | King Charles lll |
2016
| 2016 | Kenneth Cranham | The Father | Andre |
| 2016 | Kenneth Branagh | The Winter's Tale | Leontes |
| 2016 | Benedict Cumberbatch | Hamlet | Prince Hamlet |
| 2016 | Adrian Lester | Red Velvet | Ira Aldridge |
| 2016 | Mark Rylance | Farinelli and the King | King Philip V of Spain |
2017
| 2017 | Jamie Parker | Harry Potter and the Cursed Child | Harry Potter |
| 2017 | Ed Harris | Buried Child | Dodge |
| 2017 | Tom Hollander | Travesties | Henry Carr |
| 2017 | Ian McKellen | No Man's Land | Spooner |
2018
| 2018 | Bryan Cranston | Network | Howard Beale |
| 2018 | Paddy Considine | The Ferryman | Quinn Carney |
| 2018 | Andrew Garfield | Angels in America | Prior Walter |
| 2018 | Andrew Scott | Hamlet | Prince Hamlet |
2019
| 2019 | Kyle Soller | The Inheritance | Eric Glass |
| 2019 | Simon Russell Beale; Adam Godley; Ben Miles | The Lehman Trilogy | Henry Lehman; Emanuel Lehman; Mayer Lehman |
| 2019 | Arinzé Kene | Misty | Arinzé |
| 2019 | Ian McKellen | King Lear | King Lear |
| 2019 | David Suchet | The Price | Gregory Solomon |

=== 2020s ===
| Year | Actor | Play | Character |
2020
| 2020 | Andrew Scott | Present Laughter | Garry Essendine |
| 2020 | Toby Jones | Uncle Vanya | Uncle Vanya |
| 2020 | James McAvoy | Cyrano de Bergerac | Cyrano de Bergerac |
| 2020 | Wendell Pierce | Death of a Salesman | Willy Loman |
| 2021 | Not presented due to extended closing of theatre productions during COVID-19 pandemic (Note: Due to late March 2020 to late July 2021 closing of London theatre productions during the COVID-19 pandemic in England, the 2022 awards recognise productions that launched anytime from February 2020 to February 2022) | | |
2022
| 2022 | Hiran Abeysekera | Life of Pi | Pi Patel |
| 2022 | Ben Daniels | The Normal Heart | Ned Weeks |
| 2022 | Omari Douglas | Constellations | Manuel |
| 2022 | Charles Edwards | Best of Enemies | Gore Vidal |
2023
| 2023 | Paul Mescal | A Streetcar Named Desire | Stanley Kowalski |
| 2023 | Tom Hollander | Patriots | Berezovsky |
| 2023 | Rafe Spall | To Kill a Mockingbird | Atticus Finch |
| 2023 | David Tennant | Good | John Halder |
| 2023 | Giles Terera | Blues for an Alabama Sky | Guy Jacobs |
2024
| 2024 | Mark Gatiss | The Motive and the Cue | Sir John Gielgud |
| 2024 | Joseph Fiennes | Dear England | Gareth Southgate |
| 2024 | James Norton | A Little Life | Jude St Francis |
| 2024 | Andrew Scott | Vanya | All characters |
| 2024 | David Tennant | Macbeth | Macbeth |
2025
| 2025 | John Lithgow | Giant | Roald Dahl |
| 2025 | Adrien Brody | The Fear of 13 | Nick Yarris |
| 2025 | Billy Crudup | Harry Clarke | Harry Clarke |
| 2025 | Paapa Essiedu | Death of England: Delroy | Delroy |
| 2025 | Mark Strong | Oedipus | Oedipus |
2026
| 2026 | Jack Holden | Kenrex | Ken McElroy |
| 2026 | Bryan Cranston | All My Sons | Joe Keller |
| 2026 | Sean Hayes | Good Night, Oscar | Oscar Levant |
| 2026 | Tom Hiddleston | Much Ado About Nothing | Benedick |
| 2026 | David Shields | Punch | Jacob Dunne |

== Multiple awards and nominations for Best Actor ==
Note: The below awards and nominations include individuals awarded and nominated under the now-defunct categories Actor of the Year in a New Play and Actor of the Year in a Revival as well as the current combined Best Actor category.

=== Awards ===
Four awards

- Ian McKellen

Two awards

- Roger Allam
- Brian Cox
- Alan Howard
- Derek Jacobi
- Mark Rylance
- Antony Sher

=== Nominations ===
Eleven nominations

- Michael Gambon

Ten nominations

- Ian McKellen

Seven nominations

- Derek Jacobi
- Mark Rylance
- David Suchet

Five nominations

- Simon Russell Beale

Four nominations

- Roger Allam
- James McAvoy
- Antony Sher

Three nominations

- Kenneth Branagh
- Brian Cox
- Henry Goodman
- David Haig
- Alan Howard
- Jude Law
- Alec McCowen
- Warren Mitchell
- Bob Peck
- Jonathan Pryce
- Paul Scofield
- Andrew Scott
- Michael Sheen
- Patrick Stewart
- David Tennant

Two nominations

- Alun Armstrong
- Michael Bryant
- Tom Conti
- Kenneth Cranham
- Bryan Cranston
- Benedict Cumberbatch
- Rupert Everett
- Albert Finney
- Iain Glen
- Richard Griffiths
- Alec Guinness
- Nigel Hawthorne
- Tom Hiddleston
- Tom Hollander
- Emrys James
- Rory Kinnear
- Adrian Lester
- Daniel Massey
- Peter McEnery
- Michael Pennington
- Donald Sinden
- Mark Strong
- Rafe Spall
- Ken Stott
- John Wood

== Multiple awards and nominations for a character ==
=== Awards ===
Two awards

- Falstaff from Henry IV, Parts 1 and 2
- Richard III of England from Richard III
- Willy Loman from Death of a Salesman
- Eddie Carbone from A View from the Bridge

=== Nominations ===
Six nominations

- Prince Hamlet from Hamlet

Four nominations

- King Lear from King Lear
- Uncle Vanya from Uncle Vanya

Three nominations

- Coriolanus from Coriolanus
- Eddie Carbone from A View from the Bridge
- Falstaff from Henry IV, Parts 1 and 2
- Henry V of England from Henry V
- Iago from Othello
- Leontes from The Winter's Tale
- Shylock from The Merchant of Venice
- Spooner from No Man's Land
- Willy Loman from Death of a Salesman

Two nominations

- Benedick from Much Ado About Nothing
- Captain Shotover from Heartbreak House
- Davies from The Caretaker
- George III from The Madness of George III
- Joe Keller from All My Sons
- John Procter from The Crucible
- Macbeth from Macbeth
- Max from The Homecoming
- Ned Weeks from The Normal Heart
- Olivia from Twelfth Night
- Richard III of England from Richard III

== See also ==
- Best Actor
- Laurence Olivier Award for Actor of the Year in a New Play (1976–1984, 1988)
- Laurence Olivier Award for Actor of the Year in a Revival (1976–1984, 1988)
- Leading actor
- Lists of acting awards
- Critics' Circle Theatre Award for Best Actor
- Standard Theatre Award for Best Actor
- Tony Award for Best Actor in a Play
