= Laurence Olivier Award for Best New Play =

Annual award for London theatre

- Awarded for: Best New Play
- Location: England
- Presented by: Society of London Theatre
- First award: 1976
- Currently held by: Punch (2026)
- Website: officiallondontheatre.com/olivier-awards/

The Laurence Olivier Award for Best New Play is an annual award presented by the Society of London Theatre in recognition of the "world-class status of London theatre." The awards were established as the Society of West End Theatre Awards in 1976, and renamed in 1984 in honour of English actor and director Laurence Olivier.

The award was titled Play of the Year from its establishment in 1976, and was first retitled to its current name for the 2001 Olivier Awards.

== Winners and nominees ==
=== 1970s ===
Year	Play	Writer
1976
1976	Dear Daddy	Denis Cannan
1976	For King and Country	John Wilson
1976	Funny Peculiar	Mike Stott
1976	Old World	Aleksei Arbuzov and Ariadne Nicolaeff
1977
1977	The Fire that Consumes	Henry de Montherlant, Vivian Cox and Bernard Miles
1977	Cause Célèbre	Terence Rattigan
1977	Dusa, Fish, Stas and Vi	Pam Gems
1977	State of Revolution	Robert Bolt
1978
1978	Whose Life Is It Anyway?	Brian Clark
1978	Half-Life	Julian Mitchell
1978	Lark Rise	Flora Thompson and Keith Dewhurst
1978	Plenty	David Hare
1979
1979	Betrayal	Harold Pinter
1979	Night and Day	Tom Stoppard
1979	The Crucifer of Blood	Arthur Conan Doyle and Paul Giovanni
1979	Undiscovered Country	Arthur Schnitzler and Tom Stoppard

=== 1980s ===
Year	Play	Writer
1980
1980	The Life and Adventures of Nicholas Nickleby	Charles Dickens and David Edgar
1980	A Lesson from Aloes	Athol Fugard
1980	Duet for One	Tom Kempinski
1980	The Dresser	Ronald Harwood
1981
1981	Children of a Lesser God	Mark Medoff
1981	Passion Play	Peter Nichols
1981	Translations	Brian Friel
1981	Quartermaine's Terms	Simon Gray
1982
1982	Another Country	Julian Mitchell
1982	Insignificance	Terry Johnson
1982	84, Charing Cross Road	Helene Hanff and James Roose-Evans
1982	Our Friends in the North	Peter Flannery
1983
1983	Glengarry Glen Ross	David Mamet
1983	Pack of Lies	Hugh Whitemore
1983	The Slab Boys Trilogy	John Byrne
1983	Tales from Hollywood	Christopher Hampton
1984
1984	Benefactors	Michael Frayn
1984	"Master Harold"...and the Boys	Athol Fugard
1984	Poppie Nongena	Elsa Joubert, Sandra Kotze and Hilary Blecher
1984	Rat in the Skull	Ron Hutchinson
1985
1985	Red Noses	Peter Barnes
1985	Doomsday	Tony Harrison
1985	The Road to Mecca	Athol Fugard
1985	Torch Song Trilogy	Harvey Fierstein
1986
1986	Les Liaisons Dangereuses	Christopher Hampton
1986	The American Clock	Arthur Miller
1986	The Normal Heart	Larry Kramer
1986	Ourselves Alone	Anne Devlin
1987
1987	Serious Money	Caryl Churchill
1987	Lettice and Lovage	Peter Shaffer
1987	A Lie of the Mind	Sam Shepard
1987	Sarcophagus	Vladimir Gubaryev
1988
1988	Our Country's Good	Timberlake Wertenbaker
1988	A Walk in the Woods	Lee Blessing
1988	Mrs. Klein	Nicholas Wright
1988	The Secret Rapture	David Hare
1989/90
1989/90	Racing Demon	David Hare
1989/90	Ghetto	Joshua Sobol
1989/90	Man of the Moment	Alan Ayckbourn
1989/90	Shadowlands	William Nicholson

=== 1990s ===
Year	Play	Writer
1991
1991	Dancing at Lughnasa	Brian Friel
1991	Singer	Peter Flannery
1991	The Trackers of Oxyrhynchus	Tony Harrison
1991	White Chameleon	Christopher Hampton
1992
1992	Death and the Maiden	Ariel Dorfman
1992	Angels in America	Tony Kushner
1992	The Madness of George III	Alan Bennett
1992	Three Birds Alighting on a Field	Timberlake Wertenbaker
1993
1993	Six Degrees of Separation	John Guare
1993	Someone Who'll Watch Over Me	Frank McGuinness
1993	The Gift of the Gorgon	Peter Shaffer
1993	The Street of Crocodiles	Bruno Schulz and Théâtre de Complicité
1994
1994	Arcadia	Tom Stoppard
1994	Oleanna	David Mamet
1994	Angels in America: Perestroika	Tony Kushner
1994	The Last Yankee	Arthur Miller
1995
1995	Broken Glass	Arthur Miller
1995	Dealer's Choice	Patrick Marber
1995	900 Oneonta	David Beaird
1995	Three Tall Women	Edward Albee
1996
1996	Skylight	David Hare
1996	Pentecost	David Edgar
1996	The Steward of Christendom	Sebastian Barry
1996	Taking Sides	Ronald Harwood
1997
1997	Stanley	Pam Gems
1997	The Beauty Queen of Leenane	Martin McDonagh
1997	Blinded by the Sun	Stephen Poliakoff
1997	The Herbal Bed	Peter Whelan
1998
1998	Closer	Patrick Marber
1998	Amy's View	David Hare
1998	Hurlyburly	David Rabe
1998	The Invention of Love	Tom Stoppard
1998	Tom & Clem	Stephen Churchett
1999
1999	The Weir	Conor McPherson
1999	The Blue Room	David Hare
1999	Copenhagen	Michael Frayn
1999	The Unexpected Man	Yasmina Reza

=== 2000s ===
Year	Play	Writer
2000
2000	Goodnight Children Everywhere	Richard Nelson
2000	Perfect Days	Liz Lochhead
2000	Rose	Martin Sherman
2000	The Lady in the Van	Alan Bennett
2000	Three Days of Rain	Richard Greenberg
2001
2001	Blue/Orange	Joe Penhall
2001	Dolly West's Kitchen	Frank McGuinness
2001	Life x 3	Yasmina Reza
2001	My Zinc Bed	David Hare
2002
2002	Jitney	August Wilson
2002	Boy Gets Girl	Rebecca Gilman
2002	Gagarin Way	Gregory Burke
2002	Humble Boy	Charlotte Jones
2002	Mouth to Mouth	Kevin Elyot
2003
2003	Vincent in Brixton	Nicholas Wright
2003	Jesus Hopped the 'A' Train	Stephen Adly Guirgis
2003	The Coast of Utopia	Tom Stoppard
2003	The York Realist	Peter Gill
2004
2004	The Pillowman	Martin McDonagh
2004	Democracy	Michael Frayn
2004	Elmina's Kitchen	Kwame Kwei-Armah
2004	Hitchcock Blonde	Terry Johnson
2005
2005	The History Boys	Alan Bennett
2005	By the Bog of Cats	Marina Carr
2005	Festen	David Eldridge
2005	The Goat, or Who Is Sylvia?	Edward Albee
2006
2006	On the Shore of the Wide World	Simon Stephens
2006	Coram Boy	Helen Edmundson
2006	Harvest	Richard Bean
2006	Paul	Howard Brenton
2007
2007	Blackbird	David Harrower
2007	Frost/Nixon	Peter Morgan
2007	Rock 'n' Roll	Tom Stoppard
2007	The Seafarer	Conor McPherson
2008
2008	A Disappearing Number	Simon McBurney
2008	The Reporter	Nicholas Wright
2008	Vernon God Little	Tanya Ronder
2008	War Horse	Nick Stafford
2009
2009	Black Watch	Gregory Burke
2009	August: Osage County	Tracy Letts
2009	The Pitmen Painters	Lee Hall
2009	That Face	Polly Stenham

=== 2010s ===
Year	Play	Writer
2010
2010	The Mountaintop	Katori Hall
2010	ENRON	Lucy Prebble
2010	Jerusalem	Jez Butterworth
2010	Red	John Logan
2011
2011	Clybourne Park	Bruce Norris
2011	End of the Rainbow	Peter Quilter
2011	The Little Dog Laughed	Douglas Carter Beane
2011	Sucker Punch	Roy Williams
2011	Tribes	Nina Raine
2012
2012	Collaborators	John Hodge
2012	Jumpy	April De Angelis
2012	One Man, Two Guvnors	Richard Bean
2012	The Ladykillers	Graham Linehan
2013
2013	The Curious Incident of the Dog in the Night-Time	Simon Stephens
2013	Constellations	Nick Payne
2013	The Audience	Peter Morgan
2013	This House	James Graham
2014
2014	Chimerica	Lucy Kirkwood
2014	1984	Robert Icke and Duncan MacMillan
2014	The Night Alive	Conor McPherson
2014	Peter and Alice	John Logan
2015
2015	King Charles III	Mike Bartlett
2015	Taken at Midnight	Mark Hayhurst
2015	The Nether	Jennifer Haley
2015	Wolf Hall / Bring Up the Bodies	Hilary Mantel and Mike Poulton
2016
2016	Hangmen	Martin McDonagh
2016	Farinelli and the King	Claire van Kampen
2016	People, Places and Things	Duncan MacMillan
2016	The Father	Florian Zeller
2017
2017	Harry Potter and the Cursed Child	Jack Thorne
2017	Elegy	Nick Payne
2017	The Flick	Annie Baker
2017	One Night in Miami…	Kemp Powers
2018
2018	The Ferryman	Jez Butterworth
2018	Ink	James Graham
2018	Network	Lee Hall
2018	Oslo	J. T. Rogers
2019
2019	The Inheritance	Matthew Lopez
2019	The Lehman Trilogy	Stefano Massini
2019	Misty	Arinzé Kene
2019	Sweat	Lynn Nottage

=== 2020s ===
Year	Play	Writer
2020
2020	Leopoldstadt	Tom Stoppard
2020	A Very Expensive Poison	Lucy Prebble
2020	The Doctor	Robert Icke
2020	The Ocean at the End of the Lane	Joel Horwood
2021	Not presented due to extended closing of theatre productions during COVID-19 pandemic (Note: Due to late March 2020 to late July 2021 closing of London theatre productions during the COVID-19 pandemic in England, the 2022 awards recognise productions that launched anytime from February 2020 to February 2022.)	
2022
2022	Life of Pi	Lolita Chakrabarti
2022	2:22 A Ghost Story	Danny Robins
2022	Best of Enemies	James Graham
2022	Cruise	Jack Holden
2023
2023	Prima Facie	Suzie Miller
2023	For Black Boys Who Have Considered Suicide When the Hue Gets Too Heavy	Ryan Calais Cameron
2023	Patriots	Peter Morgan
2023	To Kill a Mockingbird	Aaron Sorkin
2024
2024	Dear England	James Graham
2024	The Hills of California	Jez Butterworth
2024	The Motive and the Cue	Jack Thorne
2024	Till the Stars Come Down	Beth Steel
2025
2025	Giant	Mark Rosenblatt
2025	The Fear of 13	Lindsey Ferrentino
2025	Kyoto	Joe Murphy and Joe Robertson
2025	Shifters	Benedict Lombe
2025	The Years	Eline Arbo and Stephanie Bain
2026
2026	Punch	James Graham
2026	1536	Ava Pickett
2026	Inter Alia	Suzie Miller
2026	Kenrex	Jack Holden and Ed Stambollouian

== Multiple awards and nominations for Best New Play ==
=== Awards ===
Two awards

- James Graham
- David Hare
- Martin McDonagh
- Simon Stephens
- Tom Stoppard

=== Nominations ===
Seven nominations

- David Hare
- Tom Stoppard

Five nominations

- James Graham

Three nominations

- Jez Butterworth
- Athol Fugard
- Christopher Hampton
- Conor McPherson
- Martin McDonagh
- Peter Morgan

Two nominations

- David Edgar
- Michael Frayn
- Brian Friel
- Pam Gems
- Ronald Harwood
- Jack Holden
- Terry Johnson
- Suzie Miller
- Julian Mitchell
- Frank McGuinness
- Simon Stephens
- Jack Thorne

== See also ==
- Critics' Circle Theatre Award for Best New Play
- Evening Standard Theatre Award for Best Play
- Tony Award for Best Play
