= Ngozi Anyanwu =

Nigeria-born playwright and actress

- Born: Ngozi Jane Anyanwu; Nigeria
- Education: Point Park University (BA); University of California, San Diego (MFA)
- Occupations: Playwright and actress

Ngozi Jane Anyanwu is a playwright and actress.

== Life and education ==
Anyanwu was born in Trenton, New Jersey. She earned her BA from Point Park University, Pittsburgh, Pennsylvania, and her MFA from the graduate acting program at University of California, San Diego.

She is an alumnus of an Old Vic New Voices program, and has had residencies at Djerassi Artists Residency, Lincoln Center Theater (LCT), and SPACE on Ryder Farm.

She resides in New York.

== Work ==
Themes in Anyanwu's work include family, identities, and the concept of home. Anyanwu's play Good Grief won Center Theatre Group's Humanitas Award after its world premiere at the Kirk Douglas Theatre in 2016. It was included on The Kilroys' List in 2016.

Her play, THE HOMECOMING QUEEN, premiered at the Atlantic Theater Company January 22, 2018. It tells the story of a "prodigal daughter" born in Nigeria who returns after living in the USA. The play ran at the Atlantic Theater Company through February 18, 2018. Her play The Last of the Love Letters, which focuses on two people examining the end of a relationship, premiered at the Atlantic Theater Company on August 26, 2021.

Her most recent new play, The Monsters, premiered at Manhattan Theatre Club Off-Broadway in 2026 starring Aigner Mizzelle and Okieriete Onaodowan. The play follows two siblings involved in martial arts. The show was positively received, with the New York Theatre Guide calling it "an epic and throbbing heart of a play" and The New York Times praising it as a "searing two-hander" and naming it a Critic's Pick.

Anyanwu is a recipient of New York Stage and Film's Founders Award. She is commissioned by Old Globe Theatre and the Atlantic Theater Company.

== Filmography ==
=== Television ===
Anyanwu is credited as an actress in the following television series:

- The Affair
- Deadbeat
- The Deuce
- Law & Order: Special Victims Unit
- Limitless
- The Mysteries of Laura

== Stage credits ==
Year	Title	Role	Venue	Ref.
2008	War	Performer	Off-Broadway, Rattlestick Theatre	
2016	Good Grief	Playwright, Nkechi	Los Angeles, Center Theatre Group	
2018	Good Grief	Playwright, Nkechi	Off-Broadway, Vineyard Theatre	
2018	THE HOMECOMING QUEEN	Playwright	Off-Broadway, Atlantic Theatre Company	
2018	Nike or we don’t need another hero	Playwright	Reading, The New Black Fest	
2021	The last of the love letters or the last of the mad sad geniuses	Playwright	Off-Broadway, Atlantic Theatre Company	
2022	MY NAME…IS BEATRICE	Playwright	Off-Broadway, Atlantic Theatre Company First Gen MIXFEST	
2023	the book of Lucy	Playwright	Regional, Trinity Repertory Company	
2026	The Monsters	Playwright	Off-Broadway, Manhattan Theatre Club and Two River Theatre	

== Awards and nominations ==
Year	Award	Category	Work	Result	Ref.
2026	Lucille Lortel Award	Outstanding Play	The Monsters	Nominated	
2026	Drama League Award	Outstanding Production of a Play	The Monsters	Nominated	
2026	Outer Critics Circle Award	Outstanding New Off-Broadway Play	The Monsters	Nominated	
2026	Outer Critics Circle Award	Outstanding Direction of a Play	The Monsters	Nominated	
