= Inter Alia (play) =

2025 play by Suzie Miller

- National Theatre promotional poster
- Written by: Suzie Miller
- Genre: Legal drama

Premiere
- Date: 10 July 2025
- Place: Lyttelton Theatre, National Theatre London
- Directed by: Justin Martin

Inter Alia is a legal drama play written by Australian playwright Suzie Miller. It had its world premiere at the National Theatre in London in 2025, starring Rosamund Pike as Crown Court Judge Jessica Parks. The production is directed by Justin Martin. The production was filmed by NT Live and shown in cinemas from 25 September 2025.

== Synopsis ==
The play centres on Jessica Parks, an eminent and pioneering London Crown Court Judge. She is a compassionate and sharp legal mind, often challenging the system from within, particularly in cases of sexual violence. However, her life is a constant juggling act between her high-powered career and her roles as a wife and mother. She handles the majority of the domestic and emotional labour, from planning dinner parties to having crucial conversations with her teenage son, Harry, while her husband, Michael, a less professionally successful barrister, often remains a passive figure in her domestic world.

The central conflict of the play arises when an event from her personal life collides with her professional principles. Her son, Harry, is accused of rape by a classmate after a party. Jessica, a proud feminist who has presided over countless sexual assault cases, suddenly finds her professional and moral convictions put to the ultimate test. The play delves into the ethical and emotional turmoil she faces as she must reconcile her unwavering commitment to justice with her instinct to protect her son. Miller's work explores the ambiguities of consent, the challenges of raising boys in the digital age, and the difficult moral territory a parent must navigate when their child is accused of a crime. The production uses elements like live music, shifting sets, and flashbacks to blur the lines between the courtroom and Jessica's home life, showcasing the psychological and emotional pressure she endures.

== Production history ==
=== London (2025) ===
The production received its world premiere at the Lyttelton Theatre at the National Theatre in London on 23 July 2025, following previews which began on 10 July 2025. Casting includes Rosamund Pike, Jamie Glover, and Jasper Talbot. Pike had not performed on stage for 14 years, and the run sold out before she had started rehearsals. The production closed on 13 September 2025.

The production received positive reviews. Emma John, writing in The Guardian, gave it 4 out of 5 stars, praising the writing, although saying "Determined to give every issue and angle a fair hearing, Inter Alia sheds its nimbleness and wit as it grapples with the serious stuff in its later stages". She praises "Pike's physical, occasionally anarchic performance". Marianka Swain, writing for London Theatre, headlined her review "Rosamund Pike gives a rock-star performance in this scorching legal drama", giving it 4 out of 5 stars. Lucinda Everett wrote on WhatsOnStage.com "Miller gives us provocation without polemics", and praised the performances, set, lighting, and sound, also awarding 4 stars.

A trailer of the National Theatre Live film version was shown in UK cinemas from 4 September 2025, with the film premiering in UK and Australian cinemas on 25 September 2025, and later on their own National Theatre at Home streaming service from 7 July 2026.

=== West End (2026) ===
The production transferred to the West End in Spring 2026 for a strictly limited engagement. Performances began on 19 March 2026 at the Wyndham's Theatre and set to end 20 June 2026. Rosamund Pike reprised her role, along with Jamie Glover. Cormac McAlinden joined the company.

=== Broadway (2026) ===
The production is scheduled to transfer to Broadway from 10 November 2026 until 21 February 2027 at the Music Box Theatre. Rosamund Pike is set to reprise her performance with further casting and dates yet to be announced.

== Cast and characters ==
Character	London	West End
Character	2025	2026
Jessica Parks	Rosamund Pike	Rosamund Pike
Michael Wheatley	Jamie Glover	Jamie Glover
Harry Wheatley	Jasper Talbot	Cormac McAlinden

== Adaptations and sequels ==
The play is set to be adapted as a novel, to be published in 2026.

Miller has indicated that Inter Alia may be the second in a loose trilogy, following her 2019 legal drama, Prima Facie.

== Awards and nominations ==
Year	Award	Category	Nominee	Result	Ref.
2026	Laurence Olivier Awards	Best New Play	Suzie Miller	Nominated	
2026	Laurence Olivier Awards	Best Actress	Rosamund Pike	Won	
