= Crucible Theatre =

Theatre and event venue in Sheffield, England

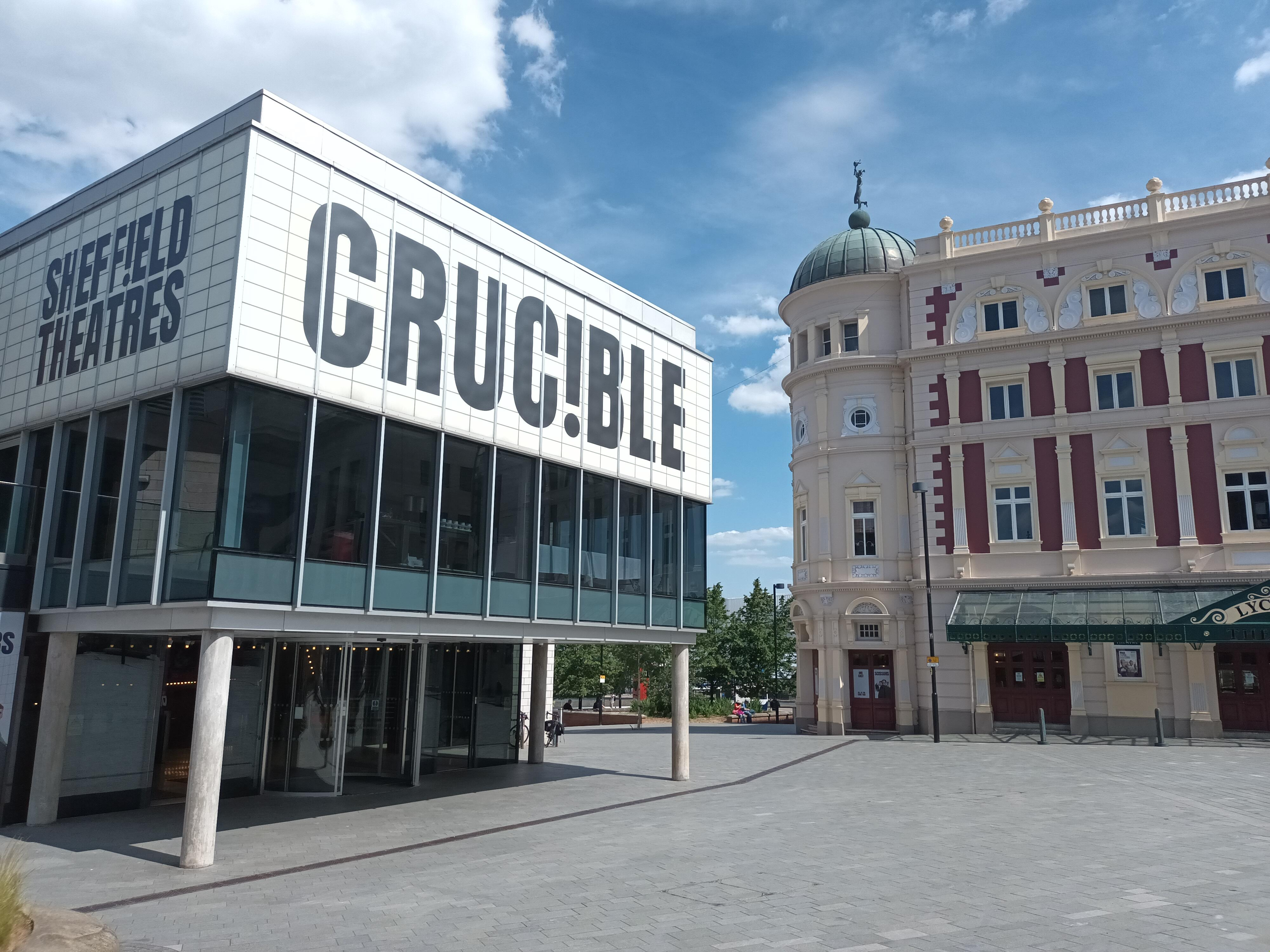
- Main entrance
- Interactive map of Crucible Theatre
- Address: 55 Norfolk Street; Sheffield, S1 1DA; England
- Coordinates: 53°22′52″N 01°28′00″W
- Owner: Sheffield Theatres
- Capacity: 980
- Type: Thrust Stage
- Public transit: B P Y TT; Castle Square; Arundel Gate Interchange

Construction
- Opened: 1971
- Architect: RHWL

Website
- sheffieldtheatres.co.uk

Listed Building – Grade II
- Official name: The Crucible Theatre
- Designated: 1 November 2007
- Reference no.: 1392311

The Crucible Theatre, or simply The Crucible, is a theatre in Sheffield, South Yorkshire, England, which opened in 1971. Its name refers to crucible steel, which was developed in Sheffield in 1740 and drove the industrialisation of the city.

As well as staging regular theatrical performances, the theatre also serves as a sports venue, having hosted the World Snooker Championship annually since 1977. The Guardian newspaper has called the Crucible the "spiritual home of snooker". The World Women's Snooker Championship and the World Seniors Championship have also been staged at the venue.

In May 2022, proposed plans were unveiled to build a new 3,000-seat venue nearby with a bridge connecting the two buildings.

== History ==
The Crucible Theatre was built by M J Gleeson and opened in 1971. It replaced the Sheffield Repertory Theatre, which was based in Townhead Street at the Sheffield Playhouse. In 1967, the Crucible's founding artistic director Colin George recommended a thrust stage for Sheffield, inspired by theatres created by Sir Tyrone Guthrie. Tanya Moiseiwitsch, who had been involved in designing Guthrie's theatres, was recruited to design Gleeson's theatre as well.

The Crucible Theatre is built on the site formerly occupied by the Adelphi Hotel, which closed in May 1969 and was demolished soon after. The architects Renton Howard Wood Levin Architects were employed, and the Crucible building itself began to take shape in 1969. It was completed in two years and officially opened in November 1971. The opening night performances were Fanfare, an evening's entertainment showing children acting in an improvised scene; Anton Chekhov's Swansong, with Ian McKellen and Edward Petherbridge; and a music hall finale featuring a Sheffield brass band.

The opening-night programme demonstrated the versatility of the stage, which has since been adapted for dance and musical performances, as well as classical and modern theatre. The Crucible Theatre also hosts touring productions and the World Snooker Championship. The audience sits on three sides of the stage, but no spectator is more than 22 yards (20 metres) from the performance. Consequently, although the theatre seats 980 people, the audience has an intimate relationship with the activity on stage. Colin George and the administrator David Brayshaw persuaded the Gulbenkian Foundation to finance the building of a professional studio theatre – the 400 seat Tanya Moiseiwitsch Playhouse, which opened with the main house.

In 2001, the Crucible was awarded the Barclays 'Theatre of the Year Award'.

Before and after refurbishment

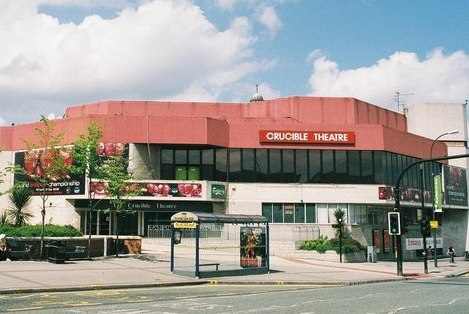
April 2005

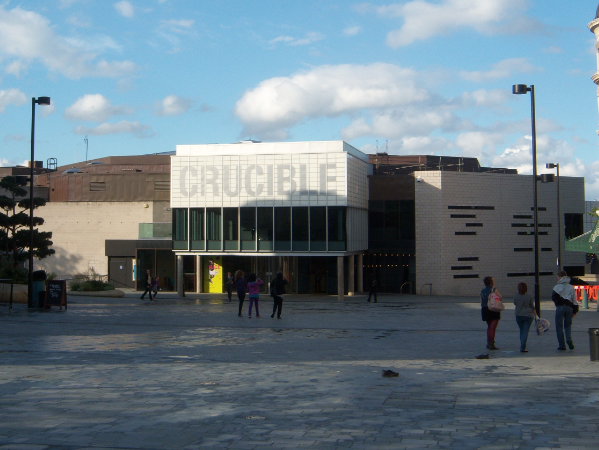
July 2010

The Crucible is a Grade II listed building. Between 2007 and late 2009, it went through a £15 million refurbishment, opening during that period only for the 2008 and 2009 World Snooker Championships. The Crucible reopened as a theatre on 11 February 2010 with a production of Henrik Ibsen's An Enemy of the People, and on 18 February it was officially reopened by Prince Edward.

== Operation ==
=== Theatre ===
The Crucible is a producing theatre where shows are designed and rehearsed in-house. Productions are normally overseen by the Sheffield Theatres Group which also comprises the smaller Playhouse, housed within the same complex, and the neighbouring receiving venue, the Lyceum.

=== Sports venue ===
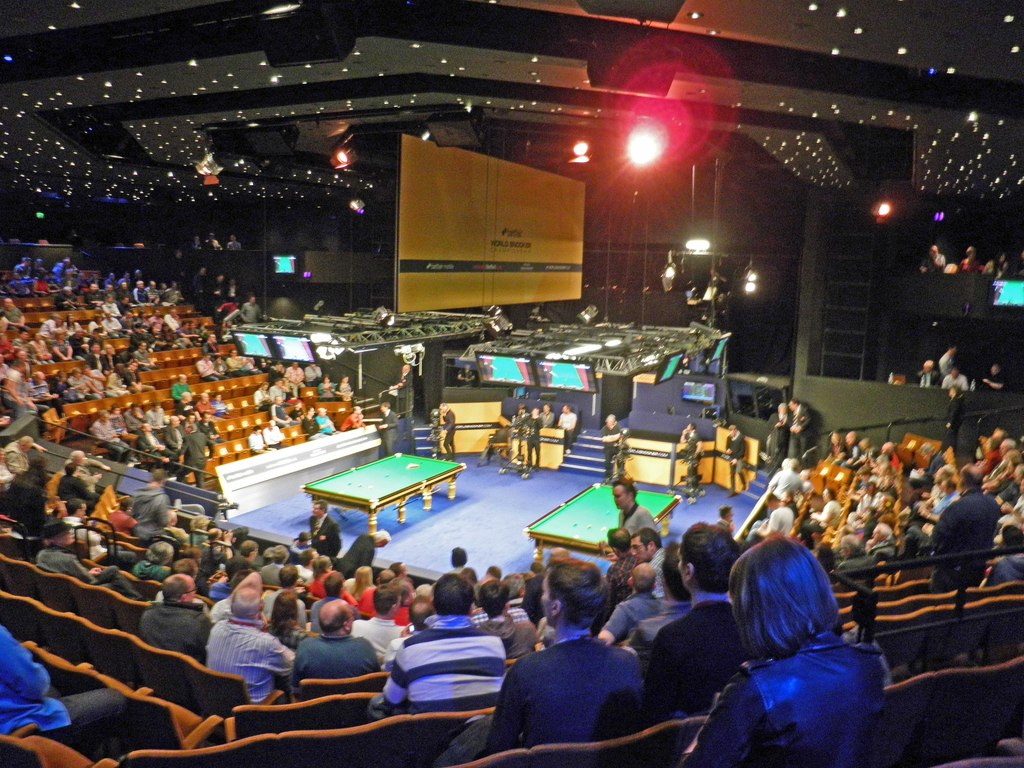
The 2013 World Snooker Championship

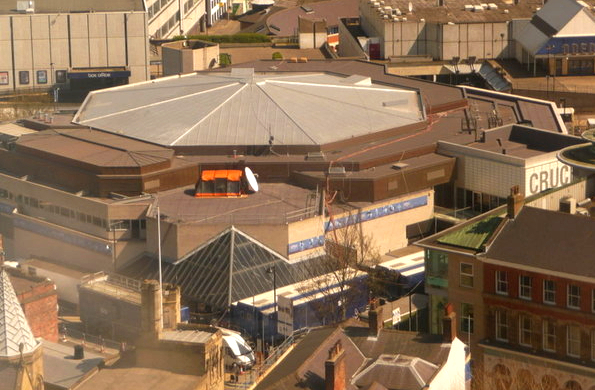
Aerial view of the Crucible Theatre

The World Snooker Championship tournament has been played annually at the Crucible since 1977, and the venue has been lauded for creating a special feeling of excitement around the event. Sports journalist Peter Mason, in The Guardian, has argued that while the physical aspects of the Crucible are "greatly underwhelming", there is an undeniably special atmosphere inside the auditorium which means that "against all the modernist odds this relentlessly forward-looking theatre appears to have become infused with memories of the past every bit as easily as if it were a creaking old music hall dating back to the 19th century".

The World Women's Snooker Championship was held at the Crucible between 1998 and 2003, but it was eventually withdrawn due to financial difficulties. The Crucible is the current venue for the World Seniors Championship. The venue has also hosted championships of other indoor sports, such as squash and table tennis.

== Proposed future plans ==
In May 2022 proposed concepts were unveiled for a new World Snooker Championship venue that would be attached to the existing Crucible Theatre building via a bridge. The new venue could host up to 3,000 spectators. Snooker promoter Barry Hearn had confirmed talks were underway with Sheffield City Council in April 2022. Hearn added that the tournament could move elsewhere if the new project is not supported but, "the Crucible name is synonymous with snooker globally ... so the name has to remain." Concepts for the new building were created by James Burland, the architect behind the City of Manchester Stadium, along with Arup. Proposals also indicate that the building could house a snooker museum.

On 24 March 2026, it was announced that the Crucible would be renovated following the 2028 World Snooker Championship to have up to 500 additional seats, increasing its potential capacity to 1,480. The renovation is planned to be complete in time for the 2030 staging of the event.

== See also ==
- Listed buildings in Sheffield
