= Kenrex =

2024 play

- Original London Production Poster
- Written by: Jack Holden & Ed Stambollouian
- Based on: The story of Ken McElroy
- Music by: John Patrick Elliott
- Lyrics by: John Patrick Elliott
- Genre: True crime

Premiere
- Date: 26 October 2024
- Place: Tanya Moiseiwitsch Playhouse, Sheffield
- Directed by: Ed Stambollouian

Kenrex is a true-crime thriller play that dramatizes the real-life events surrounding the 1981 killing of Ken Rex McElroy in Skidmore, Missouri. It's co-written by Jack Holden and Ed Stambollouian. It also features an original score by John Patrick Elliott. It had its world premiere at the Tanya Moiseiwitsch Playhouse in Sheffield in October 2024.

== Synopsis ==
The play is set in the rural town of Skidmore, Missouri, during the late 1970s and early 1980s, a period of economic decline for the local farming community. The narrative centers on the reign of terror led by Ken Rex McElroy, a local man who had spent decades intimidating the town through a cycle of cattle rustling, arson, and assault. Despite being indicted for dozens of felonies over twenty years, McElroy consistently avoided conviction by threatening witnesses and exploiting legal loopholes, earning him a reputation as an "untouchable" outlaw.

== Production history ==
=== Sheffield (2024) ===
The play received its world premiere as part of Sheffield Theatre's 2024–25 season. It began performances on 26 October at the Tanya Moiseiwitsch Playhouse and ran through 16 November.

=== London (2025) ===
The production transferred to the Southwark Playhouse Borough on 14 February 2025 and ran through 16 March. Holden reprised his performance from Sheffield.

The production subsequently returned to London at The Other Palace in late 2025. Performances began on 3 December 2025 and ran through 1 February 2026. The production was subsequently nominated for 6 Laurence Olivier Awards, including Best Play. It won two of them: Jack Holden won Best Actor and Giles Thomas took Best Sound Design.

=== Off-Broadway (2026) ===
The production made its North American premiere Off-Broadway in New York City on April 16 at the Lucille Lortel Theatre, with Holden reprising his performance. The production received positive reviews, and was nominated for three Drama Desk Awards, with Holden winning Outstanding Solo Performance and composer John Patrick Elliott winning Outstanding Music in a Play.

== Awards and nominations ==
=== 2025 London production ===
Year	Award	Category	Nominee	Result	Ref.
2026	Laurence Olivier Awards	Best New Play	Jack Holden and Ed Stambollouian	Nominated	
2026	Laurence Olivier Awards	Best Actor	Jack Holden	Won	
2026	Laurence Olivier Awards	Best Director	Ed Stambollouian	Nominated	
2026	Laurence Olivier Awards	Best Lighting Design	Joshua Pharo	Nominated	
2026	Laurence Olivier Awards	Best Sound Design	Giles Thomas	Won	
2026	Laurence Olivier Awards	Outstanding Musical Contribution	John Patrick Elliott (composition)	Nominated	

=== 2026 Off-Broadway production ===
Year	Award	Category	Nominee	Result	Ref.
2026	Drama Desk Award	Outstanding Solo Performance	Jack Holden	Won	
2026	Drama Desk Award	Outstanding Music in a Play	John Patrick Elliott	Won	
2026	Drama Desk Award	Outstanding Sound Design of a Play	Giles Thomas	Nominated	
2026	Outer Critics Circle Award	Outstanding Solo Performance	Jack Holden	Nominated	
