= Best of Enemies (play) =

Political drama by James Graham, 2021

- Written by: James Graham
- Characters: William F. Buckley Jr. Gore Vidal
- Subject: Politics
- Genre: Drama

Premiere
- Date: December 2021
- Place: Young Vic, London

Best of Enemies is a political drama play by James Graham. It premiered at the Young Vic, London in December 2021, and the playscript was published by Methuen in collaboration with the theatre and Headlong.

== Plot ==
The play features a fictionalised retelling of the 1968 ABC TV debates between William F. Buckley Jr. and Gore Vidal, which take place during the Republican and Democratic Party conventions. Graham was inspired by a documentary film on the subject by Morgan Neville and Robert Gordon.

The play also contains other celebrities from the time such as David Brinkley, Andy Warhol, James Baldwin, and Aretha Franklin. They are used to set context and reflect the theme of how TV debates emerged in this period and have developed.

== Reception ==
The play received universal critical acclaim. The Times praised the play as a 'raw, exciting and timely piece about how we have forgotten how to listen to each other'. James Graham was described by Time Out as a playwright 'on top of his game', while The Guardian's Mark Lawson argued that 'he stands with "Aaron Sorkin" as our best dramatic interpreters of the interplay of media and politics'.

The premiere cast was led by David Harewood as Buckley and Charles Edwards as Vidal, which provoked debate around Harewood's colour-blind casting. Lawson supported the choice in The Guardian, commenting that 'as a means of equalising opportunity for actors, there is no reasonable argument against racially fluid casting'. Clive Davis went further in The Times, adding 'It’s a clever touch to have Buckley — no friend of the civil rights movement — played by a black actor. Harewood’s presence undermines the liberal preconceptions of the audience'.

In 2022, the production received two Olivier Award nominations, for Best New Play and Best Actor for Edwards, and won the Critics’ Circle Theatre Award for Best New Play.

The play transferred to the Noël Coward Theatre in the West End in November 2022, with Zachary Quinto taking over the role of Gore Vidal.

== Awards and nominations ==
Year	Award	Category	Nominee	Result
2022	Laurence Olivier Award	Best New Play		Nominated
2022	Laurence Olivier Award	Best Actor	Charles Edwards	Nominated
2022	Critics’ Circle Theatre Award	Best New Play	James Graham	Won
