= Old Vic New Voices =

UK-based arts organisation

Old Vic New Voices Logo 2014

Old Vic New Voices (OVNV) is The Old Vic’s Education, Community and Emerging Talent programme.

== About ==
Old Vic New Voices aims to nurture talent, inspire young people and open up the theatre to everyone. They develop the next generation of theatre practitioners, many of whom go on to get major commissions, directing posts, senior management positions and become household names; they offer access and insights into theatre making for all ages and experiences. The programme was founded in 2001 by Kate Packenham, then an associate producer to Sally Greene, The Old Vic’s Chief Executive. Steve Winter took over as Director in 2004 and ran the programme until March 2014. He was replaced by Alexander Ferris.

== Talent ==
OVNV offers emerging theatre makers space and funding for creative projects, ongoing professional development and invaluable networking opportunities with peer and industry mentors.

=== The Old Vic 12 ===
Introduced by Matthew Warchus' during his first season as artistic director, The Old Vic 12 offers twelve emerging artists from a variety of disciplines opportunities to expand networks, receive first class mentorship and benefit from the prestigious association with The Old Vic through a year-long attachment. In 2015, the first twelve were announced as Zoe Lafferty, Caitlin McLeod, Edward Stambollouian, Sarah Georgeson, Paul Jellis, Martha Rose Wilson, Sarah Beaton, Lanre Malaolu, Harry Blake, Samuel Bailey, Sonali Bhattacharyya and Steven Hevey. The twelve creatives are set to work alongside each other to develop their skills and present a work in progress to an industry audience.

=== The Old Vic Workrooms ===
The OVNV Workrooms is a rehearsal facility open six days a week, and designed to be a place to meet, devise, chat and collaborate free of charge. In its first two months, The OVNV Lab helped develop around 40 projects using The Workrooms facility.

=== Talent Alumni ===
Alumni from OVNV Talent projects include:

- Ed Harris_(playwright)
- Charity Wakefield
- Gethin Anthony
- Nick Payne
- Ella Hickson
- Sarah Solemani
- Mike Bartlett
- Bryony Hannah
- Joel Horwood
- Jessica Raine
- Joanna Christie
- Alex Oates
- Lucy Kirkwood
- Vanessa Kirby
- David Oakes
- Eddie Eyre
- Nikole Beckwith
- Paten Hughes
- Margo Seibert
- Duncan Macmillan
- Ngozi Anyanwu

== Education ==
OVNV has worked with over 60,000 students from schools across London through their Education programme. The education projects give schools access to free theatre tickets to every Old Vic production, alongside bespoke learning experiences at the theatre, in the classroom and online, thanks to funding all of these projects are delivered for free.

=== Schools’ Club ===
The flagship education project Schools’ Club works with 40 specially selected schools from across London for a full academic year. Each of the chosen schools selects up to 30 students from years 9-13 to participate; this can be a pre-existing or new group. These 1,200 students are given the opportunity to take part in four exclusive pre-show workshops during the year before attending every production in The Old Vic season. The workshops are delivered by carefully trained professional theatre facilitators and prepare the students for each play by exploring the characters, plot and themes, as well as developing confidence and interpersonal skills. Schools also receive a Teachers’ Pack; teacher training sessions throughout the year and backstage tours.

=== Stage Business ===
Stage Business is The Old Vic’s unique employability project for schools and youth organisations across the UK. The interactive project is designed to enhance young people’s workplace skills through theatre, and includes creative workshops, theatre visits, inspirational talks and peer-led learning to identify and develop leaders of the future. Stage Business works with over 2000 students each year to develop confidence, communication skills and creative imagination. In addition to working intensively with 10 Stage Business Ambassadors from each school and organisation, workshops are supported by a comprehensive online programme of learning. Participants also develop skills to allow them to apply their knowledge to deliver workshops to younger students aged 11–14. In addition, the project connects schools and youth organisations each year through an online portal and INSET sessions.

=== Front Line ===
Front Line offers 16-20 year olds, from Lambeth or Southwark, an opportunity to learn about careers in theatre through paid placements with The Old Vic’s front of house team. Participants get the opportunity to watch one of the productions, shadow various members of Front of House staff and take on roles such welcoming patrons to The Old Vic Theatre.

== Community ==
OVNV’s Community programme invites members of the London community to debate issues faced living in the capital, working to create and perform ambitious productions. OVNV offers drop-in sessions, theatre bootcamps and free access to The Old Vic, helping to open up theatre to everyone.

=== The Old Vic Community Company ===
In 2013, it was announced that building on their multi award-winning community work, OVNV will create London’s largest inclusive Community Company, reaching out to individuals who want to make a difference in their community. The Company will explore shared social issues and help participants develop the skills and platforms to express themselves as theatre makers. Over three years, 200 people will take part in workshops, projects, pop-up performances and theatre productions. There will also be opportunities for aspiring writers to be part of the project through a Writers on Attachment programme.

=== Rise (2016) ===
Rise will be the third, and last production from The Old Vic Community Company. In August 2016, 200 Londoners will take over an outdoor space to present a kaleidoscope of ideas, discussions and stories that explore our relationship with the environment. With music, movement and bicycles, Rise will explore the impact of living in a city where the temperature is rising.

=== Ages (2015) ===
Ages was the second production from The Old Vic Community Company. The specially commissioned play with cutting-edge scientific views and a platform for opinion will start a debate about what it means to grow up and grow old in the city.

Inspired by testimonies of real Londoners, Ages will feature music, movement and drama.

Ages played to hundreds of people at The Old Vic Workrooms in May 2015.

=== Housed (2014) ===
From estate agents to squatters, from support workers to oligarchs, we are all united in a race to get a place. But who can afford to go the distance? Luckily Sam’s got a chance to make a change, to make things better somehow. Sam’s going to tell us the answer. He just doesn't know what it is yet.

David Watson’s epic tale, based on the testimonies of over 200 Londoners, was a response to the mounting housing crisis and asked what it means to find some space in a city that’s squeezing you out.

Housed played to packed houses at The Old Vic and Hotel Elephant in July 2014.

== Previous Productions ==
=== Epidemic (2012) ===
In 2012 Old Vic New Voices produced the community musical Epidemic at The Old Vic Tunnels (29). The production focused on the public health issues of obesity and mental health and was backed by the Wellcome Trust. Written by Morgan Lloyd Malcolm, the production was the culmination of 18 months of research including one-on-one interviews, group workshops, creative writing sessions, and community events. It focused on the character of Marlon, who needs help from a system he doesn't trust and runs away to find answers; the musical featured 10 new songs.

Epidemic won an Arts and Health Award from the Royal Society for Public Health in recognition of “innovative theatre work highlighting the major public health challenges of mental illness and obesity”.

=== Platform (2010) ===
Platform was a promenade piece staged for a week at The Old Vic Tunnels that looked at what it meant to be a Londoner in 2010. The show featured a largely non-professional cast and crew of 120 people, ranging in age from 17 to 75 from diverse backgrounds and professions, including students, city workers, former drug addicts and a 74-year-old former hospital social worker.

The script for Platform was created from 200 hours of interviews by writers Duncan Macmillan and Morgan Lloyd Malcolm, themselves part of OVNV's emerging talent programme.

The British Theatre Guide said: “Platform is truly inventive and its affection and passion for London and her people unmistakably shine through".

The Evening Standard described the project as “a striking testament to [The Old Vic’s] imperviousness to arts cuts.

Kevin Spacey said of the project: "I'm delighted we're doing our third community show and have managed to pull off something as remarkable and crazily ambitious as a 120-strong acting company. The show pulls all these stories of different Londoners together. And what's really pleasing is that it's so positive and upbeat about the city".

=== Branded (2008) ===
OVNV’s second community production, Branded, was written by Simon Bent, and staged at The Old Vic from 1–3 May 2008, for five performances, all free of charge. The piece, commissioned as part of OVNV’s Go for Green outreach and community project, featured a cast and crew of 50, aged from 16 to 60, selected through a series of London-wide open auditions. The play used a diverse selection of skills including; free-running, poetry, dance and physical theatre, to tell the story of the launch of an environmentally-friendly range of training shoes.

Funders of the programme included Adventure Ecology, HSBC and the Hunter Foundation.

=== Somme Theatre (2006) ===
OVNV’s first community production, Somme Theatre, was a collaboration with the Imperial War Museum which saw a cast of locals perform a play, On the Middle Day, about the Battle of the Somme. The play was staged to mark the 90th anniversary of the battle in which the British Army lost 58,000 troops, and included a cameo appearance by the Old Vic’s artistic director Kevin Spacey as the voice of King George V.

Somme Theatre was funded by a £46,100 grant from the Heritage Lottery Fund. The project was named the UK’s favourite Lottery-funded heritage project at The National Lottery Awards in 2007; the awards were chosen by the public.
