= Tanya Moiseiwitsch Playhouse =

Studio theatre in Sheffield, England

- Interactive map of Tanya Moiseiwitsch Playhouse
- Former names: Studio Theatre
- Address: 55 Norfolk Street; Sheffield; England
- Coordinates: 53.380°N 1.467°W
- Owner: Sheffield Theatres
- Capacity: 400
- Type: Studio

Construction
- Opened: 1971
- Rebuilt: 1994
- Architect: Tanya Moiseiwitsch

Website
- www.sheffieldtheatres.co.uk

The Tanya Moiseiwitsch Playhouse (formerly the Studio Theatre) is a studio theatre that forms part of the Sheffield Theatres complex in Sheffield, England. The theatre, which was opened in 1971, is situated in the same building as the Crucible Theatre and holds a maximum capacity of 400 people. The present artistic director is Elizabeth Newman.

In 2022, it was renamed in honour of Tanya Moiseiwitsch.

== See also ==
- Sheffield Theatres Productions
