= Ed Stambollouian =

English playwright and director

- Born: Edward Jack Stambollouian; 23 October 1987 (age 38)
- Other name: Edward Stambollouian
- Education: University of Manchester; Bristol Old Vic Theatre School
- Years active: 2012–present
- Website: www.edstambo.com

Edward Jack Stambollouian (born 23 October 1987) is an English theatre and comedy director, playwright, producer and blogger. He was nominated for the Laurence Olivier Award for Best Director among other accolades.

== Early life ==
Stambollouian is from North London. His father John is of Armenian descent; the Stambollouians arrived in Manchester from Kayseri and Smyrna in the 1890s. Stambollouian graduated with a degree in Drama and English from the University of Manchester and a Master of Arts (MA) in Theatre Directing from Bristol Old Vic Theatre School.

== Career ==
Starting with Some Lycett Hot at the 2012 Edinburgh Fringe Festival, Stambollouian began working with Joe Lycett on a number of comedy shows. In 2013, Stambollouian served as Associate Director to Jamie Lloyd during Lloyd's tenure as Artistic Director of Trafalgar Studios. Stambollouian directed Rob Hayes' at the 2014 Edinburgh Fringe Festival, starring Jack Holden.

Stambollouian was selected for the 2015 inaugural Old Vic 12 emerging writers scheme. That same year, he directed Feathers in the Snow at Unicorn Theatre and the international stage tour The Amazing Tour Is Not on Fire for YouTubers Dan and Phil.

This was followed by the comedy event Invisible Dot's Birthday Bash. Stambollouian went on to direct Blush at the 2016 Edinburgh Fringe Festival and Night School for the 2018 Pinter event at the Harold Pinter Theatre, marking Stambollouian's West End debut.

During the COVID-19 pandemic, Stambollouian dabbled in food blogging with a focus on Armenian cuisine. He returned to directing in 2021 with Ian Wooldridge's adaptation of Animal Farm in a collaboration between the Royal & Derngate Theatre and the National Youth Theatre.

In 2022, Stamboullian directed Max Fosh's comedy show Zocial Butterfly, Daniel Howell's tour We're All Doomed! and the Sorted Food live Christmas special.

With Holden, Stambollouian co-wrote and directed the true crime play Kenrex. The play premiered in Sheffield in 2024 before transferring to London the following year and New York in 2026. Kenrex went on to receive six Laurence Olivier Award nominations, including Best Director for Stambollouian and Best New Play. The play was nominated for a 2026 Offie and Critics' Circle Theatre Award.
