= Leontes =

Character in The Winter's Tale

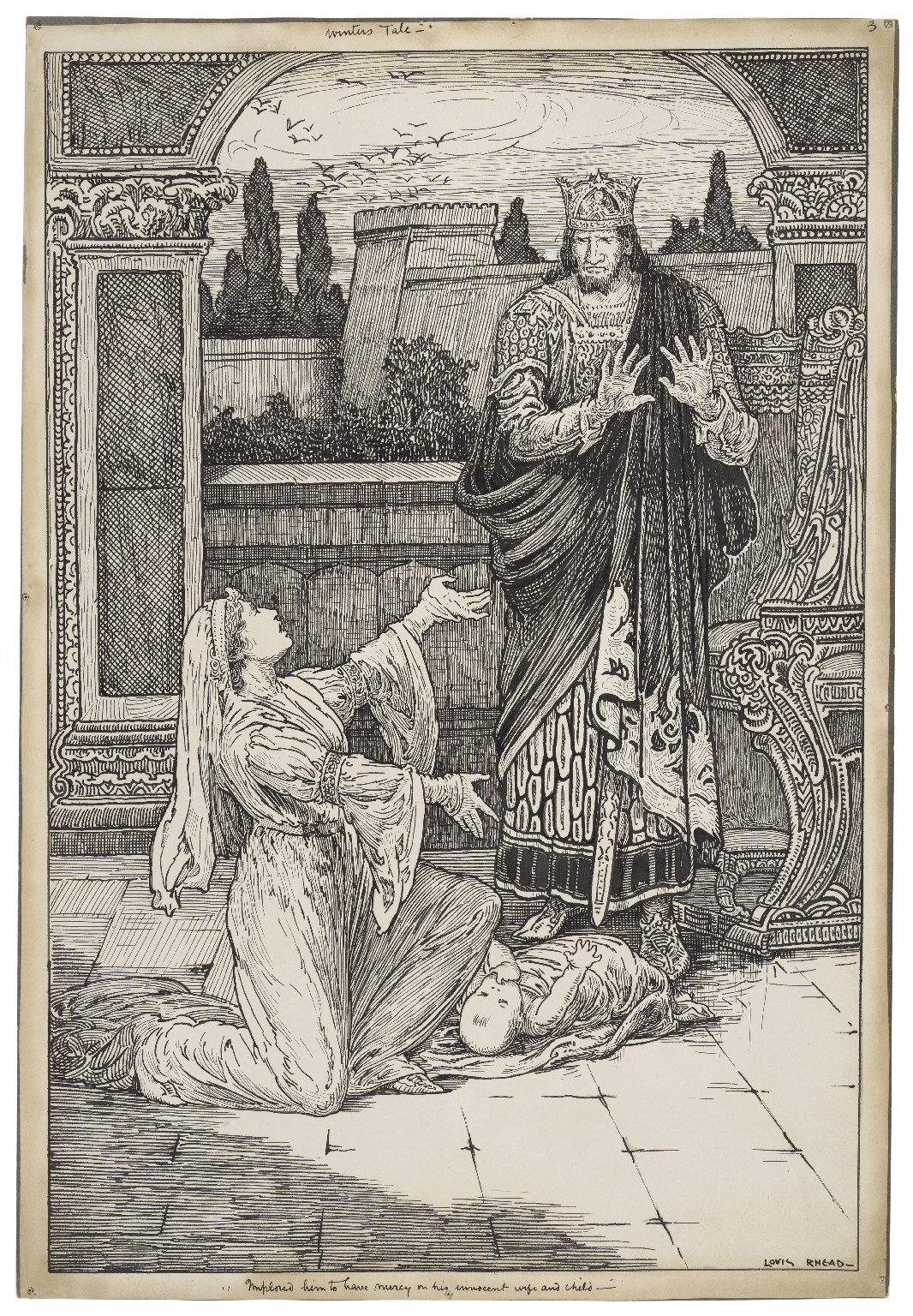
An ink drawing of Act II, Scene iii of The Winter's Tale: Paulina implores Leontes to have mercy on his daughter, Perdita. Illustration was designed for an edition of Lamb's Tales, copyrighted 1918.

King Leontes is a fictional character in Shakespeare's play The Winter's Tale. He is the father of Mamillius and husband to Queen Hermione. He becomes obsessed with the belief that his wife has been having an affair with Polixenes, his childhood friend and King of Bohemia. Because of this, he tries to have his friend poisoned, has his wife imprisoned, and orders his infant daughter to be cast out. The daughter, Perdita, survives nonetheless when she is discovered in her basket on the coast of Bohemia by shepherds who adopt and raise her. His young son dies of grief at his mother's plight, and Hermione faints on hearing the news and is reported dead. Leontes comes to understand his faults, and is filled with remorse for his ill-treatment of his Queen. At the end of the play, he is reunited with daughter and his wife, who returns from death in the play's mysterious finale.

Literary critic Harold Bloom has called Leontes Shakespeare's finest representation of jealousy of the male heart. Shakespeare's portrayal is debatable, as he is viewed as a jealous tyrant, in many ways a true villain, though there is also a commonly held view that Shakespeare purposefully wanted to present a childish, flippant man.

Actors who have given notable performances as Leontes include Johnston Forbes-Robertson, Henry Ainley, John Gielgud, Jeremy Irons, Patrick Stewart and Antony Sher.
