= 2005 Laurence Olivier Awards =

Edition of London theatre awards

- Date: 20 February 2005

The 2005 Laurence Olivier Awards were held in 2005 in London celebrating excellence in West End theatre by the Society of London Theatre.

== Winners and nominees ==
Details of winners (in bold) and nominees, in each award category, per the Society of London Theatre.

| Best New Play | Best New Musical |
|---|---|
| **The History Boys by Alan Bennett – National Theatre Lyttelton**; By the Bog of Cats by Marina Carr – Wyndham's; Festen by David Eldridge – Almeida / Lyric; The Goat: Who Is Sylvia by Edward Albee – Almeida / Apollo | **The Producers – Theatre Royal, Drury Lane**; Mary Poppins – Prince Edward; The Woman in White – Palace |
| Best Revival | Outstanding Musical Production |
| **Hamlet – Old Vic**; All's Well That Ends Well – Gielgud; Endgame – Albery; Journey's End – Comedy / Playhouse / Duke of York's | **Grand Hotel – Donmar Warehouse**; A Funny Thing Happened on the Way to the Forum – National Theatre Olivier; Simply Heavenly – Trafalgar Studios; Sweeney Todd – Trafalgar Studios / New Ambassadors |
| Best Actor | Best Actress |
| **Richard Griffiths as Douglas Hector in The History Boys – National Theatre Lyttelton**; Michael Gambon as Hamm in Endgame – Albery; Jonathan Pryce as Martin Gray in The Goat: Who Is Sylvia – Almeida / Apollo; Ben Whishaw as Prince Hamlet in Hamlet – Old Vic | **Clare Higgins as Hecuba in Hecuba – Donmar Warehouse**; Victoria Hamilton as Catharine in Suddenly, Last Summer – Albery; Anna Maxwell Martin as Lyra Belacqua in His Dark Materials – National Theatre Olivier; Caroline O'Connor as Performer in Bombshells – Arts |
| Best Actor in a Musical | Best Actress in a Musical |
| **Nathan Lane as Max Bialystock in The Producers – Theatre Royal, Drury Lane**; Lee Evans as Leo Bloom in The Producers – Theatre Royal, Drury Lane; Paul Hegarty as Sweeney Todd in Sweeney Todd – Trafalgar Studios / New Ambassadors; Gavin Lee as Bert in Mary Poppins – Prince Edward | **Laura Michelle Kelly as Mary Poppins in Mary Poppins – Prince Edward**; Maria Friedman as Marian Halcombe in The Woman in White – Palace; Leigh Zimmerman as Ulla Swanson in The Producers – Theatre Royal, Drury Lane |
| Best Performance in a Supporting Role | Best Performance in a Supporting Role in a Musical |
| **Amanda Harris as Emilia in Othello – Trafalgar Studios**; Samuel Barnett as David Posner in The History Boys – National Theatre Lyttelton; Judi Dench as The Countess of Rossillion in All's Well That Ends Well – Gielgud; Eddie Redmayne as Billy Gray in The Goat: Who Is Sylvia – Almeida / Apollo | **Conleth Hill as Roger de Bris in The Producers – Theatre Royal, Drury Lane**; Michael Crawford as Count Fosco in The Woman in White – Palace; David Haig as George Banks in Mary Poppins – Prince Edward |
| Best Director | Best Theatre Choreographer |
| **Nicholas Hytner for The History Boys – National Theatre Lyttelton**; Richard Eyre and Matthew Bourne for Mary Poppins – Prince Edward; Rufus Norris for Festen – Almeida / Lyric; Susan Stroman for The Producers – Theatre Royal, Drury Lane | **Matthew Bourne and Stephen Mear for Mary Poppins – Prince Edward**; Adam Cooper for Grand Hotel – Donmar Warehouse; Susan Stroman for The Producers – Theatre Royal, Drury Lane |
| Best Set Design | Best Costume Design |
| **Giles Cadle for His Dark Materials – National Theatre Olivier**; Bob Crowley for Mary Poppins – Prince Edward; William Dudley for The Woman in White – Palace; Ian MacNeil for Festen – Almeida / Lyric; Christopher Oram for Suddenly, Last Summer – Albery | **Deirdre Clancy for All's Well That Ends Well – Gielgud**; Bob Crowley for Mary Poppins – Prince Edward; John Gunter and Mark Bouman for Hamlet – Old Vic; William Ivey Long for The Producers – Theatre Royal, Drury Lane |
| Best Lighting Design | Best Sound Design |
| **Paule Constable for His Dark Materials – National Theatre Olivier**; Howard Harrison for Mary Poppins – Prince Edward; Jean Kalman for Festen – Almeida / Lyric; Paul Pyant for All's Well That Ends Well – Gielgud | **Mick Potter for The Woman in White – Palace**; Paul Arditti for Festen – Almeida / Lyric; Adam Cork for Suddenly, Last Summer – Albery |
| Outstanding Achievement in Dance | Best New Dance Production |
| **San Francisco Ballet for the season – Sadler's Wells**; Julien Macdonald for costuming for Shimmer, Richard Alston Dance Company – Sadler's Wells; Sylvia, The Royal Ballet – Royal Opera House; The ensemble for the season, Rambert Dance Company – Sadler's Wells | **Swamp, Rambert Dance Company – Sadler's Wells**; A Midsummer Night's Dream, Northern Ballet Theatre – Sadler's Wells; Milagros, Royal New Zealand Ballet – Sadler's Wells; Romeo and Juliet, Royal New Zealand Ballet – Sadler's Wells |
| Outstanding Achievement in Opera | Outstanding New Opera Production |
| **Thomas Adès for composing The Tempest – Royal Opera House**; Ben Heppner in Peter Grimes, The Royal Opera – Royal Opera House; John MacFarlane for set designing Lady Macbeth of the Mtsensk District and Peter Grimes, The Royal Opera – Royal Opera House; The orchestra for the season, The Royal Opera – Royal Opera House | **Lady Macbeth of the Mtsensk District, The Royal Opera – Royal Opera House**; Les Paladins, Les Arts Florissants – Barbican; Peter Grimes, The Royal Opera – Royal Opera House |
Outstanding Achievement or Performance in an Affiliate Theatre
**Andrew Scott in A Girl in a Car with a Man – Royal Court**; Guantanamo – Tricycle; Kevin Harvey in Yellowman – Hampstead; Aidan McArdle in The Shadow of a Gunman – Tricycle
Society Special Award
**Alan Bennett**

== Productions with multiple nominations and awards ==
The following 15 productions, including three operas, received multiple nominations:

- 9: Mary Poppins
- 8: The Producers
- 5: Festen and The Woman in White
- 4: All's Well That Ends Well and The History Boys
- 3: Hamlet, His Dark Materials, Peter Grimes, Suddenly, Last Summer and The Goat: Who Is Sylvia
- 2: Endgame, Grand Hotel, Lady Macbeth of the Mtsensk District and Sweeney Todd

The following four productions received multiple awards:

- 3: The History Boys
- 2: His Dark Materials, Mary Poppins and The Producers

== See also ==
- 59th Tony Awards
