= Laurence Olivier Award for Best Performance in a Supporting Role =

Retired award for London theatre

- Awarded for: Best Performance in a Supporting Role
- Location: England
- Presented by: Society of London Theatre
- First award: 1985
- Final award: 2012
- Website: officiallondontheatre.com/olivier-awards/

The Laurence Olivier Award for Best Performance in a Supporting Role was an annual award presented by the Society of London Theatre in recognition of the "world-class status of London theatre." The awards were established as the Society of West End Theatre Awards in 1976, and renamed in 1984 in honour of English actor and director Laurence Olivier.

This commingled actor/actress award was introduced in 1985, merging the preceding awards for Best Actor in a Supporting Role and Best Actress in a Supporting Role. However, this comingled award was suspended after its presentation in 1990; from 1991 to 2012, the supporting category vacillated at random between the commingled award (presented for 12 different seasons) and the original split pair of awards (presented for the other 11 seasons). The comingled Best Performance in a Supporting Role was last presented in 2012, and fully retired thereafter.

On the 16 occasions that this commingled award was given, it was presented six times to an actress and ten times to an actor.

== Winners and nominees ==
=== 1980s ===
Year	Actor	Play	Character
1985
1985	Imelda Staunton	A Chorus of Disapproval and The Corn is Green	Hannah Llewellyn / Bessie Watty
1985	Maria Aitken	Waste	Frances Trebell
1985	Patricia Routledge	Richard III	Queen Margaret
1985	Zoë Wanamaker	Mother Courage and Her Children	Mother Courage
1986
1986	Paul Jesson	The Normal Heart	Felix
1986	Janet Dale	The Merry Wives of Windsor and Othello	Mistress Page / Emilia
1986	Nicky Henson	As You Like It and The Merry Wives of Windsor	Touchstone / Ford
1986	Fiona Shaw	As You Like It and Mephisto	Celia / Erika Bruckner
1987
1987	Michael Bryant	King Lear and Antony and Cleopatra	The Fool / Enobarbus
1987	Robin Bailey	Fathers and Sons	Vassily Ivanyich Bazarov
1987	Diane Bull	Tons of Money	Louise Allington
1987	Sheila Reid	When I was a Girl I Used to Scream and Shout	Morag
1988
1988	Eileen Atkins	Cymbeline, The Winter's Tale and Mountain Language	Queen / Paulina / Elderly Woman
1988	Rudi Davies	A Touch of the Poet	Sara Melody
1988	Serena Evans	Henceforward...	Zoe
1988	Tony Haygarth	The Tempest	Trinculo
1989/90
1989/90	Michael Bryant	Hamlet, The Voysey Inheritance and Racing Demon	Polonius / Peacey / Rev. Harry Henderson
1989/90	Linda Kerr Scott	Ghetto	Djigan
1989/90	Simon Russell Beale	The Man of Mode, Restoration, Playing with Trains and Some Americans Abroad	Sir Fopling Flutter / Lord Are / Danny / Henry McNeil
1989/90	Zoë Wanamaker	Othello	Emilia

=== 1990s ===
Year	Actor	Play	Character
1996
1996	Simon Russell Beale	Volpone	Mosca
1996	Ben Chaplin	The Glass Menagerie	Tom Wingfield
1996	Geraldine McEwan	The Way of the World	Lady Wishfort
1996	Claire Skinner	The Glass Menagerie	Laura Wingfield
1998
1998	Sarah Woodward	Tom & Clem	Kitty
1998	Michael Bryant	King Lear	Lear's Fool
1998	Ronald Pickup	Amy's View	Frank Oddie
1998	Paul Rhys	King Lear	Edgar
1999
1999	Brendan Coyle	The Weir	Brendan
1999	Emma Fielding	The School for Scandal	Lady Teazle
1999	Adam Godley	Cleo, Camping, Emmanuelle and Dick	Kenneth
1999	Michael Sheen	Amadeus	Wolfgang Amadeus Mozart

=== 2000s ===
Year	Actor	Play	Character
2003
2003	Essie Davis	A Streetcar Named Desire	Stella Kowalski
2003	Jessica Hynes	The Night Heron	Bolla
2003	Mark Strong	Twelfth Night	Orsino
2003	Sian Thomas	Up for Grabs	Dawn
2004
2004	Warren Mitchell	The Price	Gregory Solomon
2004	Joe Dixon	The Roman Actor	Paris
2004	Oliver Ford Davies	Absolutely! (Perhaps)	Laudisi
2004	Paul Hilton	Mourning Becomes Electra	Orin
2005
2005	Amanda Harris	Othello	Emilia
2005	Samuel Barnett	The History Boys	Posner
2005	Judi Dench	All's Well that Ends Well	Countess Rossillion
2005	Eddie Redmayne	The Goat, or Who Is Sylvia?	Billy
2006
2006	Noma Dumezweni	A Raisin in the Sun	Ruth Younger
2006	David Bradley	Henry IV, Parts 1 and 2	Henry IV of England
2006	Benedict Cumberbatch	Hedda Gabler	George Tesman
2006	Anne Reid	Epitaph for George Dillon	Kate Elliot
2006	Paul Ritter	Coram Boy	Otis Gardiner
2007
2007	Jim Norton	The Seafarer	Richard Harkin
2007	Samantha Bond	Donkeys' Years	Rosemary
2007	Deborah Findlay	The Cut	Susan
2007	Mark Hadfield	Thérèse Raquin	Grivet
2007	Colm Meaney	A Moon for the Misbegotten	Phil
2008
2008	Rory Kinnear	The Man of Mode	Fopling Fluter
2008	Michelle Fairley	Othello	Emilia
2008	Pam Ferris	The Entertainer	Phoebe Rice
2008	Conleth Hill	Philistines	Teterev
2009
2009	Patrick Stewart	Hamlet	Claudius / Ghost
2009	Oliver Ford Davies	Hamlet	Polonius
2009	Kevin McNally	Ivanov	Lebedev
2009	Paul Ritter	The Norman Conquests	Reg

=== 2010s ===
Year	Actor	Play	Character
2012
2012	Sheridan Smith	Flare Path	Doris, Countess Skriczevinsky
2012	Mark Addy	Collaborators	Vladimir
2012	Oliver Chris	One Man, Two Guvnors	Stanley Stubbers
2012	Johnny Flynn	Jerusalem	Lee
2012	Bryony Hannah	The Children's Hour	Mary Tilford

== See also ==
- Drama Desk Award for Outstanding Featured Actor in a Play
- Drama Desk Award for Outstanding Featured Actress in a Play
- Lists of acting awards
- List of awards for supporting actor
- Tony Award for Best Featured Actor in a Play
- Tony Award for Best Featured Actress in a Play
