= 2008 Laurence Olivier Awards =

Edition of London theatre awards

- Date: 9 March 2008

The 2008 Laurence Olivier Awards were held in 2008 in London celebrating excellence in West End theatre by the Society of London Theatre.

== Winners and nominees ==
Details of winners (in bold) and nominees, in each award category, per the Society of London Theatre.

Best New Play	Best New Musical
**A Disappearing Number by Simon McBurney – Barbican**; The Reporter by Nicholas Wright – National Theatre Cottesloe; Vernon God Little by DBC Pierre, adapted by Tanya Ronder – Young Vic; War Horse by Michael Morpurgo, adapted by Nick Stafford – National Theatre Olivier	**Hairspray – Shaftesbury**; Parade – Donmar Warehouse; The Drowsy Chaperone – Novello; The Lord of the Rings – Theatre Royal, Drury Lane
Best Revival	Best Musical Revival
**Saint Joan – National Theatre Olivier**; Boeing-Boeing – Comedy; Dealer's Choice – Trafalgar Studios; Macbeth – Gielgud; The Seagull – Royal Court	**The Magic Flute – Young Vic**; Fiddler on the Roof – Savoy; Little Shop of Horrors – Duke of York’s / Ambassadors
Best New Comedy
**Rafta, Rafta by Ayub Khan-Din – National Theatre Lyttelton**; Absurdia: The Crimson Hotel by Michael Frayn – Donmar Warehouse; Elling by Simon Bent – Trafalgar Studios; Whipping It Up by Stephen Thompson – New Ambassadors
Best Actor	Best Actress
**Chiwetel Ejiofor as Othello in Othello – Donmar Warehouse**; Ian McKellen as Lear in King Lear – New London; Mark Rylance as Robert in Boeing-Boeing – Comedy; John Simm as Elling in Elling – Trafalgar Studios; Patrick Stewart as Macbeth in Macbeth – Gielgud	**Kristin Scott Thomas as Arkadina in The Seagull – Royal Court**; Anne-Marie Duff as Joan of Arc in Saint Joan – National Theatre Olivier; Kelly Reilly as Desdemona in Othello – Donmar Warehouse; Fiona Shaw as Winnie in Happy Days – National Theatre Lyttelton; Penelope Wilton as Ella Rentheim in John Gabriel Borkman – Donmar Warehouse
Best Actor in a Musical	Best Actress in a Musical
**Michael Ball as Edna Turnblad in Hairspray – Shaftesbury**; Bertie Carvel as Leo Frank in Parade – Donmar Warehouse; Henry Goodman as Tevye in Fiddler on the Roof – Savoy; Bob Martin as Man in Chair in The Drowsy Chaperone – Novello	**Leanne Jones as Tracy Turnblad in Hairspray – Shaftesbury**; Lara Pulver as Lucille Frank in Parade – Donmar Warehouse; Sheridan Smith as Audrey in Little Shop of Horrors – Duke of York’s / Ambassadors; Summer Strallen as Janet Van Der Graaf in The Drowsy Chaperone – Novello
Best Performance in a Supporting Role	Best Performance in a Supporting Role in a Musical
**Rory Kinnear as Fopling Fluter in The Man of Mode – National Theatre Oliver**; Michelle Fairley as Emilia in Othello – Donmar Warehouse; Pam Ferris as Phoebe Rice in The Entertainer – Old Vic; Conleth Hill as Teterev in Philistines – National Theatre Lyttelton	**Tracie Bennett as Velma Von Tussle in Hairspray – Shaftesbury**; Elinor Collett as Penny Pingleton in Hairspray – Shaftesbury; Shaun Escoffery as Jim Conley in Parade – Donmar Warehouse; Alistair McGowan as Orin Scrivello in Little Shop of Horrors – Duke of York’s / Ambassadors
Best Newcomer in a Play
**Tom Hiddleston as Cloten and Posthumus Leonatus in Cymbeline – Barbican**; David Dawson as Smike in The Life and Adventures of Nicholas Nickleby – Gielgud; Tom Hiddleston as Michael Cassio in Othello – Donmar Warehouse; Stephen Wight as Mugsy in Dealer's Choice – Trafalgar Studios
Best Director	Best Theatre Choreographer
**Rupert Goold for Macbeth – Gielgud**; Rob Ashford for Parade – Donmar Warehouse; Marianne Elliott and Tom Morris for War Horse – National Theatre Olivier; Jack O'Brien for Hairspray – Shaftesbury	**Toby Sedgwick for War Horse – National Theatre Olivier**; Rob Ashford for Parade – Donmar Warehouse; Jerry Mitchell for Hairspray – Shaftesbury; Casey Nicholaw for The Drowsy Chaperone – Novello
Best Set Design	Best Costume Design
**Rae Smith and Handspring Puppet Company for War Horse – National Theatre Olivier**; Lorna Heavey and Anthony Ward for Macbeth – Gielgud; Rob Howell for The Lord of the Rings – Theatre Royal, Drury Lane; David Rockwell for Hairspray – Shaftesbury	**Vicki Mortimer for The Man of Mode – National Theatre Olivier**; Gregg Barnes for The Drowsy Chaperone – Novello; Rob Howell for The Lord of the Rings – Theatre Royal, Drury Lane; William Ivey Long for Hairspray – Shaftesbury
Best Lighting Design	Best Sound Design
**Howard Harrison for Macbeth – Gielgud**; Paule Constable for War Horse – National Theatre Olivier; Kenneth Posner for Hairspray – Shaftesbury; Paul Pyant for The Lord of the Rings – Theatre Royal, Drury Lane	**Paul Arditti for Saint Joan – National Theatre Olivier**; Simon Baker for The Lord of the Rings – Theatre Royal, Drury Lane; Terry Jardine and Nick Lidster for Parade – Donmar Warehouse; Steve C. Kennedy for Hairspray – Shaftesbury; Christopher Shutt for War Horse – National Theatre Olivier
Outstanding Achievement in Dance	Best New Dance Production
**The ensemble for Jewels, The Royal Ballet – Royal Opera House**; Savion Glover in Live for London – Sadler’s Wells; Jonathan Goddard, Richard Alston Dance Company – Sadler’s Wells; Wendy Whelan in Fool's Paradise, Christopher Wheeldon Company – Royal Opera House	**Jewels, The Royal Ballet – Royal Opera House**; Mozart Dances, Mark Morris Dance Group – Barbican; The Bull, Fabulous Beast Dance Theatre – Barbican; The Three Muskateers, Northern Ballet Theatre – Sadler’s Wells
Outstanding Achievement in Opera	Outstanding New Opera Production
**Natalie Dessay in La fille du régiment, The Royal Opera – Royal Opera House**; Gerald Finley in Pelléas and Mélisande, The Royal Opera – Royal Opera House; Angelika Kirchschlager in Pelléas and Mélisande, The Royal Opera – Royal Opera House; David McVicar for directing Agrippina and The Turn of the Screw, English National Opera – London Coliseum	**Pelléas and Mélisande, The Royal Opera – Royal Opera House**; Agrippina, English National Opera – London Coliseum; La fille du régiment, The Royal Opera – Royal Opera House; The Turn of the Screw, English National Opera – London Coliseum
Outstanding Achievement in an Affiliate Theatre
**Gone Too Far! – Royal Court**; Cinderella – Theatre Royal, Stratford East; The Brothers Size – Maria, Young Vic; The cast for That Face – Royal Court
Society Special Award
**Andrew Lloyd Webber**

== Productions with multiple nominations and awards ==
The following 20 productions, including one ballet and four operas, received multiple nominations:

- 11: Hairspray
- 7: Parade
- 6: War Horse
- 5: Macbeth, The Drowsy Chaperone and The Lord of the Rings
- 4: Othello
- 3: Little Shop of Horrors, Pelléas and Mélisande and Saint Joan
- 2: Agrippina, Boeing-Boeing, Dealer's Choice, Elling, Fiddler on the Roof, Jewels, La fille du régiment, The Man of Mode, The Seagull and The Turn of the Screw

The following six productions, including one ballet, received multiple awards:

- 4: Hairspray
- 2: Jewels, Macbeth, Saint Joan, The Man of Mode and War Horse

== See also ==
- 62nd Tony Awards
