= Laurence Olivier Award for Best Newcomer in a Play =

Retired award for London theatre

- Awarded for: Best Newcomer in a Play
- Location: England
- Presented by: Society of London Theatre
- First award: 1980
- Final award: 2008
- Website: officiallondontheatre.com/olivier-awards/

The Laurence Olivier Award for Best Newcomer in a Play was an annual award presented by the Society of London Theatre in recognition of the "world-class status of London theatre." The awards were established as the Society of West End Theatre Awards in 1976, and renamed in 1984 in honour of English actor and director Laurence Olivier.

This commingled award, covering all roles and responsibilities in a production, was introduced in 1980, and was last presented at the 2008 ceremony, after which it was retired. During its existence, the award was not used for 1991–2003, nor 2005–2007.

On the 12 occasions that this award was given, it was presented eight times to a performer (actor/actress), twice to a director, once to a writer and once to an entire theatre company. The company, and one of the two directors, were honoured based on a collection of works during their award-winning year.

== Winners and nominees ==
=== 1980s ===
Year	Actor	Play	Role
1980
1980	Edward Duke	Jeeves Takes Charge	Various Characters
1980	Alfred Molina	Oklahoma!	Jud Fry
1980	Gavin Richards	Accidental Death of an Anarchist	Maniac
1980	Robert Walker	Pal Joey	Director
1981
1981	Alice Krige	Arms and the Man	Raina
1981	Catherine Hall	Naked Robots	Gemma
1981	Jeremy Nicholas	Three Men in a Boat	Various Characters
1981	Eric Peterson	Billy Bishop Goes to War	Billy Bishop
1982
1982	Kenneth Branagh	Another Country	Tommy Judd
1982	Rupert Everett	Another Country	Guy Bennett
1982	Terry Johnson	Insignificance	Playwright
1982	Imelda Staunton	The Beggar's Opera	Lucy Lockit
1983
1983	John Retallack	Quixote and The Provok'd Wife	Director
1983	Arturo Brachetti	Y	Producer
1983	Billy McColl	The Slab Boys Trilogy	Phil
1983	Abigail McKern	As You Like It	Celia
1984
1984	Tim Flavin	On Your Toes	Junior
1984	Henry Goodman	The Comedy of Errors	Dromio of Ephesus
1984	Hilary Blecher, Sandra Kotzé and Elsa Joubert	Poppie Nongena	Directors
1984	Clare Leach	42nd Street	Peggy Sawyer
1985
1985	Cheek by Jowl	Andromache, Pericles and Vanity Fair	Company
1985	Frances Barber	Camille	Marguerite
1985	Druid Theatre Company	The Playboy of the Western World	Company
1985	Clive Mantle	Of Mice and Men	Lennie
1986
1986	Sally Dexter	Dalliance	Mizi
1986	Simon Curtis	Road and Ourselves Alone	Director
1986	Anne Devlin	Ourselves Alone	Writer
1986	Janet McTeer	The Grace of Mary Traverse	Mary Traverse
1987
1987	Suzan Sylvester	A View from the Bridge	Catherine
1987	Rudi Davies	A Penny for a Song and A Lie of the Mind	Dorcas Bellboys / Sally
1987	Nick Dear	The Art of Success	Writer
1987	Imogen Stubbs	Two Noble Kinsmen and The Rover	Gaoler's Daughter / Helena
1988
1988	Richard Jones	Too Clever by Half	Director
1988	Andrew Castell	Journey's End	Raleigh
1988	Alan Cumming	The Conquest of the South Pole	Slupianek
1988	Tim Luscombe	Easy Virtue, The Browning Version and Harlequinade	Director
1989/90
1989/90	Jeremy Northam	The Voysey Inheritance	Edward Voysey
1989/90	Glen Goei	M. Butterfly	Song Liling
1989/90	Charlotte Keatley	My Mother Said I Never Should	Writer
1989/90	Georgia Slowe	Romeo and Juliet	Juliet

=== 2000s ===
Year	Actor	Play	Role
2004
2004	Debbie Tucker Green	Born Bad	Writer
2004	Tom Hardy	In Arabia We'd All Be Kings	Skank
2004	Ruth Negga	Duck	Cat
2004	Lucy Prebble	The Sugar Syndrome	Writer
2008
2008	Tom Hiddleston	Cymbeline	Posthumus Leonatus / Cloten
2008	David Dawson	The Life and Adventures of Nicholas Nickleby	Smike
2008	Tom Hiddleston	Othello	Cassio
2008	Stephen Wight	Dealer's Choice	Mugsy

== See also ==
- Drama Desk Award for Outstanding Actor in a Play
- Tony Award for Best Actor in a Play
