= 1986 Laurence Olivier Awards =

Edition of London theatre awards

- Date: 7 December 1986
- Location: Royalty Theatre

Television/radio coverage
- Network: BBC Television

The 1986 Laurence Olivier Awards were presented by the Society of London Theatre on 7 December 1986 at the Royalty Theatre in London, celebrating excellence in West End theatre. It was broadcast by BBC Television, though the broadcast date and specific BBC station is not available – the 2003 Oliviers, for example, aired on BBC Two the evening after the live event.

== Winners and nominees ==
Details of winners (in bold) and nominees, in each award category, per the Society of London Theatre.

Play of the Year	Musical of the Year
**Les liaisons dangereuses by Christopher Hampton – RSC at The Pit / Ambassadors**; Ourselves Alone by Anne Devlin – Royal Court; The American Clock by Arthur Miller – National Theatre Cottesloe; The Normal Heart by Larry Kramer – Royal Court	**The Phantom of the Opera – Her Majesty's**; Chess – Prince Edward; H.M.S. Pinafore – Old Vic; Wonderful Town – Queen's
Comedy of the Year
**When We Are Married by J. B. Priestley – Whitehall**; A Midsummer Night's Dream by William Shakespeare – RSC at the Barbican; Lend Me a Tenor by Ken Ludwig – Globe; The Merry Wives of Windsor by William Shakespeare – RSC at the Barbican
Actor of the Year	Actress of the Year
**Albert Finney as Harold in Orphans – Apollo**; Derek Jacobi as Alan Turing in Breaking the Code – Theatre Royal Haymarket; Ian McKellen as Yermolai Alexeievitch Lopakhin in The Cherry Orchard – National Theatre Cottesloe; Martin Sheen as Ned Weeks in The Normal Heart – Royal Court	**Lindsay Duncan as Marquise de Merteuil in Les liaisons dangereuses – RSC at The Pit / Ambassadors**; Julia McKenzie as Susan in Woman in Mind – Vaudeville; Juliet Stevenson as Rosalind in As You Like It – RSC at the Barbican, as Madame de Tourvel in Les liaisons dangereuses – RSC at The Pit / Ambassadors and as Cressida in Troilus and Cressida – RSC at the Barbican Pit; Irene Worth as Valentina Nrovka in The Bay at Nice – National Theatre Cottesloe
Outstanding Performance of the Year by an Actor in a Musical	Outstanding Performance of the Year by an Actress in a Musical
**Michael Crawford as Erik the Phantom in The Phantom of the Opera – Her Majesty's**; Paul Bentley as Captain Corcoran in H.M.S. Pinafore – Old Vic; George Hearn as Albin in La Cage aux Folles – London Coliseum; Tommy Korberg as The Russian in Chess – Prince Edward	**Lesley Mackie as Judy Garland in Judy – Strand**; Maureen Lipman as Ruth Sherwood in Wonderful Town – Queen's; Elaine Paige as Florence in Chess – Prince Edward; Angela Richards as Herself in Side by Side by Sondheim – Royal Court
Comedy Performance of the Year
**Bill Fraser as Gerald Forbes in When We Are Married – Whitehall**; Brian Cox as John Tarleton in Misalliance – RSC at the Barbican; Nigel Hawthorne as Mr. Posket in The Magistrate – National Theatre Lyttelton; Paul Scofield as Nat in I'm Not Rappaport – Apollo
Outstanding Performance of the Year in a Supporting Role	Most Promising Newcomer of the Year in Theatre
**Paul Jesson as Felix Turner in The Normal Heart – Royal Court**; Janet Dale as Emilia in Othello and as Mistress Margaret Page in The Merry Wives of Windsor – RSC at the Barbican; Nicky Henson as Touchstone in As You Like It and as Master Frank Ford in The Merry Wives of Windsor – RSC at the Barbican; Fiona Shaw as Celia in As You Like It and as Erika Bruckner in Mephisto – RSC at the Barbican	**Sally Dexter as Mizi in Dalliance – National Theatre Lyttelton**; Simon Curtis for directing Ourselves Alone and Road – Royal Court; Anne Devlin for writing Ourselves Alone – Royal Court; Janet McTeer as Mary Traverse in The Grace of Mary Traverse – Royal Court
Director of the Year
**Bill Alexander for The Merry Wives of Windsor – RSC at the Barbican**; Howard Davies for Les liaisons dangereuses – RSC at The Pit / Ambassadors; Declan Donnellan for A Midsummer Night's Dream – Donmar Warehouse; Peter Wood for The American Clock – National Theatre Cottesloe
Designer of the Year
**William Dudley for Futurists – National Theatre Cottesloe, Kafka's Dick – Royal Court and The Merry Wives of Windsor – RSC at the Barbican**; Maria Björnson for The Phantom of the Opera – Her Majesty's; Bob Crowley for As You Like It – RSC at the Barbican and Les liaisons dangereuses – RSC at The Pit / Ambassadors; Carl Toms for Dalliance and The Magistrate – National Theatre Lyttelton
Outstanding Achievement of the Year in Dance	Outstanding Achievement in Opera
**Ballet Rambert for its 60th Anniversary Season – Sadler's Wells**; The ensemble, Bolshoi Ballet – London Coliseum; Michael Clark for his individual impact and contribution; Irek Mukhamedov for principal dancing, Bolshoi Ballet – London Coliseum; Jerome Robbins for a range of work performed by three companies; Jorge Salavisa for artistic directing, Ballet Gulbenkian	**Thomas Allen and Graham Clark in Doctor Faust, English National Opera – London Coliseum**; Harrison Birtwistle in The Mask of Orpheus, English National Opera – London Coliseum; Anne Evans in The Ring Cycle, Welsh National Opera; Kathryn Harries in The Ring Cycle, Welsh National Opera; Stefanos Lazaridis for set designing Doctor Faust / The Mikado, English National Opera – London Coliseum
Award for Outstanding Achievement
**The House of Bernarda Alba – Lyric Hammersmith**; Barbara Cook for performing – Donmar Warehouse / Albery; The Gambler – Hampstead; Robert Holman for writing Making Noise Quietly – Bush

== Productions with multiple nominations and awards ==
The following 15 productions, including two operas, received multiple nominations:

- 5: Les liaisons dangereuses and The Merry Wives of Windsor
- 4: As You Like It
- 3: Chess, Doctor Faust, Ourselves Alone, The Normal Heart and The Phantom of the Opera
- 2: A Midsummer Night's Dream, Dalliance, H.M.S. Pinafore, The American Clock, The Magistrate, The Ring Cycle, When We Are Married and Wonderful Town

The following four productions received multiple awards:

- 2: Les liaisons dangereuses, The Merry Wives of Windsor, The Phantom of the Opera and When We Are Married

== See also ==
- 40th Tony Awards
