= Laurence Olivier Award for Best Lighting Design =

Annual award for London theatre

- Awarded for: Best Lighting Design
- Location: England
- Presented by: Society of London Theatre
- First award: 1991
- Currently held by: Aideen Malone & Roland Horvath for Into the Woods (2026)
- Website: officiallondontheatre.com/olivier-awards/

The Laurence Olivier Award for Best Lighting Design is an annual award presented by the Society of London Theatre in recognition of the "world-class status of London theatre." The awards were established as the Society of West End Theatre Awards in 1976, and renamed in 1984 in honour of English actor and director Laurence Olivier.

This award was introduced in 1991. There had been an award for Designer of the Year from 1976 to 1990, originally focused on set designers but including an increasing number of commingled nominations for other design specialties through the years. The commingled single award was retired after the 1990 ceremony, with more granular awards introduced in 1991 for Best Set Design and Best Costume Design, along with this Best Lighting Design award.

== Winners and nominees ==
=== 1990s ===
Year	Designer	Production
1991
1991	Jean Kalman	Richard III and White Chameleon
1991	Alan Burrett	Three Sisters
1991	Pat Collins	The Illusion
1991	Paul Pyant	The Wind in the Willows
1992
1992	Mark Henderson	Murmuring Judges and Long Day's Journey into Night
1992	Wayne Dowdeswell	Edward II
1992	Jean Kalman	The Night of the Iguana and Hedda Gabler
1992	Sumio Yoshii	Tango at the End of Winter
1993
1993	Howell Binkley	Kiss of the Spider Woman
1993	Paule Constable	The Street of Crocodiles
1993	Rick Fisher	An Inspector Calls
1993	Jean Kalman	A Midsummer Night's Dream
1994
1994	Rick Fisher	Hysteria, Machinal and Moonlight
1994	Wayne Dowdeswell	Medea
1994	Terry Hands and Wayne Dowdeswell	Tamburlaine the Great
1994	Brian Harris	The School of Night
1995
1995	Mark Henderson	All his work during the year
1995	Rick Fisher	The Cryptogram and Pericles
1995	David Hersey	Glengarry Glen Ross and Oliver!
1995	Tina MacHugh	Ghosts and Rutherford and Son
1996
1996	David Hersey	Burning Blue, The Glass Menagerie and Twelfth Night
1996	Mark Henderson	Absolute Hell, La Grande Magia and Indian Ink
1996	Peter Mumford	Richard II, Mother Courage and Her Children and Volpone
1996	Chris Parry	A Midsummer Night's Dream and The Way of the World
1997
1997	Chris Parry	Tommy
1997	Mark Henderson	John Gabriel Borkman
1997	David Hersey	Martin Guerre
1997	Hugh Vanstone	'Art'
1998
1998	Rick Fisher	Chips with Everything and Lady in the Dark
1998	Paul Anderson	The Chairs
1998	Howard Harrison	The Fix
1998	Hugh Vanstone	Hamlet
1999
1999	Hugh Vanstone	The Blue Room and The Unexpected Man
1999	Paule Constable	Amadeus and Uncle Vanya
1999	Mark Henderson	Britannicus and Phèdre
1999	David Hersey	Oklahoma!

=== 2000s ===
Year	Designer	Production
2000
2000	Mark Henderson	Plenty, Spend Spend Spend, Suddenly, Last Summer, The Forest, The Lion, the Witch and the Wardrobe, The Real Thing and Vassa
2000	Howard Harrison	Private Lives, Sleep With Me and The Tempest
2000	Donald Holder	The Lion King
2000	Peter Mumford	Collected Stories, Richard III, Summerfolk and The Merchant of Venice
2001
2001	Hugh Vanstone	The Cherry Orchard and The Graduate
2001	Howard Harrison	To the Green Fields Beyond and The Witches of Eastwick
2001	Mark Henderson	All My Sons
2001	Paul Pyant	Hamlet
2002
2002	Mark Henderson	A Midsummer Night's Dream and The Playboy of the Western World
2002	Howard Harrison	Cat on a Hot Tin Roof and Tales from Hollywood
2002	David Hersey	My Fair Lady and South Pacific
2002	Tim Mitchell	Henry IV
2002	Peter Mumford	Hamlet and Private Lives
2003
2003	Peter Mumford	The Bacchae
2003	Paule Constable	Play Without Words
2003	David Hersey	The Coast of Utopia
2003	Paul Pyant	A Streetcar Named Desire
2004
2004	Hugh Vanstone	Pacific Overtures
2004	Simon Corder	Hitchcock Blonde
2004	Howard Harrison	Ragtime
2005
2005	Paule Constable	His Dark Materials
2005	Howard Harrison	Mary Poppins
2005	Jean Kalman	Festen
2005	Paul Pyant	All's Well That Ends Well
2006
2006	Paule Constable	Don Carlos
2006	Rick Fisher	Billy Elliot
2006	Howard Harrison	Guys and Dolls
2006	Hugh Vanstone	Mary Stuart
2007
2007	Natasha Chivers and Mike Robertson	Sunday in the Park with George
2007	Neil Austin	Thérèse Raquin
2007	Jean Kalman	The Crucible
2007	Kenneth Posner	Wicked
2007	Hugh Vanstone	Spamalot
2008
2008	Howard Harrison	Macbeth
2008	Paule Constable	War Horse
2008	Kenneth Posner	Hairspray
2008	Paul Pyant	The Lord of the Rings
2009
2009	Paule Constable	The Chalk Garden
2009	Neil Austin	No Man's Land
2009	Neil Austin	Piaf
2009	Paule Constable	Ivanov

=== 2010s ===
Year	Designer	Production
2010
2010	Mark Henderson	Burnt by the Sun
2010	Kevin Adams	Spring Awakening
2010	Jon Clark	Three Days of Rain
2010	Mark Henderson	ENRON
2011
2011	Neil Austin	The White Guard
2011	Paule Constable	Love Never Dies
2011	Mark Henderson	After the Dance
2011	Hugh Vanstone	Deathtrap
2012
2012	Bruno Poet	Frankenstein
2012	Howard Harrison	Anna Christie
2012	Hugh Vanstone	Ghost
2012	Hugh Vanstone	Matilda
2013
2013	Paule Constable	The Curious Incident of the Dog in the Night-Time
2013	Paul Anderson	The Master and Margarita
2013	Lee Curran	Constellations
2013	Mark Henderson	Sweeney Todd: The Demon Barber of Fleet Street
2014
2014	Tim Lutkin and Finn Ross	Chimerica
2014	Paul Pyant and Jon Driscoll	Charlie and the Chocolate Factory
2014	Paule Constable	The Light Princess
2014	Peter Mumford	Ghosts
2015
2015	Howard Harrison	City of Angels
2015	Jon Clark	King Charles III
2015	Paule Constable and David Plater	Wolf Hall and Bring Up the Bodies
2015	Jan Versweyveld	A View from the Bridge
2016
2016	Mark Henderson	Gypsy
2016	Neil Austin	The Winter's Tale
2016	Natasha Chivers	Oresteia
2016	James Farncombe	People, Places and Things
2017
2017	Neil Austin	Harry Potter and the Cursed Child
2017	Lee Curran	Jesus Christ Superstar
2017	Natasha Katz	The Glass Menagerie
2017	Hugh Vanstone	Groundhog Day
2018
2018	Howell Binkley	Hamilton
2018	Paule Constable	Angels in America
2018	Paule Constable	Follies
2018	Jan Versweyveld	Network
2019
2019	Jon Clark	The Inheritance
2019	Neil Austin	Company
2019	Howell Binkley	Come from Away
2019	Lee Curran	Summer and Smoke

=== 2020s ===
Year	Designer	Production
2020
2020	Paule Constable	The Ocean at the End of the Lane
2020	Neil Austin	Rosmersholm
2020	Howard Hudson	& Juliet
2020	Bruno Poet	Uncle Vanya
2021	Not presented due to extended closing of theatre productions during COVID-19 pandemic (Note: Due to late March 2020 to late July 2021 closing of London theatre productions during the COVID-19 pandemic in England, the 2022 awards recognise productions that launched anytime from February 2020 to February 2022)	
2022
2022	Andrzej Goulding and Tim Lutkin	Life of Pi
2022	Neil Austin	Frozen
2022	Isabella Byrd	Cabaret
2022	Tim Lutkin	Back to the Future: The Musical
2023
2023	Jessica Hung Han Yun	My Neighbour Totoro
2023	Natasha Chivers	Prima Facie
2023	Lee Curran	A Streetcar Named Desire
2023	Tim Lutkin	The Crucible
2024
2024	Jack Knowles	Sunset Boulevard
2024	Jon Clark	Dear England
2024	Jon Clark	Stranger Things: The First Shadow
2024	Paule Constable	Guys and Dolls
2025
2025	Paule Constable & Ben Jacobs	Oliver!
2025	Howard Hudson	Natasha, Pierre & The Great Comet of 1812
2025	Howard Hudson	Starlight Express
2025	Aideen Malone	Fiddler on the Roof
2026
2026	Roland Horvath & Aideen Malone	Into the Woods
2026	Robbie Butler	Punch
2026	Jon Clark	Evita
2026	Joshua Pharo	Kenrex

== Multiple Wins ==
=== 6 wins ===
- Paule Constable (2 consecutive)
- Mark Henderson

=== 3 wins ===
- Hugh Vanstone

=== 2 wins ===
- Neil Austin
- Howell Binkley
- Rick Fisher
- Tim Lutkin

== See also ==
- Tony Award for Best Lighting Design
