= Laurence Olivier Award for Best Costume Design =

Annual award for London theatre

- Awarded for: Best Costume Design
- Location: England
- Presented by: Society of London Theatre
- First award: 1991
- Currently held by: Gabriella Slade (costume design), Tahra Zafar (Paddington design) for Paddington: The Musical (2026)
- Website: officiallondontheatre.com/olivier-awards/

The Laurence Olivier Award for Best Costume Design is an annual award presented by the Society of London Theatre in recognition of the "world-class status of London theatre." The awards were established as the Society of West End Theatre Awards in 1976 and renamed in 1984 in honour of English actor and director Laurence Olivier.

This award was introduced in 1991. There had been an award for Designer of the Year from 1976 to 1990, originally focused on set designers but including an increasing number of commingled nominations for other design specialties through the years. The commingled single award was retired after the 1990 ceremony, with more granular awards introduced in 1991 for Best Set Design and Best Lighting Design, along with this Best Costume Design award.

== Winners and nominees ==
=== 1990s ===
Year	Designer	Production
1991
1991	Jasper Conran	The Rehearsal
1991	Sue Blane	Into the Woods
1991	Tom Cairns	Sunday in the Park with George
1991	Mark Thompson	The Wind in the Willows
1992
1992	Mark Thompson	The Comedy of Errors
1992	Ashley Martin-Davis	The Miser
1992	James Merifield	The Boys from Syracuse
1992	Philip Prowse	A Woman of No Importance
1993
1993	William Dudley	Heartbreak House and The Rise and Fall of Little Voice
1993	Bob Crowley	Carousel and Hamlet
1993	Anthony Powell	Hay Fever and Trelawny of the 'Wells'
1993	Carl Toms	An Ideal Husband
1994
1994	Gerald Scarfe	An Absolute Turkey
1994	Sue Blane	Antony and Cleopatra
1994	Johan Engels	Tamburlaine the Great
1994	Anthony Ward	The Winter's Tale
1995
1995	Deirdre Clancy	Love's Labour's Lost and A Month in the Country
1995	Stephen Brimson Lewis	Design for Living and Les Parents terribles
1995	David Charles and Jane Greenwood	She Loves Me
1995	Clare Mitchell	Le Cid and Saint Joan
1996
1996	Anthony Ward	A Midsummer Night's Dream and The Way of the World
1996	Deirdre Clancy	Absolute Hell and Twelfth Night
1996	Nicky Gillibrand	A Little Night Music
1996	Richard Hudson	Volpone
1997
1997	Tim Goodchild	The Relapse
1997	Louise Belson	By Jeeves
1997	William Dudley	Mary Stuart
1997	David C. Woolard	Tommy
1998
1998	Tim Goodchild	Three Hours After Marriage
1998	Nicky Gillibrand	Lady in the Dark
1998	Ann Hould-Ward	Beauty and the Beast
1998	William Ivey Long	Chicago
1999
1999	William Dudley	Amadeus and The London Cuckolds
1999	Maria Björnson	Britannicus and Phèdre
1999	Bunny Christie	As You Like It
1999	Robert Jones	Henry VIII

=== 2000s ===
Year	Designer	Production
2000
2000	Julie Taymor	The Lion King
2000	Rob Howell	Money and Troilus and Cressida
2000	Robert Jones	The Winter's Tale
2000	Elise and John Napier	Candide
2001
2001	Alison Chitty	Remembrance of Things Past
2001	Gregg Barnes	Pageant
2001	Bob Crowley	Cressida and The Witches of Eastwick
2001	Roger Kirk	The King and I
2002
2002	Jenny Beavan	Private Lives
2002	Martin Pakledinaz	Kiss Me, Kate
2002	Kevin Pollard	Shockheaded Peter
2002	Anthony Ward	My Fair Lady
2003
2003	Jenny Tiramani	Twelfth Night
2003	William Dudley	The Coast Of Utopia
2003	Mike Nicholls	Taboo
2003	Mark Thompson	Bombay Dreams
2004
2004	Christopher Oram	Power
2004	Mara Blumenfeld	Pacific Overtures
2004	Raimonda Gaetaniat	Absolutely! (Perhaps)
2004	Martin Pakledinaz	Thoroughly Modern Millie
2005
2005	Deirdre Clancy	All's Well That Ends Well
2005	Bob Crowley	Mary Poppins
2005	John Gunter and Mark Bouman	Hamlet
2005	William Ivey Long	The Producers
2006
2006	Es Devlin	The Dog in the Manger
2006	Rob Howell	Hedda Gabler
2006	Christopher Oram	Don Carlos
2006	Anthony Ward	Mary Stuart
2007
2007	Alison Chitty	The Voysey Inheritance
2007	Tim Hatley	Spamalot
2007	Susan Hilferty	Wicked
2008
2008	Vicki Mortimer	The Man of Mode
2008	Gregg Barnes	The Drowsy Chaperone
2008	Rob Howell	The Lord of the Rings
2008	William Ivey Long	Hairspray
2009
2009	Tom Piper and Emma Williams	The Histories
2009	Rob Howell	The Norman Conquests
2009	Christopher Oram	Twelfth Night
2009	Matthew Wright	La Cage aux Folles

=== 2010s ===
Year	Designer	Production
2010
2010	Tim Chappel and Lizzy Gardiner	Priscilla Queen of the Desert
2010	Peter McKintosh	Hello, Dolly!
2010	Christopher Oram	Madame de Sade
2010	Amy Roberts	The Misanthrope
2011
2011	Hildegard Bechtler	After the Dance
2011	Lez Brotherston	Design for Living
2011	Bob Crowley	Love Never Dies
2011	Mark Thompson	London Assurance
2012
2012	Peter McKintosh	Crazy for You
2012	Tim Hatley	Shrek
2012	Rob Howell	Matilda
2012	Catherine Zuber	South Pacific
2013
2013	Jon Morrell	Top Hat
2013	Bob Crowley	The Audience
2013	Jenny Tiramani	Twelfth Night
2013	Anthony Ward	Sweeney Todd: The Demon Barber of Fleet Street
2014
2014	Mark Thompson	Charlie and the Chocolate Factory
2014	Nicky Gillibrand	The Wind in the Willows
2014	Soutra Gilmour	Merrily We Roll Along
2014	Rae Smith	The Light Princess
2015
2015	Christopher Oram	Wolf Hall and Bring Up the Bodies
2015	Robert Jones	City of Angels
2015	Paul Tazewell	Memphis
2015	Alejo Vietti	Beautiful
2016
2016	Gregg Barnes	Kinky Boots
2016	Hugh Durrant	Nell Gwynn
2016	Jonathan Fensom	Farinelli and the King
2016	Katrina Lindsay	Bend It Like Beckham
2017
2017	Katrina Lindsay	Harry Potter and the Cursed Child
2017	Gregg Barnes	Dreamgirls
2017	Hugh Durrant	Cinderella
2017	Rob Howell	Groundhog Day
2018
2018	Vicki Mortimer	Follies
2018	Hugh Durrant	Dick Whittington
2018	Roger Kirk	42nd Street
2018	Paul Tazewell	Hamilton
2019
2019	Catherine Zuber	The King and I
2019	Fly Davis	Caroline, or Change
2019	Anna Fleischle	Home, I'm Darling
2019	Gabriella Slade	Six

=== 2020s ===
Year	Designer	Production
2020
2020	Joanna Scotcher	Emilia
2020	Hugh Durrant	Goldilocks and the Three Bears
2020	Jonathan Lipman	Fiddler on the Roof
2020	Paloma Young	& Juliet
2021	Not presented due to extended closing of theatre productions during COVID-19 pandemic (Note: Due to late March 2020 to late July 2021 closing of London theatre productions during the COVID-19 pandemic in England, the 2022 awards recognise productions that launched anytime from February 2020 to February 2022)	
2022
2022	Catherine Zuber	Moulin Rouge!
2022	Jon Morrell	Anything Goes
2022	Christopher Oram	Frozen
2022	Tom Scutt	Cabaret
2023
2023	Kimie Nakano	My Neighbour Totoro
2023	Frankie Bradshaw	Blues for an Alabama Sky
2023	Hugh Durrant	Jack and the Beanstalk
2023	Jean Paul Gaultier	Jean Paul Gaultier Fashion Freak Show
2024
2024	Marg Horwell	The Picture of Dorian Gray
2024	Bunny Christie & Deborah Andrews	Guys and Dolls
2024	Ryan Dawson Laight	La Cage aux Folles
2024	Hugh Durrant	Peter Pan
2025
2025	Gabriella Slade	Starlight Express
2025	Hugh Durrant	Robin Hood
2025	Sachiko Nakahara	Spirited Away
2025	Tom Scutt	Fiddler on the Roof
2026
2026	Gabriella Slade & Tahra Zafar	Paddington: The Musical
2026	Enver Chakartash	Stereophonic
2026	Linda Cho	The Great Gatsby
2026	Tom Scutt	Into the Woods

== Multiple awards and nominations for Best Costume Design ==
=== Awards ===
Two awards

- Alison Chitty
- Deirdre Clancy
- William Dudley
- Tim Goodchild
- Christopher Oram
- Mark Thompson
- Vicki Mortimer
- Catherine Zuber

=== Nominations ===
Seven nominations

- Hugh Durrant

Six nominations

- Rob Howell
- Christopher Oram

Five nominations

- Bob Crowley
- Mark Thompson
- Anthony Ward

Four nominations

- Gregg Barnes
- William Dudley

Three nominations

- Deirdre Clancy
- Nicky Gillibrand
- Robert Jones
- William Ivey Long
- Catherine Zuber

Two nominations

- Sue Blane
- Alison Chitty
- Tim Goodchild
- Tim Hatley
- Roger Kirk
- Peter McKintosh
- Jon Morrell
- Vicki Mortimer
- Martin Pakledinaz
- Gabriella Slade
- Paul Tazewell
- Jenny Tiramani

== See also ==
- Drama Desk Award for Outstanding Costume Design
- Tony Award for Best Costume Design
