= 2007 Laurence Olivier Awards =

Edition of London theatre awards

- Date: 18 February 2007

The 2007 Laurence Olivier Awards were held in 2007 in London celebrating excellence in West End theatre by the Society of London Theatre.

== Winners and nominees ==
Details of winners (in bold) and nominees, in each award category, per the Society of London Theatre.

| Best New Play | Best New Musical |
|---|---|
| **Blackbird by David Harrower – Albery**; Frost/Nixon by Peter Morgan – Donmar Warehouse / Gielgud; Rock 'n' Roll by Tom Stoppard – Royal Court / Duke of York's; The Seafarer by Conor McPherson – National Theatre Cottesloe | **Caroline, or Change – National Theatre Lyttelton**; Avenue Q – Noël Coward; Porgy and Bess – Savoy; Spamalot – Palace |
| Best Revival | Outstanding Musical Production |
| **The Crucible – Gielgud**; A Moon for the Misbegotten – Old Vic; Donkeys' Years – Comedy; Who's Afraid of Virginia Woolf – Apollo | **Sunday in the Park with George – Wyndham's**; Cabaret – Lyric; Evita – Adelphi; The Sound of Music – London Palladium |
Best New Comedy
**The 39 Steps by John Buchan, adapted by Patrick Barlow – Criterion**; Don Juan in Soho by Patrick Marber – Donmar Warehouse; Love Song by John Kolvenbach – New Ambassadors
| Best Actor | Best Actress |
| **Rufus Sewell as Jan in Rock 'n' Roll – Royal Court / Duke of York's**; Iain Glen as John Proctor in The Crucible – Gielgud; David Haig as Christopher Headingley in Donkeys' Years – Comedy; Frank Langella as Richard Nixon in Frost/Nixon – Donmar Warehouse / Gielgud; Michael Sheen as David Frost in Frost/Nixon – Donmar Warehouse / Gielgud | **Tamsin Greig as Beatrice in Much ado about Nothing – Novello**; Eve Best as Josie in A Moon for the Misbegotten – Old Vic; Sinéad Cusack as Eleanor and Esme in Rock 'n' Roll – Royal Court / Duke of York's; Kathleen Turner as Martha in Who's Afraid of Virginia Woolf – Apollo |
| Best Actor in a Musical | Best Actress in a Musical |
| **Daniel Evans as Georges Seurat and George in Sunday in the Park with George – Wyndham's**; Tim Curry as King Arthur in Spamalot – Palace; Clarke Peters as Porgy in Porgy and Bess – Savoy; Philip Quast as Juan Perón in Evita – Adelphi | **Jenna Russell as Dot and Marie in Sunday in the Park with George – Wyndham's**; Nicola Hughes as Bess in Porgy and Bess – Savoy; Tonya Pinkins as Caroline Thibodeaux in Caroline, or Change – National Theatre Lyttelton; Elena Roger as Eva Perón in Evita – Adelphi; Hannah Waddingham as the Lady of the Lake in Spamalot – Palace |
| Best Performance in a Supporting Role | Best Performance in a Supporting Role in a Musical |
| **Jim Norton as Richard Harkin in The Seafarer – National Theatre Cottesloe**; Samantha Bond as Rosemary in Donkeys' Years – Comedy; Deborah Findlay as Susan in The Cut – Donmar Warehouse; Mark Hadfield as Grivet in Thérèse Raquin – National Theatre Lyttelton; Colm Meaney as Phil in A Moon for the Misbegotten – Old Vic | **Sheila Hancock as Frau Schneider in Cabaret – Lyric**; Anna Francolini as Rose Stopnick Gellman in Caroline, or Change – National Theatre Lyttelton; Tom Goodman-Hill as Sir Lancelot in Spamalot – Palace; Summer Strallen as Maisie in The Boy Friend – Regent's Park Open Air |
| Best Director | Best Theatre Choreographer |
| **Dominic Cooke for The Crucible – Gielgud**; Sam Buntrock for Sunday in the Park with George – Wyndham's; Joe Mantello for Wicked – Apollo Victoria | **Javier de Frutos for Cabaret – Lyric**; Rob Ashford for Evita – Adelphi; Bill Deamer for The Boy Friend – Regent's Park Open Air; Stephen Mear for Sinatra – London Palladium |
| Best Set Design | Best Costume Design |
| **Timothy Bird and David Farley for Sunday in the Park with George – Wyndham's**; Tim Hatley for Spamalot – Palace; Eugene Lee for Wicked – Apollo Victoria | **Alison Chitty for The Voysey Inheritance – National Theatre Lyttelton**; Tim Hatley for Spamalot – Palace; Susan Hilferty for Wicked – Apollo Victoria |
| Best Lighting Design | Best Sound Design |
| **Natasha Chivers and Mike Robertson for Sunday in the Park with George – Wyndham's**; Neil Austin for Thérèse Raquin – National Theatre Lyttelton; Jean Kalman for The Crucible – Gielgud; Kenneth Posner for Wicked – Apollo Victoria; Hugh Vanstone for Spamalot – Palace | **Gareth Fry for Waves – National Theatre Cottesloe**; Mic Pool for The 39 Steps – Criterion; Ian Dickinson for Rock 'n' Roll – Royal Court / Duke of York's |
| Outstanding Achievement in Dance | Best New Dance Production |
| **Carlos Acosta in Carlos Acosta, Cuban National Ballet – Sadler's Wells**; Wayne McGregor for choreographing Chroma, The Royal Ballet – Royal Opera House; Steven McRae in Chroma and Homage to the Queen, The Royal Ballet – Royal Opera House; Marianela Núñez in DGV: Danse à Grande Vitesse and The Sleeping Beauty, The Royal Ballet – Royal Opera House and Carlos Acosta, Cuban National Ballet – Sadler's Wells | Chroma, The Royal Ballet – Royal Opera House; DGV: Danse à Grande Vitesse, The Royal Ballet – Royal Opera House; Kabuki Fuji Musume and Kasane – Sadler's Wells; The Sleeping Beauty, The Royal Ballet – Royal Opera House |
| Outstanding Achievement in Opera | Outstanding New Opera Production |
| **Amanda Roocroft in Jenůfa, English National Opera – London Coliseum**; John Mark Ainsley in Orfeo, English National Opera – London Coliseum; Joyce DiDonato in Hercules, Les Arts Florissants – Barbican; John Tomlinson in Götterdämmerung, The Royal Opera – Royal Opera House | **Jenůfa, English National Opera – London Coliseum**; Orfeo, English National Opera – London Coliseum; Peter Grimes, Opera North – Sadler's Wells; The Makropoulos Case, English National Opera – London Coliseum |
Outstanding Achievement in an Affiliate Theatre
**Pied Piper – Theatre Royal Stratford East**; Roy Dotrice in The Best of Friends – Hampstead; Love and Money – Maria, Young Vic; Theatre Royal Stratford East for a powerful season of provocative work, reaching new audiences
Society Special Award
**John Tomlinson**

== Productions with multiple nominations and awards ==
The following 22 productions, including four ballets and two operas, received multiple nominations:

- 7: Spamalot
- 6: Sunday in the Park with George
- 4: Evita, The Crucible and Wicked
- 3: A Moon for the Misbegotten, Cabaret, Caroline, or Change, Chroma, Donkeys' Years, Frost/Nixon and Porgy and Bess
- 2: Carlos Acosta, DGV: Danse à Grande Vitesse, Jenůfa, Orfeo, The 39 Steps, The Boy Friend, The Seafarer, The Sleeping Beauty, Thérèse Raquin and Who's Afraid of Virginia Woolf

The following four productions, including one opera, received multiple awards:

- 5: Sunday in the Park with George
- 2: Cabaret, Jenůfa and The Crucible

== See also ==
- 61st Tony Awards
