= Dalliance =

Dalliance may refer to:

- Dalliance (play), a 1986 play by Tom Stoppard
- Dalliance (TV series), an upcoming Australian television drama series
- Dalliance, a 2014 EP by Chase Atlantic
