= Peter McKintosh =

British theatre set and costume designer

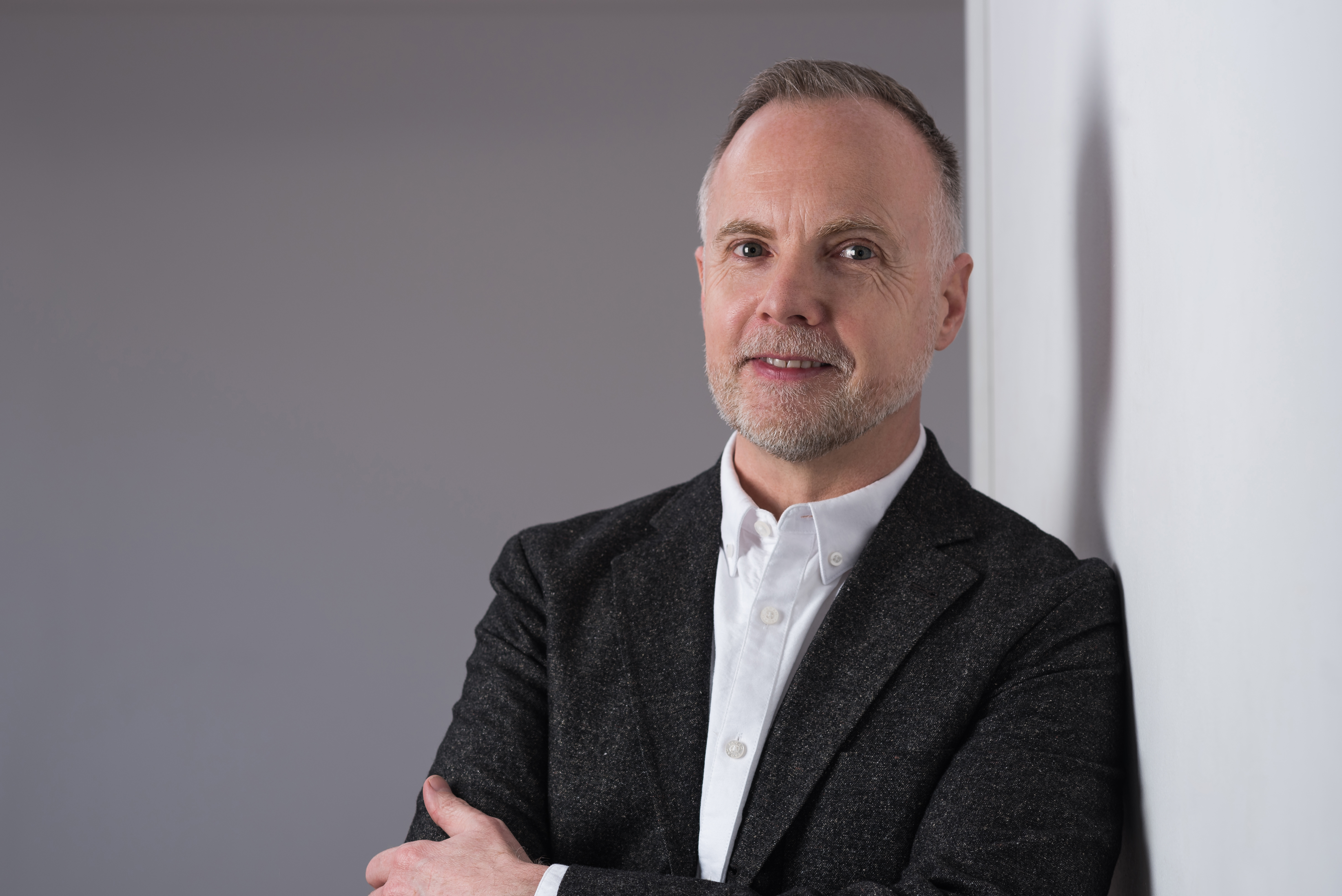
- Born: 1967 (age 58–59); Liverpool, England, UK
- Occupations: Set designer Costume designer

Peter McKintosh is a British costume and set designer. He obtained a degree in Theatre Studies at the University of Warwick and then trained at the Bristol Old Vic Theatre School. He has designed sets and costumes for numerous theatre, opera and dance productions, primarily for the West End Theatre. He won the 2012 Olivier Award for Best Costume Design for a Play for Crazy For You. His designs for The 39 Steps were nominated for the Tony Awards in the Best Set Design and Best Costume Design categories.

== Background ==
Peter McKintosh was born in Liverpool, England in 1967. He attended secondary school at the co-educational private school, Plymouth College. Following this, he completed a term studying architecture at The Bartlett in London before enrolling for a Bachelor of Arts in Theatre Studies at the University of Warwick. During his time there, he participated in the drama's society's recreation of Stephen Sondheim's Company. The performance was a resounding success, so much so that they were paid £1,000 to perform at the Fortune Theatre by Cameron MacKintosh.

He then trained at the Bristol Old Vic Theatre School. Upon graduating, he worked as an assistant for Mark Thompson for seven years on shows like Joseph and the Technicolor Dreamcoat at the London Palladium as well as The Wind in the Willows, Arcadia and The Madness of George III at the National Theatre.

He is now a Patron of the Noël Coward Archive Trust and a founding member of Freelancers Make Theatre Work.

== Career ==
Year	Title	Role	Venue	Ref.
2000	Corruption of Irony	Set & Costume Designer	Widower's Houses, London	
2000	Honk!	Set & Costume Designer	National Theatre, London	
2001	Alice in Wonderland & Through the Looking-Glass	Set & Costume Designer	Barbican Theatre, London. Royal Shakespeare Theatre, Stratford-upon-Avon.	
2003	A Woman of No Importance	Set & Costume Designer	Theatre Royal Haymarket, London	
2003	Brand	Set & Costume Designer	Theatre Royal Haymarket, London	
2004	Just So	Set & Costume Designer	Chichester Festival Theatre, Chichester	
2005	Love Counts	Set & Costume Designer	Almeida Theatre, London	
2005	The Birthday Party	Set & Costume Designer	Duchess Theatre, London	
2006	Donkeys' Years	Set & Costume Designer	Comedy Theatre, London	
2006	King John	Set & Costume Designer	Swan Theatre	
2006	The Cryptogram	Set & Costume Designer	Donmar Warehouse, London	
2007	Fiddler on the Roof	Set & Costume Designer	Savoy Theatre, London	
2007	John Gabriel Borkman	Set & Costume Designer	Donmar Warehouse, London	
2007	The Dumb Waiter	Set & Costume Designer	Trafalgar Studios, London	
2007	The Silent Twins	Set & Costume Designer	Almeida Theatre, London	
2008	The Chalk Garden	Set & Costume Designer	Donmar Warehouse, London	
2008	Waste	Set & Costume Designer	Almeida Theatre, London	
2009	Entertaining Mr Sloane	Set & Costume Designer	Trafalgar Studios, London	
2009	Hello Dolly!	Set & Costume Designer	Regent’s Park Open Air Theatre, London	
2009	Prick Up Your Ears	Set & Costume Designer	Comedy Theatre, London	
2010	Antony and Cleopatra	Set & Costume Designer	Liverpool Playhouse, Liverpool	
2010	Educating Rita/Shirley Valentine	Set & Costume Designer	Menier Chocolate Factory, London	
2010	Love Story	Set & Costume Designer	Duchess Theatre, London	
2011	Crazy For You	Set & Costume Designer	Regent's Park Open Air Theatre, London	
2011	Luise Miller	Set & Costume Designer	Donmar Warehouse, London	
2011	Noises Off	Set & Costume Designer	Old Vic, London	
2011	The Heretic	Set & Costume Designer	Royal Court Theatre, London	
2011	The Knot of the Heart	Set & Costume Designer	Almeida Theatre, London	
2011	The Marriage of Figaro	Set & Costume Designer	Coliseum Theatre, London	
2012	Butley	Set & Costume Designer	Duchess Theatre, London	
2012	The Doctors' Dilemma	Set & Costume Designer	Lyttelton Theatre, London	
2012	Uncle Vanya	Set & Costume Designer	Minerva Theatre, Chichester	
2012	Vida Forever	Set & Costume Designer	Piccadilly Theatre, London	
2013	The Sound of Music	Set & Costume Designer	Regent's Park Open Air Theatre, London	
2013	The Winslow Boy	Set & Costume Designer	Old Vic, London	
2013	The Winslow Boy	Set & Costume Designer	Roundabout Theatre, New York	
2014	Another Country	Set & Costume Designer	Trafalgar Studios, London	
2014	My Night With Reg	Set & Costume Designer	West End Theatre, London	
2015	Harvey	Set & Costume Designer	Theatre Royal Haymarket, London	
2015	Splendour	Set & Costume Designer	Donmar Warehouse, London	
2017	On The Town	Set & Costume Designer	Regent’s Park Open Air Theatre, London	
2017	The Resistible Rise of Arturo Ui	Set & Costume Designer	Donmar Warehouse, London	
2018	Hello Dolly!	Set & Costume Designer	Regent’s Park Open Air Theatre, London	
2018	Macbeth	Set & Costume Designer	Sam Wanamaker Playhouse, London	
2018	Seven Brides for Seven Brothers	Set & Costume Designer	Regent's Park Open Air Theatre, London	
2019	Hansel and Gretel	Set & Costume Designer	Regent’s Park Open Air Theatre, London	
2020	The Realistic Joneses	Set & Costume Designer	Ustinov Studio, Bath	
2021	Shining City	Set & Costume Designer	Theatre Royal Stratford East, London	
2021	South Pacific	Set & Costume Designer	Chichester Festival Theatre, Chichester	
2021	The Sun, The Moon and The Stars	Set & Costume Designer	Theatre Royal Stratford East, London	
2022	Orlando	Set & Costume Designer	Garrick Theatre, London	
2023	4000 Miles	Set & Costume Designer	Minerva Theatre, Chichester	
2023	Cuckoo	Set & Costume Designer	Royal Court Theatre, London	
2024	Abigail's Party	Set & Costume Designer	Theatre Royal Stratford East, London	
2024	Drop The Dead Donkey: The Reawakening!	Set & Costume Designer	Bath Theatre Royal, Bath	
2024	Sinatra: The Musical	Set & Costume Designer	Birmingham Repertory Theatre, Birmingham	
2024	A View From The Bridge	Set & Costume Designer	Theatre Royal Haymarket, London	
2024	Hello Dolly!	Set & Costume Designer	Théâtre du Lido, Paris	
2024	The 39 Steps	Set & Costume Designer	Trafalgar Theatre, London	
2024	The Deep Blue Sea	Set & Costume Designer	Ustinov Studio, Bath	
2024	The Lover/The Collection	Set & Costume Designer	Ustinov Studio, Theatre Royal, Bath	
2024	The Real Thing	Set & Costume Designer	Old Vic, London	
2025	Top Hat	Set & Costume Designer	Chichester Festival Theatre, Chichester	

== Awards and nominations ==
Year	Award	Work	Category	Ref.
2008	Tony Award for Best Scenic Design for a play	The 39 Steps	Nominated	
2008	Tony Award for Best Scenic Design for a play	The 39 Steps	Nominated	
2010	Olivier Award for Best Costume Design	Hello Dolly!	Nominated	
2012	Olivier Award for Best Costume Design	Crazy For You	Won	
