= Ghost (musical) =

Stage musical based on the 1990 movie

- The official poster for Ghost
- Music: Dave Stewart; Glen Ballard
- Lyrics: Dave Stewart; Glen Ballard; Bruce Joel Rubin
- Book: Bruce Joel Rubin
- Basis: film Ghost by Bruce Joel Rubin
- Premiere: 14 March 2011: Manchester Opera House
- Productions: 2011 Manchester; 2011 West End; 2012 Broadway; 2013 UK tour 2013 US tour 2016 UK tour 2019 UK tour 2024 UK tour Multiple productions worldwide

Ghost is a musical with book and lyrics by Bruce Joel Rubin and music and lyrics by Dave Stewart and Glen Ballard. Based on the hit 1990 romantic fantasy thriller film of the same name, it centres on lovers Sam and Molly, who are attacked as they are returning to their apartment. When Sam dies he becomes caught between the real world and the next. Molly is in danger and Sam cannot leave her. A medium, Oda Mae Brown, helps Sam to get in touch with Molly to warn her.

The musical had its world premiere at the Manchester Opera House in Manchester in March 2011. Ghost then began its West End premiere in summer 2011, opening on 19 July. A Broadway transfer opened in April 2012. It toured the UK in 2013, after the London production closed in October 2012.

== Plot ==
=== Act I ===
Sam Wheat and his long-time girlfriend, Molly Jensen, move into a loft apartment in Brooklyn together ("Here Right Now"). Sam is a banker and Molly a sculptor. Their friend Carl Bruner, one of Sam's co-workers, comes to help them settle in. The three of them are a tight-knit group. Although Sam and Molly are very much in love, Sam shies away from the word "love", which makes Molly visibly uncomfortable. She starts to address it, but soon stops herself. Sam distracts her with a rendition of "Unchained Melody", leaving her insecurities temporarily forgotten.

At work, Sam notices discrepancies with several accounts and is unwilling to let them go, even though he has a date with Molly that evening ("More"). He confides in Carl this discovery, who agrees to keep the findings a secret and also promises to investigate himself, so Sam can keep his date. Sam meets up with Molly, who confesses that she wants to marry him. Sam is taken aback and Molly asks why he never says that he loves her ("Three Little Words"); he assures Molly that while he may not say it in his words, he prefers to tell her in his actions. Molly tells him that she'd still like to hear it every now and again, but his reply reassures her nonetheless. After dinner, they're approached by an armed man that tries to steal Sam's wallet. Sam fights back instead of surrendering, and the two struggle for the gun. It goes off and Sam is fatally shot, leaving Molly to cry out for help. Sam dies. However, instead of following the light, Sam becomes a ghost and stays behind with Molly, invisible to her. He follows her to the hospital, and another ghost explains what he's become ("Ball of Wax"). A trapped Sam struggles to reach out to Molly ("I Can't Breathe").

Back at the apartment, Carl helps Molly clear out some of Sam's old things. She and Sam both struggle to let go of the lives they led. Later when Molly is alone upstairs, Sam's killer sneaks in and begins to rob her. Sam, worried that his killer will hurt her, manages to spook the man and he flees. Needing to know who this man is, Sam pushes himself through the front door with great effort, and follows the man all the way back to his apartment. He finds out that the man's name is Willie Lopez, and that he'll eventually return to Molly's apartment, as he couldn't find what he was looking for. Desperate, Sam then seeks out a psychic, Oda Mae Brown, who seems to be a total fraud ("Are You a Believer?"). By some miracle, she actually hears Sam. He convinces her to go talk to Molly on his behalf - by singing '10,000 Bottles of Beer on the Wall' obnoxiously. In the meantime, Molly is grieving ("With You"). She gets a visit from Oda Mae, but Molly is hesitant to believe her. Sam then had Oda Mae starts parroting things that only Sam would know. Molly comes around, and agrees to listen. Through Oda Mae, Sam tells Molly that he was set up and murdered, urging her that she needs to go to the police. Oda Mae bails as soon as she hears the stakes of the situation. Molly goes to Carl, who tells her that it's crazy, but promises to check it out. She goes to the police, while Carl goes straight to Willie's place. There, Sam discovers the truth: Carl has been embezzling money through the accounts Sam noticed the discrepancies in, and that Carl hired Willie to rob him, which led to his murder. As Molly swears to suspend all disbelief, a drunken Carl wanders the streets trying to convince himself Sam's murder was not his fault ("Suspend My Disbelief/I Had a Life").

=== Act II ===
At the police station, Molly discovers Oda Mae has an extensive criminal record. Shaken and believing the psychic is a fraud, she loses hope and leaves, much to Sam's dismay ("Rain/Hold On"). At their apartment, Molly, in her anger, sits down to do some pottery and turns on the radio. Static is heard and Molly changes the station, but as she turns the dial, "Unchained Melody" suddenly plays. In shock, Molly quickly turns off the radio, but after a moment, she turns it back on and slowly returns to her pottery. Sam, watching, approaches her from behind singing along. As she continues her pottery, Molly begins to get frustrated and starts to lean back as if she can feel Sam. But they are interrupted by, a knock on the door. It's Carl. Molly tells Carl that he was right, that the whole thing was crazy, and that she was just grasping at straws in her grief. He assures her that it's only natural, but she has to move on. He makes a poorly received move on her ("Life Turns on a Dime"). Enraged by this betrayal, Sam manages to break something, and a flustered Molly asks Carl to leave.

With the help of another ghost on the subway, Sam learns how to move objects ("Focus"). He then returns to Oda Mae's place to enlist her help once more ("Talkin' Bout a Miracle"). Instead of resorting to fraud, Oda Mae finds true psychic ability and calls on other spirits. However, while Sam is there, Willie finds her. Oda Mae escapes, running for her life. Sam uses his newfound abilities to spook Willie and chase him away. Willie runs into traffic, where he is hit by a car and dies. But, unlike Sam, he is not offered a white light: He's dragged somewhere completely different. Sam begs Oda Mae to help him protect Molly and to stop Carl from getting to the money

Molly, trying to get her life together and move on, starts selling her pieces at her gallery ("Nothing Stops Another Day"). She apologizes to Carl for pushing him away. Carl, anxiously awaiting a call, waves her off under the guise of having a busy day. At the bank, Oda Mae poses as "Rita Miller," the fictional owner of the account that Carl was extorting. Sam feeds her the correct information and they close the account. Sam goes to find Carl in his office and starts moving objects around the room to scare him. Carl understands this is Sam's spirit and he knows what really happened. Scared, Carl threatens that he'll kill Molly if he doesn't leave him alone and give him the money.

After being handed a check for the amount in the closed account, around four million dollars, Oda Mae tries to take the money and leave the situation for good ("I'm Outta Here"). Sam convinces her to donate the money. The two then go see Molly to warn her about Carl. Still disillusioned, Molly tries to send her away. Sam walks through the door and communicates through Oda Mae the significance of the earrings Molly is wearing. After reading a letter for Sam that Molly has inside the apartment, Molly is able to believe again. She lets the psychic in and Oda Mae explains everything, leaving Molly emotionally distraught. Oda Mae lets Sam use her body to hold Molly and comfort her ("Unchained Melody (Dance)")

Carl arrives, armed, desperate, and frightened for his life, as he owes dangerous drug dealers money. Though he doesn't want to resort to such measures, Carl grabs Molly and holds his gun to her. He tells Sam that if he doesn't tell him where the money is, he's going to kill her. There's a struggle, and Carl is killed. He's dragged away in the same way Willie was earlier.

Now that Carl is gone and Molly is safe, the light returns for Sam. Molly is able to see and hear him. Knowing it's time for him to go, Sam says goodbye to Oda Mae, and regretfully turns to Molly. Sam finally tells Molly that he loves her in the way that she wants to hear and goes into the light ("Finale").

== Productions ==
=== Manchester (2011) ===
The musical had a world premiere try-out at the Manchester Opera House, Manchester, England with performances beginning 28 March 2011 and running through 14 May 2011. It was directed by Tony Award-winning director Matthew Warchus, with set and costume design by Rob Howell, choreography by Ashley Wallen, musical supervision and arrangements by Christopher Nightingale, illusions by Paul Kieve, lighting by Hugh Vanstone, sound design by Bobby Aitken and projection design by Jon Driscoll.

Cast members included Richard Fleeshman as Sam Wheat, Caissie Levy as Molly Jensen, Sharon D. Clarke as Oda Mae Brown and Andrew Langtree as Carl Bruner.

=== West End (2011–2012) ===
The production began previews at the Piccadilly Theatre in the West End on 24 June 2011, with an official opening night gala on 19 July. Reviews for the opening night performance were mixed, although the special effects were praised by critics for their ingenuity and skill. On 13 January 2012, Mark Evans and Siobhan Dillon took over in the roles of Sam and Molly respectively. The production closed on 6 October 2012.

=== Broadway (2012) ===
The musical opened on Broadway at the Lunt-Fontanne Theatre on 23 April 2012, following previews from 15 March Directed by Matthew Warchus, original stars Richard Fleeshman and Caissie Levy reprised their roles, with newcomers Da'Vine Joy Randolph (Oda Mae) and Bryce Pinkham (Carl).

According to Levy, "[For the Broadway production], emotional moments in the show have been fine-tuned, a line or two has been changed here or there...a couple of songs have been replaced, some characters have been tweaked. All for the better." A new "Overture" was added, and "Ball of Wax" has been replaced by a new, but similar song, "You Gotta Let Go".

The production opened to mixed reviews, although it received three Tony Award nominations. Randolph was nominated for the Outer Critics Circle Award for Outstanding Featured Actress in a Musical, while Hugh Vanstone won the award for Outstanding Lighting Design. It was announced on 24 July 2012, that the Broadway production would close on 18 August 2012 after 136 regular performances. A national tour for fall 2013 was confirmed.

=== UK tour (2013–2014) ===
The first UK Tour opened in Cardiff on 10 April 2013, and despite some technical faults, opened to positive reviews. London understudy Rebecca Trehearn stepped into the role of Molly, with Stewart Clarke as Sam, Wendy Mae Brown as Oda Mae and David Roberts as Carl. The 11-month tour closed as scheduled on 8 March 2014 in Oxford.

=== UK tour (2016) ===
Two years after its first tour, the show returned to theatres around the UK, in a new production produced by Bill Kenwright, starring "Girls Aloud" singer Sarah Harding as Molly, and Andy Moss as Sam. Reviews for this new staging were mixed to negative, with many critics and audiences not convinced by the stripped back set design, and panning the performance of Harding in particular, stating that her acting, singing and American accent left a lot to be desired; she later pulled out of the tour due to illness, with Carolyn Maitland taking on the role of Molly in her absence.

=== Germany (2017–2020) ===
The musical had the German premiere in Berlin at the Theater des Westens at the 7 December 2017. Alexander Klaws and Willemijn Verkaik took over in the roles of Sam and Molly respectively. Ghost played 348 times until 7 October 2018. The musical received four awards at the "Broadway World Awards 2018".

=== International tour (2018) and UK tour (2019) ===
In October 2018, the musical played internationally in Dubai, Istanbul and Trieste. Rebekah Lowings and Nial Sheehy played the roles of the heartbroken Molly and ghost Sam. The Bill Kenwright production then toured the whole of the UK, starting on 8 January 2019 at Churchill Theatre, Bromley. Lowings said, "When I first saw the show it took my breath away. The storyline is iconic. The songs are just stunning, the orchestration is beautiful." Sheehy said: "The music we’re singing perfectly suits who we are as characters."

=== UK tour (2024–2025) ===
An UK tour produced again by Bill Kenwright kicked off on 22 August 2024 at the Aylesbury Waterside Theatre, starring Josh St. Clair as Sam Wheat, Rebekah Lowings as Molly Jenson, Jacqui Dubois as Oda Mae Brown, and James Mateo-Salt as Carl Brunner, and closed on 3 May 2025 at the Hull New Theatre.

=== Subsequent productions ===
The first North American tour began at the Proctor's Theater in Schenectady, NY on 14 September 2013. The cast featured Steven Grant Douglas as Sam, Katie Postotnik as Molly, Robby Haltiwanger as Carl, and Carla R. Stewart as Oda Mae Brown.

A debut season in Melbourne, Australia, had been confirmed to open in August 2013. The production was postponed due to "complications with transporting the famously technologically intricate set". The show eventually had an Australian premiere in 2016, opening in Adelaide before touring to Melbourne, Sydney and Perth. The cast featured Rob Mills as Sam and Jemma Rix as Molly.

A 2013 South Korean production starred Joo Won as Sam and Ivy as Molly. In 2014, Christian Bautista played Sam and Cris Villonco played Molly in the 2014 Manila production.

The English Theatre Frankfurt staged the German premiere of Ghost in November 2014. Aaron Sidwell played Carl.

An Asian tour was launched in 2015 in which starred Liam Doyle as Sam, Lucie Jones as Molly, and Andrew Langtree as Carl. There was a second Asian tour which began in 2016. Ghost has also played international destinations including Italy, Czech Republic and Singapore.

The German speaking premiere of Ghost was in 2017 in Linz, Austria. The production starred Riccardo Greco as Sam, Anaïs Lueken as Molly, Peter Lewys Preston as Carl and Ana Milva Gomes as Oda Mae.

The Russian premiere of Ghost took place on 7 October 2017 at the Moscow Youth Palace, starring Pavel Levkin as Sam, Galina Bezruk as Molly and Marina Ivanova as Oda Mae.

On 14 March 2019, Heltemus Production had the Danish premiere of Ghost with the original music, and with Danish translations of book and lyrics. The musical was directed and choreographed by Tobias Larsson and with set design by Rikke Juellund. The production starred Mikkel Moltke Hvilsom as Sam, Frederikke Vedel as Molly, Johannes Nymark as Carl, and Sara Gadborg as Oda Mae.

A French-language production of Ghost opened on 7 September 2019 at Théâtre Mogador in Paris.

A Japanese production of Ghost is scheduled to run from March 5 to March 23, 2021, at Theater Clie in Tokyo. The play will star Kenji Urai as Sam, Koki Mizuta as Carl, and Kumiko Mori as Oda Mae. Miyu Sakihi and Reika Sakurai are double-cast as Molly.

On 1 October 2024, a concert performance played at the Adelphi Theatre in London's West End with a cast featuring Lucie Jones as Molly and Oliver Tompsett as Sam.

An Israeli language production of Ghost will open on 2025 at Habima Theatre in Tel Aviv.

== Musical numbers ==
In November 2010, four original songs from the musical were made available online from recording sessions at the Abbey Road Studios and the Manchester Exchange Theatre.

The event was recorded and exclusively screened for fans on Ghost's Facebook Page on 26 November 2010. The screenings were called 'Live & Unchained: The Facebook Sessions' and gave the world the first chance to hear the original songs. The whole footage is now available on YouTube. The original cast recording was released via iTunes on 17 July 2011. On the album, "Unchained Melody (Dance)" and "Finale" (labeled as "The Love Inside") are edited into one track.

Act I

- "Overture" – Orchestra
- "Here Right Now" – Molly, Sam, Carl
- "Unchained Melody" – Sam
- "More" – Carl, Ensemble
- "Three Little Words" – Molly, Sam
- "Ball of Wax" – Hospital Ghost, Ensemble≠
- "I Can't Breathe" – Sam≠≠
- "Are You a Believer?" – Clara, Louise, Mrs Santiago, Oda Mae
- "With You" – Molly
- "Suspend My Disbelief"/"I Had a Life" – Molly, Carl, Sam, Ensemble

Act II

- "Rain"/"Hold On" – Molly, Sam, Ensemble
- "Life Turns On a Dime" – Carl, Molly, Sam≠≠≠
- "Focus" – Subway Ghost
- "Talkin' 'Bout a Miracle" – Hospital Ghost, Oda Mae, Ensemble
- "Nothing Stops Another Day" – Molly
- "I'm Outta Here" – Oda Mae, Ensemble
- "Unchained Melody (Dance)" – Sam, Molly
- "Finale" – Sam, Molly

≠Replaced with "You Gotta Let Go" for Broadway and UK Tour. In the UK and US Tours, the role of Hospital Ghost is absent and the song is sung solely by the ensemble.
≠≠Replaced with "Unchained Melody (Sam's Lament)" for the UK Tour and productions thereafter.
≠≠≠Music and lyrical changes, mainly from "Here Right Now", implemented for Broadway and productions thereafter.

== Principal roles and cast members ==
- Listed below are the principal performers (of their respective productions) from all major productions of the musical.

Role	Manchester	West End	Broadway	Linz	Berlin	Hamburg	U.K. Tour
Role	2011		2012	2017		2018	2024
Sam Wheat	Richard Fleeshman	Richard Fleeshman	Richard Fleeshman	Riccardo Greco	Alexander Klaws	Riccardo Greco	Josh St. Clair
Molly Jensen	Caissie Levy	Caissie Levy	Caissie Levy	Anaïs Lueken	Willemijn Verkaik	Roberta Valentini	Rebekah Lowings
Carl Bruner	Andrew Langtree	Andrew Langtree	Bryce Pinkham	Peter Lewys Preston	Andreas Bongard	John Vooijs	James Mateo-Salt
Oda Mae Brown	Sharon D. Clarke	Sharon D. Clarke	Da'Vine Joy Randolph	Ana Milva Gomes	Marion Campbell	Marion Campbell	Jacqui Dubois
Willie Lopez	Ivan De Freitas	Ivan De Freitas	Michael Balderrama	Mischa Kiek	Mischa Kiek	Mischa Kiek	Jules Brown
Subway Ghost	Adebayo Bolaji	Adebayo Bolaji	Tyler McGee	Gernot Romic	Nicolas Boris Christahl	Marius Bingel	Garry Lee
Hospital Ghost	Mark Pearce	Mark White	Lance Roberts	Rob Pelzer	Klaus Seifert	Rob Pelzer	Les Dennis
Clara	Lisa Davina Phillip	Lisa Davina Phillip	Moya Angela	Ariana Schirasi-Fard	Chasity Elaine Crisp	Enny de Alba	Tanisha Butterfield
Louise	Jenny Fitzpatrick	Jenny Fitzpatrick	Carly Hughes	Gina Marie Hudson	Denise Lucia Aquino	Tamara Wörner	Keiahna Jackson-Jones

== Critical reception ==
Charles Isherwood, in his review of the Broadway production for The New York Times, called the musical a "thrill-free singing theme-park ride" and went on to write that "the show relies mostly on elaborate video imagery, modestly ingenious special effects and the familiarity of its ectoplasmic romance to entertain." Further, he believes that the musical has "innocuous, forgettable pop songs..."

The New York Daily News reviewer wrote that the "gee-whiz illusions (a specter seemingly walks through a door, for instance), lavish light displays and supersized projections are the main attractions of this English import. Without eye-popping tricks, the show offers zip in the way of wonder... [the] book... clunks along. The love story gets swamped by numerous scenes and robotic dance numbers about New York’s frantic fast-paced corporate jungle. Some moments seem to exist simply for visuals — Hey, let’s use umbrellas!"

In a more positive vein, the talkinbroadway.com reviewer wrote "Librettist-lyricist Bruce Joel Rubin ... and composer-lyricists Dave Stewart and Glen Ballard have written one of the finest film-to-stage adaptations in current memory, which Matthew Warchus has directed with energy and passion. Add in a better-than-necessary cast led by U.K. actor Richard Fleeshman and Caissie Levy ... both of whom originated their roles in London, and you have an evening that startles with just how good it is. In relative terms, at any rate. I'm not willing to go as far as saying that this is a great musical, or even an objectively good one... But it positively glows by the standards of all this Broadway season's new offerings and the likes of most other recent movie-inspired outings."

== Cast recordings ==
- 2012 Ghost | Original London Cast
- 2017 Ghost | Original Linz Cast
- 2022 Ghost | German Tour Cast

== Awards and nominations ==
=== Original London production ===
Year	Award	Category	Nominee	Result
2012	Laurence Olivier Award	Best New Musical		Nominated
2012	Laurence Olivier Award	Best Performance in a Supporting Role in a Musical	Sharon D. Clarke	Nominated
2012	Laurence Olivier Award	Best Set Design	Rob Howell	Nominated
2012	Laurence Olivier Award	Best Lighting Design	Hugh Vanstone	Nominated
2012	Laurence Olivier Award	Best Sound Design	Bobby Aitken	Nominated

=== Original Broadway production ===
Year	Award	Category	Nominee	Result
2012	Tony Award	Best Performance by a Featured Actress in a Musical	Da’Vine Joy Randolph	Nominated
2012	Tony Award	Best Scenic Design	Rob Howell and Jon Driscoll	Nominated
2012	Tony Award	Best Lighting Design	Hugh Vanstone	Nominated
2012	Drama Desk Award	Outstanding Set Design	Jon Driscoll, Rob Howell and Paul Kieve	Won
2012	Drama League Award	Distinguished Production of a Musical		Nominated
2012	Outer Critics Circle	Outstanding Featured Actress in a Musical	Da’Vine Joy Randolph	Nominated
2012	Outer Critics Circle	Outstanding Lighting Design	Hugh Vanstone	Won
