= Jon Driscoll =

English theatre projection designer (born 1974)

- Born: Jonathan Richard Driscoll; 25 June 1974; Great Yarmouth, Norfolk
- Occupation: Theatre projection designer

Jonathan Richard Driscoll (born 25 June 1974) is an English Olivier Award-winning and Tony Award-nominated theatre projection designer and lighting designer working in the West End and on Broadway. He is a Technical Associate of the National Theatre in London.

== Biography ==
Born in Great Yarmouth in Norfolk, Driscoll attended Sir Roger Manwood's School, Kent after which he studied Theatre Design at Croydon College of Art and Design. He started designing lighting on the London fringe and as assistant lighting designer for lighting designers Mark Jonathan and Paul Pyant.

From 1995 to 2000, he worked as a lighting technician at the National Theatre in London (then under the directorship of Richard Eyre) where he first worked for director Sam Mendes as Paul Pyant's assistant on Othello (1997) starring David Harewood. He would go on to work regularly with Mendes in the future: Richard III (Old Vic, London 2011), Charlie and the Chocolate Factory (Theatre Royal, Drury Lane, London 2013) and King Lear (National Theatre, London 2014).

In a bid to realise his childhood ambition to become a cinematographer he successfully applied to the National Film and Television School in 1999. He studied under cinematographers Ernie Vincze BSC and Brian Tufano BSC.

It was here that he met animator Gemma Carrington with whom he would later develop a regular creative partnership beginning in 2006 with the West End musical Dirty Dancing: The Classic Story on Stage. Together, they would collaborate on design projections for Brief Encounter, Earthquakes in London, Birdsong and Alice's Adventures in Wonderland.

On graduating in 2002 with an MA in Film and Television Cinematography he experienced a shortage of job opportunities in the film industry and turned to video design for the theatre.

One of his first jobs was on the Madness musical Our House at the Cambridge Theatre in London. Notable effects included the use of 16mm film production to create panoramic digital projection backgrounds to accompany the Driving in my car sequence. He is a director of cinelumina, a post-production company in Hoxton, London.

== Notable productions ==
=== Plays ===
- Up for Grabs (West End, 2002)
- Frost/Nixon (West End and Broadway, 2006)
- Brief Encounter (West End, 2007)
- Enron (West End and Broadway, 2009)
- Gethsemane (National Theatre, London, 2008)
- Birdsong (West End, 2010)
- Earthquakes in London (National Theatre, London. 2010)
- Richard III (Old Vic, London, 2011)
- Travelling Light (National Theatre, London, 2012)
- The Effect (National Theatre, London, 2012)
- King Lear (National Theatre, London, 2014)

=== Musical theatre ===
- Our House (West End, 2002)
- Love Never Dies (West End, 2010)
- Ghost the Musical (West End/Broadway, 2011)
- The Wizard of Oz (West End 2011, plus Toronto and North American tour)
- Chaplin The Musical (Broadway, 2012)
- From Here to Eternity (West End, 2013)
- Stephen Ward (West End, 2013)
- Charlie and the Chocolate Factory (West End, 2013)

=== Dance ===
- Alice's Adventures in Wonderland (Royal Opera House, Covent Garden, London, 2012)

=== Concerts and events ===
- Blade Runner (Secret Cinema, 2010)
- The Phantom of the Opera (25th anniversary production at Royal Albert Hall, 2012)
- Before the Dawn (Kate Bush, 2014)

== Awards and nominations ==
- 2008 Critics Circle Award for Best Design, Brief Encounter
- 2010 Obie Award for Best Design, Brief Encounter
- 2010 Laurence Olivier Award nomination for Best Design, Brief Encounter
- 2010 Laurence Olivier Award nomination for Best Set Design with Anthony Ward for Enron (Royal Court and Noël Coward theatres)
- 2012 Laurence Olivier Award nomination as part of the design team for its work on the Royal Ballet’s Alice's Adventures in Wonderland, Royal Opera House, Covent Garden, London
- 2012 Drama Desk Award for Outstanding Set Design 2012 with Rob Howell and Paul Kieve for Ghost the Musical
- 2012 Tony Award nomination for Best Scenic Design of a Musical with Rob Howell for Ghost the Musical
- 2012 Laurence Olivier Award nomination for Best Set Design for Ghost the Musical
- 2013 Drama Desk Award nomination for Outstanding Projection Design for Chaplin The Musical
- 2014 Laurence Olivier Award: Best Lighting Design with Paul Pyant for Charlie and the Chocolate Factory

== General references ==
- Video Projection in Travelling Light Jon Driscoll talks about creating video projections for the National Theatre's production of Travelling Light and replicating the style of early silent cinema. 2012. https://web.archive.org/web/20140405065815/http://www.nationaltheatre.org.uk/video/video-projection-in-travelling-light
- Crossing Over in Form and Dimension, The New York Times, Sunday, 22 April 2012
