= Mic Pool =

Mic Pool is a British sound designer for theater. He won the first Tony Award for Best Sound Design of a Play for his work on the 2008 Broadway production of The 39 Steps.

Pool is an alumnus of Mountview Academy of Theatre Arts.
