= Paule Constable =

British lighting designer

Amanda Paule Constable OBE is a British lighting designer. She is an Associate Director for the National Theatre, the Lyric Hammersmith and Matthew Bourne's company New Adventures.

== Early life and education ==
Originally from North Devon and grown up in a military family, Constable moved across various countries in her youth. Constable thought about pursuing her studies in architecture, then pursuing an English degree at Goldsmiths' College, London. Influenced by the art scene in London in the 1980s, she then decided to combine English with Drama, graduating in 1989, while working in the music business. She has since become a Goldsmith fellow, as well as of Rose Bruford College and Central School of Speech and Drama.

== Theatre career ==
Constable started her career while studying, working for Midnight Design on rock' n' roll concerts design, while starting to develop an interest in the theatre.

Her "big break" came with show The Street of Crocodiles at the National Theatre, for which she was nominated for an Olivier Award for Best Lighting Design at age 26. She also worked on operas, as well as in the theatre, and collaborated extensively with the Royal Opera, English National Opera, Glyndebourne, Opera North, Scottish Opera and Welsh National Opera.

Constable won the 2005, 2006, 2009, 2013, 2020, 2025 Laurence Olivier Award for Best Lighting Design. She was also a nominee for four further productions and for a 2007 Tony Award on Broadway. In 2011 she won the Tony Award for Best Lighting Design of a play for War Horse.

Abroad she has worked in Paris, Salzburg, Strasbourg, Berlin, Brussels, New Zealand, Dallas and Houston. For the Metropolitan Opera in New York she has designed lighting for Satyagraha, Anna Bolena, Don Giovanni, Giulio Cesare, The Marriage of Figaro, and others.

She has created fifteen productions at the National Theatre, including Paul. Her lighting designs are regularly seen at the Royal Shakespeare Company, the Donmar Warehouse, the Royal Court Theatre and with Théâtre de Complicité. In the West End she lit Evita, Don Carlos, The Weir and Amadeus (also Broadway, 1999 LA Critics' Award winner).

Theatre-dance productions in Britain and abroad include productions for Matthew Bourne, Will Tuckett and Adam Cooper.

Constable was the lighting designer for the 2010 25th Anniversary Touring Production of Les Misérables, staged at the Barbican Centre in London. A DVD of the live concert performance at the O2 on 3 October has been released. In 2011, this production performed at the Ahmanson Theatre and Constable won the L.A. Drama Critics Circle Award for Lighting Design.

Constable won Tony awards for her work on War Horse in 2011 and The Curious Incident of the Dog in the Night-Time in 2015.

=== Select stage work ===
For the National Theatre:

- The Normal Heart
- The Ocean at the End of the Lane
- Follies
- Angels in America
- The Light Princess
- The Curious Incident of the Dog in the Night-Time
- War Horse

In London's West End:

- Les Misérables
- Don Carlos (also at Sheffield Crucible)
- The Glass Menagerie
- Cock
- Wolf Hall Parts One & Two
- Oliver!

== Awards and nominations ==
Year	Award	Category	Work	Result
1993	Laurence Olivier Awards	Best Lighting Design	Street of Crocodiles	Nominated
1999	Laurence Olivier Awards	Best Lighting Design	Amadeus	Nominated
1999	Laurence Olivier Awards	Best Lighting Design	Uncle Vanya	Nominated
2001	Laurence Olivier Awards	Best Lighting Design	Play Without Words	Nominated
2005	Laurence Olivier Awards	Best Lighting Design	His Dark Materials	Won
2006	Laurence Olivier Awards	Best Lighting Design	Don Carlos	Won
2007	Tony awards	Best Lighting Design in a Play	Coram Boy	Nominated
2008	Laurence Olivier Awards	Best Lighting Design	War Horse	Nominated
2009	Laurence Olivier Awards	Best Lighting Design	The Chalk Garden	Won
2009	Laurence Olivier Awards	Best Lighting Design	Ivanov	Nominated
2011	Laurence Olivier Awards	Best Lighting Design	Love Never Dies	Nominated
2011	Tony awards	Best Lighting Design in a Play	War Horse	Won
2012	Drama Desk Award	Outstanding Lighting Design	War Horse	Won
2013	WhatsOnStage Awards	Best Lighting Design	The Curious Incident of the Dog in the Night-time	Nominated
2013	Laurence Olivier Awards	Best Lighting Design in a Play	The Curious Incident of the Dog in the Night-time	Won
2014	Laurence Olivier Awards	Best Lighting Design in a Play	The Light Princess	Nominated
2014	Tony awards	Best Lighting Design in a Play	The Cripple of Inishmaan	Nominated
2015	Drama Desk Award	Outstanding Lighting Design	The Curious Incident of the Dog in the Night-time	Won
2015	Drama Desk Award	Outstanding Lighting Design	Wolf Hall	Nominated
2015	Laurence Olivier Awards	Best Lighting Design	Wolf Hall and Bring up the Bodies	Nominated
2015	Tony awards	Best Lighting Design in a Play	The Curious Incident of the Dog in the Night-time	Won
2015	Tony awards	Best Lighting Design in a Play	Wolf Hall Parts One & Two	Nominated
2017	Tonic Award		-	Won
2018	Tony awards	Best Lighting Design in a Play	Angels in America	Nominated
2018	Laurence Olivier Awards	Best Lighting Design	Angels in America	Nominated
2018	Laurence Olivier Awards	Best Lighting Design	Follies	Nominated
2019	Critics' Circle Award	Special Award	-	Won
2020	Laurence Olivier Awards	Best Lighting Design	The Ocean at the End of the Lane	Won
2025	WhatsOnStage Awards	Best Lighting Design	Oliver!	Nominated
2025	Laurence Olivier Awards	Best Lighting Design	Oliver!	Won

== Advocate for women in theatre ==
Constable is also well known for being an advocate and supporting women working in theatre. She is only one of two women who have received the Olivier Award for Best Lighting Design. In an interview she commented: “Women still aren’t represented as well as they should be in theatre. It’s a very male-dominated industry and we need to change that."
