= Nicky Gillibrand =

Theatrical costume designer

Nicky Gillibrand is a theatrical costume designer who was nominated for the Tony Award for Best Costume Design for Billy Elliot the Musical. She won the Gold Medal for Costume Design at the 2003 Prague Quadrenale for the Royal Shakespeare Company's production of A Midsummer Night's Dream

Gillibrand has worked on many international productions with such companies as the Royal Opera House, the Young Vic Theatre, and the Royal National Theatre in London, the Bavarian State Opera in Munich, and the Paris Opera. She also designed the costumes for the 2003 revival of Tom Stoppard's Jumpers for the West End and Broadway and İnstitute Benjamenta.

Billy Elliott was her first assignment for musical theatre. "When I first heard that they were going to be doing a musical version of Billy Elliot, I thought that this would be the musical I would like to do," she said, "and it landed right in my lap." One of her sources was a photographer who spent a year documenting a miner's strike in Durham. "I had some amazing character studies of people, very spot on,” she says. “What it brought home was how old fashioned it was up there, because I'm from the north of England as well. It was quite interesting to look at real stuff and it was a hard brief for myself, because they're real clothes and not particularly theatrical enough." She welcomed the opportunity to design for chorus members who were not typical characters in musicals, and liked working with the vibrant colors of the era. "What we wear nowadays is far more muted than what was available then," she said. "I really enjoyed putting a terrible sweater onstage. You look at it and you know it's dead right, no matter how awful it is."
