= Deirdre Clancy =

British costume designer (born 1943)

Deirdre Clancy (born 31 March 1943) is a British costume designer. She has won the Olivier Award for Best Costume Design twice. She also won the BAFTA Award for Best Costume Design for Mrs. Brown.

She started working in the London theatre in the 1960s and has worked on more than 150 theatre, opera and ballet productions around the world. Clancy's designs on paper and constructed garments are held in the collection of the Victoria & Albert Museum, London.

In 2000 the University of Central England conferred a doctorate on her. Her work has been the subject of a doctoral thesis by Dr Amela Baksic at Louisiana State University.

She is married to composer Maxwell Steer.

== Publications ==
- Costume since 1945: Couture, street style and anti-fashion. Herbert Press (1996) ISBN 978-1871569834
- The 80s and 90s. Costume Source Books. Chelsea House Publishers (2009) ISBN 978-1604133868
- Colonial America (with Amela Baksic). Costume Source Books. Chelsea House Publishers (2009) ISBN 978-1604133806
- Designing Costume for Stage and Screen. Batsford (2014) ISBN 9781849941532
