= Sally Dexter =

British actress

- Born: England, United Kingdom
- Education: London Academy of Music and Dramatic Art
- Occupation: Actress
- Years active: 1986–present
- Known for: Night and Day; Emmerdale

Sally Julia Dexter is an English actress of stage and screen. She won the 1987 Olivier Award for Most Promising Newcomer for Dalliance. Her other West End stage credits include the musicals Oliver! (1994), Sister Act (2010) and Billy Elliot the Musical (2013). Her television credits include the ITV soap operas Night and Day (2001–2003) and Emmerdale (2017–2019, 2021–2022, 2025).

== Career ==
Dexter was educated at Chiltern Edge School, King James's College (now Henley College) at Henley-on-Thames, and the London Academy of Music and Dramatic Art. Her onscreen appearances have included A Touch of Frost, Dalziel and Pascoe, Toast of London, and Family, as well as the long-running Night and Day. As a stage actress, Dexter has appeared in both straight plays and musicals in London's West End. In 1987, she won the Olivier Award for Most Promising Newcomer in Theatre, for her performance in the 1986 production of Dalliance. Her other credits include Nancy in Sam Mendes's 1994 revival of Oliver! at the London Palladium opposite Jonathan Pryce. For her performance in Oliver!, she received an Olivier Award nomination. The Variety reviewer wrote: "If this 'Oliver!' creates any star, it should be RSC alumna Sally Dexter, whose blowsy, huge-voiced Nancy is the career-making performance this actress has long deserved." She also appeared in A Touch of Frost from 1994 until 2003.

Other roles include Mrs. Wilkinson in Billy Elliot the Musical opposite Leon Cooke for 12 months, leaving the show to standing ovations, Lady Macbeth in Macbeth opposite Rufus Sewell, Anna in the original production of Patrick Marber's Closer and Regan in King Lear. She spent several years playing roles with the Royal Shakespeare Company and at the Royal National Theatre, London. She starred in Bad Girls: The Musical at the Garrick Theatre, London in 2007, and can be heard on its original cast recording along with the London Palladium cast recording for Oliver!, and as Madame Giry on the concept cast recording of Andrew Lloyd Webber's Love Never Dies (A role she reprised in a 2023 West End concert). She took over in the role of Mother Superior in the London Palladium production of Sister Act from September to October 2010.

She co-wrote and created the three-part BBC comedy drama series Sugartown, starring Tom Ellis, Sue Johnston and Miranda Raison in 2011. She was cast as Gertrude opposite Michael Sheen in Ian Rickson's Young Vic production of Hamlet, previewing in October 2011. Dexter starred as the White Witch in The Lion the Witch and the Wardrobe at the Threesixty Theatre in Kensington Gardens until 9 September 2012. In 2012, Dexter starred as Simone in the Spice Girls musical Viva Forever!. In 2017, Dexter appeared in the BBC TV series Father Brown episode 5.3 "The Eve of St John" as Selina Crow. Also in February 2017, she joined the Emmerdale cast as Faith Dingle. She also appeared in the comedy Horror movie The Attack of the Adult Babies, and in the BBC TV series Poldark as Mrs. Chynoweth. On 7 October 2019, it was announced that Dexter will be leaving Emmerdale. Her final scenes aired in the episode broadcast on 25 October 2019; however, in 2021, it was announced that Dexter would be reprising her role as Faith. On 28 October 2022 Dexter once again left Emmerdale, when Faith died from cancer. In an unannounced return, Dexter reprised the role for a flashback, which was originally broadcast on 12 November 2025; Dexter called it was "delightful" to return and said that she had been practising an Australian accent in case producers wanted her to play Faith's cousin, who she jokingly called "Hope".

== Awards and nominations ==
Year	Award	Category	Work	Result	Ref.
1986	Laurence Olivier Awards	Best Newcomer in a Play	Dalliance	Won	
2002	British Soap Awards	Best Actress	Night and Day	Nominated	
2017	2017 British Soap Awards	Best Newcomer	Emmerdale	Nominated	
2017	TV Choice Awards	Best Soap Newcomer	Emmerdale	Won	
2017	Inside Soap Awards	Funniest Female	Emmerdale	Shortlisted	
2017	Inside Soap Awards	Best Newcomer	Emmerdale	Shortlisted	
2018	2018 British Soap Awards	Best Comedy Performance	Emmerdale	Nominated	
2018	Inside Soap Awards	Funniest Female	Emmerdale	Nominated	
2018	Inside Soap Awards	Best Bad Girl	Emmerdale	Shortlisted	
2019	Inside Soap Awards	Funniest Female	Emmerdale	Shortlisted	
2022	27th National Television Awards	Serial Drama Performance	Emmerdale	Nominated	
2022	Inside Soap Awards	Best Actress	Emmerdale	Shortlisted	
2022	I Talk Telly Awards	Best Soap Performance	Emmerdale	Nominated	
2023	2023 British Soap Awards	Best Leading Performer	Emmerdale	Shortlisted	
