= Sue Blane =

English costume designer (born 1949)

- Born: Susan Margaret Blane; 23 April 1949 (age 77); Wolverhampton, Staffordshire, England
- Occupation: Costume designer
- Known for: The Rocky Horror Show; The Rocky Horror Picture Show

Susan Margaret Blane, MBE, RDI (born 23 April 1949) is an English costume designer. She is best known for her costume designs for both The Rocky Horror Show and The Rocky Horror Picture Show.

== Life and career ==
Blane studied costume design at Wolverhampton College of Art and at the Central School of Art and Design in London, finishing in 1971.

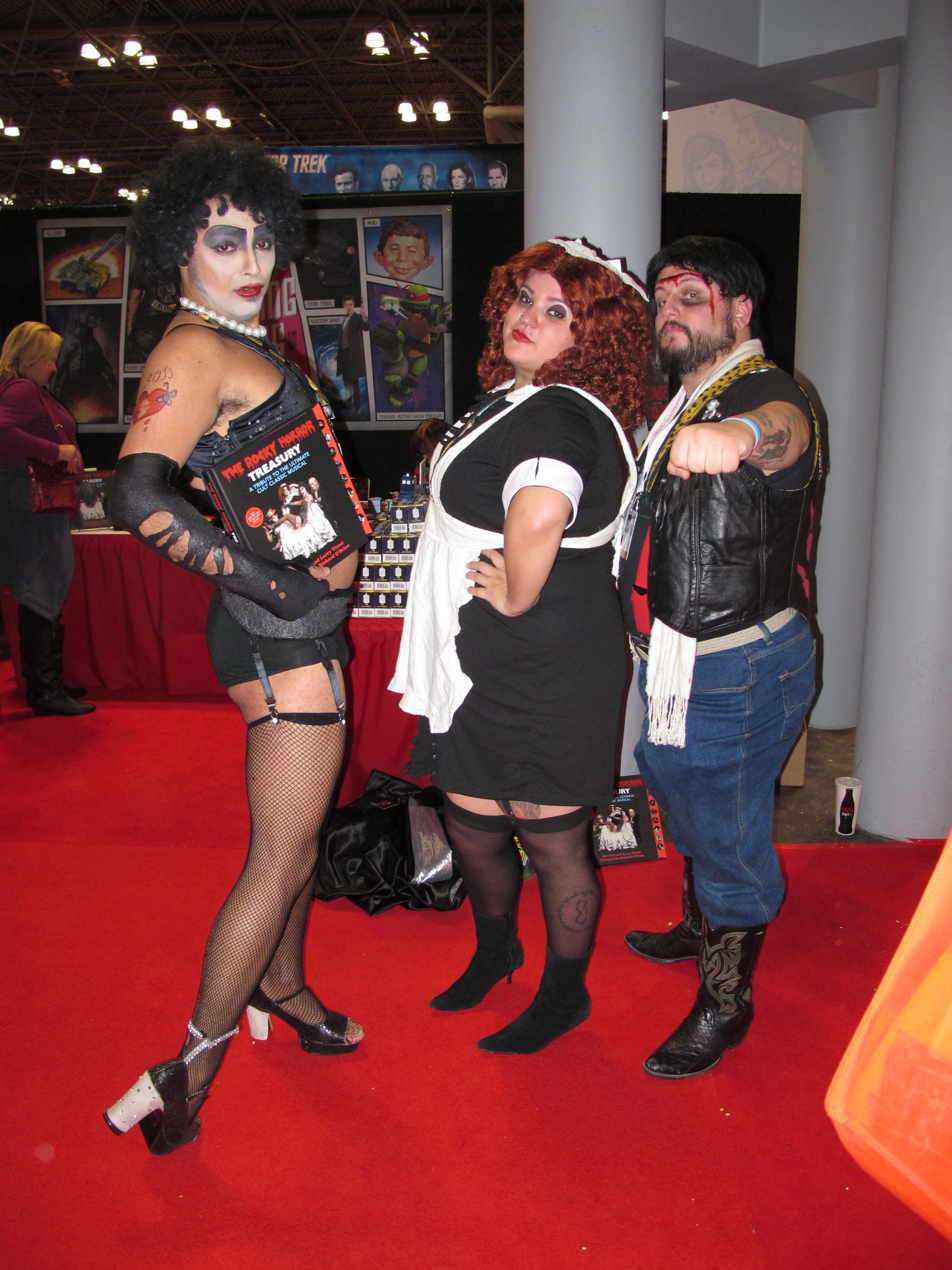
Fashion influenced by The Rocky Horror Show

Before The Rocky Horror Show in 1972, Blane had already met Tim Curry in 1971 at the Citizen's Theatre in Glasgow, where they were both involved in a production of Jean Genet's The Maids directed by Lindsay Kemp. Blane also designed the costumes for other Rocky Horror productions, including the 1975 Broadway production and film, and created the costume designs for the sequel, Shock Treatment (1981).

Since The Rocky Horror Picture Show was released, fans have been recreating the designs as part of screenings audience participation. A common audience "callback" at Rocky Horror showings plays off the similarity of the name "Blane" to the word "blame." When a character in the film says someone – or something – is "to blame," audience members shout, "No, Sue's to Blane!" It is also common for audience members to shout out Blane's name during "Don't Dream It", making the character Dr. Frank-N-Furter seem to say, "I wanted to be dressed by Sue Blane" (instead of "dressed just the same," as written).

Blane also created the costume designs for Jonathan Miller's The Mikado for the English National Opera. Other opera credits include David McVicar's Carmen for Glyndebourne, Keith Warner's Lohengrin for the Bayreuth Festival, Lulu at the New National Theatre, Tokyo, Disney's The Hunchback of Notre-Dame (Berlin): The Love for Three Oranges (Opera North/ENO); The Three Musketeers (Young Vic); Capriccio (Staatsoper, Berlin); Guys and Dolls (RNT); Into the Woods (Old Vic / West End); Porgy and Bess (Glyndebourne) and La Fanciula del West, with Plácido Domingo (La Scala, Milan).

Blane's many production design credits include The Relapse, voted Best Design by What's On readers, (RNT), The Nutcracker and Alice in Wonderland for the English National Ballet; Midsummer Night's Dream (Royal Dramaten Theatre, Stockholm and RSC; Cabaret (Donmar Warehouse); Sylvia (Birmingham Royal Ballet); King John, The Learned Ladies, and Antony and Cleopatra all for the Royal Shakespeare Company; Barber of Seville (Scottish Opera); The Duenna and Thieving Magpie (Opera North); Christmas Eve (ENO) and Lee Miller (Minerva Chichester).

Her designs also featured in English National Ballet's adaptation of Oscar Wilde's novella of The Canterville Ghost conceived and choreographed by Will Tuckett.

In 1997, Blane designed the costumes for Dance of the Vampires in Vienna, directed by Roman Polanski.

== Honours ==
Sue Blane received a BAFTA nomination for Peter Greenaway's The Draughtsman's Contract (1982). And was nominated for a 1997 Laurence Olivier Award for Outstanding Achievement in Dance for her design of English National Ballet's Alice in Wonderland.

Blane received an MBE (Members of the Order of the British Empire) in 2006.
