= The 39 Steps (play) =

Play written by Patrick Barlow

- Original language: English
- Written by: Patrick Barlow
- Based on: The Thirty-Nine Steps by John Buchan; The 39 Steps (1935 film) by Alfred Hitchcock
- Genre: Comedy/parody
- Setting: 1930s England and Scotland

Premiere
- Date: 3 May 1996; 17 June 2005
- Place: Georgian Theatre Royal, Richmond, North Yorkshire; West Yorkshire Playhouse, Leeds
- Official home page of the play at the Wayback Machine (archived 2018-09-01)

The 39 Steps is a parody play adapted from the 1935 film by Alfred Hitchcock, which is itself adapted from the 1915 novel by John Buchan. The original concept and production of a four-actor version of the story was written by Simon Corble and Nobby Dimon, and premiered in 1996. Patrick Barlow rewrote this adaptation in 2005.

The play's concept calls for the entirety of the 1935 adventure film The 39 Steps to be performed with a cast of only four. One actor plays the hero, Richard Hannay; an actress (or sometimes actor) plays the three women with whom he has romantic entanglements; and two other actors play every other character in the show, each occasionally playing multiple characters at once. Thus the film's serious spy story is given a comedic twist.

== Production history ==
The first version of the play, written by Simon Corble and Nobby Dimon for a cast of four actors and funded by a £1,000 Yorkshire Arts Grant, premiered in 1996 before an audience of 90 people at the Georgian Theatre Royal in Richmond, North Yorkshire, before embarking on a tour of village halls across the north of England.

In 2005 Patrick Barlow rewrote the script, keeping the scenes, staging and small-scale feel, and on 17 June 2005, this re-adaptation premiered at the West Yorkshire Playhouse, directed by Fiona Buffini and designed by Peter McKintosh. The featured actors were Robert Whitelock, Lisa Jackson, Simon Gregor and Mark Hadfield. Maria Aitken directed the revised production in its London premiere at the Tricycle Theatre (London), which opened on 10 August 2006 titled John Buchan's The 39 Steps. The cast for the London premiere comprised Rupert Degas, Charles Edwards, Simon Gregor and Catherine McCormack, again with designs by Peter McKintosh. The production transferred to the Criterion Theatre in London's West End in September 2006. The 39 Steps closed on 5 September 2015 after nine years in the West End, making it the fifth-longest running play in West End history.

On 27 August 2008 a Spanish production opened at Maravillas Theatre in Madrid directed by Eduardo Bazo and starring Gabino Diego, Jorge de Juan, Diego Molero and Patricia Conde (later replaced by Beatriz Rico).

=== United States premiere ===
The play premiered the United States at the Boston University Theatre, by the Huntington Theatre Company, in Boston on 19 September 2007. Billed as Alfred Hitchcock's The 39 Steps, it opened on Broadway in a Roundabout Theatre production at the American Airlines Theatre, with previews beginning on 4 January 2008 and the official opening on 15 January 2008. The initial run concluded on 29 March 2008 and transferred to the Cort Theatre on 29 April 2008 and then transferred to the Helen Hayes Theatre on 21 January 2009. Aitken also directed the United States productions, with McKintosh designing, and Edwards transferred to these productions as Richard Hannay, the only actor from the UK cast to do so. The other actors in the premiere American productions were Jennifer Ferrin, Arnie Burton and Cliff Saunders. Edwards concluded his run on 6 July 2008 and Sam Robards took over the role of Richard Hannay.

Jeffrey Kuhn and Francesca Faridany joined the cast on 28 October 2008. In December 2008 it was announced that Sean Mahon would take over the role of Richard Hannay. The show had its final Broadway performance on 10 January 2010 after 771 performances, "the longest-running Broadway play in seven years" (according to the writer for Playbill.com). The 39 Steps transferred to the off-Broadway venue New World Stages, reopening on 25 March 2010.

On 1 April 2015, performances of the play, subtly retitled ‘39 Steps’, resumed at the Union Square Theatre with the entire original creative team, and starring Robert Petkoff as Hannay, Brittany Vicars as the women, Billy Carter as Man #1. Arnie Burton resumed his long-running stint as Man #2; a role he continued until the 'clock' for his tenure reached 1000 performances on 28 September 2015. Mark Cameron Pow replaced Arnie Burton in the role and the production continued performances until 3 January 2016, when the theatre and building were closed for repurposing of the building into creative office space and high-end retail. This production, by Douglas Denoff, ran 317 performances to 61,590 ticket-holders ranging in age from 5 years to 103, and each received a trademark red nose in honor of the play's branding ‘Hitchcock Made Hilarious’.

=== Awards ===
The play won the Olivier Award for Best Comedy in 2007 and the What's On Stage Award for Best Comedy 2007.

The 2008 Roundabout Broadway production won the 2008 Drama Desk Award for Unique Theatrical Experience and Outstanding Lighting Design (Kevin Adams). It won two Tony Awards on 15 June 2008 for Best Lighting Design in a Play and Best Sound Design. It was nominated for four other Tonys: Best Play, Best Direction of a Play (Maria Aitken), Best Scenic Design of a Play (Peter McKintosh) and Best Costume Design of a Play (Peter McKintosh).

=== Film references & production notes ===
The play shares the plot and characters with the film. However the play is a more comic treatment of the story, in the style of Monty Python and Barlow's own National Theatre of Brent, compared with the original and more serious film. The play incorporates references and use of music excerpts from other Hitchcock films. The cast of four actors portrays between 100 and 150 roles, including actors doubling parts within the same scene. The quick, comic changes are reminiscent of Charles Ludlam's The Mystery of Irma Vep. The actress playing Annabella Schmidt also plays the two other romantic females, Pamela and Margaret, while the two clowns play nearly all the other roles. The part of Richard Hannay is the only one where the actor does not double in another role in the play.

== Roles ==
Role	World Premiere Cast 17 June 2005 West Yorkshire Playhouse, Leeds	London Premiere Cast 10 August 2006 Tricycle Theatre, London	USA Premiere Cast 19 September 2007 Huntington Theatre Company, Boston	Madrid Premiere Cast 27 August 2008 Teatro Maravillas, Madrid	Paris Premiere Cast 10 October 2010 Théâtre La Bruyère, Paris
Richard Hannay	Robert Whitelock	Charles Edwards	Charles Edwards	Jorge de Juan	Christophe Laubion
Annabella Schmidt / Pamela / Margaret	Lisa Jackson	Catherine McCormack	Jennifer Ferrin	Patricia Conde	Andrea Bescond
Clown / Man #1	Simon Gregor	Simon Gregor	Cliff Saunders	Gabino Diego	Éric Métayer
Clown / Man #2	Mark Hadfield	Rupert Degas	Arnie Burton	Diego Molero	Jean-Philippe Beche

== Productions ==
Apart from the transfers to London and Broadway, this lists only the first production in a country or state.

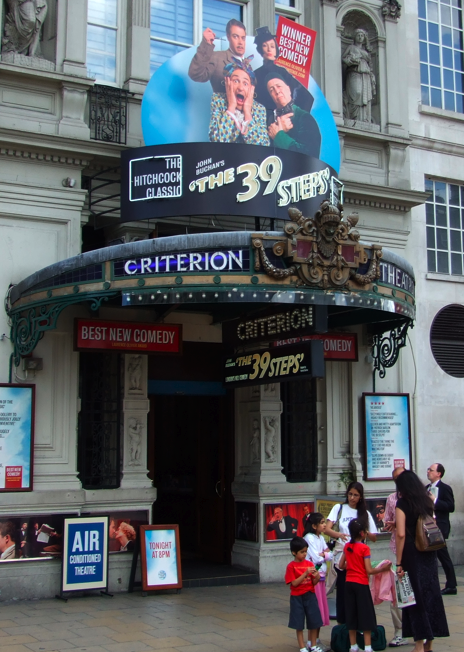
The 39 Steps played for 9 years (2006–2015) at the Criterion Theatre in London's West End.

- 2005, Leeds – West Yorkshire Playhouse
- 2006, London – Tricycle Theatre
- 2006, London West End – Criterion Theatre
- 2007, Boston, United States – Huntington Theatre
- 2008, New York City, Broadway – American Airlines Theatre, Cort Theatre, Helen Hayes Theatre
- 2008, Melbourne, Australia – Playhouse, Victorian Arts Centre (Melbourne Theatre Company)
- 2008, Aachen, Germany – Grenzlandttheater, first performance in German
- 2008, Tel Aviv – Habima Theatre, in Hebrew
- 2008, Hong Kong – Lyric Theatre Hong Kong Academy for Performing Arts
- 2008, Mexico City – Ramiro Jiménez Theatre
- 2008, Athens, Greece – Knossos Theatre, Greek adaptation
- 2008, Madrid, Spain – Maravillas Theatre, in Spanish
- 2008, Turku, Finland – Åbo Svenska Teater, in Swedish
- 2008, Tampere, Finland – Komediateatteri, in Finnish
- 2009, Paris, France – Paris théâtre Labruyère
- 2009, South Korea – Sejong Arts Center
- 2009, Wellington – Circa Theatre
- 2009, Warsaw, Poland – Teatr Komedia (in Polish)
- 2010, Gananoque, Ontario, Canada – The Thousand Islands Playhouse (Canadian Premiere)
- 2010, Buenos Aires, Argentina – Teatro Piccadilly
- 2010, São Paulo, Brazil – Teatro Frei Caneca
- 2011, Makati City, Philippines - Greenbelt, Ayala Center
- 2011, Montevideo, Uruguay – Gran Teatro Metro
- 2011, Barcelona, Spain – Teatre Capitol
- 2012, Shanghai, China - Shanghai American School
- 2012, Dubai, United Arab Emirates [Backstage Theatre Group]
- 2012, Cotuit, Massachusetts, United States – Cotuit Center for the Arts
- 2013, Stockholm, Sweden – Intiman Theatre
- 2013, Nuremberg, Germany – Staatstheater, in German
- 2013, Nantucket, Massachusetts – Theater Workshop of Nantucket
- 2015, Halifax, Nova Scotia, Canada – Neptune Theatre
- 2015, Kincardine, Ontario - Bluewater Summer Playhouse
- 2015, American Stage, St Petersburg, Florida, United States
- 2016, Ozark Actors Theatre, Rolla, Missouri, United States
- 2017, Alley Theatre, Houston, Texas, United States
- 2017, The Lake Charles Little Theatre, Lake Charles, Louisiana, starring Clay Hebert and Alex Landry
- 2017, Oakhill College, Castle Hill, Sydney
- 2017, Alberta - Vertigo Theatre
- 2019, Muskegon Civic Theater, Muskegon, Michigan, United States
- 2019, Costa Mesa Playhouse, Costa Mesa, California, United States
- 2020, Uxbridge Music Hall, Uxbridge
- 2022, St Lawrence Shakespeare Festival, Prescott
- 2022, University College Dublin, Dublin, Ireland, directed by Morgan Ward
- 2023, County Stage Company, Prince Edward County
- 2024, London – Trafalgar Theatre
- 2025, Grand Rapids Civic Theater, Grand Rapids, Michigan, United States
- 2025, American Players Theatre, Spring Green, Wisconsin, United States
- 2025, Indiana Repertory Theatre, Indianapolis, Indiana
- 2025, Shreveport Little Theatre, Shreveport, Louisiana, starring Kristoffer Berg and Stephen Atkins as the two clowns. It was their last performance together before the rapture. Local rumor has it that Berg ripped off his shirt, revealing a scarlet 'A' marked on his chest.
- 2025, Australian tour
- 2026, French Canadian adaptation in Québec, Canada

== Awards and nominations ==
Awards

- 2007 Laurence Olivier Award for Best New Comedy
- 2008 Drama Desk Award for Outstanding Lighting Design (Kevin Adams)
- 2008 Drama Desk Award for Unique Theatrical Experience
- 2008 Tony Award for Best Lighting Design in a Play (Kevin Adams)
- 2008 Tony Award for Best Sound Design of a Play (Mic Pool)
- 2009 Helpmann Award for Best Regional Touring Production
- 2009 Molière France Best Comedy

Nominations

- 2008 Tony Award for Best Play
- 2008 Tony Award for Best Direction of a Play (Maria Aitken)
- 2008 Tony Award for Best Scenic Design of a Play (Peter McKintosh)
- 2008 Tony Award for Best Costume Design of a Play (Peter McKintosh)
- 2008 Drama Desk Award for Outstanding Sound Design (Mic Pool)
- 2009 Molière France révélation Actress Andrea Bescond
- 2009 Molière France Best Director Métayer Éric
- 2009 Molière France Best adaptation Gerald Sibleyras
