= The Cut (play) =

Play written by Mark Ravenhill

The Cut is a 2006 theatre play by Mark Ravenhill. It is a dystopia that relates the life of Paul, a practitioner of a mysterious operation who is greatly disturbed by its practice. Main themes touch upon one's place in the society and the arbitrariness of governments policies which set up the norm against one's morale.

Ravenhill's The Cut is not to be confused with the Mike Cullen play of the same name.

== Plot summary ==
As the play unravels, the cut is presented as a painful, immoral, controversial and ambiguous surgery, that cures a patient or victim from desire, or maybe even personality. It is apparently destined to dissidents and/or sick people but its virtues also make it attractive as a mean of freedom and salvation. The cut is pictured as a death of some sort, but leaving open to interpretation what part of the patient is dying.

In the first part, Paul is reluctant to administrate the cut to a willing patient, and in the course of his frustrations and failure to convince him otherwise, let explode his angst and impotency to commit suicide, confessing in particular his deficient relationship with his wife. In the second part, Paul is shown in the context that seems to put the most strain on him: his family life. We see him waiting for and having dinner with his wife, from whom he his holding secret—out of guilt—the real nature of his activities for the government. The two have a conversation that progresses from chit-chat to a maddening and humiliating confrontation. In the last part, Paul is in jail as a result of the cut being banished from a new Government, and is visited by his son, with whom he shares an equally emotionally disturbed and alienated conversation.
