= Dalliance (play) =

1986 play by Tom Stoppard

Dalliance is a play by Tom Stoppard, based on Arthur Schnitzler's play Liebelei. Dalliance was first performed at the Lyttelton Theatre, London, on 27 May 1986. It was directed by Peter Wood, with music by Andre Previn. It starred Stephen Moore, Brenda Blethyn, Sally Dexter and Tim Curry. Dexter won the Laurence Olivier Award for Best Newcomer in a Play for her performance.

== Plot summary ==
Fritz, who considers himself a man-about-town in 1890s Vienna, is despondent because a sophisticated, upper-class lady has ended their affair. Fritz's friend Theodore tries to cheer Fritz up by introducing him to Christine, a seamstress for the opera, believing that a dalliance with a charming lower-class woman can take a man's mind off his troubles. Almost immediately after beginning a relationship with Christine, Fritz receives a challenge from the sophisticated lady's husband. Fritz knows he has little chance of surviving the duel. In the few remaining days in his life, Fritz and Christine fall in love, and he recognises the superiority of a simple life of mutual love over the bon vivant life of an urban bachelor. Beyond the addition of Stoppardian wit in the adaptation, Stoppard's major change from the original is to shift the last scene from Christine's apartment to backstage at the opera. A comic opera with a similar plot is taking place on stage when Christine hears the news that Fritz has been killed in a duel.
