= Amanda Harris =

Greek-Australian poet

Amanda Harris (born 1963) is an English actress. She was born in Adelaide, South Australia and spent her childhood in Papua New Guinea before moving to Britain at the age of 10. She trained at Arts Ed. A longstanding member of the Royal Shakespeare Company, she received an Olivier Award for her role as Emilia in the 2004 RSC production of Othello.
