= Donkeys' Years =

Play written by Michael Frayn

- Original language: English
- Written by: Michael Frayn
- Subject: A group of men at their twentieth college reunion regress to their undergraduate behaviours
- Genre: Comedy / farce

Premiere
- Date: 1976
- Place: Globe Theatre now Gielgud Theatre, London

Donkeys' Years is a play by English playwright Michael Frayn that premiered at the Globe Theatre, London, in 1976.

== Genre ==
The play is a West End farce, a genre that Frayn parodied five years later in his play within a play "Nothing On" from Noises Off.

== Plot ==
In Donkeys' Years six former students spend the weekend at their old college for their 25th year reunion. The wife of the Master of the college becomes locked within its walls for the night, supplying the material for a classic bedroom farce. A Government minister is placed in a series of embarrassing positions.

== Awards ==
The play won the 1976 Laurence Olivier Award for Best Entertainment or Comedy Play.

The play featured Penelope Keith, who subsequently won the 1976 Olivier Award for Best Comedy Performance.

== 2006 revival ==
The play was revived in 2006 at the Comedy Theatre.
