= Paul Pyant =

British lighting designer (born 1953)

Paul Pyant (born 22 July 1953) is a British lighting designer, whose designs have been featured in the West End, on Broadway and in opera houses around the world. He has been nominated for several Olivier Awards and Tony Awards, winning the Olivier in 2014 for his design for Charlie and the Chocolate Factory.

== Life and career ==
Pyant's parents are Leonard Vincent Pyant, a business executive, and Jean Phoebe née Frampton, a medical secretary. He graduated from the Royal Academy of Dramatic Art in London in 1973 and is an associate of the academy.

=== Musical theatre ===
His credits in Britain include numerous West End productions and many productions with Royal National Theatre (RNT) in London. He was nominated for Olivier Awards for his designs for The Wind in the Willows (RNT 1991), Hamlet (2001), A Streetcar Named Desire (2003), All's Well that Ends Well (2005) and the musicals The Lord of the Rings (2008) and Charlie and the Chocolate Factory (2014). He won the Olivier for the last of these. The RNT production of Othello played an engagement in Brooklyn, New York in 1998. Ben Brantley, in The New York Times, wrote that Pyant's lighting for this production was "exquisite". Pyant's lighting design for the 2010 West End production of Waiting for Godot was called "lyrical".

He has also designed lighting for productions of the Donmar Warehouse in London since its opening. For the Royal Shakespeare Company, he has lit productions of Richard III, The Tempest, The Painter of Dishonour and Julius Caesar. As one of the creative members of the Sam Mendes "Bridge Project", he designed the lighting for As You Like It and The Tempest, which played in repertory at the Brooklyn Academy of Music (BAM) and The Old Vic in 2010. Pyant commented on working on the two productions: "You know going into the project that these are two very different productions to light." For the Chichester Festival Theatre, he designed the lighting for productions in 2005, 2007 and 2008, including The Scarlet Letter and King Lear.

His designs have been seen on Broadway in Orpheus Descending (1989), Arcadia (1993), Carousel (1994), Electra (1998), Primo (2005) and The Woman in White (2005). He was nominated for the Tony Award, Best Lighting Design, for Orpheus Descending and Arcadia, and received nominations for Drama Desk Awards for lighting for Carousel and the Sam Mendes "Bridge Project" production of The Winter's Tale (2009).

=== Opera and ballet ===
Pyant's extensive opera credits include lighting designs for the premiere of The Minotaur (1990). From 1974 to 1987 he worked with Glyndebourne Opera, where he later designed lighting for Sir Peter Hall's productions of Le Nozze di Figaro, Falstaff and New Year, as well as Stephen Lawless's production of Death in Venice, among others. Since 1985, he has designed productions for the English National Opera (ENO). Early designs for ENO included Lady Macbeth of Mtsensk in 1987, Handel's Xerxes and Carmen in 1988, Lear, Falstaff and Street Scene the next year. Later, he designed for them Orfeo ed Euridice (2001) and others. His designs have also been seen at the Metropolitan Opera in New York, at the Vienna Staatsoper, the Vienna Volksoper, the Royal Opera House in London, La Scala, Milan; Opera de Monte Carlo, the Kirov Opera in St. Petersburg and elsewhere. He has designed ten productions for the Houston Grand Opera, including Rigoletto and most recently Handel's Xerxes in 2010.

His designs for ballet include productions by the English National Ballet, Northern Ballet, The Norwegian National Ballet, The Royal New Zealand Ballet, Boston Ballet and Atlanta Ballet. He designed the lighting for The Snow Queen for the English National Ballet in 2010, with The Stage reviewer Gavin Roebuck noting "Paul Pyant magically lights these and the dazzling ice scape."
