= Audience Award for Most Popular Show =

Retired award for London theatre

Laurence Olivier Award for Most Popular Show
- Awarded for: Most Popular Show
- Location: England
- Presented by: Society of London Theatre
- First award: 2002
- Final award: 2016
- Website: officiallondontheatre.com/olivier-awards/

The Laurence Olivier Award for Most Popular Show was an annual award presented by the Society of London Theatre in recognition of the "world-class status of London theatre." The awards were established as the Society of West End Theatre Awards in 1976, and renamed in 1984 in honour of English actor and director Laurence Olivier.

This award, which is determined solely by a fan-vote, was introduced in 2002, was not presented for 2003–2009, then was presented from 2010 through 2016, after which it was discontinued.

On the eight occasions that fans submitted votes on this award, it consistently went to a musical production, including twice each for The Phantom of the Opera, Wicked and Les Misérables.

== Winners and nominees ==
=== 2000s ===
Year	Production
2002
2002	The Phantom of the Opera
2002	Cats
2002	Mamma Mia!
2002	Reduced Shakespeare Company

=== 2010s ===
Year	Production
2010
2010	Wicked
2010	Billy Elliot
2010	The Phantom of the Opera
2010	War Horse
2010	We Will Rock You
2011
2011	We Will Rock You
2011	Billy Elliot
2011	Jersey Boys
2011	Les Misérables
2012
2012	Les Misérables
2012	Billy Elliot
2012	Jersey Boys
2012	Wicked
2013
2013	Billy Elliot
2013	Matilda
2013	The Phantom of the Opera
2013	Wicked
2014
2014	Les Misérables
2014	Matilda
2014	The Phantom of the Opera
2014	Wicked
2015
2015	Wicked
2015	Billy Elliot
2015	Jersey Boys
2015	Matilda
2016
2016	The Phantom of the Opera
2016	Jersey Boys
2016	Les Misérables
2016	Matilda
