= 2002 Laurence Olivier Awards =

Edition of London theatre awards

- Date: 15 February 2002
- Location: Victoria Palace Theatre, London
- Hosted by: Clive Anderson
- Most wins: My Fair Lady (3); Private Lives (3)
- Most nominations: Kiss Me, Kate (9)

The 2002 Laurence Olivier Awards were presented by the Society of London Theatre on 15 February 2002 at the Victoria Palace Theatre in London, celebrating excellence in West End theatre. The ceremony was hosted by comedy writer and television presenter Clive Anderson.

== Winners and nominees ==
Details of winners (in bold) and nominees, in each award category, per the Society of London Theatre.

Best New Play	Outstanding Musical Production
**Jitney by August Wilson – National Theatre Lyttelton**; Boy Gets Girl by Rebecca Gilman – Royal Court; Gagarin Way by Gregory Burke – National Theatre Cottesloe; Humble Boy by Charlotte Jones – National Theatre Cottesloe / Gielgud; Mouth to Mouth by Kevin Elyot – Royal Court / Albery	**My Fair Lady – Theatre Royal Drury Lane**; Kiss Me, Kate – Victoria Palace; South Pacific – National Theatre Olivier
Best New Comedy	Best Entertainment
**The Play What I Wrote by Eddie Braben, Sean Foley and Hamish McColl – Wyndham's**; Boston Marriage by David Mamet – Donmar Warehouse / New Ambassadors; Caught in the Net by Ray Cooney – Vaudeville; Feelgood by Alistair Beaton – Garrick	**Shockheaded Peter – Piccadilly / Albery**; Barbara Cook Sings Mostly Sondheim – Lyric; The League of Gentlemen – Theatre Royal, Drury Lane; The Pub Landlord: My Gaff, My Rules – Playhouse; The Vagina Monologues – New Ambassadors / Arts
Best Actor	Best Actress
**Roger Allam as Terri Dennis in Privates on Parade – Donmar Warehouse**; Simon Russell Beale as Felix Humble in Humble Boy – National Theatre Cottesloe / Gielgud; Sean Foley and Hamish McColl as Sean and Hamish in The Play What I Wrote – Wyndham's; Alan Rickman as Elyot Chase in Private Lives – Albery	**Lindsay Duncan as Amanda Prynne in Private Lives – Albery**; Lindsay Duncan as Laura in Mouth to Mouth – Royal Court / Albery; Victoria Hamilton as Sheila in A Day in the Death of Joe Egg – New Ambassadors / Comedy; Zoë Wanamaker as Anna in Boston Marriage – Donmar Warehouse / New Ambassadors
Best Actor in a Musical or Entertainment	Best Actress in a Musical or Entertainment
**Philip Quast as Emile de Becque in South Pacific – National Theatre Olivier**; Brent Barrett as Fred Graham/Petruchio in Kiss Me, Kate – Victoria Palace; Paul Keating as Straight Dave in Closer to Heaven – Arts; Jonathan Pryce as Henry Higgins in My Fair Lady – Theatre Royal Drury Lane	**Martine McCutcheon as Eliza Doolittle in My Fair Lady – Theatre Royal Drury Lane**; Barbara Cook as Herself in Barbara Cook Sings Mostly Sondheim – Lyric; Ruthie Henshall as Peggy Sue in Peggy Sue Got Married – Shaftesbury; Marin Mazzie as Lilli Vanessi/Kate Minola in Kiss Me, Kate – Victoria Palace
Best Actor in a Supporting Role	Best Actress in a Supporting Role
**Toby Jones as Arthur in The Play What I Wrote – Wyndham's**; Desmond Barrit as Sir John Falstaff in Henry IV – Barbican; Ned Beatty as Big Daddy Pollitt in Cat on a Hot Tin Roof – Lyric; Adam Godley as Gompertz in Mouth to Mouth – Royal Court / Albery; Malcolm Sinclair as Major Giles Flack in Privates on Parade – Donmar Warehouse	**Marcia Warren as Mercy Lott in Humble Boy – National Theatre Cottesloe / Gielgud**; Bríd Brennan as Birdie Hubbard in The Little Foxes – Donmar Warehouse; Emma Fielding as Sibyl in Private Lives – Albery; Lyndsey Marshal as Catherine in Boston Marriage – Donmar Warehouse / New Ambassadors
Best Supporting Performance in a Musical or Entertainment
**Martyn Jacques as Performer in Shockheaded Peter – Piccadilly / Albery**; Nancy Anderson as Lois Lane/Bianca Minola in Kiss Me, Kate – Victoria Palace; Michael Berresse Bill Calhoun Lucentio in Kiss Me, Kate – Victoria Palace; Nicholas Le Prevost as Colonel Hugh Pickering in My Fair Lady – Theatre Royal Drury Lane
Best Director	Best Theatre Choreographer
**Michael Boyd for Henry IV and Richard III – Young Vic**; Michael Blakemore for Kiss Me, Kate – Victoria Palace; Howard Davies for Private Lives – Albery; Julian Crouch and Phelim McDermott for Shockheaded Peter – Piccadilly / Albery; Ian Rickson for Mouth to Mouth – Royal Court / Albery	**Matthew Bourne for My Fair Lady – Theatre Royal Drury Lane**; Irving Davies for The Play What I Wrote – Wyndham's; Scarlett Mackmin for Privates on Parade – Donmar Warehouse; Kathleen Marshall for Kiss Me, Kate – Victoria Palace
Most Promising Playwright	Most Promising Performer
Grae Cleugh **for Fucking Games – Royal Court**; Abi Morgan for Tender – Hampstead; Simon Stephens for Herons – Royal Court	**Benjamin Davies as Danny in Fucking Games – Royal Court**; Jack Davenport as Tony in The Servant – Lyric Hammersmith; Ralf Little as George Harrison in Presence – Royal Court; Leah Muller as The Stepdaughter in Six Characters In Search of an Author – Young Vic
Best Set Designer	Best Costume Designer
**Tim Hatley for Humble Boy – National Theatre Cottesloe and Private Lives – Albery**; Lez Brotherston for A Midsummer Night's Dream – Albery and The Little Foxes – Donmar Warehouse; Julian Crouch and Graeme Gilmour for Shockheaded Peter – Piccadilly / Albery; Robin Wagner for Kiss Me, Kate – Victoria Palace; Anthony Ward for My Fair Lady – Theatre Royal Drury Lane	**Jenny Beavan for Private Lives – Albery**; Martin Pakledinaz for Kiss Me, Kate – Victoria Palace; Kevin Pollard for Shockheaded Peter – Piccadilly / Albery; Anthony Ward for My Fair Lady – Theatre Royal Drury Lane
Best Lighting Designer
**Mark Henderson for A Midsummer Night's Dream – Albery and The Playboy of the Western World – National Theatre Cottesloe**; Howard Harrison for Cat on a Hot Tin Roof – Lyric and Tales from Hollywood – Donmar Warehouse; David Hersey for My Fair Lady – Theatre Royal Drury Lane and South Pacific – National Theatre Olivier; Tim Mitchell for Henry IV – Barbican; Peter Mumford for Hamlet – Barbican and Private Lives – Albery
Outstanding Achievement in Dance	Best New Dance Production
**Mark Morris Dance Group for their season – Sadler's Wells**; Ushio Amagatsu for choreographing, conceiving, directing and performing Hibiki, Sankai Juku – Sadler's Wells; Dana Caspersen in Artifact and Eidos/Telos, Ballett Frankfurt – Sadler's Wells; William Forsythe in Artifact and Eidos/Telos, Ballett Frankfurt – Sadler's Wells	**Hibiki, Sankai Juku – Sadler's Wells**; Eidos/Telos, Ballett Frankfurt – Sadler's Wells; Live, Dutch National Ballet – Sadler's Wells; Onegin, The Royal Ballet – Royal Opera House
Outstanding Achievement in Opera	Outstanding New Opera Production
**Bernard Haitink for Jenůfa and The Queen of Spades, The Royal Opera – Royal Opera House**; From Morning to Midnight, The Rake's Progress, The Rape of Lucretia and War and Peace, English National Opera – London Coliseum; Karita Mattila in Jenůfa and The Queen of Spades, The Royal Opera – Royal Opera House; David Sawer for From Morning to Midnight, English National Opera – London Coliseum	**Boulevard Solitude, The Royal Opera – Royal Opera House**; Jenůfa, The Royal Opera – Royal Opera House; The Rape of Lucretia, English National Opera – London Coliseum; Rigoletto, The Royal Opera – Royal Opera House
Outstanding Achievement Award	Audience Award for Most Popular Show
**Trevor Nunn**	**The Phantom of the Opera – Her Majesty's**; All the Great Books (Abridged), Reduced Shakespeare Company – Criterion Theatre; Cats – New London; Mamma Mia – Prince Edward
Society Special Award
**Rupert Rhymes**

== Productions with multiple nominations and awards ==
The following 23 productions, including three ballets and two operas, received multiple nominations:

- 9: Kiss Me, Kate
- 8: My Fair Lady
- 7: Private Lives
- 5: Shockheaded Peter
- 4: Humble Boy, Mouth to Mouth and The Play What I Wrote
- 3: Boston Marriage, Eidos/Telos, Henry IV, Jenůfa, Privates on Parade and South Pacific
- 2: A Midsummer Night's Dream, Artifact, Barbara Cook Sings Mostly Sondheim, Cat on a Hot Tin Roof, From Morning to Midnight, Fucking Games, Hibiki, The Little Foxes, The Queen of Spades and The Rape of Lucretia

The following six productions received multiple awards:

- 3: My Fair Lady and Private Lives
- 2: Fucking Games, Humble Boy, Shockheaded Peter and The Play What I Wrote

== See also ==
- 56th Tony Awards
