= 2003 Laurence Olivier Awards =

Edition of London theatre awards

- Date: 14 February 2003
- Location: Lyceum Theatre, London
- Most wins: Twelfth Night (3); Uncle Vanya (3)
- Most nominations: Play Without Words (5); Twelfth Night (5)

Television/radio coverage
- Network: BBC Two (broadcast on 15 February)

The 2003 Laurence Olivier Awards, celebrating excellence in West End theatre, were presented by the Society of London Theatre on Friday 14 February 2003, at the Lyceum Theatre, London. A recording of the ceremony was broadcast the next night on BBC Two.

== Winners and nominees ==
Details of winners (in bold) and nominees, in each award category, per the Society of London Theatre.

Best New Play	Best New Musical
**Vincent in Brixton by Nicholas Wright – National Theatre Cottesloe / Wyndham's**; Jesus Hopped the 'A' Train by Stephen Adly Guirgis – Donmar Warehouse; The Coast of Utopia by Tom Stoppard – National Theatre Olivier; The York Realist by Peter Gill – Royal Court / Strand	**Our House – Cambridge**; Bombay Dreams – Apollo Victoria; Chitty Chitty Bang Bang – London Palladium; Taboo – Venue
Best Revival	Outstanding Musical Production
**Twelfth Night by William Shakespeare and Uncle Vanya – Donmar Warehouse**; A Streetcar Named Desire – National Theatre Lyttelton; Abigail's Party – New Ambassadors	**Anything Goes – National Theatre Olivier**; Oh, What a Lovely War – Regent's Park Open Air
Best New Comedy	Best Entertainment
**The Lieutenant of Inishmore by Martin McDonagh – Barbican Pit / Garrick**; Dinner by Moira Buffini – Loft; RolePlay by Alan Ayckbourn – Duchess; Lobby Hero by Kenneth Lonergan – Donmar Warehouse / New Ambassadors	**Play Without Words – National Theatre Lyttelton**; Contact – Queen's; Elaine Stritch at Liberty – Old Vic; Rory Bremner with John Bird and John Fortune – Albery
Best Actor	Best Actress
**Simon Russell Beale as Vanya Petrovich Voynitsky in Uncle Vanya – Donmar Warehouse**; Michael Gambon as Salter in A Number – Royal Court; Mark Rylance as Olivia in Twelfth Night – Globe; David Tennant as Jeff in Lobby Hero – Donmar Warehouse / New Ambassadors	**Clare Higgins as Ursula Loyer in Vincent in Brixton – National Theatre Cottesloe / Wyndham's**; Anita Dobson as Nancy in Frozen – National Theatre Cottesloe; Gwyneth Paltrow as Catherine in Proof – Donmar Warehouse; Emily Watson as Sonya Alexandrovna Serebryakova in Uncle Vanya – Donmar Warehouse
Best Actor in a Musical or Entertainment	Best Actress in a Musical or Entertainment
**Alex Jennings as Henry Higgins in My Fair Lady – Theatre Royal Drury Lane**; Tim Flavin as Captain Billy Buck Chandler in My One and Only – Piccadilly; Michael Jibson as Joe Casey in Our House – Cambridge; Euan Morton as George O'Dowd in Taboo – Venue	**Joanna Riding as Eliza Doolittle in My Fair Lady – Theatre Royal Drury Lane**; Janie Dee as Edith Herbert in My One and Only – Piccadilly; Elaine Stritch as Herself in Elaine Stritch at Liberty – Old Vic; Sarah Wildor as Wife in Contact – Queen's
Best Performance in a Supporting Role	Best Performance in a Supporting Role in a Musical or Entertainment
**Essie Davis as Stella Kowalski in A Streetcar Named Desire – National Theatre Lyttelton**; Jessica Hynes as Bolla in The Night Heron – Royal Court; Mark Strong as Orsino in Twelfth Night – Donmar Warehouse; Sian Thomas as Dawn Grey in Up for Grabs – Wyndham's	**Paul Baker as Philip Sallon in Taboo – Venue**; Sharon D. Clarke as Killer Queen in We Will Rock You – Dominion; Jenny Galloway as Mickey in My One and Only – Piccadilly; Nichola McAuliffe as Baroness Bomburst in Chitty Chitty Bang Bang – London Palladium; Craig Urbani as Performer in Contact – Queen's
Best Director	Best Theatre Choreographer
**Sam Mendes for Twelfth Night and Uncle Vanya – Donmar Warehouse**; Matthew Bourne for Play Without Words – National Theatre Lyttelton; Richard Eyre for Vincent in Brixton – National Theatre Cottesloe; Edward Hall for Rose Rage – Theatre Royal Haymarket	**Matthew Bourne for Play Without Words – National Theatre Lyttelton**; Peter Darling for Our House – Cambridge; Craig Revel Horwood for My One and Only – Piccadilly; Susan Stroman for Contact – Queen's
Most Promising Playwright	Most Promising Performer
**Charlotte Eilenberg for The Lucky Ones – Hampstead**; Christopher Shinn for Where Do We Live – Royal Court	**Noel Clarke as Shed for Where Do We Live – Royal Court**; Toby Dantzic as Ron for Where Do We Live – Royal Court; Sam Heughan as John for Outlying Islands – Royal Court; Sid Mitchell as Soren for The Dead Eye Boy – Hampstead
Best Set Design	Best Costume Design
**Bunny Christie for A Streetcar Named Desire – National Theatre Lyttelton**; Lez Brotherston for Play Without Words – National Theatre Lyttelton; William Dudley for The Coast of Utopia – National Theatre Olivier; Anthony Ward for Chitty Chitty Bang Bang – London Palladium	**Jenny Tiramani for Twelfth Night – Globe**; William Dudley for The Coast of Utopia – National Theatre Olivier; Mike Nicholls for Taboo – Venue; Mark Thompson for Bombay Dreams – Apollo Victoria
Best Lighting Design
**Peter Mumford for The Bacchae – National Theatre Olivier**; Paule Constable for Play Without Words – National Theatre Lyttelton; David Hersey for The Coast of Utopia – National Theatre Olivier; Paul Pyant for A Streetcar Named Desire – National Theatre Lyttelton
Outstanding Achievement in Dance	Best New Dance Production
**Robyn Orlin for choreographing Daddy, I've Seen This Piece Six Times and I Still Don't Know Why They're Hurting Each Other – Barbican Pit**; Chiaki Nagao in Madame Butterfly, Northern Ballet Theatre – Sadler's Wells; Christopher Wheeldon for choreographing Polyphonia – Sadler's Wells and Tryst – Royal Opera House; Tanztheater Wuppertal for Kontakthof – Barbican	**Polyphonia, Danses Concertantes – Sadler's Wells**; Rain, Rosas – Sadler's Wells; Rome and Jewels, Rennie Harris Puremovement – Peacock; Tryst, The Royal Ballet – Royal Opera House
Outstanding Achievement in Opera	Outstanding New Opera Production
**Antonio Pappano for music directing Ariadne auf Naxos and Wozzeck – Royal Opera House**; Roberto Alagna and Angela Gheorghiu in La rondine, The Royal Opera – Royal Opera House; Lisa Saffer in Lulu, English National Opera – London Coliseum	**Wozzeck, The Royal Opera – Royal Opera House**; Ariadne auf Naxos, The Royal Opera – Royal Opera House; Bluebeard's Castle and Erwartung, The Royal Opera – Royal Opera House; Lulu, English National Opera – London Coliseum
Outstanding Achievement Award
**Gregory Doran and his ensemble for the season – Gielgud**
Society Special Award
**Sam Mendes for 10 years as Artistic Director – Donmar Warehouse**

== Productions with multiple nominations and awards ==
The following 21 productions, including one ballet and three operas, received multiple nominations:

- 5: Play Without Words and Twelfth Night
- 4: A Streetcar Named Desire, Contact, My One and Only, Taboo, The Coast of Utopia and Uncle Vanya
- 3: Chitty Chitty Bang Bang, Our House, Vincent in Brixton and Where Do We Live
- 2: Ariadne auf Naxos, Bombay Dreams, Elaine Stritch at Liberty, Lobby Hero, Lulu, My Fair Lady, Polyphonia, Tryst and Wozzeck

The following seven productions received multiple awards:

- 3: Twelfth Night and Uncle Vanya
- 2: A Streetcar Named Desire, My Fair Lady, Play Without Words, Vincent in Brixton and Wozzeck

== See also ==
- 57th Tony Awards
