= Sam Heughan =

Scottish actor (born 1980)

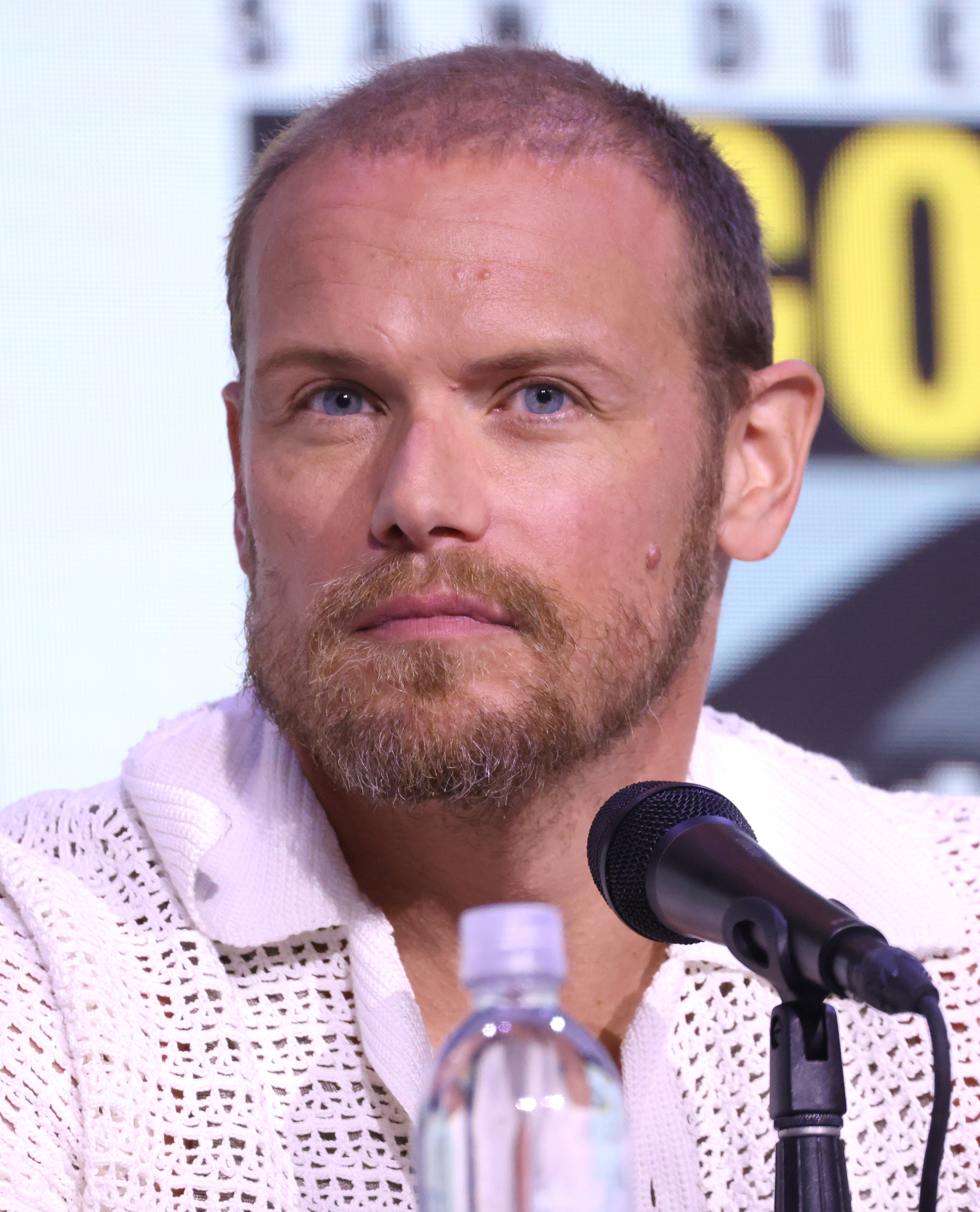
- Heughan in 2025
- Born: Sam Roland Heughan; 30 April 1980 (age 46); Balmaclellan, Scotland
- Education: Royal Scottish Academy of Music and Drama
- Occupation: Actor
- Years active: 2001–present

Sam Roland Heughan (/ˈhjuːən/; born 30 April 1980) is a Scottish actor. He is best known for his starring role as Jamie Fraser in the Starz drama series Outlander (2014–2026) for which he has won the People's Choice Award for Favorite Cable Sci-Fi/Fantasy TV Actor and the Saturn Award for Best Actor on Television, and received a nomination for the Critics' Choice Television Award for Best Actor in a Drama Series.

Heughan has also starred in films such as the spy comedy The Spy Who Dumped Me (2018) and the superhero action film Bloodshot (2020). He was nominated for the Laurence Olivier Award for Most Promising Performer for his performance in Outlying Islands performed at the Royal Court Theatre Upstairs.

Heughan and his Outlander co-star Graham McTavish co-wrote Clanlands: Whisky, Warfare, and a Scottish Adventure Like No Other which reached number one on the New York Times' Best Seller List for hardcover nonfiction, and combined print and e-book nonfiction in November 2020. The same year Heughan launched his own whisky brand, The Sassenach (named after his Outlander character's nickname for his wife, Claire), winning consecutive double golds in the 2020 and 2021 San Francisco World Spirits Competition.

== Early life and education ==
Sam Roland Heughan was born on 30 April 1980 in Balmaclellan, Kirkcudbrightshire. His parents had been part of a hippie community in London called Gandalf's Garden, which was strongly influenced by the works of J. R. R. Tolkien and led them to name Heughan and his older brother after characters from The Lord of the Rings. His mother, Chrissie Heughan, an artist and artisan papermaker, raised the two boys after their father left when they were young.

Aged five, Heughan moved from Balmaclellan to nearby New Galloway and attended Kells Primary School. With only a small number of pupils in his class, he spent much of his time playing alone in the surrounding woodland and on the grounds of the local castle, experiences he has said contributed to his imagination and later interest in acting. During this period, the family lived in converted stables on the grounds of Kenmure Castle. He moved to Edinburgh at 12, attending James Gillespie's High School for a year before transferring to the Edinburgh Rudolf Steiner School, where he remained until completing sixth year. He joined the Lyceum Youth Theatre in 1998 and, in 1999, gained a place at the Royal Scottish Academy of Music and Drama (RSAMD; now the Royal Conservatoire of Scotland) in Glasgow, graduating in 2003.

While studying at RSAMD, Heughan appeared in a range of stage productions, including The Twits at Citizens Theatre, an adaptation of Fyodor Dostoevsky's Crime and Punishment, Anton Chekhov's The Seagull, Aeschylus's Greek tragedy Prometheus Bound, and Shakespeare's Romeo and Juliet. In 2002, shortly before completing his degree, he was selected as one of four students to represent the academy in the BBC Carleton Hobbs radio talent competition. The Royal Conservatoire of Scotland later awarded him an honorary doctorate at its 2022 graduation ceremony.

== Career ==
While still a student at RSAMD Heughan took extended leave of his studies to focus on Outlying Islands, a play by Scottish playwright David Greig. The play premiered at the Traverse Theatre in Edinburgh before moving to the Royal Court Theatre in London. Heughan was nominated for a Laurence Olivier Award for Most Promising Performer for his performance.

In 2004, Heughan appeared in his first professional television role in the miniseries Island at War, a WWII drama about the German occupation of the Channel Islands. The following year he appeared in several episodes of the Scottish soap opera River City as footballer Andrew Murray. He later portrayed adulterous husband Pony William in David Harrower's play Knives in Hens at the Tron Theatre in Glasgow. Between 2006 and 2009 Heughan appeared in a number of made-for-television films and miniseries including BBC and PBS's collaborative miniseries The Wild West (2006), Channel 4's docudrama, A Very British Sex Scandal (2007), and BBC Four's Breaking the Mould (2009). During that time he also made appearances in a number of television series, including an episode of ITV's Midsomer Murders, ITV's crime drama Rebus, and two episodes of BBC's political drama Party Animals. Between 2007 and 2009 Heughan made appearances in several live productions, including Noël Coward's The Vortex at the Royal Exchange Theatre, Shakespeare's Hamlet at the Citizens Theatre, Iain F. MacLeod's The Pearlfishers at the Traverse Theatre, Shakespeare's Romeo and Juliet at the Dundee Repertory Theatre, Macbeth at the Royal Lyceum Theatre, and Nicholas de Jongh's Plague Over England at the Duchess Theatre.

In 2009, Heughan landed a recurring role as Scott Nielson, Nurse Cherry Malone's boyfriend and a secret drug dealer in the BBC soap opera Doctors. He was nominated for a British Soap Award, in the category Villain of the Year, for his twenty-one episode stint on the series. The following year, Heughan starred as the title character in the direct-to-video feature Young Alexander the Great, which was filmed in Egypt and explored the life of the teenager who would become Alexander the Great. He went on to star in BBC's television film First Light, the story of RAF pilot Geoffrey Wellum's experiences flying a Spitfire in the Battle of Britain, as documented in his WWII memoir of the same name. From there he featured in PBS's BAFTA-winning mini-series Any Human Heart, the story of author Logan Mountstuart's life in the context of historical events surrounding him, based upon William Boyd's novel of the same name. Heughan returned to theatre later that year in dramatist Phyllis Nagy's adaptation of Patricia Highsmith's novel The Talented Mr. Ripley at the Royal & Derngate. Throughout that same year, Heughan portrayed Hugh Tennent, founder of Tennent's Lager, in a series of comical commercials, which won a number of accolades at the Scottish Advertising Awards.

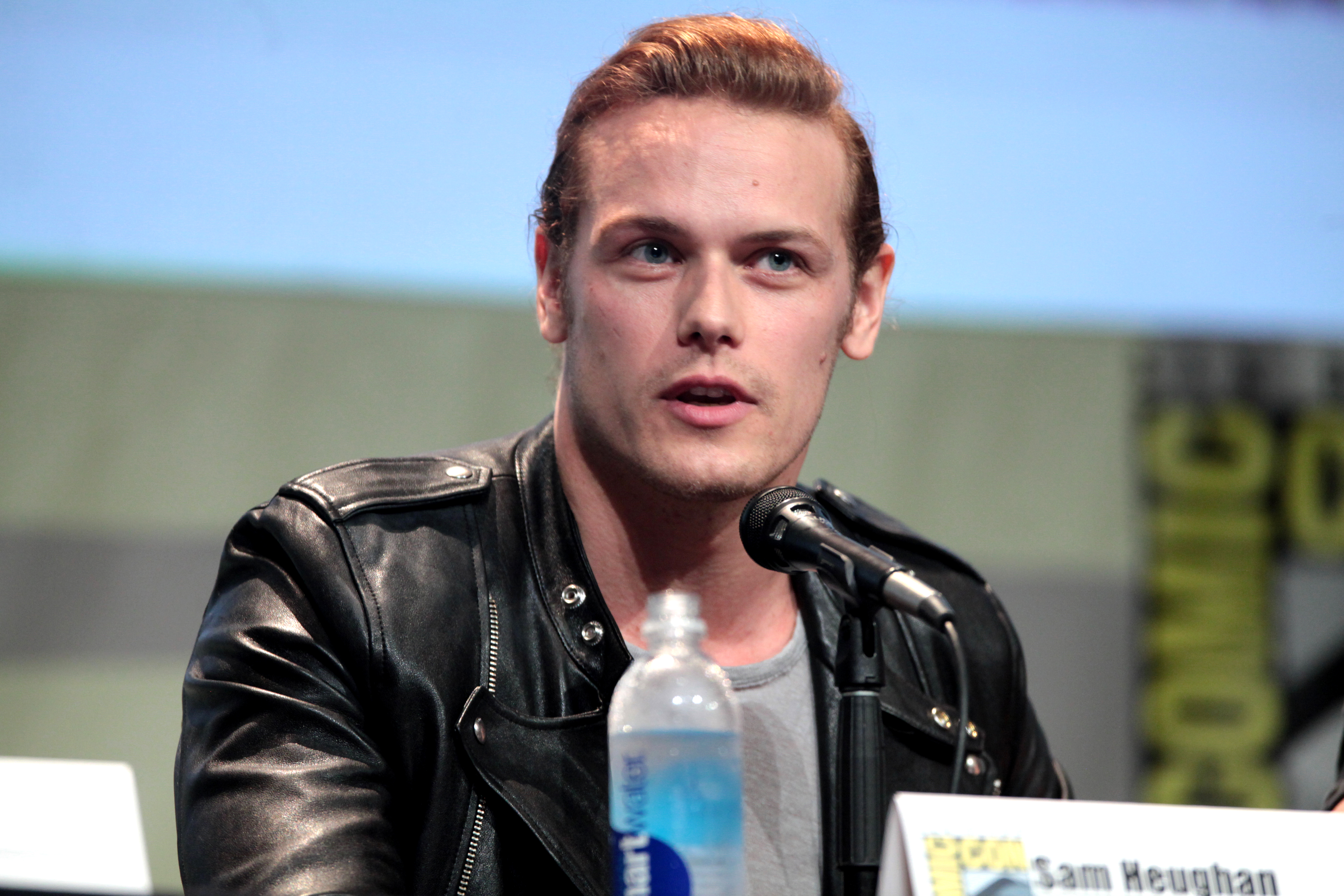
Heughan at the 2015 San Diego Comic-Con promoting Outlander

Hallmark Channel's original film A Princess for Christmas starred Heughan as Prince Ashton in 2011, a role which saw him appear opposite Roger Moore and secure a nomination for Most Inspiring Performance in Television at the 20th Annual Grace Awards. That same year, he featured in Steve Waters' sold-out play Amphibians, a dual story of Olympic swimmers Max and Elsa, at the Bridewell Theatre. For the next two years he starred as Batman in the touring stage show Batman Live. During this time he made the news for his assistance in a real-life citizen's arrest. In 2012, he performed the title role in Shakespeare's King John at the Òran Mór Theatre.

In 2013, Heughan was cast as Jamie Fraser in the Starz time-travel drama series Outlander. He was the first cast member officially announced, to great praise by the author of the series, Diana Gabaldon, who said, "That man is a Scot to the bone and Jamie Fraser to the heart. Having seen Sam Heughan not just act, but be Jamie, I feel immensely grateful to the production team for their painstaking attention to the soul of the story and characters." He's played the co-lead role for all seven seasons of the series, and will continue for the eighth and last season, scheduled to film in 2024. He and his co-star, Caitriona Balfe, assumed the additional role of producers on the series in 2019.

Turning to independent films in 2014, Heughan appeared in the psychological thriller Emulsion, the story of a man haunted by the disappearance of his wife. He also starred in the comedy Heart of Lightness, in which Heughan appeared with two of his future Outlander co-stars: Laura Donnelly, who plays Jamie's sister Jenny Murray, and Rosie Day, who played Mary Hawkins in the second season. He went on to play the lead role of Jacob in the 2016 independent film When the Starlight Ends, which premiered at the Other Venice Film Festival.

In 2018, Heughan co-starred as MI6 agent Sebastian Henshaw in the action comedy film The Spy Who Dumped Me, opposite Mila Kunis and Kate McKinnon, which he filmed during an Outlander filming hiatus. That same year, in his first voice-acting project, Heughan appeared in the Warner Bros. Interactive Entertainment video game Lego DC Super-Villains as the Mirror Master. In May of that year, Heughan was a guest on BBC Two Scotland's special The Adventure Show, alongside Cameron McNeish, in an episode titled "Take A Hike" that focused on Scotland's passion for walking. It was also announced that Heughan would portray Corporal Jimmy Dalton in Bloodshot, an adaptation of the best-selling comic book from the Valiant universe, opposite Vin Diesel and Michael Sheen. Bloodshot premiered in March 2020.

In November 2018, Heughan was cast as Tom Buckingham, the lead role in SAS: Red Notice, a film based on the novel of the same name by Andy McNab. The film premiered in United Kingdom on March 12, 2021, via Sky Cinema. Rotten Tomatoes described the film as a "thoroughly mediocre action thriller."

In 2019, it was announced that Heughan would play Paul Newman in To Olivia, a biopic about Patricia Neal and Roald Dahl starring Keeley Hawes and Hugh Bonneville. To Olivia premiered on February 19, 2021, in the United Kingdom, via Sky Cinema. In 2020, Heughan was cast as Henry in the Regency-era romantic comedy Mr. Malcom's List, based on a book of the same name by Suzanne Allain.

He starred alongside Priyanka Chopra and Celine Dion in the romantic comedy drama film Love Again. The film is an English-language remake of the 2016 German film SMS für Dich, itself based on the 2009 novel of the same name by Sofie Cramer. It was released theatrically on May 12, 2023, by Sony Pictures Releasing.

In October to December 2025, Heughan played the title role in the Royal Shakespeare Company's production of Macbeth at The Other Place, Stratford-upon-Avon, opposite Lia Williams as Lady Macbeth.

=== Other work ===
In addition to acting, Heughan served as the first Global Brand Ambassador for the English clothing label Barbour beginning in 2016. He released several collections since his initial autumn/winter line in 2017, all of which he co-designed.

In November 2020, Heughan published a travelogue titled Clanlands: Whisky, Warfare, and a Scottish Adventure Like No Other with Outlander co-star Graham McTavish. The book became a bestseller, reaching No. 1 on the New York Times' Best Seller Lists for hardcover nonfiction and for combined print and e-book nonfiction and #1 on the Publishers Weekly Bestseller List for hardcover nonfiction, among other lists. Clanlands serves as a companion to Men in Kilts: A Roadtrip With Sam and Graham, an eight-part television series conceived by and starring Heughan and McTavish that premiered on the Starz channel in February 2021.

Also in 2020, Heughan launched his own whisky brand, The Sassenach, through the Great Glen Company, which he founded. The Sassenach is available in the UK and select US states and earned a double gold medal at the 2020 San Francisco World Spirits Competition.

== Political views and philanthropy ==
Heughan is fairly open about his political views. In response to a fan suggesting actors should stay out of politics in 2017, he replied "Sorry I disagree. EVERYONE is entitled to an opinion. That's what makes it a democracy." Heughan was a vocal supporter of Scottish independence from the United Kingdom during the 2014 independence referendum, going on record as saying, "I was a no and thought independence wasn't a good idea initially, but then I did a 180 and towards the end became quite vocal in the Yes campaign. I thought that ultimately it was a move towards more democracy for the people of Scotland." In 2021, he insisted his support for independence was not "anti-British" but rather out of a love for and belief in Scotland; he called it a "great opportunity".

Heughan credits much of his early success to his participation in youth theatre and, in August 2014, became a patron for Youth Theatre Arts Scotland. Of his position as patron, he has said, "I think that what I'd like to instill is that if you join the youth theatre, it's a gateway into greater career prospects." He supports the charitable organisation's mission 'to transform lives through youth theatre by providing inspiring participatory opportunities for young people in Scotland.'

In 2015, Heughan started the organisation My Peak Challenge, a training, nutrition, and support programme that provides participants with a sense of community as they work towards personal goals, while concurrently raising money for charity. The foundation has partnered with Leukemia Lymphoma Research, Bear Strength Clothing and Fight Camp Glasgow to raise funds for cancer research. In 2019, Heughan teamed up with Omaze, raffling off a date to the 2019 MPC Gala, which raised $2,892,080 for Bloodwise UK.

In September 2016, Heughan partook in the Great North Run to raise funds for Bloodwise, which he has supported since 2011, and became president of Scotland Bloodwise. In 2018, he ran both the Stirling and EMF Edinburgh Marathons in the space of a month to raise money for Cahonas Scotland and their Testicular Cancer Education and Awareness Programme. He raised £38,224 for the charity.

In light of the Gaza war, Heughan was one of over two thousand to sign an Artists for Palestine letter calling for a ceasefire and accusing Western governments of "not only tolerating war crimes but aiding and abetting them". He later apologised for signing this letter in a statement on X and withdrew his support, stating "I believed it was a simple call for peace – it wasn't."

== Personal life ==
Heughan is in a relationship with Canadian model Stephanie Bullock.

== Filmography ==
=== Film ===
Year	Title	Role	Notes
2001	Small Moments	Boyfriend	Short film
2011	A Princess for Christmas	Ashton Prince of Castlebury	Hallmark TV film
2014	Heart of Lightness	Lyngstrand	
2014	Emulsion	Ronny Maze	
2016	When the Starlight Ends	Jacob	
2018	The Spy Who Dumped Me	Sebastian Henshaw	
2020	Bloodshot	Jimmy Dalton	
2021	To Olivia	Paul Newman	
2021	SAS: Red Notice	Tom Buckingham	
2023	Born to be Great: Alexander of Macedonia	Alexander	Filmed in 2004
2023	Love Again	Rob Burns	

=== Television ===
Year	Title	Character	Notes
2004	Island at War	Philip Dorr	5 episodes
2005	River City	Andrew Murray	4 episodes
2006	The Wild West	John Tunstall	Episode: "Billy the Kid"
2007	Midsomer Murders	Ian King	Episode: "King's Crystal"
2007	Party Animals	Adrian Chapple	2 episodes
2007	A Very British Sex Scandal	Edward McNally	Television film
2007	Rebus	Peter Carr	Episode: "Knots and Crosses"
2009	Breaking the Mould: The Story of Penicillin	Dr. Charles Fletcher	Television film
2009	Doctors	Scott Nielson	21 episodes
2010	First Light	Geoffrey 'Boy' Wellum	Television film
2010	Any Human Heart	Lieutenant McStay	Episode: "#1.2"
2011	A Princess for Christmas	Prince Ashton of Castlebury	Television film
2014–2026	Outlander	Jamie Fraser	Lead role and producer
2018	The Adventure Show	Himself	Episode: "Take A Hike"
2021–present	Men in Kilts: A Roadtrip with Sam and Graham	Himself	Also producer
2022	Suspect	Ryan	
2023–present	The Couple Next Door	Danny	Lead role

=== Theatre ===
Year	Title	Role	Theatre
2001	The Twits	Bird	Citizens Theatre, Glasgow
2002	Outlying Islands	John	Royal Court Jerwood Theatre Upstairs, London
2005	Knives in Hens	Pony William	TAG Theatre Company, Glasgow
2007	The Vortex	Tom Veryan	Royal Exchange Theatre, Manchester
2007	Hamlet	Guildenstern / Fortinbras	Citizens Theatre, Glasgow
2007	The Pearlfisher	Roderick / Eddie the Gaffer	Traverse Theatre, Edinburgh
2008	Romeo and Juliet	Paris	Dundee Repertory Theatre
2008	Macbeth	Malcolm / Murderer	Royal Lyceum Theatre, Edinburgh
2009	Plague Over England	Gregory	Duchess Theatre, West End
2010	The Talented Mr. Ripley	Richard Greenleaf	Royal & Derngate, Northampton
2011	Amphibians	Max	Bridewell Theatre, London
2011–12	Batman Live	Batman	Touring show
2012	King John	King John	Òran Mór Theatre, Glasgow
2025	Macbeth	Macbeth	The Other Place, Stratford-upon-Avon (Royal Shakespeare Company)

=== Video games ===
Year	Title	Role	Notes
2018	Lego DC Super-Villains	Mirror Master (voice)	

=== Audio ===
Year	Title	Role	Notes
2026	Three Days in Galloway	Callum McKay	Main role

== Awards and nominations ==
Year	Nominated work	Award	Category	Result
2003	Outlying Islands	Laurence Olivier Awards	Laurence Olivier Award for Most Promising Performer	Nominated
2010	Doctors	The British Soap Awards	Villain of the Year	Nominated
2011	A Princess For Christmas	Grace Awards	Most Inspiring Performance in Television	Nominated
2014	Outlander	TV Guide Awards	Favourite Duo (shared with Caitriona Balfe)	Won
2015	Outlander	The Anglophile Channel Awards	Favorite British Artist of the Year	Won
2015	Outlander	The Anglophile Channel Awards	Best Actor in a Television Series	Won
2015	Outlander	Saturn Awards	Best Supporting Actor on Television	Nominated
2015	Outlander	EWwy Awards	Best Actor in a Drama Series	Won
2016	Outlander	People's Choice Awards	Favorite Cable Sci-Fi/Fantasy TV Actor	Nominated
2016	Outlander	The Anglophile Channel Awards	Favorite British Artist of the Year	Won
2016	Outlander	The Anglophile Channel Awards	Best Actor in a Television Series	Won
2016	Outlander	Saturn Awards	Best Actor on Television	Nominated
2016	Outlander	BAFTA Scotland	Best Actor Television	Nominated
2016	Outlander	Critics' Choice Television Awards	Best Actor in a Drama Series	Nominated
2016	Outlander	Satellite Awards	Best Ensemble (Television)	Nominated
2017	Outlander	People's Choice Awards	Favorite Sci-Fi/Fantasy TV Actor	Won
2017	Outlander	Saturn Awards	Best Actor on a Television Series	Nominated
2018	Outlander	Saturn Awards	Best Actor on a Television Series	Nominated
2019	Outlander	Saturn Awards	Best Actor on a Television Series	Won
2021	Outlander	Critics' Choice Super Awards	Best Actor in a Science Fiction/Fantasy Series	Nominated
2021	Outlander	Saturn Awards	Best Actor on a Television Series	Nominated
2022	Outlander	Saturn Awards	Best Actor in a Network or Cable Television Series	Nominated
2024		Saturn Awards	Best Actor in a Television Series	Nominated

== Honours ==
- Heughan received an honorary doctorate "in recognition for his outstanding contribution to acting and charitable endeavours" from the University of Stirling in June 2019.
- He was awarded an honorary doctorate in recognition of his artistic success and charitable work by the University of Glasgow in July 2019.
- He received an honorary doctorate from the Royal Conservatoire of Scotland on 7 July 2022.
