= Laurence Olivier Award for Most Promising Performer =

Retired award for London theatre

- Awarded for: Most Promising Performer
- Location: England
- Presented by: Society of London Theatre
- First award: 2002
- Final award: 2003
- Website: officiallondontheatre.com/olivier-awards/

The Laurence Olivier Award for Most Promising Performer was an annual award presented by the Society of London Theatre in recognition of the "world-class status of London theatre." The awards were established as the Society of West End Theatre Awards in 1976, and renamed in 1984 in honour of English actor and director Laurence Olivier.

This commingled actor/actress award was introduced in 2002, was also presented in 2003, then was retired. On the two occasions that this award was given, it was presented to an actor.

== Winners and nominees ==
=== 2000s ===
| Year | Performer | Musical | Character |
2002
| 2002 | Benjamin Davies | Fucking Games | Danny |
| 2002 | Jack Davenport | The Servant | Tony |
| 2002 | Ralf Little | Presence | George Harrison |
| 2002 | Leah Muller | Six Characters Looking for an Author | The Stepdaughter |
2003
| 2003 | Noel Clarke | Where Do We Live | Shed |
| 2003 | Toby Dantzic | Where Do We Live | Ron |
| 2003 | Sam Heughan | Outlying Islands | John |
| 2003 | Sid Mitchell | The Dead Eye Boy | Soren |
