= Laurence Olivier Award for Best Company Performance =

Retired award for London theatre

- Awarded for: Best Company Performance
- Location: England
- Presented by: Society of London Theatre
- First award: 2009
- Final award: 2009
- Website: officiallondontheatre.com/olivier-awards/

The Laurence Olivier Award for Best Company Performance was a one-off award presented by the Society of London Theatre in recognition of the "world-class status of London theatre." The awards were established as the Society of West End Theatre Awards in 1976, and renamed in 1984 in honour of English actor and director Laurence Olivier.

This award was only presented once, at the 2009 Laurence Olivier Awards.

== Winners and nominees ==
=== 2000s ===
Year	Production	Director
2009
2009	The Histories	Michael Boyd
2009	August: Osage County	Anna D. Shapiro
2009	Black Watch	John Tiffany
2009	The Norman Conquests	Matthew Warchus
2009	Sunset Boulevard	Craig Revel Horwood
