= John Warnaby =

British actor (1960–2024)

John Warnaby (6 November 1960 – 13 April 2024) was a British actor on stage, television and in films. In later life he became a Catholic priest.

== Education and early career ==
John Michael Warnaby was born on 6 November 1960. He attended St Teresa's Primary School in the Birmingham suburb of Handsworth Wood, before going to St Philip's Grammar School in Edgbaston from 1972 to 1979. Between 1979 and 1982 he read theology at Oriel College, Oxford.

After university Warnaby worked for the Corporation of Lloyd's as a regulator in the area of solvency and financial reporting. He set up an office in Atlanta, Georgia in the USA, where he worked with investors for two years. He continued to work in this field until 2000.

== Acting career ==
While still working for Lloyd's, Warnaby embarked on a career as an actor.

His breakthrough came in 1988 in a stage adaptation of Tom Stoppard's radio play Artist Descending a Staircase, directed by Tim Luscombe, in which Warnaby played the young version of the character Donner (the older version being played by Frank Middlemass). It was first performed at the Kings Head, Islington, London, later transferring to the Duke of York's Theatre in the West End.

Warnaby joined the RSC for the 1990/91 season in The Swan in Stratford and the Pit at the Barbican in London. He played Paris in Sam Mendes's production of Troilus and Cressida (played by Ralph Fiennes and Amanda Root) and doubled as the Earl of Lancaster and the Abbot of Neath in Gerard Murphy's production of Edward II (played by Simon Russell Beale). He also appeared in Richard Nelson's Two Shakespearean Actors, directed by Roger Michell, and The Shakespeare Revue, devised and directed by Christopher Luscombe and Malcolm McKee.

In 1996 Warnaby appeared at the National Theatre, playing Napoleon Bonaparte and Boris Dubretskoy in Helen Edmundson's adaptation of Tolstoy's War and Peace, directed by Nancy Meckler.

In 2001 Warnaby played Freddie in Laurence Boswell's revival of Peter Nichols's play A Day in the Death of Joe Egg at the Comedy Theatre in a cast which included Eddie Izzard, Victoria Hamilton and Prunella Scales.

In 2006 he appeared in the television adaptation of Alan Hollinghurst's novel The Line of Beauty.

In Nicholas de Jongh's 2009 stage hit in London Plague Over England, Warnaby played both 1950s Home Secretary David Maxwell Fyfe and an acerbic theatre critic.

== Later life and death ==
In later life, Warnaby retired from acting and trained as a Catholic priest. In 2013 he was sent to the Pontifical Beda College in Rome. On his ordination in 2017, his first appointment was as Assistant Priest at St Monica's, Palmers Green. In 2019 he moved to St George's, Sudbury as Assistant Priest. The following year he moved to St Joseph's, Carpenders Park, initially as Assistant Priest and, from 2022, as Parish Priest.

Warnaby died after a short illness on 13 April 2024, at the age of 63. His funeral took place in his own parish of St Joseph's. Cardinal Vincent Nichols, Archbishop of Westminster, presided over the Requiem Mass.

== Filmography ==
Year	Title	Role	Notes
1982	Privileged	Treasurer	
1990	Paper Mask	Dr. Hammond	
1998	The Commissioner	Hugo	
1999	Topsy-Turvy	Mr. Sanders	
2001	Dark Blue World	RAF Instructor	
2002	Ali G Indahouse	David Griffiths	
2003	Midsomer Murders	Keith Scholey	(Season 6, Ep. 1)
2004	Wimbledon	Reporter #2	
2005	Separate Lies	Simon	
2010	The King's Speech	Steward	
2012	The Raven	Griswold	
2012	The Sweeney	Mr. Bledisloe	
2012	Capital	Stanley Greenball	
2012	Les Misérables	Majordomo	
