= Sassenach (disambiguation) =

Sassenach originally meant an Anglo-Saxon from the Lowlands of Scotland or England, in the 20th century, both Lowlanders and Gaels tended to use it as a disparaging term for an English person.

Sassenach may also refer to:

- Sassenach (Outlander) — Title of a television episode
- Claire Fraser (character) — The eponymous character
- Catherine Cesnik
