= 2009 Laurence Olivier Awards =

Edition of London theatre awards

- Date: 2 March 2009

The 2009 Laurence Olivier Awards were held in 2009 in London celebrating excellence in West End theatre by the Society of London Theatre.

== Winners and nominees ==
Details of winners (in bold) and nominees, in each award category, per the Society of London Theatre.

Best New Play	Best New Musical
**Black Watch by Gregory Burke – Barbican**; August: Osage County by Tracy Letts – National Theatre Lyttelton; That Face by Polly Stenham – Duke of York's; The Pitmen Painters by Lee Hall – National Theatre Cottesloe	**Jersey Boys – Prince Edward**; Zorro – Garrick
Best Revival	Best Musical Revival
**The Histories – Roundhouse**; The Chalk Garden – Donmar Warehouse; The Norman Conquests – Old Vic	**La Cage aux Folles – Playhouse**; Piaf – Donmar Warehouse / Vaudeville; Sunset Boulevard – Comedy; West Side Story – Sadler's Wells
Best New Comedy	Best Entertainment
**God of Carnage by Yasmina Reza, translated by Christopher Hampton – Gielgud**; Fat Pig by Neil LaBute – Comedy; The Female of the Species by Joanna Murray-Smith – Vaudeville	**La Clique – Hippodrome**; Brief Encounter – Cinema Haymarket; Maria Friedman: Rearranged – Trafalgar Studios
Best Actor	Best Actress
**Derek Jacobi as Malvolio in Twelfth Night – Wyndham's / Donmar Warehouse**; David Bradley as Spooner in No Man's Land – Duke of York's; Michael Gambon as Hirst in No Man's Land – Duke of York's; Adam Godley as Raymond Babitt in Rain Man – Apollo	**Margaret Tyzack as Mrs St. Maugham in The Chalk Garden – Donmar Warehouse**; Deanna Dunagan as Violet Weston in August: Osage County – National Theatre Lyttelton; Lindsay Duncan as Martha in That Face – Duke of York's; Penelope Wilton as Miss Madrigal in The Chalk Garden – Donmar Warehouse
Best Actor in a Musical	Best Actress in a Musical
**Douglas Hodge as Albin in La Cage aux Folles – Playhouse**; Denis Lawson as Georges in La Cage aux Folles – Playhouse; Ryan Molloy as Frankie Valli in Jersey Boys – Prince Edward; Matt Rawle as Zorro in Zorro – Garrick	**Elena Roger as Édith Piaf in Piaf – Donmar Warehouse / Vaudeville**; Sofia Escobar as Maria in West Side Story – Sadler's Wells; Kathryn Evans as Norma Desmond in Sunset Boulevard – Comedy; Ruthie Henshall as Marguerite in Marguerite – Theatre Royal Haymarket; Emma Williams as Luisa in Zorro – Garrick
Best Performance in a Supporting Role	Best Performance in a Supporting Role in a Musical
**Patrick Stewart as King Claudius and King Hamlet's Ghost in Hamlet – Novello**; Oliver Ford Davies as Polonius in Hamlet – Novello; Kevin R. McNally as Lebedev in Ivanov – Wyndham's, Donmar; Paul Ritter as Reg in The Norman Conquests – Old Vic	**Lesli Margherita as Inez in Zorro – Garrick**; Alexander Hanson as Otto in Marguerite – Theatre Royal Haymarket; Katherine Kingsley as Marlene Dietrich in Piaf – Donmar Warehouse / Vaudeville; Jason Pennycooke as Jacob in La Cage aux Folles – Playhouse; Dave Willetts as Max von Mayerling in Sunset Boulevard – Comedy
Best Company Performance
**The Histories – Roundhouse**; August: Osage County – National Theatre Lyttelton; Black Watch – Barbican; Sunset Boulevard – Comedy; The Norman Conquests – Old Vic
Best Director	Best Theatre Choreographer
**John Tiffany for Black Watch – Barbican**; Terry Johnson for La Cage aux Folles – Playhouse; Des McAnuff for Jersey Boys – Prince Edward; Emma Rice for Brief Encounter – Cinema Haymarket	**Steven Hoggett for Black Watch – Barbican**; Rafael Amargo for Zorro – Garrick; Lynne Page for La Cage aux Folles – Playhouse; Kate Prince for Into the Hoods – Novello; Sergio Trujillo for Jersey Boys – Prince Edward
Best Set Design	Best Costume Design
**Todd Rosenthal for August: Osage County – National Theatre Lyttelton**; Paul Brown for Marguerite – Theatre Royal Haymarket; Soutra Gilmour for The Collection and The Lover – Comedy; Neil Murray for Brief Encounter – Cinema Haymarket; Tom Piper for The Histories – Roundhouse	**Tom Piper and Emma Williams for The Histories – Roundhouse**; Rob Howell for The Norman Conquests – Old Vic; Christopher Oram for Twelfth Night – Wyndham's / Donmar Warehouse; Matthew Wright for La Cage aux Folles – Playhouse
Best Lighting Design	Best Sound Design
**Paule Constable for The Chalk Garden – Donmar Warehouse**; Neil Austin for No Man's Land – Duke of York's; Neil Austin for Piaf – Donmar Warehouse / Vaudeville; Paule Constable for Ivanov – Wyndham's / Donmar Warehouse	**Gareth Fry for Black Watch – Barbican**; Simon Baker for Brief Encounter – Cinema Haymarket; Steve C. Kennedy for Jersey Boys – Prince Edward; Ben Ringham, Max Ringham and Christopher Shutt for Piaf – Donmar Warehouse / Vaudeville
Outstanding Achievement in Dance	Best New Dance Production
**The ensemble for Impressing the Czar, Royal Ballet of Flanders – Sadler's Wells**; Maurice Chestnut, Marshall Davis Jr. and Savion Glover in Bare Soundz – Sadler's Wells; The ensemble for Infra, The Royal Ballet – Royal Opera House	**Café Müller and The Rite of Spring, Tanztheater Wuppertal – Sadler's Wells**; Impressing the Czar, Royal Ballet of Flanders – Sadler's Wells; Infra, The Royal Ballet – Royal Opera House; To Be Straight with You, DV8 Physical Theatre – National Theatre Lyttelton
Outstanding Achievement in Opera	Outstanding New Opera Production
**Edward Gardner for conducting Boris Godunov, Cavalleria rusticana, Der Rosenkavalier and Pagliacci, English National Opera – London Coliseum and Punch and Judy – Young Vic**; Patricia Bardon in Partenope and Riders to the Sea, English National Opera – London Coliseum and The Rake's Progress, The Royal Opera – Royal Opera House; Ferruccio Furlanetto in Don Carlo, The Royal Opera – Royal Opera House; Christine Rice in Partenope, English National Opera – London Coliseum and The Minotaur, The Royal Opera – Royal Opera House	**Partenope, English National Opera – London Coliseum**; Don Carlo, The Royal Opera – Royal Opera House; Pagliacci, English National Opera – London Coliseum; The Minotaur, The Royal Opera – Royal Opera House
Outstanding Achievement in an Affiliate Theatre
**The Pride – Royal Court**; The cast for Oxford Street – Royal Court; Jo Newbery for set designing Scarborough – Royal Court; Clive Rowe in Mother Goose – Hackney Empire
Society Special Award
**Alan Ayckbourn**

== Productions with multiple nominations and awards ==
The following 24 productions, including two ballets and four operas, received multiple nominations:

- 7: La Cage aux Folles
- 5: Black Watch, Jersey Boys, Piaf and Zorro
- 4: August: Osage County, Brief Encounter, Sunset Boulevard, The Chalk Garden, The Histories and The Norman Conquests
- 3: Marguerite, No Man's Land and Partenope
- 2: Don Carlo, Hamlet, I pagliacci, Impressing the Czar, Infra, Ivanov, That Face, The Minotaur, Twelfth Night and West Side Story

The following four productions received multiple awards:

- 4: Black Watch
- 3: The Histories
- 2: La Cage aux Folles and The Chalk Garden

== See also ==
- 63rd Tony Awards
