= When the Starlight Ends =

- Directed by: Adam Sigal
- Written by: Adam Sigal
- Produced by: Patrick Hughes; Bryan O’Connell; Mike Gillespie; Eric Skinner; Christopher Lemole
- Starring: Sam Heughan; Arabella Oz
- Production companies: Armory Films; Primary Wave Entertainment
- Distributed by: Cinedigm
- Release date: October 2016 (Other Venice Film Festival)
- Country: United States
- Language: English

When the Starlight Ends is a 2016 American fantasy comedy-drama film written and directed by Adam Sigal and starring Sam Heughan and Arabella Oz. It is Sigal's directorial debut.

== Cast ==
- Sam Heughan as Jacob
- Arabella Oz as Cassandra
- Sean Patrick Flanery
- Armando Gutierrez as Don
- Hunter Gomez as Danny
- Georgia Cook as Ellie
- George Griffith as Jimmy
- AlexAnn Hopkins as Eva
- David Arquette as Bill

== Production ==
Heughan and Oz were cast in the film in January 2015.

== Release ==
The film premiered at the Other Venice Film Festival in October 2016.

== Accolades ==
At the Other Venice Film Festival, Heughan and Oz won the awards for "Best Feature Film Actor" and "Best Feature Film Actress" respectively whereas film director Sigal won the award for "Most Excellent Feature Film Director".
