= Plague Over England =

2008 play written by Nicholas de Jongh

- West End Premiere Poster
- Original language: English
- Written by: Nicholas de Jongh
- Characters: John Gielgud; Sybil Thorndike
- Genre: Drama
- Setting: London

Premiere
- Date: February 2008 - World Premiere; February 24, 2009 - West End Premiere

Plague Over England is a play written by Nicholas de Jongh, based on a real-life incident when actor John Gielgud was arrested for lewd behavior in 1953; it provides an insight into the changes in the lives of gay people over the last fifty years. It received universally positive reviews when it received its world premiere at the Finborough Theatre in 2008, and subsequently transferred to the West End with an updated cast for a limited run.

== Plot summary ==
On 21 October 1953, John Gielgud was arrested in a public lavatory after being entrapped by a "pretty policeman". There followed a high-profile court case, reenacted in Plague Over England.

== Productions ==
The Evening Standard critic Nicholas de Jongh's first play premiered at the Finborough Theatre in February 2008, and transferred to the West End's Duchess Theatre in February 2009, with Michael Feast as Gielgud and Celia Imrie as Sybil Thorndike. The cast included: Michael Brown, David Burt, Simon Dutton, Steven Hansell, Sam Heughan, Hugh Ross and John Warnaby. It was directed by Tamara Harvey.

== Reception ==
The production received largely positive reviews, many particularly praising Imrie and Feast. However, despite rave reviews, the production closed two weeks early on 2 May 2009.

=== Critic quotes ===
- "...Michael Feast, who knew Gielgud personally, gives a beautifully deft tragi-comic performance as the great actor, at once unworldly, lecherous, self-mocking and full of fear...Celia Imrie offers a delicious double as a touchingly sympathetic Sybil Thorndike... bravo!" Charles Spencer, Daily Telegraph.
- "Lively...arresting." Benedict Nightingale, The Times.
- "Compelling...a terrific first play." The Evening Standard.
- "Bracing, moving and intelligent" Sunday Express.
