= Peter Forbes (actor) =

Scottish actor (born 1960)

Peter Forbes (born 1960) is a Scottish actor known for his roles in West End musicals, including Follies in 2017 to 2019, and for his audio recording work.

== Early life and education ==
Born in Glasgow, Forbes was educated at the University of Edinburgh and the Bristol Old Vic Theatre School.

== Stage, TV and film career ==
In 1999 at the Regent's Park Open Air Theatre, he appeared as Marcus Lycus in A Funny Thing Happened on the Way to the Forum and, later that season, as Sir Toby Belch in Twelfth Night. In 2003, at the same theatre, he played Seth Lord in High Society. With the Royal National Theatre in 2017–2018, and again in their 2019 revival, he was Buddy Plummer in Stephen Sondheim's Follies. His other theatre work includes The James Plays, Our Country's Good, The Observer, Afterlife, Never So Good and Two Weeks with The Queen with the Royal National Theatre; Mamma Mia! at the Prince Edward Theatre; Singin' in the Rain at the Palace Theatre; Black Watch with the National Theatre of Scotland; How to Hold Your Breath at the Royal Court Theatre; The Same Deep Water As Me at the Donmar Warehouse; The Winter's Tale at Shakespeare's Globe; A Number and Educating Agnes at the Royal Lyceum Theatre, Edinburgh; Juno and the Paycock, Richard III, Hedda Gabler and Guys and Dolls in Leicester with Haymarket Studio. In March to April 2025, he portrayed Stalin, co-starring with Roger Allam (Churchill) in Howard Brenton's play, Churchill in Moscow at the Orange Tree Theatre.

On television, Forbes has appeared in Traces, Manhunt, Poldark, Endeavour, Victoria, King Lear, The Crown, The Government Inspector, Holby City, EastEnders, Taggart, Casualty, Berkeley Square and The Bill.

== Selected filmography ==
- Blue Ice (1992) - Medic
- Wilde (1997) - Detective
- The Children Act (2017) - James MacLeish
- The Wife (2017) - James Finch
- National Theatre Live: Allelujah! (2018) - Hospital Chairman (National Theatre Live)
- Judy (2019) - Richardson

== Audio work ==
Forbes is a prolific narrator of audiobooks. He has recorded books by Peter May. The Sleeper and the Spindle by Neil Gaiman, one of the audio productions to which he contributed, was a finalist in two categories for the 21st annual Audie Awards in 2016.

Forbes has also recorded several Doctor Who audio plays:

- Doctor Who Unbound: Deadline (2003) – Phillip
- Dalek Empire III: Chapter 1 – The Exterminators (2004) – Dan Culver
- Dalek Empire III: Chapter 2 – The Healers (2004) – Dan Culver
- Dalek Empire III: Chapter 3 – The Survivors (2004)- Dan Culver
- Dalek Empire III: Chapter 4 – The Demons (2004) – Culver/Officer/Scavenger
- Dalek Empire III: Chapter 5 – The Warriors (2004) – Dan Culver
- Dalek Empire III: Chapter 6 – The Future (2004) – Dan Culver
- Doctor Who: The Juggernauts (2005) – Kryson
