= Galloway distillery =

Gin and whisky distillery in Newton Stewart, Scotland

Galloway Distillery

Region: Lowland
- Location: Wigtown Road, Newton Stewart, Dumfries & Galloway, DG8 6AS, Scotland, United Kingdom
- Coordinates: 54.9497°N 4.4814°W
- Owner: Sam Heughan; Alex Norouzi
- Founded: 2017; 9 years ago
- Founder: Graham Taylor; Billy Taylor; Craig Rankin
- Status: Operational
- No. of stills: 5 x 250 litre pot stills
- Capacity: 25,000 litres
- Website: gallowaydistillery.com

Galloway distillery is a gin and single malt whisky distillery in Newton Stewart, Dumfries and Galloway, Scotland. The distillery is co-owned by Outlander actor Sam Heughan, and produces Heughan's Sassenach gin, whisky and vodka brands.

Until 2025, the distillery was known as Crafty distillery. The flagship gin, Hills & Harbour, is made using base spirit distilled from scratch on-site.

== History ==
The distillery was founded by Graham Taylor, his father Billy Taylor, and friend Craig Rankin under the name "Crafty distillery". Graham Taylor had previously run a marketing agency, Billy Taylor was in construction; Rankin was a hotel operator and chef. The original aim was to bring attention to the craft distillation process. Plans for the distillery were submitted in 2015.

Construction began in February 2017, using larch wood sourced from a sawmill at Kirkcowan. The first distillation of gin was in spring of that year. The site had a bar and cafe, and offered tours to the public.

In 2020, the distillery made public their intention to produce Scotch whisky. The eventual release, it was announced, would use the brand name "Billy & Co." - named for Taylor Sr., who had by then passed away. The distillery also joined a trial programme with Bairds Malt to help evaluate new barley varietals. The first run of whisky took place in 2022; the distillery used only Scottish barley and fermentation times could be as long as 168 hours.

Expansion plans were announced in 2024, and Dumfries and Galloway Council approved construction of a new production and visitor facility at the site. The plans included a commitment to net zero production.

The distillery was acquired by Sam Heughan and Alex Norouzi in 2025, and renamed to Galloway Distillery. Heughan and Norouzi had previously launched the Sassenach Spirits brand in 2021. The Sassenach gin had already been contract-distilled at Crafty; the distillery subsequently announced that production of Sassenach vodka and whisky would be brought in-house as well.

== Products ==
In summer 2017, the distillery launched Hills & Harbour Gin, using noble fir, bladderwrack, mango and Sichuan pepper amongst other botanicals. A third of the botanicals used were sourced in Galloway. The grain neutral spirit was made from scratch onsite at the distillery, the whole process taking around 14 days.

In 2018, a single bottle of Hills & Harbour gin was made using water collected from snow that fell around the distillery during Anticyclone Hartmut. The original product was relaunched in 2021, with a bottle designed to be reused as a vase or ewer.

A limited edition annual gin release, called Galloway Gin, was made between 2018 and 2024. The botanicals for this release were all foraged in Scotland, including crab apples, chanterelle mushroom, cicely and elderberry.

The Sassenach gin was first released in June 2023, and was named after a term frequently used by Heughan's character in the TV series Outlander. The recipe was developed by Rankin on behalf of Heughan and Norouzi, and used all Scottish botanicals including heather, Scots pine resin, oats, rhubarb and blaeberry. The gin was listed in four Tom Kitchin venues in December 2023.
