= Laurence Olivier Award for Most Promising Playwright =

Retired award for London theatre

- Awarded for: Most Promising Playwright
- Location: England
- Presented by: Society of London Theatre
- First award: 2002
- Final award: 2003
- Website: officiallondontheatre.com/olivier-awards/

The Laurence Olivier Award for Most Promising Playwright was an annual award presented by the Society of London Theatre in recognition of the "world-class status of London theatre." The awards were established as the Society of West End Theatre Awards in 1976, and renamed in 1984 in honour of English actor and director Laurence Olivier.

This award was introduced in 2002, was also presented in 2003, then was retired.

== Winners and nominees ==
=== 2000s ===
Year	Writer	Production
2002
2002	Grae Cleugh	Fucking Games
2002	Abi Morgan	Tender
2002	Simon Stephens	Herons
2003
2003	Charlotte Eilenberg	The Lucky Ones
2003	Christopher Shinn	Where Do We Live
