= Play Without Words =

Play Without Words is a 2002 ballet by English choreographer Matthew Bourne with music by Terry Davies. The work is an adaptation of the Joseph Losey film The Servant, after the Robin Maugham novel of the same title.
