= Benjamin Davies (actor) =

Scottish actor

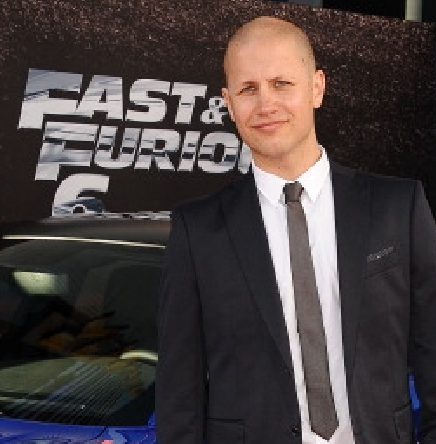
- Davies in May 2013
- Born: 19 September 1980 (age 46); Edinburgh, Scotland
- Other names: Ben Davies; Benjamin Davis
- Education: Drama Centre London (BA); University of East Anglia (MA)
- Occupation: Actor
- Years active: 2002–present
- Website: www.benjamindavies.net

Benjamin John Gareth Davies is a Scottish actor.

== Early life ==
Benjamin John Gareth Davies was born in Edinburgh, the son of Welsh parents. He grew up in England, where he was educated at Tavistock College in Tavistock and Priory School in Lewes before joining the Drama Centre in London at the age of 17; he trained in acting under Yat Malmgren, Reuven Adiv, and Christopher Fettes. His earliest performances were with the National Youth Theatre and at the Theatre Royal in Plymouth and Glyndebourne Opera House.

== Career ==
Davies was cast by the theatre director Dominic Cooke at the Royal Court Theatre, where he won a Laurence Olivier Award for Most Promising Performer for his portrayal of Danny in Grae Cleugh's Fucking Games. He then appeared at the Traverse Theatre to work with Wilson Milam, then to the National Theatre Studio. He played Dill in a production of Harper Lee's To Kill a Mocking Bird. Later that year, he worked with the avant-garde film director Peter Greenaway on The Tulse Luper Suitcases, Part 1: The Moab Story with Debbie Harry and The Tulse Luper Suitcases, Part 2: Vaux to the Sea with Isabella Rossellini.

Davies played Dominic Morrison in Sea of Souls for the BBC, then played Lawrence in the first ever production of Lovely Evening by Peter Gill for Daniel Evans' directorial début at the Young Vic Theatre. Later that year, he joined the Oxford Stage Company, appearing in Rookery Nook by Ben Travers for Dominic Dromgoole's final show with the OSC. Davies played Mickybo in Mojo Mickybo by Owen McCafferty at the Trafalgar Studios in the West End theatre.

In 2013, Davies had his first Hollywood role in Fast & Furious 6.He returned to the stage for the National Theatre of Scotland in the John Tiffany production of Black Watch which toured the UK, USA, and South Korea.

He returned to television screens for the crime drama Suspects, and went on to work with the American Israeli contemporary video artist Omer Fast on his first feature film Remainder, an adaptation of the book by British author Tom McCarthy. He returned to the American stage in Los Angeles to work with Steven Berkoff on his production of The Hairy Ape by Eugene O'Neill in 2016.

== Partial filmography ==
Year	Title	Role
2003	The Tulse Luper Suitcases, Part 1: The Moab Story	Hercule
2004	The Tulse Luper Suitcases, Part 2: Vaux to the Sea	Pip
2013	Fast & Furious 6	Adolfson
2015	Remainder	Driver
