= Sassenach =

Scottish exonym for an English person

A Sassenach is an Anglo-Saxon, or more specifically an English person. The Gaels used the Scottish Gaelic word Sasunnach, possibly derived from the Latin word Saxones, to mean Saxons in the broad sense, covering the various Germanic tribes from Scandinavia (including Angles and Jutes) who invaded Britain after the withdrawal of the Romans.

By the 18th century, this gave rise to the Scots and English loanword Sassenach (older spellings: Sassanich or Sassenagh), originally used to describe both English people and Scottish Lowlanders. In the 20th century, both Lowlanders and Gaels came to use it as a disparaging term for an English person.

== History ==
George Mackenzie, 1st Earl of Cromartie, previously Lord Tarbat and commissioner (member of the Parliament of Scotland) for Ross-shire, wrote a genealogy of Clan Mackenzie before becoming a Scottish representative peer under Queen Anne. In a letter published in 1706 discussing debates over the Treaty of Union, he said "Scotland is not our ancient Name; nay there is not such a Word in our ancient Language nor native Tongue .... in our Language the ancient Inhabitants of Britain were called Britich and in Latin Britanni", and "We call them Sassanich, in Latin Saxi or Saxoni".

In The Expedition of Humphry Clinker, published in 1771, the Scottish novelist Tobias Smollett reflected his experiences, including a recent tour of the Highlands, in fictional letters. One describes hunting the stag on the mountains of Morvern, where the poems of Ossian were heard "in the original Gallick" and a Highlander said he had no English, "hu niel Sassenagh", the "very same answer I should have received from a Welchman, and almost in the same words. The Highlanders have no other name for the people of the Low-country, but Sassenagh, or Saxons; a strong presumption, that the Lowland Scots and the English are derived from the same stock". The Oxford English Dictionary (OED) gives 1771 as the date of the earliest written use of the word in English.

The 1810 poem The Lady of the Lake by Walter Scott features tensions between Lowlanders – James V of Scotland and Douglases he had exiled – and a Highland clan chief. Scott noted "The Scottish Highlander calls himself, Gael, or Gaul, and terms the Lowlanders Sassenach, or Saxons". The boat song "Hail to the Chief", in the form of an iorram or Gaelic rowing song, has the lines "Widow and Saxon maid, Long shall lament our raid". In Waverley, a Highlander dismisses the suggestion that his friend is a common thief: "No - he that steals a cow from a poor widow, or a stirk from a cottar, is a thief; he that lifts a drove from a Sassenach laird is a gentleman-drover."

Jamie Fraser, main character of the book and TV series Outlander, uses Sassenach as a pet name for his English wife, Claire Fraser. A spirits brand, Sassenach Spirits, was founded in 2021 based on Fraser's usage of the term.
