= Nicholas de Jongh =

British writer, theatre critic and playwright

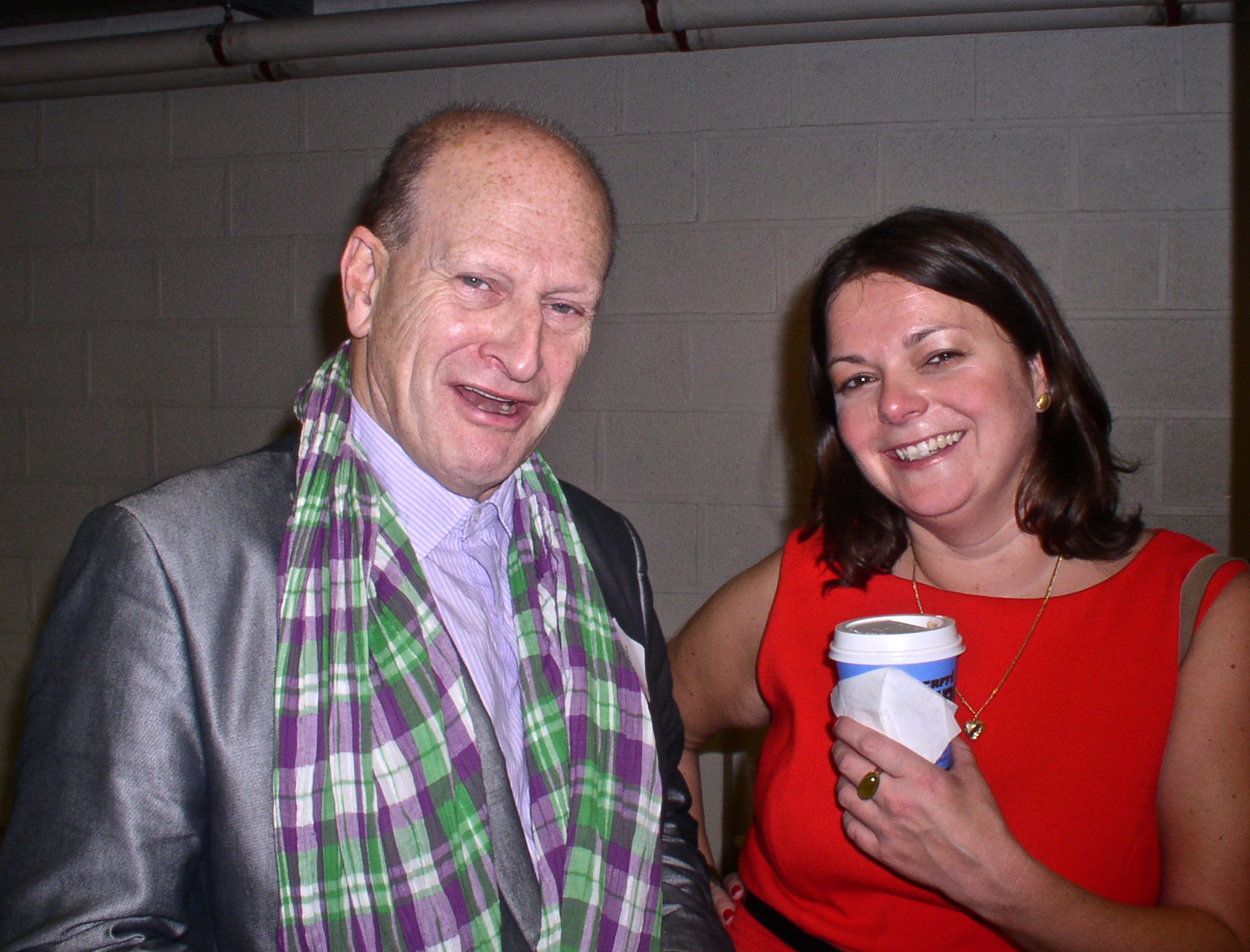
- Nicholas de Jongh (left) with Fiona Mountford in 2010
- Education: University College, London
- Occupation: Writer
- Writing career
- Genre: Criticism

Nicholas de Jongh is a British writer, theatre critic and playwright. He served as the senior drama critic of the Evening Standard from 1991 to 2009. Prior to that, he had worked for The Guardian for almost 20 years.

In October 1987, at a moment when British AIDS reporting was routinely sensationalist or moralistic, de Jongh broke with prevailing journalistic norms by interviewing his friend, the filmmaker Derek Jarman, for The Guardian and reported Jarman's HIV-positive status matter-of-factly.

In 2008, de Jongh successfully made the transition from critic to playwright when his play Plague Over England was staged at the Finborough Theatre in Earl's Court. Set in 1950s England, the play takes a look back at the arrest of the actor John Gielgud for homosexual soliciting at the height of his fame. The play was an instant hit and sold out for its run at the Finborough. In 2009, the play transferred to the West End.

Following the success of his first play, he resigned from his post at the Evening Standard to pursue a full-time writing career.

He has also written two books: Not in Front of the Audience (1992), a study of the depiction of homosexuality in English drama, and Politics, Pruderies and Perversions (2000), a history of British theatrical censorship.

== Education ==
De Jongh was a student at University College, London. While a student there, he was part of the team that made the semi-finals in the 1966–7 series of University Challenge.
