= Black Watch (play) =

Play written by Gregory Burke

- Original language: English
- Written by: Gregory Burke
- Subject: The Black Watch Regiment in Iraq 2004
- Genre: Drama
- Setting: Iraq War

Premiere
- Place: Edinburgh Festival Fringe

Black Watch is a play written by Gregory Burke and directed by John Tiffany as part of the first season of the National Theatre of Scotland.

Based on interviews with former soldiers, it portrays soldiers in the Black Watch regiment of the British Army serving on Operation TELIC in Iraq during 2004, prior to the amalgamation into the Royal Regiment of Scotland. Black Watch was first performed during the Edinburgh Festival Fringe on 1 August 2006 in a temporary traverse stage at the former University of Edinburgh Officer Training Corps' Drill hall.

Well received by critics, Black Watch has won four Olivier Awards including Best New Play. It has also won a Herald Angel, The Scotsman Fringe First, a Best Theatre Writing Award from The List, a Stage Award for Best Ensemble, the South Bank Show award for Theatre and four Critics' Awards for Theatre in Scotland.

== Context ==
The Black Watch regiment is based in Fife and the Tayside region in Scotland, and the British Army has been a part of their lives for generations. Their fathers, grandfathers, great grandfathers, have been soldiers in the regiment – a regiment that has been involved in virtually every major conflict since it was formed as the Gallant Forty Twa in 1739. "It's in the blood. It's part of who we are."

In October 2004, the Black Watch was at the centre of political controversy after the United States Army requested British forces to be moved further north outside of the British-controlled Multi-National Division, to replace forces temporarily redeployed for the Second Battle of Fallujah.

Despite objections in Parliament, the deployment went ahead. Based at Camp Dogwood, located between Fallujah and Karbala, in an area later dubbed the "Triangle of Death", the Black Watch came under sustained insurgent attack from mortars and rockets. On 4 November three soldiers and an interpreter were killed by a car bomb at a check point. The high-profile nature of the deployment caused a magnification of these deaths back home in Britain. On 16 December 2004, the controversy surrounding the Black Watch was further heightened by the official announcement that the regiment was to be amalgamated with the other regiments in the Scottish Division to form the Royal Regiment of Scotland. The then Secretary of State for Defence, Geoff Hoon, was accused by the SNP of "stabbing the soldiers in the back" and being motivated purely by political and administrative concerns, with little regard to the effect on morale.

== Cast and productions ==
	Original cast	2008 cast	2010 cast	2012-13 cast
Cammy	Brian Ferguson	Paul Rattray	Jack Lowden	Ryan Fletcher/Stuart Martin
Granty	Paul Rattray	Jonathan Holt	Richard Rankin	
Rossco	Jordan Young	Henry Pettigrew	Ross Anderson	Adam McNamara
Stewarty	Ali Craig	Steven Miller	Chris Starkie	Benjamin Davies
Macca	David Colvin		Cameron Barnes	
Nabsy	Nabil Stewart	Ryan Fletcher	Stuart Martin	Gavin Jon Wright
Lord Elgin	Peter Forbes		Ian Pirie	Stephen McCole
Writer/Sergeant	Paul Higgins	Michael Nardone	Adam McNamara	Robert Jack
Kenzie	Ryan Fletcher	Paul James Corrigan	Scott Fletcher	
Fraz	Emun Elliott		James Quinn	Andrew Fraser
Officer	Peter Forbes		Ian Pirie	Stephen McCole
Understudies			Paul Tinto	Daniel Portman; Matt McClure

Other cast members have included: Tom Smith (Sergeant/ Writer – 2007 Scottish tour), Jack Fortune (Officer – 2007–2008), Duncan Anderson (Rossco, 2008).

Black Watch was the first National Theatre of Scotland production to be performed internationally. Productions tours have travelled:

- 2006 – Edinburgh
- 2007 – Pitlochry, Aberdeen, Glasgow, Dumfries, Dingwall, Los Angeles, New York City
- 2008 – Sydney, Perth, Western Australia, Wellington, Glenrothes, Glasgow, Coventry, Salford, Blaenau Gwent, Norfolk, Virginia, Toronto, London, Dublin, New York City
- 2010 – Glasgow, Aberdeen, Belfast, London
- 2011 – Washington, D.C., North Carolina, Texas, Coventry, Glenrothes, Chicago, New York
- 2012 – Washington, D.C., Chicago, Seoul
- 2013 – Glasgow, Norfolk and Norwich Festival, Seattle, San Francisco

== Score ==
The production's score features new music and arrangements of traditional songs from composer Davey Anderson alongside contemporary chart hits, instrumentals and recordings. Traditional songs are sung live by the cast. The Black Bear is performed live on bagpipes.

- Salute to the Commonwealth – The Band of HM Royal Marines Scotland
- Spitting Games – Snow Patrol
- First Sleep – Cliff Martinez
- Gallant Forty Twa – Traditional, arr. Davey Anderson
- Selection – The Black Watch Pipes and Drums
- Forfar Sodgar – Traditional, arr. Davey Anderson
- Farewell to Nigg – Shooglenifty
- Summer 78 – Yann Tiersen
- Twa Recruiting Sergeants – Traditional, arr. Davey Anderson
- Maybe You're My Puppet – Cliff Martinez
- Last Days – Max Richter
- A Thearlaich Òig (Oh Young Charles Stewart) – Margaret Bennett & Martyn Bennett
- Flowers of the Forest – Traditional, arr. Davey Anderson
- Black Bear – Traditional, arr. Davey Anderson

== Reviews ==
"They were every soldier; they were also irreducibly themselves. This exquisitely sustained double vision makes Black Watch one of the most richly human works of art to have emerged from this long-lived war" The New York Times

"Rarely has the torpor, the tension, the nerve-shattering randomness of this conflict's violence been made so agonizingly real – in real time. Black Watch is like a dose of caffeine delivered directly to the bloodstream." The Washington Post

"Brimming with breathtaking theatricality, inventiveness, style, thought provoking intelligence, humour and heart…an unmissable piece of theatre." Metro

"A mature and complex piece of political theatre – fierce, passionate and unguarded." The Guardian

In September 2019, The Guardian writers listed Black Watch as the ninth best theatre show since 2000.

== Awards ==
The production has won multiple international awards including four Laurence Olivier Awards, four Critics' Awards for Theatre in Scotland and The South Bank Show Award for Theatre.

- Best Theatre Award, The South Bank Show Awards 2006
- Best Director, The Critics Circle Awards 2006
- Herald Angel Award, 2006
- Scotsman Fringe First Award, 2006
- Best Theatre Writing Award, The List, 2006
- Friends of the Fringe Award, 2006
- Best Ensemble, The Stage Awards, 2006
- Best Director, Best Ensemble, Best Technical Presentation & Best Production,

Critics’ Awards for Theatre in Scotland 2006-2007

- Best Play, Writers’ Guild of Great Britain Awards 2007
- Best Visiting Production, Manchester Evening News Award 2007
- Best Touring Production, Theatre Management Association Awards 2008
- Great Scot Award for Entertainment, Sunday Mail Great Scot Awards 2008
- Best Sound Design, Helpmann Awards 2008
- Best New Play, Best Director, Best Theatre Choreographer & Best Sound Design, Laurence Olivier Awards 2009
- Best Foreign Play, New York Drama Critics' Circle Awards 2009
- Outstanding Touring Production, The Dora Mavor Moore Awards 2009
- Best Touring Show (Theatre), The Austin Critics’ Table Awards 2010-11
- Outstanding Non-Resident Production, Helen Hayes Award 2013

== DVD release ==
A DVD recording of the play, including the Scottish BAFTA award-winning BBC Scotland documentary Black Watch: A Soldier's Story, was released in October 2008. It won in the international category in the 2008 Prix Circom Regional Programme Awards.
