= Outlying Islands (play) =

2002 play written by David Greig

- Original language: English
- Written by: David Greig
- Genre: Drama play
- Setting: Remote island of Scotland in 1939

Premiere
- Date: 2002
- Place: Edinburgh, Scotland

Outlying Islands is a 2002 drama play written by Scottish playwright David Greig. While all the events and characters in the play are works of fiction, it was inspired by Robert Atkinson's book Island Going.

== Synopsis ==
Set on a remote Scottish island in the summer of 1939, two ornithologists – young, impulsive and English Robert and the more-conservative-yet naive Scottish John – are sent to catalogue the bird colonies on the island. Together with the stern lease-holder of the island, Mr Kirk, and his young niece Ellen, they are the only inhabitants for the summer.

The play ruthlessly uncovers the motivations of its characters, resulting in a painful triangle between John, Robert and Ellen. It is about nature versus technology, old versus new, with the threat of the coming world war looming over it all.

== Production history ==
The play was first published and performed in 2002 and won a Fringe First award and a Herald Angel award after its premiere at the Traverse Theatre in Edinburgh, Scotland, during the Edinburgh Festival Fringe. It was revived at the Traverse in October 2014.

The play was performed by Sugarglass Theatre at the Connelly Theatre in New York in 2016 and later revived at the Samuel Beckett Theatre in Dublin in August 2017.

The play was revived in January 2019 by Atticist at the King's Head Theatre in London. It received an Off West nomination for Best Production.

== Casting History ==
Character	Original Cast, 2002	New York Cast, 2016	Dublin Cast, 2017	London Revival Cast, 2019	London Revival Cast, 2025
Robert	Laurence Mitchell	Jefferson White	Leonard Buckley	Tom Machell	Bruce Langley
John	Sam Heughan	Peter Corboy	Peter Corboy	Jack McMillan	Fred Woodley Evans
Kirk	Robert Carr	Leon Ingulsrud	Karl O’Neill	Ken Drury	Kevin McMonagle
Ellen	Lesley Hart	Maeve O'Mahony	Maeve O'Mahony	Rose Wardlaw	Whitney Kehinde
Captain	Robert Carr	Leon Ingulsrud	Karl O’Neill	Ken Drury	Kevin McMonagle

== See also ==
- 2002 in literature
- Scottish literature
