= Laurence Olivier Awards =

Annual awards for London theatre

Olivier Awards
- Current: 2026 Laurence Olivier Awards
- Laurence Olivier Award, designed by the sculptor Harry Franchetti, depicting Olivier as Henry V at The Old Vic in the 1937 production
- Awarded for: Best in London theatre
- Country: United Kingdom
- Presented by: Society of London Theatre
- First award: 1976; 50 years ago
- Website: Official website

The Laurence Olivier Awards, also commonly known as the Olivier Awards, are presented annually by the Society of London Theatre (SOLT) in recognition of the "world-class status of London theatre." The awards were originally known as the Society of West End Theatre Awards, but they were renamed in honour of the English actor of the same name in 1984.

The awards are given annually to individuals involved in West End productions and other leading non-commercial theatres based in London across a range of categories covering plays, musicals, dance, opera and affiliate theatre. A discretionary non-competitive Special Olivier Award is also given each year. The Olivier Awards are widely recognised as the highest honour in British theatre and drama, equivalent to the BAFTA Awards for film and television, and the Brit Awards for music. The Olivier Awards are considered equivalent to Broadway's Tony Awards, France's Molière Award, Spain's Premios Max, Australia's Helpmann Awards, Norway's Hedda Award and Russia's Golden Mask.

Since inception, the awards have been held at various venues and theatres across London, from 2012 to 2016 at the Royal Opera House, before moving to the Royal Albert Hall in 2017. Television coverage was broadcast in prime time on BBC Two in 2026, following ITV, who in turn acquired the rights from 2013 onwards, with radio coverage by Magic Radio.

Most recent Olivier Award winners
- 2026 Laurence Olivier Awards
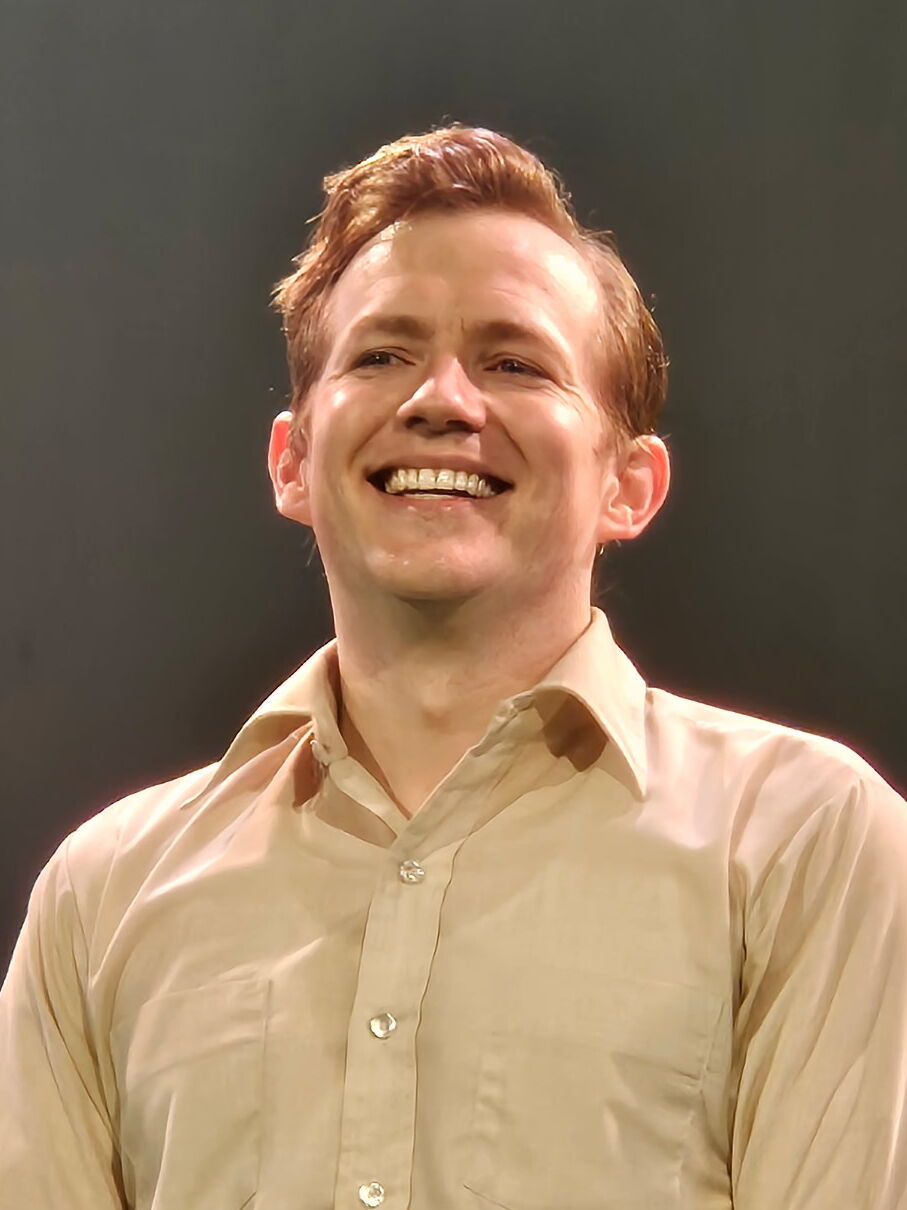

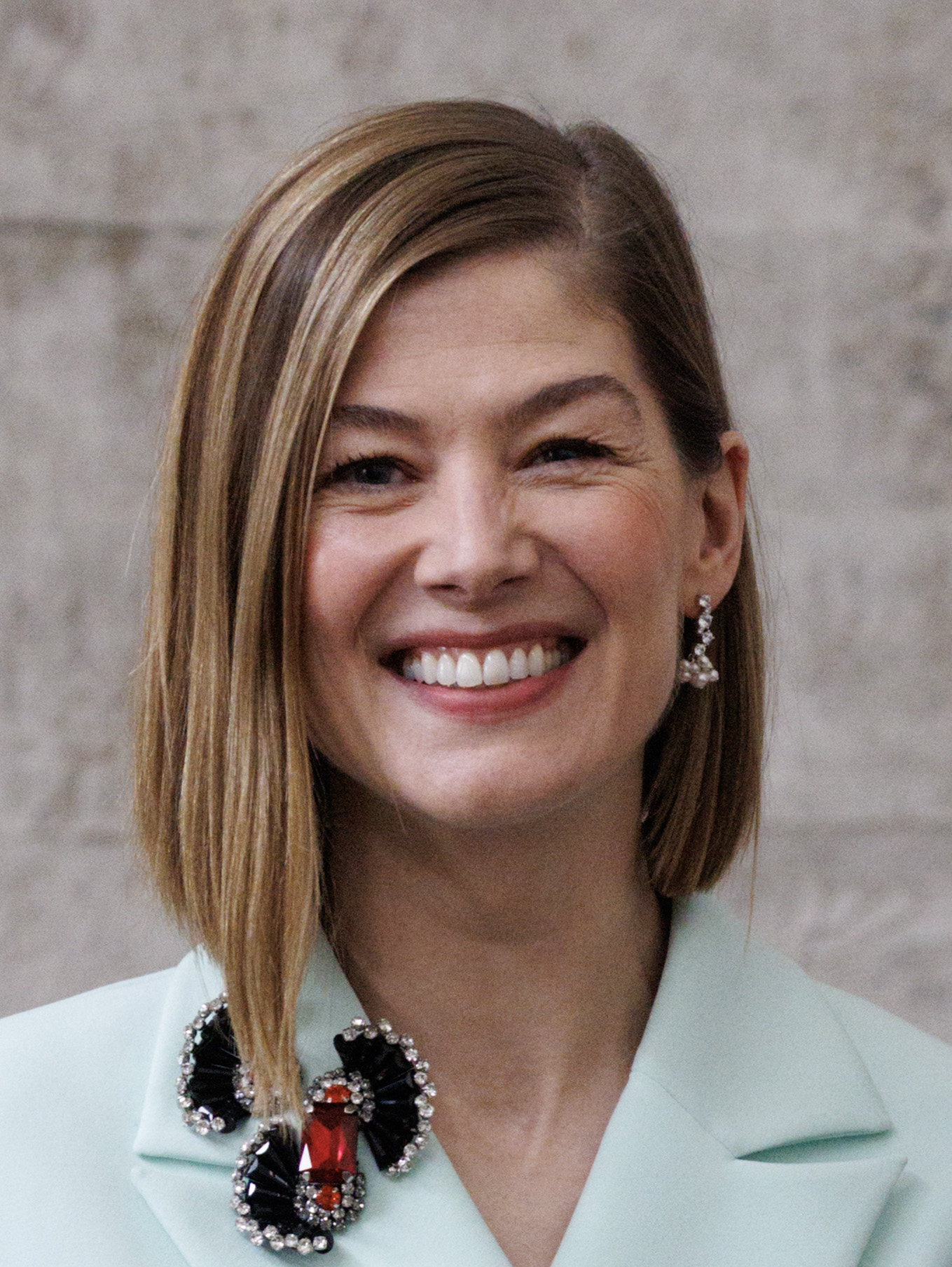

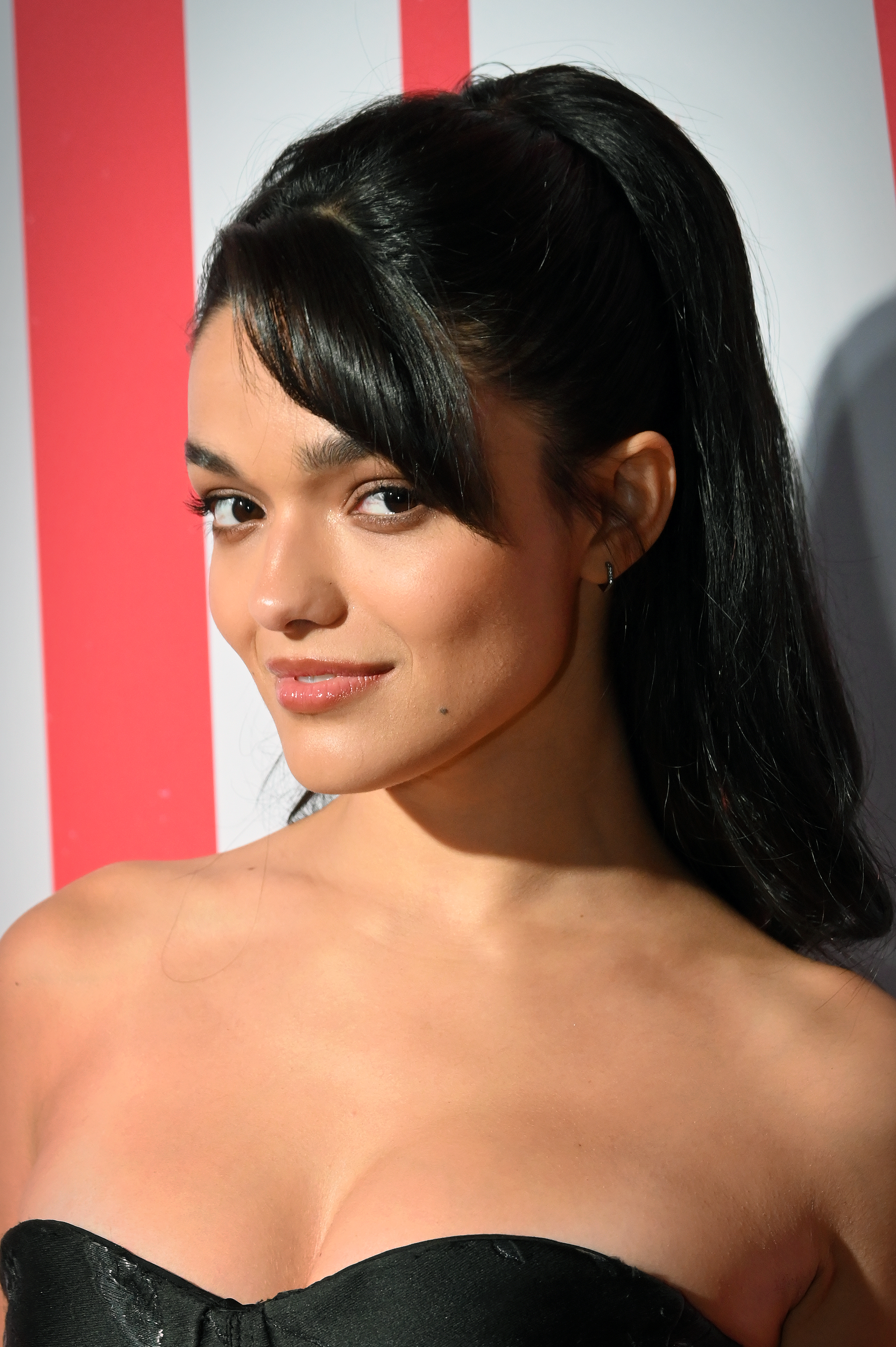
Award	Best Actor	Best Actress
Winner	Jack Holden (Kenrex)	Rosamund Pike (Inter Alia)
Award	Best Actor in a Musical	Best Actress in a Musical
Winner	James Hameed and Arti Shah (Paddington)	Rachel Zegler (Evita)
Award	Best Director
Winner	Luke Sheppard (Paddington)
Previous Best Musical
The Curious Case of Benjamin Button
Best Play
Giant
Best Musical
Paddington
Best Play
Punch

== History ==
The awards were established in 1976 by the Society of London Theatre as the Society of West End Theatre Awards and were designed by artist Tom Merrifield. The first ceremony was in December 1976 at the Café Royal. In 1984, British actor Laurence Olivier gave his consent for the awards to be renamed in his honour and they became known as the Laurence Olivier Awards.

== Judging ==
Every year, judging panels for theatre, opera, dance and affiliate shows are put together by the Society of London Theatre.

For opera, dance and affiliates, each panel is made up of a mix of professional panellists (journalists, casting directors, arts administrators, publishers and other industry professionals chosen for their knowledge in the field) and members of the public who are passionate about London theatre. The panels first select the shows they consider most worthy of an Olivier Award nomination, then vote on a winner at the end of the judging period.

For the theatre awards, a longlist is compiled by a panel made up of members of the public, and submitted to SOLT members to vote on. Members may still vote outside of the list at this stage, except for in the four Supporting Actor/Actress categories (as these each contain thousands of eligible performers). The members' votes are collated with those of the panellists to create the list of nominees. The nominees list is then voted on by both members and panellists to produce the winners.

== Ceremony ==
=== Hosts ===
Past hosts of the Olivier Awards ceremony include Michael Ball, Imelda Staunton, Clive Anderson, Gemma Arterton, Stephen Mangan, Hugh Bonneville, Sheridan Smith, Lenny Henry, Catherine Tate, Jason Manford, Hannah Waddingham and Nick Mohammed.

=== Venues ===
The venue most associated with the Awards is Grosvenor House Hotel, which has housed the after-show reception nine times and hosted the whole event on four further occasions. As well as at the Grosvenor, the presentations have been held at the Albery Theatre (now Noël Coward), Café Royal, Dominion Theatre, London Palladium, Lyceum Theatre, Park Lane Hilton, Piccadilly Theatre, Royal National Theatre Olivier, Royalty Theatre (now Peacock), Shaftesbury Theatre, Theatre Royal Drury Lane and Victoria Palace Theatre.

The awards ceremony was held at the Royal Opera House from 2012 to 2016, moving to the Royal Albert Hall in 2017.

== Broadcast ==
The first Laurence Olivier Awards to be broadcast on television was the 1981 ceremony, which was broadcast on BBC1. This continued until 1992, before a switch to BBC2 until 2003. The awards ceremony was then only broadcast on radio until 2011, when the BBC broadcast live interactive red-button coverage of the event, while Paul Gambaccini presented a programme on BBC Radio 2 with live coverage and interviews. The same coverage followed in 2012 before ITV secured the broadcast rights, which saw the return of the Olivier Awards to mainstream television in 2013. This has continued in recent years, and the ceremony has also been broadcast on Magic Radio. It returned to BBC Two and BBC Radio 2 in 2026.

== Award categories ==
=== Drama ===
- Best New Play
- Best Revival
- Best Entertainment or Comedy Play
- Best Actor
- Best Actress
- Best Actor in a Supporting Role
- Best Actress in a Supporting Role

=== Musical ===
- Best New Musical
- Best Musical Revival
- Best Actor in a Musical
- Best Actress in a Musical
- Best Actor in a Supporting Role in a Musical
- Best Actress in a Supporting Role in a Musical
- Outstanding Musical Contribution

=== Production ===
- Best Director
- Best Theatre Choreographer
- Best Set Design
- Best Costume Design
- Best Lighting Design
- Best Sound Design

=== Dance/Opera ===
- Best New Dance Production
- Best New Opera Production
- Outstanding Achievement in Dance
- Outstanding Achievement in Opera

=== Other ===
- Special Award
- Best Family Show
- Outstanding Achievement in an Affiliate Theatre

=== Retired ===
- Actor of the Year in a New Play
- Actress of the Year in a New Play
- Actor of the Year in a Revival
- Actress of the Year in a Revival
- Best Comedy Performance
- Best Performance in a Musical
- Best Performance in a Supporting Role
- Best Performance in a Supporting Role in a Musical
- Supporting Artist of the Year
- Best Newcomer in a Play
- Most Promising Performer
- Best Company Performance
- Best Director of a Play
- Best Director of a Musical
- Most Promising Playwright
- Best Set Designer
- Outstanding Achievement in a Musical
- Audience Award
- Best Original Score or New Orchestrations

== Award milestones ==
Some notable records and facts about the Laurence Olivier Awards include the following:

=== Productions ===
- The most Olivier Awards ever won in the history of the ceremony were given to the play Harry Potter and the Cursed Child in 2017, when it won nine awards including Best New Play.
- The record for the most Olivier Awards ever received by a musical is tied between Paddington: The Musical (2026), Sunset Boulevard (2024), Cabaret (2022), Hamilton (2018) and Matilda (2012) each of which received seven awards including Best Musical (for Matilda, Hamilton and Paddington) or Best Musical Revival (for Cabaret and Sunset Boulevard)
- The Curious Incident of the Dog in the Night-Time (2013) received seven Olivier Awards. Nicholas Nickleby (1980) and My Neighbour Totoro (2023) received six. Life of Pi (2022), Chimerica (2014), Sunday in the Park with George (2007), She Loves Me (1995) and Guys and Dolls (1982) received five. Gypsy (2016), The Book of Mormon (2014), After the Dance (2011), Spring Awakening (2010), Black Watch (2009), Hairspray (2008), Jerry Springer: The Opera (2004), All My Sons (2001), Billy Elliot (2006), Hedda Gabler (2006), Oklahoma (1999), Stanley (1997), Machinal (1994), Sweeney Todd (1994), An Inspector Calls (1993) and Carousel (1993) received four.
- The most nominations ever received by a production is 13 with Hamilton (2018) and Fiddler on the Roof (2025). Paddington: The Musical (2026), Into the Woods (2026),Sunset Boulevard (2024), Cabaret (2022), Harry Potter and the Cursed Child (2017) and Hairspray (2008) received 11. Follies (2018) had 10. Dear England (2024), Guys and Dolls (2024), My Neighbour Totoro (2023), Life of Pi (2022), & Juliet (2020), Come from Away (2019), Company (2019), Memphis (2015), Matilda (2012), Billy Elliot (2006), Mary Poppins (2005), Kiss Me, Kate (2002), Oklahoma (1999) and Carousel (1993) received nine. The Inheritance (2019), The Ferryman (2018), Groundhog Day (2017), Gypsy (2016), Beautiful: The Carole King Musical (2015), The Curious Incident of the Dog in the Night-Time (2013), The Producers (2005), Guys and Dolls (2006), Jerry Springer (2004), Pacific Overtures (2004), Ragtime (2004), My Fair Lady (2002), Spend, Spend, Spend (2000), The Lion King (2000), Tommy (1997), She Loves Me (1995) and Fiddler on the Roof (2020) received eight.
- Kiss Me, Kate (2002) holds the record for most nominations without any wins with nine.
- The play Stereophonic (2026) holds the record for most nominations without one for Best Production (play or musical, new or revival) with six.

=== Individuals ===
- Sonia Friedman is the producer with the most Olivier wins with 18. She is also the only producer to have won Best Play, Best Musical, Best Play Revival, and Best Musical Revival.

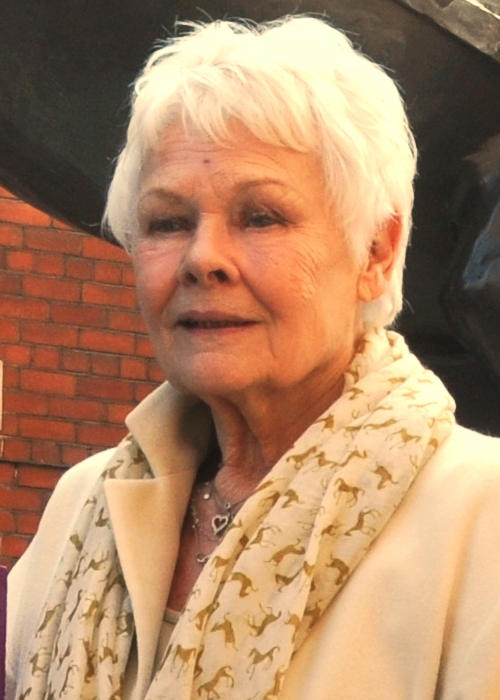
Judi Dench has a record seven competitive Oliviers, and also won a Special Olivier in 2004.

- William Dudley (designer), Judi Dench (actress) and Matthew Bourne (choreographer) are tied for the record for the most competitive wins by an individual with seven each. Dench also won a Special Olivier Award in 2004.
- Andrew Lloyd Webber (composer/producer) has won six plus the Special Olivier Award in 2008.
- Ian McKellen, Alan Bennett, Richard Eyre and Stephen Sondheim have all won five competitive awards plus the Special Olivier Award.
- Six wins: Paule Constable and Imelda Staunton.
- Five wins: Declan Donnellan, Mark Henderson, Mark Thompson.
- Four wins: Michael Bryant, Michael Frayn, Tim Goodchild, Clare Higgins, Alex Jennings, Sam Mendes, Trevor Nunn, Philip Quast, Willy Russell, Simon Russell Beale, Frances de la Tour, Paule Constable, Bunny Christie.
- Paule Constable has a record seventeen Olivier nominations, winning an Olivier six times.
- Michael Gambon has thirteen Olivier nominations, winning an Olivier three times.
- Imelda Staunton has fifteen Olivier Nominations, winning the Olivier Award five times.
- Performers who have won Olivier Awards in both the play and musical categories are: Simon Russell Beale, Jonathan Pryce, Henry Goodman, Imelda Staunton, Judi Dench, Sheridan Smith, Janie Dee, Sharon D. Clarke, Sheila Atim and Eddie Redmayne.
  - Of those 10, Judi Dench is the only performer to win both the play and musical Olivier acting awards in the same year (1996) – for her performances in Absolute Hell and A Little Night Music.
- In 1991 Karla Burns became the first black performer to win the award, for the role of Queenie in the Royal Shakespeare Company's production of Show Boat.
- Maggie Smith has never won the award despite being nominated a total of six times. She did receive the Special Olivier Award in 2010.
- Sinéad Cusack has never won the award despite being nominated a total of five times.
- Philip Quast has won the Olivier for Best Actor in a Musical on three occasions, while Michael Crawford, Robert Lindsay, Daniel Evans, Michael Ball and John Dagleish have all won the award twice.
- Imelda Staunton has won the Olivier for Best Actress in a Musical four times. Julia McKenzie, Joanna Riding, Maria Friedman, Samantha Spiro and Katie Brayben have all won twice. Imelda Staunton also holds the record for the most Olivier nominations in the Best Actress in a Musical category, with eight nominations. Maria Friedman is next, with six nominations.
- In 1985, Patti LuPone tied with herself for an Olivier for her performances as Fantine in the original London cast of Les Miserables, and as Moll in The Cradle Will Rock.
- Jenny Galloway and Tracie Bennett have both won the Olivier for Best Supporting Performance in a Musical twice.
- Shows that have won Olivier Awards for both Best Actor and Best Actress in a Musical: Barbara Dickson and Con O'Neill in Blood Brothers (1988), Jonathan Pryce and Lea Salonga in Miss Saigon (1990), Alun Armstrong and Julia McKenzie in Sweeney Todd (1993), Daniel Evans and Samantha Spiro in Merrily We Roll Along (2001), Alex Jennings and Joanna Riding in My Fair Lady (2003), Daniel Evans and Jenna Russell in Sunday in the Park with George (2007), Michael Ball and Leanne Jones in Hairspray (2008), Bertie Carvel and all four Matildas in Matilda (2012) Michael Ball and Imelda Staunton in Sweeney Todd (2013), Eddie Redmayne and Jessie Buckley in Cabaret (2022) and Tom Francis and Nicole Scherzinger in Sunset Boulevard (2024)
- In 2026 All My Sons received nominations for all 4 acting categories for Bryan Cranston, Marianne Jean-Baptiste, Paapa Essiedu and Hayley Squires along with nominations for Best Revival and Best Director for Ivo van Hove
- In 1984, Tim Flavin was the first American actor to win the Olivier Award for his performance in On Your Toes at the Palace Theatre. He was nominated twice in the same year for Most Promising Newcomer and Best Actor in a Musical and the award was presented by Dame Anna Neagle. In 1985, Patti LuPone was the first American actress to win an Olivier award for her work in The Cradle Will Rock and Les Miserables. Jessica Lange was the first American actress nominated for the Olivier Award for Best Actress for her performance in Long Day's Journey into Night
- Hairspray won all three musical acting awards in 2008: Best Actor and Actress in a Musical for Michael Ball and Leanne Jones and Best Supporting Performance in a Musical for Tracie Bennett. Cabaret won all four musical acting awards in 2022: Best Actor and Actress ina Musical for Eddie Redmayne and Jessie Buckley and Best Actor and Actress in a Supporting Role in a Musical for Elliot Levey and Liza Sadovy.
- Roles that have won awards for actors on more than one occasion include: Miss Adelaide in Guys and Dolls (1982 and 2006), George in Sunday in the Park with George (1991 and 2007), The Baker's Wife in Into the Woods (1991 and 1999), Nicely Nicely Johnson in Guys and Dolls (1982 and 1997), Sweeney Todd in Sweeney Todd (1980, 1994 and 2013), Mrs. Lovett in Sweeney Todd (1994 and 2013), Frau Schneider in Cabaret (1994 and 2007) and Eliza Doolittle in My Fair Lady (2002 and 2003).
- Michael Ball, Bertie Carvel and Jak Malone all won Oliviers for playing roles of the opposite sex, in 2008 for Hairspray, 2012 for Matilda, and 2024 for Operation Mincemeat respectively.
- Shared wins: In 2022, all seven actors sharing the role of the Tiger in Life of Pi received the Olivier for Best Actor in a Supporting Role. In 2012, all four actresses sharing the role of Matilda in Matilda the Musical received the Olivier for Best Actress in a Musical. In 2006, all three actors sharing the role of Billy Elliot in Billy Elliot the Musical received the Olivier for Best Actor in a Musical. In 2026, James Hameed and Arti Shah, who shared the role of Paddington in Paddington the Musical, received the Olivier for Best Actor in a Musical.
- Shared nominations: In 2017, the eight members of the cast (six leads and two understudies) of Our Ladies of Perpetual Succour were jointly nominated for Best Actress in a Supporting Role. Also in 2017, the six cast members from The Girls were jointly nominated in the Best Actress in a Musical category. In 2019, the six cast members of Six were jointly nominated for Best Actress in a Supporting Role in a Musical for their performances as the six wives of Henry VIII.
- On 15 April 2012, at age 10 years 299 days, Eleanor Worthington Cox became the youngest winner of an award, when she received the Olivier for Best Actress in a Musical for Matilda the Musical.
- In 2018, Billie Piper became the first, and so far only, actor to have won all six of the currently available UK Theatre Best Actress awards for a single performance: Standard Theatre Awards, WhatsOnStage Awards, Critics' Circle Theatre Awards, Broadway UK Theatre Awards, Glamour Awards and Laurence Olivier Theatre Awards. This accolade was achieved by her performance in Yerma, which was hailed as "the performance of the decade", "shattering, exhausting, earthquaking" and "unbearably harrowing".

== See also ==
- Ian Charleson Awards
- Standard Theatre Awards
- Black British Theatre Awards
- Alfred Fagon Award
- WhatsOnStage Awards
- Tony Awards
- Drama Desk Award
- List of Tony Award- and Olivier Award-winning musicals
