= WhatsOnStage Award for Best Actor in a Play =

British theatre award

WhatsOnStage Award for Best Performer in a Male Identifying Role in a Play
- Awarded for: Excellence in a leading role in a play
- Country: United Kingdom
- Presented by: WhatsOnStage.com
- First award: 2001
- Currently held by: James McAvoy (2022)

The WhatsOnStage Award for Best Performer in a Male Identifying Role in a Play is an annual award presented by WhatsOnStage.com as part of the annual WhatsOnStage Awards. Founded in 2001 as the Theatregoers' Choice Awards, the WhatsOnStage Awards are based on a popular vote recognising performers and productions in London's West End theatre.

This award is given to a person who has performed a leading male identifying role in a play during the eligibility year. Introduced in 2001 as the award for Best Actor in a Play, the category was renamed in 2022 in an effort to be more inclusive. The category was discontinued following the 2022 ceremony and was replaced with the gender-neutral WhatsOnstage Award for Best Performer in a Play.

First presented to Conleth Hill at the inaugural ceremony, Kenneth Branagh, Kevin Spacey and David Tennant are the only actors to have won the award twice.

== Winners and nominees ==
=== 2000s ===
Year	Performer	Play	Male Identifying Character
2001	Conleth Hill	Stones in His Pockets	Charlie Conlon
2002	Alan Rickman	Private Lives	Elyot Chase
2002	Ben Daniels	Tales from Hollywood	Ödön von Horváth
2002	Henry Goodman	Feelgood	Eddie
2002	Jasper Britton	Japes	Michael
2002	Paul Rudd	The Shape of Things	Adam Sorenson
2002	Simon Russell Beale	Humble Boy	Felix Humble
2003
2003	Samuel West	Hamlet	Prince Hamlet
2003	Daniel Craig	A Number	B1 / B2 / Michael Black
2003	Mark Rylance	Twelfth Night	Olivia
2003	Simon Russell Beale	Uncle Vanya / Twelfth Night	Ivan Petrovich Voynitsky / Malvolio
2003	Tom Georgeson	Frozen	Ralph Wantage
2003	Woody Harrelson	On an Average Day	Bob
2004	Kenneth Branagh	Edmond	Edmond Burke
2004	Conleth Hill	Democracy	Gunter Guillaume
2004	Matthew Kelly	Of Mice and Men	Lennie
2004	Michael Sheen	Caligula	Caligula
2004	Ralph Fiennes	Brand	Brand
2004	Tom Hollander	The Hotel in Amsterdam	Laurie
2005
2005	Christian Slater	One Flew Over the Cuckoo's Nest	Randle McMurphy
2005	Ben Whishaw	Hamlet	Prince Hamlet
2005	Jonathan Pryce	The Goat, or Who Is Sylvia?	
2005	Michael Gambon	Endgame	Martin Gray
2005	Richard Griffiths	The History Boys	Douglas Hector
2005	Stanley Townsend	Shining City	John
2006	Kevin Spacey	Richard II	Richard II
2006	Brian Dennehy	Death of a Salesman	Willy Loman
2006	Con O'Neill	Telstar	Joe Meek
2006	Derek Jacobi	Don Carlos	Philip II
2006	Rob Lowe	A Few Good Men	Lieutenant Daniel Kaffee
2006	Simon Russell Beale	The Philanthropist	Philip
2007	Kevin Spacey	A Moon for the Misbegotten	Jim Tyrone
2007	Alan Cumming	Bent	Max
2007	David Haig	Donkeys' Years	Christopher Headingley
2007	Iain Glen	The Crucible	John Proctor
2007	Michael Sheen	Frost/Nixon	David Frost
2007	Frank Langella	Frost/Nixon	Richard Nixon
2007	Rufus Sewell	Rock 'n' Roll	Jan
2008	Ian McKellen	King Lear	King Lear
2008	Charles Dance	Shadowlands	C. S. Lewis
2008	John Simm	Elling	Elling
2008	Paterson Joseph	The Emperor Jones	Brutus Jones
2008	Patrick Stewart	Macbeth	Macbeth
2008	Robert Lindsay	The Entertainer	Archie Rice
2009	Kenneth Branagh	Ivanov	Nikolai Ivanov
2009	Adam Godley	Rain Man	Raymond Babbit
2009	Chiwetel Ejiofor	Othello	Othello
2009	Eddie Redmayne	Now or Later	John Jr.
2009	Ian McDiarmid	Six Characters in Search of an Author	Father
2009	Kevin Spacey	Speed-the-Plow	Charlie Fox
2009	Jeff Goldblum	Speed-the-Plow	Bobby Gould

=== 2010s ===
Year	Performer	Play	Male Identifying Character
2010	Jude Law	Hamlet	Prince Hamlet
2010	David Harewood	The Mountaintop	Martin Luther King Jr.
2010	Dominic West	Life Is a Dream	Segismundo
2010	Ken Stott	A View from the Bridge	Eddie Carbone
2010	Mark Rylance	Jerusalem	Johnny "Rooster" Byron
2010	Samuel West	Enron	Jeffrey Skilling
2011	David Suchet	All My Sons	Joe Keller
2011	Benedict Cumberbatch	After the Dance	David Scott-Fowler
2011	Matthew Macfadyen	Private Lives	Elyot Chase
2011	Rory Kinnear	Hamlet	Prince Hamlet
2011	Simon Russell Beale	Deathtrap	Sidney Bruhl
2011	Toby Stephens	The Real Thing	Henry
2012	James Corden	One Man, Two Guvnors	Francis Henshall
2012	Benedict Cumberbatch	Frankenstein	Victor Frankenstein
2012	Jude Law	Anna Christie	Mat Burke
2012	Kevin Spacey	Richard III	Richard III
2012	David Tennant	Much Ado About Nothing	Benedick
2012	James Earl Jones	Driving Miss Daisy	Hoke Colburn
2013	Rupert Everett	The Judas Kiss	Oscar Wilde
2013	David Haig	The Madness of George III	George III
2013	Adrian Lester	Red Velvet	Ira Aldridge
2013	David Suchet	Long Day's Journey into Night	James Tyrone
2013	Luke Treadaway	The Curious Incident of the Dog in the Night-Time	Christopher Boone
2013	Mark Rylance	Twelfth Night / Richard III	Olivia / Richard III
2014	Daniel Radcliffe	The Cripple of Inishmaan	
2014	Lenny Henry	Fences	Troy Maxson
2014	Rory Kinnear	Othello	Othello
2014	James McAvoy	Macbeth	Macbeth
2014	Ben Whishaw	Peter and Alice	Peter Llewelyn Davies
2015	David Tennant	Richard III	Richard III
2015	Richard Armitage	The Crucible	John Proctor
2015	Tom Bateman	Shakespeare in Love	William Shakespeare
2015	Tom Hiddleston	Coriolanus	Coriolanus
2015	Mark Strong	A View from the Bridge	Eddie Carbone
2016	Benedict Cumberbatch	Hamlet	Prince Hamlet
2016	Bradley Cooper	The Elephant Man	Joseph Merrick
2016	Alex Hassell	Henry V	Henry V
2016	James McAvoy	The Ruling Class	Jack Gurney
2016	Mark Rylance	Farinelli and the King	Philip V
2017	Jamie Parker	Harry Potter and the Cursed Child	Harry Potter
2017	Kenneth Branagh	The Entertainer	Archie Rice
2017	Ralph Fiennes	Richard III	Richard III
2017	Ian Hallard	The Boys in the Band	Michael
2017	Ian McKellen	No Man's Land	Spooner
2018	David Tennant	Don Juan in Soho	Don Juan
2018	Bryan Cranston	Network	Howard Beale
2018	Martin Freeman	Labour of Love	MP David Lyons
2018	Andrew Garfield	Angels in America	Prior Walter
2018	Andrew Scott	Hamlet	Prince Hamlet
2019	Aidan Turner	The Lieutenant of Inishmore	Padraic
2019	Mark Gatiss	The Madness of George III	George III
2019	Arinzé Kene	Misty	Performer
2019	Colin Morgan	Translations	Owen
2019	Kyle Soller	The Inheritance	Eric Glass

=== 2020s ===
Year	Performer	Play	Male Identifying Character
2020	Andrew Scott	Present Laughter	
2020	Tom Hiddleston	Betrayal	Robert
2020	Laurie Kynaston	The Son	Nicolas
2020	Wendell Pierce	Death of a Salesman	Willy Loman
2020	Matt Smith	Lungs	M
2021	Not presented due to impact on theatres of COVID-19 pandemic		
2022
2022	James McAvoy	Cyrano de Bergerac	Cyrano de Bergerac
2022	Richard Armitage	Uncle Vanya	dr Astrov (Mikhail Lvovich Astrov)
2022	Ben Daniels	The Normal Heart	Ned Weeks
2022	Omari Douglas	Constellations	Manuel
2022	Hadley Fraser	2:22 A Ghost Story	Sam
2022	Henry Lewis	Magic Goes Wrong	Mind Mangler

== Multiple wins and nominations ==
=== Wins ===
2 wins

- Kenneth Branagh
- Kevin Spacey
- David Tennant

=== Nominations ===
4 nominations

- Simon Russell Beale
- Mark Rylance
- Kevin Spacey

3 nominations

- Kenneth Branagh
- Benedict Cumberbatch
- James McAvoy
- David Tennant

2 nominations

- Richard Armitage
- Ben Daniels
- Ralph Fiennes
- David Haig
- Tom Hiddleston
- Conleth Hill
- Rory Kinnear
- Ian McKellen
- Andrew Scott
- Michael Sheen
- Samuel West
- Ben Whishaw
