= WhatsOnStage Award for Best Actress in a Play =

British theatre award

WhatsOnStage Award for Best Performer in a Female Identifying Role in a Play
- Awarded for: Excellence in a leading role in a play
- Country: United Kingdom
- Presented by: WhatsOnStage.com
- First award: 2001
- Currently held by: Lily Allen (2022)

The WhatsOnStage Award for Best Performer in a Female Identifying Role in a Play is an annual award presented by WhatsOnStage.com as part of the annual WhatsOnStage Awards. Founded in 2001 as the Theatregoers' Choice Awards, the WhatsOnStage Awards are based on a popular vote recognising performers and productions in London's West End theatre.

This award is given to a person who has performed a leading female identifying role in a play during the eligibility year. Introduced in 2001 as the award for Best Actress in a Play, the category was renamed in 2022 in an effort to be more inclusive. The category was discontinued following the 2022 ceremony and was replaced with the gender-neutral WhatsOnstage Award for Best Performer in a Play.

Kristin Scott Thomas and Billie Piper are the only performers to have won the award twice. Helen McCrory holds the record for most nominations in the category, with five, and also the most nominations without a win.

== Winners and nominees ==
=== 2000s ===
| Year | Performer | Play | Female Identifying Character |
|---|---|---|---|
| 2001 | Julie Walters | All My Sons | Katie Keller |
| 2002 | Victoria Hamilton | A Day in the Death of Joe Egg | Sheila |
| 2002 | Katrin Cartlidge | Boy Gets Girl | Theresa Bedell |
| 2002 | Lindsay Duncan | Mouth to Mouth | Laura |
| 2002 | Fiona Shaw | Medea | Medea |
| 2002 | Rachel Weisz | The Shape of Things | Evelyn Ann Thompson |
| 2002 | Lia Williams | The Homecoming | Ruth |
2003
| 2003 | Gillian Anderson | What The Night Is For | Melinda Metz |
| 2003 | Clare Higgins | Vincent in Brixton | Ursula Loyer |
| 2003 | Gwyneth Paltrow | Proof | Catherine |
| 2003 | Helen McCrory | Uncle Vanya / Twelfth Night | Helena Andreyevna Serebryakova / Olivia |
| 2003 | Judi Dench | The Breath of Life | Frances Beale |
| 2003 | Maggie Smith | The Breath of Life | Madeleine Palmer |
| 2003 | Samantha Bond | Macbeth | Lady Macbeth |
| 2004 | Kristin Scott Thomas | Three Sisters | Maria Sergeyevna Kulygina |
| 2004 | Diana Quick | After Mrs Rochester | Jean Rhys |
| 2004 | Eileen Atkins | Honour | Honour |
| 2004 | Eve Best | Three Sisters / Mourning Becomes Electra | Maria Sergeyevna Kulygina / Lavinia Mannon |
| 2004 | Janet McTeer | The Duchess of Malfi | The Duchess |
| 2004 | Janie Dee | Betrayal | Emma |
2005
| 2005 | Diana Rigg | Suddenly Last Summer | Violet Venable |
| 2005 | Anna Maxwell Martin | His Dark Materials | Lyra Belacqua |
| 2005 | Clare Higgins | Hecuba | Hecuba |
| 2005 | Frances Barber | One Flew Over the Cuckoo's Nest | Nurse Ratched |
| 2005 | Joanna Riding | Blithe Spirit | Ruth Condomine |
| 2005 | Victoria Hamilton | Suddenly Last Summer | Catharine |
| 2006 | Kristin Scott Thomas | As You Desire Me | Elma |
| 2006 | Clare Higgins | Death of a Salesman | Linda Loman |
| 2006 | Helen McCrory | As You Like It | Rosalind |
| 2006 | Harriet Walter | Mary Stuart | Elizabeth I |
| 2006 | Janet McTeer | Mary Stuart | Mary, Queen of Scots |
| 2006 | Sheila Hancock | The Anniversary | Mrs. Taggart |
| 2007 | Judi Dench | Hay Fever | Judith Bliss |
| 2007 | Eve Best | A Moon for the Misbegotten | Josie |
| 2007 | Felicity Kendal | Amy's View | Esme Allen |
| 2007 | Kathleen Turner | Who's Afraid of Virginia Woolf? | Virginia Woolf |
| 2007 | Rosamund Pike | Summer and Smoke | Alma Winemiller |
| 2007 | Sinéad Cusack | Rock 'n' Roll | Eleanor/Esme |
| 2008 | Maggie Smith | The Lady from Dubuque | Jo |
| 2008 | Anne-Marie Duff | Saint Joan | Joan of Arc |
| 2008 | Janie Dee | Shadowlands | Joy Gresham |
| 2008 | Kate Fleetwood | Macbeth | Lady Macbeth |
| 2008 | Kristin Scott Thomas | The Seagull | Irina Arkadina |
| 2008 | Tamsin Greig | Much Ado About Nothing | Beatrice |
| 2009 | Katy Stephens | The Histories | Joan of Arc/Margaret of Anjou |
| 2009 | Deanna Dunagan | August: Osage County | Violet Weston |
| 2009 | Lesley Sharp | Harper Regan | Harper Regan |
| 2009 | Lindsay Duncan | That Face | Martha |
| 2009 | Margaret Tyzack | The Chalk Garden | Mrs. St. Maugham |
| 2009 | Penelope Wilton | The Chalk Garden | Miss Madrigal |

=== 2010s ===
| Year | Performer | Play | Female Identifying Character |
|---|---|---|---|
| 2010 | Rachel Weisz | A Streetcar Named Desire | Blanche DuBois |
| 2010 | Alison Steadman | Enjoy | Connie Craven |
| 2010 | Fiona Shaw | Mother Courage and Her Children | Mother Courage |
| 2010 | Helen Mirren | Phèdre | Phaedra |
| 2010 | Juliet Stevenson | Duet for One | Stephanie |
| 2010 | Lesley Sharp | The Rise and Fall of Little Voice | Mari Hoff |
| 2011 | Zoë Wanamaker | All My Sons | Kate Keller |
| 2011 | Helen McCrory | The Late Middle Classes | Celia Smithers |
| 2011 | Jenny Jules | Ruined | Mama |
| 2011 | Kim Cattrall | Private Lives | Amanda Prynne |
| 2011 | Nancy Carroll | After the Dance | Joan Scott-Fowler |
| 2011 | Tracie Bennett | End of the Rainbow | Judy Garland |
| 2012 | Vanessa Redgrave | Driving Miss Daisy | Daisy Werthan |
| 2012 | Eve Best | Much Ado About Nothing | Beatrice |
| 2012 | Kristin Scott Thomas | Betrayal | Emma |
| 2012 | Ruth Wilson | Anna Christie | Anna Christie |
| 2012 | Samantha Spiro | Chicken Soup with Barley | Sarah Kahn |
| 2012 | Tamsin Greig | Jumpy | Hilary |
| 2013 | Sheridan Smith | Hedda Gabler | Hedda Gabler |
| 2013 | Billie Piper | The Effect | Connie |
| 2013 | Hattie Morahan | A Doll's House | Nora Helmer |
| 2013 | Jill Halfpenny | Abigail's Party | Beverly Moss |
| 2013 | Julie Walters | The Last of the Haussmans | Judy Haussman |
| 2013 | Sally Hawkins | Constellations | Marianne |
| 2014 | Helen Mirren | The Audience | Queen Elizabeth II |
| 2014 | Anne-Marie Duff | Strange Interlude | Nina Leeds |
| 2014 | Hayley Atwell | The Pride | Sylvia |
| 2014 | Suranne Jones | Beautiful Thing | Sandra |
| 2014 | Tanya Moodie | Fences | Rose Maxson |
| 2015 | Billie Piper | Great Britain | Paige Britain |
| 2015 | Gillian Anderson | A Streetcar Named Desire | Blanche DuBois |
| 2015 | Helen McCrory | Medea | Medea |
| 2015 | Imelda Staunton | Good People | Margie Walsh |
| 2015 | Lucy Briggs-Owen | Shakespeare in Love | Viola de Lesseps |
| 2016 | Nicole Kidman | Photograph 51 | Rosalind Franklin |
| 2016 | Rosalie Craig | As You Like It | Rosalind |
| 2016 | Denise Gough | People, Places and Things | Emma |
| 2016 | Harriet Walter | Death of a Salesman | Linda Loman |
| 2016 | Lia Williams | Oresteia | Clytemnestra |
| 2017 | Billie Piper | Yerma | Yerma |
| 2017 | Lily James | Romeo and Juliet | Juliet Capulet |
| 2017 | Pixie Lott | Breakfast at Tiffany's | Holly Golightly |
| 2017 | Helen McCrory | The Deep Blue Sea | Hester Collyer |
| 2017 | Michelle Terry | Henry V | Henry V |
| 2018 | Olivia Colman | Mosquitos | Jenny |
| 2018 | Eve Best | Love In Idleness | Olivia Brown |
| 2018 | Natalie Dormer | Venus in Fur | Vanda von Dunayev |
| 2018 | Tamsin Greig | Labour of Love | Jean Whittaker |
| 2018 | Imelda Staunton | Who's Afraid of Virginia Woolf? | Virginia Woolf |
| 2019 | Sophie Okonedo | Antony and Cleopatra | Cleopatra |
| 2019 | Carey Mulligan | Girls & Boys | Performer |
| 2019 | Charlie Murphy | The Lieutenant of Inishmore | Mairead |
| 2019 | Katherine Parkinson | Home, I'm Darling | Judy |
| 2019 | Patsy Ferran | Summer and Smoke | Alma Winemiller |

=== 2020s ===
| Year | Performer | Play | Female Identifying Character |
|---|---|---|---|
| 2020 | Claire Foy | Lungs | W |
| 2020 | Zawe Ashton | Betrayal | Emma |
| 2020 | Hayley Atwell | Rosmersholm | Rebecca West |
| 2020 | Sharon D. Clarke | Death of a Salesman | Linda Loman |
| 2020 | Juliet Stevenson | The Doctor | The Doctor |
| 2021 | Not presented due to impact on theatres of COVID-19 pandemic | | |
| 2022 | Lily Allen | 2:22 A Ghost Story | Jenny |
| 2022 | Gemma Arterton | Walden | Stella |
| 2022 | Sheila Atim | Constellations | Marianne |
| 2022 | Emma Corrin | Anna X | Anna |
| 2022 | Patsy Ferran | Camp Siegfried | Her |
| 2022 | Saoirse Ronan | The Tragedy of Macbeth | Lady Macbeth |

== Multiple wins and nominations ==
=== Wins ===
2 wins

- Billie Piper
- Kristin Scott Thomas

=== Nominations ===
5 nominations

- Helen McCrory

4 nominations

- Eve Best
- Kristin Scott Thomas

3 nominations

- Tamsin Greig
- Clare Higgins
- Billie Piper

2 nominations

- Gillian Anderson
- Hayley Atwell
- Janie Dee
- Judi Dench
- Anne-Marie Duff
- Lindsay Duncan
- Patsy Ferran
- Victoria Hamilton
- Janet McTeer
- Helen Mirren
- Lesley Sharp
- Fiona Shaw
- Maggie Smith
- Imelda Staunton
- Juliet Stevenson
- Harriet Walter
- Julie Walters
- Rachel Weisz
- Lia Williams
