= WhatsOnStage Award for Best Actor in a Musical =

British theatre award

WhatsOnStage Award for Best Performer in a Male Identifying Role in a Musical
- Awarded for: Excellence in a leading role in a musical
- Country: United Kingdom
- Presented by: WhatsOnStage.com
- First award: 2001
- Currently held by: Eddie Redmayne (2022)

The WhatsOnStage Award for Best Performer in a Male Identifying Role in a Musical is an annual award presented by WhatsOnStage.com as part of the annual WhatsOnStage Awards. Founded in 2001 as the Theatregoers' Choice Awards, the WhatsOnStage Awards are based on a popular vote recognising performers and productions in London's West End theatre.

This award is given to a person who has performed a leading male identifying role in a musical during the eligibility year. Introduced in 2001 as the award for Best Actor in a Musical, the category was renamed in 2022 in an effort to be more inclusive. The category was discontinued following the 2022 ceremony and was replaced with the gender-neutral WhatsOnstage Award for Best Performer in a Musical.

First presented to Daniel Evans at the inaugural ceremony, Michael Ball is the only performer to win the award twice. Julian Ovenden holds the record for most nominations without a win in this category, with four.

== Winners and nominees ==
=== 2000s ===
Year	Performer	Musical	Male Identifying Character
2001	Daniel Evans	Merrily We Roll Along	Charley Kringas
2002	Craig Purnell	Songs for a New World	Man 1
2002	Brent Barrett	Kiss Me, Kate	Fred Graham
2002	Cameron Blakely	Where's Charley?	Charley Wykeham
2002	Paul Keating	Closer to Heaven	Straight Dave
2002	Philip Quast	The Secret Garden	Dr. Neville Craven
2002	Jonathan Pryce	My Fair Lady	Professor Henry Higgins
2003
2003	Tony Vincent	We Will Rock You	Galileo Figaro
2003	Michael Ball	Chitty Chitty Bang Bang	Caractacus Pott
2003	Jarrod Emick	The Full Monty	Jerry Lukowski
2003	Michael Jibson	Our House	Joe Casey
2003	Philip Quast	South Pacific	Emile de Becque
2003	Euan Morton	Taboo	Boy George
2004	John Barrowman	Anything Goes	Billy Crocker
2004	David Bedella	Jerry Springer: The Opera	Jonathan Weiruss/Satan
2004	Graham Bickley	Ragtime	Tateh
2004	Michael Brandon	Jerry Springer: The Opera	Jerry Springer
2004	Adam Cooper	On Your Toes	Junior Dolan
2004	Tim Howar	Tonight's the Night	Stuart Clutterbuck
2005
2005	Nathan Lane	The Producers	Max Bialystock
2005	Desmond Barrit	A Funny Thing Happened on the Way to the Forum	Pseudolus
2005	Martin Crewes	The Woman in White	Walter Hartright
2005	Lee Evans	The Producers	Leo Bloom
2005	Deven May	Bat Boy: The Musical	Bat Boy
2005	Julian Ovenden	Grand Hotel	Baron Felix Von Gaigern
2006	Ewan McGregor	Guys & Dolls	Sky Masterson
2006	Daniel Evans	Sunday in the Park with George	Georges Seurat
2006	Neil Patrick Harris	Tick, Tick... Boom!	Jon
2006	Douglas Hodge	Guys & Dolls	Nathan Detroit
2006	Gavin Lee	Mary Poppins	Bert
2006	James Lomas; George Maguire; Liam Mower	Billy Elliot the Musical	Billy Elliot
2007	Tim Curry	Spamalot	King Arthur
2007	James Dreyfus	Cabaret	The Emcee
2007	Daniel Evans	Sunday in the Park with George	Georges Seurat
2007	Alexander Hanson	The Sound of Music	Georg von Trapp
2007	Philip Quast	Evita	Juan Perón
2007	Clarke Peters	Porgy and Bess	Porgy
2008	Michael Ball	Hairspray	Edna Turnblad
2008	Bertie Carvel	Parade	Leo Frank
2008	Henry Goodman	Fiddler on the Roof	Tevye
2008	Paul Keating	Little Shop of Horrors	Seymour Krelborn
2008	James Loye	Lord of the Rings	Frodo Baggins
2008	Lee Mead	Joseph and the Amazing Technicolor Dreamcoat	Joseph
2009	Ryan Molloy	Jersey Boys	Frankie Valli
2009	Rolan Bell	The Harder They Come	Ivanhoe "Ivan" Martin
2009	Darius Danesh	Gone with the Wind	Rhett Butler
2009	Douglas Hodge	La Cage aux Folles	Albin
2009	Julian Ovenden	Marguerite	Armand
2009	Matt Rawle	Zorro	Zorro

=== 2010s ===
Year	Performer	Musical	Male Identifying Character
2010	Rowan Atkinson	Oliver!	Fagin
2010	Aneurin Barnard	Spring Awakening	Melchior Gabor
2010	Jason Donovan	Priscilla, Queen of the Desert	Anthony "Tick" Belrose
2010	Alexander Hanson	A Little Night Music	Fredrik Egerman
2010	Julian Ovenden	Annie Get Your Gun	Frank Butler
2010	Tony Sheldon	Priscilla, Queen of the Desert	Bernadette Bassenger
2011	Ramin Karimloo	Love Never Dies	The Phantom
2011	Michael Arden	Aspects of Love	Alex Dillingham
2011	Alex Gaumond	Legally Blonde	Emmett Forrest
2011	Sahr Ngaujah	Fela!	Fela Kuti
2011	John Owen-Jones	Les Misérables	Jean Valjean
2011	Mark Umbers	Sweet Charity	Charlie, Vittorio and Oscar
2012	Richard Fleeshman	Ghost	Sam Wheat
2012	Bertie Carvel	Matilda the Musical	Miss Trunchbull
2012	Nigel Lindsay	Shrek The Musical	Shrek
2012	Sean Palmer	Crazy for You	Bobby Child
2012	Reece Shearsmith	Betty Blue Eyes	Gilbert Chilvers
2012	Oliver Tompsett	Rock of Ages	Drew Boley
2013	Michael Ball	Sweeney Todd: The Demon Barber of Fleet Street	Sweeney Todd
2013	Alex Bourne	Kiss Me, Kate	Fred Graham
2013	Tom Chambers	Top Hat	Jerry Travers
2013	Adam Cooper	Singin' in the Rain	Don Lockwood
2013	Lloyd Owen	The Bodyguard	Frank Farmer
2013	Mark Umbers	Merrily We Roll Along	Franklin Shepard
2014	Gavin Creel	The Book of Mormon	Elder Price
2014	Declan Bennett	Once	Guy
2014	Killian Donnelly	The Commitments	Deco
2014	Douglas Hodge	Charlie and the Chocolate Factory	Willy Wonka
2014	Robert Lonsdale	From Here to Eternity	Private Robert E. Lee Prewitt
2015	Jon Jon Briones	Miss Saigon	The Engineer
2015	Alistair Brammer	Miss Saigon	Chris
2015	Killian Donnelly	Memphis	Huey Calhoun
2015	Robert Lindsay	Dirty Rotten Scoundrels	Lawrence Jameson
2015	Marti Pellow	Evita	Che
2016	Matt Henry	Kinky Boots	Lola
2016	Michael Ball	Mack and Mabel	Mack Sennett
2016	Killian Donnelly	Kinky Boots	Charlie Price
2016	Ben Forster	Elf	Buddy
2016	Sam Mackay	In the Heights	Usnavi De La Vega
2017	Charlie Stemp	Half a Sixpence	Arthur Kipps
2017	Michael C. Hall	Lazarus	Thomas Jerome Newton
2017	Ramin Karimloo	Murder Ballad	Tom
2017	Andy Karl	Groundhog Day	Phil Connors
2017	Michael Xavier	Sunset Boulevard	Joe Gillis
2018	John McCrea	Everybody's Talking About Jamie	Jamie New
2018	Hadley Fraser	Young Frankenstein	Frederick Frankenstein
2018	Tom Lister	42nd Street	Julian Marsh
2018	Danny Mac	Sunset Boulevard	Joe Gillis
2018	Andrew Polec	Bat Out of Hell: The Musical	Strat
2019	Jamael Westman	Hamilton	Alexander Hamilton
2019	Kobna Holdbrook-Smith	Tina	Ike Turner
2019	Rob Houchen	Eugenius!	Eugene
2019	Jamie Muscato	Heathers: The Musical	Jason "J.D." Dean
2019	Giles Terera	Hamilton	Aaron Burr

=== 2020s ===
Year	Performer	Musical	Male Identifying Character
2020	Sam Tutty	Dear Evan Hansen	Evan Hansen
2020	David Hunter	Waitress	Dr. Jim Pomatter
2020	Charlie Stemp	Mary Poppins	Bert
2020	Oliver Tompsett	& Juliet	William Shakespeare
2020	Jac Yarrow	Joseph and the Amazing Technicolor Dreamcoat	Joseph
2021	Not presented due to impact on theatres of COVID-19 pandemic		
2022
2022	Eddie Redmayne	Cabaret	Emcee
2022	Roger Bart	Back to the Future: The Musical	Emmett "Doc" Brown
2022	Olly Dobson	Back to the Future: The Musical	Marty McFly
2022	Arinzé Kene	Get Up, Stand Up! The Bob Marley Musical	Bob Marley
2022	Julian Ovenden	South Pacific	Emile de Becque
2022	Ivano Turco	Cinderella	Prince Sebastian

== Multiple wins and nominations ==
=== Wins ===
2 wins

- Michael Ball

=== Nominations ===
4 nominations

- Michael Ball
- Julian Ovenden

3 nominations

- Killian Donnelly
- Daniel Evans
- Douglas Hodge
- Philip Quast

2 nominations

- Bertie Carvel
- Adam Cooper
- Ramin Karimloo
- Paul Keating
- Charlie Stemp
- Oliver Tompsett
- Mark Umbers
