= WhatsOnStage Award for Best Actress in a Musical =

British theatre award

WhatsOnStage Award for Best Performer in a Female Identifying Role in a Musical
- Awarded for: Excellence in a leading role in a musical
- Country: United Kingdom
- Presented by: WhatsOnStage.com
- First award: 2001
- Currently held by: Carrie Hope Fletcher (2022)

The WhatsOnStage Award for Best Performer in a Female Identifying Role in a Musical is an annual award presented by WhatsOnStage.com as part of the annual WhatsOnStage Awards. Founded in 2001 as the Theatregoers' Choice Awards, the WhatsOnStage Awards are based on a popular vote recognising performers and productions in London's West End theatre.

This award is given to a person who has performed a leading female identifying role in a musical during the eligibility year. Introduced in 2001 as the award for Best Actress in a Musical, the category was renamed in 2022 in an effort to be more inclusive. The category was discontinued following the 2022 ceremony and was replaced with the gender-neutral WhatsOnstage Award for Best Performer in a Musical.

First presented to Samantha Spiro at the inaugural ceremony, Carrie Hope Fletcher is the leader in this category after winning three times. Imelda Staunton is the only other performer to win the award multiple times. Fletcher has also received the most nominations in this category, with four.

== Winners and nominees ==
=== 2000s ===
Year	Performer	Musical	Female Identifying Character
2001	Samantha Spiro	Merrily We Roll Along	Mary Flynn
2002	Frances Barber	Closer to Heaven	Billie Trix
2002	Tracie Bennett	Last Song of the Nightingale	Martha
2002	Anita Louise Combe	Hello Again	The Actress
2002	Ruthie Henshall	Peggy Sue Got Married	Peggy Sue
2002	Marin Mazzie	Kiss Me, Kate	Lilli Vanessi/Katharine
2002	Golda Rosheuvel	Songs for a New World	Woman
2003
2003	Hannah Jane Fox	We Will Rock You	Scaramouche
2003	Kathryn Evans	Follies	Sally Durant Plummer
2003	Linzi Hateley	Love Songs	Nellie Forbush
2003	Preeya Kalidas	Bombay Dreams	Priya
2003	Lauren Kennedy	South Pacific	Nellie Forbush
2003	Emma Williams	Chitty Chitty Bang Bang	Truly Scrumptious
2004	Sally Ann Triplett	Anything Goes	Reno Sweeney
2004	Vivienne Carlyle	Joseph and the Amazing Technicolor Dreamcoat	Narrator
2004	Anna Francolini	The Ballad of Little Jo	Josephine Monaghan
2004	Maria Friedman	Ragtime	Mother
2004	Amanda Holden	Thoroughly Modern Millie	Millie Dillmount
2004	Alison Jiear	Jerry Springer: The Opera	Shawntel/Eve
2005
2005	Maria Friedman	The Woman in White	Marian Halcombe
2005	Joanna Francis	Purlie	Lutiebelle
2005	Karen Mann	Sweeney Todd: The Demon Barber of Fleet Street	Mrs. Lovett
2005	Mary Elizabeth Mastrantonio	Grand Hotel	Elizaveta Grushinskaya
2005	Rebecca Vere	Bat Boy: The Musical	Meredith Parker
2005	Leigh Zimmerman	The Producers	Ulla Bloom
2006	Jane Krakowski	Guys and Dolls	Miss Adelaide
2006	Anna-Jane Casey	Sunday in the Park with George	Dot/Marie
2006	Haydn Gwynne	Billy Elliot the Musical	Mrs. Wilkinson
2006	Laura Michelle Kelly	Mary Poppins	Mary Poppins
2006	Jenna Russell	Guys and Dolls	Sister Sarah Brown
2006	Julie Walters	Acorn Antiques: The Musical!	Bo Beaumont
2007	Idina Menzel	Wicked	Elphaba
2007	Connie Fisher	The Sound of Music	Maria Rainer
2007	Tonya Pinkins	Caroline, or Change	Caroline Thibodeaux
2007	Elena Roger	Evita	Eva Perón
2007	Jenna Russell	Sunday in the Park with George	Dot/Marie
2007	Hannah Waddingham	Spamalot	Lady of the Lake
2008	Leanne Jones	Hairspray	Tracy Turnblad
2008	Susan McFadden	Grease	Sandy
2008	Lara Pulver	Parade	Lucille Frank
2008	Sheridan Smith	Little Shop of Horrors	Audrey
2008	Summer Strallen	The Drowsy Chaperone	Janet van de Graaff
2008	Denise van Outen	Rent	Maureen Johnson
2009	Sofia Escobar	West Side Story	Maria
2009	Connie Fisher	They're Playing Our Song	Sonia Walsk
2009	Leila Benn Harris	Imagine This	Rebecca (Tamar)
2009	Ruthie Henshall	Marguerite	Marguerite
2009	Lisa O'Hare	Gigi	Gigi
2009	Elena Roger	Piaf	Edith Piaf

=== 2010s ===
Year	Performer	Musical	Female Identifying Character
2010	Patina Miller	Sister Act	Doloris Van Cartier
2010	Kathryn Evans	Sunset Boulevard	Norma Desmond
2010	Jane Horrocks	Annie Get Your Gun	Annie Oakley
2011	Sheridan Smith	Legally Blonde	Elle Woods
2011	Sierra Boggess	Love Never Dies	Christine Daaé
2011	Anna-Jane Casey	Bells Are Ringing	Ella Peterson
2011	Victoria Hamilton-Barritt	Flashdance	Alex Owens
2011	Tamzin Outhwaite	Sweet Charity	Charity Hope Valentine
2011	Elena Roger	Passion	Fosca
2012	Amanda Holden	Shrek The Musical	Princess Fiona
2012	Cleo Demetriou; Eleanor Worthington Cox; Sophia Kiely; Kerry Ingram	Matilda the Musical	Matilda Wormwood
2012	Clare Foster	Crazy for You	Polly Baker
2012	Sarah Lancashire	Betty Blue Eyes	Joyce Chilvers
2012	Caissie Levy	Ghost	Molly Jensen
2012	Emma Williams	Love Story	Jenny
2013	Imelda Staunton	Sweeney Todd: The Demon Barber of Fleet Street	Mrs. Lovett
2013	Heather Headley	The Bodyguard	Rachel Marron
2013	Megan McGinnis	Daddy Long Legs	Jerusha Abbott
2013	Scarlett Strallen	Singin' in the Rain	Kathy Selden
2013	Hannah Waddingham	Kiss Me, Kate	Lilli Vanessi/Katharine
2013	Emi Wokoma	Soul Sister	Tina Turner
2014	Scarlett Strallen	A Chorus Line	Cassie Ferguson
2014	Rosalie Craig	The Light Princess	Althea
2014	Zrinka Cvitešić	Once	Girl
2014	Cynthia Erivo	The Color Purple	Celie
2014	Charlotte Wakefield	The Sound of Music	Maria Rainer
2015	Eva Noblezada	Miss Saigon	Kim
2015	Madalena Alberto	Evita	Eva Perón
2015	Gemma Arterton	Made in Dagenham	Rita O'Grady
2015	Beverley Knight	Memphis	Felicia Farrell
2015	Jenna Russell	Urinetown	Penelope Pennywise
2016	Imelda Staunton	Gypsy	Rose Thompson Hovick
2016	Katie Brayben	Beautiful: The Carole King Musical	Carole King
2016	Lily Frazer	In the Heights	Nina Rosario
2016	Beverley Knight	Cats	Grizabella
2016	Kimberley Walsh	Elf	Jovie
2017	Amber Riley	Dreamgirls	Effie White
2017	Glenn Close	Sunset Boulevard	Norma Desmond
2017	Carrie Hope Fletcher	Chitty Chitty Bang Bang	Truly Scrumptious
2017	Devon-Elise Johnson	Half a Sixpence	Ann Pornick
2017	Sheridan Smith	Funny Girl	Fanny Brice
2018	Carrie Hope Fletcher	The Addams Family	Wednesday Addams
2018	Christina Bennington	Bat Out of Hell: The Musical	Raven
2018	Janie Dee	Follies	Phyllis Rogers Stone
2018	Ria Jones	Sunset Boulevard	Norma Desmond
2018	Josie Walker	Everybody's Talking About Jamie	Margaret New
2019	Carrie Hope Fletcher	Heathers: The Musical	Veronica Sawyer
2019	Laura Baldwin	Eugenius!	Janey
2019	Rosalie Craig	Company	Bobbie
2019	Rachelle Ann Go	Hamilton	Elizabeth Schuyler Hamilton
2019	Adrienne Warren	Tina	Tina Turner

=== 2020s ===
Year	Performer	Musical	Female Identifying Character
2020	Miriam-Teak Lee	& Juliet	Juliet Capulet
2020	Tracie Bennett	Mame	Mame Dennis
2020	Lucie Jones	Waitress	Jenna Hunterson
2020	Katharine McPhee	Waitress	Jenna Hunterson
2020	Zizi Strallen	Mary Poppins	Mary Poppins
2021	Not presented due to impact on theatres of COVID-19 pandemic		
2022
2022	Carrie Hope Fletcher	Cinderella	Cinderella
2022	Aimie Atkinson	Pretty Woman: The Musical	Vivian Ward
2022	Samantha Barks	Frozen	Elsa
2022	Jessie Buckley	Cabaret	Sally Bowles
2022	Beverley Knight	The Drifters Girl	Faye Treadwell
2022	Steph McKeon	Frozen	Anna

== Multiple wins and nominations ==
=== Wins ===
3 wins

- Carrie Hope Fletcher

2 wins

- Imelda Staunton

=== Nominations ===
4 nominations

- Carrie Hope Fletcher

3 nominations

- Beverley Knight
- Elena Roger
- Jenna Russell
- Sheridan Smith
- Hannah Waddingham

2 nominations

- Tracie Bennett
- Anna-Jane Casey
- Rosalie Craig
- Kathryn Evans
- Connie Fisher
- Maria Friedman
- Ruthie Henshall
- Amanda Holden
- Samantha Spiro
- Imelda Staunton
- Scarlett Strallen
- Emma Williams
