= 2022 WhatsOnStage Awards =

British theatre awards

- Date: 27 February 2022
- Location: Prince of Wales Theatre
- Hosted by: Jodie Prenger and Tom Read Wilson
- Most wins: Frozen (7)
- Most nominations: Frozen (13)

Television/radio coverage
- Network: BBC Radio 2

The WhatsOnStage Awards, founded in 2001 as the Theatregoers' Choice Awards, are a fan-driven set of awards organised by the theatre website WhatsOnStage.com, based on a popular vote recognising performers and productions of English theatre, with an emphasis on London's West End theatre.

The 2022 Whatsonstage Awards, the 22nd, took place on Sunday 27 February at the Prince of Wales Theatre. It was hosted for the third ceremony in a row by theatre star Jodie Prenger and Tom Read Wilson. Due to the COVID-19 pandemic and the resulting shut-down of UK theatres due to lockdowns, the 2021 edition of the show was cancelled and was replaced by an online event which celebrated twenty-one members of the public who had supported the theatre industry during the pandemic, rather than the usual awarding of theatre productions themselves. The 2022 ceremony returns to awarding creative talent involved in West End theatre and is fully voted for by the British theatergoing public, who voted for their winners on WhatsOnStage.com.

The stage adaptation of Disney's blockbuster film Frozen received the most nominations with thirteen, equaling the record set by & Juliet at the 2020 ceremony, while The Tragedy of Macbeth was the most nominated play, with five nods. Due to the large volume of eligible productions, the number of nominations in each category was raised from five to six for the first time. The performance categories were changed to be gender-neutral in an effort to be more inclusive.

== Winners and nominees ==
The nominees for the 22nd WhatsOnStage Awards were announced on 9 December 2021 by James Graham and Gabrielle Brooks in a livestream from The Other Palace.

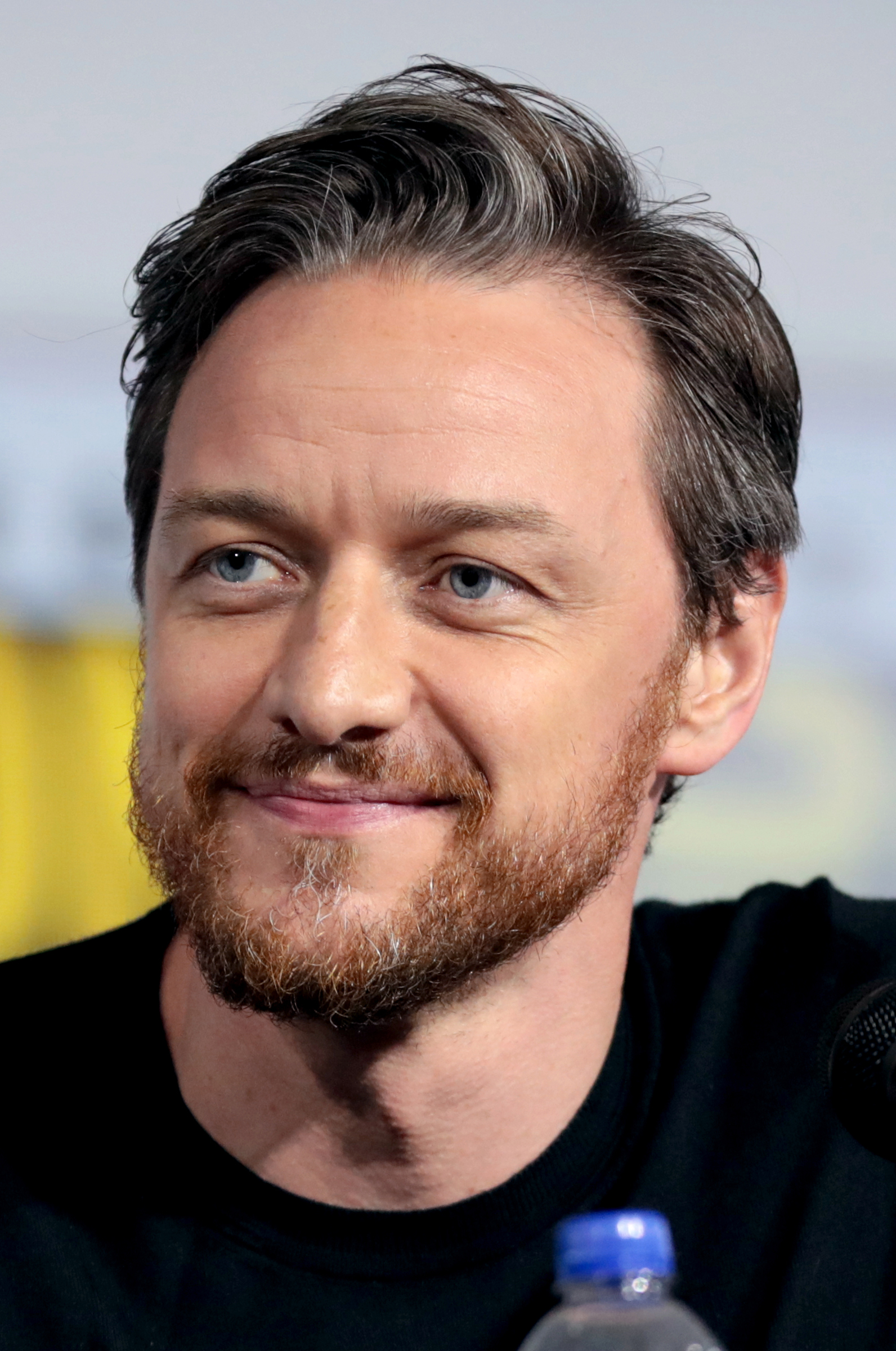
James McAvoy won Best Performer in a Male Identifying Role in a Play.

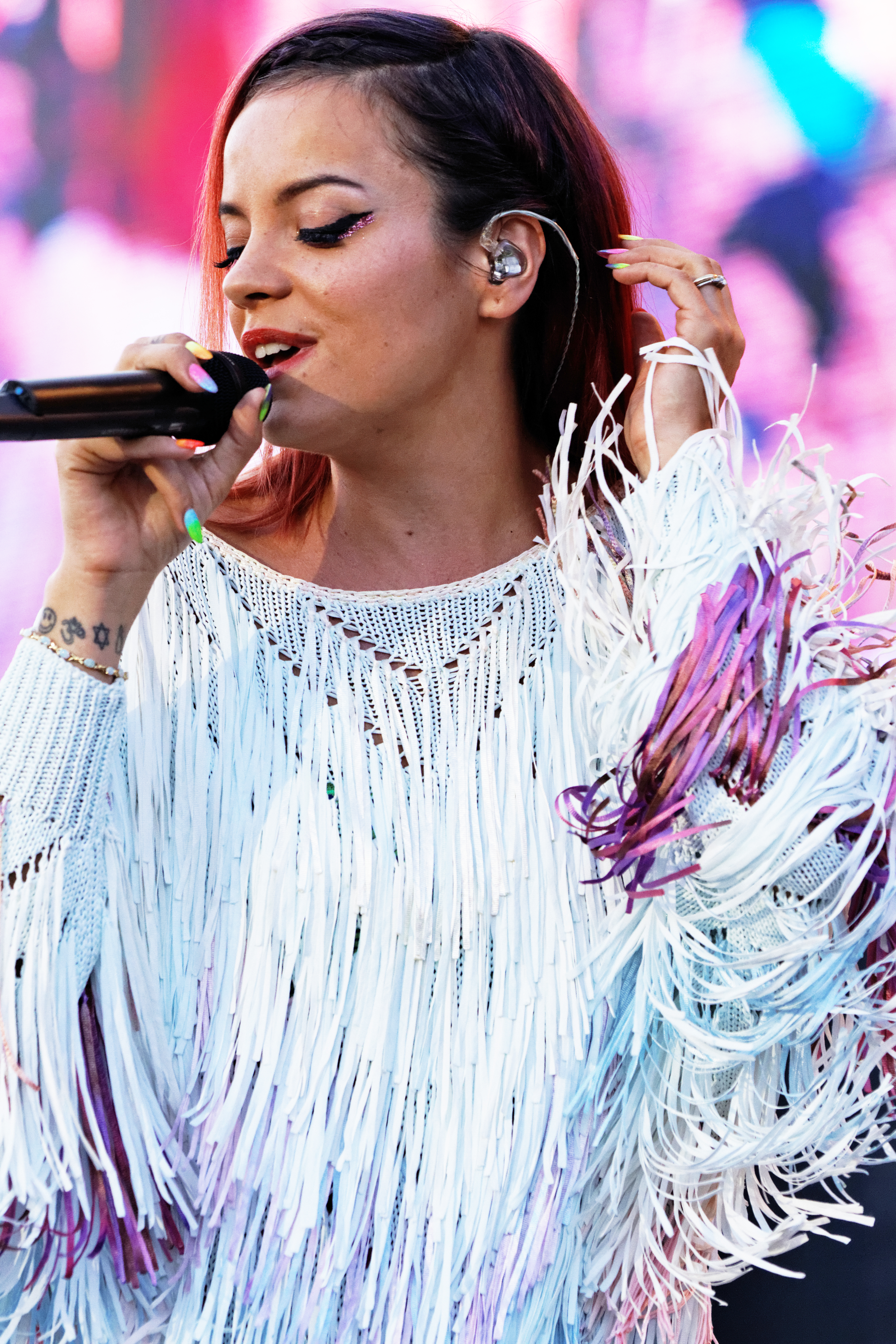
Lily Allen won Best Performer in a Female Identifying Role in a Play.

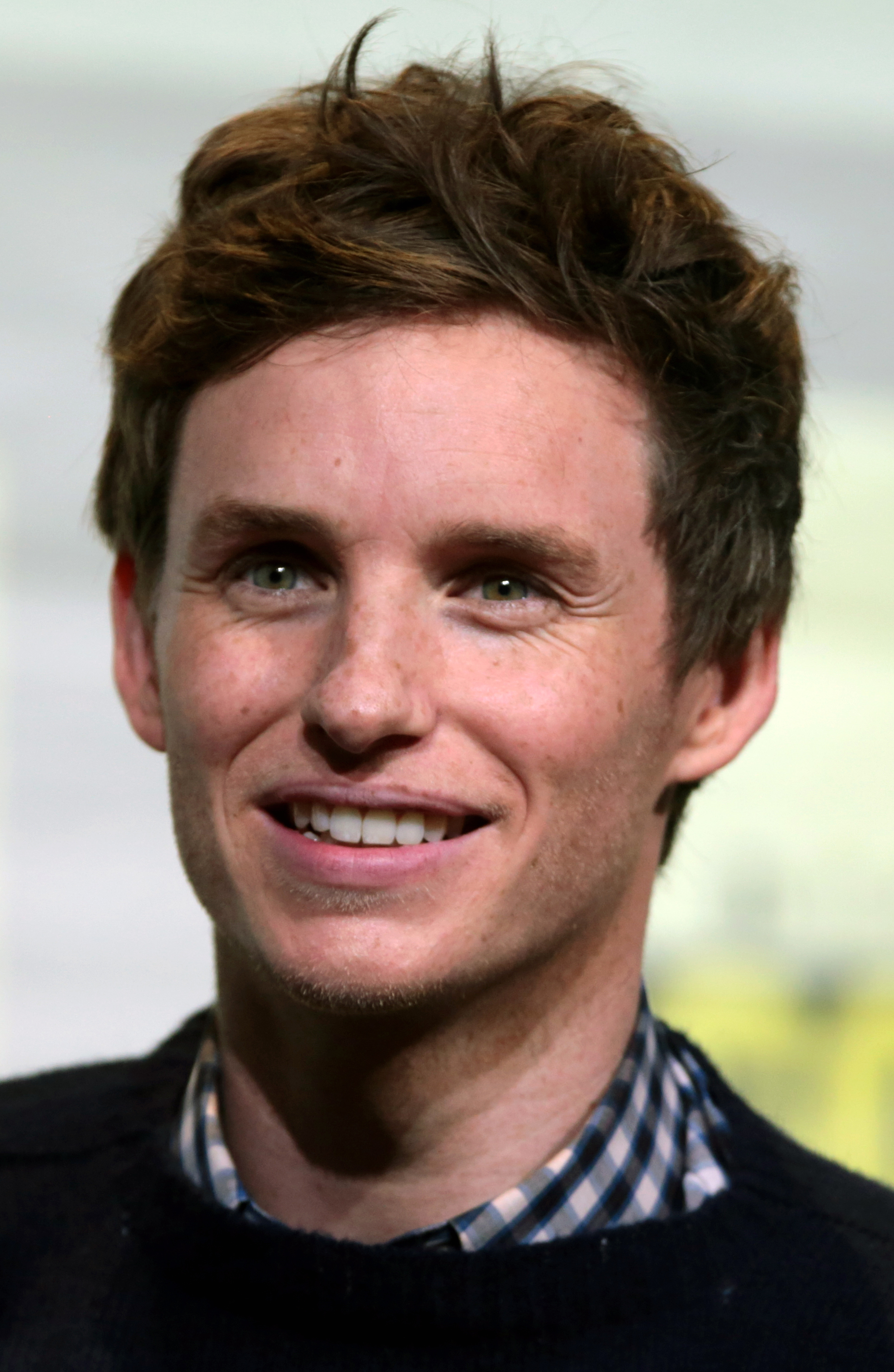
Eddie Redmayne won Best Performer in a Male Identifying Role in a Musical.

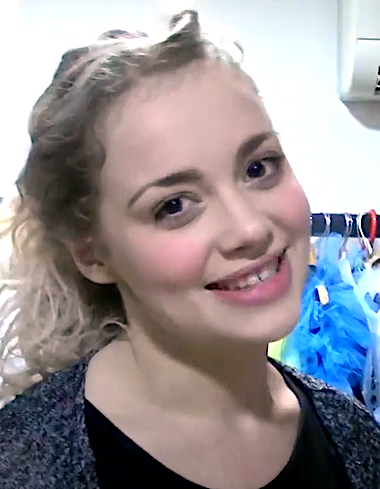
Carrie Hope Fletcher won Best Performer in a Female Identifying Role in a Musical.

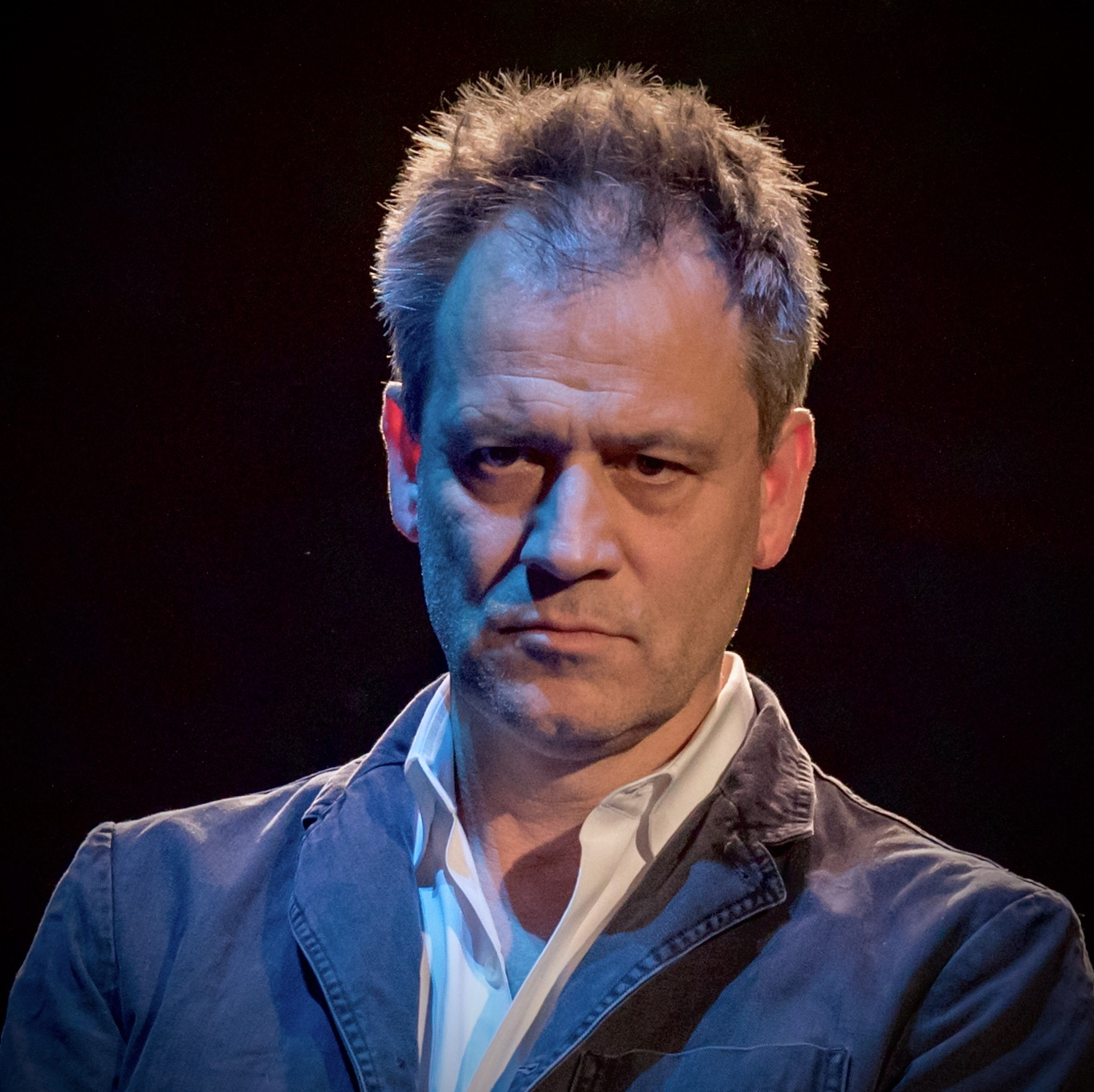
Michael Grandage won Best Direction for Frozen.

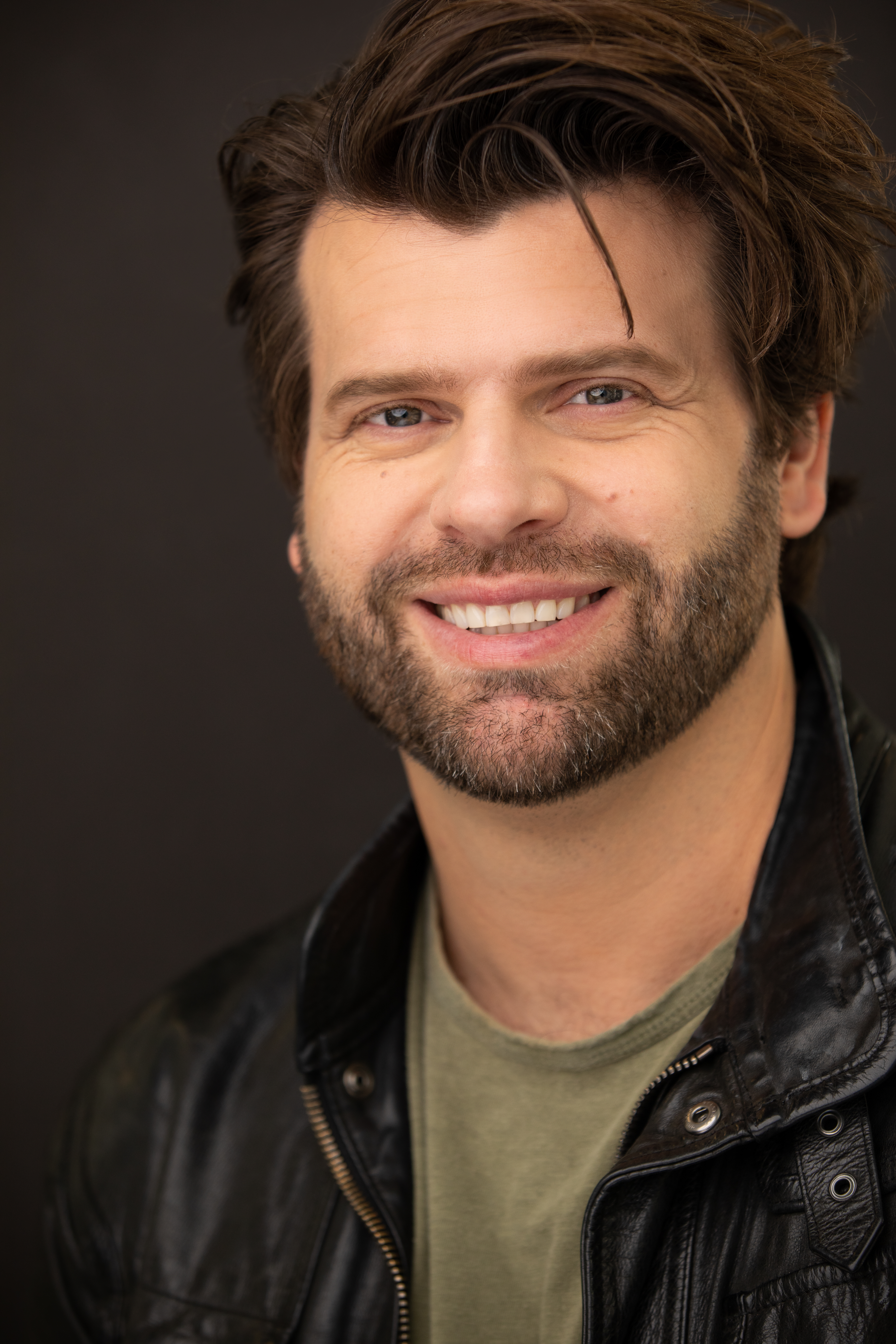
Gareth Owen won Best Sound Design.

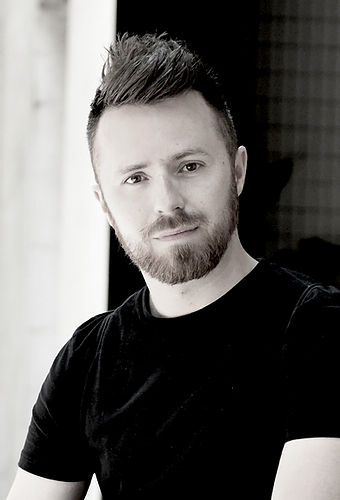
Tim Lutkin won Best Lighting Design.

Best New Play	Best New Musical
2:22 A Ghost Story; J'ouvert; Leopoldstadt; Magic Goes Wrong; Pride and Prejudice* (*sort of); The Ocean at the End of the Lane	Back to the Future: The Musical; Cinderella; Frozen; Get Up, Stand Up! The Bob Marley Musical; Pretty Woman: The Musical; Moulin Rouge!
Best Play Revival	Best Musical Revival
Cyrano de Bergerac; Constellations; My Night with Reg; The Normal Heart; The Tragedy of Macbeth; Uncle Vanya	Anything Goes; Cabaret; Carousel; Rent; South Pacific; West Side Story
Best Performer in a Male Identifying Role in a Play	Best Performer in a Female Identifying Role in a Play
James McAvoy for Cyrano de Bergerac; Richard Armitage for Uncle Vanya; Ben Daniels for The Normal Heart; Omari Douglas for Constellations; Hadley Fraser for 2:22 A Ghost Story; Henry Lewis for Magic Goes Wrong	Lily Allen for 2:22 A Ghost Story; Gemma Arterton for Walden; Sheila Atim for Constellations; Emma Corrin for Anna X; Patsy Ferran for Camp Siegfried; Saoirse Ronan for The Tragedy of Macbeth
Best Performer in a Male Identifying Role in a Musical	Best Performer in a Female Identifying Role in a Musical
Eddie Redmayne for Cabaret; Roger Bart for Back to the Future: The Musical; Olly Dobson for Back to the Future: The Musical; Arinzé Kene for Get Up, Stand Up! The Bob Marley Musical; Julian Ovenden for South Pacific; Ivano Turco for Cinderella	Carrie Hope Fletcher for Cinderella; Aimie Atkinson for Pretty Woman: The Musical; Samantha Barks for Frozen; Jessie Buckley for Cabaret; Beverley Knight for The Drifters Girl; Stephanie McKeon for Frozen
Best Supporting Performer in a Male Identifying Role in a Play	Best Supporting Performer in a Female Identifying Role in a Play
Jake Wood for 2:22 A Ghost Story; Stephen K. Amos for My Night with Reg; Dino Fetscher for The Normal Heart; Nathaniel Parker for The Mirror and the Light; Richard Rankin for The Tragedy of Macbeth; Jonathan Sayer for Magic Goes Wrong	Akiya Henry for The Tragedy of Macbeth; Michelle Fox for Shining City; Penny Layden for The Ocean at the End of the Lane; Isobel McArthur for Pride and Prejudice* (*sort of); Nancy Zamit for Magic Goes Wrong
Best Supporting Performer in a Male Identifying Role in a Musical	Best Supporting Performer in a Female Identifying Role in a Musical
Hugh Coles for Back to the Future: The Musical; Blake Patrick Anderson for Be More Chill; Robert Lindsay for Anything Goes; Cedric Neal for Back to the Future: The Musical; Oliver Ormson for Frozen; Obioma Ugoala for Frozen	Carly Mercedes Dyer for Anything Goes; Joanna Ampil for South Pacific; Gabrielle Brooks for Get Up, Stand Up! The Bob Marley Musical; Victoria Hamilton-Barritt for Cinderella; Millie O'Connell for Rent; Rebecca Trehearn for Cinderella
Best Direction	Best Musical Direction
Michael Grandage for Frozen; Clint Deyer for Get Up, Stand Up! The Bob Marley Musical; Yaël Farber for The Tragedy of Macbeth; Rebecca Frecknall for Cabaret; Jamie Lloyd for Cyrano de Bergerac; Katy Rudd for The Ocean at the End of the Lane	Stephen Oremus for Frozen; Leo Munby for The Last Five Years; Tom Deering for Carousel; Sean Green for Get Up, Stand Up! The Bob Marley Musical; Justin Levine for Moulin Rouge!; Katy Richardson for Rent
Best Choreography	Best Sound Design
Rob Ashford for Frozen; Drew McOnie for Carousel; Kathleen Marshall for Anything Goes; Shelley Maxwell for Get Up, Stand Up! The Bob Marley Musical; Sonya Tayeh for Moulin Rouge!; Ann Yee for South Pacific	Gareth Owen for Back to the Future: The Musical; Adam Cork for Leopoldstadt; Adam Fisher for The Last Five Years; Paul Groothuis for South Pacific; Peter Hylenski for Moulin Rouge!; Ben Ringham and Max Ringham for Cyrano de Bergerac
Best Set Design	Best Costume Design
Christopher Oram for Frozen; Fly Davis and Samuel Wyer for The Ocean at the End of the Lane; Jamie Harrison for Bedknobs and Broomsticks; Tim Hatley for Back to the Future: The Musical; Derek McLane for Moulin Rouge!; Tom Scutt for Cabaret	Christopher Oram for Frozen; Lisa Duncan for Get Up, Stand Up! The Bob Marley Musical; Tom Scutt for Cabaret; Gabriella Slade for Bedknobs and Broomsticks; Gabriela Tylesova for Cinderella; Catherine Zuber for Moulin Rouge!
Best Lighting Design	Best Graphic Design
Tim Lutkin for Back to the Future: The Musical; Neil Austin for Frozen; Charles Balfour for Get Up, Stand Up! The Bob Marley Musical; Isabella Byrd for Cabaret; Bruno Poet for Cinderella; Justin Townsend for Moulin Rouge!	Frozen (Bob King Creative); Get Up, Stand Up! The Bob Marley Musical (Michael Nash Associates); RE:EMERGE Season (Muse Communication); Rent (Feast Creative); Romeo & Juliet (Feast Creative); The Wiz (Christopher D Clegg)
Best Video Design	
Finn Ross for Frozen; Nina Dunn for The Shark is Broken; Akhila Krishnan for What's New Pussycat?; Mikaela Liakata and Tal Yarden for Anna X; Finn Ross for Back to the Future: The Musical; Tal Yarden for Get Up, Stand Up! The Bob Marley Musical
Best Off-West End Production	Best Regional Production
My Son's A Queer (But What Can You Do?); Anything is Possible if You Think About it Hard Enough; Old Bridge; Pippin; Saving Britney; The Last Five Years	Rent; Bedknobs and Broomsticks; Bloody Elle; South Pacific; West Side Story; What's New Pussycat?
Best West End Show
Six; Come from Away; Hamilton; Les Misérables; The Play That Goes Wrong; Wicked

== Productions with multiple wins and nominations ==
=== Multiple wins ===
- 7 wins: Frozen
- 4 wins: Back to the Future: The Musical
- 3 wins: 2:22 A Ghost Story
- 2 wins: Cyrano de Bergerac, Anything Goes

=== Multiple nominations ===
- 13 nominations: Frozen
- 10 nominations: Get Up, Stand Up! The Bob Marley Musical
- 9 nominations: Back to the Future: The Musical
- 7 nominations: Cabaret, Cinderella, Moulin Rouge!
- 6 nominations: Rent, South Pacific, The Tragedy of Macbeth
- 5 nominations: Anything Goes, West Side Story
- 4 nominations: 2:22 A Ghost Story, Magic Goes Wrong, Cyrano de Bergerac, The Ocean at the End of the Lane
- 3 nominations: Bedknobs and Broomsticks, Carousel, Constellations, The Last Five Years, The Normal Heart
- 2 nominations: Anna X, Leopoldstadt, My Night with Reg,Pretty Woman: The Musical,Pride and Prejudice* (*sort of), Uncle Vanya, What's New Pussycat?
