= Passion in the Desert =

- Theatrical poster
- Directed by: Lavinia Currier
- Written by: Lavinia Currier (screenplay); Honoré de Balzac (story); Martin Edmunds (additional script)
- Produced by: Lavinia Currier; Jamil Dehlavi; Stephen Dembitzer; Joel McCleary; Alton Walpole
- Starring: Ben Daniels; Michel Piccoli; Paul Meston; Nadia Odeh
- Cinematography: Aleksei Rodionov
- Edited by: Nicolas Gaster
- Music by: José Nieto
- Distributed by: Fine Line Features
- Release dates: August 31, 1997 (Telluride Film Festival); June 12, 1998 (USA)
- Running time: 93 minutes
- Country: United States
- Language: English
- Box office: Domestic: $250,897

Passion in the Desert, or Simoom: A Passion in the Desert, is a 1997 film from director Lavinia Currier based on the 1830 short story "A Passion in the Desert" by Honoré de Balzac. The film follows the ventures of a young French officer named Augustin Robert (Ben Daniels) in late 18th-century Egypt during Napoleon Bonaparte's campaign to capture the country.

== Plot ==
In 1798, Napoleon I has launched an invasion of Egypt. A frail and elderly artist, Jean-Michel Venture de Paradis (Michel Piccoli), has been commissioned by Napoleon to sketch the landscape and monuments of Egypt. French soldier Augustin Robert (Ben Daniels) has been assigned to keep Venture from being harassed by the other soldiers, but the unrelenting burden of this task soon takes its toll on Augustin. Mameluks attack the regiment's small encampment. In the aftermath, Augustin and Venture are now separated from their regiment. Walking in the arid landscape, under the blaze of the desert sun, they begin to suffer an unquenchable thirst, and Augustin is infuriated when the artist uses the last of their water to mix his paints.

Augustin abandons Venture, who cannot keep up, but promises to return with aid. Venture, unable to believe that Augustin will return, commits suicide. Augustin wanders aimlessly on his own. His thirst compels him to steal water from native Bedouins, frightening a young woman who startles him in her tent. Several Bedouin men give chase in response, and he flees to some nearby caves where he is trapped until a leopard, appearing out of nowhere, slays a Bedouin who is about to kill him.

Augustin is terrified at first, then astonished when the leopard gives him food and leads him to water. Augustin and the leopard, whom he names "Simoom," develop a strange and mysterious relationship, and he begins to mirror her behavior, living in the ruins of a lost city near the caves. Stripping naked, he paints his body with dirt and sand, seeking to resemble her golden-brown fur and its rosette-shaped markings. For a while, they are suspicious and competitive toward each other, but a bond has nevertheless been formed. Augustin finds himself jealous when Simoom goes to mate with another leopard, but she later returns to him.

The bond between Augustin and Simoom is then tested. He saves her from a group of lost French soldiers, who have wandered by and are aiming to kill her for food. Augustin, however, ultimately decides to return to his regiment rather than be branded a deserter or traitor. He dresses again in what is left of his uniform and bicorne and ties Simoon to a pole, but she escapes. Simoom, enraged by his attempted departure, charges and pounces upon him. He is forced to kill the leopard in self-defense.

Wounded by Simoom and suffering intense heat and thirst, Augustin collapses before he is able to find his way back to civilization. On the brink of death, he is rescued by a passing Arab on a camel, and returned to his regiment.

== Production ==
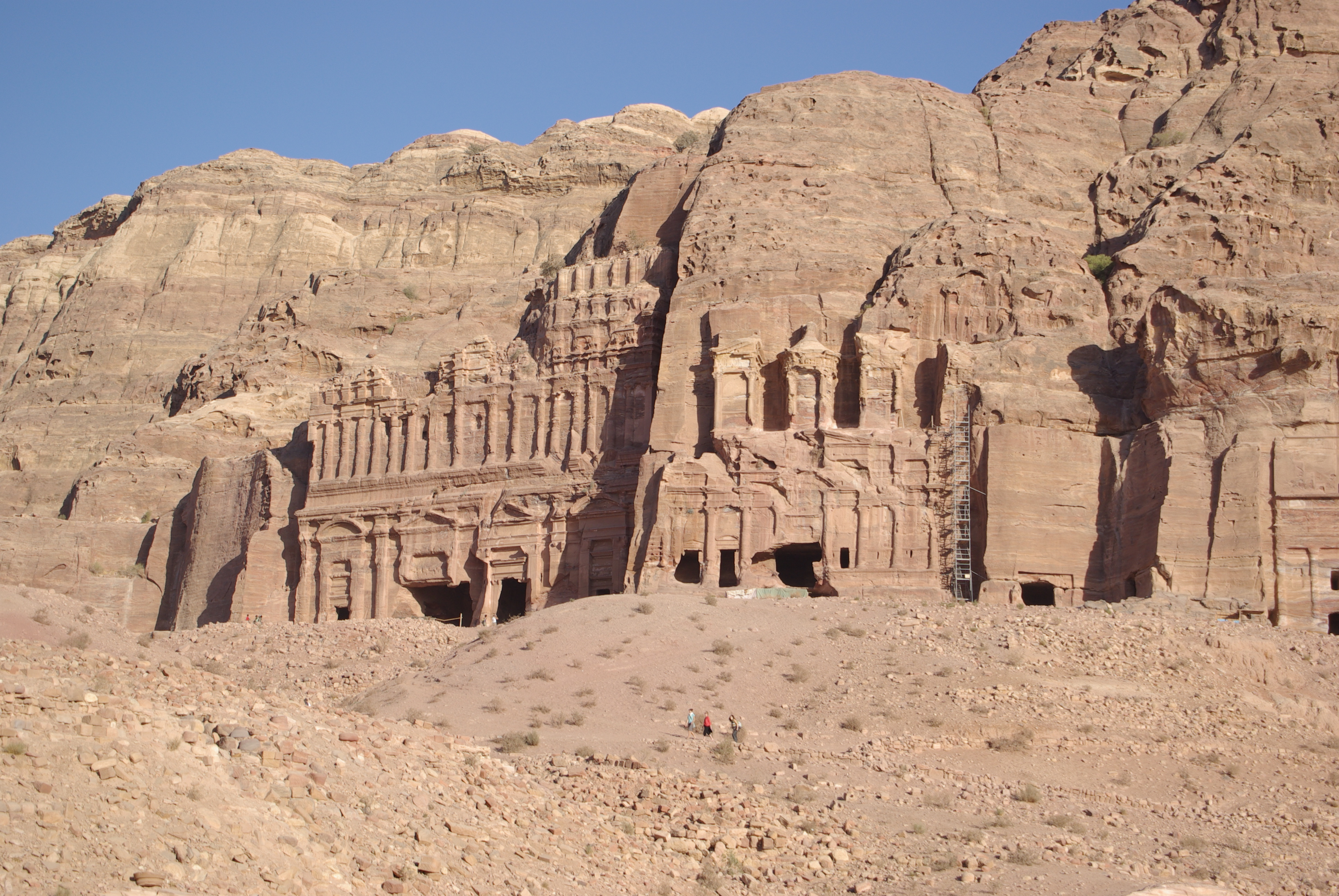
The film was shot in Petra, Jordan.

Filming took place in Jordan and the ruins in Petra. The movie was filmed in April 1 to June 28, 1995. Director Lavinia Currier invested 5 million USD of her own money in addition to writing and producing the film. Currier used animals that were chosen at birth to be raised with enough human interaction, thereby making the process of filming scenes with the leopard much easier. Despite this, there were some close calls during the making of the movie with actor Ben Daniels. Daniels reportedly almost got bitten by the leopard. Prior to filming, Daniels spent time with a Bedouin family out in the Wadi Rum to develop a feel for the environment, something that would assist him in his acting.

== Reception ==
On the review aggregator website Rotten Tomatoes, 74% of 19 critics' reviews are positive.

== Soundtrack ==
The follow-up Passion in the Desert film soundtrack was released in conjunction with the film on June 16, 1998 . Composers José Nieto and Hamza El Din compiled up to 17 tracks altogether. A DVD version of the film was released in December 2005.

Song	Composer
The Lost City	by Jose Nieto
Simoon	by Jose Nieto
Chase Near The Lost City	by Jose Nieto
A Dream	by Jose Nieto
Helalisa	by Hamza El Din
The Shepherd Boy	by Jose Nieto
The Attack Of The Mamelucs	by Jose Nieto
A Night In The Lost City	by Jose Nieto
Avoiding The Beast	by Jose Nieto
Ollin Arageed	by Hamza El Din
The Painter	by Jose Nieto
A Friend	by Jose Nieto
Alone (The Painter's Death)	by Jose Nieto
The Desert	by Jose Nieto
Walking In Circles (Lost In The Desert)	by Jose Nieto
The Leopard (Infidelity)	by Jose Nieto
The End Of A Passion	by Jose Nieto

== See also ==
- French Revolutionary Wars: Campaigns of 1798
