= What's New Pussycat? (musical) =

2021 jukebox musical

- Original production poster
- Music: Various
- Lyrics: Various
- Book: Joe DiPietro
- Basis: The History of Tom Jones, a Foundling by Henry Fielding
- Premiere: 8 October 2021: Birmingham Repertory Theatre
- Productions: 2021 Birmingham

What's New Pussycat? is a jukebox musical with the songs of Welsh singer Sir Tom Jones and a book by Joe DiPietro. It is based on Henry Fielding's 1749 novel The History of Tom Jones, a Foundling with the setting updated to the 1960s London.

== Background ==
In July 2017, it was reported that the musical was in development with Scott Ellis as director with a reading of the musical taking place with Richard Fleeshman as Tom Jones with Hannah Waddingham, Haydn Gwynne, Jason Pennycooke and Amy Lennox in the cast. It was also revealed that Flody Suarez and Ambassador Theatre Group were producing and aiming for a try-out premiere in Wales, before opening in London's West End and eventually Broadway. The musical was eventually due to have its world premiere at the Leeds Playhouse in autumn 2020, however due to the COVID-19 pandemic the run in Leeds was cancelled.

== Production history ==
=== Birmingham (2021) ===
The world premiere production began previews at the Birmingham Repertory Theatre on 8 October (with an official opening night on 19 October) running until 14 November 2021 and is directed by Luke Sheppard with choreography by Arlene Phillips and video design by Akhila Krishnan.

Full casting and creative team was announced on 6 August 2021. On 18 September 2021, members of the company performed songs from the musical at West End LIVE 2021 in Trafalgar Square, London.

== Musical numbers ==
The musical features the songs of Sir Tom Jones, written by various songwriters.

Act I

- "What's New Pussycat? (Burt Bacharach, Hal David) – Mary Western, William Blifil, Lads and Ladies
- "It's Not Unusual" (tease) (Les Reed, Gordon Mills) – Tom Jones
- "Not Responsible" (Gordon Mills) – Tom Jones, Mary Western
- "It's Not Unusual" (Les Reed, Gordon Mills) – Tom Jones, Mods of London
- "Bama Lama Bama Loo" (Little Richard) -Mod Singer, Mods
- "Without Love" (Danny Small) – Mary Western, Servant Girls
- "You Can Leave Your Hat On" (Randy Newman) – Lady Bellaston, Shopgirls
- "Land of a Thousand Dances" (Chris Kenner) – The Girl in the Polka Dot Dress, Mr. Partridge, Tom Jones
- "Thunderball" (John Barry, Don Black) – Lady Bellaston
- "This 'N That" (Gerry Dorsey) – Mr. Partridge, Lonely Blokes
- "Sometimes We Cry" (Van Morrison) – Tom Jones, Mary Western, Mr. Partridge, Lady Bellaston, The Girl in the Polka Dot Dress
- "Chills and Fever" (Billy Gray, Hank Thompson) – Tom, Mods, Mary Western
- "I (Who Have Nothing)" (Carlo Donida, Mogol, Jerry Leiber and Mike Stoller) – Tom Jones

Act II

- "Green, Green Grass of Home" (Curly Putman) – Tom Jones, Prisoners
- "Delilah" (Les Reed, Barry Mason) – Big Mickey, Tom Jones, Prisoners
- "Till" (Charles Danvers, Carl Sigman) – Tom Jones, Mods of London
- "Till" (reprise) (Charles Danvers, Carl Sigman) – Lady Bellaston
- "Whatcha' Gonna Do When Your Baby Leaves You" (Chuck Willis) – Mary Western, Models
- "Mama Told Me Not To Come" (Randy Newman) – Mods of London
- "Sometimes We Cry" (reprise) (Van Morrison) – Mary Western
- "Help Yourself" (Carlo Donida, Jack Fishman) – The Girl in the Polka Dot Dress, Mr. Patridge
- "What's New Pussycat?" (reprise) (Burt Bacharach, Hal David) – Mod Choir
- "Whatcha' Gonna Do When Your Baby Leaves You" (reprise) (Chuck Willis) – Lady Bellaston, William Blifil
- "Give a Little Love" (Iyiola Babtunde Babalola, Kara DioGuardi, Tom Jones, Darren Emilio Lewis) – Mr Partridge, Lord Allworthy, Mrs. Western, The Girl in the Polka Dot Dress
- "Without Love" (reprise) (Danny Small) / "It's Not Unusual" (reprise) (Les Reed, Gordon Mills) – Tom Jones, Mary Western
- "She's a Lady" (Paul Anka) – Tom Jones
- "Green, Green Grass of Home" (reprise) (Curly Putman) – Tom Jones, Company
- "Sex Bomb" (Mousse T. Errol Rennalls) – Company

== Cast and characters ==
Character	Birmingham
Character	2021
Tom Jones	Dominic Andersen
Mary Western	Bronté Barbé
Mr Partridge	Ashley Campbell
Lord Allworthy	Julius D'Silva
The Girl in the Polka Dot Dress	Rebekah Hinds
William Blifil	Harry Kershaw
Lady Bellaston	Kelly Price
Mrs Western	Melanie Walters
Big Mickey	Lemuel Knights
Ensemble	Tom Francis; Naomi Katiyo; David Mairs-McKenzie; Lisa Mathieson; Fallon Mondlane; Jena Pandya; Nathan Rigg; Owen Saward; Carrie Willis
Swing	Alison Driver

== Awards and nominations ==
=== Original Birmingham production ===
Year	Award	Category	Nominee	Result
2022	WhatsOnStage Awards	Best Regional Theatre Production		Nominated
2022	WhatsOnStage Awards	Best Video Design	Akhila Krishnan	Nominated

== Reception ==
The musical was positively reviewed by Arifa Akbar of The Guardian, who gave it four out of five stars and called it a "madcap mashup of a musical". Despite criticising the way the 1960s styling overshadowed Fielding's original novel, leaving some of the more intricate plotting to be glossed over, she ultimately praised the entertaining and amusing nature of the play, writing that "[the] show never quite loses its bubblegum air but distils the scheming spirit of the novel and, just like Tom, reveals its own anarchic spirit to become sheer, high-voltage fun."
