= Ben Daniels =

British actor (born 1964)

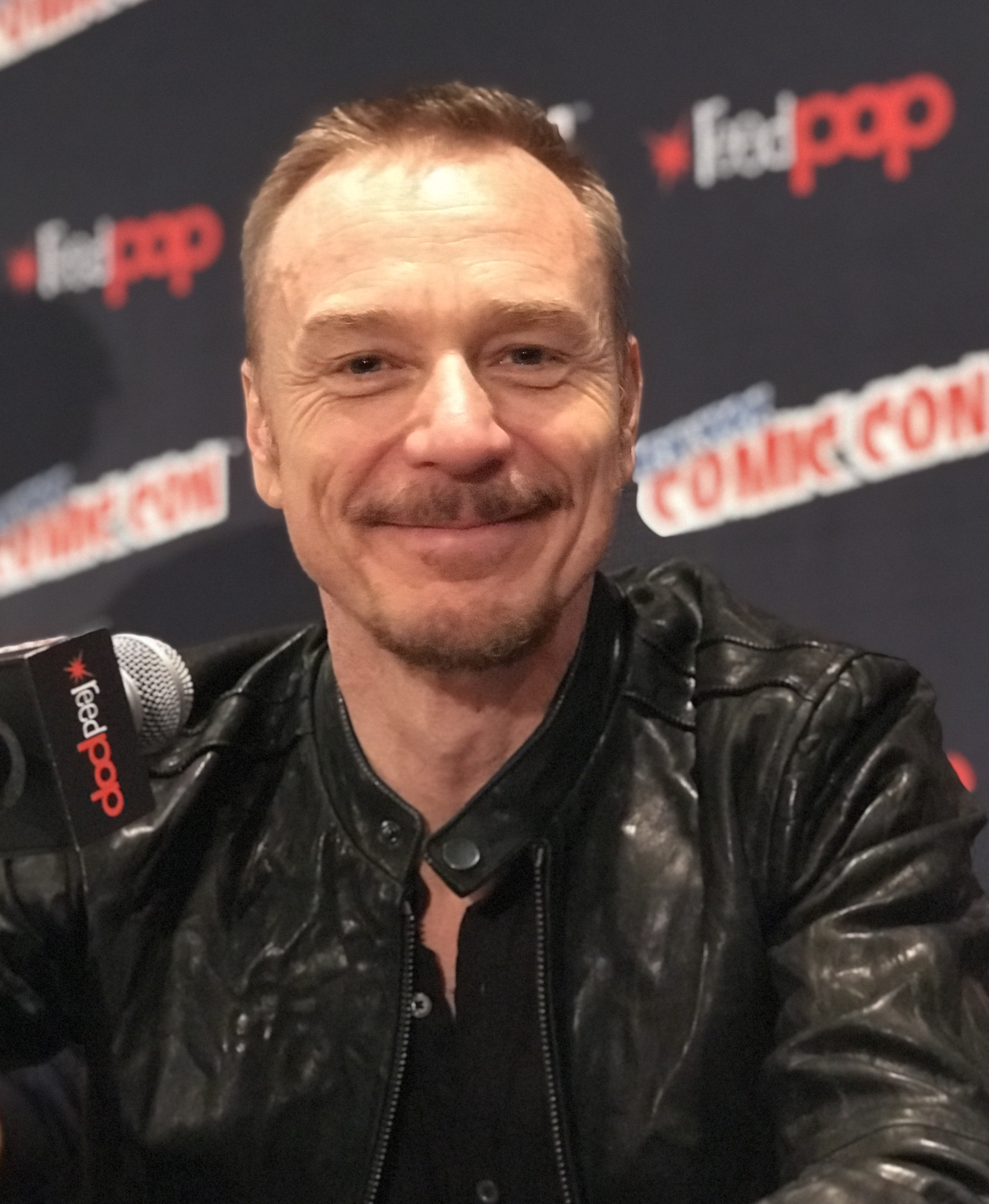
- Daniels at New York Comic Con 2017
- Born: 10 June 1964 (age 62); Nuneaton, Warwickshire, England
- Education: London Academy of Music and Dramatic Art
- Occupation: Actor
- Years active: 1985–present
- Partner: Ian Gelder (1993–2024; his death)

Ben Daniels (born 10 June 1964) is an English actor. Initially a stage actor, Daniels was nominated for an Olivier Award for Best Supporting Actor for Never the Sinner (1991), the Evening Standard Award for Best Actor for 900 Oneonta (1994), Best Actor in the M.E.N. Theatre Awards for Martin Yesterday (1998), and won the 2001 Olivier Award for Best Supporting Actor for his performance in the Arthur Miller play All My Sons.

In 2008, Daniels made his Broadway début in a revival of Les Liaisons Dangereuses, for which he was nominated for the Tony Award for Best Actor in a Play. Daniels has also appeared on popular television series including Cutting It (2002–04), The Virgin Queen (2005), Law & Order: UK (2009–11), The Paradise (2013), House of Cards (2013–14), and The Exorcist (2016–17).

On 1 April 2018 he appeared in the NBC live televised concert rendition of Andrew Lloyd Webber and Tim Rice's rock opera Jesus Christ Superstar as Pontius Pilate. Daniels played Antony Armstrong-Jones, 1st Earl of Snowdon in the third season of Netflix series The Crown. Daniels starred in the role of Walter Sampson in the Netflix superhero series, Jupiter's Legacy.

In 2023 he played the character of General Bel Riose in the Apple TV+ science fiction series Foundation.

== Early life ==
Daniels was born on 10 June 1964 in Nuneaton, Warwickshire. His father was an engineer at Rolls-Royce and later a grocer, while his mother owned a children's clothes shop. He has recalled: "I was quite a shy child, but quite disruptive as well. I was very sneaky and underhanded."

Daniels was educated at Manor Park School, a state comprehensive school in Nuneaton, near Coventry, in Warwickshire (since closed). According to Daniels, drama lessons at O-levels gave him a voice, and when he attended sixth form studies at Stratford College between 1980 and 1982, doing A-levels in theatre studies and English literature, he attended Royal Shakespeare Company performances. A fellow student recalled that Daniels, whom he knew as Dave, "was very serious about his work, and struck me as incredibly intelligent... you got the sense his mind was working; the cogs were ticking over". Daniels subsequently trained at the London Academy of Music and Dramatic Art (LAMDA) for three years.

== Career ==
One of Daniels' earliest roles was as Justin Hayward, the lead singer of the Moody Blues, as a teenager in two of the band's music videos, "Your Wildest Dreams" (1986) and "I Know You're Out There Somewhere" (1988). In 1992, he made an appearance in the infamous plane crash episode "Cascade" of the television show Casualty, playing the co-pilot of the doomed plane. He has taken on parts in many British television dramas, such as Robin in The Lost Language of Cranes (1991), the Biblical character Jonathan in the 1997 Emmy-nominated TV film David, the philandering Finn Bevan in Cutting It (2002–2005), and Nicholas Brocklehurst in the BBC television miniseries The State Within (2006). The latter role was notable for an unexpected same-sex kiss between Daniels' character and another person. In 2008 he appeared in Lark Rise to Candleford, a BBC production based on three semi-autobiographical novels about the English countryside written by Flora Thompson.

Daniels has also played a number of real-life characters, such as German State Secretary Dr. Josef Bühler in Conspiracy, a 2001 dramatisation of the Wannsee Conference at which the Final Solution was endorsed. He also played the author and journalist Ian Fleming, creator of James Bond, in Ian Fleming: Bondmaker (2005), as well as Sir Francis Walsingham in The Virgin Queen (2005) and English writer Saki in Who Killed Mrs De Ropp? (2007). In addition, he has made guest appearances in a number of British TV drama series, including Soldier Soldier (1992), A Touch of Frost (1992), Outside Edge (1994), Spooks (2005), and Merlin (2011). In 2017, Daniels made a guest appearance as a priest in a Treehouse of Horror episode of The Simpsons.

Daniels may be most recognisable to American audiences for appearing in the 1996 film Beautiful Thing. Daniels portrayed Tony, boyfriend of Sandra, the protagonist Jamie's mother. In an independent film directed by Lavinia Currier titled Passion in the Desert (1997), Daniels played a French soldier named Augustin Robert. The film was nominated for a Golden Seashell award. Other feature films that Daniels has starred in are The Bridge (1992), I Want You (1998), Madeline (1998), and Doom (2005). He was offered roles in the 2000 releases The Patriot and Vertical Limit, but turned them down and stated that "the money was good, but it wasn't for me". Daniels had a brief appearance as General Antoc Merrick in the Star Wars film Rogue One: A Star Wars Story.

Daniels has said that he loves acting on stage because "it's tough and keeps you on your toes as an actor". He appeared in All's Well That Ends Well and As You Like It (1999–2000), and played Mercutio in a 1994 TV adaptation of Romeo and Juliet. Other theatre credits include Waiting for Godot (1994) and 900 Oneonta (1994), which earned him a nomination for Best Actor at the Evening Standard Awards. He also acted in Martin Yesterday (1998), for which he was nominated as Best Actor in the Manchester Evening News Theatre Awards, Naked (1998), Tales From Hollywood (2001), Three Sisters (2003), Iphigenia at Aulis (2004), The God of Hell (2005), and The Wild Duck (2005–2006). In 2006, Daniels appeared in Thérèse Raquin as Laurent, for which a reviewer labelled his performance "riveting". On 1 April 2018, Daniels appeared as Pontius Pilate in the NBC live musical, Jesus Christ Superstar Live in Concert!.

Daniels won the Best Supporting Actor award at the Whatsonstage.com Theatregoers' Choice Theatre Awards and the 25th Laurence Olivier Awards in 2001 for his performance in the Arthur Miller play All My Sons. He was first nominated for the latter award earlier in his career, in 1991, for his performance as murderer Richard Loeb in the play Never the Sinner at the Playhouse Theatre. In 2008, Daniels fulfilled a lifetime ambition when he made his Broadway début, headlining as the Vicomte de Valmont in a revival of Les Liaisons Dangereuses. The show opened on 1 May 2008. Daniels was nominated for a Tony Award for Best Performance by a Leading Actor in a Play for his role.

Daniels played a recurring role as prominent photographer Adam Galloway in the Netflix series House of Cards (2013-2014). He played the role of lawyer Rory Murray in the second season of Passenger List, a fictional podcast produced by Radiotopia. He portrays thespian vampire Santiago on the series Interview with the Vampire.

== Personal life ==
Daniels was in a relationship with actor Ian Gelder from 1993 until the latter's death in May 2024. They met during the production of Joe Orton's Entertaining Mr Sloane. The couple resided in South London. Daniels was already sure of his orientation in his teens (he once remarked: "Out? I've never been in") although he did not discuss the matter with his parents because they did not have a very close emotional relationship. He was "cautious about mentioning it when I left drama school, because AIDS was terrifying everyone and there was a huge homophobic backlash". He decided to reveal his homosexuality at the age of 24, while appearing in an all-star benefit performance of Martin Sherman's Bent.

Daniels said in an interview in 2001: "Homophobia is still shockingly prevalent in film and TV. I know I've lost work because of being gay, and it is always an issue. Even on a serious BBC Two drama, there will be some suit in some office going, "Hmmm, isn't he a poof?" I don't consider myself politically gay, but whenever I catch a whiff of that now, I'm on it like a ton of bricks." In 2007, Daniels was ranked number 79 in the annual Pink List of 100 influential gay and lesbian people in Britain published by The Independent on Sunday, down from number 47 in 2006.

In his spare time, he is an amateur painter and a practitioner of Ashtanga yoga. From a young age to his early forties, Daniels suffered from sleep paralysis.

== Film ==
Year	Title	Role	Notes	Ref.
1987	Wish You Were Here	Policeman		
1987	The Fourth Protocol	Uncredited bit part		
1991	The Lost Language of Cranes	Robin		
1992	The Bridge	Rogers		
1993	Rwendo	Marti	Short film	
1996	Beautiful Thing	Tony		
1997	Passion in the Desert	Augustin Robert		
1998	I Want You	DJ Bob		
1998	Madeline	Leopold		
1999	Fanny and Elvis	Andrew		
2000	Britannic	Townsend	TV film	
2001	Married / Unmarried	Danny		
2001	Conspiracy	Dr. Josef Bühler		
2002	Fogbound	Leo		
2005	Doom	Eric "Goat" Fantom		
2013	Jack the Giant Slayer	Fumm		
2014	Locke	Gareth		
2014	Luna	Grant	Filmed in 2007	
2016	The Exception	Colonel Sigurd von Ilsemann	Adaptation of Alan Judd's 2003 novel, The Kaiser's Last Kiss	
2016	Rogue One: A Star Wars Story	General Antoc Merrick		
2019	Captive State	Daniel		
2021	Benediction	W. H. R. Rivers		
2024	Argylle	Bartender	Cameo	

== Television ==
Year	Title	Role	Notes	Ref.
1987	One By One	Student	Episode: "The Elephant and the Kangaroo"	
1988	The Modern World: Ten Great Writers	Hans Castorp	Episode: "Thomas Mann"	
1988	Wall of Tyranny	Streimer		
1988	Scene	Adrian	Episode: "The Crossing"	
1989	The Paradise Club	DC Webster	Episodes: "Family Favours" and "Unfrocked in Babylon"	
1989	Capital City	Colin de Selincourt	Episode: "Max in Trouble"	
1990	Drop the Dead Donkey	Jack Davenport	Episode: "Old Father Time"	
1990	The Fabulous Singlettes	Brian		
1992	Casualty	First Officer Graham Marda	Episode: "Cascade"	
1992	Soldier Soldier	Capt. Andy Wright	Episode: "The Last Post"	
1992	A Touch of Frost	Roger Massie	Episode: "Conclusions"	
1993	The Inspector Alleyn Mysteries	Norman Cubitt	Episode: "Death at the Bar"	
1994	Romeo and Juliet	Mercutio		
1994	Outside Edge	Alex Harrington	5 episodes	
1994	W.S.H.	Kleinman		
1996	Truth or Dare	Ben		
1997	David	Jonathan		
1998	Silent Witness	Owen Johnson	Episode: "Brothers in Arms"	
1999	Aristocrats	Lord Kildare		
2000	Britannic	Townsend		
2002–2004	Cutting It	Finn Bevan	Series 1–3	
2003	Real Men	DI Matthew Fenton		
2004	Agatha Christie's Marple	Alfred Crackenthorpe	Episode: "4.50 to Paddington"	
2005	Ian Fleming: Bondmaker	Ian Fleming		
2005	Spooks	Oleg Korsakov	Episode: "The Russian"	
2005	The Virgin Queen	Francis Walsingham		
2006	The State Within	Nicholas Brocklehurst		
2007	Who Killed Mrs De Ropp?	Saki		
2008	Lark Rise to Candleford	Rushton	1 episode	
2008	The Passion	Caiaphas		
2009–2011	Law & Order: UK	James Steel	Series 1 to 4	
2009	The Last Days of Lehman Brothers	John Thain		
2011	Women in Love	Will Brangwen		
2011	Moving On	John Murphy	Episode: "The Poetry of Silence"	
2011	Merlin	Tristan	"Sword in the Stone", Parts 1 and 2. Acted alongside Miranda Raison who played his love interest, Isolde.	
2013–2014	House of Cards	Adam Galloway	7 episodes	
2013	The Wipers Times	Lt. Colonel Howfield		
2013	The Paradise	Tom Weston	8 episodes	
2014	Kids Who Kill	Narrator	TV documentary	
2014	Jamaica Inn	Francis Davey		
2015	Virtuoso	Emperor Joseph II	TV Pilot	
2015	Casanova	François-Joachim de Bernis	TV Pilot	
2015	Flesh and Bone	Paul Grayson	8 episodes	
2016	The Hollow Crown	Duke of Buckingham	Episodes: "Henry VI, Part Two" & "Richard III"	
2016–2017	The Exorcist	Father Marcus Keane	Nominated – Fangoria Chainsaw Award for Best TV Supporting Actor (2017); Won – Cine Award for Best Actor in a Supporting Role in a Drama Series (2017)	
2017	The Simpsons	Irish Priest	Voice role (as Ben P. Soop Daniels); Segment: "Exor-sis" from "Treehouse of Horror XXVIII"	
2019	The Crown	Antony Armstrong-Jones, 1st Earl of Snowdon	Main role (Season 3); 8 episodes Won – Outstanding Performance by an Ensemble in a Drama Series, 26th Screen Actors Guild Awards	
2021	Jupiter's Legacy	Walter Sampson	Main cast	
2023	Foundation	Bel Riose	Season 2	
2024	Interview with the Vampire	Santiago	Season 2	
2024	The Lord of the Rings: The Rings of Power	Círdan the Shipwright	Season 2	

== Theatre ==
Year(s) of appearance	Performance	Role	Awards and nominations	Ref.
1985	The Brontës of Haworth by Alan Ayckbourn Scarborough, North Yorkshire	James Feather		
1985	Family Circles (1970) by Alan Ayckbourn Scarborough, North Yorkshire	James		
1986	The Winter's Tale (1623) by William Shakespeare Birmingham Repertory Theatre	Florizel		
1986	Something Wicked This Way Comes based on the 1962 novel by Ray Bradbury Everyman Theatre, Liverpool	William Holloway		
1986	The Hypochondriac Leicester	Cleante		
1986	Electra (probably after 413 BC) by Euripides Leicester	Pylades		
1987	Way Out of Order Haymarket, Leicester	Sean		
1987	All's Well That Ends Well (1601–1608) by William Shakespeare Leicester	Bertram		
1988	The Rain Gathering Traverse Theatre, Edinburgh			
1988	The Tutor (1774) by Jakob Michael Reinhold Lenz Old Vic, London	Bollwerk		
1989	Bent (1979) by Martin Sherman One-night benefit for Stonewall at Adelphi Theatre, London	Wolf		
1991	Never the Sinner by John Logan Playhouse Theatre, London	Richard Loeb	Best Supporting Actor, 15th Laurence Olivier Awards (nominated) (1991)	
1991	Pride and Prejudice based on Jane Austen's 1813 book Royal Exchange Theatre, Manchester	George Wickham		
1993	Entertaining Mr Sloane (1964) by Joe Orton Greenwich Theatre, London	Sloane		
1993	Cracks The King's Head Theatre, London	Gideon		
1994	Waiting for Godot (1948–1949) by Samuel Beckett Lyric Theatre, Hammersmith, London	Lucky		
1994, 1999	900 Oneonta by David Beaird Old Vic and Ambassadors Theatre, London; Odyssey Theatre Ensemble, Los Angeles	Tiger	Best Actor, Evening Standard Awards (nominated) (1994)	
1998	Martin Yesterday Royal Exchange Theatre, Manchester	Matt	Best Actor, M.E.N. Theatre Awards (nominated) (1998)	
1998	Naked Almeida Theatre and Playhouse Theatre, London	Franco		
1999–2000	As You Like It (1599 or 1600) by William Shakespeare Crucible Theatre, Sheffield; and Lyric Theatre, Hammersmith, London	Orlando		
2001	All My Sons (1947) by Arthur Miller Cottesloe and Lyttelton Theatres, Royal National Theatre, London	Chris Keller	Best Supporting Actor, 25th Laurence Olivier Awards (2001); Best Supporting Actor, Whatsonstage.com Theatregoers' Choice Theatre Awards (2001)	
2001	Tales from Hollywood (1984) by Christopher Hampton Donmar Warehouse, London	Ödön von Horváth		
2003	Three Sisters (1900) by Anton Chekhov Lyttelton Theatre, Royal National Theatre, London	Lt. Col. Aleksandr Ignatyevich Vershinin		
2004	Iphigenia at Aulis (410 BC) by Euripides, translated by Don Taylor (1990) Lyttelton Theatre, Royal National Theatre, London	Agamemnon		
2005	The God of Hell (2004?) by Sam Shepard Donmar Warehouse, London	Welch		
2005–2006	The Wild Duck (1884) by Henrik Ibsen Donmar Warehouse, London	Gregers Werle		
2006	Thérèse Raquin (1873) by Émile Zola, adapted by Nicholas Wright Lyttelton Theatre, Royal National Theatre, London	Laurent		
2008	Les Liaisons Dangereuses (Dangerous Liaisons) (first produced 1985) by Christopher Hampton American Airlines Theatre, New York City	Vicomte de Valmont	Best Performance by a Leading Actor in a Play, Tony Awards (nominated) (2008).; Recipient, Theatre World Awards (2008).; Best Actor, Outer Critics Circle Awards (nominated) (2008).; Distinguished Performance, Drama League Awards (nominated) (2008).	
2011	Luise Miller (1782–1784) by Friedrich Schiller Donmar Warehouse	The Chancellor		
2011–2012	Haunted Child by Joe Penhall Royal Court Theatre, London	Douglas		
2012	Don't Dress For Dinner (1987) by Marc Camoletti American Airlines Theatre, New York City	Robert		
2018	Jesus Christ Superstar Live in Concert! (1970) by Andrew Lloyd Webber and Tim Rice Marcy Avenue Armory, Williamsburg, Brooklyn	Pontius Pilate	NBC Live Musical: Best Musical Theater Album, Grammy Awards (nominated) (2019).	
2021	The Normal Heart by Larry Kramer (1985) Olivier Theatre, Royal National Theatre, London	Ned Weeks	Best Performer in a Male Identifying Role in a Play, WhatsOnStage Awards (Nominated) (2022).; Best Actor, Laurence Olivier Awards (Nominated) (2022).; Best Actor, Critics Circle Theatre Awards (Won) (2022).	
2023	Medea by Euripides (431 BC) @SohoPlaceTheatre, London	Jason/Creon/Aegeus		

== Awards and nominations ==
Year	Award	Category	Work	Result	Ref.
1991	Laurence Olivier Award	Best Actor in a Supporting Role	Never the Sinner	Nominated	
1994	Evening Standard Theatre Award	Best Actor	900 Oneonta	Nominated	
1998	MEN Theatre Award	Best Actor	Martin Yesterday	Nominated	
2000	TMA Award	Best Supporting Actor	As You Like It	Nominated	
2001	Laurence Olivier Award	Best Actor in a Supporting Role	All My Sons	Won	
2001	WhatsOnStage Award	Best Supporting Actor in a Play	All My Sons	Won	
2008	Tony Award	Best Actor in a Play	Les Liaisons Dangereuses	Nominated	
2008	Drama League Award	Distinguished Performance	Les Liaisons Dangereuses	Nominated	
2008	Outer Critics Circle Award	Best Actor in a Play	Les Liaisons Dangereuses	Nominated	
2008	Theatre World Award		Les Liaisons Dangereuses	Honoree	
2017	Fangoria Chainsaw Award	Best TV Supporting Actor	The Exorcist	Nominated	
2019	Grammy Award	Best Musical Theater Album	Jesus Christ Superstar Live in Concert	Nominated	
2020	Screen Actors Guild Award	Outstanding Performance by an Ensemble in a Drama Series	The Crown	Won	
2022	Laurence Olivier Award	Best Actor	The Normal Heart	Nominated	
2022	Critics' Circle Theatre Award	Best Actor	The Normal Heart	Won	
2022	WhatsOnStage Award	Best Performer in a Male Identifying Role in a Play	The Normal Heart	Nominated	
