= 2:22 A Ghost Story =

2021 play

- Promotional Logo
- Written by: Danny Robins
- Characters: Jenny; Lauren; Sam; Ben
- Genre: Thriller, Ghost story

Premiere
- Date: 3 August 2021
- Place: Noël Coward Theatre, London

2:22 A Ghost Story is a thriller play by Danny Robins. It premiered in the West End in 2021, and received a Laurence Olivier Award nomination for Best New Play the following year.

== Plot ==
Jenny and her husband Sam have recently bought a large house in Greater London that they are renovating. For several nights, at exactly 2:22 am, Jenny hears the sound of someone moving around the house and a man's voice crying, often via the baby monitor in her daughter's bedroom, and becomes convinced the house is haunted. Sam, being a sceptic and having been away on a work trip, insists there are more logical explanations for the noises. The couple hosts a dinner party for Lauren, an old university friend of Sam's, and Ben, her new boyfriend who has a belief in the supernatural. After discussing the strange noises, Jenny persuades the others to stay up until 2:22am to see what happens.

Sam reveals that his work trip was to a rural island where he lost his phone, and was unable to contact Jenny leaving her and daughter Phoebe alone in the house. The two argue, and tensions arise further when she discovers one of Phoebe's toys in the bathroom drenched in white spirit.

Ben suggests a seance to make contact with the spirit asking it to point out the person in the room who is most related to it, which only causes Sam to be further agitated as the table on which they conduct it begins to move towards him abruptly, setting part of the kitchen on fire. Ben, startled by what he saw in the seance, leaves the house in shock. After the commotion, Lauren has a private conversation with Sam where she confesses to having doused Phoebe's toy in spirit in an attempt to prove Sam (and his constant need to provide a scientific explanation for everything) wrong, and also confesses that she loved him back in their university days.

The group are interrupted by a knock at the door, in response to which Sam leaves, and Jenny is greeted by two police officers who inform them that Sam had in fact died on the island, and that before his death he attempted to make one last call to Jenny at exactly 2:22 am. Jenny realises that the voice of the crying man over the baby monitor was in fact Sam's, and that the ghost haunting the house was him.

== Production history ==
Writer Danny Robins in 2024

=== West End (2021–24) ===
On 10 June 2021, it was announced that the play would premiere at the Noël Coward Theatre in London's West End from 3 August running until 16 October 2021. The production was directed by Matthew Dunster, designed by Anna Fleischle, and starred Lily Allen as Jenny, Julia Chan as Lauren, Hadley Fraser as Sam, and Jake Wood as Ben.

The premiere production was nominated for three Laurence Olivier Awards in 2022, including Best New Play and Best Actress for Allen. The show was also nominated for four WhatsOnStage Awards, and won Best New Play, Best Actress for Allen and Best Supporting Actor for Wood.

Following the successful run at the Noël Coward, it was announced the play would transfer to the Gielgud Theatre, running from 4 December 2021 to 12 February 2022. A new cast was announced including Stephanie Beatriz as Lauren, James Buckley as Ben, Elliot Cowan as Sam, and Giovanna Fletcher as Jenny.

A third West End engagement at the Criterion Theatre, from 10 May to 4 September 2022, was announced without a casting confirmation. On 29 March 2022, the new cast was announced, starring Tom Felton as Sam, Mandip Gill as Jenny, Beatriz Romilly as Lauren and Sam Swainsbury as Ben. On 11 August 2022, an extension of the engagement at the Criterion was announced starring Laura Whitmore as Jenny, Felix Scott as Sam, Matt Willis as Ben and Tamsin Carroll as Lauren, running from 6 September to 8 January 2023.

On 7 December 2022, the cast for its fourth West End engagement was announced. Cheryl, Hugo Chegwin, Louise Ford and Scott Karim will be playing at the Lyric Theatre, London from 21 January 2023 to 23 April 2023. On January 24, 2023, it was announced that Hugo Chegwin was forced to withdraw from the show due to having flu during the rehearsal period. Understudy Ben Cutler performed the role for the first four shows before Jake Wood reprised his role as Ben from January 26-April 23, 2023.

On 28 March 2023, a fifth West End production was announced to start at the Apollo Theatre on the 14 May 2023, with Sophia Bush as Lauren, Ricky Champ as Ben, Clifford Samuel as Sam and Jaime Winstone as Jenny. On Friday 21 July it was announced that Sophia Bush had withdrawn from the production for health reasons and that Frankie Bridge will be taking over the role of Lauren from August.

On 19 April 2024, a sixth West End production was announced with Stacey Dooley and James Buckley expected to play Jenny and Ben. The show began performances from 25 May 2024 at the Gielgud Theatre and is scheduled for a limited ten-week summer run. Joe McFadden and Donna Air joined the cast as Lauren and Sam respectively.

=== Los Angeles (2022) ===
The play made its U.S. premiere with a run at the Ahmanson Theatre, Los Angeles from 29 October to 4 December 2022. This production would star Constance Wu as Jenny, Anna Camp as Lauren, Adam Rothenberg as Ben, Finn Wittrock as Sam, and recast the setting to Boston.

=== UK tour (2023–2025) ===
On 10 February 2023, it was announced that the play will embark on a UK tour starting at the Theatre Royal, Bath on 1 September with dates until May 2024. The tour cast includes Joe Absolom as Ben, Charlene Boyd as Lauren, Nathanial Curtis as Sam, and Louisa Lytton as Jenny until 2 December. From 5 January 2024 the cast will feature Vera Chok as Lauren, Jay McGuiness as Ben, George Rainsford as Sam and Fiona Wade as Jenny, with their first performance at Royal and Derngate, Northampton.

=== Australia (2023) ===
On 1 May 2023, an Australian production was announced, opening at Her Majesty's Theatre, Melbourne on 25 July for a four-week season. The cast featured Gemma Ward as Jenny, Ruby Rose as Lauren, Daniel MacPherson as Ben and Remy Hii as Sam.

=== Ireland (2024) ===
The show is running in the Olympia Theatre in Dublin from June to August 2024, starring Shona McGarty, Jay McGuiness, Colin O'Donoghue and Laura Whitmore.

=== Off-Broadway (2026) ===
The production was announced to premiere Off-Broadway with Matthew Dunster set to direct at the Lucille Lortel Theatre in 2026, running from November 5, 2026 to January 17, 2027. The cast features Jasmine Cephas Jones as Jenny, Finn Jones as Sam, Martin Marquez as Ben, and Anna Camp reprising her role as Lauren from the 2022 Los Angeles production.

=== Other productions ===
A non-replica production ran in Singapore from 15 August 2023 to 10 September 2023, at the Singapore Repertory Theatre. It was directed by Daniel Jenkins. The cast consisted of Dominique De Marco, Shane Mardjuki, Sharda Harrison and Andy Tear.

Another non-replica production opened on 8 September 2023 in Prague's The Drama Club, directed by Braňo Holiček. It features Romana Widenková as Jenny, Markéta Stehlíková as Lauren, Václav Šanda as Sam and Jan Hájek as Ben.

== Cast and characters ==
| Character | West End | West End Remount | West End Remount | Los Angeles | West End Remount | West End Remount | Melbourne | UK Tour | West End Remount | UK Tour |
| Character | 2021 | | 2022 | | 2023 | | | | 2024 | 2026 |
|---|---|---|---|---|---|---|---|---|---|---|
| Jenny | Lily Allen | Giovanna Fletcher | Mandip Gill | Constance Wu | Cheryl Tweedy | Jaime Winstone | Gemma Ward | Louisa Lytton | Stacey Dooley | Shvorne Marks |
| Lauren | Julia Chan | Stephanie Beatriz | Beatriz Romilly | Anna Camp | Louise Ford | Sophia Bush | Ruby Rose | Charlene Boyd | Donna Air | Natalie Casey |
| Sam | Hadley Fraser | Elliot Cowan | Tom Felton | Finn Wittrock | Scott Karim | Clifford Samuel | Remy Hii | Nathanial Curtis | Joe McFadden | James Bye |
| Ben | Jake Wood | James Buckley | Sam Swainsbury | Adam Rothenberg | Jake Wood | Ricky Champ | Daniel MacPherson | Joe Absolom | James Buckley | Grant Kilburn |

=== Notable replacements ===
==== Third West End production (2022) ====
- Jenny: Laura Whitmore
- Lauren: Tamsin Carroll
- Sam: Felix Scott
- Ben: Matt Willis

==== Fifth West End production (2023) ====
- Lauren: Frankie Bridge

==== UK tour (2023–2024) ====
- Jenny: Fiona Wade
- Lauren: Vera Chok
- Sam: George Rainsford
- Ben: Jay McGuiness

== Reception and accolades ==
=== Critical response ===
In The Guardian, Kate Wyver wrote, "With a brilliant sense of mounting dread and just the right number of jump-scares, Danny Robins' new ghost story is a slick, chilling romp of a play", adding, "You wouldn't know this is Allen's first time acting in the West End. She is strong as the frantic, afraid and exhausted Jen [...] though it's in her moments of stillness that the fear best finds its way in". She described the cast as "gleaming", noting "Fraser's Sam is so realistic it's hard to believe he's acting", that Wood "revels in [his role of Ben], drawing out the humour and diving into the mysticism", and that "Chan does a brilliant balancing act, shifting Lauren's loyalties throughout the night". Wyver praised Robins' script, finding it "sharp, quick, and cleverly layered with clues. While his handling of horror is nothing new, it's done smartly, toying with the tropes. In one of the most chilling scenes, absolutely nothing happens yet the grand old room is electric with the fear of expectation". She was less impressed with "an overuse of deafening fox screams" and found that "arguments occasionally escalate into one-note yelling" but judged that "neither of these things do much to detract from the steadily growing tension". Overall, she decided, "This show is not scary enough to cause nightmares, nor is it gruesome or graphic or gory; it's more human than the creepiest horror movies. But there are genuinely chilling moments, scary enough that the whole theatre is tense and pin-drop quiet. [...] Scary enough, perhaps, to have you turn on the light the next time you hear an unusual sound at night, just to check the time".

Reviewing the play for The Independent, Annabel Nugent wrote, "Allen is superb as Jenny. Exhaustion thrums a fraction below her palpable fear – just visible enough in her performance to have you questioning Jenny's version of events. And while it may be Allen who everyone has come to see, she isn't bearing the weight alone", adding, "Fraser embodies the role of his condescending character so fully that you come away hating him just a little", noting that "Wood steals scenes as Ben, giving the comedic character punchlines that stick, as well as an unforeseen likeability", and judging that Chan "confidently treads a delicate line in one of the more complicated parts". Nugent also found Robins's script "tight and layered. On-stage action waxes and wanes but the mounting sense of dread is relentless" adding that he "is well-versed in what makes scary stories scarier, and uses that to brilliant effect here" and praising his "adept writing of emotionally charged two-handers, which provide a useful toehold into the characters’ psychological universe". She concluded, "Much more than simply a successful first foray into theatre for one British singer, 2:22 stands on its own merits. Bar a handful of genuinely terrifying moments, it's hardly The Exorcist, but maybe that's for the best. There are enough scary things happening in the world right now to keep us up at night".

=== Awards and nominations ===
| Year | Award | Category | Nominee | Result |
|---|---|---|---|---|
| 2022 | Laurence Olivier Award | Best New Play | | Nominated |
| 2022 | Laurence Olivier Award | Best Actress | Lily Allen | Nominated |
| 2022 | Laurence Olivier Award | Best Sound Design | Ian Dickinson | Nominated |
| 2022 | Whatsonstage Award | Best New Play | | Won |
| 2022 | Whatsonstage Award | Best Performer In A Female Identifying Role In A Play | Lily Allen | Won |
| 2022 | Whatsonstage Award | Best Supporting Performer In A Male Identifying Role In A Play | Jake Wood | Won |
