= 2002 WhatsOnStage Awards =

British theatre awards

The WhatsOnStage Awards, founded in 2001 as the Theatregoers' Choice Awards, are a fan-driven set of awards organised by the theatre website WhatsOnStage.com, based on a popular vote recognising performers and productions of English theatre, with an emphasis on London's West End theatre.

The results of the 2002 Whatsonstage Awards were:

Category	Winner	% of Vote
Best Actress in a Play	Victoria Hamilton for A Day in the Death of Joe Egg (New Ambassadors)	40%
Best Actor in a Play	Alan Rickman for Private Lives (Albery)	64%
Best Supporting Actress in a Play	Gemma Jones for Cat on a Hot Tin Roof (Lyric)	26%
Best Supporting Actor in a Play	Ned Beatty for Cat on a Hot Tin Roof (Lyric)	32%
Best Actress in a Musical	Frances Barber for Closer to Heaven (Arts)	44%
Best Actor in a Musical	Craig Purnell for Songs for a New World (Bridewell)	36%
Best Supporting Performance in a Musical	Craig Purnell for The Secret Garden (Aldwych)	52%
Best Solo Performance	Linda Marlowe in Berkoff's Women (New Ambassadors)	32%
Best Ensemble Performance	The Play What I Wrote (Wyndham's)	29%
Best New Play	Charlotte Jones' Humble Boy (NT Cottesloe)	30%
Best New Comedy	Alistair Beaton's Feelgood (Hampstead/Garrick)	36%
Best New Musical	The Secret Garden (Aldwych)	43%
Best Play Revival	A Day in the Death of Joe Egg (New Ambassadors)	43%
Best Musical Revival	Kiss Me, Kate (Victoria Palace)	52%
Best Shakespearean Production	Love's Labours Lost (Open Air)	43%
Best Director	Howard Davies for Private Lives (Albery)	51%
Best Set Designer	Sue Blane for The Relapse (NT Olivier)	31%
Best Choreographer	Peter Darling for Closer to Heaven (Arts)	54%
London Newcomer of the Year	Emily Blunt for The Royal Family (Haymarket)	35%
Top Turkey of 2001	All You Need is Love (Queen's)	25%

== Nominations in full ==
=== Best Actress in a Play ===
- Victoria Hamilton, A Day in the Death of Joe Egg (New Ambassadors)
- Fiona Shaw, Medea (Queen's)
- Katrin Cartlidge, Boy Gets Girl (Royal Court)
- Lia Williams, The Homecoming (Comedy)
- Lindsay Duncan, Mouth to Mouth (Royal Court/Albery) & Private Lives (Albery)
- Rachel Weisz, The Shape of Things (Almeida at King's Cross)

=== Best Actor in a Play ===
- Alan Rickman, Private Lives (Albery)
- Ben Daniels, Tales from Hollywood (Donmar Warehouse)
- Henry Goodman, Feelgood (Hampstead/Garrick)
- Jasper Britton, Japes (Haymarket)
- Paul Rudd, The Shape of Things (Almeida at King's Cross)
- Simon Russell Beale, Humble Boy (NT Cottesloe)

=== Best Supporting Actress in a Play ===
- Gemma Jones for Cat on a Hot Tin Roof (Lyric)
- Emma Fielding for Private Lives (Albery)
- Julia McKenzie for The Royal Family (Theatre Royal, Haymarket)
- Lucy Punch for Boy Gets Girl (Royal Court)
- Marcia Warren for Humble Boy (NT Cottesloe)
- Marjorie Yates for Star Quality (Apollo)

=== Best Supporting Actor in a Play ===
- Ned Beatty for Cat on a Hot Tin Roof (Lyric)
- Denis Quilley for Humble Boy (NT Cottesloe)
- Eric Sykes for Caught in the Net (Vaudeville)
- Ian Hart for The Homecoming (Comedy)
- Ian McDiarmid for Faith Healer (Almeida)
- Phil Davis for Tales from Hollywood (Donmar Warehouse)

=== Best Actress in a Musical ===
- Frances Barber for Closer to Heaven (Arts)
- Anita-Louise Combe for Hello Again (Bridewell)
- Golda Roshuevel for Songs for a New World (Bridewell)
- Marin Mazzie for Kiss Me, Kate (Victoria Palace)
- Ruthie Henshall for Peggy Sue Got Married (Shaftesbury)
- Tracie Bennett for Last Song of the Nightingale (New End)

=== Best Actor in a Musical ===
- Craig Purnell for Songs for a New World (Bridewell)
- Brent Barrett for Kiss Me, Kate (Victoria Palace)
- Cameron Blakely, Where's Charley? (Open Air, Regent's Park)
- Jonathan Pryce for My Fair Lady (NT Lyttelton/Theatre Royal, Drury Lane)
- Paul Keating for Closer to Heaven (Arts)
- Philip Quast for The Secret Garden (Aldwych)

=== Best Supporting Performance in a Musical ===
- Craig Purnell for The Secret Garden (Aldwych)
- Michael Beresse for Kiss Me, Kate (Victoria Palace)
- Nancy Anderson for Kiss Me, Kate (Victoria Palace)
- Nicholas Le Prevost for My Fair Lady (NT Lyttelton/Theatre Royal, Drury Lane)
- Linzi Hateley for The Secret Garden (Aldwych)
- Gavin Lee for Peggy Sue Got Married (Shaftesbury)

=== Best Solo Performance ===
- Linda Marlowe in Berkoff's Women (New Ambassadors)
- Jackie Mason in The Millennium Show (Queen's)
- Pieter-Dirk Uys in Foreign Aids (Tricycle)
- Thembi Mtshali in A Woman in Waiting (New Ambassadors)
- Debora Weston in See How Beautiful I Am (Bush)

=== Best Ensemble Performance ===
- The Play What I Wrote (Wyndham's)
- Cloudstreet (NT Olivier)
- Jitney (NT Lyttelton)
- Remembrance of Things Past (NT Olivier)
- Tantalus (Barbican Theatre's BITE season)
- The Mill on the Floss (Shared Experience at the New Ambassadors)

=== Best New Play ===
- Charlotte Jones, Humble Boy (NT Cottesloe)
- August Wilson, Jitney (NT Lyttelton)
- Conor McPherson, Port Authority (New Ambassadors)
- Jonathan Harvey, Out in the Open (Hampstead)
- Neil LaBute, The Shape of Things (Almeida at King's Cross)
- Rebecca Gilman, Boy Gets Girl (Royal Court)

=== Best New Comedy ===
- Alistair Beaton, Feelgood (Hampstead/Garrick)
- Ray Cooney, Caught in the Net (Vaudeville)
- The Right Size & Eddie Braben, The Play What I Wrote (Wyndham's)
- The Right Size, Bewilderness (Lyric Hammersmith)

=== Best New Musical ===
- The Secret Garden (Aldwych)
- Closer to Heaven (Arts)
- Hello Again (Bridewell)
- One Touch of Venus (King's Head)
- Shout! (Jermyn Street Theatre)
- Songs for a New World (Bridewell)

=== Best Play Revival ===
- A Day in the Death of Joe Egg (New Ambassadors)
- A Lie of the Mind (Donmar Warehouse)
- A Raisin in the Sun (Young Vic)
- Cat on a Hot Tin Roof (Lyric)
- Private Lives (Albery)
- The Servant (Lyric Hammersmith)

=== Best Musical Revival ===
- Kiss Me, Kate (Victoria Palace)
- Lucky Stiff (Canal Café)
- My Fair Lady (NT Lyttelton/Theatre Royal, Drury Lane)
- Where's Charley? (Open Air, Regent's Park)

=== Best Shakespearean Production ===
- Love's Labours Lost (Open Air)
- A Winter's Tale (NT Olivier)
- ' This England season of History Plays (RSC at Barbican/Young Vic)
- A Midsummer Night's Dream (Albery)
- Cymbeline (Shakespeare's Globe)
- The Tragedy of Hamlet (Young Vic)

=== Best Director ===
- Howard Davies for Private Lives (Albery)
- Ian Rickson for Mouth to Mouth (Royal Court/Albery) & Boy Gets Girl (Royal Court)
- Max Stafford-Clark for Feelgood (Hampstead/Garrick), Sliding with Suzanne (Royal Court) & Rita, Sue & Bob Too / A State Affair (Soho)
- Philip Prowse for Semi-Monde (Lyric)
- Ray Cooney for Caught in the Net (Vaudeville)
- Richard Jones for Six Characters Looking for an Author (Young Vic)

=== Best Set Designer ===
- Sue Blane for The Relapse (NT Olivier)
- Giles Cadle for The Shape of Things (Almeida at King's Cross) & Mother Clap's Molly House (NT Lyttelton)
- Jessica Curtis for Dangerous Corner (Garrick)
- Paul Brown for Platonov (Almeida at King's Cross)
- Tim Hatley for Humble Boy (NT Cottesloe) & Private Lives (Albery)
- Rae Smith for Antarctica (Lyric)

=== Best Choreographer ===
- Peter Darling, Closer to Heaven (Arts)
- Kathleen Marshall, Kiss Me, Kate (Victoria Palace)
- Matthew Bourne, My Fair Lady (NT Lyttelton)
- Todd Twala, Umoja (Shaftesbury)

=== London Newcomer of the Year ===
- Emily Blunt (actress) for The Royal Family (Haymarket)
- Benjamin Davies (actor) in F***ing Games (Royal Court Upstairs)
- Chris Chibnall (playwright) for Kiss Me Like You Mean It (Soho)
- Gregory Burke (playwright) for Gagarin Way (NT Cottesloe)
- Katie Foster-Barnes (actress) in Dangerous Corner (Garrick)
- Laurie Sansom (director) for Dangerous Corner (Garrick)

=== Top Turkey of 2002 ===
- All You Need is Love (Queen's)
- God Only Knows (Vaudeville)
- King Stag (BITE, Barbican)
- Over the Moon (Old Vic)
- Under the Doctor (Comedy)
- Ute Lemper's Naughty Baby (Savoy)
