= 2007 WhatsOnStage Awards =

British theatre awards

The WhatsOnStage Awards, founded in 2001 as the Theatregoers' Choice Awards, are a fan-driven set of awards organised by the theatre website WhatsOnStage.com, based on a popular vote recognising performers and productions of English theatre, with an emphasis on London's West End theatre.

The results of the 2007 Whatsonstage Awards were:

Category	Winner	% of Vote
Best Actress in a Play	Judi Dench - Hay Fever at the Theatre Royal Haymarket	41%
Best Actor in a Play	Kevin Spacey – A Moon for the Misbegotten at the Old Vic	31%
Best Supporting Actress in a Play	Helen Schlesinger – The Crucible, RSC at the Gielgud	29%
Best Supporting Actor in a Play	Colm Meaney – A Moon for the Misbegotten at the Old Vic	33%
Best Actress in a Musical	Idina Menzel – Wicked at the Apollo Victoria	52%
Best Actor in a Musical	Tim Curry – Spamalot at the Palace	39%
Best Supporting Actress in a Musical	Miriam Margolyes – Wicked at the Apollo Victoria	49%
Best Supporting Actor in a Musical	Tom Goodman-Hill – Spamalot at the Palace	30%
Best Solo Performance	Patrick Stewart – A Christmas Carol at the Albery	53%
Best Ensemble Performance	Avenue Q - at the Noël Coward	58%
Best Takeover in a Role	Patrick Swayze – Guys & Dolls at the Piccadilly	22%
The Nick Hern Books Best New Play	Rock 'n' Roll by Tom Stoppard - at the Royal Court & Duke of York's	38%
Best New Comedy	The 39 Steps by Patrick Barlow - at the Tricycle & Criterion	37%
The Superbreak Best New Musical	Wicked - at the Apollo Victoria	51%
Best Play Revival	Who's Afraid of Virginia Woolf? - at the Apollo	27%
The Campo Viejo Best Musical Revival	The Sound of Music - at the London Palladium	27%
The Shakespeare 4 Kidz Best Shakespearean Production	As You Like It - RSC at the Novello	21%
Best Director	Trevor Nunn - Porgy & Bess at the Savoy & Rock 'n' Roll at the Royal Court & Duke of York's	27%
Best Set Designer	Eugene Lee - Wicked at the Apollo Victoria	56%
Best Choreographer	Rob Ashford - Evita at the Adelphi	24%
The Stuart Phillips London Newcomer of the Year	Connie Fisher - The Sound of Music at the London Palladium	46%
Best Off West End Production	Little Shop of Horrors - at the Menier Chocolate Factory	52%
Best Regional Production	Me & My Girl - on tour	32%
The Now Magazine Event of the Year	How Do You Solve a Problem Like Maria? - leading to the first West End star being cast via reality TV	29%
