= 2005 WhatsOnStage Awards =

British theatre awards

The WhatsOnStage Awards, founded in 2001 as the Theatregoers' Choice Awards, are a fan-driven set of awards organised by the theatre website WhatsOnStage.com, based on a popular vote recognising performers and productions of English theatre, with an emphasis on London's West End theatre.

The results of the 2005 Whatsonstage Awards were:

Category	Winner	% of Vote
Best Actress in a Play	Diana Rigg – Suddenly Last Summer at the Albery	23%
Best Actor in a Play	Christian Slater – One Flew Over the Cuckoo’s Nest at the Gielgud	29%
Best Supporting Actress in a Play	Judi Dench – All's Well That Ends Well, RSC at the Gielgud	40%
Best Supporting Actor in a Play	Samuel Barnett – The History Boys at the NT Lyttelton	32%
Best Actress in a Musical	Maria Friedman – The Woman in White at the Palace	32%
Best Actor in a Musical	Nathan Lane – The Producers at the Theatre Royal Drury Lane	32%
Best Supporting Actress in a Musical	Angela Christian – The Woman in White at the Palace	37%
Best Supporting Actor in a Musical	Michael Crawford – The Woman in White at the Palace	37%
Best Solo Performance	Caroline O’Connor – Bombshells at the Arts	26%
Best Ensemble Performance	Sweeney Todd – at Trafalgar Studios & the New Ambassadors	34%
Best Takeover in a Role	Anita Dobson – Thoroughly Modern Millie at the Shaftesbury	37%
Best New Play	Festen, adapted by David Eldridge – at the Almeida & Lyric	27%
Best New Comedy	The History Boys by Alan Bennett – at the NT Lyttelton	43%
Best New Musical	The Producers by Mel Brooks & Thomas Meehan – at the Theatre Royal Drury Lane	43%
The Samuel French Best Play Revival	One Flew Over the Cuckoo’s Nest – at the Gielgud	36%
Best Musical Revival	Sweeney Todd – at Trafalgar Studios & New Ambassadors	33%
Best Shakespearean Production	Hamlet – at the Old Vic	25%
The London Calling Best Director	Trevor Nunn – Hamlet at the Old Vic & The Woman in White at the Palace	33%
Best Set Designer	William Dudley – The Woman in White at the Palace	36%
Best Choreographer	Susan Stroman – The Producers at the Theatre Royal Drury Lane	44%
The MS London Newcomer of the Year	Samuel Barnett – The History Boys at the NT Lyttelton	35%
Best Overall Fringe Production	Fully Committed – at the Menier Chocolate Factory	25%
Best Regional Production	Starlight Express – on tour	35%
The Planet Hollywood Theatre Event of the Year	Nathan Lane’s last-minute replacement of Richard Dreyfuss in The Producers	35%
