= 2016 WhatsOnStage Awards =

British theatre awards

The WhatsOnStage Awards, founded in 2001 as the Theatregoers' Choice Awards, are a fan-driven set of awards organised by the theatre website WhatsOnStage.com, based on a popular vote recognising performers and productions of English theatre, with an emphasis on London's West End theatre.

The 2016 WhatsOnStage Award winners and nominees were:

Best New Play	Best New Musical
Photograph 51; Farinelli and the King; Hangmen; Oppenheimer; People, Places and Things	Kinky Boots; Beautiful: The Carole King Musical; Bend It Like Beckham; Elf; In the Heights
Best Play Revival	Best Musical Revival
Hamlet; Death of a Salesman; Oresteia; The Importance of Being Earnest; The Ruling Class	Gypsy; American Idiot; Cats; High Society; Mack and Mabel
Best Actor in a Play	Best Actress in a Play
Benedict Cumberbatch for Hamlet; Bradley Cooper for The Elephant Man; Alex Hassell for Henry V; James McAvoy for The Ruling Class; Mark Rylance for Farinelli and the King	Nicole Kidman for Photograph 51; Rosalie Craig for As You Like It; Denise Gough for People, Places and Things; Harriet Walter for Death of a Salesman; Lia Williams for Oresteia
Best Actor in a Musical	Best Actress in a Musical
Matt Henry for Kinky Boots; Michael Ball for Mack and Mabel; Killian Donnelly for Kinky Boots; Ben Forster for Elf; Sam Mackay for In the Heights	Imelda Staunton for Gypsy; Katie Brayben for Beautiful: The Carole King Musical; Lily Frazer for In the Heights; Beverley Knight for Cats; Kimberley Walsh for Elf
Best Supporting Actor in a Play	Best Supporting Actress in a Play
Mark Gatiss for Three Days in the Country; Bertie Carvel for Bakkhai; Johnny Flynn for Hangmen; Ciarán Hinds for Hamlet; Kobna Holdbrook-Smith for Hamlet	Judi Dench for The Winter's Tale; Sian Brooke for Hamlet; Imogen Doel for The Importance of Being Earnest; Patsy Ferran for As You Like It; Anastasia Hille for Hamlet
Best Supporting Actor in a Musical	Best Supporting Actress in a Musical
David Bedella for In the Heights; Peter Davison for Gypsy; Jack Edwards for Mack and Mabel; Alexis Gerred for American Idiot; Lucas Rush for American Idiot	Lara Pulver for Gypsy; Jennie Dale for Elf; Victoria Hamilton-Barritt for In the Heights; Amy Lennox for Kinky Boots; Lauren Samuels for Bend It Like Beckham
Best Direction	Best Choreography
Jonathan Kent for Gypsy; Jerry Mitchell for Kinky Boots; Racky Plews for American Idiot; Luke Sheppard for In the Heights; Lyndsey Turner for Hamlet	Jerry Mitchell for Kinky Boots; Drew McOnie for In the Heights; Stephen Mear for Gypsy; Racky Plews for American Idiot; Nathan M Wright for High Society
Best Set Design	Best Lighting Design
Es Devlin for Hamlet; Sara Perks for American Idiot; David Rockwell for Kinky Boots; Takis for In the Heights; Anthony Ward for Gypsy	Jane Cox for Hamlet; Tim Deiling for American Idiot; Mark Henderson for Gypsy; Howard Hudson for In the Heights; Kenneth Posner for Kinky Boots
Best Off-West End Production	Best Regional Production
Carrie; Assassins; Grand Hotel; Shock Treatment; You Won't Succeed on Broadway If You Don't Have Any Jews	Mary Poppins; Anything Goes; Hairspray; Henry V; Mack and Mabel
Best West End Show
Les Misérables; Kinky Boots; Matilda; Miss Saigon; Wicked
Equity Award for Services to Theatre Society Special Award
Kenneth Branagh
