= 2001 WhatsOnStage Awards =

British theatre awards

The WhatsOnStage Awards, founded in 2001 as the Theatregoers' Choice Awards, are a fan-driven set of awards organised by the theatre website WhatsOnStage.com, based on a popular vote recognising performers and productions of English theatre, with an emphasis on London's West End theatre.

The results of the 2001 Whatsonstage Awards were:

Category	Winner	% of Vote
Best Actress	Julie Walters for All My Sons	53%
Best Actor	Conleth Hill for Stones in His Pockets	54%
Best Supporting Actress	Pauline Flanagan for Dolly West's Kitchen	66%
Best Supporting Actor	Ben Daniels for All My Sons	93%
Best New Musical	Merrily We Roll Along	56%
Outstanding Musical Production	The King & I	27%
Best New Play	Dolly West's Kitchen	69%
Best New Comedy	Stones in His Pockets	92%
Best Actor in a Musical	Daniel Evans for Merrily We Roll Along	49%
Best Actress in a Musical	Samantha Spiro for Merrily We Roll Along	55%
Best Supporting Performance in a Musical	Taewon Yi Kim for The King & I	69%
Best Director	Howard Davies for All My Sons	91%
Best Choreographer	Stephen Mear for Singin' in the Rain	48%
Best Set Designer	Bunny Christie for Baby Doll	67%
Best Lighting Designer	Mark Henderson for All My Sons	69%
Best Costume Designer	Gregg Barnes for Pageant	68%
Best New Opera	Pelleas & Melisande by ENO	72%
Outstanding Achievement in Opera	The Kirov's season at the Royal Opera	71%
Best New Dance Production	Indigo Rose by NDT2	72%
Outstanding Achievement in Dance	Matthew Bourne for The Car Man	97%
