= 2004 WhatsOnStage Awards =

British theatre awards

The WhatsOnStage Awards, founded in 2001 as the Theatregoers' Choice Awards, are a fan-driven set of awards organised by the theatre website WhatsOnStage.com, based on a popular vote recognising performers and productions of English theatre, with an emphasis on London's West End theatre.

The results of the 2004 Whatsonstage Awards were:

Category	Winner	% of Vote
Best Actress in a Play	Kristin Scott Thomas - Three Sisters at the Playhouse	28%
Best Actor in a Play	Kenneth Branagh - Edmond at the NT Olivier	38%
Best Supporting Actress in a Play	Nicola Walker - Edmond at the NT Olivier	24%
Best Supporting Actor in a Play	Jim Broadbent - The Pillowman at the NT Cottesloe	31%
Best Actress in a Musical	Sally Ann Triplett - Anything Goes at the NT Olivier & Theatre Royal, Drury Lane	27%
Best Actor in a Musical	John Barrowman - Anything Goes at the NT Olivier & Theatre Royal, Drury Lane	29%
Best Supporting Performance in a Musical	Trevor Jary - Joseph & the Amazing Technicolor Dreamcoat at the New London	24%
Best Solo Performance	Denise Van Outen - Tell Me on a Sunday at the Gielgud	32%
Best Ensemble Performance	A Midsummer Night's Dream - Propeller, Watermill at the Comedy	28%
Best Takeover in a Role	Ruthie Henshall - Chicago at the Adelphi	32%
Best New Play	Hitchcock Blonde by Terry Johnson - at the Royal Court	24%
Best New Comedy	His Girl Friday, adapted by John Guare from The Front Page & the Columbia Pictures film - at the NT Lyttelton	36%
Best New Musical	Jerry Springer - The Opera by Richard Thomas & Stewart Lee - at the NT Lyttelton & Cambridge	43%
Best Play Revival	Edmond - at the NT Olivier	32%
Best Musical Revival	Anything Goes - at the NT Olivier & Theatre Royal, Drury Lane	40%
Best Shakespearean Production	Henry V - at the NT Olivier	26%
Best Director	Trevor Nunn - Anything Goes, Love's Labour's Lost at the NT Olivier & The Lady from the Sea at the Almeida	42%
Best Set Designer	John Gunter - Anything Goes & Love's Labour's Lost at the NT Olivier	39%
Best Choreographer	Stephen Mear - Anything Goes at the NT Olivier & Theatre Royal Drury Lane	33%
London Newcomer of the Year	Benjamin Lake - Jerry Springer - The Opera at the NT Lyttelton & Cambridge	37%
Best Overall Fringe Production	The Lisbon Traviata - at the King's Head	23%
Best Regional Production	The Taming of the Shrew & The Tamer Tamed - RSC at the Royal Shakespeare & Swan Theatres, Stratford	27%
The Planet Hollywood Theatre Event of the Year	The Travelex £10 season at the National Olivier	41%
