= Constellations (play) =

Play written by Nick Payne

- Original language: English
- Written by: Nick Payne
- Characters: Marianne; Roland

Premiere
- Date: January 19, 2012
- Place: Royal Court Theatre Upstairs; London

Constellations is a two-hander play by the British playwright Nick Payne.

== Plot summary ==
The play follows Marianne, a physicist, and Roland, a beekeeper, through their romantic relationship. Marianne often waxes poetic about cosmology, quantum mechanics, string theory and the belief that there are multiple universes that pull people's lives in various directions. This is reflected in the play's structure as brief scenes are repeated, often with different outcomes.

Roland and Marianne meet at a barbecue and become romantically involved. After they've moved in together, a confession of infidelity causes them to break up. After some time, they run in to each other at a ballroom dancing class, resume their relationship, and eventually marry. Marianne begins to forget words and has trouble typing. She is told by her doctor that she has a tumor in her frontal lobe and has less than a year to live. She eventually seeks assisted suicide abroad with Roland's support. The play ends with a flashback to the scene where Roland and Marianne rekindle their relationship in the dance class.

== Productions ==
=== 2012 London premiere ===
Constellations premiered at the Royal Court Theatre in January 2012, with Rafe Spall and Sally Hawkins in the lead roles and direction by Michael Longhurst. The play received strong reviews from critics and subsequently transferred to the Duke of York's Theatre in the West End in November 2012. The reviewer for The Guardian wrote "For all its teasing razzle-dazzle, though, it is the human warmth of the writing and acting that ensures the play never slides into tricksiness."

In November 2012 Constellations was named the winner of the best play category at the Evening Standard Theatre Awards, making the 29-year-old Payne the youngest winner of the award. It also received several nominations at the 2013 Olivier Awards.

=== 2015 Broadway production ===
The play premiered on Broadway in a Manhattan Theatre Club production at the Samuel J. Friedman Theatre on January 13, 2015, and closed on 15 March 2015. The cast starred Jake Gyllenhaal (in his Broadway debut) and Ruth Wilson. Ruth Wilson received a nomination for the 2015 Tony Award, Best Performance By a Leading Actress in a Play. The play received three Drama League Award nominations: Best Play, Best Actor, Gyllenhaal, and Best Actress, Wilson.

=== 2021 West End revival ===
Constellations received a West End revival at the Vaudeville Theatre from June to September 2021, produced by the Donmar Warehouse. The production featured four casts in rotation: Sheila Atim and Ivanno Jeremiah, Peter Capaldi and Zoë Wanamaker, Omari Douglas and Russell Tovey, and Anna Maxwell Martin and Chris O'Dowd. Longhurst returned to direct the play, which was revised by Payne to accommodate Douglas and Tovey as characters Roland and Manuel. The production won the 2022 Olivier Awards for Best Revival and Best Actress for Atim, and received nominations for Best Director for Longhurst and Best Actor for Douglas.

=== Other productions ===
In January 2013 Payne revealed that a film adaptation was under way. That plan has since been shelved.

The play toured the UK, starting in May 2015 at Woking's New Victoria Theatre.

In November 2015, the Chinese-language premiere was directed and translated by Wang Chong in Beijing. He used 13 on stage cameras to conceptualize the play into a "stage movie" with the 50 scenes presented in 50 takes creating a very intimate cinematic experience. A real hamster was also on the stage representing the god of time and universe dictating the cuts of the "movie" and the possibilities of life. Because of the show's success, the actress Wang Xiaohuan was recognised by The Beijing News as The Young Theater Artist of the Year.

A production opened on February 10, 2016, at the Boise Contemporary Theater in Boise, ID, running through March 5, and starring Dwayne Blackaller and Tiara Thompson and directed by Tracy Sunderland.

In 2016 the Canadian English-language premiere was co-produced by Montreal's Centaur Theatre and Toronto’s Canadian Stage Company. The show was directed by legendary Canadian director Peter Hinton-Davis and starred Cara Ricketts and Graham Cuthbertson.

The 2016 Studio Theatre production was nominated for 6 awards at the 2017 Helen Hayes Awards in Washington, D.C. The production won 2 awards, with Tom Patterson receiving the Robert Prosky Award for Outstanding Lead Actor in a Play and Lily Balatincz receiving Outstanding Lead Actress in a Play.

In 2017, the play premiered in Los Angeles at the Geffen Playhouse with Ginnifer Goodwin and Allen Leech and director Giovanna Sardelli.

A regional performance premiered in August 2017 at TheatreWorks Silicon Valley with Robert Gilbert and Carie Kawa and director Robert Kelley.

The play premiered in Perth, Western Australia in June 2018 with Paul Davey and Madelaine Page and directed by Brendan Ellis.

In July 2019, the play premiered in Kyiv, Ukraine with Alina Tunik and Pavlo Aldoshyn, translated and directed by Olga Annenko. Original music by Ivan Kirov, set and costume design by Tatyana Ovsiychuk.

In December 2021, the play was staged by the Owl & Nightingale Players in Gettysburg, Pennsylvania, featuring Casey Creagh as Marianne and Eric Lippe as Roland. Creagh won the Capstone Award awarded by the local Gettysburg College.

In 2022 the Hawaiian premiere was produced by the KOA Theater opening June 17th. The show was directed by Kevin Keaveney and starred Chris Jaymes and Eden Lee.

In November 2022 a production was staged at The Garage, Bangkok by the Bangkok Community Theatre, featuring Nicholas Burnham and Fiona Haque, directed by Danny Wall. The production took place at ‘The Garage’ in Bangkok, Thailand.

In April 2023, a new production of the play, directed by Wesley Henderson Roe, will be presented at Hampton Hill Theatre in Hampton, England, starring Brendan Leddy and Heather Stockwell.

In November 2023, the play was performed in Amsterdam by Downstage Left at the Polanentheater.

In September 2024, the play was performed in Mankato, Minnesota by Minnesota State University, Mankato Theatre and Dance. It was a part of their Studio Season.

In December 2024, the play was performed for three days in Jakarta, Indonesia by an upcoming Theatre Company called Teater Pandora. It coincides with the company's 10th anniversary and their 30th production since their establishment in 2014. In addition, it also includes new offerings in terms of directing, acting, artistic and offstage experience for the audience, including a scene entirely in sign language. "We are committed on making a more accessible space for every community. That's why for this particular play, we also include a sign language translator for the deaf and hard of hearing audience" said Nin Djani, the museum's public program and education curator.

The script is translated and directed by Yoga Mohamad the co-founder of Pandora, originally an actor - writer since his College days. The production is also a continuity of their campaign since 2019, MempermainkanRuang (#PlayingWithSpace) where the company take plays in un conventional places such as cafes, bar and even online meeting platform like Zoom. It also serve as criticism for the ever shrinking of public space in Indonesia, particularly one that's dedicated for art, culture and creativity.

In July 2026, the play was performed in Auckland, New Zealand. The original text was adapted by director Nī Dekkers-Reihana to re-imagine core themes of the play through a te ao Māori lens, and incorporated large sections of dialogue in te reo Māori (the Māori language), and a scene performed in New Zealand Sign Language. It starred Jarod Rawiri and Renaye Tamati. The staging of the production, produced by Silo Theatre and performed at Q Theatre, Auckland, co-incided with Matariki, a celebration of the Māori new year, which honours and acknowledges the core principles of remembrance of the past, celebration of the present, and hope and planning for the future.

As of 2026, it is also a favored play and main part of Professor Tracy Ross's (UBCO) Theatre/Film 103 class.

== Casts ==
Characters	2012 Original West End cast	2015 Original Broadway cast	2021 West End revival
Marianne (or *Manuel)	Sally Hawkins	Ruth Wilson	Sheila Atim
Marianne (or *Manuel)	Sally Hawkins	Ruth Wilson	Omari Douglas*
Marianne (or *Manuel)	Sally Hawkins	Ruth Wilson	Anna Maxwell Martin
Marianne (or *Manuel)	Sally Hawkins	Ruth Wilson	Zoë Wanamaker
Roland	Rafe Spall	Jake Gyllenhaal	Peter Capaldi
Roland	Rafe Spall	Jake Gyllenhaal	Ivanno Jeremiah
Roland	Rafe Spall	Jake Gyllenhaal	Chris O'Dowd
Roland	Rafe Spall	Jake Gyllenhaal	Russell Tovey

== Publication ==
Several versions of the play have been published in the United Kingdom and the United States.
