= 2003 WhatsOnStage Awards =

British theatre awards

The WhatsOnStage Awards, founded in 2001 as the Theatregoers' Choice Awards, are a fan-driven set of awards organised by the theatre website WhatsOnStage.com, based on a popular vote recognising performers and productions of English theatre, with an emphasis on London's West End theatre.

The results of the 2003 Whatsonstage.com Awards were:

Category	Winner	% of Vote
Best Actress in a Play	Gillian Anderson – What the Night Is For at the Comedy	44%
Best Actor in a Play	Samuel West – Hamlet, RSC at the Barbican	26%
Best Supporting Actress in a Play	Sian Thomas – Up for Grabs at Wyndhams & The Price at the Tricycle	24%
Best Supporting Actor in a Play	Richard Coyle – Proof at the Donmar Warehouse & The York Realist, English Touring Theatre at the Royal Court & Strand	23%
Best Actress in a Musical	Hannah Jane Fox – We Will Rock You at the Dominion	54%
Best Actor in a Musical	Tony Vincent – We Will Rock You at the Dominion	50%
Best Supporting Performance in a Musical	Sharon D Clarke – We Will Rock You at the Dominion	50%
Best Solo Performance	Pete Postlethwaite – Scaramouche Jones at Riverside Studios	25%
Best Ensemble Performance	Contact – at the Queen's	28%
Best New Play	The Breath of Life by David Hare – at the Theatre Royal Haymarket	25%
Best New Comedy	This Is Our Youth by Kenneth Lonergan – at the Garrick	23%
Best New Musical	We Will Rock You by Queen & Ben Elton – at the Dominion	49%
Best Play Revival	A Streetcar Named Desire – at the NT Lyttelton	33%
Best Musical Revival	South Pacific – at the NT Olivier	34%
Best Shakespearean Production	Macbeth – at the Albery	23%
Best Director	Christopher Renshaw – Taboo at the Venue & We Will Rock You at the Dominion	46%
Best Set Designer	Anthony Ward – Chitty Chitty Bang Bang at the London Palladium	37%
Best Choreographer	Jerry Mitchell – The Full Monty at the Prince of Wales	24%
London Newcomer of the Year	Jake Gyllenhaal – This Is Our Youth at the Garrick	27%
Planet Hollywood Theatre Event of the Year	Madonna's West End debut in Up for Grabs at the Wyndham's Theatre	35%
