= WhatsOnStage.com =

British theatre website, founded 1996

WhatsOnStage is a UK-based theatre website providing news, reviews, interviews, and a comprehensive listings database of performances across the country. The platform claims to list over 5,000 performances at any given time and also operates a ticketing service through commercial partnerships.

== History ==
WhatsOnStage was founded in 1996 by the media corporation EMAP, with Carol Dukes playing a key role in its initial development. In 1999, it was acquired by Terri Paddock and David Dobson, who managed the company for the following 13 years. The site was subsequently purchased by the Time Out Group in 2012 and then acquired by TheaterMania, which operates the similar New York theatre website TheaterMania.com, in January 2013.

In 2017, AudienceView bought TheaterMania, adding the WhatsOnStage.com and TheaterMania.com websites to its existing ticketing and marketing portfolio.

== WhatsOnStage Awards ==
In 2000, the company launched the WhatsOnStage Awards, which are entirely decided by public vote. These awards are recognized as the only major UK theatre awards determined by audiences, attracting hundreds of thousands of voters each year.

== Theatre Club ==
WhatsOnStage also operates the WhatsOnStage Theatre Club, a membership service that provides access to discounted group theatre outings and exclusive events. Benefits include post-show Q&A sessions with casts and creatives, as well as opportunities for meet-and-greets and other exclusive content.
