= Help =

Help or The Help may refer to:

- Helping behavior

== Arts, entertainment and media ==
=== Film ===
- Help! (film), 1965, starring the Beatles
- Help (2010 film), a Bollywood horror film
- Help (2021 theatrical film), a British psychological thriller
- Help (2021 TV film), about the COVID-19 pandemic
- The Help (film), 2011, based on Kathryn Stockett's novel
  - The Help (soundtrack)

=== Television ===
==== Series ====
- Help (Australian TV series), a 2006 documentary series
- Help (Dutch TV series), a 1994 drama
- Help (British TV series), a 2005 comedy
- H.E.L.P., a 1990 American TV drama series
- The Help (TV series), a 2004 American sitcom
- Dr. Henry's Emergency Lessons for People, also known as H.E.L.P.!, a 1979 American series of animated public service announcements

==== Episodes ====
- "Help" (Buffy the Vampire Slayer), 2002
- "Help", a 1980 episode of The Gentle Touch
- "Help", a 2011 episode of The Protector
- "Help", a 2001 episode of Spaced
- "The Help" (Modern Family), 2013

=== Literature ===
- Help! (magazine), an American satire magazine
- The Help, a historical fiction novel by Kathryn Stockett, 2009

=== Music ===
==== Bands ====
- Help (band), an American rock band

==== Albums ====
- Help!, the 1965 Beatles album which includes songs from the film Help!
- Help (Blackbear album), 2015
- Help! (Brandon Lake album), 2022
- Help! (George Martin album), 1965
- Help! (Sylar album), 2016
- Help (Thee Oh Sees album), 2009
- The Help Album, a 1995 charity album
  - Help(2), 2026

==== Songs ====
- "Help!" (song), by the Beatles, 1965
- "Help" (Papa Roach song), 2017
- "Help!", a song by Beatallica from the 2013 album Abbey Load
- "Help!", a song by Brandon Lake from the 2022 album Help!
- "Help", a song by Hurts from the 2013 album Exile
- "Help", a song by Lil Wayne from the 2020 album Funeral deluxe edition
- "Help", a song by Lloyd Banks from the 2006 album Rotten Apple
- "Help", a song by London Grammar from the 2013 album If You Wait
- "Help", a song by Pink Guy from the 2017 album Pink Season

== Businesses and organizations ==
- HELP University, in Kuala Lumpur, Malaysia
- Help Remedies, an American pharmaceutical company
- United States Senate Committee on Health, Education, Labor and Pensions (HELP)

== Other uses ==
- help (command), in computing
- Help (dog) (1878–1891), Scotch collie dog used to collect charitable donations
- The help, a pejorative term for domestic workers
- Heat escape lessening position (HELP), a human position to reduce heat loss while immersed in cold water
- Higher Education Loan Programme (HELP), for tertiary education fees in Australia
- Hydrologic Evaluation of Landfill Performance (HELP), a numerical model

== See also ==
- Assistance (disambiguation)
- Distress signal
  - Mayday
  - SOS
  - Signal for Help
- Emergency
  - Emergency telephone number
  - Hue and cry, a shouted command to arrest a felon
- Help! Help!, a 1912 silent film
- Help desk
- Help me (disambiguation)
- HELLP syndrome, a complication of pregnancy
- Online help
  - Context-sensitive help
