= Future Past (Duncan James album) =

Studio album by Duncan James
- Released: 12 June 2006
- Length: 54:03
- Label: Innocent
- Producers: Andreas Carlsson; Stephen Lipson; Matt Prime; Peter Vettese; Andrew Lloyd Webber; Eg White

Singles from Future Past
- 1. "Sooner or Later" Released: 5 June 2006; 2. "Can't Stop a River" Released: 21 August 2006; 3. "Amazed" Released: 12 March 2007

Future Past is the debut studio album by English singer Duncan James. Produced after the disbandment of his group Blue, it was released on 12 June 2006 through Innocent Records.

== Background ==
James' solo career began in October 2004, when he collaborated with singer-songwriter Keedie on the single "I Believe My Heart", which was a number-two hit on the UK Singles Chart. Shortly after, James began recording a solo album, with the help of producer Stephen Lipson, who had collaborated with the likes of Boyzone, Ronan Keating, Daniel Bedingfield and Will Young. The album was released on 12 June 2006, a week after the release of the lead single, "Sooner or Later", which only peaked at #35 on the UK Singles Chart. Upon the week of release, the album only peaked at #55 on the UK Albums Chart. In an attempt to boost sales, "Can't Stop a River" was released as the album's second single on 21 August 2006 but this charted even lower than "Sooner or Later", only peaking at #59 on the UK Singles Chart. "Amazed" was released as third and final single only in Italy and Germany on September 29, 2006. It was planned for a UK release on March 12, 2007, but was canceled when James was fired from the label in January 2007.

== Critical reception ==
Professional ratings
Review scores
Source	Rating
AllMusic	2/5 stars
The Guardian	2/5 stars

Sharon Mawer of Allmusic gave the album two out of five stars, stating: "Despite having high hopes after the success of Simon Webbe and Lee Ryan's solo careers, and having a hit single already behind him, Duncan James' "Future Past" was doomed from the outset after the poor performances of the lead singles "Sooner or Later" and "Can't Stop a River", despite the latter being backed by the writing talents of Seal. Every one of the twelve songs fails to break the mid-tempo ballad barrier, with only "Letter to God" being an out-and-out slow ballad. There is definitely a need for greater contrast and stronger imagination, something which this album clearly lacks." Talia Kraines from BBC Music found that Future Past "isn't an album full of exciting pop songs to get your blood rushing, but if you're missing Darius and after a bunch of mid-tempo pop songs to ease you through the day then this might just be it [...] Claiming serious pop writers such as Stephen Lipson and Peter Vetesse on his album notes, Duncan's younger fans should stay well away. He's no longer your pin up – but your mum's."

== Commercial performance ==
Future Past debuted and peaked at number 55 on the UK Albums Chart. The album founder greater commercial success in Italy, where it peaked at number two on the Italian Albums Chart. It was eventually certified gold by the Federazione Industria Musicale Italiana (FIMI).

== Track listing ==
Future Past track listing
No.	Title	Writer(s)	Producer(s)	Length
1.	"Sooner or Later"	Duncan James; Chris Braide; Jez Ashurst	Stephen Lipson	3:43
2.	"Suffer"	James; Matt Prime; Tim Woodcock	Prime	3:45
3.	"I Come Alive"	James; Braide; Andreas Carlsson	Carlsson	4:03
4.	"Can't Stop a River"	Seal; Peter Gordeno	Lipson	3:53
5.	"I Don't Wanna Stop"	James; Peter Vettese	Vetesse	4:02
6.	"What Are We Waiting For"	James; Eg White	White	3:52
7.	"Amazed"	Marv Green; Chris Lindsey; Aimee Mayo	Prime	3:59
8.	"Turn My Head"	Jamie Arlon; Timothy Arlon; Philip Pickett	Lipson	3:57
9.	"Letter to God"	Braide; Carlsson	Lipson	3:33
10.	"Breathing"	James; Vettese; Pete Francis	Vetesse	3:34
11.	"Frequency"	James; Braide; Carlsson	Carlsson	3:48
12.	"Somebody Still Loves You"	James; Braide	Lipson	3:27
13.	"Save This Moment for Me"	James; Vettese	Vettese	4:42
Total length:				54:03

Japanese bonus tracks
No.	Title	Writer(s)	Producer(s)	Length
14.	"You Can"	James; White	White	3:34
15.	"Part Time Love"	James; Prime; Karen Poole	Prime	3:58

Italian bonus tracks
No.	Title	Writer(s)	Producer(s)	Length
14.	"Senza Lei"	Martin Sutton; Sean Sutton; Christopher Neil; Annalisa Tripani	Lipson	3:50
15.	"Senza Lei" (featuring Mafy)	M. Sutton; S. Sutton; Neil; Tripani	Lipson	4:03
16.	"Can't Stop a River" (Acoustic)	Seal; Gordeno	Lipson	3:37
17.	"Simple Love Song"	Richard Starkey; Vini Poncia	Lipson	2:58

German bonus tracks
No.	Title	Writer(s)	Producer(s)	Length
14.	"This Day"	James; Vettese; Poole	Vettese	3:42
15.	"I Believe My Heart" (featuring Keedie)	David Zippel; Andrew Lloyd Webber	Webber	3:56

== Charts ==
Weekly chart performance for Future Past
Chart (2006)	Peak position
German Albums (Offizielle Top 100)	68
Greek Albums (IFPI)	39
Irish Albums (IRMA)	55
Italian Albums (FIMI)	2
Italian Albums (Musica e dischi)	9
Japanese Albums (Oricon)	29
Scottish Albums (Official Charts)	72
Swiss Albums (Schweizer Hitparade)	59
UK Albums (Official Charts)	55

== Certifications ==
Certifications of Future Past
Region	Certification	Certified units/sales
Italy (FIMI)	Gold	40,000^{*}
^{*} Sales figures based on certification alone.
