= Taberer =

Taberer' is a surname. Notable people with the name include:

- Bill Taberer (1872–1938), South African rugby union player
- Donna Taberer, British television producer
- Henry Taberer (1870–1932), South African cricketer

== See also ==
- Tabberer, surname
