= Louise Setara =

- Born: Louise Smith; 21 August 1988 (age 38)
- Origin: Reading, Berkshire, England
- Genres: Pop, soul
- Years active: 2004–present
- Label: Manhattan Records / EMI

Louise Setara (born Louise Smith, 21 August 1988 in Reading, Berkshire, England) is an English singer and songwriter. Her first album, Still Waters, was released by Manhattan Records/EMI in February 2007.

Setara decided to become a singer at the age of seven, after performing at a wedding party with a member of The Drifters. When she was fifteen years old, she signed a management contract with Kwame Kwaten, who had worked with Mick Jagger and Seal. She chose the name "Setara", from sithara, meaning "little star" in Punjabi.

== Early life ==
Setara was born in Reading, England, where she was homeschooled by her mother, Lorraine. She decided at the age of seven that she wanted to become a professional singer, when a member of The Drifters performed at a wedding she was attending and invited her on stage to sing "My Girl" with him.

== Career ==
Setara was signed up at the age of 15 by producer Kwame Kwaten, who spotted her at a talent contest. Her singing style is described as a mixture of soul and gospel. She wrote her first song, "Wrong Again", with composers Peter Gordeno and Chris Porter. Another of the tracks on Still Waters is performed with the South African group, Ladysmith Black Mambazo, and "Can't Stop the River" was written by Seal. The album was chosen as 'Album of the Week' by BBC Radio 2 in January 2007.

Her debut single, "Can't Stop the River" was released in the UK on 27 November 2006 without a music video. Unknown to her, it was also given to Duncan James and Guy Sebastian to record. She eventually released her original recording of the song after both artists had released their versions of "Can't Stop the River", re-titled "Can't Stop a River".

She supported Lionel Richie on his UK tour in 2007.

A download-only single, "Wrong Again", was released on 29 January 2007, and as a full single later in 2007.

In 2018, she auditioned for The X Factor and made it to the Judges' Houses.

== Discography ==
=== Albums ===
- Still Waters (2006 US / 2007 UK)
- Gypsy Flame (2009 UK)

=== EPs ===
- Walk with Me EP (2005)

=== Singles ===
- "Can't Stop the River" (2006)
- "Love Me Still" (April 2007)
- "Wrong Again" (June 2007)
