= Duncan James =

English singer and actor (born 1978)

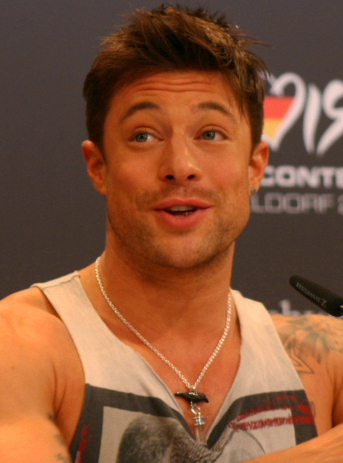
- James in 2011

Background information
- Born: Duncan Matthew James Inglis; 7 April 1978 (age 48)
- Genres: Pop; R&B
- Occupations: Singer; actor; television presenter
- Instrument: Vocals
- Years active: 2000–present
- Label: Innocent
- Partner: Alexander Roque

Duncan Matthew James Inglis (born 7 April 1978) is an English singer, actor and television presenter. He is a member of the boy band Blue and later played the role of Ryan Knight in the British soap opera Hollyoaks.

== Early life ==
James grew up in Dorset as an only child, and was raised primarily by his mother Fiona Inglis and his grandparents, after his father abandoned his mother before he was born. He was raised a "strict Catholic" and educated at Dumpton School in Wimborne (where his grandfather worked as a music teacher), Milldown School (Blandford Forum), Corfe Hills School (Broadstone), and Sidmouth College (East Devon).

At the age of 15 he played Puck in A Midsummer Night's Dream and Dr Watson in Sherlock Holmes for Sidmouth Youth Theatre.

== Career ==
=== 2000–2005: Career with Blue ===
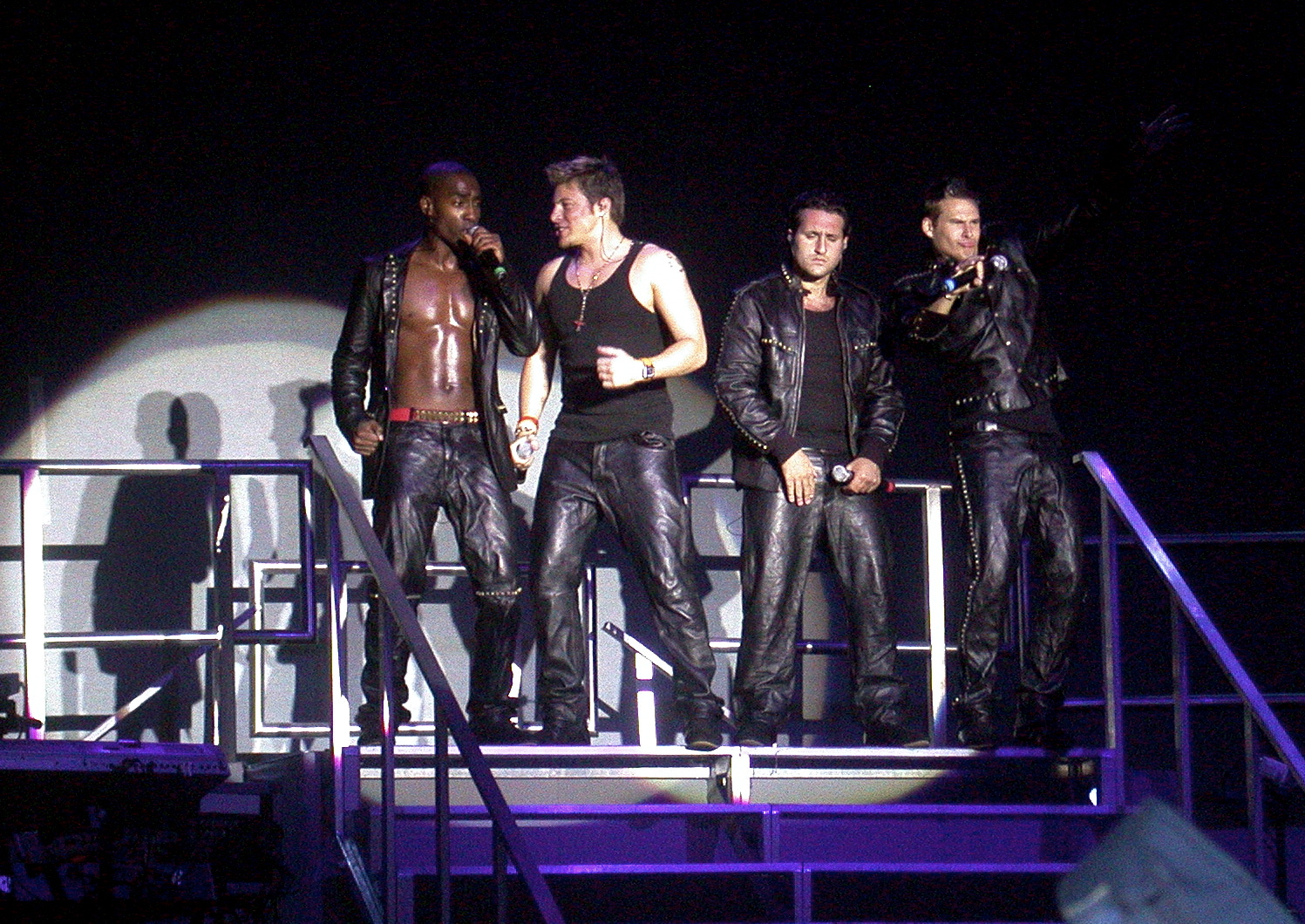
Blue performing Greatest Hits Tour, in 2005

James, along with Antony Costa, convinced Lee Ryan and Simon Webbe in early 2000 to form the group Blue. Blue's R&B-influenced pop allowed the group to achieve commercial success in the United Kingdom and many other countries, including Ireland, Portugal, Belgium, Italy, France, Australia and New Zealand. The band released their debut single "All Rise" in May 2001 and it reached No. 4 on the UK Singles Chart. Their follow up single, "Too Close", was released in August 2001 peaking at No. 1 on the UK Singles Chart. They went on to achieve a second number one in November with the ballad "If You Come Back". The album All Rise was released in time for Christmas and reached number one on the UK Albums Chart, eventually selling in excess of 1.8 million albums in the UK. The final single from the album, "Fly By II", reached No. 6 in March 2002.

Their second studio album, One Love, was released in October 2002; it entered the UK Albums Chart at No. 1 and sold more than 150,000 copies. Three singles were released from the album: "One Love", which peaked at No. 3, "Sorry Seems to Be the Hardest Word", featuring vocals from Elton John, which peaked at No. 1, and "U Make Me Wanna", which peaked at No. 4. Their third studio album, Guilty, was released in autumn 2003; it too entered the UK Albums Chart at No. 1, and sold 100,000 copies in the week of release. The album spawned four singles, including "Guilty", which peaked at No. 2, "Signed, Sealed, Delivered I'm Yours", featuring vocals from Stevie Wonder and Angie Stone, which peaked at No. 11, "Breathe Easy", which peaked at No. 4, and "Bubblin'", which peaked at No. 9.

Two compilation albums Best of Blue and 4ever Blue were released in 2004 and 2005 respectively. 4ever Blue included three tracks only previously performed in Japan: "The Gift", "It's Alright" and "Elements". It is indicated in the album booklet that a live version of "Lonely This Christmas" from the TV show CD:UK was intended to be track seven on the album; however, this was removed from the track listing for unknown reasons. The album was available in several European countries, as well as Japan, Thailand and China; however, it was a commercial failure, and failed to chart anywhere. The album was not released in the UK, despite copies being widely available.

=== 2006–2010: Future Past, stage and television ===
James returned to the music scene in May 2006 with his solo single "Sooner or Later", releasing the video in early May and planning to release the single commercially on 5 June 2006. The video reached No. 2 on The Box and No. 5 on The Hits. However, the single was no commercial success and entered the British charts at No. 35, before slipping down to No. 72 in its second week. "Can't Stop a River" was James's next single. Released on 21 August 2006, the track only reached No. 59 in the UK and No. 97 in Ireland. In continental Europe, where "Can't Stop a River" was released a day earlier than in the UK, it similarly proved unpopular, dropping out of the singles charts in many countries such as France, Turkey, Germany, and Belgium. James' album also fell short, selling less than 1,000 copies in the UK in its first week (and failing to reach the Top 50). The album sold a total of 412,350 copies around the world.

Although his debut album Future Past did not do as well as hoped (except in Italy, where it reached No. 2 on the chart and was certified platinum for shipments of 80,000 copies), on 2 February 2007, music channel B4 premièred the video for "Amazed", his new single which was scheduled to be released on 12 March 2007. However, there was once again a lack of interest. The release was cancelled and James was dropped from his recording contract. He has since announced he has quit his solo career. In 2007 he appeared in the West End production of Chicago. He completed ten more weeks in Chicago from 10 December 2007 until 9 February 2008. He appeared in an episode of The Bill entitled "The Morning After", which aired on 1 January 2009. It was confirmed in February 2009 that James had been selected to replace Denise Van Outen as presenter of Grease: The School Musical, the sequel to Hairspray: The School Musical. Filming commenced in early 2009.

In May 2009, James announced the UK's voting in the Eurovision Song Contest. He presented Hannah-Oke on Disney Channel UK, a singing and dancing contest based on the popular Disney TV series Hannah Montana. He also appeared on Celebrity Are You Smarter Than A 10 Year Old? and raised £10,000 for his charities. In 2006, James appeared with the other members of the boyband Blue on 26 June episode of Ministry of Mayhem, where James and the other band members were all hypnotised by UK stage hypnotist David Days.

James has worked occasionally as a television presenter, having presented the 95.8 Capital FM's Party in the Park for the Prince's Trust (2003 and 2004), and ITV2's coverage of the TV series Soapstar Superstar, along with Jayne Middlemiss. His other presenting work includes Pop City Live, Variety Club Showbusiness Awards 2004, T4 Movie Special: Spider-Man 2, Record of the Year: Downloaded and GMTV's Entertainment Today.

He took part on ITV1's Dancing on Ice in 2007, when he made it to the grand final alongside rugby player Kyran Bracken and actress Clare Buckfield. He came third in the contest, although was unable to perform his Bolero performance. In 2007, James played himself in the pilot episode of Plus One, which was part of Channel 4's Comedy Showcase. A full series was broadcast in 2009, in which he played a broad caricature of himself called "Duncan From Blue". He made an appearance on a new show for Sky One, Guinness World Records Smashed, performing with Festival4Stars contestants. It aired in November 2008. In 2008 he became an Ambassador of Festival4Stars talent competition after he judged a national final. James was cast as one of the leads in the musical Legally Blonde (adapted from the film Legally Blonde) as it transferred from Broadway to London's West End in December 2009. He played opposite Sheridan Smith as Elle, and Aoife Mulholland as Brooke. In December 2009, James appeared as Warner Huntington III in the West End production of Legally Blonde. He appeared as a celebrity guest on 14 August 2009 on Daily Cooks Challenge.

In 2010, James presented the quiz show Scream if You Know the Answer! where the contestants have to answer questions whilst on rollercoasters. In July 2010 he was a judge on Don't Stop Believing, a talent show for choirs. He has his own radio show on 95.8 Capital FM, every Sunday from 7–10 pm.

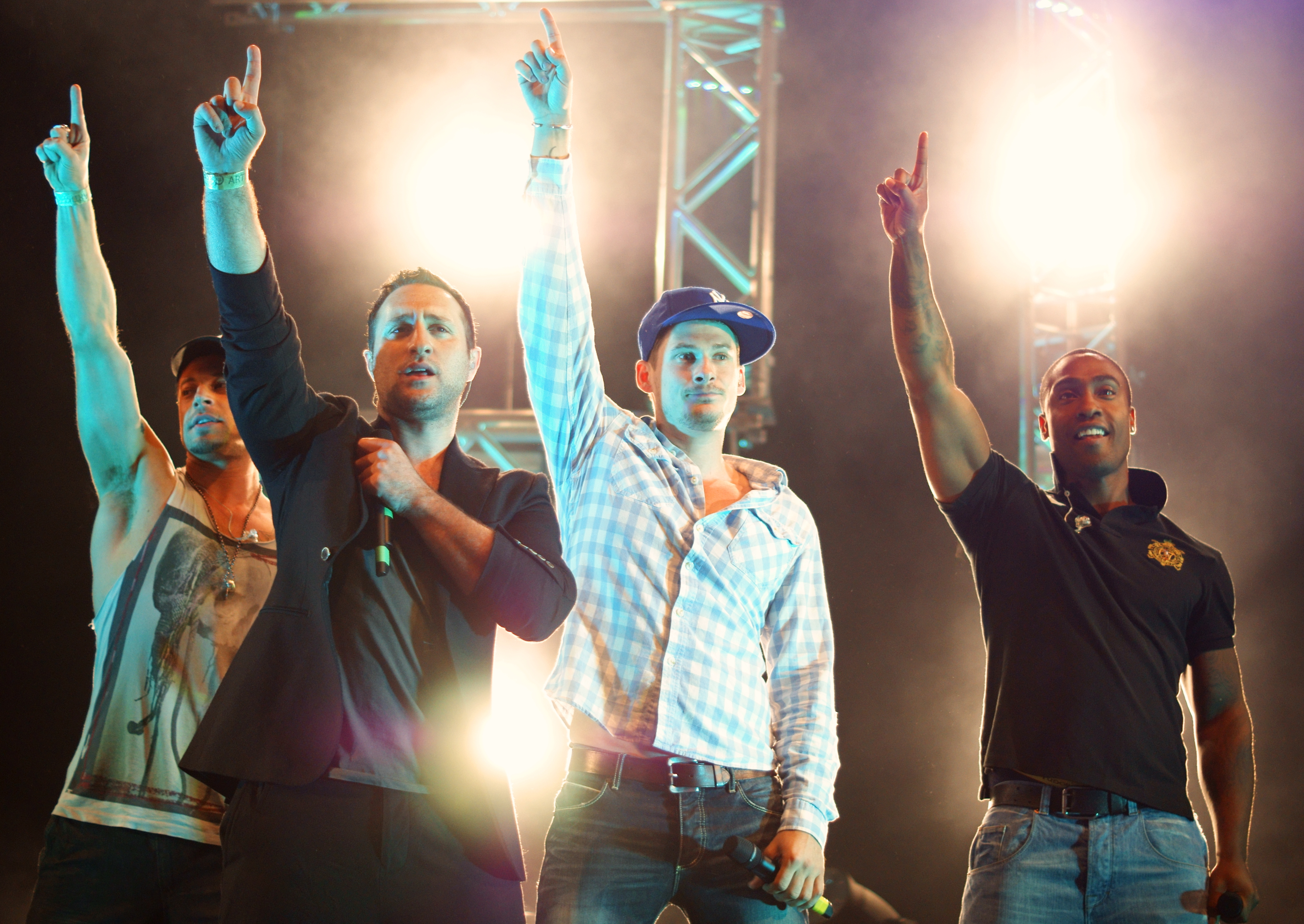
Blue performing in Manchester in 2011

=== 2011–present: Return with Blue ===
The band represented the UK at the 2011 Eurovision Song Contest in Düsseldorf with the song "I Can" coming in 11th place with 100 points. Blue released their fourth studio album, Roulette on 25 January 2013 with "Hurt Lovers" as the lead single. On 21 February 2013, it was confirmed that the group would be joining The Big Reunion, a TV series in which six groups from the past, including Liberty X, Atomic Kitten and Five, reform for a one-off gig. Beginning in May 2013, the group were to tour Great Britain and Ireland with the other groups in The Big Reunion concert series. On 27 March 2013 the group announced they would embark on their first headlining tour later on in the year, their first tour in nearly ten years. On Sunday 29 May 2022 James performed at Durham Pride 2022 as the headline act. In September 2023, James released the duet "That's What Friends Are For" with Denise van Outen. The single, in aid of Macmillan Cancer Support, was recorded in tribute to their friend, singer Sarah Harding, who died from breast cancer in 2021.

== Personal life ==
From 2002 to 2005, James dated the former professional dancer Claire Grainger, with whom he has a daughter born in February 2005. On 12 July 2009, James came out as bisexual in an interview from News of the World. In 2014, however, he declared that he is a gay man. In 2014, Lee Ryan claimed that he had a regular sexual relationship with James during the band's early years.

Since 2019, he was dating Brazilian photographer Rodrigo Reis, but is now in a relationship with Alexander Roque.

== Filmography ==
=== Television ===
| Year | Title | Role | Notes |
|---|---|---|---|
| 2003 | Bo' Selecta! | Himself | Episode: "Blue" |
| 2006–2007 | Soapstar Superstar: Extra Tracks | Presenter | |
| 2007 | Dancing on Ice | Contestant | Series 2 |
| 2007 | DanceX | Billy Flynn | Episode: "4 August 2007" |
| 2007 | Comedy Showcase | Himself | Episode: "Plus One" |
| 2009 | The Bill | Dan Coleman | Episode: "The Morning After" |
| 2009 | Plus One | Duncan | Main role |
| 2009 | Grease: The School Musical | Judge | |
| 2009 | Hannah-Oke | Presenter | |
| 2010 | Don't Stop Believing | Judge | |
| 2010–2011 | Scream! If You Know the Answer | Presenter | |
| 2012 | Spy | Presenter | |
| 2016 | Pointless Celebrities | Contestant | Christmas special |
| 2016–2018 | Hollyoaks | Ryan Knight | Main role |
| 2021 | Celebs on the Farm | Contestant | Series 3 |
| 2021 | The Celebrity Circle | Contestant | |
| 2021 | Celebrity Masterchef | Contestant | Series 16 |
| 2025 | Celebrity Hunted | Contestant | |

=== Films ===
| Year | Title | Role |
|---|---|---|
| 2021 | Help | Jogger |
| 2024 | A European Christmas | Freddie Buttons |

== Discography ==
=== Studio albums ===
List of albums, with selected chart positions and certifications
| Title | Details | Peak chart positions | | | | | | |
| Title | Details | UK | GER | IRE | ITA | JPN | SCO | SWI |
|---|---|---|---|---|---|---|---|---|
| Future Past | Released: 12 June 2006; Label: Innocent; Format: CD, digital download | 55 | 68 | 55 | 2 | 29 | 72 | 59 |

=== Singles ===
List of singles, with selected chart positions and certifications
| Title | Year | Peak chart positions | | | | | | | | Album |
| Title | Year | UK | BEL | EUR | GER | IRE | ITA | SCO | SWI | Album |
|---|---|---|---|---|---|---|---|---|---|---|
| "I Believe My Heart" (with Keedie) | 2004 | 2 | 66 | 8 | 67 | 29 | 13 | 3 | 49 | I Believe My Heart |
| "Sooner or Later" | 2006 | 35 | 52 | — | — | — | 3 | 19 | — | Future Past |
| "Can't Stop a River" | 2006 | 59 | — | — | — | — | 23 | 32 | — | Future Past |
| "Amazed" | 2006 | — | — | — | — | — | 41 | — | — | Future Past |
| "That's What Friends Are For" (with Denise van Outen) | 2023 | — (Note: "That's What Friends Are For" did not enter the UK Singles Top 100 but debuted and peaked at number 53 on the UK Singles Downloads Chart Top 100 on 8 September 2023.) | — | — | — | — | — | — | — | Non-album single |
"—" denotes releases that did not chart or were not released in that territory.

=== Promotional singles ===
List of promotional singles
| Title | Year | Album |
|---|---|---|
| "Greatest Love of All" (featuring Rachel Stevens) | 2009 | Charity single |

== Bibliography ==
- AllMusic's description of Blue
- "Life of Ryan", "The Guardian", 3 July 2005, retrieved 17 May 2006
- "Duncan James slams ex-bandmates, "ContactMusic", 1 May 2006, retrieved 17 May 2006
- Everyhit.com Lists chart ranks for UK singles
- "James vows to be a good dad", "ContactMusic", 1 December 2004, retrieved 17 May 2006
- "When does the fun start?" by Zoe Williams, The Guardian, 4 October 2003, retrieved 17 May 2006
