= Don't Stop Believing (TV series) =

2010 British TV series

- Genre: Talent show Reality television
- Directed by: Stuart McDonald
- Presented by: Emma Bunton; Phil Clifton (backstage)
- Judges: Duncan James; Anastacia; Tamzin Outhwaite; Charles Klapow
- Country of origin: United Kingdom
- No. of series: 1
- No. of episodes: 6

Production
- Production location: The Maidstone Studios
- Production companies: Shine TV; Group M Entertainment

Original release
- Network: Channel 5
- Release: 18 July – 22 August 2010

Related
- Glee

Don't Stop Believing is a British television talent show that aired on Channel 5 in summer 2010. It was inspired by the musical comedy-drama Glee, which airs in the United States on the Fox network. The series featured live shows in which musical performance groups competed against each other, with viewers voting on the winner. Solo singers were also sought to join a group to represent the United Kingdom on the American glee club circuit. The show was hosted by Emma Bunton, and judged by Anastacia, Duncan James, Tamzin Outhwaite and Charles "Chucky" Klapow. The programme was shown in simulcast on Irish TV channel 3e and repeated a week later on parent channel TV3 Ireland. The show was not renewed for a second series due to low ratings.

== Development ==
Don't Stop Believing was produced by Shine TV and GroupM Entertainment. Based on the popularity of Glee and High School Musical and billed as Glee meets The X Factor, the show intended to combine elements of both singing and dancing competitions. Five's controller, Richard Woolfe, stated: "There's an explosion in musical performance groups and Don't Stop Believing will tap into that exciting groundswell. This will be the first series to combine both singing and dancing to create an amazing entertainment spectacle which will completely capture the viewers' imagination.". By May 2010, over 3,000 groups had applied to take part in the show via the Five website.

Social networking website MySpace is the show's online hub, featuring exclusive content including video webchats with the judges, highlights of the show and choreography tutorials. Users are able to purchase tracks from the programme directly through MySpace. Sophie Rouse, director of marketing at MySpace UK, stated: "As a platform dedicated to the discovery of new content, MySpace can add an extra dimension to big events like these, giving fans the opportunity to interact directly with the talent and exclusive content from the show."

== Format ==
Established and new musical performance groups compete in a series of live shows, performing well-known songs in new arrangements. Contestants perform in front of celebrity judges, with viewers voting for the winner. Alongside the main competition, solo singers are invited to join a group to represent the United Kingdom on the American glee club circuit. Auditions are held while the series airs, with new members joining each week.

== Judges and host ==
The show is hosted by Emma Bunton. Five's head of entertainment, Donna Taberer, stated that she was "utterly thrilled" to have Emma as part of the project, deeming her the "perfect host" due to her singing, dancing and presenting experience. Bunton commented: "Like millions of others I'm currently obsessed with musical performance groups so I am beyond excited", telling The Belfast Telegraph that she is a "huge fan" of Glee. The show's judges are former EastEnders actress Tamzin Outhwaite, Blue member Duncan James, singer Anastacia and High School Musical choreographer Charles "Chucky" Klapow.

== Heats ==
=== Heat 1 (18 July 2010) ===
Order	Act	Song	Original artist(s)/show	Result
1	Dice	"Do Your Thing!" / "Voulez-Vous"	Basement Jaxx / ABBA	Top three, wild card
2	The ClasSix	"Video Killed the Radio Star"	The Buggles	Eliminated
3	Step Up	"Signed, Sealed, Delivered I'm Yours" / "Think"	Stevie Wonder / Aretha Franklin	Eliminated
4	Manchester Show Choir	"Bad Romance" / "Poker Face"	Lady Gaga	Top three, eliminated
5	Singer Station	"True Colors"	Cyndi Lauper	Through to final
6	Eschoir	"Sex on Fire"	Kings of Leon	Eliminated

=== Heat 2 (25 July 2010) ===
Order	Act	Song	Original artist(s)/show	Result
1	Dawson's Academy	"I Want You Back" / "Back for Good"	The Jackson 5 / Take That	Eliminated
2	Roulette	"Take On Me" / "Starry Eyed"	a-ha / Ellie Goulding	Eliminated
3	SingLive	"Radio Ga Ga" / "One Vision"	Queen	Top three, wild card
4	Redroofians	"We Are Golden"	Mika	Eliminated
5	BLOK	"Something Kinda Ooooh"	Girls Aloud	Top three, eliminated
6	Three Spires	"Total Eclipse of the Heart"	Bonnie Tyler	Through to final

=== Heat 3 (1 August 2010) ===
Order	Act	Song	Original artist(s)/show	Result
1	Swish	"Angels" / "Let Me Entertain You"	Robbie Williams	Top three, wildcard
2	Jacobs Street	"We're all in this Together"	High School Musical	Eliminated
3	Bridgwater Show Choir	"Fascination"	Alphabeat	Eliminated
4	Love Soul Choir	"Shackles"	Mary Mary	Eliminated
5	Original Talent	"Crazy" / "Billie Jean"	Gnarls Barkley / Michael Jackson	Top three, eliminated
6	DaleDiva	"The Power of Love" / "Single Ladies (Put a Ring on It)"	Jennifer Rush / Beyoncé Knowles	Through to final

=== Heat 4 (8 August 2010) ===
Order	Act	Song	Original artist(s)/show	Result
1	The Songtimers	"Keep Holding On" / "Man in the Mirror"	Avril Lavigne / Michael Jackson	Through to final
2	Fusion Theatre	"Walking on Sunshine "	Katrina and the Waves	Top three, eliminated
3	Powerplay	"Bat out of Hell"	Meat Loaf	Eliminated
4	Sorority	"Wow" / "Spinning Around" / "Can't Get You Out of My Head"	Kylie Minogue	Eliminated
5	Musicality	"Beggin'"	Madcon	Eliminated
6	MT4UTH	"Feeling Good"	Nina Simone	Top three, wildcard

=== Heat 5 (15 August 2010) ===
Order	Act	Song	Original artist(s)/show	Result
1	Elements	"9 to 5" / "Walk This Way"	Dolly Parton / Aerosmith	Eliminated
2	Cherish	"Teenage Dirtbag "	Wheatus	Top three, wildcard
3	ToneAcity	"Waiting For a Star to Fall"	Boy Meets Girl	Eliminated
4	TCC	"Every Breath You Take"	The Police	Eliminated
5	Funky Little Choir	"Wake Me up Before You Go-Go!"	Wham!	Top three, eliminated
6	True DynaMIX	"Free Your Mind" / "Vogue"	En Vogue / Madonna	Through to final

Heat five also featured repeat performances from the series' five wildcards, hoping to secure a place in the final. This place was won by Swish.

=== Final (22 August 2010) ===
Order	Act	Song	Original artist(s)/show	Result
1	Swish	"The Loco-Motion" / "Shout"	Little Eva / The Isley Brothers	Runners-up
2	The Songtimers	"Empire State of Mind (Part II) Broken Down "	Alicia Keys	Out of the running
3	Singer Station	"Starmaker"	Fame	Out of the running
4	True DynaMIX	"Don't Stop the Music!" / "Gonna Make You Sweat (Everybody Dance Now)"	Rihanna / C+C Music Factory	Out of the running
5	Three Spires Musical Society	"One Night Only"	Dreamgirls	Out of the running
6	DaleDiva	"No More Tears (Enough Is Enough)" / "Hot Stuff"	Donna Summer / Barbra Streisand	Winners

== Reception ==
=== Ratings ===
The debut episode was watched by 1.46 million viewers; 6.8% of the viewing audience. The second episode was watched by 1.09 million viewers; 4.8% of the viewing audience. It was watched by 587,000 viewers; a 2.4% audience share. The episode was moved from the 7 pm–8.30 pm timeslot to the 8 pm-9.30 pm slot to avoid a scheduling conflict with Cricket on Five and was down 51.5% on the channel's average audience share in the slot. Episode three was down 433,000 viewers.

=== Critical response ===
Carrie Dunn of The Guardian described Don't Stop Believing as "like Glee without the budget". Dunn felt that Five's "novice status" at producing live shows was evident, "with sound cutting in and out and jagged camera work." She noted, however: "the lack of production polish seemed quite fitting as the contestants were also endearingly amateur.". The Herald's Graeme Virtue commented: "If, like me, you fell for Glee despite having a desiccated black fossil where your heart should be, it was most likely because the dementedly life-affirming musical numbers were punctuated by some smart, often prickly drama. However calculated Don't Stop Believing might be, by focusing wholly on the singin'-and-hoofin' dimension, it still risks reaching dangerous levels of non-cynicism that could irreversibly damage our national psyche in the long-term.". Emma Love of The Independent called the show "bang on the money", praising it for "tapp[ing] into Glee fever" and "pick[ing] up on a particular moment in culture with its all-singing, all-dancing groups.". Andrea Mullaney of The Scotsman deemed the series: "a predictable mash-up of the talented and deluded on their own 'journeys' being patronised and sniggered at by a judges who seem like they've just been introduced to each other 30 seconds before filming began.".

== Australian adaptation ==
The Ten Network in Australia had announced that it would produce its own adaptation of the Don't Stop Believing as part of its line-up for 2011. However, the network disclosed in November 2010 that it had halted all production on the series indefinitely, saying only that it "may return at a later date." As it turned out, the show was cancelled without an episode even being made.
