= Hairspray: The School Musical =

- Presented by: Denise van Outen
- Judges: Zoë Tyler; Stacey Haynes; Benjamin Endsley Klein; Danny Austin
- Country of origin: United Kingdom
- No. of series: 1
- No. of episodes: 8

Production
- Running time: 45 minutes
- Production companies: Mentorn Media for Sky Television

Original release
- Network: Sky1
- Release: 31 August – 5 October 2008

Hairspray: The School Musical is a 2008 reality TV series, broadcast on Sky1 in the UK, charting the development of a comprehensive school's production of the 2002 Broadway and West End musical Hairspray.

== Format ==
The series is presented by musical theatre actor Denise van Outen, narrated by Rich Rust and features vocal coach Zoë Tyler and choreographer Stacey Haynes as mentors to the students of Kingsmead School, a comprehensive secondary school with specialist performing and visual arts status in Enfield, North London. It follows the production from auditions to its first performance, held at London's Lyric Theatre on 31 August 2008. There was also a behind-the-scenes section of the programme, posted online, hosted by Ben James-Ellis, the West End's Link Larkin. Two members of the Broadway production team – Benjamin Endsley Klein (directing) and Danny Austin (choreography) – serve as consultants to the school production.

== Reception ==
In The Guardian, Lucy Mangan said that although she was not expecting the programme to provide "an enjoyable hour's entertainment", "the unforced charm and ebullience of [...] London's juvenile population quickly swept the viewer up" and that she would be watching "another gloriously uplifting hour next week". Theatre columnist Mark Shenton, having seen the finished production, suggested that although the series shows "inevitably a heightened version of the experience of putting on a show [...] it will surely encourage [the young actors] to do so again". He also noted that the West End production of Hairspray "is sure to be the first winner, as audiences follow the TV experience by seeing it live for themselves".

The first episode attracted almost 500,000 viewers, leading Richard Woolfe, the controller of Sky1, to suggest that the series could continue with other productions: "I have a sneaking suspicion we will be coming back for a bit more. Whatever the viewing figures ... we have changed lives."

The next Series appeared one year later called Grease: The School Musical and was broadcast between 31 August and October on Sky 1.
