= Babbacombe Theatre =

Theatre in Devon, England

- The Babbacombe Downs Concert Hall
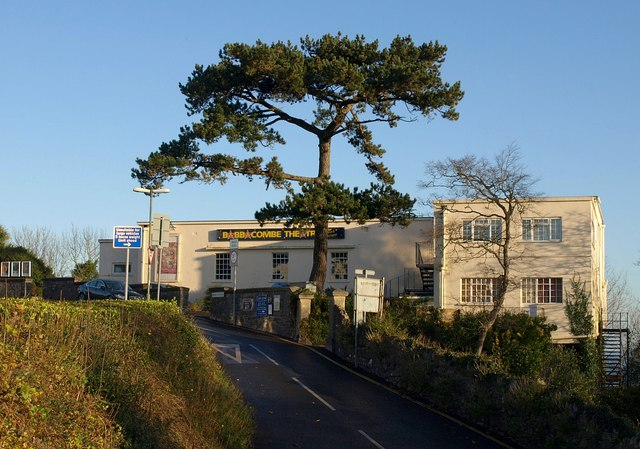
- Interactive map of Babbacombe Theatre
- Address: Babbacombe Downs Road; Torquay, South Devon; United Kingdom
- Coordinates: 50.479597°N 3.514123°W
- Owner: Matthews Productions Limited
- Capacity: 600
- Type: Variety theatre

Construction
- Opened: 27 May 1939
- Architect: P.W. Ladmore

Website
- www.babbacombe-theatre.com

The Babbacombe Theatre is a theatre in Babbacombe in Torquay, South Devon, England. Refurbished in 2009, the venue has been part of the Bay's tourism industry since the 1930s, and is known for staging variety shows, particularly since 1986 when Colin Matthews took over the venue.

The theatre boasts the longest running summer season in the country, lasting nine months. With a regular Christmas show as well as touring productions, the venue is open throughout the year.

== History ==
The Babbacombe Theatre was built gradually on the grounds of a site where bands played in the summer. The Babbacombe Downs Concert Hall was built in 1938 to replace the weather-damage bandstand and awning, which had been constructed in 1920 and 1935. The hall could be built no higher than the old awning, so all the seats in the auditorium are on one level. Ernest Goss' Municipal Orchestra with the BBC's baritone John Steabben were the inaugural performers at the 27 May 1939, debut. The first Sunday concert was a live radio broadcast with Redvers Llewellyn, on Sunday 4 June. That same evening patrons could hear and see the famous Richard Tauber under the baton of Mr Goss and the Municipal Orchestra, tickets were on sale at 10/6d, 7/6d, 3/6d & 2/6d.

The military commandeered the Hall during World War II to give lectures for the aircrew trainees of the RAF. It is documented that 27,000 aircrew were trained at the theatre. In June 1940, the venue became the No. 1 Air Crew Receiving Centre, with new airmen being kitted out at the nearby Babbacombe Garage. ENSA shows took the place of summer entertainment, during the war years. Little else is known of the venue's wartime history, except for an anniversary concert on 17 November 1942 with Music of the Allied Nations, presented by the Royal Air Force 'Flying Training Command Band'. On the tail end of the victory celebrations in 1946 Leslie Vernon starred in Tissington and Craig's new production Moonshine. This production was to last for seven years.

Many years of summer shows subsequently followed, and the venue, now renamed The Babbacombe Theatre developed a reputation for hosting rising stars on the threshold of their careers. Many of them appeared as part of Hedley Claxton's Gaytime productions, including in the mid-1950s Bruce Forsyth, who appeared over two seasons in 1955 and 1956. Other well-known names included David Nixon, Ted Rogers, Ray Allen, Norman Vaughan and Roy Hudd.

== Present day ==
Considered a valuable part of the Babbacombe and St Marychurch community, the venue works with other local attractions, retail and licensed establishments to promote the area. The theatre's season runs from mid-February to 1 January, with midweek shows throughout the year, and weekend shows during the holiday season. Acts appearing have included Frank Carson, Jethro, Colin Fry, The Bellydance Superstars, Jimmy Tarbuck, Kiki Dee, The Rubettes featuring Bill Hurd, Raymond Froggatt, Steven K Amos, Tim Vine, Des O'Connor, Acker Bilk, Kenny Ball, Elkie Brooks, Lenny Henry, Chuckle Brothers, Pam Ayres, Showaddywaddy, Jimmy Cricket and Brotherhood of Man.

The theatre has been owned and operated by Colin Matthews since 1986, and he is responsible for devising and directing all of the shows. The theatre encourages and develops up and coming talent, and hosted for five seasons the "Torbay’s Got Talent" live event from 2006 to 2011. Its 2011 show Heatwave featured two of the event's winners, Holly Cosgrove who won in 2009 and Stephanie Blackler, who won in 2010. In 2012, the show Stardust cast 5 members who first came to the attention of Colin Matthews through the Torbay's Got Talent platform. This season soprano singer, Keedie, who was a judge on Torbay's Got Talent in 2010 is taking centre stage in Spellbound.

In 2007, the venue's site became a part of the English Riviera Geopark. 2009 was the Babbacombe Theatre's 70th anniversary, and prior to the season opening in February, the venue's 600 seats were fully refurbished, including restoration of the original metalwork, and the original parquet floor which was stripped back and polished. The proscenium arch was rebuilt after the original asbestos was removed. 2011 marked Colin Matthews' 25th anniversary at the Babbacombe Theatre, with Heatwave his 50th production.
