= Grease: The School Musical =

- Genre: Reality Television
- Presented by: Duncan James
- Judges: Zoe Tyler; Stacey Haynes; Duncan James

Production
- Producer: Mentorn Media

Original release
- Network: Sky1
- Release: 30 August 2009 – 2009

Related
- Hairspray: The School Musical

Grease: The School Musical is a reality TV programme that appeared on British television at the end of August 2009 following on from the popular Hairspray: The School Musical. It was the result of a competition that started in 2008. The 1,000 schools were whittled down to 10 schools, then at this point filming started with the three judges (Zoe Tyler, Duncan James, and Stacey Haynes). There was then a competition and dance off with the final 3 schools (Shoeburyness High School, Great Barr School, and Wallasey School). Ray Quinn and Arlene Phillips appeared on the show as guests as well as Seth Rudeski.

In the end Wallasey school on the Wirral won.

The school went to London's West End to perform a shortened rehearsed version of Grease in the Novello theatre. They showed a series of one-hour shows and two added half-hour shows. The performance took place on 9 August 2009.

Many of the cast then went on to receive promotions to drama schools. The final show was viewed by 1 million people. Olivia Rae, a pupil from Wallasey School who took part in the musical, died in 2011 after contracting swine flu.
