= Angela Christian =

American actress and singer

Angela Christian is an American actress and singer.

== Career ==
Christian trained at the Boston Conservatory. In 2000, she made her Broadway debut as Lily in Richard Nelson's James Joyce's The Dead. In 2004, she made her West End debut creating the title role in Andrew Lloyd Webber's The Woman in White, directed by Trevor Nunn, which she then reprised on Broadway. Also on Broadway she created the role of Miss Dorothy Brown in Thoroughly Modern Millie, for which she was nominated for an Outer Critics Circle Award.

On television, Christian has appeared in episodes of Law & Order, House of Cards, and Unforgettable.

In 2017, Christian was set to co-produce the film Silver Wings with author Katherine Sharp Landdeck. The film was to be directed by her then-partner Thomas Kail.

In 2019, Christian played a First Order officer in Star Wars: The Rise of Skywalker.

== Personal life ==
Christian was born in Alabama and raised in San Antonio, Texas. She began a relationship with director Thomas Kail in 2006; they divorced in 2019.

== Filmography ==
=== Film ===
Year	Title	Role	Notes
2019	Star Wars: The Rise of Skywalker	First Order Officer	

=== Television ===
Year	Title	Role	Notes
2003	Law & Order: Criminal Intent	Kerry Harris	Episode: "Blink"
2011	Unforgettable	Allison Forrest	Episode: "Up in Flames"
2013	House of Cards	Leanne Masters	Episode: "Chapter 3"
2013	Law & Order: Special Victims Unit	April 'Ma' Hendricks	Episode: " Imprisoned Lives"
2014	Forever	Miranda Browning	Episode: "Look Before You Leap"

== Theatre ==
Year	Show	Role	Notes
2000	James Joyce's The Dead	Lily	Broadway debut, Belasco Theatre
2000	James Joyce's The Dead	Miss Molly Ivors	Washington, D.C., Kennedy Center
2002	Thoroughly Modern Millie	Miss Dorothy Brown	Broadway, Marquis Theatre
2004	The Woman in White	Anne Catherick	West End debut, Palace Theatre
2005	The Woman in White	Anne Catherick	Broadway, Marquis Theatre
2006	Anais Nin--One of Her Lives	Anaïs Nin	Off-Broadway, Beckett Theatre
2008	Bus Stop	Cherie	Ventura, California, Rubicon Theatre Company
2008	Two Rooms	Lanie	Off-Broadway, Lion Theatre

== Awards and nominations ==
Year	Award	Category	Nominated work	Result
2002	Outer Critics Circle Award	Outstanding Featured Actress – Musical	Thoroughly Modern Millie	Nominated
2005	WhatsOnStage Awards	Best Supporting Actress in a Musical	The Woman in White	Nominated
