= Tabberer =

Tabberer is a surname. Notable people with the surname include:

- Charles Arthur Tabberer (1915–1942), American naval officer
- Horace Tabberer Brown (1848–1925), British chemist
- Maggie Tabberer (1936–2024), Australian television personality
- Ralph Tabberer (born 1954), British civil servant

== See also ==
- Taberer, surname
