= Scream! If You Know the Answer =

- Presented by: Duncan James
- Narrated by: Colin Murray
- Country of origin: United Kingdom
- Original language: English
- No. of series: 3

Production
- Producer: Lion TV
- Running time: 30 minutes

Original release
- Network: Watch
- Release: 2 May 2010 – 10 June 2012

Scream! If You Know the Answer is a British game show presented by Duncan James and narrated by Colin Murray. The games are simple general knowledge, but they are played on the rides at theme park Thorpe Park. Contestants consist of two teams of two, one member of each team being a celebrity.

The show is one of the few original commissions by digital channel Watch.

The second series began on 8 May 2011. On 13 May 2012, they released a new series with a different name which is Scream Extreme.

== Celebrity participants ==
The celebrities who appeared in the first series of the show are:

- Cleo Rocos
- Phil Tufnell
- Ben Shephard
- Kyran Bracken
- Amir Khan
- Katie Price
- Rav Wilding
- Jennie Bond
- Anthea Turner
- Jeff Brazier
- Barry McGuigan
- Caroline Flack
- DJ Spoony
- Suzanne Shaw
- Tim Vine
- Gina Yashere
- Matt Willis
- Nathalie Emmanuel
- Iwan Thomas
- Angelica Bell

The celebrities who appeared in the second series of the show are:

- John Barrowman
- John Thomson
- Lee Ryan
- Simon Webbe
- Louie Spence
- Tamzin Outhwaite
- Joanna Page
- Jack Osbourne
- Jason Gardiner
- Denise van Outen
- Edwina Currie
- Neil Morrissey
- Joe Swash
- Vanilla Ice
- Dom Joly
- Kate Silverton
- Gavin Henson
- Michelle Collins
- Janice Dickinson
- Joe Calzaghe

== Games ==
The show has various games, but only four rounds are played each week. Below is a description of each game. In most rounds, the number of points per correct answer, or the number of points per second lasted is dictated by which number round it is. For example, a correct answer in round two will score two points, or lasting 14 seconds in round three will score 42 points.

Queasy as ABC – This involves each team having to ride either Colossus or Nemesis Inferno, while taking turns to give answers to a given category. These categories are usually quite simple, like 'Food' or 'Body Parts' for instance, however the players must provide answers in sequence for each letter of the alphabet as they go around. Points are given for each correct answer provided by the correct player.

Easier Said ... Than Spun – This round involves one player from each team riding the Slammer or Samurai spinning rides (or Zodiac in Series 2), while via an earpiece, their partner on the ground describes to them a series of everyday items being shown to them on flashcards. Points are scored for each correct answer given, according to the rules explained above, however on occasion, five points are awarded per correct answer, regardless of the round number.

Q and Aaaaargh! (originally Question and Aaaaargh!) – This round sees the host join the celebrity from each team on the SAW: The Ride or Nemesis Inferno roller coasters (or Samurai in series 2). As they go around, the host asks a series of quick-fire questions, with the first player to correctly answer scoring for their team.

Yes or No and Down You Go – This round sees the celebrity from each team being hoisted to the top of the Detonator tower ride with the non-celebrity from the other team. Once at the top of the tower, the celebrity must ask the non-celebrity a series of questions. Should the non-celebrity say 'Yes', 'No', or 'Maybe', the round ends, and they are dropped from the top of the tower. Points are scored based on how many seconds they remain at the top of the tower.

Pair Shaped – This round also takes place aboard the Detonator tower ride. While each team ascends the tower, they can see a 4x4 board of panels on the ground, containing 8 pairs of symbols. Once at the top of the tower, the board is turned over, with each of the 16 panels being numbered. They must then shout out two numbers of what they think are matching symbols. If they are incorrect, or take longer than ten seconds to provide an answer, they are dropped from the top of the tower. Points are scored for each correctly matched pair. If they successfully match all 8 pairs, they are dropped anyway.

Stop the Drop – Once again, this round takes place aboard the Detonator tower ride. Once at the top of the tower, taking turns, the teammates must name items from a given category. Should they provide an incorrect answer, or take longer than five seconds to provide an answer, they are dropped from the top of the tower. Points are awarded for each correct answer.

Twisty Listy – In this round, each team rides the Nemesis Inferno roller coaster. Before they start, they are given the beginning of a story, for example, 'I went to London and I saw ...'. As the ride gets underway, each team member take turns to add an item to the list, so for example, the first team member might say, 'I went to London and I saw an apple'. The other contestant could then say, 'I went to London and I saw an apple and a carrot', before the first team member would then repeat the sentence, adding a third item to the list. Points are awarded at the end of the round, based on how many items the team successfully added to their list. The adjudicators are fairly liberal with what answers are deemed correct in this round.

Sum Like It Not – This round involves the celebrity contingent of each team riding the Rush giant swing ride. While on the ride, the two non-celebrity teammates on the ground below hold up a series of large signs with fairly simple mathematical sums on them. The first celebrity contestant to shout out the correct answer scores for their team.

Retch-A-Sketch – In this round, the two members of each team sit opposite each other on the swinging, spinning Vortex ride. Once the ride is underway, the celebrity contestant is told an everyday item either via an earpiece or by the host who sometimes joins them on the ride. The celebrity must draw the everyday object on a small white-board, and then show it to their team member on the other side of the circle of seats. Each item the non-celebrity team member correctly guesses scores for their team.

Words of Whizzdom – This round also takes place on the swinging, spinning Vortex ride. One member from each team sits either side of the host, while on the opposite side of the circle of seats, eight people hold up a card with a letter on it. Once the ride is underway, taking turns, and with the host taking care of the timing, the two team members each have three periods of 15 seconds to name as many words as they can that can be made up from the eight letters on the cards. The minimum word length allowed is three letters, which scores three points, with four points for a four letter word (made up from the cards, not from their mouths) and so on. There is also one eight letter word, worth eight points, which can be made up from the letters. Any answers already given do not score.

Duncan's Donuts – This round sees the celebrity contestant ride the Samurai spinning ride, as their non-celebrity teammate asks them general knowledge questions from the ground below. The celebrity scores for their team for each correct answer they give, however, should they answer incorrectly, the non-celebrity must put a doughnut in their mouth. They can continue to ask their team-mate questions, but as their mouth fills with doughnuts it obviously becomes more difficult for the celebrity on the ride to understand what they are saying, and thus it becomes more difficult to score.

Stars in Their Cries – This round takes place on the Colossus or Nemesis Inferno roller coasters, and sees one team member name a famous person. The other team member must then take the first letter of that famous person's surname, and then name a famous person whose name starts with that letter. The team members carry on providing answers back and forth until the end of the ride, with points awarded for every correct answer, and double points for every famous person mentioned whose first name and surname begin with the same letter.

Rider's Block – Series 2. This round takes place on Colossus. Before the ride, the team is given a list of items related to a specific subject. As they travel on the ride, they must take it in turns to remember as much as the list as they can. The more items they get, the more points they score.

Barfta Spinning Performance – Series 2. This round takes place on Vortex. In a game of charades, the celebrity must describe a series of films without saying anything. The non-celebrity contestant must guess what it is, scoring 2 points for each correct answer.

Pop-Halarity Contest – Series 2. This round takes place on Detonator. The celebrity is on board the ride with the non-celebrity on the ground, blindfolded and having to ride a tricycle. The celebrity has to shout directions to them in order to burst as many water balloons in 60 seconds, scoring 5 points for each balloon bursted and a bonus 10 for the lot. When the time expires, the celebrity is dropped from the Detonator tower.

Nobody Does It Wetter – Series 2. This round takes place on the Tidal Wave flume. The non-celebrities must open 5 doors each to collect as many sponges as they can and stick them onto their celebrity teammate. The celebrities then ride the flume and then have to extract as much water as they collected. Two points are scored for per unit of water squeezed out.

Together In Electric Screams – Series 2. This round takes place on the Quantum carpet ride. The celebrity is on board the ride, balancing three cups of water and wired with electricity. The non-celebrity must complete as many circuits of a wire maze as they can, scoring 5 points for each successful crossing but losing 1 point for touching a wire and giving their celebrity an electric shock. Any water left over at the end of the ride earns bonus points.

Duncan James, You've Changed! – Series 2. This round takes place on Rush. The celebrity is on board the ride and the non-celebrity on the ground, there are two pictures of the host in a comical outfit on the ground, with 7 differences between them. Every time a celebrity spots a difference, they shout it out and the non-celebrity marks it with a giant pencil, scoring 2 points for each.

=== Final round ===
The team with the most points after four games are played goes through to play the final round called Cash Dash. This round takes place on Stealth or Saw – The Ride (series 2 premiere only), and sees each player in the team taking a separate ride on the attraction. As they travel the course (which only lasts around 15 seconds or so), they must name as many items from a given category as they can. After their partner has done the same, the non-celebrity contestant wins £500 for every matching answer. There is a maximum prize of £5000.

== International versions ==
On 29 May 2011, BuzzerBlog reported that the Travel Channel will be presenting a new version of the show for the United States.
