= Carolyn Maitland =

- Born: Carolyn Jane Maitland; 22 September 1983 (age 42); Cowes, Isle of Wight, England
- Education: Cowes High School; Elmhurst Ballet School
- Occupations: Actress, singer, dancer
- Years active: 2001–present
- Website: http://carolynmaitland.com

Carolyn Jane Maitland (born 22 September 1983) is a British actress, West End singer and performer best known for playing Marian Halcolme in The Woman in White at the Charing Cross Theatre in London, directed by Thom Southerland. Maitland is also known for playing Grace Farrell in the 2019 tour of Annie and Molly Jensen in Ghost, opposite Andy Moss as Sam, on the 2016 national tour.

== Personal life ==
She was born on the Isle of Wight and was educated at Cowes High School and now lives in London with her fiancé who she met during Mamma Mia!. She has one sister, who trained as a ballerina at the Royal Ballet School and runs her own dance school.

== Theatre career ==
Maitland trained at Elmhurst School of Dance and Performing Arts (formerly known as Elmhurst Ballet School). She started her career as an actor and dancer for Reach for the Moon for LWT and a backing dancer for the MOBO Awards in 2002 for ITV before working on Broadway Christmas Spectacular. She joined Spirit of the Dance/Broadway in 2003 for two years before becoming lead vocalist on the QE2.

In 2007 she joined the international tour of Mamma Mia!. The following year she was offered roles of covering Mabel, Serena, Miss Bell and swing on the UK tour of Fame. She was given her first lead understudy on the tour of High School Musical 2 as Gabriella.

In 2010 Maitland was offered the lead understudy role of Lucy Harris in the musical Jekyll & Hyde.

In 2012 she debuted her first West End show understudying the roles of Vivienne and Serena in Legally Blonde at the Savoy Theatre.

The following year she understudied Hannah Waddingham in the role of Lilli Vanessi/Katherine in Chichester Festival Theatre's 2012 revival of Kiss Me, Kate directed by Sir Trevor Nunn at The Old Vic. That led to creating the role of Rose and understudying Rebecca Thornhill in the role of Karen Holmes in From Here to Eternity at the Shaftesbury Theatre, London in 2013.

In May 2014 Maitland understudied Tamsin Carroll as Ellen Scott in the West End revival of Miss Saigon.

In 2015 Maitland starred in her first lead as Kathy Selden in Singin' in the Rainat Kilworth House Theatre.

Later that year she returned to Miss Saigon as Ellen Scott.

She went on to star as Sally Bowles in Cabaret at Aberdeen Arts Centre.

At the 2016 London premiere of Groundhog Day at The Old Vic, Maitland created the role of Joelle and understudied the part of Rita Hanson.

In January 2017 Maitland was cast to play alternate Alice and Mad Hatter in Wonderland: A New Alice, but pulled out before rehearsals due to contractual disagreements.

In 2017 Maitland took over the role as Molly in Ghost from Sarah Harding due to the injury Harding sustained on the third series of The Jump.

In October 2017 Maitland produced her first concert, Songs Chosen by You, for Live at Zedel.

In November 2017 she starred as Marian Halcolme in The Woman in White, with a revised score, which opened at the Charing Cross Theatre in London. Lyn Gardner of The Guardian wrote, "Carolyn Maitland sings with texture and gives the character definition." BroadwayWorld described Maitland's singing as "worth the ticket price alone".

Maitland joined the West End revival of Annie as Grace Farrell, which began at the Piccadilly Theatre in London before showing at the Ed Mirvish Theatre in Toronto, Canada.

Maitland continued playing Grace in the 2019 UK tour of Annie, opposite Anita Dobson, Lesley Joseph and Craig Revel-Horwood.

In 2020 she played Rebecca Hershkowitz in the Park Theatre's production of Rags, opposite Dave Willetts as Avram.

== Cast recordings ==
- From Here to Eternity
- Miss Saigon (2014 West End Revival Cast)

== Awards and nominations ==
- 2014 West End Frame Understudy Of The Year Award [winner]
- 2014 BroadwayWorld Understudy Of The Year Award [winner]
