= Keedie Babb =

British singer

Keedie Green
- Born: Keedie Babb; 21 October 1982 (age 44); Wolverhampton, England
- Origin: Paignton, England
- Genre: Classical crossover
- Occupation: Soprano singer
- Years active: 2003–present
- Website: www.keedie.info www.myspace.com/keediebabb

Keedie Green (née Babb, 21 October 1982) is a British classical crossover soprano with a vocal range of three octaves, reaching a top A above a top E.

== Background ==
She was named Keedie because her father is a fan of Kiki Dee. The family moved to Torquay when she was three years old. She attended White Rock Primary school in Paignton.

Her father worked intermittently as a painter and decorator, paying for his daughter's vocal lessons while narrowly avoiding bankruptcy, until one Christmas when bankruptcy made the family temporarily homeless. Keedie left school when she was 14 years old to pursue a singing career, signing her first record contract when she was 16 years old, but soon became disillusioned and left to pursue her career alone.

== Career ==
=== 2003–2005 ===
In 2003 Keedie appeared in a local Torquay talent show, "Stairway to the Stars"; this appearance brought her to fame. On 30 November 2003, Keedie performed at a World AIDS Day event at the Coronet theatre in London together with Liberty X in aid of Crusaid.

In 2004, Keedie signed a seven figure music deal with EMI Classics, after she duetted with former Blue member Duncan James, on "I Believe My Heart", the soundtrack to the Andrew Lloyd Webber Musical, The Woman in White. The single reached number two in the UK Singles Chart. She also performed at the Miami and Washington Film Festivals.

Her second single, a cover version of the hymn "Jerusalem", was released as a charity single in the UK on 18 December 2005, and entered the UK chart at #19. The single featured the victorious English cricket team who had just won the Ashes Test Series. Proceeds of the single were split equally between the Save the Children's "Children in Emergencies Appeal" and two cricket charities.

Her debut album I Believe My Heart was released on 18 November 2004, and met with positive reviews. It includes a variety of contemporary tracks and arrangements, and also featured the title theme "My Reason", from the film Modigliani; the video for which Keedie filmed on location in Bucharest. The album includes two pop covers: Madonna's "You'll See" and Enya's "Only Time", seven original songs and nine arias. After her album was released, Keedie went on to record Puccini's Nessun Dorma.

=== 2005–2006 ===
Keedie parted ways with her record company, EMI classics, at the end of 2005. During this time she was able to secure gigs at sporting events and celebrity private parties, such as Michael Parkinson and Anthea Turner. On 4 September 2005, she appeared at the Grand Finale of the Kent Music Festival along with Katherine Jenkins and G4.

On 26 February 2006, Keedie sang the National Anthem at the League Cup final at the Millennium Stadium in Cardiff. In May 2006, Keedie was asked to sing "Time to Say Goodbye" at former Newcastle United footballer Alan Shearer's testimonial at St James' Park. She performed the song after the game during the finale, and also performed earlier before the game.

=== 2007–present ===
In 2007, Keedie performed alongside Tina Turner in a one-off concert, The Bedrock Ball, in aid of the charity, Caudwell Children, at the National History Museum. It was the first live concert Tina Turner had performed in seven years. Keedie was the only artist to support Turner at the charity gig and she performed in front of celebrities such as Richard Hammond, Tara Palmer Tompkinson and David Gest.

Keedie said after the gig:

It was probably one of the most amazing nights I have ever seen. It was mind-blowing. I have never seen anything like it. There was so many celebrities there. When I performed I had a standing ovation and Tina's bouncer told me she had been watching me and had said I was phenomenal. It was really nerve-wracking.

Keedie was then invited to sing before David Beckham's first match for Los Angeles Galaxy in the United States. She was also booked for a private party for George Clooney and another charity gig in Moscow which was organised by Nelson Mandela.

In May 2007, a special charity album entitled KN21 was released in aid of Children's Hospice South-West. The album consisted of live recordings of Keedie and her sister Nadine from 1993 – when they were 11 and 10 years old, and called themselves KN21 – a name using the first initials of their names plus their combined age at the time. The tracks are mainly covers from the 1960s which were recorded during the girls "Swinging Sixties" show at the Great Western Hotel in Paignton. The album also has two exclusive bonus tracks which Keedie recorded in 2005 – "Nessun Dorma" and "Would I Know", an original song penned by American songwriter, Diane Warren, and previously used in the Charlotte Church film I'll Be There.

Keedie recorded with OMD in 2009. In 2010, it was revealed that she had auditioned for The X Factor under her marital name of Keedie Green, but did not go through to the judges' houses round.

In February 2013, Keedie performed at the Babbacombe Theatre, Torquay, in their summer season production Spellbound.

During 2015, she appeared on the BBC One talent show The Voice UK, resulting in over 2.7 million YouTube views; also in 2015 Keedie appeared in the World War II Romance film Meet Again as the Garden Singer - Hollywood Gem.

From 2016–2018, she further starred in productions at the Babbacombe Theatre. July 2018 saw her perform to good reviews in the West End London Peacock Theatre show TriOperas.

In 2020, she delivered a singing master class to performing arts students of South Devon College and took part in a fund raising virtual concert at Wrexham radio station Calon FM on behalf of the National Health Service front line workers who had contributed so much during the COVID-19 pandemic.

== Discography ==
=== Albums ===
- I Believe My Heart (2004)

=== Singles ===
- "I Believe My Heart" (2004) (duet with Duncan James) – UK #2
- "Jerusalem" (2005) (with the England Cricket Team) – UK #19
