= Sooner or Later (Duncan James song) =

2006 single by Duncan James

Single by Duncan James

from the album Future Past
- Released: 5 June 2006
- Genre: Pop
- Length: 3:45
- Label: Innocent
- Songwriters: Chris Braide; Jez Ashurst; Duncan James
- Producer: Stephen Lipson

Duncan James singles chronology
| "I Believe My Heart" (2004) | "Sooner or Later" (2006) | "Can't Stop a River" (2006) |

"Sooner or Later" is a song by English singer Duncan James. It was written by James, Chris Braide and Jez Ashurst for James' debut solo album, Future Past (2006), while production was helmed by Stephen Lipson. The song was released as the album's lead single on 5 June 2006 and is James' debut solo single after 2004's duet "I Believe My Heart". "Sooner or Later" peaked at number 35 on the UK Singles Chart and found success in Italy peaking at number three.

== Track listings ==
UK CD single
| No. | Title | Length |
|---|---|---|
| 1. | "Sooner or Later" (Radio Version) | 3:44 |
| 2. | "This Day" | 3:46 |

UK DVD single
| No. | Title | Length |
|---|---|---|
| 1. | "Sooner or Later" (Video) | 3:44 |
| 2. | "Behind the Scenes Footage" (Album Photo Shoot in Morocco) | 2:00 |
| 3. | "Behind the Scenes Footage" (Video Shoot in Miami) | 2:00 |
| 4. | "Sooner or Later" (Instrumental) | 3:44 |

== Charts ==
=== Weekly charts ===
| Chart (2006) | Peak position |
|---|---|
| Belgium (Ultratip Bubbling Under Flanders) | 2 |
| Greece (IFPI) | 41 |
| Italy (FIMI) | 3 |
| Italy (Musica e dischi) | 7 |
| Scottish Singles Sales (Official Charts) | 19 |
| UK Singles (Official Charts) | 35 |
| UK Airplay (Music Week) | 43 |

=== Year-end charts ===
| Chart (2006) | Position |
|---|---|
| Italy (FIMI) | 37 |
