= Still Waters (Louise Setara album) =

Studio album by Louise Setara
- Released: 12 September 2006 (U.S.); 5 February 2007 (UK)
- Recorded: 2004–2006
- Genre: Pop, soul
- Length: 52:18
- Label: Manhattan Records / EMI
- Producer: Anthony Clark; Simon Hill; Chris Porter; Peter Gordeno; Simon Climie

Alternative cover
- U.S. cover

Still Waters is the debut album by British singer Louise Setara. The album, a mix of pop and soul, was released on 12 September 2006 in the U.S. and 5 February 2007 in the UK. The album contains the three singles "Can't Stop the River", "Wrong Again" and "Love Me Still". "Love Me Still" is a cover originally by Chaka Khan from the Clockers soundtrack. Another cover on the album is "Make You Feel My Love", by Bob Dylan.

== Track listing ==
1. "Love Me Still"
2. "By the Time"
3. "Make You Feel My Love"
4. "Homeless"
5. "Wrong Again"
6. "Too Soon"
7. "Circle"
8. "Can't Stop the River"
9. "Sylvie"
10. "Let It Be Me"
11. "I Can Hurt"
12. "If I Should Fall"
13. "Ain't Gonna Let You Break My Heart Again"
14. "One Fine Day" (UK bonus track)
