= Help Me =

Help Me may refer to:

== Songs ==
- "Help Me" (Alkaline Trio song), 2008
- "Help Me" (J. R. Bailey song), 1966
- "Help Me" (Joni Mitchell song), 1974
- "Help Me" (Larry Gatlin song), a song first covered by Kris Kristofferson in 1972
- "Help Me" (Nick Carter song), 2002
- "Help Me" (Real Boston Richey song), 2024
- "Help Me" (Sonny Boy Williamson II song), a 1963 blues standard first recorded by Sonny Boy Williamson II
- "Help Me" (Tinchy Stryder song), 2012
- "Help Me", a song by Chris Brown from his 2007 album Exclusive
- "Help Me", a song by Demi Lovato featuring Dead Sara from the album Holy Fvck
- "Help Me", a song by Deuce from the album Nine Lives
- "Help Me", a song by E-40 from his 2012 album The Block Brochure: Welcome to the Soil 1
- "Help Me!", by Marcy Levy and Robin Gibb, 1980
- "Help Me!!", by Morning Musume, 2013
- "Help Me", a song by English musician Bryan Ferry written and recorded for the 1986 film The Fly

== Other uses ==
- "Help Me" (House), the sixth-season finale of House

== See also ==
- Help (disambiguation)
- "Help Me, Rhonda", a 1965 single by The Beach Boys
