= Can't Stop the River =

Single by Louise Setara

from the album Still Waters
- Released: 2006
- Songwriters: Seal, Peter Gordeno

Louise Setara singles chronology
"Can't Stop the River" (2006)	"Love Me Still" (2007)

"Can't Stop the River" is a song written by Seal and Peter Gordeno, and was originally recorded in 2006 by Louise Setara. After Duncan James' version was released first commercially in June 2006, Setara's version was then released a few months later as her debut single. The song appears on her debut album, Still Waters released in September 2006.

== Duncan James version ==
"Can't Stop a River"

Single by Duncan James

from the album Future Past
- Released: 21 August 2006
- Length: 3:53
- Label: Innocent
- Songwriters: Seal; Peter Gordeno
- Producer: Stephen Lipson

Duncan James singles chronology
"Sooner or Later" (2006)	"Can't Stop a River" (2006)	"Amazed" (2007)

Duncan James recorded his version of the song, retitled "Can't Stop a River", and it was released on 21 August 2006 as the second single from his debut solo album, Future Past. The song peaked at number 59 on the UK Singles Chart.

=== Track listing ===
UK CD single

1. "Can't Stop a River" – 3:52
2. "You Can" – 3:55

UK CD single 2

1. "Can't Stop a River" – 3:52
2. "Part Time Love" – 4:03
3. "Simple Love Song" – 3:14
4. "Can't Stop a River" (Video) – 3:52
5. "Can't Stop a River" (Behind the Scenes) – 2:00

=== Charts ===
Chart (2006)	Peak position
Italy (FIMI)	23
Italy (Musica e dischi)	38
UK Singles (Official Charts)	59

== Other versions ==
Guy Sebastian recorded the song for his 2006 album Closer to the Sun.
