= Phil Clifton =

British television and radio presenter

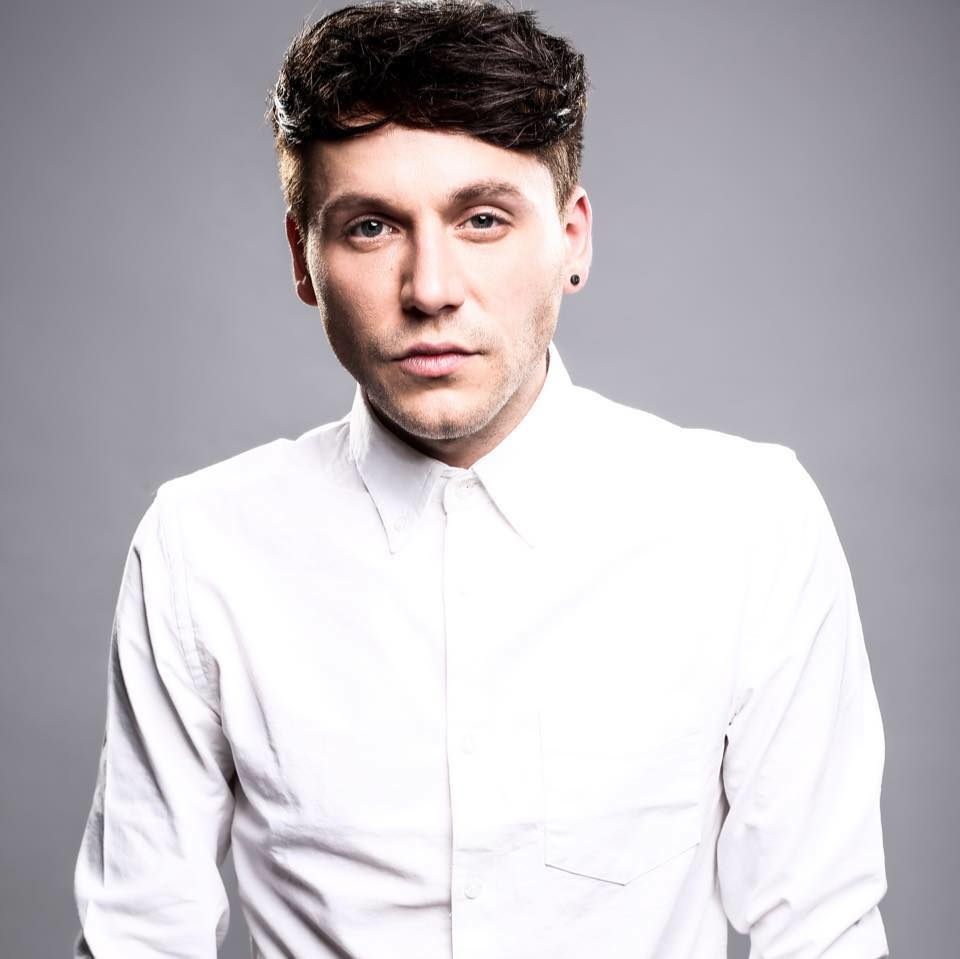
- Phil Clifton
- Born: 20 April 1984 (age 42); York, England
- Years active: 2009 – present
- Known for: television, radio

Phil Clifton is a British television and Sony nominated radio presenter, appearing on MTV (UK and Ireland), Radio X and formerly Channel 4.

== Career ==
=== Radio ===
Phil began presenting on Xfm London and Xfm Manchester in 2008. He was later nominated for a 'Sony Rising Star award' for his work on the station. Phil joined Radio X, right across the UK as part of a national relaunch for the station, hosting the evening show on weekdays from 19:00-22:00. He left Radio X in early 2017. Phil later appeared on Hits Radio briefly and joined the presenting team of Virgin Radio UK PRIDE in 2021.

=== Television ===
Clifton has also presented for MTV UK and Ireland, including his regular weekly show The Official UK Rock Chart.

Clifton hosted Don't Stop Believing Backstage for Channel 5, along with an official catch-up show on Myspace.

Phil later joined the presenting team on Freshly Squeezed, a music programme shown on Channel 4.

Clifton was featured in the Red Pages 'Hot 100 to look out for' list.

He has hosted the official Online and National radio content for the 2012 Brit Awards and the regional finals of the L'Oréal 'Hair Colour Trophy' awards, among other things.
