= Dr. Henry's Emergency Lessons for People =

Dr. Henry's Emergency Lessons for People (a.k.a. H.E.L.P.! — Dr. Henry's Emergency Lessons for People) is a series of animated television shorts that served as public service announcements, aimed at children. Created and produced by writer and lyricist Lynn Ahrens and named for and inspired by the work of contributor Dr. Henry Heimlich, who was listed as medical consultant. These one-minute shorts debuted during the 1979–1980 television season and broadcast throughout the early 1980s in the US on ABC during commercial breaks on Saturday mornings when youngsters were tuned in to Saturday morning cartoons and similar children's programming. H.E.L.P.! won an Emmy Award in 1980.

Each short presents a central character experiencing an injury (often minor, but not always), then Dr. Henry would demonstrate and explain the proper way to initially handle care for it. First aid was demonstrated for practical purposes. Each short presents a central character experiencing a minor injury and the proper way to initially handle care for it. Examples are small cut or a burn (such as by scalding), including second and third degree burns.

The shorts feature exaggerated cartoon style similar to most Saturday morning cartoon entertainment. This was designed by Rowland Wilson and provided by Phil Kimmelman and Associates. The production company for H.E.L.P. was Dahlia Productions. Eight shorts were created.
