= Help (2021 theatrical film) =

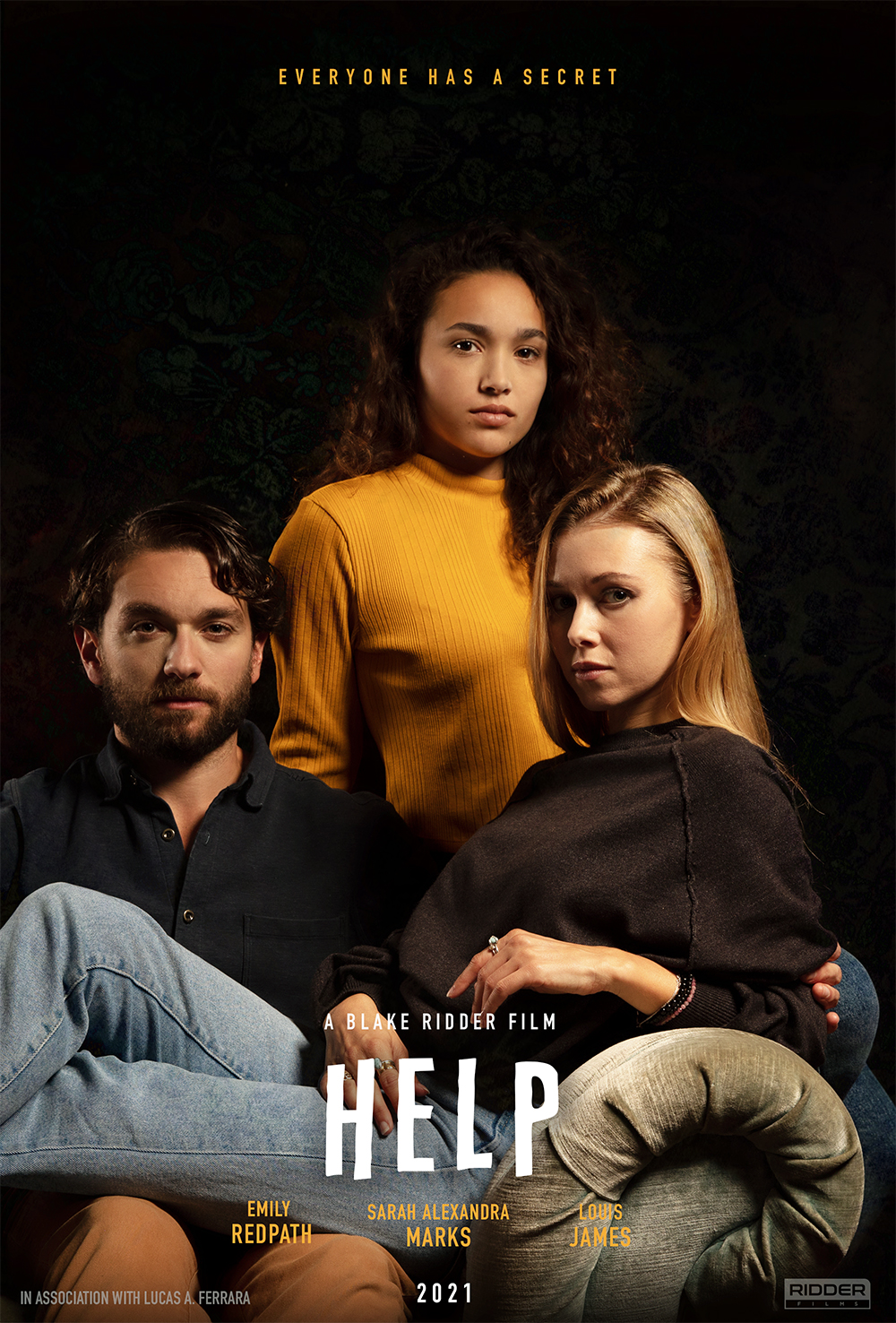
- Official Poster
- Directed by: Blake Ridder
- Written by: Blake Ridder
- Produced by: Louis James; Blake Ridder
- Starring: Emily Redpath; Sarah Alexandra Marks; Louis James; Duncan James; Blake Ridder
- Cinematography: Samuel Pearce
- Edited by: Blake Ridder
- Music by: Ruth Chan
- Production company: Ridder Films
- Release date: March 2021 (Cinequest)
- Running time: 95 minutes
- Country: United Kingdom
- Language: English
- Budget: £40,000

Help is a 2021 British psychological thriller film written and directed by Blake Ridder, produced in association with Lucas A. Ferrara. The film stars Emily Redpath, Sarah Alexandra Marks, Louis James, Duncan James and Blake Ridder.

== Plot ==
A painful break up prompts Grace to visit her friend Liv who is living in the idyllic English countryside with her boyfriend Edward and his dog Polly. The trio start the weekend in high spirits but soon turns into chaos, as well-kept secrets are exposed and the friends come to see each other in a whole new light.

== Cast ==
- Emily Redpath as Grace
- Sarah Alexandra Marks as Liv
- Louis James as Edward
- Duncan James as Jogger
- Blake Ridder as David
- Stuart Wolfe-Murray as Chris
- Amy Jim as Barbara

== Production ==
Help was shot in a single location over a period of twelve days in 2020, during the COVID-19 lockdown.

== Release ==
Help premiered at Cinequest film festival in March 2021 and was shown at the Fisheye Film Festival the following month.

It was released on digital download on 15 February 2022.

Ridder uploaded the film to his YouTube channel on 19 March 2026.

== Reception ==
Film Threat reviewed Help, writing that "Be patient with the plot, including a story of a lesbian encounter that seems only to exist to be provocative. It’s there for a reason and plays into the ultimate payoff at the end. It’s worth the wait." Starburst also reviewed the movie, stating that it "plays well as a melodrama, but also has enough going for it to recommend to fans of psychological thrillers."
