= I Believe My Heart (song) =

2004 single by Duncan James and Keedie Babb

Single by Duncan James and Keedie

from the album I Believe My Heart
- Released: 11 October 2004
- Length: 3:56
- Label: EMI; Virgin
- Composer: Andrew Lloyd Webber
- Lyricist: David Zippel
- Producer: Christopher Neil

Duncan James singles chronology
"I Believe My Heart" (2004)	"Sooner or Later" (2006)

Keedie singles chronology
"I Believe My Heart" (2004)	"Jerusalem" (2005)

"I Believe My Heart" is a duet between Duncan James of English boy band Blue and British soprano Keedie Babb. The song was James' first release as a solo artist, shortly before Blue went on hiatus. The song was written by David Zippel (lyrics) and Andrew Lloyd Webber (music) for use in the Lloyd Webber musical The Woman in White, which premiered the same year. Upon its release in October 2004, the single debuted and peaked at number two on the UK Singles Chart. Outside the UK, the song reached the top 20 in Italy and also charted in Belgium, Germany, Ireland, and Switzerland.

== Music video ==
The video for the song, set in the grounds of a stately home with a maze, features Duncan James and Keedie dressed in wedding attire and looking for each other in the maze, including at nightfall. During the last section of the song, James and Keedie have found each other beneath a large oak tree.

== Track listings ==
UK CD1

1. "I Believe My Heart" – 3:56
2. "I Believe My Heart" (instrumental) – 3:56
3. "I Believe My Heart" (video) – 3:56

UK CD2, European and Japanese CD single

1. "I Believe My Heart" – 3:56
2. "I Believe My Heart" (instrumental) – 3:56

== Charts ==
=== Weekly charts ===
Chart (2004)	Peak position
Belgium (Ultratip Bubbling Under Flanders)	16
Europe (Eurochart Hot 100)	8
Germany (GfK)	67
Ireland (IRMA)	29
Italy (FIMI)	13
Italy (Musica e dischi)	7
Scottish Singles Sales (Official Charts)	3
Switzerland (Schweizer Hitparade)	49
UK Singles (Official Charts)	2

=== Year-end charts ===
Chart (2004)	Position
UK Singles (OCC)	93

== Release history ==
Region	Date	Format(s)	Label(s)	Ref.
United Kingdom	11 October 2004	CD	EMI; Virgin	
Japan	15 December 2004	CD	EMI; Virgin	
