= Donna Taberer =

British television producer

Donna Taberer (born 30 November 1964) is a British television producer and former head of entertainment at Channel 5.

== Early life ==
She was born in East Sussex. She attended grammar school in East Sussex.

== Career ==
She began as a journalist at the age of 18, and trained on the NCTJ course.

=== BBC ===
She joined the BBC in 1990 as a researcher on That's Life!. She worked in factual programmes and factual entertainment as an executive producer. She oversaw the Children's Party at the Palace in 2006.

She rejoined the BBC in September 2010.

=== BSkyB ===
From 2006 to 2009 she was in charge of commissioning entertainment on Sky 1, Sky 2 and Sky 3.

=== Five ===
In August 2009 she joined Five as their head of Entertainment, where she stayed for a year.

=== BBC Academy ===
In September 2010, Taberer joined the BBC Academy where she is head of public service partnerships; the Academy includes, among other initiatives, a media training program for journalists and other experts aimed at helping to achieve gender parity on television.

== See also ==
- Richard Woolfe, former Channel control of Five from 2009

Media offices
| Preceded by | Head of Entertainment Commissioning (Five); August 2009 - September 2010 | Succeeded by |
| Preceded by | Commissioner: Entertainment and Features (Sky 1, 2 and 3); 2006 - 2009 | Succeeded by |
| Preceded by | Deputy Controller of Factual (BBC); 2005 - 2006 | Succeeded by |
