= Help (Australian TV series) =

Australian television series

- Genre: Reality, Medical
- Developed by: Kudos Films
- Country of origin: Australia
- No. of seasons: 1
- No. of episodes: 6

Production
- Production locations: Sydney, Australia
- Running time: 30 minutes

Original release
- Network: SBS One
- Release: 12 July – 23 August 2006

Related
- Inside Australia, Storyline Australia

Help (styled as HELP) is a six-part Australian documentary series is broadcast on SBS One covering events that ambulance officers and paramedics face while on the job.

== Production ==
Guy Mansfield directed, wrote, and produced Help. Frank Martin was the show's camera person. Help has six episodes. It features parademics who wear cameras attached to their hats. They had two additional handheld cameras to record from various perspectives. The filming largely took place at night.

== Reception ==
Hailing Help as a "brilliant" show, The Weekend Australian writer Kerrie Murphy found it to be "an insight into the demanding life of paramedics and the distressing plight of emergency victims". Stephen Downie and John Spence of The Sunday Telegraph called Help a "well-made doco series" that is "compelling TV". The Age critic Larissa Dubecki said the series has "rapid-fire editing, creative angles, urgent music" and is "an old-fashioned rendition of the best and worst of human nature".

== Episodes ==
The series was first transmitted in Australia from 12 July to 23 August 2006. A total of six episodes were filmed, no further episodes have been announced.

| # | Title | Air date | Synopsis |
|---|---|---|---|
| 1 | HELP Episode 1 | 12 July 2006 | Norm, an experienced and seasoned paramedic, must console staff and residents when an emergency in a retirement village results in death. Paramedic Audie and Ambulance Officer James deal with culturally sensitive issues when called to assist an elderly Chinese man. Paul is on the scene after a young inebriated man is 'glanced' by a car. Audie's team is called in again when a young mother has difficulty delivering twins. |
| 2 | HELP Episode 2 | 19 July 2006 | Motorcycle paramedic Kirk is called to a man suffering exposure after a steep fall from an embankment. Audie and Ben are required to apply CPR to a man found collapsed at the wheel of his car. And Audie and James are called to attend to an elderly lady suffering chest pains. A young man drove into a telegraph pole and suffers temporary memory loss when Lindsay and Leanne arrive at the scene of the accident. The call comes into Audie and Ben to attend a "male with lacerations and bleeding". It turns out to be a minor cut, but they treat the patient with care and respect. |
| 3 | HELP Episode 3 | 26 July 2006 | Norm in his Rapid Response vehicle is on his way to a country property where two men have fallen from a roof into an empty water tank. He must assess the damage quickly and call in the helicopter service to airlift the victims to hospital. Audie and James tend to a long-term smoker with breathing difficulties and anxiety. Paul and his partner tend to a young mum who is pregnant and bleeding; while keeping her young son amused during the trip to hospital. A young female is knocked off her motorbike on a highway. Lindsay and Leanne are first on the scene and suspect spinal injuries. |
| 4 | HELP Episode 4 | 2 August 2006 | Norm, from Rapid Response, is called to a busy bus terminal when a 91-year-old woman falls off the bus, knocking her head. A cheeky exchange assures Norm she will be fit and well for her 92nd birthday. A man is pinned in the seat of his car after slamming into a pole. Paul and Sandy help with his release and attend to his injuries. Then it's off to the result of a fight outside an inner-city pub where a young tourist has been roughed up. Lindsay and Leanne are called to a young male suffering a stab wound and on his motorcycle, Kirk rushes to the Art Gallery when a man is reported to have collapsed. |
| 5 | HELP Episode 5 | 9 August 2006 | Paul and Ryan are called to the scene of an accident when the driver of a truck is trapped in the cabin. When the Vital Call button of a 92-year-old man has been pressed, Norm is called to locate the man. Audie and James attend a hit-and-run accident when a young girl is knocked down outside her home, suffering a broken leg and damaged pelvis. Then it's off to another elderly man suffering emphysema, chest pains and breathing problems. Audie and Ben are there to help a young boy who has been thrown from his motorbike over a car and onto the road. His main concern is if he will be well enough to get to a Delta Goodrem concert on the weekend. |
| 6 | HELP Episode 6 | 23 August 2006 | Kirk is called to a busy shopping centre when a lady suffering from diabetes collapses, dangerously close to lapsing into a diabetic coma. The next call is for Norm, there has been a stabbing in a suburban house. Audie and Ben attend another man with emphysema, who is struggling to breathe. A young driver on a rainy night has hit a pedestrian. After immediately assessing the status of the pedestrian, Audie and Ben must console the distressed driver. |
