= The Help (soundtrack) =

2011 albums

The Help (Music from the Motion Picture)

Soundtrack album by Various artists
- Released: August 4, 2011
- Genre: Pop; contemporary R&B; contemporary classical; western
- Length: 36:04
- Label: Geffen; DreamWorks; UMG
- Producer: Thomas Newman; Tate Taylor
- Compiler: Jennifer Hawks

The Help (Original Motion Picture Score)

Film score by Thomas Newman
- Released: September 6, 2011
- Recorded: 2011
- Studio: Newman Scoring Stage
- Genre: Film score
- Length: 59:34
- Label: Varèse Sarabande
- Producer: Bill Bernstein; Thomas Newman

The Help is a 2011 period comedy-drama film written and directed by Tate Taylor and based on Kathryn Stockett's 2009 novel of the same name. The film features an ensemble cast, including Jessica Chastain, Viola Davis, Bryce Dallas Howard, Allison Janney, Octavia Spencer, and Emma Stone. Two soundtrack albums were released for the film: an original soundtrack and an original score. Music producer Thomas Newman, music supervisor Jennifer Hawks, director Tate Taylor, worked on both the soundtracks as the executive producer, while Newman also composed the film score. The soundtrack album was released by Geffen Records (a subsidiary of Universal Music Group) and DreamWorks Records on August 4, 2011, while Varèse Sarabande released the score album on September 6.

Both the soundtracks and score were announced, months earlier before the release. The album and the score were heavily inspired on the music of 1960s and features songs from the likes of Johnny Cash, Frankie Valli and Ray Charles. An original song for the film "The Living Proof" performed by Mary J. Blige was released as a single on July 5, 2011, and was nominated for Golden Globe Award for Best Original Song.

== Background ==
Thomas Newman began composing the film score in March 2011, following his involvement in the project. Owing to the setting and storyline, music supervisor Jennifer Hawks, who worked as an executive producer in DreamWorks Pictures, had selected songs that had resonated to 1960s. The tracks were rendered by prominent artists such as Johnny Cash and June Carter, Dorothy Norwood, Bo Diddley, Ray Charles, The Orlons, Bob Dylan, Mavis Staples, Frankie Valli from the Four Seasons band and Chubby Checker. As a collective, the songs spotlight the peak of the fight for equality in the United States during the civil rights movement.

The only original song written for the film, was "The Living Proof", which was written and sung by Mary J. Blige and composed by Thomas Newman. The song was created after Blige watched the film twice at a private theatre and felt impressed, and emotional after watching. She stated "I cried really hard, I laughed really hard, I got angry, and I went through all kinds of different things. I typed all those things into my phone, and by the time I got to the studio to write the song, it was almost basically written." She called the song in honor of the characters’ resilience and ability to forgive.

== Track listing ==
=== Soundtrack ===
The Help (Music from the Motion Picture)

No.	Title	Performers	Length
1.	"The Living Proof"	Mary J. Blige	5:57
2.	"Jackson"	Johnny Cash and June Carter	5:28
3.	"Sherry"	Frankie Valli	5:35
4.	"I Ain't Never"	Webb Pierce	1:56
5.	"Victory Is Mine"	Dorothy Norwood	3:47
6.	"Road Runner"	Bo Diddley	2:48
7.	"Hallelujah I Love Her So"	Ray Charles	2:35
8.	"The Wah-Watusi"	The Orlons	2:32
9.	"Personality"	Lloyd Price	10:29
10.	"Don't Think Twice, It's All Right"	Bob Dylan	3:38
11.	"Let's Twist Again"	Chubby Checker	2:19
12.	"Don't Knock"	Mavis Staples	2:30

=== Score ===
The Help (Original Motion Picture Score)

No.	Title	Length
1.	"Aibilene"	3:07
2.	"Them Fools"	2:50
3.	"Upside-Down Cake"	1:22
4.	"Mississippi"	3:50
5.	"Heart Palpitations"	1:43
6.	"The Help"	2:19
7.	"Jim Crow"	1:45
8.	"Skeeter"	1:03
9.	"Miss Hilly"	1:14
10.	"Write That Down"	1:38
11.	"Bottom Of The List"	3:23
12.	"Deviled Eggs"	2:03
13.	"First White Baby"	2:00
14.	"Celia Digs"	2:06
15.	"November 22"	1:12
16.	"Not To Die"	1:28
17.	"My Son"	2:51
18.	"Trash On The Road"	1:37
19.	"The Terrible Awful"	2:57
20.	"Constantine"	4:09
21.	"Gripping Testimonials"	1:32
22.	"Sugar"	1:50
23.	"Amen"	3:06
24.	"Mile High Meringue"	2:00
25.	"Ain't You Tired (End Title)"	6:29

The Help (For Your Consideration)

1. Opening / Abie & Skeeter
2. Toilet Paper
3. Constantine's Advice
4. Book Approved
5. Storm / Minnie Fired
6. You My Real Mam
7. Minnie Phone Call
8. It Fee
9. First White Baby
10. Sugar
11. Celia Meets Minnie
12. Eula May Ring / Abie & Skeeter
13. Minnie Joins Up
14. Skeeter Truck To Date
15. Kill My Son / Shower
16. Kitchen Standoff / Coats
17. Spank / Evers / Bus
18. Celia Digs / Arrest
19. Lots Of Maids / Stories
20. Funeral / Love You
21. Terrible Awful
22. Celia & Minnie Talk
23. Firing Constantine / Braid Bookstore
24. Skeeter & Mom Make Up
25. Celia Food For Minnie
26. Church Applause / Can't Leave
27. Ain't You Tired

== Reception ==
Reviewing for both the musical score and soundtrack, James Christopher Monger of AllMusic wrote for the former, saying: "the soundtrack, a 12-track collection of oldies, classic country and R&B dutifully mirrors the heydays of the civil rights movement", and for the score: "Newman's sweet/sad and pastoral score stands up perfectly well on its own, brandishing its own distinct shade of Americana that manages to incorporate the whole melting pot, rather than just skim off the top." 'A review published by The Joy of Movies said: "Like a lot of Thomas Newman’s other works, the score for The Help runs on the slightly more minimalist side. The simple melodies are memorable throughout and pleasant to listen to. The recurring themes are quite nicely developed and there are interesting wind instrument elements throughout, along with the likes of piano, guitar, and strings. Ultimately, with an appropriate mix between more serious and lighter tones, it works."

A review published by Filmtracks.com said: "The Help is an effectively competent score that once again proves Newman a master of expressing convincing tones for America's Deep South. It doesn't have the infectious personality or melodic exposition of an enduring benchmark like Fried Green Tomatoes, but its respectful sense of restraint is admirable. The hour-long album presentation is absent source material and is a mostly tonal, effortless listening experience that will be a pleasure to appreciate for those seeking to hear Newman return to his early 1990s sensibilities, even if it does manifest itself in the form of somber, atmospheric grace." Collider's Natasha McMeekin wrote: "The Help catches us off guard at times: it often switches from moments of humor and light-heartedness to moments of utter dejection, despair, and complete discomfort. Unsurprisingly, Newman understands this and works in tandem with the film's ever-changing shift in tone. The feel-good moments possess an upbeat cadence and whimsy that make us laugh along when our beloved characters experience precious moments of mirth. However, Newman shines in moments where performances and emotions become raw and thought-provoking. His suspension of gorgeous strings, and slow but poignant melodies, never outshine the characters in these moments."

== Release history ==
Region	Date	Label	Catalog Code	Ref.
The Help (Music from the Motion Picture)
United States	August 4, 2011	Geffen; DreamWorks	B001585402	
Canada	August 10, 2011	Universal Music Canada	B001585402	
Europe	August 15, 2011	Universal Music Group	0602527872155	
The Help (Original Motion Picture Score)
United States	September 6, 2011	Varèse Sarabande	3020671142	
Germany	September 13, 2011	Varèse Sarabande	VSD-7114	

== Accolades ==
Award	Date	Category	Recipients and nominees	Result
BMI Film & TV Awards	May 17, 2012	Film Music Award	Thomas Newman	Won
Broadcast Film Critics Association Awards	January 12, 2012	Best Song	"The Living Proof"	Nominated
Golden Globe Awards	January 15, 2012	Best Original Song	"The Living Proof" (Thomas Newman, Mary J. Blige, Harvey Mason, Jr. and Damon Thomas)	Nominated
Houston Film Critics Society Awards	December 13, 2011	Best Song	"The Living Proof"	Nominated
