= Heat escape lessening position =

Human position to reduce heat loss in water

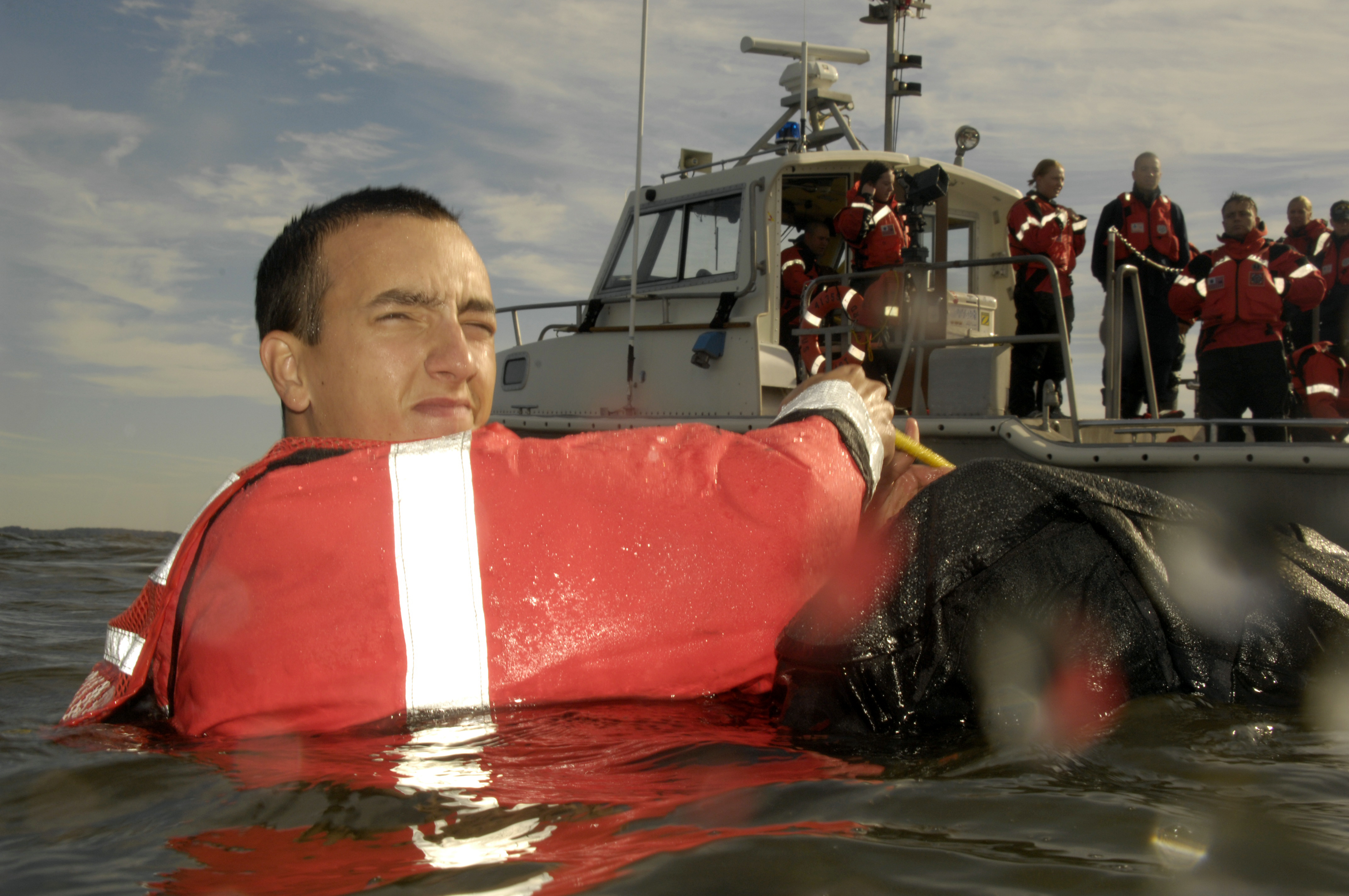
A U.S. Coast Guard member demonstrating the heat escape lessening position during a cold water exercise.

The heat escape lessening position or heat escape lessening posture (HELP) is a human position to reduce heat loss while immersed in cold water.

== Position ==
HELP is taught as part of the curriculum in Australia, North America, and Ireland for lifeguard and boating safety training. It involves positioning one's knees together and hugging them close to the chest using one's arms. Furthermore, groups of people can huddle together in this position to conserve body heat, offer moral support, and provide a larger target for rescuers.

The HELP is an attempt to reduce heat loss enough to lessen the effect of hypothermia. Hypothermia is a condition where bodily temperature drops too low to perform normal voluntary or involuntary functions. Cold water causes "immersion hypothermia", which can cause damage to extremities or the body's core, including unconsciousness or death.

The HELP reduces exposure of high heat loss areas of the body. Wearing a personal flotation device allows a person to draw their knees to their chest and arms to their sides, while still remaining able to breathe.

== History ==
The HELP was coined by John Hayward in his publication of "Man in Cold Water: A Brief Presentation on Cold Water Safety" in 1973. In his research, Hayward found that the lateral thorax and groin were important regions in regard to body heat loss. Using HELP to cover these "thermovulnerable" body parts helps to extend survival time. Hayward found that by using the HELP, the rate of cooling of human bodies in cold water was reduced by about 1/3.

== See also ==
- Huddling
