= Help Remedies =

American Pharmaceutical Company

One of the products sold by Help Remedies, acetaminophen.

Help Remedies, Inc. is an American pharmaceutical company, founded by Richard Fine and Nathan Frank in 2008, based in New York City that sells an assortment of single-ingredient over-the-counter medications. The company has been noted for its unique product packaging and design ethic. All products are packaged in a flat, white, textured box that opens like a tin.

Help Remedies products treat medical conditions such as nausea, headache or insomnia.

In 2011, the company reached $4 million in sales and plans to expand to San Francisco, Seattle, Portland, Oregon, Austin, Texas, Chicago, and Miami.
