= The Woman in White (musical) =

- Original London cast recording
- Music: Andrew Lloyd Webber
- Lyrics: David Zippel
- Book: Charlotte Jones
- Basis: The Woman in White by Wilkie Collins
- Productions: 2004 West End; 2005 Broadway; 2017 West End revival

The Woman in White is a musical with music by Andrew Lloyd Webber, lyrics by David Zippel, and a book by Charlotte Jones. It is based on the 1860 novel by Wilkie Collins, as well as on elements of the 1866 short story "The Signal-Man" by Charles Dickens.

It ran for nineteen months in the West End and three months on Broadway, making it one of Lloyd Webber's shortest-running shows.

== Production history ==
=== West End ===
The musical was produced in a workshop at Lloyd Webber's Sydmonton Festival (Hampshire, England) in July 2003.

The musical opened in London's West End, with music by Andrew Lloyd Webber, lyrics by David Zippel, and book by Charlotte Jones, freely adapted from the novel. Directed by Trevor Nunn, it opened 15 September 2004 at the Palace Theatre.

The London production received mixed reviews from critics, with several reviewers noting that Lloyd Webber's score was weaker than in his previous works. Paul Taylor in The Independent said that "too many of the songs emit the generic pop-opera sound of Lloyd Webber-land." In the Evening Standard, Nicholas De Jongh wrote, "I came out humming with boredom: there is just one catchy song - the lovely I Believe My Heart." However, Quentin Letts argued that Lloyd Webber's music, "never before so classical and operatic, becomes hypnotic and slowly unveils its melodies. You have to work for it but it's worth it." De Jongh criticised Jones' book, noting "If only Lloyd Webber had realised Charlotte Jones's free adaptation of Collins's original was preposterous." In his three-star review for The Guardian, Michael Billington praised David Zippel's "deft and neat" lyrics but, like De Jongh, took issue with Jones' book. He said, "I don't object to Jones excising minor characters or altering the story's structure: that inevitably happens when you turn a novel into a musical. What I find objectionable is that, in trying to give the story a modern spin and show all Victorian women as social victims, she actually deprives Marian of much of her odd, independent quirkiness that makes her one of the most original characters in fiction." Some critics noted the show's set design, which employed the innovative use of projections rather than traditional scenery. Allen Bird wrote: "William Dudley’s set design (or should I say video design) is magnificent; the opening projection of a foggy station on which the woman in white first makes her ghostly appearance is spine tingling."

At the end of 2004 Michael Crawford was taken ill, as a result of oversweating in the fat suit he wore to play the grossly obese character Count Fosco (originally reported as having the flu). From late December until early February 2005, Steve Varnom, the understudy, played the role. Michael Ball then took over on 21 February 2005 until early May. Ball received praise for his portrayal because he had reinvented the role. Nick Curtis, in his review for The Evening Standard, wrote: "If Ball's Fosco lacks the extravagant comic flair of Crawford's original, there is a commensurate gain in menace. Arguably, this is no bad thing for a Victorian melodrama. Where Crawford was delightfully clownish, Ball's Fosco is altogether more sleek and dangerous. His wooing of the show's feisty heroine Marion...has a nasty edge to it."

On 9 July 2005, the final original London Cast (except with Fosco being played by Anthony Andrews) appeared on stage. It was also the final performance of the "first" version. The "second" version opened on 11 July 2005, with an almost completely new cast including Ruthie Henshall (Marian), Alexandra Silber (Laura), Damian Humbley (Hartwright), and Michael Cormick (Glyde). Many original ensemble members remained, along with Andrews and Edward Petherbridge, who played Mr. Fairlie.

Simon Callow made his musical theatre debut as Count Fosco in August 2005. According to Really Useful, "Trevor Nunn and Andrew Lloyd Webber initiated creative changes during rehearsals for the new West End cast. There will be a press night on Monday 19th September."

The production was received with more enthusiasm though feelings were still mixed. The show reportedly received some cutting, but still took roughly as long because of an extended ending which almost filled in the time saved earlier. Ian Shuttleworth noted that "I can identify no specific instances of revision... but in general Trevor Nunn's production now feels tighter and more narratively driven...Ruthie Henshall as Marian is appealing as ever,...she is almost equalled by Alexandra Silber, who makes a magnificent debut as her sister Laura....[Simon Callow] eschews the wild prosthetic jowls of his predecessors in the role, ...using only a slightly exaggerated nose and a little padding, and makes up in immense brio what he lacks (sometimes sorely) in tunefulness."

On 20 January 2006, it was officially announced by producer Sonia Friedman and Really Useful that the show would close in London on 25 February 2006 after a run of 19 months.

=== Broadway ===
The Broadway production was shortened far more than the Version 2.0. Verses were cut from "Perspective" and "The Seduction," along with "If Not for Me, For Her" (also cut in Version 2.0). The scenery was improved further. William Dudley's curved walls were no longer perfectly round, but oval shaped (it made the images feel more encompassing). The walls also had their doors fixed. The London production (through its end in 2006) had the doors aligned with the walls on only one side, so whenever they were spun around to the audience, there was roughly four inches of excess space between the wall and the door within. The Broadway production solved this problem by attaching the doors to tracks inside the 6-inch-thick (150 mm) walls so that they would move to the other side whenever the walls were spun.

The Broadway production opened on 17 November 2005 at the Marquis Theatre to mixed critical reaction. In his The New York Times review, Ben Brantley wrote: "It's not a terrible show, but it's an awfully pallid one." Howard Kissel (New York Daily News) wrote: "The use of projections, stunningly designed by William Dudley, enables the scenes to fly by. Sometimes the images seem blurred and the pace is dizzying. But even in the quiet scenes, there is a sense of tension and momentum. Lloyd Webber's score is entirely focused on keeping the story moving. In the early scenes, in which there are a few duets and trios, there is a shimmering delicacy to the music... What gives Woman its dramatic power is Maria Friedman's shattering performance as the sister of the unlucky bride... " David Rooney, reviewing for Variety, wrote: "the melodrama feels sadly hollow... Lloyd Webber's music, while it tempers the syrupy romanticism of his melodies by weaving more complex, discordant textures that echo the story's troubled moods, fires off almost its entire arsenal in the first act and then remains stuck in repetitive overdrive."

This followed much publicity after the show's star, Maria Friedman, who had created the role of Marian Halcombe in the original London production, was diagnosed with breast cancer during previews. She underwent treatment and returned for the Broadway premiere. Lisa Brescia performed the lead role during Friedman's several absences on Broadway. Judy Kuhn was announced to fill in for Friedman starting on 12 February 2006, but, since the show closed on 19 February, those plans changed and Friedman stayed until the closing.

The Broadway production closed earlier than the London production on 19 February 2006, having played 109 regular performances and 20 previews. The producers cited Friedman's frequent absences (as well as the negative reviews) as difficult obstacles to overcome.

Really Useful group noted that a tour was planned to open in Milton Keynes in January, 2007, but the tour failed to materialise.

=== 2017 London revival ===
On 20 November 2017 a new production, with a revised score, opened at the Charing Cross Theatre in London. It was directed by Thom Southerland, and starred Anna O'Byrne as Laura, Chris Peluso as Sir Percival Glyde, Carolyn Maitland as Marian, Ashley Stillburn as Walter Hartright, Greg Castiglioni as Fosco, and Sophie Reeves as Anne. It closed on 10 February 2018.

The production received more positive reviews from critics than during its original West End run. In her three-star review for The Guardian, Lyn Gardner praised the performances, describing them as "eye-catching and vocally impressive", adding that "They are the reason to see this show and serve as a reminder of the UK’s increasingly deep pool of talented musical theatre actors." Tim Bano also gave the show three stars, saying "as enjoyable as Southerland’s production is, it feels like this cast and creative team are wasted on this mediocre material." However Mark Valencia, writing for What's On Stage, gave the show four stars and said: "The Woman in White was always an intimate musical trapped in an overblown production by Trevor Nunn. Now, shorn of its excess and trimmed of its narrative flab, it can be seen for what it is: an effective show with the wherewithal to become a popular classic."

== Musical numbers ==
ACT I

- "Prologue" – Hartright, Signalman, Anne and Servant
- "I Hope You Like It Here" – Marian, Mr. Fairlie, Hartright and Laura
- "Perspective" – Marian, Laura and Hartright
- "Trying Not to Notice" – Hartright, Marian and Laura
- "I Believe My Heart" – Hartright and Laura
- "Lammastide" – Villagers, Men, Women and Girl
- "You See I Am No Ghost" – Anne and Hartright
- "Marian Tells of the Engagement" – Marian and Hartright
- "Sir Percival Glyde Arrives" – Servant, Glyde, Mr. Fairlie, Marian and Laura
- "Fosco's Arrival" – Fosco and Marian
- "A Gift for Living Well" – Fosco, Glyde, Laura, Marian, Mr. Fairlie and Hartright
- "I Believe My Heart" (Reprise) – Laura and Hartright
- "The Holly and the Ivy" – Congregation and Girl
- "Anne Catherick Decides to Help Laura" – Anne
- "Marian Hears the Truth from Laura" – Marian and Laura
- "All for Laura" – Marian and Anne
- "The Document" – Glyde, Laura, Marian and Fosco
- "Act I Finale" – Marian, Laura, Anne, Glyde, Men and Fosco

ACT II

- "If I Could Only Dream This World Away" – Laura and Marian
- "Marian On the Ledge" – Glyde and Fosco
- "Marian's Bedroom" – Fosco and Marian
- "The Nightmare" – Fosco, Laura, Anne, Glyde, Hartright, Chorus and Marian
- "Fosco Tells of Laura's Death" / "The Funeral" / "London" – Fosco, Marian, Priest, Glyde and Mr. Fairlie
- "Evermore Without You" – Hartright
- "Lost Souls" – Chorus, Maria and Connartist
- "Marian Sees the Sketch" – Marian and Pawnbroker
- "Marian Finds Hartright" – Marian and Hartright
- "If Not For Me For Her" – Marian and Hartright (Cut from show in July 2005)
- "Percival Gambles the Fruits of His Success" – Chorus, Glyde and Fosco
- "You Can Get Away with Anything" – Fosco
- "The Seduction" – Fosco and Marian
- "A Gift for Living Well" (Reprise) – Fosco
- "I Can Get Away with Anything" – Fosco
- "The Perfect Team" – Marian and Hartright
- "The Asylum" – Marian, Hartright and Laura
- "Back to Limmeridge" – Glyde, Mr. Fairlie, Hartright, Marian and Laura
- "Finale" – Glyde, Signalman, Laura, Hartright, Marian and Villagers
- "I Believe My Heart" (Reprise 2) – Hartright and Laura
- "Trying Not to Notice" (Reprise) – Marian

== Plot ==
On a midnight train trip on the way to Limmeridge House as a drawing teacher, Walter Hartright sees a strange woman dressed entirely in white, apparently fleeing from someone and desperate to share a terrible secret with him. The signalman is scared because although he saw no-one, it was predicted a year earlier that in a 'year to this day', someone would be found dead on the railway track ("Prologue").

Walter meets his new students: Marian Halcombe and her pretty half-sister Laura Fairlie, who is heir to the estate which includes Limmeridge House ("I Hope You Like It Here"). He tells them about his encounter, and they resolve to solve the mystery ("Perspective").

A love triangle develops as Walter and Laura quickly fall in love but Marian also falls for Walter and those feelings are not reciprocated ("I’m Trying Not To Notice It"/"I Believe My Heart"). The peasants on the Limmeridge Estate sing and dance to celebrate the harvest. A girl is excluded from the festival because her mother believes her to be 'telling tales'. She tells Hartright of a ghost of a woman in all white ("Lammastide"). Hartright goes to the graveyard where the child saw the 'ghost' and meets Anne Catherick, who tells him her name and the name of the man who she is scared of: "Sir Percival Glyde". Marian tells Walter that Laura is engaged to a man of 'titled property': Sir Percival Glyde. Later Glyde arrives at Limmeridge, pretending to be a long-standing friend to Marian. He suggests that they move the wedding up from spring to Christmas and Laura eventually agrees.

Count Fosco, Glyde's friend and best man for the wedding, arrives and becomes attracted to Marian ("You See I Am No Ghost").

When questioned by Walter about Anne Catherick, Glyde tells him that she is mad. He mentions that he tried to help her, and she thinks that he is her enemy. Laura is reluctant to marry Glyde, but Marian encourages her to honor her father's dying wish. Walter receives all this news angrily and leaves for London, but not before Laura returns a picture he drew of her ("Gift For Living Well"). Laura and Glyde are married. Anne Catherick decides to travel to Laura's side to help her, because she insists that Glyde 'knows no mercy'.

Marian moves into Blackwater House, Glyde's estate. Laura becomes angry and distrustful of Marian because her advice led her to marry a man whom she discovers to be a physically abusive husband; he only wants her for her money, to pay off his debt ("The Holy and the Ivy"). Marian is determined to free Laura from this ill-fated marriage ("All For Laura").

The next day, Glyde presents Laura with a document to sign, but he will not tell her its contents. Laura is immediately suspicious, and refuses to sign something she knows nothing about. Glyde is furious, but cannot force her to sign the document ("The Document"). The girls go for a walk to calm down, and meet Anne Catherick. They witness Anne being taken back to the Asylum. They are then completely convinced that Glyde and his friend Fosco are villains. Laura and Anne realize how similar they are to each other ("Act 1 Finale").

Marian eavesdrops on Sir Percival and Count Fosco, and overhears their evil plans to steal the Limmeridge Estate. She also overhears their plans for Anne Catherick, but Count Fosco figures out that he is being watched before he reveals anything important about the madwoman. He leaves the library to put Marian to bed ("If I Could Only Dream This World Away"). Marian, having gone to bed, starts to dream a montage of events that have occurred recently, mixed in with some noises. The noises, though not apparent to Marian, are actually Laura arguing and screaming ("The Nightmare").

Marian shortly is woken up by Count Fosco, who tells her that Laura was walking in her sleep and fell out the window. Marian is quite shaken by the tragic news. Fosco, avoiding drama, heads off to his house in London. However, being infatuated with Marian, he gives her his address in case she needs anything. At the village funeral Glyde suggests to Mr Fairlie that they get to the papers that need to be attended to. In a show of grief Glyde tries to shake Marian's hand but she ignores him, but vowing revenge for her sister she heads to find Walter.

In London, Walter has run out of money and gives his last coin to a beggar ("Fosco Tells of Laura’s Death"/"The Funeral"/"London"). Having heard the news through the grapevine of Laura's death, Walter expresses his grief at losing the love of his life ("Evermore Without You"). Coincidentally, Glyde, who is frustrated with paperwork, also shares Walter's feelings for Laura. Marian goes to London in search of Walter ("Lost Souls").

When Marian finds Walter, he joins her in her quest to learn the secret of Anne Catherick and avenge Laura's death. Marian believes that Anne's location is in a document that she witnessed Count Fosco sign the night she eavesdropped. Meanwhile, Glyde is happily betting the money that he has not yet received, which infuriates Fosco and leads to a split in their friendship. Marian and Walter are ready to leave for their visit to Count Fosco's. Marian is dressed specifically with the intent to use her feminine wiles against Fosco, which makes Walter suddenly realize his true feelings for her ("If Not For Me For Her"). Fosco, pleased with his part in the manipulation of everyone, gloats to himself and his pet mice ("You Can Get Away With Anything").

Marian and Walter go to Fosco's home to retrieve the document, where he attempts to seduce Marian, not realizing that she is purposefully playing along. She sends him to the bathroom to shave as a diversion, whilst she searches for the document. She finds it, and discovers the location of Anne's asylum. When Fosco returns from the bathroom he discovers that Marian is visiting for another purpose. A rejected Fosco admits if Marian were really interested in him, he would have proposed marriage ("The Seduction").

Marian and Walter go to the asylum to get the secret from Anne Catherick. However, when they arrive at Anne's cell, they find not Anne but Laura. Laura explains that Glyde put Laura in Anne's place at the asylum, killed Anne, then buried her in Laura's grave. In desperation the threesome head to Limmeridge House to try to learn the secret from Mr. Fairlie, who knows more about Anne Catherick than he says he does ("The Asylum").

Meanwhile, Sir Percival Glyde has convinced Mr. Fairlie to give the Limmeridge Estate to him because he was married to Laura. Fairlie signs the document and Glyde goes off to catch a train.

Marian, Laura and Walter arrive at Limmeridge House after Glyde has left for the train. Mr. Fairlie reveals that Anne Catherick is in fact Laura's half-sister, and they look identical. Marian tells him of the conspiracy, but Fairlie sadly tells her that he already signed the document. The three run to the train to stop Glyde from getting away ("Back to Limmeridge").

While still in Anne's white clothing, Laura pretends to be Anne and attempts to haunt Glyde if he does not tell the truth about the secret. "I had to drown your bastard child!" he exclaims. Laura reads between the lines and figures out the secret: Glyde had raped Anne, and drowned their child at Blackwater Lake. He tries to kill Laura to silence her but is run over by a train. The signalman's prediction comes true, but it is Glyde, not Walter, who lies dead on the tracks. Walter and Laura are happily married, Walter inherits Limmeridge House, and Marian is left heartbroken ("Finale").

== Casting ==
The principal original casts of the major productions of The Woman in White.

Character	Sydmonton Workshop	Original London Cast	Original Broadway Cast
Marian Halcombe	Laura Michelle Kelly	Maria Friedman	Maria Friedman
Count Fosco	Roger Allam	Michael Crawford	Michael Ball
Anne Catherick	Jaime Farr	Angela Christian	Angela Christian
Walter Hartright	Kevin McKidd	Martin Crewes	Adam Brazier
Laura Fairlie	Anne Hathaway	Jill Paice	Jill Paice
Sir Percival Glyde	Kevin Colson	Oliver Darley	Ron Bohmer
Mr Fairlie		Edward Petherbridge	Walter Charles
Corn Dolly Girl		Sophie Catherside; Leah Verity White; Sydney Rae White	Justis Bolding

Marian Halcombe was performed by standby Lisa Brescia on Broadway during Maria Friedman's absence.

Notable West End Replacements

- Marian Halcombe – Ruthie Henshall
- Anne Catherick - Elinor Collett
- Count Fosco – Michael Ball, Anthony Andrews, Simon Callow, David Burt

== Awards and nominations ==
Olivier Award (2005)

- Best New Musical (Nominated)
- Best Actress in a Musical - Maria Friedman (Nominated)
- Best Performance in a Supporting Role in a Musical - Michael Crawford (Nominated)
- Best Set Design - William Dudley (Nominated)
- Best Sound Design (Win)

Whats On Stage Awards (2005)

- Best Actress in a Musical - Maria Friedman (Win)
- Best Actor in a Musical - Martin Crewes (Nominated - Second place)
- Best Supporting Actress in a Musical - Angela Christian (Win)
- Best Supporting Actor in a Musical - Michael Crawford (Win)
- Best New Musical (Nominated - Second place)
- Best Director - London Calling - Trevor Nunn (Win)
- Best Set Designer - William Dudley (Win)
- Planet Hollywood Theatrical Event of the Year (Nominated)

Tony Award

- Best Original Score (Nominated)

Outer Critics Circle Award

- Outstanding New Broadway Musical (Nominated)
- Outstanding Costume Design - William Dudley (Nominated)
- Outstanding Featured Actor in a Musical - Michael Ball (Nominated)
- Outstanding Lighting Design - Paul Pyant (Nominated)
- Outstanding Set Design - William Dudley (Nominated)

Theatre World Award

- Maria Friedman—Winner

== In popular culture ==
- In a 2011 episode ("Broadway Bro Down") of the American Television show South Park, "The Woman in White" was the name given by Andrew Lloyd Webber to Randy Marsh's musical (originally titled "Splooge Drenched Blowjob Queen") in which blowjobs were the sole "subtext" of the work-in-progress play.
- The show was a plot point in Woody Allen's 2005 film Match Point.
