= Richard Woolfe =

British television producer (born 1962)

Joseph Richard Woolfe (born 14 August 1962) is a senior British broadcast figure. Until recently, Woolfe was the Creative Director of Prime Focus Productions, the UK arm of Prime Focus Group, a role created for him to help spearhead the post-production house's push into TV production, with a focus on high-end drama and entertainment formats. Woolfe was formerly channel controller of Sky1 and Channel 5.

According to The Guardian, "there is no one more noisy in UK TV management than Woolfe".

== Early life ==
He originates from East Sussex. He gained a BEd degree from Manchester Polytechnic.

== Career ==
A self publicist, Woolfe's first major roles in the television industry were as Head of Entertainment at Planet 24, Editor of Entertainment Programmes at Granada Television and Entertainment and Features Producer at the BBC and at Real Television. He also served as Controller of LivingTV, Ftn and Bravo.

=== BSkyB ===
Woolfe took up the role of Head of Sky1, Sky2 and Sky3 at BSkyB in January 2006.

=== Five ===
He moved to Channel 5 to become Channel Controller in April 2009. He worked as Creative Director of Prime Focus Productions for almost a year but now is a television consultant at his own company Richard Woolfe TV.

=== Credits and awards ===
Whilst at LivingTV, Woolfe was named "Industry player of the year" at the MediaGuardian Edinburgh International TV festival. Wrongly cited as the person who commissioned Most Haunted, it was actually Arch Dyson two weeks before Woolfe took the job. Whilst at LivingTV Woolfe oversaw some failures too, Cilla with high production values and a large ad campaign the audience stayed away.

As Director of Programmes at Sky1, 2 & 3, Woolfe overhauled the entire channel brand, and oversaw the acquisition and development of award-winning US dramas, including Lost and Prison Break, and home-grown entertainment and drama formats including Ross Kemp on Gangs. The production of Terry Pratchett's Hogfather "marked a new era of domestically produced drama for Sky, entertaining audiences of over 2.8 million and securing Sky1 its first ever BAFTA. In 2008, Sky1 was named Broadcast's Best Digital Entertainment Channel under Woolfe's leadership. Woolfe acquired a further BAFTA for Ross Kemp on Gangs. Also at Sky, Woolfe resurrected Gladiators (UK TV series), which secured a total audience of over 1.6m for its launch show.

Woolfe's producer credits include: That's Life!, The National Lottery Live, the first £1m Survivor final, Queer Eye for the Straight Guy UK, Extreme Makeover UK, Gladiators (executive producer), Don't Forget The Lyrics! (co-executive producer) and the ill-conceived Don't Stop Believing (executive producer). Richard did not survive at Channel 5 when Richard Desmond took over the channel. Don't Stop Believing became a media headline as Desmond didn't want to pay the full cost because of its failure to gain good audience figure.

== Personal life ==
He married in 1988 and has a son and daughter.

Media offices
Preceded by	Controller of Five; April 2009 – 2010	Succeeded by
Preceded by	Controller of Sky 1, 2 & 3 January 2006 – April 2009	Succeeded by
Preceded by	Director of Television of Living TV; 2001–2006	Succeeded by
