= University of Sheffield School of Information, Journalism and Communication =

University of Sheffield School of Journalism, Media and Communication
- Established: 1963
- Location: Sheffield, England; 53.38114937342727°N 1.4795279191451092°W
- Language: English
- Website: https://www.sheffield.ac.uk/ijc

The school that is now the School of Information, Journalism and Communications of the University of Sheffield, in Sheffield, South Yorkshire, England, was founded in 1963 as the University's Postgraduate School of Librarianship and became in 2010 the first UK iSchool. It became the School of Information, Journalism and Communication after merging with the School of Journalism, Media and Communication in 2025, and maintains its membership of the iSchools organisation. Previous names for the University of Sheffield iSchool were the Postgraduate School of Librarianship and Information Science (PGSLIS, 1967–81) and Department of Information Studies (1981-2011). Professor Briony Birdi, Head of School of the Information School, became the Head of the School of Information, Journalism and Communication upon the merger, and continues to lead the School as of 2026.

The department opened in 1964 as a library school, becoming only the second university-based department in the UK. Since then, like many information science departments it has grown to encompass teaching and research in cheminformatics, educational informatics, health informatics, information retrieval, information systems, knowledge and information management, as well as libraries and information society. Such is the status of the school, that it has twice been honoured with a special issue of the Journal of Information Science devoted entirely to the department, its staff and its research outputs.

== Research achievements ==
The School is Number One in the World for Library and Information Studies in the QS World University Rankings 2021. The school has ranked highest or joint highest in its subject rating in every Research Assessment Exercise since the running of the first exercise in 1986. In this UK-government sponsored assessment of research outputs, no other department in its subject field (or its University) achieved this consistency; few departments of any subject area in UK universities managed such a high level of continuous research output (see the following links to the 1992, 1996, 2001 RAE results). In 2008, rankings of departments was left to news organizations; the Times Higher Education placed Sheffield at No. 1 again.

In 2008, an analysis of citations showed four of the ten most cited UK information studies academics were working in the Sheffield department. It is also the first UK-based (and 2nd European) department to become an iSchool.

== Notable staff, past and present ==
- Micheline Beaulieu - Chair of the Computing and Informatics Panel of the European Research Council (2008-2011)
- Sheila Corrall - first President of Chartered Institute of Library and Information Professionals (CILIP), 2002-3:.
- Michael Lynch, chemoinformatics specialist
- Wilfred Saunders, Founding Director of the Postgraduate School of Librarianship, Sheffield
- Bob Usherwood - President of the Library Association, 1998; fellow of the Royal Society of Arts.
- Steve Whittaker - inducted into the SIGCHI academy in 2008.
- Paul Clough - Head of Information Retrieval Research Group
- Peter Willett - leading researcher in cheminformatics.
- Tom Wilson - recipient of the 2009 ASIS&T SIG USE award for "outstanding contributions to information behavior" and Association for Information Science and Technology (ASIS&T) Award of Merit, 2017.

== Notable alumni ==
- Michael Buckland - Emeritus Professor at the University of California—Berkeley School of Information and Co-Director of the Electronic Cultural Atlas Initiative
- John McTernan - Director of Political Operations at 10 Downing Street under Tony Blair.
- Alasdair Paterson - poet, winner of the 1975 Eric Gregory Award for poetry.
- Hatoon Kadi - Saudi Arabian comedian and activist who hosts the Noon Al Niswa comedy show on YouTube.
