= Legacy (2013 film) =

- Genre: Drama
- Based on: Legacy by Alan Judd
- Written by: Paula Milne
- Directed by: Pete Travis
- Starring: Charlie Cox; Romola Garai; Simon Russell Beale; Geraldine James; Christian McKay; Olivia Grant; Richard McCabe; Andrew Scott; Tessa Peake-Jones; Barrie Martin; Alec Utgoff; Erick Hayden
- Theme music composer: Ruth Barrett
- Country of origin: United Kingdom
- Original language: English

Production
- Producer: Rob Bullock
- Editor: Stuart Gazzard
- Running time: 90 minutes
- Production company: Slim Film + Television

Original release
- Network: BBC Two
- Release: 28 November 2013

Legacy is a British thriller television film that broadcast on BBC Two on 28 November 2013. It is an adaptation of Alan Judd's 2001 spy novel of the same name.

== Plot ==
Charles Thoroughgood (Charlie Cox), a young spy, discovers the truth about his father's past. After leaving the army, he starts training at the Secret Intelligence Service when Viktor Koslov (Andrew Scott), a Soviet diplomat, gets him on a case. Charles' bosses want to exploit Viktor. When Charles makes contact with him, Viktor tells him information that he does not want to believe. Charles is also in a relationship with the wife of another agent.

== Cast ==
- Charlie Cox as Charles Thoroughood, a young spy
- Romola Garai as Anna March
- Simon Russell Beale as Hookey
- Geraldine James as Martha
- Christian McKay as Hugo March
- Olivia Grant as Eva Pym
- Richard McCabe as Gerry
- Andrew Scott as Viktor Koslov, a Soviet diplomat
- Tessa Peake-Jones as Joyce Thoroughgood
- Robert Ashby as Annikov
- Charlotte Randle as Emily
- Barrie Martin as Protester
- Alec Utgoff as Rhykov
- Erick Hayden as CIA agent

== Production ==
The screenplay was written by Paula Milne and directed by Pete Travis. Paula Milne said:

Legacy falls well within the genre of the British spy thriller but has an extraordinary personal twist. For what is espionage if not betrayal at the most fundamental level of human interactions? When that occurs within a family... It's dynamite!

The television film was commissioned by Ben Stephenson, controller of drama commissioning for the BBC, and Janice Hadlow, controller of BBC Two. The executive producers are Crawford Collins, Paula Milne and Alan Judd for Slim Film + Television and Lucy Richer for the BBC. Rob Bullock is the producer and Rebecca Ferguson the script executive. The television film was commissioned as part of BBC Two's Cold War season.

The production filmed in Deal, Kent, which doubled as a Suffolk village towards the end of the film where Charles follows Viktor. Deal Pier was also used for the scenes where Charles and Anna walk down the pier watching Viktor with his wife, who are being closely followed by the Russian KGB as well as the night scene where Charles and Viktor meet under the pier and discuss the KGB's plans to attack the Power Station.

== Reception ==
=== Ratings ===
Overnight figures showed that Legacy was watched by 7.3% of the viewing audience, with 1.59 million viewers. Official figures raised the number of viewers to 1.85 million.

=== Critical reception ===
The Independent journalist Gerard Gilbert said: "I guess I'm just not sure that I entirely saw the point of Legacy beyond the fact that the BBC had decided to have a season of programmes about the Cold War." Keith Watson of Metro said that "despite great performances, Legacy got caught up in cloak-and-dagger cliché". The Daily Telegraph's Gerard O'Donovan gave it three out of five stars and said he wished "the characters had been better drawn." Grace Dent of The Independent found the film boring and said "everyone in this Cold War thriller was brilliant, but I still fell asleep".
