= The Exception =

2016 film by David Leveaux

- Theatrical release poster
- Directed by: David Leveaux
- Written by: Simon Burke
- Based on: The Kaiser's Last Kiss by Alan Judd
- Produced by: Lou Pitt; Judy Tossell
- Starring: Lily James; Jai Courtney; Janet McTeer; Christopher Plummer; Ben Daniels; Eddie Marsan; Anton Lesser; Mark Dexter; Martin Savage
- Cinematography: Roman Osin
- Edited by: Nicolas Gaster
- Music by: Ilan Eshkeri
- Production companies: Egoli Tossell Film; Ostar Productions; Alton Road Productions; Silver Reel; Lotus Entertainment; Umedia; Film House Germany; Screen Flanders
- Distributed by: A24 DirecTV (United States); Signature Entertainment (United Kingdom)
- Release dates: 12 September 2016 (TIFF); 2 June 2017 (United States); 2 October 2017 (United Kingdom)
- Running time: 107 minutes
- Countries: United Kingdom; United States
- Language: English
- Box office: $872,805

The Exception is a 2016 romantic war film directed by David Leveaux (in his directorial debut) and written by Simon Burke, based on Alan Judd's 2003 novel The Kaiser's Last Kiss. The film stars Jai Courtney, Lily James, Janet McTeer, and Christopher Plummer. The plot is a fictionalized account of the life of exiled Kaiser Wilhelm II (Plummer). When a Wehrmacht officer (Courtney) is ordered to determine whether or not a British spy has infiltrated the Kaiser's residence with a view to assassinating the deposed monarch, he falls in love with one of the Kaiser's maids (James) during his investigation. The film is set in the occupied Netherlands during World War II.

In 2014, Egoli Tossell Film announced that development on a film adaptation of Judd's novel had begun. Principal photography in Belgium lasted six weeks in 2015. The film held its world premiere at the 2016 Toronto International Film Festival in the Special Presentations section. The film received a limited theatrical release and a video-on-demand release on 2 June 2017, through A24 and DirecTV Cinema in the United States. The film was released on 2 October 2017 in the United Kingdom through Signature Entertainment.

== Plot ==
During World War II, Wehrmacht Captain Brandt takes command of the bodyguard of deposed German Emperor Wilhelm II at Huis Doorn, near Utrecht, the Netherlands. The Germans are concerned that an Allied spy may be planning to assassinate him. While Wilhelm has no power, the SS are aware that he still has great symbolic importance to the German people.

The Kaiser's adjutant, Colonel von Ilsemann, gives Brandt strict orders not to interfere with the female servants, but Brandt is quickly drawn into impulsive sex with one maid, Mieke de Jong. This develops into a passionate affair. She reveals to Brandt that she is Jewish, and after a pause, he replies, "I'm not," telling her not to share her secret with anyone else.

Gestapo Inspector Dietrich informs Brandt that the British Secret Service has an agent with a radio hidden in a nearby village, and orders Brandt to identify a second agent known to be inside the former Kaiser's household.

Before a visit from Reichsführer-SS Heinrich Himmler, Brandt notices a smell of gun oil from Mieke's room. He follows Mieke when she visits the village pastor and hears her tell him that she is prepared to assassinate Himmler as revenge for the SS having murdered her father and husband. The pastor responds that assassinating Himmler is not their mission.

The SS pinpoints the pastor’s radio transmissions. They arrest and savagely torture him, demanding the name of the other spy. Shortly afterward, Wilhelm's ambitious wife, Hermine, tells him of Brandt and Mieke's affair. She expects Wilhelm to dismiss Mieke and have Brandt court-martialed, but the former Kaiser responds that even though he no longer rules Germany, he will rule his own house. He tells the lovers that he fathered illegitimate children before and after marrying his first wife, Empress Augusta Victoria. Saying he will not be a hypocrite, the Kaiser tells them to be more discreet.

During a house search before Himmler's arrival, Brandt himself searches Mieke's room to protect her cover. Brandt learns that the tortured pastor will soon reveal Mieke's identity, and he urges her to flee. She refuses.

Himmler extends an invitation from Adolf Hitler to Wilhelm to return to his former throne in Berlin. He then tells Brandt and Dietrich that the invitation is a bluff, intended to draw out and execute anti-Nazi monarchists in the German resistance. Hermine is overjoyed at the thought of becoming Empress of Germany. Still, Wilhelm, troubled by Himmler's boasts about the euthanasia of disabled children, remains unsure even when von Ilsemann suggests that Wilhelm can become "a restraining influence."

When Brandt asks von Ilsemann whether an officer can serve something other than his country, the Colonel replies, "First you must decide what is your country and if it even still exists." Brandt tells von Ilsemann of Himmler's plans for the Kaiser's supporters.

Mieke delivers a message from Winston Churchill to Wilhelm, offering the Kaiser political asylum and the throne of a defeated Germany after the war. Wilhelm refuses, having decided that he is reconciled to the loss of his throne.

As the Gestapo closes in on Mieke, Brandt devises an escape plan. Wilhelm, Mieke, and Brandt escape in a van as the Kaiser pretends to have a heart attack. In the process, Mieke almost takes a suicide pill. Brandt saves her life and avoids capture by killing Dietrich. Mieke asks Brandt to flee with her, fearing he will be executed for the murders. Brandt insists that he has a duty to Germany and has a good alibi. As Mieke departs, Brandt asks Mieke to marry him. Before fleeing, she accepts and tells him to find her after the war is over.

Some time later, Brandt is working in Berlin. A package that contains a book of Nietzsche's writings that Mieke had once shown him is delivered. Inside is written a London address. In London, Mieke is seated on a park bench when she is informed that Churchill is ready to see her. Rising, Mieke puts her hand on her stomach; she is pregnant with Brandt's child. In Doorn, Colonel von Ilsemann informs Wilhelm that Brandt has called from Berlin with wonderful news. Realising this means Mieke has escaped to Britain, Wilhelm is overjoyed.

== Cast ==
- Lily James as Mieke de Jong
- Jai Courtney as Captain Stefan Brandt
- Janet McTeer as Princess Hermine Reuss of Greiz
- Christopher Plummer as Kaiser Wilhelm II
- Eddie Marsan as Heinrich Himmler
- Ben Daniels as Colonel Sigurd von Ilsemann (in Dutch)(in German)
- Mark Dexter as Dietrich
- Kris Cuppens as Pastor Hendriks
- Anton Lesser as General Falkenberg
- Lucas Tavernier as SS-Colonel Meyer
- Verona Verbakel as Wehrmacht Secretary
- Alexis Van Stratum

== Production ==
=== Pre-production ===
Christopher Plummer's longtime manager and one of the film's lead producers, Lou Pitt, was recommended Alan Judd's novel The Kaiser's Last Kiss. Pitt said, "The first time I heard about the novel was from Chris, who liked the character and setting quite a lot, as did I after reading it ... this would have been around 2005 or 2006. At the time, the book was under option, but for good reason, we kept an eye on it.”

On 21 May 2014, Egoli Tossell Film and its parent company Film House Germany revealed that a film adaptation of Judd's novel was in development. At the 2015 Cannes Film Festival, Lotus Entertainment handled international sales for the film, previously titled The Kaiser's Last Kiss.

=== Casting ===
On 12 May 2015, it was announced that Lily James would play the character Mieke de Jong. On 7 July 2015, Jai Courtney was cast in the leading role as Captain Stefan Brandt. On 11 September 2015, Janet McTeer and Eddie Marsan joined the cast of The Kaiser's Last Kiss as Princess Hermine Reuss of Greiz and Heinrich Himmler, respectively.

=== Filming ===
On 11 September 2015, it was confirmed that principal photography was underway in Belgium. The film was shot in 33 days over six weeks, primarily at Leeuwergem Castle and in various locations in Belgium in 2015.

== Release ==
In October 2016, A24 and DirecTV Cinema acquired U.S distribution rights to the film. The film was released on 2 June 2017. The film was the closing-night selection of the 2017 Newport Beach Film Festival, where Lily James' performance was referred to as "a true breakout" by Festival co-founder and chief executive officer Gregg Schwenk. It was released on DVD and Blu-ray in the U.S. by Lionsgate on 8 August 2017.

== Reception ==
=== Critical response ===
Review aggregation website Rotten Tomatoes reports an approval rating of 75% based on 63 reviews, with an average rating of 6.2/10. The site's critical consensus reads, "The Exception (The Kaiser's Last Kiss) elegantly blends well-dressed period romance and war drama into a solidly crafted story further elevated by Christopher Plummer's excellent work and the efforts of a talented supporting cast." Metacritic gives the film a score of 60 out of 100, based on reviews from 15 critics, indicating "mixed or average reviews".
