= Joseph Mawle =

English actor (born 1974)

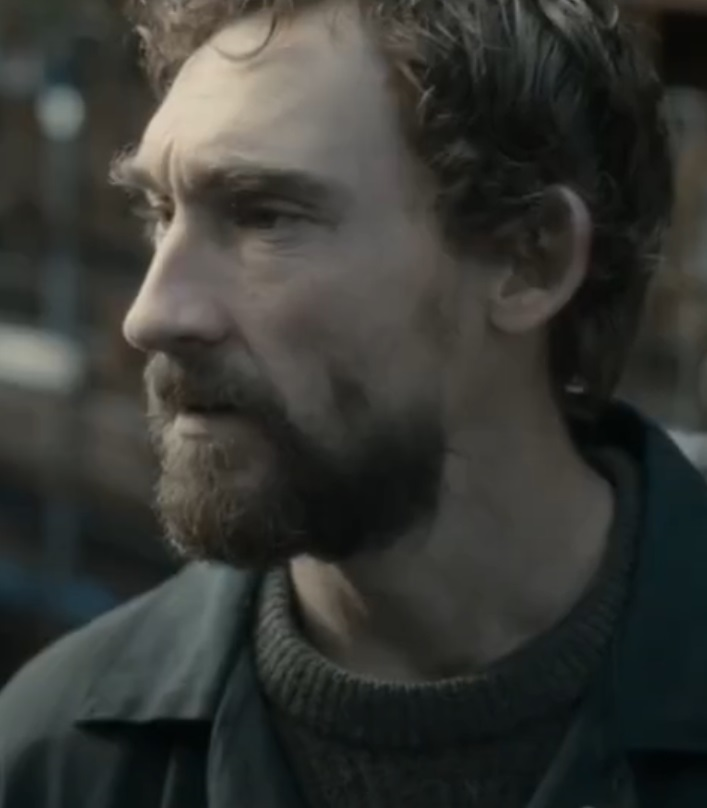
- Mawle in Shell 2012
- Born: 21 March 1974 (age 52); Oxford, Oxfordshire, England
- Education: Bristol Old Vic Theatre School
- Occupation: Actor
- Years active: 1998–present

Joseph Daniel Turner Mawle (born 21 March 1974) is an English actor. Mawle is best known for his roles as Jesus Christ in The Passion (2008), Benjen Stark in Game of Thrones (2011–2017), Pete in Shell (2012), Firebrace in Birdsong (2012), Thomas Lincoln in Abraham Lincoln: Vampire Hunter (2012), Detective Inspector Jedediah Shine in Ripper Street (2013–2016), Odysseus in Troy: Fall of a City (2018), and Adar in Season one of The Lord of the Rings: The Rings of Power (2022).

== Early life ==
Mawle was born in Oxford, England. He grew up in a Victorian manor house on a farm outside Shipston-on-Stour, Warwickshire. He is one of three children from a family with a history of nine generations of farming in Warwickshire. His mother was a teacher. His father Richard still farms the land.

He attended the Croft prep school on the outskirts of Stratford-upon-Avon, where he was diagnosed as severely dyslexic; consequently, he went from the ages of 13 to 16 to a boarding school for special needs. Mawle left the school at 16 to become an actor but contracted labyrinthitis, leaving him 70 per cent hearing-impaired in the upper register and with tinnitus. He persuaded the director of the local college at Stratford-upon-Avon to let him study for a BTEC in performing arts while doing an assortment of jobs such as fitness instructor and dishwasher.

He did some acting for the Box Clever Theatre Company and in his own production of Solo Hamlet. He won a scholarship to study at the Bristol Old Vic Theatre School.

== Career ==
Mawle graduated from Bristol Old Vic Theatre School in 2002, in the same year he appeared in TV adverts for Guinness. He left in 2002, with no agent, and worked as an assistant in a special education school. He landed his first major role in a 2003 production of Troilus and Cressida, playing Troilus for Shakespeare at the Tobacco factory, worked at the Nuffield Theatre, Southampton, in Hamlet, and in the Royal Exchange, Manchester's production of Antony and Cleopatra in 2005.

It was his performance in the television film Soundproof (2006), wherein a deaf actor was needed for the lead role, that made his biggest impact. Mawle was nominated for the RTS Breakthrough on Screen Award, and director Ed Coulthard won the BAFTA for best director in 2007.

Mawle has appeared in a number of subsequent British television productions, including Dunkirk, winner of the Huw Wheldon BAFTA Award for Factual Drama, and Adrian Shergold's Persuasion (2007) and Channel 4's gay drama Clapham Junction, in the role of Tim. Time Out said, "Mawle and Treadaway put in Bafta-winning efforts". In 2008, Mawle starred as Jesus in the BBC/HBO Films miniseries of The Passion, and as a guest star in the Foyle's War "Broken Souls" episode.

In 2008, he returned to the theatre in The Last Days of Judas Iscariot, at the Almeida Theatre, directed by Rupert Goold. He was listed for Outstanding Newcomer by the Evening Standard Theatre Awards and nominated for WhatsOnStage Theatre Choice Awards for Best Newcomer for his performance as Judas.

In 2009, he featured in multiple films: James Marsh's Nineteen Eighty (part of the Red Riding Trilogy), Philip Ridley's Heartless, and Dominic Savage's Freefall opposite Dominic Cooper and Aidan Gillen. On television that year, he starred in episode 4 of Jimmy McGovern's The Street.

In 2010, Mawle featured in artist David Austen's End of Love and in the short film Sometimes The Moon Is Velvet, which toured festivals. He also appeared in Agatha Christie's Murder on the Orient Express, the BBC drama Five Daughters, Dominic Savage's Dive, and Made in Dagenham starring Sally Hawkins. In 2011, he starred as Gerald Crich alongside Rosamund Pike as Crich's lover Gudrun Brangwen, in the BBC Four television adaptation of Women in Love.

Also in 2011, he was featured in The Horrible Crowes' music video for their debut single "Behold the Hurricane" and joined the HBO series Game of Thrones as Benjen Stark. Mawle appeared in the pilot episode and returned to the role in Season 6.

Mawle appeared in several projects in 2012, including the Working Title production of Sebastian Faulks' acclaimed novel Birdsong, the Bruce Willis film The Cold Light of Day, the Tim Burton-produced film Abraham Lincoln: Vampire Hunter, and the independent British film Shell.

2013 saw Mawle portray Stephen Beaumont in The Tunnel, and Detective Inspector Jedediah Shine on Ripper Street. Mawle had a lead role in the horror film The Hallow.

In October 2019, Mawle joined the cast of The Lord of the Rings: The Rings of Power on Amazon Prime Video: he was one of the first actors to join the project, and his involvement was later confirmed by Amazon themselves in early 2020. He played the central antagonist "Adar", a fallen Elf who became the first Uruk, father of the Orcs. In December 2022, it was revealed that the role of Adar would be recast for season two of the series, with Sam Hazeldine taking over the role and Mawle confirming on Twitter that he would not return.

== Filmography ==
=== Film ===
Year	Title	Role	Notes
2004	Dunkirk	Lt. Ian Cox	TV film
2006	Soundproof	Dean Whittingham	TV film
2006	The Secret Life of Mrs. Beeton	Fred	TV film
2007	Persuasion	Harry Harville	TV film
2007	Clapham Junction	Tim	TV film
2008	Lezione 21	Musician	Drama
2009	Red Riding 1980	Peter Sutcliffe / The Yorkshire Ripper	TV film
2009	Freefall	Jim	TV film
2009	After Tomorrow	James	Short
2009	Heartless	Papa B	Drama/Fantasy/Horror
2010	Sometimes the Moon is Velvet	Jack	Short
2010	Dive	Gary	TV film
2010	Deathless	Max Serloom	Short
2010	Made in Dagenham	Gordon	Comedy/Drama/History
2011	The Awakening	Edward Judd	Drama/Horror/Mystery
2012	The Cold Light of Day	Gorman	Action/Thriller
2012	Birdsong	Jake Firebrace	TV film
2012	Abraham Lincoln: Vampire Hunter	Thomas Lincoln	Action/Fantasy/Horror
2012	Shell	Pete	Drama
2013	Half of a Yellow Sun	Richard	Drama/Romance
2014	Twelve	Stuart	Short/Drama
2015	The Hallow	Adam Hitchens	Fantasy/Horror/Thriller
2015	In the Heart of the Sea	Benjamin Lawrence	Action/Adventure/Biography
2015	Kill your friends	James Trellick	Horror/Thriller/Drama
2016	Trial	Original Aaron	Short/Action/Sci-Fi
2018	Spoon Fed	Dan	Short
2019	Land's End	Michael	Short
2019	Mr Jones	George Orwell	Biography/Drama/Thriller

=== Television ===
Year	Title	Role	Notes
1998	Merlin	Village Man	Miniseries
2002	Sir Gadabout: The Worst Knight in the Land	Sir Tificate	
2006	Silent Witness	Adrian Burney	Episode: "Schism", two parts
2006	Dalziel and Pascoe	Charlie Barron	Episode: "The Cave Woman", two parts
2007	HolbyBlue	Simon Jenkins	Episode: "Simon Jenkins"
2008	Foyle's War	Fred Dawson	Episode: "Broken Souls"
2008	The Passion	Jesus	4 episodes, miniseries
2009	Free Agents		1 episode
2009	The Street	Keiran	1 episode
2009	Waking the Dead	Stefan Koscinski	Episode: "Substitute", two parts
2009	Merlin	Alvarr	Series 2, episode 11: "The Witch's Quickening"
2010	Five Daughters	Tom Stephens	3 episodes
2010	Agatha Christie's Poirot	Antonio Foscarelli	Episode: "Murder on the Orient Express"
2011	Women in Love	Gerald Crich	2-part episode
2011, 2016–2017	Game of Thrones	Benjen Stark	6 episodes
2013	The Tunnel	Stephen Beaumont	
2013, 2016	Ripper Street	Det. Insp. Jedediah Shine	
2015	Sense8	Nyx	
2018	Troy: Fall of a City	Odysseus	
2019	MotherFatherSon	Scott Ruskin	
2022	The Lord of the Rings: The Rings of Power	Adar	Season 1
2023	1923	Captain Shipley	Season 1, episodes 6 and 7
2024	Mary & George	Sir Walter Raleigh	Season 1, episode 5

=== Theatre ===
- 2003: Troilus and Cressida as Troilus (Shakespeare at the Tobacco Factory)
- 2004: Hamlet (the Nuffield Theatre, Southampton)
- 2005: Antony & Cleopatra (Royal Exchange, Manchester)
- 2008: The Last Days of Judas Iscariot (the Almeida Theatre)
