= Olivia Grant =

Olivia Grant may refer to:

- Olivia Grant (actress, born 1983), performed in the films Stardust and Fishtales, and BBC period drama Lark Rise to Candleford
- Olive Gray (formerly Olivia Grant; born 1994), actor who performed in The Story of Tracy Beaker and EastEnders; child of singers David and Carrie Grant
