= W. L. Saunders =

W. L. Saunders may refer to:

- Wilfred Leonard Saunders (1920-2007), British librarian and academic
- William Lawrence Saunders (1856-1931), American mining engineer
