= Sheila Corrall =

Sheila Corrall PG Dip.; MBA; MSc; PgCert.
- Born: 11 September 1950 (age 75)
- Education: University of Southampton
- Occupations: Professor of Library and Information Science
- Employer: University of Pittsburgh
- Organization(s): University of Sheffield; Chartered Institute of Library and Information Professionals; University of Southampton; University of Reading; Aston University; British Library

Sheila Mary Corrall is Professor of Library and Information Science at the University of Pittsburgh. Her research interests are in scholarly communication, collection development in the digital world, professional competence, and intellectual capital in library and information services.

== Education ==
Corrall completed a postgraduate diploma at the North London Polytechnic, now the University of North London. She holds an MBA from the Roffey Park Management Institute and a MSc in Information Systems from the University of Southampton.

== Career ==
Corrall worked at the British Library for ten years before moving into Higher Education libraries in 1991. She was Director of Library & Information Services at Aston University until 1995 when she moved to the University of Reading in the post of Librarian. In 2002 she was Director of Academic Support Services at the University of Southampton. In this year she also became a Fellow of the Chartered Institute of Library and Information Professionals (CILIP).

Corrall was appointed Professor of librarianship and information management at the University of Sheffield Information School in 2003. She was Head of Department from 2006, succeeding Peter Willett, until 2010. During her term, the department was invited to become the first UK member of the iSchools consortium, an international group of leading educational institutions committed to research in information.

Since 2012 Corrall has been Professor and Chair of the Library & Information Science Program at the University of Pittsburgh.

Corrall co-authored The new professional’s handbook: Your guide to information services management (1999), which was well-received for its coverage of a broad range of topics relevant to professional information workers. In 2003 she was awarded an International Information Industries Lifetime Achievement Award for her contribution to the information profession.

=== Chartered Institute of Library and Information Professionals presidency ===
Corrall was the first President of the Chartered Institute of Library and Information Professionals (CILIP), established in 2002 replacing the Institute of Information Scientists and the Library Association. During her presidency, Corrall championed information literacy. She was succeeded by Margaret Watson in 2003.
