= Snow in Paradise =

2014 film

- Film poster
- Directed by: Andrew Hulme
- Written by: Andrew Hulme; Martin Askew
- Produced by: Christine Alderson
- Starring: Frederick Schmidt; Martin Askew; David Spinx
- Cinematography: Mark Wolf
- Edited by: Barry Moen
- Music by: Kevin Pollard
- Production company: Ipso Facto Films
- Distributed by: Artificial Eye
- Release dates: 21 May 2014 (Cannes); 13 February 2015 (UK)
- Running time: 108 minutes
- Country: United Kingdom
- Language: English

Snow in Paradise is a 2014 British thriller film directed by Andrew Hulme and co-written by Hulme and Martin Askew, who also co-star in the film. It was screened in the Un Certain Regard section at the 2014 Cannes Film Festival. The film had its UK premier at the Curzon Soho as part of the London Film Festival.

== Plot ==
Petty criminal Dave lives in London, high on crime and drugs. After a heist gone wrong brings about his best friend's death, he turns to Islam for finding peace to his feelings for shame and remorse, but soon his past life comes back to haunt him.

== Cast ==
- Frederick Schmidt as Dave
- Martin Askew as Uncle Jimmy
- David Spinx as Micky
- Aymen Hamdouchi as Tariq
- Daniel Godward as Old Gangster
- Claire-Louise Cordwell as Theresa
- Amira Ghazalla as Mrs. Anwar
- Ashley Chin as Amjad
- Joel Beckett as Kenny
- Clive Brunt as Lee
- John Dagleish as Tony
- Adam Nagaitis as Gravesy
