= Women in Love (TV series) =

2011 British two-part television film

- DVD cover
- Genre: Drama
- Based on: The Rainbow and Women in Love by D. H. Lawrence
- Written by: William Ivory
- Directed by: Miranda Bowen
- Starring: Saskia Reeves; Rachael Stirling; Rosamund Pike; Rory Kinnear; Joseph Mawle
- Country of origin: United Kingdom
- Original language: English
- No. of episodes: 2

Production
- Producer: Mark Pybus
- Running time: 180 minutes
- Production company: Company Pictures

Original release
- Network: BBC Four
- Release: 24 March – 31 March 2011

Women in Love is a British two-part television film, a combined adaptation by William Ivory of two D. H. Lawrence novels, The Rainbow (1915) and Women in Love (1920). Directed by Miranda Bowen and produced by Mark Pybus, it features Saskia Reeves, Rachael Stirling, Rosamund Pike, Rory Kinnear, Joseph Mawle and Ben Daniels. It was first transmitted on BBC Four on 24 and 31 March 2011. It was made by Company Pictures and filmed in South Africa. Other cast members included Ben Daniels as Will Brangwen. Music by Chris Letcher.

== Cast ==
- Rory Kinnear as Rupert Birkin
- Rachael Stirling as Ursula Brangwen
- Joseph Mawle as Gerald Crich
- Olivia Grant as Hermione Roddice
- Rosamund Pike as Gudrun Brangwen
- Ben Daniels as Will Brangwen
- Saskia Reeves as Anna Brangwen
- Patrick Lyster as Mr. Crich
- James Alexander as Alexander Roddice
- Grant Swanby as Wolfgang Loerke

== Reception ==
In her review for The Daily Telegraph, Ceri Radford praised the performances and singled out Kinnear for praise. In conclusion, she said: "If you love DH Lawrence’s books, you probably loved this rich and well-acted adaptation. However, you may have found yourself cringing behind a cushion in places if, like me, you felt that the most tumescent thing in Lady Chatterley’s Lover was the prose." Sam Wollaston in The Guardian said that the two novels had been "artfully sewn together" and that it was "quite true to Lawrence in spirit, I think", despite saying he "never got on well" with the author.
