= Personal Affairs =

- Genre: Mystery Drama
- Written by: Gabbie Asher
- Directed by: Jenny Ash (2 episodes); James Henry (2 episodes); Ashley Way (2 episodes)
- Starring: Laura Aikman; Olivia Grant; Maimie McCoy; Ruth Negga; Annabel Scholey
- Country of origin: United Kingdom
- Original language: English
- No. of series: 1
- No. of episodes: 5 or 6 depending on editing

Production
- Producers: 2AM TV; BBC Scotland
- Production locations: Dumbarton, Scotland
- Running time: 60 minutes

Original release
- Network: BBC Three; BBC HD
- Release: 16 June – 14 July 2009

Personal Affairs (also known as P.A's) is a 2009 British television comedy-drama series, broadcast on BBC Three. It starred Annabel Scholey, Laura Aikman, Maimie McCoy and Ruth Negga as four City of London Personal Assistants looking for their lost friend Grace Darling (Olivia Grant).

== Production ==
The interior scenes were filmed at the BBC Scotland drama studios in Dumbarton, whilst most of the exterior scenes were filmed in London.

== Cast ==
=== Main ===
The PAs

- Annabel Scholey – Michelle "Midge" Lerner (Personal assistant to Simon Turner)
- Laura Aikman – Lucy Baxter (Personal assistant to Iain Ebelthite)
- Maimie McCoy – Nicole Palmerston-Amory (Personal assistant to Rachel Klein)
- Ruth Negga – Doris "Sid" Siddiqi (Temporary personal assistant to Rock van Gelder)
- Olivia Grant – Grace Darling (Personal assistant to Rock van Gelder, before she went missing)
- Jamie Davis – Robbie Gascoigne (Personal assistant to Jane Lesser)

The Bosses

- Robert Gant – Rock van Gelder
- Darren Boyd – Simon Turner
- Emily Bruni – Rachel Klein
- Archie Panjabi – Jane Lesser
- Mark Benton – Iain Ebelthite

=== Supporting ===
Recurring:

- Kieran Bew – Avi, Midge's first ever boyfriend
- Joe Absolom – Bob Baxter, Lucy's husband
- Al Weaver – Crawford, Sid's first love (Episodes 1, 2, 5)
- Ben Lloyd-Hughes – Dominic "Fitz" Fitzwallace (Episodes 2–5)
- Anna Kerth – babysitter, (Episode 5)

Minor:

- Annette Badland – Maihri Crawford, Crawford's mother

== Episodes ==
=== Series One ===
- Episode One – "A Decent Proposal"

When Grace's boss Rock proposes, her life begins to unravel in a most unexpected way.

- Episode Two – "Baby Boom or Bust"

The girls visit Grace's mysterious house, Midge's past catches up with her and a surprise visitor helps Lucy decide where her future lies.

- Episode Three – "Between Rock and a Hard Place"

With Grace still missing, a nasty surprise makes the girls fear for her safety.

- Episode Four – "Fool on the Hill"

Will Nicole dare to give love a chance? Midge comes face to face with the past.

- Episode Five – "Vital Statistix"

The girls get closer to finding Grace. A guest brings chaos to the Hartmann Payne party.

- Episode Six – "Connectivity"

The mystery around Grace is finally revealed...

The theme used during the title sequence is 21st Century Life by Sam Sparro.

NB. On the DVD and outside the UK, Series One comprises the six episodes listed here. However, only five episodes were broadcast in the UK. The Episode One BBC3 audiences saw was a 70-minute edited version of "A Decent Proposal" and "Baby Boom or Bust", with 50 minutes cut.

== Reception ==
The series was panned by most reviewers. Alison Graham of the Radio Times called it "life-sappingly dreadful" and asked, "how did a series so crunchingly awful actually make it to a television screen?" Tom Sutcliffe of The Independent described it as "Enid Blyton with added shagging", concluding: "It's terrible, but every now and then it glints oddly in the light in a way that makes it hard to write it off entirely."
