= Moonlight (play) =

- 1994 Grove Press edition
- Written by: Harold Pinter
- Characters: Andy, Bel, Bridget, Fred, Jake, Maria, Ralph
- Original language: English
- Subject: family, love, life, death, and dying
- Genre: drama
- Setting: house and flat

Premiere
- Date premiered: 7 September 1993
- Place premiered: Almeida Theatre, London
- Official website

Moonlight is a play written by Harold Pinter, which premiered at the Almeida Theatre, in London, in September 1993.

== Setting ==
THREE MAIN PLAYING AREAS:

1. Andy's bedroom — well furnished
2. Fred's bedroom — shabby
(These rooms are in different locations.)
3. An area in which Bridget appears, through which Andy moves at night and where Jake, Fred and Bridge play their scene. (Grove Press ed., n. pag.)

== Synopsis ==
Andy, who is on his deathbed,

rehashes his youth, loves, lusts, and betrayals with his wife, [Bel], while simultaneously his two sons [Fred and Jake] – clinical, conspiratorial, the bloodless, intellectual offspring of a hearty anti-intellectual – sit in the shadows, speaking enigmatically and cyclically, stepping around and around the fact of their estrangement from their father, rationalizing their love-hate relations with him and the distance that they are unable to close even when their mother attempts to call them home. In counterpoint to their uncomprehending isolation between the extremes of the death before life and the death after is their younger sister, Bridget, who lightly bridges the gaps between youth and age, death and life. (Back cover of the Grove Press ed.)

== Characters ==
- ANDY, a man in his fifties
- BEL, a woman of fifty
- JAKE, a man of twenty-eight
- FRED, a man of twenty-seven
- MARIA, a woman of fifty
- RALPH, a man in his fifties
- BRIDGET, a girl of sixteen (Grove Press ed., n. pag.)

== Productions ==
=== Premiere ===
First performed at the Almeida Theatre, London, on 7 September 1993; transferred to the Comedy Theatre in November 1993

Cast

- Ian Holm (Andy)
- Anna Massey (Bel)
- Douglas Hodge (Jake)
- Michael Sheen (Fred)
- Jill Johnson (Maria)
- Edward de Souza (Ralph)
- Claire Skinner (Bridget)

Production team

- David Leveaux, director
- Bob Crowley, Designer (HaroldPinter.org)

=== New York premiere ===
At the Laura Pels Theatre, Roundabout Theatre Company, 27 September – 17 December 1995

Opening Night Cast

- Melissa Chalsma (Bridget)
- Blythe Danner (Bel)
- Paul Hecht (Ralph)
- Barry McEvoy (Fred)
- Jason Robards (Andy)
- Liev Schreiber (Jake)
- Kathleen Widdoes (Maria)

Production team

- Karel Reisz, director
- Tony Walton, Set Designer
- Mirena Rada, Costume Designer
- Richard Pilbrow, Lighting Designer
- Tom Clark, Sound Designer (IOBDB)

=== BBC Radio 3 programme ===
Part of Harold Pinter Double Bill (with Voices) originally broadcast to marking Pinter's 75th birthday, in October 2005; rebroadcast as part of the Harold Pinter Tribute on BBC Radio 3's Drama on 3, on 15 February 2009.

Cast

- Harold Pinter (Andy)
- Sara Kestelman (Bel)
- John Shrapnel(Ralph)
- Jill Johnson (Maria)
- Douglas Hodge (Jake)
- Harry Burton (Fred)
- Indira Varma (Bridget)

Production team

- Janet Whitaker, director
- Elizabeth Parker, Music

== Works cited ==
- Pinter, Harold. Moonlight, New York: Grove Press, 1994. ISBN 0-8021-3393-2 (10). ISBN 978-0-8021-3393-9 (13). (Parenthetical references to this edition appear in the text.)
- –––. Moonlight. Harold Pinter Double Bill (with Voices). BBC Radio 3 Drama Programmes – Drama on 3. BBC, 15 February 2009. Web. 15 February 2009. [First broadcast Oct. 2005, as part of Pinter's 75th birthday celebration. Re-broadcast 15 February 2009, as part of Harold Pinter Tribute. (Streaming audio accessible for 7 days after broadcasts).]
