= The Devil's Own Work =

1991 novella by Alan Judd

- First edition (UK)
- Author: Alan Judd
- Cover artist: Gustav Klimt, Judith I, 1901
- Language: English
- Publisher: HarperCollins (UK); Knopf (US)
- Publication date: 1991 (UK); 1994 (US)
- Publication place: United Kingdom
- Media type: Print
- Pages: 96 (UK)
- ISBN: 0-00-223832-2

The Devil's Own Work is a 1991 novella by Alan Judd which won the Guardian Fiction Award. A modern version of the Faust legend, it was inspired by a dinner with Graham Greene, and tells of a pact an author makes with the devil as told by his lifelong friend. In style the work was compared by Publishers Weekly with that of Henry James.

== Plot introduction ==
The unnamed narrator tells of his friend Edward's meeting in the south of France with O. M. (Old Man) Herig, a renowned author. Herig is found dead the following morning and the narrator later learns that Herig was a victim of sexual assault.

== Reception ==
- Elaine Kendall writing for the Los Angeles Times was positive, concluding "Wry and insightful, The Devil's Own Work toys with the notion of demonic possession but becomes a thoroughly realistic and highly original story of revenge; a chilling cautionary tale for literary critics and an unalloyed delight for everyone else".
- The Spectator was similarly enamoured, "a brilliant novella, almost a fable".
- Kirkus Reviews however concluded "Judd seems to intend his tale as an allegory about the price of success, but the connections are strained and the plotting predictable. An uneasy, unhappy, and unproductive mix of Ford Madox Ford and Stephen King.
