= Olivia Grant (actress, born 1983) =

English actress (born 1983)

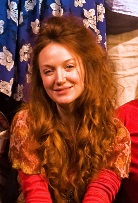
- Grant at the production of The Children's Monologues in 2010
- Born: 20 September 1983 (age 42); London, England
- Education: Guildhall School of Music and Drama; Brasenose College, Oxford
- Occupation: Actress
- Years active: 1986, 2007–present

Olivia Grant (born 20 September 1983) is an English actress. Her first film role was in Stardust (2007), in which she was cast within a couple weeks of graduating from Oxford University. She is perhaps best known for portraying Lady Adelaide Midwinter in BBC's Lark Rise to Candleford, Grace Darling in BBC3's Personal Affairs, Hermione Roddice in Women in Love, Henrietta Armistead in Garrow's Law, Ava Knox in the HBO/Cinemax co-production Strike Back and Madeleine Mathers in Indian Summers for PBS and Channel 4.

== Early life and career ==
Grant was born on 20 September 1983 in southwest London, to Irene Whilton, a costume designer, and Kenneth Grant, a district judge. She was trained in classical ballet and was awarded a place as a Junior Associate of the Royal Ballet School at the age of 10 and she performed with The Royal Ballet at Covent Garden Opera House and the Birmingham Royal Ballet at Sadler's Wells.

Grant then obtained a place at St Paul's Girls' School where she combined her studies with extra-curricular performing; winning a place as a Junior Associate at the Guildhall School of Music and Drama whilst still at school. At Brasenose College, Oxford University she studied English Literature whilst performing in up to two plays a term in parts such as Isabella in Shakespeare's Measure for Measure, Anna in Patrick Marber's Closer, and Natasha in Chekhov's Three Sisters at the Oxford Playhouse.

In her final year at Oxford she was invited by Royal Shakespeare Company producer Thelma Holt and the Cameron Mackintosh Fund to take part in a showcase at the Old Vic Studios, where her monologue performance of Juliet Stevenson from Anthony Minghella's film script Truly Madly Deeply led to her being contacted by leading acting agents in the run up to her finals. Within weeks of graduating Grant was cast in the Paramount film Stardust, in a role which saw her magically transformed from a boy to a goat to a girl by an evil witch Lamia (played by Michelle Pfeiffer). During production she rehearsed at Pinewood Studios with cast members Claire Danes and Robert De Niro.

After her role in Stardust, Grant was cast as one of the leads, Lady Adelaide Midwinter, in BBC1's period drama series Lark Rise to Candleford. She spent six months filming in the Wiltshire countryside alongside cast members Dawn French, Julia Sawalha, and Ben Miles. After finishing the first series she was then cast as the lead Grace Darling in the BBC Three comedy-drama series Personal Affairs in which she played a secret lesbian in the script written by Gabbie Asher.

Grant was then cast with Rhys Ifans in the feature film Mr Nice (dir. Bernard Rose). She worked again with director Charlie Palmer on the ITV classic series Poirot with David Suchet, Geoffrey Palmer, and Anna Massey, playing an undercover spy Annabel Larkin. The BBC invited her to reprise her role as Lady Adelaide in Lark Rise to Candleford, which she did for Series 3. She then played with fellow Oxford alumni Rosamund Pike and Rory Kinnear in BBC Four's production of Women in Love as Hermione Roddice, which was shot in South Africa. Following this, she played the lead role of Sophia in The Picture at the Salisbury Playhouse.

In 2012, Grant played with Rupert Graves as his character's new mistress in the BAFTA-nominated BBC period drama Garrow's Law. She spent the summer filming in Malta on the independent feature film Gozo along with Ophelia Lovibond and appeared in the ITV crime drama series Endeavour as Helen Cartwright. She also returned to South Africa to shoot the Emmy-nominated HBO / Cinemax co-production Strikeback playing Charles Dance's daughter Ava Knox. Other roles that year included Jennifer in the indie feature film Copenhagen, and BBC Worldwide's Cold War television film Legacy which aired in November 2013. She next appeared in Indian Summers, a period drama set during the 1930s British Raj for Channel 4 and PBS that debuted in Spring 2015 in both the UK and US. She then starred in the thriller Breakdown in which she appears alongside Craig Fairbrass, James Cosmo, Bruce Payne and Tamer Hassan. In 2016, she reprised her role as Madeleine Mathers in Indian Summers Series Two, led the film Genesis along with John Hannah and has spent 2016 filming a pilot for NBCUniversal called True Fiction and filming the feature film Heidi: Queen of the Mountains along with Bill Nighy and Mark Williams. She also appeared in the series "Crossing Lines" in the episode "The Velvet Glove", first aired on 2 October 2014.

== Filmography ==
Year	Title	Role	Notes
1986	Brush Strokes	Susie	TV series (1 episode)
2007	Stardust	Girl Bernard	
2007	Fishtales	Angela	Feature film
2008	Lark Rise to Candleford	Lady Adelaide Midwinter	TV series (10 episodes)
2009	Personal Affairs	Grace Darling	TV series
2010	Mr Nice	Alice	
2010	Frankie Teardrop	Diane	Short film
2011	Garrow's Law	Lady Henrietta Armistead	TV series
2011	Women in Love	Lady Hermione Rodice	TV series
2012	Strike Back	Ava Knox	TV series
2013	Endeavour	Helen Cartwright	TV series
2013	Gozo	Christie	
2013	Legacy	Eva Pym	Television film
2013	The Devil Went Down To Islington	Diane Ableau	
2014	Copenhagen	Jennifer	
2014	Pudsey the Dog: The Movie	Leading Lady	
2015	Indian Summers	Madeleine Mathers	TV series
2016	Breakdown	Catherine Jennings	
2016	Genesis	Eve	
2016	True Fiction	Clea Turner	
2017	All the Money in the World	Millicent	
2017	Heidi: Queen of the Mountains	Miss Rottenmeier	
2019	The Last Vermeer	Cootje Hennings	
2020	Watch Dogs: Legion	Skye Larsen (Voice)	Video Game
2021	The Irregulars	Patricia Colman Jones	TV series
2021	The Box	Sylvian Rosen	TV series
2021	Prodigal Son	Summer Hansen	TV series
