= Women in Love =

1920 novel by D. H. Lawrence

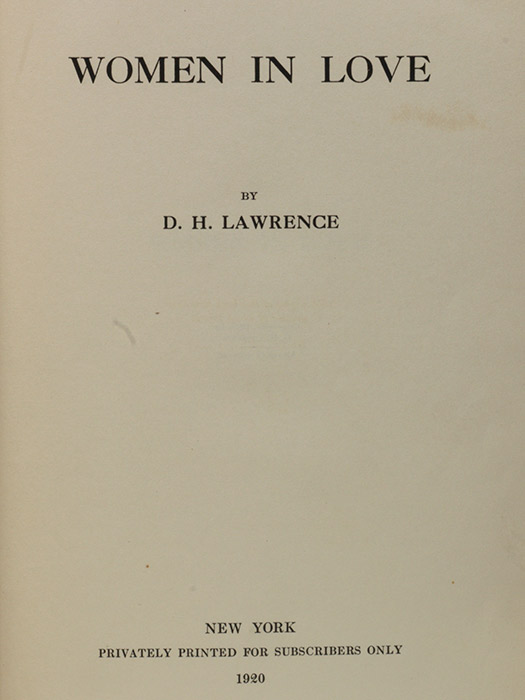
- Title page of the first edition
- Author: D. H. Lawrence
- Language: English
- Genre: Novel
- Publisher: Thomas Seltzer
- Publication date: 1920
- Media type: Print (hardcover and paperback)
- Pages: 536 (first edition hardcover)
- Preceded by: The Rainbow
- Followed by: The Lost Girl

Women in Love is a 1920 novel by English author D. H. Lawrence. It is a sequel to his 1915 novel The Rainbow, and follows the continuing loves and lives of the Brangwen sisters, Gudrun and Ursula. Gudrun Brangwen, an artist, pursues a destructive relationship with Gerald Crich, an industrialist. Lawrence contrasts this pair with the love that develops between Ursula Brangwen and Rupert Birkin, an alienated intellectual who articulates many opinions associated with the author. The emotional relationships thus established are given further depth and tension by an intense psychological and physical attraction between Gerald and Rupert.

The novel ranges over the whole of British society before the time of the First World War and eventually concludes in the snows of the Tyrolean Alps. Ursula's character draws on Lawrence's wife Frieda and Gudrun's on Katherine Mansfield, while Rupert Birkin's has elements of Lawrence himself, and Gerald Crich is partly based on Mansfield's husband, John Middleton Murry.

== Synopsis ==
Ursula and Gudrun Brangwen are sisters living around the Erewash Valley on the Nottinghamshire-Derbyshire border in the 1910s. Ursula is a schoolteacher, Gudrun a painter. They meet two men who live nearby, school inspector Rupert Birkin and Gerald Crich, heir to a coal mine, and the four become friends. Romantic relationships quickly develop as the novel progresses.

All four are deeply concerned with questions of society, politics, and the relationship between men and women. At a party at Shortlands, the Crich family's country manor home, Gerald's sister Diana drowns. Gudrun becomes the teacher and mentor of Gerald's youngest sister. Soon, Gerald's coal-mine-owning father dies as well, after a long illness. After the funeral, Gerald goes to Gudrun's house and spends the night with her while her parents sleep in another room.

Birkin asks Ursula to marry him, and she agrees. Gerald and Gudrun's relationship, however, becomes stormy.

The two couples take a holiday together in the Austrian Alps. Gudrun begins an intense friendship with Loerke, a physically puny but emotionally commanding artist from Dresden. Gerald, enraged by Loerke and most of all by Gudrun's verbal abuse and rejection of his manhood, and driven by his own internal violence, tries to strangle Gudrun. He suddenly becomes repulsed by his actions and lets her go. He leaves Gudrun and Loerke to climb the mountain, eventually slipping into a snowy valley where he falls asleep and freezes to death.

The impact of Gerald's death upon Birkin is profound. The novel ends a few weeks after Gerald's death with Birkin trying to explain to Ursula that, although he needed no other woman than Ursula, he valued a relationship with Gerald that is gone forever.

== Publication history ==
After years of misunderstandings, accusations of duplicity, and hurried letters, Thomas Seltzer finally published the first edition of Women in Love in New York City, on 9 November 1920. This had come after three drawn out years of delays and revisions. This first limited edition (1,250 books) was available only to subscribers, due to the controversy caused by Lawrence's previous work, The Rainbow (1915).

Originally, the two books were written as parts of a single novel, but the publisher had decided to publish them separately and in rapid succession. The first book's treatment of sexuality was frank for the mores of the time, and, after an obscenity trial, the book was banned in the UK for 11 years, although it was available in the US. The publisher then backed out of publishing the second book in the UK, so Women in Love first appeared in the US. Martin Secker published the first trade edition of Women in Love in London, on 10 June 1921.

== Reception ==
As with most of Lawrence's works, Women in Love's sexual subject matter caused controversy. For example, W. Charles Pilley, an early reviewer wrote of it in John Bull, "I do not claim to be a literary critic, but I know dirt when I smell it, and here is dirt in heaps—festering, putrid heaps which smell to high Heaven." Lawrence was sued for libel by Lady Ottoline Morrell and others, who claimed their likenesses were unjustly drawn upon in The Rainbow. The book also later stirred criticism for its portrayal of love, and was denounced as chauvinistic and centred upon the phallus by the philosopher Simone de Beauvoir in The Second Sex (1949).

In contrast, the critic Camille Paglia praised Women in Love, writing in Vamps and Tramps (1994) that, though she initially reacted negatively to the book, it became a "profound influence" on her as she was working on Sexual Personae (1990). Paglia compared Lawrence's novel to the poet Edmund Spenser's The Faerie Queene (1590). Paglia observed that, though Women in Love has "bisexual implications", she is skeptical that Lawrence would have endorsed "full sexual relations" between men. The critic Harold Bloom listed Women in Love in his The Western Canon (1994) as among the important and influential books in Western culture. Frances Spalding suggested that Lawrence's fascination with the theme of homosexuality is manifested in Women in Love, and that this could be related to his own sexual orientation. In 1999, the Modern Library ranked Women in Love forty-ninth on a list of the 100 best novels in English of the 20th century.

== Adaptations ==
=== Film adaptation ===
Screenwriter and producer Larry Kramer and director Ken Russell adapted the novel into the film, Women in Love (1969), for which Glenda Jackson won the Academy Award for Best Actress. It was one of the first American theatrical films to show male genitals, in scenes when Gerald Crich (Oliver Reed) and Rupert Birkin (Alan Bates) wrestle in the nude in front of a roaring fireplace, in several early skinny dipping shots, and in an explicit sequence of Birkin running naked in the forest after being hit on the head by his spurned former mistress, Hermione Roddice (Eleanor Bron).

=== Radio and television adaptations ===
William Ivory combined Women in Love with Lawrence's earlier novel, The Rainbow (1915), in his two-part BBC Four television adaptation titled, Women in Love (first transmitted 24 and 31 March 2011), directed by Miranda Bowen. The cast is headed by Saskia Reeves as the mother, Anna Brangwen, with Rachael Stirling and Rosamund Pike as her daughters, Ursula and Gudrun. Other cast members include Rory Kinnear as Rupert Birkin, Joseph Mawle as Gerald Crich, and Ben Daniels as Will Brangwen. In this adaptation, Ivory sets the final scenes and Gerald's death not in the Tyrolean Alps, but in South African diamond mines and desert sands, where Gerald walks out in the dunes and meets his demise.

BBC Radio 4 broadcast Women in Love as a four-part serial in 1996, dramatised by Elaine Feinstein and starring Stella Gonet as Gudrun, Clare Holman as Ursula, Douglas Hodge as Gerald and Nicholas Farrell as Rupert. It has been repeated several times on BBC Radio 4 Extra, most recently in July 2022.

== Editions ==
- Lawrence, D.H. (1920). Women in Love (Privately Printed ed.). New York: Thomas Seltzer.
- Lawrence, D.H. (1921). Women in Love (Trade ed.). London: Martin Secker.
- Lawrence, D.H. (1982). Ross, Charles L. (ed.). Women in Love. Harmondsworth, Middlesex: Penguin.
- Lawrence, D.H.; Farmer, David; Vasey, Lindeth; Worthen, John (1987). Women in Love (The Cambridge Edition of the Letters and Works of D. H. Lawrence ed.). Cambridge: Cambridge University Press.
- Lawrence, D.H.; Farmer, David; Vasey, Lindeth; Worthen, John; Kinkead-Weekes, M. (1995). Women in Love. Harmondsworth: Penguin. ISBN 978-0-14-062161-7.
- Lawrence, D.H. (1998). Bradshaw, David (ed.). Women in Love. Oxford: Oxford University Press. ISBN 978-0-521-37326-5.
- Lawrence, D.H. (1998) [1916–17]. Worthen, John & Vasey, Lindeth (eds.). The First Women in Love (The Cambridge Edition of the Letters and Works of D. H. Lawrence ed.). Cambridge University Press. ISBN 0-521-37326-3. (This edition displays significant differences from the final published version.)
- Lawrence, D.H. "Prologue". The Cambridge Edition of the Letters and Works of D. H. Lawrence. Cambridge University Press. pp. 489–506. (This discarded section of an early version of the novel is set four years after Gerald and Birkin have returned from a skiing holiday, and was published as an appendix to The Cambridge Edition.)
- Lawrence, D.H. (2007). The First Women in Love. Oneworld Classics. ISBN 978-1-84749-005-6.

== Literary criticism ==
- Beynon, Richard, ed. (1997). D. H. Lawrence: The Rainbow and Women in Love. Cambridge: Icon Books.
- Black, Michael (2001). Lawrence's England: The Major Fiction, 1913 – 1920. Palgrave-MacMillan.
- Chaudhuri, A.; Paulin, Tim (2003). D.H Lawrence and 'Difference': Postcoloniality and the Poetry of the Present (UEA Repository (Book) ed.). Oxford University Press. ISBN 0-19-926052-4.
- Delany, Paul (1978). D. H. Lawrence's Nightmare: The Writer and his Circle in the Years of the Great War. Hassocks: Harvester Press.
- Leavis, F.R. (1955). D. H. Lawrence: Novelist. London: Chatto and Windus.
- Leavis, F.R. (1976). Thought, Words and Creativity: Art and Thought in D. H. Lawrence. London: Chatto and Windus. ISBN 978-0-7011-2182-2.
- Oates, Joyce Carol (Spring 1978). "Lawrence's Götterdämmerung: The Apocalyptic Vision of Women in Love". Critical Inquiry.
- Ross, Charles L. (1991). Women in Love: A Novel of Mythic Realism. Boston, MA: Twayne.
- Worthen, John (1989). "The Restoration of Women in Love". In Preston, Peter; Hoare, Peter (eds.). D. H. Lawrence in the Modern World. London: Macmillan. pp. 7–26.
