= Freefall (2009 film) =

2009 British television film

Freefall is a BBC television film written and directed by Dominic Savage, that premiered on BBC Two on 14 July 2009.

Set in autumn 2007, Freefall is a dramatic satire of the mortgage crisis that led to the worldwide economic downturn. Dominic Cooper stars as Dave Matthews, a charismatic corporate psychopath who sells mortgages in Watford, Hertfordshire, to families denied credit whether they can afford repayment or not. In the series, Dave meets up with an old school friend, Jim Potter (played by Joseph Mawle) who becomes another of Dave's mortgage victims. Despite a confrontation from Jim, Dave feels nothing and moves on to sell expensive solar panel packages to upper-middle-class house wives. Aidan Gillen stars as Gus, a high flying workaholic who sells corporate mortgages.

This film highlights the delusional atmosphere of all walks of life prior to the economic collapse, from the naive working-class Jim to the high-flying workaholic Gus. Even Dave believes his own unfounded salesman spiel, crippling himself with a colossal £800,000 mortgage he quickly has to dispose of to "some rich mug". The film portrays the varying degrees of the collapse's effect on the different types of people involved, with Dave simply moving on to a different job compared to a complete breakdown and tragic end for Gus (shockingly the case for some bankers of the time).

A critic noted that the series' take on the credit crunch by writer and director Savage had heartfelt approach, but was hurt with the lack of subtlety.

== Cast ==
- Dominic Cooper as Dave Matthews
- Aidan Gillen as Gus
- Joseph Mawle as Jim Potter
- Riz Ahmed as Gary
- Alfie Allen as Ian
- Anna Maxwell Martin as Mandy
- Rosamund Pike as Anna
