= Wilfred Saunders =

British librarian and academic

Professor Wilfred Leonard Saunders CBE (18 April 1920 – 27 July 2007) was a British librarian and the founding director of what became the University of Sheffield Information School.

Saunders was born on 18 April 1920 in Birmingham and joined Birmingham Reference Library as a library assistant in 1936, influenced by his elder sister who was a librarian. Early in World War II he was a radio operator with the British Expeditionary Force in France, and his diaries from this time were used as a source for the BBC documentary Dunkirk. After the war he gained a degree in economics from the University of Cambridge, and was deputy librarian at the Institute of Bankers (1948-1949) before returning to Birmingham as the founding librarian at the University of Birmingham's Institute of Education (1949-1956). He moved to the University of Sheffield in 1956 as deputy librarian.

In April 1963 he took up the post of director of the university's new Postgraduate School of Librarianship, the second postgraduate school in the United Kingdom after that at University College London. The school took its first intake of students in September 1964. He was appointed as professor of librarianship in 1968, and remained at the school until his retirement in 1982.

His 1989 Towards a unified professional organization for library and information science and services : a personal view, known as The Saunders Report, proposed that the Library Association and the Institute of Information Scientists should combine: this finally took place in 2002 with the establishment of the Chartered Institute of Library and Information Professionals (CILIP). He served as president of the Library Association in 1980, and was a council member of Aslib (1965-1971 and 1973-1979) and the first chair of the Library and Information Services Council (1981-1984).

A festschrift in his honour was published in 1989 on the 25th anniversary of the founding of the school.

He was appointed CBE in the 1982 New Year Honours, and was awarded an honorary Litt.D. by the University of Sheffield in 1989.

Saunders died on 27 July 2007 and was survived by his wife Joan and their two sons.

== Selected publications ==
- Saunders, W. L. (2010). Dunkirk diary of a very young soldier ([Rev. and expanded] ed.). Studley: Brewin Books. ISBN 9781858584614., originally published 1989 by Birmingham Public Libraries, 1989 ISBN 9780709301639
- A guide to book lists and bibliographies for the use of school librarians (1956) compiled for the School Library Association by W.L. Saunders
- Schur, Herbert; Saunders, W.L. (1968). Education and training for scientific and technological library and information work. London: H.M.S.O. ISBN 9780112700074.
- Saunders, W. L. (1989). Towards a unified professional organization for library and information science and services : a personal view. Library Association on behalf of Aslib, The Association for Information Management. ISBN 0-85365-659-2. "The Saunders Report"
