= Dunkirk (TV series) =

2004 BBC television docudrama

- Genre: Docudrama
- Written by: Alex Holmes; Neil McKay; Lisa Osborne
- Directed by: Alex Holmes
- Starring: Simon Russell Beale; Clive Brunt; Phil Cornwell
- Narrated by: Timothy Dalton
- Composer: Samuel Sim
- Country of origin: United Kingdom
- Original language: English
- No. of seasons: 1
- No. of episodes: 3

Production
- Executive producers: Mike Dormer; Peter Lovering; Laura Mackie
- Producer: Rob Warr
- Editor: Oliver Huddleston
- Running time: 60 minutes

Original release
- Network: BBC Two
- Release: 18 February – 20 February 2004

Related
- Dunkirk: The Soldiers' Story; The Other Side of Dunkirk

Dunkirk is a 2004 BBC Television docudrama about the Battle of Dunkirk and the Dunkirk evacuation in World War II.

== Background ==
Dunkirk used archive film footage, eyewitness accounts and original dramatised sequences to describe the events of the 1940 Dunkirk evacuation. The BBC also included an interactive 'red button' facility allowing television viewers to reach further information. The documentary has been described as helping the BBC build 'Digital Britain' and fulfil its public service remit.

== Episodes ==
=== "Retreat" ===
Day 1: Captain Bill Tennant, Royal Navy, at the Admiralty receives reports of the British Expeditionary Force's retreat and prepares to oversee Operation Dynamo. Private Alf Tombs and his decimated company rest at Wormhoudt on the western end of the corridor to Dunkirk. New Prime Minister Winston Churchill chairs a briefing of the War Cabinet where Foreign Secretary Lord Halifax presses for peace negotiations. Adolf Hitler has halted the Blitzkrieg, giving Tombs's company time to consolidate their position and Signalmen Clive Tonry and Wilf Saunders return to offer support.

Day 2: Tennant sails from Dover on HMS Wolfhound to find the Port of Dunkirk wrecked by enemy bombardment. Divisions between Churchill and Halifax deepen over the proposed mediation of Fascist Italy, threatening a leadership crisis. Embarkation progresses slowly and Tennant signals the Queen of the Channel to come alongside the eastern breakwater to speed up the process.

Day 3: Tonry and Saunders intercept enemy orders for a pincer movement on Dunkirk. Tombs's company is forced to pull back as it comes under fire and Tonry and Saunders head into the front line in a last-ditch attempt to hold open the corridor. After nine hours of fighting, the line breaks as Tombs's company surrenders to the advancing enemy and Tonry and Saunders retreat to Dunkirk. Tombs narrowly escapes as the rest of his company is massacred but is later recaptured and spends the rest of the war in a POW camp.

Day 4: Tennant orders all vessels to be brought up to the eastern breakwater at once for embarkation as numbers on the beach swell. Churchill decrees that the wounded should be left behind to speed up the retreat. The enemy launch aerial attacks on the beaches from captured Royal Air Force airfields south of Dunkirk, sinking 30 British ships and leaving 400,000 allied troops stranded on the beach.

=== "Evacuation" ===
Day 5: Vice-Admiral Bertram Ramsay and Captain Michael Denny at Dover issue the request for more inshore craft. Captain Tom Halsey and navigator David Mellis hold their destroyer, HMS Malcolm, off the coast while small boats ferry troops to her. BEF commander Lord Gort, contemplating his unauthorised order to retreat from a villa overlooking the beach and organises a final defensive perimeter. French Admiral Jean Abrial first learns of the British evacuation from Tennant as French troops swell the numbers on the beach. Lieutenant-General Sir Henry Pownall reports the problem to Churchill.

When the cockleboat Renown is amongst those small boats requisitioned, Captain Harry Noakes and his crew volunteer to stay on for the mission to France. With a large percentage of the British fleet tied up in the rescue operation, Churchill orders the gassing of Britain's south coast to ward off invasion. Gort and Tennant argue over the evacuation strategy as the HQ comes under artillery fire. Churchill, refusing to send support to the beleaguered French at the Somme, agrees instead that their troops will be evacuated from Dunkirk on an equal basis.

Day 6: The Renown joins the hundreds of small craft that narrowly avoid running aground in order to rescue the troops from the French beaches. HMS Malcolm collects her passengers from the eastern breakwater, where she comes under bombardment. Major-General Harold Alexander takes command after Gort is ordered back to London. HMS Malcolm returns to Dover where Holsey and Mellis contemplate the friends that they have lost on other ships. The Renown safely delivers its passengers to Dover but is destroyed by a mine on its way home. Tonry and Saunders are amongst the two-thirds of the BEF evacuated safely back to England but 200,000 allied troops remain on the beach as the perimeter comes under attack from advancing enemy forces.

=== "Deliverance" ===
Day 6: Lieutenant Jimmy Langley and Major Angus McCorquodale of the Coldstream Guards receive orders to hold the perimeter for one last night. Abrial, learning from Alexander of the imminent British pullout that will leave many French troops still on the beach, threatens to close the port. Philip Newman cares for the wounded left behind at the casualty clearing station in an abandoned château on the outskirts of Dunkirk. Alexander and Tennant promise Abrial one last day to evacuate the French troops.

Day 7: Langley's company engages the enemy at dawn as an exhausted Newman struggles to get the wounded to safety. Tennant informs Newman of the policy to de-prioritise the wounded and asks him to hold out for one more day. Enemy troops advancing on the perimeter use civilians as a shield and Langley has to rely on rifle fire to hold them back. Holsey and Mellis arrive on board HMS Malcolm on their fifth rescue mission under heavy fire. Newman remains to care for the wounded with a skeleton staff as the rest of the station staff withdraw. As the rearguard pull out, leaving the perimeter to be defended by the French, a badly wounded Langley is abandoned on the beach.

Day 8: Desmond Thorogood arrives in Dunkirk but must wait until nightfall for rescue. Ramsay meticulously plans the night's operations. When it is over, Tennant sends his last signal from Dunkirk and embarks for home; he gets his first sleep on the train to London.

Day 9: Newman discovers the abandoned Langley and takes him into the station. The French troops covering the evacuation did not make it out in time so another night's operations are required to pull them out. HMS Malcolm sets out on her ninth mission to Dunkirk.

Day 10: Returning safely to Dover, the Malcolm's crew are granted three days leave. The operation is deemed a success, Churchill looks to the skies for what will be the next threat of total war. Dunkirk finally falls to the enemy but the rescued troops of the BEF make up the core of Britain's wartime army.

== Cast ==
- Simon Russell Beale as Winston Churchill
- Clive Brunt as Private Alf Tombs
- Phil Cornwell as Harry Noakes
- Benedict Cumberbatch as Lieutenant Jimmy Langley
- Ricci Harnett as Guardsman Desmond Thorogood
- Nicholas Jones as Major Angus McCorquodale
- Michael Legge as Signalman Wilf Saunders
- James Loye as Lieutenant David Mellis
- Kevin McNally as Major-General Harold Alexander
- Roland Manookian as Frankie Osborne
- Alex Noodle as Lukie Osborne
- Adrian Rawlins as Captain Bill Tennant
- Rick Warden as Major Philip Newman
- Ben Abell as Corporal Gill
- Nicholas Asbury as Captain Michael Denny
- Richard Attlee as Clement Attlee
- Alex Avery as Captain J Hendry
- Mark Bagnall as Private Robert Garside
- Nick Bagnall as Leading Seaman Harold Porter
- Richard Bremmer as Vice-Admiral Bertram Ramsay
- Osmund Bullock as Colonel Whitfield
- John Carlisle as General Lord Gort
- Samantha Cooper as Lukie's Girlfriend
- Richard Durden as Lord Halifax
- Jack Fortune as Anthony Eden
- Christopher Good as Neville Chamberlain
- Glyn Grimstead as Donah Osborne
- William Hope as Cdr J Campbell Clouston
- Julian Kerridge as Corp Tich Humphreys
- Geoffrey Kirkness as Vice-Admiral Tom Phillips
- Joseph Mawle as Lieutenant Ian Cox
- Sid Mitchell as Private Osborne
- Scott James Moutter as Private G D S Gould
- Sean Murray as Captain Tom Halsey
- Michael O'Connor as Padre (CF3) Cockie O'Shea
- Andre Oumansky as Admiral Jean Abrial
- Lee Ross as Sergeant Moore
- Richard De Sousa as Private J Short
- Richard Sutton as Signalman Clive Tonry
- Daniel Weyman as Captain James Lynn-Allen
- Clive Wood as Acting Lieutenant-General Henry Pownall
- Timothy Dalton as Narrator

== Reception ==
=== Reviews ===
Reviews were mixed, though The Telegraph thought the documentary portrayed the events very fairly. They singled out Simon Russell Beale's portrayal of Winston Churchill as "in a superior class altogether".

=== Awards ===
- BAFTA Awards 2005
  - Won: Huw Wheldon Award for Specialist Factual: Robert Warr & Alex Holmes
  - Nominated: BAFTA TV Award for Best Editing (Factual): Oliver Huddleston
- Biarritz International Festival of Audiovisual Programming 2005
  - Won: Golden FIPA for TV Series and Serials (Music): Samuel Sim
- Royal Television Society 2004
  - Nominated: RTS Television Award for Best Make Up Design (Entertainment & Non-Drama)
  - Nominated: RTS Television Award for Best Sound (Entertainment & Non-Drama)
