= A Breed of Heroes =

Book by Alan Judd

- First edition
- Author: Alan Judd
- Language: English
- Publisher: Hodder and Stoughton
- Publication date: 1981
- Publication place: United Kingdom
- Pages: 288 pp
- ISBN: 0-340-26334-2
- OCLC: 7905091
- LC Class: PR6060.U32 B7x 1983
- Followed by: Legacy

A Breed of Heroes is a 1981 novel by Alan Judd. It narrates in third person the experiences of a young British Army officer as he is deployed on his first tour of duty, a four-month operation in Armagh and Belfast at the height of The Troubles.

== Plot introduction ==
Set in the 1970s, ‘’A Breed of Heroes’’ follows the deployment of young British Army officer Charles Thoroughgood on a four-month emergency tour of Northern Ireland. Charles is new to the army and the difficulty he has with adjusting to army life adds to the complications faced in Northern Ireland. Being an Oxford graduate at a time when over 90% of army officers were school leavers makes him a conspicuous target for his eccentric commanding officer’s attention, as well as three to four years older than his fellow Second Lieutenants.

== Plot summary ==
The first month of the tour is spent in the countryside of Armagh, where Charles’ battalion make their presence felt by ending all British Army contact with the locals and pursuing a deliberately more aggressive stance than the previous garrison unit. The month is mainly boring, with most days spent carrying out menial tasks in barracks or conducting patrols. However, towards the end of the period an anti-vehicle mine meant for Charles’ regular Land Rover patrol to an electricity sub-station destroys an electricity board van minutes before Charles arrives. Seeing his first explosion, as well as finding the scattered body parts of a man who should have been him and his soldiers, brings the realities of his situation home to him and increases his thoughts that he should never have joined the army: something which he must tackle throughout the book.

In moving to Belfast for the remaining three months of the tour, things take a turn for the worse – something Charles thought couldn't happen after the endless boredom and sporadic fear of Armagh. Billeted in a working factory which produces bottles 24 hours a day, his company’s quarters are ridiculed by the entire Belfast garrison as the worst in the city. The floor given over to officers for accommodation, dining and radio watch-keeping consists of ‘rooms’ created only by cardboard separations. As well as the deprivations of the location, Charles finds the customs of army life difficult to understand and get used to, especially as they seem to have no logic behind them.

The officers and men of his battalion learn to deal with the pressures and squalor of urban guerrilla warfare by drinking, making mischief and engaging in sexual orgies. Charles, always aloof from his brother officers and institutionally separated from his men, finds it hard not to constantly question his own competency and worth, both as an officer and a human being. Having been involved in two riots, he is moved to Battalion Headquarters after the Press Relations Officer (PRO) has a negligent discharge and shoots himself in the foot. Charles shares his room with the Adjutant, and sets about ensuring that the battalion is seen in a good light by the press. This task is complicated somewhat by his Commanding Officer's hatred of the press and idiosyncratic way of doing things, but Charles finds living in the police station which houses HQ much more bearable than the grim surrounds of the factory.

More escapades follow, with Charles being involved in heart racing riots and close scrapes with members of the Provisional Irish Republican Army, as well as comic activities with his brother officers. His job as PRO leads him into contact with Beazely, a disreputable journalist, who pays Charles and his Lance Corporal photographer to write and send his dispatches, thus allowing himself to avoid danger and sit in his hotel bar.

Charles’ slightly more pleasant life at HQ ends abruptly, however, with the bombing of the police station. The adjutant is killed and their room destroyed, leading Charles to be sent back to the Factory but still in his role as PRO. More brilliantly described riots and arms finds occur, while Charles realises that he both enjoys and excels at journalism through his arrangement with Beazely. Charles resolves to leave the army, and eventually amasses enough money to buy himself out of his contract which runs for another few years. His resignation is accepted, and he gains permission to leave on his battalion's return to England.

The climactic scene of the book involves Charles and his CO in a gun battle with some young IRA gunmen. Fighting through an alley, Charles fires at an armed man in his twenties. He misses his target several times, before hitting his mark and killing the man. As Charles and the CO run on up the alley an unarmed teenage boy jumps out from the side. Charles points his gun at him and shouts, "Don't move!", then the CO shoots the unarmed boy twice killing him. Charles’ reaction to his first kill is necessarily short, the battalion is preparing to leave Northern Ireland and return home. The novel ends with Charles, for the first time in the novel, being completely at ease, enjoying a parachute drop into England and revelling in the fact that all he has to worry about is the drop itself.

== Characters ==
2nd Lt. Charles Thoroughgood – Main Character, Platoon Commander then Battalion Press Relations Officer

Janet – Charles’ girlfriend

Lt. Col. Ian Gowrie MC – Commanding Officer of No. 1 Army Assault Commando (Airborne)

Major Edward Lumley – Officer Commanding, A Company, AAC(A)

WOI (RSM) Bone – Regimental Sergeant Major, AAC(A) and Charles’ nemesis

Major Anthony Hamilton-Smith – Second in command, AAC(A)

Sgt. Wheeler – Charles’ loafing platoon sergeant

Capt. Henry Sandy – Battalion medical officer and ‘famous cad’

Beazley – Northern Ireland Correspondent for The Times

== Awards and nominations ==
A Breed of Heroes won the 1981 Winifred Holtby Memorial Prize and was shortlisted and became runner-up in the 1981 Booker Prize

== Film, TV or theatrical adaptations ==
A Breed of Heroes was adapted for a BBC Television production by Charles Wood, starring Samuel West in 1994.

== Sequel ==
The story of Charles Thoroughgood is continued in Alan Judd's 1996 novel Legacy, having left the military he now works for MI6.

== Release details ==
- 1981 Hardback - ISBN 0-340-26334-2
- 1982 Paperback - ISBN 0-00-616458-7
- 1993 Paperback - ISBN 0-00-654535-1
