= David Leveaux =

British theatre director (born 1957)

- Born: 13 December 1957 (age 67); Leicester, England, United Kingdom
- Education: Manchester University
- Occupation(s): Film and theatre director

David Leveaux (born 13 December 1957) is an English film and theatre director.

He has been nominated for five Tony Awards as director of both plays and musicals. He directs in the UK, working at the Royal Shakespeare Company, the Almeida Theatre, and the Donmar Warehouse – as well as on Broadway in New York City, and also in Tokyo.

Leveaux made his film directorial debut with The Exception, which was released by A24 in 2017.

== Early life and education ==
Leveaux was born in Leicester and raised in Derby in the Midlands, the son of a cardiologist. He read English language and literature at Manchester University.

== Career ==
In his early 20s, Leveaux became assistant to Peter Gill at Riverside Studios in Hammersmith, London. When the studios became bankrupt, he was one of a group who occupied the building illegally to keep it running until it was reestablished legitimately.

While taking a break in New York City, he discovered Eugene O'Neill's play, A Moon for the Misbegotten, and revived it at Riverside, starring Frances de la Tour and Ian Bannen. The production transferred to the West End and Broadway (1984). Bannen again starred, opposite Kate Nelligan in the Broadway version.

Subsequently, he directed Therese Raquin at Chichester, Anna Christie in London and on Broadway, and Romeo and Juliet for the Royal Shakespeare Company. At the Almeida Theatre, he directed Harold Pinter's No Man's Land, Moonlight, Betrayal and Neil LaBute's The Distance From Here (2002).

He was the artistic director of Theatre Project Tokyo, directing productions in Tokyo, including Electra (1995), Lulu (1999), Modern Noh Plays, The Changeling, Hedda Gabler, and Two Headed Eagle.

He was the associate director of the Donmar Warehouse, under Sam Mendes' artistic directorship. His revival of the musical Nine at the Donmar in 1996 transferred to Broadway in 2003 with Antonio Banderas, where Leveaux received a nomination for a Tony Award for Best Direction of a Musical and the musical itself won the Tony Award for Best Revival of a Musical.

He directed Electra in 1997, for which Zoë Wanamaker received an Olivier Award.

He received an Olivier Award nomination for Best Director for his 1999 revival of Tom Stoppard's The Real Thing.

In 2003, he revived Tom Stoppard's Jumpers for the Royal National Theatre in London. This then toured the UK regions before eventually transferring to Broadway in 2004.

He directed Cyrano de Bergerac (2007) on Broadway, starring Kevin Kline, with Ben Brantley writing in The New York Times:

"Mr. Leveaux, the British director of the exquisite-looking Broadway productions of Nine and Jumpers, does pretty better than most of his peers, which is his blessing and his curse. (Even Fiddler on the Roof, in his hands, suggested a Vogue layout on Shtetl Chic.) He also has a strong sentimental streak, tempered by his aesthetic sense. He is the perfect man to bring Cyrano into the 21st century, presenting the play's flowery sensibility without making audiences feel they’ve been doused in perfume."

He directed the first West End revival of Tom Stoppard's Arcadia, which opened in May 2009.

== Michael Riedel controversy ==
In 2005, Leveaux was in an altercation with New York Post columnist Michael Riedel at Angus McIndoe, a Manhattan restaurant and theatre hangout. Riedel, who later admitted to being "tipsy", insulted Leveaux by claiming that English directors often ruin classic American musicals. While rumours circulated that Leveaux hit Riedel so hard that the columnist had to go to the emergency room, the truth is that Riedel was merely shoved to the floor and was not injured.

== Work ==
Broadway

- A Moon for the Misbegotten (1984) – Tony Award nomination, Best Direction of a Play
- Anna Christie (1993) – Tony Award nomination, Best Direction of a Play
- Electra (1998)
- The Real Thing (2000) – Tony Award nomination, Best Direction of a Play
- Betrayal (2000)
- Nine (2003) – Tony Award nomination, Best Direction of a Musical and Drama Desk Award nomination, Outstanding Director of a Musical
- Fiddler on the Roof (2004)
- Jumpers (2004) – Tony Award nomination, Best Direction of a Play
- The Glass Menagerie (2005)
- Cyrano de Bergerac (2007)
- Arcadia (2011)
- Romeo and Juliet (2013)

Donmar Warehouse

- Nine (1996)
- Electra (1997)
- The Real Thing (1999) (transferred to the Albery Theatre, January 2000)
- Closer (2015)

Almeida Theatre

- Betrayal (1991)
- No Man's Land (1992) (transferred to Comedy Theatre, 1993)
- Moonlight (1993)
- The Distance From Here (2002)

Duke of York's Theatre

- Backbeat (2011)

Film

- The Exception (2016)
