= Verona Verbakel =

Belgian actress (born 1992)

Verona Aurora Verbakel
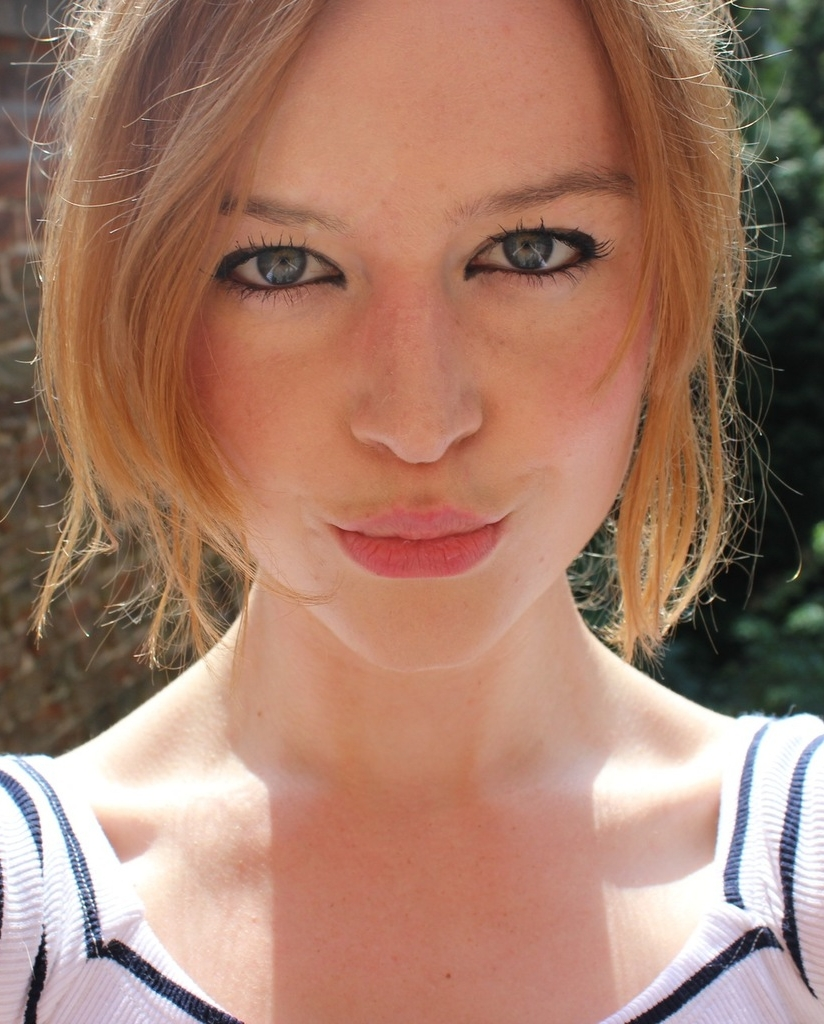
- 2015
- Born: 15 September 1992 (age 32); Ghent, Belgium
- Occupation: Actress

Verona Verbakel (born 15 September 1992) is a Belgian actress.

== Acting career ==
Verona Verbakel has been working with theater company Ontroerend Goed since 2009. She was cast in theater productions Once and for all we're gonna tell you who we are so shut up and listen (in the English, French, German and Italian version) and Teenage Riot.

For Sirens (2014-2017), a feminist performance from the same theater company, she received The stage award for acting excellence for Best Ensemble at the Edinburgh Festival Fringe 2014.

In 2013, she performed The depth of the valley by Rataplan and director Dimitri Leue.

In 2014 she graduated Magna cum laude at the Royal Conservatory Antwerp (BE) for Drama Acting, one of her teachers being Ivo van Hove from ITA.

From 2015 until 2018 she performed her theatre solo The Audition. In 2017 she performed La democrazia in America by Italian director Romeo Castellucci. From 2016 until 2019 she played the lead in Liv by The Mannschaft. In 2018 she performed Das Reingold/Half of the Ring by Dutch theatre company De Warme Winkel. In 2019 her dance solo Pablo premiered at Vooruit Ghent with the support of Dansvitrine. From 2020 until 2022 she performed Work Harder by Dutch theatre company Wunderbaum and Belgian actress and directress Lies Pauwels, in the Dutch and German version. Her performance Well-Behaved Women Seldom Make History premiered at De Parade Utrecht and the Edinburgh Fringe Festival 2022. In 2023, her theater performance Voyeur premiered at the Amsterdam Fringe Festival in De Brakke Grond, coached by Lies Pauwels. August 2024 saw the premiere of the theater performance Het Ego at Theater Aan Zee in Ostend, a production in collaboration with Anemone Valcke. In September 2024, The Ego premiered at the Amsterdam Fringe Festival at De Sloot. The Dutch newspaper NRC gave the performance a four-star review: 'The most outspoken indictment comes from the Flemish actresses Anemone Valcke & Verona Verbakel in the English-language The Ego.'

Some of her movie and television parts include: Margaret Kelley in A Quiet Passion by Terence Davies as the maid of Emily Dickinson by Cynthia Nixon; a Wehrmacht Secretary in The Exception, Hilde in the French movie Rattrapage, Polly in Out of the blue, into the black; as a German punkerin in Dunkelstadt and various parts in Flemish television series such as Chanelle in Slippery Ice, Vicky in Undercover 3 and Liv in Under Fire. In 2022, she played Nora in Two Summers, directed by Tom Lenaerts and Brecht Van Hoenacker, and she played Beatrice Lemutte in the fourth season of Documentary Now!. In 2023 she played Stefanie Courtois in the Irish-Belgian co-production Hidden Assets 2. In 2024 she played Linda in the second season of Flemish series Assisen: the insuline murder and the part of Detective in British-Belgian series Patience.

== Theater ==
- 2023-2024 - Voyeur (BE, NL)
- 2023-2026 - The Ego (BE, NL)
- 2022-2025 - Well-Behaved Women Seldom Make History (BE, NL, UK)
- 2020-2022 - Work Harder - Lies Pauwels & Wunderbaum (NL, DE)
- 2019 - Pablo - Dansvitrine (BE)
- 2017 - La democrazia in America - Romeo Castellucci & Societas (BE, NL)
- 2016-2019 - Liv - De Mannschaft (BE, NL)
- 2015-2018 - De Auditie - Het Kartel (BE)
- 2013-2018 - Das Reingold & De Halve Ring - Toneelgroep Amsterdam / De warme Winkel (BE, NL, SK)
- 2013-2017 - Sirens - Ontroerend Goed (BE, NL, UK, CH)
- 2013 - De diepte van het dal - Dimitri Leue & Rataplan (BE)
- 2009-2013 - Teenage Riot - Ontroerend Goed (BE, NL, D, DK, IT, UK, A, SE, AUS)
- 2009-2010 - Once and for all we're gonna tell you who we are so shut up and listen - Ontroerend Goed (BE, NL, USA, AUS, CAN, IRL)
- 2009-2010 - Remember Me - Kopergietery (BE, NL)

== Television ==
- Patience (2024) - as Detective
- Assisen 2 (2024) - as Linda
- Hidden Assets 2 (2023) - as Stefanie Courtois
- Documentary Now! (2022) - as Beatrice Lemutte
- Two Summers (2022) - as Nora
- Undercover (season 3) (2021) - as Vicky
- Under Fire (2021) - as Liv
- Slippery Ice (2021) - as Chanelle
- VY-inc (2020) - as Rachel
- Darktown (2020) - as Punkerin
- De Kotmadam (2019) - as student
- The Flemish Bandits (2018) - as Magdaleine
- De zonen van Van As (2017) - as Marilyn
- Please, Love Me (2017) - as Saar
- Witse (2010) - as Maya

== Film ==
- The Pod Generation (2023) - as Radical Feminist
- Cold Light (2020) - as Lore
- Love Paranoid (short) (2019) - as Laura
- La vida era eso (2019) - as Marie Anne
- The spy (2019) - as make-up girl
- Domino (2019) - as secretary Wold
- Out of the blue into the black (short) (2017) - as Polly
- Rattrapage (2017) - as Hilde
- De linde vertelt (2016) - as Katrijn
- The Exception (2016) - as Wehrmacht secretary
- A Quiet Passion (2016) as Margaret Kelley
