= The Kaiser's Last Kiss =

2003 novel by Alan Judd

- First edition
- Author: Alan Judd
- Language: English
- Publisher: HarperCollins
- Publication date: 2003
- Publication place: United Kingdom
- Pages: 208 pp
- ISBN: 978-0-00-712447-3

The Kaiser's Last Kiss is a 2003 novel written by Alan Judd. The story gives a fictional account of the last few days in the life of exiled Kaiser Wilhelm II after his home at Doorn, Netherlands is taken over by the invading Germans during the opening months of the Second World War. The book was published by Harper Perennial. In October 2015, filming started for the adaptation of the book starring Lily James and Jai Courtney.

== Plot summary ==
The story is set in 1940 and concerns Untersturmführer Martin Krebbs, a young and recently commissioned SS officer who has been sent to Huis Doorn to guard the exiled Kaiser Wilhelm II as the German Army advances into the Netherlands. While there, Krebbs meets and falls for Akki, an undercover British agent posing as a maid, who has been sent by the British Secret Service on the orders of Winston Churchill to assess the Kaiser's feelings about the war and his possible willingness to defect to Britain.

As the story unfolds, and through conversations Krebbs has with both the Kaiser and Akki (who Krebbs discovers is Jewish), and a visit from Heinrich Himmler, Krebbs begins to discover some uncomfortable truths about the Nazis, forcing him to question the things he has been taught. When Akki's true identity is in danger of being exposed, Krebbs must choose between his duty to the Third Reich and his feelings for the woman he loves.

== Historical context ==
The story imagines a slightly altered timeline of events surrounding the German occupation of the Netherlands, most notably the time between the German invasion of the Netherlands, which occurred in 1940, and the death of the Kaiser and the German invasion of Russia, both of which took place in 1941. As described in the story a detachment of Wehrmacht troops under the command of an SS officer was sent to guard Wilhelm II, but Krebbs is an imagined character. Churchill offered the Kaiser asylum in the United Kingdom, but the invitation was conveyed to him in different circumstances from those described in the book. Heinrich Himmler did not visit the Kaiser at Huis Doorn, but Hermann Göring did. An incident in the book during which Wilhelm's wife Princess Hermine gives Himmler an envelope of money is based on a similar incident involving Goering. The novel also makes reference to an assassination attempt against Hanns Albin Rauter, the head of the SS in the Netherlands, the Le Paradis massacre, and deals with Krebbs' discomfort on hearing Himmler discussing his preferred method for exterminating Jewish children.

== Adaptation ==
The novel was adapted into the movie The Exception in 2016.

== Main characters ==
- Untersturmführer Martin Krebbs - an SS Officer sent to guard the Kaiser
- Kaiser Wilhelm II - the exiled former German Emperor
- Akki - a British Secret Service agent sent to assess the Kaiser's feelings about the war and his willingness to defect to the United Kingdom, posing as a maid from Friesland.
- Princess Hermine - the second wife of Wilhelm II
- Heinrich Himmler - the Reichsführer of the SS
- Captain von Ilsemann - Wilhelm's personal aide
