= Clive Brunt =

English actor (born 1972)

Clive Charles Arthur Brunt (born 27 January 1972, Oldbury, West Midlands), is an English actor.

Brunt is the eldest of 2 sons. From an early age, he demonstrated an aptitude for acting. As a youth he was affiliated to the Oldbury Rep theatre and at the age of 16 attained a place at the National Youth Theatre, where his contemporaries were Daniel Craig and Matt Lucas. He became a professional actor in 1993.

Notable performances are in BAFTA-winning Dunkirk as Pvt. Alf Tombs (2004), Daniel Kramer's Woyzeck at The Gate theatre as The Sergeant (2005) and later reprising the role at St Ann's Warehouse, (New York, 2006) with Edward Hogg, David Harewood and Roger Evans.

He has worked on British TV, including appearing in popular soaps (The Bill, Doctors and Coronation Street).

Brunt stars in the feature film Snow in Paradise, which premiered at the Cannes Film Festival in the Un certain regard category in 2014.

The Legend of Tarzan, starring Alexander Skarsgård and Samuel L. Jackson, was released in 2016. The Limehouse Golem, in which he also appeared, was released later that year.

Londongrad (2008) a Russian short film drama addressing the rise of the oligarch and based on the book of the same name was released in both Russia and the United Kingdom.

Dumbo, directed by Tim Burton, Trust for FX Network in the US and Summer of Rockets directed by Stephen Poliakoff for the BBC were released in 2019. Safe Space and work for HBO due for release.

Brunt lives in the West Midlands with his wife Louise, and their family. He is represented by Winterson's
