= Bobby Henline =

American stand-up comedian and former soldier

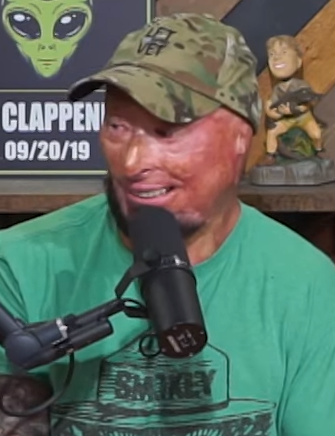
- Henline in 2020
- Born: Robert Henline; September 3, 1971 (age 55)
- Spouse(s): Connie Strout (divorced); Jamie Neely Henline
- Children: 5
- Political party: Republican

Comedy career
- Years active: 2009–present
- Medium: Stand-up, motivational speaker
- Genres: Observational comedy, blue comedy
- Subjects: Military, everyday life, self-deprecation
- Military career
- Allegiance: United States
- Branch: United States Army
- Service years: 1989–1992, 2001–2011
- Rank: SSG
- Conflicts: Gulf War; Iraq War (WIA)
- Awards: Purple Heart
- Website: bobbyhenlinecomedy.com

Robert "Bobby" Henline (born September 3, 1971) is an American stand-up comedian, motivational speaker, and former U.S. Army soldier. He began his career in comedy in 2009 when he performed at an open mic night at the Comedy Store in Los Angeles. He has since gone on to perform comedy and give motivational talks internationally and has featured in several movies and documentaries.

== Career ==
=== Military career ===
Henline enlisted in the United States Army in 1989 at 17 years of age. After completing basic training, he served in the Gulf War and was Honorably Discharged from service in 1992. Following the September 11 attacks of 2001, Henline re-enlisted into the Army and served three additional tours during the Iraq War. On his fourth tour he was part of the 82nd Airborne Division and during a convoy transporting soldiers and supplies the Humvee Henline was riding in hit an IED. The four other soldiers with whom he was riding were all killed while Henline was set ablaze in the explosion and suffered severe burns on almost 40 percent of his body with his head and face being burned down to the skull. Henline was put into a medically induced coma and transported to Brooke Army Medical Center in San Antonio, Texas. He awakened after two weeks, and underwent six months of treatment. Currently, Henline has undergone 48 surgeries including multiple skin grafts and reconstructions.

=== Comedy career ===
While hospitalized Henline would often use humor as a means of dealing with his extraordinary circumstances. As his treatment was ending, his occupational therapist suggested that he attend an open mic at the Comedy Store. In August 2009, Henline made his debut and from there he did open mics three times a week. He was contacted by a talent agency in L.A. which led him to a part in the Showtime documentary "Comedy Warriors: Healing Through Humor". He went on to perform at events and comedy clubs across the nation including such venues as Brad Garrett's Comedy Club; Hollywood Improv; Laugh Factory; Krackpots; L.A. Comedy Club; Stardome; LOL San Antonio; LA Comedy Club (Laughlin, NV) and more.

=== Motivational speaking ===
After his recovery Henline started traveling and speaking to a wide range of audiences, including injured veterans and burn victims. He helped found the Bravo748 Military and Law Enforcement Speakers Bureau and travels around the world with the organization to do speaking engagements. Henline and his wife Jamie started the charity organization Forging Forward, The Bobby Henline Foundation with the goal of helping military personnel and first-responders and their families deal with the injuries and trauma that can occur in that work.

== Filmography ==
=== Film ===
Year	Title	Role	Notes
2011	Samsara	Himself	Documentary; as Robert Henline
2013	Healing Bobby	Himself	Film
2013	Comedy Warriors: Healing Through Humor	Himself	Documentary
2013	Captivating Not Captive	Himself	Short
2016	Sophie and the Rising Sun	John Jeffers	Drama
2017	Surviving Home	Himself	
2019	MBF: Man's Best Friend	Marine Corps Gunnery Sgt. Harold Reeves	As Robert Henline

=== Television ===
Year	Title	Role	Notes
2018	Shameless	Pyro Paulie	Episode: "Sleepwalking"
2019	Larry Charles' Dangerous World of Comedy	Himself	Episode: "Part 2: War - The Soldiers"

== Awards and nominations ==
Year	Award	Category	Work	Result	Ref(s)
2017	VFW Hall of Fame Awards				
