= Mike Lynch (information scientist) =

Michael Felix Lynch MBCS (born February 1932) is a Professor Emeritus in the Information School of the University of Sheffield, England, his main research having been in chemoinformatics. Lynch obtained B.Sc. and Ph.D. degrees in chemistry from University College, Dublin in 1954 and 1957. Following two years in industry in the UK, he joined the staff of Chemical Abstracts Service (CAS) in Columbus, Ohio in the US, in 1961.

Lynch returned to the UK in 1965 and was a teacher and researcher at Sheffield in the Postgraduate School of Librarianship and Information Science, later the Department of Information Studies and now the Information School, from 1965 until 1995. His research interests centred on the characterization of data structures implicit in records of information, both in relation to databases of text and of chemical structures, and on applying these data structures for the development of algorithms which might then lead to useful applications. Among the applications resulting from his work are text compression, as well as methods for searching databases of chemical substances for substructures, the identification of changes due to chemical reactions, and the design of improved chemical patent information systems. Much of the research was funded by the information industry, and has been influential in the design of present-day systems. He produced more than 140 research publications and several textbooks.

In 1989, Lynch was awarded the Skolnik Award of the American Chemical Society. This award was given "for pioneering research of more than two decades on the development of methods for the storage, manipulation, and retrieval of chemical structures and reactions as well as related bibliographic information, including generic structure storage and retrieval, automatic subject indexing, articulated subject index production, document retrieval system, and database management." Lynch was Honorary President of the Chemical Structure Association, which awards the triennial CSA Trust Mike Lynch Award in his honour.

In 1999 the University of Sheffield Information School opened the Michael Lynch Research Lab, named in his honour, and used as a base for the Chemoinformatics and Health Informatics research groups. It was refurbished in 2014.

Lynch died on 15 November 2024 in Calgary, Canada. He was survived by his second wife Mary, his daughter Catherine and son Kevin, and his stepsons Mark and Jeffrey Dykstra.
