= Peter Willett =

British chemoinformatics researcher

- Born: 20 April 1953 (age 73)
- Education: Exeter College, Oxford
- Known for: Cheminformatics
- Scientific career
- Fields: Information Science, Chemistry
- Workplaces: University of Sheffield

Peter Willett is an emeritus professor of information science at the University of Sheffield, England.

== Life and education ==
Willett was born 20 April 1953, obtained an Honors degree in Chemistry from Exeter College, Oxford in 1975 and then went to the Department of Information Studies, University of Sheffield where he obtained an MSc in Information Studies in 1976. He obtained a PhD in the same department in 1979.

== Career ==
His entire career has been in the Information School, where he heads a research group studying computational techniques for the processing of chemical and biological information, and has over 480 publications describing this work. Measured in 2020, he had an h-index of 86.

== Work ==
Willett is best known for his contribution to information retrieval and cheminformatics.

== Honours ==
He was the recipient of the 1993 Herman Skolnik Award of the American Chemical Society, of the 1997 Distinguished Lecturer Award of the New Jersey Chapter of the American Society for Information Science, of the 2001 Tony Kent Strix award of the Institute of Information Scientists, of the 2002 Lynch Award of the Chemical Structure Association Trust and of the 2005 Award for Computers in Chemical and Pharmaceutical Research of the American Chemical Society (ACS) Willett was only the 2nd non-US recipient of the ACS award, which was given "for his diverse contributions to the fields of chemoinformatics and computer-assisted molecular discovery; his novel algorithms and software; and his contributions to the literatures of those fields". He was awarded a DSc by the University of Sheffield in 1997.
