= Tango (novel) =

1989 novel by Alan Judd

- First US edition
- Author: Alan Judd
- Language: English
- Publisher: Hutchinson (UK, May 1989); Summit (US, Aug 1990)
- Publication date: May 1989
- Publication place: United Kingdom
- Media type: Print
- Pages: 290
- ISBN: 0-09-173755-9

Tango is a novel by English author Alan Judd published in 1989 by Hutchinson. Quentin Letts writing in The Daily Telegraph described it as "his funniest novel to date".

== Plot Introduction ==
The novel tells the story of William Wooding, the overweight 35-year old manager of an English bookshop in the capital of an unnamed South American country. He realizes that Carlos, the newly installed president is an old school friend and soon after is approached by the mysterious Mr Box who recruits him for the now privatized British Intelligence Agency who plan to engineer the overthrow of the government with the assistance of Williams influence with the president. Love interest is provided by Theresa a beautiful prostitute who frequents Maria's Tango club and with whom William falls in love. But Theresa is seeking a better life for herself and has caught the eye of the president.

== Reception ==
The rear jacket of the 1993 Flamingo paperback edition presents the following quotes:

- "Very entertaining... it makes you want to turn the pages. No mean achievement", William Henry Holmes, Sunday Telegraph
- "Well-constructed, witty and at times moving", Ian Thompson, The Independent
- "An enjoyable book which made me laugh out loud... Alan Judd has a real gift for satire.", Martyn Harris, New Statesman
- "The Breezy satirical blend of carnival and cruelty is never less than nicely judged", Valentine Cunningham, The Observer
