= Soundproof (film) =

- Genre: Thriller
- Written by: Sukey Fisher
- Directed by: Edmund Coulthard
- Starring: Susan Lynch; Joseph Mawle; Joanna Dunbar; Brendan Coyle; Neil Stuke; Michael Colgan; Eve Myles
- Composers: Mark Richter; Max Richter
- Country of origin: United Kingdom
- Original languages: English; BSL
- No. of episodes: 1

Production
- Executive producers: Robin Gutch; Hilary Salmon
- Producer: Madonna Baptiste
- Cinematography: Peter Greenhalgh
- Editor: William Diver
- Running time: 90 minutes
- Production company: Blast! Films

Original release
- Network: BBC2
- Release: 12 July 2006

Soundproof is a single British television drama film, written by Sukey Fisher (under the pseudonym of Joe Fisher), that first broadcast on BBC2 on 12 July 2006. Directed by Edmund Coulthard, the film starred Joseph Mawle as Dean Whittingham, a profoundly deaf man accused of murder, and Susan Lynch as Penny, his sign-language interpreter. The film was commissioned in September 2005. The BBC listing describes the film as "a gripping urban thriller that breaks new ground in bringing deaf and hearing actors together." As such, the film was conducted partly in sign-language and subtitles.

Director Edmund Coulthard said of the production: "I wanted to create a rollercoaster thriller that takes the viewer into the experience of being deaf in a very different way. In trying to work out whether the lead deaf character is innocent or guilty, the viewer has to experience Dean's world through his eyes." The score for the film was composed by Mark and Max Richter. Soundproof won a BAFTA TV Award for best director in 2007, and was also nominated for an RTS Television Award for Best Female Actor for Susan Lynch and Breakthrough for Joseph Mawle.

== Plot ==
Chris (Neil Stuke) is thrown off the balcony of a high rise block of flats – and it looks like murder. Suspicion falls on his flatmate Dean (Joseph Mawle) who is profoundly deaf. Penny (Susan Lynch) is the sign language interpreter brought in to help the police question him. But when Penny bumps into Dean later in a nearby pub, they embark on a secret affair which makes Penny's impartiality as police interpreter harder and harder to sustain. Dean needs Penny to prove his innocence, but as the police investigation continues, Penny starts to wonder if he is in fact the murderer after all.

== Cast ==
- Susan Lynch as Penny
- Joseph Mawle as Dean Whittingham
- Joanna Dunbar as Jak
- Brendan Coyle as DI Dave Cox
- Neil Stuke as Chris Groves
- Michael Colgan as Connor
- Eve Myles as DC Sarah McGowan
- Demelza Randall as Magda
- Diana Martin as Heather
- Jay Simpson as DS Rollins
- Guy Lankester as Jamie
- Susannah Wise as Anna
- Josef Altin as Stee
