= Dive (TV series) =

British television drama

Dive is a two-part British television drama, written and directed by Dominic Savage and starring Jack O'Connell, Aisling Loftus and Gina McKee. Broadcast on BBC Two in July 2010, the show dealt with the problems of teenage relationships and pregnancy against the backdrop of a young diver's preparations for the 2012 Summer Olympics.

== Critical reception ==
The Independent's reviewer called Dive "a pitch-perfect depiction of young, modern, British puppy love." The Daily Telegraph said it was "a rather beautiful and moving piece of television. Writer/director Dominic Savage... has made a fine, truthful film, several cuts above your average telly drama", a "profoundly engaging" love story with "superb performances" by Jack O’Connell and Aisling Loftus.

The Observer felt the "intensely memorable film was slow-build, like a dive itself. You had long, graceful shots of wind-farms and playgrounds and parks and naughty smokers, of modern life in a seaside town, with some beautiful music to let you think, to wonder what was going to happen.... And then, in the film as in the pool, the explosion, and the splash." Jack O’Connell's performance was "mesmerising, comedic, soulful" and Aisling Loftus "is going to be a phenomenon."
