= Legacy (Judd novel) =

2001 novel by Alan Judd

- First edition
- Author: Alan Judd
- Language: English
- Publisher: HarperCollins
- Publication date: Sep 2001
- Publication place: United Kingdom
- Media type: Print
- Pages: 320
- ISBN: 0-002-25940-0
- Preceded by: A Breed of Heroes
- Followed by: Uncommon Enemy

Set in 1970s London, Legacy is a spy novel by English author Alan Judd. Published in 2001 it continues the story of Charles Thoroughgood, first introduced in his debut novel, A Breed of Heroes, published 20 years earlier. British historian Peter Hennessy described it as 'one of the best spy novels ever'.

== Plot Introduction ==
Living in Queensway, London, Charles Thoroughgood has now left the Army and has enrolled with MI6. While he is undergoing basic training in espionage techniques he is asked to make contact with Victor Koslov, whom he knew briefly at Oxford University before he joined the Army. Victor is now a liaison officer attached to the Soviet Embassy and has been spotted visiting a prostitute. Thoroughgood arranges a "chance" meeting, but Victor tells him that Thoroughgood's father (now dead) was a Soviet spy. Thoroughgood reports back to his mentors, who confirm that it may be true. They also suspect that his father may have been involved in Operation Legacy, the creation of a network of secret caches hidden by the KGB in strategic locations in western countries. Thoroughgood manages to locate one such cache near his childhood home in Beaconsfield. At the conclusion of the book another cache is found in Southwold, near the Sizewell nuclear power stations.

== Reception ==
- Kirkus Reviews is positive, "a twisty, accomplished, and engaging Cold War thriller", finishing with "The conclusion plays out a bit too neatly, but, still: savory, cozy, nicely textured, and very British"
- The Daily Telegraph agrees, "Employing a number of intricate and entertaining twists, Legacy takes us back to John le Carré and the golden age of spy novels. This is a secret service run by avuncular civil servants who commute from Kent and Surrey, spend the weekends digging their gardens, and, in the sleepy and indirect manner of well-clubbed gentlemen, play brilliant endgames that protect us against enemies without and within".
- Joanne Ahern writing for RTÉ.ie says: "Although award-winning author Alan Judd spins a wholly believable and interesting tale the book is terribly slow-moving in places and Thoroughgood, like his name, is not a very exciting character. However, the book is redeemed by its surprise ending."

== Publication history ==
- 2001, UK, HarperCollins, ISBN 0-00-225940-0, Pub date 17 Sep 2001, Hardback
- 2002, UK, Isis, ISBN 0-7531-1496-8, Pub date Jun 2002, Audio Cassette
- 2002, UK, HarperCollins, ISBN 0-00-651356-5, Pub date 21 Oct 2002, Paperback
- 2003, US, Knopf, ISBN 0-375-41484-3, Pub date 08 Apr 2003, Hardback
- 2004, US, Vintage, ISBN 1-4000-3081-1, Pub date Nov 2004, Paperback
- 2009, UK, Harpercollins, ISBN 0-00-733030-8, Pub date 01 Jul 2009, Paperback
- 2012, UK, Simon & Schuster, ISBN 1-84739-773-5, Pub date 05 Jan 2012, Paperback

== Television adaptation ==
The novel was adapted for television by the BBC in 2013.
