= Hatoon Kadi =

Saudi Arabian comedian and activist

- هتون قاضي
- Occupations: Comedian, Activist
- Website: www.youtube.com/user/NoonAlniswa, twitter.com/HatoonKadi

Hatoon Kadi (Arabic: هتون قاضي) is a Saudi Arabian comedian and activist who hosts the Noon Al Niswa comedy show on YouTube, which has 292,912 subscribers (as of 8 December 2016). She presents social phenomena from a woman's perspective, using sarcasm, avoiding judgment and without trying to find solutions. She is known for her satiric videos about women's and family issues, often highlighting everyday life in Saudi Arabia. Dr. Hatoon Kadi started with comedy when she realized that there were plenty of Saudi Arabian internet comedians, but a lack women in the field. In 2014, she was named one of the BBC's 100 Women.

Kadi is the mother of two, and writes a weekly column for Arab News, an English language Saudi Arabian daily newspaper. She lectures part-time at Dar Al-Hekma University, School of Business and Law, in Jeddah, Saudi Arabia. Kadi completed two degrees in the United Kingdom. In 2009, she graduated with MSc Information Technology, Management and Organization, from Lancaster University. In 2016, she achieved her PhD at University of Sheffield.

In December 2016, Kadi was among a group of social media influencers in the Persian Gulf region who launched a campaign in support of Syrian refugees in Jordan. Their aim was to raise awareness about the challenges of Syrian refugees in Jordan and to mobilise financial support. The influencers published written and filmed stories about their visits to Syrian refugee camps, bringing attention to refugee suffering.
