= CSA Trust =

The Chemical Structure Association Trust (CSA Trust) is an internationally recognized, registered charity which promotes education, research and development in the field of storage, processing and retrieval of information about chemical structures, reactions and compounds. Since 2003 it has incorporated the activities of the former Chemical Structure Association.

The Trust produces a Newsletter three times a year, and organizes conferences and training in cooperation with other organizations. It also provides a forum for advice and discussion on chemoinformatics. A Board of Trustees manage the Trust.

The trust jointly organizes several conferences (including the International Conference on Chemical Structures and the Sheffield Conference on Chemoinformatics, each held every three years). It has been designated a Scholarly Society, and has been highlighted in various publications.

== Awards and grants ==
The CSA Trust Mike Lynch Award, named in honour of Professor Mike Lynch, is given on a triennial basis. It consists of five thousand US dollars ($5,000) and an appropriate memento. The purpose of the Award is to recognize and encourage outstanding accomplishments in education, research and development activities that are related to the systems and methods used to store, process and retrieve information about chemical structures, reactions and properties. The 2011 award was made at the 9th International Conference on Chemical Structures (Noorwijkerhout, The Netherlands, 5–9 June 2011).

The Trust makes annual Jacques-Émile Dubois Grants, which provide funding for the career development of young researchers (age 35 or younger) who have demonstrated excellence in the areas listed above. The value of each Grant may vary, with no Grant exceeding one thousand US dollars ($1,000). Grants are awarded for specific purposes, and each recipient of a Grant is required to submit a brief written report detailing how the Grant funds were allocated.

Additionally, Bursaries may be made available at the discretion of the Trust. Bursaries, which are also for specific purposes, are age-neutral and requests follow the same procedure as that for the Grant applications and will be evaluated against the same criteria. The awarding of Bursaries in any given year will be determined by the availability of funds.

== See also ==
- Cheminformatics
