= Dominic Savage =

British director, writer and actor

- Born: ND; Margate, Kent, England
- Occupations: Director; writer; actor
- Writing career
- Notable works: Nice Girl; When I Was 12; Freefall
- Notable awards: BAFTA

Dominic Savage is a British BAFTA award-winning director, writer and actor.

Originally a child actor, he made several television appearances and had a role in Stanley Kubrick's Barry Lyndon (1975). Savage moved into screenwriting and directing in his mid-thirties, and won BAFTAs for Nice Girl (2000) and When I Was 12 (2001). He later directed the 2009 film Freefall.

== Filmography ==
=== As director ===
- Nice Girl (TV film) (2000)
- When I Was 12 (TV film) (2001)
- Out of Control (TV film) (2002)
- Love + Hate (2005)
- Born Equal (TV film) (2006)
- Freefall (TV film) (2009)
- Dive (TV miniseries) (2010)
- True Love (TV series) (2012)
- The Secrets (TV series) (2014)
- The Escape (2017)
- I Am... (2019-2026)
- Close to You (2023)

=== As actor ===
- Barry Lyndon (1975) - Young Bullingdon
- The Devil's Crown (1978) - Young Henry
- The Mystery of the Disappearing Schoolgirls (1980) - Quartus
