= Chartered Institute of Library and Information Professionals =

Professional body in the United Kingdom

CILIP
- Established: 2002 (24 years ago); 1958 (Institute of Information Scientists); 1877 (Library Association)
- President: Sue Lacey Bryant
- Chief Executive: Sam Harris (interim CEO)
- Staff: 47
- Budget: ▲£4.0 million
- Members: 9,337 (as of 2019)
- Location: London, WC1
- Website: www.cilip.org.uk

The Chartered Institute of Library and Information Professionals (CILIP, pronounced /ˈsɪlɪp/ SIL-ip) is a professional body for librarians, information specialists and knowledge managers in the United Kingdom.

It was established in 2002 as a merger of the Library Association (LA, sometimes LAUK) and the Institute of Information Scientists (IIS).

CILIP in Scotland (CILIPS) is an independent organisation which operates in Scotland in affiliation with CILIP and delivers services via a service level agreement.

CILIP's 2020 goal is to "put information and library skills and professional values at the heart of a democratic, equal and prosperous society".

== History ==
CILIP was formed in 2002 by the merger of the Library Association (abbreviated as LA or sometimes LAUK) – founded in 1877 as a result of the first International Conference of Librarians and awarded a Royal Charter in 1898 – and the Institute of Information Scientists (IIS), founded on 23 January 1958.

The first President of the Library Association had been John Winter Jones and other notable Presidents had included Richard Garnett (1893), Frederic G. Kenyon (1910), W. C. Berwick Sayers (1938), Lionel McColvin (1952) and Douglas John Foskett (1976). The jubilee (50th year) of the Association was celebrated in 1927. Library associations from fourteen European countries and the United States signed a resolution at the celebration of the 50th anniversary of the Library Association of the United Kingdom held in Edinburgh which brought the International Federation of Library Associations into existence.

The Library Association offered professional recognition at the level of Associate of the Library Association (ALA), the basic professional qualification, and Fellow of the Library Association (FLA), awarded for a higher level of professional achievement.

Membership of the CILIP on unification in 2002 was estimated at 23,000. Sheila Corrall was the first President of CILIP, succeeded in 2003 by Margaret Watson.

In 2017, the Chartered Institute of Library and Information Professionals was rebranded to CILIP: The library and information association.

== Description ==
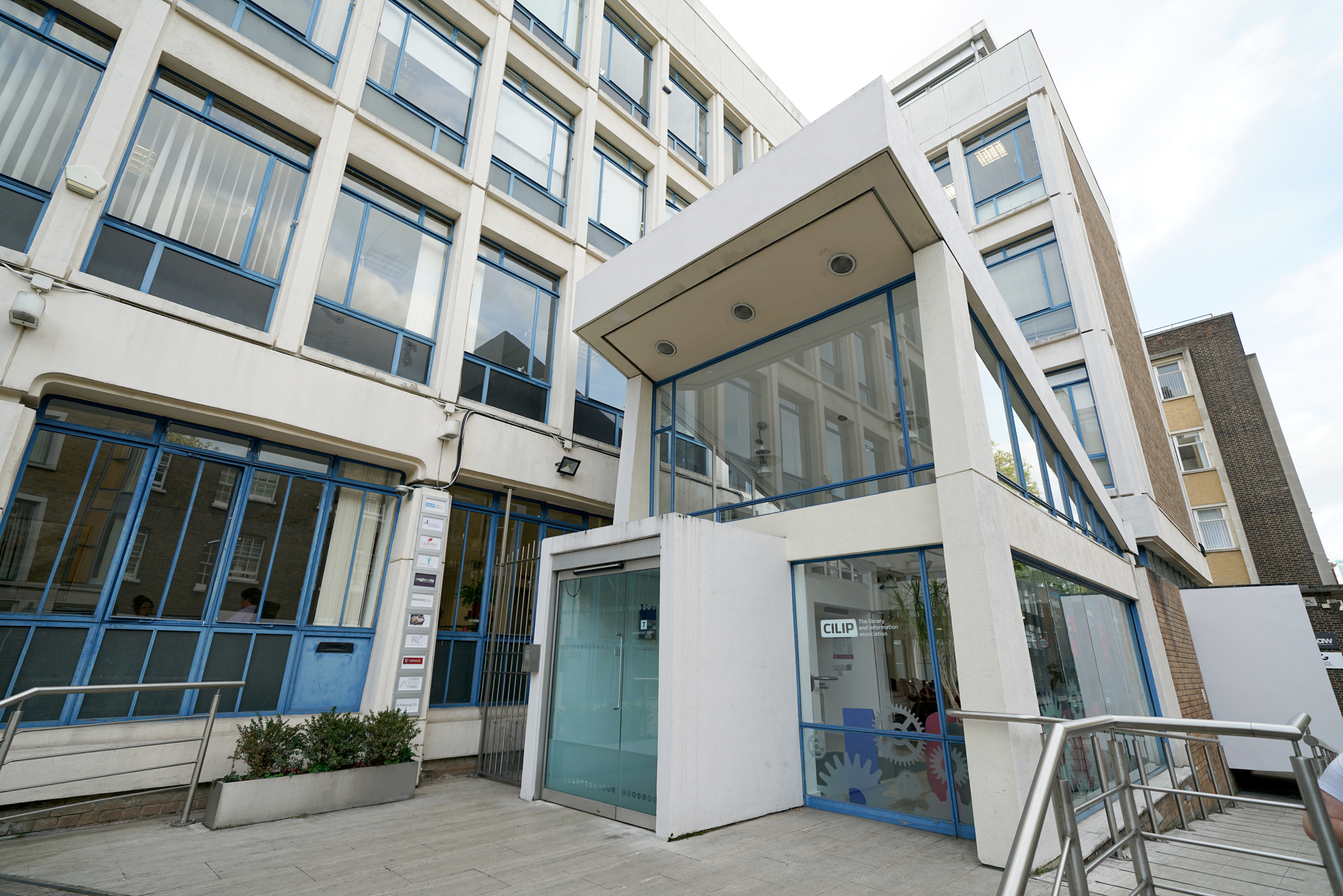
Former CILIP headquarters in Ridgmount Street, London

CILIP has its headquarters in the British Library in London. Until 2023, CILIP had been based at number 7 Ridgmount Street, in the building purpose-built in 1965 as the headquarters of the Library Association.

CILIP is a registered charity.

== Activities ==
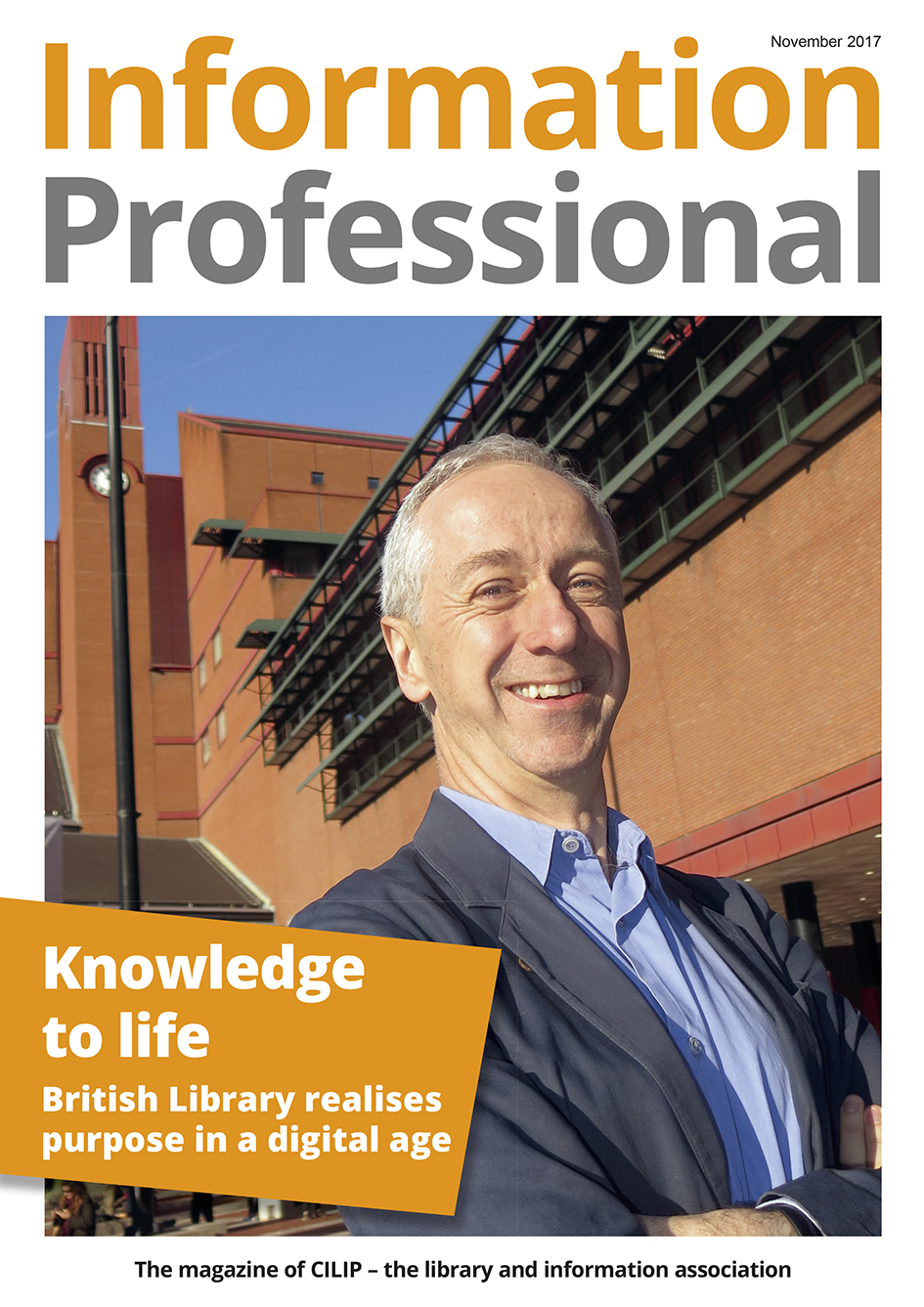
The cover of the first issue of Information Professional magazine (November 2017) showing Roly Keating of the British Library

CILIP launched a monthly journal, Information Professional in 2017, providing news, interviews, and analysis. This publication succeeded Library & Information Update which was published from 2002 to 2017 and the Library Association Record published from 1899 to 2002. CILIP publications also include Lisjobnet (a recruitment website), and Facet Publishing (professional books).

CILIP hosts an annual conference for members and non-members. Past keynote speakers include Dr Carla Hayden (Librarian of Congress in the US), Professor Luciano Floridi and Sir Nigel Shadbolt.

CILIP does little to raise the profile of the work of librarians and information professionals through campaigns, public affairs activity, and awards and medals, as well as promoting best practice. Campaigns have included My Library By Right (publicising local government's statutory obligation to provide library services), Facts Matter (championing the value of quality information during the 2017 UK General Election), and the annual Libraries Week campaign and Libraries Change Lives Award.

CILIP awards the Carnegie Medal for Writing and Carnegie Medal for Illustration for children's books. CILIP works in partnership to award the Amnesty CILIP Honour, a special commendation which is part of the Carnegie and Kate Greenaway Medals. Special interest groups also make their own awards, such as the Jason Farradane Award and Tony Kent Strix Award of UKeiG.

There are over 20 special interest groups for members working with, for instance, rare books and prison libraries and a similar number of 'organisations in liaison' with CILIP, such as Information for Social Change, the National Acquisitions Group, and the Society of Indexers. CILIP, in its previous incarnation as the Library Association, was a founder member of the International Federation of Library Associations and Institutions (IFLA) in 1927.

Some specialist groups organise conferences such as the annual LILAC (Librarians' Information Literacy Conference), held since 2005 by the CILIP's Information Literacy Group, or the Health Libraries Group conference, held every two years.

CILIP's archives are held by University College London Special Collections, having been deposited with the institution between 2002 and 2007.

== Professional development ==
CILIP accredits degree courses in library and information science at universities in the UK, as well as a number of overseas programmes in China, Germany, Hong Kong, Kuwait, Oman, Thailand and Qatar.

There are three levels of professional registration with corresponding postnominal letters:

- Certified Affiliate (ACLIP), suitable for paraprofessionals without an accredited qualification
- Chartered Member (MCLIP)
- Chartered Fellow (FCLIP)

Honorary Fellowship (HonFCLIP), akin to an honorary degree, is granted to a small number of people who have rendered distinguished service to the profession. CILIP provides opportunities for continuing professional development and a self-assessment tool, the Professional Knowledge and Skills Base. Registered members may revalidate their registration annually.

Membership of CILIP is not compulsory for practice.

== Membership ==
The following information on CILIP membership is taken from CILIP Council reports with the exceptions of the estimates for 2002, 2003 and 2005. Membership numbers for 2004 and 2006 are not available.

	2002	2003	2004	2005	2006	2007	2008	2009	2010	2011	2012	2013	2014	2015	2016	2017	2018	2019	2020	2021
Number of members	≈23,000	22,689	—N/a	(20,373)	—N/a	19,206	18,490	17,634	17,192	15,705	14,555	13,974	13,567	13,163	12,632	11,868	9,793	9,337	9,749	8,758

The method of calculation was changed in 2018 to count 'Life Members' as a separate category in published membership statistics and hence these figures do not represent a continuous series. As at January 2019 there were approximately 1,000 'Life Members' of CILIP.

== CILIP in Scotland ==
CILIPS
- Established: 1908 (118 years ago)
- President: Martina McChrystal
- Head: Sean McNamara
- Staff: 2
- Budget: £22,000
- Members: 1,200 (as of 2019)
- Location: Glasgow, United Kingdom
- Website: www.cilips.org.uk

The Chartered Institute of Library and Information Professionals in Scotland (CILIP in Scotland, or CILIPS) is a charitable incorporated organisation affiliated to CILIP. All CILIP members working or living in Scotland are automatically members of CILIPS. Policy, finances, operational matters and advocacy are devolved to CILIPS Trustee Board and staff and CILIP services are delivered via a service level agreement. CILIPS works with the Scottish Library and Information Council (SLIC), the advisory body for the Scottish Government on library and information matters.

CILIP in Scotland was originally established as the Scottish Library Association in 1908 and affiliated with the Library Association in 1931. When CILIP was established in 2002, the Scottish Library Association voted to change its name to CILIPS. CILIPS published a professional journal, Information Scotland (ISSN 1479-8441), between 2003 and 2009, which subsequently became a newsletter.
