= Alan Judd =

English military analyst and writer (born 1946, a.k.a., Alan Edwin Petty)

Alan Judd FRSL
- Born: Alan Edwin Petty; 1946 (age 79–80)
- Military career
- Allegiance: United Kingdom
- Other work: Diplomat, security analyst, and writer

Alan Judd (born 1946) is a pseudonym used by Alan Edwin Petty. Born in 1946, he is a former soldier and diplomat who now works as a security analyst and writer in the United Kingdom. He writes both books and articles, regularly contributing to a number of publications, including The Daily Telegraph, the Spectator and The Oldie. His books include both fiction and non-fiction titles, with his novels often drawing on his military background.

== Fiction Titles ==
Charles Thoroughgood novels:

- A Breed of Heroes (1981 – adapted by Charles Wood as a BBC television film in 1996)
- Legacy (2001)
- Uncommon Enemy (2012)
- Inside Enemy (2014)
- Deep Blue (2017)
- Accidental Agent (2019)
- Queen and Country (2022)

Other novels:

- Short of Glory (1984)
- The Noonday Devil (1987)
- Tango (1989)
- The Devil's Own Work (1991)
- The Kaiser's Last Kiss (2003)
- Dancing with Eva (2006)
- Slipstream (2015)
- Shakespeare's Sword (2018)
- A Fine Madness (2021)

== Non fiction Titles ==
- Ford Madox Ford (1990)
- First World War Poets (Character Sketches) (1997)
- The Quest for C: Mansfield Cumming And the Founding of the Secret Service (1999)

== Awards and honours ==
- A Breed of Heroes won the 1981 Winifred Holtby Memorial Prize.
- Elected Fellow of the Royal Society of Literature, 1990.
- In 1991, he won the Guardian Fiction Award for his book The Devil's Own Work.
