= Closer to Heaven =

Closer to Heaven may refer to:

- Closer to Heaven (film), a 2009 South Korean film
- Closer to Heaven (musical), a 2001 musical by Jonathan Harvey and Pet Shop Boys
  - Closer to Heaven (original cast recording), an album of songs from the musical
- "Closer to Heaven", a song from the 1997 album The Strong One by Mila Mason
- "Closer to Heaven", a song from the 1999 album Nightlife by Pet Shop Boys
