= Akiya Henry =

British actress

- Born: London, England
- Education: Eugene O'Neill Theater Center
- Occupation: Actress
- Years active: 2001–present

Akiya Henry is a British actress. She is best known for her theatre work, winning a WhatsOnStage Award and earning a Laurence Olivier Award nomination.

== Early life and education ==
Henry was born in London. At 6 months old, she was placed in a foster home, and subsequently brought up in Weston-super-Mare, Somerset, by a British-Maltese couple named Joyce and George Dymock.

Henry joined the National Youth Music Theatre, and later earned a scholarship to study at the Eugene O'Neill Theater Center in Connecticut. She also trained with Gail Gordon, then head of dance at Bristol Old Vic Theatre School.

== Career ==
In 2001, Henry made her professional stage debut as one of Billie's Babes in the Pet Shop Boys musical Closer to Heaven at the Arts Theatre. Henry also featured as a vocalist on the original cast recording. The following year, she made her television debut with a guest appearance in an episode of the BBC medical soap opera Doctors. Henry had roles in the ensemble of Anything Goes and then in Love's Labour's Lost at the National Theatre in 2002 and 2003 respectively, and in Trevor Nunn's Skellig at the Young Vic.

In 2004, Henry made her feature film debut with a small role in De-Lovely and appeared in A Midsummer Night's Dream in Chichester in 2004 as Hermia, a role she would reprise on tour in 2013. She played the Zebra in the musical Just So, also in Chichester, and featured on the cast recording, originated the role of Toby in Helen Edmundson's 2005 play Coram Boy at the National Theatre, and appeared in the comedy film Unhitched. This was followed by role in Coriolanus and Under the Black Flag at Shakespeare's Globe in 2006.

Henry appeared in every episode of the 2008 CITV series Captain Mack. In 2009, she played Miranda in The Tempest and Minnie Fay in the London revival of Hello, Dolly, both at Regent's Park Open Air Theatre.

Henry voiced Amma in the CBeebies series Bing from 2014 to 2019, and Jolli and Willi in the CBBC series Bottersnikes and Gumbles from 2015 to 2017. Her stage work at the time includes Deposit at the Hampstead Theatre and The Little Match Girl back at Shakespeare's Globe. She starred in Medea at Bristol Old Vic in 2018.

Also in 2018, Henry starred as Lady Macbeth opposite Mark Rowley in Kit Monkman's film adaptation of Macbeth. She would play Lady Macduff in The Tragedy of Macbeth at the Almeida Theatre in 2021. For her supporting performance in the latter, Henry won a WhatsOnStage Award and was nominated a for Laurence Olivier Award. She also starred in Giles Terera's The Meaning of Zong at Bristol Old Vic had a number of voice roles in the Disney series 101 Dalmatian Street, CITV series The Rubbish World of Dave Spud, and the Sky series Moominvalley. She went on to star in Much Ado About Nothing at the Royal Shakespeare Theatre as Beatrice and Mad House at the Ambassadors Theatre in 2022, and Phaedra at the National Theatre in 2023.

== Filmography ==
=== Film ===
| Year | Title | Role | Notes |
|---|---|---|---|
| 2004 | De-Lovely | Chorus | |
| 2005 | Unhitched | Bride | |
| 2018 | Macbeth | Lady Macbeth | |
| 2018 | Thomas & Friends: Big World! Big Adventures! | Various | Voice role |

=== Television ===
| Year | Title | Role | Notes |
|---|---|---|---|
| 2002 | Doctors | Echo Doyle | Episode: "Shattered Dreams" |
| 2005 | Casualty | Mona Rachu | 2 episodes |
| 2005 | Little Britain | Rochelle | 1 episode |
| 2007 | Law & Order: Criminal Intent | Lissa Borden | Episode: "Smile" |
| 2008 | Captain Mack | Yolanda Yummy / Rosie Raucous / Wendy Whizz | 52 episodes |
| 2009 | Noddy in Toyland | | Voice role, 5 episodes |
| 2010 | Silent Witness | Ruth Gardiner | 2 episodes |
| 2011 | Tinga Tinga Tales | Woodpecker | Voice role, episode: "Why Caterpillar is Never in a Hurry" |
| 2014–2019 | Bing | Amma | Voice role, 41 episodes |
| 2015–2017 | Bottersnikes and Gumbles | Jolli / Willi | 11 episodes |
| 2016 | Obsession: Dark Desires | Jeneane | Episode: "Beauty in the Bronx" |
| 2016 | Holby City | Blake Summerton | Episode: "Song of Self: Part Two" |
| 2018–2020 | 101 Dalmatian Street | Various | Voice role, 10 episodes |
| 2019–2024 | Moominvalley | Snorkmaiden | Voice role |
| 2019–2024 | The Rubbish World of Dave Spud | Little Sue | Voice role |
| 2020 | Shaun the Sheep: Adventures from Mossy Bottom | Stash | Voice role |
| 2020 | Hilda | Additional Voices | Voice role, 13 episodes |
| 2021 | Dodo | Kayla Madani | Voice role, 7 episodes |
| 2021 | Ninja Express | | Voice role |
| 2022 | Best & Bester | Rocky | Voice role |
| 2022–present | Colourblocks | Cyan | Voice role |
| 2022–present | Supertato | Broccoli | Voice role |
| 2024 | Death in Paradise | Oona Martin | Episode: "#13.2" |
| 2025 | Protection | DS Sue Beardsley | |

== Stage ==
| Year | Title | Role | Notes |
|---|---|---|---|
| 2001 | Closer to Heaven | Babe | Arts Theatre, London |
| 2002 | The Singing Group | | Chelsea Theatre, London |
| 2002 | Anything Goes | Ensemble | Royal National Theatre, London |
| 2003 | Love's Labour's Lost | Moth | Royal National Theatre, London |
| 2003 | Skellig | Mina | Young Vic, London |
| 2004 | A Midsummer Night's Dream | Hermia | Chichester Festival Theatre, Chichester |
| 2004 | Ain't Misbehavin | | Crucible Theatre, Sheffield |
| 2005 | Just So | Zebra | Chichester Festival Theatre, Chichester; Cast recording |
| 2005 | Coram Boy | Toby | Royal National Theatre, London |
| 2006 | Coriolanus | Valeria | Globe Theatre, London |
| 2006 | Under the Black Flag | | Globe Theatre, London |
| 2006 | The Enchanted Pig | Dot / Day | Tour |
| 2007 | Safe | Dionne | West Yorkshire Playhouse, Leeds |
| 2007 | Carmen Jones | Myrt | Southbank Centre, London |
| 2008 | Varjak Paw | Varjak Paw | Linbury Theatre, London |
| 2009 | The Tempest | Miranda | Regent's Park Open Air Theatre, London |
| 2009 | Hello, Dolly! | Minnie Fay | Regent's Park Open Air Theatre, London |
| 2010 | Swallows and Amazons | Titty Walker | Vaudeville Theatre, London |
| 2011 | Oat's Beggar's Opera | Jenny Diver | Regent's Park Open Air Theatre, London |
| 2011 | The Colored Museum | | Talawa Theatre Company, Victoria & Albert |
| 2012 | Mottled Lines | The Sparkle | Orange Tree Theatre, London |
| 2013 | A Midsummer Night's Dream | Hermia | Tour |
| 2014 | Perseverance Drive | Joylene Gillard | Bush Theatre, London |
| 2014 | The Nutcracker and the Mouse King | Marie | Unicorn Theatre, London |
| 2015 | Deposit | | Hampstead Theatre, London |
| 2015 | Sense of an Ending | Sister Alice | Theatre503, London |
| 2016 | Cake and Congo | Amba | Theatre503, London |
| 2016 | A Pacifist's Guide to War on Cancer | | UK tour |
| 2016 | The Little Match Girl | Various | Globe Theatre, London |
| 2017 | Medea | Medea / Maddy | Bristol Old Vic, Bristol |
| 2018, 2019 | The Dark | | Ovalhouse, London / Tron Theatre, Glasgow |
| 2019 | Dirty Crusty | Jeanine | Yard Theatre, London |
| 2021 | The Meaning of Zong | | Bristol Old Vic, Bristol |
| 2021 | The Tragedy of Macbeth | Lady Macduff | Almeida Theatre, London |
| 2022 | Much Ado About Nothing | Beatrice | Royal Shakespeare Theatre, Stratford-upon-Avon |
| 2022 | Mad House | Lillian | Ambassadors Theatre, London |
| 2023 | Phaedra | Omolara | Royal National Theatre, London |

== Awards and nominations ==
| Year | Award | Category | Work | Result | Ref. |
|---|---|---|---|---|---|
| 2022 | WhatsOnStage Awards | Best Supporting Actress in a Play | The Tragedy of Macbeth | Won | |
| 2022 | Laurence Olivier | Best Actress in a Supporting Role | The Tragedy of Macbeth | Nominated | |
