= Bottersnikes and Gumbles (TV series) =

2015 Australian-British TV series or program

- Genre: Comedy; Slapstick comedy; Surreal comedy; Children's television series
- Based on: Bottersnikes and Gumbles by S. A. Wakefield
- Written by: Tim Bain; Ray Boseley; Bruce Griffiths; Daniel Mansour; Jen Upton; Marcus Fleming; Dave Ingham; Matt Baker; Richard Preddy; Denise Cassar; Andrew Barnett-Jones; Ciaran Murtagh; Mark Hodkinson
- Starring: Jason Callender; Kathryn Drysdale; Akiya Henry; Richard Grieve; Jeff Rawle; Miriam Margolyes; Gem Knight
- Countries of origin: Australia; United Kingdom
- No. of series: 1
- No. of episodes: 52

Production
- Executive producers: Patrick Egerton; David Webster; Darren Price; Tom van Waveren; Edward Galton; Jason Netter
- Producer: Patrick Egerton
- Running time: 11 minutes
- Production companies: Cake Entertainment; Mighty Nice; Cheeky Little Media; Kickstart Entertainment; Seven Productions; CBBC; Netflix Studios

Original release
- Network: 7TWO; CBBC; Netflix
- Release: 18 December 2015 – 2017

Bottersnikes & Gumbles is a CGI animated children's television series which first aired on 7TWO in Australia and CBBC in the United Kingdom. The cast includes Jason Callender, Richard Grieve, Jeff Rawle, Kathryn Drysdale and Miriam Margolyes. It was released on Netflix in North America on 19 August 2016 but was re-dubbed with American accents.

== History ==
Bottersnikes & Gumbles was in development as early as 2012 by Mighty Nice and Cheeky Little Media. The TV series is based on the Australian children's book series of the same name written by S. A. Wakefield. In early 2015, the streaming video service Netflix announced it had acquired the rights to the series and it was released as 52 eleven-minute episodes. It later aired on 7TWO in Australia on 18 December 2015 until 22 January 2016 and CBBC in the UK in 2016. It is pitched at "6 to 9 year old boys and girls." Patrick Egerton, the producer and Cheeky Little Media CEO, described how the "books contain such a rich, distinctive world and made an indelible mark on my mind as a kid. With the CG tools and skills now available, we knew the timing was right to develop the property for TV and really do it justice."

According to Animation World Network (AWN) staff editor it "follows the adventures of three young Gumbles, Tink, Bounce and Willi, who love nothing better than to 'gumble' all day long. Endless battles ensue involving plenty of stealth, trickery, daring rescues and narrow escapes as the Gumbles try to outwit the Bottersnikes in every episode." The cast includes Richard Grieve, Jeff Rawle, Kathryn Drysdale and Miriam Margolyes. It was released on Netflix in North America on 19 August 2016; which was re-dubbed with American accents.

Sean O'Grady of The Independent felt the series based on Wakefield's books "are better adapted than most other exercises of this nature. Bottersnikes are superbly rendered lizardly creatures that are the bogeymen of the show, a bit like Momentum in the Labour Party; Gumbles are apparently normal, but hopelessly optimistic, like Brexiteers. The stories are short and sweet and the attention to detail is remarkable." The show received a Pulcinella Award for 'Best Kids TV Series' at the international animation festival, Cartoons on the Bay, in Venice and was nominated for 'Most Outstanding Children's program' at the 2016 Logie Awards.

== Cast ==
=== UK version ===
- Jason Callender as Tink
- Kathryn Drysdale as Bounce and Merri
- Akiya Henry as Willi and Jolli
- Richard Grieve as Toot, King Snike and Glob
- Jeff Rawle as Happi and Rock
- Miriam Margolyes as Weathersnike
- Alex Babic as Chank and Gubbo
- Gem Knight as Float and Snorg

=== US version ===
- Robbie Daymond as Tink
- Erica Lindbeck as Bounce
- Tara Sands as Willi
- Hal Dibble as Happi
- David W. Collins as Toot, Sammi and Rock
- Nile Kliewer as Merri
- Karen Strassman as Float and Jolli
- Ray Chase as King Snike
- Kyle McCarley as Chank
- Barbara Goodson as Weathersnike
- Kyle Hebert as Gubbo
- Keith Silverstein as Smiggles
- Jessica Gee as Glob
- Laila Berzins as Snorg
- Kaiji Tang as Burples and Angry Strawberry

== Production ==
The series was announced on 24 February 2015, when British production & distribution company Cake Entertainment joined forces with Australian animation production studios Cheeky Little Media and Mighty Nice to produce an animated television series entitled Bottersnikes & Grumbles with British children's network CBBC and Seven Network commissioned as broadcasters whilst Cake Entertainment would distribute the series internationally.
