= Giles Terera =

British actor, musician, and filmmaker (born 1976)

Giles Terera MBE
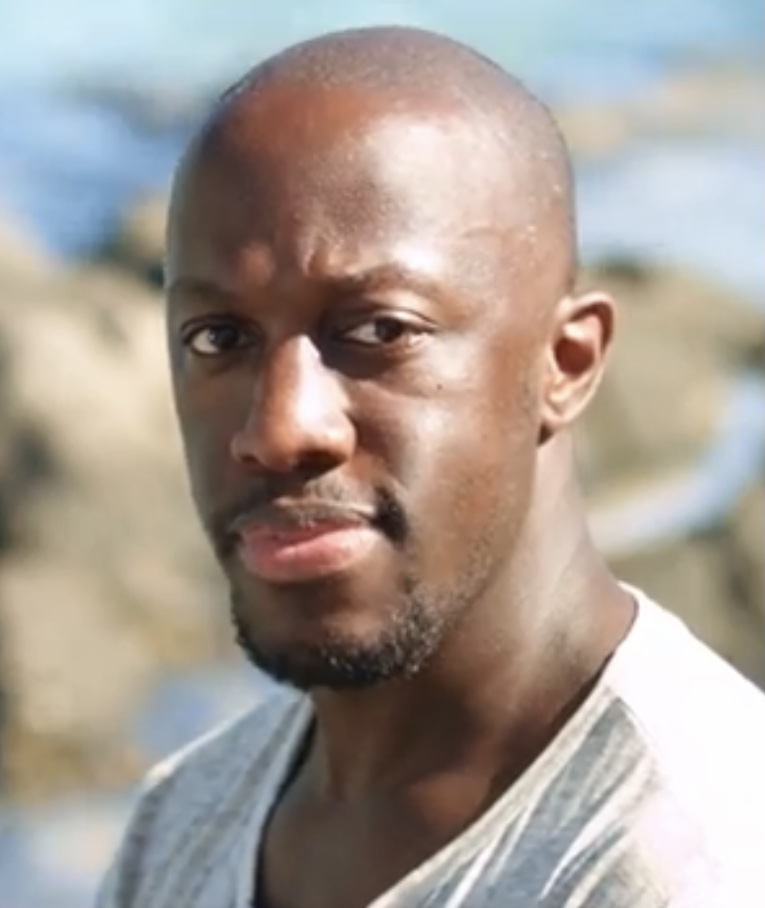
- Terera in 2015

Background information
- Born: Giles Terera; 14 December 1976 (age 49); London, England
- Genres: Musical theatre; cabaret; jazz; gospel; blues; acoustic music; folk rock
- Occupations: Actor; filmmaker; musician; composer
- Instruments: Vocals; guitar; piano
- Years active: 1999—present

Giles Terera MBE (born 14 December 1976) is a British actor, musician, and filmmaker. He is best known for his work in the theatre, particularly in the original cast of the London production of the musical Hamilton, as Aaron Burr, for which he won the 2018 Olivier Award for Best Actor in a Musical. His first documentary, Muse of Fire, premiered in autumn 2013.

== Career ==
Giles Terera trained at Mountview Academy of Theatre Arts. After leaving Mountview in 1999, he joined an acting ensemble at the National Theatre, where he appeared in Troilus and Cressida, Candide, and The Darker Face of the Earth. He then went on to star as the Ugly Duckling in Honk!

Since then Terera has appeared consistently in British theatre, and some of his most notable appearances are in London's National Theatre and the West End. They include: Death and the King's Horseman, The Tempest, Sammy Davis Jr. in The Rat Pack: Live From Las Vegas, RENT, 125th Street, and Jailhouse Rock. He originated the role of Gary Coleman in the London production of Avenue Q. He also appeared as Mafala Hatimbi in The Book of Mormon.

Terera has been nominated for three awards for the Whatsonstage.com Awards. He was nominated for Best Supporting Actor in a Musical for his appearance in Jailhouse Rock, Best Takeover in a Role for The Rat Pack: Live From Las Vegas as Sammy Davis Jr., and for Best Ensemble Performance in Avenue Q. His production of Hamlet, in which he played Horatio, won Best Shakespearean Production, and he accepted the award on behalf of the production. In 2007 Terera became the first Black actor to play Christy in Dublin's Abbey Theatre production of Playboy of the Western World. In 2011 he played Caliban in Trevor Nunn's production of The Tempest opposite Ralph Fiennes at Haymarket Theatre. In 2015 and 2016 he appeared at Shakespeare's Globe Theatre, firstly in King John followed by The Merchant Of Venice, a production starring Jonathan Pryce which toured America, China and Italy. In 2016 Terera appeared in the National Theatre's award-winning production of Ma Rainey's Black Bottom, reportedly spending several months learning to play the double bass for the role. In December 2017 he originated the role of Aaron Burr in the London transfer production of Hamilton, a role for which he won an Olivier Award for Best Actor in a Musical in April 2018.

As well as his numerous stage appearances, Terera has made occasional appearances in film and television. His most notable television appearances was in the CBBC programme Horrible Histories, performing in all five series from 2009 to 2013. He has also appeared in BBC television show Doctors, and in the film London Boulevard. He also appeared in a televised production of Hamlet. In 2020 he appeared in a Channel4 television production Maxxx as Gbenga (Maxxx's father).

Terera is also a filmmaker and musician. His first documentary, Muse of Fire, created with Dan Poole, centres on modern perspectives of Shakespeare, featuring interviews with actors and filmmakers such as Judi Dench, Ian McKellen, Jude Law, Julie Taymor, Fiona Shaw and Baz Luhrmann. The film premiered in autumn 2013 on BBC Four.

Terera's credits as a musician, aside from appearing in numerous musical theatre productions, include composing scores for theatre and performing live as a solo musician. He also composed the score for Muse of Fire, and his vocals can be heard in several songs for Horrible Histories.

In 2013, Terera curated and directed a series of events at the National Theatre as part of its 50th-anniversary celebrations entitled "Walk in the Light", which honoured the contribution of Black artists to British theatre.

Terera was appointed Member of the Order of the British Empire (MBE) in the 2020 New Year Honours for services to theatre.

Terera featured as part of London's New Year celebrations for 2022. He opened the celebrations by delivering a poem referencing the impact and achievements made in 2021.

In 2021, Terera published the book Hamilton and Me.

In 2022, Terera performed "Wait for it" from Hamilton in the Platinum Jubilee celebration.

Terera was awarded the Freedom of the City of London in 2023 in recognition of services to theatre.

== Acting credits ==
=== Film and Television ===
Year	Title	Role	Notes
2001	Doctors	Lee Herridge	One episode, television series
2009–13	Horrible Histories	Various roles, including Sports presenter and Jesse Owens	Appears in all five series, television
2010	London Boulevard	Waiter	Feature film
2010	Hamlet	Horatio	Televised stage performance
2013	Muse of Fire	Himself	Feature-length television documentary. Also served as composer, director, creator, writer and producer
2015–16	Horrible Histories	Various roles	television
2016	Yonderland	Party Guest	Appears in Christmas Special episode
2017	The Current War	Elijah McCoy	
2020	Maxxx	GBenga	
2021	Death of England: Face To Face	Delroy	
2022	Olivier Awards	Guest Presenter	1 episode
2022	Scrooge: A Christmas Carol	Tom Jenkins	Voice
2026	Frank and Louis	Sam	
2026	Kiloran Bay	James	

=== Theatre ===
Year	Title	Role	Theatre	Location
1999	Troilus and Cressida	Ensemble	National Theatre	London
1999	Candide	Ensemble	National Theatre	London
1999–2000	Honk!	Ugly	National Theatre	London
2000	The Darker Face of the Earth	Ensemble	National Theatre	London
2002–03	125th Street	Marvin Gaye	Shaftesbury Theatre	West End
2004–05	Jailhouse Rock	Quickly Robinson	Theatre Royal Haymarket	West End
2005	The Rat Pack: Live From Las Vegas	Sammy Davis Jr.	Theatre Royal Haymarket	West End
2006–07	Avenue Q	Gary Coleman	Noël Coward Theatre	West End
2007	Playboy of the Western World	Christy	Abbey Theatre	Dublin
2002	RENT	Mr Jefferson	Prince Of Wales Theatre	West End
2009	Death and the King's Horseman	Praise Singer	National Theatre	London
2009–10	The Rat Pack: Live From Las Vegas	Sammy Davis Jr.	Adelphi Theatre	West End
2010	Hamlet	Horatio	National Theatre	London
2015	The Tempest	Caliban	National Theatre	London
2016	Ma Rainey's Black Bottom	Slow Drag	National Theatre	London
2016	The Merchant of Venice	Prince of Morocco	National Theatre	London
2017	The Resistible Rise of Arturo Ui	Ernesto Roma	National Theatre	London
2017–19, 2022	Hamilton	Aaron Burr	Victoria Palace Theatre	West End
2019	Rosmersholm	Andreas Kroll	Duke of York's Theatre	West End
2022	Blue/Orange	Robert	UK tour	UK
2022	The Meaning of Zong	Olaudah Equiano	Bristol Old Vic	Bristol
2022	Blues for an Alabama Sky	Guy Jacobs	National Theatre	London
2022–23	Othello	Othello	National Theatre	London
2023	The Meaning of Zong	Olaudah Equiano	Barbican Centre	London
2023	Clyde's	Montrellous	Donmar Warehouse	London
2024	Passing Strange	Narrator	Young Vic	London
2024–25	Dr. Strangelove	General Turgidson	Noël Coward Theatre and Bord Gáis Energy Theatre	West End and Dublin
2025	Hamlet	Hamlet	Chichester Festival Theatre	Chichester
2025–26	Oh, Mary!	Mary’s Husband	Trafalgar Theatre	West End
2026	One Flew Over the Cuckoo's Nest	Dale Harding	The Old Vic	London
2026–27	A Christmas Carol	Ebenezer Scrooge	The Old Vic	London

== Awards ==
Year	Award	Title	Production	Result
2004	WhatsOnStage Awards	Best Supporting Actor	Jailhouse Rock	Nominated
2005	WhatsOnStage Awards	Best Takeover in a Role	The Rat Pack: Live From Las Vegas	Nominated
2007	WhatsOnStage Awards	Best Ensemble	Avenue Q	Won
2011	KidScreen Awards	Best Acting	Horrible Histories	Won
2011	WhatsOnStage Awards	Best Shakespearean Production	Hamlet	Won
2012	KidScreen Awards	Best Acting	Horrible Histories	Won
2014	Falstaff Awards	Best Film	Muse of Fire	Won
2018	Laurence Olivier Awards	Best Actor in a Musical	Hamilton	Won
2018	BroadwayWorld UK Awards	Best Actor in a New Musical	Hamilton	Won
2019	WhatsOnStage Awards	Best Actor in a Musical	Hamilton	Nominated
2020	WhatsOnStage Awards	Best Supporting Actor in a Play	Rosmersholm	Nominated
2022	UK Theatre Awards	Best Actor	The Meaning of Zong	Won
2022	BBC Audio Drama Awards	Best Actor	The Meaning of Zong	Nominated
2022	BBC Audio Drama Awards	Best use of Sound	The Meaning of Zong	Won
2022	Evening Standard Theatre Awards	Best Actor	Blues For An Alabama Sky	Nominated
2023	Laurence Olivier Awards	Best Actor	Blues For An Alabama Sky	Nominated
2023	Critics Circle Theatre Awards	Best Actor	Blues For An Alabama Sky and Othello	Won
2024	Laurence Olivier Awards	Best Actor In A Supporting Role	Clyde’s	Nominated
2024	British Academy Television Awards	BAFTA Special Award	Horrible Histories	Won
2026	Laurence Olivier Awards	Best Actor In A Supporting Role	Oh, Mary!	Nominated
2026	Stalls to Stage Awards	Best Actor	Hamlet	Won
