= Lala Drona =

American painter

- Born: 1988 (age 37–38); Denver, Colorado, US
- Education: University of Colorado (BA), Royal College of Art (MA)
- Occupation: Painter
- Website: https://www.laladrona.com/

Lala Drona (born 1988) is an American painter of Venezuelan heritage, now based in Paris. Her paintings examine the body in collision with violence, technology, and social expectation, and the tension between physical and digital experience. Her work also extends into writing, video, performance, and a long-running fictional universe that feeds back into the paintings. Her work is held in the collection of the Musée Artistes Femmes in Switzerland.

== Early Life and Education ==
Drona was born in Denver, Colorado, to a mother who emigrated from Caracas, Venezuela, and a father from New York. She began painting in childhood.

Born with unilateral breast agenesis (sometimes described as unilateral breast hypoplasia), in which one breast develops at puberty and the other does not, she kept the condition secret through her adolescence, including from her family, and has said art became a protective space during that time. She had her first reconstructive surgery at 16.

After two years living in South America, she graduated from the University of Colorado Boulder with a BA in creative writing in 2012. She received a Master's degree in painting from the Royal College of Art in London, where she studied under the philosopher Sue Golding.

== Career ==
=== Paris, 2012–2019 ===
Drona began her professional art career upon her move to Paris in 2012. One of her first works from this time was The Breast Series (2012–2013), painted self-portraits in which she disclosed her unilateral breast agenesis publicly for the first time. In 2015, she was among twelve international artists in Je suis... XYZ, a multidisciplinary exhibition in Paris exploring identity and freedom of expression that was inspired by the "Je suis Charlie" slogan that circulated after the January 2015 attacks. In 2018 and 2019, she was artist in residence near Seville and in Gothenburg.

Her work of this period examined the female gaze and the treatment of women's bodies online. The triptych The Power of the Click (2018), which explored whether the treatment of women's bodies online shapes their treatment offline, was shown in Castilblanco de los Arroyos, near Seville, in an exhibition of international artists in residence, and was published by the Poetry Society of New York. In 2019 she exhibited The Box at Konstepidemin in Gothenburg, a series of grayscale paintings shown with a video of the artist confined in a box that addressed voyeurism and online identity. She also presented the painting The Female Frame at the Cité internationale des arts in Paris that October, a work one reviewer described as reversing the conventions of the male gaze. Her diptych Between Us (2019) later entered the collection of the Musée Artistes Femmes in Lausanne.

=== 2020–2024 ===
In 2021, Drona had the breast implant from an earlier reconstructive surgery removed and in response began a series of void paintings, which she has described as a way of confronting a physical absence she had not seen in seventeen years. Works of hers were published in Dreamhouse, a zine marking the 50th anniversary of Womanhouse (2022), and her essay "There Are No Great Young Artists" was published in La Revue Espace Artistes Femmes no. 2 in 2023. Her painting Proclaim was reproduced on the cover of The Oxford Handbook of LGBTI Law (2024).

In April 2024, she presented the solo exhibition Virtual Reverence at Elios Gallery in Paris; the Maison de l'Amérique Latine featured it in its "Hors les murs" program listings. Its central work, a painting with a live-camera video screen set into the canvas, relayed viewers' faces to an adjoining room without their knowledge. That year she also received a Soho House International Artist Fellowship and took part in Fall at Beaconsfield Gallery in London.

=== 2025-present ===
From February to March 2026 she showed Explant, Fantastical B****, and Madame Sidewalk in Immanence at Galerie Robegago in Paris, and she was named a finalist for the 20th Prisma Art Prize. In 2026 she painted Caracas, a triptych in oil and acrylic on canvas responding to the January 3, 2026, United States military operation in Venezuela, which she has described as a conflict between the two countries that made her; she named it after the city, on the model of Picasso's Guernica.

== Artistry ==
=== Methodology ===
Drona filmed her reconstructive surgeries and watched the footage repeatedly in the studio, so that the surgeons' gestures "made their way into my body, and then onto the canvas." Her paintings are started freeform on a canvas on a floor before moving to a wall for more deliberate decisions. Drona describes her paintings "almost as bodies and interventions happening on them". Following the Gutai movement's use of tools other than the brush, she paints with her fingers, rags, and gauze. Her main mediums are oil and acrylic often at large scale, including gauze-wrapped canvases. She has described her work as punk and connects the angst viewers perceive in her paintings to her teenage years in the subculture.

=== Themes ===
Critics have described her experience of breast agenesis and reconstructive surgery as a foundational theme in her practice. In Art Plugged, Len Gordon writes that this history reverberates through the work. He compares one of her figures to Edvard Munch's The Scream, observing that hers comes apart from within, he also writes that she draws on Elinor Cleghorn's Unwell Women. Writing in Creatrix, Claire Zakiewicz places the paintings at the unstable border between body and image, shaped by the aftermath of surgery. She also writes that the smooth voids in Drona's paintings evoke the emptiness of the digital.

Speaking to curator Carrie Scott on the podcast Seen, Drona argues that beauty today is defined by an absence of resistance. She contrasts her paintings with the flattening and smoothing of images online, and describes painting as a form of protest and a way of holding on to the physical world. Scott describes the paintings as visceral, layered and haunting, and places them within questions about what a post-digital world might look like. In a 2025 interview for the Royal College of Art, Drona describes her work as “the final cry of our dying physicality” in a world becoming more digital and more violent.

Drona describes herself as an intersectional feminist. Her work examines the female gaze and the male gaze. She has traced this interest to her adolescence, when the sexualized media culture of the 2000s, exemplified by Girls Gone Wild and the “flash me” trend it inspired in schools, made her fear that her unilateral agenesis would be exposed. She has described her floor-to-wall painting method as a way of taking back control of the gaze and redefining the body on her own terms.

=== Influences ===
Drona has cited Julia Kristeva's theory of abjection as central to her concept of the "abject feminine," and has drawn on Gilles Deleuze and Félix Guattari's Anti-Oedipus in her writing on her paintings. The Maison de l'Amérique Latine describes her work as influenced by Laura Mulvey's theory of the male gaze and as echoing Tracey Emin and Tony Oursler in combining traditional media with new technology.

== Based On A Fact ==
Since 2012, Drona has written Based on a Fact, a mock-journalistic blog in which invented journalists report on a fictional artist named Lala Drona and her "Lala Laboratories," where inspiration is extracted from Muses through lab experiments.
