= Paul Keating (actor) =

English actor (born 1976)

Paul Keating (born in 1976) is an English actor. He has been nominated twice for an Olivier Award for his performances on the West End stage. He began acting at the age of 12, appearing as Gavroche in Les Misérables at The Palace Theatre for 10 months.

== Stage career ==
Keating, a native of London, won the title role in the West End production of Pete Townshend's musical Tommy after 12 auditions in 1996 from open auditions, spanning 6 months, around the world. He was subsequently nominated for an Olivier Award for Best Actor in a Musical for this performance.

Keating has appeared in Lost in Yonkers (1992/3) at the Novello Theatre and as The Balladeer in Stephen Sondheim's Assassins at the New End Theatre. In 1999 he appeared in Escape from Pterodactyl Island at the Pleasance Theatre and as Agon in La Cava (2000) at the Piccadilly Theatre and Victoria Palace Theatre.

Keating played the lead role, Straight Dave, in the 2001 world premiere production of Closer to Heaven, a musical by Pet Shop Boys and Jonathan Harvey. Keating was nominated for his second Olivier award for his performance. Keating performed on the soundtrack album Closer to Heaven (Original Cast Recording) (October 2001) and a single of his recording of "Positive role model" was planned but cancelled when the London production closed.

Keating starred as Giglio in the UK premiere of the musical The Rose and the Ring at the Hen and Chickens Theatre (2001/2) and in September 2002 joined the original cast of Full Monty at the Prince of Wales Theatre playing Ethan Girard. In 2003 Keating was cast as Henrik Egerman in Stephen Sondheim's A Little Night Music at the Courtyard Theater at The Chicago Shakespeare Theatre, which was in collaboration with the Donmar Warehouse Theatre, opening on 23 December 2003 (closing 15 February 2004).

2004/5 saw Keating playing Prince of Palma in Don Carlos by Frederick Schiller in a new version by Mike Poulton directed by Michael Grandage at The Crucible Theatre Sheffield and Gielgud Theatre, London.

In February 2006 he played Maurice Travis / Jamie Barnes in Gladiator Games by Tanika Gupta at the Theatre Royal Stratford East.

Keating played the leading role of 'Seymour' opposite Sheridan Smith in the 2006/7 production of Little Shop of Horrors at the Menier Chocolate Factory. The show was a sell out success and transferred to the West End to the Duke of York's Theatre and Ambassadors Theatre. The show was nominated for best Musical at the 2008 Olivier awards.

In December 2007 Keating played Buttons in the first production of Stephen Fry's Cinderella at the Old Vic Theatre. From 23 October to 29 November 2008, Keating played Jamie in the Leicester Square Theatre's production of Matthew Todd's Blowing Whistles, alongside Stuart Laing and newcomer Daniel Finn.

In May 2009, Keating returned to the stage in the first West End production of Tick, Tick... Boom! playing the role of John. The production was part of the Notes From New York season at the Duchess Theatre.

2011 saw Paul recreating the role of the Scarecrow in the new West End production of The Wizard of Oz at the London Palladium. His other role in this musical is Aunt Em and Uncle Henry's farmhand, Hunk, who is the Scarecrow's Kansas counterpart.

In 2015 Paul starred as Elliot Garfield in the first London production of the original Broadway version of the Marvin Hamlisch and Neil Simon musical The Goodbye Girl. The production was directed by Adam Lenson and ran for four weeks Upstairs at The Gatehouse.

In 2016 Keating enjoyed critical acclaim for his portrayal of the title role in Mike Poulton's new play Kenny Morgan directed by Lucy Bailey. Inspired by Terence Rattigan's The Deep Blue Sea, the play is based on the real life events that inspired Rattigan to pen The Deep Blue Sea, focusing on Rattigan's relationship with younger actor, Kenny Morgan. The play enjoyed two runs at The Arcola Theatre in East London, when Keating was shortlisted as one of four actors for Best Male performance at The Offies 2017 . Lucy Bailey was also nominated - as Best Director. He was awarded 'Stage Performance Of The Year' at The Attitude awards by Attitude (magazine).

In 2019 Paul was cast as Uncle Frank in the European premier of Little Miss Sunshine by James Lapine and William Finn - a musical, based on the Academy Award-winning movie of the same name. The production saw Keating returning to The Arcola Theatre and then embarking on a tour of the U.K. and Ireland until the end of September 2019, when the production completed its tour.

== Television and film career ==
- BBC's Troublemakers with Keeley Hawes, his first television role, age 13
- Heterosexuality by Rikki Beadle Blair for Channel 4 - Prequel to Metrosexuality, also by Beadle Blair (1999)
- Metrosexuality by Rikki Beadle Blair for Channel 4 (2001) with Noel Clarke
- Secret Britain for Channel 4
- "The Ambassador" with Pauline Collins for BBC1
- The Princess and the Goblin (1990): Singing voice of Curdie.
- Pen Pics for Channel 4
- The Bill for ITV1
- Casualty for BBC1
- Keating appeared in the feature film Bring Me The Head Of Mavis Davis (1998) playing Danny Aiello's son Paul Rathbone. and as an apostle in the 2000 Gale Edwards' video adaptation of "Jesus Christ Superstar" for Really Useful Films.
- In BBC One's EastEnders Keating appeared for 12 episodes as Christian Clarke's love interest/friend James Mackie.
- ITV "Injustice" playing Matthew Bell
- BBC One's "Holby City" in 2014 & 2015 he appeared as paramedic Gavin Bedford and his alter ego, drag queen, Glory Bee
- Channel 4's "Humans"
- BBC's "Against The Law" (2017) as Fanny with Daniel Mays and Richard Gadd
- NFTS Short film Birthday Boy as Robert, Alex’s supportive father, directed by Leo Lebeau.
