= Straight Dave =

Straight Dave may refer to:

- Straight Dave, a character in Closer to Heaven
- Straight Dave, an alias used by the character Brüno in the film Brüno
