= Hanako Footman =

British actress

- Born: 27 April 1994 (age 32); Wimbledon, London, England
- Education: London Academy of Music and Dramatic Art
- Occupations: Actress, writer
- Years active: 2011–present

Hanako Footman is an English actress and writer. On television, starred in the BBC Two sitcom Defending the Guilty (2018–2019). Her debut novel Mongrel was published in 2024.

== Early life and education ==
Hanako Footman was born to a Japanese mother and an English-Irish father and grew up in Wimbledon, South London. She has two sisters; her sister Erika is a musician.

Footman took a year-long foundation course at the London Academy of Music and Dramatic Art (LAMDA).

== Career ==
=== Acting ===
Footman made her television debut as Isabella in an episode of the 2012 ITV miniseries The Town. She starred in the 2015 production of Thyestes at the Courtyard Theatre, London and Modern Love, which was put on in 2016 at the Pleasance in London followed by a run at the Etcetera Theatre in Camden.

She returned to television in 2017 when she guest-starred as Lily in a season 2 episode of the Netflix historical drama The Crown, titled "A Company of Men". She also made her feature film debut in the indie horror An American Exorcism.

The following year, Footman appeared in the comedy horror film Slaughterhouse Rulez and starred in the lead role of Pia in the BBC Two sitcom Defending the Guilty; the rest of the series aired in 2019. Also in 2019, she had film roles as Nicole Mowbray in Gavin Hood's Official Secrets and Ruby in Jason Lei Howden's action-comedy Guns Akimbo. She made guest appearances in the E4 sitcom Dead Pixels and the Amazon Prime thriller Absentia, and appeared in the Icelandic series Stella Blómkvist.

In 2022, Footman originated the character Devon in Theresa Rebeck's play Mad House for its David Harbour-led world premiere and run at the Ambassadors Theatre, marking Footman's West End debut. She then appeared in Not Yet Midnight, of the three translated plays featured in the Royal Court Theatre's New Plays: Japan presentation in January 2023.

=== Writing ===
Footman's debut novel Mongrel was longlisted for the 2021 Mo Siewcharran Prize and was published in February 2024 by Footnote Press. It was then shortlisted for the Waterstones Debut Fiction Prize. It was also longlisted for the Polari Prize in the First Book category. Footman was one of several authors to withdraw her book from the Prize to protest the inclusion of John Boyne over his anti-transgender views.

Footman has a forthcoming untitled young adult (YA) occult novel, set for a 2027 publication date via Doubleday.

== Personal life ==
Footman is in a relationship with fellow actor Jack Farthing, who also appeared in the film Official Secrets.

== Bibliography ==
- Mongrel (2024)
- Untitled YA novel (2027)

== Filmography ==
=== Film ===
Year	Title	Role	Notes
2017	Re-introduction	Sarah	Short film
2017	An American Exorcism	Tammy	
2018	Slaughterhouse Rulez	Poppet Chenvix-Trench	
2018	Uneatable	The Creature	Short film
2019	Official Secrets	Nicole Mowbray	
2019	Guns Akimbo	Ruby	
2022	Canyon Del Muerto	Elizabeth Bixler	
2023	Skewered	Fleur	
2024	Canyon of the Dead	Elizabeth Bixler	
2026	Crime 101	Lisa	
TBA	As Deep as the Grave	TBA	Post-production

=== Television ===
Year	Title	Role	Notes
2012	The Town	Isabella	1 episode
2017	The Crown	Lily	Episode: "A Company of Men"
2018–2019	Defending the Guilty	Pia	Main role
2019	Dead Pixels	Briony	Episode: "Big Nose"
2019	Absentia	Petra Bishop	Episode: "Bolo"
2021	Stella Blómkvist	Alba Noel	2 episodes
2022	Toast of Tinseltown	Sorry Johnson	Episode: "Monster Mash"
2024–present	We Might Regret This	Olyvya	

=== Other ===
Year	Title	Role	Notes
2011	"Girl Panic!" by Duran Duran		Music video
2022	HUSH - Crane	Alma	Video game
2023	Baldur's Gate 3	Araj Oblodra, Naoise Nallinto	Video game

== Stage ==
Year	Title	Role	Notes
2015	Thyestes	Aerope	Courtyard Theatre, London
2016	Modern Love	Ella	The Pleasance, Edinburgh / Etcetera Theatre, London
2022	Mad House	Devon	Ambassadors Theatre, London
2023	Not Yet Midnight	Woman	Royal Court Theatre, London; Part of New Plays: Japan presentation

== Audio ==
Year	Title	Role	Notes
2018	Empress of All Seasons	Narrator	Novel by Emiko Jean
2019	The Flower Arranger	Narrator	Novel by JJ Ellis
2021	The Fall of Koli	Narrator (Note: With Saffron Coomber.)	Novel by MR Carey
2021	The Pact	Narrator	Novel by Sharon J. Bolton
2021	Toddler Hunting and Other Stories	Narrator	Short stories by Taeko Kono
2021	Unwell Women: A Journey Through Medicine and Myth in a Man-Made World	Narrator	Book by Eleanor Cleghorn
2021	The Fboy Podcast	Host	with Katharine Orchard and Hannah van der Westhuysen
2023	A Day of Fallen Night	Narrator (Note: with Ellie Kendrick, Sheila Atim, Thoren Ferguson)	Novel by Samantha Shannon
2024	Butter	Narrator	Novel by Asako Yuzuki
