= Closer to Heaven (original cast recording) =

Cast recording by Closer to Heaven Original London Cast
- Released: 8 October 2001 (UK)
- Recorded: 2001
- Genre: Cast recording
- Label: Sony (UK)
- Producer: Pet Shop Boys, Stephen Hague

Closer to Heaven is an album of songs from the Pet Shop Boys 2001 stage musical Closer to Heaven. The songs feature the original London production cast and production credits go to Pet Shop Boys and Stephen Hague.

== Track listing ==
1. "My night" – Billie Trix and Cast
2. "Something special" – Straight Dave
3. "Closer to heaven" – Shell and Straight Dave
4. "In denial" – Vic and Shell
5. "Call me old-fashioned" – Bob Saunders
6. "Nine out of ten" – Shell and Straight Dave
7. "It's just my little tribute to Caligula, darling!" – Billie Trix and Billie's Babes
8. "Hedonism"
9. "Friendly fire" – Billie Trix
10. "Shameless" – Vile Celebrities
11. "Vampires" – Vic and Billie Trix
12. "Closer to heaven" – Straight Dave and Mile End Lee
13. "Out of my system" – Shell and Billie's Babes
14. "K-Hole" – Billie Trix
15. "For all of us" – Straight Dave
16. "Closer to heaven" – Straight Dave
17. "Positive role model" – Straight Dave

== Personnel ==
- Neil Tennant
- Chris Lowe
- Frances Barber (Billie Trix)
- Paul Keating (Straight Dave)
- Stacey Roca (Shell Christian)
- Tom Walker (Mile End Lee)
- David Burt (Vic Christian)
- Paul Broughton (Bob Saunders)
- David Langham (Flynn)

Guest musicians

- Chris Nightingale – Programming, additional keyboards and arrangements. Piano on 9 & 15
- Chuck Norman – Programming
- Pete Gleadall – Original programming
- Chris Zippel – Original programming and production on 17
- Tessa Niles, Katie Kissoon, Carol Kenyon & Tommy Blazie – Backing vocals on 1 & 10
- Claire Worall – Backing vocals on 10
- Jonathan Harvey – Backing vocals on 5
- Mark Stanway & Louie Spence – Solo vocals on 10
- Craig Armstrong – Orchestration and original production on 11
- C.Jay Ranger – Solo vocals on 10 & backing vocals on 13
- Akiya Henry – Backing vocals on 13

== Reception ==
AllMusic wrote "Closer to Heaven is vibrant and brash with lush pop decadence, but also a brazen tale of sex and drugs. What's more inviting is how the overall soundscape is uninhibited. Fans should be pleased with the music, for it's all made for a stage. Whether it's dancing or theatrics, the Pet Shop Boys are taken by the excitement as well."

== Chart performance ==
Chart (2001)	Peak position
UK Albums Chart	107
