= David Burt (actor) =

British actor

David Burt (born 1953) is a British actor, known primarily for his many and wide-ranging West End performances.

David Burt is the son of Pip Hinton, better known for her role in Crackerjack alongside Eamonn Andrews and later Leslie Crowther. He graduated from RADA.

His West End theatre work includes Enjolras and Javert in Les Misérables, Anatoly Sergievsky in Chess, Pontius Pilate in Jesus Christ Superstar, Orin Scrivello in Little Shop of Horrors, Agustín Magaldi in Evita, Munkustrap in Cats, and John Jasper in The Mystery of Edwin Drood. He has also played many leading roles at the Royal National Theatre and the Royal Shakespeare Company. His television work includes The Trojan Horse, Poldark and The Merchant of Venice.

Burt played the flamboyant Count Fosco opposite Yvette Robinson in Andrew Lloyd Webber's The Woman in White at the Palace Theatre (2005) and was featured as Captain Andy Hawks in Show Boat at the Royal Albert Hall. He played nefarious prison officer Jim Fenner in Bad Girls: The Musical at the Garrick Theatre in London's West End (2007). He toured the UK Antarctic explorer Robert Falcon Scott in G. M. Calhoun's The Last South (2008).

Other London credits include Captain Harkness in the world premiere musical adaptation of The Far Pavilions, Vic Christian in the Pet Shop Boys' musical Closer to Heaven, and Ernest Hemingway in the musical Beautiful and Damned. He also appeared in the Royal National Theatre production of Leonard Bernstein's musical Candide. He also played Monsieur Firmin in the Sydmonton Festival workshop of Andrew Lloyd Webber's The Phantom of the Opera.

David Burt created the role of King John in Blondel, by Tim Rice and Stephen Oliver. He can be heard on the 1985 original London cast recording of Les Misérables, as Enjolras, and the 1996 London cast recording of Jesus Christ Superstar. He was among the only members of the original principal Les Misérables cast not to appear at the 25th Anniversary concert, claiming he would not be able to sing the part in the encore anymore.

In 2011, he starred as Zangler in Crazy for You at the Novello Theatre, London. Notable hijinks included handing a hard hat to an orchestra member during the bows, after accidentally sending a chair into the pit during Act 2. In 2014 he appeared alongside Gina Beck, Daniel Boys and Eve Polycarpou in Jacques Brel is Alive and Well and Living in Paris at the Charing Cross Theatre.

In 2016, Burt starred in the world premiere of The Buskers Opera in London. He is currently appearing in The Last Ones by Maxim Gorky at London's Jermyn Street Theatre.

== Credits ==
=== Film & TV ===
Year	Title	Role	Notes
1979-80	Flambards	Jeremy Cambers	ITV
2014	The Trojan Horse	Agememnon	BBC
2017	Poldark	Seth Curran	BBC

=== West End Credits ===
Year(s)	Production	Role	Theatre	Location	Classification
1974	The Farjoen Papers	Herbert Farjoen	Harold Pinter Theatre	West End	Play
1975	Happy As A Sandbag	Hitler	Ambassadors Theatre	West End	Play
1978	Traitors	Thomas Doherty		West End	Play
1980-1982	Evita	Agustín Magaldi	Prince Edward Theatre	West End	Musical
1982	Cats	Munkustrap / Ensemble	New London Theatre	West End	Musical
1983	Little Shop Of Horrors	Orin Scrivello & Others	Comedy Theatre	West End	Musical
1983-1984	Blondel	John	Manchester Opera House / Old Vic Theatre	Manchester / London	Musical
1985-1987	Les Miserables	Enjolras	Palace Theatre	West End	Musical
1987	The Mystery of Edwin Drood	John Jasper	Savoy Theatre	West End	Musical
1988-1989	Chess	Anatoly Sergievsky	Prince Edward Theatre	West End	Musical
1990-1991	Les Miserables	Inspector Javert	Palace Theatre	West End	Musical
1993	Les Miserables	Inspector Javert	Palace Theatre	West End	Musical
1994	Out of the Blue	Hyashi	Shaftesbury Theatre	West End	Musical
1995	Edmund Kean	Edmund Kean	Arts Theatre	West End	Musical
1996-1997	Jesus Christ Superstar	Pontius Pilate	Lyceum Theatre	West End	Musical
1998	Pippin	Leading Player	Bridewell Theatre	West End	Musical
2000	Napoleon	Tallyrand	Shaftesbury Theatre	West End	Musical
2001	Closer to Heaven	Vic Christian	Arts Theatre	West End	Musical
2002-2003	Taboo	Derick/Patel	The Venue Theatre	West End	Musical
2003-2004	Peter Pan	Mr. Darling	Savoy Theatre	West End	Play
2003-2004	The Pirates of Penzance	Sergeant of Police	Savoy Theatre	West End	Musical
2005-2006	The Woman in White	Count Fosco	Palace Theatre	West End	Musical
2007	Bad Girls: The Musical	Jim Fenner	Garrick Theatre	West End	Musical
2010	The Fantasticks	Bellamy	Duchess Theatre	West End	Musical
2011	Crazy for You	Bela Zangler	Regent's Park Open Air Theatre	London	Musical
2012-2013	Kiss Me, Kate	First Gangstar / Paul	Chichester Festival Theatre / Old Vic Theatre	Chichester / London	Musical

=== Off-West End Credits ===
Year(s)	Production	Role	Theatre	Location	Classification
1990	The Island of the Mighty John Arden	Modred		Off-West End	Play
1991	Shadowmoves	Ratcatcher		Off-West End	Play
1991-92	La Traviata	Georgio Germont	Donmar Warehouse	Off-West End	Opera
2003	The Beautiful and Damned	Lord de Brett	Park Theatre	Off-West End	Musical
2004	The Far Pavilions	Harkness		London	Musical
2006	Days of Hope	Carlos	King's Head Theatre	Off-West End	Musical
2008	In The Balance	Larry	New End Theatre	Off-West End	Play
2009	Plague Over England	Witherby / Brian	King's Head Theatre	Off-West End	Play
2009	Hetty Fienstein's Wedding Anniversary	Harry/Ben	New End Theatre	Off-West End	Musical
2010	Slave	Gadd	Theatre 503	Off-West End	Musical
2010	Porn: The Musical	Martin Scoresleazy	Theatre 503	Off-West End	Musical
2011	Life After	Kit	New End Theatre	Off-West End	Play
2011	Greeks at the Gate	Achilles	Gate Theatre	Off-West End	Play
2012	The Kissing Dance	Mr Hardcastle	Jermyn Street Theatre	Off-West End	Play
2013	Mr Happiness	Mr Happiness	The Young Vic	London	Play
2013	The Water Engine	Oberman	The Young Vic	London	Play
2014	Jacques Brel is Alive and Well and Living in Paris	Man 1	Charing Cross Theatre	Off-West End	Musical
2016	The Busker's Opera	Peachum	Park Theatre	Off-West End	Opera
2016	The Last Ones	Dr. Leshch	Jermyn Street Theatre	Off-West End	Play

=== National Theatre Credits ===
Year(s)	Production	Role	Theatre	Location	Classification
1999	Troilus and Cressida	Menelaus	Olivier Theatre	National Theatre	Opera
1999-2000	Candide	Captain / Inquisitor / Governor	Olivier Theatre	National Theatre	Musical
1999-2000	Honk!	Drake / Bullfrog	Olivier Theatre	National Theatre	Musical
2000	The Villain's Opera	Peachum	Olivier Theatre	National Theatre	Opera
2007	A Woman Killed with Kindness	Jenkin	Olivier Theatre	National Theatre	Play

=== Touring & Regional Credits ===
Year(s)	Production	Role	Theatre	Location	Classification
1983-1984	Blondel	John	Manchester Opera House / Old Vic	Manchester / London	Musical
1985	The Phantom of the Opera	Monsieur Firmin	Sydmonton Court	Ecchinswell	Musical
1985	Les Miserables	Enjolras	Barbican Theatre	London	Musical
1989	Great Expectations	Herbert Pocket	Liverpool Playhouse	Liverpool	Musical
2001-2002	Pirates of Penzance	Sergeant of Police	—	UK National Tour	Musical
2003	Brighton Rock	Dallow	Bristol Hippodrome	Bristol	Musical
2008	The Last South	Robert Falcon Scott	—	UK National Tour	Musical
2010-2011	Pygmalion	Alfred Doolittle	—	Ireland Tour	Play
2012-2013	Kiss Me, Kate	First Gangstar / Paul	Chichester Festival Theatre / Old Vic Theatre	Chichester / London	Musical
2013	Rockabye Hamlet	Polonius	Royal & Derngate	Northampton	Musical
2017	The Merchant of Venice	The Duke of Venice	Wales Millennium Centre	Cardiff	Opera
2018	A Christmas Carol	Ebenezer Scrooge	Middle Temple Hall	London	Play
