= Shaun McKenna =

English dramatist, lyricist and screenwriter

Shaun Patrick McKenna (born 5 April 1957 in Maidstone, Kent) is an English dramatist, lyricist and screenwriter.

== Biography ==
Shaun McKenna studied at Maidstone Grammar School and the University of Bristol (1975–1978). He was an actor for a few years, then taught drama, and began writing in his late 20s. He married former actress and agent Jenny Hayes in 1985; she died in 2014. Shaun McKenna lives in West London.

== Theatre ==
Shaun McKenna's early theatre plays include Killing Camille (Paines Plough, Old Red Lion 1990, a rehearsed reading directed by Kathy Burke). He began an association with Michael Napier Brown at the Royal Theatre in Northampton for whom he adapted Richard Llewellyn's How Green Was My Valley (1990) in which Aled Jones made his acting debut, and R. F. Delderfield's To Serve Them All My Days (1992). He subsequently wrote a drama, Ruling Passions, which was presented at the Royal in 1995.

He wrote the book for Ben Hur Live, based on the novel by Lew Wallace shown at the O2 arena in September 2009, and in a revised version at the Fiera di Roma, Rome in 2011.

In spring 2012 his stage adaptation of Charles Dance's screenplay for Ladies in Lavender, with Hayley Mills and Belinda Lang, toured the UK. The production won five BroadwayWorld UK Awards 2012, including Best Fringe or Regional Play, Best Director (Robin Lefevre), Best Actress in a Leading Role (Hayley Mills), Best Actress in a Featured Role (Belinda Lang)and Best Actor in a Featured Role (Robert Rees).

In 2014 his stage adaptation of Peter James's novella The Perfect Murder toured the UK, from January to April 2014 with Les Dennis and Claire Goose, and with Robert Daws and Dawn Steele from September 2014. In January 2016 a new tour went out with Shane Richie and Jessie Wallace. After The Perfect Murder, McKenna was commissioned by producers Joshua Andrews and Peter James to adapt James's novel Dead Simple. This toured in 2015 with a cast led by Tina Hobley, Jamie Lomas and Gray O'Brien. In 2017 there was a major UK tour of McKenna's stage version of Not Dead Enough starring Shane Richie, Laura Whitmore and Stephen Billington. Bill Ward subsequently took over from Shane Richie. In 2019, Shaun's fourth Peter James adaptation The House On Cold Hill toured the UK with a cast led by Joe McFadden, Rita Simons and Charlie Clements. McKenna's fifth Peter James adaptation, Looking Good Dead, began a long UK tour in Leicester in June 2021 and, ended in April 2022. It starred Adam Woodyatt and Gaynor Faye. Laurie Brett subsequently took over the female lead. The next play in the series Wish You Were Dead began a UK tour in February 2023, starring Clive Mantle, Giovanna Fletcher and George Rainsford as Roy Grace.

In May 2021 his original thriller Rocky Road streamed during lockdown from Jermyn Street Theatre. Tyger Drew-Honey and Kirsten Foster played the two roles, and the show was directed by Steven Kunis and designed by Ceci Calf.

== Musical theatre ==
Musical theatre credits include Maddie (Salisbury Playhouse 1996, West End 1997) which he wrote with Steven Dexter and Stephen Keeling. He has subsequently written a book, Maddie and Us, about the experience (see below).

He wrote the book for Lautrec (West End 2000), collaborating with Charles Aznavour. Also that year, he and Stephen Keeling contributed additional material for La Cava.

McKenna wrote book and lyrics for the stage adaptation of JRR Tolkien's The Lord of the Rings (Toronto 2006, West End 2007) with Matthew Warchus. The show won seven Dora Mavor Moore Awards including Best Musical for McKenna and Warchus. McKenna's work was nominated for an Olivier Award for Best Musical.

In 2004 McKenna's musical adaptation of Terry Pratchett's Only You Can Save Mankind was premiered at the Edinburgh Festival, with music by Leighton James House and lyrics by Shaun McKenna. An album of songs was released in 2009, prior to a new production.

In 2005 McKenna and Stephen Keeling wrote Heidi, entwining the famous children's story and the life of its creator Johanna Spyri, which was first performed in an open-air production in Walenstadt, Switzerland. Heidi II, a sequel, followed in 2007 and 2008. The One True Thing, a prequel, has been commissioned

He co-wrote Murder Mystery Musical with Alister Cameron and composer Richard Brown, which was performed at the Edinburgh Festival in 2009.

In September 2012 the York Theater in New York premiered a workshop lab production of Last Dance, for which McKenna wrote the book. The songs are by Paul Jabara and the show was directed by Philip Wm. McKinley.

He wrote the book for the arena show The Bible: In The Beginning, with lyrics by Maribeth Derry, planned to open in the US in 2020.

With Chet Walker, McKenna has written Being Jack Cole: The Last Scrapbook a new musical with original music by Guy Kitchenn which will workshop in London in 2023. He has written lyrics for Celtic Warrior, a new musical by Marti Pellow and lyrics for four songs on Pellow's album Stargazer.

In October 2022 the new British musical Are You As Nervous As I Am? played a short run at Greenwich Theatre in London. McKenna wrote the lyrics, with music by Leighton James House and book by Simon Spencer. The cast was led by Katie Elin Salt as fictional diva Peggy Starr, Bill Ward as husband Bob and Emma Thornett as her sister, Janet.

== Screen writing ==
For ITV Shaun McKenna wrote The Crooked Man (2003, a feature directed by David Drury for ARG), and the two part thriller Like Father, Like Son (2005, directed by Nick Laughland for Ecosse Films).

He wrote seven episodes for the last three series of TV series Heartbeat. His first episode, One Small Step won a Royal Television Society Yorkshire Award for Best Drama.

He had a two-part drama Cuckoo in development for ITV with TXTV. In 2014 and 2015 he wrote episodes of the BBC series Doctors.

He wrote and researched several films in the Great West End Theatres series presented by Sir Donald Sinden.

== Radio writing ==
In 2020 McKenna wrote two series of Eleanor Rising, a BBC Radio 4 drama series about Eleanor of Aquitaine. With recording postponed by COVID-19, the first series was broadcast in November 2020, with the second series in April 2021. A third series recorded in June 2022 and will broadcast in September/October.

In July 2021 BBC Radio 4 broadcast his two-part reworking of a Henry Fielding novel, Joseph Andrews Remixed with a cast led by Max Bennett, Lyndsey Marshal, Angus Imrie and Michael Bertenshaw.

McKenna spent much of 2018 writing China Towns, an eleven hour BBC Radio 4 series based on five novels by Arnold Bennett which was broadcast over six weekend in 2019 and is now available on Audible. McKenna and co-writer Lin Coghlan merged and entwined characters and plots from the novels to create a sweeping drama across five decades.

McKenna was a core writer on the BBC's 600-episode First World War drama Home Front, which began broadcasting daily episodes on 4 August 2014. Each episode is set exactly one hundred years before the date of transmission, and centres on a single character's story of life at home during the Great War. He was lead writer on seasons three, six and twelve. Home Front ran until 11 November 2018, the centenary of the end of the First World War.

McKenna was commissioned by BBC Radio 4, alongside Lyn Coghlin, to adapt all nine of John Galsworthy's Forsyte novels, to be transmitted from 2016. The cast includes Joseph Millson as Soames, Juliet Aubrey as Irene and Jessica Raine as Fleur. The complete series is now available on Audible. McKenna adapted four of the eight John le Carré George Smiley novels shown in BBC Radio Four's "Complete Smiley" season – A Murder of Quality, The Looking Glass War, Tinker Tailor Soldier Spy and The Honourable Schoolboy (2009–2010), all of which have been released on BBC audiobooks. He later adapted Winston Graham's novel Marnie for Radio 4 (2011) and Rosemary Sutcliff's Brother Dusty Feet for Radio 4 Extra.

He wrote both original and adapted radio dramas for BBC Radio: The Postman Always Rings Twice (1993), Meeting Jack (1995), The Ghost Train (1997), East of Eden (Classic Serial, 2000), Me and Little Boots (2000) a comedy about Caligula's horse with Leslie Phillips, Smiles of a Summer Night (2001) with Samuel West and Nicholas Farrell, Seawyf and Biscuit (2002), The Cry of the Owl (2002), a World Service adaptation of Mrs. Warren's Profession (2002), and the radio adaptation of To Serve Them All My Days (2005).

== Other ==
McKenna edited eight books of 'Scenes for Actors' for Oberon Books. In 2020 he published a book about the making of his first musical Maddie, called Maddie and Us which was briefly Amazon's best selling theatre book.
