= Hugh Coles =

British actor

- Education: LAMDA
- Occupation: Actor
- Years active: 2017–present

Hugh Coles is an English film and television actor. He is known for his roles in The Festival (2018), Defending the Guilty (2019) and Atlanta (2022) as well as originating the role of George McFly in Back to the Future: The Musical, for which he was nominated for the 2022 Laurence Olivier Award for Best Supporting Actor in a Musical.

== Early life and education ==
Hugh Coles attended the London Academy of Music and Dramatic Art, graduating in 2017.

== Career ==
=== Screen ===
In 2017 Coles made his film debut as "Rex" in The Festival. He also appeared in smaller roles in Urban Myths and Doc Martin in the same year.

In 2019, he appeared as Liam Mingay in the British sitcom Defending the Guilty. In 2020, Coles was a regularly featured contributor on the Channel 5 TV show NFL End Zone.

He has also appeared in Death in Paradise (2021) and as "Socks" in Donald Glover's TV series Atlanta (2022).

=== Stage ===
Since 2019, he has been involved with the original production of Back to the Future: The Musical, including its run at the Manchester Opera House and the Adelphi Theatre in London's West End in 2021.

For his role as George McFly, Coles won the 2022 WhatsOnStage Award for Best Supporting Actor in a Male Identifying Role. and was nominated for the 2022 Laurence Olivier Award for Best Supporting Actor in a Musical. In October 2022, it was announced that Coles would reprise the role on Broadway, joining co-star Roger Bart when the show opened at the Winter Garden Theatre in June 2023.

== Filmography ==
TV & Film
Year	Title	Role	Notes
2018	The Festival	Rex	Supporting
2018	Urban Myths	PC Horley	1 episode
2018–2019	Defending the Guilty	Liam Mingay	6 episodes
2019	Doc Martin	Gerry Hammond	1 episode
2021	Death in Paradise	Hugo Pickford	1 episode
2022	Atlanta	Socks	2 episodes
2023	Dreamland	Dom	6 episodes
2023	Juice	Pat	6 episodes
2024	Baby Reindeer	Francis	2 episodes
2025	My Oxford Year	Ridley	Netflix film

Stage
Year	Show	Role	Venue
2020	Back to the Future: The Musical	George McFly	Manchester Opera House
2021–2022	Back to the Future: The Musical	George McFly	Adelphi Theatre, London
2023–2025	Back to the Future: The Musical	George McFly	Winter Garden Theatre, Broadway

== Accolades ==
Year	Award	Category	Work	Result	Ref.
2022	Laurence Olivier Award	Best Actor in a Supporting Role in a Musical	Back to the Future: The Musical	Nominated	
2022	WhatsOnStage Award	Best Actor in a Male Identifying Role in a Musical	Back to the Future: The Musical	Won	
2022	Stage Debut Awards	Best Debut in a Musical	Back to the Future: The Musical	Nominated	
2022	Stage Debut Awards	Best West End Debut	Back to the Future: The Musical	Nominated	
2024	Broadway.com Audience Awards	Favorite Breakthrough Performance (Male)	Back to the Future: The Musical	Nominated	

== See also ==
- List of British actors
