= Defending the Guilty =

2019 British sitcom

- Genre: Sitcom
- Written by: Kieron Quirke
- Directed by: Tom George
- Starring: Will Sharpe; Katherine Parkinson; Gwyneth Keyworth; Hugh Coles; Hanako Footman; Prasanna Puwanarajah; Mark Bonnar; Claudia Jessie
- Country of origin: United Kingdom
- Original language: English
- No. of series: 1
- No. of episodes: 6

Production
- Executive producers: Kenton Allen; Saurabh Kakkar; Jim Field Smith; Kieran Quirke; Kate Daughton
- Producer: Georgie Fallon
- Running time: 30 minutes
- Production company: Big Talk Productions

Original release
- Network: BBC Two
- Release: 19 September 2018 – 22 October 2019

Defending the Guilty is a British television sitcom, starring Will Sharpe and Katherine Parkinson as London barristers. The programme was broadcast in the United Kingdom from 19 September 2018 on BBC Two. A second series was commissioned, but it was cancelled due to the COVID-19 pandemic.

== Production ==
The series was created by Kieron Quirke and based on the 2010 best-selling memoir by Alex McBride (a criminal barrister).

== Cast ==
- Katherine Parkinson as Caroline Bratt, a senior barrister and Will's pupil master
- Will Sharpe as Will Packham, a junior barrister and pupil
- Gwyneth Keyworth as Danielle Sadler, a junior barrister and pupil
- Hanako Footman as Pia, a junior barrister and pupil
- Hugh Coles as Liam Mingay, a junior barrister and pupil
- Prasanna Puwanarajah as Ashley Jeevaratnam, a senior barrister and Danielle's pupil master
- Mark Bonnar as Miles Flynn, the Head of Chambers and Liam's pupil master
- Claudia Jessie as Nessa, Will's girlfriend

== Episodes ==
Series	Episodes	Originally released	
Series	Episodes	First released	Last released
Pilot	1	19 September 2018	
1	6	17 September 2019	22 October 2019

=== Special ===
No.	Title	Directed by	Written by	Original release date	U.K viewers (millions)
0	"Pilot"	Unknown	Unknown	19 September 2018	N/A
Will is a naive, 29-year-old pupil barrister competing with three others for the only available place in chambers. He works for Caroline, who calls herself Mummy and uses him as her personal servant. He works on the case of Mike, whose trial for attempted murder ends in acquittal due to needing to avoid revealing the identity of an informant. Will helps convicted teenage mugger Gracie avoid being imprisoned; soon afterwards she and her accomplice mug him in a tunnel as he is cycling home from work.

=== Series 1 ===
No.	Title	Directed by	Written by	Original release date	U.K viewers (millions)
1	"Episode 1"	Tom George	Kieron Quirke	17 September 2019	N/A (<1.66) (Note: Not reported in the weekly top 15 programmes for four-screen viewer ratings.)
Same episode as pilot
2	"Episode 2"	Tom George	Kieron Quirke	24 September 2019	N/A
Hetty is an obnoxious woman with a long criminal record. She is tried for assaulting Deanna, whom her partner, Lee, cheated with. He gives evidence, ostensibly to help Hetty. He deliberately gives evidence which destroys the defence's case, causing Hetty to be imprisoned for eight months. Lee is pleased to have enabled himself to gain custody of his two children by Hetty and to continue his relationship with Deanna. Will is concerned about a rumour spreading that he had a one-night stand with an attractive young juror, Selina. He says that he merely kissed her.
3	"Episode 3"	Tom George	Kieron Quirke	1 October 2019	N/A
Will tells two colleagues about his encounter with Selina, that he kissed her passionately in the street and in a taxi, but that he did not have sex with her, rejecting her invitation into her house because he wanted to remain faithful to his girlfriend, Nessa. Will and Caroline's case against a mugger collapses due to the evidence against him being lost.
4	"Episode 4"	Tom George	Kieron Quirke	8 October 2019	N/A
Caroline and Will defend a man with an unusual obsession, and also get to know each other a little better.
5	"Episode 5"	Tom George	Kieron Quirke, Alex McBride	15 October 2019	N/A
The pupils are competing in a mock trial, complete with real actors. Liam and Danielle are paired against Pia and Will. Pia's stock has crumbled in Chambers after her sexual indiscretion. Will feels guilty about having leaked the information. Nessa finds out that Will is lying to her and confronts him about his affair.
6	"Episode 6"	Tom George	Kieron Quirke	22 October 2019	N/A
The pupils must address a court for the first time, which for Will means the seemingly straightforward case of defending a drug addict failed by an uncaring system. However, his confidence is rocked by the breakdown of his relationship, and he questions if he is really cut out for a career in law. Caroline is asked to give a lecture to the female bar association, but they are less than pleased by what she has to say.

== Broadcast ==
The programme was broadcast in the United Kingdom from 19 September 2018 on BBC Two. The show was recommissioned for a second series, but was later cancelled due to the impact of the COVID-19 pandemic.
