= The Rat Pack: Live from Las Vegas =

Stage musical

The Rat Pack - Live From Las Vegas
- Promotional image for the West End production
- Music: Various
- Lyrics: Various
- Productions: 2003 West End; 2009 West End revival 2011 West End revival 2017 West End revival

The Rat Pack - Live From Las Vegas is a musical produced by Flying Music Group Ltd. It was conceived and created by Mitch Sebastian, who was also the original director and choreographer.

== Early UK productions ==
Developed over three years the original production opened outside London, England, at the Beck Theatre, Hayes, in January 2000. A short tour featured Louis Hoover as Frank Sinatra, Michael Howe as Dean Martin and Peter Straker as Sammy Davis Junior. The show was rewritten and new set designs were added for a second UK tour in 2001 with Alex Bourne and George Daniel Long playing Dean Martin and Sammy Davis Junior. It was not until the 2002 UK Tour that the show found an audience. Further rewrites and new set designs by Sean Kavanagh with costume designs by Paul Clarke and a cast that featured Stephen Triffit (Sinatra) Mark Adams (Martin) and Long (Davis) led to a 6-month tour.

The production transferred to the West End for a twelve-week engagement at Theatre Royal Haymarket in 2003. It then transferred to Strand Theatre (now Novello Theatre), where it played for two years. The original West End cast starred Adams (Martin), Long (Davis), and Triffitt (Sinatra). In May 2005, the show transferred to the Savoy Theatre where it ran for another two years, for a total run of more than 1,000 performances.

== Subsequent productions ==
A new limited season was performed at the Adelphi Theatre in London from September 2009 to January 2010 starring Craige Els (Martin), Giles Terrera (Davis), and Louis Hoover (Sinatra). It then played for another limited season at the Wyndhams Theatre in 2011–2012 with the original cast.

By 2014, it had also played at Peacock Theatre, London Palladium and Theatre Royal Drury Lane. In December 2017 it returned to the Theatre Royal Haymarket, with Nicola Emmanuelle as Ella Fitzgerald. It closed in February 2018 followed by another UK tour which finished in June 2018.

A European tour premiered in 2004 and ran for four years playing, Germany, Austria, Italy, Spain, Norway and Denmark. The show was renamed The Ratpack Live from the Sands when it embarked on its first US Tour in 2005. It continued to tour America as part of the Broadway series for a subsequent four seasons. Another production played in Toronto's Canon Theatre. Sebastian also directed a filming of the show for PBS in America, with (Giles Terrera as Davis.

== Recordings and accolades ==
The Original West End cast recording was made early in the run at the Novello Theatre featuring the original cast.

The show was nominated for best new musical in the Whatsonstage.com Awards and for best entertainment in the 2003 Laurence Olivier Awards.
