= Bottersnikes and Gumbles =

Australian book series

- (in publication order); Bottersnikes and Gumbles; Gumbles on Guard; Gumbles in Summer; Gumbles in Trouble
- Author: SA Wakefield
- Illustrator: Desmond Digby
- Country: Australia
- Genre: Children's Literature
- No. of books: 4

Bottersnikes and Gumbles are fictitious creatures in a series of children's books by Australian writer S. A. Wakefield and illustrator Desmond Digby. Four books were published between 1967 and 1989. The series is considered a classic of Australian children's literature and has sold more than 500,000 copies worldwide. A television adaptation of the same name has aired on Netflix and terrestrial television in 2015 and 2016.

== Plot summary ==
Set in the landscape of the Australian bush the stories recount a series of conflicts between the lazy, destructive Bottersnikes and good-natured, hardworking Gumbles. Inspiration for the series came from the emerging environmental movement. The two species were intended to represent opposing attitudes towards the environment; those who destroy the bush, and those who clean it up. These themes however are diffused by the series' humour, absurdity, playful language and its sense of the ridiculous.

== Media ==
Wakefield wrote four books about the Bottersnikes and Gumbles:

- Bottersnikes and Gumbles (1967)
- Gumbles on Guard (1975)
- Gumbles in Summer (1979)
- Gumbles in Trouble (1989)

In 1996 the four books were reissued in an omnibus volume under the title The Complete Tales of Bottersnikes and Gumbles.

== Themes ==
While the books consist of light-hearted children's stories, there is a strong environmental message, mostly about the damage done to the Bush by littering. Wakefield also worked in some satire of more adult concepts: Gumbles in Summer deals with politics - especially far-fetched promises, election campaigning and vote-winning - through an election held to replace the King of the Bottersnikes when he got killed by food poisoning, while in Gumbles in Trouble, Chank the Bottersnike creates a newspaper, leading to critique of the media and biased reporting.

== Characters ==
=== Bottersnikes ===
Bottersnikes have green wrinkly skin, cheese-grater noses and long, pointed ears that go red when they are angry, which is most of the time. They are perhaps the laziest creatures in the world. They eat mattress stuffing (preferably barbecued) and pictures of food out of magazines, and for sweets they like rusty nails and bottle tops. The Bottersnikes' biggest fear is water, because they shrink when they get wet and have to be hung out to dry. When the Snikes capture the Gumbles, they stuff them in cans, force them to do dirty work, eat them, or put them in "The Spankler" which makes them stop stretching.

- The King – The King of the Bottersnikes, by far the fattest, meanest and almost the laziest.
- Chank – He is the King's second in command and believes he should be king and plans to destroy him.
- Weathersnike – The oldest and most learned Bottersnike. She has been predicting weather since Halley's Comet and is often blamed for the bad weather she predicts.
- Gubbo – Dull-witted but loyal, Sometimes he creates Machines to please The King or to trap Gumbles.
- Smiggles – The only 'snike whose dreams become solid. Whatever he dreams of something they appear a shade of purple and they are sometimes harmless.
- Glob – The most cunning but idiotic Bottersnike. He's the one who often thinks up ideas, especially catching Gumbles.
- Snorg – Is the laziest Bottersnike. Proudly she's the only one who can go to sleep hanging upside down. She is partnered by Glob and they usually blame each other.

=== Gumbles ===
Gumbles are the most friendly and cheerful creatures in the bush and can be squashed into any shape without being hurt, although when flattened or "spanked" out completely they cannot regain their own shapes without help. They are hopeless when they get the giggles.

- Tink – A Gumble with very good ideas. Each time he gets an idea, a clear, bright "tink" sound comes from his head
- Bounce - The tallest, athletic and fattest Gumble. She loves to eat grubs and is easily annoyed by Tink's ideas and his plans.
- Willi – The youngest, rashest and most danger-prone Gumble. He is always been told that he's too little for dangerous things but he's a little brave.
- Happi – The oldest, most worrisome and cautious Gumble, but he likes to have fun as much as the rest.
- Toot – Has Heterochromic eyes and toots unconsciously when danger is anywhere near. Although he only communicates by tooting, everyone can understand him.
- Float – A sweet, loving Gumble who likes to fly by blowing herself up like a balloon, she is also a daydreamer and believes in fairy tales.
- Merri – The blue haired energetic twin brother of Jolli. His singing is beautiful only to Snikes.
- Jolli – The purple haired joyful twin sister of Merri. Her singing is beautiful only to Snikes.
- Sammi Wammi - The one who has been in space for years and managed to fly into space the first.

== Television series ==
An animated television series, Bottersnikes and Gumbles, was in development as early as 2012 by Cheeky Little Media. In early 2015, the streaming video service Netflix announced it had acquired the rights to the series and was released as 52 eleven-minute episodes. It later aired on the Seven Network in Australia from December 2015 and on CBBC in the UK in 2016. The cast includes Richard Grieve, Jeff Rawle, Kathryn Drysdale and Miriam Margolyes. It was released on Netflix in North America on 19 August 2016. It was re-dubbed with American accents.
