= Desmond Digby =

New Zealand painter, stage designer and illustrator

Desmond Ward Digby (4 January 1933 – 10 April 2015) was a New Zealand-born Australian stage designer, painter and illustrator of children's books.

== Early life ==
Born in Auckland in 1933, Digby was educated at Mount Albert Grammar School from 1946 to 1950. He then studied at the Elam School of Fine Arts and joined the New Zealand Players as a stage designer after graduation. In 1955 he was awarded a scholarship to study theatre in London at the Slade School of Art. He moved to Australia in 1959.

== Career ==
Digby worked as a set and costume designer with Opera Australia, the Australian Ballet and the Elizabethan Trust Opera. He produced a head-dress worn by Marilyn Monroe in the 1957 film The Prince and the Showgirl.

As an illustrator, he won the 1971 picture book of the year award from the Children's Book Council of Australia, as well as the Critici in Erba Prize for illustration, for his 1970 illustrated version of Banjo Paterson's Waltzing Matilda. Between 1967 and 1989 he provided the illustrations for the series of children's books Bottersnikes and Gumbles written by Sam Wakefield. He also designed covers for novels by Nobel laureate Patrick White, with whom he was close friends.

Painted works by Digby are held by most of the major Australian galleries.
