= Mad House (play) =

2022 play by Theresa Rebeck

- Written by: Theresa Rebeck
- Original language: English
- Genre: Dark Comedy

Premiere
- Date premiered: 26 June 2022
- Place premiered: Ambassadors Theatre

Mad House is a 2022 play by Theresa Rebeck.

== Production ==
Mad House had its premiere production at the Ambassadors Theatre in the West End, with an opening night on 26 June 2022, following previews from 15 June. It played a limited run to 4 September 2022. Casting for the production featured David Harbour as Michael, Bill Pullman as Daniel, Akiya Henry as Lillian, Hanako Footman as Devon, Sinead Matthews as Pam, Charlie Oscar as Skylar and Stephen Wight as Nedward.

== Premise ==
In rural Pennsylvania, Michael struggles to look after his dying tyrannical father, Daniel. A hospice nurse Lillian arrives, and helps the abusive Daniel and agitated Michael who had had a history of hospitalization owing to mental health issues with calm competence. However, Michael's brother Nedword and dominant sister Pam soon unexpectedly turn up, determined not to lose out on inheritance.

== Cast and characters ==
Character	2022 West End
Michael	David Harbour
Daniel	Bill Pullman
Devon	Hanako Footman
Lillian	Akiya Henry
Pam	Sinead Matthews
Skylar	Charlie Oscar
Nedward	Stephen Wight
