= Stephen Keeling =

British composer and musician

Stephen Keeling is a British composer and musician who works predominantly in musical theatre.

== Biographical details ==
Born in 1966 in Staffordshire, England, he trained at Goldsmiths College, University of London, gaining an honours degree in music. In 1990 he was chosen by Sir Cameron Mackintosh to be one of 12 writers to study with Stephen Sondheim during the latter's year-long tenure at Oxford University as the Visiting Professor of Contemporary Theatre.

== Notable works ==
During his time with Stephen Sondheim at Oxford, he composed the music for Maddie (book and lyrics by Shaun McKenna and Steven Dexter), which was subsequently workshopped at the Royal National Theatre Studio before receiving its first full production at the Salisbury Playhouse. The production then transferred to the Lyric Theatre, Shaftesbury Avenue in London's West End in 1997, produced by Kenny Wax Productions. In 2023, Maddie was performed in New York, winning Best Score at the New York Theater Festival awards.

He was the co-composer, along with Laurence O'Keefe, for La Cava (book by Dana Broccoli, lyrics by John Claflin), which transferred from the Churchill Theatre, Bromley to the Victoria Palace Theatre, London in 2000 and then later transferred to the Piccadilly Theatre in the West End of London.

He composed the music for a musical adaptation of Heidi (book and lyrics by Shaun McKenna), which combines the story of Johanna Spyri’s first Heidi novel with the life of the author. Heidi opened in Switzerland in 2005.

In 2007 a sequel, Heidi and Johanna (intertwining the second Heidi novel with the final years of Johanna Spyri’s life and ending with her death), was nominated for a Prix Walo award.

Stephen Keeling has also composed the music for My Father’s Son, a musical set in nineteenth century Sheffield and based loosely on Shakespeare's Hamlet (book and lyrics by Stephen Clark, directed by Steven Dexter at the Crucible Theatre, Sheffield and the Lilian Baylis Theatre, Sadler’s Wells). For children he has composed The Last Wave, a musical about the Children's Crusade (book and lyrics by Peter Spafford) and written the music for a musical adaptation of The Amazing Mr. Blunden (book and lyrics by Edward Hardy).

He wrote the music for a sequel to Peter Pan, called The Return of Peter Pan (book and lyrics by Shaun McKenna), which premiered at the Theater Regensburg, Germany, in November 2023.

== Other ==
Keeling was a founding member of the Mercury Workshop, which merged with the New Musicals Alliance to become MMD, a UK-based organisation developing new musical theatre.

In 1997, he appeared, together with Shaun McKenna, on BBC Radio 2's In Company With Sondheim in an edition devoted to Maddie.
