= Steven Dexter =

South African theatre director and writer

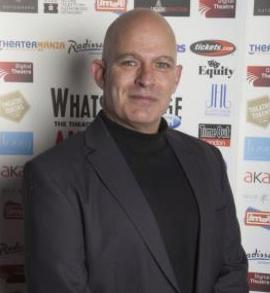
- Dexter in 2012
- Born: Steven Dexter; 26 August 1962 (age 64); South Africa
- Education: London Academy of Music and Dramatic Art, London
- Occupation: Theatre Director
- Years active: 1983–present

Steven Dexter (born August 26, 1962) is a theatre director and writer.

== Early life ==
Dexter was born in South Africa, then he moved to London in 1984 and studied at the London Academy of Music and Dramatic Art.

== West End productions ==
In 2003 he directed both Peter Pan and The Pirates of Penzance, playing in repertoire at the Savoy Theatre, London.

His production of La Cava (book by Dana Broccoli, lyrics by John Claflin and Shaun McKenna, music by Laurence O'Keefe and Stephen Keeling) transferred from the Churchill Theatre, Bromley to the Victoria Palace Theatre, London, in 2000, transferring to the Piccadilly Theatre in 2001.

In October 2012 his production of Loserville transferred to the Garrick Theatre, London, in a co-production between Kevin Wallace Productions, West Yorkshire Playhouse, TC Beech and Youth Music Theatre UK (now British Youth Music Theatre).

As a book writer, he co-wrote Maddie, (with Shaun McKenna, music by Stephen Keeling), produced by Kenny Wax Productions, which transferred to the Lyric Theatre, Shaftesbury Avenue in 1997 and he directed Romance / Romance, which transferred to the Gielgud Theatre, London, in the same year.

== Other productions ==
He directed the world premiere and 2007 revival of the Olivier Award winning musical Honk! at the Watermill Theatre, Newbury. In Derby he directed the world premiere of The Pros, The Cons and a Screw in 2009. Also in 2009, he directed the world premiere of a new musical, Loserville: The Musical for Youth Music Theatre UK, written by James Bourne and Elliot Davis.

He directed a reimagined, 6 hander production of Pippin at a pop up theatre called the Garden Theatre (2020) which transferred to the Charing Cross Theatre with a cast of 8 by request of Stephen Schwartz in 2021.

Dexter worked extensively for the Habima Theatre, the Israeli National Theatre, directing Honk! (2000), Mary-Lou (2002), The Full Monty (2003), Shirley Valentine (2005) and High School Musical (2008). In Singapore for the Singapore Repertory Company (SRT) he directed Forbidden City: Portrait of An Empress (2002) (a collaboration with Stephen Clark and Dick Lee),Fried Rice Paradise (2010). and The LKY Musical which had runs in 2015 and 2022 at the Marina Bay Sands Theatre. It also won 3 Straits Times Life Awards including Best Production.
