= Muse of Fire =

Novella by Dan Simmons

- Hardcover first edition
- Author: Dan Simmons
- Language: English
- Genre: Science fiction
- Publisher: Subterranean Press
- Publication date: October 28, 2008
- Publication place: United States
- Media type: Print (hardback & paperback)
- Pages: 100 (first edition, hardback)
- ISBN: 978-1596061811 (first edition, hardback)
- OCLC: 276486331

Muse of Fire is a science fiction novella by Dan Simmons. It is about a group of Shakespearean actors, the "Earth's Men", in the far future where humans are a minor conquered species, spread across the stars in subservient roles. The narrator, one of the actors, suspects the alien masters of the galaxy are deciding the fate of humanity based on the performances.

Muse of Fire was originally published in 2007, in the anthology The New Space Opera, and standalone by Subterranean Press in 2008.

Muse of Fire was a finalist for the 2008 Locus Awards in the Best Novella category.

== Title source ==
The title comes from William Shakespeare's Henry V (Prologue, 1–4):

O for a Muse of fire, that would ascend
The brightest heaven of invention,
A kingdom for a stage, princes to act
And monarchs to behold the swelling scene!

In the novella, Muse of Fire is the name of the "Earth's Men" ship.

== Reception ==
Ray Olson of Booklist wrote: "Simmons' novella ... is an exceptionally artful religious legend of the far future, and quite special."

Publishers Weekly wrote: "This finely crafted novella is a perfect example of Simmons's many strengths." According to Dorman T. Shindler of The Denver Post: "The whole thing feels more like a blueprint for a novel rather than a proper piece of short fiction."
