= La Cava (musical) =

La Cava is a musical with a book by Dana Broccoli, lyrics by John Claflin and Laurence O'Keefe, additional lyrics by Shaun McKenna and music by O'Keefe and Stephen Keeling.

Based on Broccoli's novel Florinda, its title is derived not from the sparkling wine but for the Spanish word for a scarlet woman. The plot is based on the legend of Florinda la Cava, daughter of Julian, Count of Ceuta, whose love triangle involving King Roderic sets a massive war in motion. In the 8th century, Roderic was the last ruler of Visigothic Spain and was overthrown by the Moorish invasion.

The show was originally presented at UCLA's Freud Playhouse from the 1–23 July 1995 under its original title 'Florinda', starring Julie Heron as the title character and directed by David Galligan. At this point in the show's development, the music and lyrics were by O'Keefe and Claflin only.

Directed by Steven Dexter with "striking choreography" by Mitch Sebastian, the West End production opened on 8 June 2000 at the Victoria Palace Theatre, where it ran for six weeks before transferring to the Piccadilly Theatre. It remained there until closing on 3 February 2001. The original cast included Oliver Tobias as King Roderic, Julie-Alanah Brighten as Florinda, Marilyn Cutts as the Queen, Paul Keating as her servant Agon, Daniel Redmond as Florinda's Moorish lover, David Bardsley as Florinda's father, Louisa McCarthy as Florinda's friend at court, and Patrick Romer as the evil, Jew-hating Archbishop.

Reviews were mixed. Sarah Hemming of The Financial Times described it as "not dislikeable, just rather relentless . . . Everything about La Cava is huge: big themes, grand passions, epic story, towering set, soaring score. It is like being swallowed up by a historical romance." In CurtainUp London, Lizzie Loveridge wrote, "It is an effervescent mix of stars with sex appeal, original choreography, sweet music, tongue in cheek lyrics, and high drama." David Benedict of The Times observed, "Laurence O'Keefe and Stephen Keeling's score has size, energy, and even a bit of soul." The Daily Telegraph review began, "Another day, another doomed musical. Yet of all the turkeys that have arrived on our stages recently, La Cava is the one I've enjoyed most." The review went on to say "Although the bovine stupidity of producers continue to baffle me. The backers of this show would have had a better chance of getting their money back if they had chucked it into the Thames."

== Synopsis ==
Florinda Espatorias is the daughter of the Spanish general who is governor of Ceuta in North Africa in the early 8th century. When the city is threatened by Moorish invasion, she is sent away to be schooled in the womanly arts in the court of King Roderic in Toledo, Spain. This takes her away from her childhood sweetheart and secret lover, Somal, the son of a Moorish rebel leader. She has also been promised in marriage to an army officer.

King Roderic has shunned his queen, Exilona, because of her apparent infidelity while he was away at war. He is attracted to Florinda immediately upon meeting her. Florinda's lover is killed, almost accidentally, by Roderic's soldiers. Florinda, heart-broken, is spurred on by Exilona's loyal servant Agon to seek revenge by accusing Roderic of rape. Slowly, however, Roderic wins her heart, and she discovers that she is carrying his child. In regret, she tries to send a messenger to redact her claim. The messenger is killed, however, and her father joins with the Moorish army to defend her honor, and massive bloodshed ensues.

== Song list ==
Act I

- I Am Proud to Call Mine
- I Will Hold You
- Little Girl
- My Dream Came True - I & II
- Within These Walls
- The Bazaar
- Why Did I Kiss Her?
- First Kiss
- Death of Somal
- A Woman's Hands
- The Seduction

Act II

- Vengeance
- Montage
- Say Goodbye
- Berber Dance
- What Would You Do For Your Child?
- Theo's Stars/The Wedding
- La Cava
- I Fall With You
- Here I Am
- I Stayed Behind/The Battle
- Finale Ultimio
