= S. A. Wakefield =

Australian writer

- Born: Sydney Alexander Wakefield; May 13, 1927; Australia
- Died: August 22, 2009 (aged 82)
- Occupation: Writer
- Years active: 1960s–1990s
- Notable work: Bottersnikes and Gumbles series

Sydney "Sam" Alexander Wakefield (13 May 1927 - 22 August 2009) was an Australian writer who was best known for the Bottersnikes and Gumbles series of children's books.

== Biography ==
Sydney Wakefield was born in Australia to English immigrant parents on 13 May 1927. In 1945 he enlisted and was commissioned into the 2nd Punjab Regiment. After the end of World War II he joined his father who had an orchard Gosford, New South Wales. After studying Social Studies at Sydney University (1949–50), he married (1953), and started a farm at Kariong, New South Wales.

He wrote short stories for children about "Bottersnikes and Gumbles", which contain a mixture of absurdity, humour, puns, as well as carrying an environmental message.

== Works ==
Wakefield wrote four books about the Bottersnikes and Gumbles:

- Wakefield, S.A.; Digby, Desmond (1967), Bottersnikes and Gumbles, Collins : Sydney , 80pp
- Wakefield, S.A.; Digby, Desmond (1975), Gumbles on Guard, Collins : Sydney/London, ISBN 0001850067 , 88pp
- Wakefield, S.A.; Digby, Desmond (1979), Gumbles in Summer, Collins : Australia, ISBN 0001843672 , 96pp
- Wakefield, S.A.; Digby, Desmond (1989), Gumbles in Trouble, Sydney : Collins Australia in association with Anne Ingram Books, ISBN 0732273013 , 84pp

Other

- Wakefield, S.A. (1990), Captain Deadlight's Treasure, Australia: Collins; 1st Australian Edition, ISBN 978-0207158353

In 1996 the four books were reissued in an omnibus volume under the title The Complete Tales of Bottersnikes and Gumbles.
