= The Meaning of Zong =

Stage play

The Meaning of Zong is a play by Giles Terera about the massacre on board the slave ship Zong, its impact on the anti-slavery movement and its importance in the modern world. The play was first performed in Bristol, England in 2022.

== Setting ==
The main locations are a present-day bookshop, London's Westminster Hall in 1783, and the slave ship Zong sailing from West Africa to Jamaica in 1781.

== Characters ==
- Olaudah Equiano, also known as Gustavus Vassa, a barber and abolitionist
- Granville Sharp, a music teacher and abolitionist
- Ottobah Cugoano, an abolitionist
- Annie Greenwood, a teacher and shorthand writer
- Ama, Riba and Joyi, women from West Africa who are enslaved on the Zong
- James Kelsall, first mate of the Zong
- Robert Stubbs, a passenger on the Zong and former slave ship captain
- William Woodfall, a publisher
- Lord Mansfield, Lord Chief Justice of Great Britain
- Sir John Lee and Arthur Pigott, lawyers

== Synopsis ==
The play opens with an argument about how to categorise a book on slavery. The abolitionist Olaudah Equiano connects this to the shocking story of the slave ship Zong, whose crew threw 132 slaves overboard, ostensibly to avoid a water shortage, and whose owners then claimed insurance for their loss. When the insurers appeal, Equiano persuades the abolitionist movement to bring a criminal prosecution, documenting the insurance trial as evidence. Equiano feels an empathetic connection with the experience of three women enslaved aboard the Zong, and in particular with the one who survived after being thrown into the sea. He is forced to confront his own personal journey, and in so doing brings the story back to the audience in the present day.

== Interpretation ==
The play follows an African tradition of storytelling, in which the writer and performer are one and the same and engage the audience directly. In the opening production, the writer Giles Terera played the part of Equiano, while the onstage musical director Sidiki Dembele used traditional instruments and involved both cast and audience.

The play is based on actual historical events and draws on the records of the court case and the book written by Equiano, but it demonstrates their close connection to modern society, and counterbalances the courtroom drama by telling the story of the enslaved Africans, "a theatrical equivalent of the modern victim statement".

Terera explained his aims:

I did so much research about this period, but these huge holes in history and our unwillingness to talk about this subject only adds to keeping this history invisible. So, for me, it was about finding a way to tell this story so that the audience could listen to it, hear it, see it, without fear.

Terera recognised the dramatic potential in a small detail in one of the documents concerning a person who was thrown overboard yet managed to grab a rope and pull themselves back onto the ship. "That's where I started, with that character, because that was someone I wanted to see a play about."

Through inspirational characters, the play became "a story of our time, celebrating the power of the human spirit against adversity, and the journey of our past to understand our place in the world". As Equiano says in the play, "Why a thing happens is not the question, rather what we do when a thing happens."

== Development ==
The play was commissioned by the Bristol Old Vic and the National Theatre, and presented in a staged reading in 2018. During the COVID-19 pandemic, the planned 2020 production was reimagined as a radio play on BBC Radio 3.

== Productions ==
The play was first staged in April 2022 at the Bristol Old Vic, directed by Terera and Tom Morris, with an ensemble cast including Terera, and joined onstage by composer and musical director Sidiki Dembele. It toured to the Royal Lyceum Theatre Edinburgh and the Liverpool Playhouse.

== Critical reception ==
The Guardian praised the "richly theatrical" production, which "refrains from didacticism and easy metaphors". The Bristol Post described it as "a powerful story that feels particularly relevant right now." The Scotsman praised the "magnificent shifting set", the ensemble cast and the onstage musical director. The Wirral Globe praised "teamwork of the highest order".
