= Honk! =

British musical

- The Musical
- Music: George Stiles
- Lyrics: Anthony Drewe
- Book: Anthony Drewe
- Basis: "The Ugly Duckling" story by Hans Christian Andersen
- Productions: 1993 Newbury; 1999 West End; 2019 UK tour
- Awards: Laurence Olivier Award for Best New Musical

Honk! is a musical adaptation of the 1843 Hans Christian Andersen story The Ugly Duckling, incorporating a message of tolerance. The book and lyrics are by Anthony Drewe and music is by George Stiles (of the British songwriting duo Stiles and Drewe). The musical is set in the countryside and features Ugly – a cygnet who is mistaken as an ugly duckling upon falling into his mother's nest and is rejected by everyone but Ida (his mother), a sly tomcat who only befriends him out of hunger, and several other barnyard characters.

The musical opened at the Watermill Theatre in England in 1993. The West End production opened in 1999 and won the 2000 Laurence Olivier Award for Best New Musical

The show is frequently produced by schools, as well as regional and community theatre groups in Britain, the U.S. and Canada.

== Production history ==
Newbury, England

A version of Honk! opened in 1993 at The Watermill Theatre in Newbury, England, originally titled The Ugly Duckling or the Aesthetically Challenged Farmyard Fowl, with Craig Purnell creating the titular character. It returned to the Watermill Theatre in December 2007. Both productions were directed by Steven Dexter.

Scarborough, England

The original production of Honk! officially opened in 1997, directed by Julia McKenzie, at the Stephen Joseph Theatre in Scarborough, England.

West End

The West End production opened on 11 December 1999 at The Royal National Theatre in London and won the 2000 Olivier Award for Best New Musical. In Ireland the Dublin Premiere of the show received a nomination for Best Show in 2003 from the Association of Irish Musicals and came in second place in the Waterford International Festival of Light Opera for 2004.

Royal National Tour

The production toured to Bath Theatre Royal June 12–17, 2001. The production starred Tracie Bennett and Clive Rowe

Nyack

Honk! made its U.S. premiere at the Helen Hayes Performing Arts Center (since 2006 known as Riverspace Arts in Nyack) in Nyack, New York in February 2000. Although somewhat well received, the Nyack production had a rough start. Just a week before opening the show was quickly re-imagined and restaged, having replaced a key member of the creative team.

North Shore Music Theatre

A slightly re-written production with a script more oriented to Americans opened at the North Shore Music Theatre in the same year as the Nyack production and had the same male lead, Gavin Creel, as Ugly. The NSMT production used almost the entire original creative team from Great Britain, with an American lighting designer. In its three-week run, over 30 regional theatres from around the US were inspired to include the show in their next season. Changes included the Turkey having a fear of Thanksgiving instead of Christmas, and the first line of the song, "A Poultry Tale" being changed from "In this backwater of England" to "In our patch behind the farmhouse". This version is licensed in the United States by Music Theatre International.

2017 London Revival, Union Theatre

The 20th anniversary revival, directed by Andy Room, featured a cast of only seven, actor-musicians and was the first production to substitute the child cast for puppets. It featured some updated references in the script and was nominated for the 2017 Offie for Best Production for Young People 8+.

UK Tour, National Youth Music Theatre

In 2017, the National Youth Music Theatre toured a production of Honk the Musical around the UK to venues such as Theatre Royal, Bury St Edmunds and The Rose Theatre, Kingston.

2019 UK Tour

In 2019, an updated version of the 2017 Revival will tour the UK.

== Recordings ==
An original cast album from the Scarborough production was released in 1998. Stiles and Drewe released the original demo recording in 2008. This features Claire Moore, Joanna Riding, Clive Rowe, Jenna Russell and the writers themselves.

== Characters ==
Character(s)	Description
Ugly	The main character, who is shunned for his odd appearance.
Ida	Ugly's mother, the only one supportive of him.
Maureen	Ida's best friend who is also friends with Henrietta. A little conceited
Cat	Trying to eat Ugly, sly and cunning (a villain)
Drake	Ugly's father, a mallard who detests Ugly
The Turkey	The school's headmaster, afraid of Christmas (Thanksgiving in American version)
Ducklings	Ugly's siblings (Billy, Beaky, Downy and Fluff. Some versions include additional ducklings.)
Grace	The most distinguished duck on the lake, or so she says because of the red band on her leg
Henrietta	A neighbor, Ida's other best friend who is also friends with Maureen.
Bullfrog	A Wise-cracking, Jolly, Laid-back, Sassy, self-confident frog Who convinces Ugly that someone will love him for him.
Froglets	The bullfrog's children
Queenie*	Domesticated cat
Lowbutt*	Domesticated chicken
Greylag	Dot's husband, goose of a glittering military career
Dot	Female goose, Greylag's wife
Barnacles, Pinkfoot, Snowy	Members of the Goose Squadron
Father Swan	Father to Penny
Mother Swan	Mother to Penny
Penny	A beautiful female swan who Ugly falls in love with after saving her from a fishing line that was strangling her
Boy	(Voice only)
Girl	(Voice only)
Duckyard Animals	Various poultry, such as quail, pheasants, ducks, chickens, etc.
Farmer	(Voice only)
Fish
Jack Daw/Maggie Pie/ Jay Bird**	An 'in your face' reporter from Britain's Most Feathered
Old Woman	Owner of Queenie and Lowbutt (Voice only)

*These characters do not appear in Honk! Jr. (see below)

**The character can be male or female. Should the role be played by a female, the character will be renamed Maggie Pie. The US version is called Jay Bird rather than Jack Daw, and the TV show is renamed "America's Most Feathered".

== Plot ==
Act I

It is Spring, and Drake thinks about life on the farm. ("A Poultry Tale"). As he attempts to sneak away, Ida scolds him for neglecting their eggs that are about to hatch. Drake believes one huge egg is a turkey's egg, but Ida is doubtful. Ida expresses "The Joy of Motherhood" and is joined by her friend Maureen, when all of the "normal" eggs hatch. Drake takes the ducklings to learn to swim, leaving Ida to wait for the fifth egg to hatch ("Different" pre-reprise). It finally hatches to reveal Ugly. Ida is initially shocked but is overjoyed that the new arrival is not a turkey. As she teaches him to swim, she notices his amazing talent ("Hold Your Head Up High").

When Drake and the ducklings return, they are aghast at Ugly's appearance and, along with Maureen, Henrietta, the Turkey, and everyone else, make fun of him, while the Cat admires what a great meal he would be ("Look At Him"). As Ugly tries and fails to "quack," he realises he isn't the same as the others ("Different"). The Cat offers to be Ugly's friend and to treat him to lunch, which he happily accepts. Ugly tries to get Ida's permission, but she is too busy with the other ducklings. After Ugly leaves with the Cat, Ida realises Ugly is missing. Everyone splits up to look for him.

In his lair, the Cat is preparing to eat Ugly, who is unaware of the danger ("Play with Your Food"). Just as the Cat is about to strike, the children playing outside send a ball flying through the window, hitting the Cat and causing him to fall into the pot. Ugly thinks he is hiding and goes to find a hiding place of his own, but ends up getting "Lost". Back at the duckyard, no one can find Ugly, and they mourn him ("The Elegy"), but Ida refuses to believe he is dead. Jay Bird (or Maggie Pie), interrupts and begins to interview Ida for "Britain's Most Feathered". Ida laments about what it's like to lose one of your children ("Every Tear a Mother Cries"). Ida continues to search for Ugly, leaving her other four ducklings with Drake.

Meanwhile, Ugly comes across two military geese, Greylag and Dot, and begs for their help. They and their "squadron" of geese decide to go on a reconnaissance mission to find Ugly's home ("Wild Goose Chase"). However, there is a shoot going on in the marsh, so the Cat sneaks in and offers to help out by telling them when the shoot is over, hoping that they will leave him alone with Ugly. Greylag sees through the Cat's plan and takes him along. The Geese and the Cat head off to the shoot, which is still going on, and get shot down. Ugly, who didn't go on the mission with them, realises that the Cat is evil and had lied. Ida sets off to find Ugly, and they both vow to find each other and be reunited. ("Hold Your Head Up High" Reprise).

Act II

Ugly wanders into a house and meets Queenie and Lowbutt, a domesticated cat and chicken. They too make fun of him not only for his looks but also for not being of "their sort" ("It Takes All Sorts"). When they turn on the TV, they see Ida and Jay Bird broadcasting a missing notice for Ugly. Ugly recognises his mother and Queenie goes to call the advertised number. Just then the doorbell rings, and the Cat enters, poorly disguised as Drake. Ugly sees through the disguise, but Lowbutt believes he is actually Ugly's father. But when Queenie comes back in, the Cat falls in love. Queenie also thinks he is a duck, but she too falls in love when he removes his disguise ("Together"). Lowbutt is dismayed, so she helps Ugly to escape, leaving the Cat to decide between his meal and Queenie. He chooses to go after Ugly, leaving Lowbutt to console Queenie.

Back at the farmyard, Drake is forced into some responsibility, and, now that the ducklings are almost a year old, they are beginning to give Drake a hard time as teenagers. Ida, still searching for Ugly, comes across everyone that Ugly has met ("The Collage"). Meanwhile, Ugly finds Penny, a swan, caught in some fishing line and untangles her. Penny, knowing Ugly is a swan, invites him to migrate with her, but Ugly insists that he can't. As Penny flies away, Ugly realises he is in love with her ("Now I've Seen You"), but is sad because he believes she could never love someone as ugly as himself. Just then, a Bullfrog comes hopping by. Noticing his bad mood, he tells Ugly about how "ugliness" is just a matter of taste and that someone out there will always love you "Warts and All". The song cheers Ugly up, and the bullfrog leaves. Suddenly, a net drops on Ugly's head. A farmer has caught him for his family's Sunday roast. When the Farmer goes to get his knife, the Cat sneaks back onstage and offers a deal; he will lead Ugly back to the farm, but Ugly has to promise to be the Cat's lunch. Ugly agrees, and both of them head back to the farmyard.

On the way, the two get caught in a blizzard and freeze ("The Blizzard"). Ida unfortunately has gotten caught in it as well. Ida notices them and believes Ugly is dead. Penny and her family come to Ida and tell her to cry, that her tears of hope will save Ugly. Soon Ugly wakes up and realises he is not a duck, but a swan, then reunites with his mother ("Transformation"). Penny recognises that Ugly is the one who saved her earlier and the two confess their love to each other. The swans invite Ugly to come learn their ways. Although Ugly wants to stay with Ida, she insists that he go with the swans. As they fly off, Ida sings of how Ugly was different, but Ugly suddenly reappears with Penny, as they have decided to stay with Ida. Just before they leave, Ugly frees the Cat, who has remained frozen this entire time. As the Cat notices Ugly is not a duck but a swan, he goes insane before running away in defeat ("Melting Moggy").

Ugly, Penny and Ida return to the lake; everyone loves Ugly now that he is a swan. They ask for his forgiveness for making fun of him ("Look At Him" Reprise). Ugly happily accepts their apology and introduces Penny. Grace decides to relinquish the Red Band, now the Cygnet Ring, to Ugly, dubbing him "the finest bird on the lake".

== Musical numbers ==
Act I

- "A Poultry Tale" - Drake, Ida, Cat, Henrietta, Maureen, Turkey, Grace, Ensemble
- "The Joy of Motherhood" - Ida, Maureen
- "Different" (pre-reprise) - Ida
- "Hold Your Head up High" - Ida, Ugly, Fish (Ensemble)
- "Look at Him" - Ida, Drake, Ugly, Maureen, Henrietta, Turkey, Ducklings, Cat, Grace, Ensemble
- "Different" - Ugly
- "Play With your Food" - Cat, Ugly
- "Lost" - Ugly^
- "The Elegy" - Ensemble^
- "Every Tear A Mother Cries" - Ida
- "The Wild Goose Chase" - Greylag, Dot, Cat, Ugly, Geese (Ensemble)
- "Hold Your Head Up High" (Reprise) - Ida, Ugly^

Act II

- "It Takes All Sorts" - Queenie, Lowbutt^
- "Together" - Cat, Queenie, Lowbutt^
- "The Collage" - Drake, Ida, Ensemble^
- "Now I've Seen You" - Ugly^
- "Warts and All" - Bullfrog, Ugly, Froglets (Ensemble)
- "The Blizzard" - Ensemble, Ugly, Cat
- "Transformation" - Ugly, Ida, Penny
- "Melting Moggy" - Cat^
- "Look At Him" (Reprise) - Ensemble
- "Warts And All" (Reprise) - Ensemble

^These songs do not appear in Honk! Jr.

== Honk! Jr. ==
A junior version of Honk! has been made for younger audiences. There are slight changes in Honk! Jr., notably the Cat could be played by either a male or female. Because of this, the characters Queenie and Lowbutt do not appear in this version, nor do the songs "It Takes All Sorts" and "Together". Certain songs are cut (see the song list above), whilst others, such as "Look At Him" are shortened with the lyrics slightly changed. The lyrics in "Warts and All" were also changed slightly to appeal to younger audiences. "The Wild Goose Chase", a song that normally appears at the end of the first act, opens Act 2 to fill the gap normally filled by Queenie and Lowbutt.
