= Unwell Women =

Non-fiction book by Elinor Cleghorn

Unwell Women: A Journey Through Medicine and Myth in a Man-Made World
- First edition (UK)
- Author: Elinor Cleghorn
- Genre: Non-fiction
- Published: 2021
- Publisher: Weidenfeld & Nicolson (UK – 2021); Dutton (US – 2021)
- ISBN: 978-0-593-18295-6

Unwell Women: A Journey Through Medicine and Myth in a Man-Made World is a 2021 non-fiction book by Elinor Cleghorn. Cleghorn provides a cultural history of the impacts of misogyny on western medicine and western medical practice.

== Summary ==
In Unwell Women, British cultural historian Cleghorn provides a history of the ways in which western medicine has abused and dismissed women and women's health issues. The book's feminist critiques focus largely on medical practice in the United States and United Kingdom. Cleghorn's research covers over 2000 years, beginning with Hippocrates and continuing to 21st-century medicine. The book has eighteen chapters over three parts: Ancient Greece–Nineteenth Century, Late-Nineteenth Century–1940s, and 1945–present.

== Development ==
Cleghorn was diagnosed with systemic lupus erythematosus in 2010, following her second pregnancy, after dealing with symptoms for more than ten years. This experience led her to research lupus in the 19th-century which gave her insight into the medical treatment and mistreatment of women's pain. Cleghorn's experiences with lupus are chronicled in Unwell Women.
