= Drama Desk Award for Outstanding Projection Design =

American theatre award

- Awarded for: Outstanding projection Design
- Location: New York City
- Country: United States
- Presented by: Drama Desk
- First award: 2008
- Currently held by: Tal Yarden, Oedipus (2026)
- Website: dramadesk.org

The Drama Desk Award for Outstanding Projection Design is an annual award presented by Drama Desk in recognition of achievements in the theatre across collective Broadway, off-Broadway and off-off-Broadway productions in New York City.

The category was added for the 2008-2009 ceremony but was not subsequently included until the 2015-2016 season.

Finn Ross holds the record for most wins in the category, with three, followed closely by Peter Nigrini and Aaron Rhyne with two each. Nigrini holds the record for most nominations, with six, followed by Finn Ross with four.

== Winners and nominees ==
Key

and bold indicates the winner.

=== 2000s ===
Year	Designer	Production	Ref.
2008
2008	**Timothy Bird & The Knifedge Creative Network**	**Sunday in the Park with George**	
2008	Paul Barritt	Between the Devil and the Deep Blue Sea	
2008	Zachary Borovay	A Catered Affair	
2008	Jim Findlay & Jeff Sugg	The Slug Bearers of Karol Island	
2008	Lorna Heavey	Macbeth	
2008	Tal Yarden	The Misanthrope	
2009	N/A		

=== 2010s ===
Year	Designer	Production	Ref.
2010-2012	N/A		
2013
2013	**Peter Nigrini**	**Here Lies Love**	
2013	Jon Driscoll	Chaplin: The Musical	
2013	Wendall K. Harrington	Old Hats	
2013	Darrel Maloney	Checkers	
2013	Pedro Pires	Cirque du Soleil: Totem	
2013	Aaron Rhyne	Wild With Happy	
2014
2014	**Aaron Rhyne**	**A Gentleman's Guide to Love and Murder**	
2014	Robert Massicotte and Alexis Laurence	Cirkopolis	
2014	Sven Ortel	A Midsummer Night's Dream	
2014	Shawn Sagady	All The Way	
2014	Austin Switser	Sontag: Reborn	
2014	Ben Rubin	Arguendo	
2015
2015	**Finn Ross**	**The Curious Incident of the Dog in the Night-Time**	
2015	59 Productions	An American in Paris	
2015	Roger Hanna & Price Johnston	Donogoo	
2015	Darrel Maloney	Found	
2015	Peter Nigrini	Our Lady of Kibeho	
2015	Austin Zwitser	Big Love	
2016
2016	**Finn Ross**	**American Psycho**	
2016	Nicholas Hussong	These Paper Bullets!	
2016	Darrel Maloney	Tappin’ Thru Life	
2016	Peter Nigrini	Dear Evan Hansen	
2016	Tal Yarden	Lazarus	
2017
2017	**Aaron Rhyne**	**Anastasia**	
2017	Reid Farrington	CasablancaBox	
2017	Elaine J. McCarthy	Notes from the Field	
2017	Jared Mezzocchi	Vietgone	
2017	John Narun	Gorey: The Secret Lives of Edward	
2018
2018	**Finn Ross and Ash J. Woodward**	**Harry Potter and the Cursed Child**	
2018	David Bengali	Van Gogh’s Ear, Ensemble for the Romantic Century	
2018	Andrezj Goulding	People, Places & Things, National Theatre/St. Ann’s Warehouse/Bryan Singer Productions/Headlong	
2018	Peter Nigrini	SpongeBob SquarePants	
2018	Finn Ross and Adam Young	Mean Girls	
2019
2019	**Peter England**	**King Kong**	
2019	Katherine Freer	By the Way, Meet Vera Stark	
2019	Luke Halls	The Lehman Trilogy	
2019	Alex Basco Koch	Be More Chill	
2019	Peter Nigrini	Beetlejuice	
2019	Joshua Thorson	Rodgers & Hammerstein's Oklahoma!	

=== 2020s ===
Year	Designer	Production	Ref.
2020
2020	**Luke Halls**	**West Side Story**	
2020	David Bengali	Einstein's Dreams	
2020	Julia Frey	Medea	
2020	Lisa Renkel and POSSIBLE	Emojiland	
2020	Hannah Wasileski	Fires in the Mirror	
2021	No awards: New York theatres shuttered, March 2020 to September 2021, due to the COVID-19 pandemic in New York City		
2022
2022	**59 Productions**	**Flying Over Sunset**	
2022	David Bengali	Twilight: Los Angeles, 1992	
2022	Stefania Bulbarella and Alex Basco Koch	Space Dogs	
2022	Shawn Duan	The Chinese Lady	
2022	Sven Ortel	Thoughts of a Colored Man	
2023
2023	**Andrzej Goulding**	**Life of Pi**	
2023	Simon Baker	Wuthering Heights	
2023	Caite Hevner	Between the Lines	
2023	Josh Higgason	White Girl in Danger	
2023	Nicholas Hussong	On That Day in Amsterdam	
2023	Johnny Moreno	Public Obsceneties	
2024	**Peter Nigrini**	**Hell's Kitchen**	
2024	Eric Dunlap	Our Class	
2024	Jared Mezzocchi	Russian Troll Farm: A Workplace Comedy	
2024	Olivia Sebesky	Melissa Etheridge: My Window	
2024	Jeanette Oi-Suk Yew	The Connector	
2025
2025	**David Bergman**	**The Picture of Dorian Gray**	
2025	Nathan Amzi and Joe Ransom	Sunset Blvd.	
2025	Jake Barton	McNeal	
2025	Jesse Garrison	The 7th Voyage of Egon Tichy [redux]	
2025	Hana S. Kim	Redwood	
2026
2026	**Tal Yarden**	**Oedipus**	
2026	David Bengali	My Joy is Heavy	
2026	Akhila Krishnan	Kyoto	
2026	Johnny Moreno	Mexodus	

== Multiple wins ==
3 wins

- Finn Ross

2 wins

- Peter Nigrini
- Aaron Rhyne

== Multiple nominations ==
6 nominations

- Peter Nigrini

4 nominations

- Finn Ross
- David Bengali

3 nominations

- Darrel Maloney
- Aaron Rhyne
- Tal Yarden

2 nominations

- Sven Ortel
- 59 Productions
- Nicholas Hussong
- Jared Mezzocchi
- Luke Halls
- Alex Basco Koch
