= Finn Ross =

Scottish video designer (born 1982)

Finn Ross (born 1982) is a Scottish video designer working internationally. He works primarily on stage productions in the London's West End and on Broadway in the USA. He has also worked extensively in opera throughout Europe and has collaborated with designers like Es Devlin and theatre companies like Complicité. Ross has won a Tony Award and two Olivier Awards.

== Early life and education ==
Ross was born and raised in Glen Tanar, Aberdeenshire. He was educated at Aboyne Academy where he became interested in theatre thanks to his drama teacher, Yevonne Wheeler. He also spent time at The Scottish Youth Theatre.

He studied at Central School of Speech and Drama in London from 2000 to 2003 earning a Bachelor of Arts degree in Theatre Practise.

== Career ==
Ross began his career in 2005 being mentored by Dick Straker and Sven Ortel of the video design collective Mesmer, working as an associate on many of their productions and later designing for them.

Notable work in Broadway and the West End includes Chimerica, Curious Incident of the Dog in the Night Time, Betrayal, American Psycho, Harry Potter and the Cursed Child, Frozen, Mean Girls, Bat Out of Hell, Top Girls & The Tempest at the RSC.

Ross has design many opera productions, especially at the ENO and has been cited as part of the movement of Video designers who helped develop the form to maturity. Notable work in opera includes The Magic Flute for DNO and ENO, The Damnation of Faust with Terry Gilliam at The ENO, The Death of Klinghoffer for ENO and The Met and The Rise and Fall of the City of Mahagonny at the ROH and Turn of the Screw, Beatrice & Benedict and Pearl Fishers & La Traviata at Theatre an der Wein.

He has also had collaborations with British Theatre director Simon McBurney and his company Complicité, designing 4 shows over a 10-year period.

Ross is also a Design Champion of the V&A Dundee.

In 2015 he formed FRAY Studio in Partnership With Adam Young.

In December 2019 he was made an Honorary Fellow of the Royal Central School of Speech and Drama

== Awards and nominations ==
Year	Award	Category	Work	Result
2013	Olivier Award	Best Set Design	Curious Incident of the dog in the Night-Time	Won
2014	Olivier Award	Best Lighting Design	Chimerica	Won
2015	Drama Desk Award	Outstanding Projection Design	Curious Incident of the Dog in the Night Time	Won
2015	Tony Award	Best Scenic Design in a Play	Curious Incident of the Dog in the Night Time	Won
2016	Outer Critics Circle Award	Outstanding Projection Design	American Psycho	Won
2016	Drama Desk Award	Outstanding Projection Design	American Psycho	Won
2016	Tony Award	Best Scenic Design of a Musical	American Psycho	Nominated
2017	What's on Stage Awards	Best Video Design	The Tempest	Nominated
2017	What's on Stage Awards	Best Video Design	Harry Potter and the Cursed Child (with Ash Woodward)	Won
2017	Los Angeles Drama Critics Circle	CGI/Video Design	Curious Incident of the Dog in the Night Time	Won
2018	Tony Award	Best Scenic Design of a Musical	Mean Girls (with Adam Young)	Nominated
2018	Outer Critics Circle Award	Outstanding Projection Design	Into The Body of the World	Nominated
2018	Outer Critics Circle Award	Outstanding Projection Design	Frozen	Nominated
2018	Outer Critics Circle Award	Outstanding Projection Design	Mean Girls (with Adam Young)	Nominated
2018	Outer Critics Circle Award	Outstanding Projection Design	Harry Potter and the Cursed Child (with Ash Woodward)	Won
2018	Drama Desk Award	Outstanding Projection Design	Mean Girls (with Adam Young)	Nominated
2018	Drama Desk Award	Outstanding Projection Design	Harry Potter and the Cursed Child (with Ash Woodward)	Won
2018	Knight of Illumination Awards	Projection Design	Mean Girls (with Adam Young)	Won
2022	WhatsOnStage Awards	Best Video Design	Frozen	Won
2022	WhatsOnStage Awards	Best Video Design	Back to the Future: The Musical	Nominated
2022	Olivier Awards	Best Set Design	Back to the Future: The Musical	Nominated
2024	Tony Awards	Best Scenic Design of a Musical	Back to the Future: The Musical	Nominated
2024	Outer Critics Circle Award	Outstanding Projection Design	Back to the Future: The Musical	Won
2025	Henry Hewes Awards	Best Media Design	BOOP!	Won
