= Aibel (disambiguation) =

Aibel may refer to:

- Aibel, a service company
- Anthony Aibel, an American actor and musical director
- Jonathan Aibel, an American screenwriter
