= Aaron Rhyne =

American video and projection designer

- Education: Fordham University
- Occupation: Video and projection designer (theatre)
- Known for: A Gentleman's Guide to Love and Murder and Anastasia
- Awards: 2014 and 2017 Drama Desk Award for Outstanding Projection Design; 2017 Outer Critics Circle Award

Aaron Rhyne is an American video and projection designer for live theater. He is best known for his designs in the Broadway productions of Anastasia, A Gentleman's Guide to Love and Murder, and Bonnie and Clyde, as well as The Ghosts of Versailles at LA Opera. He won a Drama Desk Award for Outstanding Projection Design in 2014 and 2017.

He designed large-scale musicals for Disney including Frozen Live at the Hyperion, Tangled The Musical, and Frozen - A Musical Spectacular. Additionally he teaches projection design at UCLA.

== Work ==
=== Broadway ===
- For Colored Girls Who Have Considered Suicide
- Anastasia
- A Gentleman's Guide to Love and Murder
- Bonnie and Clyde
- The Sound Inside

=== Off Broadway ===
- The Absolute Brightness of Leonard Pelkey, Westside Theatre
- Bootycandy, Playwrights Horizons
- Appropriate, Signature Theatre Company
- Water By The Spoonful, Second Stage Theatre
- Working, 59E59
- Wild With Happy, The Public
- Graceland, Lincoln Center Theatre
- Spirit Control, Manhattan Theatre Club
- The Lily's Revenge, HERE Arts Center

=== Regional, Opera, Dance, International ===
- The Ghosts Of Versailles, LA Opera
- Jerry Springer: The Opera, Carnegie Hall, Sydney Opera House
- Aubergine, Berkley Repertory Theatre
- The Power of Duff, Geffen Playhouse, Huntington Theatre Company
- The Sun Also Rises, Washington Ballet
- Frozen - Live at the Hyperion, Disney California Adventure, Disneyland Resort
- La Traviata, Wolftrap
- Working, The Old Globe, Asolo Repertory Theatre
- Florencia En El Amazonas, Opera Colorado, Utah Opera
- Vices, Theatre Aspen
- The Civil War, Ford's Theatre
- Strange Interlude, Shakespeare Theatre
- Pericles, Chicago Shakespeare Theatre
- Violet, Ford's Theatre

== Awards and honors ==
- 2010 Hewes Award (nomination) for The Lily's Revenge, HERE Arts Center
- 2011 Denver Ovation Award (nomination) for Vices, Theatre Aspen
- 2013 Drama Desk Award for Outstanding Projection Design (nomination) for Wild With Happy, The Public Theatre
- 2014 Craig Noel Award (nomination) for A Gentleman's Guide to Love and Murder, The Old Globe
- 2014 Drama Desk Award for Outstanding Projection Design for A Gentleman's Guide to Love and Murder, Walter Kerr Theatre
- 2015 Jeff Award (nomination) for Pericles, Chicago Shakespeare Theater
- 2016 Connecticut Critics Circle Award for Anastasia, Hartford Stage
- 2017 Drama Desk Award for Outstanding Projection Design for Anastasia, Hartford Stage
- 2017 Outer Critics Circle Award for Outstanding Projection Design for Anastasia.
