= Live event support =

All activities required for live performances

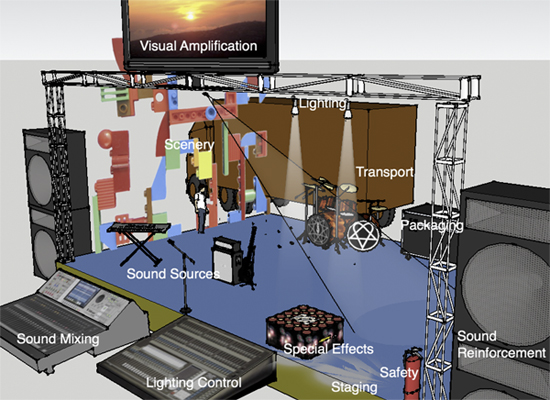
Live event support overview

Live event support includes staging, scenery, mechanicals, sound, lighting, video, special effects, transport, packaging, communications, costume and makeup for live performance events including theater, music, dance, and opera. Live performance events tend to use visual scenery, lighting, costume amplification and a shorter history of visual projection and sound amplification reinforcement.

== Visual support ==
=== Live event visual amplification ===
==== Introduction ====
Live event visual amplification is the display of live and pre-recorded images as a part of a live stage event. Visual amplification began when films, projected onto a stage, added characters or background information to a production. 35 mm motion picture projectors became available in 1910 – but which theatre or opera company first used a movie in a stage production is not known. In 1935, less costly 16 mm film equipment allowed many other performance groups and school theaters to use motion pictures in productions.

In 1970, closed circuit video cameras and videocassette machines became available and live event visual amplification came of age. For the first time live closeups of stage performers could be displayed in real time. These systems also made it possible to show pre-recorded videos that added information and visual intensity to a live event.

One of the first video touring systems was created by video designer TJ McHose in 1975 for the rock band The Tubes using black and white television monitors.

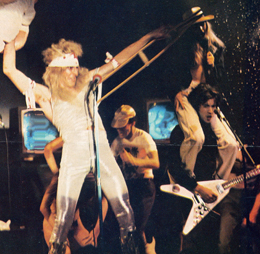
Touring black-and-white video system The Tubes 1975

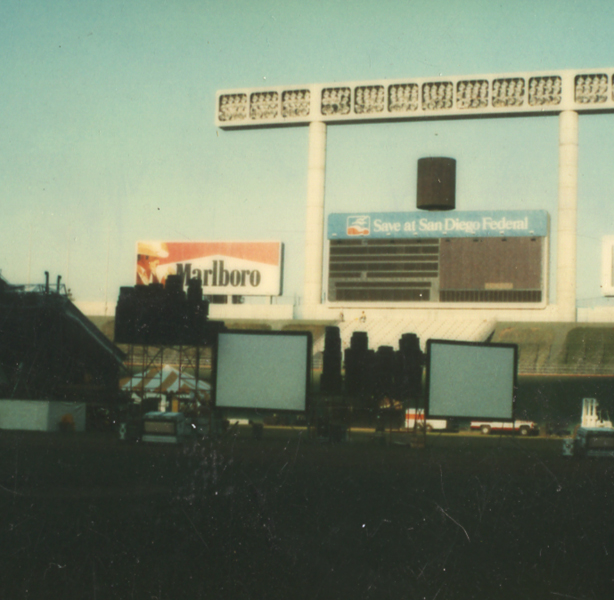
Touring color system Kool Jazz Festival 1978

In 1978, TJ McHose designed a touring color video system that enlarged performers at the Kool Jazz Festivals in sports stadiums across the United States.

=== Live event visual reinforcement ===
==== Introduction ====
Live event visual reinforcement is the addition of projected lighting effects and images onto any type of performance venue.

Visual reinforcement began more than 2000 years ago. In China, during the Han dynasty, shadow puppetry was invented to "bring back to life" Emperor Wu's favorite concubine (reigned 141 to 87 BCE). Mongolian troops spread shadow play throughout Asia and the Middle East in the 13th century. Shadow puppetry reached Taiwan in 1650, and missionaries brought it to France in 1767.

The next major advance in visual reinforcement for events was the magic lantern, first conceptualized by Giovanni Battista della Porta in his 1558 work Magiae naturalis. The magic lantern became practical by 1750 with the oil lamp and glass lenses. Special effect animation attachments were added in the 1830s. In 1854, the ambrotype positive photographic process on glass made magic lantern slide creation much less expensive.

Magic lanterns were greatly improved by the application of limelight to live stage production in 1837 at Covent Garden Theatre and improved again when electric arc lighting became available in 1880.

In 1910, Adolf Linnebach invented the Linnebach lantern, a lensless wide angle glass slide projector.

In 1933, the Gobo metal shadow pattern for the ellipsoidal spotlight allowed images to appear and disappear by dimmer control.

In 1935, 16 mm Kodachrome film projectors added the first fully animated visual reinforcement to live events.

==== Timeline ====
- 1600: Shadow play leather or paper puppets cast shadows on a translucent screen
- 1760: magic lantern painted slide projector Phantasmagoria ghost effects projector
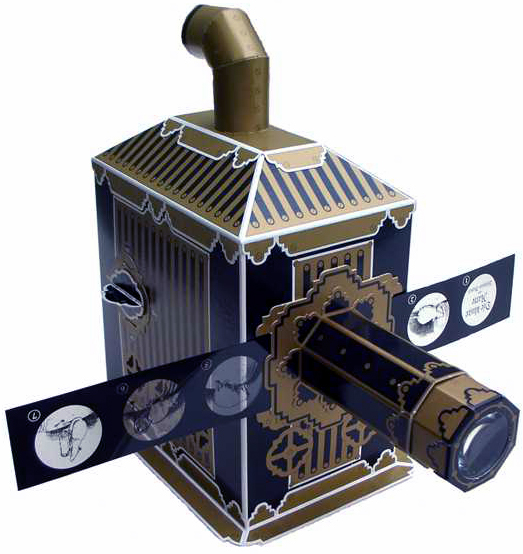
  Magic Lantern image projector
- 1905: Linnebach lantern Munich Opera
- 1933: Gobo metal shadow mask adds patterns to ellipsoidal spotlights
- 1940: Overhead projector Later used for psychedelic light shows
- 1950: Slide projector 35 mm Kodak Carousel
- 1965: Thomas Wilfred describes A highly detailed system to create event scenery using rear projections
- 1967: Liquid projector, psychedelic liquid light shows
  - Joshua Light Shows at The Fillmore for the Grateful Dead, Big Brother and the Holding Company and many other Summer of Love bands

== Audio support ==
=== Live event sound reinforcement ===
==== Introduction ====
A sound reinforcement system is professional audio, was first developed for movie theatres in 1927 when the first ever talking picture was released, called The Jazz Singer. Movie theatre sound was greatly improved in 1937 when the Shearer Horn system debuted. One of the first large-scale outdoor public address systems was at 1939 New York World's Fair.

In the 1960s, rock and roll concerts promoted by Bill Graham at The Fillmore created a need for quickly changeable sound systems. In the early 1970s, Graham founded FM Productions to provide touring sound and light systems. By 1976 in San Francisco, the technical debate over infinite baffle vs horn-loaded enclosures, and line arrays vs distributed driver arrays, was ongoing at FM because of the proximity of The Grateful Dead and their scene Ultrasound, John Meyer, and others. But at that time there were parallel developments in other parts of the United States – Showco (Dallas) and Clair Bros (Philadelphia) had different approaches; Clair in particular was moving in the direction of modular full-range enclosures. They would rig as many as needed (or clients like Bruce Springsteen could afford) in whatever configuration they thought would cover a particular venue. Stanal Sound in southern California used fiberglass futuristic looking equipment for artists like Kenny Rogers.

==== Timeline ====
- 1876: Loudspeaker Alexander Graham Bell
- 1878: Carbon microphone / amplifier
- 1924: Loudspeaker – moving-coil -patent Chester W. Rice & E. Kellogg
- 1924: Loudspeaker – ribbon Walter H. Schottky
- 1930: Vacuum tube amplifier
- 1937: Loudspeaker – Shearer Horn movie theatre system
- 1939: public address outdoor system 1939 New York World's Fair
- 1945: Loudspeaker – coaxial Altec "Voice of the Theatre"
- 1953: Loudspeaker – electrostatic -patent Arthur Janszen
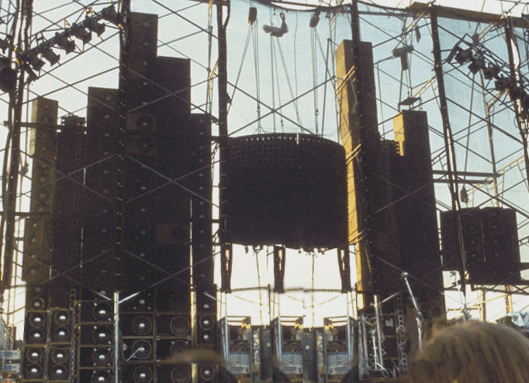
  Touring sound reinforcement system
- 1953: Microphone – wireless
- 1965: Loudspeaker – woofer
- 1965: Loudspeaker – subwoofer
- 1970: Microphone – condenser
- 1974: Loudspeaker – Sensurround movie sound system for "Earthquake"
- 1974: Loudspeaker – Dolby Stereo 70 mm Six Track
- 1975: Loudspeaker – touring – McCune JM-3 John Meyer
- 1979: Loudspeaker – Meyer Sound Laboratories – Grateful Dead wall of sound
- 1983: Loudspeaker – THX movie sound system for Star Wars

== Transportation support ==
Efficient and timely transportation is essential for live event productions.

=== Touring packaging ===
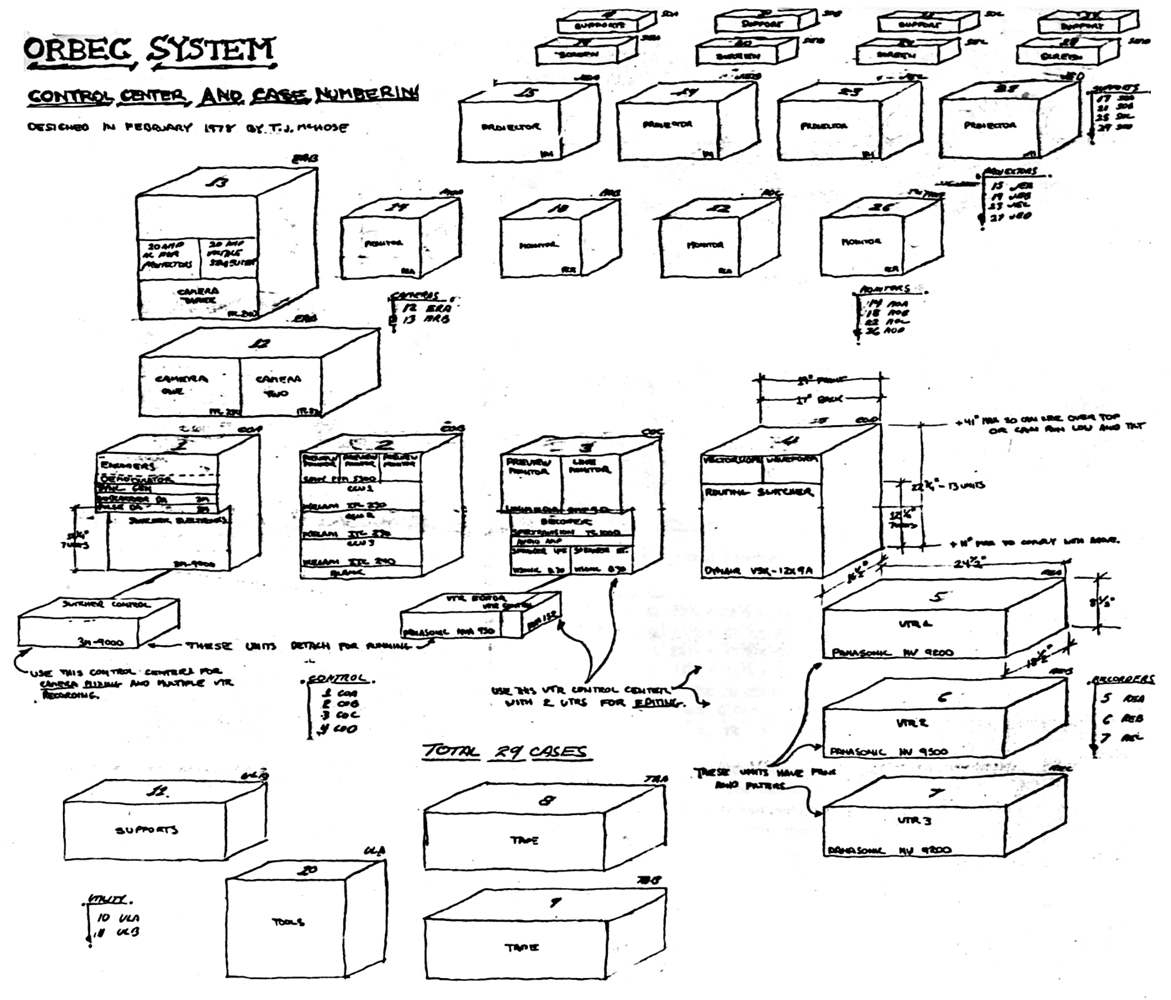
Touring video system schematic

Well designed touring systems unload from the truck gently, roll easily into their stage location, connect to each other quickly. A well designed system includes duplicates of critical components and "field-replaceable" items such as cables, switches and fuses. Every component should be protected by a well padded road case that has room for all connector cables and allows easy access to the components for fast cable re-patching to bypass a bad component and for repairs during a tour. The road cases need good ventilation and for outdoor use should be white to minimize solar heat buildup. Road case sizes should be modular to pack tightly together on the truck.

=== Packaging images ===
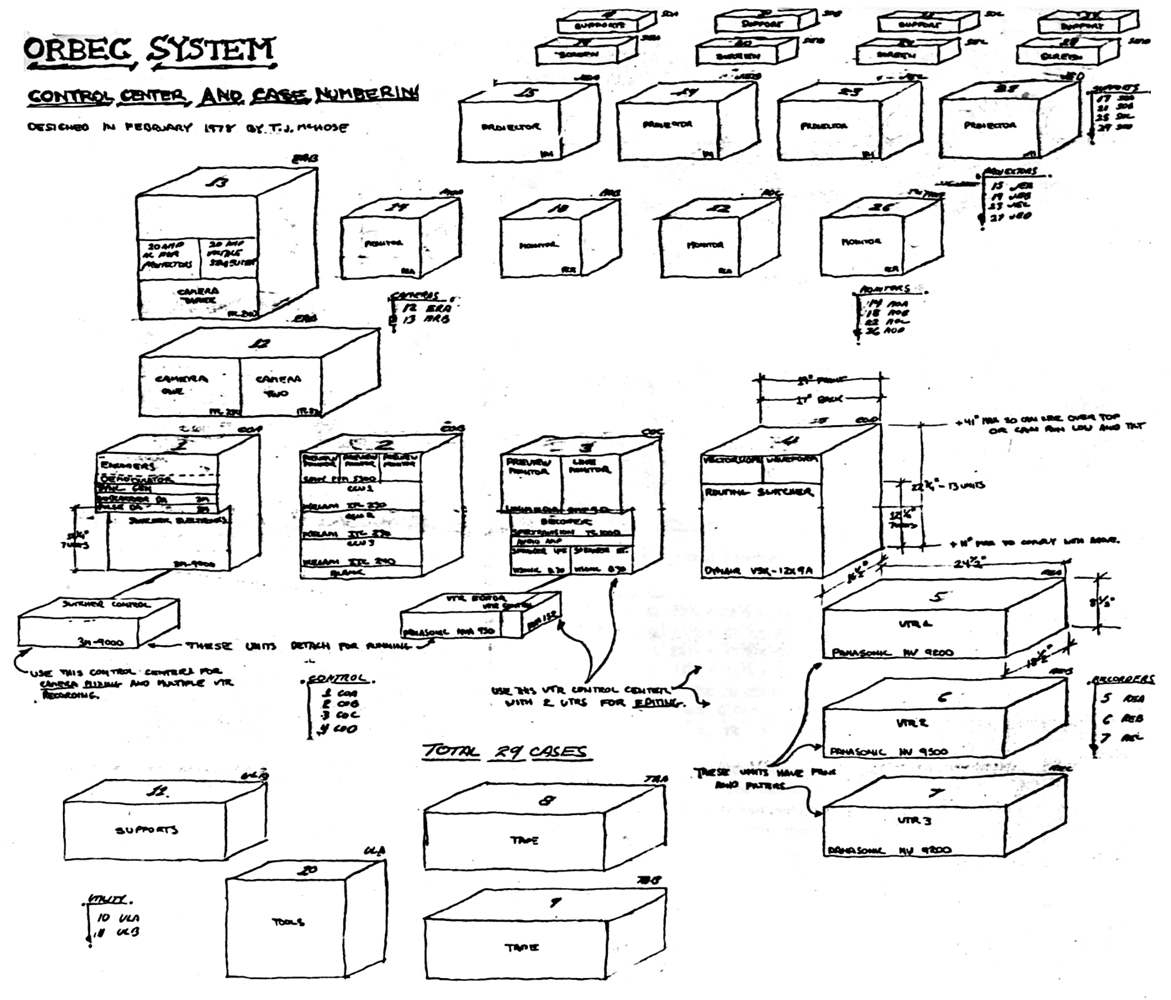
Touring video system schematic

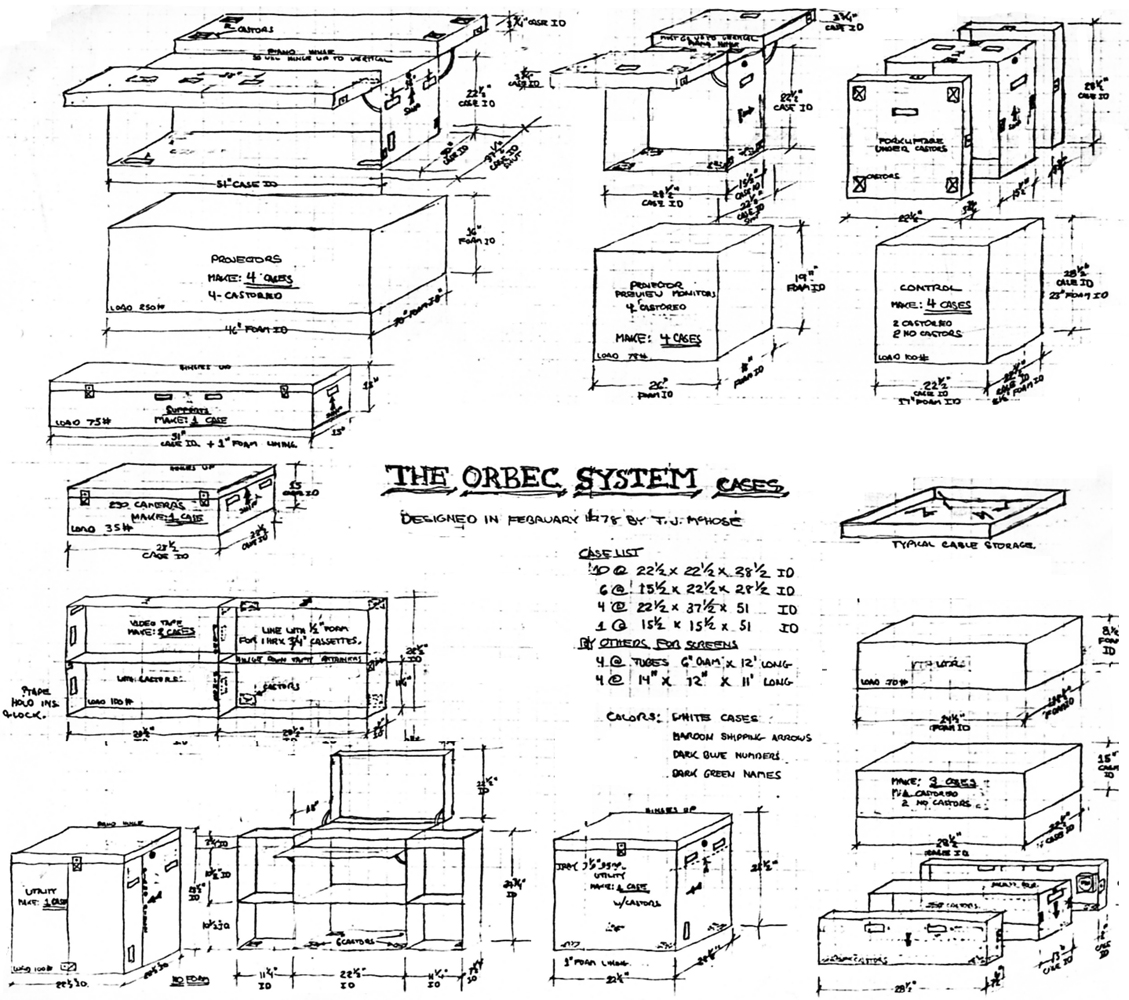
Touring cases schematic for Video display system Kool Jazz Festival 1978

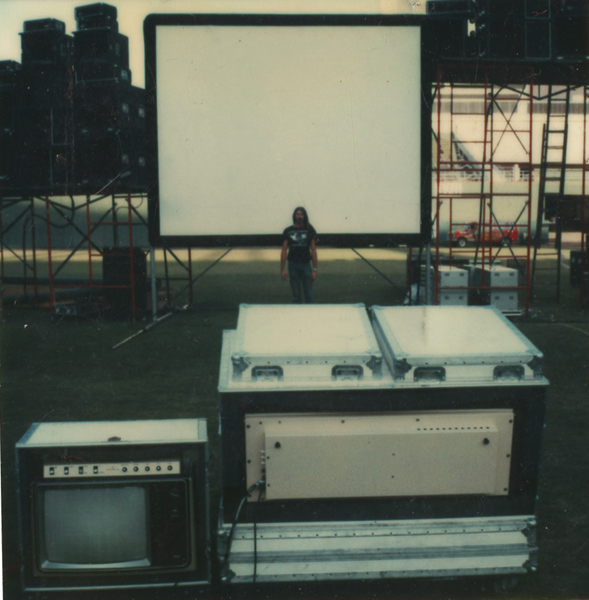
Color video projector in road case – Kool Jazz Festival

== See also ==
- Audio equipment
- Concert video design
- Live sound mixing
- Rock festival
- Sound recording and reproduction
- Stagecraft
- Video design
- VJing

== Sources ==
- Pollard, Elizabeth; Rosenberg, Clifford; Tignor, Robert (2015). Worlds Together Worlds Apart. Volume One - Beginning Through the 15th Century (concise ed.). New York City: W.W. Norton & Company. ISBN 9780393918472.
