= David Bengali =

American lighting and projection designer

- Born: U.S.
- Occupations: Projection Designer, Lighting Designer

David Bengali is a projection and media designer for theater.

== Career ==
David was an Arts Fellow at the Lewis Center for the Arts at Princeton University and holds an MFA at New York University. He is a member of United Scenic Artists, Local USA 829, IATSE.

== Selected productions ==
=== Broadway ===
- 1776 – 2022
- The Thanksgiving Play – 2023
- Water for Elephants – 2024

=== Off-Broadway ===
- Van Gogh’s Ear – 2018
- The Great Leap – 2018
- Einstein's Dreams – 2019
- Twilight: Los Angeles, 1992 – 2022
- The Visitor – 2022
- Circle Jerk – 2022
- Anthony Rapp’s Without You – 2023
- Monsoon Wedding – 2023
- Walk on Through: Confessions of a Museum Novice – 2023
- Here There Are Blueberries – 2024

=== National Tours ===
- 1776 – 2023
- Peter Pan – 2024

== Awards and nominations ==
Year	Result	Award	Category	Work	Ref.
2017	Won	New York Independent Theater Awards	Outstanding Innovative Design	The Dudleys!	
2018	Nominated	Drama Desk Award	Outstanding Projection Design	Van Gogh’s Ear	
2018	Nominated	Drama Desk Award	Outstanding Projection Design	Einstein's Dreams	
2022	Nominated	Drama Desk Award	Outstanding Projection Design	Twilight: Los Angeles, 1992	
2022	Nominated	Lucille Lortel Awards	Outstanding Projection Design	The Visitor	
2022	Won	Obie Award	Special Citation	Circle Jerk	
2024	Nominated	Tony Awards	Best Lighting Design in a Musical	Water for Elephants	
2024	Nominated	Outer Critics Circle Awards	Outstanding Video/Projections (Broadway or Off-Broadway)	Water for Elephants	
2024	Won	Helen Hayes Award	Outstanding Media/Projection Design	Here There Are Blueberries	
2025	Nominated	Tony Awards	Best Lighting Design in a Play	Good Night, and Good Luck	
