= List of NYIT Awards ceremonies =

Off-Off-Broadway theatre awards

The New York Independent Theater Awards (formerly known as the New York Innovative Theatre Awards) are accolades given annually by The League of Independent Theater to honor individuals and organizations who have achieved artistic excellence in Off-Off-Broadway theatre.

The awards were created by The New York Innovative Theatre Foundation in 2004. They were renamed in 2023 upon the Foundation's merger with The League of Independent Theater, who now administer the awards.

== 2005 Awards ==
The inaugural awards ceremony was held on Monday, September 19 at the Lucille Lortel Theatre. It was hosted by Charles Busch, with a special presentation by Judith Haking. The opening number was performed by the cast of [title of show], Hunter Bell, Jeff Bowen, Susan Blackwell, Heidi Blickenstaff and Larry Pressgrove.

=== Competitive Awards ===
Award	Recipient	Production	Producer/Theatre
Outstanding Ensemble	Catherine Jhung, Don Nahaku, Lethia Nall, Matthew Pendergast, A-men Rasheed, Tijuana Ricks, Antonio G. del Rosario, Debargo Sanyal, Ragini Shah, Sam Younis	Pulling the Lever	Rising Circle Theater Collective
Outstanding Solo Performance	James Scruggs	Disposable Men	HERE Arts Center
Outstanding Actor In A Featured Role	Nicky Paraiso	Iphigenia	LaMaMa E.T.C. in association with Sky Saver Productions
Outstanding Actress In A Featured Role	Sara Thigpen	Burning the Old Man	Boomerang Theatre Company
Outstanding Actor In A Lead Role	Troy Lavallee	Serenade & Philosopher Fox	The Polish Cultural Institute of New York
Outstanding Actress In A Lead Role (tie)	Carolyn Goelzer	Iphigenia	LaMaMa E.T.C. in association with Sky Saver Productions
	Maria McConville	Honor part 2	Drilling Company NY
Outstanding Choreography / Movement	Jennifer L. Mudge	It's Karate, Kid! The Musical	The Four Corners Project
Outstanding Director	Paul Bargetto	Serenade & Philosopher Fox	The Polish Cultural Institute of New York
Outstanding Set Design	Michael Allen	Masquerade	Ten Grand and a Burger
Outstanding Lighting Design	Daniel Ordower	Hazard County	Themantics Group
Outstanding Costume Design	Rob Eggers	Othello	Palehorse Productions
Outstanding Sound Design	Quentin Chiappetta	Murder in the First	Invictus Theatre Company
Outstanding Original Music	Quentin Chiappetta	Murder in the First	Invictus Theatre Company
Outstanding Original Short Script	P. Seth Bauer	First Time Out of Bounds	Drilling Company NY
Outstanding Original Full-Length Script	Kelly McAllister	Burning the Old Man	Boomerang Theatre Company
Outstanding Performance Art Production	all wear bowlers		HERE Arts Center
Outstanding Production of a Musical	It's Karate, Kid! The Musical		The Four Corners Project
Outstanding Production of a Play	Serenade & Philosopher Fox		The Polish Cultural Institute of New York

=== Honorary Awards ===
Award	Recipient
Artistic Achievement Award	Basil Twist
Stewardship Award	Ellen Stewart
Caffe Cino Fellowship Award	Jeff Riebe

== 2006 Awards ==
The 2006 New York Innovative Theatre Awards were held on Monday, September 18 at Cooper Union in New York City. The event was hosted by Charles Busch, with a special presentation by Lisa Stevenson.

=== Competitive Awards ===
Award	Recipient	Production	Producer
Outstanding Ensemble	David Carr-Berry, Jared Culverhouse, Ellen David, Paul Fears, Andaye' Hill, Julian James, Gregory Porter Miller & Brian Schlanger	To Nineveh: A Modern Miracle	Working Man's Clothes
Outstanding Solo Performance	Margaux Laskey	size ate	size ate productions
Outstanding Actor In A Featured Role	Trey Gibbons	How I Learned To Drive	T. Schreiber Studio
Outstanding Actress In A Featured Role	Summer Moore	Last Summer at Bluefish Cove	T. Schreiber Studio
Outstanding Actor In A Lead Role	Greg Horton	The Singapore Mikado	Theater Ten Ten
Outstanding Actress In A Lead Role	Ellen David	To Nineveh: A Modern Miracle	Working Man's Clothes
Outstanding Choreography / Movement	Marius Hanford	Living Dead In Denmark	Vampire Cowboys Theatre Company
Outstanding Director	Isaac Byrne	To Nineveh: A Modern Miracle	Working Man's Clothes
Outstanding Set Design	Eddy Trotter	Love! Valour! Compassion!	T. Schreiber Studio
Outstanding Lighting Design	Arthur Adair	The Emperor Jones	La MaMa, E.T.C.
Outstanding Costume Design	Sidney Shannon	Iron Curtain	Prospect Theater Company
Outstanding Sound Design	Paul John DeSena	To Nineveh: A Modern Miracle	Working Man's Clothes
Outstanding Original Music	Brendan Connelly	Major Barbara	La MaMa, E.T.C. in association with Two-Headed Calf
Outstanding Original Short Script	Vishakan Jeyakumar	Jaffna Mangoes	Desipina & Company
Outstanding Original Full-Length Script	Bekah Brunstetter	To Nineveh: A Modern Miracle	Working Man's Clothes
Outstanding Performance Art Production	Too Much Light Makes the Baby Go Blind	Too Much Light Makes the Baby Go Blind	New York Neo-Futurists
Outstanding Production of a Musical	Iron Curtain	Iron Curtain	Prospect Theater Company
Outstanding Production of a Play	To Nineveh: A Modern Miracle	To Nineveh: A Modern Miracle	Working Man's Clothes

=== Honorary Awards ===
Award	Recipient
Artistic Achievement Award	Tom O'Horgan
Stewardship Award	The Field
Caffe Cino Fellowship Award	The Vampire Cowboys Theatre Company

== 2007 Awards ==
The 2007 New York Innovative Theatre Awards were held on Monday, September 24 at the Fashion Institute of Technology's Haft Auditorium in New York City. The event was hosted by Julie Halston, with a presentation by Rising Phoenix Repertory's Elizabeth West.

=== Competitive Awards ===
Award	Recipient	Production	Producer
Outstanding Ensemble	Boo Killebrew, Julia Lowrie Henderson, Ryan Purcell, Max Rosenak, Phillip Taratula & Daniel Walker Stowell	6969	CollaborationTown, A Theatre Company Inc.
Outstanding Original Short Script	Daniel Reitz	Rules of the Universe	Rising Phoenix Repertory
Outstanding Original Full Length Script	Saviana Stanescu	Waxing West	East Coast Artists]
Outstanding Solo Performance	Mike Houston	The Ledge	eavesdrop
Outstanding Director	Daniel Talbott	Rules of the Universe	Rising Phoenix Repertory
Outstanding Choreography/Movement	Dan Safer	Dancing Vs the Rat Experiment	La MaMa ETC in association with Witness Relocation
Outstanding Set Design	George Allison	Picasso at the Lapin Agile	T. Schreiber Studio
Outstanding Lighting Design	Peter Hoerburger	The Present Perfect	The Operating Theater
Outstanding Sound Design	Ryan Maeker & Tim Schellenbaum	Dancing Vs the Rat Experiment	La MaMa ETC in association with Witness Relocation]
Outstanding Costume Design	David Withrow	Bug Boy Blues	The Looking Glass Theatre
Outstanding Original Music	Leanne Darling	The Landlord	Toy Box Theatre Company
Outstanding Actor in a Leading Role	Max Rosenak	6969	CollaborationTown, A Theatre Company Inc.
Outstanding Actress in a Leading Role	Susan Louise O'Connor	the silent concerto	Packawallop Productions, Inc.
Outstanding Actor in a Featured Role	Joe Plummer	As You Like It	poortom productions
Outstanding Actress in a Featured Role	Boo Killebrew	6969	CollaborationTown, A Theatre Company Inc.]
Outstanding Performance Art Production	Dancing Vs the Rat Experiment	Dancing Vs the Rat Experiment	La MaMa ETC in association with Witness Relocation
Outstanding Production of a Musical	Urinetown, The Musical	Urinetown, The Musical	The Gallery Players
Outstanding Production of a Play	Bouffon Glass Menajoree	Bouffon Glass Menajoree	Ten Directions

=== Honorary Awards ===
Award	Recipient
Artistic Achievement Award	Doric Wilson
Stewardship Award	Alliance of Resident Theatres/New York
Caffe Cino Fellowship Award	Rising Phoenix Repertory

== 2008 Awards ==
The 2008 New York Innovative Theatre Awards were held on Monday, September 22 at the Fashion Institute of Technology's Haft Auditorium in New York City. The event was hosted by Lisa Kron, with performances by the Blue Man Group, and a presentation by Boomerang Theatre Company's Jennifer Larkin, Joe Whelski and Vinnie Penna.

=== Competitive Awards ===
Award	Recipient	Production	Producer
Outstanding Ensemble	Elena Chang, Noshir Dalal, Jon Hoche, Kelley Rae O'Donnell, Melissa Paladino, Maureen Sebastian, Andrea Marie Smith, Paco Tolson, Temar Underwood	Fight Girl Battle World	Vampire Cowboys Theatre Company
Outstanding Original Short Script	Aliza Shane	The Three Sillies	The Looking Glass Theatre
Outstanding Original Full Length Script	Bekah Brunstetter	You May Go Now	Babel Theatre Project
Outstanding Solo Performance	Andrea Caban	You Got Questions? I Got Answers!	Coyote REP Theatre Company
Outstanding Director	Edward Elefterion	The Night of Nosferatu	Rabbit Hole Ensemble
Outstanding Choreography/Movement	Qui Nguyen	Fight Girl Battle World	Vampire Cowboys Theatre Company
Outstanding Set Design	Sean Breault	Art of Memory	Company SoGoNo
Outstanding Lighting Design	Kevin Hardy	The Night of Nosferatu	Rabbit Hole Ensemble
Outstanding Sound Design	Dan Bianchi	The Island of Dr. Moreau	Radiotheatre
Outstanding Costume Design	Jessica Wegener	Fight Girl Battle World	Vampire Cowboys Theatre Company
Outstanding Original Music	Dan Bianchi	The Island of Dr. Moreau	Radiotheatre
Outstanding Actor in a Leading Role	Cameron J. Oro	The Accidental Patriot	The Stolen Chair Theatre Company
Outstanding Actress in a Leading Role	Stephanie Barton-Farcas	Elizabeth Rex	Nicu's Spoon
Outstanding Actor in a Featured Role	Rob Sheridan	The Two Lives of Napoleon Beazley	Incumbo Theater Company
Outstanding Actress in a Featured Role	Megan Byrne	No End of Blame	Potomac Theatre Project
Outstanding Performance Art Production	Removable Parts	Removable Parts	HERE Arts Center
Outstanding Production of a Musical	Yank! A New Musical	Yank! A New Musical	The Gallery Players
Outstanding Production of a Play	Burn, Crave, Hold: The James Wilde Project	Burn, Crave, Hold: The James Wilde Project	Blessed Unrest

1. Podcast of interviews with the presenters and nominees on Broadway Bullet

=== Honorary Awards ===
Award	Recipient
Artistic Achievement Award	Judith Malina
Stewardship Award	The New York Theatre Experience, Martin & Rochelle Denton
Caffe Cino Fellowship Award	Boomerang Theatre Company

== 2009 Awards ==
=== Competitive Awards ===
Award	Recipient	Production	Producer
Outstanding Ensemble	Christopher Borg, Jeffrey Cranor, Kevin R. Free & Eevin Hartsough	(Not) Just A Day Like Any Other	New York Neo-Futurists
Outstanding Original Short Script	Nico Vreeland	The Interview, Elephants on Parade 2009	EBE Ensemble
Outstanding Original Full Length Script	Nat Cassidy	The Reckoning of Kit & Little Boots	The Gallery Players in association with Engine37
Outstanding Solo Performance	Jeff Grow	Creating Illusion!	soloNOVA Arts Festival
Outstanding Director	Suzi Takahashi	Lee/gendary	HERE Arts Center
Outstanding Choreography/Movement	Austin McCormick	The Judgment of Paris	Company XIV
Outstanding Set Design	Michael P. Kramer	Ragtime	Astoria Performing Arts Center
Outstanding Lighting Design	Bruce Steinberg	Blue Before Morning	terraNOVA Collective
Outstanding Sound Design	Asa Wember	Angel Eaters	Flux Theatre Ensemble
Outstanding Costume Design	Michelle Beshaw	The Very Sad Story of Ethel & Julius	GOH Productions
Outstanding Original Music	Kimmy Gatewood, Andy Hertz, Rebekka Johnson, Sarah Lowe & Jeff Solomon	The Apple Sisters	The Apple Sisters
Outstanding Actor in a Leading Role	Julian Elfer	Twelfth Night, or What You Will	T. Schreiber Studio
Outstanding Actress in a Leading Role	Elyse Mirto	Any Day Now	Writer's Forum at Manhattan Theatre Source
Outstanding Actor in a Featured Role	William Apps IV	Amerissiah	The Amoralists Theatre Company
Outstanding Actress in a Featured Role	Constance Parng	Lee/gendary	HERE Arts Center
Outstanding Performance Art Production	Creating Illusion	Creating Illusion	soloNOVA Arts Festival
Outstanding Production of a Musical	Like You Like It	Like You Like It	The Gallery Players
Outstanding Production of a Play	Lee/gendary	Lee/gendary	HERE Arts Center

1. Podcast of backstage interviews with the presenters and recipients by Michael Gilboe on Broadway Bullet

=== Honorary Awards ===
Award	Recipient
Artistic Achievement Award	Maria Irene Fornes
Stewardship Award	Harriet Taub and Materials for the Arts
Caffe Cino Fellowship Award	The Brick Theater
Outstanding Stage Manager Award	Jillian Zeman, Ragtime, Astoria Performing Arts Center

== 2010 Awards ==
=== Competitive Awards ===
Award	Recipient	Production	Producer
Outstanding Ensemble	Marc Bovino, Joe Curnutte, Michael Dalto, Stephanie Wright Thompson	Samuel and Alasdair: A Personal History of the Robot War	
Outstanding Original Short Script	Jonothon Lyons	The Tenement	
Outstanding Original Full Length Script	Crystal Skillman	The Vigil or The Guided Cradle	
Outstanding Solo Performance (tie)	Jesse Zaritt	Binding	Theatre C and terraNOVA Collective's soloNOVA Arts Festival
	Dan Berkey	Remission	
Outstanding Director	Brian Smith	Pink!	
Outstanding Choreography/Movement	Jesse Zaritt	Binding	
Outstanding Set Design	Michael P. Kramer	Children of Eden	
Outstanding Lighting Design	Charles Foster	Fêtes de la Nuit	
Outstanding Sound Design	Stowe Nelson	Samuel and Alasdair: A Personal History of the Robot War	
Outstanding Costume Design	Olivera Gajic	Le Serpent Rouge	
Outstanding Innovative Design	C. Andrew Bauer	Fêtes de la Nuit	
Outstanding Original Music	Mark Valadez	Caucasian Chalk Circle	
Outstanding Actor in a Leading Role	Frank Anderson	The Return of Peter Grimm	
Outstanding Actress in a Leading Role	Elizabeth A. Davis	Emily, An Amethyst Remembrance	
Outstanding Actor in a Featured Role	Amir Darvish	Psych	Cake Productions
Outstanding Actress in a Featured Role	Jennifer Harder	MilkMilkLemonade	
Outstanding Performance Art Production	Binding		Theatre C and terraNOVA Collective's soloNOVA Arts Festival
Outstanding Production of a Musical	Children of Eden		
Outstanding Production of a Play	Samuel and Alasdair: A Personal History of the Robot War		

=== Honorary Awards ===
Award	Recipient
Artistic Achievement Award	Lanford Wilson
Stewardship Award	Dixon Place
Caffe Cino Fellowship Award	New York Neo-Futurists

== 2011 Awards ==
The 2011 New York Innovative Theatre Awards were held on Monday, September 19 at Cooper Union's Great Hall in New York City. The event was hosted by comedian Harrison Greenbaum, with a presentation by the Flux Theatre Ensemble.

=== Competitive Awards ===
Award	Recipient	Production	Producer
Outstanding Ensemble	Whitney Branan, Jennifer DiDonato, Tauren Hagans, Robert Anthony Jones, Edward Juvier, Lorinne Lampert, Aaron J. Libby, Jake Mendes, Trey Mitchell, Jan-Peter Pedross, Colin Pritchard, Megan Rosenblatt, Chloe Sabin, Dawn Trautman, Craig Treubert, Tyler Wallach, Eric Weaver	The Drowsy Chaperone	The Gallery Players
Outstanding Solo Performance	Nat Cassidy	Things at the Doorstep: An Evening of Horror Based on the Works of H.P. Lovecraft	Manhattan Theatre Source, Greg Oliver Bodine, and Nat Cassidy
Outstanding Actor in a Featured Role	David Darrow	The Revival	Project Y Theatre Company
Outstanding Actress in a Featured Role	Deanna McGovern	An Impending Rupture of the Belly	Godlight Theatre Company
Outstanding Actor in a Lead Role	Nick Paglino	An Impending Rupture of the Belly	Godlight Theatre Company
Outstanding Actress in a Lead Role	Kristen Vaughan	Benefactors	Retro Productions
Outstanding Director	Leslie Kincaid Burby	The Navigator	WorkShop Theater Company
Outstanding Choreography/Movement	Christine O'Grady	The Drowsy Chaperone	The Gallery Players
Outstanding Lighting Design	Duane Pagano	The Navigator	WorkShop Theater Company
Outstanding Costume Design	Ryan J. Moller	The Drowsy Chaperone	The Gallery Players
Outstanding Set Design	Kevin Judge	The Revival	Project Y Theatre Company
Outstanding Sound Design	Aldo Perez	Radio Purgatory	Theater THE
Outstanding Innovative Design	Kae Burke, aerial and circus rigging design	Circus of Circus	The House of Yes
Outstanding Original Music	Cormac Bluestone	The Caucasian Chalk Circle	Pipeline Theatre Company
Outstanding Original Short Script	Isaac Oliver	Come Here	The Spring Fling, F*It Club
Outstanding Original Full-Length Script	Jonathan Blitstein	Keep Your Baggage With You (at all times)	Artists Empire
Outstanding Performance Art Production	Locker #4173b		New York Neo-Futurists
Outstanding Production of a Musical	The Drowsy Chaperone		The Gallery Players
Outstanding Production of a Play	Balm in Gilead		T. Schreiber Studio

=== Honorary Awards ===
Award	Recipient
Artistic Achievement Award	Robert Patrick
Stewardship Award	Horse Trade Theater Group
Caffe Cino Fellowship Award	Flux Theater Ensemble
Outstanding Stage Manager Award	Laura Schlachtmeyer

== 2012 Awards ==
=== Competitive Awards ===
Award	Recipient	Production	Producer/Theatre
Outstanding Ensemble	Justin Badger, David M. Barber, Melody Bates, Stephanie Dodd, Jeffrey Fracé, Connie Hall, Kelly Hayes, Jerusha Klemperer, Peter Lettre, Rachel Murdy, Melody Bates, Peter Richards	Conni's Avant Garde Restaurant Returns in: The Mothership Landing	Conni's Avant Garde Restaurant in association with the Irondale Center
Outstanding Solo Performance	Melanie Jones	Endure: A Run Woman Show	Collision Productions
Outstanding Actor in a Featured Role	Stephen Alan Wilson	The Last Days of Judas Iscariot	T. Schreiber Studio
Outstanding Actress in a Featured Role	Celeste Arias	Demon Dreams (Oni No Yume)	Magic Futurebox
Outstanding Actor in a Lead Role	Greg Horton	A Man of No Importance	The Gallery Players
Outstanding Actress in a Lead Role	Renee Claire Bergeron	A Man of No Importance	The Gallery Players
Outstanding Choreography/Movement	Joe Osheroff & Evan Zes	Homunculus: Reloaded	Homunculus Mask Theater
Outstanding Director	Joe Osheroff	Homunculus: Reloaded	Homunculus Mask Theater
Outstanding Lighting Design	David A. Sexton	The Spring Fling: My Best/Worst Date Ever	F*It Club
Outstanding Costume Design	Sidney Fortner	The House of Mirth	Metropolitan Playhouse
Outstanding Set Design	Kevin Judge	LoveSick (or Things That Don't Happen)	Project Y Theatre Company
Outstanding Sound Design	Matt Schloss	Miranda	MirandaCo
Outstanding Innovative Design	Joe Osheroff	Mask Design - Homunculus: Reloaded	Homunculus Mask Theater
Outstanding Original Music	Jeff Raab	12th Night	Libra Theater Company
Outstanding Original Short Script	Chisa Hutchinson	This is Not the Play	Mad Dog Theatre Company
Outstanding Original Full-Length Script	Melanie Jones	Endure: A Run Woman Show	Collision Productions
Outstanding Performance Art Piece	Conni's Avant Garde Restaurant Returns in: The Mothership Landing		Conni's Avant Garde Restaurant in association with the Irondale Center
Outstanding Production of a Musical	Miranda		MirandaCo
Outstanding Premiere Production of a Play	Advance Man		Gideon Productions
Outstanding Production of a Remounted Play	Ajax in Iraq		Flux Theatre Ensemble

=== Honorary Awards ===
Award	Recipient
Artistic Achievement Award	Five Lesbian Brothers (Maureen Angelos, Babs Davy, Dominique Dibbell, Peg Healey, and Lisa Kron)
Stewardship Award	Theatre Development Fund
Caffe Cino Fellowship Award	Astoria Performing Arts Center

== 2013 Awards ==
=== Competitive Awards ===
Award	Recipient	Production	Producer/Theatre
Outstanding Ensemble	The Window:4 ALICE		PopUp Theatrics in association with the Romanian Cultural Institute in New York
Outstanding Solo Performance	Erin Treadway	Spaceman	Loading Dock Theatre Company
Outstanding Actor in a Featured Role	Justin Danforth	The Thirteenth Commandment	Libra Theater Company
Outstanding Actress in a Featured Role	Lauren Pennline	The Thirteenth Commandment	Libra Theater Company
Outstanding Actor in a Lead Role	Nick Smerkanich	The Window:4 ALICE	PopUp Theatrics in association with the Romanian Cultural Institute in New York
Outstanding Actress in a Lead Role	Amara Haaksman	That Lady from Maxim’s	Isle of Shoals Productions, Inc.
Outstanding Choreography/Movement	Jessica Burr and Sonia Vilani	Eurydice’s Dream	Blessed Unrest in association with The Interart Theatre
Outstanding Director	Padraic Lillis	The Rise And Fall Of A Teenage Cyberqueen	LabRats Theatre Company
Outstanding Lighting Design	Maruti Evans	Will Elliott’s The Pilo Family Circus	Godlight Theatre Company
Outstanding Costume Design	Daniela Codarcea Kamiliotis	The Window:4 ALICE	PopUp Theatrics in association with the Romanian Cultural Institute in New York
Outstanding Set Design	Daniela Codarcea Kamiliotis	The Window:4 ALICE	PopUp Theatrics in association with the Romanian Cultural Institute in New York
Outstanding Sound Design	Leegrid Stevens	Spaceman	Loading Dock Theatre Company
Outstanding Innovative Design	Lynda White - Mask Design & Construction	Oedipus Rex XX/XY	The Faux-Real Theatre Company
Outstanding Original Music	Bryan Williams	That Lady from Maxim’s	Isle of Shoals Productions, Inc.
Outstanding Original Short Script	Jonathan Draxton	Soldier	The Plowmen
Outstanding Original Full-length Script	Bryan Williams	That Lady from Maxim’s	Isle of Shoals Productions, Inc.
Outstanding Performance Art Production	Doctor Faustus Lights the Lights		Production Workshop in association with Kickstarter Backers
Outstanding Production of a Musical	That Lady from Maxim’s		Isle of Shoals Productions, Inc
Outstanding Premiere Production of A Play	The Rise And Fall Of A Teenage Cyberqueen		LabRats Theatre Company
Outstanding Revival of A Play	Macbeth		The Crook Theater Company

=== Honorary Awards ===
Award	Recipient
Artistic Achievement Award	Richard Foreman
Stewardship Award	The Dramatists Guild Fund
Caffe Cino Fellowship Award	terraNOVA Collective
2013 Doric Wilson Independent playwright Award	Mariah MacCarthy,
Outstanding Stage Manager Award	Abbey Bay

== 2014 Awards ==
=== Competitive Awards ===
Award	Recipient	Production	Producer/Theatre
Outstanding Ensemble	Becky Baumwoll, Dinah Berkeley, Seikai Ishizuka, David Jenkins, Meera Kumbhani, Tasha Milkman, Marissa Molnar, Dan Reckart, Joe Tuttle, Leah Wagner	At First Sight (and Other Stories)	Broken Box Mime Theater
Outstanding Solo Performance	Sandy Moore	The Simple Stories	WorkShop Theater Company
Outstanding Actor in a Featured Role	Noel Joseph Allain	Luft Gangster	Nylon Fusion Collective
Outstanding Actress in a Featured Role	Jenny Seastone	The Gin Baby	Kid Brooklyn Productions and Mermaid Sands Productions
Outstanding Actor in a Lead Role	Jason O'Connell	Don Juan In Hell	Phoenix Theatre Ensemble
Outstanding Actress in a Lead Role	Heather E. Cunningham	An Appeal to the Woman of the House	Retro Productions
Outstanding Choreography/Movement	Carlos Neto	Gymnos: A Geek's Tragedy	Ticket 2 Eternity Productions
Outstanding Director	DeLisa M. White	Lights Narrow	Teatro Oscuro
Outstanding Lighting Design	Kia Rogers	Jane the Plain	Flux Theatre Ensemble
Outstanding Costume Design	Gail Cooper-Hecht	The Importance of Being Earnest	Take Wing And Soar Productions, Inc.
Outstanding Set Design	Travis McHale	Rubber Ducks and Sunsets	Ground Up Productions
Outstanding Sound Design	Christian Frederickson	The Awake	kef theatrical productions
Outstanding Innovative Design	Nicole Hill	Puppet Design - Mute	New York Neo-Futurists
Outstanding Original Music	Scott Munson	Sawbones & the Diamond Eater	Days of the Giants LLC
Outstanding Original Short Script	Lenore Wolf	April March, Fragments from an Unintegrated Life from East Side Stories: Movers	Metropolitan Playhouse
Outstanding Original Full-Length Script	David Stallings	Dark Water	Manhattan Theatre Works (MTWorks)
Outstanding Performance Art Production	The God Projekt		La MaMa in association with Lone Wolf Tribe
Outstanding Production of a Musical	Allegro		Astoria Performing Arts Center
Outstanding Premiere Production of A Play	Pirira		Theatre 167
Outstanding Revival of A Play	Don Juan In Hell		Phoenix Theatre Ensemble

=== Honorary Awards ===
Award	Recipient
Artistic Achievement Award	Dan Bianchi
Stewardship Award	Woodie King Jr.
Caffe Cino Fellowship Award	Blessed Unrest

== 2015 Awards ==
=== Competitive Awards ===
Award	Recipient	Production	Producer
Outstanding Ensemble	Olivia Caputo, Michael Vincent Carrera, Mary Cavett, John Patrick Doherty, Austin Durant, Maxwell Eddy, Patrick Harvey, Alexandra Henrikson, Jonathan Hopkins, David Pegram, Lauren Pennline, Georgina Richardson, Sam Rosenberg, Will Sarratt, Kim Taff, Sophia Tupy, Corey Whelihan	Much Ado About Nothing	Smith Street Stage, Inc.
Outstanding Solo Performance	Sylvia Milo	The Other Mozart	Little Matchstick Factory
Outstanding Actor in a Featured Role	Dan McVey	Pretty Babies	Elsinore County
Outstanding Actress in a Featured Role	Mel House	In The Bones	Astoria Performing Arts Center
Outstanding Actor in a Lead Role	Matthew Trumbull	The Temple, or Lebensraum	Tin Drum Productions in Association with MozzleStead
Outstanding Actress in a Lead Role	Emily Koch	In The Bones	Astoria Performing Arts Center
Outstanding Choreography/Movement	Isaac Bush	The Mountain	The Circle Theater of New York
Outstanding Director	Isaac Byrne	In Vestments	Theatre 4the People
Outstanding Lighting Design	Nicole Pearce	The Law of Return	Newsom Zipoy Productions
Outstanding Costume Design	Debbi Hobson	Unmentionables	Nylon Fusion Theatre Company
Outstanding Set Design	Carolyn Mraz	The Twelfth Labor	Loading Dock Theatre Company
Outstanding Sound Design	Jeanne Travis	The Temple, or Lebensraum	Tin Drum Productions in Association with MozzleStead
Outstanding Innovative Design	Stephanie Cox-Williams	R & J & Z	Hard Sparks
Outstanding Original Music	Phyllis Chen & Nathan Davis	The Other Mozart	Little Matchstick Factory
Outstanding Original Short Script	Lisa Bruna	Invasion from Estrogenius: Andi's Night	manhattan theatre source
Outstanding Original Full-Length Script	Micheline Auger	Donkey Punch	Ivy Theatre Company
Outstanding Performance Art Production	Night		The New Stage Theatre Company
Outstanding Production of a Musical	Merrily We Roll Along		Astoria Performing Arts Center
Outstanding Premiere Production of a Play	In Vestments		Theatre 4the People
Outstanding Revival of a Play	Much Ado About Nothing		Smith Street Stage, Inc.

=== Honorary Awards ===
Award	Recipient
Ellen Stewart Award	Here Arts
Caffe Cino Award	Theatre 167
Doric Wilson Independent Playwright Award	Andrea Alton
Outstanding Stage Manager	Juni Li

== 2016 Awards ==
=== Competitive Awards ===
Award	Recipient	Production	Producer/Theatre
Outstanding Ensemble	Fred Backus, Broderick Ballantyne, Rebecca Gray Davis, Lex Friedman, Ian W. Hill, Bob Laine, Matthew Napoli, Timothy McCown Reynolds, Alyssa Simon, Anna Stefanic	The Golfer	Gemini CollisionWorks
Outstanding Solo Performance	Siobhan O’Loughlin	Broken Bone Bathtub	Elephant Run District
Outstanding Actor In A Featured Role	Timothy McCown Reynolds	The Golfer	Gemini CollisionWorks
Outstanding Actress In A Featured Role	Midori Francis	Connected	Project Y Theatre Company
Outstanding Actor In A Lead Role	Fred Backus	The Golfer	Gemini CollisionWorks
Outstanding Actress In A Lead Role	Maeve Yore	Harper Regan	T. Schreiber Studio
Outstanding Choreography / Movement	Becky Baumwoll	Above Below	Broken Box Mime Theater
Outstanding Director	Fritz Brekeller	Composure	WorkShop Theater Company
Outstanding Lighting Design	Aaron Gonzalez	Wait Until Dark	Variations Theatre Group
Outstanding Costume Design	Kaitlyn Elizabeth Day	The Golfer	Gemini CollisionWorks
Outstanding Set Design	George Allison	Hot L Baltimore	T. Schreiber Studio
Outstanding Sound Design	Joe Jung& KJ Sanchez	Unity (1918)	Project: Theater
Outstanding Innovative Design	Berit Johnson (Props Design)	The Golfer	Gemini CollisionWorks
Outstanding Original Music	Matt Sherwin	Gluten!	Adjusted Realists
Outstanding Original Short Script	Kim Katzberg	Strays	Kim Katzberg in collaboration with Nora Woolley and Raquel Cion
Outstanding Original Full-Length Script	Scott C. Sickles	Composure	WorkShop Theater Company
Outstanding Performance Art Production	Above Below		Broken Box Mime Theater
Outstanding Production of a Musical	Steve: A Docu-Musical		New York Neo-Futurists
Outstanding Premiere Production of a Play	Utility		The Amoralists
Outstanding Revival of a Play	Street Theater		TOSOS

=== Honorary Awards ===
Award	Recipient
2016 Ellen Stewart Award	The Fringe NYC
2016 Artistic Achievement Award	Carmelita Tropicana
2016 Caffe Cino Fellowship Award	New Stage Theatre Company
Outstanding Stage Manager Award	Jodi Witherell

== 2017 Awards ==
=== Competitive Awards ===
Award	Recipient	Production	Producer
Outstanding Ensemble	Brittany Allen, Vinie Burrows, Ugo Chukwu, Constance Cooper, Milo Cramer, Fernando Gonzalez, Jonathan Gordon, David Greenspan, Tommy Heleringer, Chris Henry, Veronica Hunsinger-Loe, Hannah Mitchell, Caitlin Morris, Craig Mungavin, Jeanna Phillips, Madeline Wise	Minor Character: Six Translations of Uncle Vanya at the Same Time	New Saloon Theater Co. in association with Emily Kaplan & Immediate Medium
Outstanding Original Short Script	Charlie O'Leary	Precious Body a part of Landmarks & TRANSformations	Project Y Theatre Company
Outstanding Original Full Length Script	Aditya Rawal	The Queen	Aman Soni in association with Juggernaut Theatre Co. and Theater for the New City
Outstanding Solo Performance	William DeMeritt	Origin Story	Old Sound Room
Outstanding Director	Morgan Green	Minor Character: Six Translations of Uncle Vanya at the Same Time	New Saloon Theater Co. in association with Emily Kaplan & Immediate Medium
Outstanding Choreography/Movement	Tamrin Goldberg	Raisin	Astoria Performing Arts Center
Outstanding Set Design	Frank Oliva	#liberated	The Living Room
Outstanding Lighting Design	Kate Jaworski	The Woman Who Was Me	Convergences Theatre Collective
Outstanding Sound Design	Aidan Meyer	The Red Room	The Shelter
Outstanding Costume Design	Izzy Fields	Anais Nin Goes to Hell	Manhattan Theatre Works (MTWorks) in association with Goode Productions
Outstanding Original Music	Melody Bates & Rebecca Hart	The Cabaret at the End of the World	Hard Sparks
Outstanding Innovative Design	David Bengali, John Erickson, Reid Farrington, Jorge Garcia-Spitz, David Mauro, Dan Monceaux, Leegrid Stevens for Video Design & Animation	The Dudleys!	Loading Dock Theatre Company
Outstanding Actor in a Leading Role	Nico Grelli	The Jamb	Hard Sparks
Outstanding Actress in a Leading Role	Moira Stone	Three Sisters	Obvious Volcano in association with Maggie Cino
Outstanding Actor in a Featured Role	Zack Krajnyak	Sweeney Todd	Theater 2020
Outstanding Actress in a Featured Role	Ivanna Cullinan	Three Sisters	Obvious Volcano in association with Maggie Cino
Outstanding Performance Art Production	The Infinite Wrench		New York Neo-Futurists
Outstanding Production of a Musical	Raisin		Astoria Performing Arts Center
Outstanding Revival of a Play	The Tempest		Smith Street Stage
Outstanding Premiere Production of a Play	Minor Character: Six Translations of Uncle Vanya at the Same Time		New Saloon Theater Co. in association with Emily Kaplan & Immediate Medium

=== Honorary Awards ===
Award	Recipient
Artistic Achievement Award	Lois Weaver & Peggy Shaw, Split Britches
Ellen Stewart Award	Crystal Fields
Doric Wilson Independent Playwrights Award	J. Stephen Brantley
Caffe Cino Fellowship Award	Retro Productions
Outstanding Stage Manager Award	Elizabeth Ramsey

== 2018 Awards ==
=== Competitive Awards ===
Award	Recipient	Production	Producer
Outstanding Ensemble	Denali Bennett, Victoria Bundonis, LaDonna Burns, Denise DeMars, Tia DeShazor, Susan Cohen DeStefano, Christine Donnelly, Andrea Dotto, Dan Entriken, Jonathan Fluck, Spencer Hansen, James Harter, Marcie Henderson, Greg Horton, Kathleen LaMagna, Andrea McCullough, Sharae Moultrie, Ben Northrup, Rusty Riegelman, Bruce Sabath, Carolyn Seiff, Cliff Sellers, Lauren Alice Smith, Lucy Sorlucco, Tina Stafford, Noah Virgile, Mandarin Wu	Follies	Astoria Performing Arts Center
Outstanding Solo Performance	Valerie Redd	You / Emma	Wandering Bark Theatre Company in association with IRT Theater
Outstanding Actor in a Featured Role	Todd Ritch	The 25th Annual Putnam County Spelling Bee	5th Floor Theatre Company
Outstanding Actress in a Featured Role	LaDonna Burns	Follies	Astoria Performing Arts Center
Outstanding Actor in a Lead Role	Ryan McCurdy	Greencard Wedding	Goode Productions
Outstanding Actress in a Lead Role	Maggie Low	Chickens in the Yard	Adjusted Realists
Outstanding Choreography/Movement	Sara Brians	Follies	Astoria Performing Arts Center
Outstanding Director	Mark Lewis	Danny and the Deep Blue Sea	Sea Dog Theater
Outstanding Lighting Design	Stacey Boggs	AMP	Goode Productions
Outstanding Costume Design	Jennifer A. Jacob	Follies	Astoria Performing Arts Center
Outstanding Set Design	Maruti Evans	Precious Little Talent	Shea Delves Productions
Outstanding Innovative Design	Lisa Renkel (for Projection Design)	Outside Paducah: The Wars at Home	Poetic Theater Productions
Outstanding Original Music	Julian Kytasty, Serhiy Zhadan, & The Dogs	1917-2017:Tychyna, Zhadan & the Dogs	Yara Arts Group in association with La MaMa Experimental Theatre Club
Outstanding Original Short Script	Joseph Hefner	Agency	The Company Ink in association with Michael Johnson
Outstanding Original Full-Length Script	Eric Avilés	Where You From? What You Be About?	Liberation Arts Collective
Outstanding Performance Art Production	Soot and Spit		Our Voices Theater in association with New Ohio Theatre and IRT Theater
Outstanding Production of a Musical	1917-2017:Tychyna, Zhadan & the Dogs		Yara Arts Group in association with LaMaMa Experimental Theater Club
Outstanding Premiere Production of a Play	The Snow Queen		Blessed Unrest in association with New Ohio Theater
Outstanding Revival of a Play	Danny and the Deep Blue Sea		Sea Dog Theater

=== Honorary Awards ===
Award	Recipient
Caffé Cino Fellowship Award	Peculiar Works Project
Ellen Stewart Award	Fractured Atlas
Artistic Achievement Award	Mia Katigbak
Doric Wilson Independent Playwrights Award	Gina Femia
Outstanding Stage Manager	Amy Marin

== 2019 Awards ==
=== Competitive Awards ===
Award	Recipient	Production	Producer
Outstanding Ensemble	Aja Downing, Reggie Herold, Katherine Leidlein, Joseph M. Mace, Rori Nogee, Noah Pyzik, Jae Shin, Anna Stefanic, Brittany Zeinstra	Alex & Eugene	Isle of Shoals Productions, Inc.
Outstanding Original Short Script	Teresa Lotz	She Calls Me Firefly	Parity Productions in association with New Perspectives Theatre Company
Outstanding Original Full Length Script	Madhuri Shekar	Queen	Astoria Performing Arts Center
Outstanding Solo Performance	Kim Katzberg	Dad in a Box	Eat a Radish Productions
Outstanding Director	Sara Thigpen	Twelfth Night	Boomerang Theatre Company
Outstanding Choreography/Movement	Yoshiko Usami	Shinka	Ren Gyo Soh
Outstanding Set Design	Gabriel Firestone	Whirlwind	Jordan's Play Lab in association with Rebecca Crigler & Barn Owl, LLC
Outstanding Lighting Design	Kia Rogers	Real	Rodrigo Nogueira in association with The Tank
Outstanding Sound Design	Aj Surasky-Ysasi	Worse Than Tigers	The Mill in association with New Ohio Theatre
Outstanding Costume Design	Michelle Beshaw	Duke Oldřich & Washerwoman Božena, the True Story	GOH Productions in association with Czechoslovak American Marionette Theatre
Outstanding Original Music	Luis D’Elias	Eight Tales of Pedro	The Secret Theatre
Outstanding Innovative Design	Hao Bai, Eric Marciano & Ildiko Nemeth – for Projection Design	Electronic City	The New Stage Theatre Company
Outstanding Actor in a Leading Role	Harrison Bryan	Spring Awakening	Gallery Players
Outstanding Actress in a Leading Role	Lori Elizabeth Parquet	Operating Systems	Flux Theatre Ensemble
Outstanding Actor in a Featured Role	Federico Mallet	Eight Tales of Pedro	The Secret Theatre
Outstanding Actress in a Featured Role	Meghan E. Jones	Mary, Mary	Retro Productions
Outstanding Performance Art Production	Electronic City		The New Stage Theatre Company
Outstanding Production of a Musical	Spring Awakening		Gallery Players
Outstanding Premiere Production of a Play	Shinka		Ren Gyo Soh
Outstanding Revival of a Play	Stupid Fucking Bird		Stripped Scripts

=== Honorary Awards ===
Award	Recipient
Artistic Achievement Award	Magie Dominic
Stewardship Award	Nicky Paraiso
Caffe Cino Fellowship Award	TOSOS – The Other Side of Silence
Doric Wilson Independent Playwrights Award	Barbara Kahn

== 2020 Awards ==
The 2020 NYIT Awards did not take place due to the COVID-19 Pandemic.

== 2021 Awards ==
=== Honorary Awards ===
Award	Recipient
Artistic Achievement Award	Penny Arcade & Steve Zehentner
Stewardship Award	IndieSpace/The Indie Theater Fund
Caffe Cino Fellowship Award	The Parsnip Ship
Doric Wilson Independent Playwrights Award	Chris Weikel
Indie Theatre Champion Award	Randi Berry, The Episcopal Actors’ Guild of America, Ximena Garnica/LEIMAY, JACK, Latinx Playwrights Circle, Aimee Todoroff
Outstanding Stage Manager Award	Rachel April

== 2022 Awards ==
The 2022 NYIT Awards did not take place due to technical issues and ongoing recovery delays as a result of the COVID-19 pandemic

== 2023 Awards ==
=== Honorary Awards ===
Award	Recipient
Artistic Achievement Award	Everett Quinton
The Ellen Stewart Award	Kelley Nicole Girod
Caffe Cino Fellowship Award	Brownstone Steps Entertainment
Indie Theater Champion Award	Chisa Hutchinson
Outstanding Stage Manager Award	Heather Olmstead

== 2024 Awards ==
=== Honorary Awards ===
Award	Recipient
Artistic Achievement Award	Theresa Linnihan
The Everett Quinton Award	Kevin R. Free
The Ellen Stewart Award	The Muse Project
Caffe Cino Fellowship Award	Houses on the Moon
Indie Theater Champion Award	Rev. Micah Bucey
Outstanding Stage Manager Award	Berit Johnson
