= Peter Nigrini =

American projection designer

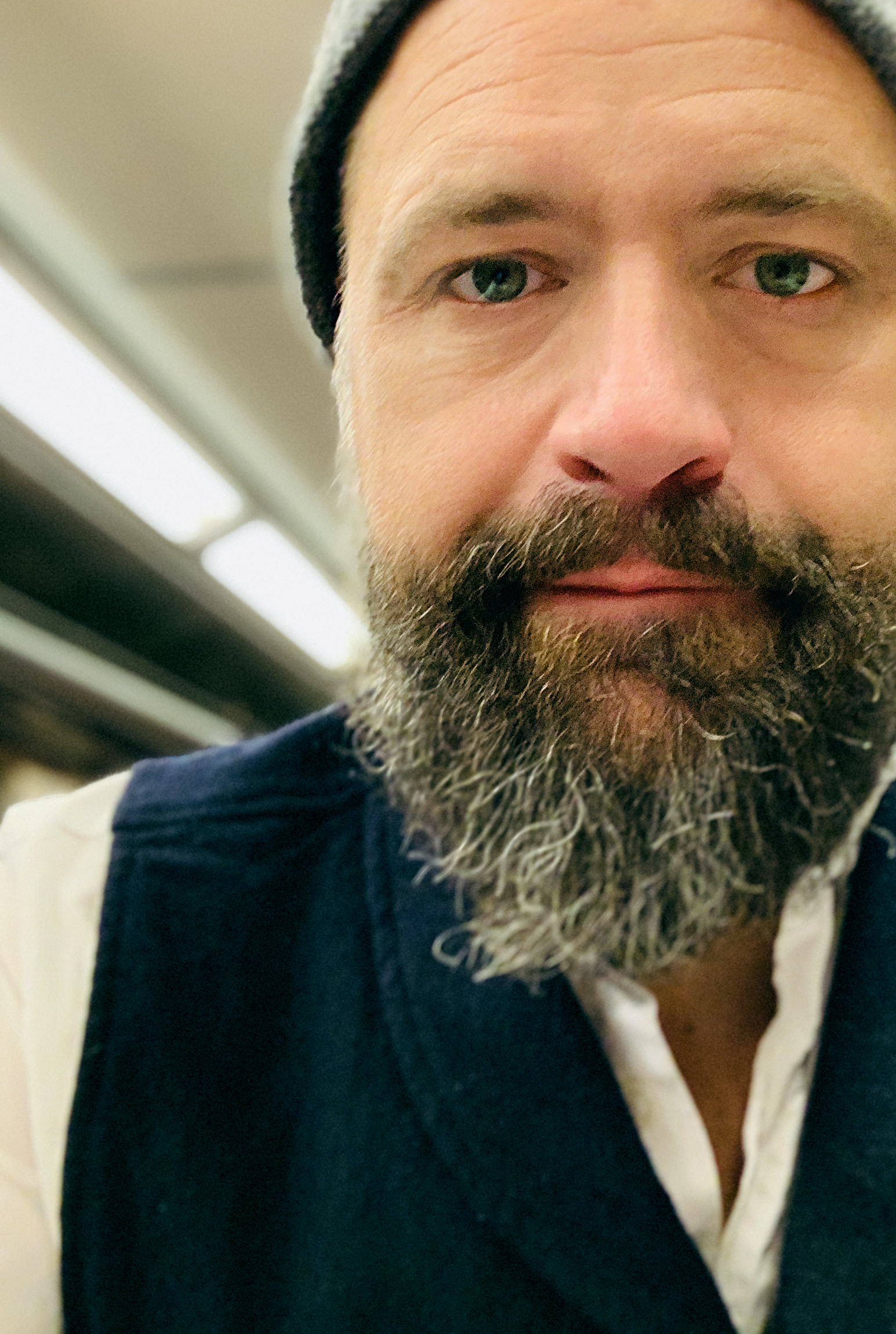
Peter Nigrini in 2018

Peter Nigrini is an American projection designer of live theater. His best-known designs include Dear Evan Hansen, Fela!, and Here Lies Love. He also works occasionally as a scenic and lighting designer, most notably his long standing collaboration with Nature Theater of Oklahoma, of which he is a founding member. He is also a lecturer at New York University

== Education ==
Nigrini earned his bachelor's degree at Dartmouth College and later received a master's degree at the Central St. Martins College of Art (London) in scenography.

== Broadway ==
- Here Lies Love
- MJ the Musical
- Beetlejuice
- Ain't Too Proud
- SpongeBob SquarePants
- A Doll's House, Part 2
- Amélie
- Dear Evan Hansen
- An Act of God
- The Heidi Chronicles
- Fela!
- The Best Man
- 9 to 5: The Musical
- Hell's Kitchen

== Off-Broadway and Regional ==
- Hell's Kitchen - The Public Theater
- The Who's Tommy - Goodman Theatre
- The Ritual of Breath is the Right to Exist - The Hopkins Center for the Arts at Dartmouth, Stanford Live
- Lempicka - La Jolla Playhouse
- Man in the Ring - Huntington Theatre Company
- The Skin of Our Teeth - Theatre for a New Audience
- Wakey Wakey - Signature Theatre Company (New York City)
- Here Lies Love - The Public Theater, Royal National Theatre, Seattle Repertory Theatre
- Grounded - The Public Theater
- Our Lady of Kibeho - Signature Theatre Company
- Far from Heaven - Playwrights Horizons
- Notes from Underground - Yale Repertory Theater
- Autumn Sonata - Yale Repertory Theater
- In a Year of 13 Moons - Yale Repertory Theater
- The Elaborate Entrance of Chad Deity - Second Stage Theatre

== Opera, Music, Dance ==
- Hans Zimmer Live - European Tour
- Deep Blue Sea for the Park Avenue Armory with the Bill T. Jones/Arnie Zane Dance Company
- Orfeo ed Euridice for the Opera Theatre of Saint Louis
- Lucia di Lammermoor for the Santa Fe Opera
- Don Giovanni for the Santa Fe Opera
- Real Enemies at the Brooklyn Academy of Music
- The Grace Jones Hurricane Tour at Hammerstein Ballroom
- Blind Date with the Bill T. Jones/Arnie Zane Dance Company

== Nature Theater of Oklahoma ==
Peter is a founding member of the much lauded New York avant-garde theater troupe Nature Theater of Oklahoma. He is the sole designer for the company and as such is responsible for every visual aspect of their productions. For them he has designed:

- The Poetics: a ballet brut
- No Dice
- Romeo and Juliet
- Rambo Solo
- Life and Times, Episodes 1-9

== Awards and nominations ==
- Tony (nomination) for MJ
- Tony (nomination) for Ain't Too Proud
- Tony (nomination) for Beetlejuice
- Drama Desk Award (nomination) for Beetlejuice
- Outer Critics Circle Award (nomination) for Beetlejuice
- Henry Hewes Award for Dear Evan Hansen
- Outer Critics Circle Award (nomination) for Grounded
- Outer Critics Circle Award (nomination) for Dear Evan Hansen
- Drama Desk Award (nomination) for Dear Evan Hansen
- Lucille Lortel Award for Grounded
- Obie Award for Life and Times
- Obie Award for No Dice
- Henry Hewes Award for Here Lies Love
- Drama Desk Award for Here Lies Love
- Outer Critics Circle Award for The Who's Tommy
- Drama Desk Award for Hell's Kitchen
