= Terry Schreiber =

American theater director and teacher (1937–2026)

Terry Lee Schreiber (March 7, 1937 – April 3, 2026) was an American theater director and acting teacher, who was founder of the T. Schreiber Studio, in New York.

== Background ==
Terry Lee Schreiber was born in Winona, Minnesota, on March 7, 1937. He directed theatre, principally in New York, from 1976, at such venues as the Longacre Theatre, the Circle Repertory Theatre, the Brooks Atkinson Theatre, the Roundabout Theatre, as well as in Japan, regional repertory theatre, and at the Terry Schreiber Studio.

Schreiber continued teaching at his studio until 2022. He died of a heart attack on April 3, 2026, at the age of 89.

== Career ==
Schreiber directed the Tony Award-winning play K2; Devour the Snow; The Trip Back Down, starring John Cullum; and Andorra.

Featured in Eva Mekler's The New Generation of Acting Teachers, Terry Schreiber has been teaching and directing for over 46 years. On Broadway he directed the Tony-nominated play K2, The Trip Back Down starring John Cullum, and Devour the Snow. Off-Broadway his directing credits include Desire Under the Elms at The Roundabout Theatre with Kathy Baker and Feedlot at Circle Repertory with Jeff Daniels.

He directed at regional theatres around the country including The Guthrie Theatre, Syracuse Stage, Hartman Theatre Co., Pittsburgh Public Theatre, Buffalo Arena Stage (directing Celeste Holm and Betty Buckley), and George Street Playhouse. Internationally, Terry has directed numerous American plays in Japan and has taught at the French American Cinema Theatre in Paris. He directed Yasmine B. Rana's The Fallen and Blood Sky and Tennessee Williams' Summer and Smoke, both at the studio.

Other productions at the studio include: Hedda Gabler, Uncle Vanya, The Seagull, Orpheus Descending, The Iceman Cometh, Suddenly Last Summer, Summer and Smoke, Miss Julie, Joe Egg, Hamlet, Of Mice and Men, The Crucible, A Midsummer Night's Dream, The Birthday Party, The Homecoming, How I Learned to Drive, Sweet Bird of Youth, Night of the Iguana, The Real Thing, The Cherry Orchard, The Changing Room, and The Last Days of Judas Iscariot. Terry's first book, Acting: Advanced Technique for the Actor, Director, & Teacher is in its third printing, and his Producing on a Short Shoelace is now available in e-book form and deals with his many years of producing and directing Off-Off Broadway.

== Notable students ==
Notable students include:

- Edward Norton
- Mary Louise Parker
- Julie Halston
- Judith Light
- Cynthia Nixon
- Marc Geller
- Wendy Wasserstein
- Anthony Aibel
- Marian Seldes
- Gerald Schoenfeld
- Betty Buckley
- Amy Ryan
- John Patrick Shanley
- Anne Jackson
- Eli Wallach
- Roger Berlind
- Jonny Orsini

== Publications ==
- Acting: Advanced Techniques for the Actor, Director, and Teacher, Allworth Press, 2005, ISBN 978-1-58115-418-4

== See also ==
- T. Schreiber Studio
