= The Curious Incident of the Dog in the Night-Time (play) =

Play by Simon Stephens, adapted from the novel

- Original language: English
- Written by: Simon Stephens (play); Mark Haddon (novel)
- Characters: Christopher John Francis Boone (15-year-old maths-genius detective); Ed Boone (father); Judy Boone (mother); Siobhan (school mentor); Roger and Eileen Shears (neighbours); Mrs. Alexander (neighbour); Toby (Christopher's pet rat); Wellington (Mrs Shears' dog)
- Subject: Autism spectrum, Family drama, Crime fiction
- Genre: Drama/Mystery
- Setting: Swindon and London

Premiere
- Date: 2 August 2012
- Place: Royal National Theatre

The Curious Incident of the Dog in the Night-Time is a play by Simon Stephens based on the novel of the same name by Mark Haddon. During its 2012 premiere run, the play tied the record for winning the most Olivier Awards (seven), including Best New Play at the 2013 ceremony (this record was surpassed by Harry Potter and the Cursed Child in 2017 with nine wins). The play is a National Theatre Production, in association with Frantic Assembly, who specialised in the movement direction.

The play premiered on 2 August 2012 in the Cottesloe Theatre at the Royal National Theatre in London before transferring to the Apollo Theatre in the West End on 12 March 2013. It won seven Olivier Awards in 2013 (including Best New Play), at the time equaling the record with Matilda the Musical in 2012, before both were surpassed by Harry Potter and the Cursed Child in 2017 with nine awards. During a performance on 19 December 2013, the ceiling of the Apollo Theatre collapsed, which forced the production to close. It reopened on 9 July 2014 at the Gielgud Theatre. The play closed at the Gielgud on 3 June 2017.

The Broadway production debuted at the Ethel Barrymore Theatre on 5 October 2014 and closed on 4 September 2016. It won the 2015 Drama Desk Award for Outstanding Play, 2015 Outer Critics Circle Award Outstanding New Broadway Play, the 2015 Drama League Award for Outstanding Production of a Broadway or Off-Broadway Play, and the 2015 Tony Award for Best Play.

Mickey Rowe was the first openly autistic actor to play Christopher Boone in the Curious Incident of the Dog in the Night-Time. He documented this experience in the book Fearlessly Different: An Autistic Actor's Journey to Broadway's Biggest Stage.

The story concerns a mystery surrounding the death of a neighbour's dog that is investigated by young Christopher Boone, who is autistic. It explores his relationships with his parents and school mentor. The play reworked the source material by changing its voice and presenting the story as a play-within-a-play. The play has received a generally warm reception, with most critics impressed by its ability to convey the point of view of the young protagonist and the compassion of his school mentor. Critics also generally spoke highly of the visual effects employed during the show.

== Characters ==
- Christopher John Francis Boone: the 15-year-old protagonist
- Mr. Ed Boone: Christopher's father, a boiler engineer.
- Mrs. Judy Boone: Christopher's mother.
- Siobhan: Christopher's para-professional and mentor at school. Also acts as the play's narrator.
- Voice One: The actor in this role also plays:
  - Mrs. Shears: Christopher's neighbour.
  - Mrs. Gascoyne: the head of Christopher's school.
  - Woman on Train
  - Shopkeeper
- Voice Two: The actor in this role also plays:
  - Roger Shears: Mrs Shear's ex-husband.
  - Mr. Wise: one of Christopher's neighbours.
  - Duty Sergeant
  - Man behind Counter
  - Drunk One
- Voice Three: The actor in this role also plays:
  - A Policeman
  - Mr. Thompson: one of Christopher's neighbours
  - London Policeman
  - Man with Socks
  - Drunk Two
- Voice Four: The actor in this role also plays:
  - Reverend Peters: a priest and teacher at Christopher's school.
  - Uncle Terry: Christopher's uncle
  - Station Policeman
  - Station Guard
- Voice Five: The actor in this role also plays:
  - No. 37
  - Lady in Street
  - Information
  - Punk Girl
- Voice Six: The actor in this role also plays:
  - Mrs. Alexander: An old lady, one of Christopher's neighbours.
  - Posh Woman
- Toby: Christopher's pet rat, usually played by a real rat in a ball.

== Plot ==
The play involves a significant reworking of the source material. Rather than present the story in the first-person narrative as the original novel did, the play is presented as a reading of Boone's own writing, read aloud in segments by his teacher. The result is that the play is presented as a play-within-a-play.

Set in Swindon and London, the story concerns 15-year-old Christopher John Francis Boone, a mathematical genius with an autism spectrum disorder, although his condition is never specified in the play. The titular curious incident is the mystery surrounding the death of Wellington, his neighbour Mrs. Shears' poodle, after Christopher finds the dog speared with a garden fork.

While trying to discover who killed Wellington, he encounters resistance from many neighbours, but mostly from his widowed father, Ed. Christopher argues to himself that many rules are made to be broken, so he continues to search for an answer. During his investigation, Christopher happens across letters from his mother, Judy, dated after her alleged death. Ed admits that Judy is alive and living in London with their neighbour with whom she had an affair; he had fabricated the story about her dying from a heart attack two years prior. He also admits that he killed Wellington in a fit of fury after an argument with Mrs. Shears.

Distraught and fearing for his life, Christopher heads to London to find and live with his mother, traveling by himself for the first time in his life. He finds the journey overstimulating and stressful, but eventually succeeds and is welcomed by his mother. His ambitions lead him back to Swindon, where he wants to sit an A Level mathematics exam. Christopher achieves the best possible result and gradually reconciles with his father.

In a short scene after the curtain call, Christopher reappears to brilliantly solve his "favourite question" from the mathematics exam.

== Productions ==
Country	Theatre	Opening Date	Closing Date	Details
GBR	Royal National Theatre, London	2 August 2012	27 October 2012	Premiere
GBR	Apollo Theatre, West End	12 March 2013	19 December 2013	West End Premiere
MEX	Teatro de los Insurgentes, Mexico City	24 October 2013	4 January 2015	International Premiere
ISR	Beit Lessin Theater, Tel Aviv	2014		
HUN	Centrál Theatre, Budapest	8 March 2014		Hungarian Premiere
JPN	Setagaya Public Theater, Tokyo	4 April 2014	20 April 2014	Japanese Premiere
GBR	Gielgud Theatre, West End	9 July 2014	3 June 2017	West End Re-Opening
USA	Ethel Barrymore Theatre, Broadway	5 October 2014	4 September 2016	Broadway Premiere
KOR	Kwanglim Art Center BBCH Hall, Seoul	27 November 2015	31 January 2016	Korean Premiere
CAN	Citadel Theatre, Edmonton, Alberta	22 September 2016	12 November 2016	Canadian Premiere
BEL	Le Moderne Théâtre, Liège	28 April 2017	13 May 2017	Belgian Premiere
AUS	Playhouse, Arts Centre, Melbourne	11 January 2018	25 February 2018	Australian Premiere & Tour
AUS	Concert Hall, QPAC, Brisbane	12 June 2018	24 June 2018	Australian Tour
AUS	Canberra Theatre, Canberra	27 June 2018	1 July 2018	Australian Tour
AUS	Roslyn Packer Theatre, Sydney	4 July 2018	28 July 2018	Australian Tour
AUS	Adelaide Entertainment Centre Theatre, Adelaide	31 July 2018	4 August 2018	Australian Tour
AUS	His Majesty's Theatre, Perth	8 August 2018	19 August 2018	Australian Tour
SPA	Teatro Marquina, Madrid	5 September 2018	TBA	
ZA	Theatre on the Bay, Cape Town	25 September 2018	3 November 2018	South African Premiere & Tour
ZA	Pieter Toerien Montecasino Theatre and Studio	7 November 2018	2 December 2018	South African Tour
GBR	Piccadilly Theatre, West End	29 November 2018	27 April 2019	West End revival
BEL	De Speling, Fakkeltheater Antwerpen	6 December 2024	22 December 2024	Flemish Premiere

=== National Theatre ===
Adapted by Simon Stephens and directed by Marianne Elliott, the show premièred at the Royal National Theatre's Cottesloe Theatre on 2 August 2012. The performance there was played in the round. The production starred Luke Treadaway as Christopher, Niamh Cusack as his inspirational teacher Siobhan, Nicola Walker as his mother Judy, Paul Ritter as his father Ed and Una Stubbs as Mrs. Alexander. The production, which ran until late October 2012, was broadcast live to cinemas worldwide on Thursday 6 September 2012 through the National Theatre Live programme.

=== West End ===
The show transferred to the West End's Apollo Theatre in March 2013. Performances began on 1 March, with an official opening on 12 March. Seán Gleeson and Holly Aird joined the cast as Christopher's parents.

On 19 December 2013, during a performance, part of the Apollo Theatre's roof collapsed, injuring nearly 80 people. As a result, all further performances were cancelled and a new theatre was sought. The Apollo's balcony required extensive repairs. In February 2014, the producers staged 8 free lunchtime performances for audiences from 14 secondary schools at the Stratford Old Town Hall. The production finally re-opened at the nearby Gielgud Theatre, beginning previews on 24 June 2014, with its official opening night on 9 July.

The West End production closed on 3 June 2017, after playing over 1,600 performances.

The production returned to the West End at the Piccadilly Theatre from 29 November 2018 (with an official opening night on 11 December) for a limited run until 27 April 2019.

=== Broadway ===
The play opened on Broadway at the Ethel Barrymore Theatre on 5 October 2014, after beginning previews on 10 September. It is again produced by the Royal National Theatre and directed by Elliott. The original Broadway cast included Alex Sharp (in his first professional role ever) as Christopher, Enid Graham as his mother Judy, Ian Barford as his father Ed, and Francesca Faridany as Siobhan. The production is choreographed by Scott Graham and Steven Hoggett.

The Broadway production closed on 4 September 2016 after 800 performances.

=== UK Tours ===
The first UK and Ireland tour of the production began in December 2014 at the Lowry Theatre in Salford before completing a 32-city tour across the UK and Ireland.

A second UK and Ireland tour began in Salford in January 2017 and ran through to September 2017.

A third UK tour was set to begin in Salford in September 2020 and run until March 2021, with a seven-week run at the Troubadour Wembley Park Theatre in Wembley, London from November 2020 through to January 2021. Due to the COVID-19 pandemic, it was delayed and began officially at the Troubador Wembley Park Theatre from 20 November 2021 to 9 January 2022 before touring until May 2022.

A new production opened at the Birmingham Rep from September 2026 before embarking on another UK tour. It was the play's first major production since the original National Theatre production. The cast features Charlie Brooks as Judy, Joe McFadden as Ed, and Alex Keenan as Chris (with Imi Price as Alternate Chris), marking the first time the character has been played by a female performer.

=== US tour ===
The first US national tour of the production began on 27 September 2016 at the Auditorium Theatre in Rochester, New York and closed in September 2017 at Segerstrom Center for the Arts, in Costa Mesa, California.

=== International tour ===
The National Theatre opened its first international company in Amsterdam on 22 August 2017 with Joshua Jenkins (with Sam Newton and Kaffe Keating as alternatives at certain performances) as Christopher Boone, Julie Hale as Siobhan, Stuart Laing as Ed and Emma Beattie as Judy. Local producers then brought the production to Toronto, Melbourne, Hong Kong, Singapore, Beijing and Shanghai. Following the success of the Melbourne run, the same production began a national tour of Australia detailed below.

=== Australian tour ===
The Australian premiere of the play took place at the Playhouse, Arts Centre in Melbourne as part of the first international tour. Following the success of the Melbourne season, the same production was announced to return to Australia on a national tour to the remaining major cities: Brisbane, Canberra, Sydney, Adelaide and Perth. The tour commenced on 12 June 2018 and will conclude on 19 August 2018. This is the original London production, produced by the National Theatre in partnership with Lunchbox Productions.

=== Mexico ===
Before it opened on Broadway, it premiered in Mexico in 2013 with the name "El Curioso Incidente del Perro a Medianoche", thus becoming the first international production of the play. Luis Gerardo Méndez played the main character, alternating with Alfonso Dosal. The play ran in Mexico until 2015. This was not the same production as the original UK production.

=== Seoul ===
The third international production of the play played at the Kwanglim Art Center in Seoul, South Korea. Preview shows with the first-ever all Korean cast began on 27 November 2015, and ran until 31 January 2016. It is important to note this is not the same production as the original UK production.

=== South Africa ===
The South African premiere of the play took place in Cape Town, with a transfer to Johannesburg following the initial run. This was a new staging of the play by Paul Warwick-Griffin. The production team also included Gareth Hewitt Williams (lighting design), Tina Driedijk (scenic and costume design), and Charl-Johan Lingenfelder (original music and soundscapes).

=== Switzerland ===
The Swiss amateur English-language premiere of the play took place in Zürich, Switzerland in May 2024. Produced by Zurich English-Speaking Theatre for a limited two week run, with Oli Pont as Christopher Boone, Christina Schwarz as Siobhan, Jim Carson as Ed, and Deborah Somers as Judy, featuring lighting design by Tiina Palojärvi, Andreas Stahl, and Johannes Frohnhofen with original music by Jamie Langridge. The production was directed by Amber Daughtry.

== Historical casting ==
The following tables show the casts of the principal original productions:

Character	London	West End	West End Revival	Broadway	West End Revival	First UK National Tour	Seoul	First US National Tour	Madrid	South Africa
Character	2012	2013	2014		2018	2015		2016	2018	
Christopher	Luke Treadaway	Luke Treadaway	Graham Butler	Alex Sharp	Joshua Jenkins	Joshua Jenkins	Yoon Na Mu, Kim Ryeowook, Jeon Sung-woo	Adam Langdon	Álex Villazán	Kai Brummer
Siobhan Áa	Niamh Cusack	Niamh Cusack	Sarah Woodward	Francesca Faridany	Julie Hale	Geraldine Alexander	Bae Hae Seon, Kim Ji Hyun	Maria Elena Ramirez	Lara Grube	Lesoko Seabe
Ed	Paul Ritter	Seán Gleeson	Nicolas Tennant	Ian Barford	Stuart Laing	Stuart Laing	Kim Young Ho, Shim Hyung Tak	Gene Gillete	Marcial Álvarez	Ashley Dowds
Judy	Nicola Walker	Holly Aird	Emily Joyce	Enid Graham	Emma Beattie	Gina Isaac	Kim Rosa, Yang So Min	Felicity Jones Latta	Mabel del Pozo	Jenny Stead
Voice One Mrs. Shears Mrs. Gascoyne Woman on Train Shopkeeper	Sophie Duval	Sophie Duval	Victoria Willing	Mercedes Herrero	Eliza Collings	Clare Perkins	Han Se Ra	Charlotte Maier	Anabel Maurín	Kate Normington
Voice Two Roger Shears Duty Sergeant Mr. Wise Man behind Counter Drunk One	Nick Sidi	Nick Sidi	Daniel Casey	Richard Hollis	Lucas Hare	Lucas Hare	Kim Dong Hyun, Hwang Sung Hyun	John Hemphill	Boré Buika	Dylan Edy
Voice Three Mr. Thompson Policeman 1 Drunk Two Man with Socks London Policeman	Matthew Barker	Matthew Barker	Paul Stocker	Ben Horner	Craig Stein	Edward Grace	Shin Chang Joo	Brian Robert Burns	Alberto Frías	Clayton Evertson
Voice Four Reverend Peters Uncle Terry Station Policeman Station Guard	Howard Ward	Howard Ward	Tony Turner	David Manis	Sean McKenzie	John McAndrew	Kim Jong Chul	Geoffrey Wade	Eugenio Villota	Nicholas Ellenbogen
Voice Five No. 37 Lady in Street Information Punk Girl	Rhiannon Harper-Rafferty	Rhiannon Harper-Rafferty	Vivienne Acheampong	Jocelyn Bioh	Gemma Knight Jones	Emmanuella Cole	Jo Han Na	Francesca Choy-Kee	Eva Egido	Genna Galloway
Voice Six Mrs. Alexander Posh Woman	Una Stubbs	Tilly Tremayne	Gay Soper	Helen Carey	Lynette Clark	Roberta Kerr	Kang Jung Im	Amelia White	Carmen Mayordomo	Liz Szymczak

Notable replacements at the Apollo included Rakie Ayola as Siobhan, Amanda Drew as Judy and Daniel Casey as Roger Shears. On 13 September 2015 several members of the original Broadway cast performed their last show and were replaced on 15 September with a new cast. For its debut, the Korean production double- or triple-cast almost all of the main characters' roles.

== Original London Creative Team ==
The London production has retained the same creative team since 2012.

Original London Creative Team
Role	Name
Director	Mariane Elliot
Movement	Steven Hogget and Scott Graham of Frantic Assembly
Set and Costume Design	Bunny Christie
Lighting Design	Paule Constable
Video Design	Finn Ross
Sound Design	Ian Dickenson
Composer	Adrian Sutton

== Awards and nominations ==
The nominations for the 2013 Laurence Olivier Awards, which recognise excellence in professional productions staged in London, were announced on 26 March 2013. The production secured the most nominations with eight, including Best New Play, Best Director (Elliott), Best Actor (Treadaway), Best Actress in a Supporting Role, and other categories including Best Set Design, Best Lighting Design, Best Sound Design and Best Choreographer. The production eventually won seven Olivier awards, thereby equalling Matilda the Musical's record win total in 2012. The play was also acclaimed with the Best New Play on 17 February 2013 at the Whatsonstage Awards.

The Play also earned 6 Tony Award nominations in 2015, winning 5, the most of any play that year.

=== West End production ===
Year	Award	Category	Nominee	Result
2013	Laurence Olivier Awards	Best New Play		Won
2013	Laurence Olivier Awards	Best Director	Marianne Elliott	Won
2013	Laurence Olivier Awards	Best Actor	Luke Treadaway	Won
2013	Laurence Olivier Awards	Best Actress in a Supporting Role	Nicola Walker	Won
2013	Laurence Olivier Awards	Best Sound Design	Ian Dickinson and Adrian Sutton	Won
2013	Laurence Olivier Awards	Best Lighting Design	Paule Constable	Won
2013	Laurence Olivier Awards	Best Set Design	Bunny Christie and Finn Ross	Won
2013	Laurence Olivier Awards	Best Theatre Choreographer	Scott Graham and Steven Hoggett	Nominated

=== Broadway production ===
Year	Award	Category	Nominee	Result
2015	Tony Award	Best Play		Won
2015	Tony Award	Best Direction of a Play	Marianne Elliott	Won
2015	Tony Award	Best Actor in a Play	Alex Sharp	Won
2015	Tony Award	Best Lighting Design of a Play	Paule Constable	Won
2015	Tony Award	Best Scenic Design of a Play	Bunny Christie and Finn Ross	Won
2015	Tony Award	Best Choreography	Scott Graham and Steven Hoggett	Nominated
2015	Drama Desk Award	Outstanding Play		Won
2015	Drama Desk Award	Outstanding Actor in a Play	Alex Sharp	Won
2015	Drama Desk Award	Outstanding Director of a Play	Marianne Elliott	Won
2015	Drama Desk Award	Outstanding Lighting Design	Paule Constable	Won
2015	Drama Desk Award	Outstanding Projection Design	Finn Ross	Won
2015	Drama Desk Award	Outstanding Sound Design in a Play	Ian Dickinson for Autograph	Won
2015	Drama League Award	Outstanding Production of a Broadway or Off-Broadway Play		Won
2015	Drama League Award	Distinguished Performance Award	Alex Sharp	Nominated
2015	Outer Critics Circle Award	Outstanding New Broadway Play		Won
2015	Outer Critics Circle Award	Outstanding Director of a Play	Marianne Elliott	Won
2015	Outer Critics Circle Award	Outstanding Set Design	Bunny Christie	Won
2015	Outer Critics Circle Award	Outstanding Lighting Design	Paule Constable	Won
2015	Outer Critics Circle Award	Outstanding Actor in a Play	Alex Sharp	Won
2015	Outer Critics Circle Award	Outstanding Featured Actress in a Play	Francesca Faridany	Nominated

== Critical response ==
=== West End ===
Lyn Gardner of The Guardian wrote a rave review, commenting that "There are times when the show comes perilously close to sentimentality, but the clarity of Christopher's gaze is so unflinching that it often makes you uncomfortable, and the show is equally clear-eyed on the difficulties of parenting, messiness of life, and torment of a child who cannot bear to be touched. ... Leading a fine cast, Luke Treadaway is superb as Christopher, appealing and painful to watch, like the show itself."

Susannah Clapp, of The Observer, wrote in 2013, "The Curious Incident of the Dog in the Night-Time was one of the most original shows and startling successes at the National last year. It's hard to recall the surprise of this... Yet it at first seemed unlikely that Mark Haddon's novel about a boy with a mathematical gift and 'behavioural problems' could possibly work in the theatre." Paul Taylor of The Independent described the work as an "imaginative adaptation" and "brilliant production" saying that it was presented in a "fresh and arresting light" while balancing humor and tragedy. Taylor judged Treadaway's performance superlative citing, among other things, his rhythm, movements and delivery. Matt Wolf of The New York Times added that the play's debut was well-timed in relation to the 2012 London Summer Olympics: "its triumphalist spirit tallies exactly with the mood of this summer's athletic aspirations".

Ben Brantley, the chief theatre critic of The New York Times, wrote: "As directed by Marianne Elliott, working with an inspired set of designers, Christopher's maiden voyage into an alien metropolis becomes a virtuoso study in sensory overload. Those lights, noises, street signs, road maps, random words that spell themselves into being, and, oh yes, that moving staircase that materializes out of nowhere: it all keeps coming at you". Brantley went on to say that the "extraordinary accomplishment" of the play "is that it forces you to look at the world through Christopher's order-seeking eyes. In doing so you're likely to reconsider the dauntless battle your own mind is always waging against the onslaught of stimuli that is life. Scary, isn't it? Exhilarating too."

Charles Spencer of The Daily Telegraph, on the other hand, thought that Siobhan's turning the book Christopher writes into a play "may sound cumbersome but it works superbly". Like others, Spencer praised Treadaway: "He is unbearably poignant in moments of distress when he kneels with his face on the ground and moans, but also movingly captures the character's courage, his brilliance at mathematics, and his startling perspectives on the world ... thanks to Treadaway's pained honesty and twitchy awkwardness, as well as his moments of exultant joy, Christopher Boone feels like both a hero and a friend, though the happy ending is rightly qualified." Spencer also praised Gleason and Cusack.

=== Broadway ===
Richard Zoglin of Time described the play as "a demonstration of the power of theater to transport us to exotic places". Steven Suskin, drama critic for The Huffington Post, said the play entertains, illuminates, and brings us to an exalted new place. Adam Green of Vogue says the play is "a testament to the singular power of theater". Brantley, in his review of the New York production, called the work "manipulative", writing that it "retunes the way you see and hear" by forcing you to embrace a heightened sensory perception along with the main protagonist. Elysa Gardner of USA Today described the experience of viewing the play as a journey "inside Christopher's gifted, troubled mind using inventive visual and sonic effects". She lauded Sharp's "movement, expressions and voice making the boy's terrors and his ferocious intelligence seem equally natural".

Peter Marks of The Washington Post praised the visual graphics of the show as being better presented than the "textual and performance elements" noting that the working of Boone's brain upstaged the detective work of finding the killer. Jennifer Farrar of the Associated Press thought the show a "charming, intricately choreographed and dynamic theatrical experience" and that Alex Sharp's presentation of Christopher exemplifies the life skill of overcoming personal challenge. Deadline Hollywood's Jeremy Gerard felt that the production combines the obsessed math prodigy element of A Beautiful Mind with the mentoring compassion of Billy Elliot. Joe Dziemianowicz of The Daily News found Sharp's performance "dazzling" and "physical and emotionally intense" and praised the design, lighting, music and video displays.

Terry Teachout, drama critic for The Wall Street Journal dissented, describing the "fantastically elaborate video projections" pejoratively, saying that they are smothering. He felt the show was popular because of the trendy nature of Asperger's syndrome and that it was too reliant on trickery. His Wall Street Journal colleague Stefanie Cohen thought the play suffered from difficulty in adapting the book to the stage.
