= Linnebach lantern =

Lensless projection system

A Linnebach lantern or Linnebach projector is a lensless projection system used in theatrical productions. It was developed by (and named after) Adolf Linnebach (1876-1963) around 1917 and was used in North American theatres in the 1920s. Since the middle of the 20th century, it has largely been replaced by other projection technologies.

The lantern consists of a long case that is painted black on the inside. The case contains a high-powered concentrated lamp (such as an arc lamp). One side of the case is a transparent slide with the image that is to be projected. Projection is often done from behind onto a translucent material. A system of lenses can optionally be used to prevent distortion of the projected image. The projector is used for background scenery such as clouds, hills, or city skylines.
