= T. Schreiber Studio =

New York City acting studio

The T. Schreiber Studio is an acting studio located in New York City at 151 West 26th Street.

== History ==
Established in 1969 by Terry Schreiber, the studio was originally run out of a loft on the Upper East Side, holding classes for just a handful of students.

In 1970, the studio got a big boost when its production of The Trip Back Down received favorable reviews, including a rave from then-New York Times drama critic Walter Kerr.

The studio trained actors in the method approach to acting. Its supportive atmosphere and dedication of the students were a few of its primary benefits. Also, the professionalism and helpful, friendly approach of Terry Schreiber drew many students to the studio.

On January 25, 1999, the T. Schreiber Studio was recognized by the Office of the Mayor of the City of New York for "Its dedication to making it possible for New Yorkers to enjoy some of the most talented actors, directors and playwrights. For 30 years T. Schreiber Studio's commitment to the theater arts has made it one of the foremost professional theatre studios and helped make New York City the Theatre Capitol of the World."

== Faculty and students ==
Faculty include or have included, amongst others, Terry Schreiber, Betty Buckley, and Lynn Singer.

Students have included, amongst others, Edward Norton, Anthony Aibel, Maria Bello, James Sayess and Peter Sarsgaard.

== See also ==
- Culture of New York City
- Education in New York City
- Lists of schools
