= Anthony Aibel =

American actor and musical director

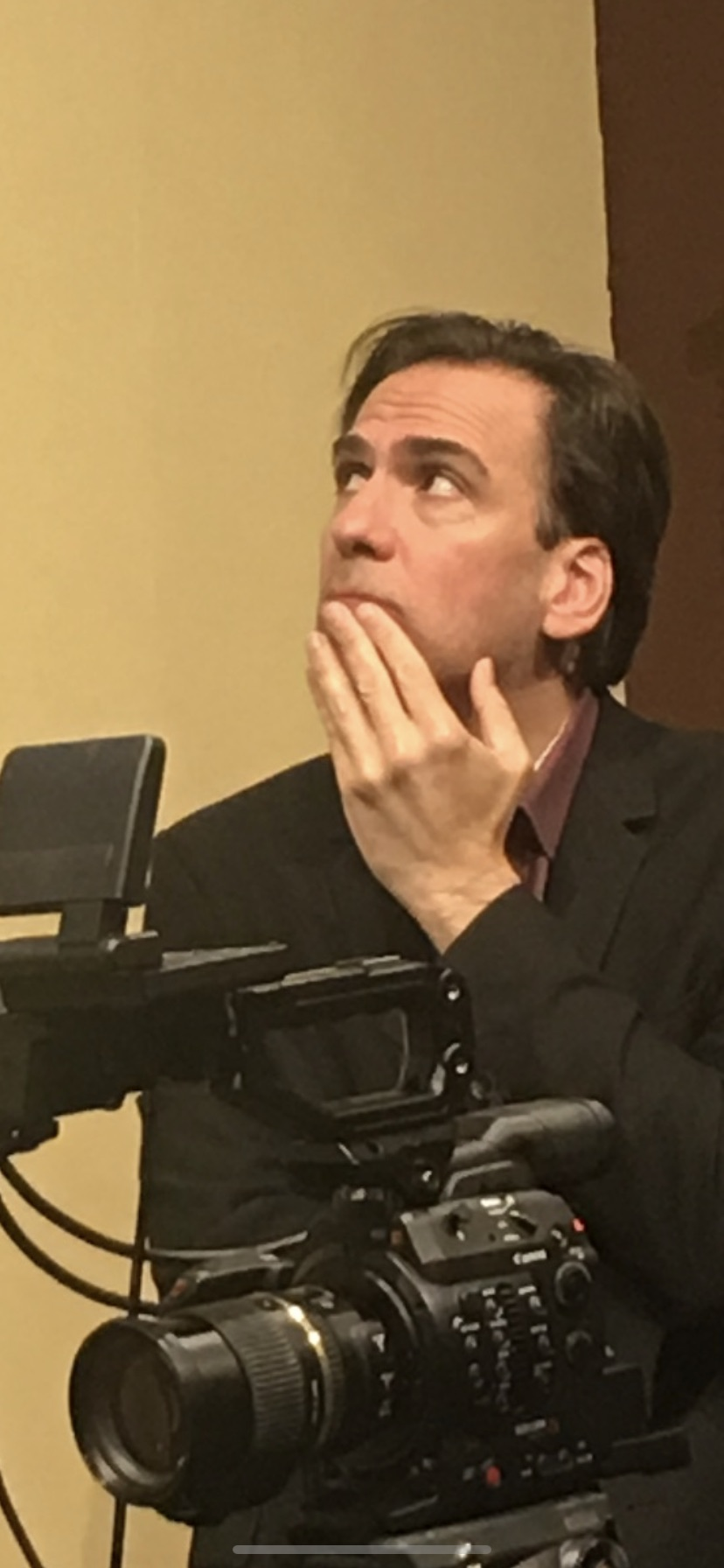
- Born: New York City, NY
- Education: Juilliard School
- Occupations: Director, actor, writer and producer
- Years active: 1991–present
- Children: Alessandro Aibel
- Website: Website

Anthony Aibel is an American director, actor, writer, producer and former musical director. He is recognized for shows he directed at Carnegie Hall and The Kennedy Center.

Aibel was invited to be a guest on Live at Five. He made acting appearances in productions directed by Costa-Gavras and Martin Scorsese. He wrote, produced and acted in a comedy which includes Judd Hirsch.

== Early life and education ==
Aibel was born in New York City to pianist/festival director Olegna Fuschi and pianist Howard Aibel; they are also professors of music.

At the age of six, Aibel landed his first lead role in a play while a student at the Riverdale Country School. He continued getting lead roles in most of the school's plays and musicals, several directed by Emmy winner Ian Ellis James. At age eight, he began to sing professionally in the children's chorus of the Metropolitan Opera, and at age 11, was a vocal soloist at Lincoln Center.

Aibel attended the Juilliard School, where he studied viola, conducting and composition, earning his Master’s Degree in 1992.

Aibel also studied acting for several years at T. Schreiber Studio with Terry Schreiber. Aibel was also accepted into an exchange program with Columbia University, where he studied literature and philosophy, and was accepted into Tanglewood, where he studied with Leonard Bernstein.

== Career ==
At the age of 23, Aibel became one of the youngest professional music directors in the United States. He was a speaker and performer at seven events in Carnegie Hall, and at the Kennedy Center. One show had Aibel leading the soundtrack of John Williams' Star Wars.

Aibel has worked with ICM Artists (now known as ICM Partners) and acted in the Costa-Gavras film Mad City starring Dustin Hoffman. He was also the musical director for Area 31, which received a Grammy Award Nomination for Best Engineered Album, Classical at the 48th Annual Grammy Awards. Anthony Aibel also received an award from the American Society of Composers, Authors and Publishers (ASCAP).

Aibel acted in an episode of HBO’s Boardwalk Empire, directed by Martin Scorsese. In 2014 and 2015, he filled in as a musician on Broadway, performing Bernstein's On the Town at the Lyric Theatre.
