= Video design =

Creative field of stagecraft

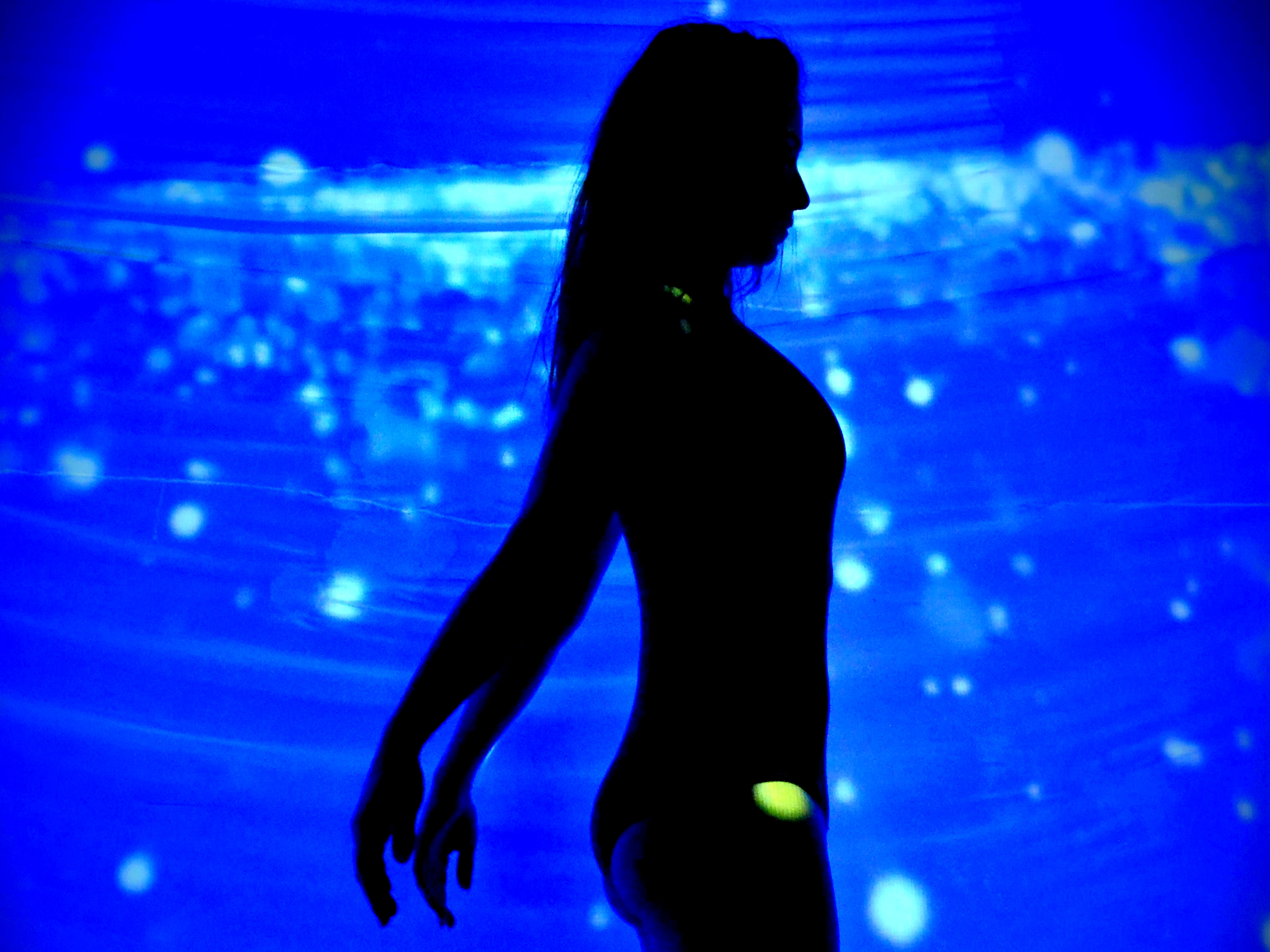
Black light theatre in Prague

Video design or projection design is a creative field of stagecraft. It is concerned with the creation and integration of film, motion graphics and live camera feed into the fields of theatre, opera, dance, fashion shows, concerts and other live events. Video design has only recently gained recognition as a separate creative field becoming an integral tool for engagement and learning while spanning its influence to different realms of intellects such as education. A review conducted by 113 peers between 1992 and 2021 revealed a marked increase in research on video design principles, particularly after 2008. This surge correlates with the proliferation of platforms like YouTube, which have popularized video-based learning. The United Scenic Artists, a union representing designers and scenic artists in the US entertainment industry, added the Global Projection Designer membership category in 2007. Prior to this, the responsibilities of video design would often be taken on by a scenic designer or lighting designer. A person who practices the art of video design is often known as a video designer. However, naming conventions vary worldwide, so practitioners may also be credited as projection designer, media designer, cinematographer or video director (amongst others). As a relatively new field of stagecraft, practitioners create their own definitions, rules and techniques.

== History ==
Filmmaking and video production content has been used in performance for many years, as has large format slide projection delivered by systems such as the PANI projector. The German Erwin Piscator, as stage director at the Berlin Volksbühne in the 1920s, made extensive use of film projected onto his sets. However, the development of digital projection technology in the mid 90s, and the resulting drop in price, made it more attractive and practical to live performance producers, directors and scenic designers. The role of the video designer has developed as a response to this, and in recognition of the demand in the industry for experienced professionals to handle the video content of a production.

United Scenic Artists' Local 829, the Union representing Scenic Artists in the USA has included "Projection Designers" as of mid- 2007. This means anybody working in this field will be doing so officially as "Projection Designer" if he or she is working under a union contract, even if the design utilizes technology other than video projectors. The term "Projection Designer" stems from the days when slide and film projectors were the primary projection source and is now in wide use across North America.

University of the Arts London is the first Master's level course in the UK designed to teach video design exclusively as a specific discipline, rather than embedding it into scenic design. Also, Opera Academy Verona has a Workshop Laboratory from 2009 of Projection Design for Opera and Theatre, Directed by Carlo Saleti, Gianfranco Veneruci and Florian Canga.

In the USA, a number of programs started at about the same time reflecting the growing acceptance of the profession and the need for skilled projection designers. Yale University began a graduate level program in Projection Design in 2010., It's being headed by Wendall K. Harrington. CalArts had their concentration Video For Performance since the mid-2000s and is currently led by Peter Flaherty while UT Austin started the MFA concentration Integrated Media for Live Performance also in 2010. It is being led by Sven Ortel. Both the UT Austin and Yale program are part of an MFA in Design and graduated their first students in 2013.

== Components of video design ==
These component of video design serves as a basic foundation for developing a theatrical play, that mesmerizing and enhances audience's sensory experiences. They include: environment, color, space, scale, movement and sound design.

=== Environment ===
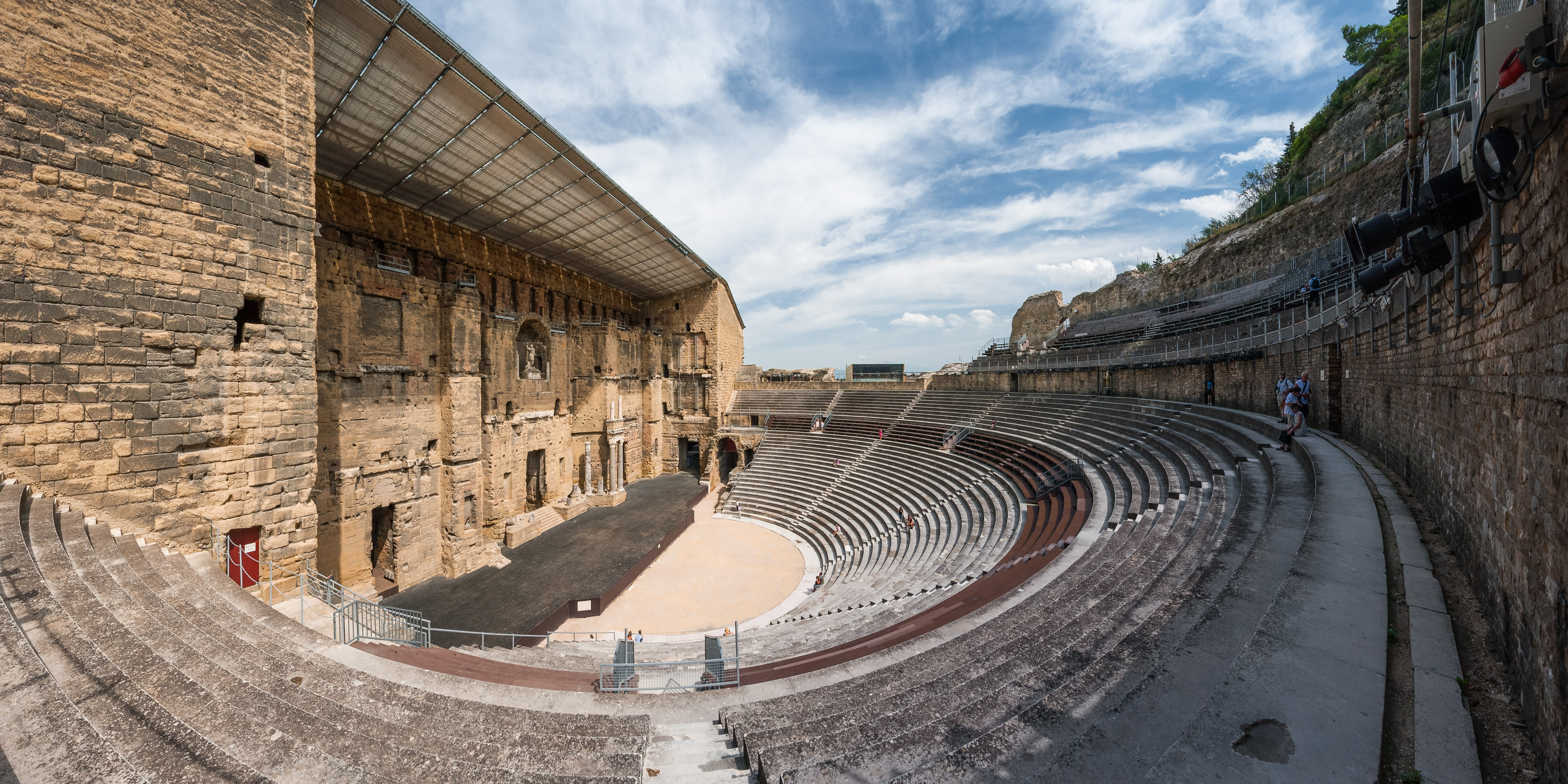
Representation of Environment

This is the canvas video designers are faced with when constructing a compelling story to the audience, as Miroslaw Rogala's describes in her article "Nature Is Leaving Us: A Video Theatre Work", "by implicit contract with the audience, I am promising them a vaster canvas than their predetermined notions of television; I am therefore demanding more from them in terms of their attention and engagement. "By harnessing the physical 2D layer of video projection, designers have the ability to construct a visual field where their artwork is a living-breathing physical manifestation of their idea.

=== Space ===
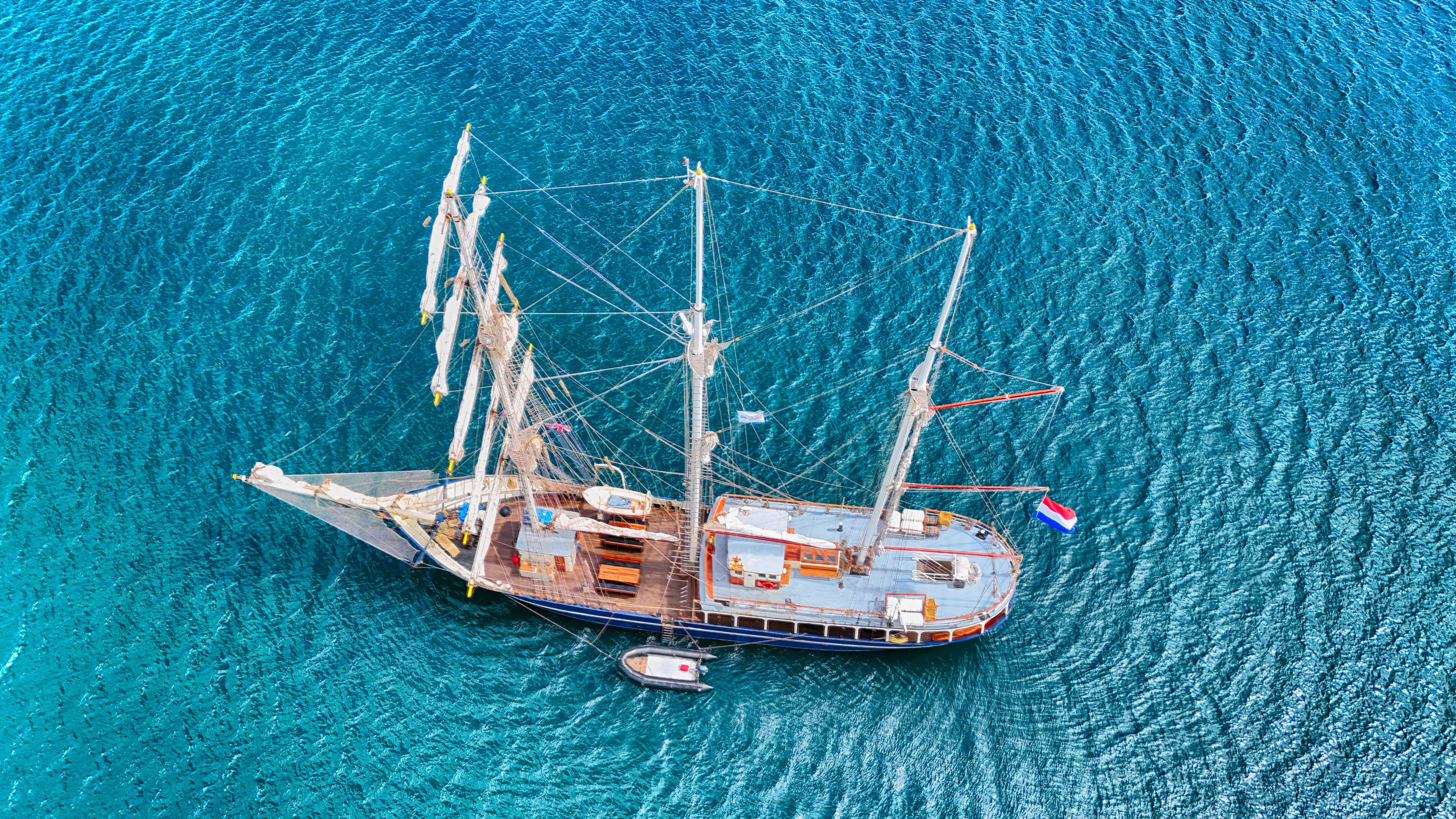
Bird-eyed-view of a boat

This component of video design is describes manipulation of perspective of a play. Rogala breaks these perspectives into 3 namely, "frog-eye-view", "human view" and "bird-eye-view". By tilting the projection or camera along an axis, the designer manipulates the views to create invoke imbalances or invoke an emotion to the audience.

=== Scale ===
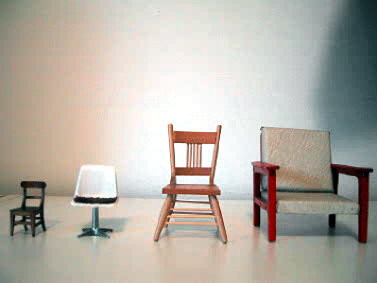
A representation of scale

This is a tool used by a video designer to fit a video projection to multiple screens (or video walls); ranging from small, intimate displays to large video-walls. Doing so, shift the audience's perception of proximity, presence, and importance. Manipulation of scale, allows video designers to disrupt the realism creating a constructive views that contributes to the overall play. According to Rogala, "By altering the scale of the projected images—from close-up facial expressions to full-body silhouettes—we shift the viewer’s perception of spatial relationships and intimacy."

=== Color ===
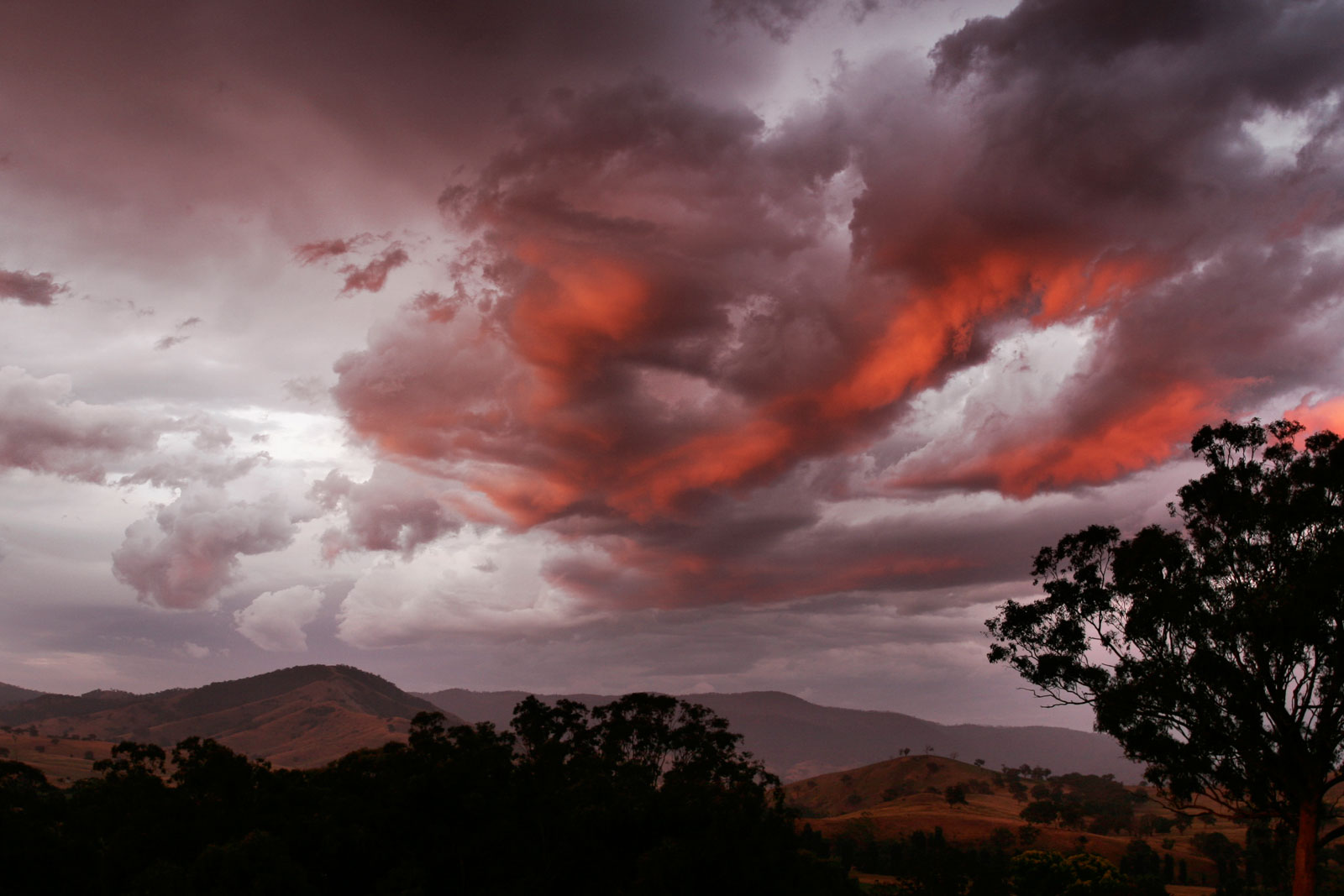
a representation of color

This is a tool used by video designers to invoke emotional response from the audience. According to Parker-Starbuck, "The projected image does not merely serve as a backdrop or setting, but becomes a performative element that interacts with the live body, space, and time, thereby challenging traditional notions of theatrical presence." The use of color in this context serves as a means of creating an immersive experience which ultimately influences audiences' emotion.

=== Movement ===
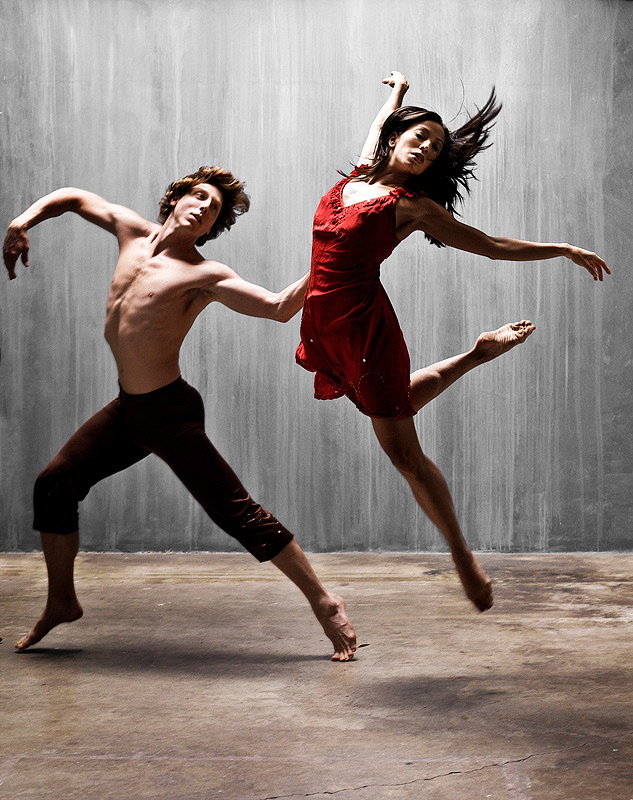
representation of movement

This is a multilayered tool not constrained by just a performers body movements, it extends to camera movements, projection movement as well as transitions medias. as Rogala puts it: "Movement in Nature Is Leaving Us is not confined to the body. It is distributed across multiple visual planes—live, recorded, and projected—producing a spatial rhythm that defies theatrical gravity." It is used by video designers to create fluid, nonlinear experiences to the audience." The transitions between live action and mediated movement are seamless, allowing the viewer to experience a choreography of perception as much as of bodies."

=== Sound environment ===
In Nature is Leaving Us, sound is not treated as just a background or temporal filler. Instead, it is used as a tool to for shaping temporal rhythm and psychological tones. Manipulation of this tool induces a heighten sensory reception of the audience. As Rogala puts it, "digitally altered voices, sampled sounds, and non-linear loops envelop the viewer in a sonic architecture that resists narrative cohesion."

== Roles of the video designer ==
Depending on the production, and due to the crossover of this field with the fields of lighting design and scenic design, a video designer's roles and responsibilities may vary from show to show. A video designer may take responsibility for any or all of the following.

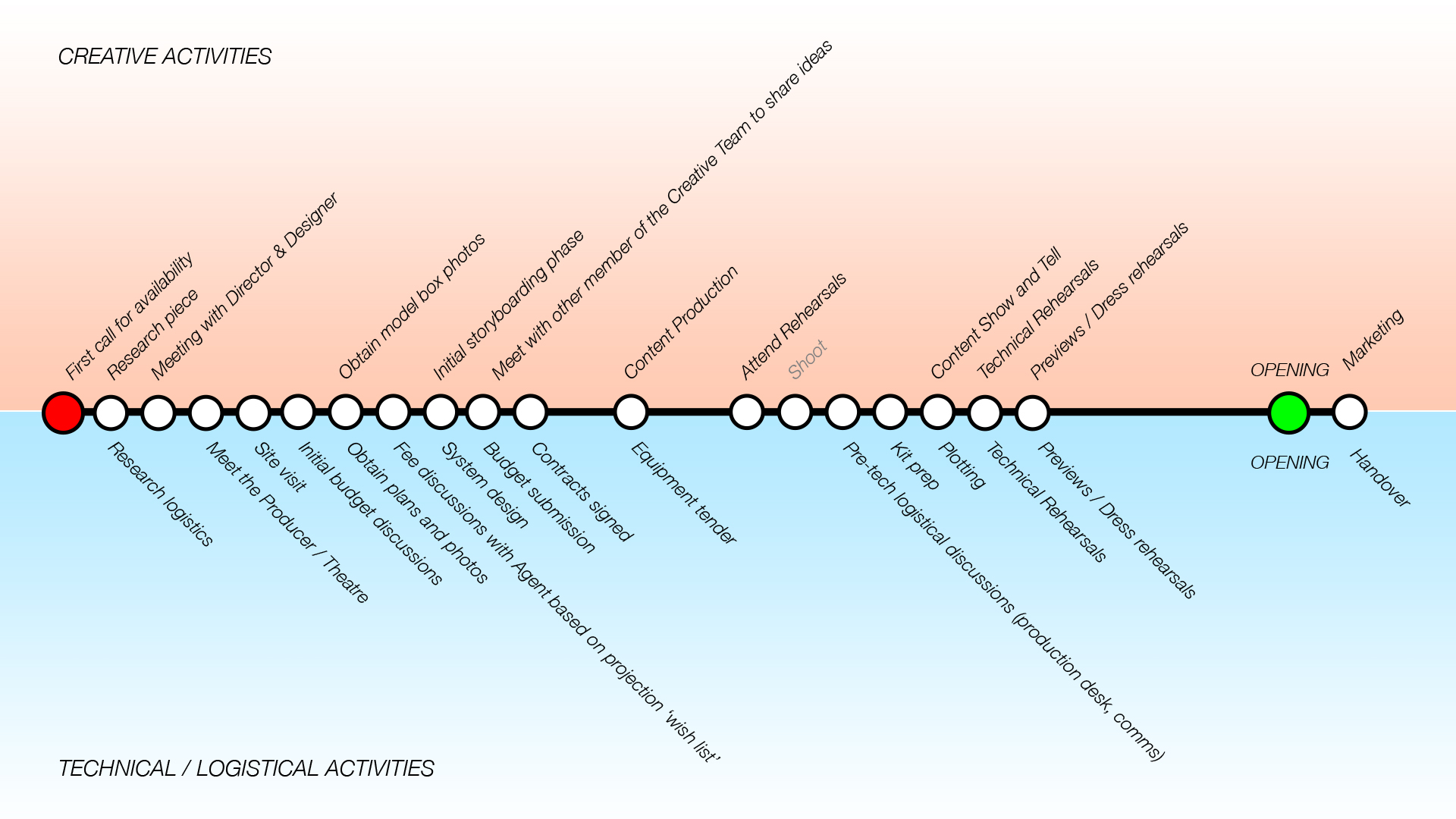
Video Design for Theatre: Production Timeline

- The overall conceptual design of the video content to be included in the piece, including working with the other members of the production team to ensure that the video content is integrated with the other design areas.
- The creation of this video content using 2D and 3D animation, motion graphics, stop motion animation, illustration, filming or any other method.
- The management of live cameras, their signal and how it is used on stage as part of the design.
- The direction, lighting and/or cinematography of any film clips included in the piece.
- The design of the technical system to deliver the video content, including the specification of video projectors, LED displays, monitors and control systems, cabling routes and rigging positions for optimal video effects.
- Managing the budget allocated to video, including the sourcing of display and control technologies, their delivery, maintenance and insurance.

This is a very wide skills base, and it is not uncommon for a video designer to work with associates or assistants who can take responsibility for certain areas. For example, a video designer may conceptually design the video content, but hire a skilled animator to create it, a programmer to program the control system, a production engineer to designer and engineer the control system and a projectionist to choose the optimum projection positions and maintain the equipment.

== Concert video design ==
Concert video design is a niche of the filmmaking and video production industry that involves the creation of original video content intended explicitly for display during a live concert performance.

The creation of visuals for live music performances bears close resemblance to music videos, but are typically meant to be displayed as 'backplate' imagery that adds a visual component to the music performed onstage. However, as the use of video content during musical performances has grown in popularity since the turn of the 21st century, it has become more common to have self-standing 'introductory' and 'interstitial' videos that play on screen on stage without the performers. These pieces may include footage of the artist or artists, shot specifically for the video, and presented onstage with pre-recorded music so that the final appearance is essentially a music video. Such stand-alone videos, however, are typically only viewed in this live setting and may include additional theatrical sound effects.

The earliest concert video visuals likely date to the late 1960s when concerts for artists such as Jimi Hendrix and The Doors featured psychedelic imagery on projection screens suspended behind the performers. Live concert performances took on more and more theatrical elements particularly notable in the concert events put on by Pink Floyd throughout their career.

Laurie Anderson was among the earliest to experiment with video content as part of a live performance, and her ideas and images were a direct inspiration to performers as diverse as David Bowie, Madonna and Kanye West. In 1982, Devo integrated rear-projected visuals into their concert set, choreographing themselves to match and interact with the action on the video for several songs, but the concert that made video content 'standard practice' was the 1993 U2's Zoo TV Tour, conceived and designed by production designer Willie Williams, a collaborator of Laurie Anderson's.

== Technology used in video design ==
Video designers make use of many technologies from the fields of stagecraft, broadcast equipment and home cinema equipment to build a workable video system, including technologies developed specifically for live video and technologies appropriated from other fields. A video system may include any of the following:

- DVD Player
- LED display / Solid state lighting
- Media Server
- Plasma screen
- Video camera
- Vision mixer
- Video projector
- Video server

== See also ==
- Audio electronics
- Liquid light shows
- Live event support
- Live sound mixing
- Rock concert
- Rock festival
- Sound technology
- Stadiums
- Stagecraft
- Theatres
- VJ (video performance artist)
