= So You Think You Can Dance (British TV series) series 1 =

So You Think You Can Dance
- Series 1
- Hosted by: Cat Deeley
- Judges: Nigel Lythgoe; Arlene Phillips; Louise Redknapp; Sisco Gomez; Priscilla Samuels (Auditions)
- Winner: Charlie Bruce

Release
- Original network: BBC
- Original release: 2 January – 13 February 2010

Series chronology
- Next → Series 2

The 1st series of So You Think You Can Dance premiered on 2 January 2010, beginning with one audition show which showed the auditions, choreography camp and introducing the top 14. Five elimination rounds were followed by a final, with performances and results shown on the same night. The winner's prize was the title "Britain's Favourite Dancer", £100,000 and a trip to Hollywood, where the winner would perform in the US series finale.

The finale of the first series was held on 13 February 2010. Robbie White was injured, and could not perform. Lizzie Gough coming third, Tommy Franzén was the season runner-up, but female jazz contestant Charlie Bruce ended up as the winner.

It was also the first series were each contestants have been in the danger zone.

== Judging panel ==
Former Strictly Come Dancing judge and choreographer Arlene Phillips and executive producer and creator of the show Nigel Lythgoe made up the original judging panel for series one. Louise Redknapp, Sisco Gomez and Priscilla Samuels were guest judges during the audition stages, alongside Phillips and Lythgoe.

Singer and dancer Louise Redknapp joined the panel as a permanent judge during the 'choreography camp' stage.

Choreographer and dancer Sisco Gomez became the fourth permanent judge. He joined the panel for the live shows, alongside Redknapp, Phillips and Lythgoe.

== Auditions ==
The preliminary auditions for the first series of the show were held in major cities throughout the UK in October 2009. Participants for the show had to be aged between 18 and 35 and could be amateur dancers or professionals who are not currently engaged in a professional contract. The BBC promoted auditions for the show via its official website.

On 2 January 2010, they aired an audition episode. Audition guest judges were Priscilla Samuels, Sisco Gomez and Louise Redknapp. They showed different dancers all the time, good and bad. First, they showed auditions from London, and then from Manchester.

== Choreography camp ==
The choreography camp is just like the Vegas week in the US. For this part, Louise Redknapp joined Lythgoe and Phillips as a main judge, and the choreographers were judging when the contestants were dancing their choreography. 100 contestants were invited to the Choreography Camp, and after the group choreographies, there were only 26 contestants in the end, and then, they picked out their top 7 female contestants and top 7 male contestants (each gender).

== Challenges ==
Contestants	Style	Music	Choreographer(s)
All	Foxtrot	"Moondance"—Michael Bublé	James Jordan
All	Hip-hop	"Black and Gold"—Sam Sparro	Kate Prince
All	Broadway	"America"—West Side Story (Soundtrack)	Stephen Mear
All	Contemporary	"Happy"—Leona Lewis	Mark Baldwin
All (in groups)	Group choreography	Song picked from a hat	The group
All (individual)	Solo	Song chosen by the contestant	The contestant

== Live Shows ==
=== Top 14 contestants ===
==== Female contestants ====
Contestant	Age	Home town	Dance style	Elimination date
Charlie Bruce	19	Leicester	Jazz	1st place
Lizzie Gough	25	Southampton	Hip-hop	3rd place
Mandy Montanez	31	Maryland, U.S./London	Contemporary jazz	6 February 2010
Yanet Fuentes	27	Cuba	Salsa	30 January 2010
Hayley Newton	26	Guildford	Broadway	23 January 2010
Chloë Campbell	25	Hanwell, London	Jazz	16 January 2010
Anabel Kutay	26	Manchester	Contemporary	9 January 2010

==== Male contestants ====
Contestant	Age	Home town	Dance style	Elimination date
Tommy Franzén	28	Sweden	Hip-hop	2nd place
Robbie White	22	Manchester	Contemporary	Withdrew due to injury
Alastair Postlethwaite	28	Preston	Ballet	6 February 2010
Drew McOnie	24	London	Musical theatre	30 January 2010
Mark Calape	24	Milton Keynes	Hip-hop	23 January 2010
Gavin Tsang	23	Shrewsbury	Contemporary	16 January 2010
Chris Piper	26	London	Contemporary	9 January 2010

==== Elimination chart ====
Key
Female contestant	Male contestant	Bottom two couples/four contestants	Eliminated	Withdrew	Winner	Runner-Up

	Date:	9/1	16/1	23/1	30/1	6/2	13/2
	Contestant	Results					
Top 1	Charlie Bruce				Btm 4		Winner
Top 2	Tommy Franzén			Btm 4			Runner-Up
Top 3	Lizzie Gough					Btm 4	3rd Place
Top 4	Robbie White				Btm 4	Btm 4	Withdrew
Top 6	Alastair Postlethwaite		Btm 2			Elim	
Top 6	Mandy Montanez		Btm 2	Btm 4		Elim	
Top 8	Drew McOnie	Btm 2			Elim		
Top 8	Yanet Fuentes				Elim		
Top 10	Mark Calape			Elim			
Top 10	Hayley Newton	Btm 2		Elim			
Top 12	Gavin Tsang		Elim				
Top 12	Chloë Campbell		Elim				
Top 14	Chris Piper	Elim					
Top 14	Anabel Kutay	Elim					

=== Performance nights ===
==== Week 1 (9 January 2010) ====
- Couple dances:

Couple	Style	Music	Choreographer(s)	Result
Mandy Montanez; Alastair Postlethwaite	Broadway	"I've Got Rhythm"—Bobby Darin	Stephen Mear	Safe
Lizzie Gough; Mark Calape	Lyrical Hip-Hop	"Take a Bow"—Rihanna	Kate Prince	Safe
Anabel Kutay; Drew McOnie	Jive	"Proud Mary"—Tina Turner	Ryan Francois	Anabel Kutay eliminated
Chloë Campbell; Gavin Tsang	Contemporary	"Why"—Annie Lennox	Mark Balowin	Safe
Hayley Newton; Chris Piper	Samba	"Mas Que Nada"—Jorge Ben Jor	Carmen Vincelj	Chris Piper eliminated
Yanet Fuentes; Robbie White	Foxtrot	"Fever"—Michael Bublé	James Jordan	Safe
Charlie Bruce; Tommy Franzén	Hip-Hop	"The Way I Are"—Timbaland feat. Keri Hilson & D.O.E	Simeon Qsyea	Safe

- Group dance: Top 14: "Boogie Woogie Bugle Boy"—Cami Thompson (Broadway; Choreographer: Stephen Mear)
- Musical guest: "The Way Love Goes"—Lemar (with guest dancers Boy Blue Crew)
- Solos:

Contestant	Style	Music	Result
Hayley Newton	Contemporary	"Say"—John Mayer	Safe
Chris Piper	Contemporary	"Dirty Diana"—Michael Jackson	Eliminated
Anabel Kutay	Jazz	"Summertime"—Billie Holiday	Eliminated
Drew McOnie	Jazz	"Luck Be a Lady"—Frank Sinatra	Safe

- Eliminated:
  - Anabel Kutay
  - Chris Piper
- New pairs:
  - Hayley Newton and Drew McOnie

==== Week 2 (16 January 2010) ====
- Couple dances:

Couple	Style	Music	Choreographer(s)	Result
Yanet Fuentes; Robbie White	Hip-Hop	"Boom Boom Pow"—The Black Eyed Peas	Kenrick Sandy	Safe
Chloë Campbell; Gavin Tsang	Broadway	"Too Darn Hot"—Ann Miller	Karen Bruce	Both eliminated
Hayley Newton; Drew McOnie	Contemporary	"Speechless"—Lady Gaga	Rafael Bonachela	Safe
Mandy Montanez; Alastair Postlethwaite	Cha-Cha	"I Like It Like That"—Peter Rodrigues	Carmen Vincelj	Bottom 2
Charlie Bruce; Tommy Franzén	Pop-jazz	"Everybody in Love"—JLS	Frank Gatson	Safe
Lizzie Gough; Mark Calape	Viennese Waltz	"Have You Ever Really Loved A Woman?"—Bryan Adams	Katya Virshilas	Safe

- Group dance: Top 12: "Ain't No Other Man"—Christina Aguilera (Jazz; Choreographer: Frank Gatson)
- Musical guest: Broken Heels - Alexandra Burke
- Solos:

Contestant	Style	Music	Result
Chloë Campbell	Jazz	"Fever"—Patti Drew	Eliminated
Gavin Tsang	Contemporary	"Dare You To Move"—Switchfoot	Eliminated
Mandy Montanez	Jazz	"Drumming Song"—Florence + the Machine	Safe
Alastair Postlethwaite	Ballet	"You Gotta Move"—The Rolling Stones	Safe

- Eliminated:
  - Chloë Campbell
  - Gavin Tsang

==== Week 3 (23 January 2010) ====
- Group dances:

Contestants	Style	Music	Choreographer(s)
Top 5 female contestants	Bollywood	"Jai Ho (You Are My Destiny)"—A. R. Rahman & The Pussycat Dolls	Frank Gatson
Top 5 male contestants	Broadway	"Jet Song" from West Side Story	Tyce Diorio
Top 10	Hip-Hop	"Pump It"—The Black Eyed Peas	Simeon Qsyea

- Couple dances:

Couple	Style	Music	Choreographer(s)	Result
Lizzie Gough; Drew McOnie	Disco	"Disco Inferno"—The Trammps	Karen Bruce	Safe
Mark Calape; Mandy Montanez	Contemporary	"Show Me Heaven"—Maria McKee	Henri Oguike	Mark Calape eliminated Mandy Montanez in bottom 4
Yanet Fuentes; Tommy Franzén	Salsa	"La Malanga"—Eddie Palmieri	Richard Marcel	Tommy Franzén in bottom 4
Alastair Postlethwaite; Hayley Newton	Hip-Hop	"Forever"—Chris Brown	Simeon Osyea	Hayley Newton eliminated
Charlie Bruce; Robbie White	Contemporary	"This Woman's Work"—Maxwell	Tyce Diorio	Safe

- Musical guest: "One Shot"—JLS
- Top 8 contestants’ solos: (the contestants that got into the bottom 4, performed the same solo again)

Contestant	Style	Music	Result
Charlie Bruce	Jazz	"Pop"—'N Sync	Safe
Robbie White	Contemporary	"This Is Your Life"—Switchfoot	Safe
Hayley Newton	Jazz	"Supermassive Black Hole"—Muse	Eliminated
Alastair Poslethwaite	Ballet	"Any Other World"—Mika	Safe
Lizzie Gough	Popping	"Comptine d'un autre été : L'après-midi"—Yann Tiersen	Safe
Drew McOnie	Broadway	"Zing! Went the Strings of My Heart"—Judy Garland	Safe
Mandy Montanez	Jazz	"Cruel Intentions"—Simian Mobile Disco feat. Beth Ditto	Bottom 4
Mark Calape	Lyrical Hip-Hop	"If I Ain't Got You"—Alicia Keys	Eliminated
Yanet Fuentes	Salsa	"Crazy"—Pitbull feat. Lil Jon	Safe
Tommy Franzén	Breakdance	"Beggin'"—Madcon	Bottom 4

- Eliminated:
  - Hayley Newton
  - Mark Calape

==== Week 4 (30 January 2010) ====
- Group dances:

Contestants	Style	Music	Choreographer(s)
Top 4 female dancers	Broadway	"Move (You're Steppin' on My Heart)" from Dreamgirls	Stephen Mear
Top 4 male dancers	Ballet	"Swan Lake"	Matthew Bourne
Top 8	Pop-jazz	"Relight My Fire (Element Remix)"—Take That	Gareth Walker

- Couple dances:

Couple	Style	Music	Choreographer(s)	Result
Yanet Fuentes; Robbie White	Lindy Hop	"It Doesn't Mean a Thing (If it Ain't Got That Swing)"—Billy Banks	Ryan Francois	Yanet Fuentes eliminated Robbie White in bottom 4
Charlie Bruce; Drew McOnie	Lyrical hip-hop	"Doesn't Mean Anything"—Alicia Keys	Kate Prince	Charlie Bruce in bottom 4 Drew McOnie eliminated
Lizzie Gough; Alastair Postlethwaite	Contemporary	"No Air (Acoustic)"—Jordin Sparks & Chris Brown	Rafael Bonachela	Safe
Mandy Montanez; Tommy Franzén	Broadway	"Gotta Be Something Better Than This"— Sweet Charity	Stephen Mear	Safe

- Top 8 contestant’s solos: (the contestant that got into the bottom 4, performed the same solo again)

Contestant	Style	Music	Result
Alastair Postlethwaite	Ballet	"Get It On"—T.Rex	Safe
Lizzie Gough	Hip-Hop	"Poker Face"—Lady Gaga	Safe
Tommy Franzén	Locking	"Blame It on the Boogie"—Michael Jackson	Safe
Mandy Montanez	Contemporary	"Kissing You"—Des'ree	Safe
Robbie White	Contemporary	"Wherever You Will Go"—The Calling	Bottom 4
Yanet Fuentes	Salsa	"Let's Get Loud"—Jennifer Lopez	Eliminated
Drew McOnie	Broadway	"Call Me"—Blondie	Eliminated
Charlie Bruce	Contemporary	"Apologize"—Timbaland feat. OneRepublic	Bottom 4

- Musical guest: "Blame It on the Girls"—Mika
- Eliminated:
  - Yanet Fuentes
  - Drew McOnie

==== Week 5 (6 February 2010) ====
- Couple dances:

Couple	Style	Music	Choreographer(s)	Result
Lizzie Gough; Robbie White	Broadway	"Hot Honey Rag" from Chicago	Karen Bruce	Bottom 4
Lizzie Gough; Robbie White	Hip-Hop	"Mad"—Ne-Yo	Simeon Qsyea	Bottom 4
Mandy Montanez; Alastair Postlethwaite	Contemporary	"Fix You"—Coldplay	Lynne Page	Both eliminated
Mandy Montanez; Alastair Postlethwaite	Paso Doble	"Dies Irae"—Karl Jenkins	Katya Virshilas	Both eliminated
Charlie Bruce; Tommy Franzén	Jazz	"Circus"—Britney Spears	Sean Cheesman	Safe
Charlie Bruce; Tommy Franzén	Quickstep	"Do Your Thing"—Basement Jaxx	Karen Hardy	Safe

- Solos: (the contestants that got into the bottom 4, performed the same solo again)

Contestant	Style	Music	Result
Charlie Bruce	Jazz	"Conga"—Gloria Estefan	Safe
Lizzie Gough	Lyrical Hip-Hop	"Bleeding Love"—Leona Lewis	Bottom 4
Alastair Postlethwaite	Ballet	"Tetsujin" from The Matrix Revolutions	Eliminated
Tommy Franzén	Breakdance	Variations from Song and Dance (Andrew Lloyd Webber)	Safe
Robbie White	Contemporary	"She's So Lovely"—Scouting For Girls	Bottom 4
Mandy Montanez	Contemporary	"Feeling Good"—Michael Bublé	Eliminated

- Group dance: Top 6: "Big Spender (Wild Oscar Mix)"—Shirley Bassey (Broadway; Choreographer: Karen Bruce)
- Musical guest: "I Got You"—Leona Lewis
- Eliminated:
  - Mandy Montanez
  - Alastair Postlethwaite

==== Week 6 (Finale) (13 February 2010) ====
- Group dance:

Contestants	Style	Music	Choreographer(s)
Top 3	Pop-Jazz	"I Gotta Feeling"—The Black Eyed Peas	Frank Gatson
Top 13	Jazz	"Bad Romance (Bimbo Jones Remix)"—Lady Gaga	Gareth Walker

- Couple dances:

Couple	Style	Music	Choreographer(s)
Lizzie Gough; Tommy Franzén	Jazz	"Sweet Dreams (Are Made of This)"—Eurythmics	Mandy Moore
Charlie Bruce; Lizzie Gough	Broadway	"All That Jazz"—Catherine Zeta-Jones	Karen Bruce
Charlie Bruce; Tommy Franzén	Tango	"Tango el Roxanne"—Ewan McGregor	Katya Virshilas
Lizzie Gough (contestant); Alastair Postlethwaite (non-competing)	Samba	"Magalenha"—Sérgio Mendes	Ryan Francois
Mark Calape (non-competing); Tommy Franzén (contestant)	Hip-Hop	"Harder, Better, Faster, Stronger"—Daft Punk	Simeon Qsyea
Charlie Bruce (contestant); Drew McOnie (non-competing)	Lyrical	"I Surrender"—Celine Dion	Mandy Moore

- Solos:

Contestant	Style	Music
Lizzie Gough	Hip-Hop	"Don't Stop the Music"—Rihanna
Tommy Franzén	Breakdance	"Cry Me A River"—Justin Timberlake
Charlie Bruce	Jazz	"Livin' la Vida Loca"—Ricky Martin

- The judges' favourite routine of the season: Hayley Newton and Drew McOnie: "Speechless"—Lady Gaga (Contemporary; Choreographer: Rafael Bonachela)
- Musical guest: "Morning Sun" Robbie Williams
- Places:
  - 3rd place: Lizzie Gough
  - Runner-up: Tommy Franzén
  - Winner: Charlie Bruce

== Ratings ==
Overnight ratings are taken from Digital Spy and official ratings are taken from BARB.

Show	Date	Overnight ratings (millions)	Share	Official ratings (millions)	Source
Auditions	2 January	6.44	27.4%	6.70	
Live Show 1	9 January	6.87	26.7%	7.13	
Results 1	9 January	5.18	20.4%	—	
Live Show 2	16 January	5.59	23.9%	5.80	
Results 2	16 January	5.49	21.3%	5.69	
Live Show 3	23 January	5.81	25.2%	5.96	
Results 3	23 January	5.38	22.2%	5.62	
Live Show 4	30 January	4.62	20.7%	4.83	
Results 4	30 January	4.76	20.0%	4.95	
Live Show 5	6 February	4.99	21.2%	5.21	
Results 5	6 February	4.82	20.5%	5.07	
The Final	13 February	5.31	22.1%	5.52	
The Final Results	13 February	5.31	22.1%	6.02	
Series average	2010				
"—" denotes where information is currently unavailable
