= So You Think You Can Dance (British TV series) series 2 =

So You Think You Can Dance
- Series 2
- Hosted by: Cat Deeley
- Judges: Nigel Lythgoe; Arlene Phillips; Louise Redknapp; Sisco Gomez; Alexandra Burke (Auditions); John Barrowman (Week 6)
- Winner: Matt Flint

Release
- Original network: BBC
- Original release: 26 March – 11 June 2011

Series chronology
- ← Previous; Series 1

The second and final series of So You Think You Can Dance began on 26 March 2011 and ended on 11 June 2011. Tapper Matt Flint took first place and the title "Britain's Favourite Dancer", as well as a prize package including £50,000 and a trip to Hollywood, where he performed in the American series' eighth season finale.

== Auditions ==
The show hosted auditions in Manchester on 17 October 2010, Glasgow on 19 October 2010 and in London on 21 and 22 October, according to the BBC website; contestants could also audition in Cardiff and Belfast.

== Judging panel ==
Sisco Gomez, Louise Redknapp, Nigel Lythgoe and Arlene Phillips all returned to the judging panel for series two. Singer and The X Factor series 5 winner Alexandra Burke appeared as a guest judge during the audition stages. Singer and actor John Barrowman appeared as a guest judge during week six of the live shows, in place of Lythgoe.

== Finals ==
=== Top 20 dancers ===
==== Female contestants ====
| Contestant | Age | Home Town | Dance Style | Eliminated |
|---|---|---|---|---|
| Kirsty Swain | 29 | Sutton, London | Jazz | 3rd Place |
| Katie Love | 24 | Worcester | Contemporary | 4th Place |
| Bethany Rose Harrison | 20 | Devon | Jazz | 4 June 2011 |
| Charlotte Scally | 19 | Watford, Hertfordshire | Jazz | 28 May 2011 |
| Katrina Lyndon | 20 | Plymouth | Ballet | 21 May 2011 |
| Danielle Cato | 24 | Farnborough, Hampshire | Contemporary | 14 May 2011 |
| Rithiely "Rithy" Pereira | 19 | São Paulo, Brazil | Hip-hop | 14 May 2011 |
| Alice Woodhouse | 23 | Lancaster | Contemporary | 7 May 2011 |
| Stephanie Powell | 27 | Poole, Dorset | Latin | 30 April 2011 |
| Paige Smith | 18 | Wolverhampton | Disco | 23 April 2011 |

==== Male contestants ====
| Contestant | Age | Home town | Dance Style | Eliminated |
|---|---|---|---|---|
| Matt Flint | 29 | Scarborough | Tap | Winner |
| Luke Jackson | 30 | Leicester | Jazz | Runner-up |
| Lee Bridgman | 21 | Plymouth | Jazz | 4 June 2011 |
| Israel Donowa | 18 | London | Hip-Hop | 28 May 2011 |
| Tom Shilcock | 23 | Leicester | Tap | 21 May 2011 |
| Lee Crowley | 20 | Cwmbran | B-boy | 14 May 2011 |
| Shane Collard | 24 | Perth, Australia | Contemporary | 14 May 2011 |
| Charlie Wheeller | 19 | Southampton | B-Boy/Contortion | 7 May 2011 |
| Gian Luca Loddo | 32 | Sardinia, Italy | Contemporary | 30 April 2011 |
| Ryan Jenkins | 28 | Isle of Wight | Contemporary | 23 April 2011 |

==== Elimination chart ====
Key
| Male Contestant | Female Contestant | Bottom Group | Eliminated |

| | Date: | 23/4 | 30/4 | 7/5 | 14/5 | 21/5 | 28/5 | 4/6 | 11/6 |
| | Contestant | Results | | | | | | | |
| Top 4 | Matt Flint | | | | | | | | Winner |
| Top 4 | Luke Jackson | | | | Btm 3 | | | Btm 4 | Runner-Up |
| Top 4 | Kirsty Swain | | | | | | | | 3rd Place |
| Top 4 | Katie Love | | | | Btm 3 | | | Btm 4 | 4th Place |
| Top 6 | Lee Bridgman | | | | | | Btm 4 | Elim | |
| Top 6 | Bethany Rose Harrison | | | | | Btm 2 | Btm 4 | Elim | |
| Top 8 | Israel Donowa | | | | | Btm 2 | Elim | | |
| Top 8 | Charlotte Scally | | | | | | Elim | | |
| Top 10 | Tom Shilcock | | | | | Elim | | | |
| Top 10 | Katrina Lyndon | | | | | Elim | | | |
| Top 14 | Lee Crowley | | | | Elim | | | | |
| Top 14 | Danielle Cato | | | | Elim | | | | |
| Top 14 | Shane Collard | | Btm 2 | Btm 2 | Elim | | | | |
| Top 14 | Rithiely Pereira | | Btm 2 | Btm 2 | Elim | | | | |
| Top 16 | Charlie Wheeller | | | Elim | | | | | |
| Top 16 | Alice Woodhouse | | | Elim | | | | | |
| Top 18 | Gian Luca Loddo | Btm 2 | Elim | | | | | | |
| Top 18 | Stephanie Powell | Btm 2 | Elim | | | | | | |
| Top 20 | Ryan Jenkins | Elim | | | | | | | |
| Top 20 | Paige Smith | Elim | | | | | | | |

== Performance nights ==
=== Week 1 (16 April 2011) ===
- Group dances:

| Group | Style | Music | Choreographer(s) |
|---|---|---|---|
| Bethany Rose Harrison; Katie Love; Luke Jackson; Shane Collard | Jazz | "Bring Me To Life"—Evanescence | Paul Domaine |
| Charlie Wheeller; Israel Donowa; Lee Crowley; Rithy Pereira | Hip-Hop | The Archers theme tune mix "It's Like That"—Run-D.M.C. vs. Jason Nevins | Kate Prince; Tommy Franzen |
| Danielle Cato; Gian Luca Loddo; Katrina Lyndon; Stephanie Powell | Contemporary | "Bridge Over Troubled Water"—Andrea Bocelli | Mandy Moore |
| Charlotte Scally; Lee Bridgman; Matt Flint; Paige Smith; Tom Shilcock | Broadway | "The Tap Combination/"I Can Do That" from A Chorus Line "Anything Goes" from Anything Goes | Karen Bruce |
| Alice Woodhouse; Kirsty Swain; Ryan Jenkins | Contemporary | "Crazy"—Alice Russell | Sarah Boulter |

Top 20: "Don't Stop The Music"—Rihanna (Jazz; Choreographer: Mandy Moore)
Top 10 Boys: "It's A Man's Man's Man's World"—James Brown (Contemporary; Choreographer: Sarah Boulter)
Top 10 Girls: "Fighter"—Christina Aguilera" (Lyrical jazz; Choreographer: Kevan Allen)

- No eliminations were scheduled for this week.

=== Week 2 (23 April 2011) ===
- Group dance (Top 20): "Toxic"—Britney Spears (Yael Naim cover) (Jazz; Choreographer: Beth Honan)
- Couple dances:

| Couple | Style | Music | Choreographer(s) | Result |
|---|---|---|---|---|
| Stephanie Powell; Ryan Jenkins | Commercial | "On the Floor"—Jennifer Lopez feat. Pitbull | Paul Domaine | Ryan Jenkins eliminated |
| Charlotte Scally; Matt Flint | Foxtrot | "The Way You Look Tonight"—Maroon 5 | Chris & Jaci | Safe |
| Katie Love; Lee Crowley | Lyrical Hip-Hop | "Starry Eyed"—Ellie Goulding | Kate Prince | Safe |
| Rithiely 'Rithy' Pereira; Shane Collard | Broadway | "Sparkling Diamonds"—Nicole Kidman | Karen Bruce | Safe |
| Alice Woodhouse; Charlie Wheeller | Contemporary | "Amazed"—Lonestar | Mandy Moore | Safe |
| Paige Smith; Gian Luca Loddo | Jazz | "Forget You"—Cee Lo Green | Mandy Moore | Paige Smith eliminated |
| Danielle Cato; Luke Jackson | Samba | "Livin' la Vida Loca"—Ricky Martin | Chris & Jaci | Safe |
| Katrina Lyndon; Tom Shilcock | Hip-Hop | "The Time (Dirty Bit)"—The Black Eyed Peas | Simeon Qsyea | Safe |
| Kirsty Swain; Lee Bridgman | Contemporary | "Turning Tables"—Adele | Sarah Boulter | Safe |
| Bethany Rose Harrison; Israel Donowa | Disco | "One Night Only"—Dreamgirls | Karen Bruce | Safe |

- Musical guest: "Feeling Good"—Jennifer Hudson
- Solos:

| Contestant | Style | Music | Result |
|---|---|---|---|
| Stephanie Powell | Samba | "Conga"—Gloria Estefan | Safe |
| Ryan Jenkins | Contemporary | "Shake Your Groove Thing"—Peaches and Herb | Eliminated |
| Paige Smith | Disco | "Firework"—Katy Perry | Eliminated |
| Gian Luca Loddo | Contemporary | "Lacrimosa" from Mozart's Requiem in D Minor | Safe |

- Eliminated:
  - Ryan Jenkins
  - Paige Smith
- New partners:
  - Stephanie Powell and Gian Luca Loddo

=== Week 3 (30 April 2011) ===
- Group dance (Top 18): "River Deep Mountain High" by Tina Turner (Royal Wedding-themed; Choreographer: Mandy Moore)
- Couple dances:

| Couples | Style | Music | Choreographer(s) | Result |
|---|---|---|---|---|
| Charlotte Scally; Matt Flint | Jazz | Relax—Frankie Goes to Hollywood | Mandy Moore | Safe |
| Katie Love; Lee Crowley | Contemporary | Try Sleeping with a Broken Heart—Alicia Keys | Katrin Hall | Safe |
| Kirsty Swain; Lee Bridgman | Bollywood | Hindi Sad Diamonds—Nicole Kidman | Ash Mukherjee | Safe |
| Bethany Rose Harrison; Israel Donowa | Hip-Hop | OMG—Usher feat. will.i.am | Simeon Qsyea | Safe |
| Stephanie Powell; Gian Luca Loddo | Cha-Cha-Cha | When I Grow Up—The Pussycat Dolls | Katya Virshilas | Both Eliminated |
| Katrina Lyndon; Tom Shilcock | Broadway | Footloose— from Footloose | Karen Bruce | Safe |
| Alice Woodhouse; Charlie Wheeller | American Smooth Waltz | Three Times A Lady—Commodores | Katya Virshilas | Safe |
| Rithiely 'Rithy' Pereira; Shane Collard | Hip-Hop | Turkish March—Mozart | Supple | Bottom 2 |
| Danielle Cato; Luke Jackson | Commercial | Mamma Knows Best—Jessie J | Sean Cheesman | Safe |

- Musical guest: "I Can"—Blue
- Solos:

| Contestant | Style | Music | Result |
|---|---|---|---|
| Stephanie Powell | Jive | Proud Mary—Tina Turner | Eliminated |
| Gian Luca Loddo | Contemporary | Kissing You—Des'ree | Eliminated |
| Rithiely 'Rithy' Pereira | Hip-Hop | Hold It Against Me—Britney Spears | Safe |
| Shane Collard | Contemporary | Seven Nation Army—The White Stripes | Safe |

- Eliminated:
  - Stephanie Powell
  - Gian Luca Loddo

=== Week 4 (7 May 2011) ===
- Group dance (Top 16): "You Can't Stop the Beat" from Hairspray (Broadway; Choreographer: Karen Bruce)
- Couple dances:

| Couple | Style | Music | Choreographer(s) | Result |
|---|---|---|---|---|
| Danielle Cato; Luke Jackson | Paso Doble | "Tetsujin" – Juno Reactor vs Don Davis | Karen Hardy | Safe |
| Bethany Rose Harrison; Israel Donowa | Contemporary | "Someone Like You" – Adele | Javier De Frutos | Safe |
| Alice Woodhouse; Charlie Wheeller | Hip-Hop | "Power" – Kanye West | Kenrick Sandy | Both eliminated |
| Katie Love; Lee Crowley | Jazz | "Tilt Ya Head Back" – Nelly feat. Christina Aguilera | Sean Cheesman | Safe |
| Katrina Lyndon; Tom Shilcock | Quickstep | "Let Me Entertain You" – Robbie Williams | Karen Hardy | Safe |
| Kirsty Swain; Lee Bridgman | Lyrical hip hop | "Just the Way You Are" – Bruno Mars | Simeon Qsyea | Safe |
| Rithiely 'Rithy' Pereira; Shane Collard | Commercial | "Slow" – Kylie Minogue | Sean Cheesman | Bottom 2 |
| Charlotte Scally; Matt Flint | Broadway | "Sing, Sing, Sing (With a Swing)" – Louis Prima | Bill Deamer | Safe |

- Musical guest: "Gold Forever"/"All Time Low"/"Heart Vacancy" Medley – The Wanted
- Solos:

| Contestant | Style | Music | Result |
|---|---|---|---|
| Rithy Pereira | Hip hop | "Cosmic Love" – Florence and the Machine | Safe |
| Shane Collard | Contemporary | "Red" – Daniel Merriweather | Safe |
| Alice Woodhouse | Contemporary | "Hurt" – Christina Aguilera | Eliminated |
| Charlie Wheeller | Contortion break dance | "Kickstarts" (Dubstep Remix) – Example | Eliminated |

- Eliminated:
  - Alice Woodhouse
  - Charlie Wheeller

=== Week 5 (14 May 2011) ===
- Group dance (Top 14): "Born This Way" – Lady Gaga (Jazz; Choreographer: Tyce Diorio)
- Couple dances:

| Couple | Style | Music | Choreographer(s) | Result |
|---|---|---|---|---|
| Charlotte Scally; Matt Flint | Lindy Hop | "Shout And Feel It"-Count Basie | Ryan Francois | Safe |
| Danielle Cato; Luke Jackson | Lyrical hip hop | "Impossible"-Shontelle | Kenrick | Danielle Cato eliminated |
| Bethany Rose Harrison; Israel Donowa | Commercial | "Hide U"-Kosheen | Sean Cheesman | Safe |
| Rithiely 'Rithy' Pereira; Shane Collard | Contemporary | Theme from "Titanic" | Tyce Diorio | Both eliminated |
| Katie Love; Lee Crowley | Broadway | "The Lady is a Tramp"-The cast of 'Glee' | Karen Bruce | Lee Crowley eliminated |
| Katrina Lyndon; Tom Shilcock | Hip hop | "Yeah 3x"-Chris Brown | Supple | Safe |
| Kirsty Swain; Lee Bridgman | Argentine Tango | "Libertango"-Astor Piazzolla | Miriam Larici & Leonardo Barrionuevo | Safe |

- Musical guest: "Nobody's Perfect" – Jessie J
- Solos:

| Contestant | Style | Music | Result |
|---|---|---|---|
| Katie Love | Contemporary | "Take It All" – Adele | Safe |
| Luke Jackson | Contemporary | "Written in the Stars" – Tinie Tempah | Safe |
| Rithy Pereira | Hip hop | "Telephone" – Lady Gaga and Beyoncé | Eliminated |
| Danielle Cato | Contemporary | "Cry Me a River" – Michael Bublé | Eliminated |
| Shane Collard | Contemporary | "Are You The One?" – The Presets | Eliminated |
| Lee Crowley | B-boy | "Frisky" – Tinie Tempah | Eliminated |

- Eliminated:
  - Danielle Cato
  - Shane Collard
  - Lee Crowley
  - Rithy Pereira
- New partners:
  - Katie Love and Luke Jackson

=== Week 6 (21 May 2011) ===
- Group dance (Top 10): "Work" – Kelly Rowland (Commercial; Choreographer: Beth Honan)
- Couple dances:

| Couples | Style(s) | Music | Choreographer(s) | Result |
|---|---|---|---|---|
| Katrina Lyndon; Tom Shilcock | Salsa | "Ran Kan Kan" – Tito Puente | Chris & Jaci | Both eliminated |
| Katrina Lyndon; Tom Shilcock | Jazz | "Summertime" – Sylvester | Tyce Diorio | Both eliminated |
| Bethany Rose Harrison; Israel Donowa | Lyrical Hip-Hop | "Love the Way You Lie" – Rihanna | Kate Prince | Bottom 2 |
| Bethany Rose Harrison; Israel Donowa | Charleston | "Shake that Thing" – Vince Giordano and The Nighthawks | Ryan Francois | Bottom 2 |
| Charlotte Scally; Matt Flint | Disco | "You Should Be Dancing" – from Saturday Night Fever | Karen Bruce | Safe |
| Charlotte Scally; Matt Flint | Contemporary | "Wild Horses" – Charlotte Martin | Tyce Diorio | Safe |
| Kirsty Swain; Lee Bridgman | Broadway | "Aquarius" – Sasha Allen Tribe from Hair | Tyce Diorio | Safe |
| Kirsty Swain; Lee Bridgman | Hip Hop | "Pass Out" – Tinie Tempah | Kenrick | Safe |
| Katie Love; Luke Jackson | Commercial | "Who's That Chick?" – David Guetta ft. Rihanna | Mandy Moore | Safe |
| Katie Love; Luke Jackson | Viennese Waltz | "She's Always a Woman" – Billy Joel | Artem Chigvintsev | Safe |

- Musical guest: "Notorious" – The Saturdays
- Solos:

| Contestant | Style | Music | Result |
|---|---|---|---|
| Katrina Lyndon | Ballet | "Don Quixote Act 1, Quiteria's Variation" – Sofia National Opera Orchestra | Eliminated |
| Tom Shilcock | Tap | "Rockin' Robin" – Michael Jackson | Eliminated |
| Bethany Rose Harrison | Jazz | "She Wants To Move" – N.E.R.D. | Safe |
| Israel Donowa | Hip hop | "Show Me Love" – Steve Angello and Laidback Luke feat. Robin S. | Safe |

- Eliminated:
  - Katrina Lyndon
  - Tom Shilcock

=== Week 7 (28 May 2011) ===
- Group dances:
  - Top 8: "Rolling in the Deep" – Adele (Contemporary; Choreographer: Katrin Hall)
  - Girls: "Dr Feelgood" – Aretha Franklin (Jazz; Choreographer: Sean Cheesman)
  - Boys: "Another One Bites the Dust" – Queen (Jazz; Choreographer: Mandy Moore)
- Couple dances:

| Couple | Style | Music | Choreographer(s) | Result |
|---|---|---|---|---|
| Katie Love; Israel Donowa | Broadway | "Roxie" – Renée Zellweger from 'Chicago' | Tyce Diorio | Katie Love safe Israel Donowa eliminated |
| Charlotte Scally; Lee Bridgman | Contemporary | "Unchained Melody" – The Righteous Brothers | Mandy Moore | Charlotte Scally eliminated Lee Bridgman bottom 4 |
| Bethany Rose Harrison; Luke Jackson | Hip hop | "Let You Go" – Chase & Status ft. Mali | Simeon Qysea | Bethany Rose Harrison bottom 4 Luke Jackson safe |
| Kirsty Swain; Matt Flint | Rumba | Liberian Girl" – Michael Jackson | Chris & Jaci | Both safe |

- Solos:

| Contestant | Style | Music | Result |
|---|---|---|---|
| Bethany Rose Harrison | Jazz | "Fix You" – Coldplay | Bottom 4 |
| Luke Jackson | Contemporary | "Supermassive Black Hole" – Muse | Safe |
| Kirsty Swain | Jazz | "Candyman" – Christina Aguilera | Safe |
| Matt Flint | Tap | "I Wish" – Stevie Wonder | Safe |
| Katie Love | Contemporary | "Seduces Me" – Celine Dion | Safe |
| Israel Donowa | Hip hop | "Move (If You Wanna)" – Mims | Eliminated |
| Charlotte Scally | Jazz | "Don't Stop Me Now" – Queen | Eliminated |
| Lee Bridgman | Jazz | "Fashion" – David Bowie | Bottom 4 |

- Musical guest: "Don't Stop the Party" – Black Eyed Peas
- Bottom 4 Solos:

| Contestant | Style | Music | Result |
|---|---|---|---|
| Bethany Rose | Jazz | "Layla" – Derek & the Dominos | Safe |
| Israel Donowa | Hip Hop | "I'll Die" – Floetry | Eliminated |
| Charlotte Scally | Jazz | "Listen" – Beyoncé | Eliminated |
| Lee Bridgman | Jazz | "Whole Lotta Love" – Led Zeppelin | Safe |

- Eliminated:
  - Charlotte Scally
  - Israel Donowa

=== Week 8 (4 June 2011) ===
- Group dances:
  - Top 6: "Yes" – Merry Clayton (TBA; Choreographer: TBA)
  - Girls: "The Rose" – Bette Midler (Contemporary; Choreographer: Mandy Moore)
  - Boys: "He's a Pirate" from 'Pirates of the Caribbean' (Paso Doble; Choreographer: Katya Virshilas)
- Couple dances:

| Couple | Style | Music | Choreographer(s) | Result |
|---|---|---|---|---|
| Bethany Rose Harrison; Lee Bridgman | Cha-Cha-Cha | "Judas" – Lady Gaga | Artem Chigvintsev | Both eliminated |
| Katie Love; Matt Flint | Contemporary | "Total Eclipse of the Heart" – Bonnie Tyler | Mandy Moore | Katie Love bottom 4 Matt Flint safe |
| Kirsty Swain; Luke Jackson | Broadway | "Varsity Drag" – Ann Morrison | Bill Deamer | Kirsty Swain safe Luke Jackson bottom 4 |

- Solos:

| Contestant | Style | Music | Result |
|---|---|---|---|
| Kirsty Swain | Jazz | "Feeling Good" – Nina Simone | Safe |
| Luke Jackson | Contemporary | "The Flood" – Take That | Bottom 4 |
| Bethany Rose Harrison | Jazz | "Beautiful Disaster" – Kelly Clarkson | Eliminated |
| Lee Bridgman | Jazz | "So What'cha Want" – Beastie Boys | Eliminated |
| Katie Love | Contemporary | "Stairway to Heaven" – Mary J. Blige | Bottom 4 |
| Matt Flint | Tap | "Butterfly" – Jason Mraz | Safe |

- Group dance: "Proud Mary" – The cast of 'Glee (TV series)' (Broadway; Choreographer: Bill Deamer)
- Musical guest: "Still Got Tonight" – Matthew Morrison
- Bottom 4 Solos:

| Contestant | Style | Music | Result |
|---|---|---|---|
| Katie Love | Contemporary | "Then You Look at Me" – Celine Dion | Safe |
| Luke Jackson | Contemporary | "I'm Not Alone" – Calvin Harris | Safe |
| Bethany Rose Harrison | Jazz | "Man in the Mirror" – Michael Jackson | Eliminated |
| Lee Bridgman | Jazz | "Army of Me" – Björk | Eliminated |

- Eliminated:
  - Bethany Rose Harrison
  - Lee Bridgman

=== Week 9 (Final) (11 June 2011) ===
- Group dances:
  - Top 4: "Don't Stop Me Now" – Queen (Pop Jazz; Choreographer: TBA)
  - Top 2 Boys: "Puttin' On the Ritz" – Fred Astaire (Broadway Tap; Choreographer: Bill Deamer)
  - Top 2 Girls: "Defying Gravity" – from Wicked (Broadway; Choreographer: Karen Bruce)
- Couples dance 1:

| Couple | Style | Music | Choreographer(s) |
|---|---|---|---|
| Matt Flint; Katie Love | Jazz | "Heads Will Roll" – Yeah Yeah Yeahs | Mandy Moore |
| Kirsty Swain; Luke Jackson | Contemporary | "Nothing Compares 2 U" – Sinéad O'Connor | Javier De Frutos |

- Solos:

| Contestant | Style | Music |
|---|---|---|
| Kate Love | Contemporary | "Run" – Leona Lewis |
| Matt Flint | Tap | "Ain't Got No, I Got Life" – Nina Simone |
| Kirsty Swain | Jazz | "I'm a Slave 4 U" – Britney Spears |
| Luke Jackson | Contemporary | "Love Don't Let Me Go (Walking Away)" – David Guetta |

- Couples dance 2:

| Couple | Style | Music | Choreographer(s) | Result |
|---|---|---|---|---|
| Katie Love; Luke Jackson | Tango | "I've Seen That Face Before (Libertango)" – Grace Jones | Artem Chigvintsev | Katie Love Fourth; Luke Jackson runner-up |
| Kirsty Swain; Matt Flint | Foxtrot | "Heaven" (Yanou's Candlelight Mix) – DJ Sammy | Katya Virshilas | Kirsty Swain Third; Matt Flint winner |

- Top 20 Group dance: "Party Rock Anthem" – LMFAO feat. Lauren Bennett & GoonRock (Jazz; Choreographer: Mandy Moore)
- Musical guest: "On The Floor" – Jennifer Lopez feat. Pitbull
- Eliminated:
  - Katie Love
  - Kirsty Swain
- Runner-Up:
  - Luke Jackson
- Winner:
  - Matt Flint

== Ratings ==
Overnight ratings are taken from Digital Spy and official ratings are taken from BARB.

| Show | Date | Overnight ratings (millions) | Share | Official ratings (millions) | Source |
|---|---|---|---|---|---|
| Auditions 1 | 26 March | 4.87 | 22.6% | 5.06 | |
| Auditions 2 | 2 April | 3.81 | 20.7% | – | |
| Auditions 3 | 9 April | 3.43 | 20.1% | – | |
| Showcase Special | 16 April | 3.63 | 18.0% | – | |
| Live Show 1 | 23 April | 3.56 | 19.8% | 3.81 | |
| Results 1 | 23 April | 2.98 | 13.8% | — | |
| Live Show 2 | 30 April | 3.06 | 16.7% | – | |
| Results 2 | 30 April | 3.15 | 13.9% | — | |
| Live Show 3 | 7 May | 3.47 | 17.0% | – | |
| Results 3 | 7 May | 3.28 | 14.2% | — | |
| Live Show 4 | 14 May | 2.71 | 16.2% | – | |
| Results 4 | 14 May | 3.06 | 14.2% | — | |
| Live Show 5 | 21 May | 2.59 | 16.9% | – | |
| Results 5 | 21 May | 2.94 | 15.2% | — | |
| Live Show 6 | 28 May | 2.59 | 15.7% | – | |
| Results 6 | 28 May | 2.42 | 10.8% | — | |
| Live Show 7 | 4 June | 2.23 | 13.3% | – | |
| Results 7 | 4 June | 2.22 | 9.7% | — | |
| The Final | 11 June | 3.45 | 18.1% | – | |
| The Final Results | 11 June | 3.39 | 16.9% | 3.65 | |
| Series average | 2011 | | | | |
"—" denotes where information is currently unavailable
