= Charlie Bruce =

British dancer

- Born: Charlotte Bruce; 1990; Melton Mowbray, Leicestershire, England
- Occupation: Dancer
- Known for: Winning the UK version of So You Think You Can Dance

Charlotte "Charlie" Bruce is a British jazz dancer from Cropston, Leicestershire, who won the first UK series of So You Think You Can Dance in February 2010. She trained in dance at Tring Park School for the Performing Arts (previously the Arts Educational School Tring) and both dance and musical theatre at Laine Theatre Arts, a performing arts college in Epsom, Surrey. She was the youngest contestant in SYTYCD.

== Biography ==
Born in Melton Mowbray and raised in Cropston, north of Leicester, Bruce began dancing at the age of three, taking lessons from the age of seven at the Charnwood Dance School, and receiving a scholarship to attend the Arts Educational School in Tring, Hertfordshire, between the ages of ten and sixteen. She later studied at the Laine Theatre Arts school in Epsom.

She began dating British Gold Medallist Gymnast Louis Smith in November 2017, in September 2020 it was confirmed that she was pregnant and in a gender reveal video on social media they discovered they were in fact expecting a baby girl, Charlie revealed that she was due in late February 2021.

== Career ==
=== 2010: SYTYCD ===
When Charlie was 19 years old, while working as a sales assistant in a shoe shop, she attended an audition for So You Think You Can Dance. She got through to the top 100, and then to the televised stages as one of the top 14. She has said on numerous occasions that she wanted to be seen as more than a 19-year-old girl dancing, and at the end of the final all of the judges thought that she had accomplished that. She won the contest, receiving £100,000 prize money.

Week	Partner(s)	Style	Music	Choreographer(s)	Results
1	Tommy Franzén	Hip-Hop	"The Way I Are"—Timbaland feat. Keri Hilson & D.O.E	Simeon Qsyea	Safe
2	Tommy Franzén	Pop-Jazz	"Everybody in Love"—JLS	Frank Gatson	Safe
3	—	Solo (Jazz)	"Pop"—'N Sync	—	Safe
3	Robbie White	Lyrical	"This Woman's Work"—Maxwell	Tyce Diorio	Safe
4	Drew McOnie	Lyrical Hip-Hop	"Doesn't Mean Anything"—Alicia Keys	Kate Prince	Bottom 4
4	—	Solo (Contemporary)	"Apologize"—Timbaland feat. OneRepublic	—	Bottom 4
5	Tommy Franzén	Jazz	"Circus"—Britney Spears	Sean Cheesman	Safe
5	Tommy Franzén	Quickstep	"Do Your Thing"—Basement Jaxx	Karen Hardy	Safe
5	—	Solo (Latin Jazz)	"Conga"—Gloria Estefan	—	Safe
6	Lizzie Gough	Broadway	"All That Jazz"—Catherine Zeta-Jones	Karen Bruce	Winner
6	Tommy Franzén	Tango	"Tango el Roxanne"—Ewan McGregor	Katya Virshilas	Winner
6	Drew McOnie	Lyrical	"I Surrender"—Céline Dion	Mandy Moore	Winner
6	—	Solo (Jazz)	"Livin' la Vida Loca"—Ricky Martin	—	Winner

=== After So You Think You Can Dance ===
In July 2010, Bruce began working as understudy for the lead role of Baby Houseman in the West End production of Dirty Dancing at the Aldwych Theatre, making her debut performance in the role that month. On 12 August 2010, she performed on the series finale of FOX's So You Think You Can Dance in the United States.

== Second World Dance championship ==
In May 2010, Bruce represented the United Kingdom in the Second Dance World Championship in Mexico, where she was partnered by Benjamin Jones. She withdrew from the competition in Week 3 (31 May) due to an injury. Her replacement was Lizzie Gough. However, team England was eliminated from the competition in Week 4 (6 June).
