= Strictly Come Dancing series 7 =

Strictly Come Dancing
- Series 7
- Presented by: Bruce Forsyth; Tess Daly; Ronnie Corbett (guest); Claudia Winkleman (guest)
- Judges: Alesha Dixon; Len Goodman; Craig Revel Horwood; Bruno Tonioli; Darcey Bussell (guest)
- Celebrity winner: Chris Hollins
- Professional winner: Ola Jordan
- No. of episodes: 19

Release
- Original network: BBC One
- Original release: 18 September – 19 December 2009

Series chronology
- ← Previous; Series 6 Next → Series 8

Strictly Come Dancing returned for its seventh series on 18 September 2009 on BBC One. Bruce Forsyth and Tess Daly returned as presenters of the main show on BBC One, while Claudia Winkleman presented the spin-off show Strictly Come Dancing: It Takes Two on BBC Two. Len Goodman, Craig Revel Horwood, and Bruno Tonioli returned as judges. Series 5 winner Alesha Dixon joined the judging panel as a replacement for Arlene Phillips. Darcey Bussell, who later became a permanent judge from 2012 to 2018, served as a guest judge beginning with the quarterfinal.

Camilla Dallerup, Karen Hardy, and Hayley Holt were replaced as professional female dancers by Natalie Lowe, Aliona Vilani, and Katya Virshilas. The show on 7 November was filmed from the Blackpool Tower Ballroom for the first time since the finale of series 2.

Due to illness, Bruce Forsyth did not appear on the show on 14 November. Tess Daly served as main presenter for the episode alongside the "surprise" addition of Ronnie Corbett, while Claudia Winkleman took over Daly's normal role. Daly and Winkleman both later held these positions permanently from 2014 to 2025.

BBC Breakfast sports presenter Chris Hollins and Ola Jordan were announced as the winners on 19 December, while Hollyoaks actor Ricky Whittle and Natalie Lowe finished in second place.

== Format ==
Hosts and Judges for Strictly Come Dancing (Series 7)

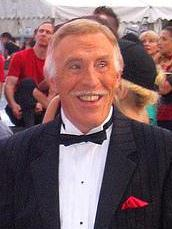
Bruce Forsyth

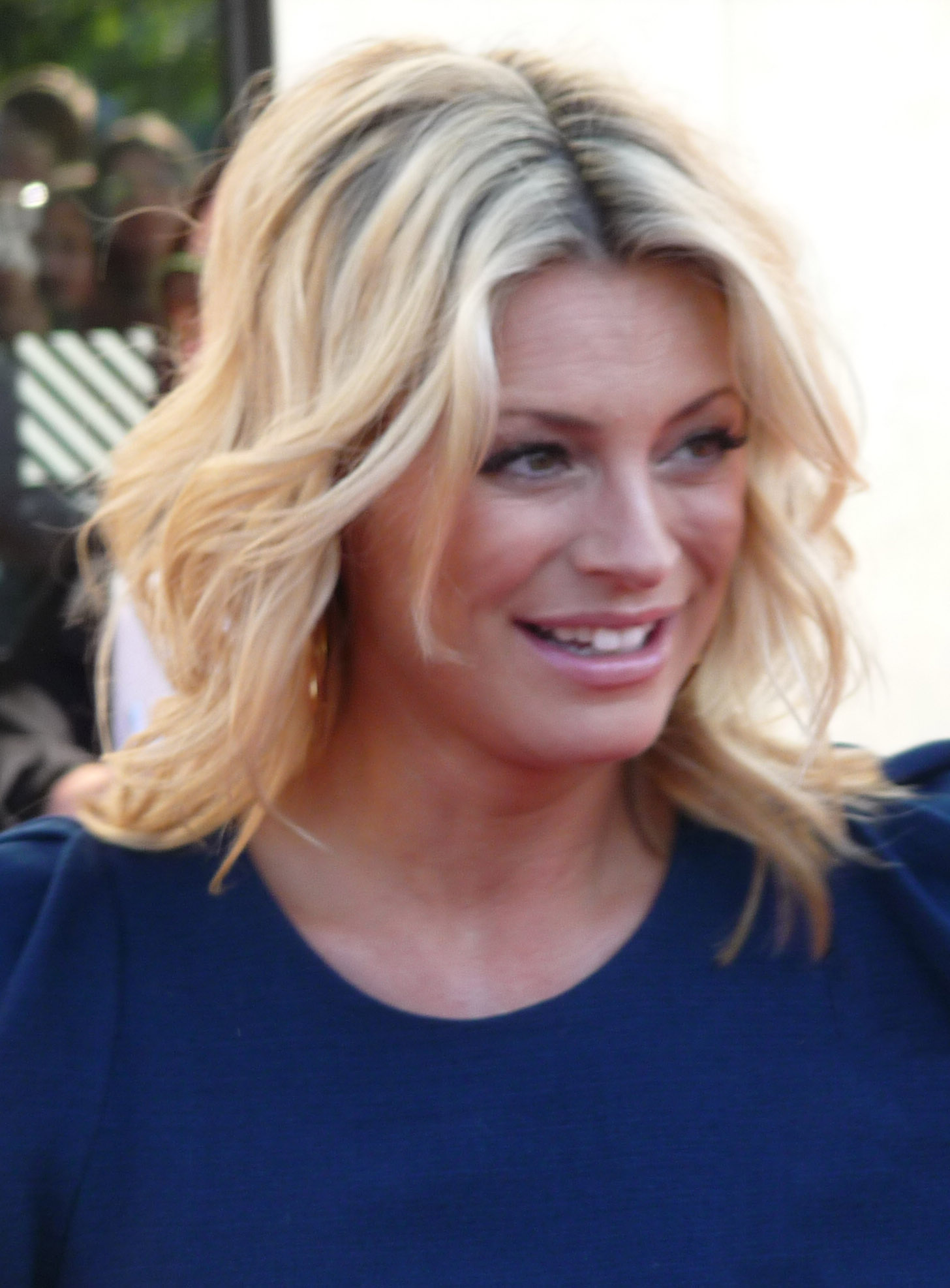
Tess Daly

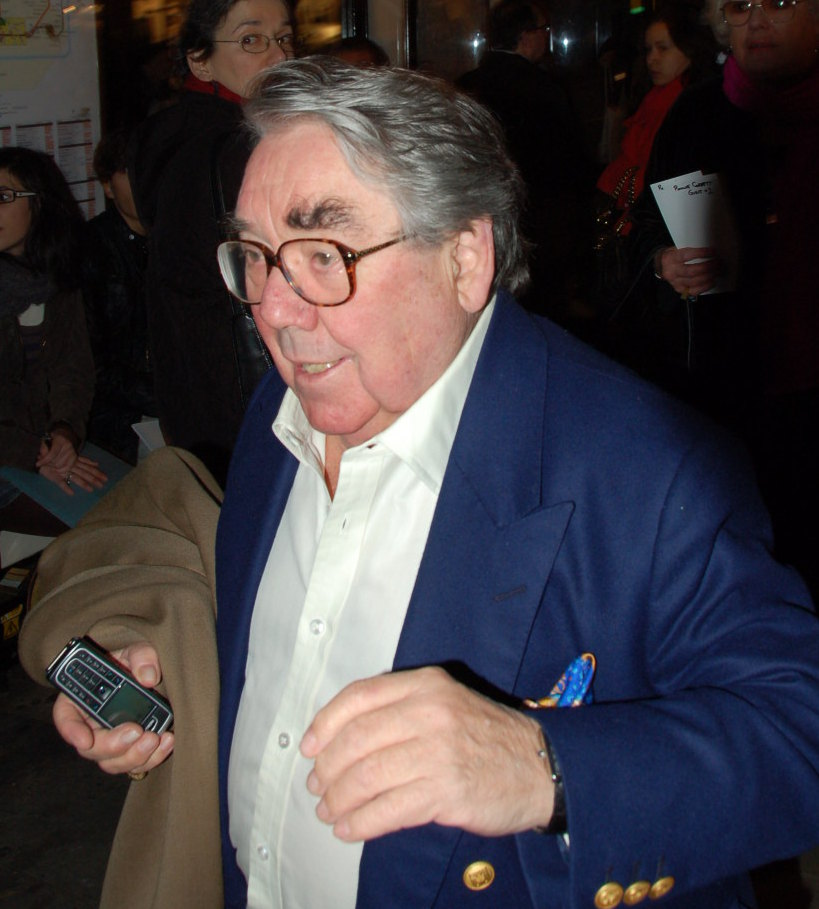
Ronnie Corbett (guest)

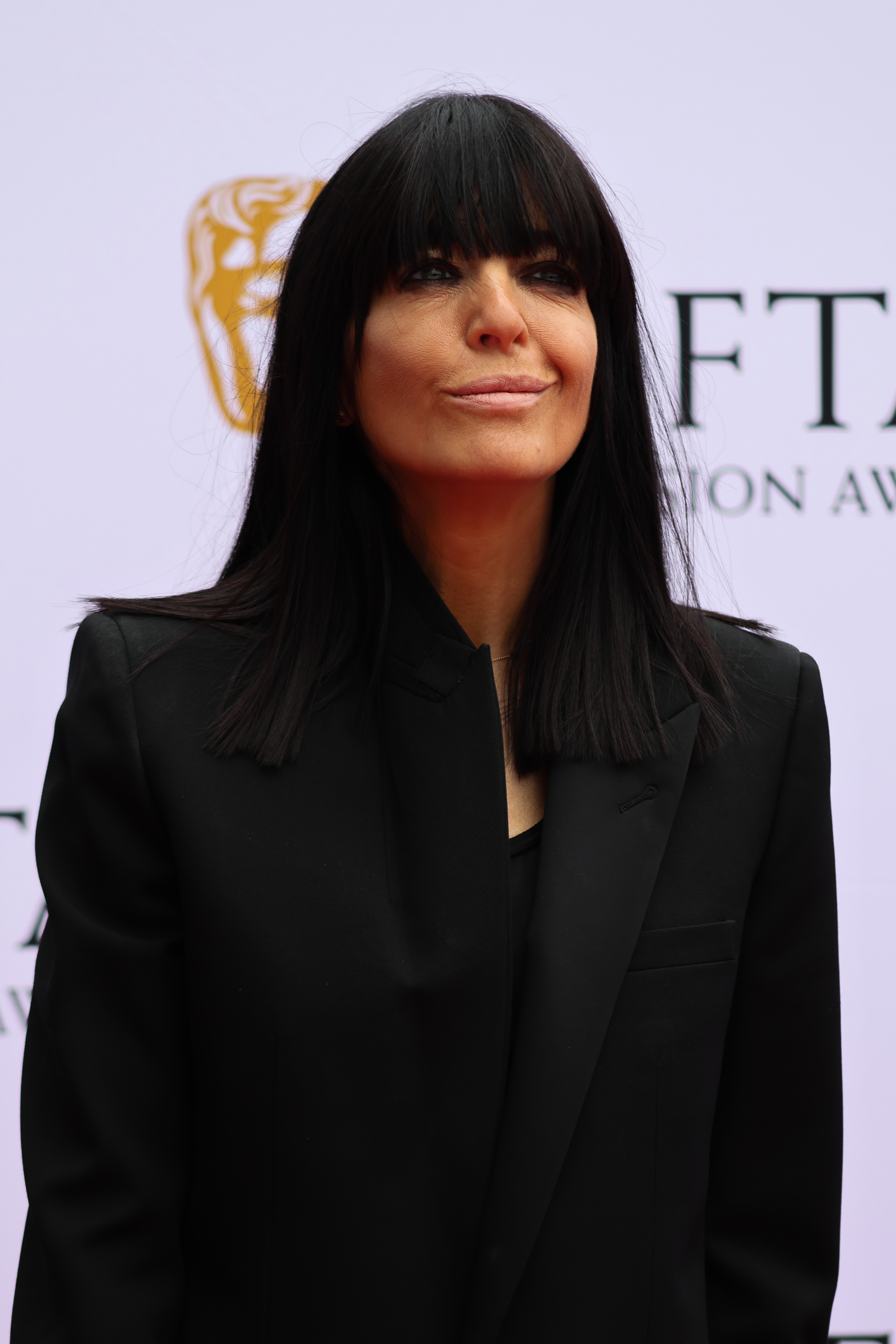
Claudia Winkleman (guest)

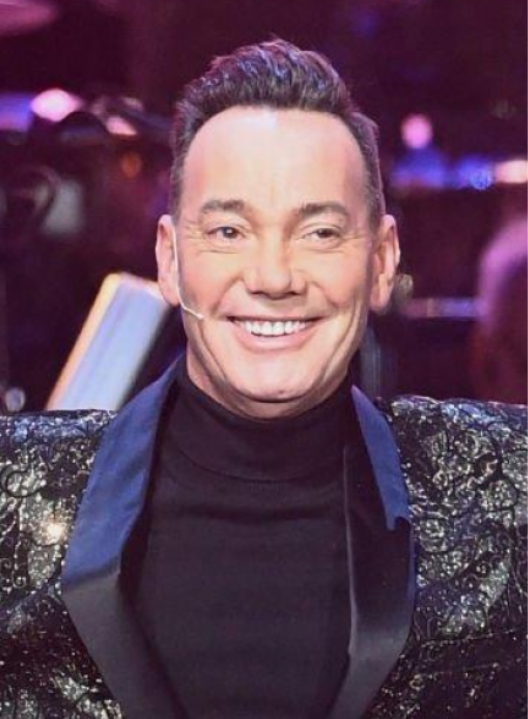
Craig Revel Horwood

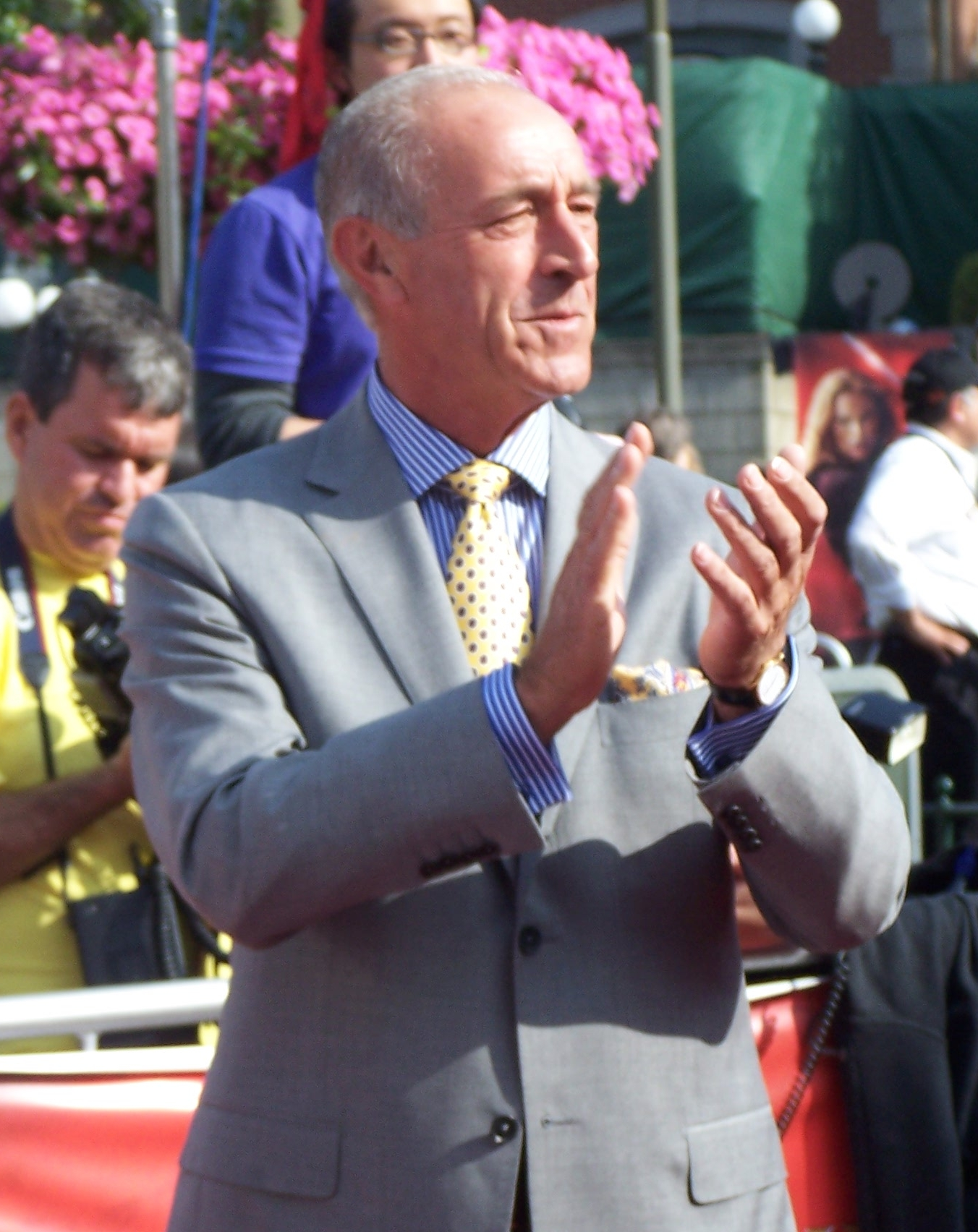
Len Goodman

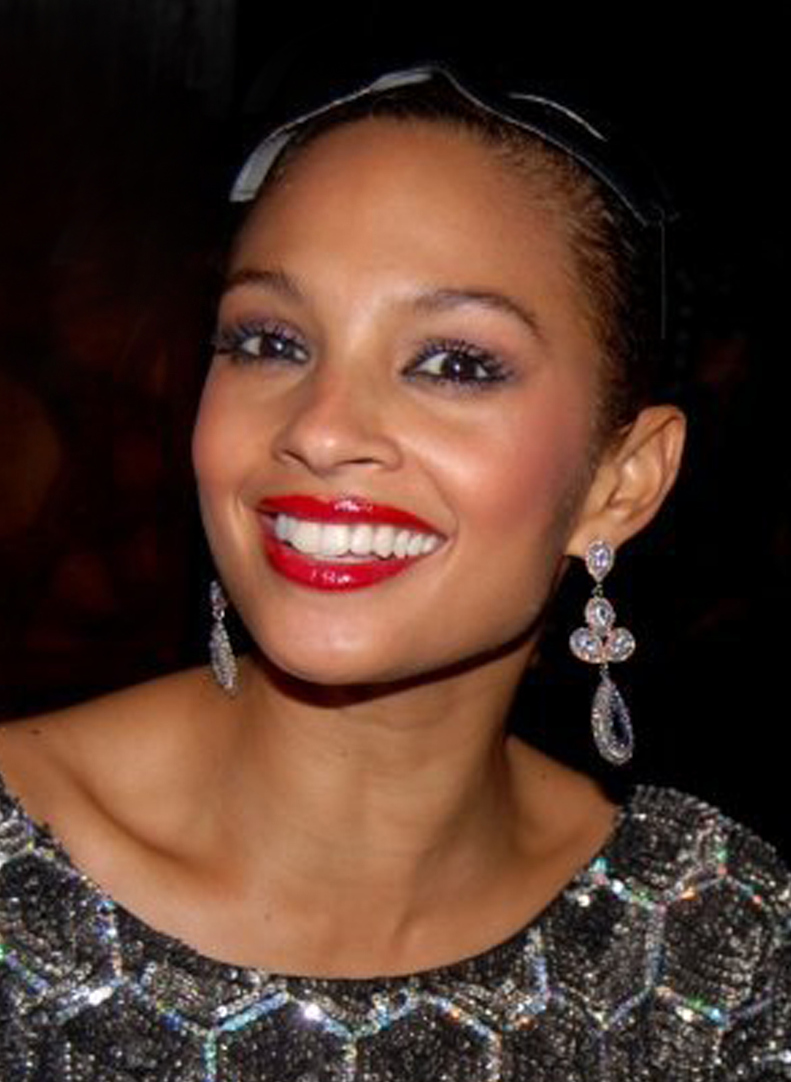
Alesha Dixon

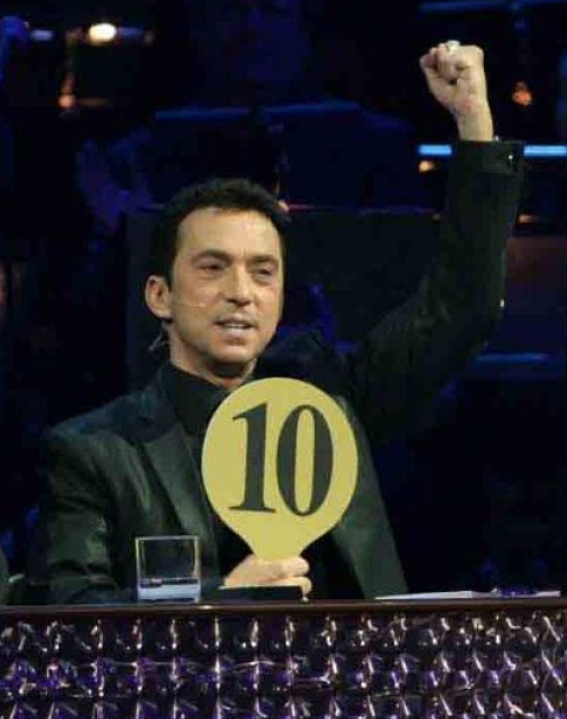
Bruno Tonioli

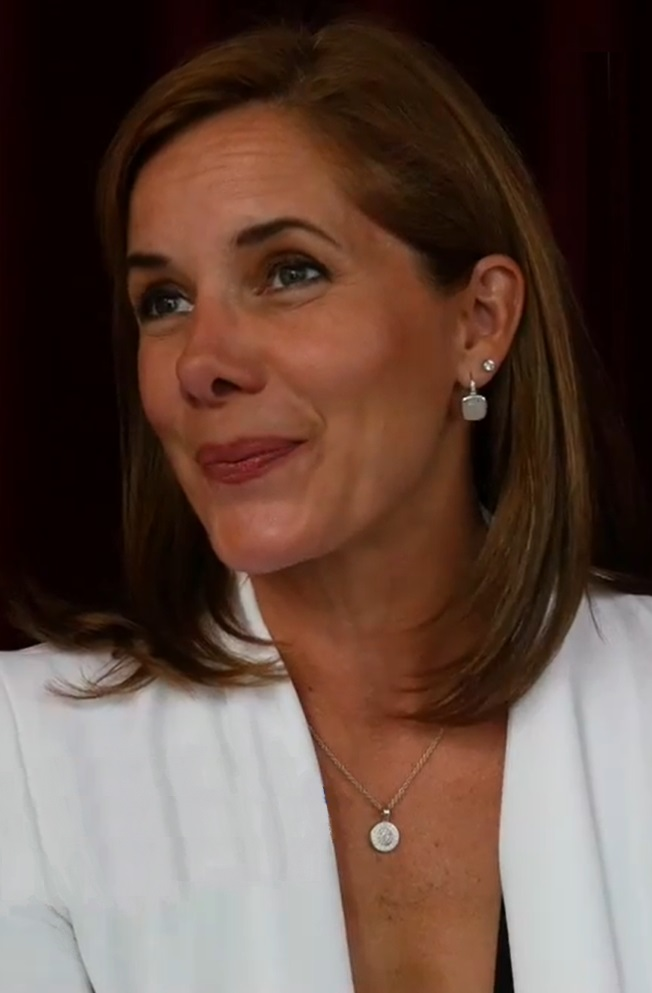
Darcey Bussell (guest)

The couples dance each week in a live show. The judges score each performance out of ten. The couples are then ranked according to the judges' scores and given points according to their rank, with the lowest scored couple receiving one point, and the highest scored couple receiving the most points (the maximum number of points available depends on the number of couples remaining in the competition). The public are also invited to vote for their favourite couples, and the couples are ranked again according to the number of votes they receive, again receiving points; the couple with the fewest votes receiving one point, and the couple with the most votes receiving the most points.

The points for judges' score and public vote are then added together, and the two couples with the fewest points are placed in the bottom two. If two couples have equal points, the points from the public vote are given precedence. As with the previous series, the bottom two couples have to perform a dance-off on the results show. Based on that performance alone, each judge then votes on which couple should stay and which couple should leave, with Len Goodman, as head judge, having the last and deciding vote.

== Couples ==
This series featured sixteen celebrity contestants.

Celebrity	Notability	Professional partner	Status
Martina Hingis	Professional tennis player	Matthew Cutler	Eliminated 1st on 19 September 2009
Richard Dunwoody	Jockey	Lilia Kopylova	Eliminated 2nd on 26 September 2009
Rav Wilding	Crimewatch presenter	Aliona Vilani	Eliminated 3rd on 3 October 2009
Lynda Bellingham	Actress & Loose Women panellist	Darren Bennett	Eliminated 4th on 10 October 2009
Joe Calzaghe	Professional boxer	Kristina Rihanoff	Eliminated 5th on 17 October 2009
Jo Wood	Model & entrepreneur	Brendan Cole	Eliminated 6th on 24 October 2009
Zöe Lucker	Footballers' Wives actress	James Jordan	Eliminated 7th on 31 October 2009
Craig Kelly	Coronation Street actor	Flavia Cacace	Eliminated 8th on 7 November 2009
Phil Tufnell	England cricketer	Katya Virshilas	Eliminated 9th on 14 November 2009
Jade Johnson	Olympic long jumper	Ian Waite	Withdrew on 21 November 2009
Ricky Groves	EastEnders actor	Erin Boag	Eliminated 10th on 21 November 2009
Natalie Cassidy	EastEnders actress	Vincent Simone	Eliminated 11th on 28 November 2009
Laila Rouass	Footballers' Wives actress	Anton Du Beke	Eliminated 12th on 5 December 2009
Ali Bastian	The Bill & Hollyoaks actress	Brian Fortuna	Eliminated 13th on 12 December 2009
Ricky Whittle	Hollyoaks actor	Natalie Lowe	Runners-up on 19 December 2009
Chris Hollins	BBC Breakfast sports presenter	Ola Jordan	Winners on 19 December 2009

== Scoring chart ==
The highest score each week is indicated in bold green with a dagger (†), while the lowest score each week is indicated in italicized red with a double-dagger (‡).

Color key:

Winners
Runners-up
Bottom two
Excused from competition for the week
Withdrew from competition
Eliminated

Strictly Come Dancing (series 7) - Weekly scores
Couple	Pl.	Week													
Couple	Pl.	1	2	3	4	5	6	7	8	9	10	11	12 (Note: The couples were scored on a 50-point scale due to the presence of a guest judge.)	13	14
Chris & Ola	1st	26+30=56	—N/a	23	25	22	28	29	34	30	29	34+7=41	41+39=80	38+42=80‡	46+44+50+46=186‡ (Note: This couple finished in first place.)
Ricky W. & Natalie	2nd	—N/a	33+32=**65**†	**35**†	32	**36**†	32	**39**†	35	**35**†	**36**†	31+9=40 (Note: This couple was in the bottom two, but was not eliminated.)	48+47=**95**†	47+49=**96**†	50+43+48+49=**190**† (Note: This couple finished in second place.)
Ali & Brian	3rd	30+30=**60**†	—N/a	32	32	29	**37**†	33	**40**†	**35**†	35	37+10=**47**†	42+44=86	42+50=92 (Note: This couple was eliminated.)	
Laila & Anton	4th	—N/a	30+25=55	30	**34**†	22	28	33	30	22‡	29	31+8=39	33+26=59‡		
Natalie & Vincent	5th	—N/a	24+26=50	28	29	27	29	30	31	34	26	26+7=33‡			
Ricky G. & Erin	6th	21+26=47	—N/a	29	28	25	29	24‡	25	29	22‡				
Jade & Ian	7th	25+27=52	—N/a	31	29	35	32	35	33	(Note: This couple was excused from competition due to illness or injury, and was granted a bye to the following week.)	(Note: This couple withdrew from the competition.)				
Phil & Katya	8th	—N/a	29+22=51	24	24	27	25	30	28	31					
Craig & Flavia	9th	—N/a	22+22=44	21	24	20‡	18	24‡	17‡						
Zöe & James	10th	—N/a	30+31=61	31	33	30	33	32							
Jo & Brendan	11th	—N/a	18+18=36‡	20	20‡	23	14‡								
Joe & Kristina	12th	16+16=32‡	—N/a	19‡	20‡	21									
Lynda & Darren	13th	21+23=44	—N/a	25	24										
Rav & Aliona	14th	19+22=41	—N/a	20											
Richard & Lilia	15th	—N/a	19+19=38												
Martina & Matthew	16th	22+24=46													

=== Average chart ===
This table only counts for dances scored on a traditional 40-point scale. Darcey Bussell's scores from Weeks 12-14 have been removed accordingly.

Couple	Rank by average	Total points	Number of dances	Total average
Ricky W. & Natalie	1st	682	19	35.9
Ali & Brian	2nd	512	15	34.1
Zoë & James	3rd	220	7	31.4
Chris & Ola	4th	588	19	30.9
Jade & Ian	4th	247	8	30.9
Natalie & Vincent	6th	310	11	28.1
Laila & Anton	7th	362	13	27.8
Phil & Katya	8th	240	9	26.7
Ricky G. & Erin	9th	258	10	25.8
Lynda & Darren	10th	93	4	23.3
Martina & Matthew	11th	46	2	23.0
Craig & Flavia	12th	168	8	21.0
Rav & Aliona	13th	61	3	20.3
Richard & Lilia	14th	38	2	19.0
Jo & Brendan	15th	113	6	18.8
Joe & Kristina	16th	92	5	18.4

== Weekly scores ==
Unless indicated otherwise, individual judges scores in the charts below (given in parentheses) are listed in this order from left to right: Craig Revel Horwood, Len Goodman, Alesha Dixon, Bruno Tonioli.

=== Week 1 ===
Musical guest: Katherine Jenkins — "I Believe"

Only half of the couples performed this week, and they performed once each on two different nights. On the first night, they performed either the tango or the waltz; and on the second night, they performed either the cha-cha-cha or the rumba. The couples who did not compete this week performed a group merengue that was not scored. One couple was eliminated after the second night. Couples are listed in the order they performed.

Night 1

Couple	Scores	Dance	Music
Rav & Aliona	19 (3, 6, 5, 5)	Tango	"Baby Did a Bad, Bad Thing" — Chris Isaak
Ricky G. & Erin	21 (4, 6, 6, 5)	Waltz	"What'll I Do" — Irving Berlin
Chris & Ola	26 (6, 7, 7, 6)	Tango	"Sharp Dressed Man" — ZZ Top
Jade & Ian	25 (6, 7, 6, 6)	Waltz	"Weekend in New England" — Barry Manilow
Martina & Matthew	22 (4, 6, 6, 6)	Waltz	"Jesse" — Roberta Flack
Lynda & Darren	21 (3, 6, 7, 5)	Tango	"Under Pressure" — Queen & David Bowie
Ali & Brian	30 (7, 8, 8, 7)	Waltz	"Reach Out and Touch (Somebody's Hand)" — Diana Ross
Joe & Kristina	16 (2, 5, 5, 4)	Tango	"Cité Tango" — Astor Piazzolla

Night 2

Couple	Scores	Dance	Music	Result
Jade & Ian	27 (6, 7, 7, 7)	Cha-cha-cha	"Ain't No Other Man" — Christina Aguilera	Safe
Ali & Brian	30 (7, 7, 8, 8)	Rumba	"That's What Friends Are For" — Dionne Warwick	Safe
Lynda & Darren	23 (5, 6, 6, 6)	Cha-cha-cha	"Don't Go Breaking My Heart" — Elton John & Kiki Dee	Safe
Rav & Aliona	22 (4, 6, 5, 7)	Rumba	"Temptation" — Tom Waits	Bottom two
Chris & Ola	30 (7, 8, 7, 8)	Rumba	"Don't Know Much" — Linda Ronstadt	Safe
Joe & Kristina	16 (2, 5, 5, 4)	Cha-cha-cha	"Chain of Fools" — Aretha Franklin	Safe
Martina & Matthew	24 (5, 6, 7, 6)	Rumba	"Alone" — Heart	Eliminated
Ricky G. & Erin	26 (6, 7, 7, 6)	Cha-cha-cha	"Jump (for My Love)" — The Pointer Sisters	Safe

Judges' votes to save

- Horwood: Martina & Matthew
- Dixon: Martina & Matthew
- Tonioli: Rav & Aliona
- Goodman: Rav & Aliona (Since the other judges were not unanimous, Len Goodman, as head judge, made the final decision to save Rav & Aliona.)

=== Week 2 ===
Musical guest: Jamie Cullum — "I'm All Over It"

The format this week was the same as last week. The half of the couples who did not perform last week performed once each on two different nights. They performed either the tango or the waltz on the first night, and either the cha-cha-cha or the rumba on the second night. The couples who did not compete this week performed a group merengue that was not scored. One couple was eliminated after the second night. Couples are listed in the order they performed.

Night 1

Couple	Scores	Dance	Music
Natalie & Vincent	24 (6, 6, 6, 6)	Tango	"Spider of the Night" — Pedro Manilla
Zöe & James	30 (7, 8, 7, 8)	Waltz	"Some Day My Prince Will Come" — Adriana Caselotti
Craig & Flavia	22 (5, 6, 5, 6)	Tango	"Jai Ho" — Pussycat Dolls
Richard & Lilia	19 (4, 5, 5, 5)	Waltz	"Truly" — Lionel Richie
Laila & Anton	30 (7, 8, 7, 8)	Tango	"El Choclo" — Ángel Villoldo
Phil & Katya	29 (7, 8, 7, 7)	Waltz	"Sam" — Olivia Newton-John
Jo & Brendan	18 (3, 5, 5, 5)	Tango	"Let's Dance" — David Bowie
Ricky W. & Natalie	33 (8, 9, 8, 8)	Waltz	"It Is You (I Have Loved)" — Dana Glover

Night 2

Couple	Scores	Dance	Music	Result
Phil & Katya	22 (4, 6, 6, 6)	Cha-cha-cha	"Daddy" — Della Reese	Safe
Craig & Flavia	22 (5, 6, 5, 6)	Rumba	"Will You Still Love Me Tomorrow?" — Amy Winehouse	Bottom two
Laila & Anton	25 (6, 7, 6, 6)	Cha-cha-cha	"Sway" — Rosemary Clooney	Safe
Zöe & James	31 (8, 7, 8, 8)	Rumba	"Out of Reach" — Gabrielle	Safe
Jo & Brendan	18 (3, 5, 5, 5)	Rumba	"Fallen" — Lauren Wood	Safe
Richard & Lilia	19 (4, 5, 5, 5)	Cha-cha-cha	"I'm Your Man" — Wham!	Eliminated
Ricky W. & Natalie	32 (8, 8, 8, 8)	Rumba	"Stepping Stone" — Duffy	Safe
Natalie & Vincent	26 (6, 7, 7, 6)	Cha-cha-cha	"Bang Bang" — David Sanborn	Safe

Judges' votes to save

- Horwood: Craig & Flavia
- Dixon: Craig & Flavia
- Tonioli: Craig & Flavia
- Goodman: Did not vote, but would have voted to save Richard & Lilia

=== Week 3 ===
Musical guest: Andy Williams — "Moon River"

Couples performed either the paso doble or the quickstep, and are listed in the order they performed.

Couple	Scores	Dance	Music	Result
Ali & Brian	32 (8, 8, 8, 8)	Quickstep	"I Get a Kick Out of You" — Frank Sinatra	Safe
Lynda & Darren	25 (5, 7, 7, 6)	Paso doble	"Devil Woman" — Cliff Richard	Bottom two
Chris & Ola	23 (5, 6, 6, 6)	Quickstep	"Dancin' Fool" — Barry Manilow	Safe
Zöe & James	31 (7, 8, 8, 8)	Paso doble	"You've Got the Love" — Florence and the Machine	Safe
Rav & Aliona	20 (3, 6, 5, 6)	Quickstep	"We Go Together" — John Travolta & Olivia Newton-John	Eliminated
Natalie & Vincent	28 (6, 7, 8, 7)	Paso doble	"Malagueña" — Connie Francis	Safe
Craig & Flavia	21 (4, 6, 6, 5)	Quickstep	"Peroxide Swing" — Michael Bublé	Safe
Ricky W. & Natalie	35 (8, 9, 9, 9)	Paso doble	"Spanish Gypsy Dance" — Pascual Marquina Narro	Safe
Jade & Ian	31 (7, 8, 8, 8)	Quickstep	"Fascination" — Alphabeat	Safe
Joe & Kristina	19 (3, 5, 6, 5)	Paso doble	"Livin' on a Prayer" — Bon Jovi	Safe
Laila & Anton	30 (8, 8, 7, 7)	Quickstep	"Strike Up the Band" — Tony Bennett	Safe
Jo & Brendan	20 (3, 6, 6, 5)	Paso doble	"Because the Night" — Patti Smith	Safe
Phil & Katya	24 (5, 6, 6, 7)	Quickstep	"Put on a Happy Face" — Tony Bennett	Safe
Ricky G. & Erin	29 (7, 7, 8, 7)	Paso doble	"One Vision" — Queen	Safe

Judges' votes to save

- Horwood: Lynda & Darren
- Dixon: Lynda & Darren
- Tonioli: Lynda & Darren
- Goodman: Did not vote, but would have voted to save Lynda & Darren

=== Week 4 ===
Musical guest: Dionne Bromfield — "Mama Said" (with Amy Winehouse providing backing vocals)

Couples performed either the foxtrot or the salsa, and are listed in the order they performed.

Couple	Scores	Dance	Music	Result
Zöe & James	33 (8, 9, 8, 8)	Foxtrot	"This Will Be (An Everlasting Love)" — Natalie Cole	Safe
Chris & Ola	25 (5, 6, 7, 7)	Salsa	"Micaela" — King Bongo	Safe
Lynda & Darren	24 (5, 7, 6, 6)	Foxtrot	"Calendar Girl" — Neil Sedaka	Eliminated
Ali & Brian	32 (8, 8, 8, 8)	Salsa	"Quimbara" — Celia Cruz	Safe
Jo & Brendan	20 (4, 6, 5, 5)	Foxtrot	"Crazy" — Patsy Cline	Safe
Natalie & Vincent	29 (7, 8, 7, 7)	Salsa	"You'll Be Mine (Party Time)" — Gloria Estefan	Safe
Joe & Kristina	20 (3, 6, 6, 5)	Foxtrot	"Feeling Good" — Michael Bublé	Safe
Laila & Anton	34 (8, 9, 9, 8)	Foxtrot	"Just in Time" — Frank Sinatra	Safe
Ricky W. & Natalie	32 (8, 8, 8, 8)	Salsa	"Dancing Machine" — The Jackson Five	Safe
Craig & Flavia	24 (5, 7, 6, 6)	Foxtrot	"Sometimes When We Touch" — Dan Hill	Bottom two
Jade & Ian	29 (7, 7, 8, 7)	Salsa	"La Isla Bonita" — Anna Book	Safe
Ricky G. & Erin	28 (6, 8, 7, 7)	Foxtrot	"All of Me" — Frank Sinatra	Safe
Phil & Katya	24 (4, 7, 6, 7)	Salsa	"Long Train Runnin'" — Doobie Brothers	Safe

Judges' votes to save

- Horwood: Lynda & Darren
- Dixon: Lynda & Darren
- Tonioli: Craig & Flavia
- Goodman: Craig & Flavia (Since the other judges were not unanimous, Len Goodman, as head judge, made the final decision to save Craig & Flavia.)

=== Week 5 ===
Musical guest: Spandau Ballet — "Gold"

Couples performed either the jive or the Viennese waltz, and are listed in the order they performed.

Couple	Scores	Dance	Music	Result
Ricky G. & Erin	25 (6, 7, 7, 5)	Jive	"The Boy from New York City" — The Manhattan Transfer	Safe
Jade & Ian	35 (8, 9, 9, 9)	Viennese waltz	"It's a Man's Man's Man's World" — James Brown	Safe
Ali & Brian	29 (6, 7, 8, 8)	Jive	"Tutti Frutti" — Little Richard	Safe
Jo & Brendan	23 (5, 7, 6, 5)	Viennese waltz	"Trouble" — Ray LaMontagne	Safe
Zöe & James	30 (7, 8, 8, 7)	Jive	"Tainted Love" — Gloria Jones	Bottom two
Ricky W. & Natalie	36 (8, 9, 10, 9)	Viennese waltz	"How Can I Be Sure" — David Cassidy	Safe
Craig & Flavia	20 (4, 6, 5, 5)	Jive	"It Takes Two" — Marvin Gaye	Safe
Joe & Kristina	21 (4, 6, 6, 5)	Jive	"Rock This Town" — Stray Cats	Eliminated
Natalie & Vincent	27 (7, 7, 7, 6)	Viennese waltz	"At Last" — Etta James	Safe
Laila & Anton	22 (5, 7, 5, 5)	Jive	"Modern Love" — David Bowie	Safe
Phil & Katya	27 (6, 7, 7, 7)	Viennese waltz	"Mad About the Boy" — Dinah Washington	Safe
Chris & Ola	22 (5, 6, 6, 5)	Jive	"Roll Over Beethoven" — Chuck Berry	Safe

Judges' votes to save

- Horwood: Zöe & James
- Dixon: Zöe & James
- Tonioli: Zöe & James
- Goodman: Did not vote, but would have voted to save Zöe & James

=== Week 6 ===
Musical guest: Harry Connick, Jr. — "The Way You Look Tonight"

Couples performed either the American Smooth or the samba, and are listed in the order they performed.

Couple	Scores	Dance	Music	Result
Jade & Ian	32 (8, 8, 8, 8)	Samba	"Independent Women" — Destiny's Child	Bottom two
Chris & Ola	28 (7, 7, 7, 7)	American Smooth	"Jimmy Mack" — Martha Reeves and the Vandellas	Safe
Phil & Katya	25 (6, 7, 6, 6)	Samba	"Daddy Cool" — Boney M.	Safe
Zöe & James	33 (8, 8, 9, 8)	American Smooth	"My Girl" — The Temptations	Safe
Craig & Flavia	18 (3, 6, 4, 5)	Samba	"Give It Up" — KC & The Sunshine Band	Safe
Ricky G. & Erin	29 (7, 8, 7, 7)	American Smooth	"Chim Chim Cher-ee" — Cliff Richard	Safe
Ricky W. & Natalie	32 (8, 8, 8, 8)	Samba	"Good Lovin'" — The Young Rascals	Safe
Natalie & Vincent	29 (7, 8, 7, 7)	American Smooth	"Please Don't Talk About Me When I'm Gone" — Dean Martin	Safe
Jo & Brendan	14 (2, 5, 3, 4)	Samba	"Superstition" — Stevie Wonder	Eliminated
Ali & Brian	37 (9, 9, 9, 10)	American Smooth	"A Foggy Day in London Town" — Michael Bublé	Safe
Laila & Anton	28 (7, 7, 7, 7)	Samba	"He's the Greatest Dancer" — Sister Sledge	Safe

Judges' votes to save

- Horwood: Jade & Ian
- Dixon: Jade & Ian
- Tonioli: Jade & Ian
- Goodman: Did not vote, but would have voted to save Jade & Ian

=== Week 7 ===
Musical guest: Bee Gees — "You Should Be Dancing"

Couples are listed in the order they performed.

Couple	Scores	Dance	Music	Result
Natalie & Vincent	30 (7, 8, 7, 8)	Jive	"Good Golly Miss Molly" — Little Richard	Safe
Ali & Brian	33 (8, 9, 8, 8)	Paso doble	"El Gato Montes" — Ramon Cortez Pasodoble Orchestra	Bottom two
Craig & Flavia	24 (5, 7, 7, 5)	Waltz	"Don't Let the Sun Go Down on Me" — Elton John	Safe
Chris & Ola	29 (7, 8, 7, 7)	Cha-cha-cha	"Shake Your Groove Thing" — Peaches & Herb	Safe
Jade & Ian	35 (8, 9, 9, 9)	Foxtrot	"A Recipe for Making Love" — Harry Connick, Jr.	Safe
Zöe & James	32 (7, 8, 9, 8)	Samba	"Boogie Nights" — Heatwave	Eliminated
Ricky G. & Erin	24 (4, 8, 7, 5)	Rumba	"Licence To Kill" — Gladys Knight	Safe
Laila & Anton	33 (8, 9, 8, 8)	Viennese waltz	"Once Around the Block" — Badly Drawn Boy	Safe
Phil & Katya	30 (7, 7, 8, 8)	Tango	"Back to Black" — Amy Winehouse	Safe
Ricky W. & Natalie	39 (9, 10, 10, 10)	Quickstep	"Down With Love" — Holly Palmer & Michael Bublé	Safe

Judges' votes to save

- Horwood: Ali & Brian
- Dixon: Zöe & James
- Tonioli: Ali & Brian
- Goodman: Ali & Brian

=== Week 8: Blackpool Week ===
Musical guest: Rod Stewart — "It's the Same Old Song"

This week's episode was staged in the Tower Ballroom at the Blackpool Tower in Blackpool, Lancashire. Couples are listed in the order they performed.

Couple	Scores	Dance	Music	Result
Ricky W. & Natalie	35 (8, 9, 9, 9)	Tango	"You Really Got Me" — The Kinks	Safe
Natalie & Vincent	31 (7, 8, 8, 8)	Quickstep	"Tu Vuò Fà L'Americano" — Fiorello	Safe
Jade & Ian	33 (8, 8, 9, 8)	Jive	"Flip, Flop, Fly" — The Blues Brothers	Safe
Ali & Brian	40 (10, 10, 10, 10)	Viennese waltz	"Do Right Woman, Do Right Man" — Etta James	Safe
Ricky G. & Erin	25 (6, 7, 6, 6)	Salsa	"Acuyuye" — D.L.G	Bottom two
Laila & Anton	30 (7, 7, 8, 8)	Paso doble	"Layla" — Derek and the Dominos	Safe
Phil & Katya	28 (6, 8, 7, 7)	Rumba	"Maybe I'm Amazed" — Paul McCartney	Safe
Chris & Ola	34 (8, 9, 9, 8)	Foxtrot	"I Could Have Danced All Night" — Frank Sinatra	Safe
Craig & Flavia	17 (3, 5, 4, 5)	Cha-cha-cha	"Easy Lover" — Phil Collins	Eliminated

Judges' votes to save

- Horwood: Ricky G. & Erin
- Dixon: Ricky G. & Erin
- Tonioli: Ricky G. & Erin
- Goodman: Did not vote, but would have voted to save Ricky G. & Erin

=== Week 9 ===
Musical guest: Cast of Jersey Boys — "Beggin'"

Bruce Forsyth did not attend the live show due to influenza; Ronnie Corbett stepped in as guest host.

Laila Rouass only performed half of her rumba due to a backstage injury. The judges scored the dance only on what they saw. Jade Johnson also suffered a knee injury during dress rehearsal and was unable to perform on the live show. Under the rules of the show, she was granted a bye to the following week.

Couples are listed in the order they performed.

Couple	Scores	Dance	Music	Result
Phil & Katya	31 (7, 8, 8, 8)	American Smooth	"Come Fly with Me" — Frank Sinatra	Eliminated
Ricky W. & Natalie	35 (8, 9, 9, 9)	Jive	"Rip It Up" — Little Richard	Safe
Ricky G. & Erin	29 (7, 8, 7, 7)	Viennese waltz	"Nights in White Satin" — The Moody Blues	Bottom two
Chris & Ola	30 (6, 8, 9, 7)	Paso doble	"I Believe in a Thing Called Love" — The Darkness	Safe
Laila & Anton	22 (3, 7, 6, 6)	Rumba	"Rule the World" — Take That	Safe
Natalie & Vincent	34 (8, 9, 9, 8)	Foxtrot	"Magic Moments" — Perry Como	Safe
Ali & Brian	35 (9, 8, 9, 9)	Cha-cha-cha	"I Gotta Feeling" — The Black Eyed Peas	Safe

Judges' votes to save

- Horwood: Ricky G. & Erin
- Dixon: Phil & Katya
- Tonioli: Phil & Katya
- Goodman: Ricky G. & Erin (Since the other judges were not unanimous, Len Goodman, as head judge, made the final decision to save Ricky G. & Erin.)

=== Week 10 ===
Musical guest: Dame Shirley Bassey — "This Time"

Jade Johnson withdrew from the competition earlier in the week due to her prior injury.

Couples are listed in the order they performed.

Couple	Scores	Dance	Music	Result
Ali & Brian	35 (8, 9, 9, 9)	Foxtrot	"Haven't Met You Yet" — Michael Bublé	Safe
Natalie & Vincent	26 (6, 7, 8, 5)	Samba	"Holiday" — Madonna	Safe
Chris & Ola	29 (7, 8, 7, 7)	Viennese waltz	"A New Day Has Come" — Celine Dion	Safe
Ricky W. & Natalie	36 (9, 8, 10, 9)	American Smooth	"Over the Rainbow" — Eva Cassidy	Safe
Laila & Anton	29 (6, 8, 7, 8)	Waltz	"Fascination" — Nat King Cole	Bottom two
Ricky G. & Erin	22 (5, 6, 6, 5)	Tango	"U Got the Look" — Prince	Eliminated

Judges' votes to save

- Horwood: Laila & Anton
- Dixon: Laila & Anton
- Tonioli: Laila & Anton
- Goodman: Did not vote, but would have voted to save Laila & Anton

=== Week 11 ===
Musical guests: James Morrison & Nelly Furtado — "Broken Strings"

Each couple performed either the Charleston or rock 'n' roll, and then all couples participated in a group Viennese waltz for individual points. Couples are listed in the order they performed.

Couple	Scores	Dance	Music	Result
Chris & Ola	34 (8, 8, 9, 9)	Charleston	"Fat Sam's Grand Slam" — Bugsy Malone	Safe
Ricky W. & Natalie	31 (7, 8, 8, 8)	Rock 'n' roll	"Hound Dog" — Elvis Presley	Bottom two
Ali & Brian	37 (9, 9, 10, 9)	Charleston	"Pencil Full of Lead" — Paolo Nutini	Safe
Natalie & Vincent	26 (5, 7, 7, 7)	Rock 'n' roll	"Long Tall Sally" — Little Richard	Eliminated
Laila & Anton	31 (6, 9, 8, 8)	Charleston	"Yes Sir, That's My Baby" — Firehouse Five Plus Two	Safe
Ali & Brian	10	Group; Viennese waltz	"Piano Man" — Billy Joel	
Chris & Ola	7	Group; Viennese waltz	"Piano Man" — Billy Joel	
Laila & Anton	8	Group; Viennese waltz	"Piano Man" — Billy Joel	
Natalie & Vincent	7	Group; Viennese waltz	"Piano Man" — Billy Joel	
Ricky W. & Natalie	9	Group; Viennese waltz	"Piano Man" — Billy Joel	

Judges' votes to save

- Horwood: Ricky W. & Natalie
- Dixon: Ricky W. & Natalie
- Tonioli: Ricky W. & Natalie
- Goodman: Did not vote, but would have voted to save Ricky W. & Natalie

=== Week 12: Quarter-final ===
Individual judges' scores in the chart below (given in parentheses) are listed in this order from left to right: Craig Revel Horwood, Darcey Bussell, Len Goodman, Alesha Dixon, Bruno Tonioli.

Musical guest: Bette Midler — "The Rose"

Each couple performed two routines, and are listed in the order they performed.

Couple	Scores	Dance	Music	Result
Ali & Brian	42 (8, 9, 8, 9, 8)	Tango	"Born to Be Wild" — Steppenwolf	Safe
Ali & Brian	44 (9, 9, 8, 9, 9)	Samba	"Change" — Daniel Merriweather	Safe
Laila & Anton	33 (6, 6, 7, 7, 7)	American Smooth	"My Kind of Girl" — Matt Monro	Eliminated
Laila & Anton	26 (5, 5, 6, 5, 5)	Salsa	"Cogele el Gusto" — Wayne Gorbea	Eliminated
Chris & Ola	41 (8, 8, 8, 9, 8)	Waltz	"At This Moment" — Billy Vera and the Beaters	Safe
Chris & Ola	39 (8, 8, 8, 8, 7)	Samba	"Cuba" — Gibson Brothers	Safe
Ricky W. & Natalie	48 (9, 9, 10, 10, 10)	Foxtrot	"Too Marvelous for Words" — Frank Sinatra	Bottom two
Ricky W. & Natalie	47 (9, 10, 9, 10, 9)	Cha-cha-cha	"Sunshine of Your Love" — Spanky Wilson	Bottom two

Judges' votes to save

- Horwood: Ricky W. & Natalie
- Bussell: Ricky W. & Natalie
- Dixon: Ricky W. & Natalie
- Tonioli: Did not vote, but would have voted to save Ricky W. & Natalie
- Goodman: Did not vote, but would have voted to save Ricky W. & Natalie

=== Week 13: Semi-final ===
Individual judges' scores in the chart below (given in parentheses) are listed in this order from left to right: Craig Revel Horwood, Darcey Bussell, Len Goodman, Alesha Dixon, Bruno Tonioli.

Musical guest: Lily Allen — "Not Fair"

Each couple performed two routines, one of which was the Argentine tango and the other of which was selected by the judges. Couples are listed in the order they performed.

Couple	Scores	Dance	Music	Result
Chris & Ola	38 (7, 7, 8, 8, 8)	Rumba	"Total Eclipse of the Heart" — Bonnie Tyler	Safe
Chris & Ola	42 (8, 8, 9, 9, 8)	Argentine tango	"Bust Your Windows" — Jazmine Sullivan	Safe
Ali & Brian	42 (8, 8, 9, 8, 9)	Argentine tango	"Pa Bailar" — Bajofondo Tango Club	Eliminated
Ali & Brian	50 (10, 10, 10, 10, 10)	American Smooth	"Come Dance with Me" — Frank Sinatra	Eliminated
Ricky W. & Natalie	47 (9, 9, 10, 9, 10)	Waltz	"Kissing You" — Des'ree	Safe
Ricky W. & Natalie	49 (9, 10, 10, 10, 10)	Argentine tango	"Verano Porteno" — Astor Piazzolla	Safe

=== Week 14: Final ===
Individual judges' scores in the charts below (given in parentheses) are listed in this order from left to right: Craig Revel Horwood, Darcey Bussell, Len Goodman, Alesha Dixon, Bruno Tonioli.

Show 1

Musical guests: Alesha Dixon & Bruce Forsyth — "Something's Gotta Give"

Each couple performed one routine, their highest-scoring ballroom dance and then both couples participated in a group Lindy Hop for individual points. Couples are listed in the order they performed.

Couple	Scores	Dance	Music
Ricky W. & Natalie	50 (10, 10, 10, 10, 10)	Quickstep	"Down with Love" — Holly Palmer & Michael Bublé
Chris & Ola	46 (9, 9, 9, 10, 9)	Foxtrot	"I Could Have Danced All Night" — Frank Sinatra
Chris & Ola	44 (8, 9, 9, 9, 9)	Group; Lindy Hop	"Sing, Sing, Sing" — Louis Prima
Ricky W. & Natalie	43 (8, 8, 9, 9, 9)	Group; Lindy Hop	"Sing, Sing, Sing" — Louis Prima

Show 2

Each couple performed two routines, their highest scoring Latin dance and their Showdance. Couples are listed in the order they performed.

Couple	Scores	Dance	Music	Result
Chris & Ola	50 (10, 10, 10, 10, 10)	Charleston	"Fat Sam's Grand Slam" — Bugsy Malone	Winners
Chris & Ola	46 (9, 9, 9, 10, 9)	Showdance	"Do You Love Me" — The Contours	Winners
Ricky W. & Natalie	48 (9, 10, 9, 10, 10)	Cha-cha-cha	"Sunshine of Your Love" — Spanky Wilson	Runners-up
Ricky W. & Natalie	49 (10, 9, 10, 10, 10)	Showdance	"Last Dance" — Donna Summer	Runners-up

== Dance chart ==
The celebrities and professional partners danced one of these routines for each corresponding week:

- Week 1: Cha-cha-cha or rumba AND tango or waltz; group merengue
- Week 2: Cha-cha-cha or rumba AND tango or waltz; group merengue
- Week 3: One unlearned dance (paso doble or quickstep)
- Week 4: One unlearned dance (foxtrot or salsa)
- Week 5: One unlearned dance (jive or Viennese waltz)
- Week 6: One unlearned dance (American Smooth or samba)
- Weeks 7–10: One unlearned dance
- Week 11: Charleston or rock 'n' roll AND group Viennese waltz
- Week 12 (Quarterfinal): Two unlearned dances
- Week 13 (Semifinal): Argentine tango & judges' choice
- Week 14 (Final): Highest-scoring ballroom dance, highest-scoring Latin dance, group Lindy Hop & showdance

Strictly Come Dancing (series 7) - Dance chart
Couple	Week																					
Couple	1		2		3	4	5	6	7	8	9	10	11		12		13		14			
Chris & Ola	Tango	Rumba	Group; Merengue		Quickstep	Salsa	Jive	American Smooth	Cha-cha-cha	Foxtrot	Paso doble	Viennese waltz	Charleston	Group; Viennese waltz	Waltz	Samba	Rumba	Argentine tango	Foxtrot	Group; Lindy Hop	Charleston	Showdance
Ricky W. & Natalie	Group; Merengue		Waltz	Rumba	Paso doble	Salsa	Viennese waltz	Samba	Quickstep	Tango	Jive	American Smooth	Rock 'n' roll	Group; Viennese waltz	Foxtrot	Cha-cha-cha	Waltz	Argentine tango	Quickstep	Group; Lindy Hop	Cha-cha-cha	Showdance
Ali & Brian	Waltz	Rumba	Group Merengue		Quickstep	Salsa	Jive	American Smooth	Paso doble	Viennese waltz	Cha-cha-cha	Foxtrot	Charleston	Group; Viennese waltz	Tango	Samba	Argentine tango	American Smooth				
Laila & Anton	Group Merengue		Tango	Cha-cha-cha	Quickstep	Foxtrot	Jive	Samba	Viennese waltz	Paso doble	Rumba	Waltz	Charleston	Group; Viennese waltz	American Smooth	Salsa						
Natalie & Vincent	Group Merengue		Tango	Cha-cha-cha	Paso doble	Salsa	Viennese waltz	American Smooth	Jive	Quickstep	Foxtrot	Samba	Rock 'n' roll	Group; Viennese waltz								
Ricky G. & Erin	Waltz	Cha-cha-cha	Group Merengue		Paso doble	Foxtrot	Jive	American Smooth	Rumba	Salsa	Viennese waltz	Tango										
Jade & Ian	Waltz	Cha-cha-cha	Group Merengue		Quickstep	Salsa	Viennese waltz	Samba	Foxtrot	Jive												
Phil & Katya	Group Merengue		Waltz	Cha-cha-cha	Quickstep	Salsa	Viennese waltz	Samba	Tango	Rumba	American Smooth											
Craig & Flavia	Group Merengue		Tango	Rumba	Quickstep	Foxtrot	Jive	Samba	Waltz	Cha-cha-cha												
Zöe & James	Group Merengue		Waltz	Rumba	Paso doble	Foxtrot	Jive	American Smooth	Samba													
Jo & Brendan	Group Merengue		Tango	Rumba	Paso doble	Foxtrot	Viennese waltz	Samba														
Joe & Kristina	Tango	Cha-cha-cha	Group Merengue		Paso doble	Foxtrot	Jive															
Lynda & Darren	Tango	Cha-cha-cha	Group Merengue		Paso doble	Foxtrot																
Rav & Aliona	Tango	Rumba	Group Merengue		Quickstep																	
Richard & Lilia	Group Merengue		Waltz	Cha-cha-cha																		
Martina & Matthew	Waltz	Rumba																				

== Reception ==
In September 2009 Strictly Come Dancing earned a place in the Guinness World Records as the "most successful reality television format", with licensing rights sold to broadcasters in 38 countries. Nonetheless, the sixth series' audiences had suffered as a result of direct clashes with ITV rival The X Factor. The BBC's decision in August 2009 to screen the seventh series on Saturday nights only was partly an attempt to reduce conflict with the rival talent show, as ITV had hinted that The X Factor's results show would be broadcast on Sunday evening. Sources at the BBC described the move as "better for the viewers... people at home lose out if things are competing against one another... We wanted to make Strictly Come Dancing an unmissable TV event".

However, the BBC still came under intense criticism when the extended Saturday show, initially running from 7–9pm, clashed almost entirely with The X Factor's main show. ITV sources accused the BBC of "effectively splitting the audience". Writing in The Guardian George Dixon, head of scheduling for BBC One, argued that "the ability of viewers to see programmes again, whether via personal video recorders like Sky+, online catch-up services including iPlayer or on channels such as E4 or ITV2, [makes] the notion of 'forcing' viewers to watch... outdated", adding that "There are around seven repeats of The X Factor on ITV1 and ITV2 each week".

The scheduling conflict ended with The X Factor securing a higher audience throughout the series. On 22 October 2009, the BBC rescheduled the Saturday show, now down to eight contestants, so that the overlap between the two programs was only 45 minutes. The BBC denied that the move was in direct response to the success of its ITV rival, saying instead that the move was to accommodate a new series with impressionist Jon Culshaw. Strictly Come Dancing's runtime, previously fixed at two hours, was also expected to decrease as contestants were progressively eliminated, leading to a further reduction in overlap.

== Ratings ==
Weekly ratings for each show on BBC One. All ratings are provided by BARB.

Episode	Date	Official rating (millions)	Weekly rank for BBC One	Weekly rank for all UK TV
Week 1	18 September	8.92	2	6
Week 1 results	19 September	8.43	5	9
Week 2	25 September	8.10	6	12
Week 2 results	26 September	8.68	2	7
Week 3	3 October	9.06	2	6
Week 4	10 October	8.82	4	11
Week 5	17 October	8.44	4	11
Week 6	24 October	8.88	5	12
Week 7	31 October	9.14	2	8
Week 8	7 November	9.46	2	7
Week 9	14 November	10.10	1	4
Week 10	21 November	9.59	3	11
Week 11	28 November	9.73	1	6
Week 12	5 December	9.43	1	7
Week 13	12 December	8.94	2	8
Week 13 results	12 December	8.47	4	12
Week 14	19 December	10.50	2	2
Week 14 results	19 December	11.29	1	1
Series average (excl. launch show)	2009	9.22	—N/a	—N/a
