= So You Think You Can Dance (British TV series) =

- Genre: Dance competition
- Created by: Simon Fuller; Nigel Lythgoe
- Developed by: Simon Fuller
- Directed by: James Morgan
- Presented by: Cat Deeley
- Judges: Nigel Lythgoe; Arlene Phillips; Louise Redknapp; Sisco Gomez
- Country of origin: United Kingdom
- Original language: English
- No. of episodes: 19

Production
- Executive producers: Nigel Lythgoe; Andrea Hamilton
- Producers: Anna Meedows; Gareth Davies; Ed Booth
- Production locations: Various (auditions); ExCeL London (Choreography camp); BBC Television Centre (live shows)
- Running time: 120 minutes
- Production companies: 19 Entertainment; Dick Clark Productions; BBC

Original release
- Network: BBC One
- Release: 2 January 2010 – 11 June 2011

So You Think You Can Dance is a televised dance competition and reality show that launched in the United Kingdom in January 2010 with a format based on an American show by the same name. The show was broadcast on BBC One. The presentation of the show is similar to that of the Pop Idol series of singing competitions, also created by Simon Fuller and Nigel Lythgoe. The show focuses not only on the contestants' talent, but also showcases new works by notable choreographers, crafted specifically for the contestants and the show.

== Programme history ==
So You Think You Can Dance is hosted by British entertainer Cat Deeley, who had also been the host of the U.S. version since season 2.

In the initial televised audition phase of the show, contestants dance in front of the judges – Nigel Lythgoe, Louise Redknapp, Arlene Phillips and Sisco Gomez – in the hope of getting through to the "choreography camp" round. After a further selection process, the judges decide who they would like to perform during the live shows of the competition, during which the public vote for their favourite act following a weekly live performance by a celebrity performer. The show does not have a specific type of dance, contestants can do what dance style they choose. However, they will be asked to learn other dances throughout the competition. The first contestant to win the title of "Britain's Favourite Dancer" was Charlie Bruce, who won in 2010.

It was initially announced that season two would have Alexandra Burke as a guest judge throughout the auditions and choreographer camp, to pull in more of the viewing audience. However, it was later announced that all four judges from season one would return as the main judges.

So You Think You Can Dance first premiered on 2 January 2010, beginning with one audition show, introducing the top 14 and others at audition. Five elimination rounds were followed by a final, with performances and results shown on the same night. The winner would receive a prize, and would earn the title of "Britain's Favourite Dancer". The winner received £100,000 cash and a trip to Hollywood, where the winner performed in the U.S. season finale.

The show was axed by BBC One due to the second series' low ratings, and because they had bought the broadcasting rights for the UK version of The Voice.

== Format ==
=== Auditions ===
The contestants would be held at a "producers" audition before getting to the second round, which is known as the "judges auditions" this is to help limit the number of audition contestants. During the second round contestants would auditions one by one in front of the panel of judges. This will make the judges decide if they would like to put the contestant through to the second round of the competition known as "choreography camp". The auditions are held around the UK in London, Manchester, Birmingham, Cardiff and Belfast. In order to find the next "British Favourite Dancer". However, a selection of auditions would only be shown on television. Judges will nominate whether they would like the contestant to continue in the competition. If three of the judges were to say "yes" and one judge to say "no" the contestant would go through. However, if two judges said "yes" and two judges said "no" you would not continue in the competition.

=== Choreography camp ===
The acts which the judges sent through to the next round would face "choreography camp". This part of the show would consist of whether the judges would like the contestant to continue in the show, to the live shows. The top 50 contestants are assigned to groups. Which they would be giving the time to spend and choreograph a type of performance the judges would ask for, (e.g. hip-hop, jazz, etc.). At the end of which the choreographers and judges chose the top 16. This would consist of the performances they give for the judges. They would be told straight after their performance if they would continue in the show. This is usually done gradually over the course of the entire week, with many contestants being cut from the competition on the very first day, and several more being cut each day, as the contestants are put through many different rounds to test their dance skills as well as their adaptability, learning speed, and stamina. Most rounds consist of the entire group of remaining contestants being taught a dance in a specific style (hip-hop, Broadway, and ballroom are among the most frequently-seen styles), and then performing the dance in front of the judges, a handful of contestants at a time. Another round consists of group work, where randomly chosen groups of four to six contestants are given a CD with a different song on it. Each group's members must then work together to create a choreographed group number for that song, and dance to it the next morning for the judges. At the end of this week of auditions, the judges meet and discuss each remaining contestant, to determine who will be chosen for the audience-vote portion of the competition (generally referred to as that season's "Top 20").

=== Live shows ===
During the live shows stage, each remaining contestant will perform a dance for the judges and the live audience, week after week. The public would get choose who they want to remain the competition by voting. The bottom two will perform again and then the judges will decide which act they would like to see again in the competition. The season finale consists of the top 4, and in addition to their solos, each also dances several other numbers, while being paired or grouped with the other contestants in such a way that "everyone dances with everyone." In addition, during the grand finale, contestants who were eliminated that season come back, and that season's favorite dances are showcased. At the end of the finale, the winner (the contestant with the highest number of audience votes from the night before) is revealed.

== Judges and presenters ==
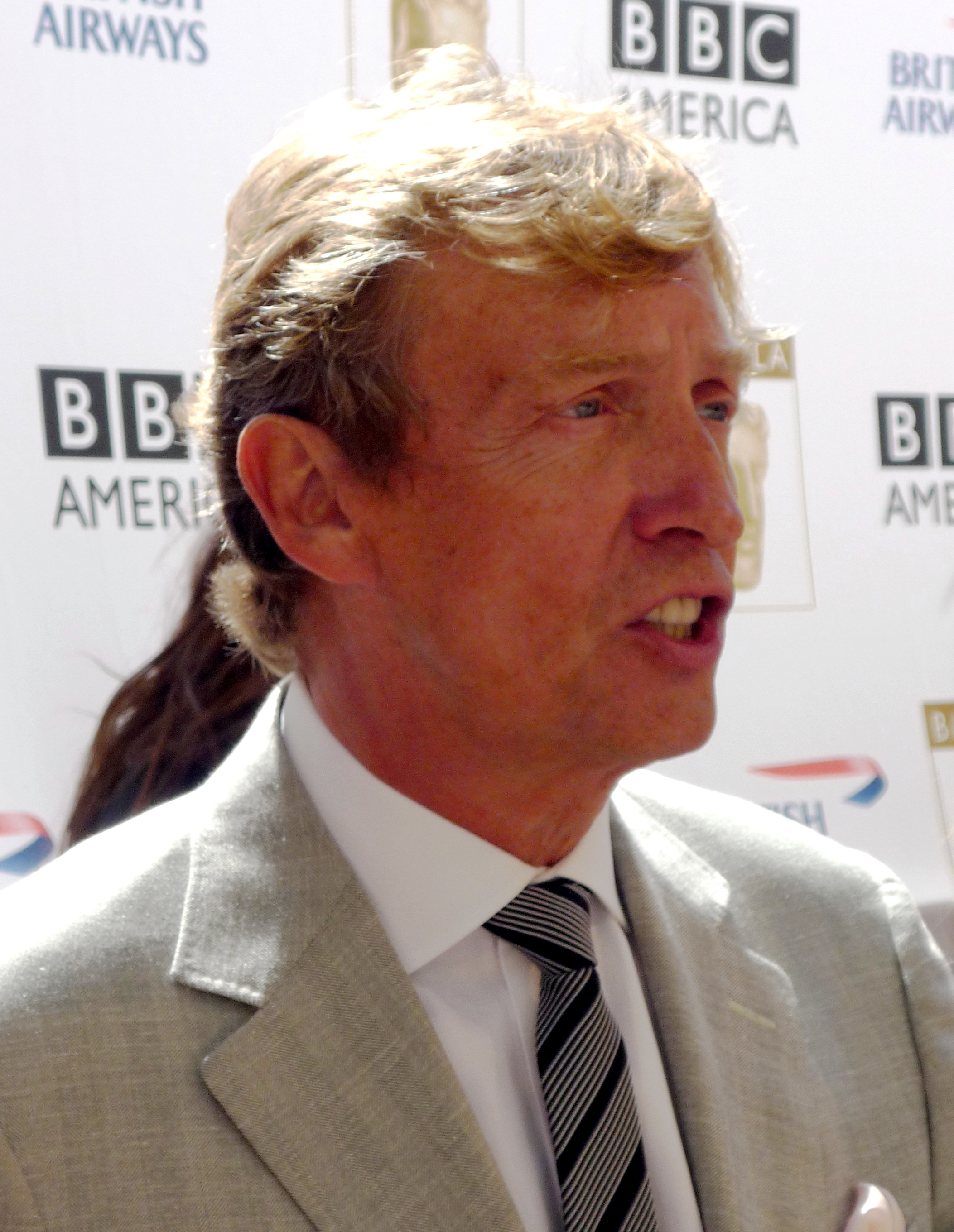
Nigel Lythgoe adapted SYTYCD from the American version that he first produced. He has been a permanent judge on both shows.

=== Judges ===
Show creator and producer Nigel Lythgoe, who also judges on the American version of the show, formed the original core judging panel with former Strictly Come Dancing judge Arlene Phillips. Lythgoe and Phillips were the only permanent judges in the audition process for the series, but guest judges Sisco Gomez and Louise Redknapp remained on the panel as permanent judges in the live shows. During the second series, Alexandra Burke featured as a guest judge throughout the auditions and Choreographer camp. John Barrowman also appeared as a guest judge on one live show, during the absence of Lythgoe.

=== Presenters and other personnel ===
Disc jockey and TV presenter, Cat Deeley, who also hosts the American original signed on to present the UK version in both series. The shows executive producers are former judge and creator Nigel Lythgoe and Claire Bridgham, and the producers of the show are Anna Meadows and Gareth Davies.

== Series ==
=== Finalists ===
| Season | Year(s) | Time | Winner | Finalists | | | Host | Judges | Guest judges |
|---|---|---|---|---|---|---|---|---|---|
| 1 | Winter 2010 | January–February | Charlie Bruce (jazz) | Tommy Franzén (hip-hop) | Lizzie Gough (hip-hop) | Robbie White (contemporary) | Cat Deeley | Nigel Lythgoe; Arlene Phillips; Louise Redknapp; Sisco Gomez | Priscilla Samuels |
| 2 | Spring 2011 | March–June | Matt Flint (tap) | Luke Jackson (contemporary) | Katie Love (contemporary) | Kirsty Swain (jazz) | Cat Deeley | Nigel Lythgoe; Arlene Phillips; Louise Redknapp; Sisco Gomez | Alexandra Burke; John Barrowman |

=== Series 1 ===
The preliminary auditions for the first series of the show were held in major cities throughout the UK in October 2009. Participants for the show had to be aged between 18 and 35 and could be amateur dancers or professionals who are not currently engaged in a professional contract. The BBC promoted auditions for the show via its official website.

The first series of So You Think You Can Dance began on 2 January 2010 and was hosted by Cat Deeley. The first episode showed the auditions from London, Manchester, choreography camp and the top 14 were revealed. Permanent judges at the start of the auditions were Nigel Lythgoe and Arlene Phillips, they were joined by Sisco Gomez, Louise Redknapp and Priscilla Samuels as guest judges during the audition process. Redknapp later became a permanent judge and joined the panel at the 'choreography camp' stage of the show.

The next 6 shows where the live shows, Gomez became a permanent judge at this stage of the competition. Every week 2 contestants (each gender: one female and one male) were eliminated from the competition until there were 4 contestants left (each gender: 2 females and 2 males).

The finale of the first series of So You Think You Can Dance was held on 13 February 2010. Robbie White was injured, and could not perform. Lizzie Gough finished third, Tommy Franzén was the season runner-up, but female jazz dancer Charlie Bruce ended up as the winner. Lythgoe said that Bruce absolutely was the best contestant of the season and to watch "small" dancers Bruce and Franzén grow across the series was fabulous.

=== Series 2 ===
The show hosted auditions in Manchester on 17 October 2010, Glasgow on 19 October 2010 and London on 21 and 22 October, according to the website, contestants also auditioned in Cardiff and Belfast. Arlene Phillips, Sisco Gomez, Nigel Lythgoe and Louise Redknapp all returned to the panel for series two. Series two has Alexandra Burke as a guest judge during the auditions and choreography camp. On the second part of the choreography camp, after Burke left the panel, John Barrowman was brought in as guest judge. Matt Flint was the winner of the series.

== See also ==
- Strictly Come Dancing
- Dance on television
