= Ryan Francois =

Swing dancer, choreographer and actor

- Occupations: Dancer; Choreographer
- Years active: 1984–present
- Website: http://ryanfrancois.com/RFX/Home.html

Ryan Francois is a swing dancer, choreographer and actor, who played a central part of the revival of the Lindy Hop . Specialising in dances related to the Jazz & Swing era - including the Lindy Hop, Charleston, Tap and Authentic Vernacular Jazz, Ryan has over 30 years dance experience.

Ryan learned from and danced with Frankie Manning as well as Pepsi Bethel, George Lloyd and Mama Lu Parks.

== Biography ==
Choreography for the UK TV shows:

- Strictly Come Dancing
- So You Think You Can Dance (UK Series 1)
- So You Think You Can Dance (UK Series 2)

Founder and artistic director of the dance companies: Swing X-Treme and Zoots and Spangles.

Choreographed the swing dance Jitterbug Stroll (1992).

Appeared in the musical Swing! by Paul Kelly.

Co-choreographer for Feelin In The Mood musical.

== TV ==
- DANCING WITH THE STARS ABC Network TVGuest Artist
- STRICTLY COME DANCING BBC1Choreographer & Performing Artist
- BRITAIN’S GOT TALENT
- DANCING ON ICE
- SO YOU THINK YOU CAN DANCE
- THE ALAN TITCHMARSH SHOW
- THE PAUL O’GRADY SHOW Channel 4 Choreographer Artist
- STRICTLY DANCE FEVER – SERIES 1 AND 2 BBC1 Coach & Performing Artist
- COME DANCING BBC1. Ballroom Dance Series Choreographer & Guest Artist
- THE ROSIE O'DONNELL SHOW Sing Sing Sing the cast of Broadway’s 'SWING' Choreographer
- THE TONY AWARDS The cast of' 'SWING!' Choreographer & performer
- MACY'S THANKSGIVING DAY PARADE the cast of Broadway’s 'SWING' Choreographer
- THE CHILDREN'S ROYAL VARIETY PERFORMANCE BBC. TV Charity Event
- WE SING WE DANCE Channel 4 Documentary about "The Nicolas Brothers"
- TALKING TELEPHONES Carlton TV. Phone in Game Show

== Movies ==
- IDLEWILD Universal Pictures – Starring Outkast Own Choreography
- THE POLAR EXPRESS Castle Rock – Director Robert Zemeckis Swing Elf
- LACKAWANNA BLUES Emmy Winner HBO FILMS Dancer
- MALCOLM X M.G. M. Movie - Director Spike Lee Dancer
- SWING KIDS Disney Movie - Director Thomas Carter Assistant Choreographer
- SHORE LEAVE British Film School Short - Starring Joanne Whalley Kilmer Choreographer

== COMMERCIALS ==
RUFFLES CHRISP'S

CADBURY'S CHOCOLATE

KAPPAL CLOTHES

BUBBALICIOUS

== MUSIC VIDEO'S ==
- TWO COUSINS
- DR. DR. Artists: SHAKATAK Choreographer & Main Artist
- SAY ITS NOT TOO LATE Artist: MATT BIANCO Dancer / Choreographer
- WHY CAN'T WE LIVE TOGETHER Artist: TIMMY THOMAS Dancer / Choreographer
- THIS IS THE RIGHT TIME Artist: LISA STANSFIELD Dancer
- WOMAN TO MAN Artist: HARRIET Dancer / Choreographer
- RIDING HIGH Artist: ROBERT PALMER Dancer /Choreographer
- MAKE IT WITH YOU Artists: THE PASADENA'S Choreographer

== Awards ==
Twice winner of the U.S. Open and American Swing Dance Champion.

Nominated for a Tony Award on Broadway.
