= Swing! =

1999 musical by Paul Kelly

- Music: Various
- Lyrics: Various
- Book: Paul Kelly
- Productions: 1999 Broadway

Swing! is a musical conceived by Paul Kelly with music by various artists. It celebrates the music of the Swing era of jazz (1930s–1946), including many well-known tunes by artists like Duke Ellington, William "Count" Basie, Benny Goodman and others. It received a nomination for the 2000 Tony Award for Best Musical and other Tony Awards.

== Productions ==
Swing! premiered on Broadway at the St. James Theatre on December 9, 1999 and closed on January 14, 2001, running for 461 performances. The director and choreographer was Lynne Taylor-Corbett, and the production was supervised by Jerry Zaks. Among the cast were Laura Benanti, Ann Hampton Callaway and Everett Bradley. A US tour began Nov 20, 2000 at the Ahmanson Theatre in Los Angeles.

The Pittsburgh Civic Light Opera production, directed and choreographed by one of the original cast members, Dana Solimando, ran in June 2009.

The original cast album was released by Sony Classical on January 18, 2000. The original cast album was nominated for a Grammy in the "Musical Show" category.

== Premise ==
Swing! combines high energy dancing, singing and acrobatics. There is no dialogue in the show, and the story is told entirely through music and dance. The show tries to recreate the swing style of jazz, which used large bands, fixed musical arrangements and solo-driven improvisations. Together with the development of the music, various forms of swing dancing emerged, varying by geographic regions, such as the Lindyhop or Jitterbug in Harlem or the Whip in Houston.

There are also story-driven numbers for example "I'll Be Seeing You", with Scott Fowler and Carol Bentley doing a Gene Kelly kind of ballet.

The show includes music and dance styles from early swing, West Coast, to other jazz styles, and even hip-hop (as shown as in an all-male version of "Boogie Woogie Bugle Boy"). Some of the individual couples, for example Ryan Francois and Jenny Thomas, perform their own choreography. Francois and Thomas are established stars in the world of swing, having been the Lindy champions in 1997 The American Swing Dance Championships and the U.S. Open Championships.

Some of the songs have new lyrics, but most are well-known swing-era hits, including "It Don't Mean a Thing (If It Ain't Got That Swing)"; "Sing, Sing, Sing", "Jumpin at the Woodside"; and "Boogie Woogie Bugle Boy (of Company B)".

== Songs ==
Act I

- "It Don't Mean a Thing (If It Ain't Got That Swing)" – Lyrics by Irving Mills, Music by Duke Ellington
- "Air Mail Special" – Music by Benny Goodman, James Mundy and Charlie Christian
- "Jersey Bounce" – Lyrics by Buddy Feyne, Music by Tiny Bradshaw, Eddie Johnson, and Bobby Plater
- "Opus One" – Music by Don George, Johnny Hodges and Harry James
- "Jumpin' at the Woodside" – Music by Count Basie
- "Bounce Me, Brother (with a Solid Four)" (from Buck Privates) – Music and Lyrics by Don Raye and Hughie Prince
- "Two and Four" – Music by Ann Hampton Callaway
- "Hit Me with a Hot Note and Watch Me Bounce" – Lyrics by D. George, Music by D. Ellington
- "Rhythm" – Music by Casey MacGill
- "Throw That Girl Around" – Music and Lyrics by Everett Bradley, Ilene Reid and Michael Heitzman
- "Show Me What You Got" – Music by Jonathan Smith and E. Bradley
- "Bli Blip" (from Jump for Joy) – Lyrics by Sid Kuller, Music by D. Ellington
- "Billy-A-Dick" – Paul Francis Webster and additional lyrics by Seán Martin Hingston, Music by Hoagy Carmichael
- "Harlem Nocturne" – Music by Earle Hagen and Dick Rogers
- "Kitchen Mechanics' Night Out" – Music and Lyrics by J. Smith, Paul Kelly, Lynne Taylor-Corbett and C. MacGill
- "Shout and Feel It" – Music by C. Basie
- "Boogie Woogie Bugle Boy (of Company B)" (from Buck Privates) – Music and Lyrics by D. Raye and H. Prince
- "G.I. Jive" – Music and Lyrics by Johnny Mercer
- "A String of Pearls" – Lyrics by Eddie DeLange, Music by Jerry Gray
- "(I've Got a Gal In) Kalamazoo" – Lyrics by Mack Gordon, Music by Harry Warren
- "Candy" – Music and Lyrics by Mack David, Joan Whitney Kramer and Alex Kramer
- "I'm Gonna Love You Tonight" – Lyrics by Jack Murphy, Music by C. MacGill
- "I'll Be Seeing You" (from Right This Way) – Lyrics by Irving Kahal, Music by Sammy Fain
- "In the Mood" – Lyrics by Andy Razaf, Music by Joe Garland
- "Don't Sit Under the Apple Tree (with Anyone Else but Me)" – Lyrics by Lew Brown and Charles Tobias, Music by Sam H. Stept

Act II

- "Swing! Brother, Swing!" – Music and Lyrics by Walter Bishop, Sr., Lewis Raymond and Clarence Williams
- "Caravan" – Lyrics by I. Mills, Music by Juan Tizol and D. Ellington
- "Dancers in Love" – Music by D. Ellington
- "Cry Me a River" – Music and Lyrics by Arthur Hamilton
- "Blues in the Night" – Lyrics by J. Mercer, Music by Harold Arlen
- "Take Me Back To Tulsa"/"Stay A Little Longer" – Music by Bob Wills and Tommy Duncan
- "Boogie Woogie Country" – Music by J. Murphy and Jonathan Smith
- "All of Me" – Lyrics by Seymour Simons, Music by Gerald Marks
- "I Won't Dance" (from Roberta) – Dorothy Fields and Additional lyrics by Ann Hampton Callaway, Music by Jerome Kern
- "Bill's Bounce" – Music by Bill Elliott
- "Stompin' at the Savoy" – Additional lyrics by Ann Hampton Callaway and Andy Razaf, Music by Benny Goodman, Edgar Sampson and Chick Webb
- "Swing, Brother, Swing" (Reprise) – Music and Lyrics by Walter Bishop, Lewis Raymond and Clarence Williams
- "Sing,_Sing,_Sing_(With_a_Swing)" – Music and Lyrics by Louis Prima, Andy Razaf and Leon Berry
- "It Don't Mean a Thing (If It Ain't Got That Swing)" (Reprise) – Lyrics by Irving Mills, Music by Duke Ellington

== Awards and nominations ==
=== Original Broadway production ===
Year	Award Ceremony	Category	Nominee	Result	Ref
2000	Drama Desk Award	Outstanding Musical		Nominated	
2000	Drama Desk Award	Outstanding Choreography	Lynne Taylor-Corbett	Nominated	
2000	Drama Desk Award	Outstanding Orchestrations	Harold Wheeler	Nominated	
2000	Theatre World Award		Everett Bradley	Won	
2000	Theatre World Award		Ann Hampton Callaway	Won	
2000	Tony Award	Best Musical		Nominated	
2000	Tony Award	Best Performance by a Featured Actress in a Musical	Laura Benanti	Nominated	
2000	Tony Award	Best Performance by a Featured Actress in a Musical	Ann Hampton Callaway	Nominated	
2000	Tony Award	Best Direction of a Musical	Lynne Taylor-Corbett	Nominated	
2000	Tony Award	Best Choreography	Lynne Taylor-Corbett	Nominated	
2000	Tony Award	Best Orchestrations	Harold Wheeler	Nominated	
