= Arlene Phillips =

English choreographer and TV judge

Dame Arlene Phillips DBE
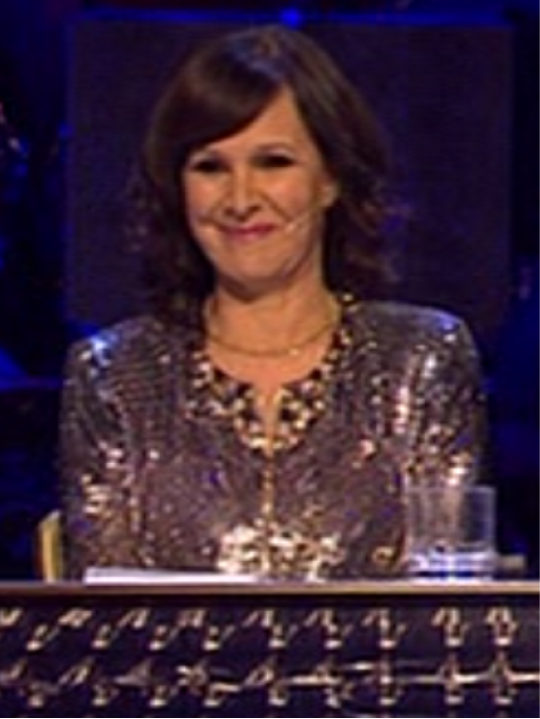
- Phillips in 2009
- Born: 22 May 1943 (age 83); Prestwich, Lancashire, England
- Occupation: Choreographer
- Years active: 1976–present
- Known for: Theatre choreographer; director; television personality; television judge; former dancer
- Notable work: Annie; Starlight Express; Saturday Night Fever; Hot Gossip; Loose Women; Strictly Come Dancing; So You Think You Can Dance; We Will Rock You
- Partner: Angus Ion (1985–present)
- Awards: Laurence Olivier Award; Carl Alan Award
- Website: arlenephillips.com arlenelive.com

Dame Arlene Phillips DBE (born 22 May 1943) is an English choreographer, theatre director, talent scout, former television judge, presenter, and dancer. She reached mainstream fame on television as a judge on Strictly Come Dancing (2004-2008) and So You Think You Can Dance (2010-2011). She has also achieved success as a stage choreographer on musicals including Starlight Express (1987), Grease (1993 and 2022), Saturday Night Fever (1998), and Guys and Dolls (2023).

== Early life ==
Phillips was born on 22 May 1943 in Prestwich, Lancashire. She has a brother, Ian and a sister, Karen. She attended Broughton Preparatory School, Cheetham Hill, Manchester; Beaver Road Primary School, Didsbury; and Manchester Central High School for Girls after passing the eleven plus exam. When Phillips was 15, her mother, who had been suffering from leukaemia, died aged 43 just before Phillips was due to take her exams.

Phillips originally wanted to be a ballet dancer and began dance classes at the age of three, receiving a grant from the local council to study ballet and tap dance at the Muriel Tweedy School in Manchester after leaving school at 16. Her mother had always expressed a desire to dance, which inspired Phillips into pursuing dance professionally.

== Professional career ==
Phillips is internationally renowned as a choreographer and director of West End and Broadway musicals, but has many other professional credits. In her mid-teens, Phillips moved to London. where she developed her own style of jazz dance, strongly influenced by American Modern Jazz dance popular in London at that time. She went on to teach her style of jazz dance at The Dance Centre, later named Pineapple Dance Studios in Covent Garden, and at the Italia Conti Stage School, so establishing herself as a successful teacher and choreographer.

Phillips was the choreographer for the 1982 film Annie and the promotional video for the Duran Duran song The Wild Boys, named Best British Video at the 1985 BRIT Awards. In the summer of 1996, she was stage director on the opening run of Michael Flatley's Irish dance show, Lord of the Dance at Dublin's Point Theatre.

Phillips choreographed the 2002 Commonwealth Games opening and closing ceremonies alongside fellow Mancunian, David Zolkwer.

From 2004 to 2008, she was a judge on the BBC One show Strictly Come Dancing, and commented on the acts in Eurovision: Your Country Needs You for the BBC in 2009. In 2008, she created, produced, and choreographed the ITV television serial Britannia High.

Following Phillips's appearance on Your Country Needs You, she choreographed the performance of the United Kingdom in the Eurovision Song Contest 2009. She went on to choreograph Engelbert Humperdinck's performance of the UK entry in the 2012 contest in Baku.

In March 2013, Arlene appeared on Let's Dance For Comic Relief in the Dance Judge Panel with Greg James and Lee Mack.

== Hot Gossip ==
In Britain, Phillips first became a household name as the director and choreographer of Hot Gossip, a British dance troupe which she formed in 1974. The group's performances were considered risqué at the time. Hot Gossip spent two years performing in a London night club where Phillips and her manager developed the group's dance act.

== Strictly Come Dancing ==
Phillips was a member of the inaugural judging panel between 2004 and 2008 for the BBC television series Strictly Come Dancing, alongside fellow judges Len Goodman, Craig Revel Horwood, and Bruno Tonioli.

In 2005 and 2006, Phillips was a judge for the spin-off series Strictly Dance Fever, which was also created by the BBC to seek dancers wishing to join the chorus of a West End musical. Later in 2007, she created and judged another BBC dance series, DanceX, a show formed to find a new commercial dance act. After the initial audition process, the competitors were split into two troupes of dancers, with Phillips mentoring one troupe and the other being mentored by her fellow Strictly Come Dancing judge Bruno Tonioli. The two troupes competed live on television each week, with Tonioli's troupe being the eventual winners.

=== Departure from Strictly Come Dancing ===
After the close of the 2008 series of Strictly Come Dancing, the BBC announced that several changes would be made to refresh the show in 2009. This led to a great deal of speculation in the media that Phillips might be dropped from the judging panel, but the BBC refused to respond to reports. They finally confirmed the news at the launch of their autumn schedule on 9 July 2009: she was replaced by former Strictly winner Alesha Dixon. The news led to much criticism being directed towards the BBC for its apparent discrimination against older women on television; the BBC, however, strongly denied this.

The replacement of Phillips led to an unprecedented intervention from the then Minister for Women and Equality, Harriet Harman. During a session in the House of Commons, Harman responded to questions stating that she believed the decision to drop Arlene Phillips was motivated by age discrimination, and called on the BBC to ensure that she would be taking part in the new series. The BBC did not formally respond to Harman's request, but repeated its comments that the decision was not due to age.

== Later activities ==
In October 2009, Phillips appeared on the first episode of the 38th series of the satirical show Have I Got News for You. Between April and July 2010, she made nine guest panellist appearances on ITV's flagship show Loose Women.

=== Britannia High ===
In 2007, Phillips became the Executive Producer and Creative Director for the ITV television series Britannia High. The show was a fictional drama about the lives of six students at a London performing arts school. Based on an idea by Phillips and West End producer David Ian, the series was marketed as the UK's answer to Disney's High School Musical. The show's music was created and written by hit songwriter, and Take That frontman, Gary Barlow.

=== So You Think You Can Dance? ===
Phillips has also been a judge on the UK version of So You Think You Can Dance?. The show's original creator Nigel Lythgoe is head judge on the series, and Phillips is joined on the panel by pop singer Louise Redknapp, and dancer and choreographer Sisco Gomez. Phillips's appointment as judge for the series came soon after the controversy over her departure from Strictly Come Dancing. The first episode aired on BBC One in January 2010, and a second series in 2011.

=== Gala for Grenfell ===
In July 2017, Phillips announced a dance gala to raise funds for those affected by the Grenfell Tower fire. The Gala for Grenfell took place on 30 July 2017 at the Adelphi Theatre, London and included stars from Strictly Come Dancing, The Royal Ballet and Sir Matthew Bourne's New Adventures company. Phillips said of the dancers taking part "They’re just doing it as themselves because each of the dancers is giving a gift and I want you to see them, and that they’re doing it for the love". The proceeds from the event went to the Kensington & Chelsea Foundation, the charity running the Grenfell Tower Fund.

=== Spoken word tour ===
In 2017, Phillips embarked on a UK-wide spoken word tour, in conversation with Jacquie Storey.

=== Holding Back the Years ===
In 2017, Phillips was a presenter on the BBC One series Holding Back the Years.

=== I'm a Celebrity...Get Me Out of Here! ===
In November 2021, Phillips at the age of 78 became the oldest ever contestant to appear on ITV's I'm a Celebrity...Get Me Out of Here!. The record was formerly held by Stanley Johnson who took part in the 17th series of the show at the age of 77. Phillips participated in series 21 of the show and was the first celebrity eliminated.

=== Dancing on Ice ===
On 20 February 2022, Phillips joined ITV's Dancing on Ice as a guest Judge for Musicals week.

=== Toys the Musical ===
On 10 October 2024, Phillips joined Toys as the executive co-producer. Phillips said at the time "I’ve been involved with Toys for many years, with the super talented and much missed Phil Edwards. I am delighted that Paul Morrissey and I can start the adventure of Toys coming to life and I’m thrilled to be producing this show with him." Toys only played for a short period with one reviewer writing "Although the story is a bit challenging to follow and there is lots of exposition to digest, there’s also lots of heart and thoughtful life lessons about the value of toys as therapeutic tools as well as playthings."

== Honours ==
Phillips was appointed Officer of the Order of the British Empire (OBE) in the 2001 Birthday Honours, Commander of the Order of the British Empire (CBE) in the 2013 New Year Honours for services to dance and charity, and Dame Commander of the Order of the British Empire (DBE) in the 2021 Birthday Honours for services to dance and charity.

== Personal life ==
Phillips has been in a relationship with Angus Ion, a set builder, since 1985. The couple first met on the set of the music video for the Freddie Mercury song "I Was Born to Love You".

== Alana Dancing Star books ==
In 2010, Phillips wrote a series of children's fiction books. Alana Dancing Star is a series of six books, in which the title character explores different genres of dance. The series covers ballroom dance, samba, hip-hop, Bollywood, Broadway, and tango. In summer 2011, one of the books, Viennese Waltz, was selected to be part of Richard and Judy's Summer Children's Reading List.

== Discography ==
Year	Title	UK Chart Position
1982	Keep in Shape System with Arlene Phillips	No. 41
1984	Keep in Shape System Volume 2	No. 100

== Theatre credits ==
- Starlight Express – Apollo Victoria Theatre, 1984; Broadway, 1987
- A Clockwork Orange: A Play with Music – Barbican Centre for the Royal Shakespeare Company, 1990
- Matador – Queen's Theatre, 1991
- Grease – Dominion Theatre and Cambridge Theatre, 1993
- Saturday Night Fever – London Palladium, 1998
- We Will Rock You – Dominion Theatre, 2002
- The Sound of Music – London, 2006; Canada, 2008
- Flashdance – 2008; Shaftesbury Theatre, 2010–2011
- The Wizard of Oz – London Palladium, 2011
- Allelujah! – Bridge Theatre, 2018
- A Midsummer Night's Dream – Bridge Theatre, 2019
- What's New Pussycat? – Birmingham Repertory Theatre, 2021
- The Cher Show – UK & Ireland Tour, 2022 (director)
- Guys and Dolls – Bridge Theatre, 2023

== Film credits ==
- 1982: Annie
- 1983: Monty Python's The Meaning of Life
- 1984: "Private Dancer" (Tina Turner music video)
- 1985: Legend
- 1988: It Couldn't Happen Here
- 1988: Salome's Last Dance
- 1990: White Hunter Black Heart
- 1980: Can't Stop the Music
- 1996: The Wind in the Willows
- 1979: Escape to Athena
- 1981: The Fan

== Awards and nominations ==
Year	Award	Category	Work	Result	Ref
1987	41st Tony Awards	Best Choreography	Starlight Express Broadway	Nominated	
1994	1994 Laurence Olivier Awards	Best Theatre Choreographer	Grease (musical) Dominion Theatre	Nominated	
1999	1999 Laurence Olivier Awards	Best Theatre Choreographer	Saturday Night Fever (musical) London Palladium	Nominated	
2006	The Theatre Carl Alan Awards	Outstanding Services Award	Career achievement	Won	
2023	2023 WhatsOnStage Awards	Best Choreography	Grease, Dominion Theatre	Won	
2023	2023 Laurence Olivier Awards	Special Recognition award	Career achievement	Won	
2024	2024 Laurence Olivier Awards	Best Theatre Choreographer	Guys and Dolls (2023), Bridge Theatre	Won	

== See also ==
- List of dancers
