= Katya Virshilas =

Lithuanian-Canadian dancer and actress (born 1983)

- Born: 10 September 1983 (age 42); Lithuania
- Occupations: Actress, dancer
- Height: 1.67 m (5 ft 6 in)
- Spouse(s): Dmitry Ilyushenov (divorced); Klaus Kongsdal (7 July 2012–present)
- Children: 2

Katya Virshilas (born 10 September 1983) is a Lithuanian-Canadian dancer and actress.

== Early life ==
Virshilas was born in Lithuania, to a Jewish family. She subsequently moved to Israel at age 6, and to Vancouver, British Columbia, Canada, at thirteen. She began dancing at the age of 13.

== Career ==
She was a Vancouver British Columbia Dancesport Champion four times, from 1998 to 2002. In 2001, she and her partner won the Canadian Latin Dance Championship. Virshilas has appeared in the Hollywood films Shall We Dance? (2004), Take the Lead (2006) and John Tucker Must Die (both 2006), and in the television shows Smallville, Supernatural, Psych, and others.

Based in the United Kingdom from the start of her appearances in the BBC's Strictly Come Dancing series, she has since 2009 been professionally partnered with Danish dancer Klaus Kongsdal.

Virshilas toured the UK with Pasha Kovalev from 26 March 2012 in their own show.

== Strictly Come Dancing ==
She appeared as a professional dancer on series 7 (2009) of Strictly Come Dancing partnering cricketer Phil Tufnell. They were knocked out of the competition in week 9. On that week, they were in the bottom-two couples after a combination of the judges' points allocation and the audience's votes, alongside Ricky Groves and Erin Boag but were not saved by the judges.

Virshilas returned for the eighth series of the dancing show in autumn 2010 and was partnered with rugby player Gavin Henson. In week 1 they scored 28 (their highest so far) and in week 4 they scored 23 for a tango to Britney Spears's "Toxic". However, were knocked out on the semi-final. In the ninth series, she was paired with Dan Lobb who was at the time one of the presenters of Daybreak. However, they were eliminated in week 3 of the competition.

On 20 June 2012, it was announced that Virshilas would not appear in the tenth series.

Series	Partner	Place
7	Phil Tufnell	8th
8	Gavin Henson	5th
9	Dan Lobb	13th

Highest and Lowest Scoring Per Dance

Dance	Partner	Highest	Partner	Lowest
American Smooth	Phil Tufnell	28	Gavin Henson	27
Argentine Tango				
Cha-cha-cha	Gavin Henson	29	Phil Tufnell	22
Charleston				
Couple's Choice				
Foxtrot	Gavin Henson	33		
Jive	Gavin Henson	22		
Paso Doble	Gavin Henson	26		
Quickstep	Gavin Henson	33	Phil Tufnell	24
Rumba	Phil Tufnell	28	Gavin Henson	22
Salsa	Phil Tufnell	24	Gavin Henson	19
Samba	Gavin Henson	27	Phil Tufnell	25
Showdance				
Tango	Phil Tufnell	30	Gavin Henson	23
Viennese Waltz	Gavin Henson	31	Dan Lobb	24
Waltz	Phil Tufnell	29	Dan Lobb	24

=== Series 7 - with celebrity partner Phil Tufnell ===
Week №	Dance / Song	Judges' scores				Score	Result
Week №	Dance / Song	Horwood	Goodman	Dixon	Tonioli	Score	Result
1	Did not perform	-	-	-	-	-	-
2	Waltz / "Sam"; Cha-cha-cha / "Daddy"	7; 4	8; 6	7; 6	7; 6	29; 22	Safe
3	Quickstep / "Put on a Happy Face"	5	6	6	7	24	Safe
4	Salsa / "Long Train Runnin'"	4	7	6	7	24	Safe
5	Viennese Waltz / "Mad About the Boy"	6	7	7	7	27	Safe
6	Samba / "Daddy Cool"	6	7	6	6	25	Safe
7	Tango / "Back to Black"	7	7	8	8	30	Safe
8	Rumba / "Maybe I'm Amazed"	6	8	7	7	28	Safe
9	American Smooth / "Come Fly with Me"	7	8	8	8	28	Eliminated

=== Series 8 - with celebrity partner Gavin Henson ===
Week №	Dance / Song	Judges' scores				Score	Result
Week №	Dance / Song	Horwood	Goodman	Dixon	Tonioli	Score	Result
1	Waltz / "You Light Up My Life"	6	8	7	7	28	No Elimination
2	Salsa / "Don't Stop the Music"	3	6	5	5	19	Safe
3	Rumba / "Always on My Mind"	3	6	7	6	22	Safe
4	Tango / "Toxic"	5	6	6	6	23	Safe
5	Paso Doble / "Uprising"	5	7	7	7	26	Safe
6	Cha-cha-cha / "Don't Cha"	5	8	8	8	29	Safe
7	Quickstep / "I Want You to Want Me"	7	8	9	9	33	Safe
8	American Smooth / "She's a Lady"	4	7	8	8	27	Safe
9	Jive / "Hey Ya!"	3	6	7	6	22	Bottom two
10	Foxtrot / "Minnie the Moocher"	7	9	9	8	33	Safe
11	Samba / "Bamboleo"; Swing-a-thon / "In the Mood"; Viennese Waltz / "Yow Know Me"	6 Awarded; 6	7; 1; 9	7 Extra; 8	7 Point; 8	27; 28; 31	Eliminated

=== Series 9 - with celebrity partner Dan Lobb ===
Week №	Dance / Song	Judges' scores				Score	Result
Week №	Dance / Song	Horwood	Goodman	Dixon	Tonioli	Score	Result
1	Waltz / "Are You Lonesome Tonight?"	4	7	7	6	24	No Elimination
2	Salsa / "Upside Down"	4	6	6	5	21	Safe
3	Viennese Waltz / "Somebody to Love"	5	7	6	6	24	Eliminated

== So You Think You Can Dance ==
On the first series of the televised reality dancing competition So You Think You Can Dance, Virshilas choreographed or semi-choreographed four routines for different couples:

- Week 1 – helped James Jordan with the choreography of Robbie White and Yanet Fuentes's American Smooth style foxtrot
- Week 2 – choreographed (alongside professional partner Klaus) Mark Calape and Lizzie Gough's Viennese Waltz, which was highly praised by the judges
- Week 5 – choreographed (alongside professional partner Klaus) Mandy Montanez and Alastair Postlethwaite's Paso Doble, which was criticized by the judges for the lack of passion, in particular, Nigel Lythgoe, series creator and judge, said it was the worst performance the pair had given over the course of the whole series
- Week 6 (final) – choreographed (alongside professional partner Klaus) Lizzie Gough and Tommy Franzén's tango, much to the praise of the judges

Virshilas reappeared on the second series to choreograph more routines:

- Week 2 – choreographed (alongside professional partner Klaus) Stephanie Powell and Gian Luca Loddo's cha-cha-cha, which was praised by the judges, despite Powell and Loddo being placed in the bottom two couples by public vote and consequently eliminated
- Week 2 – choreographed (alongside professional partner Klaus) Alice Woodhouse and Charlie Wheeller's American Smooth style waltz, praised highly by the judges
- Week 7 – choreographed (alongside professional partner Klaus) the boys' group Paso Doble performance (Lee Bridgman, Luke Jackson and Matt Flint)
- Week 8 (final) – choreographed (alongside professional partner Klaus) Matt Flint and Kirsty Swain's American Smooth style waltz/foxtrot

== Personal life ==
Virshilas started dating Klaus Kongsdal in 2009 after the two met at the BBC bar. They announced their engagement in January 2011. The couple married on Saturday 7 July 2012 in a chateau in Loire Valley, France. The couple since then moved to Hong Kong and founded Ballroom Bees dance class for children below 6 years old, the dance courses are sold online and offline at YWCA.org and Kuddo. After Virshilas suffered a miscarriage in 2014, the couple had their first child, a boy, in May 2016.
