= Sisco Gomez =

English dancer and choreographer

Francisco Javier Gomez-Aspron (born 4 February 1985 in London, England), known professionally as Sisco Gomez, is an English dancer and choreographer. He was awarded the Best New Choreographer award at the UK satellite version of The Carnival: Choreographer's Ball in 2005.

== Career ==
=== Dancer ===
Sisco Gomez was born in 1985, and has five half siblings: Aurora, Antonio, Francisco, Evangelina and Rosalinda, and is of Afro-Colombian heritage. His father also called Francisco Gomez-Aspron who originates from Seville, Spain, was a draughtsman at the Seville shipyard and moved to England around 1954; his mother is from Cali, Colombia. Following in the footsteps of his mother, Sisco became a dancer. At school in Westminster he studied Musical theatre, Jazz and Tap. He also went to the Sylvia Young Theatre School and Pineapple Performing Arts School. At 16, Gomez joined the hip-hop company Culture Shock Dance Troupe - United Kingdom. He then studied Jazz and Hip-hop in the United States (New York) and also in a variety of European countries.
