= 30th Young Artist Awards =

2009 US media awards ceremony

- Official program
- Awarded for: Achievement in 2008 in film and television
- Date: March 29, 2009
- Site: Globe Theatre; Universal City, California
- Hosted by: Colin Ford and Selena Gomez

The 30th Young Artist Awards ceremony, presented by the Young Artist Association, honored excellence of young performers under the age of 21 in the fields of film, television and theater for the 2008 season, and took place on March 29, 2009, at Universal Studios' Globe Theatre in Universal City, California. Special guest performers for the ceremony that year included Russian musical artists, "Street Magic" and Las Vegas father and son acrobat team, "The Kalinins".

Established in 1978 by long-standing Hollywood Foreign Press Association member Maureen Dragone, the Young Artist Association was the first organization to establish an awards ceremony specifically set to recognize and award the contributions of performers under the age of 21 in the fields of film, television, theater and music.

== Categories ==
★ Bold indicates the winner in each category.

== Best Performance in a Feature Film ==
=== Best Performance in a Feature Film - Leading Young Actor ===
★ Nate Hartley - Drillbit Taylor - Paramount Pictures

- Freddie Highmore - The Spiderwick Chronicles - Paramount Pictures
- Josh Hutcherson - Journey to the Center of the Earth - Warner Brothers
- Skandar Keynes - The Chronicles of Narnia: Prince Caspian - Walt Disney Pictures

=== Best Performance in a Feature Film - Leading Young Actress ===
★ Dakota Fanning - The Secret Life of Bees - Fox Searchlight

- Abigail Breslin - Kit Kittredge: An American Girl - New Line Cinema
- Madeline Carroll - Swing Vote - Walt Disney Pictures
- Georgie Henley - The Chronicles of Narnia: Prince Caspian - Walt Disney Pictures
- Keke Palmer - The Longshots - MGM

=== Best Performance in a Feature Film - Supporting Young Actor ===
★ Brandon Soo Hoo - Tropic Thunder - DreamWorks SKG

- Dylan Everett - The Devil's Mercy - Peace Arch Entertainment
- Colin Ford - Lake City - Screen Media Films
- Nathan Gamble - Marley & Me - 20th Century Fox
- Devon Gearhart - Funny Games - Warner Independent Pictures
- Justin Jones - The Express: The Ernie Davis Story - Universal Pictures
- Johntae Lipscomb - Bedtime Stories - Universal Pictures
- Austin MacDonald - Kit Kittredge: An American Girl - New Line Cinema
- Zach Mills - Kit Kittredge: An American Girl - New Line Cinema

=== Best Performance in a Feature Film - Supporting Young Actress ===
★ Christian Serratos - Twilight - Summit Entertainment

- Madisen Beaty - The Curious Case of Benjamin Button - Warner Brothers
- Sammi Hanratty - Hero Wanted - Sony Pictures Entertainment
- Kali Majors - Baby Blues - Allumination Filmworks

=== Best Performance in a Feature Film - Young Ensemble Cast ===
★ Kit Kittredge: An American Girl - New Line Cinema

Abigail Breslin, Madison Davenport, Austin MacDonald, Zach Mills, Willow Smith and Max Thieriot

- The Chronicles of Narnia: Prince Caspian - Walt Disney Pictures

Georgie Henley, Skandar Keynes, William Moseley and Anna Popplewell

- Drillbit Taylor - Paramount Pictures

David Dorfman, Troy Gentile and Nate Hartley

== Best Performance in an International Feature Film ==
=== Best Performance in an International Feature Film - Leading Young Performers ===
★ Brandon Walters (Australia) - Australia - 20th Century Fox

- Hussein Al-Sous & Udey Al-Qiddissi (Jordan) - Captain Abu Raed - NeoClassics
- Asa Butterfield & Jack Scanlon (United Kingdom) - The Boy in the Striped Pyjamas - Heyday Films/Miramax Films
- Kåre Hedebrant & Lina Leandersson (Sweden) - Let the Right One In - Magnet Releasing
- Robbie Kay (United Kingdom) - Fugitive Pieces - Samuel Goldwyn Films
- Guang Li (Australia) - The Children of Huang Shi - Sony Pictures Classics
- Bill Milner & Will Poulter (United Kingdom) - Son of Rambow - Paramount Vantage
- Kodi Smit-McPhee (Australia) - Romulus, My Father - Magnolia Pictures
- Xu Jiao (China) - CJ7 - Sony Pictures Classics

== Best Performance in a Short Film ==
=== Best Performance in a Short Film - Young Actor ===
★ Cainan Wiebe - A Pickle

- Patrick Casa - Sizzlean
- Andy Scott Harris - The First Impression
- Joey Luthman - Stars and Suns
- Connor Kramme - Alex's Halloween
- Gig Morton - The Escape of Conrad Lardbottom
- Brandon Tyler Russell - Caleb Couldn't Love
- Randy Shelly - Settled at Sunrise
- Connor Stanhope - Illusional

=== Best Performance in a Short Film - Young Actress ===
★ Laytrel McMullen - Pudge

- Jasmine Jessica Anthony - Water Pills
- Megan Ashley - Wreck the Halls
- Megan McKinnon - Illusional
- Savannah McReynolds - Return to Sender
- Courtney Robinson - Little Miss Badass
- Emanuela Szumilas - The Corners of Our Rooms
- Chelsey Valentine - The Doll Hospital
- Jolie Vanier - Juvenile Delinquence

== Best Performance in a TV Movie, Miniseries or Special ==
=== Best Performance in a TV Movie, Miniseries or Special - Leading Young Actor ===
★ Alex Black - Generation Gap - RHI Entertainment

- Luke Benward - Minutemen - Disney Channel
- Jamie Johnston - The Tenth Circle - Lifetime Television
- Robbie Kay - Pinocchio - RAI Fiction
- Maxim Knight - Our First Christmas - RHI Entertainment
- Connor Christopher Levins - The Most Wonderful Time of the Year - Hallmark Channel
- Austin Majors - An Accidental Christmas - Lifetime Television
- Justin Martin - A Raising in the Sun - ABC
- Gig Morton - Christmas Town - Peace Arch Entertainment

=== Best Performance in a TV Movie, Miniseries or Special - Leading Young Actress ===
★ Selena Gomez - Another Cinderella Story - Warner Brothers

- Jordy Benattar - Charlie & Me - Hallmark Channel
- Demi Lovato - Camp Rock - Disney Channel
- Jennifer Lawrence - The Poker House - Phase 43 Films
- Miranda Cosgrove - Merry Christmas, Drake & Josh - Nickelodeon Productions

=== Best Performance in a TV Movie, Miniseries or Special - Supporting Young Actor ===
★ Joseph Castanon - Comanche Moon - CBS

- Adam Cagley - Merry Christmas Drake and Josh - Nickelodeon
- Alexander Conti - Snow 2: Brain Freeze - ABC Family
- David Gore - Merry Christmas Drake and Josh -Nickelodeon
- Steven Hinkle - John Adams - HBO
- Matthew Knight - The Good Witch - Hallmark Channel
- Uriah Shelton - The Nanny Express - Hallmark Channel
- Tyler Stentiford - The Memory Keeper's Daughter - Lifetime Television

=== Best Performance in a TV Movie, Miniseries or Special - Supporting Young Actress ===
★ Cassidi Hoag - The Two Mr. Kissels - Lifetime Television

- Hannah Endicott Douglas - The Good Witch - Hallmark Channel
- Jodelle Ferland - Celine - CBC
- Molly Jepson - Minutemen - Disney Channel
- Nicole Munoz - Another Cinderella Story - Warner Brothers

== Best Performance in a TV Series ==
=== Best Performance in a TV Series (Comedy or Drama) - Leading Young Actor ===
★ Graham Patrick Martin - The Bill Engvall Show - TBS

- Jake T. Austin - Wizards of Waverly Place - Disney Channel
- Jamie Johnston - Degrassi: The Next Generation - CTV
- Nathan Kress - iCarly - Nickelodeon
- Nat Wolff - The Naked Brothers Band - Nickelodeon

=== Best Performance in a TV Series (Comedy or Drama) - Leading Young Actress ===
★ Miranda Cosgrove - iCarly - Nickelodeon

- Miley Cyrus - Hannah Montana - Disney Channel
- Selena Gomez - Wizards of Waverly Place - Disney Channel
- Taylor Momsen - Gossip Girl - Warner Brothers
- Vanessa Morgan - The Latest Buzz - Decode Entertainment
- Shailene Woodley - The Secret Life of the American Teenager - ABC Family

=== Best Performance in a TV Series (Comedy or Drama) - Supporting Young Actor ===
★ Larramie "Doc" Shaw - Tyler Perry's House of Payne - TNT

- Moisés Arias - Hannah Montana - Disney Channel
- Skyler Gisondo - The Bill Engvall Show - TBS
- Mark Indelicato - Ugly Betty - ABC
- Ryan Malgarini - Gary Unmarried - CBS

=== Best Performance in a TV Series (Comedy or Drama) - Supporting Young Actress ===
★ Bella Thorne - My Own Worst Enemy - NBC

- Jennifer Lawrence - The Bill Engvall Show - TBS
- Jennette McCurdy - iCarly - Nickelodeon
- Kathryn Newton - Gary Unmarried - CBS
- Emily Osment - Hannah Montana - Disney Channel
- Erin Sanders - Zoey 101 - Nickelodeon

=== Best Performance in a TV Series - Guest Starring Young Actor ===
★ (tie) Carlos Knight - ER - NBC
★ (tie) Joey Luthman - Private Practice - ABC

- Jesse Bostick - Murdoch Mysteries - Bravo
- Nathan Gamble - House M.D. - FOX
- Hunter Gomez - The Suite Life of Zack & Cody - Disney Channel
- Isaiah Marcus Grant - The Border - White Pine Pictures
- Braeden Lemasters - Law & Order NBC
- Dylan Minnette - The Mentalist - CBS
- Remy Thorne - October Road - ABC
- Billy Unger - Medium - NBC
- Cainan Wiebe - Sanctuary - Sci-Fi Channel

=== Best Performance in a TV Series - Guest Starring Young Actress ===
★ Nicole Leduc - Supernatural - Warner Brothers

- Isabella Acres - The Mentalist - CBS
- Kaylee Dodson - Leverage - TNT
- Brighid Fleming - Criminal Minds - CBS
- Isabelle Fuhrman - Ghost Whisperer - CBS
- Joey King - CSI: Crime Scene Investigation - CBS
- Carly Schroeder - Ghost Whisperer - CBS
- Stefanie Scott - Chuck - NBC
- Car'ynn Sims - Everybody Hates Chris - CBS Paramount
- Bella Thorne - October Road - ABC

=== Best Performance in a TV Series - Recurring Young Actor ===
★ Mick Hazen - As the World Turns - CBS

- Eddie Alderson - One Life to Live - ABC
- Preston Bailey - Dexter - Showtime
- Aaron Hart - Mad Men - AMC
- Joey Luthman - Weeds - Showtime
- Dylan Minnette - Saving Grace - TNT
- Terrell Ransom, Jr - Days of Our Lives - NBC
- Connor Stanhope - Smallville - CW Television
- Austin Williams - One Life to Live - ABC

=== Best Performance in a TV Series - Recurring Young Actress ===
★ Erin Sanders - The Young and the Restless - CBS

- Kristen Alderson - One Life to Live - ABC
- Darcy Rose Byrnes - The Young and the Restless - CBS
- Danielle Hanratty - The Unit - FOX
- Haley Ramm - Without a Trace CBS
- Christina Robinson - Dexter - Showtime
- Kiernan Shipka - Mad Men - AMC
- Mackenzie Smith - Terminator: The Sarah Connor Chronicles - FOX
- Brittany Underwood - One Life to Live - ABC

=== Outstanding Young Ensemble in a TV Series ===
★ The Bill Engvall Show - TBS

Skyler Gisondo, Graham Patrick Martin and Jennifer Lawrence

- Cory in the House - Disney Channel

Jason Dolley, Kyle Massey, Madison Pettis and Jake Thomas

- iCarly - Nickelodeon

Miranda Cosgrove, Nathan Kress, Jennette McCurdy and Noah Munck

- One Life to Live - ABC

Eddie Alderson, Kristen Alderson, Camila Banus, Carmen LoPorto and Austin Williams

== Best Performance in a Voice-Over Role ==
=== Best Performance in a Voice-Over Role - Young Actor ===
★ David Gore - Fly Me to the Moon - Summit Entertainment

- Zachary Bloch - Super Why! (episode: "The Little Mermaid") - PBS
- Alexander Conti - Di-Gata Defenders - Luxanimation
- Alex Ferris - Martha Speaks - PBS
- Colin Ford - Christmas Is Here Again - MyNetwork TV
- Zachary Gordon - Madagascar: Escape 2 Africa - DreamWorks Animation/Paramount Pictures
- Thomas Stanley - Madagascar: Escape 2 Africa - DreamWorks Animation/Paramount Pictures

=== Best Performance in a Voice-Over Role - Young Actress ===
★ Emily Hirst - The Girl Who Leapt Through Time (English version) - Bandai Entertainment

- Shelby Adamowsky - Horton Hears a Who! - 20th Century Fox
- Selena Gomez - Horton Hears a Who! - 20th Century Fox
- Joey King - Horton Hears a Who! - 20th Century Fox
- Ashley McGullam - Return to Sender - Heavy B Productions
- Chloë Grace Moretz - My Friends Tigger & Pooh - Walt Disney Television

== Best Performance in a DVD Film ==
=== Best Performance in a DVD Film ===
★ Billy Unger - Cop Dog - Marvista Entertainment

- Jack Knight - A Lobster Tale - Peace Arch Entertainment
- Matthew Knight - Christmas in Wonderland - Yari Film Group
- Gig Morton - Snow Buddies - Walt Disney Studios Home Entertainment
- Stefanie Scott - Beethoven's Big Break - Universal Studios

== Best Performance in Live Theater ==
=== Best Performance in Live Theater / Host ===
★ Shemar Charles - Pop It! - Hop To It Productions

- Emily Albrecht - Ruthless! The Musical - Simi Valley Cultural Arts Center
- Logan O'Brien - Digital Video Editing & Video Camera Techniques - The Young Filmmakers Club

== Special awards ==
=== Outstanding Live Family Act ===
★ "The Kalinins" – Misha and Ivan Kalinin (Father and Son) – Acrobats

=== Outstanding International Feature Film Ensemble ===
★ Slumdog Millionaire (India)

Ayush Mahesh Khedekar, Azharuddin Mohammed Ismail, Rubina Ali, Tanay Chheda, Ashutosh Lobo Gajiwala, Tanvi Ganesh Lonkar, Farzana Ansari, Chirag Parmar and Siddesh Patil

=== Outstanding Broadway Musical Ensemble ===
★ Billy Elliot the Musical

David Álvarez, Trent Kowalik, Kiril Kulish, David Bologna, Frank Dolce and Erin Whyland

=== Jackie Coogan Award ===
==== Contribution to Youth ====
★ Kenny Ortega, Producer / Director / Choreographer – High School Musical

=== Michael Landon Award ===
==== Contribution to Youth ====
★ Gary Sinise, Actor / Humanitarian – Co-founder: Operation Iraqi Children

=== Social Relations of Knowledge Institute Award ===
★ Brink - The Science Channel

=== Outstanding Contribution to Family Entertainment ===
★ Bolt
★ Captain Abu Raed
★ The Lucky Ones
★ Mamma Mia!
★ WALL-E
