= List of Tony Award records =

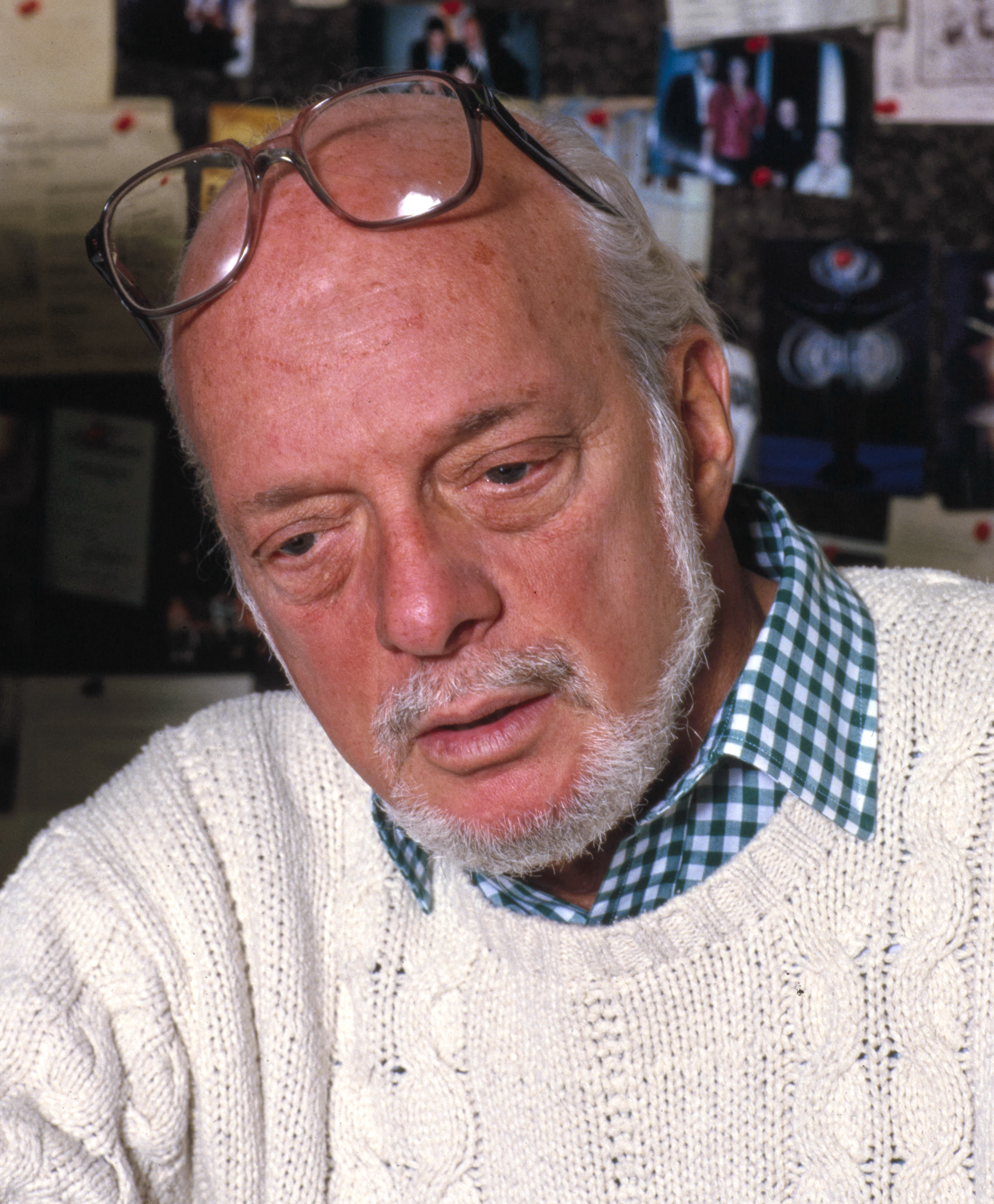
Harold Prince held the record as the most wins and nominations for a Tony.

This list of Tony Award records are current as of 79th Tony Awards, with that ceremony taking place on June 7, 2026.

Some notable records and facts about the Tony Awards include the following:

== Most numbers ==
=== Nominations ===
- The most Tony nominations ever received by a single production was Hamilton (2016) with 16 nominations in 13 categories.
  - It narrowly passed the previous holders, The Producers (2001; 15 nominations in 12 categories) and Billy Elliot (2009; 15 nominations in 13 categories). The most nominations for a play was Stereophonic (2024; 13 nominations in 10 categories).
  - Musicals The Scottsboro Boys (2011) and Mean Girls (2018), as well as non-musical play Slave Play (2020) are tied: all three were nominated for 12 Tony Awards but did not win any.

=== Winners ===
- The most awards ever received by a single production was The Producers (2001) with 12 awards, including Best Musical.
  - The most Tonys ever received by a play was The Coast of Utopia (2007) with 7 awards, including Best Play.
- Acting awards: Only one production, South Pacific (1950 awards), has won all four of the acting awards in a single year.

== Major categories ==
=== Big Six of Musical ===
Four musicals have won all "big six" awards (consisting of Best Musical, Best Score, Best Book, Best Performance by a Leading Actor, Best Performance by a Leading Actress, and Best Direction awards) for original and adapted musicals:

- South Pacific (1950 awards)
- Sweeney Todd: The Demon Barber of Fleet Street (1979 awards)
- Hairspray (2003 awards)
- The Band's Visit (2018 awards)

=== Big Four of Play ===
Two plays have won all "big four" awards (consisting of Best Play, Best Performance by a Leading Actor, Best Performance by a Leading Actress, and Best Direction awards) for original and adapted plays:

- Who's Afraid of Virginia Woolf? (1963 awards)
- The Real Thing (1984 awards)

== Productions ==
- Words and Music: Only nine musicals have won the Tony Award for Best Musical when a person had (co-)written the Book (non-sung dialogue and storyline) and the Score (music and lyrics): 1958 winner The Music Man (Meredith Willson – awards for Book and Score did not exist that year), 1986 winner The Mystery of Edwin Drood (Rupert Holmes – who also won for Book and Score), 1996 winner Rent (Jonathan Larson posthumously – who also won for Book and Score), 2001 winner The Producers (Mel Brooks – also won for Book and Score), 2005 winner Spamalot (Eric Idle – the only one who failed to win for Book or Score in a year where these awards existed), 2011 winner The Book of Mormon (Trey Parker, Robert Lopez, and Matt Stone also won for Book and Score), 2016 winner Hamilton (Lin-Manuel Miranda also won for Book and Score), 2019 winner Hadestown (Anaïs Mitchell also won for Score), and 2022 winner A Strange Loop (Michael R. Jackson also won for Book).
- Design Awards: Eleven shows have swept the Design Awards (original 3 of Best Scenic Design, Best Costume Design, Best Lighting Design – joined by Best Sound Design starting in 2008): Follies (1972), The Phantom of the Opera (1986), The Lion King (1998), The Producers (2001), The Light in the Piazza (2005), The Coast of Utopia (2007), the 2008 revival of South Pacific (first to sweep the expanded four awards for Creative Arts), Peter and the Starcatcher (first straight play to sweep the expanded four awards for Creative Arts) (2012), Harry Potter and the Cursed Child (2018), A Christmas Carol and Moulin Rouge! (both 2020).
- Revivals: Death of a Salesman by Arthur Miller in 2026 became the first show (play or musical) to win as Best Production in five different years: Best Play at the 1949 awards, Best Revival at the 1984 awards (before the Best Revival award was split into two categories for Play and Musical in 1994), and Best Revival of a Play at the 1999, 2012, and 2026 awards. La Cage aux Folles made history as the first musical to win as Best Production in three different years, Best Musical at the 1984 awards and Best Revival of a Musical at both the 2005 awards and the 2010 awards. The King and I has also garnered three Tony Awards, one for each time it has been produced on Broadway, first as Best Musical and then twice as Best Revival of a Musical. Company has also won three Tony Awards, first as Best Musical in 1971, followed by Best Revival of a Musical in 2007 and 2022.

== Individuals ==
- Most wins: Harold Prince won a record 21 Tony Awards, more than any other individual, including eight for Best Direction of a Musical, eight for Best Musical, two for Best Producer of a Musical, and three Special Tony Awards. Tommy Tune has ten Tony Awards including three for direction, four for choreography, two for performing, and one special Tony Award. Stephen Sondheim holds the record for most Tony wins of any composer, with five awards for Best Original Score, one each for Best Composer and Best Lyricist (for Company, before the two categories were combined as Best Original Score) and one special Tony Award. Bob Fosse won the most Tonys for Best Choreography, with eight. Oliver Smith won a record eight Tony Awards for his scenic designs. Jules Fisher has the most awards for lighting design, with nine. Audra McDonald holds the record for most Tony wins for acting, with six. Tom Stoppard has the most Tony wins for a playwright with five, followed by Terrence McNally with four. Stoppard has five for Best Play, while McNally has two for Best Play and two for Best Book of a Musical.
- Most nominations: Audra McDonald holds the record for most nominations of any performer, with 11.
- Performers in two categories: Six performers have been nominated in two acting categories in the same year: Amanda Plummer, Dana Ivey, Kate Burton, Jan Maxwell, Mark Rylance, and Jeremy Pope. Plummer in 1982 was nominated for Best Actress in a Play for A Taste of Honey and Best Featured Actress in a Play for Agnes of God, for which she won. Ivey in 1984 was nominated as Best Featured Actress in Musical for Sunday in the Park with George and Best Featured Actress in a Play for Heartbreak House. In 2002, Burton was nominated for Best Actress in Play for Hedda Gabler and Best Featured Actress in a Play for The Elephant Man. Maxwell was nominated in 2010 for Best Actress in a Play for The Royal Family and Best Featured Actress in a Play for Lend Me a Tenor. Rylance was nominated in 2014 for Best Actor in a Play for Richard III and Best Featured Actor in a Play for Twelfth Night, for which he won. Pope was nominated in 2019 for Best Actor in a Play for Choir Boy and Best Featured Actor in a Musical for Ain't Too Proud.
- Performers with nominations in all four acting categories: Five performers have been nominated in all four acting categories for which they are eligible.
  - Boyd Gaines was the first performer to be nominated in all four categories: Best Featured Actor in a Play for The Heidi Chronicles (1989), Best Actor in a Musical for She Loves Me (1994), Best Featured Actor in a Musical for both Contact (2000) and Gypsy (2008), and Best Actor in a Play for Journey's End (2007). He won in three of the categories (and four of the five nominations), missing only for the performance in Journey's End.
  - Raúl Esparza was the second performer to be nominated in all four categories (no wins), achieving this over a mere six seasons: Best Featured Actor in a Musical for Taboo (2004), Best Actor in a Musical for Company (2007), Best Featured Actor in a Play for The Homecoming (2008), and Best Actor in a Play for Speed-the-Plow (2009).
  - Angela Lansbury was the third performer to be nominated in all four acting categories. She won Best Actress in a Musical for Mame (1966), Dear World (1969), Gypsy (1975), and Sweeney Todd (1979). She was nominated for Best Actress in a Play for Deuce (2007) and Best Featured Actress in a Musical for A Little Night Music (2010). She won Best Featured Actress in a Play for Blithe Spirit (2009).
  - Jan Maxwell became the fourth performer to achieve this distinction with nominations (no wins) for Best Featured Actress in a Musical for Chitty Chitty Bang Bang (2005), Best Featured Actress in a Play for Coram Boy (2007) and Lend Me a Tenor (2010), Best Actress in a Play for The Royal Family (2010), and Best Actress in a Musical for Follies (2012).
  - Audra McDonald became the fifth performer to accomplish the feat and the first to win in all four categories, winning two for Best Featured Actress in a Musical for Carousel (1994) and Ragtime (1998); two for Best Featured Actress in a Play for Master Class (1996) and A Raisin in the Sun (2004); one for Best Actress in a Musical for Porgy and Bess (2012), and one for Best Actress in a Play for Lady Day at Emerson's Bar and Grill (2014). She was also nominated for Best Actress in a Musical for Marie Christine (2000), 110 in the Shade (2007), and Gypsy (2025), and for Best Actress in a Play for Frankie and Johnny in the Clair de Lune (2020/21) and Ohio State Murders (2022).
- Performers Playing Opposite Sex: While several performers have won Tonys for roles that have involved cross-dressing, only six have won for playing a character of the opposite sex (this does not include non-binary performers, trans performers, or trans characters): Mary Martin in the title role of Peter Pan (1955), Harvey Fierstein as Edna Turnblad in Hairspray (2003), Mark Rylance as Olivia in Twelfth Night (2014), Lena Hall as Yitzhak in Hedwig and the Angry Inch (2014), Sarah Snook as Dorian Gray in The Picture of Dorian Gray (2025), and Jak Malone as Hester Leggatt in Operation Mincemeat (2025). In 2000, Australian actor Barry Humphries won the Special Tony Award for a live theatrical event at the 55th Annual Tony Awards for Dame Edna: The Royal Tour.
- Shared Performances: the three young actors who shared the duties of performing the title role in Billy Elliot the Musical (2009 awards) – David Alvarez, Trent Kowalik and Kiril Kulish – shared a single nomination and win, for Best Actor in a Musical. Previously, the only prior joint winners were John Kani and Winston Ntshona, who shared the Best Actor in a Play award in 1975 for Sizwe Banzi is Dead and The Island, two plays they co-wrote and co-starred in. In 2003, the 10 stars of Baz Luhrmann's La Bohème won a joint Tony Honors for Excellence in Theatre award, as did the four co-leads in the title role of Matilda the Musical in 2013.
- Two genders, one role: Ben Vereen (Best Actor in a Musical, 1972) and Patina Miller (Best Actress in a Musical, 2013) both won for the role of the Leading Player in Pippin, marking the first time the same role has garnered Tony Awards for both a man and a woman in a Broadway production.
- Writing and performing: Two people have won Tonys as both an author and as a performer. Harvey Fierstein won Best Play and Best Lead Actor in a Play for Torch Song Trilogy (1983), Best Book of a Musical for La Cage aux Folles, and Best Lead Actor in a Musical for Hairspray. Tracy Letts won Best Play for August: Osage County (2008) and Best Lead Actor in a Play for Who's Afraid of Virginia Woolf? (2013).
- Youngest and oldest winners of Best Score or Best Book: Toby Marlow is the youngest person to win Best Score; they were 27 when they won in tandem with Lucy Moss for Six. Adolph Green is the oldest person to win the award; he was 76 when he won for The Will Rogers Follies. If T. S. Eliot had been alive when he won for Cats, he would have been 94. Eliot is also one of two people to win the award posthumously, the other being Jonathan Larson, who won for Rent. He would have been 36.
- Youngest and oldest actors to win: John Lithgow is the oldest actor to win a Tony, for Giant (at age 80), and Lois Smith for oldest actress for The Inheritance (at age 90). The youngest actor to win a Tony Award, at age 11, was Frankie Michaels, for his featured role in Mame (1966) a record which still stands today. 25 years later, at 11 1/2 years old, Daisy Eagan took home a Tony Award for Best Featured Actress in a Musical for The Secret Garden, cementing her place in Tony history as the youngest woman to win the award.
- Youngest and oldest winners for Tony Award for Best Actress in a Musical: Liza Minnelli is the youngest to win the award, for Flora the Red Menace (at age 19). Bette Midler is the oldest actress to win the award, for Hello, Dolly! (at age 71).
- In 2013, the four girls who alternated in the title role in Matilda the Musical (Sophia Gennusa, aged 9; Bailey Ryon, aged 10; Oona Laurence, aged 10; and Milly Shapiro, aged 10) shared an honorary Tony Award, making Gennusa the youngest to ever receive a Tony, albeit a non-competitive one.

== Firsts ==
- First African-American to win Tony Award for Best Featured Actress in a Musical: Juanita Hall for South Pacific in 1950.
- First African-American to win Tony Award for Best Featured Actor in a Musical: Harry Belafonte for John Murray Anderson's Almanac in 1954.
- First female author to win Best Play: Frances Goodrich with her partner (and husband) Albert Hackett for The Diary of Anne Frank in 1956.
- First African-American to win Tony Award for Best Actress in a Musical: Diahann Carroll for No Strings in 1962.
- First African-American to win Tony Award for Best Actor in a Play: James Earl Jones for The Great White Hope in 1969.
- First African-American to win Tony Award for Best Actor in a Musical: Cleavon Little for Purlie in 1970.
- First African-American author to win Tony Award for Best Play: Joseph A. Walker for The River Niger in 1974.
- First African-American composer to solely win Tony Award for Best Score: Charlie Smalls for The Wiz in 1975.
- First female to win Tony Award for Best Score: Betty Comden for On the Twentieth Century in 1978. (In 1968, she became the first female to win the previous version of the Best Score Award, the Tony Award for Best Composer And Lyricist for Hallelujah, Baby!)
- First Asian-American author to win Best Play: David Henry Hwang for M Butterfly in 1988.
- First Asian-American to win Best Featured Actor in a Play: BD Wong for M Butterfly in 1988.
- First female author to solely win Best Play: Wendy Wasserstein for The Heidi Chronicles in 1989.
- First Asian to win Tony Award for Best Actress in a Musical: Lea Salonga for Miss Saigon in 1991.
- First woman to win Best Direction of a Musical: Julie Taymor for The Lion King in 1998.
- First woman to win Best Direction of a Play: Garry Hynes for The Beauty Queen of Leenane in 1998.
- First African-American to win Tony Award for Best Actress in a Play: Phylicia Rashad for A Raisin in the Sun in 2004.
- First Brazilian to win Tony Award for Best Actor in a Musical: Paulo Szot for South Pacific in 2008.
- First woman to solely win Tony Award for Best Score: Cyndi Lauper for Kinky Boots in 2013.
- First Asian-American to win Tony Award for Best Featured Actress in a Musical: Ruthie Ann Miles for The King and I in 2015.
- First female team to win Tony Award for Best Score and Tony Award for Best Book: Jeanine Tesori & Lisa Kron for Fun Home in 2015.
- First Lebanese-American to win Tony Award for Best Actor in a Musical: Tony Shalhoub for The Band's Visit in 2018.
- First Yemeni-American to win Tony Award for Best Featured Actor in a Musical: Ari'el Stachel for The Band's Visit in 2018.
- First person who uses a wheelchair to be nominated for and to receive a Tony Award for acting: Ali Stroker with the Tony Award for Best Featured Actress in a Musical for Oklahoma! in 2019.
- First woman to be nominated for and to win Best Sound Design of a Musical: Jessica Paz for Hadestown in 2019.
- First Latino playwright to win Tony Award for Best Play: Matthew López for The Inheritance in 2020.
- First openly trans performer to be nominated for a Tony Award: L Morgan Lee with the Tony Award for Best Featured Actress in a Musical for A Strange Loop in 2022.
- First openly non binary performers to be nominated for and win a Tony Award: J. Harrison Ghee and Alex Newell, for Tony Award for Best Actor in a Musical and Tony Award for Best Performance by a Featured Actor in a Musical, respectively, in 2023.
- First African-American to win Tony Award for Best Costume Design in a Play: Dede Atiye, for Jaja's African Hair Braiding in 2024.
- First woman to solely win both Tony Award for Best Book of a Musical and Tony Award for Best Original Score: Shaina Taub, for Suffs in 2024.
- First actress to be nominated for Tony Award for Best Featured Actress in a Play in four consecutive years: Kara Young (2022, 2023, 2024, 2025).
- First African-American actress to win consecutive Tony Awards for Best Featured Actress in a Play: Kara Young (2024 and 2025).
- First Asian-American actor to win Tony Award for Best Leading Actor in a Musical: Darren Criss for Maybe Happy Ending (2025)
- First openly trans woman to win a Tony Award: Qween Jean for Cats: The Jellicle Ball

== See also ==
- African-American Tony nominees and winners
- EGOT
- List of Tony Award-nominated productions
- List of Academy Award records
- List of Grammy Award records
- List of Primetime Emmy Award records
