= Alex Ko =

American actor (born 1996)

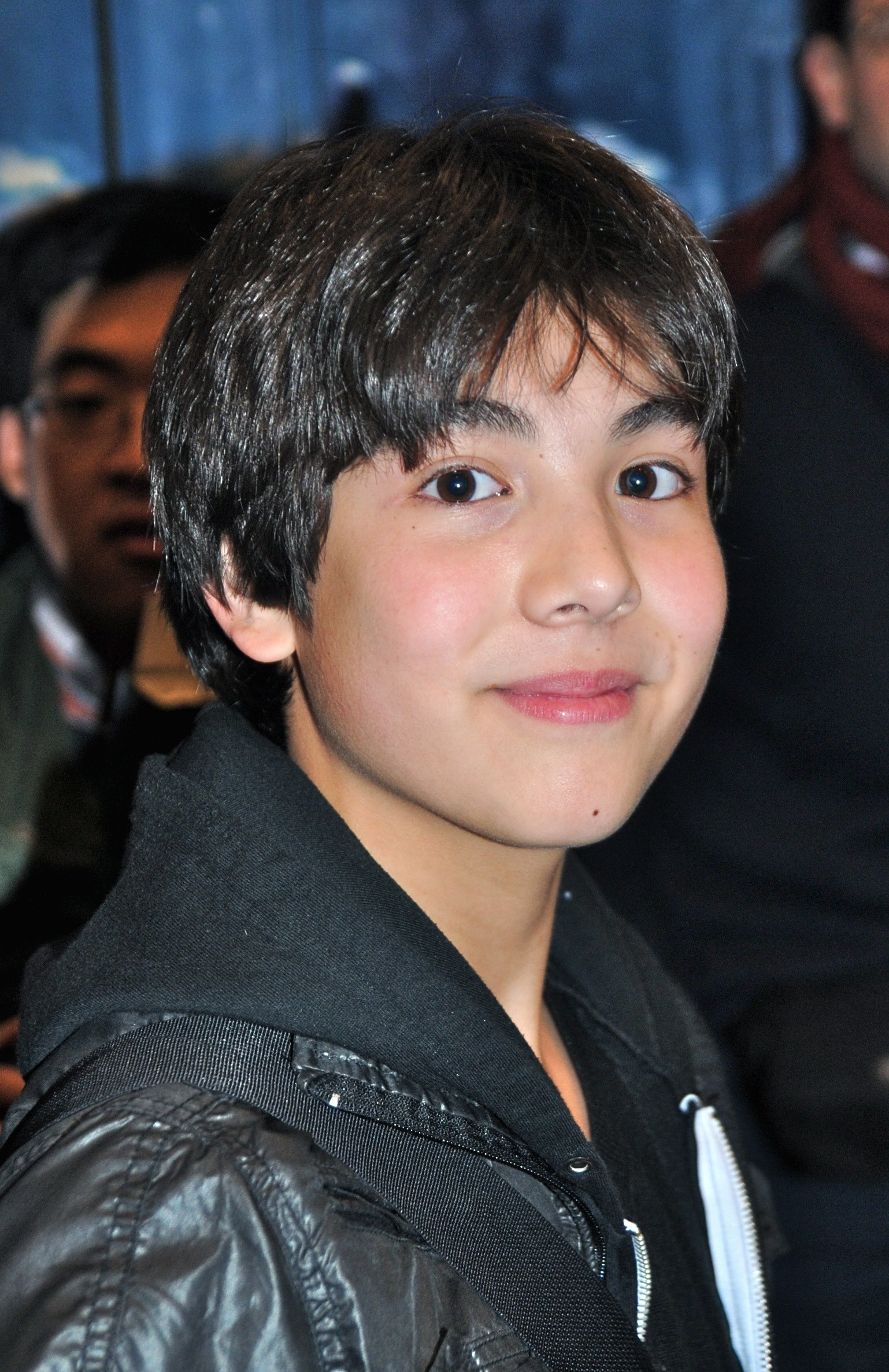
- Alex Ko (at age 14)
- Born: February 3, 1996 (age 30); Iowa City, Iowa, U.S.
- Occupations: Film director, film screenwriter, actor
- Years active: 2009–present

Nicholas Alexander Ko (born February 3, 1996) is an American actor, film director and screenwriter. He won the title role in Billy Elliot the Musical on Broadway in 2009.

== Early life and education ==
Ko is the middle child of three children. He was born and raised in Iowa City, Iowa. Ko's father, Cheukman Sam Ko, was born in Hong Kong where he was working professionally including projects: Shanghai Surprise and The Protector (1985 film). Ko's father became an entrepreneur after relocating to the United States in 1992 and died of cancer when Alex was 11 years old. His mother, Tammie Cumming, was born in Pittsburgh, Pennsylvania, and raised in DeLand, Florida. After attending elementary school at the age of 12, Ko was accepted to The University of Iowa in Iowa City under Iowa's Talented and Gifted law and dual-enrolled in the Iowa City Home School Assistance Program.

Ko continued his dance education at the Jacqueline Kennedy Onassis School (ballet) – Pre-Professional Division of the American Ballet Theatre.

Ko attended high school at the Professional Children's School in New York City and went on to study and graduated with honors from the American University of Paris.

At the age of 13, Ko and his family relocated to New York City to perform the title role of Billy in "Billy Elliot the Musical" on Broadway. Ko said that his household is influenced heavily by the Chinese culture.

Ko won National and Regional Dance and Gymnastics Championship titles since the age of 5-years old. He was the youngest student admitted to The University of Iowa Department of Dance, where he earned college credit and a 4.0 grade-point-average. He was also awarded full scholarships to Steps on Broadway and the Joffrey Ballet School in New York City.

== Career ==
=== Broadway ===
Ko played the title role in the Broadway musical, Billy Elliot the Musical, as the first replacement Billy for Kiril Kulish. Ko was discovered when taking classes for one week at Steps on Broadway during the summer of 2008. He relocated in 2009 to New York City from Iowa with his family. Alex made his Broadway debut on 6 October 2009 and made his final performance as Billy on 15 May 2011.

=== Television ===
Ko made a cameo appearance at Sugarland's televised broadcast of their Unstaged concert held in NYC in October 2010. He went on to make his national television debut in November 2010 (NBC) and February 2011(Hallmark Channel), when he appeared as a guest artist on NBC's production of Shall We Dance On Ice? with a solo performance and a duet with Broadway performer, Cody Green.

Ko also appeared in a guest role on ABC Family's Bunheads in June 2012 directed by Kenny Ortega.

=== Autobiography ===
Upon leaving his role as "Billy" in Billy Elliot the Musical, Ko announced he was represented by literary agent, Charlotte Sheedy, and secured a contract with HarperCollins to publish a book about his life's journey to Broadway. His autobiography, Alex Ko: From Iowa to Broadway, My Billy Elliot Story, was published on 30 April 2013. The book trailer, published by HarperCollins, was produced and directed by Stephen Daldry.

=== Filmography ===
After moving to Paris at the age of 18, Ko went on to direct, produce, and write short films, including Ça va 2016 and The Duck in 2018. The Duck premiered at the Arizona International Film Festival in 2019 and was also featured at the Motovun Film Festival in July 2019.

== Awards and honors ==
On 17 June 2010, Ko received the Broadway Beacon award for his performance in the title role of "Billy", along with the four other boys, Jacob Clemente, Michael Dameski, Liam Redhead and Dayton Tavares, who were rotating in the role in Billy Elliot the Musical on Broadway.

Ko was an honoured guest at a reception held by President Barack Obama at The White House on 28 May 2013 held to honor the contribution of Asian Americans in the arts.

Alex Ko's short film, The Yellow Dress, won the 2020 Austin Film Festival (AFF) Narrative Short Audience Award.
