= Snide =

Snide may refer to:

- Snide, a village in Gârda de Sus Commune, Alba County, Romania
- Corey Snide (born 1993), an American actor
- Snide the Weasel, a non-playable character in the video game Donkey Kong 64
