= Billy Elliot the Musical =

2005 stage musical by Elton John and Lee Hall

Billy Elliot
- The Musical
- West End promotional poster
- Music: Elton John
- Lyrics: Lee Hall
- Book: Lee Hall
- Basis: Film Billy Elliot by Lee Hall
- Premiere: 31 March 2005: Victoria Palace Theatre, London
- Productions: 2005 West End; 2008 Broadway; 2010 North America tour 2010 US tour 2011 North America tour 2016 UK tour 2026 UK tour 2027 West End
- Awards: Laurence Olivier Award for Best New Musical; Tony Award for Best Musical; Tony Award for Best Book of a Musical; Drama Desk Award for Outstanding Musical; Drama Desk Award for Outstanding Book of a Musical; Drama Desk Award for Outstanding Music

Billy Elliot is a coming-of-age stage musical based on the 2000 film of the same name. The music is by Elton John, and the book and lyrics are by Lee Hall, who wrote the film's screenplay. The plot revolves around Billy Elliot, a motherless British boy who begins taking ballet lessons. The story of his personal struggle and fulfillment is balanced against a counter-story of family and community strife caused by the 1984–1985 miners' strike in County Durham, in North East England. Hall's screenplay was inspired in part by A. J. Cronin's 1935 novel about a miners' strike, The Stars Look Down, to which the musical's opening song pays homage.

The musical premiered at the Victoria Palace Theatre in London's West End in 2005 and ran through April 2016. The production was nominated for nine Laurence Olivier Awards and won four, including Best New Musical. Its success led to productions—on Broadway, in Australia, and in numerous other countries. The New York production won ten Tony Awards and ten Drama Desk Awards, including, in each case, Best Musical. The production in Australia also won numerous awards, including a record-tying seven Helpmann Awards.

A live recording of the musical was released on DVD and Blu-ray in the UK on 24 November 2014.

== Productions ==
=== Original London production ===
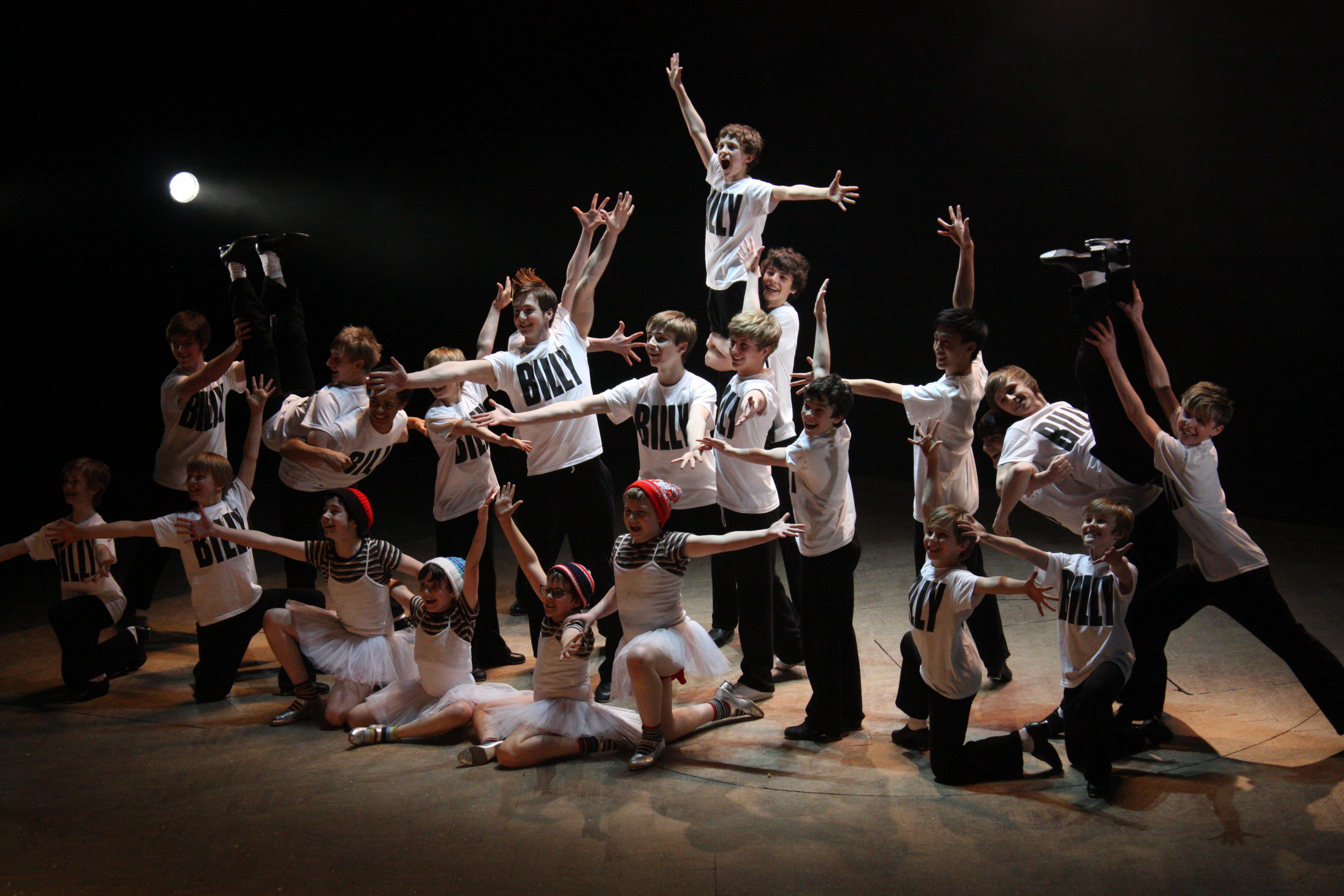
Five years of West End Billys performing in the 5th Birthday Show at the Victoria Palace Theatre on 31 March 2010

The premiere of the musical was planned at the Tyne Theatre in Newcastle upon Tyne, England, but this was abandoned due to financial problems of the Tyne Theatre's operator, and the production's growing budget.

The musical premiered in the West End at the Victoria Palace Theatre, opening in previews on 31 March 2005 and officially on 11 May 2005. It closed on 9 April 2016, when the theatre closed for refurbishment, after 4,600 performances. The show reportedly cost £5.5 million to produce (the original film version cost $5 million). The producers were Working Title Films, Old Vic Productions Plc and David Furnish. It was directed by Stephen Daldry and choreographed by Peter Darling, as was the original film. Liam Mower, James Lomas and George Maguire were the original actors who alternated in the title role, and the supporting cast included Haydn Gwynne as Mrs. Wilkinson, Tim Healy as Billy's father, and Stephanie Putson as Billy's mother. The sets were designed by Ian MacNeil, the costumes by Nicky Gillibrand, lighting was by Rick Fisher, and sound by Paul Arditti.

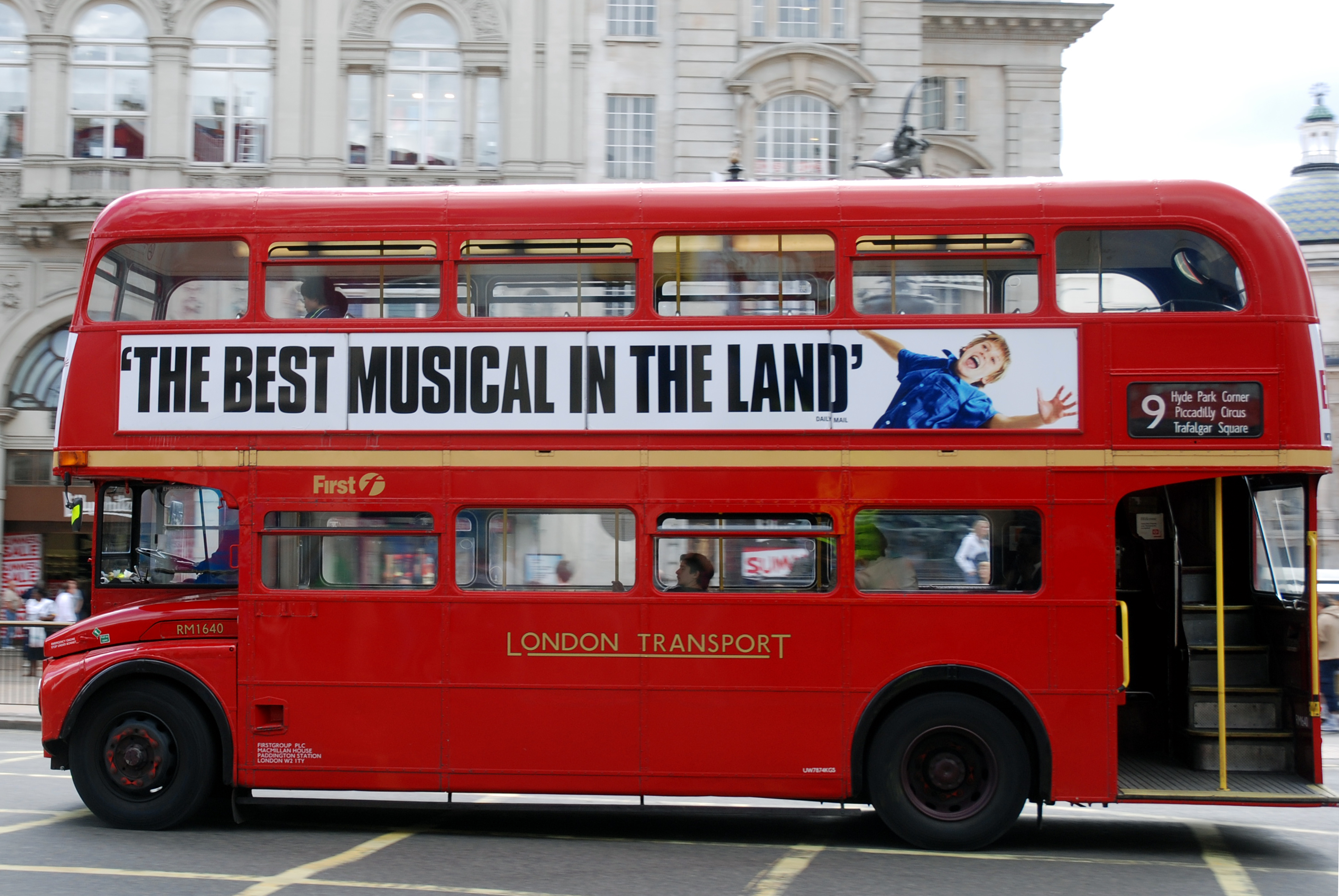
Billy Elliot advertisement on a Routemaster bus in London, 2007

The musical received favourable reviews: The Daily Telegraph's Charles Spencer called it "the greatest British musical I have ever seen". It won four Laurence Olivier Awards in 2006: Best New Musical, Best Actor in a Leading Role in a Musical (awarded jointly to James Lomas, George Maguire and Liam Mower, the boys who played Billy), Best Theatre Choreographer and Best Sound Design. It also won the Evening Standard Theatre Award, the Critics' Circle Theatre Award, and the Theatregoers' Choice Award, all for Best Musical.

The original cast album was released on 10 January 2006. On 12 May 2006, the three original Billys appeared together in a performance of the musical to celebrate its first anniversary. The three rotated the role during the performance and were joined at the end by Elton John. At the 2013 Laurence Olivier Awards, the show won another Olivier Award, the BBC Radio 2 Audience Award for Most Popular Show (voted for by theatre goers), after many years of being finalists for the award. After Margaret Thatcher died in 2013, according to director Stephen Daldry, the audience were given the choice to decide whether the song "Merry Christmas, Maggie Thatcher" would be included in the performance that day, since the lyrics include the sentence: "We all celebrate today 'cause it's one day closer to your death". As only three audience members voted against it, the performance went ahead as usual. On 3 July 2015, 12-year-old Nat Sweeney from Birmingham became the 41st actor to play the role of Billy in London, making him the 100th to play the role worldwide. Elton John appeared on stage at the final West End performance in April 2016.

==== Billy Elliot the Musical Live ====
In June 2014, it was announced that the musical would be screened and broadcast live to cinemas around the UK and the world. On 28 September, the matinee of the musical was broadcast as it was being filmed at the Victoria Palace Theatre to cinemas around the UK and other countries, with further encore screenings of that same performance on other dates. Billy was played by Elliott Hanna. Liam Mower, one of the three actors who originated the title role, returned to play the role of Older Billy. In addition, 25 past and present actors to have played the title role on the West End performed a specially-choreographed dance number at the finale. The live broadcast topped the UK and Ireland box office the weekend it was broadcast, a first for an event cinema release, beating The Equalizer with £1.9m. This performance was released on DVD and Blu-ray on 24 November 2014 in the United Kingdom. This cast includes Elliott Hanna in the title role with Ruthie Henshall as Mrs. Wilkinson, Deka Walmsley as Billy's dad, Chris Grahamson as Tony and Ann Emery as Grandma. Further cast included Claudia Bradley as Dead Mam, Howard Crossley as George, David Muscatt as Mr. Braithwaite, Alan Mehdizadeh as Big Davey, Liam Mower as Older Billy and David Stoller as Posh Dad.

==== Billy Youth Theatre ====
Billy Youth Theatre was a countrywide scheme as part of which participating schools and youth groups were given the opportunity to stage their own production of the musical. Billy Elliot writer Lee Hall, together with Martin Koch (musical supervision and orchestrations), adapted their original script and orchestrations to produce a shortened version of the show exclusively for groups staging local productions as part of Billy Youth Theatre.

=== Australian tours ===
==== Original Australian tour ====
The musical opened at Sydney's Capitol Theatre on 13 November 2007, directed by Daldry in association with Julian Webber, and choreographed by Darling. Rhys Kosakowski, Lochlan Denholm, Rarmian Newton, and Nick Twiney alternated in the title role. The production earned good notices, and in January 2008 it won Best Musical at the 2008 Sydney Theatre Awards. The show also won seven Helpmann Awards, including the awards for Best Musical, Best Direction, Best Choreography, Best Female Actor (Genevieve Lemon as Mrs. Wilkinson) and Best Male Actor, awarded jointly to the four boys who played Billy Elliot at the 8th Helpmann Awards. The production concluded in Sydney on 9 November 2008 with all eight Sydney Billys in the finale.

The Sydney production transferred to Melbourne's Her Majesty's Theatre, opening on 13 December 2008. The Melbourne production closed on 14 June 2009 after a successful run.

==== 10th anniversary Australian tour (2019) ====
On 10 April 2017 it was announced that Billy Elliot would open at Sydney's Lyric Theatre in October 2019. The production transferred to Adelaide, followed by Melbourne where it was scheduled to close in April 2020. The adult cast featured Kelley Abbey as Mrs. Wilkinson, Justin Smith as Billy's dad, Vivien Davis as Grandma and Drew Livingston as Troy. Mid-way through the run, Abbey withdrew from the show and was replaced by her understudy Lisa Sontag as Mrs. Wilkinson. On 28 November, Elton John watched the show from a private box and surprised the cast and audience by participating in the final bows. The show closed just over a month early in Melbourne, on 16 March 2020, due to audience restrictions due to the COVID-19 pandemic.

=== Original Broadway production ===
The Broadway production opened at the Imperial Theatre on 1 October 2008 in previews, and officially on 13 November 2008. The London production's creative team directed and designed the Broadway production. The title role was rotated among three young actors, David Alvarez, Kiril Kulish, Trent Kowalik, the last of whom had previously played the role in London. The supporting cast included Haydn Gwynne, reprising her role of Mrs. Wilkinson from the London production, and Gregory Jbara as Billy's father.

The production received rave reviews: Time called it a "triumph"; critic Liz Smith termed it "breathtakingly brilliant" and "absolutely, unequivocally awesome"; the Daily News said it was "so exhilarating that at times you feel like leaping"; the New York Post said it was "almost like being in love" and termed it "amusing, perfect and passionate" and "the best show you will ever see"; and the Los Angeles Times called it a "global theatrical phenomenon". It has also been very financially successful, with $20 million taken in advance ticket sales. In 2009, the production received fifteen Tony Award nominations, tying with The Producers for the most nominations ever received by a Broadway show, and winning ten at the 63rd Tony Awards, including Best Musical. The original three boys in the lead role, Alvarez, Kulish and Kowalik, jointly won a Tony Award for Best Actor in a Leading Role in a Musical. The production sold strongly and recouped its original investment of $18 million in 14 months. The Broadway production closed on 8 January 2012 following 40 previews and 1,312 regular performances.

=== Original Mexican production ===
The first Spanish language production opened on 14 February 2017 at Centro Cultural Teatro 2 in Mexico City. The role of Billy was played by Mauricio Arriaga, Demián Ferráez, Ian González and Aaron Márquez. The role of Mrs. Wilkinson was played by Anahí Allué. The cast also included Hernán Mendoza, Carlos Fonseca, first actress Norma Lazareno and Concepción Márquez as Billy's father, Tony and Billy's grandmother respectively. Tony Award winner David Alvarez, from the original Broadway production, reprised his character in its adult version for this production. Billy Elliot closed on 30 December 2017 and from January through August 2018 it embarked on a national tour.

=== Original Spanish production ===
The second Spanish language production began previews on 22 September 2017 at the Nuevo Teatro Alcalá in Madrid, and officially opened on 5 October 2017. The role of Billy was originally played by Pablo Bravo, Pau Gimeno, Cristian López, Miguel Millán, Oscar Pérez, and Diego Rey, with Carlos Hipólito as Billy's father and Natalia Millán as Mrs. Wilkinson.

Billy Elliot closed in Madrid on 10 March 2020, when performances were suspended due to the COVID-19 pandemic. The production reopened on 9 October 2021 at the Teatre Victòria in Barcelona, where it ran until 22 May 2022. With 1,166 performances played, this is the 3rd longest running production of Billy Elliot worldwide, only after London and Broadway.

=== Stratford Festival production ===
The Stratford Festival in Stratford, Ontario announced that Billy Elliot would be part of its 2019 season. Previews began on 16 April 2019, and the official opening performance was held on 28 May. The production was scheduled to run until 3 November, but was extended due to popular demand until 24 November. There were a total of 119 performances throughout the season.

The production was staged in the Festival Theatre, making this the first time the show has been performed on a thrust stage. Because the audience would be seated on 3 sides of the stage, the blocking and staging needed to be designed so that all members of the audience could see the performance. The production was directed and choreographed by Donna Feore, with set design by Michael Gianfrancesco, costuming by Dana Osborne, and music direction by Franklin Brasz.

Nolen Dubuc was announced for the lead role of Billy. While there was an understudy, Dubuc ended up performing in all 119 performances. The rest of the cast included Emerson Gamble as Michael, Blythe Wilson as Mrs. Wilkinson, and Dan Chameroy as Dad.

=== Original German-language production ===
The first German-language production of Billy Elliot premiered in November 2024 at the Maag Music Hall in Zurich. The title role of Billy was played by Moritz Fischli (alternated with Leo Lemmerich, Nevio Reymond). The main cast also included Pasquale Aleardi as the father (alternating with Frank Logemann), Isabelle Flachsmann (alternating with Gabriela Ryffel) as Mrs. Wilkinson, Sabine Martin (alternating with Kaatje Dierks) as the grandmother and Justin Périer (alternating with Elias Meier, Charlie Bänziger) as Michael. Roman Riklin (lyrics) and Eric Hättenschwiler (dialogues) were responsible for the German-language adaptation.

=== North American touring productions ===
==== First North American tour ====
Although considered the first US tour, the show did not tour as a usual touring production would, with longer engagements in Chicago and Toronto.

===== Chicago (2010) =====
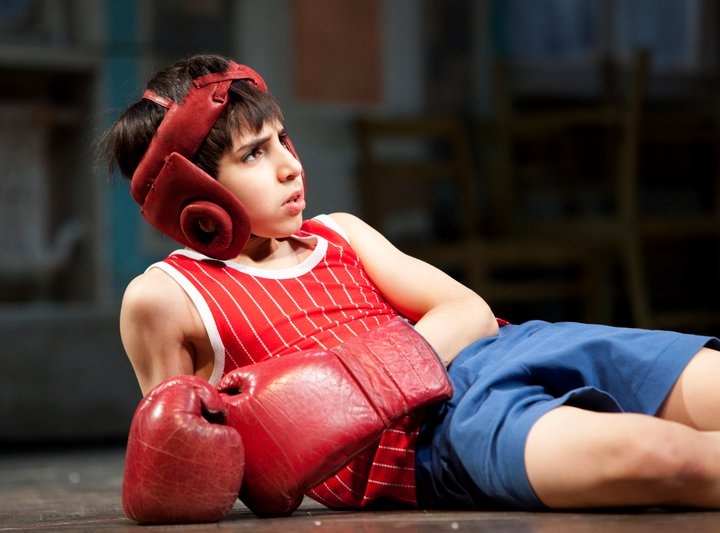
Cesar Corrales in a scene from the Chicago production.

The musical opened in Chicago on 18 March 2010 in previews, officially on 11 April, at the Ford Center for the Performing Arts Oriental Theatre for an extended run. This is the start of the North American multi-city tour. According to producer Eric Fellner, however, the musical "will be here until such time as Chicago says 'go away'. ... We can only do one production at once," and other North American cities will have to wait until the Chicago production runs its course. Emily Skinner played Mrs. Wilkinson, and the cast featured Tommy Batchelor, Giuseppe Bausilio, Cesar Corrales and J.P. Viernes alternating as Billy, with Armand Schultz as Billy's Dad, Cynthia Darlow as Grandma, Patrick Mulvey as Tony and Jim Ortlieb as George. The production closed early on 28 November 2010 and transferred to Toronto. The show ran for 37 weeks and 288 performances.

The production had been slated to run through July 2010 but was extended to the middle of January 2011, by popular demand. By September, however, ticket sales were growing bleak. According to the Chicago Tribune, "Weekday attendance had been especially poor in recent weeks, despite heavily discounted tickets. Audience members at the Oriental Theatre in the Loop had reported an almost-empty balcony at some shows, and weekday attendance had been as low as 900 or so people. December sales are typically strong, so the decision to close then indicated that things were not expected to pick up." The show closed "early" in November 2010.

===== Toronto (2011) =====
The Canadian premiere of the show opened on 1 February 2011 at the Canon Theatre in Toronto. The cast included: Kate Hennig as Mrs. Wilkinson; Cesar Corrales, J.P. Viernes, Marcus Pei and Myles Erlick as Billy; Armand Schultz as Billy's dad; Cynthia Darlow as Grandma; Patrick Mulvey as Tony; Jim Ortlieb as George; and cast members from the Chicago company. It was originally scheduled for 28 January 2011.

The show received mostly glowing reviews. The most critical review was one published in the National Post: "The signal achievement of Billy Elliot the Musical is to be even phonier than the movie it's based on." The show was extended, due to packed audiences for an additional three months.

==== Second US tour ====
A second tour opened at the Durham Performing Arts Center in Durham, North Carolina, on 30 October 2010. Although this is the first production of the musical to tour the United States in a "touring" manner, this is still considered to be the second national tour.

The title role was shared by Giuseppe Bausilio, Michael Dameski, Kylend Hetherington, Lex Ishimoto, and Daniel Patrick Russell. The cast also included Faith Prince as Mrs. Wilkinson, Rich Hebert as Billy's father, Griffin Birney and Jacob Zelonky alternating the role of Michael, Patti Perkins as Grandma, Jeff Kready as Tony, and Joel Blum as George. The tour closed on 21 August 2011 at San Francisco's Orpheum Theatre.

As a promotion for the tour, Daniel Patrick Russell and Griffin Birney performed a special showcase on the television game show The Price Is Right.

==== Third North American tour ====
A third tour opened on 31 October 2011 at the Fox Theatre in St. Louis under a new production company, Networks, and with previous cast members from the second tour as well as the Toronto cast. Notable cast replacement included Ben Cook as Billy. The tour went on hiatus after playing its final performance in North America at Hartford, Connecticut on 23 June 2013, before transferring to Brazil for a limited engagement at the Credicard Hall in São Paulo from 2 to 18 August 2013. It was the first time the tour played in a Latin American country and was the first musical to take its international tour to Brazil since Cats in 2006. The tour played its final performance with Ty Forhan, Drew Minard and Mitchell Tobin as the last to share the title role.

=== 2026 UK tour and 2027 West End revival ===
In December 2025, the producers behind the original production announced their search for children to play the roles of Billy, Michael and Debbie in a forthcoming run of the musical. A UK tour was subsequently announced, including a run at the Adelphi Theatre in London's West End from February to July 2027.

In June 2026, the four boys that will play the title role in the national tour and West End season were announced. It was also announced that original Billy Elliot, Liam Mower, will return to the show to play Older Billy.

The tour opened at the Sunderland Empire on 4 November 2026 and will play there until 28 November, followed by the Palace Theatre, Manchester and the Edinburgh Playhouse before the Adelphi season, which runs from 12 February to 31 July 2027. Dates in Cardiff, Dublin, Bradford and Bristol were added to the itinerary in September 2026, carrying the tour into February 2028.

=== Other productions ===
The first non-English language production of the musical opened in Seoul on 10 August 2010 in previews and officially on 14 August at the LG Arts Center. It originally starred Jin-Ho Jung, Ji-Myeong Lee, Sunu Lim, and Se-Yong Kim in the title role of Billy with Junhyung Kim later joining the cast in January 2011. Supporting cast included Young-joo Chung as Mrs. Wilkinson, Won-hee Cho as Billy's father, and Jae-hyung Lim as Tony. This production closed on 27 February 2011.

The first US regional production of the show opened on 16 June 2014 at The Muny in St. Louis, Missouri, for a week-long run. Included among the cast were Tade Biesinger as Billy, Emily Skinner as Mrs. Wilkinson, Daniel Oreskes as Dad, and Patti Perkins as Grandma, all reprising their roles from the original Broadway production. On 25 October 2013, the Ogunquit Playhouse announced that it would stage their own production which ran from 25 June through 26 July 2014. Included among the cast were Anastasia Barzee as Mrs. Wilkinson, Sam Faulkner and Noah Parets as Billy, Armand Schultz as Billy's dad, Dale Soules as Grandma, Anthony Festa as Tony and Joel Blum as George. Other regional productions have also been announced.

In December 2013 the Norwegian production company SceneKvelder announced that it would stage their own production of the show at the Folketeatret in Oslo. This production opened on 18 September 2014 for a limited run and was the first international non-replica production to open. Kevin Haugan played the title role with Hilde Lyrån as Mrs. Wilkinson, Nils Ole Oftebro as Billy's dad and Benjamin Helstad as Tony.

On 30 November 2014 Billy Elliot premiered in the Netherlands at the AFAS Circustheater in The Hague (Scheveningen) after previews starting on 6 November. Billy was alternately played by Tydo Korver, Stijn van der Plas, Svenno van Kleij, Carlos Puts, Jillis Roshanali and Roan Pronk. Among the cast were Dutch musical actress Pia Douwes as Mrs. Wilkinson, Bas Heerkens as Billy's father, and Reinier Demeijer as Tony. This production was produced by the original English producers (Universal Stage Productions, Working Title Films, Old Vic Productions) and by Joop van den Ende Theaterproducties/Stage Entertainment.

On 22 January 2015 Billy Elliot premiered in Denmark at Det Ny Teater in Copenhagen. Billy was alternately played by Oscar Dietz, Carl-Emil Lohmann and Nicolas Stefan Anker Markovic. The cast included actress Julie Steincke as Mrs. Wilkinson, Kristian Boland as Billy's father, and Sebastian Harris as Tony.

In March 2015 Billy Elliot premiered in Estonia, Tallinn, at the Nordea Concert Hall. Among the cast were Kaire Vilgats as Mrs. Wilkinson and Mait Malmsten as Billy's father.

On 5 May 2015 Billy Elliot premiered in Italy at Il Sistina in Rome. Billy was alternately played by Alessandro Frola and Simone Romualdi. Among the cast were Sabrina Marciano as Mrs. Wilkinson, Christian Roberto as Michael, Luca Biagini as Billy's father, Cristina Noci as Grandma, Donato Altomare as Tony, Elisabetta Tulli as Mum, Jacopo Pelliccia as George and Maurizio Semeraro as Mr. Braithwaite.

Billy Elliot premiered in Malmö, Sweden on 13 February 2016 at Malmö Opera. Billy was alternately played by Grim Lohman, Oliver Lohk and Jacob Hermansson and Michael by David Fridholm, Carl Sjögren and Uno Elger. Among the cast were Åsa Fång as Mrs. Wilkinson, Lars Väringer as Dad, Rasmus Mononen as Tony, Paul James Rooney and Robert Thomsen playing the role of Older Billy. The production moved to Stockholm in March 2017.

In May 2016, the Grandstreet Theatre in Helena, Montana, became the first American, non-professional theatre company to stage this musical.

On 1 June 2016 Billy Elliot premiered in Israel at City Hall Theater in Cinema City Gelilot Complex. Billy was alternately played by Arnon Herring and Shon Granot-Zilbershtein. The main cast included Daphna Dekel as Mrs. Wilkinson, Avi Kushnir as Billy's father, Oshri Cohen as Tony and Dina Doron as Billy's grandmother. The role of Michael was alternately played by Sahar Lev-Shomer, TimoTi Sannikov and Amit Brenner. The role of Debbie was alternately played by Naya Federman, Sasha Bezrukov and Maya Mintz. Eldar Groisman directed and choreographed the show, which was translated into Hebrew by Eli Bijaoui.

The first Hungarian language production of the musical—a non-replica staging—debuted on 29 July 2016 at the Hungarian State Opera House in Budapest, directed by Tamás Szirtes and choreographed by Ákos Tihanyi. The production was originally intended for the Erkel Theatre which has more seats but was relocated after the ticket sales started. Hungarian translation is by István Puller and Ferenc Bárány. It was the first musical ever to be performed at the Opera House. The production was later moved to Erkel Theatre where it was originally intended. In this production, the role of Michael—the only identifiably homosexual character in the original—is significantly reduced, and his homosexuality is not made explicit. Despite this, on 1 June 2018, ahead of the production's third summer season, conservative Hungarian newspaper Magyar Idők published an article calling the musical "gay propaganda", and accused it of corrupting children and turning them gay. Ticket sales fell in response to the article, and 15 performances had to be cancelled (29 other performances went ahead as planned). It was announced shortly after that the cancelled performances would be made up for during the final season of production in 2019.

In July and August 2022 a completely new UK production was presented at the Curve, Leicester. The revival, by the theatre's artistic director Nikolai Foster, was the first full-scale staging of Billy Elliot in the UK since the original. It was a completely new staging, with a new set design by Michael Taylor and choreography by Lucy Hind. It was the biggest in-house production that the Curve Theatre has ever mounted.

== Social and cultural issues ==
=== Subversion of gender roles ===
The production is notable in its empowering promotion of the subversion of traditional gender roles, promoting acceptance and open-mindedness; both implicitly in the show's decision to represent drag and the challenging of traditional masculinity in a positive light, and explicitly, in the shows lyrics and repeated core message of the value of 'expressing yourself' and embracing one's 'individuality.' Billy's subversion of traditional masculine "gender performativity" is highlighted against the contrast of Durham's extremely masculine working-class society. With this focus, Billy Elliot has the position of being "the first mainstream British entertainment to directly interrogate homophobic prejudice as a function of patriarchal society." With the impact of its empowering message of acceptance entering public discourse and education campaigns thanks to the prominence and financial success of the show.

=== Empowering the working class ===
Within the social context of the 1984–85 miner's strike, Billy Elliot's personal struggle to continue dancing is contrasted powerfully to choreographed violence due to the strike. The repetition of 'solidarity forever' is an empowering musical motif to represent the perceived power of the miners union. The message of strength in unity is assisted by emotive and colloquial lyrics, producing audience affect as the empowered everyday working men fight ardently against the British government. However the eventual fall of the worker's strike suggests that class differences are inevitable, yet there remains an allusion to strength despite this loss of power.

== Synopsis ==
=== Act I ===
In County Durham, the 1984–85 coal miners' strike is just beginning ("The Stars Look Down"). Motherless eleven-year-old Billy Elliot stays behind after his boxing class to give keys to Sandra Wilkinson, who runs a ballet class. The class is all girls, but Billy is attracted to the grace of the dance ("Shine"). At first, Billy's interest in dance is easily concealed from his family, as the only person home at the time is his grandmother. She reveals to Billy the abuse she suffered at the hands of her late husband, but that she found great joy in dance ("Grandma's Song").

While his father Jackie Elliot, brother Tony Elliot and neighbours are on strike and clash with riot police, Billy secretly takes dance lessons ("Solidarity"). During the number, the violent reality of the strike is contrasted with the peaceful practice of ballet.

Eventually, Jackie discovers Billy in the ballet class and forbids him from attending the lessons. Mrs. Wilkinson, who recognizes Billy's potential, privately suggests that he should audition for the Royal Ballet School in London, offering free private lessons to prepare him for the audition. Billy is not sure what he wants to do, so he visits his best friend Michael Caffrey for advice. He finds Michael wearing a dress. Michael persuades Billy to have fun with him by dressing up in woman's clothing, rejecting the restrictive inhibitions of their working class community ("Expressing Yourself").

For his first private ballet lesson, Billy brings things to inspire a special dance for the audition, including a letter from his mother ("Dear Billy (Mum's Letter)"). Through his lessons, he develops an impressive routine for his audition ("Born to Boogie"), as he forms a close bond with Mrs. Wilkinson. Her daughter, Debbie Wilkinson, tries to discourage Billy from auditioning because she has a crush on him. Meanwhile, Jackie and Tony are engaged in daily battles with riot police that often turn bloody. They struggle to support the family with very little in strike and union pay, a difficult task as the strike goes on for nearly a year.

When the day of the Royal Ballet School audition comes, the police come through the village, injuring Tony. Billy's family and some members of the community are gathered at the Elliot home, where Mrs. Wilkinson arrives when Billy fails to meet her to leave for the audition. She reveals that she has been teaching Billy in preparation for this audition, which upsets and angers Jackie and Tony. Tony tries to force Billy to dance on the table in front of everyone. Suddenly, the police approach and, as everyone escapes, Billy calls out to his father saying that his mother would have let him dance, to which Jackie says, "Your Mam's dead!". Billy goes into a rage ("Angry Dance"), and from that moment on, he stays away from anything related to ballet.

=== Act II ===
Six months later at the miner's annual Christmas show, the children put on a show disparaging Prime Minister Margaret Thatcher, who is seen as the antagonist by the coal miners ("Merry Christmas, Maggie Thatcher"). Billy's father gets drunk and sings an old folk song that elicits memories of his deceased wife and the usually stoic man leaves in tears ("Deep Into the Ground"). Left alone with Billy in the Community Centre, Michael reveals he has feelings for him, but Billy says that the fact that he likes ballet does not mean that he is gay. Michael gives him a kiss on the cheek. Michael tries to get Billy to show him some dancing, but Billy is sad and tells him to leave.

Michael departs, but leaves a music player running. Billy feels like dancing for the first time since the day of the aborted audition and dances while dreaming of being a grown-up dancer ("Swan Lake"). Unknown to Billy, his father arrives and watches him dance. Overcome with emotion, Jackie goes to Mrs. Wilkinson's house to discuss Billy's prospects as a dancer. She confirms Billy's talent, but is not sure whether or not he would get into the Royal Ballet School after missing the audition. Mrs. Wilkinson offers to help pay for the trip to London for the next audition, but Jackie refuses and leaves, questioning his working-class pride and the future mining has for his boys.

Jackie decides the only way to help Billy is to return to work. When Tony sees his father cross the picket line, he becomes infuriated and the two argue over what is more important: unity of the miners or helping Billy achieve his dream ("He Could Be A Star"). The argument comes to blows and Billy is hit accidentally. A miner chastises them for fighting and says that the important thing is looking after the child. One by one, the miners give money to help pay for the trip to the audition, but Billy still does not have enough for the bus fare to London. A strike-breaker arrives and offers him hundreds of pounds. An enraged Tony attempts to shun his donation, but no one else speaks up in his support. Now drained of hope, Tony dismally ponders whether there's a point for anything anymore, and runs off.

Billy and his father arrive at the Royal Ballet School for the audition. While Jackie waits outside, an upper-crust Londoner highlights the contrast between the Elliots and the families of the other applicants. Jackie meets a dancer with a thick Northern accent, who confesses that his father does not support his ballet career, but sharply advises Jackie to "get behind" his boy. Billy nervously finishes the audition with a feeling that he did not do well. As he packs his gear, he becomes overwhelmed and punches another dancer. The audition committee reminds Billy of the strict standards of the school and their zero-tolerance on violence. They have received an enthusiastic letter from Mrs. Wilkinson explaining Billy's background, situation and talent/potential; then ask him to describe what it feels like when he dances. Billy responds with a heartfelt declaration of his passion ("Electricity").

Back in Durham, the Elliots resume life, but times are tough and the miners are running a soup kitchen to ensure everyone is fed. Eventually, Billy receives a letter from the school and, overwhelmed and fearful, knowing that it heralds the end of the life he has known, informs his family that he was not accepted. Tony retrieves the letter from the waste bin and discovers that Billy had lied and actually was accepted – the family rejoice. At the same time, the miners' union has caved in; they lost the strike. Tony laments that miners are "dinosaurs", that by the time Billy returns home, all surrounding village's men will be jobless. Billy visits Mrs. Wilkinson at the dance class to thank her for everything she did to help him. Debbie is sad that Billy will be leaving.

Billy packs his things for the trip to the school and says goodbye to the soon-to-be-unemployed miners who are returning unhappily to work ("Once We Were Kings"). Billy says goodbye to his dead mother, who often visits him in his imagination ("Dear Billy (Billy's Reply)"). Billy breaks the fourth wall and begins to walk down the center aisle before Michael stops him to say goodbye. Billy drops his suitcase and runs onto the stage to give Michael a kiss on the cheek. Billy then walks back off stage, retrieves his suitcase and walks out toward his future alone.

The entire cast comes out on stage and calls Billy back to celebrate the bright future ahead of him ("Finale").

== Musical numbers ==
Act I

- "The Stars Look Down" – Company
- "Shine" – Ballet Girls, Mrs. Wilkinson, Billy & Mr Braithwaite
- "Grandma's Song" – Grandma
- "Solidarity" – Ballet Girls, Billy, Mrs. Wilkinson, Miners & The Police
- "Expressing Yourself" – Billy, Michael, and Ensemble
- "The Letter (Mum's Letter)" – Mrs. Wilkinson, Mum and Billy
- "Born to Boogie" – Mrs. Wilkinson, Billy, and Mr. Braithwaite
- "Angry Dance" – Billy & Male Ensemble

Act II

- "Merry Christmas, Maggie Thatcher" – Tony and Partiers
- "Deep Into the Ground" – Jackie
- "Swan Lake" – Billy and Billy Older Self
- "He Could Be a Star" – Jackie and Tony (titled "He Could Go and He Could Shine" in US & UK tour productions)
- "Electricity" – Billy
- "Once We Were Kings" – Company
- "The Letter (Billy's Reply)" – Mum and Billy
- Finale – Company

== Original cast recording ==
The original London cast recording was released on CD in 2005. This 75-minute CD features all the musical numbers listed above, excluding the instrumental Swan Lake track. A two disc 'Special Edition' version was later released, however the second CD only totals 9 minutes and contains versions of "The Letter", "Electricity" and "Merry Christmas, Maggie Thatcher" performed by Elton John.

== Original casts ==
The principal original cast of the West End, Broadway, Australian and UK tour productions:

Character	West End	Australia	Broadway	Billy Elliot: Live	UK tour	UK tour	West End
Character	2005	2007	2008	2014	2016	2026	2027
Billy Elliot	Liam Mower James Lomas George Maguire	Rhys Kosakowski Lochlan Denholm Rarmian Newton Nick Twiney	Kiril Kulish David Alvarez Trent Kowalik	Elliott Hanna	Adam Abbou Matthew Lyons Haydn May Lewis Smallman	Noah Mannion Rafferty Smale Spencer Collins William Gurney	Noah Mannion Rafferty Smale Spencer Collins William Gurney
Mrs. Wilkinson	Haydn Gwynne	Genevieve Lemon	Haydn Gwynne	Ruthie Henshall	Annette McLaughlin	Annette McLaughlin	Annette McLaughlin
Dad	Tim Healy	Richard Piper	Gregory Jbara	Deka Walmsley	Martin Walsh	Deka Walmsley	Deka Walmsley
Tony	Joe Caffrey	Justin Smith	Santino Fontana	Chris Grahamson	Scott Garnham	Jack Bandeira	Jack Bandeira
Grandma	Ann Emery	Lola Nixon	Carole Shelley	Ann Emery	Andrea Miller	Lesley Joseph	Lesley Joseph
Mr. Braithwaite	Steve Elias	John Xintavelonis	Thommie Retter	David Muscat	Daniel Page	Adam Crossley	Adam Crossley
George	Trevor Fox	Linal Haft	Joel Hatch	Howard Crossley	Leo Atkin	Mark Pearce	Mark Pearce
Mum	Stephanie Putson	Samantha Morley	Leah Hocking	Claudia Bradley	Nikki Gerrard	Natasha J Barnes	Natasha J Barnes
Older Billy	Isaac James	Joshua Horner	Stephen Hanna	Liam Mower	Luke Cinque-White	Liam Mower	Liam Mower
Michael	Ryan Longbottom Ashley Luke Lloyd Brad Kavanagh	Thomas Doherty Landen Hale-Brown Scott Eveleigh Joel Slater	David Bologna Frank Dolce	Zach Atkinson	Henry Farmer Elliot Stiff Samuel Torpey Taylor Graham	Harper Etienne Dalton Jones Theo Kamande Oisin-Luca Pegg	Harper Etienne Dalton Jones Theo Kamande Oisin-Luca Pegg
Debbie	Lucy Stephenson Emma Hudson Brooke Havana Bailey	Shannon Joliff Fiona Booker Kelsi Boyden Taylor-Rose Campanella	Erin Whyland	Demi Lee	Lilly Cadwallender Evie Martin Italia Ross	Lola Cant Paige Cook Scarlett Gardener	Lola Cant Paige Cook Scarlett Gardener

Notable West End replacements

- Billy – Leon Cooke, Matthew Koon, Layton Williams, Corey Snide, Oliver Taylor, Trent Kowalik, Dean-Charles Chapman, Fox Jackson-Keen, Tom Holland, Tade Biesinger
- Michael – Tom Holland, Jake Pratt
- Debbie – Amy Duggan, Megan Jossa
- Mrs. Wilkinson – Sally Dexter, Jackie Clune, Joanna Riding, Genevieve Lemon, Gillian Bevan, Ruthie Henshall
- Grandma – Diane Langton, Gillian Elisa
- Dad – James Gaddas, Philip Whitchurch, Joe Caffrey, Martin Marquez
- Tony – Craig Gallivan, Tom Lorcan, Killian Donnelly
- Ballet girl – Mia McKenna-Bruce

Notable Broadway replacements

- Billy – Alex Ko, Michael Dameski, Myles Erlick, Tade Biesinger
- Mrs. Wilkinson – Kate Hennig, Emily Skinner
- Dad – Daniel Jenkins
- Tony – Will Chase
- Michael - Trevor Braun
- Grandma – Katherine McGrath
- Debbie – Lilla Crawford
- Sharon Percy – Holly Taylor

Notable Australian replacements

- Billy – Corey Snide, Daniel Patrick Russell, Dayton Tavares, Michael Dameski

== Awards and nominations ==
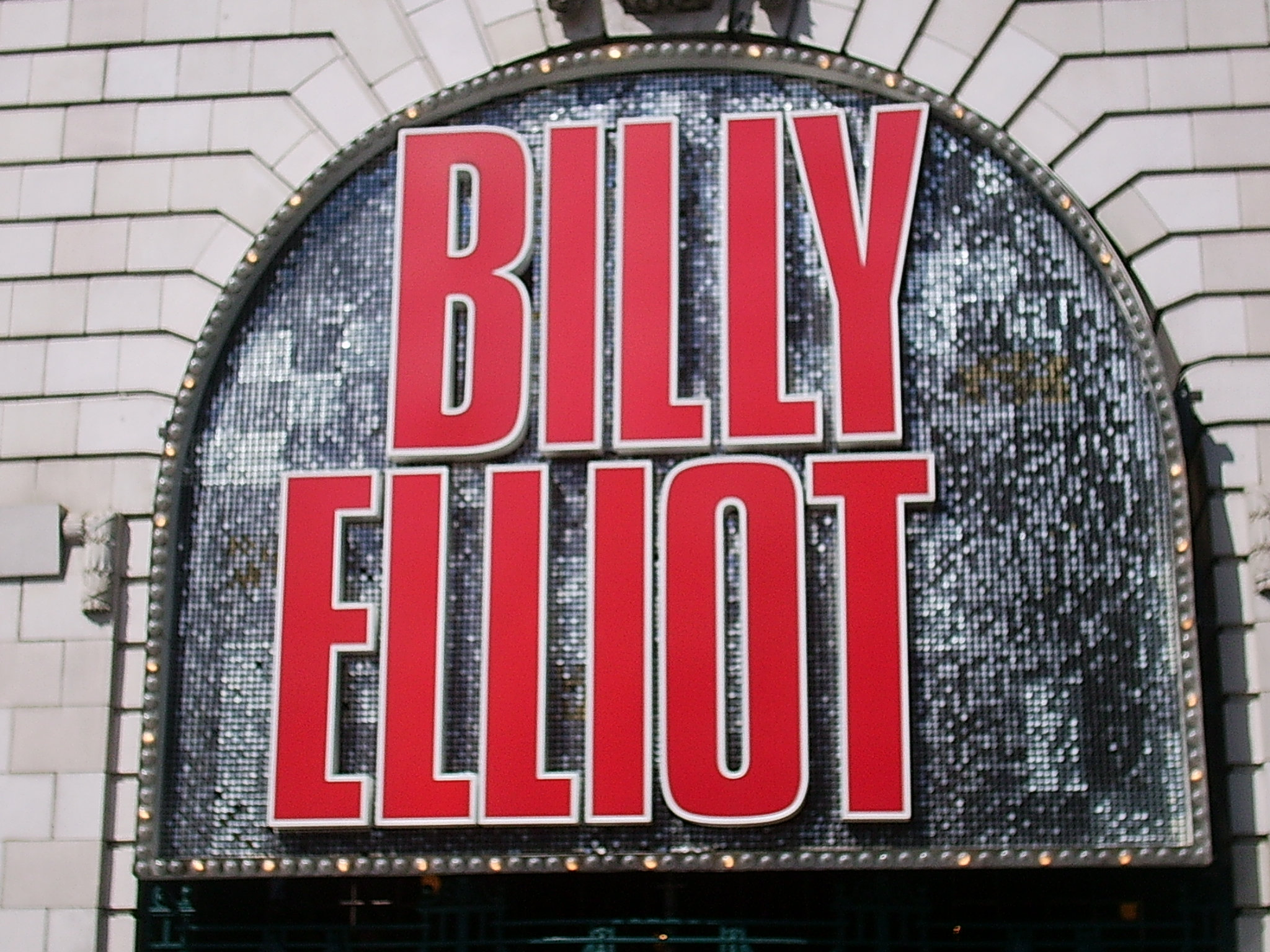
Billy Elliot sign in West End

The West End production was nominated for nine 2006 Laurence Olivier Awards and won four, including Best New Musical. At age thirteen, Liam Mower was the youngest actor to win the award, and the actors playing Billy were the first to win the award in a shared capacity. James Lomas, George Maguire, and Mower also jointly received the Theatre Goers' Choice Award in 2006 for Newcomer of the Year. The production also won Best Musical at the Evening Standard Theatre Awards in 2006, among others. The Sydney production was nominated for eleven 2008 Helpmann Awards and won seven, including Best Musical. The Sydney production was nominated for three 2007 Sydney Theatre Awards and won all three including Best Production of a Musical. The Melbourne production was nominated for twelve 2008 Green Room Awards and won six, including Best Production Music Theatre. The Broadway production received 15 Tony Award nominations in 2009, tied with The Producers for the most nominations ever received by a single show, although this was surpassed in 2016 by Hamilton with 16 nominations. It won ten Tony Awards, including the Best Musical at the 63rd Tony Awards. The lead actor award was shared by David Alvarez, Trent Kowalik and Kiril Kulish, the three boys who opened in the title role, marking the first time in Tony history the award has been shared by three actors. The production also won in all ten of its Drama Desk Awards nominations, including Outstanding Musical. It garnered ten 2008–09 Outer Critics Circle Awards nominations, winning seven, including Outstanding New Broadway Musical, as well as receiving an honorary Special Achievement Award for Alvarez, Kowalik and Kulish. The six juvenile principals (Alvarez, Kowalik, Kulish, David Bologna, Frank Dolce and Erin Whyland) were recognized with an honorary Young Artist Award for Outstanding Broadway Musical Ensemble at the 30th Young Artist Awards.

=== Original London production ===
Year	Award Ceremony	Category	Nominee	Result
2005	Evening Standard Theatre Awards	Best Musical		Won
2006	Critics' Circle Theatre Awards	Best Musical		Won
2006	Laurence Olivier Awards	Best New Musical		Won
2006	Laurence Olivier Awards	Best Actor in a Musical	James Lomas, George Maguire and Liam Mower	Won
2006	Laurence Olivier Awards	Best Actress in a Musical	Haydn Gwynne	Nominated
2006	Laurence Olivier Awards	Best Performance in a Supporting Role in a Musical	Tim Healy	Nominated
2006	Laurence Olivier Awards	Best Director	Stephen Daldry	Nominated
2006	Laurence Olivier Awards	Best Theatre Choreographer	Peter Darling	Won
2006	Laurence Olivier Awards	Best Set Design	Ian MacNeil	Nominated
2006	Laurence Olivier Awards	Best Lighting Design	Rick Fisher	Nominated
2006	Laurence Olivier Awards	Best Sound Design	Paul Arditti	Won

=== Original Broadway production ===
Year	Award Ceremony	Category	Nominee	Result
2009	Tony Award	Best Musical		Won
2009	Tony Award	Best Book of a Musical	Lee Hall	Won
2009	Tony Award	Best Original Score	Lee Hall and Elton John	Nominated
2009	Tony Award	Best Actor in a Musical	David Alvarez, Trent Kowalik and Kiril Kulish	Won
2009	Tony Award	Best Featured Actor in a Musical	David Bologna	Nominated
2009	Tony Award	Best Featured Actor in a Musical	Gregory Jbara	Won
2009	Tony Award	Best Featured Actress in a Musical	Haydn Gwynne	Nominated
2009	Tony Award	Best Featured Actress in a Musical	Carole Shelley	Nominated
2009	Tony Award	Best Direction of a Musical	Stephen Daldry	Won
2009	Tony Award	Best Choreography	Peter Darling	Won
2009	Tony Award	Best Orchestrations	Martin Koch	Won
2009	Tony Award	Best Scenic Design	Ian MacNeil	Won
2009	Tony Award	Best Costume Design	Nicky Gillibrand	Nominated
2009	Tony Award	Best Lighting Design	Rick Fisher	Won
2009	Tony Award	Best Sound Design	Paul Arditti	Won
2009	Drama Desk Award	Outstanding Musical		Won
2009	Drama Desk Award	Outstanding Book of a Musical	Lee Hall	Won
2009	Drama Desk Award	Outstanding Featured Actor in a Musical	Gregory Jbara	Won
2009	Drama Desk Award	Outstanding Featured Actress in a Musical	Haydn Gwynne	Won
2009	Drama Desk Award	Outstanding Director of a Musical	Stephen Daldry	Won
2009	Drama Desk Award	Outstanding Choreography	Peter Darling	Won
2009	Drama Desk Award	Outstanding Orchestrations	Martin Koch	Won
2009	Drama Desk Award	Outstanding Music	Elton John	Won
2009	Drama Desk Award	Outstanding Lighting Design	Rick Fisher	Won
2009	Drama Desk Award	Outstanding Sound Design	Paul Arditti	Won
2009	Outer Critics Circle Award	Outstanding New Broadway Musical		Won
2009	Outer Critics Circle Award	Outstanding New Score		Won
2009	Outer Critics Circle Award	Outstanding Featured Actor in a Musical	Gregory Jbara	Won
2009	Outer Critics Circle Award	Outstanding Featured Actress in a Musical	Haydn Gwynne	Won
2009	Outer Critics Circle Award	Outstanding Featured Actress in a Musical	Carole Shelley	Nominated
2009	Outer Critics Circle Award	Outstanding Director of a Musical	Stephen Daldry	Won
2009	Outer Critics Circle Award	Outstanding Choreography	Peter Darling	Won
2009	Outer Critics Circle Award	Outstanding Costume Design	Nicky Gillibrand	Nominated
2009	Outer Critics Circle Award	Outstanding Lighting Design	Rick Fisher	Won
2009	Outer Critics Circle Award	Outstanding Set Design	Ian MacNeil	Nominated
2009	Outer Critics Circle Award	Special Achievement Award	David Alvarez, Trent Kowalik and Kiril Kulish	Honored
2009	Theatre World Award		David Alvarez, Trent Kowalik and Kiril Kulish	Won
2009	New York Drama Critics' Circle Award	Best Musical		Won
2009	Young Artist Award	Outstanding Broadway Musical Ensemble	David Alvarez, Trent Kowalik, Kiril Kulish, David Bologna, Frank Dolce and Erin Whyland	Honored

=== Original Australian production ===
Year	Award Ceremony	Category	Nominee	Result
2008	Helpmann Awards	Best Musical		Won
2008	Helpmann Awards	Best Male Actor in a Musical	Rhys Kowsakowski, Rarmian Newton, Nick Twiney and Lochlan Denholm	Won
2008	Helpmann Awards	Best Female Actor in a Musical	Genevieve Lemon	Won
2008	Helpmann Awards	Best Male Actor in a Supporting Role in a Musical	Linal Haft	Nominated
2008	Helpmann Awards	Best Female Actor in a Supporting Role in a Musical	Lola Nixon	Nominated
2008	Helpmann Awards	Best Direction of a Musical	Stephen Daldry	Won
2008	Helpmann Awards	Best Choreography in a Musical	Peter Darling	Won
2008	Helpmann Awards	Best Scenic Design	Ian MacNeil	Nominated
2008	Helpmann Awards	Best Lighting Design	Rick Fisher	Won
2008	Helpmann Awards	Best Music Direction	Stephen Amos	Won
2008	Helpmann Awards	Best Sound Design	Paul Arditti	Nominated
2008	Sydney Theatre Awards	Best Production of a Musical		Won
2008	Sydney Theatre Awards	Best Performance by an Actor in a Musical	Rhys Kowsakowski, Rarmian Newton, Nick Twiney and Lochlan Denholm	Won
2008	Sydney Theatre Awards	Best Performance by an Actress in a Musical	Genevieve Lemon	Won
2008	Green Room Awards	Best Production Music Theatre		Won
2008	Green Room Awards	Best Male Actor in a Leading Role	Rhys Kowsakowski, Dayton Tavares, Michael Dameski, Joshua Denyer and Joshua Weiss Gates	Won
2008	Green Room Awards	Best Male Actor in a Leading Role	Richard Piper	Nominated
2008	Green Room Awards	Best Female Actor in a Leading Role	Genevieve Lemon	Won
2008	Green Room Awards	Best Male Actor in a Featured Role	Thomas Doherty, Landen Hale-Brown, Joel Slater and Liam Dodds	Won
2008	Green Room Awards	Best Male Actor in a Featured Role	Mike Smith	Nominated
2008	Green Room Awards	Best Direction Music Theatre	Stephen Daldry	Won
2008	Green Room Awards	Best Choreography in a Musical	Peter Darling	Won
2008	Green Room Awards	Best Lighting and/or Sound	Rick Fisher	Nominated
2008	Green Room Awards	Best Music Direction	Stephen Amos	Nominated
2008	Green Room Awards	Best Costume and/or Set Design	Nicky Gillibrand	Nominated
2008	Green Room Awards	Best Costume and/or Set Design	Ian MacNeil	Nominated

=== Original Korean production ===
Year	Award Ceremony	Category	Nominee	Result
2010	Korea Musical Awards	Best Foreign Musical		Won
2010	Korea Musical Awards	Best New Actor	Se-Yong Kim, Ji-Myung Lee, Jin-ho Jung and Sunu Lim	Won
2010	Korea Musical Awards	Best Supporting Actress	Young-Joo Chung	Won

=== Original Dutch production ===
Year	Award Ceremony	Category	Nominee	Result
2015	John Kraaijkamp Musical Award	Best Big Musical Production		Won
2015	John Kraaijkamp Musical Award	Best Actor in Leading Role	Bas Heerkens	Nominated
2015	John Kraaijkamp Musical Award	Best Actress in Leading Role	Pia Douwes	Nominated
2015	John Kraaijkamp Musical Award	Best Actor in Supporting Role	Dennis Willekens	Nominated
2015	John Kraaijkamp Musical Award	Outstanding Performance by a Young Performer	Carlos Puts	Won
2015	John Kraaijkamp Musical Award	Outstanding Performance by a Young Performer	Noah de Vos	Nominated
2015	John Kraaijkamp Musical Award	Best Book	Martine Bijl (translation)	Won
2015	John Kraaijkamp Musical Award	Best Orchestrations	Martin Koch	Nominated
2015	John Kraaijkamp Musical Award	Best Choreography	Peter Darling	Nominated
2015	John Kraaijkamp Musical Award	Best Set Design	Ian MacNeil	Nominated

== See also ==
- Billy Elliot
- The Stars Look Down
- List of Tony and Olivier Award–winning musicals
