= Oliver Taylor (actor) =

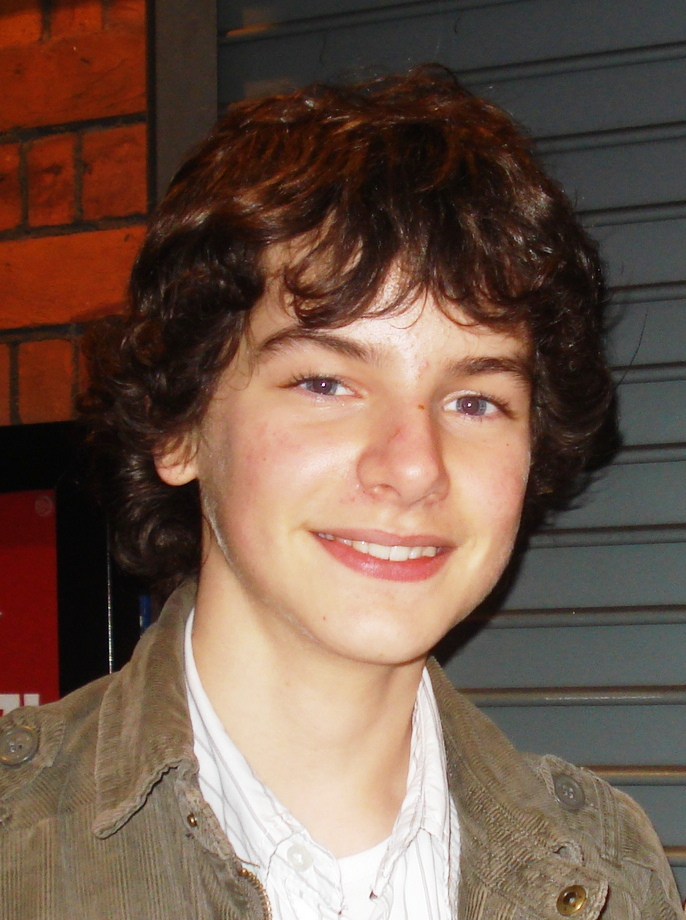
Taylor in 2008

Oliver Taylor (born 1994) is an English stage actor and dancer, best known for playing the title role in Billy Elliot the Musical at the Victoria Palace Theatre, London.

== Career ==
Taylor is from Paignton, Devon. He began dancing at the age of 3 when his sister's dance teacher invited him to join in. He attends the Buckingham Dance Studios in Paignton. In 2006, Taylor won the Fonteyn Nureyev Young Dancers Competition (Junior level) run by the Royal Academy of Dance and was awarded the Young Dancer of the Year title.

He has performed in a few theatre productions near where he live. He played the part of the Boy in The Snowman, the Nutcracker in The Nutcracker, and Franz in Coppélia. He was featured in Ready Steady Cook (2006) and took part in a children's BBC programme Take a Bow (2007).

Taylor successfully auditioned for Billy Elliot the Musical in September 2006. After training since January 2007, he gave his first performance on Monday, 18 June 2007. In August 2007 he features in an ITV documentary about the musical, together with the actor James Gaddas (who played his on-stage father). On 1 December 2007, the company official bade farewell to Taylor along with Ryan Longbottom, who played Michael and Leigh Laurie, who played Debbie. Taylor's 50th and final performance was 15 December 2007.

After finishing his run as Billy, Taylor resumed his training at the Buckingham Dance Studios along with taking lessons as a mid associate of the Royal Ballet. He entered the 2nd Fonteyn Nureyev Young Dancers Competition (Senior level) and in February, 2008 became a winner of Wales & South West England (Including Channel Islands) heat. On 13 April 2008 he competed in the Final of the Competition that took place at the Bloomsbury Theatre, London. On 24 February 2008 he was featured (along with four other performers of Billy Elliot role) in BBC's show "Happy Birthday Brucie!" devoted to Bruce Forsyth's 80th birthday.

Taylor has also performed in a few theatre productions in Torquay. On 7 November 2008 he performed the role of Prince Albrecht in the production of Giselle prepared by the Buckingham Dance Studios and shown at the Princess Theatre. Another lead role was performed by him in the show "The Prince and the Pauper" at Babbacombe Theatre on 21 November 2009. In the show "Old Tyme Music Hall" that took place in summer 2009 at the Princess Theatre Taylor performed Nijinsky's Fire Bird Ballet Solo. On 27 November 2010 he was a leading dancer in "A Beatles Ballet" produced by the Buckingham Dance Studio.

In September 2010 Taylor continued his education as an A-level student at Churston Ferrers Grammar School. He is now reading History at the University of York.

== See also ==
- Billy Elliot the Musical
