= Tommy Batchelor =

American dancer

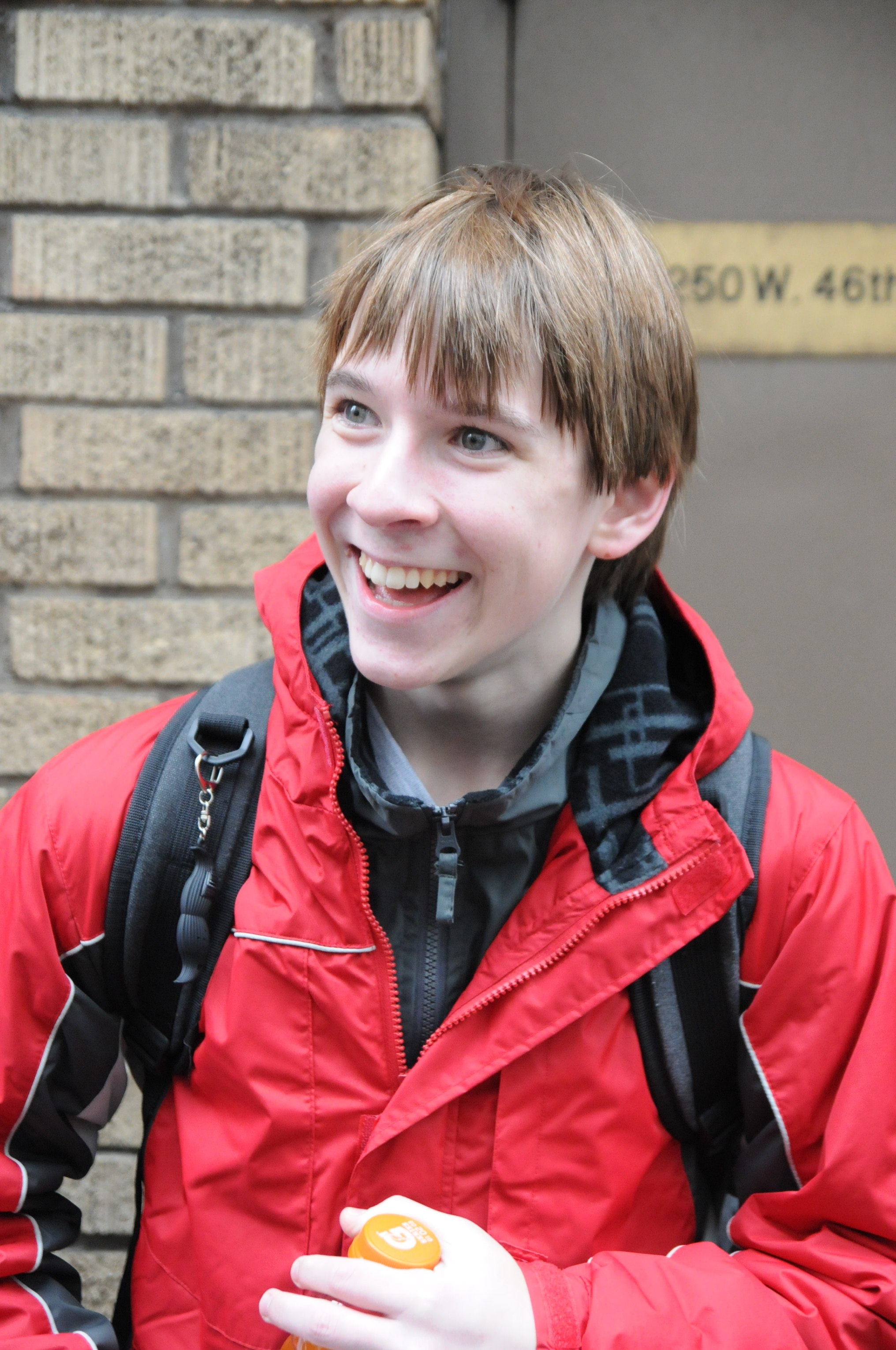
- Occupations: Actor; dancer; singer
- Years active: 2006–present
- Website: www.tommybatchelor.net

Tommy Batchelor is an American theatre performer from Palm Beach Gardens, Florida.

== Career ==
Batchelor began his training at the age of four at the Dance Factory in Minnesota.

Batchelor began his dancing career with two productions of The Nutcracker. Both of Batchelor's performances occurred with the Miami City Ballet in 2006 and 2010.

After his successful audition, Batchelor was cast in the part of "Billy" in the Broadway production of Billy Elliot: The Musical. Batchelor played his first performance on February 10, 2009. He played the Part of Billy until December 11, 2009. Batchelor left the Broadway production to reprise his role as "Billy" at the Oriental Theatre in Chicago, Illinois. Batchelor performed in Chicago as Billy between March 19, 2010 and October 10, 2010. Playing Billy Elliot required Tommy to be on stage for most of two hours and fifty minutes, acting and singing in a Northern British accent, dancing ballet, tap, and interpretive dance. "It's a lot of work," said Tommy, "but I love it, and the more you do it, and the more stamina you develop, the more fun it is." At the age of 18, Tommy continued his career joining the cast of "The Who's Tommy" as a dance soloist and ensemble member at the Short North Stage, Columbus, Ohio. Tommy currently attends The Ohio State University (OSU) as a Dance Major; performing in such productions as Dance Downtown and Drums Downtown with OSU.

== Credits ==
Theatre
Year	Title	Role	Theatre	Note
2006	The Nutcracker	Prince/Nutcracker	Miami City Ballet	
2010	The Nutcracker	Prince/Nutcracker	Miami City Ballet	
February 19, 2009- December 11, 2009	Billy Elliot: The Musical	Billy	Imperial Theatre	Broadway
March 19, 2010- October 10, 2010	Billy Elliot: The Musical	Billy	Oriental Theatre	Chicago, Illinois
June 2, 2012- July 2, 2012	Rocky Mountain Silhouettes	Silhouettes Performer	Venetian Hotel	Las Vegas, Nevada
March 16, 2014- April 27, 2014	The Who's Tommy the Musical	Dance Soloist and ensemble	Short North Stage	Columbus, Ohio
