= John Xintavelonis =

Australian actor and comedian

John Xintavelonis (also known professionally as John X) is a Tasmanian actor, singer, comedian, and theatre producer. His major professional musical theatre credits include Pumbaa in the "The Lion King", Mr Braithwaite in ''Billy Elliot the Musical'', and the Cowardly Lion in ''The Wizard of Oz''.

He is also a co-founder of Hobart company 'Blue Cow Theatre' and founder of the production company 'John X Presents'.

== Early Life and Education ==
Xintavelonis was born in Tasmania, Australia, in 1970 and grew up in Geilston Bay, Hobart. He attended Geilston Bay High School in 1985, before continuing study at Rosny College from 1987 to 1988.

He began performing while at college in 1986, participating in local theatre productions. At the age of 17, John opened a video rental shop by borrowing money from his father. This allowed him to create income while pursuing performing arts opportunities. He made his professional stage debut in late 1994, aged 24.

== Career ==
Starting in 1994, Xintavelonis began his professional stage career, performing in numerous theatre productions in Tasmania. He became a familiar face in local theatre, appearing in productions including ''Oliver!'' and ''Anything Goes''.

In 2005, John was cast as Pumbaa in the Australian production of Disney's "The Lion King", causing a significant breakthrough in his career. He performed in the Melbourne season and also the Shanghai season of the musical. In 2008, John played Mr. Braithwaite in Billy Elliot the Musical in Sydney and Melbourne.

Xintavelonis became involved in producing Tasmanian theatre by co-founding 'Blue Cow Theatre', and establishing 'John X Presents' with his wife in 2011. The company has produced numerous productions including "Rock of Ages" and "The Rocky Horror Show". The 2021 Rocky Horror Show production ran for 31 performances at Hobart's Theatre Royal and was described as the first locally produced professional commercial musical staged in Tasmania.

Alongside theatre, Xintavelonis has appeared in numerous screen credits. These include ''The Saddle Club'', ''Blue Heelers'', ''The Doctor Blake Mysteries'', ''The Menkoff Method'', and "Balding". He has also worked as a voice actor and presenter.

== Credits ==
Theatre
Year	Production	Company	Role	
c.1997	Guys and Dolls		Nathan Detroit	Theatre Royal MB
1997	Godspell	Hobart Repertory Theatre	Judas/Jeffrey	The Playhouse Theatre
1998	Ruddigore	Gilbert & Sullivan Society of Tasmania	Richard Dauntless	April 4 - 18 Playhouse Theatre
1998	Jesus Christ Superstar	Exit Left Productions	Herod	Tasman Room, Wrest Point Entertainment Centre, Hobart
1999	Trial by Jury	Gilbert & Sullivan Society of Tasmania	Directed by	Hobart Supreme Court
1999	My Fair Lady	Gilbert & Sullivan Society of Tasmania	Alfred P. Doolittle	July 23 - August 7 Theatre Royal
2000	Oliver!	Gilbert & Sullivan Society of Tasmania	Bill Sikes	July 18 - Aug 5 Theatre Royal
2000	Aussie Rules The Musical	Old Nick Company	Coach/Directed by	August 10-25 Peacock Theatre
2000	Anything Goes	Old Nick Company	Performer/Co-producer	Theatre Royal
2001	Sweet Charity	X Wellington Wellington X	Vittorio Vidal	Nov 3-17 Theatre Royal
2001	Trial by Jury	Gilbert & Sullivan Society of Tasmania	Directed by	Hobart Supreme Court
2001 2002	'Allo 'Allo!	Exit Left Productions	René	Theatre Royal
2002	The Sound of Music	Exit Left Productions	Uncle Max	Theatre Royal
2002	H.M.S. Pinafore	Gilbert & Sullivan Society of Tasmania	Captain Corcoran	Jan 18 - Feb 2 Peacock Theatre
2002	Moulin Rude (Uni Revue)	Old Nick Company	Perfomer/Directed by	
2003	Annie	Exit Left Productions	Daddy Warbucks	Theatre Royal
2003	Oklahoma!	Gilbert & Sullivan Society of Tasmania	Ali Hakim	June 27 - Jul 12 Theatre Royal
2004	Uni Revue	Old Nick Company	Perfomer/AD	
2005	The Lion King	Disney Theatrical Productions	Pumbaa	
2007	Trial by Jury	Gilbert & Sullivan Society of Tasmania	Directed by	Hobart Supreme Court
2008	Billy Elliot the Musical	Billy Australia	Mr Braithwaite	
2010	The Threepenny Opera	Malthouse Theatre / Victorian Opera	Mitch; understudy for Tiger Brown	
2010	The Boy from Oz	The Production Company	Dee Anthony / Dick Woolnough	
