= Michael Dameski =

Australian dancer and actor

- Born: Michael Dameski; 7 November 1995 (age 30); Sydney, New South Wales, Australia
- Occupations: Actor; dancer; singer
- Years active: 2001–present

Michael Dameski (born 7 November 1995) is an Australian dancer, actor and singer.

== Early career ==
When Dameski was six years old, he entered his first dance competition "The 2001 Australian Dance Idol" program. Without any formal dance training, Dameski placed in the top ten of the competition. Afterwards, he trained at Glenda Yee School of Dance located in Casula, New South Wales. Later, Dameski studied at the Brent Street Studios in Moore Park, N.S.W. where he was given the opportunity to represent Australia in the World Championships of Performing Arts in Los Angeles. At this event, he received gold in each category he entered and overall Junior World Dancer. In 2013 he won the Australian Dancer of the Year title at the Showcase Australian Dance Championships produced by Australian Peter Oxford (founder), after which Dameski went on to win the U.S. dance title Rainbow Dance in Las Vegas.

Dameski was a guest at the Zlatno Slavejce (Golden Nightingale) children's singing festival in Macedonia, where he recorded a song written especially for him entitled 'One Dance'. He also premiered on World Of Dance on NBC.

== Billy Elliot the Musical ==
In October 2008, Dameski joined the cast as one of the five Billys in the Sydney production of Billy Elliot the Musical along with Joshua Denyer, Rhys Kosakowski, Dayton Tavares and Joshua Waiss Gates. His final performance as Billy in Australia was the next to last show on 13 June 2009, in Melbourne.

Dameski departed Sydney 20 December 2009 to commence a season in the Broadway production of Billy Elliot the Musical.

Dameski left the Broadway production on 5 September 2010 to join the BETM 2nd North American Tour. He was in rehearsals with the new cast of that production in September and early October, before the tour began in Durham, North Carolina, on 30 October 2010. Dameski's last performance as Billy was 29 January 2011.

Dameski was a Green Room Award 2008 joint recipient for Male Artist In A Leading Role for Billy Elliot the Musical; as well as an Australian Dance Awards 2009 joint recipient for Outstanding Performance in a Stage Musical for the same role.

== Career Post-Billy ==
At the beginning of 2012, Dameski appeared on Young Talent Time as a guest competitor and won Heat 9, so he returned to another episode but didn't win the heat.

In February 2014, Dameski appeared on So You Think You Can Dance Australia and on 1 May 2014 won the competition first place, crowned Australia's Favourite Dancer for 2014. He was also an original cast member of the Dream Dance Company established by Marko Panzic.

Dameski was traveling with the first national tour of Newsies as Tommy boy and a Citizen of New York. Dameski also appeared in the "Newsies" Broadway Recording shown in theaters.

In 2018, Dameski appeared on the second season of the US TV show World of Dance in which he finished as the runner-up. He choreographed all routines on his own. He also appeared on The Ellen DeGeneres Show.

In February 2025, Dameski was featured as the male lead in Lady Gaga's music video, Abracadabra and working as a dancer on Gaga's "The Mayhem Ball" world tour.

== Stage credits ==
Year	Title	Role	Theatre	Note
16 October 2008- November 2008	Billy Elliot the Musical	Billy	Capitol Theatre	Sydney, Australia
January 2009- 13 June 2009	Billy Elliot the Musical	Billy	Her Majesty's Theatre	Melbourne, Australia
31 January 2010- 5 September 2010	Billy Elliot the Musical	Billy	Imperial Theatre	Broadway debut
6 November 2010- 29 January 2011	Billy Elliot the Musical	Billy	Various theatres	U.S. Tour

== Concept videos ==
Title	Release date	Dancers	Choreographers
DEAN LEWIS - Be Alright	Sept 7th, 2018	Michael Dameski & Ashley Gonzales	Kyle Hanagami
The Dream Dance Company	Apr 10th, 2018	Michael Dameski & Mitch Wynter	Michael Dameski, Mitch Wynter, Eden Petrovski & Marko Panzic

== Personal life ==
Dameski currently lives in Los Angeles, California.
