= Corey Snide =

American actor and dancer (born 1993)

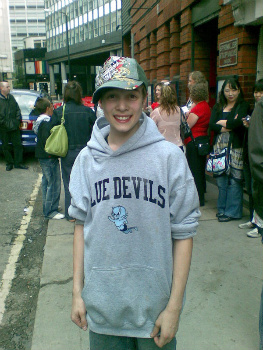
- Corey Snide
- Born: Corey John Snide; December 19, 1993 (age 32); Albany, New York, US
- Years active: 2007–present

Corey Snide (born December 19, 1993) is an American actor and dancer best known for his performance as Billy in Billy Elliot the Musical based on the hit film Billy Elliot. Snide is a graduate of Colonie Central High School (class of 2011), and of Juilliard (class of 2015).

== Career ==
He began dancing at the age of three and was trained in Tap, Jazz, Ballet, Street and Contemporary at Eleanor's School of the Dance.

Snide has competed in dance competitions across the United States and won many titles and awards in the category of 13 and under. He represented the United States in the World Competition 10 and Under in Riesa, Germany in Tap and Show Dance and won the Gold Medal in both areas for his age category of 13 and under. He has also won the Mini (Under 10) and Junior (Under 11) Outstanding Dancer Award from the New York City Dance Alliance.

In 2007 after successfully auditioning in the US for the title role of Billy in Billy Elliot the Musical he was sent to the UK to begin training for the London West End production and first performed on May 16, 2007, in the Victoria Palace Theatre.

He continued to perform in London until November 2007 when he was temporally transferred to the Sydney production to replace an injured Nick Twiney. His first performance in Sydney was on December 8, 2007, and he continued to perform until January 19, 2008, after which he returned to the London production. After a period of retraining for the London version of the show he completed two performances in London before further injuries to the Australian cast, this time to Lochlan Denholm, prompted his return to Sydney on February 27, 2008. In March 2008 he returned again to London to resume performances there. Corey's final performance as Billy was in London on July 5, 2008, after which he returned home to Albany, NY.

Snide got a small part in a pilot for Cupid (1998 TV series).

Snide played the understudy/alternate for the lead role of "Evan" in the Broadway musical show 13. He usually played the role during the weekend matinees.

In February 2010, Snide reprised his role of Evan in a production of "13 The Musical" with Capital Area Productions in NY. In July 2010, Corey Snide's winning tap dance performance at the 2010 NYCDA (New York City Dance Alliance) Nationals scored him a four year college scholarship to Marymount Manhattan College.

In March 2011, Snide was accepted into Juilliard, from which he graduated in 2015.

In July 2016, Snide started playing the understudy/alternate for the roles of "Coricopat" and "Mistoffelees" in the Broadway revival of the musical show Cats.

In 2018 he visited the Costa Rican dance academy, Jazzgoba. He re-visited Jazzgoba in April 2021 teaching Musical Theatre, Tap and Contemporary.

== Theatre ==
Theatre
Year	Title	Role	Theatre	Note
May 2007 - July 5, 2008	Billy Elliot: The Musical	Billy	Victoria Palace Theatre	West End
November 2007 - January 2008 recall February - March 2008	Billy Elliot: The Musical	Billy	Capitol Theatre	Sydney, Australia (Transferred temporarily to cover for an injured Billy)
September 2008- January 4, 2009	13	Evan (Alternate)	Bernard B. Jacobs Theatre	Broadway
July 2016 - December 2017	Cats	Coricopat, U/S Mistoffelees	Neil Simon Theatre	Broadway
March - September 2018	Carousel	Swing, Dance Captain	Imperial Theatre	Broadway
