= David Bologna =

American actor, dancer and singer

- Born: New Orleans, Louisiana, U.S.
- Education: New York University (B.A.)
- Occupations: Actor; dancer; singer
- Years active: 2008–present

David Bologna is an American actor, dancer and singer. Beginning conducting performance at the age of seven, Bologna became a Tony Award nominee at the age of fourteen as the Best Featured Actor in a Musical for their Broadway debut as Billy's flamboyant best friend Michael in Billy Elliot the Musical.

== Life and career ==
Born and raised in New Orleans, Bologna is the son of Rick Bologna and Holly Bologna. Their home was flooded when Hurricane Katrina hit New Orleans, and their family moved to Austin, Texas.

They were active in local theatre productions, including Bye Bye Birdie at Le Petit Theatre du Vieux Carre, “Seussical the Musical” with Brandt Blocker Presents at Six Flags New Orleans, and Peter Pan, until Hurricane Katrina forced their family to relocate to Austin, Texas. In Texas they performed with the Zachary Scott Theatre and the youth theatre kidsActing Studio and appeared in multiple productions, including Beauty and the Beast, Grease, and Cabaret.

They are a two-time winner of the North American Irish Dancing Championships and placed fifth in the World Irish Dance Championships. They also won the Big Easy Entertainment Award for their performances in Oliver! and The Music Man.

On November 13, 2008, Billy Elliot the Musical opened on Broadway featuring Bologna alternating in the role of Michael with Frank Dolce. Although the three actors who portrayed Billy shared the Tony nomination for Best Leading Actor in a Musical, Bologna alone was nominated as Best Featured Actor in a Musical, as they had been the one to "debut" the role in the first "official" performance. Bologna's last performance in Billy Elliot was on September 27, 2009, however they returned to perform the role of Michael on June 16, 2010, for a limited engagement which lasted until August 8, 2010.

== Awards ==
Awards
Year	Award	Category	Role	Show	Result	Ref.
2009	Tony Award	Best Performance by a Featured Actor in a Musical	Michael	Billy Elliot the Musical	Nominated	
