= David Alvarez (actor) =

Canadian dancer and actor (born 1994)

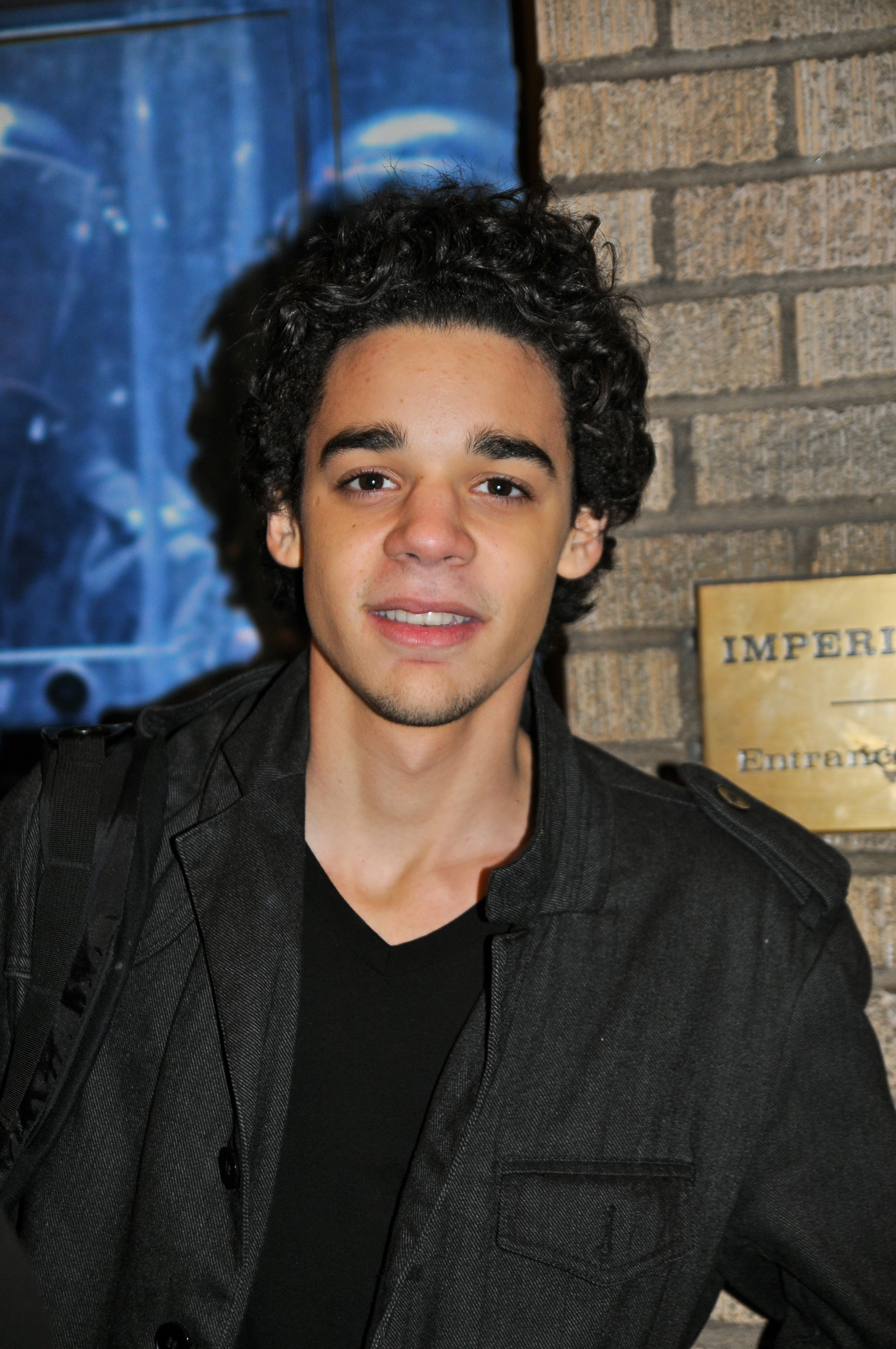
- Alvarez in 2012
- Born: David Alvarez-Gonzalez; May 11, 1994 (age 32); Montreal, Quebec, Canada
- Occupations: Dancer, actor
- Years active: 2008–present

David Alvarez (born May 11, 1994) is a Canadian dancer and actor, best known for being one of the original Billys in the Broadway production of Billy Elliot the Musical and becoming one of the youngest winners of the Tony Award for Best Actor in a Musical. He trained as a dancer with American Ballet Theatre and plays Bernardo in Steven Spielberg's 2021 film version of West Side Story.

== Early life and education ==
Alvarez was born David Alvarez-Gonzalez in Montreal, Quebec, to Cuban parents. His father, David Alvarez-Carbonell, is a professor of biology and chemistry, while his mother, Yanek Gonzalez, is an actress and director of theater. His first languages were French and Spanish. He moved to San Diego, California, with his family when his father took a job at The Scripps Research Institute.

Alvarez began taking classical ballet more seriously at the California Ballet. In 2005, Alvarez received a full merit scholarship to the Jacqueline Kennedy Onassis School at the American Ballet Theatre (ABT), and his family relocated to New York City. While at ABT, Alvarez danced feature roles in The Nutcracker at the Kennedy Center Opera House and The Sleeping Beauty at the Metropolitan Opera House. He continued his ballet training at ABT until 2012.

== Acting and dancing career ==
=== Billy Elliot ===
Alvarez is one of the three boys originally cast to play Billy in the Broadway production of Billy Elliot the Musical, along with Trent Kowalik and Kiril Kulish. He needed to study tap, acrobatics, voice and acting for the role and spent July 2007 through March 2008 preparing. Billy Elliot the Musical began performances on October 1, 2008, and Alvarez's first preview performance was on October 2. He played his final performance in the role on January 3, 2010.

Alvarez's portrayal of Billy Elliot was highly praised by the critics, including Ben Brantley and Claudia La Rocco of The New York Times and Charles McNulty of the Los Angeles Times. He was featured on Live with Regis and Kelly, The View, Sunday Morning on CBS News, The Today Show, Canada AM on CTV, CBC News, Despierta America on Univision, and at the 62nd Tony Awards ceremony.

Jointly with Kulish and Kowalik, Alvarez won the Tony Award for Best Actor in a Musical, becoming one of the youngest winners of the award. Billy Elliot was nominated for 15 Tony Awards, including Best Musical, and won ten.

Alvarez joined the cast of Billy Elliot: El Musical, a Spanish-language production of the musical in Mexico City. He was cast in the role of "Older Billy", which he played from February 10, 2017, to June 11, 2017.

=== Later work ===
Alvarez left theater to serve in the US Army. Following a service of two and a half years with the 25th Infantry Division he returned to Broadway, becoming a swing in a 2015 production of On the Town. In 2016 in Mexico, Alvarez danced the role of adult Billy in the dream ballet pas de deux between Billy and his older self.

Since 2021, Alvarez portrays Isaac English in Showtime's television series American Rust.

While attending Case Western Reserve University in Cleveland, Ohio, in 2018, he auditioned for Steven Spielberg's 2021 film version of West Side Story. He plays the role of Bernardo in this adaptation of the musical.

== Personal life ==
In 2008, Alvarez was listed as one of the top 10 young ballet dancers to watch by Dance Spirit magazine.

To complement his dancing and acting skills, Alvarez trained in classical piano at the 92nd Street Y School of Music, where he was awarded the Recanati-Kaplan merit scholarship.

== Filmography ==
=== Film ===
| Year | Title | Role | Notes |
|---|---|---|---|
| 2011 | S.W.A.T. | Chico V. | Short film |
| 2016 | We Regret to Inform You | The Deceased | Short film |
| 2021 | West Side Story | Bernardo | |
| 2021 | The Stamp Collector | Rhodes | Short film |
| 2024 | Blindspot | Ricardo | Short film |

=== Television ===
| Year | Title | Role | Notes |
|---|---|---|---|
| 2021–2024 | American Rust | Isaac English | 19 episodes |
| 2025 | Étoile | Gael Rodriguez | 8 episodes |
