= Pop It! =

- Country of origin: Canada
- Original language: English
- No. of episodes: 26

Production
- Running time: 7 minutes

Original release
- Release: 3 September 2007 – 2017

Pop It! is a Canadian children's television series on TVO teaching hip-hop dance. Designed to encourage children between the ages of 6 through 11 to exercise, the series was produced by Hop To It Productions with a grant from the Bell Fund. There are 26 episodes, each of which is 7 minutes long. The show first aired on September 3rd, 2007. The series is hosted by three dancers. Each episode features an original pop song, clips from music videos, and the three hosts teaching dance routines. The hosts included Briana Andrade-Gomes, Shemar Charles and Lamar Johnson.

The show was filmed at the IAOD studios in Toronto. It also aired on SCN in Saskatchewan and Access in Alberta..

== Staff ==
Hosts:

- Briana Andrade-Gomes
- Shemar Charles
- Lamar Johnson

== Awards and nominations ==
Year	Award	Category	Result
2009	ACT Awards of Excellence	Best Interstitials	Nominated
2009	ACT Awards of Excellence	Best Website	Nominated
2009	Gemini Award	Best Cross Platform Project	Nominated
