= Grandstreet Theatre =

Theater in Helena, Montana

Coordinates: 46.59022°N 112.0399°W

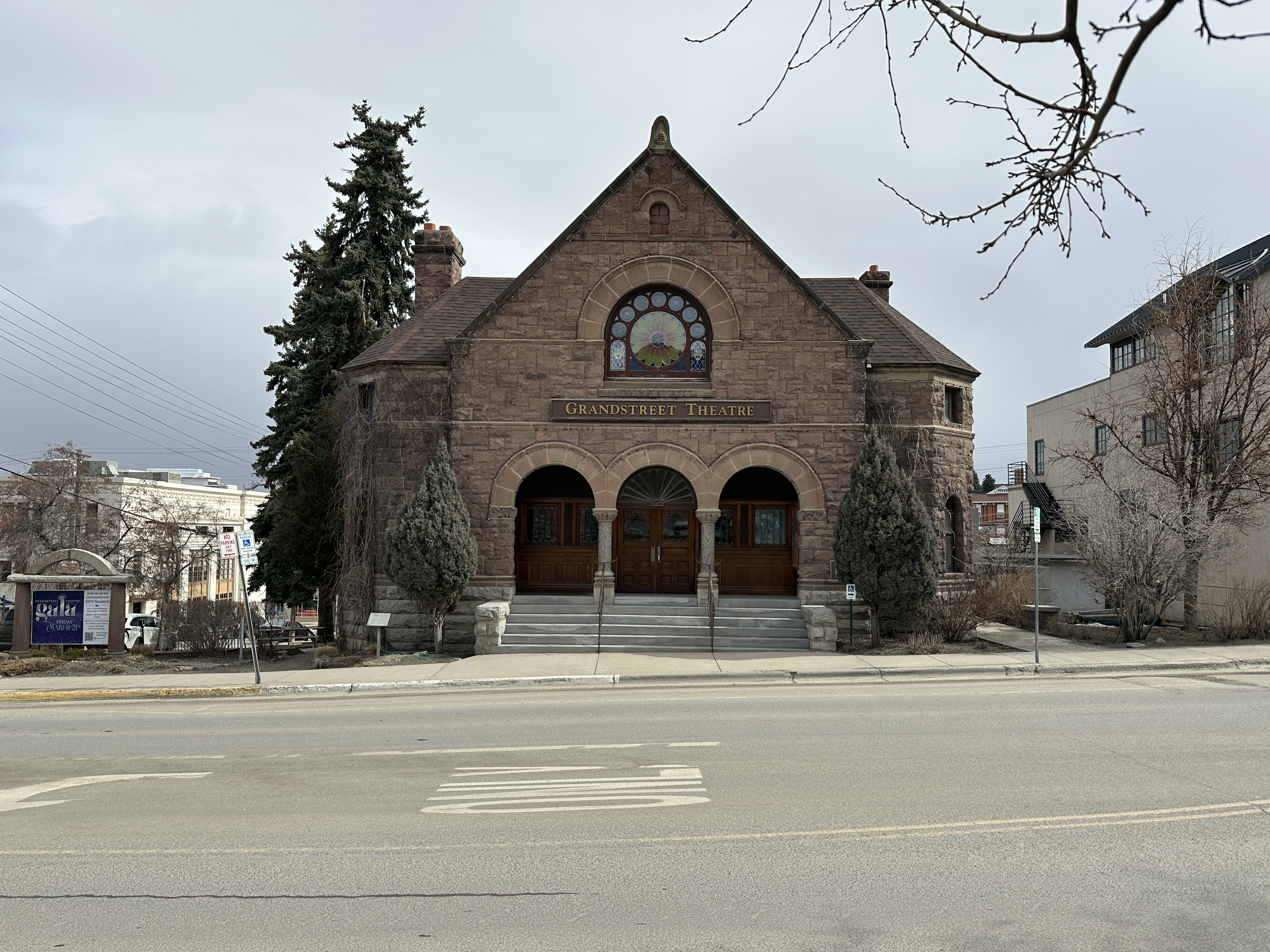

Grandstreet Theatre (GST) is a theatre in Helena, Montana. It is one of Montana's largest theatres. Located in historic downtown Helena, the community theatre presents several plays, musicals, and youth extravaganzas each year. Founded in 1975, "GST" remains a cornerstone for entertainment and education in Montana's capital city. Around 20,000 people attend performances each year. The estimated economic impact of the theatre for the area is $4,000,000 each year.

Grandstreet Theatre staff as of 2026 includes Managing Director Danielle Wineman, Artistic Director Jeff Downing, Director of Education Marianne Adams, and Technical Director Paige O'Neill.

== History ==
Carl Darchuck, a Montana native, returned to Helena at the invitation of John Wheeler in May, 1975 to investigate the potential for starting a community theater in Helena, much as he did in Fort Peck, Montana, Tacoma and Port Townsend, Washington. For a year, the theatre was located on Grand Street and Last Chance Gulch, in the ballroom of the historic Placer Hotel. In August, 1976, Grand Street Theatre (still three words then) was invited to move into its current space, a beautiful stone building designed originally as Unitarian church and serving as the Helena Public Library from 1933 until 1976. Since the move, the original avenue of Grand Street was demolished, and Grandstreet became one word.

The Theatre has flourished under the guidance of several skilled directors, notably Don McLaughlin, who served for fourteen years, leaving in August, 1993. Later Artistic Directors include Jerry Morrison, Blair Bybee, and Stephen Alexander. Grandstreet Theatre produces seven to ten productions a year, including comedies, dramas and musicals - all the best titles.

During the McLaughlin years, Don's wife Janet, began the Grandstreet Theatre School. Now run by Marianne Adams, Theatre School offers school-year classes of a wide variety, and the celebrated Summer Theatre School. Adams also coordinated the Summer Conservatory, bringing burgeoning artists from across the country to the picturesque locale for rousing Summer Stock.

== Building ==
Built as a Unitarian Church in 1901, the facility included the sloping floor and the proscenium stage area of today. Even then, early church documents indicated it was intended as a multi-use facility. The Reverend Leslie Willis Sprague idea for the building: "...nor do I believe God wants churches that are too holy for usefulness in any cause, even for the entertainment and pastime of His children...."

In 1933, an earthquake destroyed Helena's main public library. The church was donated to the City of Helena in memory of Ellen Dean for use as an interim library following the near destruction of the original facility by earthquakes. Renovations were made to the building by leveling the house floor and adding a mezzanine.

In 1976, Grand Street Theatre (dba Broadwater Productions) assumed occupancy and transformed the building into Helena's full-time, year-round community theater. Its former elegance was restored thanks to a Historic Preservation Award in May, 1996. Carl Darchuck oversaw such projects as restoring the original sloped audience floor, the removal of the temporary mezzanine, putting back in the balcony, and protecting its priceless 1910 Tiffany window. The final piece of restoration came with the discovery of the 1901 blueprints of the spectacular stained glass frieze. Under the direction of Tom Cordingley, it was painstakingly reproduced, with the addition of the comedy and tragedy theatre masks.
