= Trent Kowalik =

American actor, dancer, and singer (born 1995)

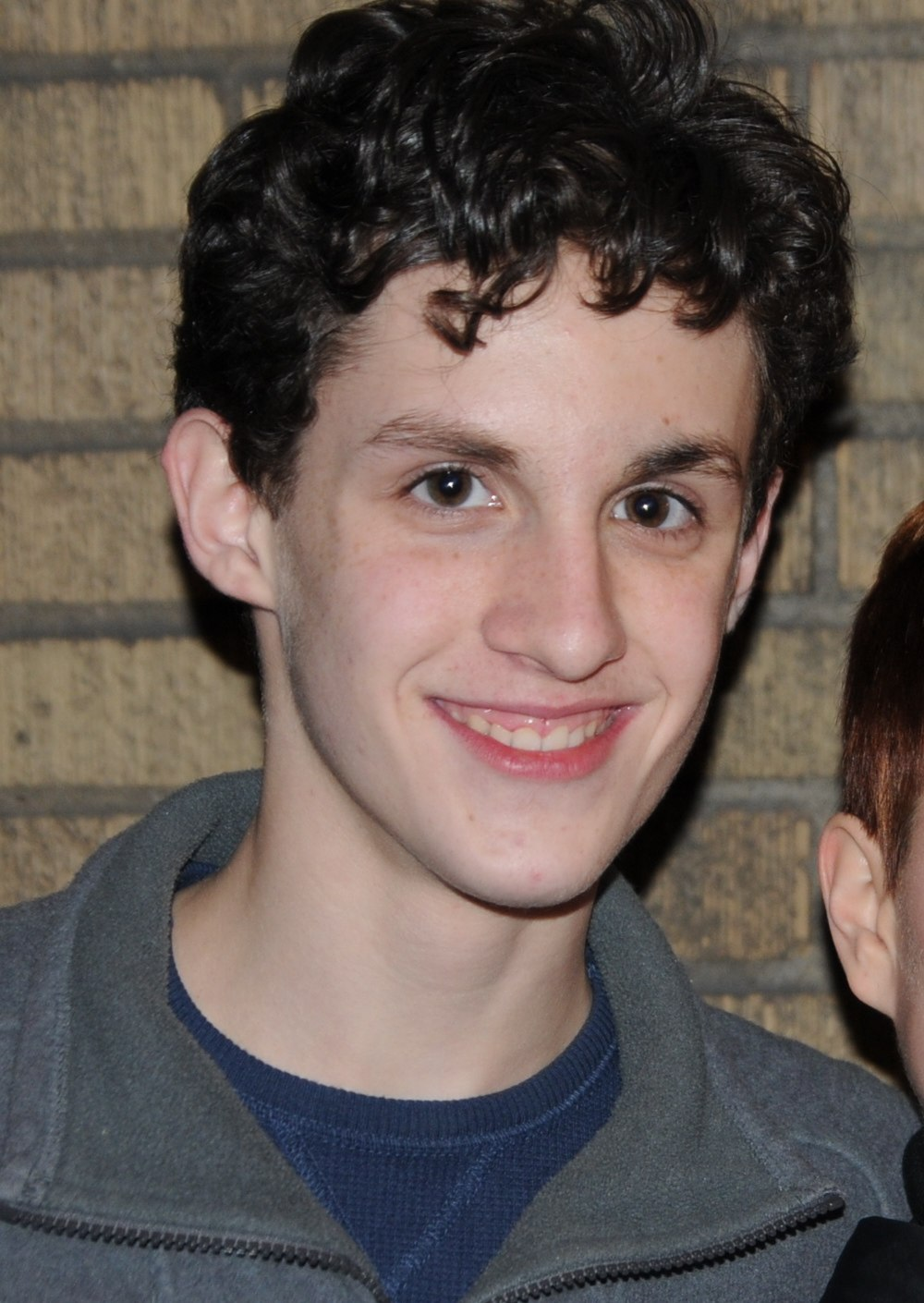
- Kowalik in 2012.
- Born: February 22, 1995 (age 31); Wantagh, New York, United States
- Occupations: Actor; dancer; singer
- Years active: 2007–present
- Website: http://www.trentkowalik.com

Trent Matthias Kowalik (born February 22, 1995) is an American actor, singer, dancer, and music producer. After making his theatrical debut as Billy in 2007 in the West End production of Billy Elliot the Musical, he went on to co-originate the same role in the 2008 Broadway production. Along with the two other boys playing Billy, he earned a Tony Award for Best Actor in a Leading Role in a Musical, becoming the youngest winner in that category.

== Early life and education ==
Kowalik was born in Wantagh, New York, the son of Lauretta (née Splescia), an organist and pianist at St. Raphael's Roman Catholic Church in East Meadow, New York, and Michael Kowalik, a surveyor. He has three older sisters. He started dance lessons at the age of three at Dorothy's School of Dance in Bellmore, New York. At age four, he began instruction in Irish dancing. At age six, he was competing at the highest level, Open Championship. He danced with the Inishfree School of Irish Dance.

In April 2006, at age 11, Kowalik won the youngest male age group of the World Irish Dancing Championship (Irish: Oireachtas Rince na Cruinne) in Belfast. He is a five-time undefeated North American Champion and a World Champion. He holds multiple national titles in Scotland, England, and Ireland, and continues to study ballet, tap, jazz, and lyrical dance. He graduated from The Jacqueline Kennedy Onassis School–Pre-Professional Division American Ballet Theatre in 2013. He graduated from Princeton University in June 2018. He was a member of student dance groups Princeton University Ballet and BodyHype Dance Company.

== Acting career ==
On December 17, 2007, Kowalik made his debut as Billy in Billy Elliot the Musical at the Victoria Palace Theatre in London. His final London show was on June 7, 2008.

Kowalik was announced as one of the three boys to play Billy in the Broadway production of the show at a New York press launch on April 22, 2008, along with David Álvarez and Kiril Kulish. Kowalik, in a reprise of his role as Billy, made his Broadway debut on October 8, 2008. His final performance in New York was on March 7, 2010.

On June 7, 2009, Alvarez, Kowalik, and Kulish won the Tony Award for Best Actor in a Leading Role in a Musical, becoming one of the youngest winners of the award. This marked the first to date occurrence of the award being given to more than one performer in the same year. He performed "Angry Dance" as the Billy representative from the show. This production of Billy Elliot was nominated for 15 Tony awards in all, including Best Musical, and won 10.

== Theatre credits ==
| Year | Title | Role | Notes |
|---|---|---|---|
| 2007–2010 | Billy Elliot: The Musical | Billy | Victoria Palace Theatre; Imperial Theatre |
