= Kiril Kulish =

American actor, dancer, and singer (born 1994)

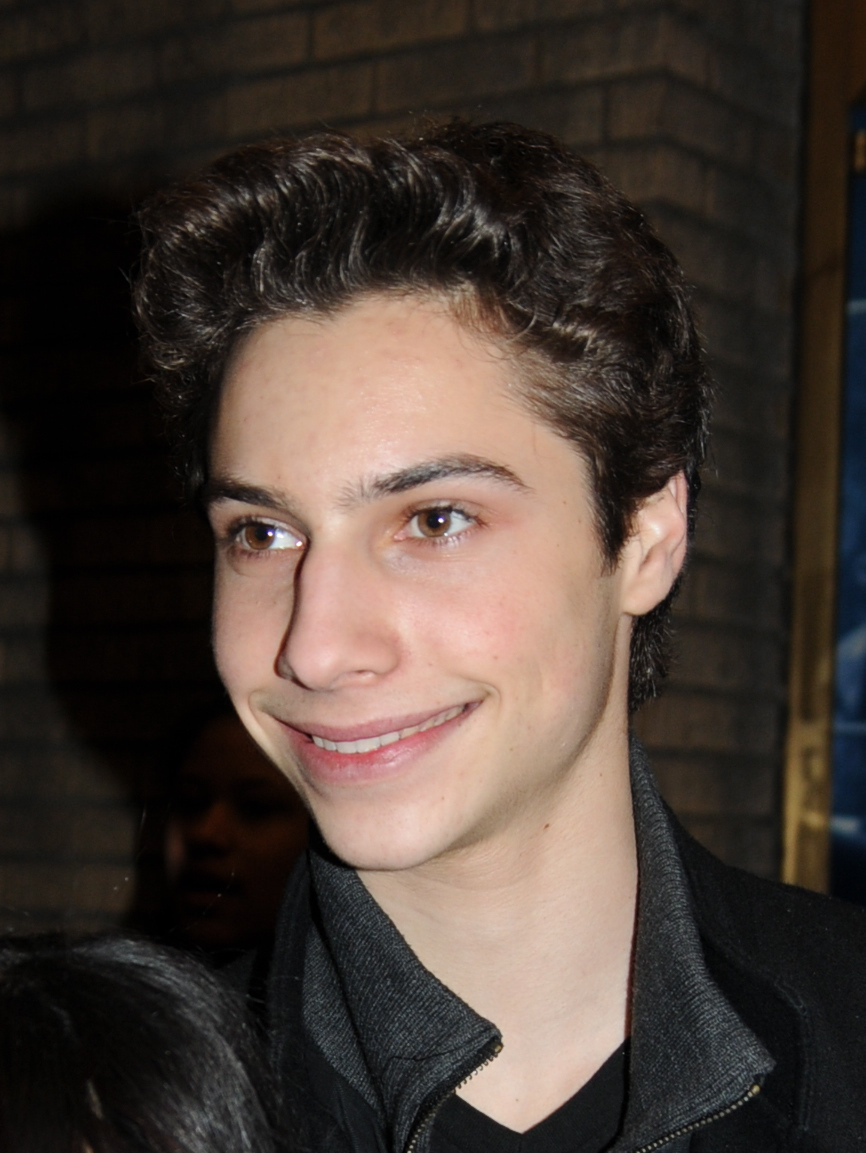
- Kulish in 2012
- Born: Kiril Jacob Kulish; February 16, 1994 (age 32); San Diego, California, U.S.
- Occupations: Actor; dancer; singer
- Years active: 2008–present
- Website: KirilKulish.com

Kiril Jacob Kulish (born February 16, 1994) is an American actor, singer and dancer who is best known for portraying the title role in the original American production of Billy Elliot the Musical, which earned him a Tony Award for Best Actor in a Musical, making him one of the youngest winners of the award.

== Early and personal life ==
Kulish was born in San Diego, California, on February 16, 1994. His parents, Raisa Kulish and Phil Axelrod, are Jewish immigrants from Ukraine. His older brother, Victor, is a singer/songwriter and recording engineer, and his older sister Beata is a TV/film producer. He grew up speaking Russian, Ukrainian, and English. He started studying ballet at age five and ballroom dancing at age 8. He studied at the San Diego Academy of Ballet, and was the youngest male to be admitted to their junior company. Kiril was the winner of the Junior division Grand Prix at the Youth America Grand Prix in 2006, 2007, and 2008 and won the Hope Award in the Pre-Competitive division in 2006. Kiril Kulish won first place in Latin Ballroom at the USA National Dance Championships in 2006 and 2007. In 2012 and 2013 Kiril Kulish became the Youth USA Champion in Latin Dance Sport and will represent USA in Beijing and Paris.

== Acting career ==
=== Billy Elliot the Musical ===
At a press launch in New York on April 22, 2008, it was announced that Kulish would be one of three boys to play the title role in the original Broadway production of Billy Elliot the Musical, along with David Álvarez and Trent Kowalik. Kulish performed in the musical's first preview performance on October 1, 2008. On June 7, 2009, Kulish, along with Trent Kowalik and David Álvarez, won the Tony Award for Best Actor in a Musical, becoming one of the youngest winners of the award. In all, Billy Elliot was nominated for 15 Tony Awards, and won 10, including Best Musical and Best Book of a Musical. Kulish's last performance in Billy Elliot was on Saturday October 3, 2009.

=== Later Work ===
Film: Sonata (Pre-Production) Landon Goldberg

Crossing Young Andrei

Damaged Brad

Choreographer

Chasing Mem’ries Musical at the Geffen Playhouse starring Tyne Daly and Robert Forster

Television:

Dancing with the Stars Pro

HBO Anthology Series Secret Service Style Agent-Co Star

The 63rd Annual Tony Awards Himself

Good Morning America Himself

NBC Sports Special Himself

ABC The View Billy Elliot

ABC Live with Regis and Kelly Himself

ABC Live with Regis and Michael Himself

CBS Morning Show Himself

ABC Daytime Salutes BC/EFA Himself (Full List Available upon request)

Theater/Performance: “Baz — A Musical Tour de Force” Las Vegas (Baz Lehrman show)

In late 2009, Kulish performed the lead role in the ballet The Nutcracker. In 2010, he attended the ballroom championship at USA Dance Southwest Regional Championship in Long Beach, CA. On October 27, 2012, Kiril performed alongside Jon Secada, Debbie Gravitte, Liz Callaway, and a host of award-winning singers from around the world in Loving the Silent Tears: A New Musical at the Shrine Theater in Los Angeles. In 2016, Kulish joined season 22 of Dancing with the Stars as a professional dancer in their troupe. Kulish currently resides in San Diego, Los Angeles, and New York.

== Theatre credits ==
Year	Title	Role	Theatre	Note
1 October 2008- 3 October 2009	Billy Elliot: The Musical	Billy	Imperial Theatre	Broadway debut
2009 holiday season	The Nutcracker		Occidental Grand Aruba	Palm Beach
27 October 2012	Loving the Silent Tears		Shrine Auditorium	Los Angeles, California

== Accolades ==
Awards
Year	Award	Category	Role	Show	Result	Ref.
2009	Tony Award	Best Performance by a Leading Actor in a Musical	Billy Elliot	Billy Elliot the Musical	Won	
