= Strallen =

Strallen is a surname. Notable people with the surname include:

- Scarlett Strallen (born 1982), English actress
- Summer Strallen (born 1985), English actress
- Zizi Strallen (born 1990), English actress, singer, and dancer
