= Mary Poppins (character) =

Protagonist of the Mary Poppins book series

- Mary Poppins character
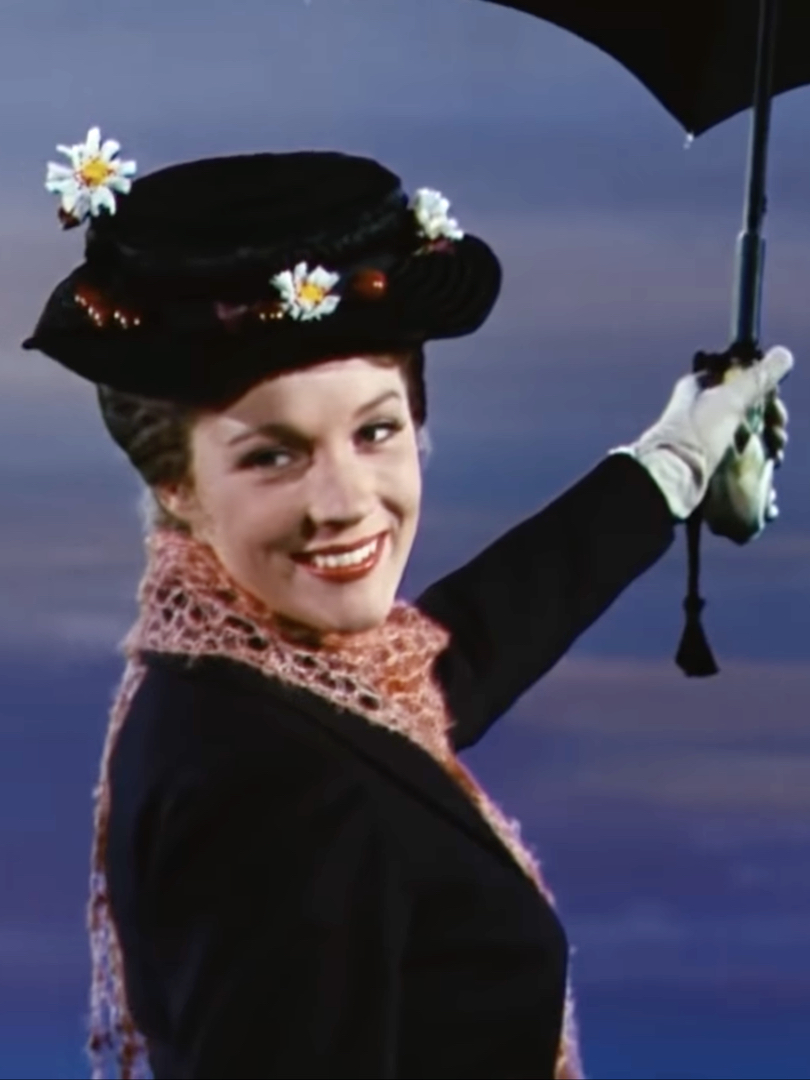
- Julie Andrews as Mary Poppins in the 1964 film
- First appearance: Mary Poppins and the Match Man (1926)
- Created by: P. L. Travers
- Portrayed by: Julie Andrews; Mary Wickes; Natalya Andreychenko; Emily Blunt; Other: Victoria Summer; Laura Michelle Kelly; Ashley Brown; Scarlett Strallen; Bianca Marroquín; Lisa O'Hare; Caroline Sheen; Linda Olsson; Rachel Wallace; Zizi Strallen
- Voiced by: Tatyana Voronina; Juliet Stevenson

In-universe information
- Occupation: Nanny
- Family: Mr. Twigley (uncle; novel canon); Albert (uncle; film canon); Topsy (cousin; film)
- Nationality: English

Mary Poppins is a fictional character and the protagonist of P. L. Travers' books of the same name along with all of their adaptations. A magical English nanny, she blows in on the east wind and arrives at the Banks home at Number Seventeen, Cherry Tree Lane, London, where she takes charge of the Banks children and teaches them valuable lessons with a magical touch. Travers gives Poppins the accent and vocabulary of a real London nanny: "cockney base notes overlaid with a strangled gentility".

Julie Andrews, who played the character in the 1964 film adaptation, received an Academy Award for Best Actress. British film magazine Empire included Poppins (as played by Andrews) in their 2011 list of 100 greatest movie characters. Acclaimed for her performance as Poppins in the 2018 sequel, Emily Blunt received a Golden Globe nomination for Best Actress in a Motion Picture – Comedy or Musical. In the 2004 musical adaptation in the West End, Laura Michelle Kelly received the Olivier Award for Best Actress in a Musical for her performance as Poppins.

== Description of character ==
A quintessential English nanny, Mary Poppins is a slightly stern but caring woman, who uses magic and self-control to take care of the Banks children. She is usually identifiable by her sensible hat and parrot umbrella, which she brings with her wherever she goes on outings; she also has the power to teleport to a place she wants. She is kind towards the children, but can be firm when needed. She is "practically perfect in every way". In the film version, she is a young woman, with an air of grace and elegance about her.

Author P. L. Travers was very firm about Mary Poppins' appearance in the novel's illustrations, working closely with illustrator Mary Shepard to create an image of the character. Eventually they based Mary Poppins' appearance on that of a Dutch doll: tall and bony, with short black hair, large blue eyes, a snub nose, and a prim, pursed mouth. Travers originally objected to the casting of Julie Andrews as Mary Poppins, claiming that Andrews was too attractive for the role; however, upon meeting Andrews in person for the first time, Travers allegedly examined the actress for a few moments before conceding, "Well, you've the nose for it."

=== Books ===
Mary Poppins as imagined by the illustrator of the book series, Mary Shepard, for the first volume

Mary Poppins in Travers' books is strict and takes no nonsense, asserting her unusual brand of discipline over the four (later five) Banks children in her charge. Mary is very vain and is always admiring herself in the mirror and other reflections. She constantly lectures the children for their "bad" behaviour, especially when they point out the magical things she does, for she constantly denies she is anything but a prim and proper lady. Mary only shows her gentler side around her friends, among them the Matchman (Bert), Mrs. Corry, and Nellie-Rubina.

Mary has many relatives, each with their own supernatural or otherwise eccentric nature, at least one of whom appears in each book. She appears to be well known to every sort of magical entity (sorcerers, talking animals, etc.) that appear in the books, some of whom love her dearly and others who are quite terrified of her. Some characters, most notably an impudent jackdaw seen in the first two books, call her "The Great Exception", meaning, among other things, that she is the only human being who has retained the magical secrets infants possess (such as the power to communicate with animals) until they grow up and forget about them. Some of her adventures occur in London, others in strange realms, which later writers might identify as magical dimensions. In literary terms, she might be described as a character who exists in every conceivable fantasy genre (gothic, mythic, urban, etc.) at once: there are many strange people and phenomena in the world, but only Mary Poppins is familiar with them all. In the first book, Poppins arrives at Number Seventeen Cherry Tree Lane, London, home of the Banks family, with her travelling carpet bag, having been blown in by the east wind. She departs when she opens her umbrella, and the west wind carries her away.

=== Disney films ===
Mary Poppins in the Disney film, as portrayed by Julie Andrews, is also fairly stern but at the same time more gentle, cheerful, and nurturing of the two Banks children. Mary also has a friendship with Bert (Dick Van Dyke), a jack-of-all-trades, who is quite at home with Mary's magic. She also is less vain and selfish (although there are a couple of references to her vanity when she replaces a dingy wall mirror with a more elegant one and sings a duet with her reflection), and far more sympathetic towards the two children than the nanny in the original stories. Emily Blunt portrayed Mary Poppins in the sequel Mary Poppins Returns.

=== Stage musical ===
"Even though it's set in Edwardian London, it's about family, and it's about appreciating one another. And that is kind of timeless, it's at the core of everyone's life to love and appreciate each other."

— Zizi Strallen (who plays Mary Poppins in the West End musical), speaking to the BBC in 2019.

In both the West End and Broadway versions of the stage musical, the Mary Poppins character is more deliberately mysterious than in the movie version. She is slightly stricter with the children (who are also naughtier than their book and movie counterparts), but only because she wants them to become the best they can be. Mary in the stage version is also more aware of Bert's feelings towards her.

== Development ==
Mary Poppins first appeared in the short story "Mary Poppins and the Match Man" in 1926 and in several early bits and pieces of the first novel. P. L. Travers later changed the story of the character's origins, stating that it appeared fully formed in her mind in 1934.

== Notable portrayals ==
- Julie Andrews in the 1964 Disney film and in all merchandise.
- Mary Wickes in the Studio One episode "Mary Poppins" in 1949.
- Natalya Andreychenko in the 1983 Soviet film Mary Poppins, Goodbye.
- Laura Michelle Kelly in the original West End and Broadway productions of the stage musical.
- Ashley Brown in the original Broadway and original US tour productions of the stage musical.
- Scarlett Strallen in the London and Broadway productions of the stage musical.
- Bianca Marroquín in the Mexican production of the stage musical.
- Lisa O'Hare in the London and UK tour production of the stage musical.
- Caroline Sheen in the original UK tour and US tour productions of the stage musical.
- Linda Olsson in the Swedish production of the stage musical.
- Verity Hunt-Ballard in the Australian production of the stage musical.
- Victoria Summer (as Julie Andrews) in Saving Mr. Banks.
- Zizi Strallen in the UK tour production of the stage musical and the 2019 West End revival in London.
- Emily Blunt in Mary Poppins Returns.

=== Voice ===
- Maggie Smith in a 1968 audio recording of dramatised readings with cast from the books. Fontana Special, SFL 14098 LP.
- Tatyana Voronina (singing) in the Soviet film Mary Poppins, Goodbye.
- Juliet Stevenson in the BBC Radio adaptation of the novel.
- Maggie Roswell in the Simpsons short May the 12th Be with You.

=== Parodies ===
- Anne Hathaway (in tribute to Julie Andrews) in a short parody sketch for the season 34, episode 4 of Saturday Night Live in 2008.
- Kristen Bell in a 2013 Funny or Die parody video, entitled Mary Poppins Quits.

== Additions ==
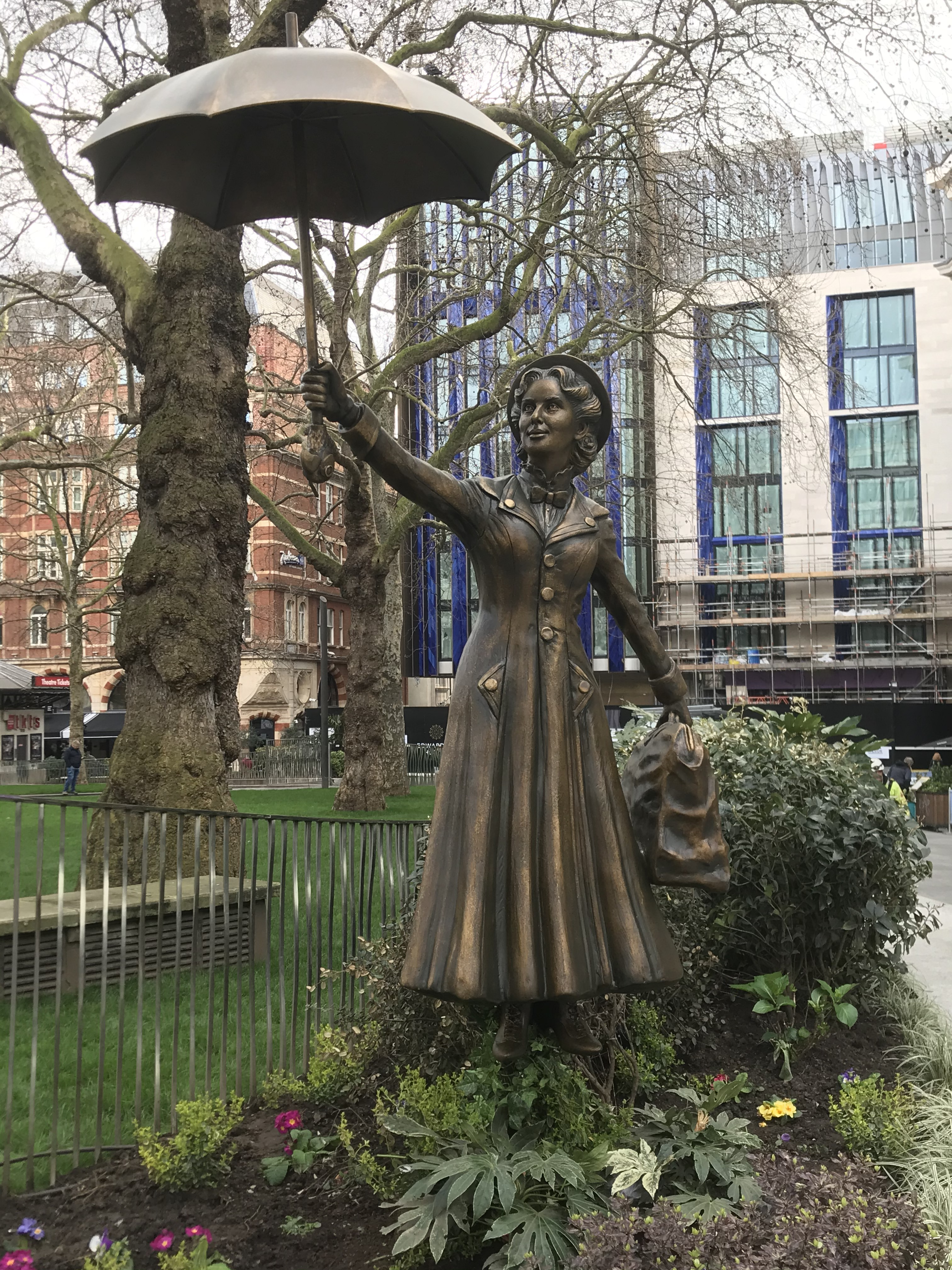
Mary Poppins statue in Leicester Square, London

Neil Gaiman's short story "The Problem of Susan" mentions a work published after Travers's death, Mary Poppins Brings in the Dawn, in which Mary Poppins was Jesus's nanny.

Mary Poppins appears in Alan Moore's third League of Extraordinary Gentlemen graphic novel, Black Dossier, when it returns to Margaret Cavendish's Blazing World. She later reappears in Century: 2009 and defeats the Antichrist created by Oliver Haddo. In this appearance, she and other characters hint that she may be a personification of God.

In a sequence celebrating British children's literature during the opening ceremony of the London 2012 Olympic Games, a group of over thirty Mary Poppinses with umbrellas descended en masse to fight and defeat the nightmares (the villains Queen of Hearts, Captain Hook, Cruella de Vil, and Lord Voldemort) haunting children's dreams. The sequence is called "Second to the right and straight on till morning".

Terry Pratchett's Susan Sto Helit character parodies Mary Poppins in various ways, most explicitly in the novel Hogfather.

In The Simpsons season 8 episode "Simpsoncalifragilisticexpiala(Annoyed Grunt)cious", Marge hires a new housekeeper for the family named Shary Bobbins (voiced by Maggie Roswell), who, though she attempts to help the Simpsons become better people, is ultimately driven to alcoholism.

In Family Guy season 6 episode "Padre de Familia", in a cutaway gag Peter dressed up as Mary Poppins he arrives to take care to Michael and Jane but only ends up killing them.

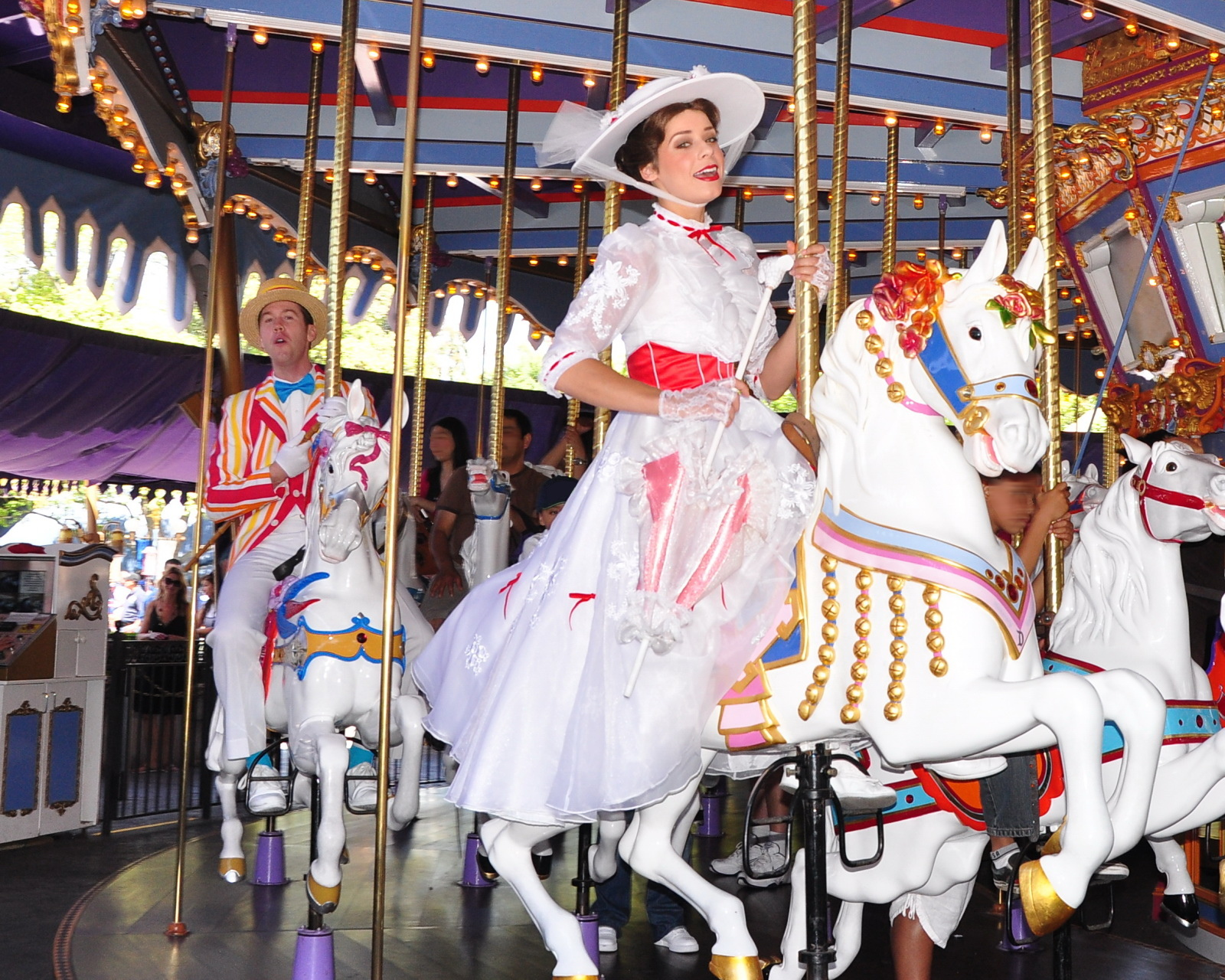
Mary Poppins on the King Arthur Carrousel in Disneyland.

Andy Weir's Cheshire Crossing depicts Miss Mary Poppins in 1910, prior to her employment to the Banks family, as she works as a tutor for Dr. Ernest Rutherford of Cheshire Crossing and is put in charge of Alice Liddell and Wendy Darling alongside her former student Dorothy Gale. Upon travelling to the land of Oz, Poppins is identified as a witch by the Wicked Witch of the West and melted with a bucket of water, before being reformed by Rutherford with a teaspoon of table sugar. In the 2017 physical graphic novel version of Cheshire Crossing, Poppins is renamed Gwendolyn Poole due to restrictions from P. L. Travers' estate, although she retains the Poppins name in the Tapas webcomic version. In the audio play adaptation, Poppins (as Poole) is voiced by Rebecca Soler.

Natalie Schafer (as Lovey Howell) plays a Mary Poppins-like character named Mary Poppedin in a dream sequence of the Gilligan's Island episode "And Then There Were None".

In Guardians of the Galaxy Vol. 2, Peter Quill/Star Lord compares Yondu to Mary Poppins at the climax, leading to him (who does not know the character) proudly proclaiming "I'm Mary Poppins, y'all!" as he saves Star-Lord from dying in the vacuum of space.

In The Lego Movie 2: The Second Part, a character named Larry Poppins (voiced by Jorma Taccone) is Mary Poppins' male counterpart.

Due to the phenomenal success of the 1964 film, Mary Poppins makes regular appearances at all the Disney Parks and Resorts. She is always accompanied by Bert and is located in the Main Street, U.S.A. area of the parks. Mary Poppins and the Pearly band also perform. She can also be found at the United Kingdom Pavilion of the World Showcase in Epcot at Walt Disney World.

A slasher villain take on Mary Poppins, depicted as a "child snatcher" based on her 1926 story's public domain entry in 2022, is set to appear in The Twisted Childhood Universe film Poohniverse: Monsters Assemble. She will serve as one of the film's primary evils, alongside Peter Pan and the Mad Hatter.
