= Caroline Sheen =

Welsh actress

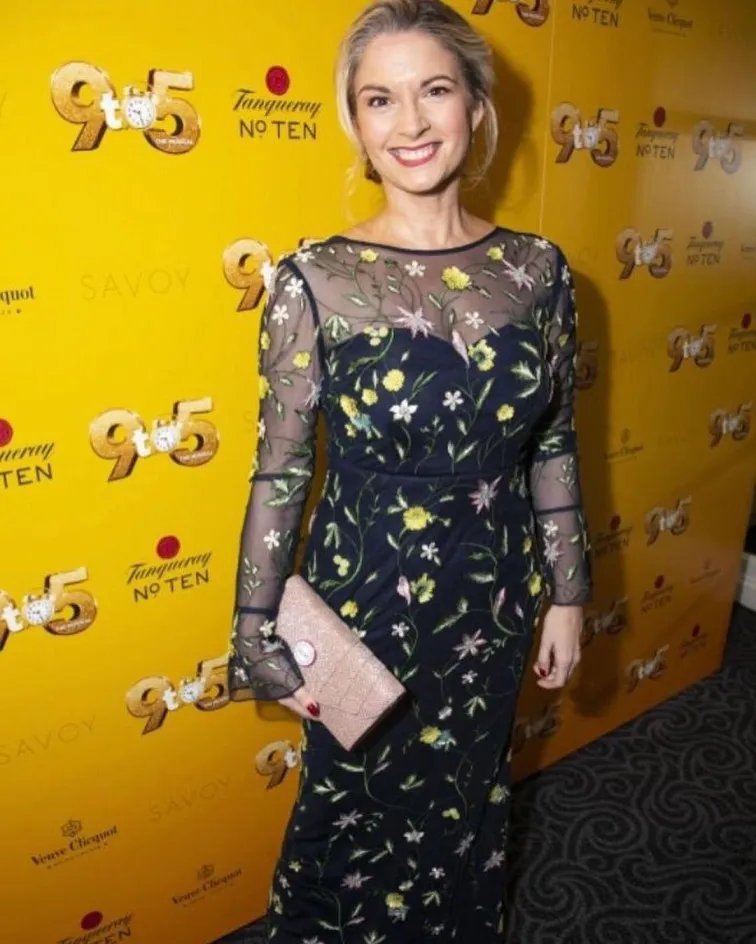
- Sheen at the opening night of 9 to 5 The Musical in February 2019
- Born: 7 January 1976 (age 50); Caerleon, Wales
- Education: Guildford School of Acting (BA Hons)
- Occupation: Actress
- Spouse: Michael Jibson (m. 2007)
- Children: 1

Caroline Sheen (born 7 January 1976) is a Welsh actress who has played leading roles on stage in the West End alongside TV and film appearances. She won a Helen Hayes award for playing the role of Mary Poppins on the National Tour of America.

== Background ==
Born and raised in South Wales, Sheen is married to actor Michael Jibson. She is a cousin of Michael Sheen. A member of the National Youth Theatre of Wales and Gwent Young People's Theatre, she graduated from the Guildford School of Acting with 1st Class B.A. Honours, and was named as an Associate Artist of the Watermill Theatre in 2018. Sheen is also an Honorary Fellow of the University of South Wales.

== Career ==
Sheen made her West End debut as Marty in Grease at the Cambridge Theatre. She went on to play Florinda in Into the Woods at the Donmar Warehouse and then went into the original cast of Mamma Mia! at the Prince Edward Theatre, understudying the lead role of Sophie. She created the role of Jennifer Gabriel in the world premiere production of The Witches of Eastwick at the Theatre Royal Drury Lane. Other West End credits include Eponine in Les Misérables at the Palace Theatre, Sandy in Grease at the Victoria Palace, and Truly Scrumptious in Chitty Chitty Bang Bang at the London Palladium Work at the National Theatre includes Philia in A Funny Thing Happened on the Way to the Forum', Susan Walker in Once in a Lifetime Caroline played Mary Poppins in the UK Tour of the Cameron Mackintosh/Disney production. Caroline created the role of Clara Johnson in the European Premiere of The Light in the Piazza at Curve Theatre in Leicester. Sheen reprised her role as Mary Poppins in the US Tour of Mary Poppins. She returned to the UK in the role of Fantine in Les Misérables at the Queens Theatre, following that with Woman 2 in the London Premiere of Stephen Sondheim's Putting It Together at the St James Theatre. Sheen stepped in at last minute to play the roles of Alaura/Carla on several occasions in the Donmar Warehouse production of City of Angels. More recent work includes leading roles in Crazy for You and Under Milk Wood both at the Watermill Theatre, and Lilli/Kate in Kiss Me Kate at Kilworth House. In 2019, Sheen created the leading role of Violet Newstead in the West End Premiere of 9 to 5 at the Savoy Theatre. During the 2020 pandemic, Sheen and her husband Michael Jibson played opposite each other as Guinevere and Arthur in an outdoor production of Camelot back at the Watermill Theatre. In 2024, she returned to the Savoy Theatre as a standby to Sarah Jessica Parker in Plaza Suite by Neil Simon.

TV work includes Hotel Babylon, Doctors and Torchwood. Queen Elizabeth of York in the Channel 4 documentary Henry VIII, Mind of a Tyrant. In 2018, Sheen appeared in episodes of Press and The Rook, and starred in the leading role of Carys in Pitching In for the BBC. In 2021 she appeared as DI Meredith Hughes in Silent Witness. In 2022 she appeared as Claire in series 4 of Ghosts. In 2023, she played the recurring guest role of Beverly Munroe in the BBC soap opera Doctors, as well as appearing in Sister Boniface Mysteries.

In 2026, she appeared in Ted Lasso as Bunny, the mother of injured striker Gemma Jay.

Film work includes Les Miserables (2012), Nativity Rocks, and Four Kids and It (2020).

== Recordings ==
In February 2010, Sheen released her debut album Raise the Curtain, a selection of songs by leading contemporary musical theatre writers from Britain and America; featuring 5 previously unrecorded songs, including a cut song from The Witches of Eastwick; alongside songs from The Light in the Piazza, Just So, Grey Gardens, and Mary Poppins. Sheen can also be heard on the original cast recordings of Mamma Mia!, The Witches of Eastwick, Rosemary Ashe's album Serious Cabaret and A Spoonful of Stiles and Drewe. In 2016, BEFORE AFTER was released, a recording of a new musical featuring Sheen and Hadley Fraser. In 2020, the 9 to 5: The Musical London cast album was released in which she features as Violet Newstead, the role she created in London.

== Other performances ==
Sheen was a guest soloist in the opening ceremony of the Wales Millennium Centre. Other solo concert work includes Night of a Thousand Voices at the Royal Albert Hall, Michael Ball and Friends at the Royal Opera House, An Evening with Jason Robert Brown, and Georgia Stitt and Friends. She appeared alongside fellow Mary Poppins actresses Lisa O'Hare and Scarlett Strallen in A Spoonful of Stiles and Drewe singing a specially devised version of "Practically Perfect".

On 9 February 2020 she interviewed Stephen Schwartz at the JW3 in London.
