= A Gentleman's Guide to Love and Murder =

2012 American musical comedy

A Gentleman's Guide to Love & Murder
- Promotional Poster
- Music: Steven Lutvak
- Lyrics: Robert L. Freedman; Steven Lutvak
- Book: Robert L. Freedman
- Basis: Israel Rank: The Autobiography of a Criminal by Roy Horniman
- Productions: 2012 Hartford; 2013 Broadway; 2015 US tour 2017 US tour
- Awards: Tony Award for Best Musical; Tony Award for Best Book of a Musical

A Gentleman's Guide to Love & Murder is a musical comedy with music by Steven Lutvak, lyrics by Lutvak and Robert L. Freedman, and a book by Freedman. It is based on the 1907 fictional novel Israel Rank: The Autobiography of a Criminal by Roy Horniman.

The show opened on Broadway at the Walter Kerr Theatre November 17, 2013, running until January 17, 2016. The Broadway production won four Tony Awards at the 68th Tony Awards in June 2014, including Best Musical.

The novel was also the source for the 1949 British film Kind Hearts and Coronets, with which it shares the conceit of casting one actor as an entire family; however, after a lengthy legal battle, the infringement claim from the film's copyright holder was dismissed. An early workshop of the show was presented in 2004 under the same title as the 1949 film.

== Productions ==
A Gentleman's Guide to Love and Murder premiered at the Hartford Stage, Hartford, Connecticut, running in October and November 2012, with direction by Darko Tresnjak. The cast featured Jefferson Mays, Ken Barnett and Lisa O'Hare. The show was a co-production of the Hartford Stage and the Old Globe Theatre.

The musical then played at the Old Globe Theatre, San Diego, California, in March 2013. Directed by Tresnjak, the cast again featured Mays, Barnett and O'Hare.

The musical opened on Broadway at the Walter Kerr Theatre on November 17, 2013, after beginning previews on October 22, 2013. Directed by Tresnjak and choreographed by Peggy Hickey, the production closed on January 17, 2016. The original cast featured Mays (who would stay with the production for its entire run), O'Hare, Lauren Worsham and Bryce Pinkham. Mays plays nine roles, all of the D'Ysquith family. Its capitalization was $7.5 million, and in April 2015 the producers announced the recoupment of the capitalization.

A U.S. national tour of the production opened in September 2015 at the Proctor's Theatre in Schenectady, New York, and closed in March 2017 at the Sacramento Community Center Theater. A second national tour opened in September 2017 at the Overture Center in Madison, Wisconsin, and closed in May 2018 at the Mother Lode Theatre in Butte, Montana.

An Australian production opened at the Arts Centre Melbourne for The Production Company in October 2018. It featured Mitchell Butel and Chris Ryan, and was directed by Roger Hodgman.

A French production opened at the Théâtre du Palais-Royal in August 2026. It featured Gaétan Borg and Benoît Cauden and was directed by Virginie Lemoine.

== Synopsis ==
=== Act I ===
A group dressed in mourning clothes enter and advise "those of you of weaker constitution" to leave the theater, as the show may prove disturbing ("Prologue: A Warning to the Audience").

In 1909, Lord Montague "Monty" D'Ysquith Navarro, Ninth Earl of Highhurst, is in jail. He says that he is writing his memoirs on the eve of his possible execution, and that his story could be called "A Gentleman's Guide to Love and Murder". He begins his story.

In 1907, Monty is living in a shabby Clapham flat and his mother, a washerwoman, has just died. Miss Marietta Shingle, a mysterious old woman, arrives to tell Monty that his mother was, in fact, a member of the aristocratic D'Ysquith family. Isabel D'Ysquith had eloped with a Castilian musician (now also deceased), which caused her family to disown her. Wishing to spare her son any shame, Isabel never told him the truth of his ancestry. Now, Miss Shingle says, Monty is ninth in line to inherit the earldom of Highhurst. She insists that he take his rightful place in the family ("You're A D'Ysquith"). Monty writes a letter to Lord Asquith D'Ysquith Sr., the head of the D'Ysquith family banking house, explaining his connection to the family and inquiring if there might be a job available for him.

Monty is in love with Miss Sibella Hallward, but she will not marry him due to his poverty ("I Don't Know What I'd Do"). Sibella has also drawn the attention of another gentleman of higher status, Lionel Holland. She dubiously accepts Monty's story about his lineage, but remarks that eight people would have to die in order for him to become earl.

Monty receives a reply from Lord Asquith's son, Asquith D'Ysquith Jr., denying Isabel's existence and warning Monty against contacting the family again or using their name. Monty is dejected, but refuses to accept his apparent destiny as a poor commoner ("Foolish to Think"). He takes a tour of Highhurst Castle, the D'Ysquiths' ancestral home, on Visitors Day, where the spirits of his D'Ysquith ancestors admonish him that he does not belong there ("A Warning to Monty"). Lord Adalbert D'Ysquith, the current Earl of Highhurst, catches Monty looking around the ancestral library and drives him out, expressing his disdain for the commoners flooding his home ("I Don't Understand the Poor").

Monty decides to try his luck with the clergyman in the family, a dithering old man named the Reverend Lord Ezekial D'Ysquith. Ezekial gives Monty a tour of the ancestral family church. He remembers Isabel as a charming girl who broke her father's heart, but refuses to advocate on Monty's behalf, believing that it is best to avoid family intrigue. Monty and Ezekial ascend the bell tower, where Ezekial nearly loses his balance, thanks to a gusty wind and his own inebriation. Monty realizes how easy it would be to let Ezekial fall, exacting revenge for his mother and bringing him one step closer to the earldom ("Foolish to Think (Reprise)"). Rather than assisting Ezekial to safety, Monty lets him fall to his death.

Monty returns to his dead-end job as a clerk, frustrated that he toils away while unworthy men grow rich, including Asquith D'Ysquith Jr. He observes Asquith Jr. and his mistress Miss Evangeline Barley, a recent Florodora girl, steal away to a winter resort. Monty follows them with the intention of poisoning Asquith Jr., but is unable to get close enough to deliver the poison. Asquith Jr. and Miss Barley go ice-skating on a frozen lake, and Monty is struck by inspiration. He cuts a hole in the ice, and the skaters fall through and drown ("Poison in My Pocket").

Monty returns to London and receives a letter from Lord Asquith D'Ysquith Sr., apologizing for the tone of his son's letter and inviting Monty to the bank to speak about a job. He is grief-stricken by his son's death in the skating "accident", and offers Monty a comfortable salary and a job as a stockbroker. Monty accepts.

Sibella informs Monty that she is engaged to marry Lionel Holland. Upon learning of Monty's new position and income, she begins to reconsider, but forces herself to go through with marrying Lionel ("Poor Monty").

Monty now fixes on his distant cousin Henry D'Ysquith, a country squire. He encounters Henry in a town pub and rescues him from an assault by a foreclosed-on tenant. Henry is married but clearly prefers the company of men; Monty picks up on this and befriends him ("Better With a Man"). Henry is also an avid beekeeper, and tells Monty that a person can be killed by an excess of bee-stings. Monty obtains a bottle of lavender perfume, to which bees are extraordinarily attracted. At the D'Ysquith country estate in Salisbury, Monty douses Henry's beekeeping clothes with the lavender before introducing himself to Henry's sister, Miss Phoebe D'Ysquith. As she and Monty discover their similarities, Henry is stung to death ("Inside Out"). Monty consoles Phoebe, and concludes that since he cannot be with Sibella, she would be the perfect woman to be his countess when he becomes earl. As a woman of his own generation, she does not stand before him in the line of succession, and she is highly sympathetic to the plight of his mother.

There are other women who do come before Monty in the lineage, including Lady Hyacinth D'Ysquith, an unmarried woman of a certain age, who devotes herself to philanthropic causes, primarily with the aim of bolstering her own social position. Posing as a member of the Foreign Office, Monty encourages Lady Hyacinth to travel first to war-torn Egypt, then to the Punjab (during a malaria pandemic) to establish a leper colony, in order to dispose of her. She returns unharmed both times, before Monty sends her to an African jungle where a cannibal tribe lives. Lady Hyacinth is reported missing and presumed dead ("Lady Hyacinth Abroad").

Monty proves a talented stockbroker, securing a significant salary increase and praise from Lord Asquith D'Ysquith Sr. ("The Last One You'd Expect - Part I"). His romance with Sibella continues despite her marriage and it is clear that she is impressed by Monty's determination to succeed ("The Last One You'd Expect - Part III").

Monty's next target is Major Lord Bartholomew D'Ysquith, a staunch eugenicist, vegetarian and bodybuilder. Monty encounters Lord Bartholomew at a weight-lifting hall and charms his way into acting as the major's spotter on the bench-press apparatus. Pretending to misunderstand his cries for help, Monty adds more weight than Bartholomew can hold, and then allows the barbell to fall and decapitate him.

Monty continues to console Phoebe; actions that during her period of mourning for her brother have endeared him to her greatly (“The Last One You'd Expect - Part V").

Lady Salome D'Ysquith Pumphrey is an appallingly bad actress currently starring in a production of Henrik Ibsen's Hedda Gabler. Remembering that the play ends with Hedda's suicide by a pistol shot to the head, Monty sneaks backstage and loads the prop gun with real bullets. Lady Salome shoots herself and dies, to the shock of her fellow actors and the approval of the audience.

The deaths of the Reverend Lord Ezekial, Asquith Jr., Henry, Lady Hyacinth, Major Lord Bartholomew, and Lady Salome now leave only two D'Ysquiths in the way: the present earl Lord Adalbert, and Lord Asquith Sr., Monty's employer and benefactor. Monty is suddenly conflicted, finding he has no desire to murder the kindly Lord Asquith, but is let off the hook when the old man suddenly succumbs to a heart attack ("The Last One You'd Expect - Part VIII"). As Lord Adalbert realizes that there is no one left between him and Monty, all of London is abuzz over the dashing young gentleman who's risen so far, so fast, and now stands next in line to inherit Highhurst ("The Last One You'd Expect - Part IX").

=== Act II ===
The curtain rises on Lord Asquith Sr.'s funeral. Monty delivers a stirring eulogy, but the assembled mourners are irritated at the endless string of D'Ysquith memorials they are compelled to attend ("Why Are All the D'Ysquiths Dying?"). Lord Adalbert worries that the curse that has fallen upon his family may strike him next ("Why Are All the D'Ysquiths Dying? (Reprise)").

Monty and Sibella continue their affair; he continues to love her despite his awareness of her flaws ("Sibella"). Sibella says that while she is unhappy with Lionel, she doesn't necessarily regret marrying for self-interest, and wouldn't begrudge Monty for doing the same. However, she would "forbid" him to marry for love. She also asks if Monty can secure Lionel an invitation to Highhurst, as he has political aspirations. Phoebe unexpectedly arrives, and Sibella hides in the next room. Phoebe declares her intention to marry Monty, even if the D'Ysquiths would look down on them. Monty accepts, but knows he is caught both figuratively and literally between the two women ("I've Decided to Marry You").

Monty is shocked to discover that Lady Hyacinth has survived her encounter with the cannibals and is returning to London. As she disembarks the ship, Monty uses an axe to cut the supports of the gangplank. It collapses, and she drowns in the harbor.

Monty, Phoebe, Sibella, and Lionel are all invited to Highhurst for the weekend, so that Lord Adalbert can meet his heir. Monty and Phoebe arrive first, and meet the earl and his wife, Lady Eugenia D'Ysquith. The spirits of the D'Ysquith ancestors again warn Monty against presuming above his station ("Final Warning"). A long-brewing enmity between Lord Adalbert and Lady Eugenia is evident, and Adalbert makes several crass remarks about the scandal caused by Monty's mother. He and Monty head off to look at "some of the weapons that killed our ancestors" as Sibella arrives without Lionel, who's been called away for urgent business. Phoebe and Monty's engagement is news to Sibella. She begs him to break it off and declares that she loves him. Although he still loves her, he angrily replies that it is too late for her to claim ownership of him and that he will proceed with marrying Phoebe.

At dinner, a truly awful meal is served, and Lord Adalbert and Lady Eugenia bicker constantly. Monty has brought along poison, intending to slip it into Lord Adalbert's food, but cannot do so unnoticed or risking poisoning someone else by mistake ("Poison in My Pocket (Reprise)"). Miss Shingle, who initially brought Monty the news of his true lineage, appears; it turns out that she's been employed as a servant by the D'Ysquiths for 39 years.

At last, Monty slips poison into Lord Adalbert's dessert, but to his horror, the earl refuses it, insisting Sibella eat it instead; Monty desperately knocks it to the floor. A drunken Lord Adalbert starts to tell the story of how he was betrayed by his valet during the Boer War ("Looking Down the Barrel of a Gun"). He gives Monty his loaded army rifle, and demands that he play the part of the valet, ordering Monty to aim the gun at him. Monty cannot bring himself to shoot the earl, and lowers the gun, his opportunity lost. Lord Adalbert takes a drink and, to Monty's surprise, suddenly drops dead.

With Lord Adalbert's death, Monty is now Lord Montague D'Ysquith Navarro, Ninth Earl of Highhurst. He and Phoebe marry soon after. However, at the wedding reception, Chief Inspector Pinckney of Scotland Yard arrests him for the murder of Lord Adalbert, who, it has been discovered, was indeed poisoned. Monty remarks on the absurdity of being charged with the one murder he didn't actually commit ("Stop! Wait! What?!").

A trial is held before the House of Lords, and evidence is given to both implicate and exculpate Monty. Sibella testifies on Monty's behalf, but, in a fit of passion, gives evidence that bolsters the prosecution's alleged motive for the crime: that the D'Ysquiths disinherited his mother and denied his existence.

On the evening before the jury is to render judgment, Monty is writing his memoirs in his cell and strikes up a conversation with the jail's custodian, Chauncey. It turns out that Chauncey is a D'Ysquith too, his father having been a black sheep of the family, cast out in a manner similar to Isabel. Chauncey says he doesn't mind having not been acknowledged - he has none of the advantages of the D'Ysquiths, but none of their troubles either. Moved by the encounter, Monty shakes the hand of his last remaining relation.

Convinced of Monty's innocence, Phoebe visits him in jail. They conclude that an unseen providence is watching over him, but Phoebe has one important question to ask him: is Sibella in love with him? She takes his silence as an answer, and departs. Monty concludes his memoir, saying that the outcome will be revealed in the morning with the jury's verdict.

Sibella arrives at the jail with a letter, purportedly from Phoebe and addressed to Monty, confessing to poisoning the earl so that Monty could take his rightful place. Phoebe returns to the jail with another letter, this one apparently from Sibella and also addressed to Monty, confessing the same thing. Both women plead for the other to be arrested and Monty set free. The authorities decide that both women appear equally culpable, and they can't convict one woman if they believe the other one guilty. Phoebe and Sibella have also provided reasonable doubt as to Monty's guilt. It becomes apparent to the audience that the two women have thus conspired to prevent Monty's conviction and execution ("That Horrible Woman").

Monty is awakened and, to his great surprise, set free. Cheering crowds greet him outside. Phoebe and Sibella are there, evidently content to share him between them. Monty suddenly panics realizing that he's left his memoirs, which contain a full confession, in his cell. However, a guard hands Monty the journal, saying he found it and thought Monty might need it. Reeling from this one last stroke of luck, Monty wonders who poisoned the earl, if he didn't. Miss Shingle appears, and confesses to the audience that it was she who slipped prussic acid into the earl's port. In the final moments of the show, the company sing "this is not the end", and Chauncey appears, holding a small bottle of poison, singing "Poison in My Pocket," implying that he will use it on Monty ("Finale").

After the curtain call, Monty hands Chauncey a poisonous belladonna flower. Chauncey eats it, grimaces, and exits the stage.

== Musical numbers ==
Act I

- "Prologue: A Warning to the Audience" - Mourners
- "You're a D'Ysquith" – Miss Shingle and Monty
- "I Don't Know What I'd Do" – Sibella
- "Foolish to Think" – Monty
- "A Warning to Monty" – Paintings
- "I Don't Understand the Poor" – Lord Adalbert and Paintings
- "Foolish to Think (Reprise)" – Monty and Lord Ezekial
- "Poison in My Pocket" – Monty, Asquith Jr., and Miss Barley
- "Poor Monty" – Sibella and Wedding Guests
- "Better With a Man" – Henry and Monty
- "Inside Out" – Phoebe and Monty
- "Lady Hyacinth Abroad" – Lady Hyacinth, Monty and Ensemble
- "The Last One You'd Expect" – Company

Act II

- "Why Are All the D'Ysquiths Dying" – Mourners
- "Why Are All The D'Ysquiths Dying (Reprise)" – Lord Adalbert and Paintings
- "Sibella" – Monty
- "I've Decided to Marry You" – Phoebe, Sibella, and Monty
- "Final Warning" – Statue Busts
- "Poison in My Pocket (Reprise)" - Monty
- "Looking Down the Barrel of a Gun" – Lord Adalbert and Servants
- "Stop! Wait! What?!" – Monty and Inspector Pinckney
- "That Horrible Woman" – Sibella, Phoebe, Inspector Pinckney, Magistrate, and Guard
- "Finale" – Company

== Casts ==
Principal casts of all professional major productions.

Role	Hartford	Broadway	First National Tour	Second National Tour
Role	2012	2013	2015	2017
Monty Navarro	Ken Barnett	Bryce Pinkham	Kevin Massey	Blake Price
The D'Ysquith Family	Jefferson Mays	Jefferson Mays	John Rapson	James Taylor Odom
Sibella Hallward	Lisa O'Hare	Lisa O'Hare	Kristen Beth Williams	Colleen McLaughlin
Phoebe D'Ysquith	Chilina Kennedy	Lauren Worsham	Adrienne Eller	Erin McIntyre
Miss Marietta Shingle	Rachel Izen	Jane Carr	Mary VanArsdel	Kristen Antoinette Kane
Lady Eugenia D'Ysquith et alia	Heather Ayers	Joanna Glushak	Kristen Mengelkoch	Colleen Gallagher
Magistrate and others	Kevin Ligon	Eddie Korbich	Christopher Behmke	Timothy Aaron Cooper
Tom Copley and others	Kendal Sparks	Jeff Kready	Matt Leisy	Ashton Michael Corey
Tour Guide and others	Catherine Walker	Jennifer Smith	Megan Loomis	Colleen Gallagher
Inspector Pinckney and others	Price Waldman	Price Waldman	Ben Roseberry	Conor McGiffin
Miss Evangeline Barley and others	Heather Ayers	Catherine Walker	Lesley McKinnell	Briana Gantsweg

Note: The members of the D'Ysquith family include Lord Adalbert D'Ysquith, Eighth Earl of Highhurst; Lord Henry D'Ysquith, his heir; Lord Asquith D'Ysquith Sr.; Asquith D'Ysquith Jr.; the Rev. Lord Ezekial D'Ysquith; Maj. Lord Bartholomew D'Ysquith; Lady Salome D'Ysquith Pumphrey; Lady Hyacinth D'Ysquith and Chauncey D'Ysquith. Chauncey is almost never listed in the family tree to preserve the surprise of his appearance.

=== Broadway cast replacement history ===
- Carole Shelley and Catherine Walker replaced Jane Carr as Miss Shingle and Lauren Worsham as Phoebe D'Ysquith respectively on October 28, 2014. Sandra DeNise took over Walker's original track as Miss Evangeline Barley and others at the same performance as well.
- Jeff Kready temporarily replaced Bryce Pinkham as Monty Navarro from January 20 until July 28, 2015. Kevin Massey took over Kready's original track as Tom Copley and others at the same performance as well.
- Scarlett Strallen replaced Lisa O'Hare as Sibella Hallward on February 10, 2015.
- Judy Blazer replaced Carole Shelley as Miss Shingle on June 30, 2015.
- Jordan Bondurant replaced Kevin Massey as Tom Copley and others on August 11, 2015.

== Critical response ==
Charles Isherwood of The New York Times praised the Hartford production as "ingenious" and "among the most inspired and entertaining new musical comedies". Isherwood also favorably reviewed the musical's Broadway production, writing that the show was "delightful", praising Mays as "dazzling", and adding that it was one of the shows "that match streams of memorable melody with fizzily witty turns of phrase."

Elysa Gardner, reviewing for USA Today, also praised Mays, saying that his "comedic gifts are on glorious display". She had positive words for the direction ("witty") and the "drolly imaginative scenic and projection design", concluding that the musical was "morbidly hilarious".

== Awards and nominations ==
=== Original Broadway production ===
Year	Award	Category	Nominee	Result	Ref.
2014
2014	Tony Award	Best Musical		Won	
2014	Tony Award	Best Book of a Musical	Robert L. Freedman	Won	
2014	Tony Award	Best Original Score	Steven Lutvak (music and lyrics) and Robert L. Freedman (lyrics)	Nominated	
2014	Tony Award	Best Actor in a Musical	Jefferson Mays	Nominated	
2014	Tony Award	Best Actor in a Musical	Bryce Pinkham	Nominated	
2014	Tony Award	Best Featured Actress in a Musical	Lauren Worsham	Nominated	
2014	Tony Award	Best Direction of a Musical	Darko Tresnjak	Won	
2014	Tony Award	Best Orchestrations	Jonathan Tunick	Nominated	
2014	Tony Award	Best Scenic Design	Alexander Dodge	Nominated	
2014	Tony Award	Best Costume Design	Linda Cho	Won	
2014	Drama Desk Award	Outstanding Musical		Won	
2014	Drama Desk Award	Outstanding Book of a Musical	Robert L. Freedman	Won	
2014	Drama Desk Award	Outstanding Music	Steven Lutvak	Nominated	
2014	Drama Desk Award	Outstanding Lyrics	Steven Lutvak and Robert L. Freedman	Won	
2014	Drama Desk Award	Outstanding Actor in a Musical	Jefferson Mays	Won	
2014	Drama Desk Award	Outstanding Actor in a Musical	Bryce Pinkham	Nominated	
2014	Drama Desk Award	Outstanding Featured Actress in a Musical	Lauren Worsham	Won	
2014	Drama Desk Award	Outstanding Director of a Musical	Darko Tresnjak	Won	
2014	Drama Desk Award	Outstanding Orchestrations	Jonathan Tunick	Nominated	
2014	Drama Desk Award	Outstanding Set Design of a Musical	Alexander Dodge	Nominated	
2014	Drama Desk Award	Outstanding Sound Design of a Musical	Dan Moses Schreier	Nominated	
2014	Drama Desk Award	Outstanding Projection Design	Aaron Rhyne	Won	
2014	Outer Critics Circle Award	Outstanding New Broadway Musical		Won	
2014	Outer Critics Circle Award	Outstanding Book of a Musical	Robert L. Freedman	Won	
2014	Outer Critics Circle Award	Outstanding New Score	Steven Lutvak (music and lyrics) and Robert L. Freedman (lyrics)	Nominated	
2014	Outer Critics Circle Award	Outstanding Actor in a Musical	Jefferson Mays	Won	
2014	Outer Critics Circle Award	Outstanding Actor in a Musical	Bryce Pinkham	Nominated	
2014	Outer Critics Circle Award	Outstanding Featured Actress in a Musical	Lisa O'Hare	Nominated	
2014	Outer Critics Circle Award	Outstanding Director of a Musical	Darko Tresnjak	Won	
2014	Outer Critics Circle Award	Outstanding Choreographer	Peggy Hickey	Nominated	
2014	Outer Critics Circle Award	Outstanding Set Design	Alexander Dodge	Nominated	
2014	Outer Critics Circle Award	Outstanding Costume Design	Linda Cho	Nominated	
2014	Outer Critics Circle Award	Outstanding Lighting	Philip S. Rosenberg	Nominated	
2014	Drama League Award	Distinguished Production of a Musical		Won	
2014	Drama League Award	Distinguished Performance Award	Jefferson Mays	Nominated	
2015	Grammy Award	Best Musical Theater Album	Jefferson Mays & Bryce Pinkham (principal soloists); Kurt Deutsch & Joel Moss (producers); Robert L. Freedman (lyricist) & Steven Lutvak (composer/lyricist)	Nominated	
