= Lisa O'Hare =

British actress

- Born: Lisa Jane O'Hare; 11 November 1983 (age 42); Morecambe, Lancashire, England
- Occupation: Actress
- Spouse: Brian Shoemaker (m. 2009)
- Children: 2
- Website: lisaohare.com

Lisa Jane O'Hare (born 11 November 1983) is an English actress who has played Eliza Doolittle in My Fair Lady and the title character of Mary Poppins in the West End and UK stage. She more recently has appeared in several prime-time American television shows on TNT, ABC and NBC. She most recently starred on Broadway in the musical, A Gentleman's Guide to Love and Murder.

== Career ==
O'Hare was trained as a ballet dancer, and performed in dance-oriented shows such as Alice and the Others at Sadler's Wells and Defile at the Royal Opera House. Moving to musical theatre, O'Hare joined the original London production of Mary Poppins as the understudy for the original Laura Michelle Kelly as well as a member of the original ensemble in December 2004. She left the production in July 2005.

From 28 September 2005 at the Palace Theatre in Manchester, O'Hare joined the National UK Tour of Cameron Mackintosh's production of My Fair Lady as the alternate Eliza Doolittle, sharing the role with Amy Nuttall until the UK tour ended on 12 August 2006 at the Wales Millennium Centre in Cardiff.

On 6 November 2006, O'Hare returned to the London production of Mary Poppins assuming the title role on a full-time basis. She replaced Scarlett Strallen, making her the third actress to hold the West End title role. Her last performance with the London Company on the show was on 19 May 2007.

In 2007, O'Hare reprised her role as Eliza Doolittle in the national US tour of My Fair Lady alongside Christopher Cazenove as Henry Higgins, who had starred with her in the National UK Tour. The US tour opened on 12 September 2007 in Tampa, Florida, and closed on 22 June 2008 in Tempe, Arizona. For her portrayal of Eliza Doolittle in the States, O'Hare was nominated for the 2008 Helen Hayes Award for Outstanding Lead Actress in a Non-Resident Production and was nominated and won the 26th Elliot Norton Award for Outstanding Musical Performance.

Since returning to the UK, O'Hare starred as the title role in Gigi from 6 August to 13 September 2008 at Regent's Park Open Air Theatre.

On 6 July 2008, O'Hare and two other actresses who had portrayed Mary Poppins on stage (Scarlett Strallen and Caroline Sheen) performed the song "Practically Perfect" for a special concert of George Stiles and Anthony Drewe's songs, "A Spoonful of Stiles and Drewe", at Her Majesty's Theatre. This version was released on CD in December 2008. O'Hare most recently reprised her critically acclaimed role as Mary Poppins in the National UK tour of Mary Poppins. She assumed the role on 27 October 2008 in Edinburgh, replacing Caroline Sheen, and continued through Manchester and Cardiff until the tour's closure on 18 April 2009. In April 2012 she returned to the role in the Perth, Australia season of the play along with Matt Lee playing the role of Bert.

Lisa O'Hare made her American television debut in 2010, guest-starring in the sixth season of TNT's award-winning show The Closer playing Jenny in "Last Woman Standing". Shortly afterward, O'Hare guest-starred as Kitty Canary in ABC's Castle – "A Deadly Affair". As the premiere episode in Castle's third season, O'Hare was able to showcase her dancing talents as the owner and performer of a burlesque bar to millions of dedicated viewers. In October 2010, O'Hare guest-starred in J.J Abrams action-thriller series Undercovers on NBC. She played Marie Murphy, a double-crossing wife of Irish descent in "Jailbreak".

In 2011, she played Sally Bowles in Cabaret for the Reprise Theatre Company at the Freud Playhouse. She won the LA Drama Critics Circle Award for Lead Performance.

She originated the role of Sibella Hallward in the Broadway musical, A Gentleman's Guide to Love and Murder, and was followed by Scarlett Strallen.

In 2015, O'Hare once again picked up her carpet bag and reprised the role of Mary Poppins in the Mary Poppins Musical in Zurich, Switzerland. After returning from Europe, Lisa once again reprised another one of her favorite roles, playing Eliza Doolittle in My Fair Lady at Chicago's Lyric Opera starring opposite Richard E. Grant. Lisa received enormous praise for her portrayal.

In 2018, she was cast as Georgia Goodwin on NBC's hit show New Amsterdam, starring opposite Ryan Eggold.

== Personal life ==
O'Hare is from the seaside town of Morecambe, Lancashire, England. She attended the Royal Ballet School from age 11 to 16.

O'Hare, her husband, and children reside in village of Hest Bank, Lancaster and is a member of SAG/AFTRA and Actors' Equity.

== Filmography ==
Year	Title	Role	Notes
2003	Moloko: Forever More	Dancer	(Video short)
2010	The Closer	Jenny	Guest (1 episode, Season 6)
2010	Castle	Kitty Canary	Guest (1 episode, Season 3)
2010	Undercovers	Marie Murphy	Guest (1 episode, Season 1)
2018–2019	New Amsterdam	Georgia Goodwin	Recurring role
2022	The Sandman	Clarice Farrell	Recurring role
2022–2025	Wednesday	Arlene	Guest (2 episodes, Seasons 1–2)
