= Bryce Pinkham =

American stage and screen actor (born 1982)

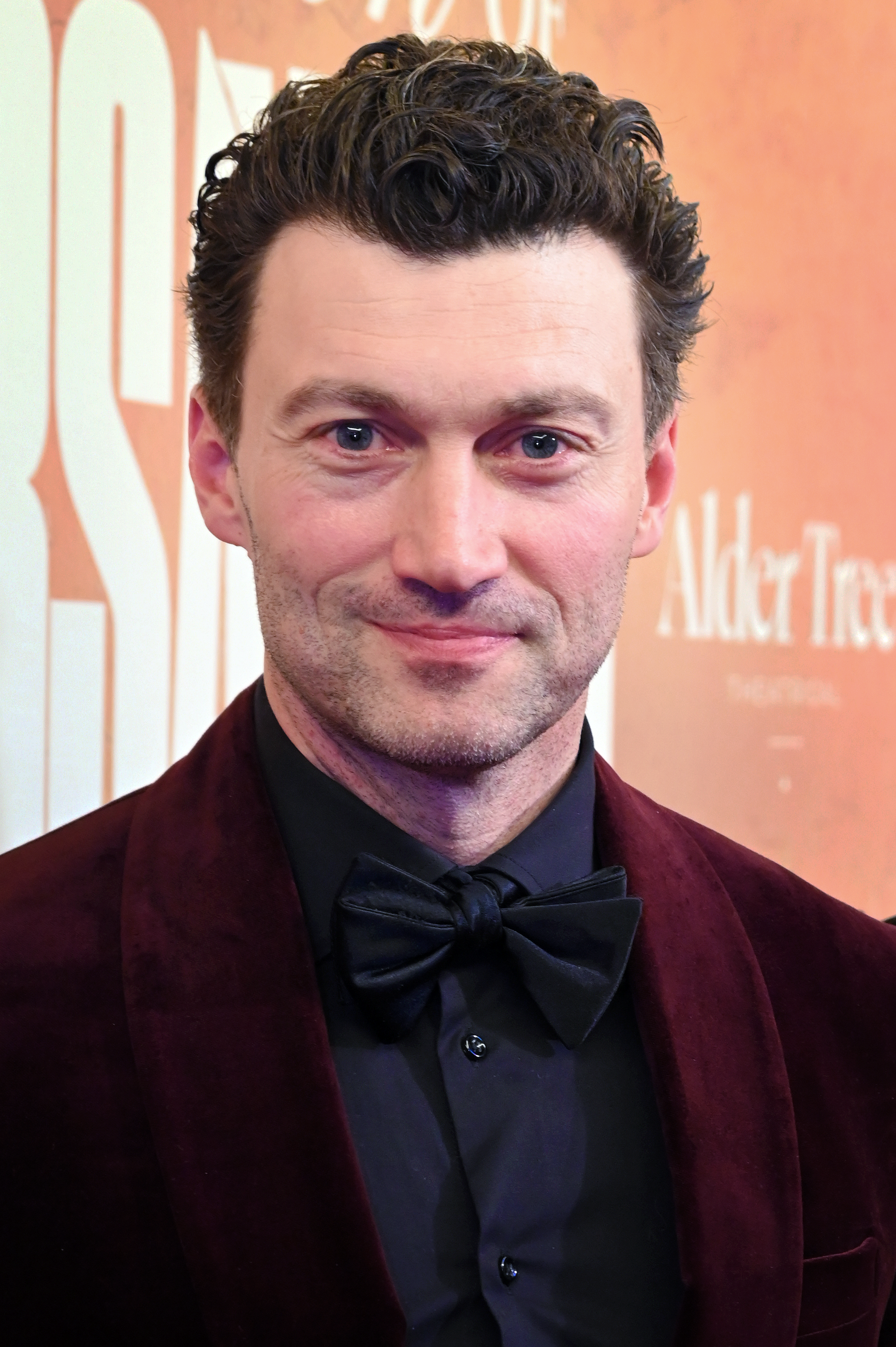
- Pinkham in 2025
- Born: Bryce Allen Pinkham; October 19, 1982 (age 44); Redding, California, U.S.
- Education: Boston College (BA); Yale University (MFA)
- Occupations: Actor; singer
- Years active: 2009–present
- Spouse: Scarlet Strallen
- Children: 2
- Musical career
- Genres: Musical theatre; crossover; pop
- Instrument: Vocals

Bryce Allen Pinkham (born October 19, 1982) is an American actor and singer. He is a two-time Tony nominated actor for his roles as Monty Navarro in A Gentleman's Guide to Love and Murder and The Arbiter in Chess. He also received a Grammy nomination for Best Musical Theater Album for A Gentleman's Guide to Love and Murder. He has appeared in the PBS period drama Mercy Street and voices Stolas in the adult animated Amazon Prime Series Helluva Boss. He is a Leonore Annenberg Arts Fellow and co-founder of Zara Aina, a not-for-profit children's theater company in Madagascar.

== Personal life ==
Pinkham was born in Redding, California. He was raised in the East San Francisco Bay Area. He attended Campolindo High School in Moraga, California. He is a graduate of Boston College and the Yale School of Drama.

In 2012, Pinkham co-founded the not-for-profit children’s theater company Zara Aina (Share Life) with Lucas Caleb Rooney, to empower at-risk children in Madagascar.

In 2015, Pinkham said "I did musicals growing up as a kid, and it was always a dream to be in a Broadway musical, to play the lead in a Tony-winning musical."

He is an avid hiker and has hiked the Sierra Nevada Mountains as well as in New Zealand and Iceland.

Pinkham is married to actress Scarlett Strallen; the couple has two children: Winnie and Wilder.

== Career ==
Pinkham's Broadway debut was in Bloody Bloody Andrew Jackson, followed by Ghost: The Musical. In 2013, he originated the role of Monty Navarro in the Broadway production of A Gentleman's Guide to Love and Murder, for which he was nominated for a Tony Award for Best Performance by a Leading Actor in a Musical as well as a Grammy Award. He played Peter Patrone in the Broadway revival of The Heidi Chronicles, and was nominated for an Outer Critics Circle Award and the Drama League Award for Distinguished Performance. In 2016, he returned to Broadway leading the cast of Roundabout Theatre Company's musical, Irving Berlin's Holiday Inn. Pinkham is currently playing the role of "The Arbiter" in the revival of Chess, for which he has received a Tony nomination for Best Featured Actor in a Musical.

His film and television appearances include as a series regular in the second season of the TV series Mercy Street, playing Major Clayton McBurney III, head of the Union Army hospital. Other roles include performances in the comedy The Comedian (2016) which stars Robert De Niro, and Baz Luhrmann's Netflix drama The Get Down and on the CBS dramas The Good Wife and Person of Interest. He appeared in the PBS miniseries God in America, "A Nation Reborn Drama" (2010). In 2012, Pinkham was awarded the Leonore Annenberg Fellowship given to "a limited number of exceptionally talented young dancers, musicians, actors and visual artists as they complete their training and begin their professional life." He played the role on Broadway for over 700 performances. In 2014, he played Paul Revere in an introductory commercial titled Italian Invasion for the Fiat 500L, created by the Doner Company. Pinkham has been voicing Stolas in the YouTube and Amazon Prime adult animated web series Helluva Boss since 2020.

== Filmography ==
| Year | Title | Role | Notes |
|---|---|---|---|
| 2010 | The Good Wife | Dr. Hanson | CBS |
| 2010 | God in America | Charles Briggs | PBS |
| 2012 | Person of Interest | Leland Raines | CBS |
| 2014 | Wallflowers | Greg | 2 episodes |
| 2016 | The Comedian | Devon O'Connor | |
| 2016 | It Had to Be You | TV Psychopath | |
| 2017 | The Get Down | Julien | Netflix |
| 2017 | Mercy Street | Clayton McBurney III | PBS |
| 2018 | Blindspot | Jack Izenberg | 2 episodes |
| 2019 | The Wonderful Wingits | Malvolio (voice) | TV short |
| 2019 | Proven Innocent | Connor Mayfeld | 5 episodes |
| 2019 | Almost Love | Taylor | |
| 2019 | Instinct | Paul | Episode: "One-of-a-Kind" |
| 2020 | The Blacklist | Newton Purcell | NBC |
| 2020–present | Helluva Boss | Stolas (voice) | YouTube, Amazon Prime Video |
| 2022 | Julia | John Updike | HBO Max |

== Theater ==
| Year | Title | Role | Venue | Notes |
|---|---|---|---|---|
| 2009 | Bloody Bloody Andrew Jackson | Henry Clay | The Public Theater | Concert |
| 2010 | A Funny Thing Happened on the Way to the Forum | Hero | Williamstown Theatre Festival | Regional |
| 2010–2011 | Bloody Bloody Andrew Jackson | Henry Clay / Black Fox u/s Andrew Jackson | Bernard B. Jacobs Theatre | Original Broadway Cast |
| 2012 | Ghost: The Musical | Carl Bruner | Lunt-Fontanne Theatre | Original Broadway Cast |
| 2013–2015 | A Gentleman's Guide to Love and Murder | Monty Navarro | Walter Kerr Theatre | Original Broadway Cast |
| 2014 | Waitress | Dr. Jim Pomatter | American Repertory Theater | Workshop |
| 2015 | The Heidi Chronicles | Peter Patrone | Music Box Theatre | Original Broadway Revival Cast |
| 2015–2016 | A Gentleman's Guide to Love and Murder | Monty Navarro | Walter Kerr Theatre | Original Broadway Cast |
| 2016 | 1776 | John Dickinson | New York City Center | Encores! Off-Broadway |
| 2016 | Holiday Inn | Jim Hardy | Studio 54 | Original Broadway Cast |
| 2017 | My Fair Lady | Freddy Eynsford-Hill | Civic Opera House | Lyric Opera of Chicago |
| 2017 | Man of La Mancha | Don Quixote / Miguel de Cervantes | Merkin Hall | Concert |
| 2018 | Chess | The Arbiter | Kennedy Center | Pre-Broadway tryout |
| 2019 | Superhero | Jim | Tony Kiser Theater | Original Off-Broadway Cast |
| 2019 | Benny & Joon | Sam | Paper Mill Playhouse | |
| 2019 | The Great Society | Robert F. Kennedy | Vivian Beaumont Theatre | Original Broadway Cast |
| 2022 | Little Shop of Horrors | Orin Scrivello & Others | Westside Theatre | Off-Broadway replacement |
| 2022–2023 | Ohio State Murders | Robert Hampshire | James Earl Jones Theatre | Original Broadway Cast |
| 2022 | Chess | The Arbiter | Broadhurst Theatre | Broadway Concert |
| 2023 | Little Shop of Horrors | Orin Scrivello & Others | Westside Theatre | Off-Broadway replacement |
| 2023-2024 | Little Shop of Horrors | Orin Scrivello & Others | Westside Theatre | Off-Broadway replacement |
| 2025-2026 | Chess | The Arbiter | Imperial Theatre | Original Broadway Revival Cast |

== Awards and nominations ==
| Year | Award | Category | Nominated Work | Result |
|---|---|---|---|---|
| 2014 | Tony Award | Best Actor in a Musical | A Gentleman's Guide to Love and Murder | Nominated |
| 2014 | Drama Desk Award | Outstanding Actor in a Musical | A Gentleman's Guide to Love and Murder | Nominated |
| 2014 | Outer Critics Circle Award | Outstanding Actor in a Musical | A Gentleman's Guide to Love and Murder | Nominated |
| 2015 | Drama League Award | Distinguished Performance | The Heidi Chronicles | Nominated |
| 2015 | Outer Critics Circle Award | Outstanding Featured Actor in a Play | The Heidi Chronicles | Nominated |
| 2026 | Tony Award | Best Featured Actor in a Musical | Chess | Nominated |
| 2026 | Broadway.com Audience Awards | Favorite Featured Actor in a Musical | Chess | Nominated |
| 2026 | Broadway.com Audience Awards | Favorite Funny Performance | Chess | Nominated |
