= Mary Poppins (musical) =

2004 stage musical

- London promotional poster
- Music: Richard M. Sherman; Robert B. Sherman; George Stiles
- Lyrics: Richard M. Sherman; Robert B. Sherman; Anthony Drewe
- Book: Julian Fellowes
- Basis: Mary Poppins by P. L. Travers; Mary Poppins by Bill Walsh; Don DaGradi
- Productions: 2004 Bristol (tryout); 2004 West End; 2006 Broadway; 2008 1st UK Tour; 2009 North American Tour; 2015 2nd UK Tour; 2019 West End revival; 2024 3rd UK Tour; International productions

Mary Poppins is a musical with music and lyrics by the Sherman Brothers and additional music and lyrics by George Stiles and Anthony Drewe, and a book by Julian Fellowes. The musical is based on the similarly titled Mary Poppins children's books by P. L. Travers and the 1964 Disney film and is a fusion of various elements from the two, including songs from the film.

Produced by Cameron Mackintosh and Disney Theatrical Productions and directed by Richard Eyre with co-direction from Matthew Bourne who also acted as co-choreographer with Stephen Mear, the original West End production opened in December 2004 and won two Olivier Awards, one for Best Actress in a Musical and the other for Best Theatre Choreographer. A Broadway production with a near-identical creative team opened in November 2006, with only minor changes from the West End version. It received seven Tony nominations, including Best Musical, and won for Best Scenic Design in a Musical. The original Broadway production closed in March 2013, after 2,619 performances. Touring and international productions followed.

The musical has become a popular choice for schools and community theatres to produce.

== Development ==
In 1993, theatrical producer Cameron Mackintosh met P. L. Travers and acquired the rights to develop a stage play adaptation of her Mary Poppins books. She only agreed to a stage production as long as the creators were all English, and no one who had worked on the Disney film adaptation was involved with the stage production. In 2001, Mackintosh and Thomas Schumacher, head of Disney Theatrical Productions, opened talks on a possible collaboration, so that the stage play would be able to use the songs from the Disney film. With both sides committed, a preliminary outline of the show was written in 2002.

Around this time, songwriters George Stiles and Anthony Drewe heard about the project, and independently wrote a demo version of a new introductory song for the character of Mary, titled "Practically Perfect". They submitted the song to Mackintosh, and due to his positive response, were officially brought on to the creative team. Julian Fellowes was brought on to write the show's script because of his "clear understanding of the social niceties of the English class system that prevailed in the Edwardian era".

An experienced production team was assembled, including Sir Richard Eyre, multi award-winning director of film, theatre and opera; and Bob Crowley, a theatre designer who has worked with the Royal Shakespeare Company, the National Theatre, the Royal Ballet and the Royal Opera. Crowley also has six Tony Awards for various Broadway productions.

A workshop of the show was held at the end of 2003 at the rehearsal room at London's Old Vic Theatre, using the cast of My Fair Lady, which had just closed in the West End. After four weeks of rehearsals at Sadler's Wells, the production moved to Bristol, where an out-of-town tryout opened at the Bristol Hippodrome on September 15, 2004.

== Productions ==
=== Original West End production (2004–08) ===
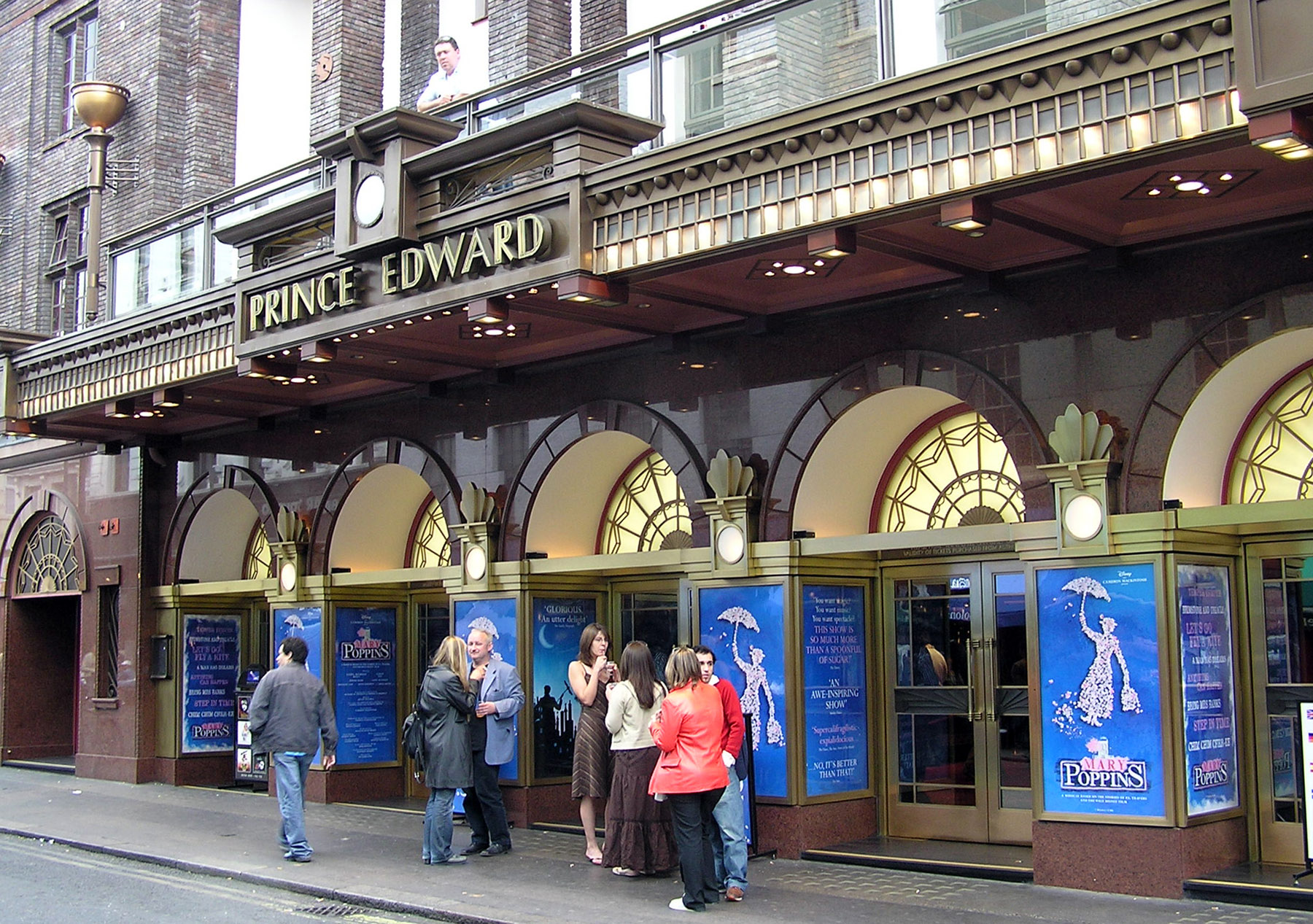
Prince Edward Theatre in the West End showing Mary Poppins in June 2005

Cameron Mackintosh's stage adaptation of Mary Poppins had its world premiere at the Bristol Hippodrome starting with previews from September 15, 2004, before officially opening on September 18 for a limited engagement until November 6. The production then moved to the Prince Edward Theatre in the West End on December 15, 2004, making it the only Disney musical to have premiered in the UK. The role of Mary was played by Laura Michelle Kelly, who subsequently won the 2005 Olivier Award for Best Actress in a Musical for the role, and the role of Bert was played by Gavin Lee. Notable replacements included Scarlett Strallen, Lisa O'Hare and Caroline Sheen as Mary Poppins and Gavin Creel as Bert (from July 2006).

End of the first West End run on 12 January 2008

The show sparked mild controversy not long after its debut when producers Cameron Mackintosh and Thomas Schumacher banned children below three years old from entering the theatre, deeming the show too scary for young children. The ban remained throughout the show's entire run, during which the theatre staff were to prevent patrons with children below three to enter. The show was officially tagged as being "for children seven years and up".

On March 17, 2005, Julie Andrews, who played Mary Poppins in the film, visited the show as a guest. She appeared onstage during the curtain calls, where she gave a speech recalling her own memories from making the film and praising the cast for their new interpretation. The production closed on January 12, 2008, after a run of more than three years.

=== Original Broadway production (2006–2013) ===
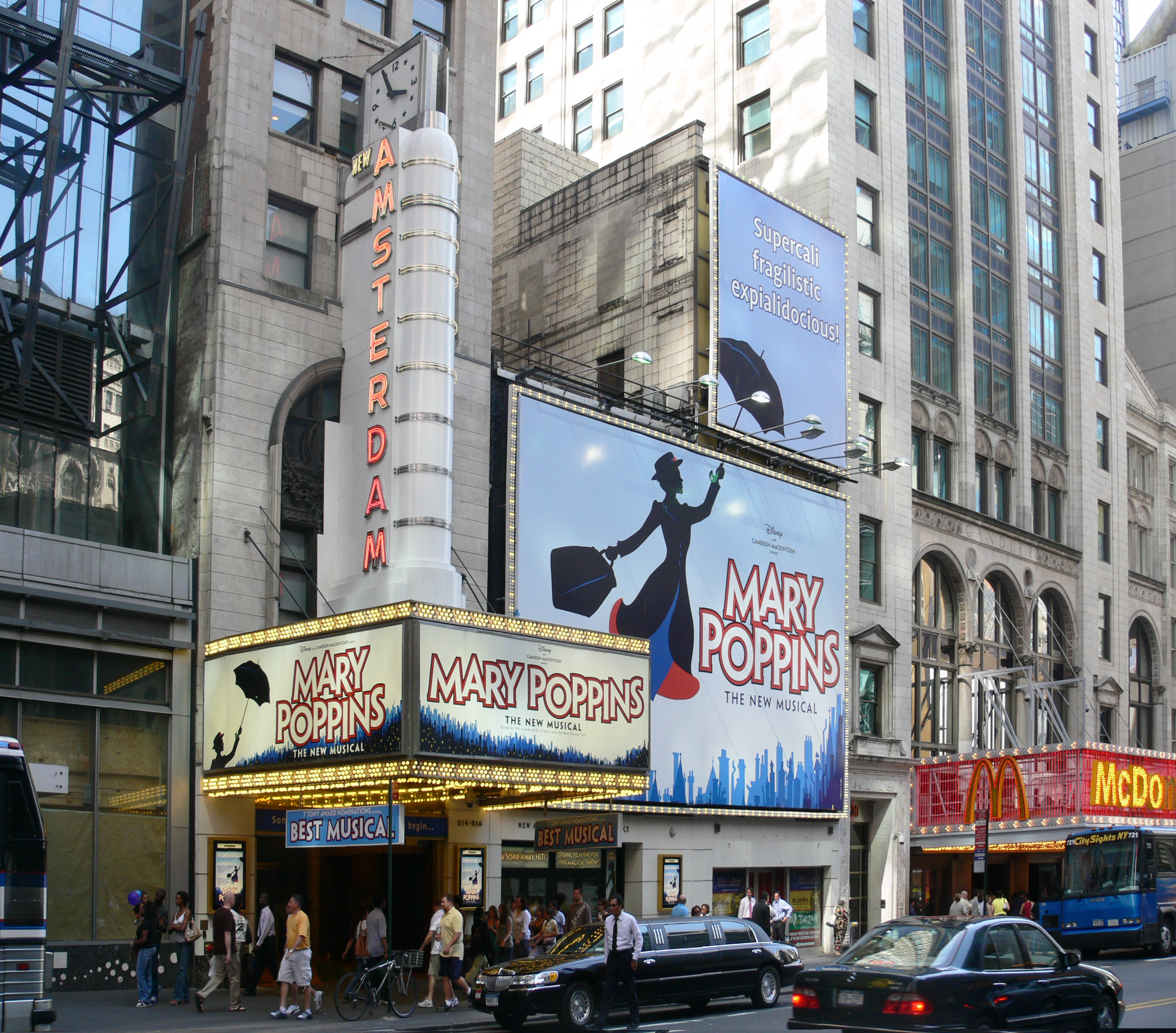
New Amsterdam Theatre showing Mary Poppins, 2007

Following the success of the West End production, a Broadway production debuted on November 16, 2006, at the New Amsterdam Theatre after previews from October 14. Ashley Brown played the title role, and Gavin Lee, who had originated the role of Bert in the West End production, reprised his role on Broadway. Daniel Jenkins played George Banks, Rebecca Luker was Winifred, and Matthew Gumley and Henry Hodges played Michael. Starting October 9, 2008, the role of Mary was played by Scarlett Strallen (reprising her role from the West End production) and Bert was played by Adam Fiorentino. Laura Michelle Kelly, who originated the role of Mary in London, took over the role on Broadway on October 12, 2009. Christian Borle joined the cast the same day as Bert. Nicolas Dromard played Bert from July 16 to August 22, 2010. Lee returned to the role of Bert on August 24, 2010, and was reunited with former London co-star, Kelly. Brown returned to the title role from March 8 to July 17, 2011, while Kelly was away filming a movie, reuniting her with Lee, and Kelly returned to the role on July 19, 2011.

The Broadway production differed from the London production in that the "Jolly Holiday" sequence was staged in full technicolor instead of the gray tones of the London show, and in "Anything Can Happen" the stairs to the heavens were replaced by a giant version of Mary's umbrella entering from the stage floor. These changes were later transferred back to the West End production. Most recently, a new song has been added to the score, titled "Playing the Game". This replaces the already new "Temper, Temper" in the first act. This change has been added to all current and future productions of the show.

The Broadway production received generally positive reviews, ranging from enthusiastic to lukewarm. Many critics praised the show for its technical merits. After running for 52 weeks, the show recouped its original investment.

The production closed on March 3, 2013, after more than six years and 2,619 performances on Broadway, to make way for Disney's Aladdin. The closing cast included Steffanie Leigh as Mary and Dromard as Bert. As of May 2026, it remains Broadway's twenty-sixth longest-running show.

=== National tours ===
For the touring productions of the show, designer Bob Crowley changed the sets, making the Banks' Household smaller in size, and deleting numerous intermediate scenes, so that smaller theatres could accommodate the large-scale demands of the production.

A UK tour of the London production commenced on June 4, 2008, and ended on April 18, 2009, with stops at venues including the Theatre Royal, Plymouth, Edinburgh Playhouse, and the Wales Millennium Centre in Cardiff. Its cast featured Caroline Sheen as Mary Poppins, Daniel Crossley as Bert, Martin Ball as George Banks and Louise Bowden as Winifred Banks. Lisa O'Hare took over the role of Mary on October 27, 2008. The UK Tour became the last production to include "Temper, Temper" before it was replaced by "Playing the Game" in future productions.

A United States tour began previews on March 11, 2009, with the opening night on March 25, featuring Ashley Brown and Gavin Lee reprising their roles as Mary and Bert, respectively. The tour began at the Cadillac Palace Theatre in Chicago, and played in many U.S. cities. On November 15, 2009, during the opening night in Los Angeles, Dick Van Dyke (who played Bert in the film) appeared onstage during the encore. On January 22, 2010, to raise funds for a local charity and as part of a D23 event, Van Dyke did a cameo of his other role from the original film of Mr. Dawes Sr. In 2009, the song "Temper, Temper" was cut and replaced by a new musical number, titled "Playing the Game." Sheen took over the role of Mary from Brown in February 2010 in Tempe, Arizona and played the role until February 2011. Nicolas Dromard, who previously understudied the role of Bert on Broadway, took over the role from September 2010 until September 2011. Steffanie Leigh joined the cast as Mary Poppins on February 8, 2011 and was replaced on December 6, 2011, by Megan Osterhaus who had played Winifred Banks on Broadway and later returned to Broadway as Winifred. The U.S. National tour played its last performance on June 2, 2013, in Anchorage, Alaska.

A new UK tour directed by Richard Eyre began a run at the Curve Theatre, Leicester from October 13 until October 25, 2015 starring Zizi Strallen as Mary Poppins and Matt Lee reprising his original role in the Australian production as Bert. The tour then visited Bristol (October 29 - November 28, 2015), Dublin (December 3, 2015 - January 9, 2016), Manchester (January 20 - March 5, 2016), Birmingham (March 9 - April 23, 2016), Edinburgh (April 27 - May 21, 2016) and Southampton (May 25 - June 19, 2016). In November 2015, more dates were added including Norwich (June 29 - July 30, 2016), Plymouth (August 3 - September 3, 2016), Newcastle (September 8 - October 29, 2016), Bradford (November 2 - December 10, 2016) and finishing in Cardiff (December 14, 2016 - January 14, 2017).

On March 7, 2024 a new UK tour was announced, opening at the Bristol Hippodrome on 4 November, before heading to Dublin, Edinburgh, Plymouth, Manchester, Bradford, Birmingham, Southampton, Sunderland, Milton Keynes, Cardiff and Liverpool. The opening of the new tour in Bristol marked 20 years since the show started out-of-town previews before transferring to the West End. The show is co-directed by Richard Eyre and Matthew Bourne and co-choreographed by Matthew Bourne and Stephen Mear. It has a reimagined set and costume design by Bob Crowley, and again is co-produced by Cameron Mackintosh and Disney Theatrical Productions. Casting includes Stefaine Jones as Mary and Jack Chambers as Bert, reprising their roles from the Sydney 2022 production.

=== West End revival (2019–2023) ===
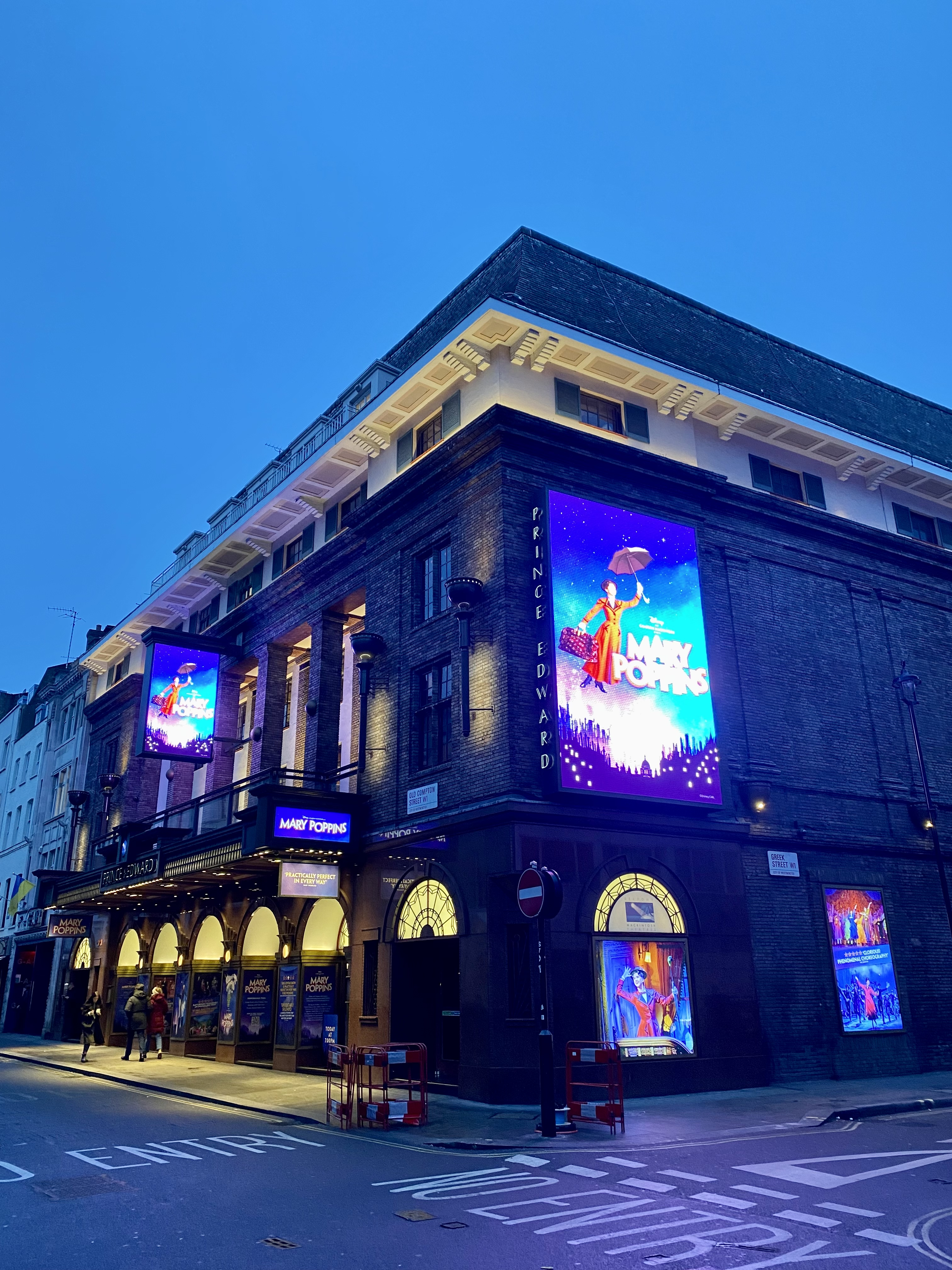
West End revival of Mary Poppins at Prince Edward Theatre in December 2022

A West End revival began previews on October 23, 2019 at the Prince Edward Theatre and officially opened on November 13. The cast included Zizi Strallen as Mary Poppins (reprising her role from the 2015-16 UK Tour), Charlie Stemp as Bert, Joseph Millson as George Banks, Amy Griffiths as Winifred Banks, Petula Clark as the Bird Woman, Claire Moore as Miss Andrew, and Paul F. Monaghan as Admiral Boom (Barry James was originally due to play this part but he left before the first preview for unknown reasons). The show was forced to close temporarily from March 16, 2020 as a result of the COVID-19 pandemic. It reopened on August 7, 2021 at the Prince Edward Theatre with most of the same cast returning. On June 22, 2022 Louis Gaunt temporarily took over from Charlie Stemp whilst he performed in the revival of Crazy For You at the Chichester Festival Theatre. The show played its final West End performance on January 8, 2023.

=== International productions ===
Mary Poppins has been played in Australia, Austria, Canada, Czech Republic, Denmark, Estonia, Finland, Germany, Hungary, Iceland, Ireland, Italy, Japan, Mexico, Netherlands, New Zealand, Norway, Sweden, Switzerland, United Arab Emirates, United Kingdom, and United States, and has been translated into thirteen languages (Swedish, Finnish, Hungarian, Danish, Dutch, Czech, Estonian, Spanish, Icelandic, German, Norwegian, Italian, and Japanese). Over eleven million people have seen the show worldwide.

The first foreign-language production opened on October 18, 2008 at the Gothenburg opera house, where it ran until March 14, 2009. This production was externally licensed by Disney Theatrical and performed entirely in Swedish, with the book translated by Magnus Lindman. The musical director was Björn Dobbelaere, with actors Linda Olsson as Mary and Magnus Borén as Bert.

Other European productions include:

- The Finnish production opened at the Helsinki City Theatre in Helsinki on August 11, 2009 and ran until May 8, 2010.
- On February 18, 2010 a Danish production opened in Copenhagen, Denmark, at the Det Ny Teater, starring Charlotte Guldberg as Mary and Kristian Studsgaard as Bert.
- The Hungarian production opened in Budapest, Hungary, in September 2012.
- On April 11, 2010 a Dutch-language production opened at the AFAS Circustheater in The Hague, produced by Stage Entertainment. Noortje Herlaar, the actress who played the role of Mary was found in the TV show Op zoek naar Mary Poppins. William Spaaij portrayed Bert. The production closed on August 28, 2011 to make way for Wicked.
- A Czech production opened in Brno, Czech Republic, in November 2010.
- In November 2011 the Estonian production opened at the Vanemuine Theatre in Tartu, with performances also in Tallinn. The original cast included Hanna-Liina Võsa and Nele-Liis Vaiksoo in the role of Mary Poppins.
- In October 2012, Stage Entertainment announced that Mary Poppins would open in Paris in the 2013/14 season, but after months of unsuccessful searching for an actress to play the title role, Cameron Mackintosh decided to cancel the project.
- An Icelandic production opened at the Reykjavík City Theatre in Reykjavík, Iceland, on February 22, 2013.
- The German-language premiere of the musical ran at the Ronacher Theater in Vienna, Austria, from October 1, 2014 to January 31, 2016. The cast included Annemieke van Dam as Mary and David Boyd as Bert.
- On October 23, 2016 a second German-language version opened at the Apollo-Theater in Stuttgart, produced by Stage Entertainment and starring Elisabeth Hübert as Mary and David Boyd as Bert. After closing in Stuttgart on January 28, 2018 the show was transferred to the Stage Theater an der Elbe in Hamburg from February 25, 2018.
- An Italian production premiered on February 13, 2018 at the Teatro Nazionale in Milan, with Giulia Fabbri as Mary and Davide Sammartano as Bert.

The Australian production began previews at Her Majesty's Theatre in Melbourne on 14 July 2010, officially on 29 July. The cast included Matt Lee as Bert, Philip Quast as Mr. Banks, Marina Prior as Winifred Banks, Debra Byrne as The Bird Woman, and Judi Connelli as Miss Andrew. Verity Hunt-Ballard was awarded the role of Mary Poppins late in the casting stage, after a long search. She was temporarily replaced towards the end of the Sydney run by Scarlett Strallen, who had starred in the role in both the West End and Broadway productions. An Australian Cast Recording was released on February 18, 2011. The Melbourne season closed on April 1, 2011. The musical played in Sydney at the Capitol Theatre from April 2011 to mid-December 2011. The musical then went on an Australian tour, playing at the Lyric Theatre in Brisbane until March 2012 and the Burswood Theatre, Perth until June 2012. After a four-month break, the production opened at the Civic Theatre in Auckland, New Zealand, from 18 October until 30 December 2012. In May 2021, it was announced the show would return to Australia in May 2022 at the Sydney Lyric Theatre with a nationwide search to find a new Mary Poppins.

From November 14, 2012 to August 11, 2013, the first Spanish-language version of the show ran at the Centro Cultural in Mexico City, produced by Ocesa Teatro and starring Bianca Marroquin as Mary and Mauricio Salas as Bert.

In April 2015 Brazilian entertainment company Time for Fun opened auditions for the Portuguese-language premiere in São Paulo, but eventually the production was cancelled.

The first Japanese language production opened on March 25, 2018 in Tokyo before moving to Osaka in May 2018.

== Casting history ==
Character	West End	Broadway	First UK Tour	US National Tour	Melbourne	Second UK Tour	First West End Revival	Sydney	Third UK Tour
Character	2004	2006	2008	2009	2010	2015	2019	2022	2024
Mary Poppins	Laura Michelle Kelly	Ashley Brown	Caroline Sheen	Ashley Brown	Verity Hunt-Ballard	Zizi Strallen	Zizi Strallen	Stefanie Jones	Stefanie Jones
Bert	Gavin Lee	Gavin Lee	Daniel Crossley	Gavin Lee	Matt Lee	Matt Lee	Charlie Stemp	Jack Chambers	Jack Chambers
George Banks	David Haig	Daniel Jenkins	Martin Ball	Karl Kenzler	Philip Quast	Milo Twomey	Joseph Millson	Tom Wren	Michael D. Xavier
Winifred Banks	Linzi Hateley	Rebecca Luker	Louise Bowden	Megan Osterhaus	Marina Prior	Rebecca Lock	Amy Griffiths	Lucy Maunder	Lucie-Mae Sumner
Jane Banks	Nicola Bowman Carrie Hope Fletcher Poppy Lee Friar Charlotte Spencer Faye Spittlehouse	Katherine Doherty Delaney Moro Kathryn Faughnan	Maddy Allison Liberty Cheesman Niamh Coombes Chloe Jones Molly Phillips Isabella Sedgwick	Abigail Droeger Aida Neitenbach Kirrilee Berger	Victoria Borcsok Hayley Edwards Zoe Gousmett Scout Hook Sara Reed	Felicity Biggs Verity Biggs Violet Tucker Maia West Lottie Sicilia	Adelaide Barham Imogen Bourn Charlotte Breen Ellie Kit Jones Nuala Peberdy	Harriet Alder Chloe Delle-Vedove Mia Honeysett Siena Kann Amara Kavaliku	Katie Ryden Matilda O'Sullivan Olaya Martinez Cambon Olivia Ainsworth Florence Swann
Michael Banks	Jake Catterall Perry Millward Jack Montgomery Harry Stott Ben Watton	Matthew Gumley Henry Hodges Alexander Scheitinger	Charlie Callaghan Tyler Fagan Thomas Goodall Max Griesbach William Pearce George Spittle-McGuire	Justin Hall Christopher Flaim Bryce Baldwin	Mark Balas Callum Hawthorne Trent Heath Kade Hughes Kurtis Papadinis	Diego Sanna Louis Fernee Finley Miller Cameron Lant Regan Garcia	Joseph Duffy Samuel Newby Gabriel Payne Edward Walton Fred Wilcox	Xavier Daher Ben Stabile William Steiner Finn Walsham Saxon Weaver	William Stafford Jude Martin-Thomas Oscar McCulloch Joshua Miles Charlie Donald
Miss Andrew	Rosemary Ashe	Ruth Gottschall	Deryn Edwards	Ellen Harvey	Judi Connelli	Penelope Woodman	Claire Moore	Chelsea Plumley	Wendy Ferguson
Bird Woman	Julia Sutton	Cass Morgan	Valda Aviks	Mary Van Arsdel	Debra Byrne	Grainne Renihan	Petula Clark	Nancye Hayes	Patti Boulaye
Mrs. Brill	Jenny Galloway	Jane Carr	Shirley Jameson	Valerie Boyle	Sally Anne Upton	Wendy Ferguson	Claire Machin	Hannah Waterman	Rosemary Ashe
Robertson Ay	Gerard Carey	Mark Price	Mark Anderson	Andrew Keenan-Bolger	Christopher Rickerby	Blair Anderson	Jack North	Gareth Isaac	Ruairidh McDonald
Mrs. Corry	Melanie La Barrie	Janelle Anne Robinson	Tania Mathurin	Q. Smith	Leah Howard	Wreh-Asha Walton	Malinda Parris	Cherine Peck	Sharon Wattis
Admiral Boom	Ian Murford	Michael McCarty	Ronald Markham	Mike O'Carroll	David Henry	Graham Hoadly	Paul F. Monaghan	Robert Grubb	David Burrows

=== Notable replacements ===
==== Original West End production (2005–08) ====
- Mary Poppins: Scarlett Strallen, Lisa O'Hare, Caroline Sheen
- Bert: Gavin Creel
- George Banks: Aden Gillett
- Winifred Banks: Eliza Lumley
- Miss Andrew: Louise Gold
- Michael Banks: Rob Madge

==== Original Broadway production (2006–13) ====
- Mary Poppins: Scarlett Strallen, Laura Michelle Kelly
- Bert: Christian Borle, Nicolas Dromard
- George: Laird Mackintosh
- Jane Banks: Elizabeth Teeter, Lila Coogan
- Admiral Boom/Bank Chairman: Ed Dixon, Jonathan Freeman

==== First UK Tour (2008–09) ====
- Mary Poppins: Lisa O'Hare

==== US Tour (2009–2013) ====
- Mary Poppins: Caroline Sheen
- Bert: Nicolas Dromard

==== Melbourne production (2010–2012) ====
- Mary Poppins: Scarlett Strallen
- George: Simon Burke

==== First West End revival (2019–22) ====
- Miss Smythe/Miss Andrew: Liz Robertson
- Mrs Corry: Tania Mathurin
- Miss Lark: Laura Medforth

== Synopsis ==
=== Act I ===
Bert, a man of many professions, introduces the audience to Cherry Tree Lane ("Prologue/Chim Chim Cher-ee/Cherry Tree Lane – Part 1") in Edwardian London. Number 17 is where the Banks family lives: George and Winifred Banks, their two naughty children Jane and Michael, their cook/maid, Mrs. Brill and their house boy, Robertson Ay. Things are not going well for Jane and Michael. They are out of control and, as the show starts, their latest nanny, Katie Nanna, storms out. After that, Mrs. Brill and Robertson Ay complain about living in a "madhouse." The children decide to write the advertisement for a new nanny ("The Perfect Nanny"), but George, having a very different idea of what constitutes the perfect nanny, tears up the piece of paper and throws it in the fireplace. The family all reflect on if they will ever find the perfect nanny ("Cherry Tree Lane - Part 2"). Within moments, Mary Poppins arrives, restored advertisement in hand, and takes charge of the Banks children, having every confidence in her own qualifications and merits ("Practically Perfect").

On the children's first outing to the park, they meet Bert and, despite their reservations, Mary teaches them that they must learn to look past appearances. To illustrate the point, Mary brings the park statues, including a mythological figure named Neleus, to life ("Jolly Holiday"). A storm starts to brew and the children quickly hurry home, but not before Neleus mentions how much he misses his father.

While Mary manages the children, other problems lie with their parents. Winifred is aware that she is somehow disappointing both her children and her husband. George, on the other hand, can't understand why she finds the role of wife and mother so difficult. In an effort to please her husband, Winifred sends out invitations for a smart tea party ("Cherry Tree Lane (Reprise) / Being Mrs. Banks / Jolly Holiday (Reprise)"). Mrs. Brill makes the preparations, while telling an eager Robertson Ay to keep his hands off. The children inadvertently sabotage the kitchen preparations, but Mary sorts it out with a lesson ("A Spoonful of Sugar"). However, it is then revealed that none of the invitees are coming and Winifred reflects on her failure at pleasing George ("A Spoonful Of Sugar (Reprise)").

Mary takes the children to visit their father at the bank where he works ("Precision and Order"). There, George is busy dealing with possible investment clients: firstly, an ambitious man named Herr Von Hussler with an elaborate money-making scheme, and then a middle-class man named John Northbrook with a simple factory project. George is furious when Mary turns up with the children, but an innocent question asked by Jane (What's more important, a good man or a good idea?) makes him realise how much his values have changed ("A Man Has Dreams") since he was an idealistic young man. He then decides to accept Northbrook's project and rejects Von Hussler's, even though he knows the bank disapproves.

Outside St. Paul's Cathedral, Mary introduces the children to the Bird Woman ("Feed the Birds"). Jane is suspicious of her, but Michael responds to the Bird Woman and throws crumbs for the birds. On the trip home, the children meet the enigmatic Mrs. Corry who runs a magic sweet shop that also sells words ("Supercalifragilisticexpialidocious").

The children return home in high spirits, unaware that things have gone wrong for their father. Unknown to them, George's decision to reject Von Hussler has cost the bank dearly, and he is suspended without pay. George explodes with rage at the children and they are sent to the nursery. Reacting to their father's outburst, Mary briefly points out that other members of the family are rarely there to take care of the parents, before Jane and Michael get into a fight over Jane's doll Valentine, prompting a displeased Mary to order them to bed and enchant them to sleep. The frightening consequence of Jane's anger becomes apparent moments afterwards, as Valentine and the rest of Jane and Michael's disgruntled toys come to life and join Mary in teaching them a lesson in how to take better care of their belongings and toys (formerly "Temper, Temper", now "Playing the Game").

Believing that Jane and Michael need personal growth, Mary decides to leave Cherry Tree Lane to bring them to their senses, and speaks with Bert about her decision ("Chim Chim Cher-ee – Rooftop Duet"). She then flies away using her magical parrot headed umbrella. Jane and Michael wake up to find Mary Poppins and their toys gone, leaving only a note on the floor that reads, "Dear Jane and Michael, keep playing the game. Au Revoir, Mary Poppins." Mrs. Brill sees them awake, and when asked about what "Au Revoir" means, she tells them that it means "Till we meet again" before sending them in for bed.

=== Act II ===
In a misguided attempt to please her husband, Winifred arranges for his childhood nanny, Miss Andrew, to take over from the suddenly departed Mary ("Cherry Tree Lane (Reprise)"). At the sight of her, a terrified George flees, exclaiming "the Holy Terror!" To everyone's shock and dismay, he is right. Miss Andrew is a brutal and cruel tyrant, quick to administer her own terrible elixir ("Brimstone and Treacle Part 1") and discipline by threatening to split Jane and Michael up by taking charge of Jane and sending Michael to boarding school. After Miss Andrew goes to her room, Jane and Michael decide that running away is the only solution.

The children find their good friend Bert, who cheers them up and helps Michael fulfill his dream of flying a kite ("Let's Go Fly a Kite"). Mary Poppins flies in on the kite from the sky and reunites with the children. They update her on Miss Andrew and she takes them home, planning to "surprise" Andrew. Also hiding in the park is George, who is depressed over his supposed lack of achievements ("Good For Nothing"). Searching for him is Winifred, who at last understands her husband and the damage that was done to him by Miss Andrew ("Being Mrs Banks (Reprise)").

When the children return to Number 17, Mary sets Caruso, Miss Andrew's lark, free from his cage. This leads to a confrontation between the two nannies, ending with Miss Andrew having a taste of her own medicine as she is trapped in a large birdcage and vanishes down below ("Brimstone and Treacle Part 2"). Winifred and then George return at this point, surprised but pleased that Miss Andrew has "left".

The group ascends to the rooftops, where Bert introduces the children to his friends the chimney sweeps ("Step in Time"). The sweeps' dance eventually enters the house, causing chaos. As the sweeps quickly exit, George receives a telegram from the bank requesting his presence there. George assumes that he has been fired and decides it's time to sell the family heirloom. However, the vase is shattered accidentally by Mrs. Brill, who goes into a despairing shock since she had been cleaning it from the top of the shelf. When she is being led away for comfort, George goes to clean the broken pile himself, to find it reveal a collection of gingerbread stars from his childhood. This leads to a brief moment of reflection for George ("A Man Has Dreams (Reprise) / A Spoonful Of Sugar (Reprise)"). After shaking hands with Bert, George leaves to meet the Chairman of the Bank.

At the children's encouragement, Winifred decides to follow her heart and be at George's side at the bank ("Anything Can Happen (Part 1)"). Unseen to anyone else, Mary takes Jane and Michael into the sky to follow, where they watch the unfolding events. On his way to the bank, George encounters the bird woman and gives her tuppence to feed the birds ("Feed The Birds (Reprise)")

At the bank ("Precision And Order (Reprise)"), George is surprised to learn the consequence of his choice: far from ruining the bank, he has made a fortune by both rejecting Von Hussler and approving Mr. Northbrook's loan. They ask for the word that made them so successful, which George admits to be Mary's word, ("Supercalifragilisticexpialidocious (Reprise)"). Winifred, arriving to defend her husband, finds instead he is the hero of the hour. After she mentions Miss Andrew's name to the Bank Manager, the old man, too, relates his experience under "the Holy Terror". Winifred convinces the manager to quadruple George's salary. George apologizes for underestimating her, and together they return to the house. Mary and Bert take the children across the skies and they see everyone they met along their journey ("Anything Can Happen (Part 2)").

Mary realises that with the family reunited and happy, her task is done. With regret, she says goodbye to Bert with a kiss on the cheek and sets off ("A Spoonful Of Sugar (A Task Is Done)"). Jane and Michael accept that Mary is leaving them and tell her that they'll never forget her. The two children watch as their parents waltz happily together and Mary flies high above the audience using her magical parrot headed umbrella.

== Differences from the film and books ==
The stage musical is not a direct adaptation of the Disney film, but features elements of the film and the original books, plus original updated elements. The dancing penguins in the "Jolly Holiday" sequence and the tea party on the ceiling at Uncle Albert's (likely due to the inability to make things float on stage) from the film have been removed, although some community theatres dress their chorus as penguins for "Jolly Holiday". The character of Neleus from the books comes to life in the musical, but was not seen in the film. Mrs. Corry and her daughters have a cameo in the film, and are in the musical and books. There are many elements from the books that do not appear in the film or musical, such as Nellie Rubina and the Balloon Woman.

The musical places more emphasis on Jane and Michael being naughty and their parents being dysfunctional to heighten the drama. Jane and Michael are constantly answering back and fighting, necessitating a new sequence where Mary brings Jane's doll Valentine and the other toys to life to berate them in the song "Playing the Game". This sequence, originally titled "Temper Temper," was inspired from a chapter in the books titled Bad Wednesday. George Banks has been expanded from the film: in the musical it is revealed that he had a difficult childhood in which he was ignored by his parents, Jane and Michael's paternal grandparents, and was placed under the care of a fearsome nanny. This nanny, Miss Andrew, a character from the books, makes an appearance in the musical as the polar opposite of Mary Poppins, advocating "brimstone and treacle" instead of "a spoonful of sugar". Winifred Banks is no longer the suffragette of the film, but a former actress who is struggling to fulfill her husband's expectations of her. The character of Ellen the maid, played by Hermione Baddeley in the film, was cut entirely. A new character, Miss Smythe, was created to introduce the bank chairman. Admiral Boom does not blow his cannon making the house shake like he does in the film.

The bank chairman's father does not make an appearance like in the film, nor does Mr. Binnacle, Admiral Boom's assistant. New characters were developed to create a new conflict at the bank, the nice John Northbrook and scheming Herr Von Hussler. Another character from the books that is in the musical is Robertson Ay, the houseboy, who did not appear in the film.

A number of musical sequences have been modified from their purpose in the film. These are:

- "A Spoonful of Sugar" – Originally sung when Mary first arrives at the Banks home; has been moved to a completely new sequence later in the show where the children destroy the Banks kitchen and Mary helps them fix it. It is also referred to in "Brimstone and Treacle Part 2" and featured briefly as a reprise at the finale.
- "Supercalifragilisticexpialidocious" – Originally sung during the park outing; has been moved to Mrs. Corry's sweet shop outing. It is also sung when George goes to his workplace (during the Anything Can Happen sequence) and during the curtain call. The song itself is also distinctly different, as the word is spelled, both vocally and physically.
- "Feed the Birds" – Originally sung by Mary before the Banks children visit their father's workplace; has been moved to after the visit and is now sung as a duet between Mary and the Birdwoman. The later musical reprise, during the scene where George walks to the bank, still occurs, but omits the film's memorable dramatic suggestion that the Birdwoman has died. Instead a reformed George shares a joyous moment with her.
- "Let's Go Fly a Kite" – Originally sung as the finale by the Banks family at the end of the film; has been moved to near the beginning of Act 2, where it is sung by Bert and the Banks children.

== Major characters ==
- Mary Poppins – the namesake and lead female character. Her last name describes her behavior, because she tends to "pop in" and "pop out" of children's lives whenever she pleases. She has the ability to fly using her umbrella, and perform magic. Her trademark looks are dark hair, rosy cheeks, long coats, an umbrella with a parrot head, and her hat with cherry stems. Her family and background are never mentioned in the musical, although in the original books she has an uncle Albert Wigg, and a cousin, Arthur. She also claims to be cousins with inanimate things like the Man in the Moon, and a King cobra at the zoo. In one story in the original book, she briefly mentions her mother. She moves into 17 Cherry Lane to help the Banks Family.
- Bert – the narrator of the story. In the book, his full name is Herbert Alfred. He is a song and dance man, charismatic and charming. A "jack of all trades", it is hinted he possesses some magic ability as well, or at least knows all about the magical world that Mary Poppins comes from. It is mentioned Bert has known Mary before the story starts, but no details of how are mentioned. His family and background are also never mentioned, nor where he lives. Bert spends time in the park that sits on one side of Cherry Tree Lane, and he mentions that he has seen Jane and Michael before, but it is not until Mary Poppins arrives that he interacts with them.
- Winifred Banks – the wife of George Banks, and mother to Jane and Michael. In the musical and film, she is presented as a society woman. In the film, she is a suffragette and involved in social causes. In the musical, she is a former actress. Her family and maiden name are not mentioned, however in the books, she has two aunts that are mentioned, Aunt Flossie and Aunt Caroline. In the musical, Winifred is shown to be confused and overwhelmed with her family and her role in it. It is hinted that she did not grow up in the same strict manner as her husband, perhaps she did not even have a nanny as a child, and is not from this area, which makes it difficult for her to connect and make friends. In the original books, she has five children instead of two, including the twins, John and Barbara, and later a baby, Annabel.
- George Banks – the husband of Winifred, and father of Jane and Michael Banks. George grew up in a very strict and stern household. He mentions hardly ever seeing his mother and father, who did not believe in public displays of affection. George works at a bank in London, and it is hinted that his father did as well. George had a nanny named Miss Euphemia Andrew as a child, who was also very strict. George is often away at work and rarely spends time with the children. In the film and musical, as the story goes on, he learns lessons about being more affectionate to his family and is taught that they are more important than work. While George was a supporting character in the film, his part in the musical is expanded to a leading role.
- Jane Banks – the eldest of George and Winifred, she is described as being messy and having a bad temper. Her middle name in the books is Caroline, which is after Winifred's Aunt Caroline, who is also Jane's godmother.
- Michael Banks – the son of George and Winifred. He is a mischievous little boy who likes to play pranks on his nannies and not follow the rules. He longs for more attention and time with his father, which is most likely the cause of his behavior.
- Mrs. Brill – the maid for the Banks family. She is overworked and often stressed due to the behavior of the children and the demands placed on her by Mr. and Mrs. Banks. Her family and background are never mentioned. She appears in the original books and film, which also feature another maid, Ellen. In the musical, Ellen was cut and only Mrs. Brill appears.
- Robertson Ay – the houseboy for the Banks family. He appears in the original books, but not in the film. His background and family are never mentioned. He is described as being a bit lazy and sleepy, but also kind and a friend to the Banks children. He often is the cause of chaos and is not very helpful, however the Banks family puts up with him.
- Miss Andrew – George Banks' former nanny. She appears in the original books but not in the film. She is a very mean and strict nanny, the antagonist of the story. In the musical, after Mary Poppins leaves, Winifred contacts her and asks her to come to Cherry Tree Lane, which ends with a duel with Mary Poppins that ends with Mary defeating her and sending her off. Miss Andrew is described as an old spinster, never having married or having children of her own. She is mentioned throughout Act 1 of the musical but does not appear until Act II, which features her song "Brimstone and Treacle". Miss Andrew owns a beloved pet bird, a lark. Usually the actress who plays Miss Andrew also plays Miss Smythe, a bank employee and Queen Victoria, a statue of the monarch in the park. Sometimes is also doubled with the Bird Woman.
- Mrs. Corry – Mrs. Corry is a magical woman who operates a magical pop-up "Talking Shop". Her customers are described as magical people known as "Chatterboxes" who feed off of good conversation and difficult words. Her shop is in the park and she is helped by her two daughters, Annie and Fannie. Mr. Corry is never mentioned. Mrs. Corry and her daughters are characters from the original books, and also appear in a cameo in the Mary Poppins film. In the musical, she leads the chorus, along with Mary and Bert, in singing and spelling out "Supercalifragilisticexpialidocious". She is described as being one of the oldest women in the world (although she doesn't look it). In the book and musical, she also gives out candy and assorted treats, including gingerbread stars that have real stars from the sky on them that customers can then light and place in the sky. In the musical she mentions that George Banks used to come into her shop when he was a child, however it is not explained how this is possible. Occasionally doubled with the Bird Woman or Miss Lark.
- The Bird Woman – The Bird Woman is a beggar woman who is dressed in rags and looks disheveled. She sits on the steps of St. Paul's Cathedral in London everyday, selling bags of crumbs for a tuppence. The cathedral is near the bank where George works, and after their visit, Jane and Michael meet the woman and Michael purchases a bag from her with the money he was given from Mr. Northbrook. Mary Poppins tells the children not to look down on her and respect her through the song "Feed the Birds". In Act II, George Banks, for the first time, stops at the steps and gives the Bird Woman money. She is a character from the books and the film. Her background and name are never mentioned. Sometimes doubled with Miss Andrew or Katie Nanna.
- Miss Lark – Miss Lark is the elderly lady that lives in an elaborate home next door to the Banks family. She appears in the books and in the film. She often runs into Jane and Michael on Cherry Tree Lane when she is out walking her dog, Willoughby. In the books it is mentioned she has maids that take care of her home and garden for her. Her family is never mentioned. She has a flirtatious relationship with Admiral Boom. Sometimes doubled with the Bird Woman.
- Park Keeper - The gruff but lovable watchman of the park. Usually doubles as Von Hussler or Northbrook, as well as Mr. Punch or the Jack-in-the-Box.
- Neleus - Neleus is a statue in the park across from the Banks house. Jane and Michael have often stood under the statue and played on it. When Mary Poppins arrives, she brings Neleus to life in "Jolly Holiday" and he becomes friends with the children. In Act II, Mary Poppins reunites Neleus with Poseidon, the King of the Sea. They had been separated much like Michael has been with his father.
- Bank Chairman - George Banks' boss, head of the bank. Doubles as Admiral Boom.
- Valentine - Jane's favorite doll. In the musical, he is brought to life by Mary Poppins and performs the song "Playing the Game" along with the other toys. The song is meant to teach the children a lesson about playing nicely with others and appreciating the value of their toys. The children's refusal to do this leads to Mary Poppins leaving the Banks house for a while. Sometimes doubled as Northbrook or the Policeman.
- Admiral Boom – Admiral Boom is a retired sea captain that lives in a grand house next door to the Banks home. He appears in the original books and the film. He is an older man who often gives readings of the weather and keeps an eye out on the neighborhood. His house is described as being built to resemble a ship. Doubles as the Bank Chairman.
- Policeman - a London cop that often chases after Michael and Jane Banks when they get into trouble. Usually doubles as some combination of Von Hussler, Northbrook, Valentine, Mr. Punch, or the Jack in the Box.
- Von Hussler- a wealthy businessman who proposes an elaborate money-making scheme to George Banks. Usually doubled with the Park Keeper or Policeman.
- John Northbrook- a normal businessman who proposes a simpler factory plan to George Banks. Usually doubled with the Park Keeper, Policeman, or Valentine.
- Katie Nanna – the last in a long line of nannies at Cherry Tree Lane before Mary Poppins arrives, Katie Nanna appears in the original books and the film. In the musical, she is only briefly seen at the beginning of the story in Act I, quitting her position after Jane and Michael refuse to listen to her and run off on her in the park. Sometimes doubles as Annie or Fannie.
- Annie and Fannie - Miss Corry's excitable daughters

== Songs ==
The following is the song list of the original London production. Subsequent productions have different songs or rearranged their order.

Act I

- "Chim Chim Cher-ee" – Bert
- "Cherry Tree Lane" (Part 1) – George, Winifred, Jane, Michael, Mrs. Brill, Robertson Ay, Katie Nanna, Bert, Admiral Boom, Mrs. Lark
- "The Perfect Nanny" – Jane, Michael
- "Cherry Tree Lane" (Part 2) – George, Winifred, Jane, Michael, Mrs. Brill, Robertson Ay
- "Practically Perfect" – Mary Poppins, Jane, Michael
- "Chim Chim Cher-ee" (All Me Own Work)* – Bert
- "Jolly Holiday" – Bert, Mary Poppins, Jane, Michael, Neleus, Statues, Parkgoers
- "Cherry Tree Lane" (Reprise) – George
- "Being Mrs. Banks" – Winifred
- "Jolly Holiday" (Reprise) – Jane and Michael
- "Chim Chim Cher-ee" (Winds Do Change)* – Bert
- "A Spoonful of Sugar" – Mary Poppins, Jane, Michael, Robertson Ay, and Winifred
- "Precision and Order"* – Chairman, Von Hussler, Northbrook, George, Mrs. Smythe, Clerks
- "A Man Has Dreams"* – George Banks
- "Feed the Birds" – Bird Woman and Mary Poppins
- "Supercalifragilisticexpialidocious" – Mary Poppins, Mrs. Corry, Bert, Jane, Michael, Annie, Fannie, Spellers
- "Supercalifragilisticexpialidocious" (Playoff)* – Bert, Ensemble
- "Chim Chim Cher-ee" (Twists and Turns)* – Bert
- "Temper, Temper" (2004–2009) – Valentine, Mr. Punch, William, Glamorous Doll, Jack-in-the Box, Ensemble
- "Playing the Game" (2009–present)† – Mary Poppins, Valentine, Ensemble
- "Chim Chim Cher-ee" (Reprise) – Bert and Mary Poppins

Act II

- "Entr'acte" – Orchestra
- "Cherry Tree Lane" (Reprise)* – Mrs. Brill, Michael, Jane, Winifred, Robertson Ay, George, Miss Andrew
- "Brimstone and Treacle" (Part 1) – Miss Andrew
- "Let's Go Fly a Kite" – Bert, Park Keeper, Jane, Michael, Park-goers
- "Good for Nothing" – George
- "Being Mrs. Banks" (Reprise) – Winifred
- "Brimstone and Treacle" (Part 2) – Mary Poppins and Miss Andrew
- "Practically Perfect" (Reprise)* – Jane, Michael, and Mary Poppins
- "Chim Chim Cher-ee" (Reprise)* – Bert
- "Step in Time" – Bert, Mary Poppins, Jane, Michael, Sweeps
- "Step in Time" (Reprise)* – Bert, Mary Poppins, Jane, Michael, Sweeps
- "A Man Has Dreams" (Reprise) – George
- "A Spoonful of Sugar" (Reprise) – George and Bert
- "Anything Can Happen" (Part 1) – Mary Poppins, Jane, Michael, Winifred
- "Feed the Birds" (Reprise)* – Bird Woman
- "Precision and Order" (Reprise)* – George, Chairman, Winifred, Clerks
- "Supercalifragilisticexpialidocious" (Reprise)* – George, Chairman, Winifred, Clerks
- "Anything Can Happen" (Part 2) – Mary, Bert, Jane, Michael, Company
- "A Spoonful of Sugar" (Reprise 2) – Mary Poppins
- "A Shooting Star" – Orchestra

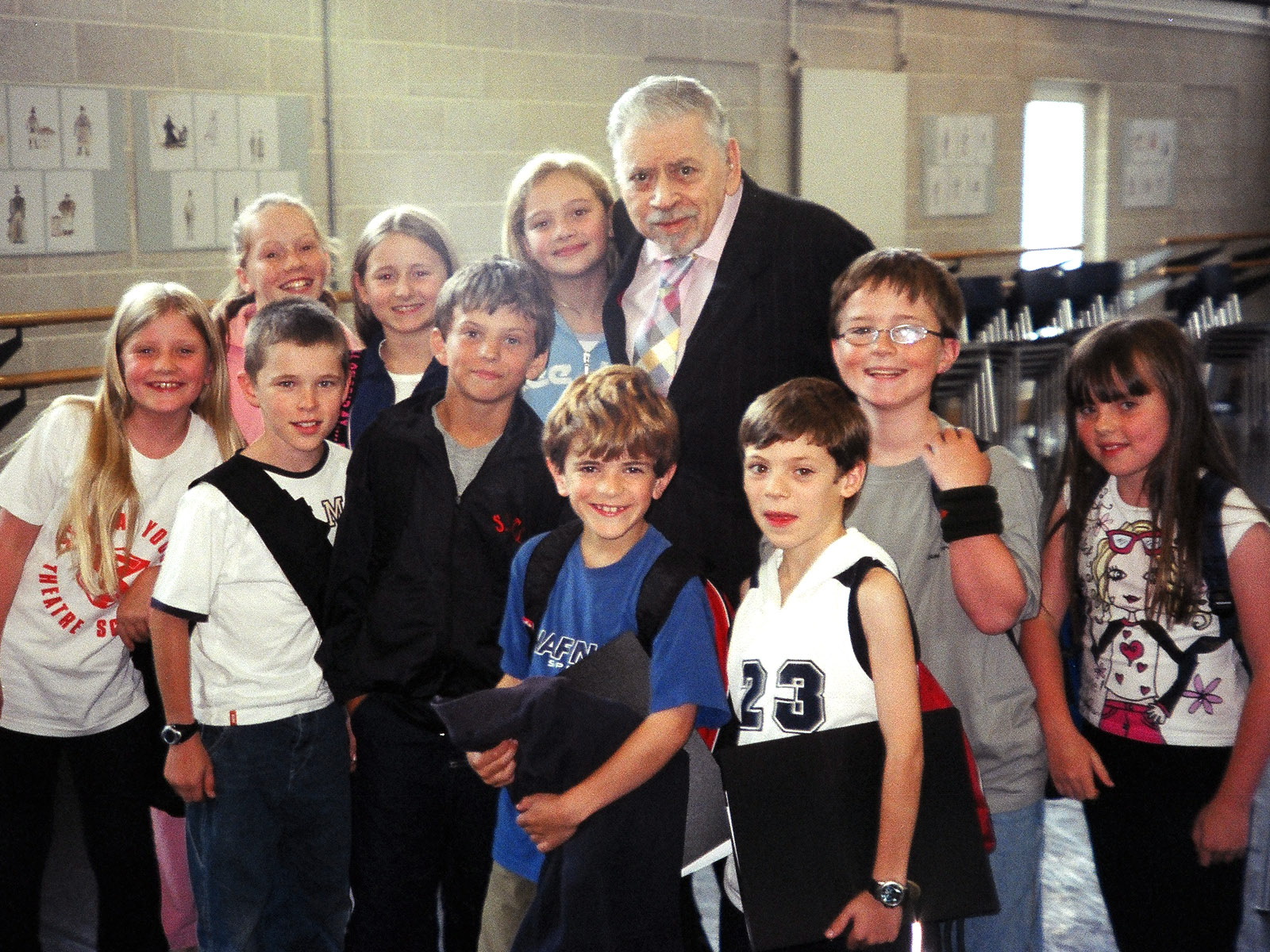
Original London Cast "Janes & Michaels", Left to right (FRONT): Poppy Lee Friar, Jack Montgomery, Perry Millward, Harry Stott, Ben Watton, Jake Catterall, Nicola Bowman. Left to right (BACK): Charlotte Spencer, Faye Spittlehouse, Carrie Fletcher, with songwriter Robert B. Sherman. (Photo Date: 19 July 2004)

*Not included in the Original London Cast recording.
†"Playing the Game" replaced "Temper, Temper" in 2009.

Deleted Songs (from the film)

Songs that were in the original movie but omitted from the musical are:

- "Sister Suffragette" (replaced by "Being Mrs. Banks" and its reprise)
- "The Life I Lead" (replaced by the thematically similar "Precision and Order")
- "Stay Awake"
- "I Love to Laugh"
- "Fidelity Fiduciary Bank"

A deleted song for Mrs. Banks was called "What I Can Do", according to an interview with George Stiles and Richard Sherman. It was thought to be a sort of 1920s-style number, so they later wrote "Being Mrs. Banks" instead.

== Instrumentation ==
The orchestration for a stage musical adaptation of the Disney classic was scored on 1 piccolo, 1 flute, 1 alto recorder, 1 oboe, 1 cor anglais, 1 chromatic harmonica, 2 clarinets, 1 bass clarinet, 2 french horns, 2 trumpets, 1 trombone, 1 bass trombone, 1 tuba, 2 keyboards, 1 Cello, 1 double bass, 1 bass guitar, 1 guitar, 1 electric guitar, 1 banjo, 1 e-bow, 1 drum kit, 1 timpani, 1 snare drum, 1 bass drum, 1 cymbal, 2 tubular bells, 1 glockenspiel, 1 xylophone, 1 marimba, 1 kalimba, 1 tam tam, 1 tambourine, 1 triangle and 1 whistle.

== Recordings ==
The original London cast recording of the show was released shortly after its West End premiere. It features most of the major musical numbers from the show's score. When the Broadway production opened, a recording was released featuring several songs with the original American cast, including an edited version of "Feed the Birds" for Ashley Brown (Mary Poppins in the original American cast) on the song. On 18 February 2011, the Australian cast recording was released; the first recording to include the changes made to the show's score since its first London production.

- Chart positions*
- Australian version*

Chart (2012)	Peak position
Australian Albums (ARIA)	13

- Dutch version*

Chart (2010)	Peak position
Dutch Albums (Album Top 100)	2

== Awards and nominations ==
=== Original London production ===
Year	Award Ceremony	Category	Nominee	Result
2005	Laurence Olivier Award	Best New Musical		Nominated
2005	Laurence Olivier Award	Best Actor in a Musical	Gavin Lee	Nominated
2005	Laurence Olivier Award	Best Actress in a Musical	Laura Michelle Kelly	Won
2005	Laurence Olivier Award	Best Performance in a Supporting Role in a Musical	David Haig	Nominated
2005	Laurence Olivier Award	Best Director	Richard Eyre and Matthew Bourne	Nominated
2005	Laurence Olivier Award	Best Theatre Choreographer	Matthew Bourne and Stephen Mear	Won
2005	Laurence Olivier Award	Best Set Design	Bob Crowley	Nominated
2005	Laurence Olivier Award	Best Costume Design	Bob Crowley	Nominated
2005	Laurence Olivier Award	Best Lighting Design	Howard Harrison	Nominated

=== Original Broadway production ===
Year	Award Ceremony	Category	Nominee	Result
2007	Tony Award	Best Musical		Nominated
2007	Tony Award	Best Performance by a Leading Actor in a Musical	Gavin Lee	Nominated
2007	Tony Award	Best Performance by a Featured Actress in a Musical	Rebecca Luker	Nominated
2007	Tony Award	Best Choreography	Matthew Bourne and Stephen Mear	Nominated
2007	Tony Award	Best Scenic Design	Bob Crowley	Won
2007	Tony Award	Best Costume Design	Bob Crowley	Nominated
2007	Tony Award	Best Lighting Design	Howard Harrison	Nominated
2007	Drama Desk Award	Outstanding Musical		Nominated
2007	Drama Desk Award	Outstanding Book of a Musical	Julian Fellowes	Nominated
2007	Drama Desk Award	Outstanding Actress in a Musical	Ashley Brown	Nominated
2007	Drama Desk Award	Outstanding Featured Actor in a Musical	Gavin Lee	Won
2007	Drama Desk Award	Outstanding Choreography	Matthew Bourne and Stephen Mear	Nominated
2007	Drama Desk Award	Outstanding Set Design	Bob Crowley	Won

=== 2019 West End revival ===
Year	Award	Category	Nominee	Result
2020	Laurence Olivier Award	Best Musical Revival		Nominated
2020	Laurence Olivier Award	Best Actor in a Musical	Charlie Stemp	Nominated
2020	Laurence Olivier Award	Best Actress in a Musical	Zizi Strallen	Nominated
2020	Laurence Olivier Award	Best Actress in a Supporting Role in a Musical	Petula Clark	Nominated
2020	Laurence Olivier Award	Best Theatre Choreographer	Matthew Bourne and Stephen Mear	Won
2020	Laurence Olivier Award	Best Set Design	Bob Crowley	Won
