= Summer Strallen =

British actress

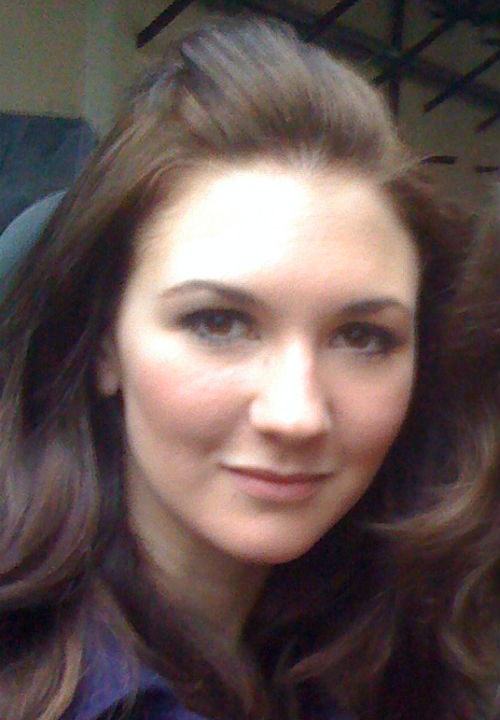
- Strallen at the London Palladium in 2008
- Born: Summer Peta Vaigncourt-Strallen; London, England
- Education: The Arts Educational Schools London; Laine Theatre Arts
- Occupations: Actress, dancer
- Years active: 1999–present
- Relatives: Scarlett Strallen (sister); Zizi Strallen (sister); Bonnie Langford (aunt)

Summer Peta Vaigncourt-Strallen is an English actress who has performed various roles on stage and screen. Her most notable theatre credits include Meg Giry in the West End production of Love Never Dies and Maria von Trapp in Andrew Lloyd Webber's revival of The Sound of Music at the London Palladium.

== Personal life ==
Strallen has three sisters who are also actresses: Saskia, Zizi and Scarlett. Her parents, performers Sandy Strallen and Cherida Langford, both performed in the original London production of Cats, but had met prior to this show. Bonnie Langford is Summer's maternal aunt. Christopher Biggins is one of her Godparents.

== Theatre career ==
Summer trained at The Arts Educational Schools London with her three sisters, and for one year at Laine Theatre Arts. She has been involved in the West End productions of Cats, Chitty Chitty Bang Bang, Guys and Dolls and The Boy Friend (for which she was nominated for the 2007 Olivier Award for Best Supporting Role in a Musical). During the Christmas season of 2006, she played the title role in the pantomime Dick Whittington and His Cat. She starred in The Drowsy Chaperone (for which she was nominated for the 2008 Olivier Award for Best Actress in a Musical), alongside Elaine Paige.

It was announced on 4 January 2008 that Strallen would take over the role of "Maria" from Connie Fisher in Andrew Lloyd Webber's West End revival of The Sound of Music, starting from 26 February 2008. As part of a publicity campaign, some months earlier on 2 October 2007, Strallen had been "planted" in the soap opera Hollyoaks as character Summer Shaw. The character's storyline eventually involved her auditioning for, and being awarded, the role of Maria in The Sound of Music. Her character left Hollyoaks as Strallen debuted in the actual stage production of The Sound of Music at the London Palladium on 26 February 2008. For this role, she was nominated for the Whatsonstage.com Theatregoers' Choice Award for Best Takeover in a Role. Strallen remained with the production until its closure on 21 February 2009.

In December 2008, Strallen competed on a special West End edition of The Weakest Link and finished in second place.

Strallen was cast as Meg Giry in the sequel to Phantom of the Opera called Love Never Dies, from February 2010 to March 2011 in the West End at the Adelphi Theatre. For this role, Strallen won the Broadwayworld.com UK Award for Best Featured Actress in a Musical and was also nominated for the Whatsonstage.com Theatregoers' Choice Award for Best Supporting Actress in a Musical. She also received another nomination for the Laurence Olivier Award for Best Performance in a Supporting Role in a Musical for this role.

She created the Ginger Rogers role of Dale Tremont in the musical, Top Hat, which began a UK tour in August 2011. The production began at the West End's Aldwych Theatre on 19 April 2012 and opened on 9 May 2012. Interview with Summer Strallen (Dale Tremont in Top Hat) For this role, she earned her fourth Olivier Award nomination. She also went on tour with Strictly Come Dancing professional Anton Du Beke, performing both songs and dances to audiences around Britain.

On 30 May 2015, she began playing the role of Maud Marshmoreton, in a musical adaptation of the novel A Damsel in Distress at the Chichester Festival Theatre. Strallen portrayed Inga in the London production of Young Frankenstein, which premiered at Theatre Royal, Newcastle in August 2017 and then transferred the following month to the Garrick Theatre.

In 2019, she played Alice in Intra Muros at the Park Theatre, followed by playing Anna in the UK tour of What's in a Name?.

For winter 2021, she made her debut at the Royal Shakespeare Company as the Countess in the new musical The Magician's Elephant.

In August 2026, Strallen took over the role of Delia Deetz in the West-End production of Beetlejuice for a limited engagement scheduled to last until November of that year.

== Television ==
Strallen voiced the part of "Princess Lucy" in The Big Knights, a British animated children and adult’s television series.

Summer played the role of Nancy Morrell in BBC One's World War Two drama Land Girls broadcast in September 2009. She also played the role of Summer Shaw in Channel 4's soap Hollyoaks, in which she was planted as a character in the show to publicise the West End Show The Sound of Music. Summer's character won herself the part of Maria in The Sound of Music, while Summer actually was preparing to play the part in real life. In April 2023, she appeared in an episode of the BBC soap opera Doctors as Jemma Dunham.

== Recordings ==
In 2008, Strallen recorded a song for the CD Act One – Songs From The Musicals Of Alexander S. Bermange, an album of 20 brand new recordings by 26 West End stars, released in November 2008 on Dress Circle Records. She can also be heard on the Love Never Dies cast recording as Meg Giry.
