= Zizi Strallen =

British actress

- Born: Sylphide Charity Vaigncourt-Strallen; London, England
- Education: The Arts Educational Schools London
- Alma mater: London Studio Centre
- Occupations: Actress, singer, dancer
- Years active: 1995–present
- Relatives: Summer Strallen (sister); Scarlett Strallen (sister); Bonnie Langford (aunt)

Sylphide Charity Vaigncourt-Strallen, known professionally as Zizi Strallen, is a British actress, singer and dancer best known for playing Mary Poppins in the Cameron Mackintosh theatrical production of Mary Poppins and her role of Glinda in the current production of Wicked (musical) in the West End.

== Personal life ==
She has three sisters, Scarlett Strallen, Summer Strallen and Saskia Strallen, all of whom are actresses. Her sister Scarlett also previously played Mary Poppins during the Broadway, West End and Sydney production of Mary Poppins. She is the daughter of Sandy Strallen and Cherida Langford. She is also the niece of Broadway and television actress Bonnie Langford.

== Career ==
Strallen appeared Off West End in the Menier Chocolate Factory production of Merrily We Roll Along as Meg Kincaid in 2013.

In 2015, Strallen performed the role of Lana in Matthew Bourne's The Car Man, for which she won Outstanding Female Performance (Modern) at the National Dance Awards.

Strallen played the role of Young Phyllis in Follies in the West End at the National Theatre from September 2017 to November 2017.

She appeared as Fran in the musical Strictly Ballroom in the West End in March 2018 at the Piccadilly Theatre. The Standard reviewer wrote: "The best news, by far, is Strallen, who exudes a lightness and brightness even when a mere face in the dance studio crowd early on. Her acting and dancing is impeccable..."

Strallen starred in the title role in the West End revival of Mary Poppins, which premiered in autumn of 2019 at the Prince Edward Theatre. She had previously played the role of Mary Poppins in the UK and Ireland tour of the musical starting in October 2015.

Strallen appeared in the 2019 fantasy film Cats as Tantomile.

Strallen also played the role of "Q" in the Chichester Festival Theatre production of Rock Follies in August 2023.

Most recently she’s appeared in concert productions of Sunset Boulevard as Betty (2021) and is set to appear in a concert of Oklahoma! as Laurey (2024).

On 16 January 2025, it was announced that Zizi would be playing Glinda in the West End production of Wicked from 25 March 2025.

== Filmography ==
=== Film ===
Year	Title	Role	Notes
1995	The Snow Queen	Polly	Voice
1997	The Ugly Duckling	Little Rabbit	Voice
2013	Merrily We Roll Along	Meg Kincaid	Filmed live performance
2015	Cinderella	Ball Guest	Uncredited
2016	The Car Man	Lana	Filmed live performance
2017	National Theatre Live: Follies	Young Phyllis	Filmed live performance
2019	Cats	Tantomile	

=== Television ===
Year	Title	Role	Notes
1996	Bramwell	Molly Marsham	Episode #2.3
1996	The Prince and the Pauper	Margery	Episode #1.4
2001	Victoria & Albert	Princess Vicky	Miniseries
2002	Dinotopia	Little Girl	Miniseries
2015	The Royal Variety Performance 2015	Mary Poppins	Television special
2022	Ant & Dec's Saturday Night Takeaway	Mary Poppins	Episode #18.2

=== Stage ===
Year	Title	Role	Notes
2011	Rock of Ages	Ensemble	West End
2012-2013	Merrily We Roll Along	Meg	Off-West End
2013	Merrily We Roll Along	Meg	West End
2014-2015	Cats	Demeter	West End
2015-2017	Mary Poppins	Mary Poppins	UK Tour
2017	Follies	Young Phyllis	Olivier Theatre
2018	Strictly Ballroom	Fran	Piccadilly Theatre
2019-2022	Mary Poppins	Mary Poppins	West End
2021	Sunset Boulevard	Betty Schaefer	Off-West End
2021	Sunset Boulevard	Betty Schaefer	Royal Albert Hall
2024	Pippin	Fastrada	West End
2024	Oklahoma!	Laurey Williams	West End
2025-2027	Wicked	Glinda	West End

== Awards and nominations ==
Year	Award	Category	Work	Result	Ref
2020	WhatsOnStage Awards	Mary Poppins	Best Actress in a Musical	Nominated	
2020	Laurence Olivier Awards	Mary Poppins	Best Actress in a Musical	Nominated	
