= Scarlett Strallen =

English actress and singer (b. 1982)

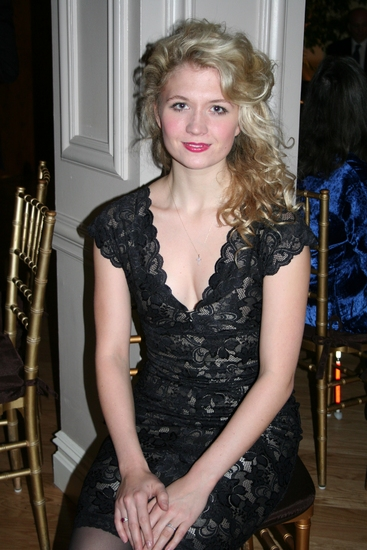
- Strallen in 2008
- Born: Scarlett Aimee Vaigncourt-Strallen; 3 July 1982 (age 44); London, England
- Education: The Arts Educational Schools London
- Alma mater: London Studio Centre
- Occupations: Actress; singer; voice actress
- Years active: 1990–present
- Spouse(s): Nicholas Skilbeck (m. 2010; div. 2014) Bryce Pinkham
- Relatives: Summer Strallen (sister); Zizi Strallen (sister); Bonnie Langford (aunt)

Scarlett Aimee Vaigncourt-Strallen (born 3 July 1982) is an English actress and singer, best known for her work in musical theatre productions in the West End and on Broadway. She has received two Olivier Award nominations, in 2006 for her portrayal of Josephine in an adaptation of H.M.S. Pinafore, performed at Regent's Park Open Air Theatre, and in 2012 for her role in Singin' in the Rain. Strallen is also a former voice actress.

== Early life ==
She is the eldest sister of Summer Strallen, Zizi Strallen and Saskia Strallen, all of whom are also actresses. Zizi played Mary Poppins like her eldest sister, first in a new UK tour and subsequently in the West End. Her parents, performers Sandy Strallen and Cherida Langford, both performed in the original London production of Cats (but had met prior to this show). She is the niece of stage and TV actress Bonnie Langford (her mother's sister). Her godfather is Christopher Biggins.

== Biography ==
Strallen played the title role in the West End production of Mary Poppins opposite Gavin Lee as Bert, at the Prince Edward Theatre from 2005 (as a replacement to original cast member Laura Michelle Kelly) to 2006, when she left to join The Royal Shakespeare Company's musical production of The Merry Wives of Windsor in Stratford. She returned to Poppins in 2007, replacing Lisa O'Hare, and stayed with the production until it closed in January 2008. For her performance as Mary Poppins, Strallen was nominated for the Best Takeover Role Award at the 2006 Theatregoers' Choice Awards. Strallen was invited to play the role in the Broadway production of Mary Poppins in 2008, replacing Ashley Brown and stayed with the show until October 2009, when she was replaced by Laura Michelle Kelly. She then temporarily played the part again in the Sydney production from November to December 2011. Strallen reprised the role of Mary Poppins with two other actresses who had also performed the role, Lisa O'Hare and Caroline Sheen, for the special benefit concert of George Stiles and Anthony Drewe's songs, "A Spoonful of Stiles and Drewe", at Her Majesty's Theatre. She had expressed interest in the West End production of Wicked, but could not audition due to her involvement with Mary Poppins.

In 2011, Strallen originated the role of Kathy Selden in the UK revival of Singin' in the Rain, a production that opened at the 2011 Chichester Festival Theatre and then moved to the West End Palace Theatre. She was nominated for the 2012 Olivier Award, Best Actress in a Musical for this role.

In 2013, Strallen originated the role of Cassie in the West End revival of A Chorus Line, which opened at the London Palladium in February 2013 and closed on 31 August 2013, and was directed by the original choreographer Bob Avian.

Later in 2013, Strallen appeared in the Menier Chocolate Factory production of Candide, where she played the role of Cunegonde from 23 November 2013 to 22 February 2014.

On 5 September 2015, Strallen made her Proms debut at the Royal Albert Hall performing the coloratura aria "Glitter and be Gay" among highlights from Candide with the John Wilson Orchestra.

She has also performed in the ensembles of the West End productions of Chitty Chitty Bang Bang, The Witches of Eastwick and Mamma Mia!.

Strallen has appeared on a number of audio books down the years. One of her first, as a child, was as Matilda Wormwood in an audio dramatisation of Roald Dahl's Matilda in 1990, released on audio cassette as part of the Roald Dahl Theatre Collection, dramatising a selection of the author's most popular children's books. She also appears in plays for BBC Radio 4.

== Voice work ==
Strallen provided the voice of The Princess in the 1995 animated film The Snow Queen. She also lent her voice to the animated television series The Dreamstone, The Big Knights (children and adults’ animated television series) and also Molly's Gang.

== Theatre appearances ==
- The Witches of Eastwick 2000 (original cast)
- Chitty Chitty Bang Bang 2002 - Truly Scrumptious
- The Merry Wives of Windsor - Anne Page
- Mary Poppins 2005/06 and 2008/09 - Mary Poppins (Broadway, West End, and Sydney)
- Mamma Mia!
- The Music Man - Marian Paroo at Chichester Festival Theatre 2008 Season
- Passion 2010 - Clara at Donmar Warehouse
- Singin' in the Rain 2011/12 - Kathy Selden at Chichester Festival Theatre and West End
- A Chorus Line 2013 West End - Broadway Revival
- Candide (operetta) 2013 - 2014 Menier Chocolate Factory
- Macbeth 2014 - Lady Macduff - Park Avenue Armory
- A Gentleman's Guide to Love and Murder 2015 - Sibella Walter Kerr Theatre Broadway
- She Loves Me 2016 - Amalia Balash Menier Chocolate Factory
- Oklahoma! 2017 - Laurey BBC Proms
- Travesties 2018 - Gwendolen American Airlines Theatre Broadway
- Nell Gwynn 2018 - Nell Gwynn Chicago Shakespeare Theater
- Stephen Sondheim's Old Friends 2025 - Samuel J. Friedman Theatre Broadway

== Personal life ==
Strallen was married to musical director Nicholas Skilbeck from 2010 to 2014.

Strallen is married to actor Bryce Pinkham, and they have two children together.
