= Laurence Olivier Award for Best Theatre Choreographer =

Annual award for London theatre

Gillian Lynne Award for Best Theatre Choreographer
- Awarded for: Best Theatre Choreographer
- Location: England
- Presented by: Society of London Theatre
- First award: 1991
- Currently held by: Fabian Aloise for Evita (2026)
- Website: officiallondontheatre.com/olivier-awards/

The Gillian Lynne Award for Best Theatre Choreographer is an annual award presented by the Society of London Theatre in recognition of the "world-class status of London theatre." The awards were established as the Society of West End Theatre Awards in 1976, and renamed in 1984 in honour of English actor and director Laurence Olivier.

This award was introduced in 1991 as the Best Theatre Choreographer award and was renamed in honor of English choreographer Gillian Lynne in 2023.

== Winners and nominees ==
=== 1990s ===
Year	Choreographer	Production
1991
1991	Charles Augins	Five Guys Named Moe
1991	Terry John Bates	Dancing at Lughnasa
1991	Lawrence Evans	The Trackers of Oxyrhynchus
1992
1992	Rafael Aguilar	Matador
1992	Steven Berkoff	The Trial
1992	The Dancers	Tango Argentino
1992	Anthony Van Laast	Joseph and the Amazing Technicolor Dreamcoat
1993
1993	Susan Stroman	Crazy for You
1993	Kenneth MacMillan	Carousel
1993	Marcello Magni	The Street of Crocodiles
1993	Tommy Tune	Grand Hotel
1994
1994	Luke Cresswell and Steve McNicholas	Stomp!
1994	Welcome Msomi	Tamburlaine the Great
1994	Arlene Phillips	Grease
1994	Anthony Van Laast	The Beggar's Opera
1995
1995	David Atkins and Dein Perry	Hot Shoe Shuffle
1995	Jonathan Lunn	Pericles
1995	Rob Marshall	She Loves Me
1995	David Toguri	Once on This Island
1996
1996	Dein Perry	Tap Dogs
1996	Lars Bethke	Fame
1996	Wayne McGregor	A Little Night Music
1997
1997	Bob Avian	Martin Guerre
1997	Wayne Cilento	Tommy
1998
1998	Simon McBurney	The Caucasian Chalk Circle
1998	Rob Marshall	Damn Yankees
1998	Ann Reinking	Chicago
1998	Matt West	Beauty and the Beast
1999
1999	Susan Stroman	Oklahoma!
1999	Loukmaan Adams and Jody Abrahams	Kat and the Kings
1999	Peter Gennaro	Annie
1999	Arlene Phillips	Saturday Night Fever

=== 2000s ===
Year	Choreographer	Production
2000
2000	Garth Fagan	The Lion King
2000	Peter Darling	Candide
2000	Craig Revel Horwood	Spend Spend Spend
2000	Stephen Mear	Soul Train
2001
2001	Bob Fosse and Ann Reinking	Fosse
2001	Peter Darling	Merrily We Roll Along
2001	Stephen Mear	Singin' in the Rain
2001	Meryl Tankard	The Beautiful Game
2002
2002	Matthew Bourne	My Fair Lady
2002	Irving Davies	The Play What I Wrote
2002	Scarlett Mackmin	Privates on Parade
2002	Kathleen Marshall	Kiss Me, Kate
2003
2003	Matthew Bourne and Company	Play Without Words
2003	Peter Darling	Our House
2003	Craig Revel Horwood	My One and Only
2003	Susan Stroman	Contact
2004
2004	Karen Bruce	Pacific Overtures
2004	Jenny Arnold	Jerry Springer
2004	Rob Ashford	Thoroughly Modern Millie
2005
2005	Matthew Bourne and Stephen Mear	Mary Poppins
2005	Adam Cooper	Grand Hotel
2005	Susan Stroman	The Producers
2006
2006	Peter Darling	Billy Elliot
2006	Rob Ashford	Guys and Dolls
2007
2007	Javier de Frutos	Cabaret
2007	Rob Ashford	Evita
2007	Bill Deamer	The Boy Friend
2007	Stephen Mear	Sinatra
2008
2008	Toby Sedgwick	War Horse
2008	Rob Ashford	Parade
2008	Jerry Mitchell	Hairspray
2008	Casey Nicholaw	The Drowsy Chaperone
2009
2009	Steven Hoggett	Black Watch
2009	Rafael Amargo	Zorro
2009	Lynne Page	La Cage aux Folles
2009	Kate Prince	Into the Hoods
2009	Sergio Trujillo	Jersey Boys

=== 2010s ===
Year	Choreographer	Production
2010
2010	Stephen Mear	Hello, Dolly!
2010	Matthew Bourne	Oliver!
2010	Bill T. Jones	Spring Awakening
2010	Anthony Van Laast	Sister Act
2011
2011	Leon Baugh	Sucker Punch
2011	Bill T. Jones	Fela!
2011	Stephen Mear	Sweet Charity
2011	Jerry Mitchell	Legally Blonde
2012
2012	Peter Darling	Matilda
2012	Javier de Frutos	London Road
2012	Stephen Mear	Crazy for You
2012	Andrew Wright	Singin' in the Rain
2013
2013	Bill Deamer	Top Hat
2013	Scott Ambler	Chariots of Fire
2013	Scott Graham and Steven Hoggett	The Curious Incident of the Dog in the Night-Time
2013	Stephen Mear	Kiss Me, Kate
2014
2014	Casey Nicholaw	The Book of Mormon
2014	Peter Darling	Charlie and the Chocolate Factory
2014	Steven Hoggett	Once
2014	Susan Stroman	The Scottsboro Boys
2015
2015	Sergio Trujillo	Memphis
2015	Jerry Mitchell	Dirty Rotten Scoundrels
2015	Annie-B Parson	Here Lies Love
2015	Josh Prince	Beautiful
2016
2016	Drew McOnie	In the Heights
2016	Carlos Acosta and Andrew Wright	Guys and Dolls
2016	Stephen Mear	Gypsy
2016	Jerry Mitchell	Kinky Boots
2017
2017	Matthew Bourne	The Red Shoes
2017	Peter Darling and Ellen Kane	Groundhog Day
2017	Steven Hoggett	Harry Potter and the Cursed Child
2017	Drew McOnie	Jesus Christ Superstar
2018
2018	Andy Blankenbuehler	Hamilton
2018	Bill Deamer	Follies
2018	Kate Prince	Everybody's Talking About Jamie
2018	Randy Skinner	42nd Street
2018	Christopher Wheeldon	An American in Paris
2019
2019	Kelly Devine	Come from Away
2019	Christopher Gattelli	The King and I
2019	Carrie-Anne Ingrouille	Six
2019	Liam Steel	Company

=== 2020s ===
Year	Choreographer	Production
2020
2020	Matthew Bourne and Stephen Mear	Mary Poppins
2020	Fabian Aloise	Evita
2020	Matt Cole (based on original choreography by Jerome Robbins)	Fiddler on the Roof
2020	Jennifer Weber	& Juliet
2021	Not presented due to extended closing of theatre productions during COVID-19 pandemic (Note: Due to late March 2020 to late July 2021 closing of London theatre productions during the COVID-19 pandemic in England, the 2022 awards recognise productions that launched anytime from February 2020 to February 2022)	
2022
2022	Kathleen Marshall	Anything Goes
2022	Finn Caldwell	Life of Pi
2022	Julia Cheng	Cabaret
2022	Sonya Tayeh	Moulin Rouge!
2023
2023	Matt Cole	Newsies
2023	Lynne Page	Standing at the Sky's Edge
2023	Kate Prince	Sylvia
2023	Basil Twist	My Neighbour Totoro
2024
2024	Arlene Phillips with James Cousins	Guys and Dolls
2024	Fabian Aloise	Sunset Boulevard
2024	Ellen Kane & Hannes Langolf	Dear England
2024	Mark Smith	The Little Big Things
2024	Susan Stroman	Crazy for You
2025
2025	Christopher Wheeldon	MJ the Musical
2025	Matthew Bourne	Oliver!
2025	Julia Cheng	Fiddler on the Roof
2025	Hofesh Shechter	Oedipus

== Multiple awards and nominations for Best Theatre Choreographer ==
=== Awards ===
Five awards

- Matthew Bourne

Three awards

- Stephen Mear

Two awards

- Peter Darling
- Susan Stroman

=== Nominations ===
Ten nominations

- Stephen Mear

Seven nominations

- Matthew Bourne
- Peter Darling

Six nominations

- Susan Stroman

Four nominations

- Rob Ashford
- Steven Hoggett
- Jerry Mitchell

Three nominations

- Fabian Aloise
- Bill Deamer
- Arlene Phillips
- Kate Prince
- Anthony Van Laast

Two nominations

- Julia Cheng
- Matt Cole
- Javier de Frutos
- Craig Revel Horwood
- Bill T. Jones
- Ellen Kane
- Kathleen Marshall
- Rob Marshall
- Casey Nicholaw
- Lynne Page
- Dein Perry
- Ann Reinking
- Christopher Wheeldon
- Andrew Wright

== See also ==
- Drama Desk Award for Outstanding Choreography
- Tony Award for Best Choreography
