= Teneisha Bonner =

- Born: Teneisha Phehoma Bonner; 31 December 1981; St. Catherine, Jamaica
- Died: 11 September 2019 (aged 37); London, England, United Kingdom
- Education: BRIT School; London Studio Centre
- Occupation: dancer
- Years active: 1999–2019
- Career
- Former groups: Bounce Streetdance Company; ZooNation
- Dances: hip-hop dance; street dance

Teneisha Phehoma Bonner (31 December 1981 – 11 September 2019) was a Jamaican-born English hip-hop and street dancer of stage and screen. She worked with the groups ZooNation and the Bounce Streetdance Company and as a backup dancer for many top performers in the music industry. Bonner played a role in the film StreetDance 3D and danced in Mamma Mia! Here We Go Again and Mary Poppins Returns.

== Biography ==
Bonner was born in St. Catherine, Jamaica on 31 December 1981. She was the daughter of Yvette Singh and Emanuel Bonner and had four half-siblings, being the eldest child in the family. Bonner was raised by her grandmother until she moved to Peckham in London at age seven to be with her mother and stepfather. She began dancing at Brixton Recreation Centre, and after observing the dance musical Cats aged 13, was inspired to dream for a professional dance career. Bonner had her first open stage auditions with the company RJC Dance and attended local street dance classes, borrowing a key for its drama room to allow her to practice solo during intervals away from school. She joined the BRIT School in Croydon at the age of 16, and obtained her first professional work at 17, performing for the pop singer Dane Bowers, and appearing on the television programmes Top of the Pops and CD:UK, to allow her to pay the school fees.

Aged 18, Bonner was awarded a full scholarship to the London Studio Centre by its principal, with her training interrupted by her successfully auditioning for the Bounce Streetdance Company and going on a European and United Kingdom tour of the company's show Insane in The Brain. She was persuaded to completed her scholarship by her teacher after initial hesitance to do so, graduating in 2004. Bonner worked as part of a backup troupes for commercial artists such as Kylie Minogue, Rihanna, Take That, The Black Eyed Peas, Will.i.am and Alesha Dixon on tour. In 2002, she was one of the first dancers on Kate Prince's group ZooNation. Bonner was cast in the lead role of hopeful DJ girl Spinderella in the hip hop show Into the Hoods during its run at the Novello Theatre in the West End in 2008. Luke Jennings, the dance reviewer for The Observer, wrote of her performance "The piece’s star is undoubtedly Bonner, whose dramatic beauty and fluent line compel the attention whenever she’s on stage", and Katie Colombus of The Stage concurred, saying Bonner "really steals the show, dancing with an edge, an energy and sharpness that I’ve never seen before.

That same year, she performed at the 2008 Summer Olympics closing ceremony. In 2010, Bonner portrayed the hairdresser Shawna in the comedy film StreetDance 3D, and had a featured role in the Sadler's Wells Theatre production of the dance musical Shoes. She danced the role of Kerri in Some Like It Hip Hop at the Peacock Theatre in 2011, earning her the Critics' Choice National Dance Outstanding Female Performance (Modern) Award the following year, the first time the accolade went to a hip-hop dancer. She danced in the closing ceremonies of the 2012 Summer Olympics and the 2012 Summer Paralympics. In 2013, Bonner was featured in a music video of the rapper Ty's song Let's Start. She also played a role in a promotional for the pianist Fabio D'Andrea and toured worldwide with Heartbeat of Home, a Riverdance spin-off. Bonner twice played Queen of Hearts in The Mad Hatter's Tea Party at the Linbury Studio Theatre of the Royal Opera House in both 2014 and 2017. In 2018, she appeared as a dancer in Mamma Mia! Here We Go Again and Mary Poppins Returns, which were her final professional roles. Bonner also taught at ZooNation and helped Prince with television and other ventures.

== Personal life ==
Bonner was a member of Kensington Temple in Notting Hill. In 2016, she was diagnosed with breast cancer, but concealed it as she continued to work through her illness. Bonner died from the disease on 11 September 2019.

== Technique ==
She had an expertise in locking and popping, with The Daily Telegraph writing, "the minutely articulated jerky movements that travel the length of the body, conjuring effects that were athletically sharp and yet fluid and dancerly."
