= Billy Elliot the Musical Live =

- Cover for Blu-ray
- Directed by: Stephen Daldry (stage); Brett Sullivan (live film)
- Written by: Lee Hall
- Based on: Billy Elliot by Stephen Daldry
- Produced by: Tim Bevan; Eric Fellner; Jon Finn; Sally Greene; Dione Orrom (live film)
- Starring: Elliott Hanna; Ruthie Henshall; Deka Walmsley
- Edited by: Marko Keser; Guy Morley; Brett Sullivan; David Tregoning
- Music by: Elton John
- Production companies: Universal Stage Productions; Working Title Films; Old Vic Productions; Tiger Aspect
- Distributed by: Universal Pictures
- Release date: 28 September 2014
- Running time: 169 minutes
- Country: United Kingdom
- Language: English
- Box office: $3.7 million

Billy Elliot the Musical Live is a 2014 British filmed version of Elton John and Lee Hall's coming-of-age stage musical Billy Elliot the Musical (2005), which in turn was based on the 2000 film Billy Elliot. Stephen Daldry directed both the original film and the 2014 musical adaptation.

Filmed on 28 September 2014 at the Victoria Palace Theatre in London's West End, Billy Elliot Live was broadcast live to cinemas in several European countries, followed by further worldwide screenings. North American screenings took place on 12, 15, and 18 November.

The filmed production stars Elliott Hanna as Billy, Ruthie Henshall as Mrs. Wilkinson, and Deka Walmsley, Ann Emery, and Chris Grahamson as Billy's father, grandmother, and older brother, respectively.

== Plot ==
=== Act I ===
In County Durham, the 1984–85 coal miners' strike is just beginning ("The Stars Look Down"). Motherless eleven-year-old Billy is required to stay behind after his boxing class and finds his way into a ballet class run by Mrs Wilkinson. He is the only boy, but becomes attracted to the grace of the dance ("Shine"). The secret is at first easily kept, as the only person home at the time is his grandmother. She reveals her abusive relationship with her dead husband and that she too loved to dance, which made everything all right ("Grandma's Song").

While Billy's father Jackie, brother Tony and neighbours are on strike and clash with riot police, he continues to take dance lessons, keeping it a secret from his family ("Solidarity"), a number which intersperses the violent reality of the strike with the peaceful practice of ballet.

Eventually, Jackie discovers Billy in the ballet class and forbids him from attending the lessons. Mrs Wilkinson, who recognizes Billy's talent, privately suggests that he should audition for the Royal Ballet School in London. To prepare for the audition, she offers free private lessons. Billy is not sure what he wants to do so he visits his best friend Michael for advice. He finds Michael wearing a dress. He persuades Billy to have fun with him by dressing up in women's clothing and disdaining the restrictive inhibitions of their working class community ("Expressing Yourself").

Billy arrives for his first private ballet lesson bringing with him things to inspire a special dance for the audition ("Dear Billy (Mum's Letter)"). He begins learning from and bonding with Mrs Wilkinson while he develops an impressive routine for his audition ("Born to Boogie"). Mrs Wilkinson's daughter Debbie tries to discourage Billy because she has a crush on him. Meanwhile, Jackie and Tony are engaged in daily battles with riot police that often turn bloody. They struggle to support the family with very little strike and union pay, a difficult task that goes on for nearly a year.

=== Act II ===
Six months later, at the miners' annual Christmas show, the children put on a show disparaging Prime Minister Margaret Thatcher, who is seen as the antagonist by the coal miners ("Merry Christmas, Maggie Thatcher"). Jackie gets drunk and sings an old folk song that elicits memories of his deceased wife and the usually stoic man leaves in tears ("Deep Into the Ground"). Left alone with Billy in the community centre, Michael reveals he has feelings for him, but Billy explains that the fact that he likes ballet does not mean that he is gay. Michael gives him a kiss on the cheek. Michael tries to get Billy to show him some dancing, but Billy is sad and just tells him to leave.

Michael departs, but leaves a music player running. Billy feels like dancing for the first time since the day of the aborted audition and dances while dreaming of being a grown-up dancer ("Dream Ballet"). Unknown to Billy, his father arrives and watches him dance. Overcome with emotion, his father goes to Mrs Wilkinson's house to discuss Billy's prospects as a dancer. She confirms Billy's talent, but is not sure whether or not he would get into the Royal Ballet School. Mrs Wilkinson offers to help pay for the trip to London for the audition, but Jackie refuses. He leaves questioning his working-class pride and the future of mining for his boys.

Jackie decides the only way to help Billy is to return to work. When Tony sees his father cross the picket line, he becomes infuriated and the two argue over what is more important: unity of the miners or helping Billy achieve his dream ("He Could Be A Star"). The argument eventually comes to blows and Billy is accidentally hit. One of the miners chastises them for fighting and says that the important thing is looking after the child. One by one, the miners give money to help pay for the trip to the audition, but Billy still does not have enough for the bus fare to London. A strike-breaker arrives and offers him hundreds of pounds. An enraged Tony attempts to shun his donation, but no one else speaks up in his support. Now drained of hope, Tony dismally ponders whether there's a point for anything any more, and runs off.

Billy and his father arrive at the Royal Ballet School for the audition. While Jackie waits outside, an upper-crust Londoner highlights the contrast between the Elliots and the families of the other applicants. Jackie meets a dancer with a thick Scottish accent. The dancer confesses that his father does not support his ballet career. He sharply advises Jackie to "get behind" his boy. Billy nervously finishes the audition with a sinking feeling that he did not do well. As he packs his gear, he lets that emotion overwhelm him and he punches another dancer who was trying to comfort him. The audition committee reminds Billy of the strict standards of the school. They have received an enthusiastic letter from Mrs Wilkinson explaining Billy's background and situation, and they ask him to describe what it feels like when he dances. Billy responds with a heartfelt declaration of his passion ("Electricity").

Back in Durham, the Elliots resume life, but times are tough and the miners are running a soup kitchen to ensure everyone is fed. Eventually, Billy receives a letter from the school and, overwhelmed and fearful, knowing that it heralds the end of the life he has known, informs his family that he wasn't accepted. Tony retrieves the letter from the waste bin and discovers that his brother was accepted. At the same time, the miners' union has caved in; they lost the strike. Billy visits Mrs Wilkinson at the dance class to thank her for everything she did to help him. Debbie is sad that Billy will be leaving.

Billy packs his things for the trip to the school and says goodbye to the soon to be unemployed miners who are unhappily returning to work ("Once We Were Kings"). Billy says goodbye to his dead mother, who often visits him in his imagination ("Dear Billy (Billy's Reply)"). Michael arrives to say goodbye and Billy gives him a kiss on the cheek. Billy takes his suitcase and walks out to his future alone.

The entire cast comes out on stage and calls Billy back to celebrate the bright future ahead of him ("Finale").

== Cast ==
- Elliott Hanna as Billy Elliot
- Ruthie Henshall as Sandra Wilkinson
- Deka Walmsley as Jackie Elliot
- Ann Emery as Grandma
- Chris Grahamson as Tony Elliot
- Zach Atkinson as Michael Caffrey
- Liam Mower as Older Billy
- David Muscat as Mr. Braithwaite
- Claudia Bradley as Mrs. Elliot
- Howard Crossley as George
- Demi Lee as Debbie Wilkinson
- Alan Mehdizadeh as Big Davey
- Liam Sargeant as Small boy
- Caspar Meurisse as Tall boy
- David Stoller as Scab / Posh Dad
- Rueben Williams as Riot Officer

Ballet girls

- Niamh Bennett
- Ella Forman
- Imogen Gurney
- Lauren Henson
- Imogen Kingsley Smith
- Erin McIver
- Syakira Moeladi
- Natasha Pye
- Charlotte Ross-Gower
- Sophie Smart

Billy's Past & Present (special finale)

(bow order matching dates of tenure)

- Liam Mower
- George Maguire
- James Lomas
- Leon Cooke
- Matthew Koon
- Dean McCarthy
- Layton Williams
- Joshua Fedrick
- Fox Jackson-Keen
- Tom Holland
- Corey Dodd
- Ollie Gardner
- Rhys Yeomans
- Aaron Watson
- Scott McKenzie
- Josh Baker
- Ryan Collinson
- Kaine Ward
- Harris Beattie
- Harrison Dowzell
- Redmand Rance
- Ali Rasul
- Elliott Hanna
- Bradley Perret
- Matteo Zecca
- Ollie Jochim

== Musical numbers ==
Act I

- "The Stars Look Down" – Company
- "Shine" – Ballet Girls, Mrs. Wilkinson, and Mr Braithwaite
- "Grandma's Song" – Grandma
- "Solidarity" – Ballet Girls, Billy, Mrs. Wilkinson, Miners, and Police
- "Expressing Yourself" – Billy, Michael, and Ensemble
- "The Letter (Mum's Letter)" – Mrs. Wilkinson, Mum, and Billy
- "Born to Boogie" – Mrs. Wilkinson, Billy, and Mr. Braithwaite
- "Angry Dance" – Billy and Male Ensemble

Act II

- "Merry Christmas, Maggie Thatcher" – Tony and Partiers
- "Deep Into the Ground" – Jackie
- "Dream Ballet" – Billy and Older Billy
- "He Could Be a Star" – Jackie, Tony, and Miners
- "Electricity" – Billy
- "Once We Were Kings" – Company
- "The Letter (Billy's Reply)" – Billy and Mum
- Finale – Company

== Release ==
Billy Elliot the Musical Live topped the UK and Ireland box office the weekend it was broadcast, a first for an event cinema release, beating The Equalizer with £1.9 million ($3,094,159).

== Home media ==
The film was released 24 November 2014 on DVD and Blu-ray in the United Kingdom. This release differs slightly from what was originally theatrically broadcast in that certain camera angles were changed and that it incorporates shots from a practice shoot the day prior to the original live broadcast. It was released on DVD and Blu-ray in the United States on 13 October 2015.
