= Laurence Olivier Award for Best Actor in a Musical =

Annual award for London theatre

- Awarded for: Best Actor in a Musical
- Location: England
- Presented by: Society of London Theatre
- First award: 1979
- Currently held by: James Hameed and Arti Shah for Paddington: The Musical (2026)
- Website: officiallondontheatre.com/olivier-awards/

The Laurence Olivier Award for Best Actor in a Musical is an annual award presented by the Society of London Theatre in recognition of the "world-class status of London theatre." The awards were established as the Society of West End Theatre Awards in 1976, and renamed in 1984 in honour of English actor and director Laurence Olivier.

This award was introduced in 1979, along with the award for Best Actress in a Musical. In 1977 and 1978, there had been a commingled actor/actress award for Best Performance in a Musical, won both times by an actress.

== Winners and nominees ==
=== 1970s ===
Year	Actor	Musical	Character
1979	Anton Rodgers	Songbook	Various Characters
1979	Tony Britton	My Fair Lady	Henry Higgins
1979	Michael Crawford	Charlie and Algernon	Charlie
1979	Ben Cross	Chicago	Billy Flynn

=== 1980s ===
Year	Actor	Musical	Character
1980	Denis Quilley	Sweeney Todd: The Demon Barber of Fleet Street	Sweeney Todd
1980	Tom Conti	They're Playing Our Song	Vernon
1980	John Diedrich	Oklahoma!	Curly McLain
1980	Denis Lawson	Pal Joey	Joey
1981	Michael Crawford	Barnum	P.T. Barnum
1981	Brian Blessed	Cats	Old Deuteronomy
1981	Henderson Forsythe	The Best Little Whorehouse in Texas	Sheriff Ed Earl Dodd
1981	Wayne Sleep	Cats	Mister Mistoffolees
1982	Roy Hudd	Underneath the Arches	Bud Flanagan
1982	Tim Curry	The Pirates of Penzance	The Pirate King
1982	Bob Hoskins	Guys and Dolls	Nathan Detroit
1982	Stephen Moore	Poppy	Jack Idle
1983	Denis Lawson	Mr. Cinders	Jim Lancaster
1983	George Costigan	Blood Brothers	Mickey
1983	Teddy Kempner	Snoopy	Snoopy
1983	Peter Woodward	Bashville	Cashel Byron
1984	Paul Clarkson	The Hired Man	John Tallentire
1984	Tim Flavin	On Your Toes	Junior
1984	David Kernan	The Ratepayers' Iolanthe	The Lord Chancellor
1984	Lon Satton	Starlight Express	Poppa
1985	Robert Lindsay	Me and My Girl	Bill Snibson
1985	Alun Armstrong	Les Misérables	M. Thénardier
1985	Mark McGann	Lennon	John Lennon
1985	Colm Wilkinson	Les Misérables	Jean Valjean
1986	Michael Crawford	The Phantom of the Opera	The Phantom of the Opera
1986	Paul Bentley	H.M.S. Pinafore	Captain Corcoran
1986	George Hearn	La Cage aux Folles	Albin
1986	Tommy Körberg	Chess	The Russian
1987	John Bardon	Kiss Me, Kate	Gangster 1
1987	Emil Wolk	Kiss Me, Kate	Gangster 2
1987	Bernard Alane	Bless the Bride	Pierre Fontaine
1987	Mark McGann	Up on the Roof	Scott
1987	Gary Olsen	Up on the Roof	Keith
1988	Con O'Neill	Blood Brothers	Mickey
1988	Bille Brown	The Wizard of Oz	Miss Gulch / The Wicked Witch of the West
1988	Nickolas Grace	Candide	Voltaire / Dr. Pangloss
1988	Mickey Rooney	Sugar Babies	Mickey
1989/90	Jonathan Pryce	Miss Saigon	The Engineer
1989/90	Alun Armstrong	The Baker's Wife	Aimable
1989/90	Matthew Devitt	Return to the Forbidden Planet	Cookie
1989/90	Paul Hipp	Buddy – The Buddy Holly Story	Buddy Holly

=== 1990s ===
Year	Actor	Musical	Character
1991	Philip Quast	Sunday in the Park with George	George
1991	Ian Bartholomew	Into the Woods	The Baker
1991	Bruce Hubbard	Show Boat	Joe
1991	Paul J. Medford	Five Guys Named Moe	Little Moe
1992	Alan Bennett	Talking Heads	Graham Whittaker
1992	Philip Bird	Good Rockin' Tonite	Unknown
1992	Jason Donovan	Joseph and the Amazing Technicolor Dreamcoat	Joseph
1992	Damon Evans	Carmen Jones	Joe
1993	Henry Goodman	Assassins	Charles Guiteau
1993	Brent Carver	Kiss of the Spider Woman	Molina
1993	Michael Hayden	Carousel	Billy Bigelow
1993	Kirby Ward	Crazy for You	Bobby Child
1994	Alun Armstrong	Sweeney Todd: The Demon Barber of Fleet Street	Sweeney Todd
1994	Roger Allam	City of Angels	Stone
1994	David Burt	The Beggar's Opera	Captain Macheath
1994	Alan Cumming	Cabaret	Emcee
1995	John Gordon Sinclair	She Loves Me	Georg
1995	Peter Duncan	The Card	Denry Machin
1995	Tim Flavin	Crazy for You	Bobby Child
1995	Jonathan Pryce	Oliver!	Fagin
1996	Adrian Lester	Company	Robert
1996	Brian Conley	Jolson	Al Jolson
1996	Ross Lehman	Hot Mikado	Koko
1996	Clarke Peters	Unforgettable	Nat King Cole
1997	Robert Lindsay	Oliver!	Fagin
1997	Iain Glen	Martin Guerre	Martin Guerre
1997	Paul Keating	Tommy	Tommy
1997	Steven Pacey	By Jeeves	Bertie Wooster
1998	Philip Quast	The Fix	Grahame Chandler
1998	John Barrowman	The Fix	Cal Chandler
1998	Henry Goodman	Chicago	Billy Flynn
1998	Andrew C Wadsworth	Kiss Me, Kate	Fred Graham
1999	Entire Cast	Kat and the Kings	Entire Cast
1999	Adam Garcia	Saturday Night Fever	Tony Manero
1999	Hugh Jackman	Oklahoma!	Curly McLain
1999	Clarke Peters	Chicago	Billy Flynn

=== 2000s ===
Year	Actor	Musical	Character
2000	Simon Russell Beale	Candide	Voltaire / Dr. Pangloss
2000	Rob Edwards	The Lion King	Scar
2000	Daniel Evans	Candide	Candide
2000	Ben Keaton	Animal Crackers	Spaulding
2000	Gus MacGregor	Buddy	Buddy Holly
2001	Daniel Evans	Merrily We Roll Along	Charley
2001	Jimmy Johnston	The Pirates of Penzance	The Pirate King
2001	Paul Robinson	Singin' in the Rain	Don Lockwood
2001	David Shannon	The Beautiful Game	John
2002	Philip Quast	South Pacific	Emile de Becque
2002	Brent Barrett	Kiss Me, Kate	Fred Graham
2002	Paul Keating	Closer to Heaven	Straight Dave
2002	Jonathan Pryce	My Fair Lady	Henry Higgins
2003	Alex Jennings	My Fair Lady	Henry Higgins
2003	Tim Flavin	My One and Only	Captain Billy Buck Chandler
2003	Michael Jibson	Our House	Joe Casey
2003	Euan Morton	Taboo	George
2004	David Bedella	Jerry Springer	Warm Up Man / Satan
2004	Graham Bickley	Ragtime	Tateh
2004	Michael Brandon	Jerry Springer	Jerry Springer
2004	Kevyn Morrow	Ragtime	Coalhouse
2005	Nathan Lane	The Producers	Max Bialystock
2005	Lee Evans	The Producers	Leo Bloom
2005	Paul Hegarty	Sweeney Todd: The Demon Barber of Fleet Street	Sweeney Todd
2005	Gavin Lee	Mary Poppins	Bert
2006	James Lomas, George Maguire and Liam Mower	Billy Elliot	Billy Elliot
2006	Douglas Hodge	Guys and Dolls	Nathan Detroit
2006	Ewan McGregor	Guys and Dolls	Sky Masterson
2007	Daniel Evans	Sunday in the Park with George	George
2007	Tim Curry	Spamalot	King Arthur
2007	Clarke Peters	Porgy and Bess	Porgy
2007	Philip Quast	Evita	Juan Perón
2008	Michael Ball	Hairspray	Edna Turnblad
2008	Bertie Carvel	Parade	Leo
2008	Henry Goodman	Fiddler on the Roof	Tevye
2008	Bob Martin	The Drowsy Chaperone	Man in Chair
2009	Douglas Hodge	La Cage aux Folles	Albin
2009	Denis Lawson	La Cage aux Folles	Georges
2009	Ryan Molloy	Jersey Boys	Frankie Valli
2009	Matt Rawle	Zorro	Zorro

=== 2010s ===
Year	Actor	Musical	Character
2010	Aneurin Barnard	Spring Awakening	Melchior Gabor
2010	Rowan Atkinson	Oliver!	Fagin
2010	Bob Golding	Morecambe	Eric Morecambe
2010	Alexander Hanson	A Little Night Music	Frederik
2010	Tony Sheldon	Priscilla, Queen of the Desert	Bernadette
2011	David Thaxton	Passion	Giorgio
2011	Alex Gaumond	Legally Blonde	Emmett Forrest
2011	Ramin Karimloo	Love Never Dies	The Phantom
2011	Sahr Ngaujah	Fela!	Fela Kuti
2011	Michael Xavier	Love Story	Oliver Barratt IV
2012	Bertie Carvel	Matilda	Miss Trunchbull
2012	Nigel Lindsay	Shrek	Shrek
2012	Reece Shearsmith	Betty Blue Eyes	Gilbert Chilvers
2012	Paulo Szot	South Pacific	Emile de Becque
2013	Michael Ball	Sweeney Todd: The Demon Barber of Fleet Street	Sweeney Todd
2013	Alex Bourne	Kiss Me, Kate	Fred Graham
2013	Tom Chambers	Top Hat	Jerry
2013	Will Young	Cabaret	The Master of Ceremonies
2014	Gavin Creel	The Book of Mormon	Elder Price
2014	Jared Gertner	The Book of Mormon	Elder Cunningham
2014	Douglas Hodge	Charlie and the Chocolate Factory	Willy Wonka
2014	Kyle Scatliffe	The Scottsboro Boys	Haywood Patterson
2015	John Dagleish	Sunny Afternoon	Ray Davies
2015	Jon Jon Briones	Miss Saigon	The Engineer
2015	Brandon Victor Dixon	The Scottsboro Boys	Haywood Patterson
2015	Killian Donnelly	Memphis	Huey Calhoun
2016	Matt Henry	Kinky Boots	Lola / Simon
2016	Ian Bartholomew	Mrs Henderson Presents	Vivian Van Damm
2016	Killian Donnelly	Kinky Boots	Charlie Price
2016	David Haig	Guys and Dolls	Nathan Detroit
2016	Jamie Parker	Guys and Dolls	Sky Masterson
2017	Andy Karl	Groundhog Day	Phil Connors
2017	David Fynn	School of Rock	Dewey Finn
2017	Tyrone Huntley	Jesus Christ Superstar	Judas Iscariot
2017	Charlie Stemp	Half a Sixpence	Arthur Kipps
2018	Giles Terera	Hamilton	Aaron Burr
2018	Ciarán Hinds	Girl from the North Country	Nick Lane
2018	John McCrea	Everybody's Talking About Jamie	Jamie New
2018	Jamael Westman	Hamilton	Alexander Hamilton
2019	Kobna Holdbrook-Smith	Tina	Ike Turner
2019	Marc Antolin	Little Shop of Horrors	Seymour Krelborn
2019	Zubin Varla	Fun Home	Bruce Bechdel
2019	Ken Watanabe	The King and I	The King of Siam

=== 2020s ===
Year	Actor	Musical	Character
2020	Sam Tutty	Dear Evan Hansen	Evan Hansen
2020	Andy Nyman	Fiddler on the Roof	Tevye
2020	Charlie Stemp	Mary Poppins	Bert
2020	Jac Yarrow	Joseph and the Amazing Technicolor Dreamcoat	Joseph
2021	Not presented due to extended closing of theatre productions during COVID-19 pandemic (Note: Due to late March 2020 to late July 2021 closing of London theatre productions during the COVID-19 pandemic in England, the 2022 awards recognise productions that launched anytime from February 2020 to February 2022)		
2022	Eddie Redmayne	Cabaret	Emcee
2022	Olly Dobson	Back to the Future: The Musical	Marty McFly
2022	Arinzé Kene	Get Up, Stand Up! The Bob Marley Musical	Bob Marley
2022	Robert Lindsay	Anything Goes	Moonface Martin
2023	Arthur Darvill	Oklahoma!	Curly McLain
2023	Alon Abutbul	The Band's Visit	Tewfiq
2023	Julian Ovenden	South Pacific	Emile de Becque
2023	Andrew Rannells	Tammy Faye	Jim Bakker
2024
2024	Tom Francis	Sunset Boulevard	Joe Gillis
2024	David Cumming	Operation Mincemeat	Charles Cholmondeley, Doctor Pobil & Others
2024	Daniel Mays	Guys and Dolls	Nathan Detroit
2024	Charlie Stemp	Crazy for You	Bobby Child
2025
2025	John Dagleish	The Curious Case of Benjamin Button	Benjamin Button
2025	Adam Dannheisser	Fiddler on the Roof	Tevye
2025	Myles Frost	MJ the Musical	Michael Jackson
2025	Simon Lipkin	Oliver!	Fagin
2025	Jamie Muscato	Natasha, Pierre & The Great Comet of 1812	Anatole Kuragin
2026
2026	James Hameed and Arti Shah	Paddington: The Musical	Paddington
2026	Marc Antolin	The Producers	Leo Bloom
2026	Andy Nyman	The Producers	Max Bialystock
2026	Jamie Parker	Into The Woods	The Baker
2026	Diego Andres Rodriguez	Evita	Che

== Multiple awards and nominations for Best Actor ==
=== Awards ===
==== Three awards ====
- Philip Quast

==== Two awards ====
- Michael Ball
- Michael Crawford
- Robert Lindsay
- Daniel Evans
- John Dagleish

=== Nominations ===
==== Four nominations ====
- Philip Quast

==== Three nominations ====
- Alun Armstrong
- Michael Crawford
- Daniel Evans
- Tim Flavin
- Henry Goodman
- Douglas Hodge
- Denis Lawson
- Robert Lindsay
- Clarke Peters
- Jonathan Pryce
- Charlie Stemp

==== Two nominations ====
- Michael Ball
- Ian Bartholomow
- Bertie Carvel
- Tim Curry
- Killian Donnelly
- Paul Keating
- Mark McGann
- Andy Nyman
- Marc Antolin
- Jamie Parker

== Multiple awards and nominations for a character ==
=== Awards ===
==== 3 awards ====
- Sweeney Todd from Sweeney Todd: The Demon Barber of Fleet Street

==== 2 awards ====
- George from Sunday in the Park with George

=== Nominations ===
==== 4 nominations ====
- Fagin from Oliver!
- Nathan Detroit from Guys and Dolls
- Sweeney Todd from Sweeney Todd: The Demon Barber of Fleet Street

==== 3 nominations ====
- Billy Flynn from Chicago
- Bobby Child from Crazy for You
- Curly McLain from Oklahoma!
- Emcee in Cabaret
- Emile de Becque from South Pacific
- Fred Graham from Kiss Me, Kate
- Henry Higgins from My Fair Lady
- Tevye from Fiddler on the Roof

==== 2 nominations ====
- Albin from La Cage aux Folles
- Bert from Mary Poppins
- George from Sunday in the Park with George
- Haywood Patterson from The Scottsboro Boys
- Joseph from Joseph and the Amazing Technicolor Dreamcoat
- Mickey from Blood Brothers
- Sky Masterson from Guys and Dolls
- The Engineer from Miss Saigon
- The Pirate King from The Pirates of Penzance

== See also ==
- Best Actor
- Drama Desk Award for Outstanding Actor in a Leading Role in a Musical
- Lists of acting awards
- Tony Award for Best Actor in a Leading Role in a Musical
