= 2006 WhatsOnStage Awards =

British theatre awards

The WhatsOnStage Awards, founded in 2001 as the Theatregoers' Choice Awards, are a fan-driven set of awards organised by the theatre website WhatsOnStage.com, based on a popular vote recognising performers and productions of English theatre, with an emphasis on London's West End theatre.

The results of the 2006 Whatsonstage Awards were:

Category	Winner	% of Vote
Best Actress in a Play	Kristin Scott Thomas - As You Desire Me at the Playhouse	24%
Best Actor in a Play	Kevin Spacey - Richard II at the Old Vic	24%
Best Supporting Actress in a Play	Suranne Jones - A Few Good Men at the Theatre Royal Haymarket	23%
Best Supporting Actor in a Play	Anthony Head - Otherwise Engaged at the Criterion	29%
Best Actress in a Musical	Jane Krakowski - Guys & Dolls at the Piccadilly	27%
Best Actor in a Musical	Ewan McGregor - Guys & Dolls at the Piccadilly	40%
Best Supporting Actress in a Musical	Ann Emery - Billy Elliot at the Victoria Palace	23%
Best Supporting Actor in a Musical	Martyn Ellis - Guys & Dolls at the Piccadilly	24%
Best Solo Performance	Megan Dodds - My Name Is Rachel Corrie at the Royal Court	37%
Best Ensemble Performance	Heroes - at Wyndham’s	22%
Best Takeover in a Role	Michael Ball - The Woman in White at the Palace	24%
Best New Play	My Name Is Rachel Corrie developed by Katharine Viner & Alan Rickman - at the Royal Court	39%
Best New Comedy	Who's the Daddy? by Lloyd Evans & Toby Young - at the King’s Head	22%
Best New Musical	Billy Elliot - The Musical by Elton John & Lee Hall - at the Victoria Palace	40%
The Samuel French Best Play Revival	Death of a Salesman - at the Lyric	31%
Best Musical Revival	Guys & Dolls - at the Piccadilly	51%
Best Shakespearean Production	Richard II - at the Old Vic	26%
The London Calling Best Director	Alan Rickman - My Name Is Rachel Corrie at the Royal Court	41%
Best Set Designer	Bob Crowley - Mary Poppins at the Prince Edward	29%
Best Choreographer	Peter Darling - Billy Elliot at the Victoria Place	31%
The MS London Newcomer of the Year	George Maguire, James Lomas & Liam Mower (actors) - Billy Elliot at the Victoria Palace	45%
Best Off-West End Production	Sunday in the Park with George at the Menier Chocolate Factory	34%
Best Regional Production	How to Succeed in Business Without Really Trying - at Chichester Festival Theatre	23%
The Planet Hollywood Theatre Event of the Year	Ian McKellen making his panto dame debut in Aladdin	32%
