= George Maguire (actor, born 1990) =

British actor

- Born: George Maguire; 11 December 1990 (age 35); Stanford-Le-Hope, Essex, England
- Years active: 2005–present
- Awards: Theatre Goers Choice Award Newcomer of the year 2006; Laurence Olivier Award for Best Actor in a Musical 2006

George Maguire (born 11 December 1990) is an English actor, known for being one of the three original cast members who carried the title role in Billy Elliot the Musical, which earned the Laurence Olivier Award for Best Actor in a Leading Role in a Musical, becoming one of the youngest winners of the award.

== Acting career ==
Maguire performed the role of "Billy" for the opening night performance 12 May 2005, and continued performing until 17 December 2005, when he left the cast. He was replaced by Travis Yates. Together with his two original cast mates James Lomas and Liam Mower, he alternated in the role of Billy, and after leaving, performed again in a first anniversary Gala show of Billy Elliot the Musical on 12 May 2006.

He won, jointly with Lomas and Mower, the Theatre Goers' Choice Award 2006 for The Most Promising Newcomer, as well as - unique in British theatre history - again jointly with his two castmates, the Laurence Olivier Award for Best Actor in a Leading Role in a Musical in 2006. It is partly due to their outstanding performances, that Billy Elliot the Musical has won several awards: The Evening Standard Award 2005, the Critics' Circle Theatre Award 2005, the WhatsOnStage Theatre Goers' Choice Award 2006, and the Laurence Olivier Award 2006, all for best British Musical.

Maguire was featured as a guest on Ready, Steady, Cook (he won the episode against his close friend Leon Cooke who also played Billy Elliot) and in several morning TV shows, TV interviews, and short clips related to the musical. From 2005 to 2008 he worked as a moderator, moderating and supporting several Mardi Gras dance shows of British dance schools - The Stars in the Round at the Royal Albert Hall and The Stars in Your Eyes at Sadler's Wells Theatre, London.

In April 2009 he appeared in the ITV zombie comedy Renaissance (starring Kelly Brook and Alan Dale) - playing Tim, the son of Dale's character. The story told of the making of Renaissance and was part of the ITV drama Moving Wallpaper.

In 2014 he made a cameo appearance in the finale of Billy Elliot the Musical Live.

He became a member of the actors' union Equity as George Maguire, however, another actor of the same name has been working in the West End since 1995, which has led to some confusion on the internet.

== See also ==
- List of British actors
