= Jason Pennycooke =

British actor and choreographer

Jason Pennycooke is a British actor and choreographer best known for his work in musical theatre. He won a WhatsOnStage Award and received Laurence Olivier Award nominations.

== Career ==
Brought up in Leeds, Pennycooke trained for a dance career at the Northern School of Contemporary Dance in Leeds and at the London Studio Centre.

In 2008, he played the role of Jacob in the Menier Chocolate Factory production La Cage aux Folles. The production subsequently transferred to the West End at the Playhouse Theatre, and he was nominated for the Laurence Olivier Award for Best Performance in a Supporting Role in a Musical.

He provided choreography and musical staging for the musical Soul Sister, which opened at the Hackney Empire in 2012, before playing in the West End at the Savoy Theatre and touring the UK. He choreographed and starred in The Big Life which played at the Apollo Theatre in the West End in 2005. He was nominated for Best Choreographer in a Musical at the 2006 WhatsOnStage Awards and was also nominated for Best New Musical at the 2006 Laurence Olivier Awards. He also choreographed Porgy and Bess which played at Savoy Theatre 2006 and was nominated for Best New Musical at the 2007 Laurence Olivier Awards.

In 2014 he played Bobby in the West End production of Memphis. He was nominated for the Laurence Olivier Award for Best Actor in a Supporting Role in a Musical for his performance. He joined the company of Guys and Dolls when the revival transferred to the Phoenix Theatre in March 2016, playing Benny.

He was cast in the dual roles of Marquis de Lafayette and Thomas Jefferson in the West End production of Hamilton, in the original West End Cast, which began previews in December 2017. He was nominated for the Laurence Olivier Award for Best Actor in a Supporting Role in a Musical for his performance, along with fellow Hamilton cast members, Cleve September and Michael Jibson.

In 2019, Pennycooke played Wilson in the musical drama Rocketman and in 2020, JJ in the BBC Comedy TV Pilot Bumps.

In 2022, Pennycooke performed as Henri de Toulouse-Lautrec in Moulin Rouge! at the Piccadilly Theatre in the West End. He was a part of the show’s original West End Cast. The show was extended until July 2022.

In 2023, he appeared as 'Other Samuel' in BBC One miniseries Boat Story.
