= Alex Gaumond =

Canadian/British actor

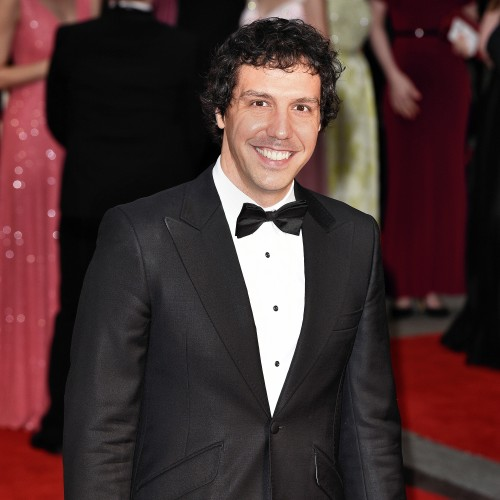
- Alex Gaumond on the red carpet at the Olivier Awards 2016
- Born: Alexandre Gaumond; 9 April 1978 (age 48); Montreal, Quebec, Canada
- Occupations: Actor; singer; songwriter; filmmaker
- Years active: 2000–present
- Website: www.alexgaumond.com

Alex Gaumond (born 9 April 1978) is a Canadian actor, singer, songwriter and filmmaker best known for his involvement in West End theatre. He plays series regular gendarme Caron, the chief of police in Sainte Victoire, in the Channel 5 television series The Madame Blanc Mysteries, starring Sally Lindsay.

On stage, Gaumond is best known for playing the leading roles of Galileo in the Queen musical We Will Rock You, Emmett in the original London production of Legally Blonde and Miss Trunchbull in the RSC's Matilda.

== Early life ==
Gaumond was born in Montreal, Quebec, Canada to French speaking parents.

He moved to the UK in 1997 to study at Guildford School of Acting where he graduated with a 1st class BA (Hons) in 2000.

== Stage career ==
=== 2000–01 (Miss Saigon) ===
After completing his degree at GSA in 2000, Gaumond made his professional debut that very same year in the ensemble of Miss Saigon in the Philippines. Gaumond also understudied the leading role of Chris in that production and went on to perform in the same musical in Hong Kong and Singapore in 2001.

=== 2002–04 (The Full Monty) ===
2002 saw Gaumond make his professional West End debut at the Prince Of Wales Theatre where he understudied the roles of Malcolm, Jerry and Ethan in The Full Monty. He then played the role of Malcolm in the 2004 UK touring production.

=== 2002–09 ===
Between 2002 and 2009 Gaumond made a number of appearances in a variety of UK national tours and London shows, including Guys And Dolls (Donmar Warehouse production), Desperately Seeking Susan and Sunday in the Park With George (5 times Olivier Award winning production).

He also played the role of Tom Jenkins in Scrooge at the London Palladium. During this show he recorded a cast album with the show's star, British icon Tommy Steele.

=== 2009 (We Will Rock You) ===
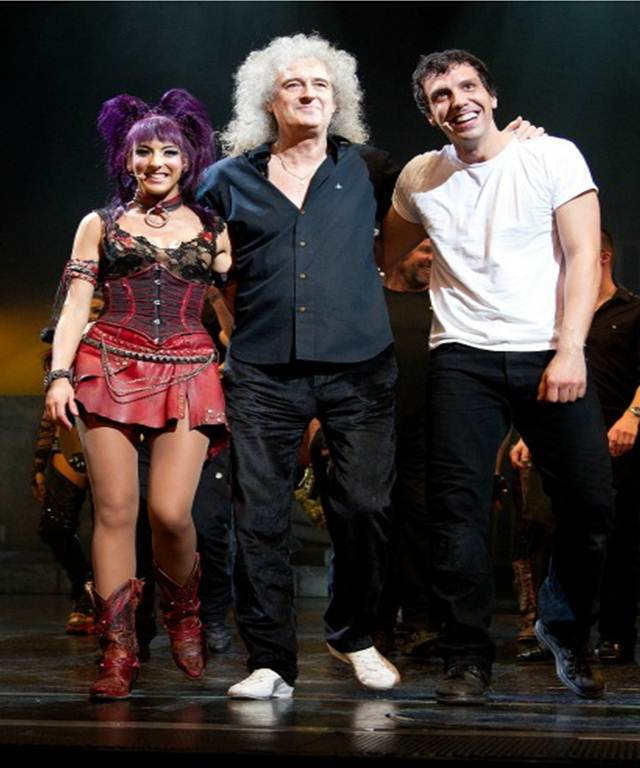
Gaumond (right) with guitarist Brian May (centre) and co-star Sabrina Aloueche (left)

In 2009 Gaumond was cast by Ben Elton, Brian May and Roger Taylor to play the lead role of Galileo Figaro in the first UK tour of their co-written musical We Will Rock You based on hit songs by the rock band Queen. During the 7-month tour Gaumond played at the Palace Theatre in Manchester, the Sunderland Empire, the Birmingham Hippodrome and the Bristol Hippodrome.

=== 2010–11 (Legally Blonde) ===
In 2009, Gaumond was cast to play the male lead (Emmett) in the original UK production of Legally Blonde alongside Sheridan Smith as Elle Woods at the Savoy Theatre in London in January 2010. He starred in the multi-award winning production for 20 months and his portrayal of the role earned him nominations for 'Best Actor in a Musical' in both the WhatsOnStage Awards 2011 and the Olivier Awards 2011.

An album of the Original London Cast featuring Gaumond, Sheridan Smith and Duncan James was recorded live during performances on 12, 13 and 14 June 2010. It was released on 16 August 2010 under the theatre label First Night Records.

=== 2011–13 ===
In August 2011, Gaumond reprised his role as Galileo Figaro in We Will Rock You, but this time in the Dominion Theatre production. He performed in this role until 18 February 2012 and his performance earned him a nomination for 'Best Takeover in a Role' in the WhatsOnStage Awards 2012.

In the summer of 2012, Gaumond made a small appearance on TV during Andrew Lloyd Webber's auditions for the role of 'Jesus' in his upcoming UK arena tour of the show Jesus Christ Superstar. The audition process for 'Jesus' was televised in the UK in a short series called Superstar. Gaumond reached the top 20 through the initial audition process but was sent home by Lloyd Webber just before reaching the live shows.

Shortly after this, Gaumond was then cast as Jesus by UK-based Bronowski Productions in their new production of Jesus Christ Superstar for Ljubljana Festival in Slovenia.

Gaumond also performed for the concept album for The Confession Room, released in April 2013.

In early 2013 it was announced that Gaumond would return to the West End starring as Alberto Beddini in Top Hat at the Aldwych Theatre, alongside Broadway actors Gavin Lee and Kristen Beth Williams. Gaumond performed in the show from February to August 2013. While in the show, Gaumond and his fellow cast members attended the Olivier awards 2013 which saw Top Hat win 3 major awards including Best New Musical. The show was also heavily featured in a four-part documentary on Channel 4 following West End musicals, entitled The Sound of Musicals, which aired in November and December 2013.

=== 2013–14 (Matilda) ===
In June 2013, it was announced that Gaumond would be joining the cast of the Royal Shakespeare Company's multi-award winning production of Matilda at the Cambridge Theatre, playing the iconic role of headmistress Miss Trunchbull. His first show was on 3 September 2013. During his time on the show Gaumond made many TV appearances including BBC's Children in Need and The Paul O'Grady Show on ITV, where he performed a specially conceived sketch with the show's host and guests.

On 23 February 2014 he attended the WhatsOnStage Awards, where Matilda won for 'Best West End Show'. He accepted the award with fellow cast member Haley Flaherty (Miss Honey). Gaumond also attended the Olivier Awards on 13 April 2014, where the show was nominated for the BBC Radio 2 Audience Award.

On 15 June 2014 Gaumond took part in the first 'Relaxed Performance' of Matilda. This specially adapted version of the show, developed in close collaboration with The National Autistic Society, was designed for people with autism and learning disabilities. The performance was a huge success and the RSC has plans for regular instalments every year.

Gaumond played his final show as Trunchbull on 7 September 2014. After his departure the role was handed to Craige Els.

=== 2014–2016 ===
Gaumond appeared in Dirty Rotten Scoundrels at the Savoy Theatre from 11 November 2014, replacing Rufus Hound in the role of Freddy Benson, the conman portrayed by Steve Martin in the original movie version. He starred opposite Robert Lindsay at the Savoy Theatre and played the role until the production closed in the West End on 7 March 2015.

Next, Gaumond played the role of Beadle Bamford in English National Opera's production of Sweeney Todd at the London Coliseum, opposite Bryn Terfel and Emma Thompson, from 30 March to 12 April 2015.

In April 2015, it was announced that Gaumond would star as Adam Pontipee in Seven Brides for Seven Brothers at Regent's Park Open Air Theatre, from 16 July to 29 August 2015. The original 1954 movie version of the musical, starring Howard Keel and Jane Powell, won the Academy Award for Best Scoring of a Musical Picture and was nominated for four additional awards, including Best Picture of the Year. The 2015 production starring Gaumond was nominated for 'Best Musical Revival' at the Olivier Awards 2016. Gaumond attended the ceremony with his fellow cast members at the Royal Opera House on Sunday 3 April 2016.

Gaumond was cast as the Baker in a new production of the Tony Award-winning Broadway musical Into the Woods at the Royal Exchange Theatre, Manchester, from 4 December 2015 to 16 January 2016, directed by Matthew Xia.

In May 2016, it was announced that Gaumond would play Larry Bonk in The Trial of Jane Fonda at the Park Theatre (London), from 13 July to 20 August 2016. Directed by Joe Harmston, the new play starred Hollywood icon, Academy Award nominee and Golden Globe winner, Anne Archer (Fatal Attraction; Patriot Games; Clear and Present Danger) as Jane Fonda. This also marked Gaumond's first major non-musical role in a play.

In December 2016 Gaumond played Bob Cratchit in a one-off concert version of the Broadway hit A Christmas Carol. After a decade-long success at New York City's Paramount Theatre in Madison Square Garden, the musical adaptation by Alan Menken (music) and Lynn Ahrens (lyrics) would be presented for the first time in London. The sold-out concert played at the Lyceum Theatre on Monday 19 December 2016. The London Musical Theatre Orchestra, formed of 32 musicians, performed the fully orchestrated score with a chorus and West End cast, starring Robert Lindsay as Scrooge. Gaumond and Lindsay had previously worked together in Dirty Rotten Scoundrels.

=== 2017–2020 ===
2017 marked Gaumond's debut in a Shakespeare play at the world-renowned Globe Theatre. He played Petruchio in The Taming of the Shrew at Shakespeare's Globe from 28 February to 25 March 2017.

During his run at the Globe, it was announced that Gaumond would next appear as Stuart Gellman in Caroline, or Change at Chichester Festival Theatre. The new production of the Olivier Award-winning musical was the first musical in the inaugural season of CFT's new Artistic Director, Daniel Evans. Directed by Michael Longhurst, the show played at the Minerva Theatre, Chichester from 6 May to 3 June 2017. It was the fastest selling production in CFT's history and received high critical acclaim.

In September 2017, it was announced that Gaumond's next stage appearance would be as Father/Marley in Jack Thorne's new adaptation of A Christmas Carol by Charles Dickens. Playing at The Old Vic from 20 November 2017 to 20 January 2018, the world premiere production was directed by Matthew Warchus and starred Rhys Ifans as Ebenezer Scrooge. The production officially opened on 29 November 2017 to very positive reviews. The adaptation was published by Nick Hern Books on 30 November 2017.

On 12 July 2018, it was announced that Gaumond had been cast in Marianne Elliott's highly anticipated new production of George Furth and Stephen Sondheim's Company, which played at the Gielgud Theatre from 26 September 2018. The character of Bobby was changed to Bobbie, a female role, and was played by Rosalie Craig. As a result of this, the roles of April, Marta and Kathy (who sing "You Could Drive a Person Crazy") would be re-written as Andy, PJ and Theo. In a final twist, the casting of Gaumond came with the announcement that the production would now also feature a same-sex couple for the first time, with Jonathan Bailey as cold-footed groom Jamie (originally written as the female character Amy) and Gaumond as his devoted fiancé Paul. Sondheim also approved this change and worked on the script with director Marianne Elliott to re-imagine these two characters as a gay couple. The production opened to critical acclaim, a Cast Recording of the new version was produced by Warner Music, and the new script was published by Nick Hern Books. The production was nominated for 9 Olivier Awards, including Best Musical Revival and Best Director.

On 22 July 2019 it was announced that Gaumond would be starring as Carl in the first UK Tour of What's in a Name?. Alongside Gaumond, the production also starred Joe Thomas, Laura Patch, Summer Strallen and Bo Poraj (who replaced the previously announced James Lance before rehearsals started). Adapted and directed by Jeremy Sams, the production toured the UK from September to November 2019. Due to popular demand, further touring dates for 2020 were announced on 26 November 2019, with Gaumond reprising his role. The second leg of the tour began but was halted in March 2020 because the UK went into lockdown due to the COVID-19 pandemic.

=== 2023–present day ===
After the pandemic and several television appearances, 2023 marked Gaumond's return to the stage, playing Keir Hardie in the world premiere of Sylvia at The Old Vic, from 27 January to 8 April 2023. Directed by Kate Prince, the production was initially scheduled to run until 1 April 2023 but was extended due to popular demand. Following some previews from 27 January, the production officially opened on 14 February 2023. The production was a critical and commercial success and was nominated for three Olivier Awards, including 'Best New Musical'. It was also nominated for three Black British Theatre Awards and won two awards, including 'Best Musical Production'.

In February 2026 it was announced that Gaumond would portray Jean Valjean in a French-language Quebec production of Les Misérables, directed by French director Ladislas Chollat based on his award-winning, reinvented staging from Théâtre du Châtelet in Paris. The cast also includes Dominique Côté as Javert, Klara Martel-Laroche as Fantine, Debbie Lynch-White as Madame Thénardier, Roger La Rue as Thénardier, Stanley Kassa as Enjolras (reprising his role from the Paris production), Nathan Bois-McDonald as Marius, Amélie Baland-Capdet as Cosette, Kenza Nejmi as Éponine and Renaud Paradis as the Bishop of Digne. The production is scheduled to play at the Théâtre St-Denis in Montreal from 20 June to 19 July 2026, followed by performances at the Grand Théâtre de Québec from 7 to 22 August 2026.

== Filmography ==
Year	Name	Role
2025	I Live Here Now	Dr. Neltman
2024	The Franchise	Justin
2022	The Bastard Son & The Devil Himself	Sergeant
2022	Derry Girls	Rob
2021-2025	The Madame Blanc Mysteries	Caron
2021	Two and a Half Minutes	Lucas
2021	The Syndicate	Claude
2020	Death in Paradise	Oscar Samuel
2019	The Hustle	Waiter on Train
2018	My Dinner with Hervé	André Villechaize
2017	Hampstead	Mark Kasdan

== Music career ==
Gaumond headlined his first solo show on 22 May 2011 at the Leicester Square Theatre, where he performed a mix of covers and original material, as well as some duets with special guests including Ramin Karimloo.

On 24 June 2012, Gaumond released his first single "'Here I Am", a new version of the song co-written and originally performed by Bryan Adams. He launched the release of his single with a performance at West End Live in Trafalgar Square in front of 20,000 people, as one of three recording artists invited to perform their solo material amongst all the West End shows featured in the programme.

== Filmmaking ==
Gaumond produced his first short film in 2021, titled Two and a Half Minutes. Co-written by Gaumond and director Ako Mitchell, the film received its world premiere screening at the Paris Short Film Festival on 19 September 2021, where it won an Audience Award. It also won an Outstanding Achievement Award at the Berlin Flash Film Festival and a Special Mention Award at the international short film competition Global Shorts, based in Los Angeles, California, and was nominated for the San Francisco Indie Short Festival. Gaumond plays the role of Lucas in the film, and wrote and sings the main song from its soundtrack, titled "Les Amoureux".

== Major professional theatre credits ==
Start date	End date	Production	Role(s)	Venue(s)
30 September 2000	31 March 2001	Miss Saigon	Ensemble, Chris u/s	Cultural Center of the Philippines
May 2001	July 2001	Miss Saigon	Ensemble, Chris u/s	Hong Kong Cultural Centre
August 2001	October 2001	Miss Saigon	Ensemble, Chris u/s	Kallang Theatre, Singapore
3 June 2002	23 November 2002	The Full Monty	Minister, Malcolm/Jerry/Ethan u/s	Prince of Wales Theatre
April 2003	April 2003	Jesus Christ Superstar Arena Concerts	Apostle/Soldier	Scandinavium Arena Globen Arena
May 2003	December 2003	Miss Saigon	Ensemble	Birmingham Hippodrome Southampton Mayflower Theatre
5 February 2004	October 2004	The Full Monty	Malcolm MacGregor	Various Venues across UK
20 October 2005	14 January 2006	Scrooge	Tom Jenkins	London Palladium
13 May 2006	2 September 2006	Sunday in the Park with George	Swing	Wyndham's Theatre
16 September 2006	7 July 2007	Guys and Dolls	Rusty Charlie, Nathan Detroit u/s	Various Venues across UK
16 October 2007	15 December 2007	Desperately Seeking Susan	Ray Sunshine	Novello Theatre
25 March 2009	17 October 2009	We Will Rock You UK Tour	Galileo Figaro	Palace Theatre, Manchester Sunderland Empire; Birmingham Hippodrome; Bristol Hippodrome
January 2010	18 June 2011	Legally Blonde	Emmett Forrest	Savoy Theatre
8 August 2011	18 February 2012	We Will Rock You	Galileo Figaro	Dominion Theatre
20 August 2012	25 August 2012	Jesus Christ Superstar	Jesus	Ljubljana Festival, Slovenia
5 February 2013	3 August 2013	Top Hat	Alberto Beddini	Aldwych Theatre
3 September 2013	7 September 2014	Matilda	Miss Trunchbull	Cambridge Theatre
11 November 2014	7 March 2015	Dirty Rotten Scoundrels	Freddy Benson	Savoy Theatre
30 March 2015	12 April 2015	Sweeney Todd	Beadle Bamford	English National Opera London Coliseum
16 July 2015	29 August 2015	Seven Brides for Seven Brothers	Adam Pontipee	Regent's Park Open Air Theatre
4 December 2015	16 January 2016	Into the Woods	Baker	Royal Exchange Theatre, Manchester
13 July 2016	20 August 2016	The Trial of Jane Fonda	Larry Bonk	Park Theatre (London)
19 December 2016	19 December 2016	A Christmas Carol	Bob Cratchit	Lyceum Theatre
28 February 2017	25 March 2017	The Taming of the Shrew	Petruchio	Shakespeare's Globe
6 May 2017	3 June 2017	Caroline, or Change	Stuart Gellman	Chichester Festival Theatre (Minerva Theatre)
20 November 2017	20 January 2018	A Christmas Carol	Father/Marley	The Old Vic
26 September 2018	30 March 2019	Company	Paul	Gielgud Theatre
5 September 2019	14 March 2020	What's in a Name?	Carl	Various Venues across UK
27 January 2023	8 April 2023	Sylvia	Keir Hardie	The Old Vic
20 June 2026	19 July 2026	Les Misérables	Jean Valjean	Théâtre St-Denis, Montreal
7 August 2026	22 August 2026	Les Misérables	Jean Valjean	Grand Théâtre de Québec, Quebec City

== Awards and nominations ==
Year	Award	Category	Work	Role/Position	Result	Ref.
2011	WhatsOnStage Awards	Best Actor in a Musical	Legally Blonde	Emmett Forrest	Nominated	
2011	Olivier Awards	Best Actor in a Musical	Legally Blonde	Emmett Forrest	Nominated	
2012	WhatsOnStage Awards	Best Takeover in a Role	We Will Rock You	Galileo Figaro	Nominated	
2021	Berlin Flash Film Festival	Outstanding Achievement Award	Two and a Half Minutes	Producer, Writer, Composer	Won	
2021	San Francisco Indie Short Festival	Best Short Film	Two and a Half Minutes	Producer, Writer, Composer	Nominated	
2021	Paris Short Film Festival	Audience Award	Two and a Half Minutes	Producer, Writer, Composer	Won	
2021	Global Shorts, Los Angeles	Special Mention	Two and a Half Minutes	Producer, Writer, Composer	Won	
