= London Studio (disambiguation) =

London Studio is a first-party video game developer for Sony Interactive Entertainment

London Studio may also refer to:

- The London Studios, a television studio complex
- London Studio Centre, a dance and theatre school
