= 2006 Laurence Olivier Awards =

Edition of London theatre awards

- Date: 26 February 2006

The 2006 Laurence Olivier Awards were held in 2006 in London celebrating excellence in West End theatre by the Society of London Theatre.

== Winners and nominees ==
Details of winners (in bold) and nominees, in each award category, per the Society of London Theatre.

| Best New Play | Best New Musical |
|---|---|
| **On the Shore of the Wide World by Simon Stephens – National Theatre Cottesloe**; Coram Boy by Helen Edmundson – National Theatre Olivier; Harvest by Richard Bean – Royal Court; Paul by Howard Brenton – National Theatre Cottesloe | **Billy Elliot – Victoria Palace**; Acorn Antiques – Theatre Royal Haymarket; The Big Life – Apollo |
| Best Revival | Outstanding Musical Production |
| **Hedda Gabler – Almeida / Duke of York's**; Death of a Salesman – Lyric; Don Carlos – Gielgud; Mary Stuart – Donmar Warehouse / Apollo | **Guys and Dolls – Piccadilly**; H.M.S. Pinafore – Regent's Park Open Air |
| Best New Comedy | Best Entertainment |
| **Heroes by Gérald Sibleyras and Tom Stoppard – Wyndham's**; Glorious by Peter Quilter – Duchess; Shoot the Crow by Owen McCafferty – Trafalgar Studios | **Something Wicked This Way Comes – Cambridge**; Blue Man Group – New London; Ducktastic – Albery |
| Best Actor | Best Actress |
| **Brian Dennehy as Willy Loman in Death of a Salesman – Lyric**; Richard Griffiths as Henri in Heroes – Wyndham's; Derek Jacobi as King Philip II in Don Carlos – Gielgud; Con O'Neill as Joe Meek in Telstar – New Ambassadors; David Threlfall as Michael in Someone Who'll Watch Over Me – New Ambassadors | **Eve Best as Hedda Gabler Tesman in Hedda Gabler – Almeida / Duke of York's**; Clare Higgins as Linda Loman in Death of a Salesman – Lyric; Helen McCrory as Rosalind in As You Like It – Wyndham's; Janet McTeer as Mary Stuart in Mary Stuart – Donmar Warehouse / Apollo; Harriet Walter as Elizabeth in Mary Stuart – Donmar Warehouse / Apollo |
| Best Actor in a Musical | Best Actress in a Musical |
| **James Lomas, George Maguire and Liam Mower as Billy Elliot in Billy Elliot – Victoria Palace**; Douglas Hodge as Nathan Detroit in Guys and Dolls – Piccadilly; Ewan McGregor as Sky Masterson in Guys and Dolls – Piccadilly | **Jane Krakowski as Miss Adelaide in Guys and Dolls – Piccadilly**; Haydn Gwynne as Mrs. Wilkinson in Billy Elliot – Victoria Palace; Jenna Russell as Sarah Brown in Guys and Dolls – Piccadilly; Julie Walters as Mrs. Overall in Acorn Antiques – Theatre Royal Haymarket |
| Best Performance in a Supporting Role | Best Performance in a Supporting Role in a Musical |
| **Noma Dumezweni as Ruth Younger in A Raisin in the Sun – Lyric Hammersmith**; David Bradley as King Henry IV in Henry IV – National Theatre Olivier; Benedict Cumberbatch as George Tesman in Hedda Gabler – Almeida / Duke of York's; Anne Reid as Kate Elliot in Epitaph for George Dillon – Comedy; Paul Ritter as Otis Gardiner in Coram Boy – National Theatre Olivier | **Celia Imrie as Miss Babs in Acorn Antiques – Theatre Royal Haymarket**; Tameka Empson as Mrs. Aphrodite in The Big Life – Apollo; Tim Healy as Dad in Billy Elliot – Victoria Palace; Scarlett Strallen as Josephine in H.M.S. Pinafore – Regent's Park Open Air |
| Best Director | Best Theatre Choreographer |
| **Richard Eyre for Hedda Gabler – Almeida / Duke of York's**; Stephen Daldry for Billy Elliot – Victoria Palace; Michael Grandage for Don Carlos – Gielgud; Phyllida Lloyd for Mary Stuart – Donmar Warehouse / Apollo; Melly Still for Coram Boy – National Theatre Olivier | **Peter Darling for Billy Elliot – Victoria Palace**; Rob Ashford for Guys and Dolls – Piccadilly |
| Best Set Design | Best Costume Design |
| **Rob Howell for Hedda Gabler – Almeida / Duke of York's**; Ian MacNeil for Billy Elliot – Victoria Palace; Christopher Oram for Don Carlos – Gielgud | **Es Devlin for The Dog in the Manger – Playhouse**; Rob Howell for Hedda Gabler – Almeida / Duke of York's; Christopher Oram for Don Carlos – Gielgud; Anthony Ward for Mary Stuart – Donmar Warehouse / Apollo |
| Best Lighting Design | Best Sound Design |
| **Paule Constable for Don Carlos – Gielgud**; Rick Fisher for Billy Elliot – Victoria Palace; Howard Harrison for Guys and Dolls – Piccadilly; Hugh Vanstone for Mary Stuart – Donmar Warehouse / Apollo | **Paul Arditti for Billy Elliot – Victoria Palace**; Terry Jardine and Chris Full for Guys and Dolls – Piccadilly; Christopher Shutt for Coram Boy – National Theatre Olivier |
| Outstanding Achievement in Dance | Best New Dance Production |
| **Pina Bausch for conceiving Nelken and Palermo, Palermo, Tanztheater Wuppertal – Sadler's Wells**; The ensemble for their season, Cuban National Ballet – Sadler's Wells; Johan Kobborg in La Sylphide and The Lesson, The Royal Ballet – Royal Opera House; Russell Maliphant for choreographing and performing PUSH – Sadler's Wells | **PUSH – Sadler's Wells**; Constant Speed, Rambert Dance Company – Sadler's Wells; Giselle, Fabulous Beast Dance Theatre – Barbican; Zero Degrees, Akram Khan Company – Sadler's Wells |
| Outstanding Achievement in Opera | Outstanding New Opera Production |
| **Simon Keenlyside in 1984, The Royal Opera – Royal Opera House and Billy Budd, English National Opera – London Coliseum**; Carolyn Choa for choreographing and Anthony Minghella for directing Madama Butterfly, English National Opera – London Coliseum; Sarah Connolly in La clemenza di Tito, English National Opera – London Coliseum; David McVicar for directing La clemenza di Tito, English National Opera – London Coliseum | **Madama Butterfly, English National Opera – London Coliseum**; Billy Budd, English National Opera – London Coliseum; La clemenza di Tito, English National Opera – London Coliseum; On the Town, English National Opera – London Coliseum |
Outstanding Achievement in an Affiliate Theatre
**Bloody Sunday: Scenes from the Saville Inquiry – Tricycle**; Comfort Me with Apples – Hampstead; My Name Is Rachel Corrie – Royal Court; Laura Wade for writing Breathing Corpses – Royal Court and Colder Than Here – Soho
Society Special Award
**Ian McKellen**

== Productions with multiple nominations and awards ==
The following 15 productions, including three operas, received multiple nominations:

- 9: Billy Elliot
- 8: Guys and Dolls
- 6: Don Carlos, Hedda Gabler and Mary Stuart
- 4: Coram Boy
- 3: Acorn Antiques, Death of a Salesman and La clemenza di Tito
- 2: Billy Budd, Heroes, H.M.S. Pinafore, Madama Butterfly, PUSH and The Big Life

The following three productions received multiple awards:

- 4: Billy Elliot and Hedda Gabler
- 2: Guys and Dolls

== See also ==
- 60th Tony Awards
