= Mary Goodhew =

Mary Goodhew was the Artistic Director of Elmhurst Ballet School in Edgbaston, Birmingham, until she left to become director of Legat Ballet in July 2008, taking up that post in September 2008.

As a child she studied ballet in Kent with Rita Emmerson, (a former pupil of Enrico Cecchetti the Ballet Master to Diaghilev's Ballets Russes) until she was sixteen. She was a Cecchetti Society Scholar and was awarded the Cyril Beaumont Scholarship to the Royal Ballet Upper School.

While still a student she danced with The Royal Ballet at the Royal Opera House, Covent Garden and on their overseas tours. After graduation she joined Sadler's Wells Royal Ballet, (now Birmingham Royal Ballet).

She has studied ballet training methods in Russia, Europe, USA and Canada. She was invited to assess the Royal Winnipeg Ballet School for Canada Council and was an ISTD Cecchetti Examiner in Canada and the UK.

Past posts held include:

- Ballet teacher at the Royal Ballet School Upper School on the Teachers' Course and the Teachers' Course for Former Professional Dancers
- The RBS Associates in London and Leeds
- Head of the Associate School – West Street School – Covent Garden.
- Principal of the Emmerson School of Dancing
- Founder and Principal of the London Junior Ballet
- Head of the Teachers' Program and the Junior Division of the National Ballet School, Canada.
- Principal of the Northern Ballet School – Manchester
- Administrator of London Studio Centre.
- Ballet Principal of White Lodge, the Royal Ballet School's Lower School before joining Elmhurst in Autumn 2004.
- Developed and coordinated a PVP (PreVocational Programme) for Elmhurst School, which are running throughout the year.
- Appointed Director of the Legat School of Dance, announced 06-05-2008 Director of Legat Ballet
- Left Legat in January 2010, Mary is currently consulting on various ballet projects up and down the country.

She contributes a series of articles on ballet instruction for the "Dancing Times", entitled "The Making of a Dancer", which are later reprinted on the Birmingham Royal Ballet website.
