= Stephen Mear =

English dancer, choreographer and director

Stephen Leonard Mear CBE (born 1964) is an English dancer, choreographer and director best known for his award-winning work in musical theatre.

In the 1990s, Mear taught dance at the London Studio Centre. In 2005 he and co-choreographer Sir Matthew Bourne won the Laurence Olivier Award for Best Choreography, for their work on the new West End musical Mary Poppins, which they subsequently won once more for the revival of the same production in London at the 2020 Olivier Awards. This production later transferred to Broadway in 2006, being nominated for the Tony Award for Best Choreography in 2007. Mear choreographed the Broadway musical of Disney's The Little Mermaid (2007–08). Mear also Choreographed Sunset Boulevard in the West End (2016) and on Broadway (2017), starring Glenn Close. In recognition of his achievements, in 2006 and 2015 Mear was the recipient of a Carl Alan Award, an award voted for by leading dance organisations in the United Kingdom. In 2010, Stephen Mear won a Laurence Olivier Award for best Theatre Choreographer for his work on Hello Dolly at the Open Air Theatre, Regent's Park, he was also a choreographer for So You Think You Can Dance (UK), in the category broadway.

Olivier Award Nominations include; Gypsy (2016), Kiss Me Kate (2013), Crazy for You (2012), Sweet Charity (2011), Sinatra (2007), Singin' in the Rain (2001) and Soul Train (2000).

TV credits include; The Tracey Ullman Show – (Library number – BBC1 2016), Gypsy – Live at the Savoy (BBC4 2015), The Vote – Donmar Warehouse Live on More4 (UK Election night 2015), Psychobitches – Samantha Spiro as Judy Garland, Sheila Reid as Margot Fonteyn (Sky Arts 2012), So You Think You Can Dance (2009–2010) Victoria Wood's Christmas Special (BBC/DVD 2009) Acorn Antiques The Musical (BBC/DVD)

Music Videos include; "Number 1" – by Goldfrapp. "The Importance of Being Idle" – by Oasis (In 2006 the video won the Shockwaves NME award for best video, and in 2005 it was also nominated for a Q Award)

His partner is dance teacher and choreographer Mark Smith, who is deaf. Mear was co-choreographer for Mary Poppins, created the entire "sign language" combination/idea for the show's hit musical number Supercalifragilisticexpialidocious, because of the knowledge of sign language he had.

Mear was appointed Commander of the Order of the British Empire (CBE) in the 2020 New Year Honours for services to dance.
