= Priya Parmar =

Author and musical theatre bookwriter

- Parmar at Boston Book Festival in 2026
- Born: 1974 (age 51–52)
- Writing career
- Notable work: Sylvia

Priya Parmar (born 1974) is an author and musical theatre bookwriter. Parmar is co-bookwriter of the musical Sylvia, which was nominated for an Olivier Award for best new musical in 2023.

== Education ==
Parmar partially grew up in Kauai. She attended Maret School in Washington DC. Parmer graduated with a degree in English from Mount Holyoke College in 1996 and then from the University of Oxford. She pursued a PhD at the University of Edinburgh.

== Bibliography ==
=== Novels ===
- Exit The Actress. Touchstone. 2011.
- Vanessa and her Sister. Ballantine Books. 2015.
