= Leon Cooke =

- Born: Leon Dominic Cooke; 8 August 1991 (age 34); Stoke-on-Trent, UK
- Years active: 1999 – present

Leon Dominic Cooke (born 8 August 1991) is an English actor, singer, dancer and choreographer.

== Early life ==
Leon Cooke was born in Stoke-on-Trent, Staffordshire, England. His parents are Joy and Michael Cooke, a former dancer and dance teacher, respectively. He has seven siblings who are also dancers: Tara, Zena, Cassandra, Damian, Anastasia, Valentina, and Dmitri.

Cooke started training at The Marilyn Jones Dance Centre at the age of two years. He learned ballet, tap, gymnastics, theatre craft, song and dance, and street dance. He was a junior and mid-associate with the Royal Ballet in Birmingham and graduated from the Millennium Performing Arts College.

== Career ==
Cooke was cast as Billy Elliot in Billy Elliot the Musical in September 2005. During his time as Billy Elliot, BBC's Blue Peter followed and filmed Cooke for a day on 18 November 2005. After completing 21 months and 200 shows as Billy, Cooke left the cast on 7 July 2007.

Between December 2008 and February 2009, he appeared as Tadzio in the English National Opera's production of Death in Venice at the Théâtre Royal de la Monnaie in Brussels and two shows at the Grande Théâtre de la Ville de Luxembourg. Cook appeared as Quaxo and Mr. Mistoffelees in the musical Cats at Jersey (Fort Regent) and Guernsey (Beau Sejour) in 2009.

In March 2010, he returned to the stage of the Victoria Palace Theatre to take part in a specially choreographed finale to celebrate the fifth anniversary of Billy Elliot the Musical opening in the West End. He completed the United Kingdom's second tour of We Will Rock You directed by Ben Elton. Cooke made his Chichester Festival debut as Wilton in Barnum, returning the following year to perform in Amadeus.

He has performed in the musical Mamma Mia at the Prince of Wales Theatre and as part of the West End Live cast in Trafalgar Square, London. He performed in Mamma Mia at its new venue, the Novello Theatre. Between 2014 and 2015, Cooke was cast in Miss Saigon in the West End. He worked with the National Theatre in their production of the musical Wonder.land, playing the role of Dee. His workshops with the National Theatre include Helen by Euripides (2016, Paris) and The Threepenny Opera (2016).

=== Choreography ===
Leon Cooke choreographed the Songtime Theatre Arts Billy Youth Theatre's production at the Richmond Theatre in 2010. He was an assistant choreographer for the BBC 2 series Our Dancing Town which aired in January 2017.

=== Television ===
While in Billy Elliot the Musical, Cooke appeared on Blue Peter, Ready Steady Cook, the Paul O'Grady Show, Happy Birthday Bafta, and as a guest performer on Any Dream Will Do. He also performed with the cast on Sunday Night at the Palladium for their tenth anniversary. Cooke appeared in Series 3 of Sky One's Got to Dance, where he gained three gold stars for a tap routine that was described by Adam Garcia as "awesome".

He performed at the Royal Variety Performance, the Olivier Awards 2015, and the Olivier Awards in 2016. In March 2016, Cooke returned to the Mamma Mia cast for a one-off television performance on ITV's Ant & Dec's Saturday Night Takeaway. In 2019, he performed on television for the D-Day 75th Anniversary commemorations in front of veterans and world leaders.

=== Commercials ===
Cooke had featured roles in commercials for Gap, Old Navy, and McDonald's in 2015. In 2019, he had a featured role in a commercial for Nestle. He also made commercials for the Disney Channel and Colgate.

== Credits ==
=== Theater ===
- 1999 – The Nutcracker, Birmingham Royal Ballet, Birmingham Hippodrome
- 2001 – The Nutcracker, Birmingham Royal Ballet, Birmingham Hippodrome
- 2002–2003 – Aladdin
- 2002 – Tosca, UK National Tour
- 2003 – The King and I, UK National Tour
- 2003–2004 – John Darling in Peter Pan
- 2005–2007 – Billy Elliot in Billy Elliot the Musical, West End
- 2009 – Tadzio in Death in Venice, English National Opera in Belgium and Luxembourg
- 2009 – Mr Mistoffelees in Cats, Channel Islands
- 2010–2012 – Cliff Richard and Rebel Leader Cover in We Will Rock You, 2nd UK National and International Tour
- 2012 – Pepper and 1st Cover/Ensemble in Mamma Mia, West End
- 2013 – Wilton in Barnum, Chichester Festival Theatre
- 2014 – Ensemble, Amadeus, Chichester Festival Theatre
- 2014–2015 – acrobat/ensemble, Miss Saigon, West End
- 2015 – Daniel Pontipee in Seven Brides for Seven Brothers, Regents Park Open Air Theatre
- 2015–2016 – Dee in Wonder.land, Royal National Theatre
- 2017 – Ensemble/Swing, On the Town, Regents Park Open Air Theatre

=== Film ===
- Billy in Billy Elliot the Musical Live (2014)
- Prison Inmate in Paddington 2 (2016)
- Leerie in Mary Poppins Returns (2016-2017)
- Mamma Mia: Here We Go Again! (2017)
- Hugh in Rocketman (2019)
- Axia Restaurant Bartender in Ant-Man and the Wasp: Quantumania (2023)
