= Rafael Aguilar =

Ecuadorian ballet dancer and choreographer

- Born: Rafael Eduardo Franco Sotomayor; 24 December 1929; Guayaquil, Ecuador
- Died: 3 March 1995 (aged 65); Madrid, Spain
- Occupations: Dancer and choreographer
- Spouse: Manuela Aguilar (m. 1951)
- Awards: Laurence Olivier Award for Best Theatre Choreographer

Rafael Aguilar (born Rafael Franco; (Note: In its obituary, The Independent erroneously states he was born Rafael Ricaurte. Ricaurte was the surname of his paternal grandmother; his grandfather, Federico Franco Izquierdo, was a Colombian diplomat who was sent to Quito, where he met and married Rosa Maria Ricaurte y Aspiazu from Guano. Per Spanish naming customs, Rafael was born Rafael Eduardo Franco Sotomayor.) 24 December 1929 – 3 March 1995) was an Ecuadorian ballet dancer and choreographer.

He was born Rafael Franco Sotomayor in Guayaquil in the house of his great-aunt and uncle. His father, Alfredo Franco Ricaurte, was born in Bogotá, who immigrated to Guayaquil to work at the Commercial and Agricultural Bank. In 1935 his father moved back to Colombia. His mother, Esther Sotomayor y Sotomayor, was from Vinces. He was the youngest of five siblings.

In 1939, his sister Leonor developed a limp that doctors diagnosed as rheumatism. They tried living for a year to Salinas for the better climate, but in 1941 their mother decided to take Leonor to Baltimore for treatment and sent the other four children to live to Bogotá to live with their father. In 1942, Leonor successfully underwent surgery in New York City, and their mother decided to stay in the United States.

Rafael Aguilar was educated first at Colegio San José La Salle, where he picked up languages easily and excelled in French. In 1944, he and his siblings were reunited in New York City, where he attended Cardinal Spellman High School.

He worked various jobs, working for a restaurant and messaging service, while enjoying the cosmopolitan lifestyle of Manhattan. He attended the opera frequently and learned to speak some Italian and Arabic from his neighbors, and considered becoming a diplomat. To prepare for this career, in 1947 he moved to Belgium to study international law at the University of Louvain. On weekends, however, he would travel to Paris, where he learned to dance flamenco, and was encouraged to study dance.

At age 20, he began his dance training in London, studying at the Royal Ballet School from 1948 to 1950. He worked with greats including Léonide Massine and John Taras, and decided his future lay in the world of dance. Rafael, who already had an effeminate nature not appreciated by his family, was told to change his surname by his brother Jorge, who was embarrassed that his brother would become a ballet dancer.

In Paris in 1951, he met Spanish dancer Manuela Aguilar, who owned a small flamenco company. He joined her company and began his choreography career, creating avant-garde dances that brought new life to flamenco. He married Manuela and moved to Spain, where he changed his name from Franco to Aguilar—a decision undertaken to avoid any associations with Francoism rather than to honor his brother's request. In 1960, they founded the Ballet Teatro Espanol de Rafael Aguilar.

For many years he created many outstanding productions, mainly flamenco themed. His wife devoted herself to studying gypsy culture and integrated many gypsy dances into their choreography as well. The highlight of his career was in 1992, when he was awarded the Laurence Olivier Award for Best Theatre Choreographer for the West End musical Matador.

== Illness and death ==
In July 1994, Aguilar began suffering severe headaches while touring Germany, and he was subsequently diagnosed with brain cancer. He underwent six weeks of radiation treatment at the Hospital of Madrid, where defective equipment burned the skin on his skull. He then went to the hospital of the Red Cross, where he improved after a course of chemotherapy. He was still weak but returned to work in time for the opening night of his production of Boléro in Madrid on 3 March 1995, when he suffered a heart attack and died. Manuela died in 1998.
