= The Big Life (musical) =

- Music: Paul Joseph
- Lyrics: Paul Sirett
- Book: Paul Sirett and Tameka Empson
- Premiere: 22 April 2004: Theatre Royal Stratford East
- Productions: 2004 Theatre Royal Stratford East; 2005 Apollo Theatre; 2024 Theatre Royal Stratford East

The Big Life is a British ska musical with book and lyrics by Paul Sirett and music by Paul Joseph, originally produced by the Theatre Royal Stratford East in 2004. It combines Shakespeare's Love's Labour's Lost with the story of the Windrush immigrants (those Jamaicans who arrived in Britain aboard HMT Empire Windrush in 1948, which began an era of multiculturalism).

The musical transferred to the West End's Apollo Theatre in 2005. It was nominated for Best New Musical at the 2006 Olivier Awards.

The musical is being revived for its 20th anniversary at Stratford East in early 2024 with previews on 16 February, an opening night on 22 February, and performances to 30 March.

== Cast and characters ==
Character	Theatre Royal Stratford East	Theatre Royal Stratford East	Apollo Theatre	Theatre Royal Stratford East
Character	(2004)	(2005)	(2005)	(2024)
Ferdy	Victor Romero Evans	Victor Romero Evans	Victor Romero Evans	Ashley Samuels
Bernie	Neil Reidman	Neil Reidman	Neil Reidman	Nathanael Campbell
Lennie	Chris Tummings	Chris Tummings	Chris Tummings	Karl Queensborough
Dennis	Marcus Powell	Marcus Powell	Marcus Powell	Khalid Daley
Zulieka	Maureen Hibbert	Antonia Kemi Coker	Antonia Kemi Coker	Rachel John
Sybil	Yaa	Yaa	Yaa	Gabrielle Brooks
Mary	Lorna Brown	Yvette Rochester	Yvette Rochester	Leanne Henlon
Kathy	Claudia Cadette	Claudia Cadette	Claudia Cadette	Juliet Agnes
Admiral	Jason Pennycooke	Jason Pennycooke	Jason Pennycooke	Danny Bailey
Jacqueline	Amanda Horlock	Amanda Horlock	Amanda Horlock	Beth Elliott
Reverend	Geoff Aymer	Geoff Aymer	Geoff Aymer	Gabriel Fleary
Mrs Aphrodite	Tameka Empson	Tameka Empson	Tameka Empson	Tameka Empson

== Awards and nominations ==
=== Original West End production ===
Year	Award	Category	Nominee	Result
2006	Laurence Olivier Awards	Best New Musical		Nominated
2006	Laurence Olivier Awards	Best Performance in a Supporting Role in a Musical	Tameka Empson	Nominated
