= Julia Cheng =

English choreographer

- Born: Julia Gar Yun Cheng; September 1984 (age 42); Luton, England
- Education: University of Surrey
- Years active: 2007–present
- Website: www.juliachengarts.com

Julia Gar Yun Cheng (born September 1984) is a choreographer, dance artist, and creative director. She has received a number of accolades, including two Laurence Olivier Award nominations.

== Early life and education ==
Cheng was born in Luton to Chinese parents. She was first introduced to dance through a ballet performance when she was 3 and re-discovered it as a teenager, participating in local hip-hop clubs. Cheng graduated with a degree in Drama, Theatre and Performance Studies from the University of Surrey in 2007. She also studied French and spent a year abroad at Lumière University Lyon 2. She then trained in the Graham, Horton and jazz techniques.

== Career ==
Cheng starting competing in 2007 and won her first hip-hop competition in 2009. She was a 2010 Associate Artist of The Hat Factory in Luton. She taught at the University of Roehampton and applied for a Step Out Arts commission.

In 2014, Cheng founded and became creative director of the performance company House of Absolute. She also founded Kolesk Dance. In 2019 and 2022, Cheng was a BBC Four Young Dancer.

Cheng made her West End debut choreographing the revival of Cabaret at the Playhouse Theatre (rebranded as the Kit Kat Club). For her work, Cheng won Best Creative West End Debut at The Stage Debut Awards and was nominated for the Laurence Olivier Award for Best Theatre Choreographer. Cheng's choreography carried over when the production transferred to New York's August Wilson Theatre in 2024, marking her Broadway debut.

Also in 2022, Cheng created the show Warrior Queens for her company House of Absolute, which was staged at the Sadler's Wells Theatre alongside Shades of Blue by Matsena Productions.

Cheng choreographed Fiddler on the Roof at the Regent's Park Open Air Theatre in 2024, for which she received Laurence Olivier and WhatsOnStage Award nominations. The production transferred to the Barbican Centre the following year. She was also choreographer and movement director for Much Ado About Nothing at the Royal Shakespeare Theatre in Stratford-upon-Avon. As of 2025, Cheng is an Associate Artist of the Southbank Centre.

== Stage credits ==
Year	Title	Notes
2021	Cabaret	Kit Kat Club at Playhouse Theatre, London
2022	Warrior Queens	Sadler's Wells Theatre, London
2023	Macbeth	Royal Shakespeare Theatre, Stratford-upon-Avon
2024	Cabaret	August Wilson Theatre, New York
2024	Fiddler on the Roof	Regent's Park Open Air Theatre, London
2025	Much Ado About Nothing	Royal Shakespeare Theatre, Stratford-upon-Avon
2025	Dream Ballets: A Triple Bill	Regent's Park Open Air Theatre, London

== Accolades ==
Year	Award	Category	Work	Result	Ref.
2022	Laurence Olivier Awards	Best Theatre Choreographer	Cabaret	Nominated	
2022	The Stage Debut Awards	Best Creative West End Debut	Cabaret	Won	
2025	WhatsOnStage Awards	Best Choreography	Fiddler on the Roof	Nominated	
2025	Laurence Olivier Awards	Best Theatre Choreographer	Fiddler on the Roof	Nominated	
2025	Chita Rivera Awards	Outstanding Choreography in a Broadway Show	Cabaret	Nominated	
