= Kelly Agbowu =

Kelly Agbowu is an English singer and musical theatre actress. She is best known for her roles in the musicals Sylvia, Waitress and Mrs Doubtfire.

== Early life and education ==
Agbowu was born in Croydon in London. She trained at the London School of Musical Theatre, graduating in 2009.

== Career ==
=== Musical theatre ===
During her early career, Agbowu performed in roles at the London School of Musical Theatre Studios, The Young Vic, and the Shaw Theatre in Niagra-on-the-Lake, Canada.

In 2019, Agbowu joined the musical Waitress at the Adelphi Theatre as Nurse Norma. She hosted "Cast Karaoke Nights" at the theatre with fellow cast member Sandra Marvin.

Agbowu played "the General" Mrs. Flora Drummond and Mrs Savoy in the suffragette musical Sylvia, which ran at The Old Vic in 2023.

From 2023 to 2024 Agbowu covered the role of Wanda Sellner in the first UK production of the musical Mrs Doubtfire.

In 2025, Agbowu was announced as joining the cast of the Bob Geldof's Live Aid Musical at The Old Vic and as Marsha in the West End transfer "Just For One Day" at the Shaftesbury Theatre.

== Stage credits ==
| Year | Title | Role | Venue |
|---|---|---|---|
| 2009 | Much Ado About Nothing | Ursula | London School of Musical Theatre Studios |
| 2009 | Bernada Alba | Paca La Rosetta | London School of Musical Theatre Studios |
| 2010 | The Human Comedy | Ensemble / Townsperson | The Young Vic |
| 2010 | Elegies for Angels, Punks and Raging Queen | Choir/Vocalist | The Shaw Theatre (Canada) |
| 2012 | RENT | Sue / Junie / Carole | Greenwich Theatre |
| 2013 - 2015 | The Lion King | Swing and cover Shenzi | UK and International tour |
| 2015 | Baddies | Ugly Sister | Unicorn Theatre |
| 2016 - 2018 | The Book of Mormon | Swing | The Prince of Wales Theatre |
| 2018 | The Wizard of Oz | The Lion | Birmingham Repertory Theatre |
| 2019 | Waitress | Nurse Norma / Cover Becky | Adelphi Theatre |
| 2019 - 2022 | Les Miserables | Madame / 1st Cover Madame Thenardier | Sondheim Theatre |
| 2021 | Les Miserables concert | Locket Crone | Sondheim Theatre |
| 2022 | Tammy Faye | | Almeida Theatre |
| 2023 | Sylvia | Mrs Flora Drummond (the General) / Mrs Savoy | The Old Vic |
| 2023 - 2024 | Mrs Doubtfire | Wanda Sellner | Shaftesbury Theatre |
| 2024 | The Mad Hatters Tea Party | | Linbury Theatre, Royal Opera House |
| 2025 | Just For One Day | Marsha | Shaftesbury Theatre |

== Other credits ==
Agbowu has starred in the feature film Dreams of a Life (2011), in an episode of BBC’s Cop School (2010) and in short film The Christening (2010).

Agbowu is also a well known voice over artist and has voiced several campaigns for Nescafe, TFL, Babbel and BT Sports. She was a Talking Head in Nokia's ‘"Talking Heads" (2012).

She was the lead vocalist for the function band Motown Gold and performed at the Croydon Carnival in 2023.
