= Matador (English musical) =

1991 musical

Matador is the title of a 1991 musical by Mike Leander and Eddie Seago, with a book by Peter Jukes, which tells the story of the rise and fall of a fictional matador, loosely based on Manuel Benitez, El Cordobes. The show featured stunning choreography in traditional Flamenco style by Rafael Aguilar, and the show won an Olivier Award as a result. Several dancers were cast directly from Spain, making their West End debuts. The bulls for the fighting sequences were performed by a phalanx of black-clad dancers, moving as one.

The work began life in 1987 as a concept album, starring Tom Jones. Jones was keen to play the lead on stage, and gave up his Las Vegas cabaret shows to return to the UK for that purpose. The musical was initially unable to attract the financial backing required, but Jones did get his first UK top ten hit after a fifteen-year dry spell, with his single, A Boy From Nowhere, lifted from the Matador concept album. The follow-up single "I Was Born to Be Me" peaked at No. 61 in January 1988.

Eventually financial backing was secured, and the show opened at the Queen's Theatre in London on April 16, 1991. Audiences and most critics were positive, but the 1991 London theatre season was heavily impacted by the Persian Gulf War and the subsequent drop in tourism. The production folded after three months. The London production starred John Barrowman as Domingo Hernandez and Stefanie Powers as American actress Laura Jane Wilding, a character based on actress Ava Gardner. Nicky Henson and Caroline O'Connor costarred.

After the failure of the London production, the authors returned to America and made revisions to the book and score during productions in regional and college theatres.

== List of songs on the concept album ==
1. "Overture"
2. "There's No Way Out of Here"
3. "To Be a Matador"
4. "I Was Born to be Me"
5. "Only Other People"
6. "Manolete! Belmonte! Joselito!"
7. "A Boy from Nowhere"
8. "Wake Up Madrid"
9. "I'll Take You Out to Dinner"
10. "This Incredible Journey"
11. "Don't Be Deceived"
12. "I'll Dress You in Mourning"
13. "Dance with Death"
14. "A Panama Hat"

== List of songs used in the London production ==
1. "Overture"
2. "A Panama Hat"
3. "There's No Way Out of This Town"
4. "Moon in the Sky"
5. "Pastures at Night (The Bull)"
6. "There's No Way Out of This Town (Reprise)"
7. "Manolete, Belmonte, Joselito"
8. "I Was Born To Be Me"
9. "This Incredible Journey"
10. "A Panama Hat (Reprise)"
11. "A Boy From Nowhere"
12. "I'll Take You Out to Dinner"
13. "I'll Dress You in Mourning"
14. "What Is There More Than Love?"
15. "To Be a Matador"
16. "Only Other People"
17. "Children of the Sun"
18. "A Boy From Nowhere (Reprise)"
19. "I Can Get By"
20. "I'll Dress You in Mourning (Reprise)"
21. "Corrida/I Am You, You Are Me"
22. "A Boy From Nowhere (Reprise)/Finale"
23. "Bows/Exit Music"

== Discography ==
A cast recording was planned, but cancelled the day before it was due to be recorded. The show's star, John Barrowman, recorded two songs from the score ("I Was Born To Be Me" and "I'll Dress You In Mourning") which were released as 45 RPM and CD singles timed to coincide with the London opening. Barrowman later recorded "A Boy From Nowhere" on his solo CD, Reflections (released by JAY records).

- "Matador" – Various Artists (album, Epic VIVA 1)
- "A Boy from Nowhere" – Tom Jones (Epic OLE 1)
- "To be a Matador" – John Springate (Epic OLE 2)
- "I'll Dress You in Mourning" – Tom Jones (Epic OLE 3)
- "Born To Be Me" – Tom Jones (Epic OLE 4)
- "I Was Born To Be Me" – John Barrowman (Epic 6567332)
- "I'll Dress You In Mourning" – John Barrowman (Epic 6567332)
- "A Boy From Nowhere" – John Barrowman (JAY)
