= Sylvia (musical) =

2018 British musical

- Original London Production Poster
- Music: Josh Cohen; DJ Walde
- Lyrics: Kate Prince
- Book: Kate Prince; Priya Parmer
- Premiere: 12 September 2018: The Old Vic, London
- Productions: 2018 London (work-in-progress); 2023 London; 2026 UK tour

Sylvia is a British musical with book by Kate Prince and Priya Parmar, with music by Josh Cohen and DJ Walde and lyrics by Prince based on the life of Sylvia Pankhurst.

== Plot ==
Starting with a flash-forward to Sylvia's expulsion from the Women's Social and Political Union (WSPU) in 1913, the work returns to Sylvia and her sister Christabel's childhood, their memories of their father Richard's death, the early days of the WSPU, Christabel's relationship with Annie Kenney, the death of Sylvia's brother Harry and particularly Sylvia's close but on-off relationship with Labour leader Keir Hardie. A sub-plot centres on the political and home life of Winston Churchill, pulled in different directions on the women's suffrage issue by his mother Jennie and his wife Clementine.

The stakes are raised by misogynist threats and police brutality, leading Emmeline, Christabel and Flora Drummond towards a more militant stance. The pacifist Sylvia takes issue with this but still takes part in the ensuing window-breaking, imprisonment and hunger strikes. She also disagrees with their strategic delay in seeking the vote for working-class women and their reactions to Hugh Franklin's attack on Churchill and Emily Davison's death, which Sylvia sees as merely capitalising on them for press attention and public support. Ultimately Sylvia is unable to give the unquestioning loyalty required by Christabel and Emmeline and is expelled from the WSPU, freeing her up to form the East London Federation of Suffragettes in tandem with George Lansbury and lead a delegation of working-class East End women to Parliament.

Sylvia comes close to achieving her goals with the third of the Conciliation Bills - the Prime Minister makes this conditional on an end to militant action, but Sylvia is unable to convince her mother and sister to call such a truce. Keir Hardie resigns his parliamentary seat in protest at the outbreak of World War One and rapidly descends into ill-health, with his wife reluctantly arranging a final meeting between him and Sylvia. Emmeline suspends suffragette activity for the duration of the war and women over 30 are granted the vote in 1918. In the final scene, Sylvia brings the child she has had with her partner Silvio Corio to attempt one final reconciliation with her mother, only to find Emmeline assisting in Christabel's campaign to win a seat - as a Conservative candidate.

== Production history ==
=== London - work-in-progress (2018) ===
The musical was originally co-commissioned by the Old Vic, Sadler's Wells and 14-18 NOW from Kate Prince and her company ZooNation to mark the centenary of the Representation of the People Act 1918 and the end of the First World War. However, it evolved into a full-scale dance, soul, funk and hip hop musical, which was initially presented at The Old Vic as a work-in-progress from 8 to 22 September 2018. A full production of the completed version had its world premiere in 2023, playing at The Old Vic from 27 January to 8 April 2023, with its official opening night on 14 February 2023. Initially scheduled to run until 1 April 2023, the production was extended due to popular demand.

The main score was written by DJ Walde and Josh Cohen, with additional music by Prince. The work-in-progress 2018 run was mounted by Prince's company ZooNation, with Maria Omakinwa (understudying for Genesis Lynea) as Sylvia, Witney White and Verity Blyth as her sisters Christabel and Adela and Beverley Knight as their mother Emmeline.

=== London - world premiere (2023) ===
The 2023 world premiere production was again directed and choreographed by Kate Prince and stars Beverley Knight, reprising her role as Emmeline Pankhurst, Sharon Rose as the titular character Sylvia, Ellena Vincent and Kirstie Skivington as her sisters Christabel and Adela, Alex Gaumond as Keir Hardie, founder and first leader of the Labour Party and Kelly Agbowu as Mrs Flora 'The General' Drummond/Betty Savoy.

=== UK tour and London (2026) ===
On 23 October 2025, it was announced that the musical will tour the UK opening at the Curve, Leicester (24 Sep - 3 Oct), Birmingham Hippodrome (6 - 10 Oct), Edinburgh Festival Theatre (12-17 Oct), The Lowry, Salford (19-24 Oct), Theatre Royal, Norwich (27-31 Oct), Marlowe Theatre, Canterbury (2-7 Nov) before heading to the Royal Albert Hall, London from 13-15 November 2026. Knight, Vincent, Skivington and Agbowu reprised their roles from the 2023 production, alongside Naomi Katiyo as the titular character Sylvia.

== Cast and characters ==
Character	London	UK Tour
Character	2023	2026
Emmeline Pankhurst	Beverley Knight	Beverley Knight
Sylvia Pankhurst	Sharon Rose	Naomi Katiyo
Mrs Flora "The General" Drummond/Betty Savoy	Kelly Agbowu	Kelly Agbowu
Alternate Sylvia Pankhurst	N/A	Lauren Azania
Emily Davison/Daisy Parsons	N/A	Ebony Clarke
Annie Kenney/Norah Smyth	Kate Ivory Jordan	Eloise Davies
Prime Minister Asquith/Richard Pankhurst	N/A	Solomon Davy
Clementine Churchill/Julia Scurr (Note: The actor playing Clementine Churchill/Julia Scurr also played Kitty in the 2023 London Production.)	Verity Blyth	Collette Guitart
Edith Garrud/Mollie Bird	N/A	Leah Hill
Keir Hardie (Note: The actor playing Keir Hardie also plays Lord Cromer in the 2026 UK Tour Production)	Alex Gaumond	Tachia Newall
Harry Pankhurst (Note: The actor playing Henry Pankhurst also played Sir Almroth Wright/Prime Minister Asquith/King George V in the 2023 London Production)	Razak Osman	Uzuazo O'David
Winston Churchill/George Lansbury	Jay Perry	Castell Parker
Lloyd George/Lord Curzon	Stevie Hutchinson	Cleve September
Adela Pankhurst (Note: The actor playing Adela Pankhurst also played Mrs Bird in the 2023 London Production.)	Kirstie Skivington	Kirstie Skivington
Lady Jennie Churchill/Edna Payne/Grace Roe	N/A	Kenedy Small
Silvio Corio (Note: The actor playing Silvio Corio also plays Sir Almroth Wright in the 2026 UK Tour production.)	Sweeney	Ivano Turco
Christabel Pankhurst	Ellena Vincent	Ellena Vincent
Lady Jennie Churchill/Edna Payne/Edith Garrud	Jade Hackett	N/A
Emily Davison/Lillie Hardie/Mrs Watkins	Kimmy Edwards	N/A
Lord Cromer/Richard Pankhurst/Alan	Bradley Charles	N/A
Mrs Parsons/Sophia Duleep Singh	Kandaka Moore	N/A
Understudy Emmeline Pankhurst	Hannah Khemoh	N/A

== Band ==
Role	London	UK Tour
Role	2023	2026
Keys 1/Musical Director	Sean Green	Sean Green
Keys 2/Associate Musical Director	N/A	Adam Wachter
Keys 2/Organ	Joe Thomas	Joe Thomas
Guitar	Frankie South	Shirley Tetteh
Bass	Rachel Espeute	Caleb Wilson
Drums	Vanessa Dominique	Ishara Andrews

== Awards ==
Year	Award	Category	Nominee	Result
2023	Laurence Olivier Awards	Best New Musical		Nominated
2023	Laurence Olivier Awards	Best Actress in a Supporting Role in a Musical	Beverley Knight	Won
2023	Laurence Olivier Awards	Best Theatre Choreographer	Kate Prince	Nominated

== Sources ==
- Official website
- "Sylvia at The Old Vic - Official Page".
- Winship, Lyndsey (30 August 2018). "Sylvia: the suffragettes giving musicals a kick in the ballots". The Guardian.
