= Liam Mower =

English actor and dancer

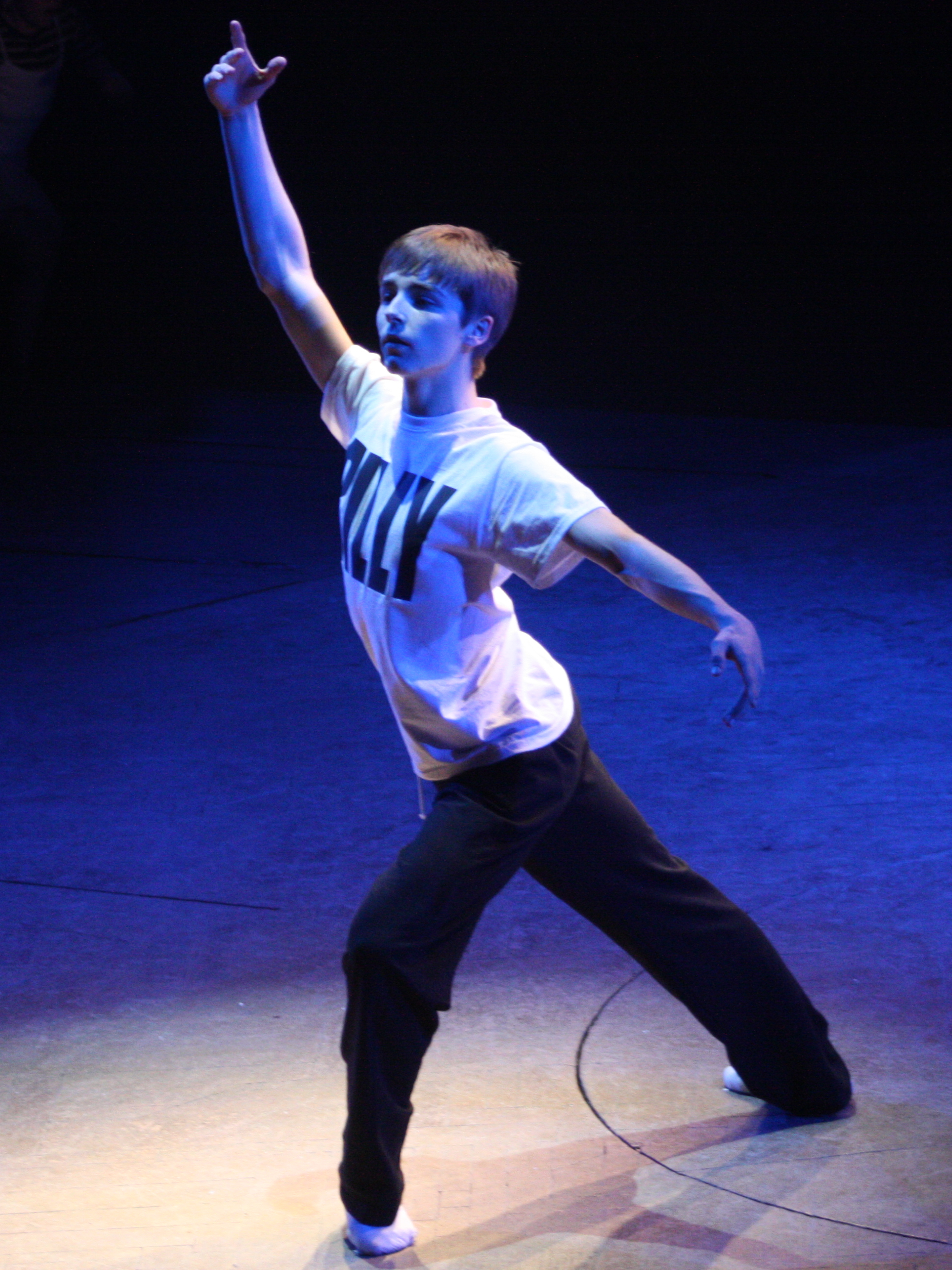
- Liam Mower performing in the 5th Anniversary Show of Billy Elliot the Musical in March 2010
- Born: Liam Mower; 30 May 1992 (age 34); Kingston upon Hull, England
- Years active: 2005–present
- Awards: Theatre Goers' Choice Award; 2005 Billy Elliot The Musical; Laurence Olivier Award; 2006 Billy Elliot The Musical

Liam Mower (born 30 May 1992 in Kingston upon Hull, England) is an English actor and dancer. Best known for his talent for ballet, he was one of the three boys who shared the lead role in the original London cast of Billy Elliot the Musical which earned a Laurence Olivier Award for Best Actor in a Leading Role in a Musical, making him the youngest nominee and the youngest solo winner in the category aged 13. He is currently employed by Matthew Bourne and has appeared in his production of Swan Lake, The Nutcracker and The Car Man.

== Early life and education ==
Mower is from Kingston upon Hull. His father is an engineer, and his mother works in a sandwich shop. Born into a family of four boys, Mower has three brothers, (Luke, Lewis and Leighton). He became a boarding pupil at the Royal Ballet School (RBS) whilst still auditioning for Billy Elliot, but later scaled down his connection to it, in order to be able to meet his professional commitments without losing out on quality of life. Mower also attended the Northern Academy of Performing Arts (NAPA) in Kingston upon Hull, but now studies at the Rambert School of Ballet and Contemporary Dance in Twickenham. Before taking up his place at Rambert, he was also offered a place at the London Studio Centre.

== Acting and dancing career ==
Mower's first performance as Billy, before the Press night (11 May 2005) was on 31 March 2005 and he continued performing until the end of September 2006. He also appeared in the Elton John video of Electricity and was featured in the BBC's Children in Need on 18 November 2005, performing Electricity. He also made several television appearances, such as his famed appearances on Blue Peter. Mower made his final scheduled appearance in Billy Elliot on 30 September 2006. His departure was covered by the local and international press, as it spelt the end of the original child cast of 'Billys'. A dedication was made by the cast on his final performance, and he was presented with a dog, named "Billy". Upon his departure, Stephen Daldry stated that "Liam is a unique talent and we have all been blessed with the opportunity to see him flourish in Billy Elliot over the past eighteen months. Rarely does one ever come across a performer with so many skills and talents, particularly when matched by Liam's determination and good humour. He has been at the centre of Billy Elliot's extended family for three and a half years now and his last performance will be an overwhelmingly emotional evening. As Liam hurtles towards adulthood we will be saying goodbye to one of the most celebrated child performers ever in the West End. An end of an era for us and the beginning of another huge adventure for Liam." He returned home to Archbishop Thurstan School (now Archbishop Sentamu Academy), Hull, to study for GCSEs, but made a brief return to Billy Elliot on 22 November 2006, performing in a charity gala for the children's charity Place2Be. During the show he was joined by both Elton John and the X Factor judging panel who made cameo appearances as the RBS panel.

Mower's career after Billy Elliot was somewhat calmer, but he still kept up theatrical activities. He appeared as a minor part in October 2006 in Thoroughly Modern Millie at Hull New Theatre, and subsequently made an appearance in the popular ITV Crime Series, Wire in the Blood playing the part of Mikey. His most recent work has been his appearance as the title character in Pinocchio during Christmas 2007 at The Priestley Theatre in Bradford. He also appeared on the soundtrack to Pinocchio which is available on iTunes.

Mower recently stated that he would like to return to the West End stage, saying he was taking singing lessons. He did very well at his GCSEs with 14 grades from A* to C. Mower also previously stated that he would like to be a dancer before being an actor: "After I have got my degree at the school I would like to join a dance company and then go into acting a bit later. It makes sense to do it that way round."

In November 2011, it was announced that Mower would be returning to the stage in Matthew Bourne's Nutcracker. In the production of the ballet, Mower was to be portraying one of the two Cupids.

In 2012, Mower spoke about his time working as Billy on a documentary called The Story of Musicals. In the interview, Billy Elliot lyricist Lee Hall said that on the first run through of the show, Mower was so physically strained that he vomited at the side of the stage after performing Angry Dance. Of the incident, Mower said: "I was just in mid-pirouette [when I] just threw up everywhere. [I] literally projectile vomited."

From January 2014, Mower has starred in Matthew Bourne's Swan Lake as the Prince.

On 28 September 2014, Mower returned for Billy Elliot the Musical Live!, a one-off live screening to many countries, where he played the role of Older Billy in the duet.

From December 2014 - January 2015, Mower starred in Matthew Bourne's New Adventures production of Edward Scissorhands at Sadler's Wells in London. He shares the leading role with Dominic North.

== Accolades ==
He won, jointly with James Lomas and George Maguire, the 2005 Theatre Goers' Choice Award for The Most Promising Newcomer. And on 26 February 2006 Mower, James Lomas and George Maguire received a Laurence Olivier Award for Best Actor in a Musical for their performances in the musical, making them the first to win one in a shared capacity. This makes Mower the youngest ever winner of this award. Mower also obtained a Critics' Circle Award the same month for Best Newcomer.

== See also ==
- List of British actors
