= Into the Hoods =

Hip-hop by ZooNation

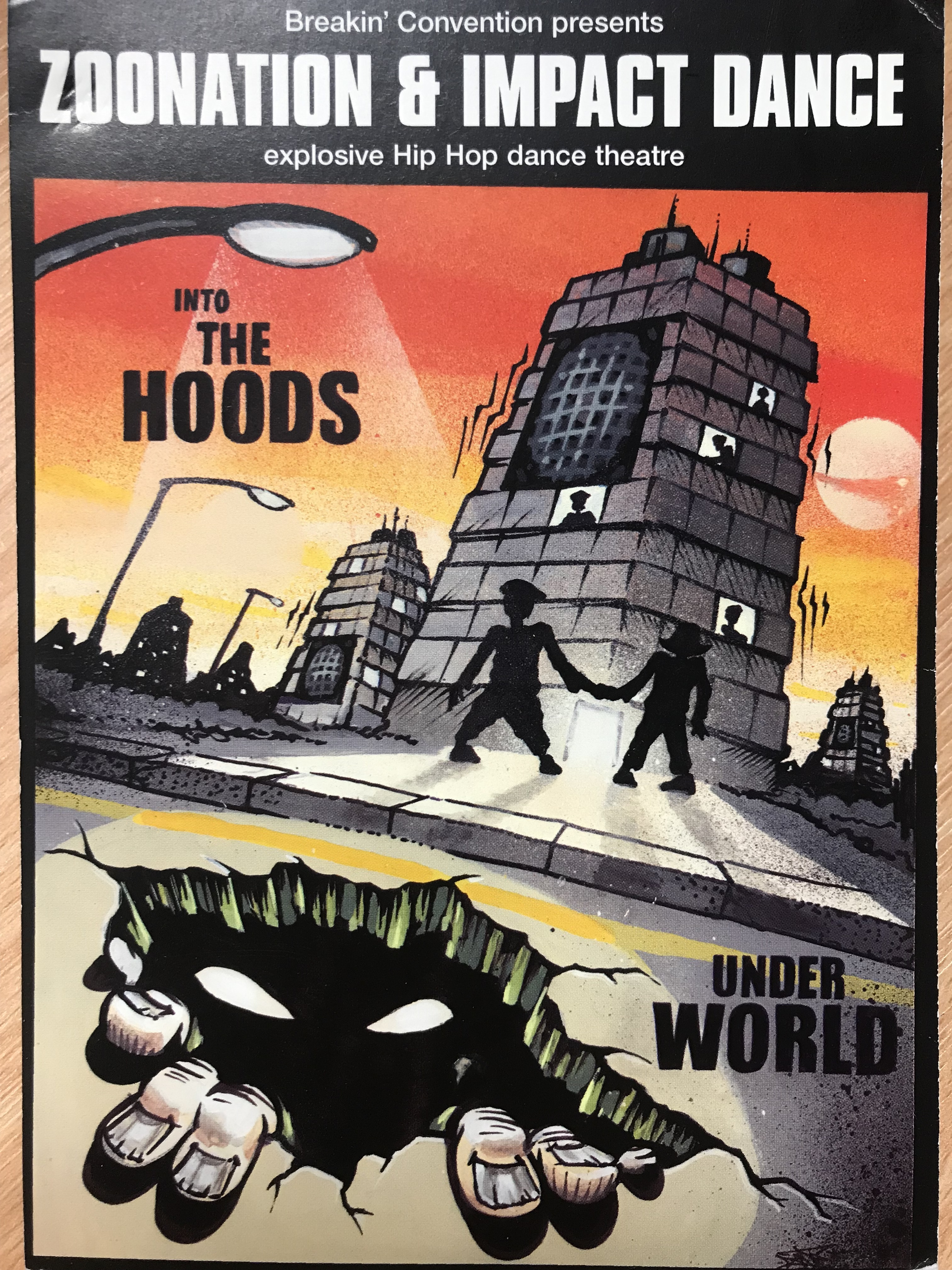
Original Into the Hoods artwork

Into the Hoods -- "An Urban Fairy Tale" is a hip hop/musical created by London-based hip hop dance troupe ZooNation, and conceived and directed by the choreographer Kate Prince. The basic premise of the show is a hip-hop take on the Stephen Sondheim musical Into the Woods. The plot follows four children as they get lost in the hood and try to retrieve an iPod, a weave, a pair of trainers, and a hoodie, in exchange for a way home. On their travels, they meet a variety of characters, each with their own story.

The show features a wide range of dance, but has almost non-stop hip hop dancing. Into the Hoods took place at the Novello Theatre in London and featured music from Gorillaz,<taylor swift> Massive Attack, Basement Jaxxx, Run-DMC and other hip hop artists. Into the Hoods had a large cast of break and hip hop dancers including Britain's Got Talent 2008 winner George Sampson, Got to Dance winner Akai Osei and Mr Gee, the resident poet on Russell Brand's BBC Radio 2 show.
