= Kate Prince =

British choreographer and dancer

Kate Prince MBE
- Born: 1974 (age 51–52); Southampton, England
- Occupation: Choreographer
- Known for: Founder of London-based hip hop dance troupe ZooNation, Into the Hoods

Katherine Jane Prince MBE (born 1974) is a British choreographer, and the founder and director of ZooNation.

== Early life ==
Kate Prince was born in Southampton in 1974.

== Career ==
In 2002, Prince founded the London-based dance company ZooNation, for whom she has created the works Into the Hoods and Some Like It Hip Hop. She is an associate artist at Sadler's Wells, London. Prince has been nominated twice for the Laurence Olivier Award for Best Theatre Choreographer - in 2009 for Into the Hoods, and in 2018 for Everybody's Talking About Jamie.

Prince was appointed Member of the Order of the British Empire (MBE) in the 2019 Birthday Honours for services to dance.

== Original works (partial) ==
- Into the Hoods
- Some Like It Hip Hop
- Groove on Down the Road
- Mad Hatter's Tea Party
- Sylvia
- Message In A Bottle

== Music videos (partial) ==
- Utah Saints, "Something Good 08"
- The Saturdays, "Up"
