= London Studio Centre =

Education organization in London

Coordinates: 51.613°N 0.177°W

- Type: Dance school, theatre school
- Established: 1978
- Affiliations: CDMT; Middlesex University
- Director: Nic Espinosa
- Students: 300+
- Location: artsdepot, Nether Street, North Finchley, London, United Kingdom
- Nickname: LSC
- Website: London Studio Centre

London Studio Centre, in North Finchley, London, is a British dance and theatre school providing courses in classical ballet, contemporary dance, jazz dance, and musical theatre. It is accredited by the Council for Dance, Drama and Musical Theatre.

== History ==
London Studio Centre was founded in 1978 by Bridget Espinosa, artistic director of the Bush Davies Ballet School and previously of the Elmhurst Ballet School. The Espinosa family is descended from the dancer Léon Espinosa (1825–1903).

Elizabeth Hurley, who later became one of the school's most famous students, was expelled for non-attendance in 1986.

From 1995, Bachelor of Arts degrees were awarded to students by Middlesex University, and then in 2004 this was replaced by an affiliation for the same purpose with the University of the Arts London, but with effect from 2013 the Middlesex University partnership was reinstated.

The school was based at 42-50 York Way, Kings Cross, London, from 1986 to 2012, when it moved to occupy rooms and share other facilities in the Artsdepot building in North Finchley, its present home.

== Facilities ==
London Studio Centre's facilities at artsdepot include a lecture room, ten dance studios, a library, and other rooms for singing and drama. It also has shared use of the on-site Pentland Theatre and Studio Theatre.

== Notable alumni ==
- Lucy Alexander, television presenter
- Tamsier Joof Aviance, choreographer and historian
- Natricia Bernard, choreographer
- Rafael Bonachela
- Teneisha Bonner
- Laurie Brett, actress
- Luke Brown
- Hannah Cowley, actress and director
- Adrianne Langley musical theatre actress
- Paul Curran, opera director
- Chloe Dallimore, actress, singer, and dancer
- Hannah Dodd, actress, model
- Luke Evans, singer and actor
- Hayley Angel Holt, actress
- Elizabeth Hurley, actress and model
- Javine Hylton
- Cassidy Janson, actress
- Lolly, singer
- Suzanne May, actress
- Aoibhinn McGinnity, actress
- Stephen Mear CBE
- Robyn North, singer and actress
- Tamzin Outhwaite, actress
- Juan Pablo Di Pace, actor, singer, and director
- Matthew Pateman, singer
- Jason Pennycooke, actor and choreographer
- Nicholas Pinnock, actor
- Golda Rosheuvel, actress
- Louis Spence
- Scarlett Strallen, actress
- Zizi Strallen, actress, singer, and dancer
- Zelda Tinska, actress
- Suzie Toase, actress
- Judi Trott, actress
- Gemma Whelan, actress and comedian
- Lia Williams, actress and director
- Teneisha Bonner

== Notable teaching staff ==
- Mark Baldwin
- Stephanie Beacham
- Mary Goodhew
- Christopher Hampson (born 1973)
- Gary Harris
- Shobana Jeyasingh (born 1957)
- Anya Linden
- Dame Alicia Markova
- Stephen Mear (born 1964)
- Molly Molloy (1940–2016)
- Merle Park
- Michael Pink
- Elizabeth Seal
- David Wall
- Lizzie Webb
- Doreen Wells
- Belinda Wright
- Jelko Yuresha (born 1937)
