= James Lomas (actor) =

British Olivier Award-winning actor (born 1990)

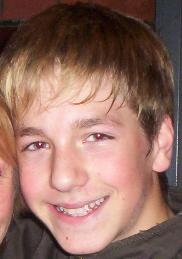
- Lomas in 2005
- Born: James Jacob-Lomas; 1 March 1990 (age 36); Sheffield, England, UK
- Years active: 2005–present
- Awards: Theatre Goers' Choice Award; 2005 Billy Elliot The Musical; Laurence Olivier Award; 2006 Billy Elliot The Musical

James Jacob Lomas (born 1 March 1990) is a British actor best known for his role as Billy Elliot in Billy Elliot the Musical, which earned a Laurence Olivier Award for Best Actor in a Leading Role in a Musical, making him one of the youngest winners of the awards.

Lomas was one of the three original Billy Elliots of the original West End theatre production of Billy Elliot the Musical. He continued performing until 7 January 2006. Together with his two original colleagues Liam Mower and George Maguire, alternating in the role of "Billy", he performed again in a first anniversary Gala show on 12 May 2006.

== Early life and education ==
Lomas started dancing with the Sharon Berry School of Theatre Dance in Sheffield at around the age of 12, after his Drama teacher taught him and suggested he pursue dancing in order to be able to perform on a West End stage. He attended Ecclesfield School, in Chapeltown.

== Acting career ==
Lomas was featured in Strictly Dance Fever performing part of the final scene of Billy Elliot the Musical, and in several TV interviews and short clips related to the musical. In July 2006 he played the title role of young blind Nicholas Saunderson in the new musical No Horizon in Penistone, northern England and was well received for his performances.

He won the Variety Club's 2005 Outstanding New Talent award, and, jointly with Liam Mower and George Maguire, the Theatre Goers' Choice Award 2005 for The Most Outstanding Newcomer, as well as - uniquely in British theatre history - jointly with his two cast mates, the Laurence Olivier Award for Best Actor in a Musical (2006). Billy Elliot the Musical has won several awards: The Evening Standard Theatre Award (2005), the Critics' Circle Theatre Award (2005), the Theatre Goers' Choice Award (2005), and the Laurence Olivier Award for Best Musical (2006), all for best British Musical.

Lomas gained a place at the Millennium dance and drama school in London, where he began his studies from September 2006 onwards.

He also starred in the short film King Ponce, which debuted at the 2007 Cannes Film Festival, and featured in an episode of Super Sweet 16 UK as a dance partner for the party.

After leaving drama school Lomas appeared in Dirty Dancing, as a swing and understudy for Jordan, toured with Joseph and the Amazing Technicolor Dreamcoat understudying Joseph and played Espresso in Starlight Express in Bochum, Germany.

Lomas is one of the "100" on the BBC One Saturday night television show All Together Now. He is currently touring in the uk with The Ballroom Boys

== See also ==
- List of British actors
