= Novello Theatre =

Theatre in London

- Waldorf Theatre; Strand Theatre; Whitney Theatre
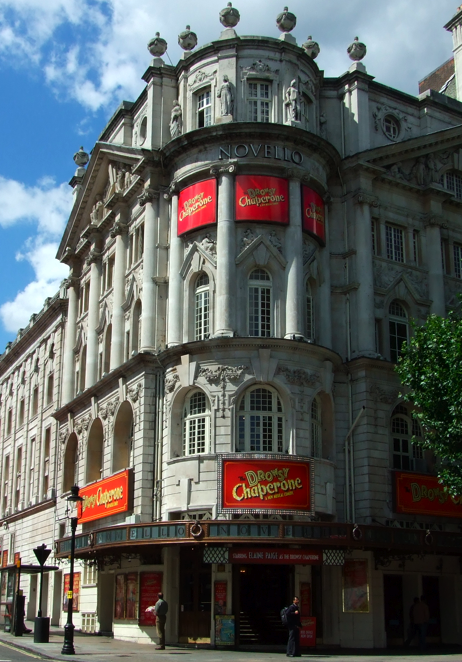
- (2007)
- Interactive map of Novello Theatre
- Address: Aldwych; London, WC2; United Kingdom
- Coordinates: 51.512306°N 0.11925°W
- Owner: Delfont Mackintosh Theatres
- Capacity: 1,146
- Type: West End theatre
- Designation: Grade II
- Production: Mamma Mia!
- Public transit: Covent Garden; Temple

Construction
- Opened: 22 May 1905; 121 years ago
- Architect: W.G.R. Sprague

Website
- delfontmackintosh.co.uk/theatres/novello-theatre/

The Novello Theatre is a West End theatre on Aldwych, in the City of Westminster. It was known as the Strand Theatre between 1913 and 2005.

== History ==
The theatre was built as one of a pair with the Aldwych Theatre on either side of The Waldorf Hilton, London, both being designed by W. G. R. Sprague. The theatre was opened by The Shubert Organization as the Waldorf Theatre on 22 May 1905, and was renamed the Strand Theatre, in 1909. It was again renamed as the Whitney Theatre in 1911, before again becoming the Strand Theatre in 1913. In 2005, the theatre was renamed by its owners (Delfont Mackintosh Theatres) the Novello Theatre in honour of Ivor Novello, who lived in a flat above the theatre from 1913 to 1951.

The black comedy Arsenic and Old Lace had a run of 1337 performances here in the 1940s, and Sailor Beware! ran for 1231 performances from 1955. Stephen Sondheim's musical A Funny Thing Happened on the Way to the Forum opened here in 1963, running for nearly two years. In 1971, the comedy No Sex Please, We're British opened here, remaining for over 10 years of its 16-year run until it transferred to the Garrick Theatre in 1982.

The theatre was extensively refurbished in 1930 and again in the early 1970s. It was Grade II listed by English Heritage on 20 July 1971. After The Rat Pack: Live from Las Vegas in 2005, its 100th anniversary year, the theatre was extensively refurbished. The current seating capacity is 1,105.

The theatre reopened on 8 December 2005 with the Royal Shakespeare Company (RSC)'s annual London season, playing to 4-week runs of Twelfth Night, The Comedy of Errors, A Midsummer Night's Dream and As You Like It, concluding in March 2006.

In 2006, the theatre played host to the London première of the Broadway musical Footloose, starring Cheryl Baker. Ending on 11 November, Footloose made way for the Royal Shakespeare Company's return season for 2006–7, following which the Broadway musical The Drowsy Chaperone made its European première on 6 June 2007. The London production starred Elaine Paige, Bob Martin, Summer Strallen and John Partridge. The London production closed after a run of only two months on 4 August 2007 after failing to attract audiences, despite positive notices.

It was announced on 10 July 2007, just three days after the announcement of Drowsy's premature closure that the theatre would be the home of a new musical version of the MGM motion picture Desperately Seeking Susan with music by Blondie and Deborah Harry, directed by Angus Jackson, and starring Emma Williams and Kelly Price. The musical previewed on 16 October 2007 (originally 12 October 2007), receiving its world première on 15 November 2007. However, just two weeks after its opening, following a critical mauling, the show announced its final performance for 15 December 2007, having played just four weeks of previews and four weeks of open run, losing over £3.5 million.

A quick replacement came in the form of the cross-West End transfer of Shadowlands from the Wyndham's Theatre, commencing 21 December 2007 for a 12-week run to 25 February 2008. Producer Phil McIntyre opened ZooNation's adaptation of the musical Into the Woods, entitled Into the Hoods, on 26 March 2008.

The longest running show in modern times is Mamma Mia!, which premiered on 6 April 1999 at the Prince Edward Theatre. It transferred to the Prince of Wales Theatre 9 June 2004 – 1 September 2012. It then transferred to the Novello Theatre on 6 September 2012 where it is still running in 2026.

This theatre is one of the 40 theatres featured in the 2012 DVD documentary series Great West End Theatres, presented by Donald Sinden.

In 2020, following the nationwide lockdown due to the COVID-19 pandemic, Delfont Mackintosh Theatres Ltd laid off most of the theatre's staff and in August 2020 they were facing redundancy.

== Recent and current productions ==
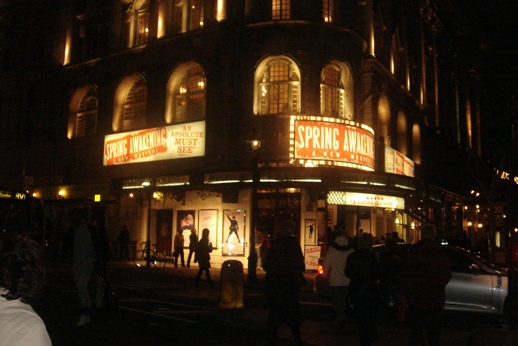
Spring Awakening at the Novello, March 2009

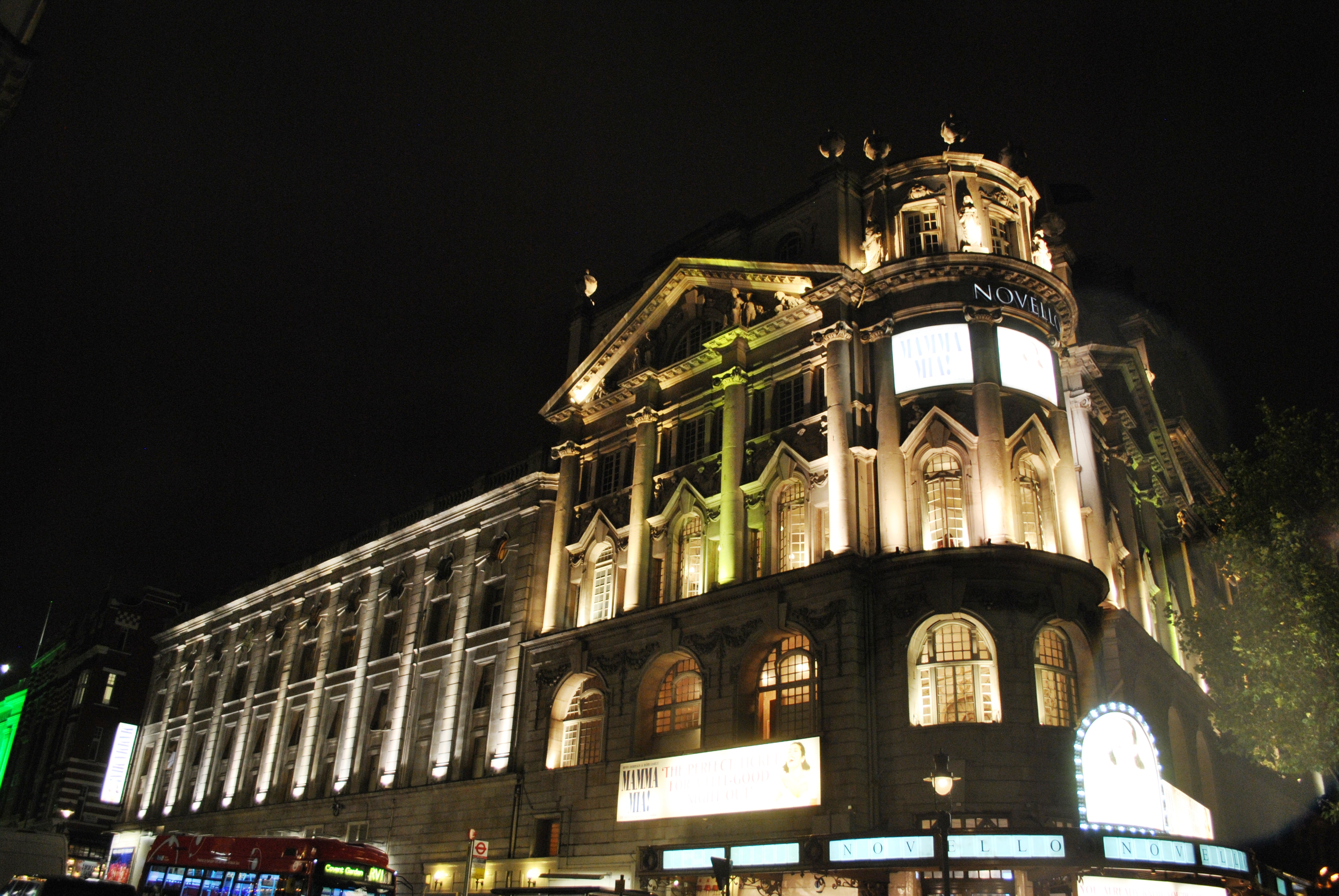
Mamma Mia! at Novello Theatre

- No Sex Please, We're British (3 June 1971 – 16 January 1982)
- The Real Thing (16 November 1982 – 16 February 1985)
- Cabaret (17 July 1986 – 4 May 1987)
- Someone Like You (22 March 1990 – 26 April 1990)
- Leonardo the Musical: A Portrait of Love (3 June 1993 – 10 July 1993)
- Buddy (6 October 1995 – 3 March 2002)
- The Rat Pack: Live from Las Vegas (1 July 2003 – 28 May 2005)
- The RSC's Twelfth Night (8 December 2005 – 31 December 2005)
- The RSC's The Comedy of Errors (6 January 2006 – 28 January 2006)
- The RSC's A Midsummer Night's Dream (2 February 2006 – 25 February 2006)
- The RSC's As You Like It (2 March 2006 – 25 March 2006)
- Footloose – The Musical (8 April 2006 – 11 November 2006)
- The RSC's Much Ado About Nothing (7 December 2006 – 6 January 2007)
- The RSC's Antony and Cleopatra (11 January 2007 – 17 February 2007)
- The RSC's The Tempest (22 February 2007 – 24 March 2007)
- The Drowsy Chaperone (6 June 2007 – 4 August 2007)
- Desperately Seeking Susan – A New Musical (15 November 2007 – 15 December
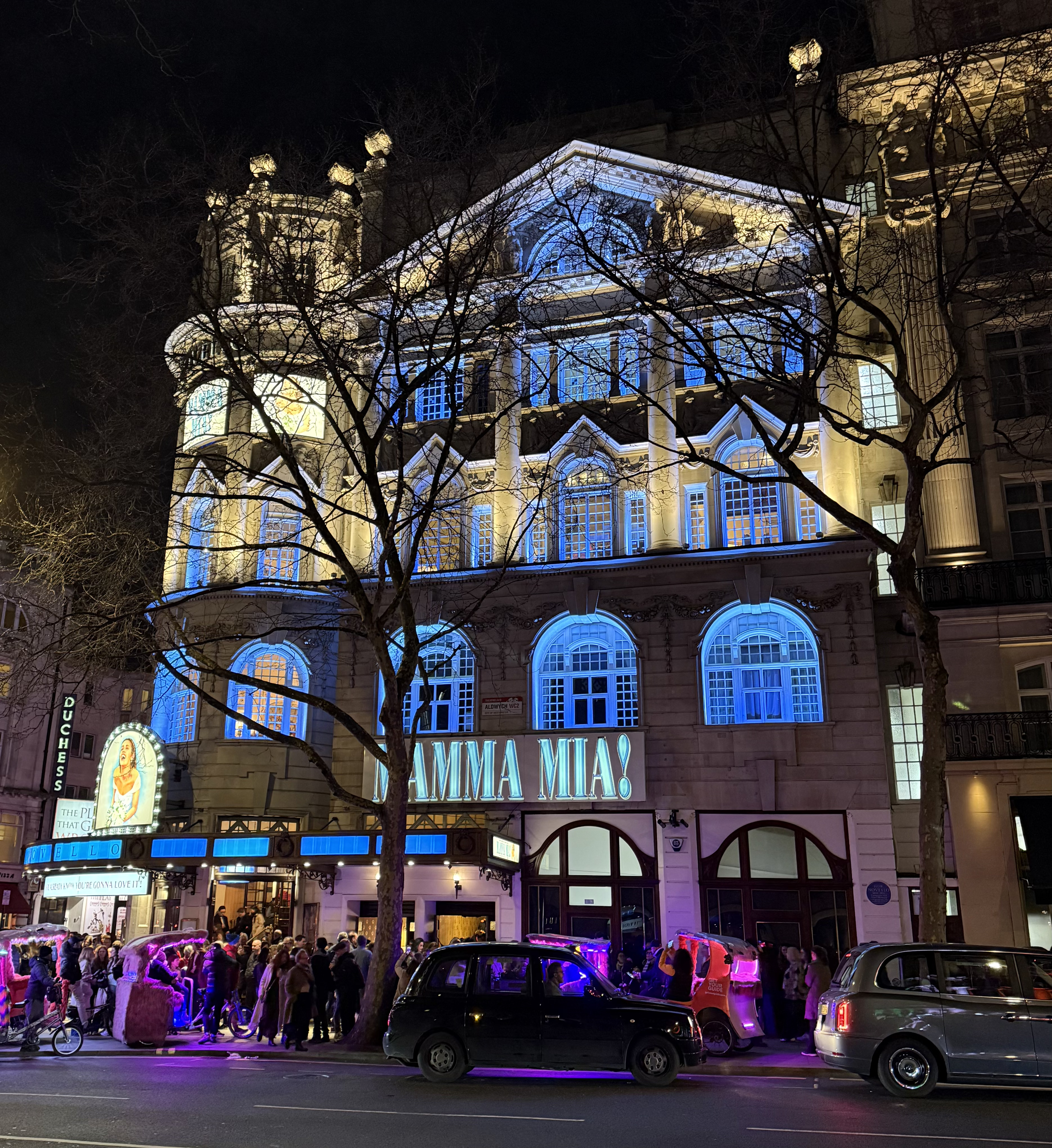
  The theatre at night in 2025
  2007)
- Shadowlands (21 December 2007 – 23 February 2008)
- Into the Hoods (14 March 2008 – 30 August 2008)
- Eürobeat: Almost Eurovision (9 September 2008 – 1 November 2008)
- The RSC's Hamlet (3 December 2008 – 10 January 2009)
- The RSC's A Midsummer Night's Dream (15 January 2009 – 7 February 2009)
- The RSC's The Taming of the Shrew (12 February 2009 – 7 March 2009)
- Spring Awakening (21 March 2009 – 30 May 2009)
- An Inspector Calls (22 September 2009 – 14 November 2009)
- Cat On A Hot Tin Roof (12 December 2009 – 10 April 2010)
- Grumpy Old Women Live 2 – Chin Up Britain (14 April – 5 June 2010)
- Tap Dogs (15 June 2010 – 5 September 2010)
- Onassis (12 October 2010 – 8 January 2011)
- Betty Blue Eyes (19 March 2011 – 24 September 2011)
- Crazy for You (8 October 2011 – 17 March 2012)
- Noises Off (24 March 2012 – 30 June 2012)
- Derren Brown: Svengali Tour (9 July 2012 – 11 August 2012)
- Mamma Mia! (6 September 2012 –)
