= The Mirror and the Light (play) =

2021 play

- Poster for the West End production
- Written by: Hilary Mantel; Ben Miles
- Based on: The Mirror and the Light by Hillary Mantel
- Setting: Sixteenth century England

Premiere
- Date: 23 September 2021
- Place: Gielgud Theatre, London

The Mirror and the Light is a play by Hilary Mantel and Ben Miles based on Mantel's 2020 book of the same name. It is the third part to Wolf Hall Parts One & Two which is a double-bill play based on Mantel's novels Wolf Hall and Bring Up the Bodies.

== Production history ==
Following the award-winning West End and Broadway productions of Wolf Hall Parts One & Two, the stage adaptation of The Mirror and the Light was originally produced by the Royal Shakespeare Company (with Playful Productions) and opened in London's West End at the Gielgud Theatre from 23 September to run until 28 November 2021. Co-adapter Ben Miles reprised his role as Thomas Cromwell with Nathaniel Parker reprising his role Henry VIII. The play was directed by Jeremy Herrin, designed by Christopher Oram with music by Stephen Warbeck. On 22 July 2021 further casting was announced. The play was also announced to extend its run until 23 January 2022, however it was later announced that the extension would be cancelled and the play closed on its original date of 28 November 2021.

== Characters and original cast ==
Character	West End
Character	2021
Thomas Cromwell	Ben Miles
King Henry VIII	Nathaniel Parker
Anne of Cleves	Rosanna Adams
Christophe & Edward Seymour	Paul Adeyefa
Princess Mary	Melissa Allan
Ensemble	Samuel Awoyo
Duke of Suffolk	Nicholas Boulton
Elizabeth Seymour	Aurora Dawson-Hunte
French Ambassador	Ian Drysdale
Ensemble	Mark Extance
Lady Rochford / Abness	Jo Herbert
Ensemble	Andrew Hodges
Ensemble	Niahm James
Gregory Cromwell	Terique Jarrett
Ralph Sadler	Jordan Kouamé
Thomas Wriothesley	Geoffrey Lumb
Jane Seymour & Katherine Howard	Olivia Marcus
Helen Sadler & Dorothea Wolsey	Umi Myers
Eustace Chapuys	Matthew Pidgeon
Walter Cromwell / Holbein	Liam Smith
Archbishop Cranmer	Giles Taylor
Kingston & The Ghost of Wolsey	Tony Turner
Richard Riche	Leo Wan
Duke of Norfolk	Nicholas Woodeson

== See also ==
- Cultural depictions of Henry VIII
- Wolf Hall Parts One & Two – a 2013 two-part stage adaptation of the first two parts of Mantel's trilogy
