= Jeremy Herrin =

English theatre director

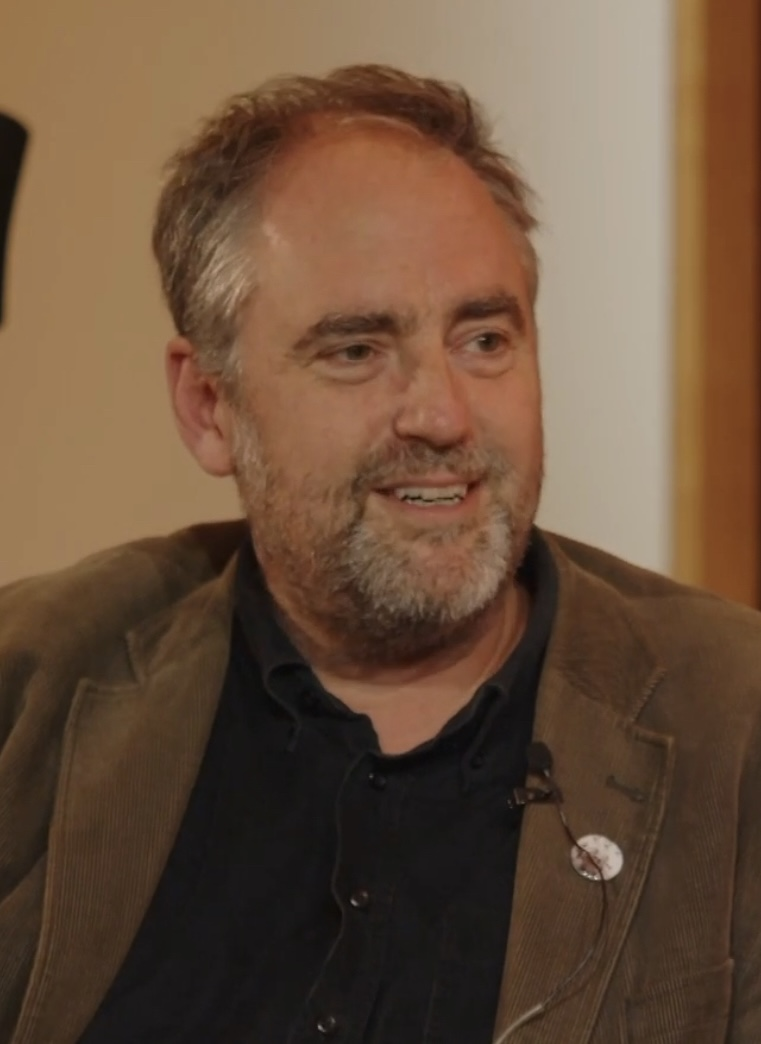
- Herrin at the British Library in 2023
- Born: 19 January 1970 (age 56); New York City USA
- Education: Royal Conservatoire of Scotland
- Occupation: Theatre director
- Years active: 1999–present
- Partner: Deborah Bruce
- Children: 2
- Website: https://www.secondhalfproductions.co.uk/

Jeremy Herrin (born 19 January 1970) is an English theatre director. He is a founding director of Second Half Productions with Alan Stacey and Rob O'Rahilly. He was previously artistic director of the British touring theatre company Headlong.

For his work on the London stage, Herrin has received three Laurence Olivier Awards, for Labour of Love, The Heretic and The Priory. He won the Evening Standard Theatre Award for best director and was nominated for the Laurence Olivier Award for Best Director for Wolf Hall Parts One & Two. His production of James Graham's This House at the Royal National Theatre received a nomination for the Evening Standard Theatre Award for Best Play.

Working as a theatre director since 1999, Herrin has directed several productions that have transferred to the West End and Broadway. Notable productions include the adaptation of Hilary Mantel's novels Wolf Hall & Bringing Up the Bodies for the RSC, which transferred to West End (2014) and Broadway (2015). People Places and Things by Duncan Macmillan at the National Theatre (2015) starring Denise Gough who won a Laurence Olivier Award for Best Actress and which was recently revived at the Trafalgar Theatre (2024). Ulster American by David Ireland at the Riverside Studios (2023) starring Woody Harrelson. The revival of Eugene O'Neill's Long Days Journey into Night at the Wyndham's Theatre (2024) starring Patricia Clarkson and Brian Cox.

In 2022 his production of Graham's Best of Enemies was announced winner of the South Bank Sky Arts Award.

His most recent production, the John le Carré novel, The Spy Who Came in From the Cold adapted for the stage by David Eldridge, was performed at Chichester Festival Theatre in Autumn 2024.

== Career ==
Having trained at the Royal Scottish Academy of Music and Drama in Glasgow, Herrin was appointed as an assistant director at the Royal Court Theatre, London, under Stephen Daldry from 1993 to 1995. Following this role he became a staff director at the National Theatre from 1995 to 1999. In 2000 he became associate director at Live Theatre, Newcastle upon Tyne, where his directing credits include plays by Richard Bean and Joe Harbot. He remained at Live Theatre until 2007.

His breakthrough show was the critically successful That Face by Polly Stenham at the Royal Court Upstairs in 2007, which subsequently transferred to the West End in 2008. In 2009 he was nominated for the Evening Standard Award for Best Director for Stenham's Tusk Tusk. He became the deputy artistic director at the Royal Court Theatre to Dominic Cooke in 2009. Whilst at the Royal Court Theatre, he directed a number of new plays including Spur of the Moment by Anya Reiss, Richard Bean's The Heretic, No Quarter, by Polly Stenham, in 2013 and in 2008 the UK premiere of David Hare's The Vertical Hour starring Indira Varma and Anton Lesser receiving critical acclaim.

Herrin made his Shakespearean debut at the Globe Theatre in 2011, directing Eve Best in Much Ado About Nothing. 2011 also saw Herrin direct several West End productions, including the world premiere and West End transfer of Hare's South Downs, a drama set at Lancing College an English public school. The production starred Anna Chancellor with a company of young actors and was the theatrical debut of Alex Lawther. South Downs was performed in the Minerva Theatre at Chichester Festival Theatre in September 2011 and transferred to the Harold Pinter Theatre in the West End in April 2012, produced by Neal Street Productions.

Herrin opened a well-received revival of Alan Ayckbourn's dark comedy Absent Friends at the Harold Pinter Theatre in 2012, produced by Sonia Friedman Productions. Variety described the production; "It's not just the number of laughs that impresses in Jeremy Herrin's knockout production of Alan Ayckbourn's "Absent Friends," it's the length of them." The production opened in February 2012 with a star cast including, Kara Tointon, Reece Shearsmith, Katherine Parkinson, David Armand, Elizabeth Berrington and Steffan Rhodri.

In 2013 he directed Roger Allam in The Tempest at Shakespeare's Globe. This same year he directed the This House by James Graham at the National Theatre and was nominated for Laurence Olivier Award for Best Director. The play received a nomination for the Evening Standard Theatre Award for Best Play.

His esteemed world premiere production of two plays adapted from Hilary Mantel's Man Booker Prize winning novels Wolf Hall and Bring Up the Bodies: Wolf Hall Parts One & Two. These were produced as two three-hour dramatised instalments and opened at the Royal Shakespeare Company in December 2013 before transferring to the Aldwych Theatre in 2014 for a limited run and subsequently transferring to the Winter Garden Theatre, Broadway in 2015. This production won numerous awards and saw Herrin win Best Director at the Evening Standard Awards 2014 and earned him nominations for the Best Director at the Laurence Olivier Awards 2015; Best Direction of Play at the Tony Awards 2015; Outstanding Direction of a Play at the Drama Desk Awards 2015 and Outstanding Director of a Play at the Outer Critics Circle Awards 2015.

In 2021 he directed the stage adaptation of Mantel's third novel in the trilogy The Mirror and the Light, which he co-adapted with Mantel. It played at the Gielgud Theatre and received positive reviews. Nick Curtis of the Evening Standard calling it a "magnificent theatrical hat-trick".

In 2013, Herrin succeeded Rupert Goold as the artistic director of Headlong which he ran until 2020. Whilst at the helm of Headlong he directed a number of hit productions including; the sold out and multi award winning production of Jennifer Haley's The Nether, set in a digital future of virtual realms and imagined spaces, at The Royal Court Theatre with a transfer to the Duke of York's in 2015. The multi-award winning People, Places and Things by Duncan Macmillan at the National Theatre and Labour of Love by James Graham, at the Noël Coward theatre featuring Martin Freeman and Tamsin Greig which won the Laurence Olivier Award for Best Comedy in 2018.

In 2020, in partnership with producers Alan Stacey and Rob O’Rahilly, he founded the production company Second Half Productions.

In 2022 he directed Amy Adams, who made her West End debut, in a production of Tennessee Williams' The Glass Menagerie, his inaugural production for Second Half Productions.

His production of Best of Enemies based on the acclaimed documentary by Robert Gordon and Morgan Neville transferred from the Young Vic theatre to the West End, winning the South Bank Show’s best Production award. The show was broadcast on National Theatre Live and is available as part of the NT at Home subscription.

2024 has been a very active year for Herrin seeing him take on multiple large projects. in Autumn 2024 he staged the John le Carré novel, The Spy Who Came in From the Cold adapted for the stage by David Eldridge. This was the first time a le Carré novel had been granted rights for the stage. It played a sold-out run to great acclaim, with The Stage describing it as having a, "stylish, cinematic treatment". The production starred Rory Keenan as Alec Leamas, Agnes O'Casey as Elizabeth Gold and John Ramm as George Smiley. It was performed at Chichester Festival Theatre in the Minerva Theatre. The set design was by long term collaborator, Max Jones. It was a co-production between Chichester Festival Theatre, Second Half Productions and the Ink Factory.

In 2027, he will direct a revival of Peter Shaffer's Amadeus starring Michael Sheen and Callum Scott Howells for the Welsh National Theatre, opening at the New Theatre, Cardiff in from 9 to 27 March, before transferring to the Noël Coward Theatre in London's West End from 17 April to 7 August. He will also direct The Humans by Jack Thorne, based on Matt Haig's 2013 novel from 30 October to 28 January 2028, starring Matt Haig.

== Philosophy ==
Herrin describes himself as the archetypal Royal Court Theatre director, putting the writer before the director:

You never want anything onstage that the writer doesn’t like. You need them to be entirely proud. What you want is to give them the deluxe version of their play... I try to disappear into the work. I’d hate for someone to say, in the way they do about other directors, ‘That’s a very Jeremy Herrin production.’ Ego’s a really dangerous thing in theatre. It’s a collegiate enterprise.

Herrin has described his approach to his craft as;

“Directing is finding a language of performance – finding a bridge between an audience and a dramatic work. Allowing that synthesis to create something completely new. Sometimes the most invisible bit of directing is the most important.”

“Dramatic currency isn’t always best served by viscera or shock or loudness; the tiniest transaction in context can be massively important.”

Known to be a director that actors enjoy working with, Martin Freeman, who has worked with Herrin on multiple projects, described working with Herrin; “He’s very good at picking up little details that I miss, gently suggesting a different colour here and there.”

He is known for his positive attitude towards his audiences: "People aren't interested in coming to a place of entertainment to be told what to think. They like to chew over contradictions and difficult questions but they want to be entertained.” In an article in The Guardian about his production of Wolf Hall he described, ‘“I don’t like to keep audiences waiting.” Discussing the adaptations, Herrin repeatedly mentions the importance of "moving forwards", stressing the dynamism of his approach.’

Herrin has expressed his belief that theatre has a role as a mirror to society. He believes theatre should engage with the political and social issues of the time. “There’s a responsibility on theatre-makers to reflect the world we live in.” Whilst he was the Artistic Director of Headlong, Britain voted to leave the European Union. He was vocal about the impact of Brexit on British theatre, emphasizing the need for the arts to address the divided nature of the UK. In an article by Tara Doolabh in 2016, Herrin expressed that, “Theatre is all about looking out and making connections”. “Brexit”, he continues, “is a reaction against that sort of energy, a desire to stop certain conversations”.

Shortly after Brexit, in Autumn 2016, This House was remounted at Chichester Festival Theatre and the West End. In conversation with James Graham about the return of the play for London Theatre, Herrin chose to seat audience members on stage, “We wanted to show the feverish nature of what the chamber was like and that isn't 600 people on a busy vote night, so we're recruiting the audience on the benches onstage, they're very welcome to vote with us."

Herrin has been instrumental in the founding of Stage Directors UK, an organisation and trade union that aims to protect the interests of and create better terms and conditions for stage directors, choreographers and movement directors working in the UK.

== Theatre ==
Stage productions directed by Jeremy Herrin
Year	Title	Author	Theatre	Notes
2027	The Humans	Matt Haig adapted by Jack Thorne	Theatre Royal Haymarket	
2027	Amadeus	Peter Shaffer	New Theatre Cardiff; Noël Coward Theatre	
2025	Grace Pervades	David Hare	Theatre Royal Bath (2026 Theatre Royal, Haymarket)	
2024	The Spy Who Came in From the Cold	John le Carré adapted by David Eldridge	Chichester Festival Theatre	
2024	People, Places and Things	Duncan Macmillan	Trafalgar Theatre	
2024	Long Day's Journey into Night	Eugene O'Neill	Wyndham's Theatre	
2024	A Mirror	Sam Holcroft	Trafalgar Theatre	
2023	Ulster American	David Ireland	Riverside Studios	
2023	A Mirror	Sam Holcroft	Almeida Theatre Transferred to Trafalgar Theatre, 2024	
2021	Best of Enemies	James Graham	Young Vic Transferred to West End, 2023	South Bank Sky Arts Award Winner: Best Theatre Production
2021	After Life	Jack Thorne	Royal National Theatre - Dorfman Stage	
2020	The Visit, or The Old Lady Comes to Call	Friedrich Dürrenmett adapted by Tony Kushner	Royal National Theatre - Olivier Stage	
2019	All My Sons	Arthur Miller	The Old Vic	
2017	Labour of Love	James Graham	Noël Coward Theatre	Laurence Olivier Award Winner: Best Comedy
2017	The House They Grew Up In	Deborah Bruce	Chichester Festival Theatre	
2017	Common	D. C. Moore	Royal National Theatre - Olivier Stage	
2017	Junkyard	Jack Thorne	Bristol Old Vic, Theatr Clwyd and Rose Theatre, Kingston	
2016	The Plough and the Stars	Seán O’Casey	Royal National Theatre Lyttelton Stage	
2016	Observe the Sons of Ulster Marching Towards the Somme	Frank McGuinness	International Tour	
2015	People, Places and Things	Duncan Macmillan	Royal National Theatre - Dorfman Stage, 2016. Transfer to Wyndham's Theatre, West End, 2017. Transfer to St. Ann's Warehouse, New York. UK Tour, 2017.	Laurence Olivier Awards, 2016 Winner: Best Actress - Denise Gough
2015	The Absence of War	David Hare	UK Tour	
2014	The Nether	Jennifer Haley	Royal Court Theatre - 2015 transfer to Duke of York's Theatre	
2013	Wolf Hall Parts One & Two	Hilary Mantel adapted for the stage by Mike Poulton	Swan Theatre, Stratford upon-Avon, 2013. Transferred to Aldwych Theatre, 2014. Transferred to the Winter Garden Theatre, Broadway, 2015.	Laurence Olivier Awards 2015: Winner: Best Costume Design - Christopher Oram Winner: Laurence Olivier Award for Best Actor in a Supporting Role - Nathaniel Parker Nominated: Best New Play Nominated: Best Director - Jeremy Herrin Nominated: Best Lighting Design - Paule Constable and David Plater Evening Standard Awards 2014: Winner: Best Director - Jeremy Herrin Nominated: Best Actor - Ben Miles Tony Awards 2015: Based on the novels Wolf Hall and Bring Up the Bodies
2012	This House	James Graham	National Theatre - 2016 Transfer to Chichester Festival Theatre and Garrick Theatre, 2018. UK Tour 2018.	Nominated for 2013 Laurence Olivier Award for Best Director
2012	Children's Children	Matthew Dunster	Almeida Theatre	
2012	Absent Friends	Alan Ayckbourn	Harold Pinter Theatre	
2011	Uncle Vanya	Anton Chekhov	Chichester Festival Theatre	
2011	Death and the Maiden	Ariel Dorfman	Harold Pinter Theatre	
2011	Haunted Child	Joe Penhall	Royal Court Theatre	
2011	South Downs	David Hare	Minerva Theatre, Chichester Transfer to Harold Pinter Theatre, West End, 2012.	
2011	Much Ado About Nothing	William Shakespeare	Globe Theatre	
2011	The Heretic	Richard Bean	Royal Court Theatre	Winner Best New Play Laurence Olivier Award
2010	Kin	E.V. Crowe	Royal Court Theatre	
2010	Spur of the Moment	Anya Reiss	Royal Court Theatre	Nominated for Evening Standard Award Best Director
2010	The Laws of War	various authors	Royal Court Theatre	
2009	The Priory	Michael Wynne	Royal Court Theatre	Winner 2010 Best Comedy Laurence Olivier Award
2009	Tusk, Tusk	Polly Stenham	Royal Court Theatre	Nominated for Evening Standard Award Best Director
2009	Marble	Marina Carr	Abbey Theatre	
2008	The Family Reunion	T.S. Eliot	Donmar Warehouse	
2008	The Vertical Hour	David Hare	Royal Court Theatre	
2007	Statement of Regret	Kwame Kwei-Armah	National Theatre	
2007	Blackbird	David Harrower	The Market Theatre	
2007	That Face	Polly Stenham	Royal Court Theatre	Nominated for Best New Play in the Laurence Olivier Awards
2007	Gathered Dust and Dead Skin	Joe Harbot	Live Theatre	
2005	The Lovers	Bridget O'Connor	Live Theatre	
2004	Our Kind of Fun	Alice de Smith	Live Theatre	
2004	Toast (new version)	Richard Bean	Live Theatre	
2004	Sudden Collapses in Public Places	Julia Darling	Live Theatre	
2004	Dirty Nets	Karen Laws	Live Theatre	
2003	Smack Family Robinson	Richard Bean	Live Theatre	
2002	Attachments	Julia Darling	Live Theatre	
2001	From the Underworld	Sean O'Brien	Live Theatre	
2000	The Last Post	Julia Darling	Live Theatre then tour in County Durham, Northumberland and Cumbria	
1999	Personal Belongings	Julia Darling	Live Theatre	

== Television ==
Television productions directed by Jeremy Herrin
Year	Title	Author	Producer	Notes
2020	Unprecedented	James Graham, Charlene James, John Donnelly	BBC1	Series written and filmed in lockdown that responds to the radical way we have seen our world change during the coronavirus pandemic
	Talking Heads	Alan Bennett	BBC1	New versions of Alan Bennett's much-loved monologues, with performers including Sarah Lancashire, Martin Freeman, Kristin Scott-Thomas, Jodie Comer and Maxine Peake

== Film ==
Film productions directed by Jeremy Herrin
Year	Title	Author	Producer	Notes
2007	Linked	Joe Harbot	Bonafide Films	Starring Darren Howie, Paul Trussell
2003	Cold Calling	Julia Darling	Tyne Tees Television	24” short, shot on digital
2003	Warmth	Julia Darling		6” short, shot on digital
2010	Dead Terry	Bridget O’Connor		12” short, shot on digital
In development	The Inventor	Peter Straughan	Film 4	Feature Film currently in development

== Radio ==
Radio productions directed by Jeremy Herrin
Year	Title	Author	Producer	Notes
2012	South Downs	David Hare	Catherine Bailey Limited for BBC Radio 4	Radio adaptation of the Chichester Festival Theatre production of South Downs. Starring: Nicholas Farrell, Alex Lawther, Jonathan Bailey, Andrew Woodall, Bradley Hall
2011	Flare Path	Terence Rattigan	Catherine Bailey Limited for BBC Radio 3	Radio adaptation of the Terence Rattigan play. Starring: Rory Kinnear, Rupert Penry Jones, Ruth Wilson
