= Cultural depictions of Henry VIII =

Overview of Henry VIII's portrayals in cultural media

Portrait of Henry VIII by Hans Holbein the Younger, c. 1537–1547

Henry VIII and his reign have frequently been depicted in art, film, literature, music, opera, plays, and television.

== Art ==
- Lucas de Heere: The Family of Henry VIII
- Hans Eworth: Henry VIII (c. 1545)
- Hans Holbein the Younger: Portrait of Henry VIII, The Dynasty Portrait, and Henry VIII and the Barber-Surgeons (1540)
- Lucas Horenbout: Untitled Miniature of King Henry (c. 1526)
- Daniel Maclise: Henry Meeting Anne at Hampton Court
- Guido Mazzoni: Untitled Bust of Prince Henry (c. 1498)
- Joos van Cleve: Henry VIII (c. 1535)
- Willard Wigan: The Six Wives of Henry VIII

== Film ==
- Henry VIII (1911): Arthur Bourchier
- Cardinal Wolsey (1912): Tefft Johnson
- Anna Boleyn (1920): Emil Jannings
- The Prince and the Pauper (1920): Albert Schreiber
- When Knighthood Was in Flower (1922): Lyn Harding
- The Private Life of Henry VIII (1933): Charles Laughton (for which Laughton won the Academy Award for Best Actor)
- Henry the Ache (1934, Short): Bert Lahr
- Tudor Rose (1936): Frank Cellier
- The Pearls of the Crown (1937): Lyn Harding
- The Prince and the Pauper (1937): Montagu Love
- Book Revue (1946): Mel Blanc
- The Sword and the Rose (1953): James Robertson Justice
- Young Bess (1953): Charles Laughton
- A Man for All Seasons (1966): Robert Shaw (for which Shaw was nominated for the Academy Award for Best Supporting Actor)
- Anne of the Thousand Days (1969): Richard Burton (for which Burton was nominated for the Academy Award for Best Actor)
- Carry On Henry (1971): Sid James
- Henry VIII and His Six Wives (1972): Keith Michell
- The Prince and the Pauper (1977): Charlton Heston
- God's Outlaw (1986): Keith Barron
- U.F.O. (1993): Rusty Goffe
- Aladdin and the Adventure of All Time (2000): Jim Cummings and Stuart Pankin
- Monarch (2000): T.P. McKenna
- Intolerable Cruelty (2003): Miles references Henry
- The Other Boleyn Girl (2008): Eric Bana
- Inside Llewyn Davis (2013): Llewyn performs a song about Henry and Jane Seymour for Grossman
- Firebrand (2023): Jude Law

== Internet ==
- Epic Rap Battles of History: Henry VIII is featured in a canceled, but later launched, episode of the webseries in a rap battle with Hillary Clinton. In the conflict, comparisons between the king's intimate life and the Monicagate controversy are made.

== Literature ==
- Suzannah Dunn: The Confessions of Katherine Howard, The Queen of Subtleties, and The Sixth Wife
- Carolly Erickson: The First Elizabeth, Mistress Anne, and The Last Wife of Henry VIII
- Antonia Fraser: The Six Wives of Henry VIII (1993)
- Margaret George: The Autobiography of Henry VIII
- Philippa Gregory: The Other Boleyn Girl
- Diane Haeger: The Secret Bride, The Queen's Mistake, The Queen's Rival, I, Jane
- Cynthia Harrod-Eagles: The Morland Dynasty, and "The Dark Rose"
- Virginia Henley: A Woman of Passion
- Eleanor Hibbert: Shadow of the Pomegranate, Katharine the Virgin Widow, King's Secret Matter, The Lady in the Tower: The Wives of Henry VIII, Murder Most Royal, Mary, Queen of France, St. Thomas's Eve, and The Sixth Wife
- Ivery Kirk, Luna Teague: One Does Not Simply Walk into Tudor
- Charles Major: When Knighthood Was in Flower
- Hilary Mantel: Wolf Hall, Bring Up the Bodies and The Mirror & the Light
- Maureen Peters: Henry VIII and His Six Wives (a novelization of the 1972 film)
- C. J. Sansom: Dissolution, Dark Fire and Sovereign
- David Starkey: Non-Fiction - Six Wives: The Queens of Henry VIII, The Reign of Henry VIII: The Personalities and Politics, Monarchy: From the Middle Ages to Modernity, Henry: Virtuous Prince, Henry: Model of a Tyrant, Henry VIII: A European Court in England
- Shelly Talcott: Fall of the House of Queens: Book One of the Shattered Rose Series
- Mark Twain: The Prince and the Pauper
- Alison Weir: Non-Fiction - Henry VIII: The King and His Court, Elizabeth the Queen/The Life of Elizabeth I, Children of England: The Heirs of King Henry VIII, and The Six Wives of Henry VIII, and Fiction - The Lady Elizabeth, Katherine of Aragon: The True Queen, Anne Boleyn: A King's Obsession, Jane Seymour: The Haunted Queen, and Anna of Kleve: Queen of Secrets

== Music ==
- Bert Lee: "With Her Head Tucked Underneath Her Arm" co-written with R. P. Weston; recorded by Stanley Holloway, The Kingston Trio, The Barron Knights, and Rudy Vallee
- David Munrow: Henry VIII and His Six Wives (soundtrack album)
- Rick Wakeman: The Six Wives of Henry VIII and The Six Wives of Henry VIII Live at Hampton Court Palace
- R. P. Weston: "I'm Henery the Eighth, I Am"; recorded by Harry Champion, Joe Brown, and Herman's Hermits

== Opera ==
- Gaetano Donizetti: Anna Bolena
- Camille Saint-Saëns: Henri VIII

== Plays ==
- Maxwell Anderson: Anne of the Thousand Days, originally played by Rex Harrison
- Robert Bolt: A Man for All Seasons (1960), originally played by Richard Leech
- Howard Brenton: Anne Boleyn, originally played by Anthony Howell
- Pedro Calderón de la Barca: La cisma de Inglaterra/The Schism in England
- Hilary Mantel and Ben Miles: The Mirror and the Light, originally played by Nathaniel Parker
- Toby Marlow and Lucy Moss: Six: The Musical, in which Henry never appears but is characterized at length by each of his wives, who are competing to be lead singer of the girl group they have formed
- Mike Poulton: Wolf Hall and Bring Up the Bodies (a.k.a. Wolf Hall Parts One & Two), originally played by Nathaniel Parker
- William Shakespeare: The Famous History of the Life of King Henry the Eighth

== Radio ==
- A Man for All Seasons (David Scase, BBC Radio 4, 1959)
- A Man for All Seasons (Brian Cox, BBC Radio 4, 2006)
- Crowned Hudds: "Fourth Wedding and Some Funerals" (John Glover, BBC Radio 2, 1995)
- Henry VIII (Matthew Marsh, BBC Radio 3, 2009)
- The Ghostbuster Diaries: "My Three Ladies" (Paul Darrow, BBC Radio 4, 2011)
- The Six Mothers-in-Law of Henry VIII (Jonathan Coy, BBC Radio 4, 2003)

== Television ==
- A Man for All Seasons (Martin Chamberlain)
- Bewitched: "How Not to Lose Your Head to Henry VIII, Parts 1 & 2" (Ronald Long)
- Carlos, rey emperador (2015) (Àlex Brendemühl)
- Disneyland: "The Prince and the Pauper" (Paul Rogers)
- DuPont Show of the Month: "The Prince and the Pauper" (Douglas Campbell)
- Henry VIII (John Stride)
- Henry VIII (2000) (Philippe Rouillon)
- Henry VIII (Ray Winstone, Sid Mitchell)
- Henry VIII at Shakespeare's Globe (2012) (Dominic Rowan)
- Henry VIII: Mind of a Tyrant (Laurence Spellman/Adam James/Ian Redford)
- Histeria!: "The Terrible Tudors" (1998)
- Horrible Histories (Ben Willbond/Rowan Atkinson/Tom Stourton)
- I Dream of Jeannie: "The Girl Who Never Had a Birthday, Part 2" (Jack Fife)
- Inside the Court of Henry VIII (2015) (John Sandeman)
- The Madness of Henry VIII: National Geographic Channel (Dan Astileanu)
- The Nearly Complete and Utter History of Everything (1999) (Brian Blessed)
- Omnibus: "The Trial of Anne Boleyn" (Rex Harrison)
- The Other Boleyn Girl (Jared Harris)
- The Prince and the Pauper (1976) (Ronald Radd)
- The Prince and the Pauper (1996) (Keith Michell)
- The Prince and the Pauper (2000) (Alan Bates)
- Relic Hunter: "The Royal Ring" (Michael Hofland)
- Rose Without A Thorn (1958) (Kevin Brennan)
- The Simpsons: "Margical History Tour" (Dan Castellaneta as Homer Simpson)
- Six Wives with Lucy Worsley (2016) (Scott Arthur)
- The Six Wives of Henry VIII (Keith Michell)
- The Six Wives of Henry VIII (2001) (Chris Larkin and Andy Rashleigh)
- The Spanish Princess (2019) (Ruairi O'Connor)
- The Tudors (Jonathan Rhys Meyers)
- Wolf Hall (2015) (Damian Lewis)
- Wolf Hall: The Mirror and the Light (2024) (Damian Lewis)
- The White Princess (2017) (Woody Norman)

== See also ==
- List of William Shakespeare screen adaptations
- Cultural depictions of Catherine of Aragon
- Cultural depictions of Anne Boleyn
