= 2022 Black British Theatre Awards =

Annual theatre award held in the UK

The Black British Theatre Awards (BBTA) were launched in 2019 and recognise excellence among black performers and creatives in the UK.

The 2022 Black British Theatre Awards winners and nominees were:

Best Play	Best Musical
For Black Boys Who Have Considered Suicide When the Hue; Gets Too Heavy at the Royal Court Theatre; My Voice Was Heard But It Was Ignored, Red Ladder Theatre Company (UK Tour); Things I Can Laugh About Now at Brixton House	Domitius at Conway Hall; Dreamgirls, UK & Ireland Tour; The Wiz at the Hope Mill Theatre
Best Male Actor in a Play	Best Male Actor in a Musical
Michael Fatogun in Foxes at Theatre503; Terique Jarrett in Daddy at the Almeida Theatre; Dior Clarke in Passionfruit at the New Diorama Theatre	Michael Duke in Get Up Stand Up! The Bob Marley Musical at the Lyric Theatre; Michael Ahomka-Lindsay in Legally Blonde at Regent's Park Open Air Theatre; Tarik Frimpong in The Wiz at the Hope Mill Theatre
Best Female Actor in a Play	Best Female Actor in a Musical
Selina Jones in An unfinished man at The Yard Theatre; Shareesa Valentine in Forgotten Voices at the Hope Mill Theatre; Shakira Newton in Things I Can Laugh About Now at Brixton House	Courtney Stapleton in Beauty and the Beast, UK & Ireland Tour; Courtney Bowman in Legally Blonde at Regent's Park Open Air Theatre; Nicole Raquel Dennis in Dreamgirls, UK & Ireland Tour
Best Supporting Male Actor in a Play	Best Supporting Male Actor in a Musical
Hayden Mampasi in Passionfruit at the New Diorama Theatre; Gabriel Paul in Macbeth at Leeds Playhouse; Habib Nasib Nader in Life of Pi at the Wyndham's Theatre	Jordan Shaw in Les Misérables at the Sondheim Theatre; Shem Omari James in Dreamgirls, UK & Ireland Tour; Cameron Bernard Jones in The Wiz at the Hope Mill Theatre
Best Supporting Female Actor in a Play	Best Supporting Female Actor in a Musical
Sasha Frost in Folk at the Hampstead Theatre; Ashh Blackwood in The Play That Goes Wrong at the Duchess Theatre; Charlotte Gosling in Passionfruit at the New Diorama Theatre	Nicolle Smartt in Domitius at Conway Hall; Nadine Higgin in Legally Blonde at Regent's Park Open Air Theatre; Jocasta Almgill in Grease at the Dominion Theatre
Outstanding Performance in a Play	Outstanding Performance in a Musical
Misha Duncan-Barry in My Voice Was Heard But It Was Ignored, Red Ladder Theatre Company (UK Tour); Rochelle Rose in Rockets and Blue Lights at the National Theatre; Emmanuel Akwafo in For Black Boys Who Have Considered Suicide; When the Hue Gets Too Heavy at the Royal Court Theatre	Amara Okereke in My Fair Lady at the London Coliseum; Billy Nevers in Legally Blonde at Regent's Park Open Air Theatre; Nicole Raquel Dennis in Dreamgirls, UK & Ireland Tour

Creatives Awards
Best Director for a Play or Musical	Best Producer
Ryan Calais Cameron and Tristan Fynn-Aiduenu for For Black Boys Who Have Considered Suicide When the Hue Gets Too Heavy at the Royal Court; Matthew Xia for The Wiz at the Hope Mill Theatre; Dermot Daly for My Voice Was Heard But It Was Ignored, Red Ladder Theatre Company (UK Tour)	Ameena Hamid for The Wiz at the Hope Mill Theatre; Jasmyn Fisher-Ryner For Black Boys Who Have Considered Suicide When the Hue Gets Too Heavy at the Royal Court; Shanay Holmes and Chris Steward for West End Musical Christmas at the Lyric Theatre
Best Choreographer or Movement Director	Best Dance Production
Leah Hill for The Wiz at the Hope Mill Theatre; Theophilus O. Bailey-Godson for For Black Boys Who Have Considered Suicide When the Hue Gets Too Heavy at the Royal Court; Kane Husbands and Mateus Daniel for Passionfruit at the New Diorama Theatre	Ballet Black's Ballet Black Double Bill at the Barbican Theatre; Talawa's Run it Back at Fairfield Halls; Gateway Arts Productions' Saturn Returns at Brixton House
Best Soloist in a Dance Production	Best Use of Innovation and Technology
Cira Robinson in Ballet Black Double Bill at the Barbican Theatre; Mthuthuzeli November in Ballet Black Double Bill at the Barbican Theatre; Isabela Coracy in Ballet Black Double Bill at the Barbican Theatre	Ballet Black for Eightfold, Channel 4; Mawa Theatre Company for What's Past is Prologue, YouTube; Natalie Edwards Yesufu for Enter.Stage.Write, YouTube
Best Opera Production or Performance	
April Koyejo-Audiger in Jenufa at the Royal Opera House; Pumeza Matshikiza in The Cunning Little Vixen at the London Coliseum	

Recognition Awards
Light and/or Sound Recognition Award	Costume Design Recognition Award
Kayodeine; Joshua Harriette; Simisola Majekodunmi	Jessica Cabassa; Maybelle Laye; Natalie Pryce
Book and Lyrics Recognition Award	Musical Director Recognition Award
Lux Knightley; Ryan Calais Cameron; Safaa Benson-Effiom	Sean Green for Get Up Stand Up! The Bob Marley Musical at the Lyric Theatre; Femi Temowo for Rockets and Blue Lights at the National Theatre; John Pfumojena for For Black Boys Who Have Considered Suicide When the Hue Gets; Too Heavy at the Royal Court
Casting Director Recognition Award	
Isabella Odoffin; Heather Basten; Tonia Daley Campbell	

Achievement Awards
LGBTQ+ Champion Award	Best Understudy/Swing in a Theatre Production
Nicole Raquel Dennis; Courtney Stapleton; Alex Thomas-Smith	Mitchell Zhangazha in Dear Evan Hansen at the Noël Coward Theatre; Jemal Felix in The Phantom of the Opera at Her Majesty’s Theatre; Zara MacIntosh in &Juliet at the Shaftesbury Theatre
Best Teacher	Best Recent Graduate Award
Hakeem Onibudo from Impact Dance; Angeline Bell from the Urdang Academy; Carolyn Elaine Bolton from Shockout Arts	Dianté Lodge from Laine Theatre Arts; Grace Melville from D&B Academy; Shonah Buwu from Bird College
Lifetime Achievement	
Charles Augins	

== See also ==
- Laurence Olivier Awards
- WhatsOnStage Awards
- Evening Standard Theatre Awards
- Tony Awards
- Drama Desk Awards
