= Christopher Oram =

British theatre set and costume designer

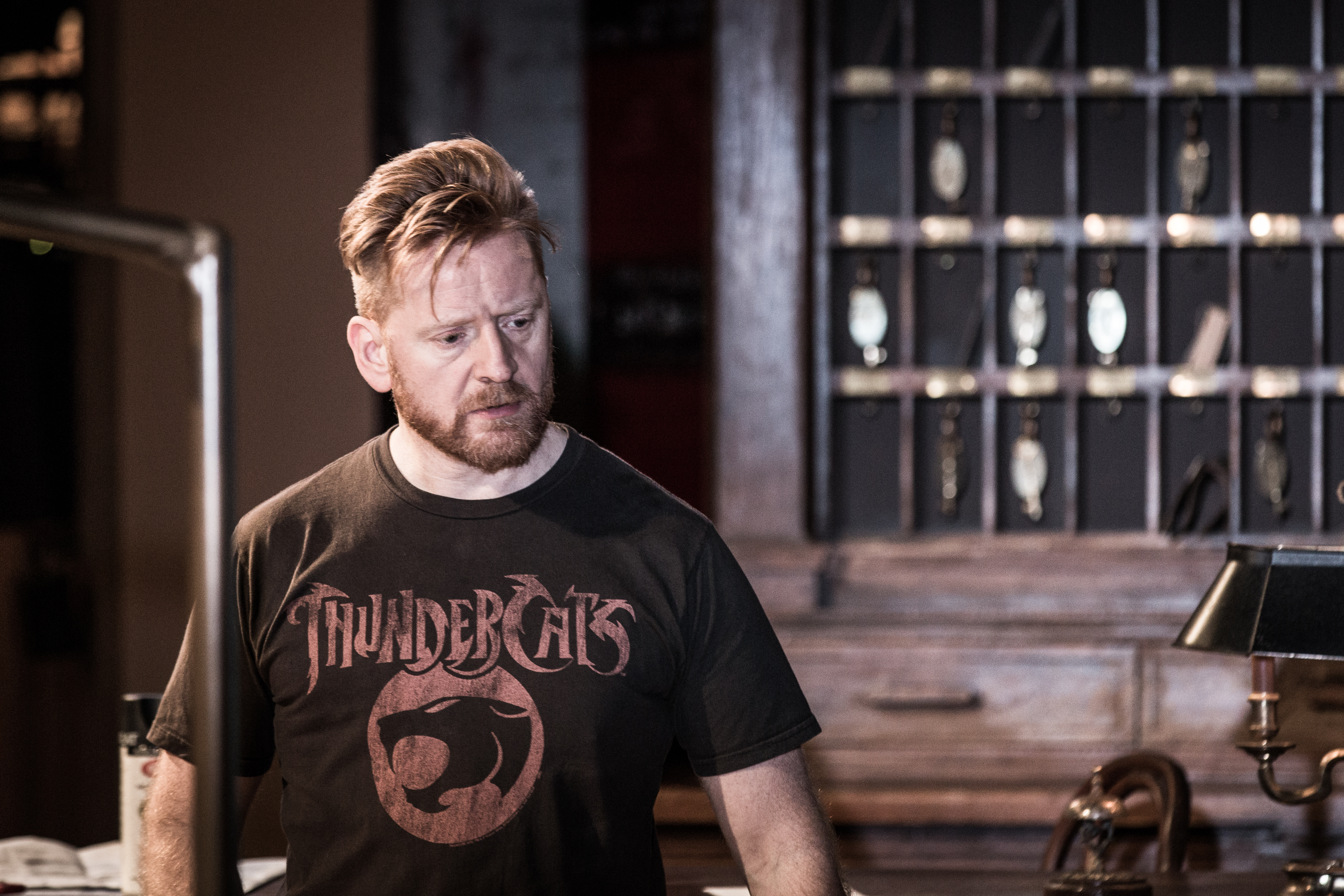
Christopher Oram, 2016

Christopher Oram is a British theatre set and costume designer.

== Background ==
He trained at the West Sussex College of Art and Design (latterly Northbrook College).

Early assisting work for designers Anthony Ward and Ian MacNeil, included Assassins at the Donmar Warehouse, Oliver! at the London Palladium and An Inspector Calls and Machinal at the National Theatre.

== Career ==
Having designed extensively on the fringe in London, he began a long term creative collaboration with the director Michael Grandage whom he met in 1995 when they first worked together on Arthur Miller's The Last Yankee in Colchester.

Their subsequent professional partnership at the Crucible Theatre, Sheffield, includes As You Like It with Victoria Hamilton (also Lyric Theatre, Hammersmith); A Midsummer Night's Dream and Richard III with Kenneth Branagh; Edward II with Joseph Fiennes; Suddenly Last Summer with Victoria Hamilton and Diana Rigg (also Albery Theatre); The Tempest with Derek Jacobi (also Old Vic) and Don Carlos with Derek Jacobi (also Gielgud Theatre).

Collaborations at the Donmar Warehouse include Good with Charles Dance; Passion Play, Privates on Parade with Roger Allam, Caligula with Michael Sheen; The Vortex; Merrily We Roll Along; Grand Hotel; Pirandello's Henry IV with Ian McDiarmid, Don Juan in Soho with Rhys Ifans, Frost/Nixon with Frank Langella and Michael Sheen (also West End and Broadway), Othello with Chiwetel Ejiofor and Ewan McGregor, Red with Alfred Molina and Eddie Redmayne (which subsequently transferred to the John Golden Theatre, Broadway) and King Lear with Derek Jacobi.

Oram designed the four plays of the Donmar Wyndham's season, Ivanov with Kenneth Branagh, Twelfth Night with Derek Jacobi, Madame de Sade with Judi Dench, and Hamlet with Jude Law (which subsequently transferred to Elsinore castle in Denmark, and to the Broadhurst Theatre, Broadway).

Oram also designed the musicals Guys and Dolls at the Piccadilly Theatre (also Princess Theatre, Melbourne) and Evita at the Adelphi Theatre in London, and on Broadway, as well as the costumes for Kenneth Branagh's film of The Magic Flute.

Other work includes Cat on a Hot Tin Roof (dir. Rob Ashford at the Richard Rodgers Theatre, Broadway), The 25th Annual Putnam County Spelling Bee (dir. Jamie Lloyd, Donmar Warehouse), Passion (dir. Jamie Lloyd, Donmar Warehouse), Parade (dir. Rob Ashford); A Streetcar Named Desire with Rachel Weisz (dir. Rob Ashford, Donmar Warehouse), A View from the Bridge with Ken Stott (dir. Lindsay Posner at the Duke of York's Theatre), King Lear and The Seagull with Ian McKellen (dir. Trevor Nunn, RSC Stratford, London and World Tour), Wolf Hall, Bring Up the Bodies and The Mirror and the Light (dir. Jeremy Herrin); Summerfolk, Stuff Happens, Power, Danton's Death and Man and Superman, (National Theatre), Lady Day at Emerson's Bar and Grill (Wyndham's Theatre), No's Knife (The Old Vic), Midnight in the Garden of Good and Evil (The Goodman Theatre, Chicago). Both Red and Parade played subsequent seasons at the Mark Taper Forum in Los Angeles.

Oram was also the season designer of the Michael Grandage Company inaugural season at the Noël Coward Theatre. Privates on Parade, Peter and Alice, The Cripple of Inishmaan, A Midsummer Night's Dream, and Henry V. Subsequent Michael Grandage Company productions Photograph 51 (Noël Coward Theatre), Backstairs Billy (Duke of Yorks Theatre), Lieutenant of Inishmore (Noël Coward Theatre) and The Line of Beauty (Almeida Theatre).

His opera work includes Billy Budd (Glyndebourne and BAM), The Marriage of Figaro (Glyndebourne), Don Giovanni (MET), Madama Butterfly (Houston Grand Opera), The Wreckers (Houston Grand Opera), The Turn of the Screw (Garsington Opera and Santa Fe Opera), La Traviata (Santa Fe Opera and Garsington Opera), Platee (Garsington Opera).

His ballet work includes Casanova by Kenneth Tindall (Northern Ballet), Geisha by Kenneth Tindall (Northern Ballet), Alice in Wonderland by Kenneth Tindall (Tulsa Ballet). Other dance work includes The Artist by Drew McConie (Theatre Royal Plymouth) and Quadrophenia by Paul Roberts (Sadler's Wells and tour).

In 2017/18 he designed set and costumes for Disney Theatrical Groups production of Frozen for its out of town production in Denver and its Broadway production opening at the St. James Theatre on 22 March 2018 and subsequently Theatre Royal Drury Lane in London, the U.S. tour, Australia, Japan, Germany and Holland.

Oram was an Artistic Associate on 'Plays at the Garrick' in the Kenneth Branagh season in the West End.

He is also a Companion of the Liverpool Institute for Performing Arts, and has been on the committee of the Linbury Prize for stage design.

== Awards ==
- 2004 Olivier Award - Best Costume (Power)
- 2004 Critics' Circle Award (Suddenly Last Summer)
- 2003 Evening Standard Award - Best Design (Caligula)
- 2010 Backstage Garland Award for Scenic Design (Parade)
- 2010 Critic's Circle Award (Red)
- 2010 Tony Award - Best Scenic Design of a Play (Red)
- 2010 LA Stage Alliance Ovation Award - Costume Design: Large Theatre (Parade)
- 2014 Falstaff Award - Best Costume Design (Henry V)
- 2015 Olivier Award - Best Costume (Wolf Hall and Bring Up the Bodies)
- 2015 Tony Award - Best Costume Design of a Play (Wolf Hall, parts 1 & 2)
- 2015 Falstaff Award - Best Costume Design (The Winter's Tale)
- 2016 Drama Desk Award - Outstanding Set Design for a Play (Hughie)
- 2019 Los Angeles Critics Circle Awards - Best Costume Design (Frozen)
- 2021 Whats on Stage Award - Best Set Design (Frozen)
- 2021 Whats on Stage Award - Best Costume Design (Frozen)
- 2024 Annual Equity Jeff Award - Best Set Design (Midnight in the Garden of Good and Evil)
