= 2018 WhatsOnStage Awards =

British theatre awards

The WhatsOnStage Awards, founded in 2001 as the Theatregoers' Choice Awards, are a fan-driven set of awards organised by the theatre website WhatsOnStage.com, based on a popular vote recognising performers and productions of English theatre, with an emphasis on London's West End theatre.

The 2018 Whatsonstage Awards winners and nominees were:

Best New Play	Best New Musical
The Ferryman; Gloria; Ink; Labour of Love; Oslo	Everybody's Talking About Jamie; Bat Out of Hell The Musical; Cilla the Musical; The Band; Young Frankenstein
Best Play Revival	Best Musical Revival
Hamlet; Angels in America; Don Juan in Soho; Who's Afraid of Virginia Woolf?; Witness for the Prosecution	42nd Street; Fiddler on the Roof; Five Guys Named Moe; Follies; Hair
Best Actor in a Play	Best Actress in a Play
David Tennant for Don Juan in Soho; Bryan Cranston for Network; Martin Freeman for Labour of Love; Andrew Garfield for Angels in America; Andrew Scott for Hamlet	Olivia Colman for Mosquitoes; Eve Best for Love In Idleness; Natalie Dormer for Venus in Fur; Tamsin Greig for Labour of Love; Imelda Staunton for Who's Afraid of Virginia Woolf?
Best Actor in a Musical	Best Actress in a Musical
John McCrea for Everybody's Talking About Jamie; Hadley Fraser for Young Frankenstein; Tom Lister for 42nd Street; Danny Mac for Sunset Boulevard; Andrew Polec for Bat Out of Hell	Carrie Hope Fletcher for The Addams Family; Christina Bennington for Bat Out of Hell; Janie Dee for Follies; Ria Jones for Sunset Boulevard; Josie Walker for Everybody's Talking About Jamie
Best Supporting Actor in a Play	Best Supporting Actress in a Play
Fra Fee for The Ferryman; Nathan Lane for Angels in America; Peter Polycarpou for Oslo; Adrian Scarborough for Don Juan in Soho; Nathan Stewart-Jarrett for Angels in America	Juliet Stevenson for Hamlet; Sheila Atim for Girl from the North Country; Jessica Brown Findlay for Hamlet; Denise Gough for Angels in America; Imogen Poots for Who's Afraid of Virginia Woolf?
Best Supporting Actor in a Musical	Best Supporting Actress in a Musical
Ross Noble for Young Frankenstein; Rob Fowler for Bat Out of Hell; Chris Howell for 42nd Street; Dex Lee for Five Guys Named Moe; George Sampson for Our House	Lucie Shorthouse for Everybody's Talking About Jamie; Tracie Bennett for Follies; Clare Halse for 42nd Street; Zoe Rainey for An American in Paris; Danielle Steers for Bat Out of Hell
Best Direction	Best Choreography
Sam Mendes for The Ferryman; Dominic Cooke for Follies; Marianne Elliot for Angels in America; Robert Icke for Hamlet; Jay Scheib for Bat Out of Hell	Randy Skinner for 42nd Street; Fabian Aloise for Our House; Drew McOnie for On the Town; Christopher Wheeldon for An American in Paris; Andrew Wright for Five Guys Named Moe
Best Set Design	Best Costume Design
Douglas W Schmidt for 42nd Street; Jon Bausor for Bat Out of Hell; Bunny Christie for Ink; Bob Crowley for An American in Paris; Vicki Mortimer for Follies	Roger Kirk for 42nd Street; Bob Crowley for An American in Paris; Gary McCann for La Cage aux Folles; Peter McKintosh for On the Town; Vicki Mortimer for Follies
Best Lighting Design	Best Video Design
Patrick Woodroffe for Bat Out of Hell; Paule Constable for Angels in America; Paule Constable for Follies; Natasha Katz for An American in Paris; Peter Mumford for 42nd Street	59 Productions for An American in Paris; Duncan McLean for Big Fish; Duncan McLean for Labour of Love; Tal Yarden for Hamlet; Tal Yarden for Network
Best Off-West End Production	Best Regional Production
Hair; La Ronde; The Wild Party; Working; Yank!	Sunset Boulevard; Our House; The Addams Family; The Band; The Hypocrite
Best Original Cast Recording	Best Show Poster
Les Misérables; Dear Evan Hansen; Dreamgirls; Girl from the North Country; Hamilton	Harry Potter and the Cursed Child; Cats; Hamilton; The Phantom of the Opera; Wicked
Best West End Show
Harry Potter and the Cursed Child; Kinky Boots; Les Misérables; The Phantom of the Opera; Wicked
Equity Award for Services to Theatre Society Special Award
Sonia Friedman
