= The Round Tower (film) =

British 1998 TV serial

- Genre: Drama
- Based on: The Round Tower by Catherine Cookson
- Written by: Trevor Bowen
- Directed by: Alan Grint
- Starring: Emilia Fox; Ben Miles; Jan Harvey
- Music by: Barrington Pheloung
- Country of origin: United Kingdom
- Original language: English
- No. of series: 1
- No. of episodes: 3

Production
- Producer: Ray Marshall
- Running time: 150 minutes (three episodes of 50 minutes)
- Production company: Festival Films for Tyne Tees Television

Original release
- Network: ITV
- Release: 9 January – 23 January 1998

The Round Tower is a British television serial of 1998, produced by Festival Films for Tyne Tees Television, directed by Alan Grint and based on the novel of the same name by Catherine Cookson.

== Plot outline ==
In Newcastle-on-Tyne in the 1950s, Vanessa Ratcliffe (Emilia Fox) the 17-year-old convent school daughter of prosperous parents, has an affair and reveals that she is pregnant, but will not name the father. Angus Cotton (Ben Miles), the son of the Ratcliffes' housekeeper, who works as a supervisor at an engineering works owned by Jonathan Ratcliffe (Keith Barron), Vanessa's father, is wrongly blamed but is willing to take the blame. This throws the two together and leads to an ultimately happy outcome for both, including success for Cotton in business.

== Film ==
- Screenplay: Trevor Bowen
- Music: Barrington Pheloung
- Producer: Keith Richardson, Ray Marshall
- Director: Alan Grint

== Cast ==
- Emilia Fox as Vanessa Ratcliffe
- Ben Miles as Angus Cotton
- Jan Harvey as Jane Ratcliffe
- Keith Barron as Jonathan Ratcliffe
- Jill Halfpenny as Rosie Cotton
- Isabelle Amyes as Irene Brett
- Christian Rodska as Dr Carr
- David Shelley as Brian Braintree
- Trevor Fox as Fred Singleton
- Catherine Terris as Emily Cotton
- Denis Lawson as Arthur Brett
- Emma Woollard as Susan Ratcliffe
- Martin Slav as Ray Ratcliffe
