= Shanay Holmes =

British actress, singer and producer

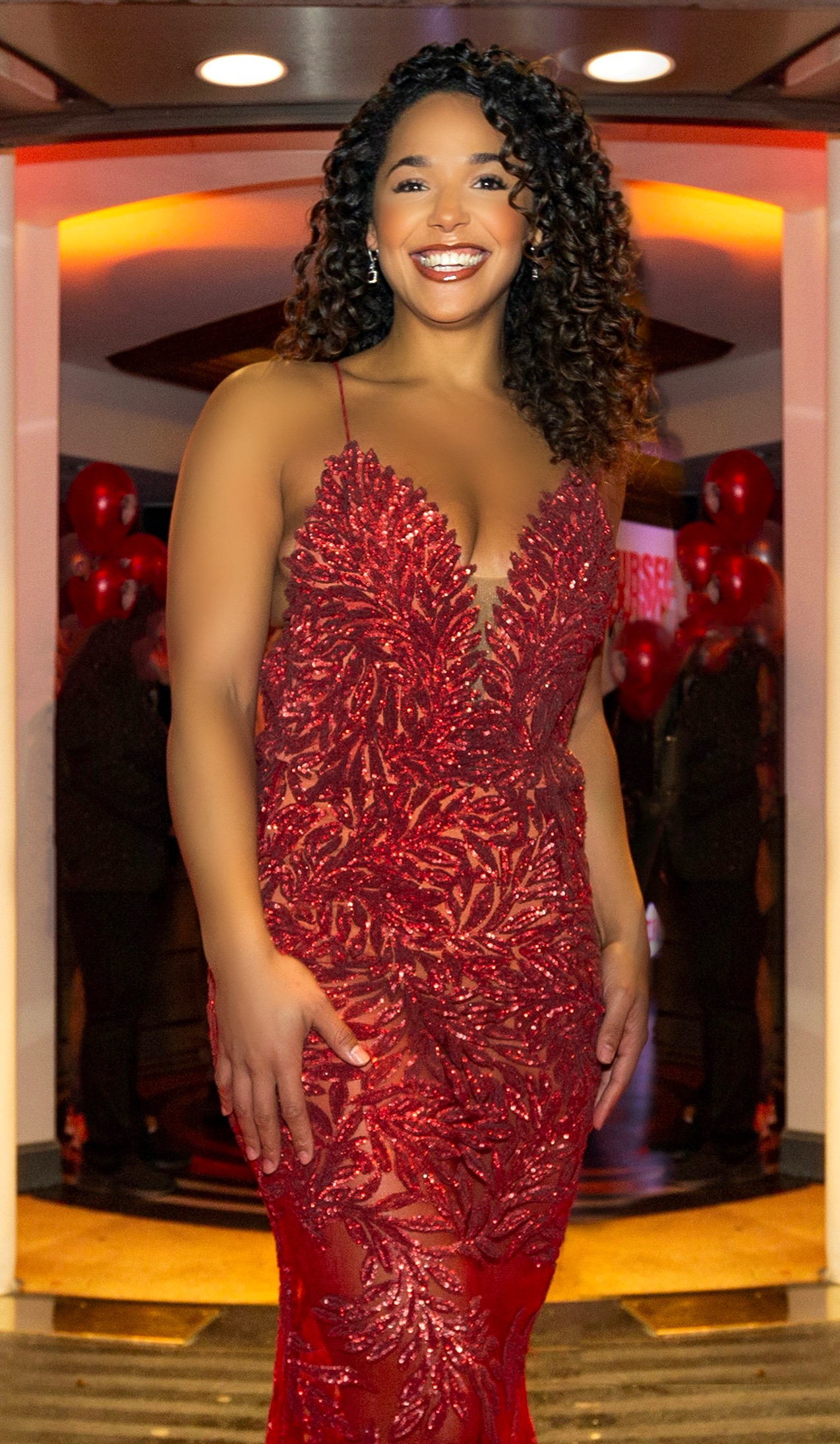
- Born: Shanay Patrice Holmes; 18 January 1989 (age 37); High Wycombe, England
- Years active: 2009–present
- Spouse: Chris Steward

Shanay Patrice Holmes (born 18 January 1989) is a British actor, singer and producer. She is best known for playing Nancy in Cameron Mackintosh' revival of Oliver!.

== Early life ==
Holmes was born in High Wycombe and grew up in Chalfont St Peter, Buckinghamshire. Holmes attended Amersham and Wycombe College. At age fourteen, she joined a youth choir called Young Voices. She landed her first West End role in Thriller – Live.

== Career ==
She played Cindy Breakspeare in 2021 in Get Up, Stand Up! The Bob Marley Musical, in which The Stage described hers as a "stand out performance". In 2023, Holmes played Ellen in Miss Saigon at Sheffield Theatres; The Times described her as "volcanic" in the part.

Holmes starred as Nancy in the 2024 revival of Oliver! at the Chichester Festival Theatre and continued in the role when Oliver! transferred to London's Gielgud Theatre. In its review of the West End engagement, the Financial Times wrote that she "shines as Nancy". The Stage praised her "sensual, heartbroken" portrayal and vocal power. Another notice commended her work in Oom-Pah-Pah and As Long as He Needs Me. Reviewing the production's Chichester run, The Times noted audience response to her performance.

=== Producing work ===
Holmes is a producer and co-founder of West End Musical Productions with her husband Chris Steward. The couple produce Musical Con among their musical theatre projects. In 2021 they won the Black British Theatre Award for Best Producer for their production "West End Musical Celebration at Palace Theatre". Musical Theatre Review described it as an “expertly created and executed showcase”. West End Musical Productions won the 2024 Michael Hastings, Baron Hastings of Scarisbrick award for outstanding work in the industry at the 2024 Black British Theatre Awards.

== Stage ==
Year	Title	Role	Notes
2009	Thriller – Live		Lyric Theatre, London
2014	The Bodyguard	Ensemble	Adelphi Theatre, London
2015	Close to You: Bacharach Reimagined		Criterion Theatre, London
2016	Jesus Christ Superstar	Ensemble	Regent's Park Open Air Theatre, London
2016	Rent	Joanne Jefferson	UK tour / The Other Palace, London
2018	Joseph and the Amazing Technicolour Dreamcoat	Narrator	Kilworth House, Leicestershire
2018	The Wizard of Oz	Glinda / Aunt Em	Birmingham Repertory Theatre, Birmingham
2019	The Bridges of Madison County	Marian	Menier Chocolate Factory, London
2019	High Fidelity	Laura	Turbine Theatre, London
2021	Get Up, Stand Up! The Bob Marley Musical	Cindy Breakspeare	Lyric Theatre, London
2023	Miss Saigon	Ellen	Crucible Theatre, Sheffield
2025	Oliver!	Nancy	Chichester Festival Theatre / Gielgud Theatre, London
2026	Fame	Miss Sherman	Theatre Royal, Plymouth

== Awards ==
- 2020 Black British Theatre Awards – Best Supporting Female Actor in a Musical
- 2021 Black British Theatre Awards – Best Producer for "West End Musical Celebration at Palace Theatre"
- 2022 Black British Theatre Awards – Best Producer West End Musical concert series'Femest
- 2024 Black British Theatre Awards – The Lord Hastings of Scarisbrick Award
- 2025 Black British Theatre Awards - Best Female Lead Actor In A Musical
