= Wolf Hall Parts One & Two =

2023 play adaptation by Mike Poulton

- Written by: Hilary Mantel (novels); Mike Poulton (play)
- Based on: Wolf Hall; Bring Up the Bodies
- Subject: the rise of Thomas Cromwell
- Setting: Sixteenth century England

Premiere
- Date: 11 December 2013
- Place: Swan Theatre, Stratford-upon-Avon

Wolf Hall Parts One & Two (originally titled Wolf Hall & Bring Up The Bodies) is a two-part play based on Hilary Mantel's novels Wolf Hall (2009) and Bring Up the Bodies (2013), adapted for the stage by Mike Poulton. Set in the period from 1500 to 1535, Wolf Hall is a sympathetic fictionalised biography documenting the rapid rise to power of Thomas Cromwell in the court of Henry VIII through to the death of Sir Thomas More.

== Production history ==
=== Stratford-upon-Avon and West End (2013-14) ===
In January 2013, the Royal Shakespeare Company (RSC) announced that it would stage adaptations by Mike Poulton of Wolf Hall and Bring Up the Bodies in its Winter season in the Swan Theatre, Stratford-upon-Avon beginning previews from 11 December 2013, with press performances on 8 January 2014, running until 29 March. The production transferred to London's Aldwych Theatre from 1 May 2014, for a limited run until 4 October (extended from 6 September due to popular demand).

=== Broadway (2015) ===
Producers Jeffrey Richards and Jerry Frankel brought the London productions of Wolf Hall and Bring Up the Bodies, starring Ben Miles as Thomas Cromwell, Lydia Leonard as Anne Boleyn, Lucy Briers as Katherine of Aragon, and Nathaniel Parker as Henry VIII, to Broadway's Winter Garden Theatre beginning previews from 20 March with an opening night on 9 April 2015, for a 15-week run until 5 July. The double-bill was re-titled Wolf Hall Parts One & Two for American audiences. The play was nominated for 8 Tony Awards, including Best Play.

== Characters and original cast ==
Character	Royal Shakespeare Company (2013)	West End (2014)	Broadway (2015)
Mark Smeaton	Joey Batey	Joey Batey	Joey Batey
Charles Brandon	Nicholas Boulton	Nicholas Boulton	Nicholas Boulton
Katherine of Aragon Jane Boleyn	Lucy Briers	Lucy Briers	Lucy Briers
Princess Mary Jane Seymour Lady Worcester	Leah Brotherhead	Leah Brotherhead	Leah Brotherhead
Lizzie Wykys Mary Boleyn Mary Shelton	Olivia Darnley	Olivia Darnley	Olivia Darnley
Thomas Howard	Nicholas Day	Nicholas Day	Nicholas Day
Gregory Cromwell	Daniel Fraser	Daniel Fraser	Daniel Fraser
George Boleyn Edward Seymour	Oscar Pearce	Oscar Pearce	Edward Harrison
Margery Seymour Lady-in-waiting Maid	Madeleine Hyland	Madeleine Hyland	Madeleine Hyland
Sir John Seymour Thomas Wolsey Archbishop Warham Sir William Kingston	Paul Jesson	Paul Jesson	Paul Jesson
Anne Boleyn	Lydia Leonard	Lydia Leonard	Lydia Leonard
Thomas Cromwell	Ben Miles	Ben Miles	Ben Miles
Christophe Francis Weston	Pierro Niel-Mee	Pierro Niel-Mee	Pierro Niel-Mee
King Henry VIII	Nathaniel Parker	Nathaniel Parker	Nathaniel Parker
Stephen Gardiner Eustache Chapuys	Matthew Pidgeon	Matthew Pidgeon	Matthew Pidgeon
Henry Norris Thomas More	John Ramm	John Ramm	John Ramm
Harry Percy William Brereton	Nicholas Shaw	Nicholas Shaw	Nicholas Shaw
Rafe Sadler	Alexander Cobb	Joshua Silver	Joshua Silver
Thomas Boleyn Thomas Cranmer French Ambassador	Giles Taylor	Giles Taylor	Giles Taylor
Thomas Wyatt Headsman	Jay Taylor	Jay Taylor	Jay Taylor
Wolsey's Servant Servant Barge-Master	—N/a	—N/a	Benedict Hastings

== Awards and nominations ==
=== Original London production ===
Year	Award Ceremony	Category	Nominee	Result
2014	Evening Standard Theatre Awards			
2014	Evening Standard Theatre Awards	Best Director	Jeremy Herrin	Won
2014	Evening Standard Theatre Awards	Best Actor	Ben Miles	Nominated
2015	WhatsOnStage Awards	Best New Play		Nominated
2015	WhatsOnStage Awards	Best Supporting Actor in a Play	Nathaniel Parker	Nominated
2015	Laurence Olivier Awards	Best New Play		Nominated
2015	Laurence Olivier Awards	Best Director	Jeremy Herrin	Nominated
2015	Laurence Olivier Awards	Best Actor in a Supporting Role	Nathaniel Parker	Won
2015	Laurence Olivier Awards	Best Costume Design	Christopher Oram	Won
2015	Laurence Olivier Awards	Best Lighting Design	Paule Constable and David Plater	Nominated

=== Original Broadway production ===
Year	Award	Category	Nominee	Result
2015	Tony Awards	Best Play		Nominated
2015	Tony Awards	Best Actor in a Play	Ben Miles	Nominated
2015	Tony Awards	Best Featured Actor in a Play	Nathaniel Parker	Nominated
2015	Tony Awards	Best Featured Actress in a Play	Lydia Leonard	Nominated
2015	Tony Awards	Best Direction of a Play	Jeremy Herrin	Nominated
2015	Tony Awards	Best Scenic Design in a Play	Christopher Oram	Nominated
2015	Tony Awards	Best Costume Design in a Play	Christopher Oram	Won
2015	Tony Awards	Best Lighting Design in a Play	Paule Constable and David Plater	Nominated
2015	Drama Desk Awards	Outstanding Actor in a Play	Ben Miles	Nominated
2015	Drama Desk Awards	Outstanding Featured Actress in a Play	Lydia Leonard	Nominated
2015	Drama Desk Awards	Outstanding Director of a Play	Jeremy Herrin	Nominated
2015	Drama Desk Awards	Outstanding Costume Design for a Play	Christopher Oram	Nominated
2015	Drama Desk Awards	Outstanding Lighting Design for a Play	Paule Constable and David Plater	Nominated
2015	Outer Critics Circle Awards	Outstanding New Broadway Play		Nominated
2015	Outer Critics Circle Awards	Outstanding Actor in a Play	Ben Miles	Nominated
2015	Outer Critics Circle Awards	Outstanding Featured Actor in a Play	Paul Jesson	Nominated
2015	Outer Critics Circle Awards	Outstanding Featured Actor in a Play	Nathaniel Parker	Nominated
2015	Outer Critics Circle Awards	Outstanding Featured Actress in a Play	Lydia Leonard	Nominated
2015	Outer Critics Circle Awards	Outstanding Director of a Play	Jeremy Herrin	Nominated
2015	Outer Critics Circle Awards	Outstanding Costume Design (Play or Musical)	Christopher Oram	Nominated
2015	Drama League Awards	Outstanding Production of a Broadway or Off-Broadway Play		Nominated
2015	Drama League Awards	Distinguished Performance Award	Ben Miles	Nominated
2015	Drama League Awards	Distinguished Performance Award	Nathaniel Parker	Nominated

== See also ==
- Cultural depictions of Henry VIII
- The Mirror and the Light – 2021 stage adaptation of the final part of Mantel's trilogy, adapted by Mantel and Ben Miles.
