= 2024 Black British Theatre Awards =

Theatrical awards ceremony that took place in 2024

The Black British Theatre Awards (BBTA) were launched in 2019 and recognise excellence among black performers and creatives in the UK.

The 2024 Black British Theatre Awards winners and nominees were:

Best Play	Best Musical
Choir Boy at Bristol Old Vic; Ain't I A Woman? at The Tower Theatre; Swim, Aunty, Swim! at the Belgrade Theatre	MJ The Musical at the Prince Edward Theatre; Jamaica Love, UK Tour; TINA - The Tina Turner Musical at the Aldwych Theatre
Best Male Actor in a Play	Best Male Actor in a Musical
Terique Jarrett for Choir Boy at Bristol Old Vic; Christopher Mbaki for Before I Go at Brixton House; Neil Reidman for Without at The Omnibus Theatre Courtyard Theatre	Ivano Turco for Everybody's Talking About Jamie, UK Tour; Layton Williams for Cabaret at The Kit Kat Club; Owen Chaponda for The Lion King at the Lyceum Theatre
Best Female Actor in a Play	Best Female Actor in a Musical
Tiwa Lade for My Father's Fable at the Bush Theatre; Ellena Vincent for The Book of Grace at the Arcola Theatre; Francesca Amewudah-Rivers for Romeo & Juliet at the Duke of York's Theatre	Karis Anderson for TINA - The Tina Turner Musical at the Aldwych Theatre; Jenny Fitzpatrick for Oliver! at Leeds Playhouse; Rhianne-Louise McCaulsky for Cruel Intentions:The ‘90s Musical at The Other Palace
Best Supporting Male Actor in a Play	Best Supporting Male Actor in a Musical
Joshua-Alexander Williams for Romeo & Juliet at the Duke of York's Theatre; Branden Cook for Skeleton Crew at the Donmar Warehouse; Frank Skully for Kiss, Marry, Kill, Dante or Die - UK Tour	Marley Fenton for The Wizard of Oz, UK Tour; Ashley Campbell for Just for One Day at The Old Vic; Michael Ahomka-Lindsay for Cabaret at The Kit Kat Club
Best Supporting Female Actor in a Play	Best Supporting Female Actor in a Musical
Freema Agyeman for Romeo & Juliet at The Duke of York's Theatre; Adele James for Underdog: The Other Other Brontë at the National Theatre; Mia Jerome for Romeo & Juliet at The Duke of York's Theatre	Elèna Gyasi for Mean Girls at the Savoy Theatre; Phebe Edwards for MJ The Musical at the Prince Edward Theatre; Raphaella Philbert for The Lion King at the Lyceum Theatre
Best Non Binary Performer	
Claudia Kariuki; Phoebe Campbell; Sam Crerar	

Creatives Awards
Best Director	Best Producer
Nancy Medina for Choir Boy at Bristol Old Vic; Dermot Daly for Bullring Techno Makeout Jamz at the Royal Court Theatre; Landé Belo for Ain't I A Woman? at the Tower Theatre	Landé Belo for Ain't I A Woman? at the Tower Theatre; Chuchu Nwagu for Red Pitch at @sohoplace; Jade Samuels for The Architect, Actors Touring Company/Greenwich Docklands International Festival
Best Choreographer or Movement Director	Best Dance Production or Performance
Mthuthuzeli November for The Waiting Game, Ballet Black; Christopher Tendai for Closer To Heaven at the Turbine Theatre; Lanre Malaolu for Now, I See at Stratford East Theatre	Ebony Thomas for The Waiting Game, Ballet Black; Cycles for Boy Blue at the Barbican Theatre; Monique Jonas for Romeo and Juliet at Sadler's Wells Theatre
Best Musical Director	
Sean Green for MJ The Musical at the Prince Edward Theatre; CeCelia Wickham-Anderson for Jamaica Love at Trafalgar Theatre & Tour; Hannah Ledwidge for No More Mr Nice Guy at Birmingham Rep

Recognition Awards
Lighting Design Recognition Award	Sound Design Recognition Award
Ryan Day; Joshie Harriette; Simisola Majekodunmi	Xana; Khalil Madovi; Tony Gayle
Theatre Design Recognition Award	Playwright Recognition Award
Jessica Cabassa; Debbie Duru; Georgia Wilmot	Siana Bangura; Lucie Lutte; Tobi King Bakare
Book and Lyrics Recognition Award	Casting Director Recognition Award
Lady Lykez; Anoushka Lucas; DK Fashola	Selma Nicholls; Heather Basten; Isabella Odoffin

Champion Awards
LGBTQ+ Champion Award	Disability Champion Award
Layton Williams; Ivano Turco	Linseigh Green; Chris Fonseca; Matilda Feyiṣayọ Ibini
Best Child Performer (Under 16)	
Janai Bartlett for TINA - The Tina Turner Musical at the Aldwych Theatre; Dylan Trigger for MJ the Musical at the Prince Edward Theatre; Mia-Nicole Alexander for The Lion King at the Lyceum Theatre	

Achievement Awards
Best Teacher Award	Best Graduate Award
Dannika Dudfield, Soar Performance Academy; Kamara Gray, Artistry Youth Dance; Nadine Kennedy Wood, NDC College	Kwamé Kandekore for MJ The Musical, Emil Dale Academy; Joshua Alexander-Williams for Romeo & Juliet, ArtsEd; Sedona Sky for Heathers: The Musical, ArtsEd
Lifetime Achievement	The Lord Hastings of Scarisbrick Award
Namron OBE	Shanay Holmes and Chris Steward, West End Musical Productions
Founders Choice Award	
Danny Sapani for King Lear at the Almeida Theatre	

== See also ==
- Laurence Olivier Awards
- WhatsOnStage Awards
- Evening Standard Theatre Awards
- Tony Awards
- Drama Desk Awards
