= 2019 Black British Theatre Awards =

The Black British Theatre Awards (BBTA) were launched in 2019 and recognise excellence among Black performers and creatives in the UK.

The 2019 Black British Theatre Awards winners and nominees were:

Recognition Group Awards
Light and Sound Recognition Award	Set Design Recognition Award
Tony Gayle	Sadeysa Greenaway-Bailey
Book and Lyrics Recognition Award	Musical Director Recognition Award
Debbie Tucker Green; Arinze Kene; Inua Ellams	Benjamin Kwasi Burrell; Michael Henry; Sean Green

Creatives Group Awards
Best Director	Best Producer
Lynette Linton for Sweat; Roy Alexander Weise for Nine Night; Nancy Medina for The Half God of Rainfall	Tobi Kyeremateng, Babylon Festival, Bush Theatre
Best Choreographer	Best Opera Production
Shelley Maxwell for Equus; Alesandra Seutin for Reckoning; Rachael Nanyonjo for Sleeping Beauty	Porgy and Bess, ENO at the London Coliseum
Best Dance Performance	Best Dance Production
Prentice Whitlow in The Rite of Spring; Carlos Acosta in Don Quixote; Precious Adams in Manon	The Rite of Spring at the Sadler's Wells; The Suit/Dream Within a Midsummer Nights Dream; Sylvia, ZooNation

Plays Awards
Best Male Actor in a Play	Best Female Actor in a Play
Arinzé Kene in Misty; Kwami Odoom in The Half God of Rainfall; Aaron Pierre in King Hedley II	Gloria Williams in Bullet Hole; Rakie Ayola in The Half God of Rainfall; Sharon D Clarke in Death of a Salesman
Best Supporting Male Actor in a Play	Best Supporting Female Actor in a Play
Lenny Henry in King Hedley II; Osy Ikhile in Sweat; Sule Rimi in All My Sons	Michelle Greenidge in Nine Night; Cherrelle Skeete in King Hedley II; Martine Laird in King Hedley II
Best Production of a Play	
The Half God of Rainfall; The Small Island; Nine Night	

Musicals Awards
Best Male Actor in a Musical	Best Female Actor in a Musical
Layton Williams in Everybody's Talking About; Jamie: Jay Perry in Motown: the Musical; Kobna Holdbrook-Smith in Tina - The Tina Turner Musical	Sharon D Clarke in Caroline, Or Change; Rachel John in Hamilton; Maiya Quansah-Breed in Six
Best Supporting Male Actor in a Musical	Best Supporting Female Actor in a Musical
Cavin Cornwall in Jesus Christ Superstar; Jason Pennycooke in Hamilton; Arun Blair-Mangat in Leave to Remain	Beverley Knight in Sylvia; Amara Okereke in Les Misérables; Kelly Agbowu in Waitress; Madeline Appiah in Tina - The Tina Turner Musical
Best Musical Production	
Hamilton; Tina - The Tina Turner Musical; Motown: the Musical	

Achievement Awards
Best Teacher of Performing Arts as a Subject	Best Recent Graduate Award
Angeline Bell, Urdang Academy; Dollie Henry, Trinity Laban Conservatoire of Music and Dance	Amara Okereke, ArtsEd; Maiya Quansah-Breed, Guildford School of Acting

- Lifetime Recognition Award - Sharon D Clarke

== See also ==
- Laurence Olivier Awards
- WhatsOnStage Awards
- Evening Standard Theatre Awards
- Tony Awards
- Drama Desk Awards
