= Terique Jarrett =

English actor (born 1996)

- Born: 5 August 1996 (age 30); Enfield, London, England
- Years active: 2015–present

Terique Neville C. Jarrett (born 5 August 1996) is an English actor. He is known for his work in theatre, earning an Evening Standard Theatre Award nomination, as well as his role in the tween dance series Find Me in Paris (2019–2020).

== Early life ==
Jarrett was born in the North London Borough of Enfield. He is of Jamaican descent. His parents enrolled him in weekend acting classes when he was young. He trained at Colin's Performing Arts (CPA) Studios in Romford and the Laura Marie Theatre Academy in Upminster.

== Career ==
Jarrett made his West End debut in the ensemble of Motown: The Musical. He made his onscreen debut in 2019 when he joined the main cast of the tween time travel dance series Find Me in Paris for its second and third season as new ballet student Isaac Portier. That same year, he appeared in The Winter's Tale at the National Theatre and Our Town at Regent's Park Open Air Theatre.

In 2020, Jarrett originated the role of Gregory Cromwell in the stage adaptation of Hilary Mantel's The Mirror and the Light at the Gielgud Theatre, charting the fall of Thomas Cromwell following Anne Boleyn's execution. He received critical acclaim for his performance as Franklin in Jeremy O. Harris' play Daddy: A Melodrama opposite Claes Bang at the Almeida Theatre, and nominations for Evening Standard and Black British Theatre Awards. This was followed by a lead role as Pharus Jonathan Young in Tarell Alvin McCraney's Choir Boy at Bristol Old Vic, for which he won a Black British Theatre Award.

Jarrett made his feature film debut in Amrou Al-Khadi's Layla, which opened at the 2024 Sundance Film Festival. He appeared in the UK premiere of the musical Fangirls at the Lyric Hammersmith.

== Filmography ==
Year	Title	Role	Notes
2019–2020	Find Me in Paris	Isaac Portier	Main role (seasons 2–3)
2021	Terminus (or How Dr Clark Almost Saved the World)	Hamlet	Short film
2021	"The Vision They Had"		Composition from The Windrush Suite
2022	Moon Knight	Employee	Episode: "Summon the Suit"
2024	Layla	Felix	
2024	Wolf	Brian	Short film
TBA	Untitled series	Lieutenant Poyle	

== Stage ==
Year	Title	Role	Notes
2015	Aladdin	PC Ping	Carriageworks Theatre, Leeds
2016	Mother Goose	Chorus	Wilton's Music Hall, London
2017	Motown: The Musical	Ensemble	Shaftesbury Theatre, London
2019	The Winter's Tale	Polixenes	Royal National Theatre, London
2019	Our Town	Si / Joe Crowell	Regent's Park Open Air Theatre, London
2021	The Mirror and the Light	Gregory Cromwell	Gielgud Theatre, London
2022	Daddy: A Melodrama	Franklin	Almeida Theatre, London
2023	Choir Boy	Pharus Jonathan Young	Bristol Old Vic, Bristol
2024	Fangirls	Salty	Lyric Theatre, Hammersmith
2025	Juniper Blood	Femi	Donmar Warehouse, London
2026	A Midsummer Night's Dream	Demetrius	Regent's Park Open Air Theatre, London

== Awards and nominations ==
Year	Award	Category	Work	Result	Ref.
2022	Black British Theatre Awards	Best Male Actor in a Play	Daddy: A Melodrama	Nominated	
2022	Evening Standard Theatre Awards	Emerging Talent	Daddy: A Melodrama	Nominated	
2024	Black British Theatre Awards	Best Male Lead Actor in a Play	Choir Boy	Won	
