= 2021 Black British Theatre Awards =

Theatre awards ceremony that took place in 2021

The Black British Theatre Awards (BBTA) were launched in 2019 and recognise excellence among black performers and creatives in the UK.

The 2021 Black British Theatre Awards winners and nominees were:

Creatives Group Awards
Best Director for a Play or Musical	Best Producer
Miranda Cromwell for and breathe...; Anthony Simpson-Pike for Lava; Tinuke Craig for The Color Purple – at Home	Chris Steward and Shanay Holmes for West End Musical Celebration at Palace Theatre; Almeida Theatre for and breathe...; Tanisha Spring for A Killer Party
Best Choreographer	Best Musical Director
Ingrid Mackinnon for Romeo and Juliet; Dannielle ‘Rhimes’ Lecointe for The Sun, The Moon and The Stars; Sarah Golding for Cruise	Femi Temowo for and breathe...; Ian Oakley for From Here; Nadine Lee for Bagdad Cafe
Best Dance Performance in a Dance Production	Best Dance Production
Joseph Sissens for The Statement (The Royal Ballet)	‘And Still We Dance!’, Afro Dance Xplosion; Far From the Norm, BLKDOG; Like Water, Ballet Black
Best Use of Innovation and Technology	
Ryan Carter for The Secret Society of Leading Ladies; Chris Steward and Shanay Holmes for West End Musical Celebration at Palace Theatre	

Plays Awards
Best Male Actor in a Play	Best Female Actor in a Play
David Jonsson in and breathe... at the Almeida Theatre; Michael Balogun in Death of England at the National Theatre; Omari Douglas in Constellations at the Vaudeville Theatre	Isabel Adomakoh Young in Romeo and Juliet at Regent's Park Open Air Theatre; Ronkẹ Adékoluẹjo in Lava at the Bush Theatre; Tia Bannon in seven methods of killing kylie jenner at the Royal Court Theatre
Best Supporting Male Actor in a Play	Best Supporting Female Actor in a Play
Andrew French in Romeo and Juliet at Regent's Park Open Air Theatre; Ola Ayofe in After Life at the National Theatre; Stephen K Amos in My Night With Reg at the Turbine Theatre	Aretha Ayeh in Romeo and Juliet at Regent's Park Open Air Theatre; Anoushka Lucas in After Life at the National Theatre; Rosalind Eleazar in Uncle Vanya at the Harold Pinter Theatre
Best Production of a Play	
and breathe... at the Almeida Theatre; J’Ouvert at the Harold Pinter Theatre; Lava at the Bush Theatre

Musicals Awards
Best Male Actor in a Musical	Best Female Actor in a Musical
Ivano Turco in Andrew Lloyd Webber’s Cinderella at the Gillian Lynne Theatre; Liam Tamne in The Prince Of Egypt at the Dominion Theatre; Tyrone Huntley in Jesus Christ Superstar at Regent's Park Open Air Theatre	Lucy St. Louis in The Phantom of the Opera at Her Majesty's Theatre; Marisha Wallace in Hairspray at the London Coliseum; Shanay Holmes in Disenchanted
Best Supporting Male Actor in a Musical	Best Supporting Female Actor in a Musical
Caleb Roberts in Andrew Lloyd Webber's Cinderella at the Gillian Lynne Theatre; Ashley Samuels in Hairspray at the London Coliseum; John Pfumojena in Carousel at Regent's Park Open Air Theatre	Natasha May-Thomas in Carousel at Regent's Park Open Air Theatre; Gloria Onitiri in Andrew Lloyd Webber’s Cinderella at the Gillian Lynne Theatre; Tanisha Spring in The Prince Of Egypt at the Dominion Theatre
Best Musical Production	
West End Musical Celebration at the Palace Theatre; The Color Purple – at Home at the Curve, in association with Birmingham Hippodrome; The Last Five Years at the Minack Theatre	

Recognition Group Awards
Light and Sound Recognition Award	Costume Design Recognition Award
Tony Gayle	Jodie-Simone Howe
Book and Lyrics Recognition Award	Musical Director Recognition Award
Benedict Lombe; Annabel Mutale Reed; Yomi Sode	Ian Oakley; Sean Green
Casting Director Recognition Award	
Chandra Ruegg; Isabella Odoffin	

Achievement Awards
Best Teacher of Performing Arts as a Subject	Best Recent Graduate Award
Ashley Campbell from the British Theatre Academy; Hakeem Onibudo from Impact Dance; Kamara Gray from Artistry Youth Dance	Natasha May-Thomas, Urdang Academy; Georgina Onuorah, Arts Educational Schools; Kayla Carter, Royal Academy of Music
LGBTQ+ Champion	Lifetime Achievement
Jay Perry; Alex Thomas-Smith; Nicole Raquel Dennis	Derek Griffiths MBE

== See also ==
- Laurence Olivier Awards
- WhatsOnStage Awards
- Evening Standard Theatre Awards
- Tony Awards
- Drama Desk Awards
