= 2025 Black British Theatre Awards =

The Black British Theatre Awards (BBTA) were launched in 2019 and recognise excellence among black performers and creatives in the UK.

The 2025 Black British Theatre Awards winners and nominees were:

Best Production - Play	Best Musical
Shifters, Duke of York’s Theatre; Alterations, National Theatre; Pig Heart Boy, Unicorn Theatre and on tour	The Lion King, Lyceum Theatre; MJ the Musical, Prince Edward Theatre; TINA - The Tina Turner Musical at the Aldwych Theatre
Best Male Lead Actor in a Play	Best Male Lead Actor in a Musical
Arinzé Kene for Alterations at the National Theatre; Kyle Ndukuba for Romeo and Juliet at the Belgrade Theatre; Omari Douglas for This Bitter Earth at the Soho Theatre	Jay Perry for Hamilton at the Victoria Palace Theatre; Jeevan Braich for Starlight Express at the Troubadour Wembley Park Theatre; Newtion Matthews for Kinky Boots, UK and Ireland tour
Best Female Lead Actor in a Play	Best Female Lead Actor in a Musical
Beverley Knight for Marie and Rosetta, The Rose Theatre; Anne Odeke for Princess Essex at the Shakespeare’s Globe; Suzanne Packer for The Women of Llanrumney, Stratford East	Shanay Holmes for Oliver! at the Gielgud Theatre; Georgina Onuorah for Shucked at Regent’s Park Open Air Theatre; Natalie Kassanga for Moulin Rouge! The Musical at the Piccadilly Theatre
Best Supporting Male Actor in a Play	Best Supporting Male Actor in a Musical
Emmanuel Akwafo for A Midsummer Night’s Dream at the Bridge Theatre; Andre Antonio for Romeo and Juliet at the Belgrade Theatre; Tyreke Leslie for Princess Essex at the Shakespeare’s Globe	Cedric Neal for Hadestown, at the Lyric Theatre; CJ Borger for Back To The Future: The Musical, Adelphi Theatre; Ryan Carter for Bat Out of Hell: The Musical, UK tour
Best Supporting Female Actor in a Play	Best Supporting Female Actor in a Musical
Cash Holland for A Raisin in the Sun at the Lyric Hammersmith; Miranda Mufema for Stranger Things: The First Shadow at the Phoenix Theatre; Nicola Hughes for Intimate Apparel at the Donmar Warehouse	Jade Marvin for Starlight Express at the Troubadour Wembley Park Theatre; Georgia Bradshaw, for Bat Out of Hell: The Musical, UK tour; Georgia Gillam for Tina: The Tina Turner Musical, UK and Ireland tour
Best Child Performer (Under 16)	LGBTQIA+ Champion
Keilah Kofi for The Lion King, Lyceum Theatre; Chizaram Ochuba-Okafor for Tina: The Tina Turner Musical, UK and Ireland tour; Riley-Ann Nicholls Murphy for Our Mighty Groove, Sadler’s Wells East	Newtion Matthews; Johannes Radebe; Layton Williams
Creatives Awards
Best Director	Best Producer
Lynette Linton for Intimate Apparel, Donmar Warehouse; Prime Isaac for Bitch Boxer, Watford Palace Theatre; Robin Belfield for Princess Essex, Shakespeare’s Globe	Chuchu Nwagu; Mwansa Phiri
Best Choreographer or Movement Director	Best Dance Production or Performer
Ingrid Mackinnon for Princess Essex, Shakespeare’s Globe; Christopher Tendai for Cake: The Marie Antoinette Musical, The Other Palace; Shelley Maxwell for Alterations, National Theatre	Our Mighty Groove, Sadler’s Wells East and Uchenna Dance; Ballet Black: Shadows at Hackney Empire; Inside Giovanni’s Room, Phoenix Dance Theatre – Sadler’s Wells East
Best Musical Director	
Takisha Sargent for The Women of Llanrumney, Stratford East; Ashton Moore, Play On!, UK tour; Xana, Alterations, National Theatre	
Best Sound and/or Lighting Design	Best Theatre Design
Eamonn O’Dwyer; Joshua Harriette; Warren “Flamin Beatz” Morgan-Humphreys	Georgie Lynch; Bolu Dairo; Stella-Jane Odoemelam
Best Books and Lyrics	Best Playwright
Trish Cooke; Winsome Pinnock FRSL	Anne Odeke; Coral Wylie; Ntombizodwa Nyoni
Best Casting Director	Lifetime Achievement
Heather Basten; Selma Nicholls	Nicola Blackman
Best Teacher	The Lord Hastings of Scarisbrick Award
Stewart Avon-Arnold, Studio 59; Claudimar Neto, Insight Dance Company; Kamara Gray, Artistry Youth Dance	Liam Godwin

== See also ==
- Laurence Olivier Awards
- WhatsOnStage Awards
- Evening Standard Theatre Awards
- Tony Awards
- Drama Desk Awards
