= Labour of Love (play) =

2017 play by James Graham

- Written by: James Graham
- Original language: English
- Subject: Politics
- Genre: Comedy
- Setting: Kirkby-in-Ashfield, Nottinghamshire, England

Premiere
- Place premiered: Noël Coward Theatre

Labour of Love is a 2017 play by James Graham. It tells the story of a Labour MP over 25 years in office in Kirkby-In-Ashfield, Nottinghamshire, England. The full cast included Martin Freeman as David Lyons, Tamsin Greig as Jean Whittaker, Rachael Stirling as Elizabeth Lyons, Kwong Loke as Mr Shen, Dickon Tyrrell as Len Prior and Susie Wokoma as Margot Midler.

== Production history ==
Directed by Jeremy Herrin, the play began previews at the Noël Coward Theatre on 27 September 2017, with an official opening night on 2 October. It concluded its limited run on 2 December 2017. The opening was delayed by a week due to Sarah Lancashire dropping out of the production on doctors' advice, with Tamsin Greig replacing her.
