= Festival Film & TV =

Festival Film & TV is an independent UK based production company founded in 1992 by award-winning producer Ray Marshall. The company is best known for producing The Cookson Dramas for ITV. Between 1992 and 2000, Festival produced 15 mini-series, based on books by bestselling novelist Catherine Cookson.

The Cookson Dramas became one of ITV's major brands, regularly bringing in audiences over 12 million and attracting the cream of Britain's acting talent, including Catherine Zeta-Jones, Sean Bean, Robson Green, Ray Stevenson, Emilia Fox, Nigel Havers, Samantha Bond, Denholm Elliott, Emily Mortimer, and Bob Peck.

FESTIVAL FILMS, Festival's feature film arm is involved in the development and production of feature films.

== Credits ==
Half Broken Things - TV Movie (2007)

Man Dancin' (2004)

A Dinner Of Herbs - TV mini-series, 6 episodes (2000)

The Secret - TV movie (2000)

Tilly Trotter - TV series (1999)

Colour Blind - TV mini-series, 2 episodes (1998)

The Round Tower - TV movie (1998)

The Rag Nymph - TV mini-series (1997)

The Moth - TV movie (1997)

The Wingless Bird - TV series (1997)

The Gambling Man - TV series (1996)

The Glass Virgin - TV mini-series (1996)

The Girl - TV Movie (1995)

The Tide Of Life - TV mini series (1995)

The Cinder Path - TV series (1994)

The Dwelling Place - TV series (1994)

The Man Who Cried - TV movie (1993)

Get the Picture - Children's TV quiz show, 65 episodes (1993)
