= Don Juan in Soho =

2006 play by Patrick Marber

Don Juan in Soho is a play by the British playwright Patrick Marber after Molière (see Dom Juan).

== Production history ==
=== Original production ===
Directed by Michael Grandage, it premiered at the Donmar Warehouse theatre in London on 6 December 2006, running until 10 February 2007, starring Rhys Ifans as the lordly Don Juan, a priapic lothario cutting a swathe through modern Soho. Stephen Wight played his sidekick Stan, his "hilarious little Munchkin, keeper of the Blackberry" on which DJ stores a record of his 5,000 conquests; a performance which was to help Wight to win the Evening Standard Theatre Award 2007 for Outstanding Newcomer. Don Juan's wife was played by Laura Pyper while David Ryall portrayed his father, Louis. Adam Cork provided techno-Mozartian musical interludes.

Of the production, Benedict Nightingale in The Times wrote "Dont ask me how Ifans' DJ manages urbanely to pick up a posh girl while having fellatio with an un-posh one in a hospital corridor. Let's just say he does — and it's hilarious". There was critical praise for Christopher Oram's settings. "Keep an eye on that famous statue. Like so much in this production, it will astonish you".

=== West End ===
A new production opened in the West End theatre at the Wyndham's Theatre on 28 March 2017, following previews from 17 March. It was directed by Patrick Marber and starred David Tennant as Don Juan, Gawn Grainger as Louis and Adrian Scarborough as Stan. The production ended its run on 10 June 2017.

The production received mixed reviews. Commenting on the performances in his 4-star review for The Guardian, Michael Billington commented "Tennant’s performance that gives the play a disturbing ambivalence...Scarborough is equally good as his potato-faced sidekick". In his 2-star review for The Daily Telegraph, Dominic Cavendish was less favourable, stating "Not even David Tennant in a posing pouch can save this flaccid comedy...A red-light from me, then, for this flaccid affair although, for some, the temptation to ogle Tennant in the flesh will prove too great to resist."

== Sources ==
Theatre Record 2006
