= Nathaniel Parker =

English actor (born 1962)

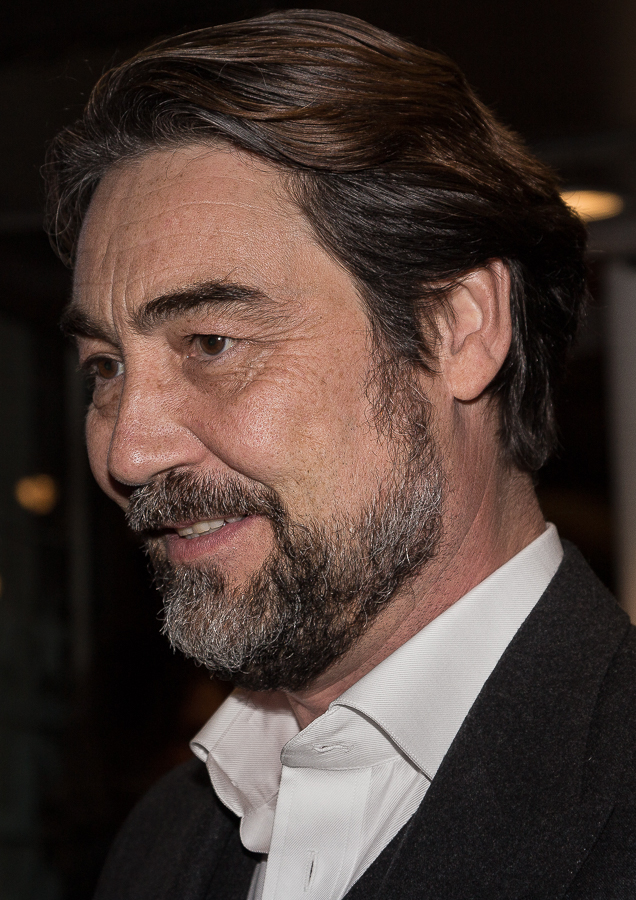
- Parker in 2015
- Born: 18 May 1962 (age 64); London, England
- Education: London Academy of Music and Dramatic Art
- Occupation: Actor
- Years active: 1988–present
- Spouse: Anna Patrick (m. 1992)
- Children: 2
- Website: nathanielparker.com

Nathaniel Parker (born 18 May 1962) is an English stage and screen actor best known for playing the lead in the BBC crime drama series The Inspector Lynley Mysteries, and Agravaine de Bois in the fourth series of Merlin.

== Early life ==
Nathaniel Parker was born in London, the youngest son of the businessman and one-time British Rail chairman Sir Peter Parker and Jillian, a GP and gardener, who wrote The Purest of Pleasures: Creation of a Romantic Garden. He has two older brothers: Alan, chairman of Brunswick Group, and Oliver Parker, a film director, and a sister, Lucy. Parker joined the National Youth Theatre, and after training at the London Academy of Music and Dramatic Art, became a member of the Royal Shakespeare Company in 1986.

== Career ==
=== Stage ===
Parker portrayed Bassanio in Peter Hall's 1989 production of The Merchant of Venice in London and on Broadway, co-starring with Dustin Hoffman.

In 2000, he played Bob in Rupert Goold's West End revival of David Mamet's Speed-the-Plow.

Parker returned to the stage in 2013 for the production of The Audience, starring Helen Mirren, written by Peter Morgan and directed by Stephen Daldry. Mirren appeared as Queen Elizabeth II, with Parker as Gordon Brown. The play ran for four months at the Gielgud Theatre in London. It was also transmitted worldwide via National Theatre Live and seen by more than 110,000 viewers in the UK and USA.

Parker played King Henry VIII in Wolf Hall (and Bring up the Bodies) for the Royal Shakespeare Company in 2014, earning a 2015 Laurence Olivier Award for Best Actor in a Supporting Role for the London production and appearing in New York City when the show moved on to Broadway, where his performance received a Tony Award nomination. He reprised the role at the Gielgud Theatre in 2021 for The Mirror and the Light, the third and final part of the trilogy.

Parker played Jack Weatherill in James Graham's This House at the Minerva Theatre, Chichester in September 2016 and took the same role to the Garrick Theatre in the West End of London on 19 November 2016.

=== Film and television ===
In a 2007 Radio Times interview, Parker said that his first big television break came in 1988 when he played a Battle of France pilot in ITV's six-part drama Piece of Cake. Another early role was Wilfred Owen in Derek Jarman's War Requiem, a 1989 film adaptation of Benjamin Britten's War Requiem with Laurence Olivier in his last screen role, as an old soldier. In 1989, Parker portrayed Jamie Jasper in the tenth episode of Inspector Morse "Deceived by Flight". Four years later, Parker played Edward Rochester in John Duigan's 1993 film adaptation of Jean Rhys' Wide Sargasso Sea. Reviewing this 'prequel' to Jane Eyre, Vincent Canby said in his review that Parker: "is exceptionally good in a difficult, shadowy role".

Parker played a variety of television costume drama roles, such as: Martin Jordan in the 1995 TV production of Joanna Trollope's A Village Affair, Gabriel Oak in the Granada/WGBH-TV co- production of Far From the Madding Crowd (1997), and Martin Tanley in the comedy film Beverly Hills Ninja (1997) with Chris Farley and Chris Rock. That year he portrayed King David in a made-for-TV film. He also played Rawdon Crawley in a BBC version of Vanity Fair (1998). The New York Times reviewer Caryn James said of his performance: "More than anyone else in the series, Nathaniel Parker brings some complexity to his character." He also played the irresponsible and selfish Harold Skimpole in the BAFTA-winning BBC1 dramatisation of Bleak House (2005).

From 2001 to 2007, Parker played the titular character in the long-running BBC1 crime series The Inspector Lynley Mysteries, perhaps his best-known role. His co-star was Sharon Small as his assistant, Detective Sergeant Barbara Havers. When the series premiered on PBS in 2002, The Wall Street Journal wrote that it was "fully worthy of the Mystery! label." At the same time, he played Master Gracey in The Haunted Mansion (2003), Albert Speer in the 2006 BBC production Nuremberg: Nazis on Trial, and Dunstan Thorn in the fantasy film Stardust (2007). Parker also appeared briefly in St Trinian's (directed by his brother, Oliver).

In 2011, Parker joined the cast of Merlin, to play the character of Agravaine de Bois for all 13 episodes of the fourth series. He also appeared in the independent comedy-drama The Perfect Host, alongside David Hyde Pierce.

In 2012, Parker was cast alongside YouTube reviewer Stuart Ashen in the Alienware-sponsored sci-fi thriller series The Proxy. He also appeared as Chief Inspector Armand Gamache of the Sûreté du Québec in the film adaptation of Louise Penny's murder mystery novel Still Life, set in rural Quebec. He also starred in the TV series, Me and Mrs Jones broadcast in 2012.

In July 2015, Parker played the domestic bully Dicky Carmichael in the BBC's two-part television adaptation of Sadie Jones' debut novel The Outcast. In June 2015, it was announced that Parker would play the role of King Achish in ABC TV's series Of Kings and Prophets.

In 2018, Parker appeared in two films, firstly as King Hamlet (better known as the Ghost), in Ophelia opposite Daisy Ridley, then as Lewis in the sports comedy-drama Swimming with Men. He also played Lord Chiltern in Oscar Wilde's An Ideal Husband at the Vaudeville Theatre; the production received positive reviews from critics and was later broadcast in cinemas.

In 2019, he played civil servant Sir Robert Hamilton in The Warrior Queen of Jhansi, a period drama about the life of Rani Lakshmi Bai, one of the leading figures in the Indian Rebellion of 1857. That same year, he appeared in the ITV drama A Confession as Richard Latham QC.

In 2021, Parker appeared on television in the Spanish-language romantic drama series The Vineyard as Edward Clayton, as well as ITV thriller The Beast Must Die. He also had a supporting role as Sir Robert de Thibouville, father of the heroine in the historical drama The Last Duel, directed by Ridley Scott. In 2022, he played Whale in romantic comedy Up on the Roof.

In 2023, Parker played Miles Dewson in British sci-fi thriller T.I.M.. The film was released on Netflix on 16 August. On television, he featured in Paramount+ period thriller The Doll Factory as Liston, and guest starred in one episode of Midsomer Murders, playing Brian Havergal. In 2024, Parker played Chef Bossard in the period wartime drama Desperate Journey, directed by Annabel Jankel.

=== Audio and voiceover work ===
Parker is a voiceover artist and has done work on audiobooks, including Eoin Colfer's children's Artemis Fowl series, the five books in Charlie Higson's Young James Bond series, and The Gardens of The Dead by William Brodrick. He read Mark Haddon's novel A Spot of Bother for BBC Radio Four's Book at Bedtime and played Axel in Jules Verne's Journey to the Centre of the Earth, first broadcast on BBC Radio Four Extra on 20 November 2011 and again on 12 November 2012. He has also voiced numerous video games and made many radio appearances as an interviewee and in radio dramas. A complete listing of Parker's extensive audio work can be found online.

== Personal life ==
Parker is married to actress Anna Patrick. The couple live in Gloucestershire with their two daughters.

== Filmography ==
=== Film ===
Year	Title	Role	Notes
1989	War Requiem	Wilfred Owen	
1990	Hamlet	Laertes	
1992	The Bodyguard	Clive Healy	
1993	Wide Sargasso Sea	Edward Rochester	
1994	Squanto: A Warrior's Tale	Thomas Dermer	
1995	Othello	Cassio	
1997	Beverly Hills Ninja	Martin Tanley	
1997	David	King David	
2001	Lover's Prayer	Father	
2003	The Haunted Mansion	Master Edward Gracey	
2006	Fade to Black	Viola	
2007	Flawless	Oliver Ashtoncroft	
2007	Stardust	Dunstan Thorn	
2007	I Really Hate My Job	Guy II	
2007	St Trinian's	Chairman of the National Gallery	
2009	Malice in Wonderland	Harry Hunt	
2010	The Perfect Host	Detective Morton	
2010	The Chronicles of Narnia: The Voyage of the Dawn Treader	Caspian IX	
2018	Swimming with Men	Lewis	
2018	Ophelia	King Hamlet	
2019	The Warrior Queen of Jhansi	Sir Robert Hamilton	
2021	The Last Duel	Sir Robert D'Thibouville	
2021	Hunting Bears	Kenny	
2023	T.I.M.	Dewson	

=== Television ===
Year	Title	Role	Notes
1988	Piece of Cake	Flying Officer 'Flash' Gordon	Miniseries, 6 episodes
1990	Inspector Morse	Jamie Jasper	1 episode (as Nat Parker)
1990	Never Come Back	Desmond Thane	Miniseries, 3 episodes, directed by Ben Bolt.
1990	Harry Enfield & Chums	Fire Man	4 episodes
1991	Heroes II: The Return	Ivan Lyon	Miniseries, 2 episodes
1991	Catherine Cookson's: The Black Candle	Lionel Filmore	TV film
1991	Agatha Christie's Poirot	Chris Davidson	Episode - The Affair at the Victory Ball
1993	Dancing Queen	Nigel	Television film
1994	Dangerous Games	Thomas Cranmer	Television film
1995	A Village Affair	Martin Jordan	Television film
1995	A Touch of Frost	Stephen Fillmore	1 episode
1997	Into Thin Air: Death on Everest	Rob Hall	Television film (as Nat Parker)
1998	Far from the Madding Crowd	Gabriel Oak	Television film
1998	Vanity Fair	Rawdon Crawley	Miniseries, 5 episodes
1998	McCallum	Dr. Dan Gallagher	1 episode
2001-2007	The Inspector Lynley Mysteries	DI Thomas Lynley	Main cast, 24 episodes
2003	The Private Life of Samuel Pepys	Charles II	Television film
2004	Happy Birthday Oscar Wilde	Himself	Television film
2005	Bleak House	Harold Skimpole	Miniseries, 10 episodes
2005	Dickens in America	Charles Dickens (voice)	Documentary series, 10 episodes
2006	Nuremberg: Nazis on Trial	Albert Speer	1 episode
2008	Hotel Babylon	Alexander Crawfield	1 episode
2009	The Courageous Heart of Irena Sendler	Dr. Majkowski	Television film
2009	Land Girls	Lord Lawrence Hoxley	Main cast, 5 episodes
2009	Lewis	Lieutenant Philip Coleman	1 episode
2009	My Family	Richard Harper	1 episode
2011	Injustice	Martin Newall	Miniseries, 4 episodes
2011	Merlin	Agravaine de Bois	Main cast, 13 episodes
2012	Me and Mrs Jones	Tom Marshall	Main cast, 6 episodes
2013	Still Life: A Three Pines Mystery	Chief Inspector Armand Gamache	Television film
2015	The Outcast	Dicky Carmichael	Miniseries, 2 episodes
2016	Of Kings and Prophets	King Achish	Main cast, 9 episodes
2019	Grantchester	Mr. Davenport	1 episode
2021	The Vineyard	Edward Claydon	Main cast
2023	Midsomer Murders	Brian Havergal	1 episode

== Theatre work ==
Unless noted otherwise, details of Parker's theatre work can be found here.

Year	Title	Role	Company	Theatre	Notes
1981	Richard III	Richard III	National Youth Theatre		
1982	Macbeth	Macbeth	National Youth Theatre		
1984	Trumpets and Drums (based on The Recruiting Officer)	Captain Brazen	London Academy of Music and Dramatic Art		
1985	Claw	Ludsby	Theatr Clwyd / Mold	Theatr Clwyd / Mold	
1985	Trumpets and Drums (based on The Recruiting Officer)	Captain Brazen	Theatr Clwyd / Mold	Theatr Clwyd / Mold	
1986	Romeo and Juliet	Tybalt	Young Vic, London	Old Vic	11.02.86
1986	The Gift		Royal Shakespeare Company (RSC)	Swan Theatre, Stratford-upon-Avon	
1986	The Kiss	Oliver	RSC		
1986-1987	The Winter's Tale	Florizel	RSC	Royal Shakespeare Theatre, Stratford-upon-Avon, Tyne Theatre, Newcastle upon Tyne, Barbican Theatre, London	
1986-1987	Every Man in His Humour	Wellbred	RSC	Swan Theatre, Stratford-upon-Avon, Mermaid Theatre, London, The People's Theatre, Newcastle upon Tyne	
1986-1987	The Rover	Don Pedro	RSC	Swan Theatre Stratford-upon-Avon, The People's Theatre Newcastle upon Tyne	
1986	Richard III	Harry Percy	RSC	Royal Shakespeare Theatre, Stratford-upon-Avon, Tyne Theatre, Newcastle upon Tyne, Barbican Theatre, London	
1987	The Storm	Vanya Kudryash	RSC	Pit, London	
1987	A Midsummer Night's Dream	Lysander	RSC	Barbican Theatre, London	
1989	The Merchant of Venice	Bassanio	Peter Hall Company	Phoenix Theatre, London, 46th Street Theater, New York	(UK) 01.06.1989, (US) 20.12.1989 to 24.02.1990
1997	Cargo Cult			Barbican Theatre	02.09.1987
1999	50 Revolutions		Oxford Stage Company	Whitehall Theatre, London	07.09.1999 to 25.09.1999
2000	Speed the Plow			Duke of York's Theatre, London	29.06.2000 to 19.08.2000
2008	Quartermaine's Terms	Quartermaine	Bill Kenwright 2008 Ltd.	Theatre Royal, Windsor; New Victoria Theatre, Woking; The Richmond Theatre, Theatre Royal, Bath, Theatre Royal, Brighton	13.05.2008 to 21.06.2008
2013	The Audience	Gordon Brown		Gielgud Theatre, London	15.02.2013 to 15.06.2013
2013/14	Wolf Hall	Henry VIII	RSC	Swan Theatre, Stratford-upon-Avon	11.12.2013 to 29.03.2014
2013/14	Bring Up the Bodies	Henry VIII	RSC	Swan Theatre, Stratford-Upon-Avon	19.12.2013 to 29.03.2014
2014	Wolf Hall	Henry VIII	RSC	The Aldwych Theatre, London	10.05.2014 to 04.10.2014
2014	Bring Up the Bodies	Henry VIII	RSC	The Aldwych Theatre, London	10.05.2014 to 04.10.2014
2015	Wolf Hall 1 & 2	Henry VIII	RSC	Winter Garden Theater, New York	20.03.2015 to 05.07.2015
2016	This House	Jack Weatherill	Headlong	Minerva Theatre, Chichester	25.09.2016 to 29.10.2016
2016	This House	Jack Weatherill	Headlong	Garrick Theatre, London	19.11.2016 to 25.02.2017
2021	The Mirror and the Light	Henry VIII	RSC	Gielgud Theatre, London	23.9.2021 to 28.11.2021
2023	Operation Epsilon	Otto Hahn		Southwark Playhouse, London	15.09.2023 to 21.10.2023
2025	Ragdoll	Robert	Jermyn Street Theatre	Jermyn Street Theatre, London	09.10.2025 to 15.11.2025
