= Michael Ahomka-Lindsay =

English actor

- Born: 1997 (age 28–29); Kingston upon Thames, Greater London, England
- Education: Royal Conservatoire of Scotland
- Years active: 2020–present

Michael Ahomka-Lindsay (born 1997) is an English actor. He is known for his work in theatre, receiving a WhatsOnStage Award nomination for his performance in the musical Newsies.

== Early life ==
Ahomka-Lindsay was born in South West London to a Ghanaian father and a Sierra Leonean mother. His father is a distant descendant of Sir John Lindsay, and added the nickname Ahomka to his surname. Ahomka-Lindsay moved around growing up, with stints in Zambia, Kenya, Atlanta, and then nine years in Ghana.

Upon returning to England at 16, Ahomka-Lindsay enrolled at Wellington College in Berkshire for sixth form. He began his studies in medicine at the University of Leeds before deciding to go into theatre. He joined the National Youth Theatre and earned an Andrew Lloyd Webber Foundation scholarship to train at the Royal Conservatoire of Scotland (RCS), graduating in 2021 with a Bachelor of Arts in Musical Theatre. He participated in the 2020 Stephen Sondheim Student Performer of the Year competition.

== Career ==
During the COVID-19 lockdown, Ahomka-Lindsay participated in The Show Must Go Online, for which he performed readings of the Shakespeare plays Henry V, Measure for Measure, As You Like It, and King Lear, as well as Ian Doescher's A Christmas Carol.

After graduating from drama school, Ahomka-Lindsay made his professional stage debut in Rent when it reopened in 2021 at the Hope Mill Theatre in Manchester after lockdown, taking over the role of Benjamin "Benny" Coffin III from Ahmed Hamad. He also went on the UK tour of the stage adaptation of The Lion, the Witch, and the Wardrobe.

In 2022, Ahomka-Lindsay played Emmett Forrest alongside Courtney Bowman in the Legally Blonde revival at Regent's Park Open Air Theatre, marking Ahomka-Lindsay's London stage debut, for which he received a Black British Theatre Award nomination for Best Male Lead Actor in a Musical. He also appeared in To the Streets! at the Birmingham Hippodrome. Later that year and into 2023, Ahomka-Lindsay starred as the lead character Jack Kelly in the original London cast of Newsies at Troubadour Wembley Park Theatre. For his performance, he won a Black British Theatre Award and was nominated for the WhatsOnStage Award for Best Performer in a Musical.

Ahomka-Lindsay then had a role as David Heard in Tarell Alvin McCraney's ensemble play Choir Boy at Bristol Old Vic as David Heard. In January 2024, he joined the cast of Cabaret at the Playhouse Theatre on the West End as Clifford Bradshaw. He returned to Bristol Old Vic for the Europe premiere of Matthew López's Reverberation opposite Eleanor Tomlinson.

== Stage ==
Year	Title	Role	Notes
2021	Rent	Benjamin "Benny" Coffin III	Hope Mill Theatre, Manchester
2021	The Lion, the Witch, and the Wardrobe	Maugrim	UK tour
2022	Legally Blonde	Emmett Forrest	Regent's Park Open Air Theatre, London
2022	To the Streets!	Paul Stephenson	Birmingham Hippodrome, Birmingham
2022	Newsies	Jack Kelly	Troubadour Wembley Park Theatre, London
2023	Choir Boy	David Heard	Bristol Old Vic, Bristol
2024	Cabaret	Clifford Bradshaw	Playhouse Theatre, London

== Awards and nominations ==
Year	Award	Category	Work	Result	Ref.
2022	Black British Theatre Awards	Best Male Lead Actor in a Musical	Legally Blonde	Nominated	
2023	Black British Theatre Awards	Best Male Lead Actor in a Musical	Newsies	Won	
2024	WhatsOnStage Awards	Best Performer in a Musical	Newsies	Nominated	
