= Get Up, Stand Up! The Bob Marley Musical =

2021 musical

Get Up, Stand Up!
- The Bob Marley Musical
- 2021 West End poster
- Music: Bob Marley
- Lyrics: Bob Marley
- Book: Lee Hall
- Basis: Life and music of Bob Marley
- Premiere: 20 October 2021: Lyric Theatre, London
- Productions: 2021 West End

Get Up, Stand Up! The Bob Marley Musical is a musical based on the life and music of Bob Marley written by Lee Hall.

== Production history ==
=== West End premiere (2021-2023) ===
The musical made its world premiere at the Lyric Theatre in London's West End on 20 October 2021, with previews from 1 October, starring Arinzé Kene as Bob Marley. The musical was originally due to open on 6 February 2021, but was postponed due to the ongoing COVID-19 pandemic.

In July 2020, it was announced that Clint Dyer had replaced Dominic Cooke as the production's director. The musical is choreographed by Shelley Maxwell, with set design by Chloe Lamford, costume design by Lisa Duncan, lighting design by Charles Balfour, sound design by Tony Gayle, sound effect design by Ben Grant and video design by Tal Yarden. Musical supervision and arrangements are by Phil Bateman, wigs, hair and make-up by Campbell Young, orchestration by Simon Hale, musical direction by Sean Green, and casting direction by Pippa Ailion.

The production was nominated for 4 Laurence Olivier Awards in 2022, including Best New Musical and Best Actor in a Musical for Kene.

In March 2022, Michael Duke took over the role of Bob Marley. Duke was previously the role’s alternate until Arinzé Kene’s departure.

On 4 August 2022, it was announced that the musical would make its final performance on 8 January 2023.

In October 2022, Duke won Best Male Actor in a Musical at the Black British Theatre Awards. The ceremony was held at the National Theatre in London.

== Cast and characters ==
Character	West End (2021)
Bob Marley	Arinzé Kene
Alternate Bob Marley	Michael Duke
Rita Marley	Gabrielle Brooks
Cindy Breakspeare	Shanay Holmes
Judy Mowatt	Sophia Mackay
Marcia Griffiths / I Three	Melissa Brown-Taylor
Bunny Wailer	Jacade Simpson
Peter Tosh	Natey Jones

=== Notable West End replacements ===
- Bob Marley: Michael Duke (began March 2022), David Albury (began October 2022)
- Alternate Bob Marley: David Albury (began March 2022), Ivano Turco (began October 2022)
- Rita Marley: Cleopatra Rey (began October 2022)

== Musical numbers ==
Act I

- Lively Up Yourself
- Could You Be Loved
- Trenchtown Rock
- Duppy Conqueror
- Is This Love
- Small Axe
- Stir It Up
- Concrete Jungle
- Talkin' Blues
- Roots, Rock, Reggae
- Turn Your Lights Down Low
- Kinky Reggae
- Rebel Music
- I Shot the Sheriff
- War
- Jamming

Act II

- Exodus
- Punky Reggae Party
- Waiting in Vain
- Running Away
- Jamming (Reprise)
- No Woman, No Cry
- So Much Things to Say
- Redemption Song
- Three Little Birds
- One Love
- Could You Be Loved (Reprise)
- Get Up, Stand Up

== Awards and nominations ==
Year	Award	Category	Nominee	Result
2022	Laurence Olivier Award	Best New Musical		Nominated
2022	Laurence Olivier Award	Best Actor in a Musical	Arinzé Kene	Nominated
2022	Laurence Olivier Award	Best Actress in a Supporting Role in a Musical	Gabrielle Brooks	Nominated
2022	Laurence Olivier Award	Best Original Score or New Orchestrations	Simon Hale	Won

== See also ==
- One Love: The Bob Marley Musical another 2017 musical based on the life and music of Bob Marley, written by Kwame Kwei-Armah
