= The Mirror & the Light =

Book by Hilary Mantel

- First edition
- Author: Hilary Mantel
- Language: English
- Series: Thomas Cromwell #3
- Genre: Historical fiction
- Publisher: Fourth Estate (UK); Henry Holt and Co. (US)
- Publication date: 5 March 2020 (UK); 10 March 2020 (US)
- Publication place: United Kingdom
- Media type: Print (hardback)
- Pages: 883
- ISBN: 9780007480999 (1st ed. UK hardcover)
- OCLC: 1126280860
- Dewey Decimal: 823.92
- LC Class: PR6063.A438 M36 2020
- Preceded by: Bring Up the Bodies

The Mirror & the Light is a 2020 historical novel by English writer Hilary Mantel and the final novel published in her lifetime, appearing two and a half years before her death. Following Wolf Hall (2009) and Bring Up the Bodies (2012), it is the final installment in her trilogy charting the rise and fall of Thomas Cromwell, minister in the court of King Henry VIII. It covers the last four years of his life, from 1536 until his death by execution in 1540.

Mantel's twelfth novel, her first in almost eight years, The Mirror & the Light enjoyed widespread critical acclaim and brisk sales upon its release. Emily Temple of Literary Hub reported that the novel had featured on thirteen lists of the best books of 2020. It was shortlisted for the 2020 Women's Prize for Fiction and won the 2021 Walter Scott Prize for historical fiction. Filming of a BBC television adaptation was completed in early 2024, and it was broadcast in the autumn of 2024.

== Plot ==
The Mirror & the Light covers the period following the death of Anne Boleyn in 1536. It describes Cromwell's ascent to the pinnacle of his riches and power, followed by his fall from royal favour and his public execution at Tower Hill in 1540.

== Publication ==
Though Mantel had originally hoped to publish the book in 2018, it did not appear until March 2020. Mantel dismissed speculation that the novel had been delayed due to writer's block, distractions caused by stage and screen adaptations of her previous novels, or because she could not bring herself to write Cromwell's execution scene. Saying the project had simply been difficult, Mantel added, "But that’s not an explanation that has any news value, so people are looking for a dramatic story of the whole process breaking down."

When it was published with Fourth Estate in the UK on 5 March 2020, bookstores opened at midnight to sell the title. Initial UK sales were brisk, with over 95,000 copies sold in the first three days. Henry Holt and Company published the US edition five days later, on 10 March 2020.

== Reception ==
The New York Times called it "the triumphant capstone to Mantel’s trilogy," the Financial Times called it "majestic and often breathtakingly poetic," and the Washington Post called it a "masterful finale." The Times Literary Supplement called it "some of the most complex and immersive fiction to have come along in years," while The Guardian hailed it as a "masterpiece" and called Mantel's Cromwell trilogy "the greatest English novels of this century." The Los Angeles Times called Mantel "unique among modern novelists in her ability to make the past as viscerally compelling as the present," USA Today said that "every page is rich with insight," and the Wall Street Journal called her Cromwell trilogy "a brilliant engagement with the exercise and metaphysics of power in 16th-century Europe." However, the New Yorker criticised its length (754 pages in the US edition), calling it "a bloated and only occasionally captivating work."

The Mirror & the Light was shortlisted for the 2020 Women's Prize for Fiction.

== Adaptations ==
=== Stage ===
Like the preceding volumes, The Mirror & the Light has been adapted for the stage, produced by the Royal Shakespeare Company with a script written by Mantel and Ben Miles. The play opened at the Gielgud Theatre, London in September 2021.

=== Television ===
In November 2023, Masterpiece and the BBC announced the television adaptation of The Mirror & the Light. In December 2023, production confirmed that many of the principal actors from the previous TV adaptation of Wolf Hall would be reprising their roles, including Mark Rylance as Thomas Cromwell and Damian Lewis as Henry VIII. Filming began in late 2023 and was completed in early 2024.

== See also ==
- Wolf Hall (2009), the first novel in the trilogy
- Bring Up the Bodies (2012), the second of the trilogy
- Wolf Hall Parts One & Two (2013), play adaptation of Wolf Hall & Bring Up the Bodies
- Wolf Hall (2015), the limited series BBC Two television adaptation of Wolf Hall and Bring Up the Bodies
- The Mirror and the Light (2021), a play version
- Wolf Hall: The Mirror and the Light (2024), the television adaptation
