= Ben Miles =

English actor

- Born: Benjamin Charles Miles; 29 September 1966 (age 60); Wimbledon, London, England
- Occupation: Actor
- Years active: 1989–present
- Spouse: Emily Raymond
- Children: 3

Benjamin Charles Miles (born 29 September 1966) is an English actor. He gained recognition after starring in the television comedy sitcom Coupling (2000–2004) and the drama serial The Forsyte Saga (2002–2003). He also had recurring roles in Lark Rise to Candleford (2008), The Crown (2016–2017) as Peter Townsend, and Andor (2022–2025).

== Early life and education ==
Benjamin Charles Miles was born in Wimbledon, London, and lived as a young man in Ashover, Derbyshire, attending Tupton Hall School. He began acting in school productions, which he pursued mainly because it allowed him to miss classes.

He studied acting at the Guildhall School of Music and Drama.

== Career ==
He moved into television roles in the 1990s, playing supporting roles in such series as Zorro, Soldier Soldier, Is It Legal?, The Bill, Peak Practice and Wonderful You.

Miles played a very small part as a journalist, with just a few words of dialogue, in the 1997 motion picture The Wings of the Dove. He had a leading role in The Round Tower, filmed later in 1997. In 1999, he was cast as Richard Martin in Reach For The Moon. In 2000, he was cast as Robert Brown in Cold Feet and the womanizing Patrick Maitland in the comedy series Coupling, a role which he played until the series ended in 2004. He continued other television work during his tenure in Coupling, appearing in The Forsyte Saga as Montague Dartie (this was the first time Miles acted with Amanda Root) and in Prime Suspect. In 2004, Miles portrayed Charles Ryder in the BBC Radio 4 production of Brideshead Revisited. Miles was the co-lead in the BBC drama, A Thing Called Love, filmed on location in Nottingham, England.

Miles appeared in the 2005 BBC television drama Mr Harvey Lights a Candle, playing the part of a teacher taking an unruly party of pupils on a daytrip to Salisbury Cathedral. In 2006, he appeared in the TV drama After Thomas as the father of a son with autism. In 2008, he appeared as the squire Sir Timothy in the British production Lark Rise to Candleford, and as Plantagenet Palliser in Radio 4 production The Pallisers. In 2009, he appeared as the head of a stock market trading firm in the BBC city-based drama Sex, the City and Me. He played the lead in Pulse opposite Claire Foy, whom he also co-starred with in The Promise in early 2011, just after also appearing in BBC 1's Zen. They were re-united again in The Crown.

Miles often works with director James McTeigue: he appeared in McTeigue's 2005 film V for Vendetta as Roger Dascombe, a government propagandist and television network executive. He appeared in Ninja Assassin, and in Speed Racer. On stage, he played Bolingbroke in the Old Vic's production of Richard II in 2005 alongside his father-in-law Gary Raymond. Miles also appeared in the play The Norman Conquests as Tom in 2009. The Norman Conquests won a Tony Award during his tenure in the play for Best Revival of a Play.

In summer 2011, Miles starred as Robert in Harold Pinter's Betrayal at the Comedy Theatre in London's West End, with Kristin Scott Thomas playing his wife, Emma. The love triangle was completed by Douglas Henshall as his best friend and her lover, Jerry. The revival was directed by Ian Rickson. Also in 2011 he appeared in the television film The Suspicions of Mr Whicher as Dr. Stapleton.

In 2014 Miles played Thomas Cromwell in the RSC version of Hilary Mantel's novels Wolf Hall and Bring Up the Bodies in Stratford and at the Aldwych Theatre in London. In April 2015 the RSC brought the plays to New York City, where his performance was nominated for Best Leading Actor in a Play at the Tony Awards.

In 2016, he played Peter Townsend in the Netflix series The Crown, and the Duke of Somerset in The Hollow Crown: The Wars of the Roses, the second cycle in a series of television film adaptations of William Shakespeare's history plays. In the same year, he also had a guest role as Chancellor Tom Pickering in an episode of the anthology series Black Mirror ("Hated in the Nation").

In 2017, he voiced the Time Traveller in a Big Finish Productions adaptation of The Time Machine, and Ace in the UK dub of Bob the Builder: Mega Machines.

In 2018, he played DSU Jack Haley in the BBC Two miniseries Collateral and Simon's father George Burrows in the series The Romanoffs, and appeared on stage at the Lyttelton Theatre as one of the Lehman Brothers in The Lehman Trilogy.

In 2019 he played Commander Danny Hart in The Capture and John Profumo in The Trial of Christine Keeler, both on BBC One.

In 2021, it was announced that he would appear in a new Star Wars spin-off television series for Disney, Andor. Miles played Tay Kolma, a banker friend of Mon Mothma (played by Genevieve O'Reilly).

He collaborated with Hilary Mantel on the adaptation of her novel, The Mirror & the Light, into a play at the Gielgud Theatre in London's West End, in which he also starred. The two worked again on a picture book based on her trilogy,, and she chose him to read the audiobook versions.

== Personal life ==
Miles married the actress Emily Raymond. They have three children. The two also appeared together in the episode of Peak Practice, "Before The Lights Go Out" in 1999.

== Filmography ==
=== Film ===
Year	Title	Role	Notes
1989	Getting It Right	Spiro	
1997	The Wings of the Dove	Journalist #1	
1997	Keep the Aspidistra Flying	Ravenscroft Waiter	US Title: A Merry War
2001	The Affair of the Necklace	Baron Courchamps	
2003	Three Blind Mice	Lindsey	
2005	Imagine Me & You	Rob	
2006	V for Vendetta	Roger Dascombe	
2008	Speed Racer	Cass Jones	
2009	Ninja Assassin	Europol Agent Ryan Maslow	
2015	Woman in Gold	Ronald Lauder	
2018	The Catcher Was a Spy	Jerry Fredericks	
2018	Red Joan	Nick	
2023	Tetris	Howard Lincoln	
2023	Widow Clicquot	Philippe Clicquot	
2023	Napoleon	Caulaincourt	
2024	Canary Black	DCIA Nathan Evans	
2026	Flavia	King George	

=== Television ===
Year	Title	Role	Notes
1990–1991	Zorro	José Rivas	2 episodes
1995	Soldier Soldier	John McGovern	1 episode
1996	Is It Legal?	Tom	1 episode
1997	Melissa	1st Editor	1 episode
1998	The Round Tower	Angus Cotton	Television movie
1997–1999	The Bill	D.C. Colin Waterman / Dan Price	2 episodes
1998	The Life and Crimes of William Palmer	Thomas Palmer	2 episodes
1999	Wonderful You	Ray	4 episodes
1999–2000	Peak Practice	Rob Sinclair	5 episodes
2000	Reach for the Moon	Richard Martin	Television miniseries
2000	Cold Feet	Robert Brown	7 episodes
2000–2004	Coupling	Patrick Maitland	28 episodes
2001	Holby City	Ed Somers	Episode: "Tip of the Iceberg"
2002–2003	The Forsyte Saga	Montague Dartie	
2003	Prime Suspect 6	DCI Simon Finch	2 episodes
2004	Hustle	Stephen Winterborn	1 episode
2005	The Government Inspector	Kevin Marsh	Television movie
2005	Under the Greenwood Tree	Parson Maybold	Television film
2008	Lark Rise to Candleford	Sir Timothy Midwinter	10 episodes
2009	Agatha Christie's Marple	Percival Fortescue	Episode: "A Pocket Full of Rye"
2010	Pulse	Joe Sennet	Television movie
2011	Zen	Amedeo Colonna	3 episodes Television miniseries
2011	The Promise	Max Meyer	4 episodes Television miniseries
2011	The Suspicions of Mr Whicher	Dr. Stapleton	Episode: "The Murder at Road Hill House"
2011	Masterpiece Mystery	Amedeo Colonna	Episode: "Ratking"
2013–2014	Dracula	Browning	10 episodes
2016	The Hollow Crown	Duke of Somerset	2 episodes Television miniseries
2016	Black Mirror	Tom Pickering	Episode: Hated In The Nation
2016–2017, 2022	The Crown	Peter Townsend	Main role (Seasons 1–2); Guest role (Season 5); 10 episodes
2017–2018	Bob the Builder	Ace (voice)	UK version 4 episodes
2017	The Last Post	Major Harry Markham	6 episodes
2018	Collateral	DSU Jack Haley	4 episodes
2018	The Romanoffs	George Burrows	Episode: "The One That Holds Everything"
2019–present	The Capture	Commander Daniel "Danny" Hart	Main role
2019–2020	The Trial of Christine Keeler	John Profumo	6 episodes
2019	The One Show	Himself	One episode
2020	Devils	Edward Stuart	2 episodes
2022–2025	Andor	Tay Kolma	7 episodes
2023	Hijack	Captain Robin Allen	Main role
2024	Douglas Is Cancelled	Toby	Main role
2025	The Trial	David Sinclair	Lead role
2025	Death by Lightning	George Scovile	Television miniseries
2025	The Girlfriend	Max Kader	Television miniseries
2026	Vienna Game	Viscount Castlereagh	Television miniseries

=== Video Games ===
Year	Title	Role	Notes
2024	Elden Ring Shadow of the Erdtree	Sir Ansbach	Elden Ring DLC
