= Black British Theatre Awards =

Annual award for Black performers and productions

The Black British Theatre Awards (BBTAs) have been presented annually since 2019 to recognise excellence among Black performers, creatives and theatre productions in the United Kingdom.

== History ==
The BBTAs were established in 2019 and first awarded in October of that year, to coincide with Black History Month. They were created by Solange Urdang and Omar F. Okai. The Awards celebrate black artists and creatives who have contributed to British theatre beginning with the 1950s, highlighting a lack of recognition towards Black talent and with the hope that the prize will improve their visibility and recognition.

Lucy St Louis, the BBTAs Best Female Actor in a Musical in 2021, was the first Black female actress to play Christine Daaé in the London production of The Phantom of the Opera. Following this, she played Glinda in Wicked as Glinda opposite Alexia Khadime as Elphaba, marking the first time both leading roles were played by actors of color.

In 2022 the awards' public votes quadrupled from the previous year.

The 2026 ceremony - due to place in October - was cancelled in July of that year, with organisers blaming "unforeseen circumstances".

=== Eligibility for nomination ===
Anyone can submit one nomination for BBTAs each year (August to July) by completing an online form. Nominees must have lived in the UK for at least 3 years to be considered or be British Nationals and "of Black of African or Caribbean descent or of Mixed Ethnicity". Productions must have at least 50% eligible performers, or the production was based on black subject matter. A shortlist of nominees is announced before the ceremony.

== Ceremony ==
The awards ceremony has been hosted Cynthia Erivo, Danny Sapani, Giles Terera and Layton Williams, among others.

The 2019 BBTAs were held at The Old Finsbury Town Hall in Islington on 27 October, hosted by Ore Oduba.

Amidst the COVID-19 pandemic theatre shutdown in London, the 2020 BBTAs were broadcast on Sky Arts on 25 October and took place, with social distancing rules in place, at the Young Vic, hosted by Eddie Nestor. Founders and directors Urdang and Okai said regarding the year's awards, "with UK Theatre coming to a standstill and The Black Lives Matter movement protests [we] hope to bring positivity to such a difficult time".

The 2021 BBTAs were held on 21 October at The Old Finsbury Town Hall, hosted by Erivo and Sapani. Guest presenters included previous winners Miriam-Teak Lee and Layton Williams, as well as Jason Pennycooke.

The 2022 BBTAs were held on 16 October 2022 at the National Theatre, again hosted by Sapani.

The 2023 BBTAs were held on 29 October 2023 at the National Theatre, Lyttelton.

The 2024 BBTAs were held on 4 November 2024 at the Lyceum Theatre, sponsored by Disney Theatrical Group.

The 2025 BBTAs nomination period opened on 1 June 2025 and nominations were announced in September 2025. The 2025 ceremony was held at the Piccadilly Theatre on 26 October 2025 and had various presenters through the night, including Vanessa Williams, Matt Henry and Miriam-Teak Lee.

== Award categories ==
In addition to acting, director and production categories, an award is given to people who identify, nurture and develop talent through the stage school process; awards are given for a body of work, including a Lifetime Achievement award.

=== Drama ===
- Best Production - Play
- Best Director
- Best Male Lead Actor in a Play
- Best Female Lead Actor in a Play
- Best Supporting Male Actor in a Play
- Best Supporting Female Actor in a Play

=== Musical Theatre ===
- Best Musical Production
- Best Musical Director
- Best Male Lead Actor in a Musical
- Best Female Lead Actor in a Musical
- Best Supporting Male Actor in a Musical
- Best Supporting Female Actor in a Musical

=== Other ===
- Best Producer
- Best Choreographer or Movement Director
- Best Dance Production or Performer
- Best Use of Innovation and Technology (not awarded in 2023 and 2024)
- Best Lighting Design
- Best Sound Design
- Best Theatre Design
- Best Playwright (launched in 2023)
- Best Casting Director (not awarded in 2023 and 2024)
- Costume Design Recognition (not awarded in 2023)
- Theatre Design Recognition (launched in 2023)
- Book and Lyrics Recognition
- LGBTQ+ Champion Award
- Disability Champion Award
- Best Child Performer
- Best Non Binary Performer (launched in 2023)
- Best Teacher
- Best Graduate
- Founders Choice Award
- Lifetime Achievement Award
- Lord Michael Hastings of Scarisbrick Award (launched in 2023)

== See also ==
- Laurence Olivier Awards
- Standard Theatre Awards
- Ian Charleson Awards
- The Offies
- WhatsOnStage Awards
- Critics' Awards for Theatre in Scotland
- Theatre Book Prize
- UK Theatre Awards
- Tony Awards
- Alfred Fagon Award
