= Wolf Hall =

2009 historical novel by Hilary Mantel

- Author: Hilary Mantel
- Audio read by: Simon Slater (2009); Ben Miles (2020)
- Language: English
- Genre: Historical fiction
- Publisher: Fourth Estate (UK)
- Publication date: 30 April 2009
- Publication place: United Kingdom
- Media type: Print (hardcover and paperback)
- Pages: 672
- ISBN: 978-1554687787
- Dewey Decimal: 823.92
- LC Class: PR6063.A438 W65 2009
- Followed by: Bring Up the Bodies

Wolf Hall is a 2009 historical novel by English author Hilary Mantel, published by Fourth Estate, named after the Seymour family's seat of Wolfhall, or Wulfhall, in Wiltshire. Set in the period from 1500 to 1535, Wolf Hall is a sympathetic fictionalised biography documenting the rapid rise to power of Thomas Cromwell in the court of Henry VIII through to the death of Sir Thomas More. The novel won both the Booker Prize and the National Book Critics Circle Award. In 2012, The Observer named it as one of "The 10 best historical novels".

The book is the first in a trilogy; the sequel Bring Up the Bodies was published in 2012. The last book in the trilogy is The Mirror and the Light (2020), which covers the last four years of Cromwell's life.

== Summary ==
In 1500, the teenage Thomas Cromwell ran away from home to flee his abusive father and sought his fortune as a soldier in France.

By 1527, the well-travelled Cromwell had returned to England and was now a lawyer, a married father of three, and highly respected as the right-hand man of Cardinal Thomas Wolsey, with a reputation for successful deal-making. His life takes a tragic turn when his wife and two daughters abruptly die of the sweating sickness, leaving him a widower. His sister-in-law, Johane, comes to keep house for him.

Cromwell is still in Wolsey's service in 1529 when the Cardinal falls out of favour with King Henry VIII because he failed to arrange an annulment of the King's marriage to Catherine of Aragon. Cromwell manages to buy the Cardinal a little time before everything the Cardinal owns is repossessed and given to Henry's mistress, Anne Boleyn. Cromwell subsequently decides to relocate the Cardinal and his entourage to a second home in Esher, and the Cardinal moves on to York.

Though he knows the Cardinal is doomed, Cromwell begins negotiations on his behalf with the King. During his visits, he meets the recently widowed Mary Boleyn, Anne's elder sister, and is intrigued by her. Cromwell is eventually summoned to meet Anne and finds Henry's loyalty to her unfathomable.

Continuing to gain favour with both the King and Anne, Cromwell is disturbed by Wolsey's activities in York but is shocked when he learns that the Cardinal has been recalled to London to face treason charges and has died on the way. Cromwell mourns his death and vows to take vengeance on those involved in his downfall. Despite his known loyalty to Wolsey, Cromwell retains his favoured status with the King and is sworn into the King's council after interpreting one of Henry's nightmares about his deceased elder brother as a symbol that Henry should govern with the blessing of his late father and brother.

Cromwell continues to advise Anne and works towards her ascent to Queen, hoping he will rise too. Just as the wedding appears imminent, Henry Percy, a former lover of Anne's, declares that he is her legal husband and still loves her. Cromwell visits Percy on Anne's behalf and threatens him into silence, securing his position as a favourite in the Howard household.

King Henry travels to France for a successful conference with the French. Finally, secure in her position, Anne can marry Henry privately and consummate their relationship. She quickly becomes pregnant, and Henry has her crowned Queen in a ceremony that Cromwell perfectly organises.

== Historical background ==
Born to a working-class family of no position or name, Cromwell became the right-hand man of Cardinal Thomas Wolsey, adviser to the King. He survived Wolsey's fall from grace to eventually become the most powerful of Henry's ministers. In that role, he observed turning points in English history, as Henry asserted his authority to declare his marriage annulled from Catherine of Aragon, married Anne Boleyn, broke from Rome, established the independence of the Church of England, and called for the dissolution of the monasteries.

The novel is a re-envisioning of historical and literary records; in Robert Bolt's play A Man for All Seasons Cromwell is portrayed as the calculating, unprincipled opposite of Thomas More's honour and decency. Mantel's novel offers an alternative to that portrayal, an intimate portrait of Cromwell as a tolerant, pragmatic, and talented man attempting to serve King, country, and family amid the political machinations of Henry's court and the religious upheavals of the Reformation, in contrast to More's viciously punitive adherence to the old Roman Catholic order that Henry is sweeping away.

== Process ==
Mantel said she spent five years researching and writing the book, trying to match her fiction to the historical record. To avoid contradicting history she created a card catalogue, organised alphabetically by character, with each card containing notes indicating where a particular historical figure was on relevant dates. She explained: "You really need to know, where is the Duke of Suffolk at the moment? You can't have him in London if he's supposed to be somewhere else."

In an interview with The Guardian, Mantel stated her aim to place the reader in "that time and that place, putting you into Henry's entourage. The essence of the thing is not to judge with hindsight, not to pass judgment from the lofty perch of the 21st century when we know what happened. It's to be there with them in that hunting party at Wolf Hall, moving forward with imperfect information and perhaps wrong expectations, but in any case, moving forward into a future that is not pre-determined but where chance and hazard will play a terrific role."

== Characters ==
Wolf Hall includes a large cast of fictionalised historical persons. In addition to those already mentioned, prominent characters include:

- Stephen Gardiner, Master Secretary to King Henry
- Princess Mary, Henry and Catherine's daughter and only surviving child, later Queen Mary I of England.
- Mary Boleyn, sister of Anne
- Thomas Boleyn, father of Anne and Mary
- Thomas Howard, 3rd Duke of Norfolk, Anne's uncle
- Thomas Cranmer, Archbishop of Canterbury
- Jane Seymour, who later became the third of Henry's six wives
- Rafe Sadler, Thomas Cromwell's ward
- Eustace Chapuys, Ambassador to England of Charles V, Holy Roman Emperor

== Title ==
The title comes from the name of the Seymour family seat at Wolfhall or Wulfhall in Wiltshire; the title's allusion to the old Latin saying Homo homini lupus ("Man is wolf to man") serves as a constant reminder of the dangerously opportunistic nature of the world through which Cromwell navigates.

== Reception ==
=== Critical reception ===
In The Guardian, Christopher Tayler wrote "Wolf Hall succeeds on its own terms and then some, both as a non-frothy historical novel and as a display of Mantel's extraordinary talent. Lyrically yet cleanly and tightly written, solidly imagined yet filled with spooky resonances, and very funny at times, it's not like much else in contemporary British fiction. A sequel is apparently in the works, and it's not the least of Mantel's achievements that the reader finishes this 650-page book wanting more."

Susan Bassnett, in Times Higher Education, wrote in a rare negative review, "dreadfully badly written... Mantel just wrote and wrote and wrote. I have yet to meet anyone outside the Booker panel who managed to get to the end of this tedious tome. God forbid there might be a sequel, which I fear is on the horizon."

In The Observer, Olivia Laing wrote, "Over two decades, she has gained a reputation as an elegant anatomiser of malice and cruelty. From the French Revolution of A Place of Greater Safety (1992) to the Middle England of Beyond Black (2005), hers are scrupulously moral – and scrupulously unmoralistic – books that refuse to shy away from the underside of life, finding even in disaster a bleak and unconsoling humour. That supple movement between laughter and horror makes this rich pageant of Tudor life her most humane and bewitching novel."

Vanora Bennett in The Times wrote, "as soon as I opened the book I was gripped. I read it almost non-stop. When I did have to put it down, I was full of regret; the story was over, a regret I still feel. This is a wonderful and intelligently imagined retelling of a familiar tale from an unfamiliar angle – one that makes the drama unfolding nearly five centuries ago look new again and shocking again, too."

=== Controversy over historical accuracy ===
Wolf Hall has been lauded by historians for its nuanced and extensively researched portrayal of Cromwell. The ecclesiastical historian and biographer of Cromwell, Diarmaid MacCulloch, praised Mantel for depicting "the fine grain detail of the [Tudor] period", and noted similarities between Mantel's character and the person he "was meeting by looking at the original sources." Tracy Borman also praised Mantel's work, and has stated that it inspired her to write her own historical biography of Cromwell. Early modern historian Samantha Rogers cited Wolf Hall as the "gold standard" of historical fiction set in the Tudor era, while admitting it left out some details unfavorable to Cromwell.

Praise was not unanimous. In The Washington Post, Gregory Wolfe criticized the author's stated intention to rebalance the glowing depiction of Thomas More in the 1954 stage play, A Man for All Seasons. To support his position, Wolfe cited negative judgements of Mantel's portrayal of Cromwell by the historians David Starkey (saying that in Starkey's view the novel's plot is "total fiction" without "a scrap of evidence"), Simon Schama (who has written that "the documents [he had seen] shouted to high heaven that Thomas Cromwell was, in fact, a detestably self-serving, bullying monster who perfected state terror in England, cooked the evidence, and extracted confessions by torture"), and Eamon Duffy. Elsewhere, Duffy has expressed his bewilderment at Mantel's sympathetic literary portrayal of Cromwell (as well as Mark Rylance's interpretation in the later television adaptation). In an opinion article in The Guardian, the religious commentator and historian Catherine Pepinster alluded to accusations by critics of "ideological bias" against Roman Catholicism. While implicating the novels as "bad history", the neo-conservative Catholic author George Weigel has claimed that their success offered proof "that anti-Catholicism is the last acceptable bigotry in elite circles in the Anglosphere."

=== Awards and lists ===
A poll of literary experts by the Independent Bath Literature Festival voted Wolf Hall the greatest novel from 1995 to 2015. It also ranked third in a BBC Culture poll of the best novels since 2000. In 2019, The Guardian's list of the 100 best books of the 21st century ranked Wolf Hall first.

In July 2024, The New York Times named Wolf Hall the third best book of the 21st century.

=== Sales ===
On top of the laudatory critical reception, Wolf Hall has enjoyed commercial success. Upon its release in 2009, it was the fastest-selling Booker winner since the organization began tracking such data. In a blog post after Mantel’s death in 2022, Booker stated that the book has sold an estimated 1.09 million copies which makes it the second-highest winner after Life of Pi. The overall trilogy has sold an estimated 5 million copies worldwide and been translated into over 40 languages.

== Awards and nominations ==
- Winner – 2009 Booker Prize. James Naughtie, the chairman of the Booker Prize judges, said the decision to give Wolf Hall the award was "based on the sheer bigness of the book. The boldness of its narrative, its scene setting ... The extraordinary way that Hilary Mantel has created what one of the judges has said was a contemporary novel, a modern novel, which happens to be set in the 16th century".
- Winner – 2009 National Book Critics Circle Award for fiction.
- Winner – 2010 Walter Scott Prize for historical fiction.
- Winner – 2010 The Morning News Tournament of Books.
- Winner – 2010 Audie Award for Literary Fiction for the audiobook narrated by Simon Slater
- Winner – 2010 AudioFile magazine Earphone Award for the audiobook narrated by Simon Slater

== Adaptations ==
=== Stage ===
In January 2013, the Royal Shakespeare Company (RSC) announced it would stage adaptations by Mike Poulton of Wolf Hall and Bring Up the Bodies in its Winter season. The production transferred to London's Aldwych Theatre in May 2014, for a limited run until October.

Producers Jeffrey Richards and Jerry Frankel brought the London productions of Wolf Hall and Bring Up the Bodies, starring Ben Miles as Thomas Cromwell; Lydia Leonard as Anne Boleyn; Lucy Briers as Catherine of Aragon; and Nathaniel Parker as Henry VIII, to Broadway's Winter Garden Theatre in March 2015 for a 15-week run. The double-bill has been re-titled Wolf Hall, Parts 1 and 2 for American audiences. The play was nominated for eight Tony Awards, including Best Play.

=== Television ===
In 2012, the BBC announced it would adapt Wolf Hall and Bring Up the Bodies for BBC Two, for broadcast in 2015. On 8 March 2013, the BBC announced Mark Rylance had been cast as Thomas Cromwell. The first episode was broadcast in the United States on PBS's Masterpiece on 5 April 2015. In June 2015, Amazon announced exclusive rights to stream Masterpiece programmes, including Wolf Hall, on Amazon Prime. After suffering an extensive delay due to the COVID-19 pandemic, the second series adapting the third book, The Mirror and the Light, was filmed between November 2023 and April 2024 and aired in the UK on 10 November 2024.

== Translations ==
- Dutch: Wolf Hall. Translated by Ine Willems. Amsterdam: Signatuur. 1 September 2010. ISBN 9789056723620.
- Portuguese: Wolf Hall. Translated by Beatriz Sequeira. São Paulo: Civilização. 9 April 2010. ISBN 9789722631044.
- Italian: Wolf Hall. Translated by Giuseppina Oneto. Rome: Fazi. 14 January 2011. ISBN 9788864111957.
- Finnish: Susipalatsi. Translated by Kaisa Sivenius. Helsinki: Teos. 21 April 2011. ISBN 9789518513349.
- German: Wölfe, lit. 'Wolves'. Translated by Christiane Trabant. Cologne: DuMont. 2 April 2012. ISBN 9783832161934.
- Polish: W komnatach Wolf Hall, lit. 'In the Chambers of Wolf Hall'. Translated by Urszula Gardner. Katowice: Sonia Draga. 15 May 2013. ISBN 9788375087956.
- Vietnamese: Lâu Đài Sói. Translated by Nguyễn Chí Hoan. Hanoi: Nhã Nam. 9 September 2016. ISBN 9786046984733.

== See also ==
- Cultural depictions of Henry VIII
