= Bring Up the Bodies =

Historical novel by Hilary Mantel

Bring up the Bodies
- First edition
- Author: Hilary Mantel
- Audio read by: Simon Vance
- Language: English
- Series: Thomas Cromwell #2
- Genre: Historical fiction
- Publisher: Fourth Estate (UK); Henry Holt and Co. (US)
- Publication date: 8 May 2012
- Publication place: United Kingdom
- Media type: Print (hardback)
- Pages: 432 pp
- ISBN: 9780805090031
- OCLC: 773667451
- Dewey Decimal: 823.92
- LC Class: PR6063.A438 B75 2012
- Preceded by: Wolf Hall
- Followed by: The Mirror & the Light

Bring Up the Bodies is a historical novel by British writer Hilary Mantel, sequel to the award-winning Wolf Hall (2009), and part of a trilogy charting the rise and fall of Thomas Cromwell, the powerful minister in the court of King Henry VIII. It won the 2012 Man Booker Prize and the 2012 Costa Book of the Year. The final novel in the trilogy is The Mirror & the Light (2020).

== Plot ==
Bring Up the Bodies follows closely upon the events of Wolf Hall. The King and Cromwell—now Master Secretary to the King's Privy Council—are guests of the Seymour family at Wolf Hall. Cromwell himself is attracted to the Seymours' daughter Jane.

The King spends time with Jane Seymour and begins to fall in love; his marriage to the new queen, Anne Boleyn, is sometimes loving but often descends into angry quarrels. "I cannot live as I have lived," Henry finally tells Cromwell in private. He has tired of Anne, who brings him neither peace nor a son, and wants his marriage ended. Cromwell vows to make this happen.

Cromwell tries to negotiate a separation through Anne's father, Wiltshire, and her brother, Rochford. Wiltshire is willing to negotiate; Rochford is not, and tells Cromwell that if Anne's marriage to the King endures he will "make short work of you."

Cromwell talks to those close to Anne, and hears a number of reports on her supposed unfaithfulness to the King. The musician, Mark Smeaton, and Anne's sister-in-law, Lady Rochford, pass on rumours to this effect. Cromwell begins to build his case. With proof enough to have her tried for treason, the King is willing to see Anne destroyed to serve his ends. Mindful that many of those closest to Anne helped ruin his mentor, Cardinal Wolsey, Cromwell relishes the opportunity to bring them down, despite being unsure that all of the evidence is true.

Anne and several of her circle, including her brother, are tried and put to death. The King moves to wed Jane Seymour and rewards Cromwell with a barony. Having engineered the King's new marriage, and with the new Queen's family as his firm allies, his position as Henry's chief adviser is now assured.

== Publication ==
Bring Up the Bodies was published in May 2012 by HarperCollins in the United Kingdom and by Henry Holt and Co. in the United States to critical acclaim.

== Reception ==
Janet Maslin reviewed the novel positively in The New York Times:

[The book's] ironic ending will be no cliffhanger for anyone even remotely familiar with Henry VIII's trail of carnage. But in Bring Up the Bodies it works as one. The wonder of Ms. Mantel's retelling is that she makes these events fresh and terrifying all over again."

It was listed by The New York Times as #95 in its list of 100 Best Books of the 21st century.

== Adaptations ==
In January 2014, the Royal Shakespeare Company (RSC) staged a two-part adaptation of both Wolf Hall and Bring Up the Bodies in its winter season, with a script by Mantel and Mike Poulton. Premiering at the Swan Theatre, Stratford-upon-Avon, it transferred to the Aldwych Theatre, London, later that year.

A six-part BBC television series Wolf Hall, the adaptation of the books Wolf Hall and Bring Up the Bodies, starring Mark Rylance, Damian Lewis and Jonathan Pryce, was broadcast in the UK in January 2015 and the United States in April 2015.

== Awards and honours ==
- 2012 Booker Prize, winner
- 2012 Specsavers National Book Awards "UK Author of the Year"
- 2012 Costa Book Awards (Novel), winner
- 2012 Costa Book Awards (Book of the Year), winner
- 2012 Salon What To Read Awards
- 2013 Walter Scott Prize for Historical Fiction, shortlist
