= Todrick Hall discography =

Recording artist discography

- Studio albums: 6
- EPs: 5
- Soundtrack albums: 2
- Live albums: 1
- Singles: 36

The discography of American recording artist and YouTuber Todrick Hall consists of six studio albums, two soundtrack albums, two reissues, one live album, five extended plays, and 36 singles.

== Albums ==
=== Studio albums ===
Title	Details	Peak chart positions		
Title	Details	US	US Heat.	US Indie
Somebody's Christmas	Released: December 15, 2010; Label: Self-released; Format: Digital download	—	—	—
Straight Outta Oz	Released: June 23, 2016; Label: Self-released; Format: Digital download	142	2	11
Forbidden	Released: March 27, 2018; Label: Self-released; Formats: Digital download	— (Note: Forbidden did not enter the main Billboard 200 chart, but peaked at number 11 on the Billboard Digital Albums chart and number 60 on the Billboard Top Album Sales, components of the main chart.)	2	10
Femuline	Released: June 8, 2021; Label: Frtyfve; Formats: Digital download	—	—	—
Femuline Gaymeova	Released: January 21, 2022; Label: Frtyfve; Formats: Digital download	—	—	—
Algorhythm	Released: June 1, 2022; Label: Frtyfve; Formats: Digital download	—	—	—

=== Reissues ===
Title	Details
Straight Outta Oz (Deluxe Edition)	Released: March 21, 2017; Label: Self-released; Format: Digital download
Femuline Reloaded	Released: November 17, 2021; Label: FrtyFve; Format: Digital download

=== Soundtrack albums ===
Title	Details
Pop Star High	Released: April 1, 2014; Label: Self-released; Format: Digital download
MTV's Todrick: The Music, Vol. 1	Released: October 13, 2015; Label: Self-released; Format: Digital download

=== Live albums ===
Title	Details
Haus Party (Live in Atlanta, 2019)	Released: November 26, 2020; Label: FrtyFve; Format: Digital download

== Extended plays ==
Title	Details	Peak chart positions					
Title	Details	US Digital	US Sales	US Heat.	US Indie	US Dance/ Elec.	US R&B/HH Sales
Dear Santa	Released: December 19, 2013; Label: Self-released; Format: Digital download	—	—	—	—	—	—
Haus Party, Pt. 1	Released: May 23, 2019; Label: Self-released; Formats: Digital download, streaming	24	—	11	24	11	—
Haus Party, Pt. 2	Released: September 19, 2019; Label: Self-released; Formats: Digital download, streaming	25	81	6	21	—	7
Quarantine Queen	Released: April 29, 2020; Label: Self-released; Formats: Digital download	—	—	—	—	—	—
Haus Party, Pt. 3	Released: February 12, 2021; Label: Self-released; Formats: Digital download, streaming	—	—	—	—	—	—

== Singles ==
=== As lead artist ===
Title	Year	Peak chart positions		Album
Title	Year	US Dance/ Electronic	US Dance Club	Album
"It Gets Better"	2010	—	—	non-album singles
"I Wanna Be on Glee"	2011	—	—	non-album singles
"The Bieber"	2011	—	—	non-album singles
"Just Love"	2011	—	—	non-album singles
"Barack Yo'Body"	2011	—	—	non-album singles
"#SplitsOnTrees" (featuring Unterreo Edwards)	2013	—	—	non-album singles
"The Wizard of Ahhhs" (featuring Pentatonix)	2013	—	—	non-album singles
"It Gets Better" (acoustic)	2013	—	—	non-album singles
"Hold On We're Going Home" (featuring Chester Lockhart)	2013	—	—	non-album singles
"Freaks Like Me" (featuring Mack Z & the ALDC)	2014	—	—	non-album singles
"Disney Dudez 2" (with IM5)	2014	—	—	non-album singles
"Disney Dudez 3" (with IM5)	2014	—	—	non-album singles
"IM5's Fancy" (with IM5)	2014	—	—	non-album singles
"Monsterbia" (with IM5)	2014	—	—	non-album singles
"Evolution of JB" (with IM5)	2014	—	—	non-album singles
"Cell Block Django"	2014	—	—	non-album singles
"Low" (solo or featuring RuPaul) (Note: "Low" (Remix) is included on the deluxe edition of Straight Outta Oz.)	2015	34	—	non-album singles
"Defying Gravity"	2017	—	—	non-album singles
"Ordinary Day" (featuring Nick Rashad Burroughs)	2018	—	—	Forbidden
"Dem Beats" (featuring RuPaul)	2018	—	55	Forbidden
"Warning"	2018	—	—	non-album single
"Glitter"	2019	—	—	Haus Party, Pt. 1
"Nails, Hair, Hips, Heels" (solo or featuring Ciara)	2019	21	35	Haus Party, Pt. 1 and Haus Party, Pt. 2
"I Like Boys"	2019	40	—	Haus Party, Pt. 1
"Wig"	2019	49	—	Haus Party, Pt. 2
"Fag"	2019	—	—	Haus Party, Pt. 2
"Dripeesha" (featuring Tiffany Haddish)	2019	—	—	Haus Party, Pt. 2
"Magic Happens"	2020	—	—	non-album single
"Mask, Gloves, Soap, Scrubs"	2020	—	—	Quarantine Queen
"Bells, Bows, Gifts, Trees"	2020	30	—	non-album single
"Boys in the Ocean"	2021	—	—	Femuline
"Rainin' Fellas"	2021	—	—	Femuline
"Dance Forever"	2022	—	—	Algorhythm
"Pre Madonna"	2022	—	—	Algorhythm
"Breath"	2022	—	—	Algorhythm

=== As featured artist ===
Title	Year	Peak chart positions	Album
Title	Year	US Dance/ Electronic Digital	Album
"Used to Love Me" (Kandi featuring Todrick Hall)	2020	22	TBA

== Other charted songs ==
Title	Year	Peak chart positions	Album
Title	Year	US Dance/ Electronic	Album
"Attention"	2020	40	Haus Party, Pt. 1
"Werk Out"	2021	— (Note: "Werk Out" did not enter the Dance/Electronic Songs chart, but did peak at number 8 on the Dance/Electronic Digital Song Sales chart.)	Quarantine Queen

== Other appearances ==
Song	Year	Other artist(s)	Album
"The Fish Song"	2012	—N/a	Cousins: The Songs of Beck & May
"Deck the Halls"	2015	RuPaul	Slay Belles
"The Chicken Song"	2016	Jay Armstrong Johnson	Live at Feinstein's/54 Below
"I'm Gonna Wash That Man Right Outta My Life"	2018	Billy Porter	Billy Porter Presents the Soul of Richard Rogers
"Pitch Perfect Franchise Medley"	2018	—N/a	Pitch Perfect 3 (Original Motion Picture Soundtrack) [Special Edition]
"Kingdom"	2019	—N/a	Step Up: High Water, Season 2 (Original Soundtrack)
