= Ailsa Davidson =

Scottish actress

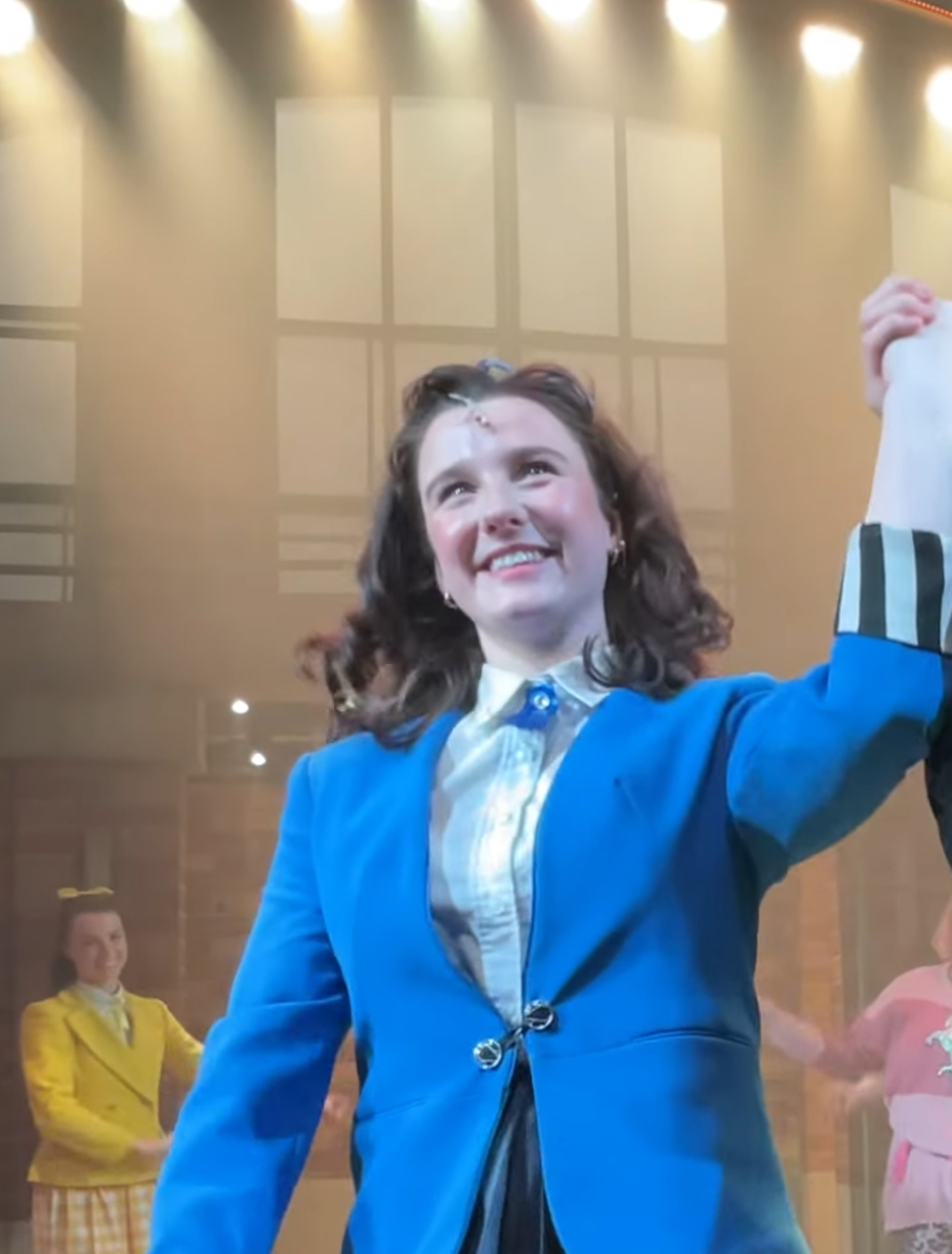
Davidson in 2022

Ailsa Davidson (born 28 August 1993) is a Scottish actress. She is best known for playing Veronica Sawyer in the Pro-Shot of Heathers: The Musical and Marie Curie in Marie Curie: a New Musical.

== Early life and education ==
Davidson was born in Aberdeen, Scotland. She graduated from Guildford School of Acting in 2015.

== Career ==
Davidson joined the cast of the UK tour of Grease, as Miss Lynch (and first cover Rizzo/second cover Jan) in 2017. The cast also included Danielle Hope as Sandy and Tom Parker as Danny.

Davidson joined the cast of Heathers: The Musical in 2021, playing Veronica Sawyer alongside Emma Kingston as Heather Chandler and Freddie King as JD. The show was directed by Andy Fickman, was then recorded for film release with Davidson reprising her role, joined by Simon Gordon as Jason "J.D" Dean, Maddison Firth as Heather Chandler, Vivian Panka as Heather Duke and Teleri Hughes as Heather McNamara.

In 2024 Davidson starred as Marie Curie in Marie Curie: a New Musical at the Charing Cross Theatre. The show debuted in South Korea in 2020 with book and lyrics by Seeun Choun and music by Jongyoon Choi and was adapted in English by Tom Ramsay.

Davidson joined the cast of Midnight, a new musical by Todrick Hall, in November 2025 as Scarlet. The cast for the workshop production also included Hall, in the lead role of Rail, Jeremy Beloate as Richard, Charlotte Odusanya as Lily Rose, Charlotte Jaconelli as Violet, Georgina Onuorah as Happy, Barney Wilkinson as Harry, Ashlee Irish as Clyde, Rachel Tucker as Charlotte, Watkins Smith Jr as Billy and Craig Armstrong as Sylvester.

In March 2026 Davidson was part of the musical In Pieces as Sam, at The Other Palace The show was presented during three performances, after successful presentations in the US.

=== Theatre ===
Year	Title	Role	Theatre	Category	Ref.
2015	Our House	Sarah	Union Theatre	Off-West End	
2017	Grease	Miss Lynch, first cover Rizzo, second cover Jan	UK tour	UK tour	
2019	Lipsync		Edinburgh Fringe	Regional	
2021-2022	Heathers: The Musical	Veronica Sawyer	The Other Palace	Off-West End	
2024	Marie Curie: a New Musical	Marie Curie	Charing Cross Theatre	Off-West End	
2025	Midnight	Scarlet	Sadler's Wells East	Off-West End	
2026	In Pieces	Sam	The Other Palace	Off-West End	
2026	Titanique	Rose	Criterion Theatre	West End	

=== Television ===
Year	Title	Role	Notes
2022	Heathers: The Musical	Veronica Sawyer	filmed at The Other Palace
2024	Halo	Tech Smith	3 episodes
2025	Outlander: Blood of My Blood	Janet MacKenzie	3 episodes
