= Charlotte Jaconelli (singer) =

British singer and actress

Charlotte Jaconelli (born 24 August) is an English singer and actress. She is best known for participating in Britain's Got Talent in 2012 aged 16, as part of the classical duo Jonathan and Charlotte.

== Early life and education ==
Jaconelli is originally from Chigwell, Essex. Her father is Italian from San Biagio. Jaconelli studied at West Hatch High School and was coached by singing teacher Jenny Ewington. She then trained and graduated in musical theatre at the Arts Educational Schools in London.

== Career ==
=== Television and Music ===
In 2012 Jaconelli auditioned for TV talent show Britain's Got Talent with classmate Jonathan Antoine, as Jonathan and Charlotte, with the song "The Prayer", originally sung by Celine Dion and Andrea Bocelli. The duo ended second in the competition and soon after released their first album, Together.

In February 2014 the duo split to pursue their solo careers. Jaconelli released her first album, Solitaire, in June 2014.

Track list:

1. Feels Like Home
2. Solitaire
3. Requiem: Pie Jesu
4. I Know Him So Well - with Kerry Ellis
5. When She Loved Me
6. Right Here Waiting
7. Lascia ch'io pianga
8. All I Ask of You - with Daniel Koek
9. On My Own
10. I Dreamt I Dwelt in Marble Halls
11. I Could Have Danced All Night

=== Stage ===
Jaconelli was part of the cast of Sweet Charity at the Donmar Warehouse in 2019, starring Arthur Darvill and Anne-Marie Duff.

In 2022 Jaconelli joined the Theatre Royal, Bath cast of Into the Woods, directed by Terry Gilliam, as Florinda. Also in the cast Julian Bleach, Audrey Brisson as Cinderella, Nicola Hughes as the Witch, Rhashan Stone and Alex Young.

In August 2023 Jaconelli played Joanna in Jamie Lloyd's Sunset Boulevard at the Savoy Theatre. The show was led by Nicole Scherzinger in the role of Norma Desmond, with Rachel Tucker, playing Norma at certain performances.

Jaconelli played Queenie in the 2025 musical version of Burlesque, directed and choreographed by Todrick Hall. The show opened in Manchester in 2024 and had a summer run at London's Savoy Theatre in 2025.

In November 2025 Jaconelli was part of the cast of Midnight, a new musical by Todrick Hall, that ran at the Sadler's Wells East for a week. She was also associate director alongside Hall, who starred, directed and choreographed. Hall played the lead role of Rail, alongside Jeremy Beloate as Richard, Charlotte Odusanya as Lily Rose, Ailsa Davidson as Scarlet, Georgina Onuorah as Happy, Barney Wilkinson as Harry, Ashlee Irish as Clyde, Watkins Smith Jr as Billy, Craig Armstrong as Sylvester and Rachel Tucker as Charlotte.

Year	Title	Role	Theatre	Category	Ref.
2015	She Loves Me	Amalia Balash	Landor Theatre	Off West End	
2019	Sweet Charity	Ensemble	Donmar Warehouse	West End	
2022	The Wizard of Oz		Leicester Curve	Regional	
2022	Into the Woods	Florinda	Theatre Royal Bath	Regional	
2023	Sunset Boulevard	Joanna / Masseur	Savoy Theatre	West End	
2025	Burlesque	Queenie	Savoy Theatre	West End	
2025	Midnight	Violet	Sadler's Wells East	Off West End, also Assistant Director	

=== Filmography ===
Year	Title	Role	Notes
2013	The Johnny and Inel Show	Self - singer	TV show (1 episode)
2014	The National Lottery: In it to Win It	Self	TV show (1 episode)
2022	Call the Midwife	Mrs Pembridge	TV series (1 episode)
