= House Party =

A house party is a social gathering at someone's residence.

House Party may also refer to:

== Film ==
- House Party (1990 film), a hip hop comedy starring recording artists Kid 'n Play
  - House Party 2, a 1991 sequel
  - House Party 3, a 1994 sequel
  - House Party 4: Down to the Last Minute, a 2001 sequel
  - House Party: Tonight's the Night, a 2013 sequel
- House Party (2023 film), an American comedy film, based on the 1990 film

== Television ==
- House Party (Canadian TV series), a 1954–1955 talk show
- House Party (radio and TV show), a 1945–1967 show, colloquially called Art Linkletter's House Party
- House Party (2008 Canadian TV series), a 2008 Canadian comedy series
- ECW House Party, a 1996–1999 professional wrestling event
- "House Party" (Saved by the Bell), a 1990 episode
- "House Party", an episode of SpongeBob SquarePants
- "House Party", a 2009 episode of True Jackson, VP

== Literature ==
- A House Party, a 1887 novel by Ouida
- House Party, a 1992 novel by Katherine Applegate under the pseudonym L.E. Blair, the 23rd installment in the Girl Talks series
- House Party, a 2006 novel by Alice Alfonsi, the 17th book based on the television series That's So Raven
- House Party, a 2007 novel by Eric Walters

== Music ==
=== Albums ===
- House Party (Jimmy Smith album), 1958
- House Party (The Temptations album), 1975
- Houseparty (Little Willie Littlefield album), 1982
- House Party (soundtrack), from the 1990 film

=== Songs ===
- "House Party" (Sam Hunt song), 2015
- "House Party" (Meek Mill song), 2011
- "House Party" (3OH!3 song), 2010
- "House Party" (Super Junior song), 2021
- "House Party", a 2024 song by Ayesha Erotica
- "Houseparty" (Annalisa song), 2020
- "Ain't Nothin' But a House Party", a Showstoppers and J. Geils Band song, 1967

== Other ==
- House Party (video game), a 2017 adventure simulation video game
- House Party, Inc. (established in 2005), an American marketing company
- Houseparty (app), a 2016 mobile app
- Rent party, a Jazz Age party thrown to pay rent on a house

== See also ==
- Haus Party, Pt. 1, a 2019 EP by Todrick Hall
  - Haus Party, Pt. 2, 2019
  - Haus Party, Pt. 3, 2020
- Noel's House Party, a 1990s UK TV show
- Regency House Party, a 2004 British historical reality television series
- Adam DeVine's House Party, a 2013 TV show
- Housewarming party
