= Grim (musical) =

- A New Musical
- Original Poster
- Music: Joseph Alexander
- Lyrics: Fiona O'Malley
- Premiere: 20 July 2014: Rose Theatre, Kingston
- Productions: July 2014, Rose Theatre, Kingston; August 2014, Charing Cross Theatre

Grim, also known as Grim: A New Musical or Grim - The Love Story To Die For, is a musical with music by Joseph Alexander and lyrics/book by Fiona O'Malley, of The Untold Theatre Company. It premiered at the Rose Theatre, Kingston on 20 July 2014.

Set in a high school, the musical is about when the two greatest forces in the world, love (Cupid) and death (Grim), meet. The two fall in love, but if Grim is with him, it will lead to his demise.

== Production history ==
The musical was produced by The Untold Theatre Company, which is run by Adam Wollerton and Fiona O'Malley, and received £14,500 from Arts Council England, via the local authority Kingston upon Thames on 17 June 2014, to help get it started. The musical had four performances at The Rose Theatre as part of the International Youth Arts Festival (IYAF), before moving to the Charing Cross Theatre for a month's run. The Original London Cast Recording was released on 20 July 2014.

Both productions of the musical had mainly the same cast and crew. It was directed by Adam Wollerton, with Joshua Whatsize as assistant director. There were two choreographers: Sam Lathwood and Adam Jay-Price. Set and costume design was done by Anna Driftmier, with lighting design by Jack Weir. After the performances at The Rose Theatre, Jordan Veloso was cast as Matthew.

On his official website, composer Joseph Alexander stated: "This is only the beginning of the journey for Grim. I hope to cross paths again with all these individuals, whether that's on future theatre productions or Grim itself". As of December 2015, they have been no further performances of Grim.

== Cast ==
Character	Original London Cast
Grim	Roseanna Christoforou
Cupid	Anthony Matteo
Amelia	Georgi Mottram
Matthew	Jamie Leeke
Cherry	Kathryn Rutherford
Sabrina	Rhiannon Drake
Ruby	Louisa Cameron
Isabella	Izzy Roy
Teacher	Karina Toolan

== Reception ==
Professional ratings
Review scores
Source	Rating
What's On Stage	3/5 stars
Entertainment Focus	2/5 stars
The Upcoming	2/5 stars
BroadwayBaby.com	3/5 stars
West End Frame	2/5 stars
PlaysToSee.com	1/5 stars
PicklepantsReviews.com	5/5 stars

Grim received mixed reviews from critics, with the general census showing that although an enjoyable show, more work on the musical itself was needed.

WhatsOnStage.com writes, "the piece is cleverly plotted by writer Fiona O'Malley, who links Grim's persecution to the witch trials of the sixteenth century." Entertainment Focus comments on the book, saying, "the book is stuffed full of tired clichés... The characters are also painfully one-dimensional." However, they do complement the cast, writing, "The young cast is talented, with a strong ensemble nailing some impressive harmonies." Indeed, Terry Eastham of LondonTheatre1.com also gave a very positive review, commenting, "The production itself was excellent. From the silent hooded figures standing at the side of the auditorium as we walked in, through to the end, I thoroughly enjoyed myself. All of the songs were great (I’m listening to the soundtrack on Spotify as I write this) and delivered by an extremely strong and talented cast whose voices, particularly in the duets, complemented each other wonderfully." The Upcoming labels it as having, " a pretty score and fine performances from the principal actors," but picks up on the storyline, saying, "the bleak subject matter may limit the show’s appeal." British Theatre Guide described the music as "an unusual amalgam of electro-acoustic pop and operatic ideas", whilst BroadwayBaby.com writes "composer Joseph Alexander’s original soundtrack carries the show along well... a particularly lovely number entitled She Said Yes that will leave you beaming in your seat. PlaysToSee.com gave the musical a negative review, writing, "However, the show's lushly romantic score scans, rhymes, and is metrically perfect. The lyrics are not, and come across as incompetent, no matter how bravely this talented cast try to make them work."
