= Georgina Onuorah =

British actress

- Born: Luton
- Education: Arts Educational Schools
- Years active: 2020–present

Georgina Onuorah is a British actress, singer and dancer who is best known for playing Ado Annie in Oklahoma! and Dorothy in the 2024 version of The Wizard of Oz.

== Early life and education ==
Onuorah was born in Luton. She completed sixth form at Emil Dale Academy. She was the recipient of the 2017 Andrew Lloyd Webber Foundation scholarship, going on to graduate with a Bachelor of Arts (BA) in Musical Theatre from the Arts Educational School in London in 2020.

== Career ==
Onuorah made her professional debut in 2020 in the National Theatre production of Dick Whittington, in the role of Alice. This was the National Theatre second attempt at a panto and was recorded at its last performance, ahead of theatre closing because of COVID-19.

In 2021 Onuorah was cast as alternate Cinderella in Andrew Lloyd Webber's Bad Cinderella (later renamed Cinderella), sharing the role with Carrie Hope Fletcher.

In 2022 she played Dorothy in The Wizard of Oz at the Curve Theatre in Leicester. She then reprised the role at the London Palladium in the summer of 2023, after her performance in Oklahoma!.

Onuorah took over the role of Ado Annie from Marisha Wallace for the transfer of Oklahoma! to London's West End in 2023, after ending its run at the Young Vic. Part of the cast were Arthur Darvill as Curly, Anoushka Lucas as Laurey and Patrick Vaill as Jud.

In February 2024 it was announced that Onuorah would star in Kiss Me, Kate at the Barbican Theatre as Lois in the summer, alongside Stephanie J. Block in the titular role and Charlie Stemp as Bill. The production was directed by Tony Award winner Bartlett Sher and Catherine Zuber as the costume designer.

Around the same time in 2024 Onuorah was also revealed to take over the role of Angelica Schuyler in Hamilton from Ava Brennan, going on maternity leave, for a short engagement ahead of her summer show.

In October 2024 she was part of the concert Sondheim on Sondheim at the Alexandra Palace Theatre, where she sang alongside West End stars Jenna Russell, Scarlett Strallen and Clive Rowe.

From December 2024 to January 2025 she played Audrey in the Sheffield Theatres revival of Little Shop of Horrors.

In January 2025, it was announced that Onuorah would be playing the role of Lulu in the European premiere of Shucked at the Regent’s Park Open Air Theatre from May until June 2025. She then returned to the Open Air Theatre from August to September 2025 in Brigadoon, sharing the lead role of Fiona McLaren with Danielle Fiamanya.

In January-February 2026 Onuorah was part of the cast of All Is But Fantasy by the Royal Shakespeare Company (RSC), created and directed by Whitney White. The show brings together Shakespearean material, contemporary storytelling and live music across two parts and featured Juliette Crosbie as Desdemona and Juliet, Daniel Krikler as Man, Renée Lamb as First Witch, Timmika Ramsay as Third Witch and Whitney White as Woman.

== Stage ==
Year	Title	Role	Theatre	Category	Ref.
2020	Dick Whittington	Alice Fitzwarren	National Theatre, Olivier	West End	
2021 - 2022	Bad Cinderella	Alternate Cinderella	Gillian Lynne Theatre	West End	
2022	Millennials	Yas Queen	The Other Palace	West End	
2022 - 2023	The Wizard of Oz	Dorothy	Leicester Curve	Regional	
2023	Oklahoma!	Ado Annie	Wyndham's Theatre	West End	
2023	The Wizard of Oz	Dorothy	London Palladium	West End	
2024, 2026 - 2027	Hamilton	Angelica Schuyler	Victoria Palace Theatre	West End	
2024	Kiss Me, Kate	Lois	Barbican Theatre	West End	
2024 - 2025	Little Shop of Horrors	Audrey	Crucible Theatre	Regional	
2025	Shucked	Lulu	Regent’s Park Open Air Theatre	Off West End	
2025	Brigadoon	Fiona McLaren	Regent’s Park Open Air Theatre	Off West End	
2025	Midnight	Happy	Sadler's Wells East	Off West End	
2026	All Is But Fantasy	Second Witch	The Other Palace	Regional	

== Awards and nominations ==
Year	Work	Award	Category	Result	Notes
2021	n/a	Black British Theatre Awards	Best Recent Graduate	Nominated	
2025	Shucked	Black British Theatre Awards	Best Female Lead Actor in a Musical	Nominated	
2026	Shucked	Laurence Olivier Awards	Best Actress in a Supporting Role in a Musical	Nominated	
2026	Brigadoon	Laurence Olivier Awards	Best Actress in a Musical	Nominated	(Note: Joint nomination with Danielle Fiamanya.)
