= Marisha Wallace =

American actress and singer (born 1985)

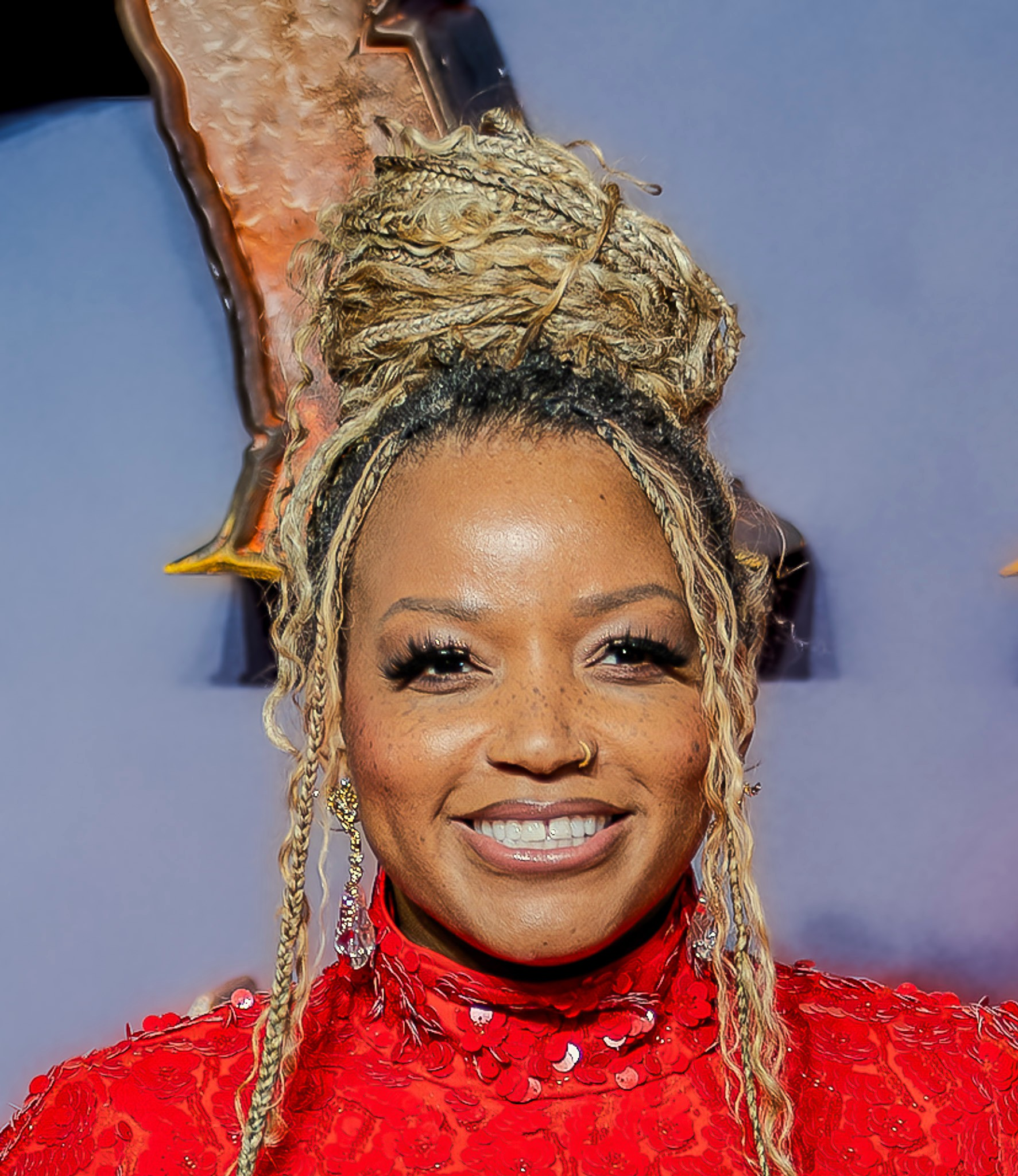
- Wallace in 2025
- Born: September 29, 1985 (age 41); United States
- Citizenship: United States; United Kingdom (from 2025)
- Occupations: Actress; singer
- Years active: 2014–present

Marisha Wallace (born September 29, 1985) is an American-British actress and singer, best known for her work in musical theatre.

== Life and career ==
Wallace grew up on a hog farm in Goldsboro, North Carolina.

Wallace appeared in the original Broadway casts of Aladdin (2014) and Something Rotten! (2015) as a member of the ensemble and understudy. In January 2017 she became an alternate Effie White in the West End production of Dreamgirls. Following the departure of Amber Riley from the production, Wallace took over the role, sharing with Karen Mav and Moya Angela. In 2017, she released a Christmas album called Soul Holiday.

In 2019, she joined the original London cast of Waitress as Becky. In Summer 2021 she starred in the London Coliseum production of Hairspray as Motormouth Maybelle opposite Michael Ball. For this role she was nominated for the 2021 Black British Theatre Awards as Best Female Actress in a Musical.

In 2022, she played Ado Annie in Oklahoma! at the Young Vic, a performance for which she received an Olivier Award nomination for Best Actress in a Supporting Role in a Musical.

Wallace is the singing voice of Ms Johnston in Jingle Jangle: A Christmas Journey on Netflix.

In March 2023, she began playing Miss Adelaide in Guys and Dolls at the Bridge Theatre for which she was nominated for her second Olivier Award Nomination for Best Actress in a Musical. She left the production in February 2024.

In March 2024, Wallace entered the Celebrity Big Brother house to compete in the twenty-third series. She was the fifth housemate evicted, leaving on Day 16 in a double eviction.

In August 2024, she appeared in a concert staging of Something Rotten! at Theatre Royal, Drury Lane.

In September 2024, she made a special guest appearance during concerts by Alex Newell at Cadogan Hall. In December 2024, she made her debut in pantomime as the Sheriff of Nottingham in Robin Hood at the London Palladium.

Between January and May 2025, she starred in Cabaret at the Playhouse Theatre as Sally Bowles, alongside Billy Porter as The Emcee. From July to October 2025, she was set to reprise her role opposite Porter in the final cast of the Broadway revival of Cabaret at the August Wilson Theatre. The production was cut short, with the last show date in September 2025.

On 11 March 2025, she played a solo concert at the Adelphi Theatre in London. A recording of this concert was eventually released as the album Live in London which released on 15 August 2025.

On 24 April 2025, she received her British citizenship.

== Stage ==
Year	Title	Role	Notes
2010	Rent	Maureen Johnson	Palace Theatre
2011	Rent	Joanne Jefferson	Broadway Palm Theatre
2012	The Book of Mormon	Ensemble	US Tour
2014–2015	Aladdin	Ensemble u/s Babkak	New Amsterdam Theatre, Broadway
2015	Something Rotten!	Ensemble u/s Bea	St. James Theatre, Broadway
2016	Dreamgirls	Effie White	Savoy Theatre, West End
2019	Waitress	Becky	Adelphi Theatre, West End
2021	Hairspray	Motormouth Maybelle	London Coliseum, West End
2022	Oklahoma!	Ado Annie	Young Vic Theatre, London
2023–2024	Guys and Dolls	Miss Adelaide	Bridge Theatre, London
2024	Something Rotten! in Concert	Bea	Theatre Royal Drury Lane, West End
2024	Robin Hood	Sheriff of Nottingham	London Palladium, West End
2025	Cabaret	Sally Bowles	Playhouse Theatre, West End
2025	Cabaret	Sally Bowles	August Wilson Theatre, Broadway
2026	Once On This Island in Concert	Erzulie	Theatre Royal, Drury Lane, West End
2026	Midnight	Happy	Sadler's Wells East, London
2026	Something Rotten!	Bea	Manchester Opera House, Manchester
2026	Table 17	Jada	Kiln Theatre, London

== Filmography ==
Film
Year	Title	Role	Ref.
2019	Aladdin	Busybody Woman	

As herself
Year	Title	Role	Ref.
2021	Feel Good	Marsha; season 2 (2 episodes)	
2024	Celebrity Big Brother	Housemate; series 23	

== Discography ==
=== Albums ===
List of albums, with selected details and chart positions
Title	Details	Peak chart positions
Title	Details	UK
Soul Holiday	Released: October 26, 2017; Labels: Self-released; Format: Digital download	—
TOMORROW	Released: November 27, 2020; Labels: Decca; Format: Digital download, streaming	69
Live in London	Released: August 15, 2025; Labels: Westway Music; Format: Digital download, streaming, CD	—

=== Singles ===
Title	Year	Album
"Fight Like a Woman (Slay)"	2019	Non-album singles
"The Beginning"	2020	Non-album singles
"Tomorrow"	2020	Tomorrow
"Maybe This Time (Live Edit)"	2025	Live in London
"And I Am Telling You (Live)"	2025	Live in London
“Cabaret (Live)"	2025	Live in London

== Awards and nominations ==
Year	Work	Award	Category	Result	Ref.
2020	Waitress	WhatsOnStage Award	Best Supporting Actress in a Musical	Nominated	
2023	Oklahoma!	Olivier Awards	Best Actress in a Supporting Role in a Musical	Nominated	
2023	Oklahoma!	WhatsOnStage Award	Best Supporting Performer in a Musical	Nominated	
2024	Guys and Dolls	WhatsOnStage Award	Best Performer in a Musical	Nominated	
2024	Guys and Dolls	Olivier Awards	Best Actress in a Musical	Nominated	
