= Quarantine Queen =

EP by Todrick Hall
- Released: April 29, 2020
- Recorded: April 20–27, 2020
- Length: 18:35
- Label: Self-released
- Producer: Todrick Hall

Todrick Hall chronology
Haus Party, Pt. 2 (2019)	Quarantine Queen (2020)	Haus Party, Pt. 3 (2021)

Singles from Quarantine Queen
- 1. "Mask, Gloves, Soap, Scrubs" Released: April 29, 2020

Quarantine Queen is the fourth extended play by American singer-songwriter, actor, and YouTuber Todrick Hall. Inspired by the COVID-19 pandemic, the album was written, recorded, and produced by Hall in the week leading up to its release on April 29, 2020. A music video was released for "Mask, Gloves, Soap, Scrubs" the same day.

== Composition ==
The EP features six songs about life in the age of COVID-19. The first track is "Mas(k)ot", a spoof on "Bootylicious" by Destiny's Child that calls out all the events that have been cancelled because of the virus. It features a cheerleading theme and features Jerry Harris from the Netflix series Cheer. "Tiktok" is about the app of the same name. "Meow" is about the television program Tiger King, notable for its popularity during the pandemic. "Mask, Gloves, Soap, Scrubs", is a parody of Hall's song "Nails, Hair, Hips, Heels" from Haus Party, Pt. 1

Following the arrest of Jerry Harris in September 2020 for allegedly soliciting sex from minors, the track Mas(k)ot was removed from all streaming platforms and download stores.

== Track listing ==
All tracks are written by and produced by Todrick Hall

No.	Title	Length
1.	"Mas(k)ot" (featuring Jerry Harris)	2:56
2.	"Werk Out"	3:32
3.	"Rent"	2:55
4.	"Tiktok"	2:07
5.	"Meow" (featuring Rhea Litre)	3:04
6.	"Mask, Gloves, Soap, Scrubs"	3:58
Total length:		18:35
