= A Little in Love =

"A Little in Love" may refer to:

- "A Little in Love" (Cliff Richard song), 1981 song by Cliff Richard
- "A Little in Love" (Paul Brandt song), 1997 song by Paul Brandt
- "A Little in Love", 2021 song by Todrick Hall from Haus Party, Pt. 3
