= Dumbshow Theatre Company =

Dumbshow are a London-based theatre company composed of actors, musicians, writers, dancers and designers.

Mark Radcliffe, of BBC Radio 2, labelled them “fabulous" and "so visually inventive." In 2010 Lyn Gardner described them in a review as "a fledgling company who may yet soar" and included them in The Guardian Guide's 'Pick of the Week.'

Dumbshow began life at the University of Warwick in 2006 where their shows were performed in the Warwick Arts Centre Studio Theatre; they have since grown to become a company of professional performers and writers. Dumbshow has performed at a wide variety of venues and theatre festivals across the UK, including Manchester's Royal Exchange, the Edinburgh Fringe, the Stafford Gatehouse and London's Cochrane Theatre. In July 2011 they will be performing as part of the International Youth Arts Festival at the Rose Theatre in Kingston-Upon-Thames before taking three shows up to C Venues at the Edinburgh Fringe. Two new shows will be added to Dumbshow's repertory at the festival, the new play Roar and a retelling of Sophocles’ ancient myth, Oedipus: A Love Story.
