= West Hatch High School =

School in Chigwell, Essex, England

Location
- High Road; Chigwell, Essex, IG7 5BT; United Kingdom; 51°36′45″N 0°03′47″E

Information
- Type: Academy
- Motto: The Best That I Can Be - Manu et Mente (By Hand and By Mind)
- Religious affiliation: None (Secular)
- Established: 1957; 69 years ago
- Department for Education URN: 136758 Tables
- Ofsted: Reports
- Headteacher: Victoria Schaefer
- Deputy Head: Anthony Sinfield
- Staff: 81 full time
- Gender: Coeducational
- Age: 11 to 18
- Enrolment: 1258
- Houses: Austen, Brunel, Fiennes, Newton, Roddick
- Website: https://www.westhatch.net

West Hatch High School is a secondary school located in Chigwell, Epping Forest, Essex (near Woodford Bridge). The area, now currently occupied by West Hatch, was previously the western gate (or hatch as it would have been known) into Hainault Forest; it is from these roots that the school derives its name. The school currently educates 1,300 students from the local catchment area, and nearly 200 sixth-form pupils from northeast London and west Essex.

== History ==
The school was built in 1957 as a four-storied building with glazing on all sides on Chigwell High Road by Richard Sheppard & Partners with the Essex county architect, H. Conolly.

The school was awarded 'business and enterprise specialist school' status in 2002.

== Facilities ==
The grounds have been renovated on numerous occasions, developing the many-acre site into seven main teaching buildings. West Hatch has undergone major renovations, including a Maths Dining & Drama Block (1999), Ruby Theatre (2000, built by students attaining Gold The Duke of Edinburgh Award Status), Sixth Form Centre (2000), Music Suite (2002), Business and Enterprise Block (2003), Science block, Design and Technology block and the 4-storey classroom block, which has overall resulted in it being a more modernised and well-equipped school.

Renovation of the ICT infrastructure has enabled evening classes and Microsoft Digital Literacy training for parents using a parent portal. A new swimming pool, replacing one that was fifty years old, was opened in 2010, named the Race Pool after a former teacher. A sports hall and classroom block were built as an extension to the school and opened in 2021. One of the buildings was named Howarth Hall, after Frances Howarth who was headteacher of West Hatch for over 18 years. Howarth returned to the school to inaugurate the building.

== Notable former pupils ==
- Jonathan Antoine and Charlotte Jaconelli – Britain's Got Talent finalists
- Vicki Michelle – actress
- Ann Michelle - actress
- Sally Gunnell – Olympic gold medallist
- Kate Silverton – BBC newsreader
- Mark Wallinger – artist
- Joey Essex – reality TV personality
- Richard Jones – Britain's Got Talent winner
- Nancy Sorrell – model, actress, television presenter
- Sonny Jay - Capital Breakfast host and Britain’s Got Talent finalist
- Stephen Knight - journalist, author
