= Nails, Hair, Hips, Heels =

2019 single by Todrick Hall

- Ciara remix cover

Single by Todrick Hall

from the EP Haus Party, Pt. 1
- Released: May 23, 2019
- Genre: Dance-pop; hip house
- Length: 3:35
- Label: Planet Hype
- Songwriters: Kofi Owusu-Ofori; Jean-Yves Ducornet; Carl Seanté McGrier; Todrick Hall
- Producers: Jeeves; Wiidope; Todrick Hall

Todrick Hall singles chronology
"Glitter" (2019)	"Nails, Hair, Hips, Heels" (2019)	"I Like Boys" (2019)

"Nails, Hair, Hips, Heels" is a song by Todrick Hall, released in May 23, 2019, as the second single from his EP, Haus Party, Pt. 1, which was released on the same day.

== Composition ==
Gay Star News' Anya Crittenton described "Nails, Hair, Hips, Heels" as a "rhythmic bop" song. The song ends with a series of requested actions, asking listeners to drop, tongue pop, twirl, say "girl", and "shablam". The news website's David Hudson described the song as a "gay anthem".

Hall has said the song is his favorite on the EP.

== Music video ==
The music video for "Nails, Hair, Hips, Heels" features Hall and other dancers performing a choreography while wearing high heels and gloves in an empty warehouse with an illuminated pink triangle in the background.

The song's music video features a group of men performing choreographed dancing in high heels and gloves in teams of different colors (pink, purple, orange, blue, and teal). Among the dancers is Chester Lockhart. The video was filmed in an empty warehouse and features an illuminated pink triangle in the background.

=== Reception ===
The music video received more than 3 million views by early June 2019.

Dave Stewart of CBC News said the music video "has become a bit of a YouTube sensation" and opined, "Not hard to see/hear why." Anya Crittenton of Gay Star News said the song was "begging to be danced to and blasted at all the Pride celebrations coming up", and wrote, "The end of the song is a series of repeated demands that people are sure to have fun with when the song becomes a mainstay of parties and clubs alike."

== Critical reception ==
Devin Randall is Instinct called the song "sensational". In a review of the EP, Instinct published: "'Nails Hair Hips Heels' is a bitch track in the absolute best sense of the word. With razor sharp lyrics presented gorgeously by a sultry sounding Hall, this track, in the same vein as 'Dem Beats' gives you lyrics chock full of immediately trend setting verses." Billboard's Jon Ali said the song has "comedy, camp and catchphrases galore", and included the track in his "Queer Necessities: Billboard Pride's June 2019 Playlist. Cynthia Erivo, Janelle Monáe, and Billy Porter all praised the song online.

== Chart performance ==
The song reached number 27 on Billboard's Hot Dance/Electronic Songs chart. "Nails, Hair, Hips, Heels" received 480,000 US streams and 2,000 purchased downloads for the week ending May 30, 2019.

== Remixes ==
On August 19, 2019, Hall released an official remix of the song featuring American singer Ciara. The remix was later included on Haus Party, Pt. 2, along with a remix by Israeli producer Sagi Kariv.

On April 29, 2020, Hall released "Mask, Gloves, Soap, Scrubs", a COVID-19 themed parody as the first single from his EP Quarantine Queen.

Hall released a Christmas-oriented version of the song, titled "Bells, Bows, Gifts, Trees" on December 1, 2020.

Hall also released a new version of the song for Ubisoft's Just Dance 2022, with the lyrics rewritten to reflect the Just Dance franchise. Both this version and the original clean radio edit were included as separate routines within the game, with Hall appearing as a dance coach in both routines.

== Charts ==
=== Weekly charts ===
Chart (2019)	Peak position
US Dance Club Songs (Billboard)	35
US Hot Dance/Electronic Songs (Billboard)	21

=== Year-end charts ===
Chart (2019)	Position
US Hot Dance/Electronic Songs (Billboard)	65

=== Bells, Bows, Gifts, Trees ===
Chart (2020)	Peak position
US Hot Dance/Electronic Songs (Billboard)	30
