= Mandela (musical) =

2022 musical

- A Revolutionary Musical
- Official promo art for 2022 production
- Music: Greg Dean Borowsky; Shaun Borowsky
- Lyrics: Greg Dean Borowsky; Shaun Borowsky
- Book: Laiona Michelle
- Basis: The life of Nelson Mandela
- Premiere: 8 December 2022: Young Vic, London
- Productions: 2022 London

Mandela is a musical based on the life of Nelson Mandela, with music and lyrics by Greg Dean Borowsky and Shaun Borowsky, and a book by Laiona Michelle.

== Productions ==
Mandela began previews at the Young Vic Theatre, London on 30 November 2022, with an opening night on 8 December. It played a limited run to February 4, 2023. A large number of performances were cancelled due to unprecedented levels of illness. Cast member Adam Pearce suffered a stroke following a performance, which attracted wide-spread coverage of a fundraiser to aide his recovery. Despite mixed critical reception, the production sold out the performances it played. Mandela had direction by Schele Williams and choreography by Gregory Maqoma, with additional music & lyrics by Bongi Duma. Hannah Beachler served as scenic designer, with costume design by Fay Fullerton and lighting design by Jon Clark. Sound design was by Paul Gatehouse, with projection design by Akhila Krishnan. Orchestrations were by Sam Young, and Sean Mayes served as musical director for the production.

== Cast and characters ==
Character	2022 London
Nelson Mandela	Michael Luwoye
Winnie Mandela	Danielle Fiamanya
Vusi	Gregory Armand
Bongani	Zion Battles
Prime Minister	Earl Carpenter
Warden	Stewart Clarke
Nomsa	Hanna Dimtsu
Adelaide Tambo/Evelyn Mase	Lerato Gwebu
Praise Singer	Prudence Jezile
Walter Sisulu	Akmed Junior Khemalai
Gugu	Blue Makawana
Susan/Erika	Kayleigh McKnight
Thembi Mandela	Posi Morakinyo
Albertina Sisulu/Maki Mandela	Sneziey Msomi
Zeni Mandela	Nomfusi Ngonyama
Joe Slovo	Ryan O'Donnell
Kobus	Adam Pierce
Kgatho Mandela	Botlhale Phora
Ahmed Kathrada	Shiv Rabheru
Piet	Will Richardson
Zindzi Mandela	Leanne Robinson
Oliver Tambo	Ntsikelelo Nicholas Vani
