= 2020 Black British Theatre Awards =

2020 theatrical awards ceremony

The Black British Theatre Awards (BBTA) were launched in 2019 to recognise excellence among black performers and creatives in the UK.

The 2020 Black British Theatre Awards winners and nominees were:

Best Play	Best Musical
Death of a Salesman at the Piccadilly Theatre; Fairview at the Young Vic; Three Sisters at the National Theatre	Thriller – Live at the Lyric Theatre; Hamilton at the Victoria Palace Theatre; TINA - The Tina Turner Musical at the Aldwych Theatre
Best Male Actor in a Play	Best Male Actor in a Musical
Valentine Olukoga in The Fishermen at the Trafalgar Studios; Lucian Msamati in 'Master Harold'... and the boys at the National Theatre; Paapa Essiedu in Pass Over at the Kiln Theatre	Noah Thomasfor in Everybody's Talking About Jamie at the Apollo Theatre; Jason Brock in Thriller – Live at the Lyric Theatre; Jonathan Andrew Hume in Come from Away at the Phoenix Theatre
Best Female Actor in a Play	Best Female Actor in a Musical
Rakie Ayola for On Bear Ridge at the Royal Court Theatre; Ronke Adekoluejo in Three Sisters at the National Theatre; Sharon D. Clarke in Death of a Salesman at the Piccadilly Theatre	Miriam-Teak Lee in & Juliet at the Shaftesbury Theatre; Aisha Jawando in TINA - The Tina Turner Musical at the Aldwych Theatre; Maiya Quansah-Breed in Six at the Arts Theatre
Best Supporting Male Actor in a Play	Best Supporting Male Actor in a Musical
Nari Blair-Mangat in Cyrano de Bergerac at the Playhouse Theatre; Arinzé Kene in Death of a Salesman at the Young Vic; Reice Weathers in The Upstart Crow at the Gielgud Theatre	Nicholas McLean in Wicked at the Apollo Victoria Theatre; Arun Blair-Mangat in & Juliet at the Shaftesbury Theatre; Tarinn Callender in Hamilton at the Victoria Palace Theatre
Best Supporting Female Actor in a Play	Best Supporting Female Actor in a Musical
Cherrelle Skeete for The High Table at the Bush Theatre; Michele Austin in Cyrano de Bergerac at the Playhouse Theatre; Rosalind Eleazar in Uncle Vanya at the Harold Pinter Theatre	Nicole Raquel Dennis in Dear Evan Hansen at the Noël Coward Theatre; Melanie La Barrie in & Juliet at the Shaftesbury Theatre; Shanay Holmes in The Bridges of Madison County at the Menier Chocolate Factory

Creatives Awards
Best Director for a Play or Musical	Best Producer
Nadia Latif for Fairview at the Young Vic; Clint Dyer for Death of England at the National Theatre; Ola Ince for Appropriate at the Donmar Warehouse; Roy Alexander Weise for ''Master Harold''... and the boys at the; National Theatre	Adrian Grant for Thriller - Live at the Lyric Theatre; Nicole Raquel Dennis and Ryan Carter for Turn Up at Cadogan Hall; Tobi Kyeremateng for My White Best Friend (and Other Letters Left Unsaid); at the Royal Court Theatre
Best Choreographer	Best Dance Production
Kenrick 'H2O' Sandy MBE for REDD at the Barbican Theatre; Lanre Malaolu for Pass Over at the Kiln Theatre; Shelley Maxwell for ''Master Harold''... and the boys at the National Theatre	Ballet Black's Ingoma at the Barbican Theatre; Boy Blue's REDD at the Barbican Theatre; ZooNation's Some Like It Hip Hop at the Peacock Theatre
Best Dance Performance in a Dance Production	Best Use of Innovation and Technology
Kenrick 'H2O' Sandy MBE for REDD at the Barbican Theatre; Marcelino Sambé for The Cellist at the Royal Opera House	Nicole Raquel Dennis and Ryan Carter for Turn Up at Cadogan Hall

Recognition Awards
Light and Sound Recognition Award	Costume Design Recognition Award
Carmen Wright; Simeon Miller; Tony Gayle	Natalie Pryce; Jodie Simone Howe; Maybelle Laye
Book and Lyrics Recognition Award	Musical Director Recognition Award
Arinzé Kene; Roy Williams; Shirley Thompson OBE	Ian Oakley; Sean Green; Shiloh Coke
Casting Director Recognition Award	
Isabella Odoffin	

Achievement Awards
LGBTQ+ Champion Award	Disability Champion Award
Layton Williams; Arun Blair-Mangat; Rikki Beadle-Blair MBE	Rachel Nwokoro; Chris Fonseca
Best Teacher of Performing Arts as a Subject	Best Recent Graduate Award
David Blake from WAC Arts; Dollie Henry from Trinity Laban Conservatoire of Music and Dance; Kamara Gray for the Urdang Academy/Artistry Youth Dance	Tonye Scott-Obene from Italia Conti Academy of Theatre Arts; Danielle Fiamanya from Guildford School of Acting; Stacy Abalogun from the Royal Academy of Dramatic Art
Lifetime Achievement	
Shirley Thompson OBE	

== See also ==
- Laurence Olivier Awards
- WhatsOnStage Awards
- Evening Standard Theatre Awards
- Tony Awards
- Drama Desk Awards
