= USHERS: The Front of House Musical =

- Music: Yiannis Koutsakos
- Lyrics: James Oban & Yiannis Koutsakos
- Book: James Rottger
- Premiere: The Hope Theatre, London
- Productions: 2013 Hope Theatre; 2014 Charing Cross Theatre; 2015 Edinburgh Fringe Festival; 2015 Arts Theatre (London); 2024 The Other Palace (London)

USHERS: The Front of House Musical is a British musical comedy with music by Yiannis Koutsakos, lyrics by James Oban and Yiannis Koutsakos, and a book by James Rottger. The show focuses on a team of theatre front of house staff navigating career ambition, relationships, and industry politics, told with irreverent humour and catchy contemporary songs.

The musical premiered at the Hope Theatre (London) in December 2013 and transferred to the Charing Cross Theatre (London) in 2014. After a run at the Edinburgh Festival Fringe in August 2015, it moved back to London’s Arts Theatre for a limited run from September to October 2015. A 10th anniversary production followed in 2024.

== Production history ==
Originally conceived during the 2012 “Search for a Twitter Composer” competition led by West End Producer, USHERS began as a 20-minute showcase created by composer Yiannis Koutsakos and lyricist James Oban. With bookwriter James Rottger joining the team, the trio launched a Kickstarter campaign to fund a try out production and successfully raised the funds needed.

The show premiered at the Hope Theatre in Islington, London from 3 December to 31 December 2013. The fringe run received strong reviews, celebrating its cheeky and insightful take on the realities of theatre work.

Due to its success, the production transferred to the Charing Cross Theatre for a six-week run beginning in March 2014. The production was extended to run through to June 2014.

In August 2015, USHERS was presented at the Edinburgh Festival Fringe, where it was staged with a new cast and gained national exposure. This led to a West End transfer for a limited season at the Arts Theatre in London from 9 September to 18 October 2015.

To mark its tenth anniversary, USHERS returned in 2024 with a new production at The Other Palace in London, running from 10 April to 19 May. Produced by James Steel andthis version highlighted the show’s legacy as a grassroots success story. It featured a revised cast and creative team while retaining its signature satirical edge and original Director Max Reynolds.

== Musical numbers ==
Act 1

- Welcome! - Company
- Spend Per Head - Robin & the Ushers
- Leading Men - Rosie & the Boys
- Induction - The Ushers
- The Parts I Could Play - Stephen
- Dreams & Ice Creams - Lucy
- (It's Time To) Let Go - Ben
- Interval Preparations - Company

Act 2

- Welcome Back! - Company
- Half-Finished Story - Gary
- The Ballad of Robin Pockets - Robin
- Loving You Is All I Know - Gary & Ben
- The Ballad of Robin Pockets (reprise) - Robin
- Goodbye! - Company

== Cast and characters ==
Character	Hope Theatre (2013)	Charing Cross Theatre (2014)	Edinburgh Fringe (2015)	Arts Theatre (2015)	The Other Palace (2024)
Gary	Will Jennings	Daniel Buckley	Ben Fenner	Ben Fenner	Cleve September
Ben	Liam Ross-Mills	Liam Ross-Mills	Rory Maguire	Rory Maguire	Luke Bayer
Rosie	Chloe Brooks	Ceris Hines	Alexandra Parkes	Alexandra Parkes	Bethany Amber Perrins
Lucy	Abigail-Carter Simpson	Carly Thoms	Corrine Priest	Corrine Priest	Danielle Rose
Stephen	Ross McNeill	Ross McNeill	Cameron Sharp	Cameron Sharp	Christopher Foley
Robin	Ralph Bogard	Ralph Bogard	Harry Stone	Harry Stone	Daniel Page
