= Danielle Fiamanya =

Scottish actress

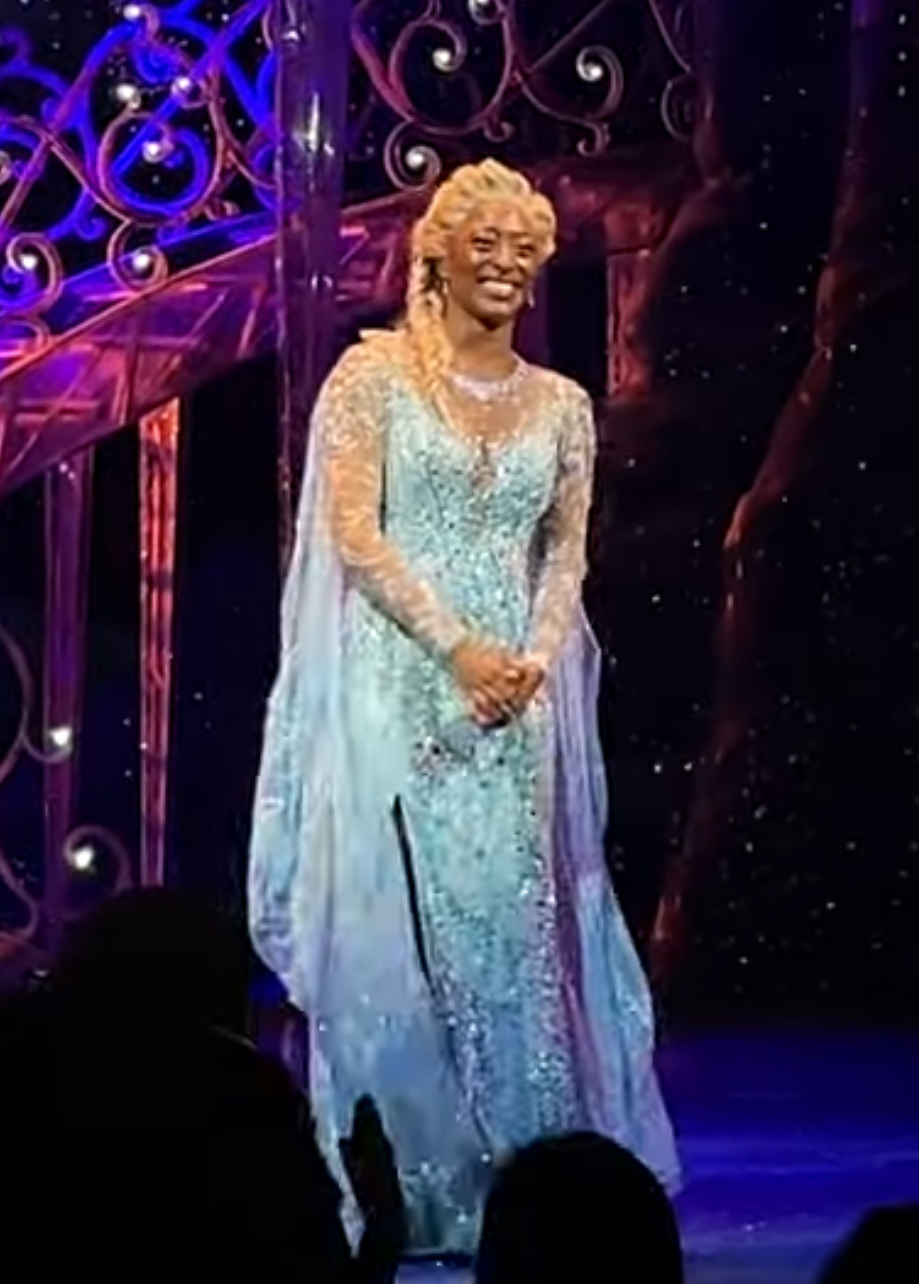
- Fiamanya performing in Frozen in 2022
- Education: Guildford School of Acting
- Years active: 2018–present

Danielle Fiamanya is a Scottish actress. She is known for her work in musical theatre, earning a Laurence Olivier Award nomination and a Stage Debut Award.

== Early life ==
Fiamanya started taking theatre lessons at Razzamataz Glasgow at age 11. She graduated from the Guildford School of Acting in 2019.

== Career ==
Upon graduating from drama school in 2019, Fiamanya was cast as Nettie in the Curve Leicester and Birmingham Hippodrome production of The Color Purple. For her performance, Fiamanya won Best Actress in a Musical at The Stage Debut Awards. Fiamanya also joined the ensemble of & Juliet, which premiered at Manchester Opera House and had a run at the Shaftesbury Theatre, marking Fiamanya's West End debut. She won the Recent Graduate Award at the 2020 Black British Theatre Awards.

From 2021 to 2022, Fiamanya was in the ensemble of Frozen at the Theatre Royal, Drury Lane and served as cover Elsa for Samantha Barks. Fiamanya originated the portrayal of Winnie Mandela in the musical Mandela at the Young Vic in December 2022. She also made her television debut and portrayed Carol Kenyon in episode of the fifth season the Netflix series The Crown.

Fiamanya featured in the 2023 London premiere of The Secret Life of Bees at the Almeida Theatre as May Boatwright. She went on the tour of Macbeth with Ralph Fiennes and Indira Varma.

In early 2025, Fiamanya appeared in the original cast of Otherland at the Almeida Theatre. With Georgina Onuorah, Fiamanya shared the role of Fiona McLaren in the musical Brigadoon at Regent's Park Open Air Theatre. Fiamanya and Onuorah were jointly nominated for the Laurence Olivier Award for Best Actress in a Musical.

== Filmography ==
| Year | Title | Role | Notes |
|---|---|---|---|
| 2022 | Halo | UNSC Nurse | 2 episodes |
| 2022 | The Crown | Carol Kenyon | |
| 2026 | Counsels | Agent Rhea Williams | |

== Stage ==
| Year | Title | Role | Notes |
|---|---|---|---|
| 2018 | Prom Queen | Carly | The Other Palace, London |
| 2019 | The Color Purple | Nettie | Curve Theatre, Leicester / Birmingham Hippodrome |
| 2019 | & Juliet | Ensemble / cover Lady Capulet | Manchester Opera House / Shaftesbury Theatre, London |
| 2020 | Hair concert | Dionne | Turbine Theatre, London |
| 2021 | Frozen | Ensemble / cover Elsa | Theatre Royal, Drury Lane |
| 2022 | Mandela | Winnie Mandela | Young Vic, London |
| 2023 | The Secret Life of Bees | May Boatwright | Almeida Theatre, London |
| 2023 | Macbeth | Second Witch | Tour |
| 2025 | Otherland | Lily | Almeida Theatre, London |
| 2025 | Brigadoon | Fiona McLaren | Regent's Park Open Air Theatre, London |

== Awards and nominations ==
| Year | Award | Category | Work | Result | Ref. |
|---|---|---|---|---|---|
| 2019 | The Stage Debut Awards | Best Actress in a Musical | The Color Purple | Won | |
| 2020 | Black British Theatre Awards | Recent Graduate | | Nominated | |
| 2026 | Laurence Olivier Awards | Best Actress in a Musical | Brigadoon | Nominated | (Note: Shared with Georgina Onuorah) |
