= Marie Curie (musical) =

2018 South Korean musical

- Music: Jongyoon Choi
- Lyrics: Seeun Choun
- Book: Seeun Choun
- Premiere: 2018: Hongik Daehangno Art Center
- Productions: 2018 Seoul; 2019 Shanghai; 2020 Seoul; 2022 Warsaw; 2023 Tokyo; 2024 London
- Awards: 2021 Korea Musical Awards

Marie Curie is a Korean musical with book and lyrics by Seeun Choun and music by Jongyoon Choi. The show tells the life story of Marie Curie from her arrival at the Sorbonne University in Paris to study, to her discovery of radium with husband Pierre and her winning the Nobel Prize.

The musical premiered in South Korea in 2018 and has since seen several performances in Asia and Europe, most recently in London's Charing Cross Theatre, UK.

== Synopsis ==
As she arrives from her native home in Poland to study at the Sorbonne University in Paris, young Marie Sklodowska is certain she can make a name for herself and change the course of science. She discovers radium, a new chemical element, with her husband Pierre Curie and she's lauded with the Nobel Prize.

But she is faced with an overwhelming moral dilemma. As Marie discovers the lifesaving potential of radium to cure cancer, factory workers handling the glowing substance are succumbing to the insidious grip of radium poisoning.

As a woman with society against her, can she wrestle with both the potential danger of her discovery - and what is she if radium's dangers overshadow its possibilities?

== Musical numbers ==
- Prologue
- A Map of Everything
- Miss Poland
- The Limit
- The Limit (reprise)
- Forty-five Months
- Radium Paradise (part one)
- Radium Paradise (part two)
- Hope You're Well
- Unpredictable, Unidentified
- The Memorial
- Marie's Plea
- No Problem
- Another Name
- The Conflict
- Line of Death
- In the Darkness
- The Conflict (reprise)
- Bolero
- You Are The Reason
- Unpredictable, Unidentified (reprise)
- Finale

== Production history ==
=== Original Korean production ===
Writer Choun See-un fell in love with musicals at a very young age and was inspired to write about Marie Curie when her daughter asked her the first name of Madame Curie, from one of her children's books. See-un had to find out, as she couldn't remember, and started reading more and more about the scientist, leading her to write a musical about her life story.

The musical received founding from the Arts Council Korea, in the attempt to promote arts and cultural activities in the country and had a try-out premiere in Seoul in 2018 at the Hongik Daehangno Art Center.

2019 the musical was part of the K-Musical Roadshow in Shangai (Shanghai Culture Plaza, hosted by Korea Arts Management Service - KAMS).

In 2020 Marie Curie received its Korean premiere in Seoul at the Chungmu Art Center. Joohyun Ok and Sophie Kim were sharing the lead role of Marie.

=== London try-outs (2022) ===
In 2022 Marie Curie was showcased in London at Gatsby's Mansion, together with two other Korean shows, as part of K-Musical Roadshow hosted by KAMS. The creative team included director Sarah Meadows, music director Emma Fraser and dramaturg Tom Ramsay.

=== European concert ===
In 2022 select songs from the musical were performed at a Gala concert in Warsaw, at the Music Garden Festival in Curie's homeland, Poland. This marked the first time that an Asian musical cast was officially invited to the festival. Lead actress Kim So-hyang (also known as Sophie Kim) performed Curie's solo song "Another Name" and Kim and actress Lee Bomsori, who played Anne, sang their duet "You're My Star."

=== Asian productions (2023-2024) ===
After a 2023 licensed production in Japan, Tokyo (Tennozu Galaxy Theater) and Osaka (Umeda Arts Theater) the show ran for several performances across South Korea, including a third run in Seoul (at the Hongik Art Center), one in Gwangju (Mar 24), one in Andong (Mar 24) and one in Gimhae (May 24).

=== London production (2024) ===
Ahead of its official opening in London, a recording of the 2020 Seoul show was screened at the Korean Cultural Centre in London in June 2024. The Seoul version of the show starred Joo-hyun Ok and So-hyang Kim as Marie Curie, and the two actresses were reunited to share insight about the show, after the screening.

An English version of the show, with new musical arrangements and titled Marie Curie a New Musical, ran in June and July 2024 at the Charing Cross Theatre. The cast starred Ailsa Davidson as Marie Curie, Chrissie Bhima as Anne Kowalska and Thomas Josling as Pierre Curie. The creative team included director Sarah Meadows, music director Emma Fraser (who returned to work on the show after the 2022 showcase) and choreographer Joanna Goodwin, with the English Book Adaptation by Tom Ramsay and Lyrics Adaptation by Emma Fraser.

== Cast and characters ==
| Character | Seoul (2020) | Seoul (2023) | London (2024) |
|---|---|---|---|
| Marie Sklodowska-Curie | Joohyun Ok and Sophie Kim | Kim So Hyun, Lee Jung Hwa and Yu Ri A | Ailsa Davidson |
| Anne Kowalska | Bomsori Lee | Kang Hye In, Hyo Eun and Choi Ji Hye | Chrissie Bhima |
| Pierre Curie | Chan Ryeol Lee | Park Young Su, Lim Byeol and Kim Zy Chul | Thomas Josling |
| Ruben DeLong | Seng Lee Yang | Kim Chan Ho, Yang Seunglee and An Jaeyoung | Richard Meek |
| Irene Curie and Louise | | Ock Gyeongmin and Min Jung Ah | Lucy Young |
| Marcin and Dr Chagall | | Song Sang Hoon and Cho Bae Geun | Dean Makowski-Clayton |
| Emilia | | | Maya Kristal Tenenbaum |
| Janka | | | Isabel Snaas |
| Lech, Dean and Hospital Director | | Lee Chan Ryeol and Shin Eun Ho | Christopher Killik |
| Pawel | | | Yujin Park |

== Awards and nominations ==
| Year | Award | Category | Nominee | Result |
|---|---|---|---|---|
| 2021 | Korea Musical Awards | Grand Prize | Marie Curie | Won |
| 2021 | Korea Musical Awards | Best Director | Kim Tae-hyung | Won |
| 2021 | Korea Musical Awards | Best Screenplay | Cheon Se-eun | Won |
| 2021 | Korea Musical Awards | Best Music - Composition | Choi Jong-yoon | Won |
| 2021 | Korea Musical Awards | Best Producer | Kang Byung Won | Won |
