= Femuline =

Studio album by Todrick Hall
- Released: June 8, 2021
- Genre: Dance-pop; pop rap
- Length: 43:57
- Label: FrtyFve
- Producer: Jeeve; WiiDope

Todrick Hall chronology
Haus Party, Pt. 3 (2021)	Femuline (2021)	Femuline Gaymeova (2022)

Singles from Femuline
- 1. "Boys in the Ocean" Released: June 4, 2021; 2. "Rainin' Fellas" Released: June 8, 2021

Femuline is the fourth studio album by American recording artist Todrick Hall, released on June 8, 2021. The album is inspired by gay pride and its title refers to Hall embracing both his feminine and masculine sides. It features appearances from Chaka Khan, Brandy, Tyra Banks, Ts Madison, and Nicole Scherzinger. An extended version called Femuline Reloaded was released on November 17, 2021. It includes all songs from Femuline as well three new songs and three remixes of songs previously released.

== Track listing ==
All tracks are written by Todrick Hall. All songs produced by Todrick Hall, Jeeve and WiiDope.

Femuline track listing
No.	Title	Length
1.	"Foreplay"	0:33
2.	"Berserk"	3:17
3.	"Fabulosity" (featuring Chaka Khan)	3:16
4.	"Queen"	4:04
5.	"Both"	3:14
6.	"Click Clack" (featuring Brandy)	3:09
7.	"Fashón" (featuring Tyra Banks)	3:22
8.	"Dick This Big" (featuring Ts Madison)	2:18
9.	"Rainin' Fellas"	3:18
10.	"Boys in the Ocean"	3:15
11.	"Show Off" (featuring Nicole Scherzinger)	3:40
12.	"GG"	3:12
13.	"Parade"	3:08
14.	"Rainbow Reign"	4:06
Total length:		43:57

Femuline Reloaded track listing
No.	Title	Length
15.	"Pumps to the Party"	3:02
16.	"Wind it Up"	2:56
17.	"Vogue Zone"	2:20
18.	"Boys In The Ocean - Remix" (featuring Cazwell)	3:55
19.	"Rainin' Fellas - Remix" (featuring DJ Danny Morris)	5:48
20.	"Queen - Remix" (featuring DJ Danny Morris)	4:38

Notes

- All song titles stylized in all caps except Boys in the Ocean.
