= Straight Outta Oz =

Studio album by Todrick Hall
- Released: 23 June 2016
- Recorded: 2014–2016
- Length: 48:32
- Label: Self-Released

Todrick Hall chronology
MTV's Todrick: The Music, Vol. 1 (2015)	Straight Outta Oz (2016)	Forbidden (2018)

Singles from Straight Outta Oz
- 1. "Low" Released: March 22, 2017

Straight Outta Oz is the second solo studio album and original musical, written and produced by American singer-songwriter and YouTube celebrity Todrick Hall with music produced by Jeeve Ducornet and wiidope, released on 23 June 2016. Featured artists include Nicole Scherzinger, Jordin Sparks, Perez Hilton, Joseph Gordon-Levitt, Amber Riley, Raven-Symoné and Tamar Braxton. It is based on the Wizard of Oz whilst being a semi-autobiographical account of his rise to fame in Los Angeles (Oz).

== Music videos ==
The trailer for the album was first released on May 13, 2016. Todrick has released the musical in the form of an hour long piece (as well as each song separately) on his YouTube channel. On April 27, 2017, the song "Defying Gravity" was released as a music video and digital download. The song does not appear on either the standard or deluxe versions of the album but does appear in the tour.

== Track listing ==
All tracks are written by Todrick Hall, except where noted.

No.	Title	Length
1.	"No Place Like Home"	3:11
2.	"Proud"	2:37
3.	"Over the Rainbow"	3:50
4.	"Color" (featuring Jay Armstrong Johnson)	2:44
5.	"Little People"	2:45
6.	"Expensive"	3:00
7.	"Dumb"	2:55
8.	"If I Had a Heart"	2:51
9.	"Lyin' to Myself"	3:28
10.	"Lions and Tigers and Bears" (featuring Amber Riley)	2:37
11.	"Papi" (featuring Nicole Scherzinger)	3:47
12.	"Green" (featuring Perez Hilton)	3:00
13.	"See Your Face" (featuring Amber Riley)	2:11
14.	"Wrong Bitch" (featuring Bob the Drag Queen)	2:38
15.	"Water Guns" (featuring Jordin Sparks)	3:24
16.	"Home"	3:34

== Deluxe Edition ==
On March 21, 2017, Hall released a deluxe version of the visual album on YouTube as well as iTunes, featuring 4 songs from the Straight Outta Oz Tour that were not present on the album, as well as re-recorded versions of other songs. This album also included the song "Blah Blah Blah" present in the original version of the video, but not on the original album. It also includes a remix of Todrick's previous 2015 single "Low" with new vocals from RuPaul.

All tracks are written by Todrick Hall, except where noted.

No.	Title	Length
1.	"No Place Like Home"	3:11
2.	"Proud"	2:37
3.	"Over the Rainbow"	3:50
4.	"Black & White" (featuring Kirstin Maldonado, Scott Hoying, and Mitch Grassi)	4:14
5.	"Color" (featuring Jay Armstrong Johnson)	2:44
6.	"Little People"	2:45
7.	"Expensive"	3:00
8.	"Whoop Dat Ass" (writer: Tracie Thoms)	2:03
9.	"Flying Monkey Lament 1" (writer: Raven-Symoné)	1:01
10.	"Dumb"	2:55
11.	"If I Had a Heart"	2:51
12.	"Lyin' to Myself"	3:28
13.	"Lions and Tigers and Bears" (writer: Tamar Braxton)	2:37
14.	"Papi" (featuring Nicole Scherzinger)	3:47
15.	"Green" (featuring Perez Hilton)	3:00
16.	"Flying Monkey Lament 2" (writer: Shoshana Bean)	1:20
17.	"See Your Face" (writer: Amber Riley)	2:11
18.	"Wrong Bitch" (Deluxe Edition Extended Version featuring Bob The Drag Queen)	3:36
19.	"Water Guns" (featuring Jordin Sparks)	3:24
20.	"Blah Blah Blah" (featuring Joseph Gordon-Levitt)	1:53
21.	"Home"	3:34
22.	"Low" (Deluxe Edition Remixed Version featuring RuPaul)	3:21

== Behind the Curtain ==
Behind the Curtain, a documentary film about the making of Straight Outta Oz, was released in select theaters on December 6 and 13, 2017. It was released for digital download and on Netflix on December 12. A trailer for it was played prior to the opening of Hall's concerts in 2017.

== Tour ==
To promote the album, Hall launched the Straight Outta Oz Tour for summer 2016. Originally a 30-date tour taking place in North America, starting in Vancouver, Canada, on July 7, 2016. On February 18, 2017, additional dates in the United States, Australia, and Europe were announced; the tour would officially conclude in Melbourne, Australia, on June 5, 2017.

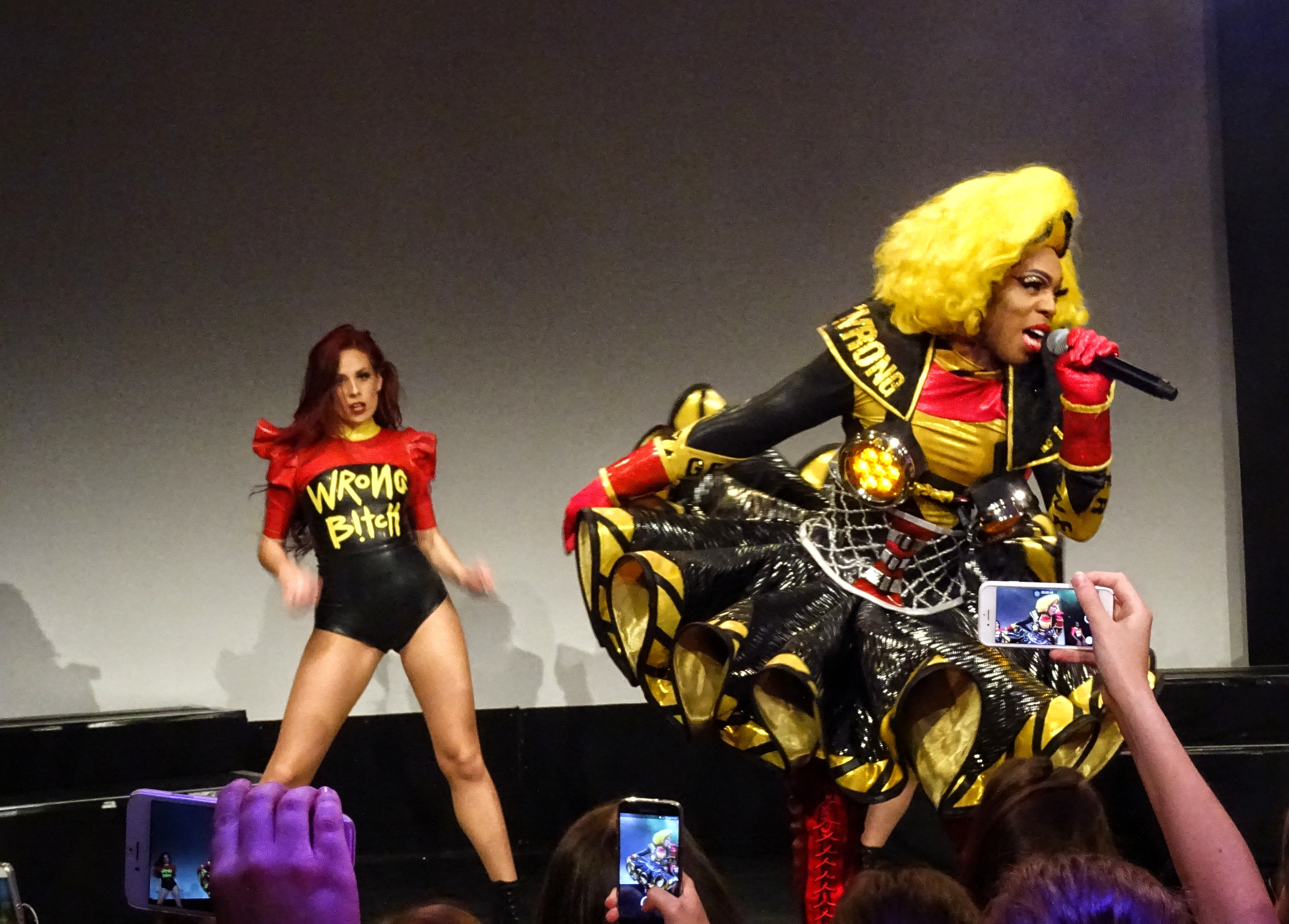
Todrick Hall performing "Wrong Bitch" on his "Straight Outta Oz" Tour.

=== Set list ===
The following set list is obtained from the July 13, 2016, show in Beverly Hills, California. It is not intended to represent all dates throughout the tour.

1. "Dance Rehearsal" (Introduction) (contains elements of "Cheap Trills", "Swalla", "Side to Side", "Shape of You", and "Sorry.")
2. "No Place Like Home"
3. "Meet the Divas" (Interlude)
4. "Black and White"
5. "His Eye Is on the Sparrow" (Interlude)
6. "Proud"
7. "Over the Rainbow"
8. "Color"
9. "Round and Round" / "Verified"
10. "Little People"
11. "Expensive"
12. "Monkey Airlines" (Interlude)
13. "Whoop That Ass"
14. "Dumb"
15. "If I Had a Heart"
16. "Lyin' to Myself"
17. "Lions and Tigers and Bears" (Interlude)
18. "Papi"
19. "Green"
20. "What Do Ya Say?"
21. "Flying Monkey" (Interlude)
22. "See Your Face"
23. "Low"
24. "Wrong Bitch"
25. "Defying Gravity" (Interlude)
26. "Water Guns"
27. "Blah Blah Blah"
28. "Home"
29. "Splits on Trees" / "Twerkin' in the Rain" / "Weave Girls"
30. "4 Beyoncé" (Note: A megamix consisting of all the singer's songs from Beyoncé's first five studio albums.)

Encore

31. "Haterz"

Notes

- For 2017 shows, "90's Disney", a megamix consisting of several Disney songs from the 1990s, was added to the set list.

=== Tour dates ===
Date	City	Country	Venue
North America
July 7, 2016	Vancouver	Canada	Vogue Theatre
July 8, 2016	Tacoma	United States	Pantages Theater
July 9, 2016	Portland	United States	Aladdin Theater
July 12, 2016	Sacramento	United States	Crest Theatre
July 13, 2016	San Jose	United States	California Theatre
July 14, 2016	Fresno	United States	Tower Theatre for the Performing Arts
July 15, 2016	Anaheim	United States	City National Grove of Anaheim
July 16, 2016	San Diego	United States	Balboa Theatre
July 17, 2016	Phoenix	United States	Comerica Theatre
July 19, 2016	San Antonio	United States	H-E-B Performance Hall
July 20, 2016	Houston	United States	The Ballroom at Warehouse Live
July 21, 2016	Grand Prairie	United States	Verizon Theatre at Grand Prairie
July 22, 2016	Austin	United States	Bass Performance Hall
July 23, 2016	New Orleans	United States	House of Blues
July 25, 2016	Clearwater	United States	Capitol Theatre
July 26, 2016	Jacksonville	United States	Florida Theatre
July 27, 2016	Fort Lauderdale	United States	Amaturo Theater
July 28, 2016	Orlando	United States	Beacham Theater
July 29, 2016	Atlanta	United States	Center Stage Theater
July 30, 2016	Raleigh	United States	Meymandi Concert Hall
July 31, 2016	Baltimore	United States	Baltimore Soundstage
August 1, 2016	Washington	United States	Howard Theatre
August 3, 2016	Boston	United States	Wilbur Theatre
August 4, 2016	New York City	United States	Highline Ballroom
August 5, 2016	New York City	United States	Gramercy Theatre
August 6, 2016	Toronto	Canada	Queen Elizabeth Theatre
August 7, 2016	Chicago	United States	Thalia Hall
August 9, 2016	Milwaukee	United States	Turner Hall
August 10, 2016	Royal Oak	United States	Royal Oak Music Theatre
August 11, 2016	Columbus	United States	Lincoln Theatre
August 12, 2016	Glenside	United States	Keswick Theatre
March 30, 2017	New York City	United States	PlayStation Theater
April 3, 2017	Chicago	United States	Portage Theater
April 4, 2017	Minneapolis	United States	The Pourhouse
April 6, 2017	Denver	United States	Paramount Theatre
April 7, 2017	Wichita	United States	Orpheum Theatre
April 8, 2017	Overland Park	United States	Yardley Hall Carlsen Center
April 9, 2017	St. Louis	United States	The Sheldon Concert Hall
April 10, 2017	Louisville	United States	Mercury Ballroom
April 11, 2017	West Lafayette	United States	Loeb Playhouse
April 14, 2017	Munhall	United States	Carnegie of Homestead Music Hall
April 17, 2017	Philadelphia	United States	The Fillmore Philadelphia
April 18, 2017	Washington, D.C.	United States	Howard Theatre
April 19, 2017	Washington, D.C.	United States	Howard Theatre
April 20, 2017	Raleigh	United States	A.J. Fletcher Opera Theater
April 21, 2017	Orange Park	United States	Thrasher-Horne Center For The Arts
April 22, 2017	Fort Lauderdale	United States	Parker Playhouse
April 23, 2017	Atlanta	United States	Atlanta Symphony Hall
April 25, 2017	Nashville	United States	Marathon Music Works
April 26, 2017	Memphis	United States	Halloran Centre for Performing Arts
April 27, 2017	Birmingham	United States	Carver Theatre
April 28, 2017	Oklahoma City	United States	Civic Center Music Hall
April 29, 2017	Houston	United States	Revention Music Center
April 30, 2017	Dallas	United States	The Bomb Factory
May 1, 2017	Albuquerque	United States	National Hispanic Cultural Center
May 3, 2017	Mesa	United States	Mesa Arts Center
May 4, 2017	Tucson	United States	Rialto Theatre
May 5, 2017	Riverside	United States	Fox Performing Arts Center
May 6, 2017	Las Vegas	United States	Rocks Lounge
May 9, 2017	Berkeley	United States	The UC Theatre
May 10, 2017	Grants Pass	United States	Rogue Theatre
May 11, 2017	Portland	United States	Aladdin Theater
May 12, 2017	Seattle	United States	The Moore Theatre
May 13, 2017	Bend	United States	Tower Theatre
May 14, 2017	Boise	United States	The Egyptian Theatre
May 16, 2017	Santa Cruz	United States	The Rio Theatre
May 20, 2017	Beverly Hills	United States	Saban Theatre
Europe
May 22, 2017	London	England	O2 Shepherds Bush Empire
May 23, 2017	Milan	Italy	Teatro della Luna
May 24, 2017	Zurich	Switzerland	Plaza
May 26, 2017	Cologne	Germany	Gloria Theater
May 29, 2017	Amsterdam	Netherlands	Theater De Meervaart
Oceania
June 1, 2017	Perth	Australia	Astro Theatre
June 4, 2017	Sydney	Australia	Enmore Theatre
June 5, 2017	Melbourne	Australia	Athenaeum Theatre
