= Charing Cross Theatre =

Theatre in London, England

The Charing Cross Theatre
- Interactive map of The Charing Cross Theatre
- Former names: New Players Theatre
- Address: The Arches, Villiers Street; Westminster, London; UK
- Coordinates: 51.508099°N 0.124134°W
- Owner: Steven M. Levy & Sean Sweeney
- Capacity: 265
- Type: Off-West End theatre
- Current use: Theatre

Construction
- Opened: 1936

Website
- www.charingcrosstheatre.co.uk

The Charing Cross Theatre is an Off-West End theatre under The Arches off Villiers Street below Charing Cross station. Founded in 1936, the venue occupied several premises in the West End of London before locating to its present site. The current site, from 1946 to 2002, presented Victorian-style music hall under the name Players' Theatre. It was refurbished in 2005 and reopened under new management in 2006 as The New Players Theatre, before being taken under new management by Broadway producer Steven M. Levy and Sean Sweeney in 2011, when the theatre changed its name to the Charing Cross Theatre, with the Players Bar & Kitchen.

It is one of the smallest West End Theatres, rebuilt to meet the demands of national and international producers wanting a theatre which offers a degree of intimacy and is the equivalent in size of an off-Broadway space.

With the appointment of Thom Southerland as artistic director in 2016, Charing Cross Theatre announced it was turning into a producing house launching with a number of major musicals.

== Productions ==
=== Recent ===
- Marie Curie a New Musical - 1 June 2024 - 28 July 2024
- Bronco Billy the Musical - 24 January 2024 - 4 April 2024
- Rebecca – 4 September 2023 - 18 November 2023
- Allegiance – 7 January 2023 - 8 April 2023
- From Here To Eternity – 29 October 2022 – 17 December 2022
- Zorro: The Musical – 2 April 2022 – 28 May 2022
- Divine/Simply Divine – UK professional premiere, October 2019
- Amour – UK professional premiere, May - June 2019
- Violet – UK professional premiere, January - April 2019
- The Woman In White – 1st London revival, November 2017 - February 2018
- The Knowledge – 4–11 September 2017
- Death Takes a Holiday – 3 December 2016 – 21 January 2017
- Ragtime – 8 October – 10 December 2016
- Titanic – 28 May – 6 August 2016 (Return of Southwark Playhouse production)
- Piaf Play – Dec 2015 - Jan 2016
- Dusty – 2015
- Truth, Lies Diana – 2014
- Grim – August 2014
- Ushers: The Front of House Musical – March to June 2014
- Finian's Rainbow – April to May 2014
- Lost Boy (play) Phil Willmott
- A Christmas Carol
- Wag The Musical
- Dear World
- Naked Boys Singing
- La bohème
- Keeler
