= Forbidden (Todrick Hall album) =

Studio album by Todrick Hall
- Released: March 28, 2018
- Recorded: 2017–2018
- Genres: Pop; hip hop soul; R&B; electropop
- Length: 84:00
- Label: Self-released

Todrick Hall chronology
Straight Outta Oz (2016)	Forbidden (2018)	Haus Party, Pt. 1 (2019)

Singles from Forbidden
- 1. "Ordinary Day" Released: March 14, 2018; 2. "Dem Beats" Released: March 22, 2018

Forbidden is the third solo album by American singer-songwriter and YouTube celebrity Todrick Hall with music produced by Jeeve Ducornet and wiidope, released on March 28, 2018.

== Composition ==
Featured artists include Jade Novah, RuPaul, Brandy, Cynthia Erivo, Keala Settle, Tamar Braxton, Jenifer Lewis, Tiffany Haddish, Sheryl Lee Ralph, Bob the Drag Queen, Shangela, Tre Melvin, Kway, Nick Rashad Burroughs, Scotch Ellis Loring, Doug Spearman, and Cristian Anthony Fagins.

It is a concept album and visual album that talks about a distant future in which black LGBT people rule the fictitious North-American city of Nacirema Falls, in the fictitious country Nacirema, promoting white racism and "straightphobia" as a critique to nowadays prejudice against the black and LGBT communities.

== Music videos ==
Hall has released the musical in the form of an hour-and-a-half-long piece (as well as each song separately) on his YouTube channel. "2003" is the only song that is not included in the full video, however a bonus music video was released.

== Promotion ==
On March 14, 2018, the music video for "Ordinary Day" was released on Todrick's YouTube channel as the first single from the album. The second single, "Dem Beats" was released on March 22 along with the pre-order for the album. Following the release of the album, every song was released as an individual video. In addition, Todrick has released 6 episodes of a behind the scenes series called "Making Forbidden: Todrick Hall", as well as instrumentals of "Type", "Play", "Forbidden", "Wanted", "Thug", "Forever", "Doll Hairs", "Boys Wear Pink", and "All American." Hall promoted the musical with a worldwide tour, titled Todrick Hall American: The Forbidden World Tour.

== Track listing ==
All tracks are written by Todrick Hall.

CD 1
No.	Title	Length
1.	"Trust No Bitch"	1:25
2.	"Wanted"	3:38
3.	"Changed My Mind"	2:47
4.	"Lullaby" (vocals by Brandy)	4:23
5.	"National Anthem" (vocals by Tamar Braxton)	1:04
6.	"All American"	3:30
7.	"What's Going On"	1:20
8.	"Ka-Ching"	2:59
9.	"Ordinary Day" (vocals by Nick Rashad Burroughs)	2:06
10.	"Shine" (vocals by Teresa Stanley)	1:10
11.	"Nobody" (duet by Jade Novah and Cynthia Erivo)	3:54
12.	"Silver Spoon" (vocals by Carlie Craig)	1:05
13.	"Type"	3:22
14.	"T.H.U.G. (Trade)"	3:02
15.	"B"	1:58

CD 2
No.	Title	Length
1.	"Dem Beats" (featuring RuPaul)	3:38
2.	"Break My Heart"	1:13
3.	"Eleven" (featuring Jade Novah)	2:50
4.	"Play" (featuring Jade Novah)	3:43
5.	"Ring-a-Ling"	0:53
6.	"Doll Hairs" (featuring Shangela)	4:18
7.	"2003"	3:23
8.	"Animals" (vocals by Matt Bloyd)	2:23
9.	"Forever"	3:17
10.	"Forbidden" (featuring Jade Novah and Keala Settle)	4:50
11.	"Painting in the Rain"	4:29
12.	"Heaven"	4:07
13.	"Pettiness"	0:48
14.	"Apple Pie"	3:13
15.	"Boys Wear Pink" (End Credits)	3:25

Track listing adapted from AllMusic and the iTunes Store.

== Charts ==
Chart (2018)	Peak position
US Heatseekers Albums (Billboard)	2
US Independent Albums (Billboard)	10
