= Todrick =

- Genre: Reality television
- Starring: Todrick Hall
- Country of origin: United States
- Original language: English
- No. of seasons: 1
- No. of episodes: 8

Production
- Executive producers: Scooter Braun; Lois Curren; Brian Graden; Todrick Hall; Gaurav Misra; Danny Rose; Danny Salles
- Production company: Brian Graden Media

Original release
- Network: MTV
- Release: August 31 – October 19, 2015

Todrick is an American reality television series featuring Todrick Hall. The show aired on MTV for eight episodes from August 31 to October 19, 2015.

== Cast ==
- Todrick Hall
- Chester Lockhart
- Nicole "LipstickNick" Faulkner
- Kaley Hatfield
- Vonzell Solomon
- Carlie Craig
- Jenni Thomasson
- Shawn Adeli
- ThurZday

=== Guests ===
- Madison Beer
- Dexter
- GloZell
- Joseph Gordon Levitt
- Shanna Malcolm
- Jenna Marbles
- Aubrey O'Day
- Jillian Rose Reed
- Kelly Rowland

== Episodes ==
No.	Title	Original release date	U.S. viewers (millions)
1	"Who Let the Freaks Out"	August 31, 2015	0.50
2	"Texas"	September 7, 2015	N/A
3	"Epic Love"	September 14, 2015	N/A
4	"Wind It Up"	September 21, 2015	0.16
5	"Titaniqua"	September 28, 2015	0.18
6	"You Unfollowed Me"	October 5, 2015	0.15
7	"Dem Cakes"	October 12, 2015	0.19
8	"Peter Perry"	October 19, 2015	0.17

== Soundtrack ==
MTV's Todrick: The Music, Vol. 1

Soundtrack album by Todrick Hall
- Released: October 13, 2015
- Label: Self-released

Todrick Hall chronology
Pop Star High (2014)	MTV's Todrick: The Music, Vol. 1 (2015)	Straight Outta Oz (2016)

On October 13, 2015 a soundtrack featuring all the original songs from the show alongside commentary tracks was released to digital retailers.

No.	Title	Length
1.	"Who Let the Freaks Out"	2:58
2.	"Who Let the Freaks Out (Commentary)"	0:35
3.	"Haterz"	4:17
4.	"Haterz (Commentary"	2:02
5.	"Epic Love"	3:38
6.	"Epic Love (Commentary)"	1:29
7.	"Wind It Up" (featuring Vonzell Solomon)	3:49
8.	"Wind It Up (Commentary)"	0:46
9.	"You Unfollowed Me" (featuring Joseph Gordon Levitt)	3:28
10.	"You Unfollowed Me (Commentary)"	2:05
11.	"Dem Cakes Tho"	2:47
12.	"Dem Cakes Tho (Commentary)"	1:38
