= I Like Boys =

Single by Todrick Hall

from the EP Haus Party, Pt. 1
- Released: June 28, 2019
- Genre: Pop
- Length: 3:35
- Label: Self-released
- Songwriter(s): Carl Seanté McGrier; Kofi Owusu-Ofori; Jean-Yves Ducornet; Todrick Hall
- Producer(s): wiidope Jeeves; Todrick Hall

Todrick Hall singles chronology
"Glitter" (2019)	"I Like Boys" (2019)

"I Like Boys" is a song by American singer Todrick Hall; he co-produced and co-wrote the song with Jean Yves Ducornet. Hall released the song during Pride 2019. It is the second music video for his EP, Haus Party, Pt. 1. The video opens with Hall coming out to his mother played by Luenell. The video shifts to a desert with Hall surrounded by male dancers and a camel. The song celebrates Hall's sexuality, featuring color, cultural references, and male nudity. Hall describes "I Like Boys" as a "campy version of kids coming out of the closet"

== Charts ==
Chart (2019)	Peak position
US Hot Dance/Electronic Songs (Billboard)	40
