= International Youth Arts Festival =

UK arts festival

- Genre: Festival
- Dates: July (exact dates vary each year)
- Location: Kingston upon Thames
- Country: England
- Founded: 2009
- Website: www.iyafestival.org.uk

International Youth Arts Festival (IYAF) is an annual youth arts festival held in the Royal Borough of Kingston upon Thames every July. The festival was founded in 2009 by Robin Hutchinson MBE and more than 25,000 young people have delivered the festival as participants and volunteers since its inception.

IYAF is an open-access performing arts festival and the festival programme includes a range of art forms including theatre, dance, music, comedy, visual arts and children's shows.

International Youth Arts Festival 2018 will take place from 6–15 July 2018.

== Open access ==
International Youth Arts Festival is an open-access mixed arts festival: it does not book performers and anyone may participate, with any type of performance. The official programme categorises shows into sections for theatre, comedy, children and family shows, music and circus.

== Venues ==
Since the first International Youth Arts Festival, venues across the Royal Borough of Kingston upon Thames have been supporting artists by transforming their venues into performance spaces. The festival includes over 200 events staged in venues including Rose Theatre, Arthur Cotterell Theatre, Kingston Library, Fairfield Recreation Ground, Eagle Brewery Wharf and The Library club.

== People ==
=== Artistic Directors ===
2016 - Andy Currums

2015 - Trevor Blackman

2009 - 2014 Aniela Zaba

=== Patrons ===
Festival patrons include Angellica Bell, Michael Underwood, Tom Holland, Tom Chambers, Chike Okonowo, Sheridan Smith and Matt Lucas.

=== Chairman and founding trustee ===
Robin Hutchinson MBE
