= Haus Party, Pt. 2 =

EP by Todrick Hall
- Released: September 19, 2019
- Length: 34:20
- Label: Self-released
- Producer: Jeeve; Todrick Hall; Wiidope

Todrick Hall chronology
Haus Party, Pt. 1 (2019)	Haus Party, Pt. 2 (2019)	Quarantine Queen (2020)

Singles from Haus Party, Pt. 1
- 1. "Nails, Hair, Hips, Heels (Remix)" Released: August 19, 2019; 2. "Wig" Released: September 20, 2019; 3. "Fag" Released: September 25, 2019; 4. "Dripeesha" Released: October 9, 2019; 5. "Y.A.S" Released: October 19, 2020

Haus Party, Pt. 2 is the third extended play by American singer-songwriter, actor, and YouTube personality Todrick Hall. It is the second of the Haus Party trilogy. While it was originally announced to be released in July 2019, the release was delayed to September 19, 2019. The EP features six new songs, as well as three remixes.

== Promotion ==
On August 19, 2019, an official remix "Nails, Hair, Hips, Heels" featuring American singer Ciara was released on August 19, 2019. Following the EP's release, music videos were released for "Wig", "Fag", and "Dripeesha" on September 20, September 25, and October 9, 2019, respectively. "Wig" entered the US Dance/Electronic Songs chart at number 49. To promote the EPs, Hall embarked on the Haus Party Tour in October and November 2019.

== Track listing ==
Credits taken from Tidal.

All songs written by Carl Seanté McGrier, Jean Yves "Jeeves" Ducornet, Kofi Owusu-Ofori, and Todrick Dramaul Hall and produced by Jeeve, Todrick Hall, and Wiidope.

No.	Title	Length
1.	"Cake Pop"	2:32
2.	"Two"	3:37
3.	"Fag"	2:38
4.	"Y.A.S."	3:13
5.	"Dripeesha" (featuring Tiffany Haddish)	3:07
6.	"Wig"	3:40
7.	"Nails, Hair, Hips, Heels" (Remix) (featuring Ciara)	3:58
8.	"Wig" (Sagi Kariv Remix)	6:13
9.	"Nails, Hair, Hips, Heels" (Sagi Kariv Remix)	5:22
Total length:		34:20

== Charts ==
Chart (2019)	Peak position
US Digital Albums (Billboard)	25
US Heatseekers Albums (Billboard)	6
US Independent Albums (Billboard)	21
US R&B/Hip-Hop Album Sales (Billboard)	16
US Top Album Sales (Billboard)	81
