= Midnight (musical) =

2026 musical by Todrick Hall

Midnight – An Original Musical
- Music: Todrick Hall
- Lyrics: Todrick Hall
- Book: Todrick Hall
- Premiere: October 15, 2026: Daryl Roth Theatre, New York
- Productions: 2026 Off-Broadway

Midnight is a Sung-through musical, with a book, music and lyrics by Todrick Hall. It premiered Off-Broadway in September 2026, at the Daryl Roth Theatre.

== Synopsis ==
=== Act 1 ===
In the South, shortly before the American Civil War, Rail, an enslaved young Black man, is born at midnight when his enslaved father is killed by his white owner. Rail's lover is the bubbly Lily Rose, a young Black woman ("Pretty Eyes"). Rail's owner, the young plantation heiress Scarlet, falls in love with Richard, a wealthy neighbor, at a ball that she and her family organize ("Impressed"). Richard chooses Rail to work alongside him and a group of Black and white workers on his future house ("More Than a House"), and the two men begin to bond. Richard's threatening brother Harry dislikes Rail. Richard teaches Rail how to read. Their friendship grows into mutual respect and later into a secret romantic love that is forbidden and dangerous in the old South ("I Love You"). Lily Rose becomes pregnant with Rail's child. Rail is brutally attacked by slave catchers who find him while he is sneaking out to meet Richard. Rail wishes that white people could experience slavery.

=== Act 2 ===
Conditions are magically reversed for one day, with blacks now the plantation owners, while the whites are enslaved. The blacks struggle with the urge to obtain revenge, and the whites experience poor treatment. Rail is expected under the new rules of society to whip Richard, but he loves him and works to delay the punishment until the one day period ends; he fails and whips Richard. At midnight, everyone is restored to their original roles. Rail and Richard part, hoping that their ordeal will have encouraged better treatment for the oppressed in future generations.

== Production history ==
=== Development workshops (2025–2026) ===
The show had two closed-door performances in New York City and London, before running for a paying audience as a fully staged workshop at Sadler's Wells East Theatre in London from November 11 to 15, 2025. A second fully staged and updated workshop session ran at the Sadler's Wells East from February 20 until March 8, 2026. Performers repeating their roles from the first London workshop included Rachel Tucker as Charlotte, Jeremy Beloate as Richard and Ayana George as Ethel. The score blends gospel, blues and pop with nods to classic musicals.

=== Off-Broadway (2026) ===
Midnight began previews off-Broadway on September 25, 2026, at the Daryl Roth Theatre and opened on October 15. It is set to run through January 3, 2027. The cast includes Hall as Rail (who also directs and choreographs), with Jeremy Beloate as Richard, Ayana George as Ethel and Charlotte Odusanya as Lily Rose. Kyle Turner of New York Theatre Guide praised the lyrics, music, choreography and performances and found the show entertaining but thought the "glossy" music and serious story created a "dissonant" tone. Helen Shaw, in The New York Times, called it beautifully sung but "overstuffed", praising the music but finding the action of the story "underwritten". Dan Rubins of Slant Magazine found it exhilarating and thought-provoking but "overabundant", concluding that it "sounds, looks, and innovates like the best new musical of the year. Instead of smoothing over its difficulties, Hall should go further, exposing the rough edges."

== Musical numbers ==
Act I

- "Prologue" – Company
- "Midnight" – Ethel, Squeak, Horace, Ensemble
- "Us" – Rail, Ethel, Squeak, Horace, Happy, Ensemble
- "Pretty Eyes" – Lily, Happy, Rail, Ensemble
- "Impressed" – Scarlet, Violet, Charlotte
- "The Dancing One" – Ethel, Rail
- "Dear Mama" – Rail, Ensemble
- "Two Brothers" – Richard, Harry, Ensemble
- "White People" – Rail, Ethel, Squeak, Horace, Happy, Ensemble
- "Uh-Oh" – Harry, Rail, Richard, Charlotte, Slyvester Ensemble
- "Ready or Not" – Richard
- "More Than a House" – Company
- "Forever" – Company
- "I Love You" – Rail, Richard
- "Nothing Like This" – Rail, Richard
- "Surprise" – Rail, Richard
- "Letters" Rail, Richard
- "Pretty Eyes" (reprise) – Lily
- "Twelve" (Act 1 Finale) – Company

Act II

- "Oom Doom Dadda" – Company
- "Black Excellence" – Ensemble
- "Impressed" (reprise) – Scarlet, Violet, Charlotte
- "Great Adventure" –
- "Midnightmares" –
- "Lily's Lullaby" – Lily
- "A Rose" – Lily, Ensemble
- "Home" –
- "One Last Letter" –
- "Night on Fire" –
- "A Sin" –
- "Are You a Bride?" –
- "Nightfall" –
- "Eleven O'Clock" –
- "Time" –
- "After Midnight" –

== Cast and characters ==
Character	Off-Broadway
Character	2026
Rail	Todrick Hall
Richard	Jeremy Beloate
Lily Rose	Charlotte Odusanya
Scarlet	Kennedy Caughell
Charlotte	Autumn Hurlbert
Ethel	Ayana George
Violet	Bella Coppola
Happy	Kolbi Jordan
Harry	Jimmy Brewer
Squeak	Sidney DuPont
Horace	Dwayne Clark
Sylvester	Ciaran McCarthy
