= Haus Party, Pt. 1 =

EP by Todrick Hall
- Released: May 23, 2019
- Genre: House; dance-pop; pop rap
- Length: 24:26
- Label: Self-released
- Producer: Jean Yves Ducornet; Todrick Hall; Kofi Owusu-Ofori; Carl Seante

Todrick Hall chronology
Forbidden (2018)	Haus Party, Pt. 1 (2019)	Haus Party, Pt. 2 (2019)

Singles from Haus Party, Pt. 1
- 1. "Glitter" Released: May 16, 2019; 2. "Nails, Hair, Hips, Heels" Released: May 23, 2019; 3. "I Like Boys" Released: June 28, 2019

Haus Party, Pt. 1 is the second extended play by American singer-songwriter and YouTube personality Todrick Hall. It is the first in a planned trilogy of Haus Party EPs to be released throughout 2019. While it was originally announced that Part Two would be released in July followed by Part Three in September, the release of Part Two was delayed to September, while Part Three was delayed multiple times, eventually releasing in February 2021.

== Background ==
As opposed to all his previous works since 2014's Pop Star High, Haus Party Pt. 1 is not tied to any particular narrative or concept. In reference to this, Hall said "I’m such a musical theater kid -- I think that's my safe haven -- and I feel really confident and comfortable kind of hiding behind costumes or storylines. I decided that this year I really wanted to put out music for the first time that was not directed towards any story or narrative, but just have songs that existed on their own."

He says that the album is dedicated to LGBT culture, especially drag queens and pride. The name "Haus Party" comes from the houses of the gay ball culture.

== Promotion ==
Haus Party, Pt. 1 was available for pre-order along with the first single "Glitter" on May 16, 2019. "Glitter" was previously released on Hall's YouTube channel as a music video sponsored by Google on November 27, 2018.

A music video for "Nails, Hair, Hips, Heels" was released on May 23, 2019. An official remix featuring American singer Ciara was released as a single and included on the follow-up EP Haus Party, Pt. 2. A music video for "I Like Boys" was released on June 28, 2019.

To promote the EPs, Hall embarked on the Haus Party Tour in October and November 2019.

== Track listing ==
All songs written and produced by Todrick Hall, Carl Seanté, Kofi Owusu-Ofori and Jean Yves Ducornet.

No.	Title	Length
1.	"Attention"	2:56
2.	"I Like Boys"	2:55
3.	"Glitter"	4:06
4.	"Chapstick" (featuring Trixie Mattel)	2:37
5.	"Amen"	3:45
6.	"Nails, Hair, Hips, Heels"	3:56
7.	"Relove"	4:08
Total length:		24:26

== Charts ==
Chart (2019)	Peak position
US Digital Albums (Billboard)	24
US Heatseekers Albums (Billboard)	11
US Independent Albums (Billboard)	24
US Top Dance Albums (Billboard)	11
