= Todrick Hall =

American entertainer (born 1985)

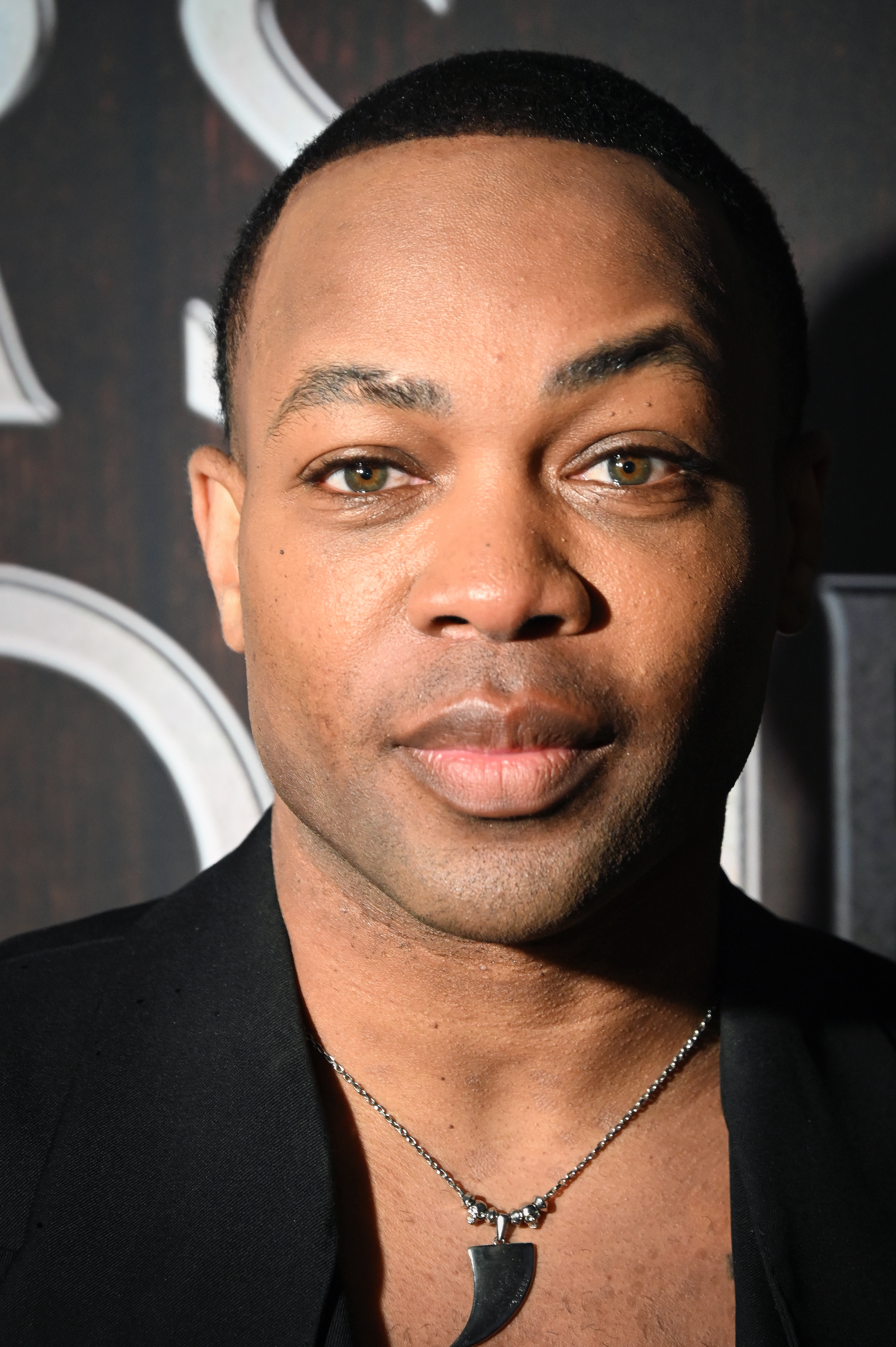
- Hall in 2026
- Born: April 4, 1985 (age 41); Plainview, Texas, U.S.
- Other names: Toddler; Qing Toddy
- Occupations: Singer; rapper; choreographer; YouTuber; actor; dancer
- Years active: 2008–present
- Television: American Idol; RuPaul's Drag Race; The Greatest Dancer; The Masked Singer; Celebrity Big Brother
- Musical career
- Genres: R&B; pop; hip hop; neo-soul
- Labels: Planet Hype; FrtyFve

YouTube information
- Channel: todrickhall
- Years active: 2007–present
- Subscribers: 3.56 million
- Views: 945 million
- Last updated: October 22, 2025
- Website: todrickhall.com

Todrick Hall (born April 4, 1985) is an American singer, performer, dancer, rapper, choreographer, activist and YouTuber. He gained national attention on the ninth season of the televised singing competition American Idol. Following this, he amassed a following on YouTube with original songs, parodies, and skits. A documentary series about his video-making process titled Todrick aired on MTV in 2015.

Starting with season eight, Hall became a resident choreographer and occasional judge on RuPaul's Drag Race. From 2016 to 2017, Hall starred as Lola in Kinky Boots on Broadway. Later in 2017, he began appearances as Billy Flynn in Chicago on Broadway and in the West End. He also appeared as Ogie in Waitress on Broadway in 2019.

Hall has released four studio albums, including the visual albums Straight Outta Oz (2016) and Forbidden (2018). In 2020, he released an EP, Quarantine Queen, and was the international host of Global Pride 2020.

== Early life and education ==
Todrick Hall was born on April 4, 1985, in Plainview, Texas, a farming community in the state's panhandle. He was raised by a single mother until she married when he was a teen, when he gained a brother and stepfather. Later the family would move to Dallas.

As a child, he adored The Wizard of Oz. As an adult, he would create Oz, the Musical; the pop song The Wizard of Ahhhs featuring the pop a cappella quintet Pentatonix; and the visual album and tour Straight Out of Oz. An elementary teacher in Dallas led Hall toward the arts, including theater, the orchestra, and ballet.

Hall is gay, and came out to his family when he was 15. At age 16, he began performing on weekends at the amusement park Six Flags Over Texas; it was the first time he combined singing and dancing. He also performed on cruises with Royal Caribbean, Holland America Line, and at Walt Disney Parks and Resorts. Hall has said that his work ethic comes from the lack of opportunities he had in the entertainment industry as a black gay man.

== Career ==
=== 2006–2010: Broadway, YouTube, American Idol ===
When Hall was twenty he auditioned for the Broadway production of The Color Purple with Oprah Winfrey and Fantasia Barrino. He was cast in the ensemble, and as understudy for the role of Harpo. Barrino rose to fame as the winner of the third season of the reality singing competition American Idol, and working with her would inspire Hall to later audition for the show as well. After The Color Purple he performed in Memphis: The Musical and touring productions of Beauty and the Beast, Radio City Christmas Spectacular featuring the Rockettes, and Hairspray.

Hall relocated to Los Angeles, eventually living in a four-bedroom "nondescript three-story home in the Hollywood Hills". He joined the video-sharing platform YouTube in May 2006, and made over 300 videos in the next five years. His first video, filmed while still living in Texas, was "a hilarious clip of him singing his order to a McDonald's drive-through speaker (complete with backup singers)". The video has since received over ten million views. In 2008 he uploaded a video of a performance of "Hard to Say Goodbye," which boosted his subscribers to two million. YouTube became a full-time pursuit for Hall in 2011. He says the platform showcases "how I can write a song, create the concepts, execute them, direct, choreograph and do hair and makeup" as well as perform. Some of his popular videos were the basis of later concert tours like "Twerk Du Soleil" and the "Toddlerz Ball."

In August 2009, Hall auditioned for the ninth season of American Idol in Dallas, Texas. He sang a self-composed song mentioning the judges – Simon Cowell, Randy Jackson, Kara DioGuardi, and guest judge Joe Jonas – to make his case for inclusion in the program. Years later, reflecting on his Idol experiences, Hall said his "fondest memory" was the audition song. All four approved of his participation; he went into Hollywood week and eventually the semi-finals. In the Top 24, he sang Kelly Clarkson's "Since U Been Gone", and in the Top Twenty performed Tina Turner's "What's Love Got to Do with It". He was eliminated in the Top 16 on March 11, 2010, after his rendition of Queen's "Somebody to Love;" he was one of four contestants eliminated in that round, and thus ranked between 13th and 16th overall. Judge Simon Cowell dismissively told Hall he "wouldn't amount to anything beyond a Broadway actor". Later Hall stated that he regretted hiding his sexuality on the show: he had a girl wait for his post-audition walk outside with his golden ticket.

In August 2010, Hall returned to Broadway in the musical Memphis.

=== 2011–2015: Career growth and YouTube fame ===
Hall's videos include several of his own original songs and music videos and choreographed flash mobs. Hall did a choreographed flash mob in a Target store to Beyoncé's "End of Time" prompting her to hire Hall as a choreographer on her roller-disco video, "Blow" which came out in November 2013.

That same year, Hall was the singer and songwriter for the Virgin America safety video, seen by millions on the now defunct airline.

On October 22, 2014, MTV announced Todrick, a docuseries following Hall, would premiere in 2015. On December 20, 2014, Hall produced and appeared in a commercial for the series and featured other celebrities' holiday wishes. Eight episodes of the docuseries were ordered and aired throughout 2015. The soundtrack for the show was released on October 13, 2015. In October 2015, he was picked as Elvis Duran's Artist of the Month and was featured on NBC's Today, where he performed his single "Wind It Up".

In February 2015, he was featured on VH1's Huge on the Tube series.

=== 2016–2017: Straight Outta Oz, Kinky Boots, and RuPaul's Drag Race ===
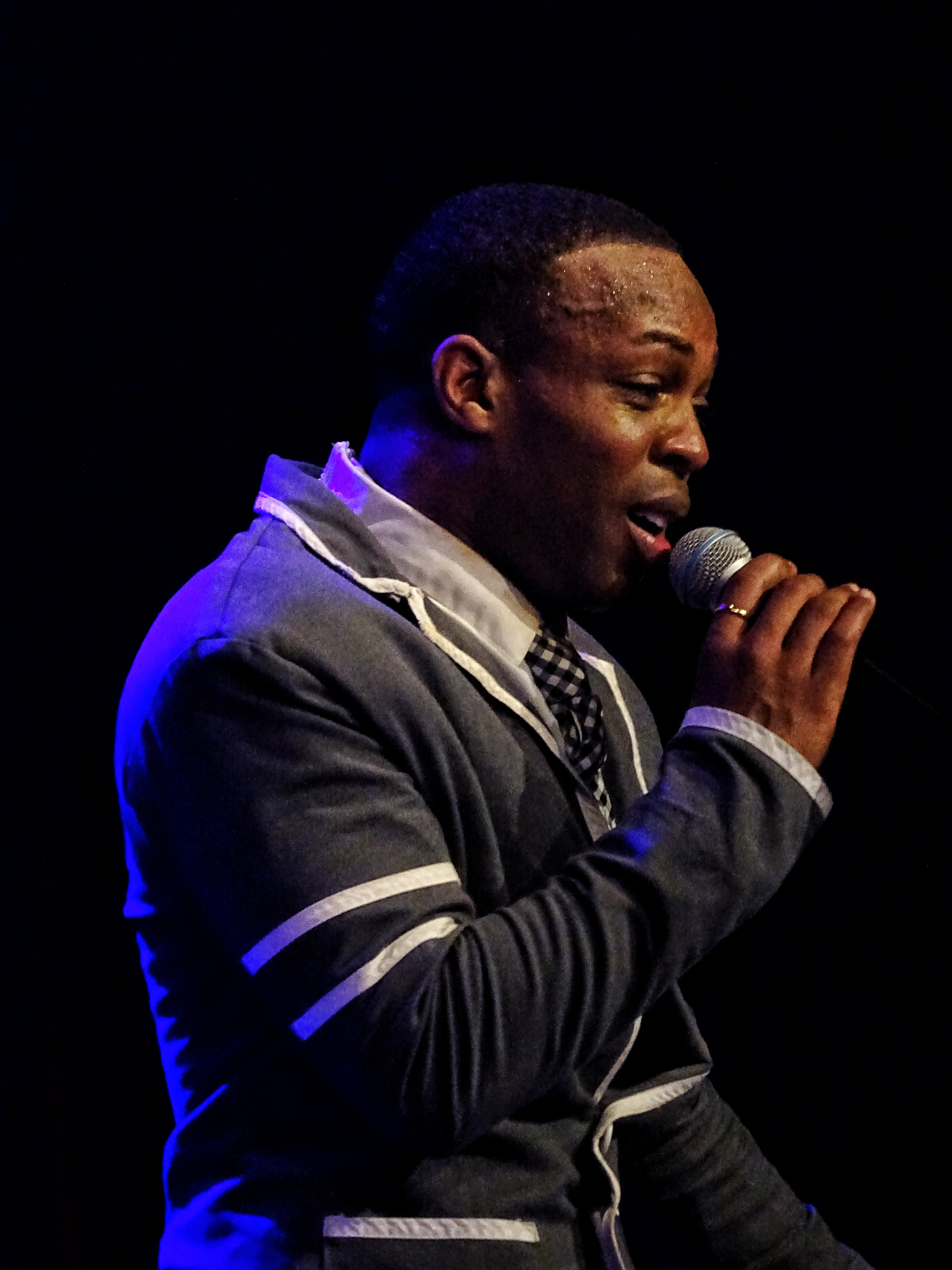
Hall performing in a 2017 concert for the Straight Outta Oz tour in Cologne, Germany.

Hall first appeared as a guest judge on the eighth season of RuPaul's Drag Race for an episode which featured a Wizard of Oz-inspired challenge and aired April 11, 2016; they did not know his lifelong passion for The Wonderful Wizard of Oz. Hall reappeared as a full-time judge for RuPaul's Drag Race All Stars 2 later in 2016 and returned as a recurring guest judge for the ninth season which aired throughout 2017. Along with Drag Race, Hall frequently appeared on Logo TV's game show Gay for Play Game Show Starring RuPaul alongside other celebrities.

On June 23, 2016, Todrick self-released his second album, Straight Outta Oz. The album is a visual concept album that uses the imagery of The Wizard of Oz to explore Todrick's own life and rise to fame. He was inspired to create the project after seeing Disney's Zootopia, Lin-Manuel Miranda's Hamilton, and Beyoncé's visual album Lemonade. The album has seventeen songs, the tour had over twenty; it took about six weeks to write, and then filming the videos happened in two weeks. The project's first video was posted to YouTube on June 23, 2016. The videos had cameos from Kim Chi, Bob the Drag Queen, Willam Belli, Joseph Gordon-Levitt, Nicole Scherzinger, Pentatonix, Perez Hilton, and Amber Riley. "Color" ruminates on his first boyfriend, a handsome Londoner, "the first to really know me." Hall announced the Straight Outta Oz Tour to promote the album which originally ran between July 7, and August 12, 2016 in the United States and Canada. The album debuted in ITunes Top Ten Pop Album Chart after its release in late June 2016.

The Straight Outta Oz Tour was interrupted by Hall's casting in the Broadway musical Kinky Boots. They offered the lead in Kinky Boots "without even auditioning, because they felt my story was so similar to that of Lola's", a drag queen cabaret performer. Hall's performance was well received by critics. He performed 155 shows from November 1, 2016, to March 1, 2017.

The Straight Outta Oz Tour was revived in 2017 and ran between March 30, and June 5, in various North American, European, and Australian locations. It was accompanied by an expanded deluxe edition that included songs that were featured on the tour but not on the original version of the album. Additionally, the album included an extended version and new video for "Wrong Bitch" featuring Bob the Drag Queen, and a rerecorded version of Todrick's previous single "Low" featuring RuPaul. In August 2017, he had a cameo as a back-up dancer in the music video for Taylor Swift's song, "Look What You Made Me Do"; the two had become friends in 2015, and would collaborate on several projects.

From November 30, 2017, to January 14, 2018, played Billy Flynn in a limited engagement role in Chicago. During his tenure, the show had its best-grossing week in its 21-year Broadway history.

In December he released the documentary film Behind the Curtain about the production behind Straight Outta Oz filmed in conjunction with AwesomenessTV who had released a successful documentary about another gay YouTuber Tyler Oakley. It was screened in select theaters and later released on home video. Later that month he had a guest appearance in the Bob's Burgers Season 8 episode "The Bleakening" as drag queen Miss Triple-Xmas (or Cleavage to Beaver) performing the song "Twinkly Lights". He also released a medley of covers of songs from the Pitch Perfect film series that was featured on the Pitch Perfect 3 Special Edition soundtrack.

=== 2018–2020: Forbidden, Haus Party, The Greatest Dancer, and Quarantine Queen ===
In March 2018 he released his new visual album follow-up to Straight Outta Oz called Forbidden. To promote the album, Hall embarked on Forbidden: The Tour across the United States, Europe, Asia, Australia, and New Zealand.

In May 2019, Hall revealed that he will be releasing a trilogy of extended plays to be released across the next six months. The first EP, Haus Party, Pt. 1, with its first single "Glitter" was released May 16, 2019. The EP also contained the single "Nails, Hair, Hips, Heels", with a remix featuring Ciara. The EPs were supported by the Haus Party World Tour. Part Two was originally planned to be released in July 2019 but was delayed to September 19, 2019. It was supported by the singles "Wig", "Fag", and "Dripeesha" (the latter featuring Tiffany Haddish). Part Three was released in February 2021.

On June 17, 2019, Hall appeared in and co-executive produced the music video for singer-songwriter Taylor Swift's song "You Need to Calm Down". Hall also helped recruit guests for the cameo-filled video. In June 2019, Hall announced that he will be returning to Broadway to play Ogie Anhorn in the musical Waitress opposite fellow YouTuber Colleen Ballinger. In August 2019 he joined the panel of Dance Captains for the second series of The Greatest Dancer alongside the other Dance Captains Cheryl, Oti Mabuse and Matthew Morrison. From November 2019 to January 2020 Hall will play the lead, Billy Flynn, in the West End version of the musical Chicago.

In February 2020, Hall released a song for Disneyland's new twice daily parade, called "Magic Happens". Hall "learned to dance by watching Disney parades". On April 27, 2020, Hall announced on social media that he had spent the past week writing and recording an EP entitled Quarantine Queen (themed around the COVID-19 pandemic). The album was released on April 29, 2020. In May 2020 Hall signed with CAA Management. On November 26, 2020, Hall released a live album of the Haus Party world tour recorded in Atlanta, alongside a full video recording for free on YouTube.

=== 2021–2022: Femuline and Algorythm ===
On February 12, 2021, Hall released the third volume of the Haus Party trilogy after being delayed sixteen months past its original release date. On June 8, 2021, Hall released his fourth studio album, Femuline, which was preceded by the singles "Boys in the Ocean" and "Rainin' Fellas". The album is inspired by gay pride and features appearances from Chaka Khan, Tyra Banks, Brandy, Nicole Scherzinger and Ts Madison.

In September 2021, Hall and Samsung teamed up for a remix video of his breakthrough single, "Nails, Hair, Hips, Heels," centered around the new Samsung Galaxy Z Flip3 foldable smartphone. The reworked lyrics -- "Flip, Fold, Snap, Clack"—reference the phone's ability to flip up and fold down.

In December 2021, Hall competed in season six of The Masked Singer as "Bull" and finished in second place.

In January 2022, it was announced that Hall would be participating in the third season of Celebrity Big Brother as a contestant. He made it into the final three and then placed runner up for the season.

On June 1, 2022, Hall released his fifth album, Algorhythm, which was preceded by the single, "Dance Forever".

=== 2024-2025: Burlesque and Midnight ===
In 2024 Hall joined the musical Burlesque in the role of Sean. He also wrote some of the new songs for the show, alongside Jess Folley, who starred as Ali Rose. The show opened at the Opera House in Manchester, toured to Glasgow, to return to Manchester. Ahead of its West End transfer in 2025, the show changed its team, with Hall directing and choreographing, as well as reprising the role of Sean.

In October 2025 Hall announced he will premiere his own original musical, Midnight, at the Sadler's Wells East in London, in November of the same year, after a few close-doors performances in New York and London. Hall wrote the music and lyrics for the show, and also directed, choreographed and starred as lead character Rail. He commented "Midnight is an artistic work with a strong sense of social responsibility and cultural depth. It uses artistic means to call on people to cross racial boundaries, learn to understand, tolerate and empathise." The show opened Off-Broadway in New York at the Daryl Roth Theatre on October 15, 2026.

== Personal life ==
Hall announced a relationship with model David Borum via an Instagram post in May 2021.

== Filmography ==
Television roles
Year	Title	Role	Notes
2010	American Idol	Himself (contestant)	Season 9 – Semi-finalist
2014	Nickelodeon Kid's Choice Awards	Himself	Opening Act
2015–2016	Dance Moms	Himself	3 episodes
2015	Hit RECord on TV	Lead High School Boy	Episode: "Re: school" "What They Say" segment
2015	The World Dog Awards	Himself	Presenter
2015	Catfish: The TV Show	Himself	Episode: "Devan & Rylan"
2015	Todrick	Himself	8 episodes
2016	Dance-Off Juniors	Guest Judge	10 episodes
2016	Sing It!	Milo	Episode: "The Chicken Theory?!"
2016	Christmas All Over Again	Young Breezy	Television film
2016	Todrick Hall: Behind the Curtain	Himself; Producer	Documentary film on the making of Straight Outta Oz
2016–2017	Gay for Play Game Show Starring RuPaul	Himself (Guest Panelist)	3 Episodes
2016–2019	RuPaul's Drag Race	Himself (Guest Judge & Choreographer)	7 Episodes
2016–2020	RuPaul's Drag Race: All Stars	Himself (Judge & Choreographer)	Main Panel (Season 2); Guest judge & choreographer (Seasons 3–5)
2017	Wild 'n Out	Himself	Episode: "LeSean McCoy/Todrick Hall/SNS & KidTheWiz"
2017	Sound it Out: The Untitled LGBT Documentary	Himself	
2017	Bob's Burgers	Miss Triple X-Mas (voice)	Episode: "The Bleakening"
2018	Muppet Babies	Carlos (voice)	Episode: "Frogs of a Feather"
2018	Dear White People		Volume 2, "Chapter III"
2018	Queer Eye	Himself	Episode: "Sky's the Limit"
2018	RuPaul's Drag Race Holi-slay Spectacular	Himself (Judge)	Television special
2019	Crazy Ex-Girlfriend	Funky Cat	Episode: "I Need Some Balance"
2020	The Greatest Dancer	Dance Captain	
2021	The Masked Singer	Bull/Himself	Season 6 contestant; Second place
2022	Celebrity Big Brother	Himself (HouseGuest/Contestant)	Runner-up
2023	The Real Friends of WeHo	Himself	
2023	Pupstruction	Harvey Hare	Episode: "Luna's Bad Hair Day"

Theatre roles
Year	Title	Role	Theatre	Notes
2007-2008	The Color Purple	Bobby, Harpo (understudy), ensemble	Broadway Theatre	Broadway
2010–2011	Memphis	Gator (understudy), ensemble	Sam S. Shubert Theatre	Broadway
2011	Hairspray	Ensemble		Hollywood Bowl
2011	Hairspray	Seaweed J. Stubbs		Los Angeles
2014	Cats	Rum Tum Tugger	Lubbock	Regional
2016–2017	Kinky Boots	Lola/Simon	Al Hirshfeld Theater	Broadway
2017–2018	Chicago	Billy Flynn	Ambassador Theatre	Broadway
2018	Chicago	Billy Flynn	US tour	US tour
2018–2019	Chicago	Billy Flynn	Phoenix Theatre	West End
2019	Waitress	Ogie Anhorn	Brooks Atkinson Theatre	Broadway
2020	Kinky Boots	Lola/Simon		Los Angeles
2024	Burlesque	Sean	Manchester Opera House and Theatre Royal, Glasgow	Regional; also co-composer and lyricist
2025	Burlesque	Sean	Savoy Theatre	West End; also director, choreographer, co-composer and lyricist
2025	Midnight	Rail	Sadler's Wells East	Off West End: also director, choreographer, composer and lyricist

Web roles
Year	Title	Role	Notes
2019	Step Up: High Water	Himself	Guest Appearance (Season 2 Episode 4: "Vogue")

== Discography ==
- Somebody's Christmas (2010)
- Straight Outta Oz (2016)
- Forbidden (2018)
- Femuline (2021)
- Algorhythm (2022)
- Jim (2023)

== Tours ==
- Twerk du Soleil (2013)
- Twerk the Halls (2014)
- Toddlerz Ball (2015)
- Straight Outta Oz (2016–2017)
- Forbidden: The Tour (2018)
- Haus Party Tour (2019 & 2021)
- The Femuline World Tour (2022)

== Awards and recognition ==
- 2014, named to Forbes' 30 Under 30 list.
- 2015, Business Insider's list of the "Hottest YouTube Stars Alive".
- 2016 Streamy Awards, Music Award for Breakthrough Artist, winner.
- 2019 MTV Video Music Award for collaboration on Taylor Swift's "You Need to Calm Down", winner as executive producer.
