= Sadler's Wells East =

Theatre in Stratford, London

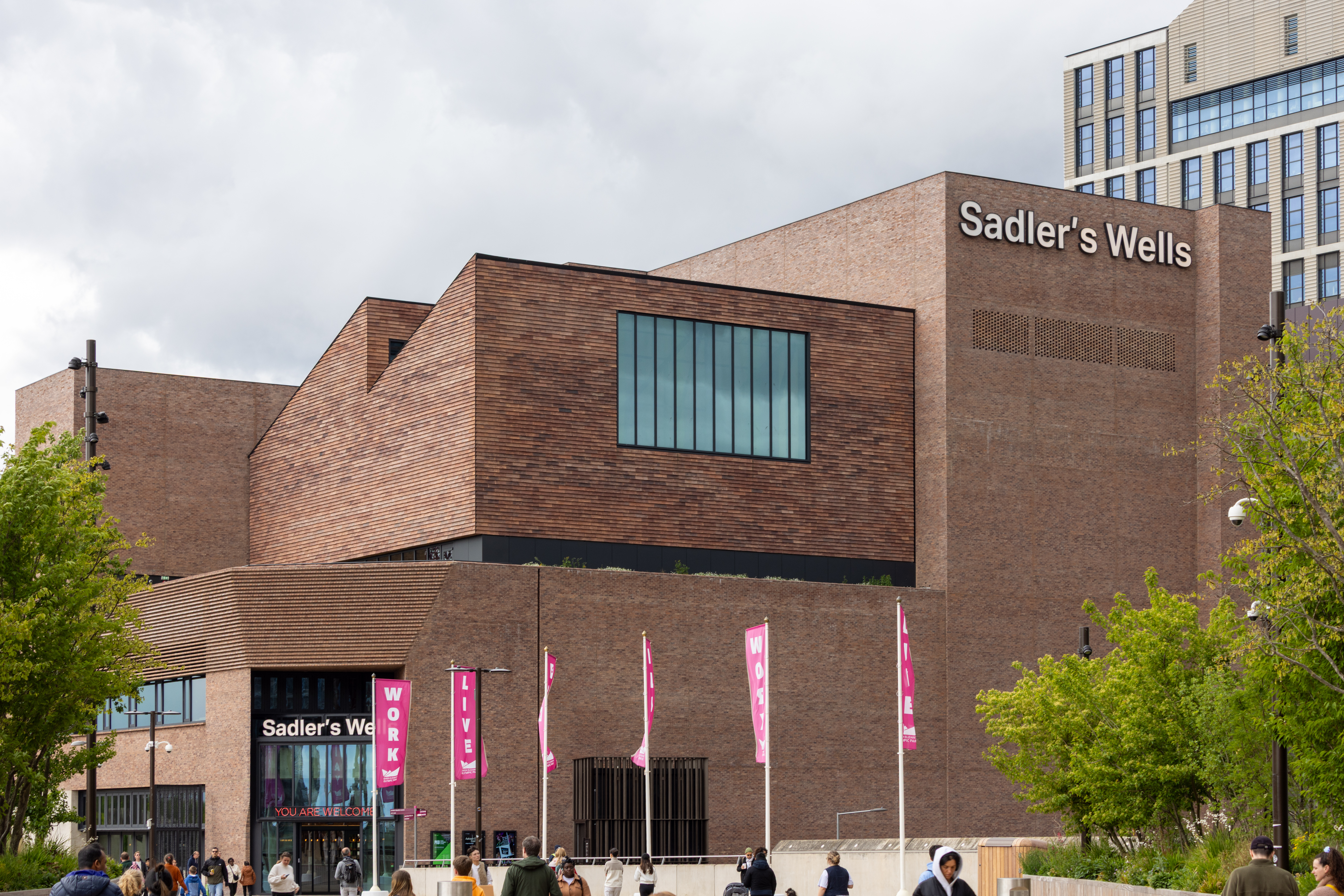
- Sadler's Wells East in 2025
- Interactive map of Sadler's Wells East
- Address: Queen Elizabeth Olympic Park, Stratford, London
- Location: London, United Kingdom
- Coordinates: 51°32′28″N 0°00′42″W
- Owner: Sadler's Wells
- Capacity: 550
- Type: Dance theatre

Construction
- Opened: 16 January 2025
- Architect: O'Donnell & Tuomey

Sadler's Wells East is a dance theatre in Stratford, London. It opened to the public on 16 January 2025 as part of the East Bank cultural district. The theatre acts as a satellite venue for the original Sadler's Wells Theatre in Islington that focuses on in-house dance production and choreographer training.

== History ==
Development of Sadler’s Wells East was announced in June 2018 as part of the Mayor of London’s £1.1 billion "East Bank" project, which was a cultural regeneration initiative within the Queen Elizabeth Olympic Park.

Dublin-based firm O'Donnell + Tuomey were commissioned to design the building following their work on the adjacent V&A East Museum. Construction was overseen by the London Legacy Development Corporation, and the completed building became one of the founding institutions to open within the East Bank district.

The London Mayor Sadiq Khan attended the opening ceremony on 6 February 2025.

== Facilities ==
Sadler’s Wells East includes six dance studios, a 550-seat theatre, two cafes and bars, and rehearsal spaces. Two programmes are based within the building:

- Academy Breakin’ Convention, a full-time Level 3 Extended Diploma in Hip Hop Theatre for students aged 16 to 19.
- Rose Choreographic School, a postgraduate-level research programme that offers a two-year research project for dance artists seeking to develop new choreographic practices.

In 2024, the venue implemented a hiring initiative to fill 50% of its new staff positions with local residents from the London boroughs of Hackney, Newham, Waltham Forest and Tower Hamlets.

== Architecture ==
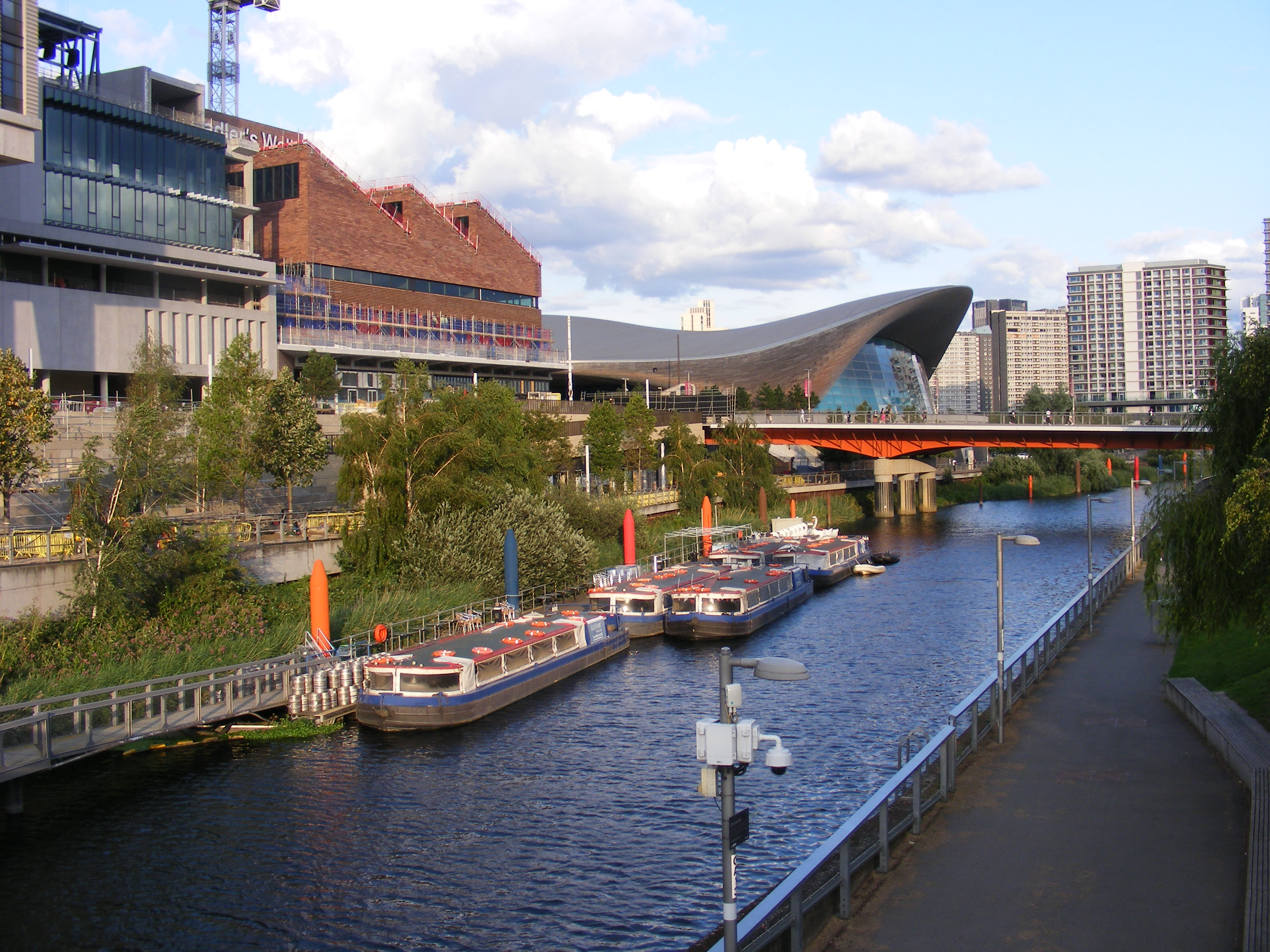
East Bank under construction in July 2023

The building is finished with Italian red brick walls, sourced from the Sant'Anselmo works near Venice. The exterior features sawtooth roofing which is designed to reference the industrial heritage of the Stratford area.

The interior includes an L-shaped foyer overlooking the Waterworks River and an indoor performance space known as "The Dance Floor". The 550-seat auditorium has the same stage dimensions as the main Islington theatre, so productions can easily transfer between the two venues. The theatre includes retractable seating to allow the stage to be more flexibly configured.

=== Reception ===
Architecture critic Rowan Moore reviewed the building for The Observer, describing the design of the building as a series of "piled-up and interlocking rectangular boxes." He characterized the atmosphere as "workmanlike" and noted the brickwork contrasted to the glassy exterior of adjacent developments such as Westfield Stratford City. While Moore praised the interior foyer for its functionality, he described the entrance as "possibly a bit too blunt". The building received a 2026 RIBA National Award.

== Performances ==
The inaugural production was Our Mighty Groove by choreographer Vicki Igbokwe-Ozoagu, featuring performers from the company Uchenna Dance along with local participants. The opening season included eight United Kingdom premieres and ten Sadler’s Wells co-productions.

Artists and companies featured included Ivan Michael Blackstock (TRAPLORD), Botis Seva (Until We Sleep), Phoenix Dance Theatre (Inside Giovanni’s Room), BRB2, Candoco Dance Company, HUMANHOOD, Aakash Odedra, Matsena Productions and Theatre Royal Stratford East in a co-production of Romeo and Juliet by Kwame Owusu. International presentations included works by Trajal Harrell, Mette Ingvartsen, Mythili Prakash, Sharon Eyal, and Emma Martin.

During the summer of 2025, the venue hosted the YFX Youth Festival, a two-week event held jointly with the Islington theatre, presenting performances by the National Youth Dance Company and participants in the U.Dance national showcase.

== See also ==
- Sadler's Wells Theatre
- Queen Elizabeth Olympic Park
