= Charles Byrne (giant) =

Irish entertainer (1761–1783)

Charles O'Brien
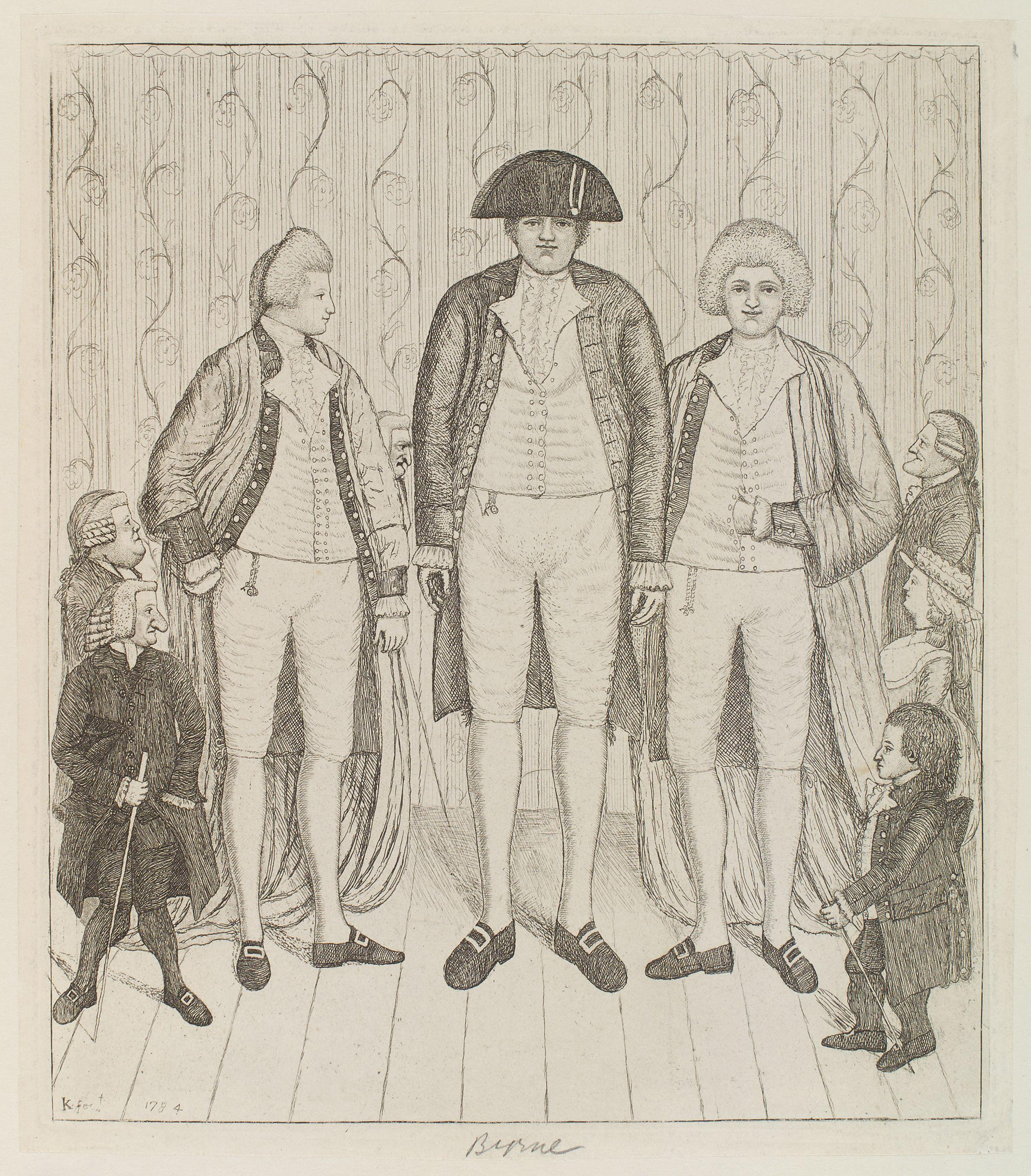
- Byrne in a John Kay etching (1784), alongside the Brothers Knipe, and Andrew Bell, Baillie Kid, James Burnett, Lord Monboddo and William Richardson
- Born: 1761
- Died: 1 June 1783 (aged 21–22); London, England, Great Britain
- Resting place: London, England, United Kingdom

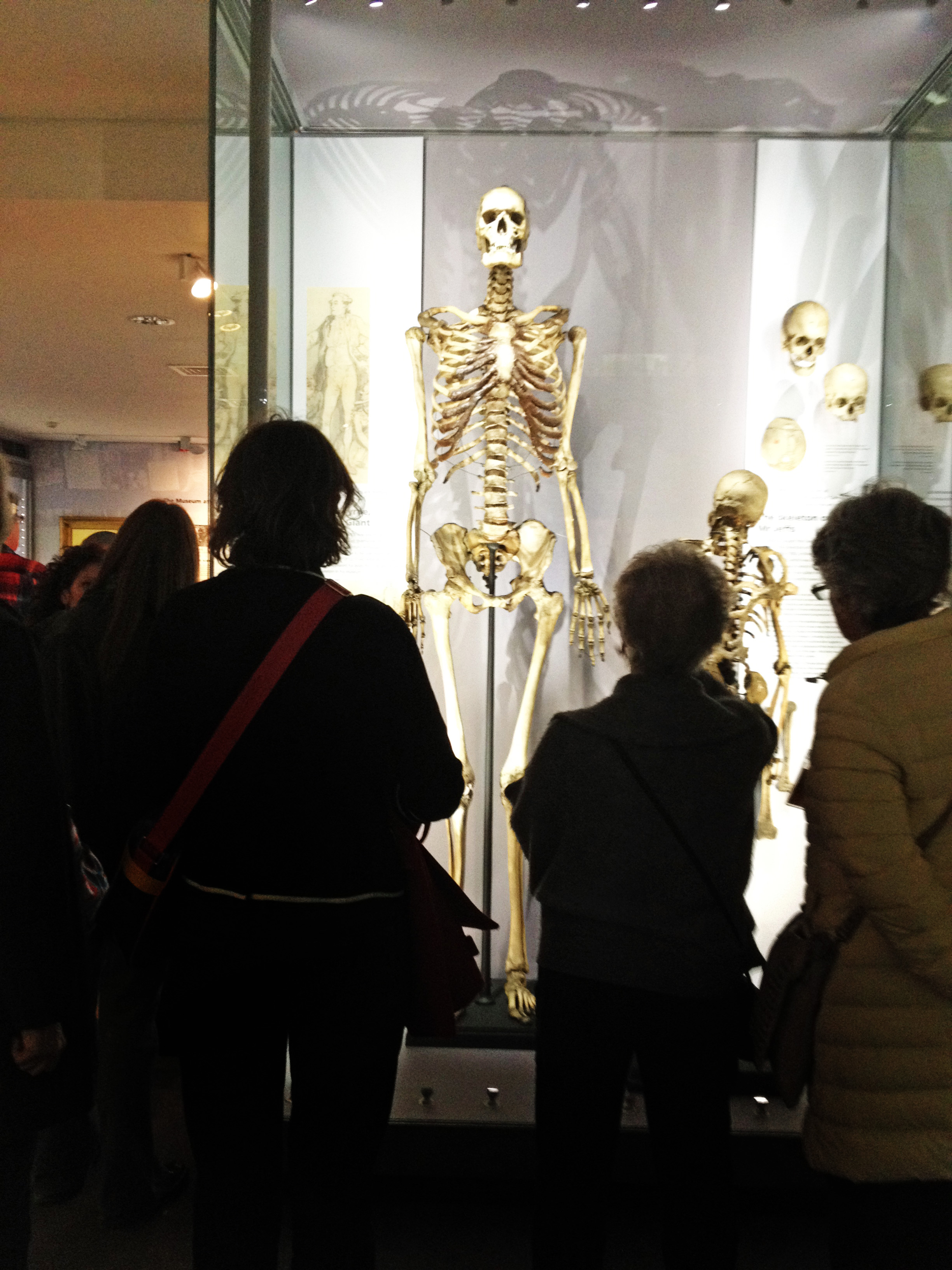
The skeleton of the 7 ft 7 in (2.31 m) tall Byrne displayed at the Royal College of Surgeons of England in London

Charles Byrne (probable real name: Charles O'Brien; 1761 – 1 June 1783), or "The Irish Giant", was a man regarded as a curiosity or freak in London in the 1780s for his large stature. Byrne's exact height is of some conjecture. Some accounts refer to him as being 8 ft 2 in (2.49 m) to 8 ft 4 in (2.54 m) tall, but skeletal evidence places him at just over 7 ft 7 in (2.31 m).

His skeleton was on display at the Hunterian Museum in London from 1799 until it was removed from public display in 2023.

== Early life ==
Byrne's family lived near the hamlet of Littlebridge in the south of County Londonderry in Ulster. (Note: Littlebridge, not far from the north-western shores of Lough Neagh, is in the townland of Drummullan and is just over 4 miles (6.4 km) east of Cookstown. The hamlet of Littlebridge is very close to County Londonderry's boundary with County Tyrone.) Some accounts say that Byrne was largely raised in the part of east County Tyrone that lies directly to the south of Littlebridge. It is said that Byrne had been conceived on top of a haystack, and that this was the cause of his great height. Little is known of Byrne's family other than that his parents were ordinary people, and that they were not unusually tall. Some sources say that Byrne's father worked as a weaver, while his mother may have been Scottish.

By his late teens, Byrne had decided to set off for Great Britain in pursuit of fame and fortune. Landing first in Scotland, he became an instant success. As Eric Cubbage has recounted, Edinburgh's "night watchmen were amazed at the sight of him lighting his pipe from one of the streetlamps on North Bridge without even standing on tiptoe."

== Fame ==
His celebrity spread as he made his way down northern England, arriving in London in early 1782, aged 21. There he entertained paying audiences at rooms in Spring Garden-gate, then Piccadilly, and lastly Charing Cross. He was the toast of the town; a 6 May 1782 newspaper report stated: "However striking a curiosity may be, there is generally some difficulty in engaging the attention of the public; but even this was not the case with the modern living Colossus, or wonderful Irish Giant."

His gentle, likeable nature inspired an immense public fondness, and his celebrity life was constantly splashed across the newspapers of the day. "The wonderful Irish Giant... is the most extraordinary curiosity ever known, or ever heard of in history; and the curious in all countries where he has been shewn, pronounce him to be the finest display of Human nature they ever saw". By mid-1782, he had inspired a hit London stage show called Harlequin Teague, or the Giant's Causeway.

== Death ==
Byrne's great height was the result of a then-undiscovered growth disorder, known today as acromegaly or acromegalic gigantism, and his health declined sharply in his twenty-second year. He was also pickpocketed in this period while drinking in his local pub, the Black Horse. Byrne's worldly earnings of £700 (equivalent to £91,250 in 2025) were on his person in the form of banknotes, and were stolen. The loss of his earnings exacerbated his failing health, and two months later Byrne died, at his lodgings at Cockspur Street, Charing Cross, London, on 1 June 1783, aged 22.

== After death ==
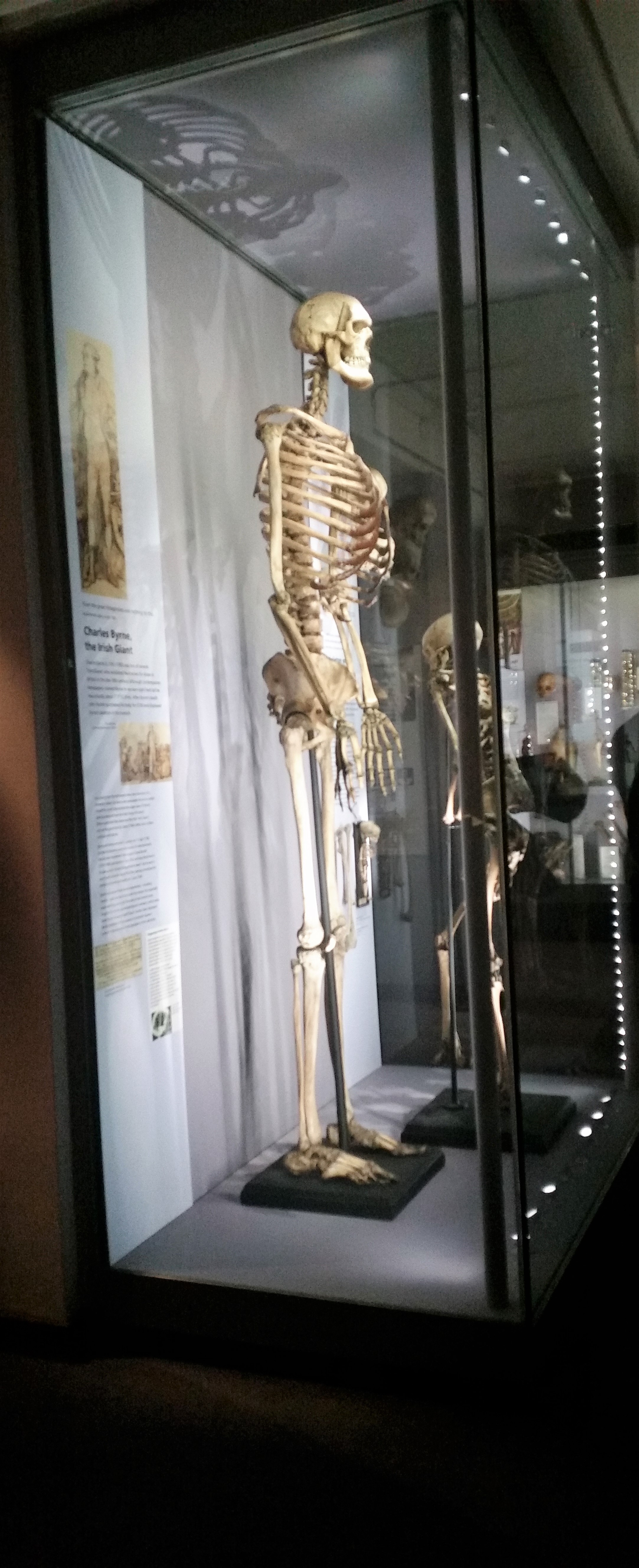
The skeleton of Charles Byrne

Byrne was living in London at the same time as the pre-eminent surgeon and anatomist John Hunter. Hunter had a reputation for collecting unusual specimens for his private museum, and Hunter had offered to pay Byrne for his corpse. As Byrne's health deteriorated, and knowing that Hunter wanted his body for dissection (a fate reserved at that time for executed criminals) and probable display, Byrne devised a plan. He made express arrangements with friends that when he died his body would be sealed in a lead coffin and taken to the coastal town of Margate and then to a ship for burial at sea. Byrne's wishes were thwarted and his worst fears realised when Hunter arranged for the cadaver to be snatched on its way to Margate. The coffin was made and measured 9 feet 4 inches in length, but Hunter nevertheless acquired the body.

Hunter then reduced Byrne's corpse to its skeleton and four years later put Byrne's skeleton on display in his Hunterian Museum. His 2.31 m (7 ft 7 in) skeleton was purchased in 1799 by the Hunterian Museum at the Royal College of Surgeons in London and it was then displayed for nearly two centuries.

In 2011, calls were made in the British Medical Journal by Len Doyal, Emeritus Professor of Medical Ethics at Queen Mary, University of London, and law lecturer Thomas Muinzer to put an end to the unethical display of Byrne's skeleton at the museum and for it to be buried at sea "as Byrne intended for himself". The article argued that Byrne's DNA had been taken and could be used in further research, but that it was now time to respect Byrne's burial wishes and attempt to morally rectify what happened.

A public poll conducted on the BMJ's website over December 2011—January 2012 in response to the article "Should the Skeleton of 'the Irish Giant' Be Buried at Sea?" by Doyal and Muinzer offered people the chance to vote on what they thought should happen to Byrne's remains. Doyal and Muinzer reported: "On the last count that we saw before voting ceased, 55.6% (310) voted for burial at sea; 13.17% (74) for removal from display and being kept for research; and 31.55% (176) for the status quo."

The BMJ article was widely reported and the resulting swell of public support for the campaign forced The Royal College of Surgeons to formally consider whether it should release Byrne's skeleton, the showpiece of their Hunterian Museum, in February 2012. They decided to continue the exhibit.

A further academic article was published in the International Journal of Cultural Property which deals with the legal issues raised by the display of Byrne's skeleton and contains new fieldwork carried out in Byrne's native townland of Drummullan, where the hamlet of Littlebridge is located. The article again calls for the release of Byrne's skeleton from his captor's museum on moral grounds and for a burial to be carried out in Byrne's homeland at, or as near as possible to, the Giant's Grave, a local site where folk tradition suggests Byrne wished to be buried. The article explains that as the legal system stands, people have no legal power to direct what will happen to their remains following death, and so rely on their loved ones to carry out their burial wishes so that they are buried with respect and dignity.

In May 2015, the then Mayor of Derry, Martin Reilly, wrote to the museum's trustees advocating for "the importance of respecting the wishes of Mr Byrne in relation to his burial". In March 2017, Dr. Thomas Muinzer appeared in an interview on the NPR programme All Things Considered for a piece entitled "The saga of the Irish Giant's Bones dismays Medical Ethicists". On 6 June 2018, speaking on behalf of the campaign, Muinzer published an article in The Conversation entitled "Why a London museum should return the stolen bones of an Irish giant" as a result of recent developments with the case.

Following renewed pressure from campaigners, The Guardian reported in a 2018 article entitled "'Irish giant' may finally get respectful burial after 200 years on display" that the Trustees of the Hunterian Museum have confirmed that they will consider whether to release the skeleton of Charles Byrne for burial. A spokesperson for the Royal College of Surgeons said "The Hunterian Museum will be closed [from late 2016] until 2021 and Charles Byrne's skeleton is not currently on display. The board of trustees of the Hunterian collection will be discussing the matter during the period of closure of the museum".

Carla Valentine, technical curator of the Pathology Museum at Queen Mary University, London, said: "Now that it's out there that they're considering this, I think it will be difficult to go back from that".

In May 2021, Mary Lowth, a physician and law researcher at King's College, London, published an article entitled 'Charles Byrne, Last Victim of the Bodysnatchers, the Legal Case for Burial' in the Medical Law Review. The article set out a proposed legal case for Byrne's burial, based on common law principles mainly drawn from corpse disposal law. It suggested that, were a person seeking to arrange Byrne's sea burial to challenge the Hunterian Museum in an English court for lawful possession of his remains, the court would grant them this possession. She further argued in 2022 that English law has always prioritised the dignity of the human corpse, treating it as if it is still to some degree a person owed human dignity, and that it would do so for Byrne if the current situation were challenged - noting that the law can only intervene in such a matter if asked.

On 11 January 2023, the Hunterian Museum announced official retirement of Byrne's skeleton from public display. The museum instead will display an oil portrait of John Hunter by painter Sir Joshua Reynolds, completed in 1789. This portrait features the feet of Byrne's skeleton hanging above Hunter in the upper righthand corner.

== Medical condition ==
The American surgeon Harvey Cushing studied Byrne's bones in 1909 and found that Byrne had had a pituitary tumour based on an enlarged pituitary fossa. In 2011, British and German researchers determined the cause of Byrne's gigantism. They extracted DNA from Byrne's teeth and found that he had a rare mutation in his AIP gene that is involved in pituitary tumours. The researchers found that four contemporary families living in Northern Ireland which have a history of related pituitary disorders also carried this mutation. The researchers inferred that Byrne and these families had a common ancestor about 57 to 66 generations ago (1,425 to 1,650 years ago).

== Legacy ==
Author Dame Hilary Mantel wrote a fictionalised novel of his life in The Giant, O'Brien, published in 1998. The plot of the novel focused on the battle between the revolution of science and the ways of poem and song. O'Brien (Byrne) was portrayed as a man whose faith was in tales of kings and the little people, while his polar opposite John Hunter was portrayed as at the dawn of the scientific age, destroying all that is old and cherished. It mentions that O'Brien (Byrne) was related to another Irish giant in Patrick Cotter O'Brien of County Cork, who exhibited himself shortly after the death of Byrne, stating that he was 8'7" in height.

An exhumation of Patrick O'Brien's bones in 1972 showed that his true height was 8'1". The book mentions a sort of kinship with two other Irish giants known simply as 'The Brothers Knipe' who both stood 7'2" each. They were recognised by the Guinness Book of World Records as the tallest identical twins in history. In 2010, poet Moyra Donaldson from Northern Ireland published the anthology Miracle Fruit which featured a poem inspired by Charles Byrne called 'The Skeleton of the Great Irish Giant'.

Author Tessa Harris made him one of the main characters in her novel The Dead Shall Not Rest, which examines the beginnings of forensic science, anatomy and surgery. The book emphasises the difficulties that anatomists of the time had in gaining access to bodies to dissect, and the resulting illegal trade in dead bodies.

He is mentioned in chapter 32 of Charles Dickens' novel David Copperfield, to illustrate the enormousness of an umbrella: "But her face, as she turned it up to mine, was so earnest; and when I relieved her of the umbrella (which would have been an inconvenient one for the Irish Giant), she wrung her little hands in such an afflicted manner; that I rather inclined towards her."

Pat Murphy's 1990 novella Bones is a fictionalized account of Byrne's life, with elements of magic realism. It won the World Fantasy Award for best novella and was nominated for the Nebula Award and the Hugo Award.

On 2017, Irish songwriter Seamus Fogarty released a song about Byrne - "A Short Ballad for a Long Man", with a video by Kieran Evans.

In June 2023, an opera about Byrne by composer Sarah Angliss called Giant premiered at Snape Maltings in the UK.

== See also ==
- List of tallest people
- Patrick Cotter O'Brien
