= Vacant Possession =

Vacant Possession may refer to:

- Vacant possession, legal term
- Vacant Possession (film), 1995 film
- Vacant Possession (novel), 1986 novel
