= Maxwell Garthshore =

Scottish physician

Maxwell Garthshore FRSE LRCP (28 October 1732 – 1 March 1812) was a Scottish physician and Fellow of the Royal Society of Edinburgh.

== Early life ==
The son of the George Garthshore, a minister in Kirkcudbright, he was born there on 28 October 1732. After being educated at the Kirkcudbright grammar school, he was apprenticed to a medical man in Edinburgh at the age of fourteen, and attended medical classes in the university. Before proceeding to his degree, Garthshore entered the army as surgeon's mate when in his twenty-second year. In 1756 he settled at Uppingham, succeeding (with the support of his cousin, Robert Maitland, a prosperous London merchant) to the practice of John Fordyce.

After practising at Uppingham for eight years, Garthshore was encouraged to move to London, and to support his position there he graduated M.D. at Edinburgh 8 May 1764, and was admitted a licentiate of the London College of Physicians on 1 October 1764. He obtained a large practice as an accoucheur and was appointed physician to the British Lying-in Hospital in London. He became a Fellow of the Royal Society, on 23 March 1775, and of the Antiquarian Society of London.

In 1792 he was elected a Fellow of the Royal Society of Edinburgh. His proposers were James Gregory, Daniel Rutherford, and Sir James Hall.

He was a fashionable physician of the old school, a sincere Christian, and a generous donor. Anne Hunter, widow of John Hunter, received provision from him. He died on 1 March 1812, and was buried in Bunhill Fields cemetery.

Garthshore bore a striking resemblance to William Pitt, 1st Earl of Chatham, and was once pointed out in a debate in the House of Commons as the earl, whom every one believed to be present. His portrait, by Slater, was engraved by Joseph Collyer. His bust by John Bacon was exhibited at the Royal Academy in 1804.

== Works ==
His publications were:

- his inaugural dissertation at Edinburgh, ‘De papaveris usu … in parturientibus ac puerperis,’ 1764;
- two papers read before the Society of Physicians in 1769, and published in the fourth and fifth volumes of ‘Medical Observations;’
- some ‘Observations on Extra-uterine Cases, and Ruptures of the Tubes and Uterus,’ published in the ‘London Medical Journal,’ 1787; and
- ‘A Remarkable Case of Numerous Births,’ Philosophical Transactions, vol. lxxvii.

== Family ==
His first wife, who brought him the small estate of Ruscoe in Kirkcudbrightshire, died in 1765, leaving him one son surviving. His second wife, Mrs. Murrel, whom he married in 1795, died some years before him. The member of parliament William Garthshore was his son.
