= Patrick Cotter O'Brien =

Irish giant

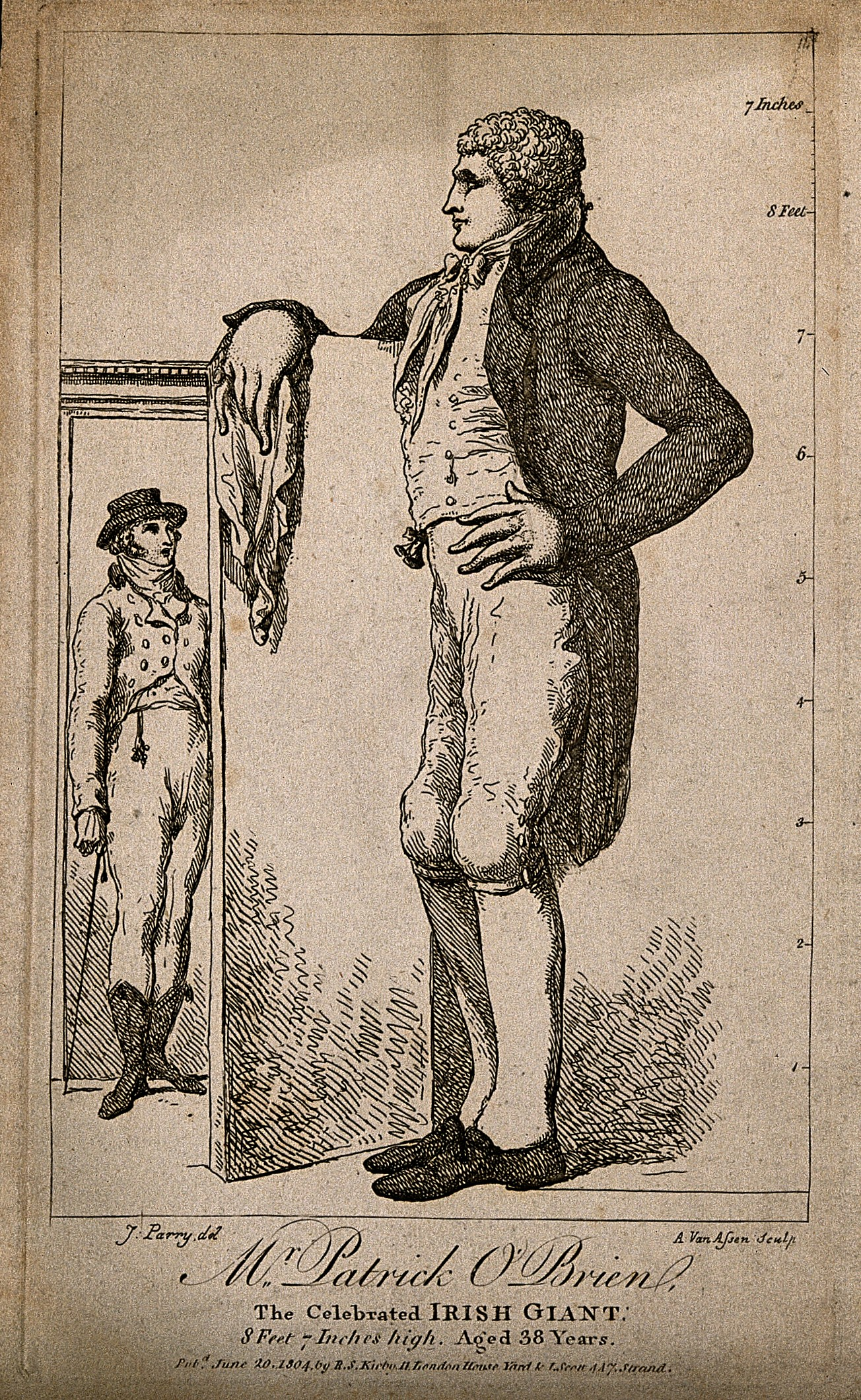
Patrick O'Brien

Patrick Cotter O'Brien (19 January 1760 – 8 September 1806) was the second of 29 known people in medical history to have verifiably reached a height of 8 feet (240 cm) or more. O'Brien was born in Kinsale, County Cork, Ireland. His real name was Patrick Cotter and he adopted O'Brien as his stage name in the sideshow circus, claiming descent from the legendarily gigantic Brian Boru. He was also known as the Bristol Giant and the Irish Giant. Another giant of this period, Charles Byrne, also claimed to be an O'Brien.

He made enough money to retire in 1804 and lived in Hotwells, Bristol until his death. It is believed that he died from the effects of the disease gigantism.

No hearse could be found to accommodate his eight-foot-four-inch (254 cm) casket encased in lead, and his remains were borne to the grave by relays of fourteen men. In his will, Cotter left £2,000 to his mother and a request that his body be entombed within twelve feet (370 cm) of solid rock (to prevent exhumation for scientific or medical research).

His grave remained undisturbed for just short of 100 years until March 1906 when workmen accidentally discovered his coffin whilst laying drains. His remains, after being measured and photographed by Edward Fawcett, were reburied.

In 1972 his remains, exhumed again, were examined and it was determined that, whilst alive, he stood approximately 8 feet 0 inches (244 cm) tall. This made him the tallest person ever at that time, a record that would be surpassed by the next 'eight-footer', John Rogan, who died almost a century later. Patrick Cotter's giant boots are on display in the Kinsale Museum.

An arm of Cotter's is currently preserved in the Hunterian Museum, London.

== See also ==
- List of tallest people
- Charles Byrne
