= A Place of Greater Safety =

1992 novel by Hilary Mantel

- First edition
- Author: Hilary Mantel
- Cover artist: Joseph Boze - "Portrait of Camille Desmoulins"; Eugène Delacroix - "Liberty Leading the People"
- Language: English
- Genre: Historical novel
- Published: 1992 (Viking Press)
- Publication place: United Kingdom
- ISBN: 0-312-42639-9

A Place of Greater Safety is a 1992 novel by Hilary Mantel. It concerns the events of the French Revolution, focusing on the lives of Georges Danton, Camille Desmoulins, and Maximilien Robespierre from their childhood through the execution of the Dantonists. The narrative features not only the perspectives of leading personalities of the French Revolution but also those of their wives, lovers, parents, and friends, supplemented by descriptions of ceremonies, conspiracies, street fights, trials, and debates in the National Convention and the Jacobin Club.

== Plot ==
High tax burdens, poor harvests, and the newly won independence of the United States fueled calls in France for the abolition of the feudal system. In the spring of 1789, the Estates-General met for the first time within the framework of the National Assembly in Versailles to discuss the redistribution of power between the nobility, clergy, and the third estate. Maximilien Robespierre, a delegate of the third estate for the city of Arras, found allies in fellow lawyers Georges Danton and Camille Desmoulins. In the fight for their common cause, the three took on leading roles in the course of the French Revolution.

Desmoulins, in a passionate speech in a café, called on the already agitated and violence-ready crowd to arm themselves – two days later, the people stormed the Bastille. The tactically brilliant and morally flexible pragmatist Danton soon proved to be an important pillar for the First French Republic, which now had to defend itself against attacks from the remaining European monarchies. In the summer of 1792, Danton achieved a decisive victory in the First Coalition War against Austria and Prussia over the allied army, in part by bribing the Duke of Brunswick with the crown jewels. A year later, in the summer of 1793, Robespierre's great moment finally arrived: He took over the chairmanship of the Committee of Public Safety, which now functioned as the executive body of the National Convention, passed death sentences on opposition members, and sanctioned terror measures to suppress counter-revolutionary activities.

The first victims of the guillotine were the former king and queen, then various factions within the revolutionary party. Desmoulins had to watch with increasing horror as his pamphlets were quoted to condemn his friends and companions. He turned against the Reign of Terror in new pamphlets and thus became a target himself, as did Danton, around whom corruption allegations were gathering.

For a while, Robespierre managed to protect Danton and Desmoulins from the hostility of their political opponents, although he risked his own reputation in doing so. But Robespierre's own position eventually became increasingly precarious, while forces obsessed with ideological purity around him, such as Antoine de Saint-Just, gained influence. A rumor about another sexual misconduct by Danton finally gave Robespierre the reason to definitively break with his former friends and approve their execution.

== Themes ==
=== Fact and fiction ===
In an interview, Mantel emphasized the importance of careful personal research using original sources for her working method, to develop her own perspective independent of conventional historical accounts; she expressed regret at not having become a historian herself. A high density of facts also characterizes the novel A Place of Greater Safety: many details are based on historical evidence. Mantel states that wherever possible, she used the original wording from the writings and speeches of the historical figures. However, the novel also contains many freely invented elements – especially regarding the protagonists' childhood in the French provinces and their later interpersonal entanglements. Mantel sets the course for their later careers in these imagined childhoods – explaining their political ambitions through early childhood experiences: Camille's rebellious streak stems from a difficult relationship with his own father; Robespierre early on sides with the disenfranchised because he (wrongly) suspects himself of being illegitimate; Danton's intimidating and daring aura is shaped by his imposing physical presence and face scarred from a childhood accident. By giving readers insight into the imagined childhood and psyche of these historical personalities, Mantel emphasizes the fictionality of her characters.

=== Privatization of the political, politicization of the private ===
Fictional elements come to the foreground in the novel especially when it comes to elaborating the private lives of the characters. The blurring boundaries between fact and fiction, historical personality and fictional character lead to blurring boundaries between political and private spheres. Central events of the French Revolution – the storming of the Bastille, the flight to Varennes, the proclamation of the first French Republic, the trial of the king, the First Coalition War, the Reign of Terror – are not embedded within a comprehensive historical narrative, but presented as episodes in the private lives of the protagonists, especially in terms of their impact on their marriages, affairs, friendships, and lifestyles. The most consequential political decisions in the novel are made in private settings under the influence of personal emotions.

The flip side of the privatization of the political is the invasion of politics into the private – at the height of the Terror, entire families fall victim to the guillotine. Lucile Desmoulins is executed shortly after her husband, although she herself was never politically active. But before the bitter end comes adventure. Mantel tells the experience of living through a revolution as a private experience and thus captures the personal appeal of revolution for risk-seeking temperaments. In her portrayal, the revolution appears, if only at the beginning, as an exciting, stimulating, life-enriching experience that can be particularly attractive to already privileged people seeking an escape from their routines.

=== Limits of individual agency ===
A central aspect of the novel is the problematization of revolutionary agency. Precisely in key moments, when the most is at stake, the figures who are usually attributed a decisive role in historiography are portrayed by Mantel as strangely passive, more carried along by events than actively shaping them. An exemplary case is the description of Desmoulins' speech at the Palais Royal, in which he calls the people to arms. Desmoulins acts almost as if remote-controlled – someone behind him suggests addressing the assembled crowd, three unknown young men start the call to arms, the call is taken up by the crowd, someone presses a weapon into Desmoulins' own hand. Robespierre's and Danton's political decisions also appear in a dubious light at critical moments: Danton, for all his passion for the republic, allows himself to be bribed by the French court and foreign powers, and the financially incorruptible Robespierre proves susceptible to a distortion of his judgment through personal jealousy. The lack of influence of the leading personalities at decisive moments, Danton's questionable financial conduct, and Robespierre's sexual inferiority complexes direct the reader's attention to possible ulterior motives and secret agendas behind the idealistic revolutionary facade.

== Form ==
The narrative technique is characterized by rapid changes in narrative perspectives, sometimes given in the present tense and sometimes in the past tense, and uses excerpts from newspaper articles and letters (partly based on original sources, partly invented), screenplay-like dialogue passages, as well as occasional direct address to the reader. However, the personal narrative situation dominates; some perspectives – primarily those of Danton, Desmoulins, and Robespierre – are clearly privileged, whereby the narrative by no means claims neutrality. However, no central, generalizing moral standpoint emerges. The juxtaposition of different historical sources, original quotations and invented dialogues, literary and historical discourse results in a polyphony with the effect that the resulting transpersonal narrative instance appears just as constructed as the fictional characters, and is not portrayed as superior to them in terms of either factual knowledge or morality.

== Position in literary history ==
Mantel's literary treatment of the French Revolution differs greatly from portrayals by Charles Dickens and Thomas Carlyle. While Dickens in "A Tale of Two Cities," inspired by Carlyle's "The French Revolution: A History," primarily highlights the people's thirst for revenge as the main motive for the revolution and views the events rather from the outside, Mantel mainly focuses on the internal power struggles of the revolutionaries.

For example, Dickens describes the September Massacres in gruesome detail and gives the carnage a mythological dimension. Mantel, on the other hand, concentrates on the bureaucratic aspects of terror, describing not, like Dickens and Carlyle, the sharpening of knives and the streams of blood, but the creation of lists with names of those to be killed or saved, thus reflecting a conception of mass murder more in line with the 20th century. She does not focus on the execution of the murders, but on their planning, and emphasizes the arbitrary nature of the processes – Desmoulins saves a priest and lawyer he knows from his youth days for sentimental reasons; others save their lives for a fee; when the killing begins, the situation quickly gets out of control; the lists become meaningless and randomly present people are killed indiscriminately.

Dickens ignores the role of politics and leaders in history and does not address the various stages of the revolution, merely highlighting the storming of the Bastille and subsequently the Reign of Terror from the events – he prioritizes the role of the people and supports the idea of revolution as revenge. In contrast, Mantel focuses on the activities of politicians, covers the entire history of the revolution both in Paris and in the provinces, and problematizes the question of individual agency.

Mantel takes the most artistic freedom in explaining Robespierre's break with Danton and Desmoulins. Here she follows in Carlyle's footsteps, who, like Georg Büchner in his drama "Danton's Death," sees the political rivalry between Robespierre and Danton not only rooted in ideological differences but also strongly in personal aversion. However, Mantel goes a step further and invents an erotically charged triangular relationship between Danton and the former schoolmates Robespierre and Desmoulins, as well as a sexual transgression by Danton against an acquaintance of Robespierre, which finally provides him with the moral pretext for his now also politically opportune turning away from his former friends.

== Background ==
Mantel began writing the novel in 1975 and completed it in 1979, but was unable to find a publisher. “I wrote a letter to an agent saying would you look at my book, it’s about the French Revolution, it’s not a historical romance, and the letter came back saying, we do not take historical romances [...] because of the expectations surrounding the words ‘French Revolution’ ― that it was bound to be about ladies with high hair." The novel remained unpublished until 1992. Mantel explains that, where possible, she used the historical figures' own words, from their speeches or writings.

== Radio play ==
In 2018, WDR (West German Broadcasting) produced a 26-part radio play version of the novel, based on the translation by Sabine Roth and Kathrin Razum. The music was composed by Pierre Oser. The radio adaptation was created by Walter Adler, who also directed. The total playing time is approximately 13 hours. The ensemble of speakers comprised about 150 people. The main roles were played by Robert Dölle as Danton, Matthias Bundschuh as Desmoulins, and Jens Harzer as Robespierre. The radio play "Brüder" was first broadcast from September 3 to October 12, 2018, on WDR 3. A CD edition was published by Audio Verlag in 2018.

== Reception ==
A Place of Greater Safety won the Sunday Express Book of the Year award.

In The Guardian, historian Kate Williams named the book her favorite of Mantel's novels.

An article in The Independent described it as a "book of a lifetime".

The New York Times praised Mantel, but not the book, wondering if "more novel and less history might not better suit this author's unmistakable talent."

This criticism is also found in the German reception – for example, Duygu Ökzan in "Die Presse" complains that it is sometimes very difficult for the reader to distinguish between fact and fiction; the novel is very carefully researched – but too little for a scholarly book and too much for a novel. However, the reviewer does not share other critics' frequent complaints that Mantel focuses too much on the personal dramas of the politicians and neglects the role of the actual people – Mantel does not give her the feeling of looking down on the revolution from above, and she sees the accusation that the author has written a soap opera refuted by the lack of a happy ending.

In his critique of the radio play in the "FAZ," Oliver Jungen finds the attention devoted to the love lives of the heroes excessive, but likewise does not see Mantel's achievement diminished by this. Mantel shows the French path into the abyss as a "crazy stumbling, a proto-fascist ride." The atrocities of the Reign of Terror prove to be the work of humans, not devils.
