= Beyond Black =

2005 novel by Hilary Mantel

- First edition (UK)
- Author: Hilary Mantel
- Language: English
- Genre: Gothic novel
- Publisher: Fourth Estate (UK); Henry Holt and Co. (US)
- Publication date: 2005
- Publication place: United Kingdom
- Media type: Print (Paperback)
- Pages: 384 pp
- ISBN: 0-00-715775-4
- OCLC: 57382720

Beyond Black is a 2005 novel by English writer Hilary Mantel. It was shortlisted for the 2006 Orange Prize for Fiction.

== Plot summary ==
The book's central character is a medium named Alison Hart who, along with her assistant, Colette, takes her one-woman psychic show on the road, travelling to venues around the Home Counties, and providing her audience with a point of contact between this world and the next. On the surface, Alison seems like a happy-go-lucky woman, but this persona is only a mask she wears for her public. In truth, she is deeply traumatised by memories and ghosts from her childhood, and a knowledge that the afterlife is not the wonderful place her clients often perceive it to be. She spends much of the story trying to exorcise her demons, and by the end is ultimately able to overcome them.
