= An Experiment in Love =

1995 novel by Hilary Mantel

- First edition
- Author: Hilary Mantel
- Language: English
- Publisher: Viking Books
- Publication date: January 1, 1995
- Awards: Hawthornden Prize (1996)

An Experiment in Love is a 1995 novel by Hilary Mantel first published by Viking Books.

== Summary ==
A chance discovery of a news article on a former schoolmate, Julia Lipcott, triggers a flood of memories for Carmel McBain, who reflects back on her experiences at school and university, and her relationships with Julia and another contemporary, Karina. The novel oscillates between Carmel's time at a convent school in Lancashire where she first met Karina, the daughter of Eastern European immigrants, and later Julianne (Julia), the daughter of a doctor; and the 1970s when the three all attended the University of London together.

After an absence from school as a child, Carmel meets Karina. The two both live in the same row of houses and walk to school every day together, but never become close. Carmel attributes this to the fact that, as an infant, she kicked a doll of Karina's. Class differences also separate the two girls: despite the fact that they both come from working-class families, Karina's parents are even poorer than Carmel's.

At the age of ten, Carmel's mother pushes her to take the a scholarship exam for the Holy Redeemer, a prestigious Catholic secondary school, and persuades Karina's mother Mary to let Karina apply as well. Both girls are successful and it is here they meet Julianne (as she is then known) for the first time.

All three are successful in applying to the University of London. Carmel shares a room in a hall of residence with Julianne, who later changes her name to Julia; while Karina stays with Lynette, a wealthy only child. Karina and Carmel grow further apart. Carmel's university existence is marked by extreme poverty and hunger, while Karina somehow manages to subsist on even fewer resources.

== Reception ==
Author Margaret Atwood championed the book in a review in The New York Times when it was first published in the U.S., stating that the "pleasures of the novel [...] are many". Author Zadie Smith included the novel as part of a course syllabus which leaked online in 2013.

The book was discussed on BBC Radio 4's A Good Read in October 2021.

== Awards ==
An Experiment in Love won the 1996 Hawthornden Prize.
