= Ensay =

Ensay may refer to:

- Ensay, Mull, a place on the Isle of Mull, Argyll and Bute, Scotland
- Ensay, Outer Hebrides, a privately owned island in the Outer Hebrides
- Ensay, Victoria, a town in Victoria, Australia
