= Tooth transplant =

Operation to move or add teeth

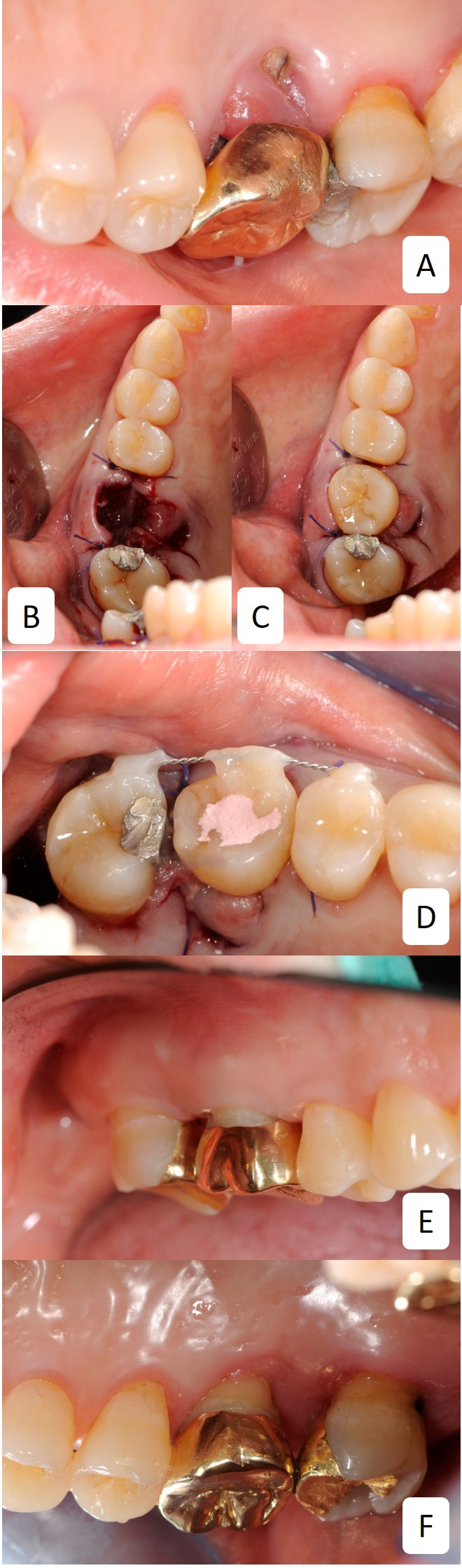
- A) Unrestorable upper right first permanent molar (FDI: 16). B) Extraction socket of unrestorable upper right first permanent molar. C) Extracted upper right wisdom tooth (FDI:18) immediately transplanted into socket of upper right first permanent molar. D) Transplanted wisdom tooth splinted into position. E & F) Gold shell crown fitted onto transplanted tooth to restore contact with adjacent tooth and anatomy. Note: Faulty restoration of upper right second permanent molar replaced with gold inlay. Both photos taken 7 years after initial surgery.
- Specialty: Dental

Tooth transplantation is mainly divided into two types:

- Allotransplantation (homogenous), where a tooth is transferred from one individual to a different individual of the same species. Nowadays, it is largely abandoned as the practice carries many risks including transmission of infection, such as syphilis, and histocompatibility issues. Long-term success of allotransplantation of teeth was also extremely rare, usually lasting about six years.
- Autotransplantation (autogenous), where a tooth is transferred from one site to another in the same individual.

== Indications and Contraindications ==
=== Indications ===
Autotransplantation of teeth can be considered in the following circumstances:

- Movement of impacted or severely ectopic teeth to their correct position if conventional surgical exposure and orthodontics is not appropriate.
- Management of congenitally absent teeth in one arch with crowding present in the other arch.
- Premature loss of permanent dentition from caries, trauma, iatrogenic damage or developmental abnormalities. The tooth of choice to replace a tooth missing in the anterior maxillary region is the maxillary second premolars. Poor prognosis first permanent molars can be replaced with third molars

Autotransplantation has the best outcome in growing patients with some root development complete but incomplete development at the apex. If fully developed, autotransplantation can still be successful if an RCT is performed prior to autotransplantation or within 4 weeks following. It has been suggested that tooth autotransplantation may be a successful alternative to osseointergrated dental implants in growing patients, as osseointergrated dental implants are contra indicated in growing patients as they do not grow down with the developing dentition and become fused to the bone.

=== Contraindications ===
Contraindications include the autotransplantation of deciduous teeth, transplant to an infected site, if the donor tooth is already restored and if the patient has poor oral hygiene and compliance

== Risks and complications ==
Reported complications of tooth autotransplantation include:

- failure requiring extraction
- hyper-mobility
- ankylosis
- pulp necrosis
- pulp obliteration
- root resorption

Factors that could influence the risk of complications can range from the age and gender of the candidate to stage of root development, donor and recipient site and extraoral timing of transplantation.

The stage of root development seems to be the biggest influencer of both the future survival, as well as the success of the transplanted teeth. Teeth with open apex are less likely to be extracted in the future compared to teeth with closed apex.

The recipient site should be free from acute infection and chronic inflammation. Adequacy of bone support is crucial criteria for success. To ensure stabilisation of the transplanted tooth and to avoid infection there must be sufficient bone support in all dimensions with adequate attached keratinised tissue.

Timing also plays an important role as immediate replantation of extracted teeth is known to have a good prognosis. Ideally, extraction of the tooth from recipient site should be performed on the same day when donor tooth is removed for transplantation. In cases when tooth from recipient site must be extracted earlier due to toothache or other reasons, transplantation should be scheduled within a month. The later donor tooth will be transplanted, the less support it will have as resorption of the bone would occur at the recipient site.

Furthermore, risk of complications is also increased in cases where candidate selection criteria are not met, where ideally candidates must be in a good health, demonstrate excellent level of oral hygiene, and be amenable to regular dental care.

== Procedure ==
The procedure of tooth transplant is technique sensitive and it requires a team approach involving orthodontist, oral surgeon, paediatric dentist, dental radiologist and technical support. Imaging is needed for radiographic planning of tooth transplant. Two-dimensional imaging is usually sufficient but three-dimensional imaging can be a useful adjunct to treatment planning. Data from Cone Beam Computed Tomography (CBCT) helps to create an accurate surgical template, thereby enhancing the success of autotransplantation of teeth. The procedure of tooth transplant generally involves three stages:

=== Pre-surgical orthodontics ===
The aim of pre-surgical orthodontics is to plan the treatment of the malocclusion and to prepare adequate space in the recipient site before the surgical procedure. This may involve having fixed or removable appliances for a few months before the transplant is done. Occasionally the tooth to be transplanted will need to be removed before there is enough space available at the donor site. These teeth can be kept in liquid nitrogen until pre-surgical orthodontic treatment is completed.

=== Tooth transplant surgery ===
The classical tooth transplant technique involves the extraction of the donor tooth and preparation of the recipient site using the donor tooth as a template. The use of surgical template has been proposed to minimise extra-alveolar time for the donor tooth. The recipient site is accurately contoured to ensure good blood supply to promote revascularization after tooth transplant. Donor tooth is carefully extracted then placed into the prepared socket and sutured in place. The literature suggests splinting teeth post-operatively but there is limited evidence to support type of splinting material and duration for transplanted teeth.

=== Post-surgical treatment ===
Post-surgical treatment involves post-surgical orthodontics and restorations. Post-surgical orthodontics is required to straighten the teeth and achieve the final positioning of the transplanted tooth before definitive restoration. It also provides an additional advantage in the first few months to keep the transplanted tooth free from occlusal trauma. In some cases, endodontic treatment is indicated, but the timing of endodontic treatment is debated in the literature. Restorative work is carried out to improve the appearance of the transplanted tooth. Composite is used either as a temporary or definitive restoration. Partial porcelain veneer can be used as a definitive restoration to match the shape and shade of the natural tooth.

== History ==
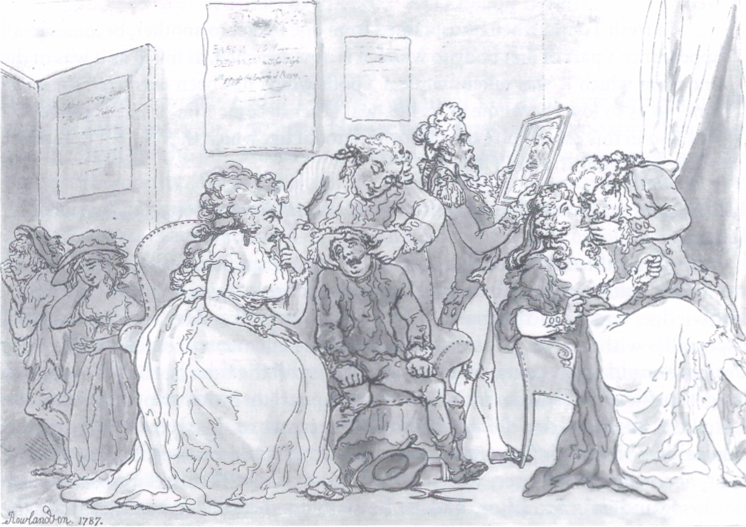
A 1787 caricature by Thomas Rowlandson depicting the "Transplantation of Teeth". In the center stands a fashionably dressed dentist removing a tooth from a poor chimney-sweep. The aristocratic lady seated to the left of the viewer is watching and waiting to receive the tooth. However, the caricature was aimed at highlighting the abuse of the poor, not the transplant procedure.

Tooth transplantation has been reported from as early as ancient Egypt where mummies were found with human teeth transplanted from other individuals. It was said that slaves were forced to give up teeth to their pharaohs. One of the earliest written accounts of tooth transplantation was by Ambroise Paré, which he wrote around 1562 and was translated by Thomas Johnson in 1634, pp. 658:

Charles Allen, in 1685, wrote of tooth transplantation in the first English dental textbook, The Operator for the Teeth. He encouraged tooth transplantation from animals over humans, stating the latter to be "inhumane" and "attended with too many difficulties". Pierre Fauchard shared his experience in tooth transplantation in the acclaimed Le Chirurgien Dentiste ("The Surgeon Dentist"), published in 1728. In it, he detailed transplanting a canine from a soldier to a captain in an army. The donor tooth was too wide and long for the Captain and Fauchard resorted to reducing its size to fit into the receiver's socket. This resulted in a cavity on the tooth which Fauchard filled once the tooth stabilized. The filling was removed the next day however, as it caused extreme pain. Fauchard saw the patient eight years later who had lost the donor tooth by then but the Captain insisted that the tooth had lasted him six years before being extracted due to caries.

Philipp Pfaff, credited as Germany's first "state-appointed dentist", published Abhandlung von den Zähnen des menschlichen Körpers und deren Krankheiten, (Treatise on The Teeth of the Human Body and Their Diseases) in 1756. He was not fond of tooth transplantation from corpses but emphasized the importance of preserving periodontal ligaments of the transplanted tooth and sealing the apical foramen with lead or wax.

John Hunter documented successful transplantation between humans in 1772, at the peak of the procedure's popularity, stating that it is "without great difficulty, Nature assisting the operation, if it is done in such a way she can assist". Hunter appreciated that the tooth transplanted should ideally be smaller than the socket, and if not, should be adjusted to fit the socket. Hunter is guilty however, of not acknowledging the significance of tooth transplantation in spreading syphilis to seven of his patients following the procedure. Benjamin Bell wrote in 1785 on tooth transplanting in his book, A system of surgery (volume 5), pp. 76, on how the transplanted tooth must be "free from scurvy and the lues venera" thereby appreciating the significance of the procedure in the transmission of various infections.

Following Nicholas Dubois de Chemant's development of "mineral paste dentures", which he patented in 1788, allotransplantation was gradually replaced by dentures that at that time were claimed to not decay in the mouth.

Towards 1950, autotransplantation began to appear in dental literature, renewing interest in tooth transplantation. However, the success rate of the procedure was only about 50%.
