= Hilary Mantel =

British writer (1952–2022)

Dame Hilary Mantel DBE FRSL
- Born: Hilary Mary Thompson; 6 July 1952; Glossop, Derbyshire, England
- Died: 22 September 2022 (aged 70); Exeter, Devon, England
- Education: London School of Economics; University of Sheffield (LLB)
- Occupations: Novelist; short story writer; essayist; critic
- Spouses: Gerald McEwen (m. 1973; div. 1981); (m. 1982)
- Writing career
- Language: English
- Period: 1985–2022
- Notable works: Wolf Hall; Bring Up the Bodies; Fludd; Beyond Black
- Notable awards: Booker Prize 2009, 2012; Walter Scott Prize 2010, 2021; Costa Novel Prize 2012
- Hilary Mantel's voice from the BBC programme Bookclub, 6 October 2013
- Website: hilary-mantel.com

Photos
- Hilary Mantel, 17 October 2012
- Hilary Mantel, 8 March 2020

Dame Hilary Mary Mantel DBE FRSL (/mænˈtɛl/ man-TEL; born Thompson; 6 July 1952 – 22 September 2022) was a British writer whose work includes historical fiction, personal memoirs and short stories. Her first published novel, Every Day Is Mother's Day, was released in 1985. She went on to write 12 novels, two collections of short stories, a memoir, and numerous articles and opinion pieces.

Mantel won the Booker Prize twice: the first was for her 2009 novel Wolf Hall, a fictional account of Thomas Cromwell's rise to power in the court of Henry VIII, and the second was for its 2012 sequel Bring Up the Bodies. The third installment of the Cromwell trilogy, The Mirror & the Light, was longlisted for the same prize. The trilogy has gone on to sell more than 5 million copies.

== Early life ==
Hilary Mary Thompson was born on 6 July 1952 in Glossop, Derbyshire, the eldest of three children, with two younger brothers, and raised as a Roman Catholic in the mill village of Hadfield, where she attended St. Charles Roman Catholic Primary School.

Her parents, Margaret (née Foster) and Henry Thompson (a clerk), were both Catholics of Irish descent, born in England. When Mantel was seven, her mother's lover, Jack Mantel, moved in with the family. He shared a bedroom with her mother, while her father moved to another room. Four years later, when she was eleven, the family, except for her father, moved to Romiley, Cheshire, to escape the local gossip. She never saw her father again.

When the family relocated, Jack Mantel (1932–1995) became her unofficial stepfather, and she legally took his surname. She attended Harrytown Convent school in Romiley, Cheshire.

In 1970, she began studies at the London School of Economics to read law. She transferred to the University of Sheffield and graduated as a Bachelor of Jurisprudence in 1973. After university, Mantel worked in the social work department of a geriatric hospital and then as a sales assistant at Kendals department store in Manchester.

In 1973, she married Gerald McEwen, a geologist. In 1974, she began writing a novel about the French Revolution, but was unable to find a publisher (it was eventually released as A Place of Greater Safety in 1992). In 1977 Mantel moved with her husband to Botswana, where they lived for the next five years. Later, they spent four years in Jeddah, Saudi Arabia. She later said that leaving Jeddah felt like "the happiest day of [her] life". She published memoirs of this period in The Spectator, and the London Review of Books.

== Literary career ==
Mantel's first novel, Every Day Is Mother's Day, was published in 1985, and its sequel, Vacant Possession, a year later. After returning to England, she became the film critic of The Spectator, a position she held from 1987 to 1991, and a reviewer for a number of papers and magazines in Britain and the United States.

Her third novel, Eight Months on Ghazzah Street (1988), drew on her life in Saudi Arabia. It features a threatening clash of values between the neighbours in a city apartment block to explore the tensions between Islamic culture and the liberal West. Her Winifred Holtby Memorial Prize-winning novel Fludd (1989) is set in 1956 in a fictitious northern village called Fetherhoughton, centring on a Roman Catholic church and a convent. A mysterious stranger brings about transformations in the lives of those around him.

Mantel was a Booker Prize judge in 1990, when A. S. Byatt's novel Possession was awarded the prize.

A Place of Greater Safety (1992) became The Sunday Express Book of the Year, an award for which her two previous books had been shortlisted. This large-scale historical novel, informed by scholarly knowledge, traces the career of three French revolutionaries, Danton, Robespierre and Camille Desmoulins, from childhood to their early deaths during the Reign of Terror of 1794.

A Change of Climate (1994), partly set in rural Norfolk, explores the lives of Ralph and Anna Eldred, as they raise their four children and devote their lives to charity. It includes chapters about their early married life as missionaries in South Africa, when they were imprisoned and deported to Bechuanaland, and the tragedy that occurred there.

An Experiment in Love (1996), which won the Hawthornden Prize, takes place over two university terms in 1970. It follows the progress of three girls – two friends and one enemy – as they leave home and attend university in London. Margaret Thatcher makes a cameo appearance in this novel, which explores women's appetites and ambitions, and suggests how they are often thwarted. Though Mantel used material from her own life, it is not an autobiographical novel.

Her next book, The Giant, O'Brien (1998), is set in the 1780s, and is based on the true story of Charles Byrne (or O'Brien). He came to London to earn money by displaying himself as a freak. His bones hang today in the Museum of the Royal College of Surgeons. The novel treats O'Brien and his antagonist, the Scots surgeon John Hunter, less as characters in history than as mythic protagonists in a dark and violent fairytale, necessary casualties of the Age of Enlightenment. She adapted the book for BBC Radio 4, in a play starring Alex Norton (as Hunter) and Frances Tomelty.

In 2003, Mantel published her memoir, Giving Up the Ghost, which won the MIND "Book of the Year" award. That same year she brought out a collection of short stories, Learning To Talk. All the stories deal with childhood and, taken together, the books show how the events of a life are mediated as fiction. Her 2005 novel, Beyond Black, was shortlisted for the Orange Prize and longlisted for the Booker Prize in 2005. Novelist Pat Barker said it was "the book that should actually have won the Booker". Set in the late 1990s and early 2000s, it features a professional medium, Alison Hart, whose calm and jolly exterior conceals grotesque psychic damage. She trails around with her a troupe of "fiends", who are invisible but always on the verge of becoming flesh.

The long novel Wolf Hall, about Henry VIII's minister Thomas Cromwell, was published in 2009 to critical acclaim. The book won that year's Booker Prize and, upon winning the award, Mantel said, "I can tell you at this moment I am happily flying through the air". Judges voted three to two in favour of Wolf Hall for the prize. Mantel was presented with a trophy and a £50,000 cash prize during an evening ceremony at the Guildhall, London. The panel of judges, led by the broadcaster James Naughtie, described Wolf Hall as an "extraordinary piece of storytelling". Leading up to the award, the book was backed as the favourite by bookmakers and accounted for 45% of the sales of all the nominated books. It was the first favourite since 2002 to win the award. On receiving the prize, Mantel said that she would spend the prize money on "sex and drugs and rock' n' roll".

The Culture Show programme on BBC Two broadcast a profile of Mantel on 17 September 2011.

The sequel to Wolf Hall, called Bring Up the Bodies, was published in May 2012 to wide acclaim. It won the Costa Book of the Year and the 2012 Man Booker Prize; Mantel thus became the first British writer and the first woman to win the Booker Prize more than once. Mantel was the fourth author to receive the award twice, following J. M. Coetzee, Peter Carey and J. G. Farrell. This award also made Mantel the first author to win the award for a sequel. The books were adapted into plays by the Royal Shakespeare Company and were produced as a mini-series by BBC.

In 2014, Mantel published a collection of 10 short stories, The Assassination of Margaret Thatcher, which The Guardian called a "flawed but absorbing selection" singling out the story Sorry to Disturb for praise. The New York Times described the collection as having "narrators much more outwardly meek and inwardly turbulent than the murderous royals and puppeteers so beloved in her historical fiction". The controversial title story is about an assassin who disguises himself as a plumber and takes over an apartment opposite the hospital where the Prime Minister is undergoing eye surgery. The woman who owns the apartment, and who is in effect a hostage, turns out to be surprisingly sympathetic to the assassin's cause.

In December 2016, Mantel spoke with The Kenyon Review editor David H. Lynn on the KR Podcast about the way historical novels are published, what it is like to live in the world of one character for more than ten years, writing for the stage, and the final book in her Thomas Cromwell trilogy, The Mirror & the Light.

She delivered five 2017 Reith Lectures on BBC Radio Four, talking about the theme of historical fiction. Her final one of these lectures was on the theme of adaptation of historical novels for stage or screen. Mantel's lectures were selected by its producer, Jim Frank, as amongst the best of the long-running series.

In 2020, Mantel published the third novel of the Thomas Cromwell trilogy, called The Mirror & the Light. It was selected for the longlist for the 2020 Booker Prize.

Mantel also wrote reviews and essays, mainly for The Guardian, the London Review of Books and The New York Review of Books.

Mantel worked on a short non-fiction book titled The Woman Who Died of Robespierre, about the Polish playwright Stanisława Przybyszewska, which was edited and published posthumously. (One of her Reith Lectures, "Silence Grips the Town," was about Przybyszewska.) At the time of her death in 2022, Mantel was working on a new novel which was characterized as a "mash-up" of Jane Austen novels.

== Personal life and death ==
Mantel married Gerald McEwen in 1973. They divorced in 1981 but remarried in 1982. McEwen gave up geology to manage his wife's business. They lived in Budleigh Salterton, Devon.

During her twenties, Mantel had a debilitating and painful illness. She was initially diagnosed with a psychiatric illness, hospitalised, and treated with antipsychotic drugs, which reportedly produced psychotic symptoms. As a consequence, Mantel refrained from seeking help from doctors for some years. Finally, in Botswana and desperate, she consulted a medical textbook and realised she was probably suffering from a severe form of endometriosis, a diagnosis confirmed by doctors in London. The condition, and what was considered at the time to be a necessary treatment – a surgical menopause at the age of 27 – left her unable to have children. She later said, "you've thought your way through questions of fertility and menopause and what it means to be without children because it all happened catastrophically." Endometriosis led Mantel to see the problematised woman's body as a theme in her writing. Continuing pain made most work impossible and led to her becoming a full-time writer; she said that it "narrowed my options in life ... to writing."

Mantel said of pain that "you have to find a way of living with it and living around it." She used autogenic training as one tool in living with her conditions. She became patron of the Endometriosis SHE Trust.

Mantel died on 22 September 2022, aged 70, at a hospital in Exeter from complications of a stroke three days earlier.

== Views ==
During her university years (1970–73), Mantel identified as a socialist, and was a member of the Young Communist League.

=== Comments on royalty ===
In a 2013 speech on media and royal women at the British Museum, Mantel commented on Catherine Middleton, then the Duchess of Cambridge, saying that Middleton was forced to present herself publicly as a personality-free "shop window mannequin" whose sole purpose is to deliver an heir to the throne. Mantel expanded on these views in an essay, "Royal Bodies", for the London Review of Books (LRB): "It may be that the whole phenomenon of monarchy is irrational, but that doesn't mean that when we look at it we should behave like spectators at Bedlam. Cheerful curiosity can easily become cruelty".

These remarks stimulated substantial public debate. The Leader of the Opposition Ed Miliband and Prime Minister David Cameron both criticised Mantel's remarks, while Jemima Khan defended Mantel. Zing Tsjeng praised the LRB essay, finding the "clarity of prose and analysis is just incredible".

=== Margaret Thatcher ===
In September 2014, in an interview published in The Guardian, Mantel said she had fantasised about the murder of the British prime minister Margaret Thatcher in 1983, and fictionalised the event in a short story called "The Assassination of Margaret Thatcher: 6 August 1983". Allies of Thatcher called for a police investigation, to which Mantel responded: "Bringing in the police for an investigation was beyond anything I could have planned or hoped for, because it immediately exposes them to ridicule."

In 2026, a stage adaptation of this story premiered at the Liverpool Everyman Theatre; it was adapted by playwright Alexandra Wood and directed by John Young. Reviewer Mark Fisher said that the adaptation kept Mantel's humor and increased the drama.

=== Comments on Catholicism ===
Mantel discussed her religious views in her 2003 memoir, Giving Up the Ghost. Brought up as a Roman Catholic, she ceased to believe at age 12, but said the religion left a permanent mark on her:

I took what I was told really seriously, it bred a very intense habit of introspection and self-examination and a terrible severity with myself. So that nothing was ever good enough. It's like installing a policeman, and one moreover who keeps changing the law.

In a 2013 interview with The Daily Telegraph, Mantel stated: "I think that nowadays the Catholic Church is not an institution for respectable people. [...] When I was a child I wondered why priests and nuns were not nicer people. I thought that they were amongst the worst people I knew." These statements, as well as the themes explored in her earlier novel Fludd, led the Catholic bishop Mark O'Toole to comment: "There is an anti-Catholic thread there, there is no doubt about it. Wolf Hall is not neutral."

== Awards and honours ==
=== Literary prizes ===
- 1987 The Spectator's Shiva Naipaul Prize for travel writing for Last Morning in Al Hamra
- 1990 Southern Arts Literature Prize for Fludd
- 1990 Cheltenham Prize for Fludd
- 1990 Winifred Holtby Memorial Prize for Fludd
- 1992 Sunday Express Book of the Year for A Place of Greater Safety
- 1996 Hawthornden Prize for An Experiment in Love
- 2003 MIND Book of the Year for Giving Up the Ghost (A Memoir)
- 2009 Booker Prize for Wolf Hall
- 2009 National Book Critics Circle Award for Wolf Hall
- 2010 Walter Scott Prize for Wolf Hall
- 2010 UK Author of the Year, Waterstones Book Awards, for Wolf Hall
- 2012 Booker Prize for Bring Up the Bodies
- 2012 UK Author of the Year, British Book Awards, for Bring Up the Bodies
- 2012 Novel prize and Book of the Year, Costa Book Awards, for Bring Up the Bodies
- 2013 David Cohen Prize
- 2013 Literature prize, South Bank Show Awards, for Bring up the Bodies
- 2016 British Academy President's Medal
- 2016 Kenyon Review Award for Literary Achievement
- 2020 Royal Society of Literature Companion of Literature

=== Honours ===
- Commander of the Order of the British Empire (CBE) in the 2006 Birthday Honours
- 2009 Honorary DLitt from Sheffield Hallam University
- 2011 Honorary DLitt from the University of Exeter
- 2011 Honorary DLitt from Kingston University
- 2013 Honorary DLitt from the University of Cambridge
- 2013 Honorary DLitt from the University of Derby
- 2013 Honorary DLitt from Bath Spa University
- Dame Commander of the Order of the British Empire (DBE) in the 2014 Birthday Honours, for services to literature
- 2015 Honorary LLD from the London School of Economics
- 2015 Honorary DLitt from the University of Oxford
- 2015 Honorary degree from Oxford Brookes University

== List of works ==
=== Novels ===
- —— (1985). Every Day Is Mother's Day. Chatto & Windus. ISBN 070112895X.
- —— (1986). Vacant Possession. Chatto & Windus. ISBN 0701130474.
- —— (1988). Eight Months on Ghazzah Street. Viking Press. ISBN 9780805052039.
- —— (1989). Fludd. Viking Press. ISBN 9780670821181.
- —— (1992). A Place of Greater Safety. Viking Press. ISBN 9780312426392.
- —— (1994). A Change of Climate. Viking Press. ISBN 9780670830510.
- —— (1995). An Experiment in Love. Viking Press. ISBN 9780670859221.
- —— (1998). The Giant, O'Brien (hardcover ed.). Fourth Estate. ISBN 9781857028843.
- —— (2005). Beyond Black (hardcover ed.). Fourth Estate. ISBN 9780007157754.

==== Thomas Cromwell series ====
- —— (2009). Wolf Hall. Fourth Estate. ISBN 9780805080681.
- —— (2012). Bring Up the Bodies. Fourth Estate. ISBN 9780805090031.
- —— (2020). The Mirror & the Light. Fourth Estate. ISBN 9780007480999.

=== Short story collections ===
- —— (2003). Learning to Talk. Fourth Estate. ISBN 9780007166442.
- —— (2014). The Assassination of Margaret Thatcher. Fourth Estate. ISBN 9780007580989.

=== Memoir ===
- —— (2003). Giving Up the Ghost. Fourth Estate. ISBN 9780007148417.

=== Other non-fiction ===
- —— (2024). Pearson, Nicholas (ed.). The Woman Who Died of Robespierre. Fourth Estate. ISBN 9780007145034.

=== Selected articles and essays ===
- "A Realist With Wings", Literary Review, September 1996
- "Pain in the Desert", Literary Review, September 1989
- "What a man this is, with his crowd of women around him!", London Review of Books, 30 March 2000.
- "Some Girls Want Out", London Review of Books, v. 26 no. 5, pg 14–18, 4 March 2004.
- "Diary", London Review of Books, 4 November 2010.
- "Kinsella in His Hole - A Story", London Review of Books, 19 May 2016.
- "Royal Bodies", London Review of Books, 21 February 2013.
- "Blot, erase, delete: How the author found her voice and why all writers should resist the urge to change their past words", Index Censorship, September 2016.
- —— (2020). Mantel Pieces
- —— (2023). A Memoir of My Former Self: A Life in Writing
