= Fludd (novel) =

1989 novel by Hilary Mantel

- First edition
- Author: Hilary Mantel
- Cover artist: Russell Ayto
- Language: English
- Publisher: Viking Press
- Publication date: 1989
- Publication place: United Kingdom
- Media type: Print & eBook
- Pages: 192
- ISBN: 0-670-82118-7

Fludd is a novel by Hilary Mantel. First published by Viking Press in 1989, it won the Winifred Holtby Memorial Prize that year.

The novel is set in 1956, in Fetherhoughton, a dreary and isolated fictional town somewhere on the moors of northern England. The people of the town seem benighted, but are portrayed by Mantel with sympathy and affection. The plot centres on the Roman Catholic church and convent in the town and concerns the dramatic impact of the mysterious Fludd, who is apparently a curate sent by the bishop to assist Father Angwin, a priest who continues in his role despite privately having lost his faith.

The novel presents an uncompromisingly harsh view of the Roman Catholic Church, portraying a vividly cruel mother superior and a thoughtless, bullying bishop. The narrative flirts with the supernatural (for instance, a wart migrates miraculously from one person to another, a character bursts into flames, Fludd causes food to vanish without appearing to eat it). Fludd resembles the Devil in various ways (he instantly succeeds in learning people's innermost feelings and wishes, and he performs subtle profane miracles like maintaining an ever-full whiskey bottle). Yet Fludd's effect on both of the two main protagonists, Father Angwin and the young Sister Philomena, turns out to be very liberating, and the novel ends with some degree of new hope for both of them.
