= The Giant, O'Brien =

1998 novel by Hilary Mantel

- First edition (UK)
- Author: Hilary Mantel
- Language: English
- Publisher: Fourth Estate (UK); Henry Holt (US)
- Publication date: 1998
- Publication place: United Kingdom
- Media type: Print
- Pages: 219
- ISBN: 1-85702-884-8

The Giant, O'Brien is a novel by Hilary Mantel, published in 1998. It is a fictionalised account of Irish giant Charles Byrne (O'Brien) and Scottish surgeon John Hunter.

== Plot introduction ==
Set mainly in the 1780s it tells of O'Brien and his companions as they decide to escape the poverty of Ireland to seek their fortune in London. O'Brien is portrayed as a teller of folk tales and as a poet who aims to save enough money to rebuild the ruined Mulroney's Tavern where as a youth he learned to be a storyteller. In contrast, John Hunter is obsessed with science; with an insatiable desire to experiment on both the living and the dead, both man and animals; employing body-snatchers to supply his needs. When he hears of O'Brien's arrival in London, Hunter determines to obtain his body. Ominously O'Brien is still growing and it appears Hunter may not have too long to wait.

== Inspiration ==
In the postscript to the 2010 paperback edition of the novel Mantel writes 'In a way I feel, more than with any other book, that I have absolutely no responsibility for what I put on the page'. She explains that she had initially planned to write 'a big, realistic historical novel about John Hunter, the great surgeon, collector and experimentalist', but as she began to write she had a sudden revelation that she herself was Irish, 'Somehow the giant's story became part of this awakening and the feeling grew in me that in order to find myself I had to go back and capture that voice, that Irishness. So the novel became about the giant utterly, and the giant's people, and the giant's transition from speaking Irish to speaking English, exploring what is lost, and what is gained in the process. It was as if something came into the room, opened its mouth and sang. I just wrote the song out and it was over'.

== Reception ==
- Walter Kendrick in The New York Times Book Review writes "The Giant, O'Brien isn't billed as a horror story. With its careful period setting, its spare, elegant prose and its stretches of wistful fantasy as the giant spins his tales, the novel plainly has higher aspirations. But the ludicrous, horrific Hunter overshadows the rest of the characters."
- Carey Harrison in the San Francisco Chronicle is lavish in her praise: "No reader who loves fiction should miss this opportunity to read this extraordinary work. Mantel's language blends true strangeness with delicious immediacy, and with every new book she is redefining the range, the power and the urgency of the historical novel."
- John Bayley in The New York Review of Books writes "Hilary Mantel has felt herself into the poetics of history with singular intensity. Although her novel is in one sense a brilliant pastiche, drawing on Swift and on Joyce, deploying all the tricks of understatement and of what the great Russian formalist Shklovsky called "making it strange," it triumphantly justifies and reanimates these well-worn methods. It becomes her own style, as acute and arresting as is her vision of history."
- Publishers Weekly praises the contrast Mantel presents "between the steel-willed, splenetic Hunter and the gentle giant, a hedgerow scholar whose generous nature and naivete are his undoing" and goes on to say "her picture of late-18th-century London is brilliant--especially the gloom, filth and squalor in which the lower class exists, ruled by prejudice, superstition and strong drink." but it concludes "While the narrative fascinates with atmospheric detail, however, this novel lacks the artfully maintained suspense of Mantel's previous work"
