= Every Day Is Mother's Day =

1985 debut novel by Hilary Mantel

Every Day is Mother's Day
- First edition (UK)
- Author: Hilary Mantel
- Language: English
- Publisher: Chatto and Windus
- Publication date: 1985
- Publication place: United Kingdom
- Media type: Print
- Pages: 230
- ISBN: 0-7011-2895-X
- OCLC: 11631321
- Followed by: Vacant Possession

Every Day is Mother's Day is the first novel by British author Hilary Mantel, published in 1985 by Chatto and Windus. It was inspired in part by Hilary Mantel's own experiences as a social work assistant at a geriatric hospital which involved visits to patients in the community and access to case notes, the loss of which play an important part in the novel.

== Plot introduction ==
It is a black comedy set in the mid-1970s and begins with the widowed spiritualist Evelyn Axon's discovery that her mentally-handicapped daughter Muriel is pregnant. Isabel Field is the latest social worker to tackle the Axons but Evelyn is determined not to let anyone interfere with Muriel, whose condition she blames on her daughter's recent weekly visits to a daycare centre. Isabel Field herself is having an affair with the brother of Evelyn's neighbour and the story of this relationship is interwoven with that of Evelyn and Muriel's and the birth of the baby...

The story is continued in Hilary Mantel's next novel Vacant Possession.

== Reception ==
- Richard Rayner, writing in the Los Angeles Times, says that the novel "flits about at first, moving slowly while the narrative snowball gets packed. Soon, though, the book acquires a fierce propulsion that drives straight forward into Vacant Possession"
- Publishers Weekly states that "The peculiar dynamics of the mother-daughter relationship, and the complications arising from assorted meddlers, offset the disarmingly chipper narrative tone and well-appointed language" and concludes: "Mantel proves that even early on she was an excellent prose stylist and storyteller, expert at threading quirky characterization with black humour and a somewhat macabre imagination."
- Kathryn Harrison from The New York Times praises Mantel: "A gifted writer whose descriptions convey the infrared precision of a powerful night scope, she provides an amusement that is similarly guilty, detached, even aerial. In a cosmos that spawns a Muriel Axon, there may be no God, but there is the compensation of a godlike perspective: that of the author, who draws her readers into complicity, making them privy to secrets withheld from the suffering.
- Kirkus Reviews is generally positive: "It's all rather feverishly over-plotted (albeit in the poker-faced manner of Beryl Bainbridge and Muriel Spark, to name two obvious influences). But Mantel keeps the pot boiling merrily, fills her story with pungent conversational exchanges and observations, and brings her story to a mordantly funny, improbably moving violent climax. An exhilarating combination of kitchen-sink realism and grim expressionist farce: convincing further proof that Mantel is one of England's best contemporary novelists.
- Narrative Magazine says that Mantel's first novel has a multilayered plot, "a wild amalgam of social satire and gothic motifs, and also a powerful characterization of the lingering effects of abuse...catapulting the reader toward the novel’s violent end."
