= The Assassination of Margaret Thatcher =

2014 short story collection by Hilary Mantel

- Author: Hilary Mantel
- Language: English
- Publisher: Fourth Estate
- Publication date: 30 September 2014
- Publication place: United Kingdom
- Pages: 242

The Assassination of Margaret Thatcher, published in 2014, is a short story collection by Hilary Mantel.

In November 2025, it was announced that the title story of the collection was to be adapted for the stage in a new production at the Liverpool Everyman.
