= Hunterian Museum, London =

English museum of specimens

Hunterian Museum
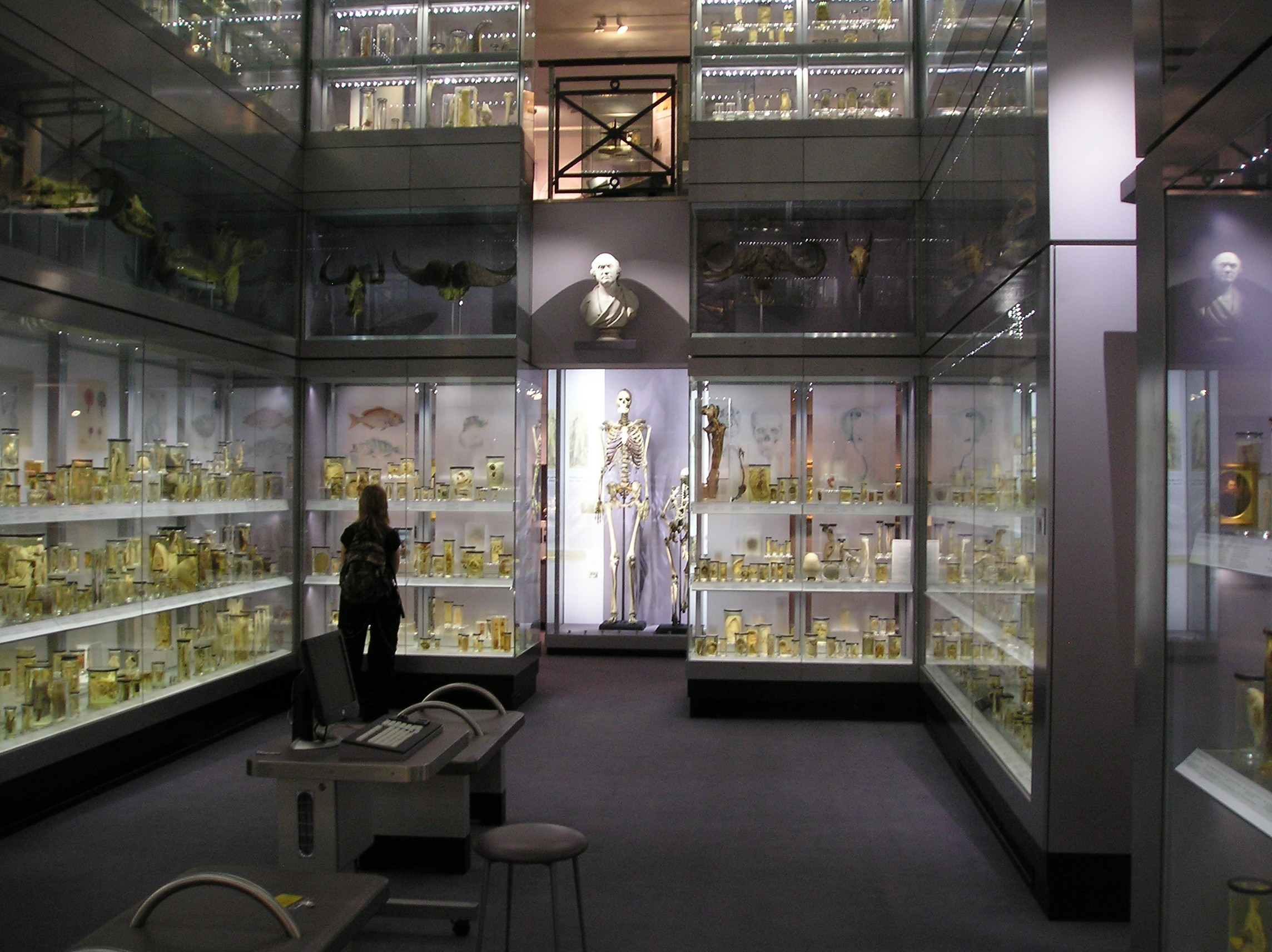
- The museum in 2007. The skeleton of the 7 1/2-foot (2.3 m) tall "Irish Giant" (no longer on display) is visible in the middle of the photo.

- Location within central London
- Established: 1799; 227 years ago
- Location: Royal College of Surgeons of England, Lincoln's Inn Fields, London, England
- Coordinates: 51°30′55″N 0°6′57″W
- Collection size: approximately 3,500 specimens
- Visitors: 85,000 per year
- Public transit access: Holborn

The Hunterian Museum is a museum of anatomical specimens in London, located in the building of the Royal College of Surgeons of England.

== History ==
In 1799 the government purchased the collection of the Scottish surgeon John Hunter which they presented to the college. This formed the basis of the Hunterian Collection, which has since been supplemented by others including an Odontological Collection (curated by A. E. W. Miles until the early 1990s) and the natural history collections of Richard Owen.

The first museum building was considered inadequate in terms of space, and was closed in April 1834 to allow for an expansion project which added additional East and West galleries, completed in February 1837. A third room was added in 1852, and two further galleries were added between 1888 and 1892. In May 1941 the college building was badly damaged by bombs, with Rooms IV and V of the museum being completely destroyed along with their contents. After a slow process of entirely new construction in which some of the original design features were maintained, the Hunterian Museum reopened in a reduced form in 1963.

== Collections ==
The Hunterian Museum is a member of The London Museums of Health & Medicine group, and displays thousands of anatomical specimens, including the Evelyn tables, instruments belonging to Joseph Lister, and the skeleton of the "Irish giant" Charles Byrne (procured against Byrne's dying wishes), surgical equipment, and paintings and sculptures about medical individuals and medicine. The museum's odontological collection includes teeth retrieved from soldiers at the battle of Waterloo, a necklace of human teeth brought to England by explorer Henry Morton Stanley, and a set of dentures belonging to Winston Churchill. The museum also holds the foot an Ancient Egyptian mummy dissected by John Hadley in 16 December 1763. This was the first recorded dissection of a mummy in British history. For reasons that are unclear an onion was attached to the foot at some point prior to the dissection.

The museum closed in May 2017 for renovation work, and reopened on 16 May 2023. As part of the work, Charles Byrne's skeleton was removed from public display, although it was retained in the museum collection to allow for future research.

== Curators ==
- From 1862 until 1884 William Henry Flower was curator of the museum.

== Gallery ==
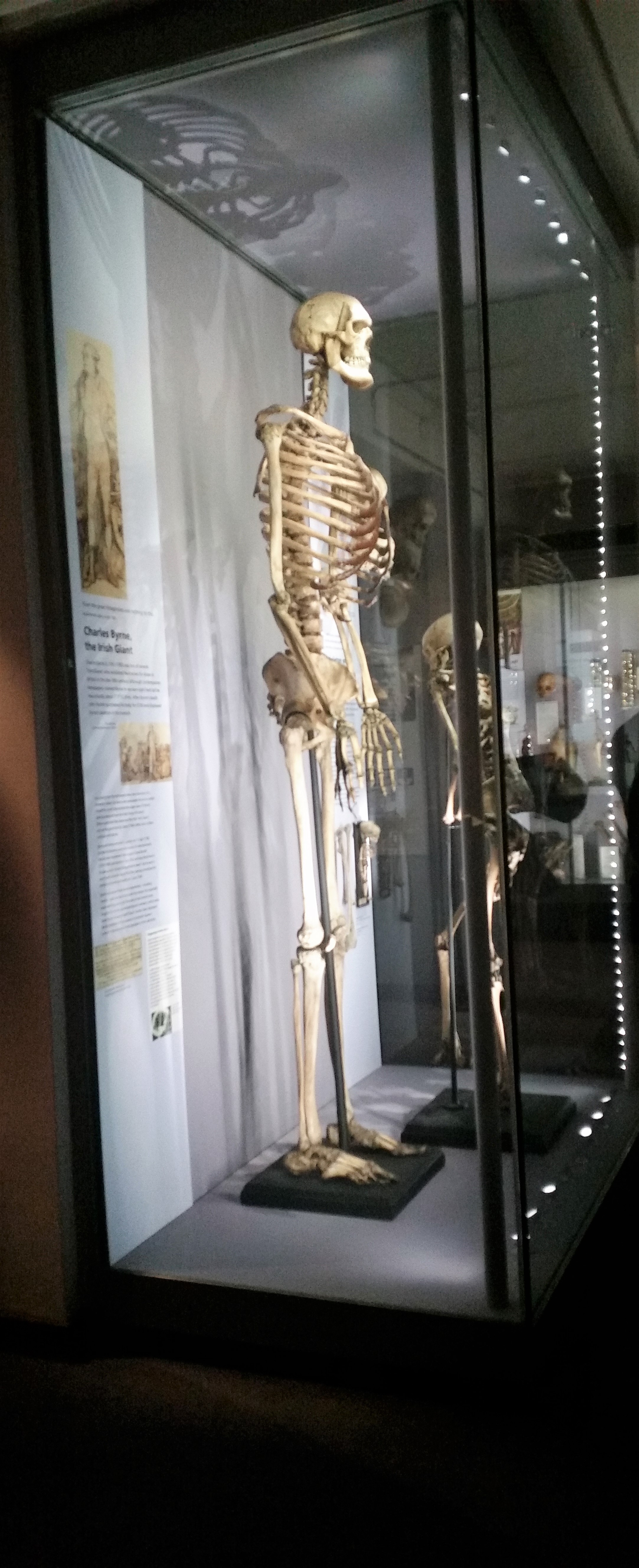
The skeleton of Charles Byrne (1761–1783)

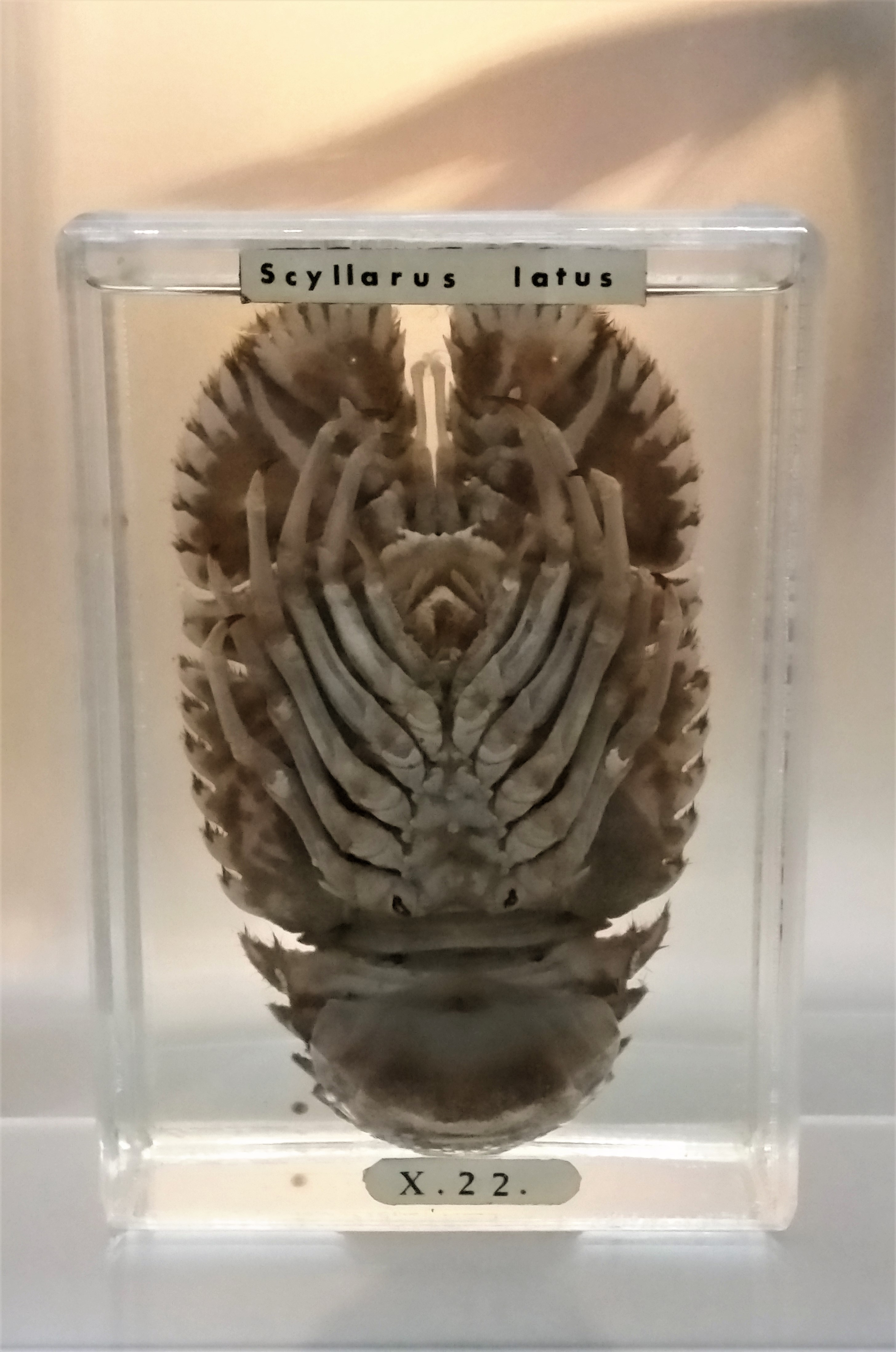
Scyllarides latus, the slipper lobster

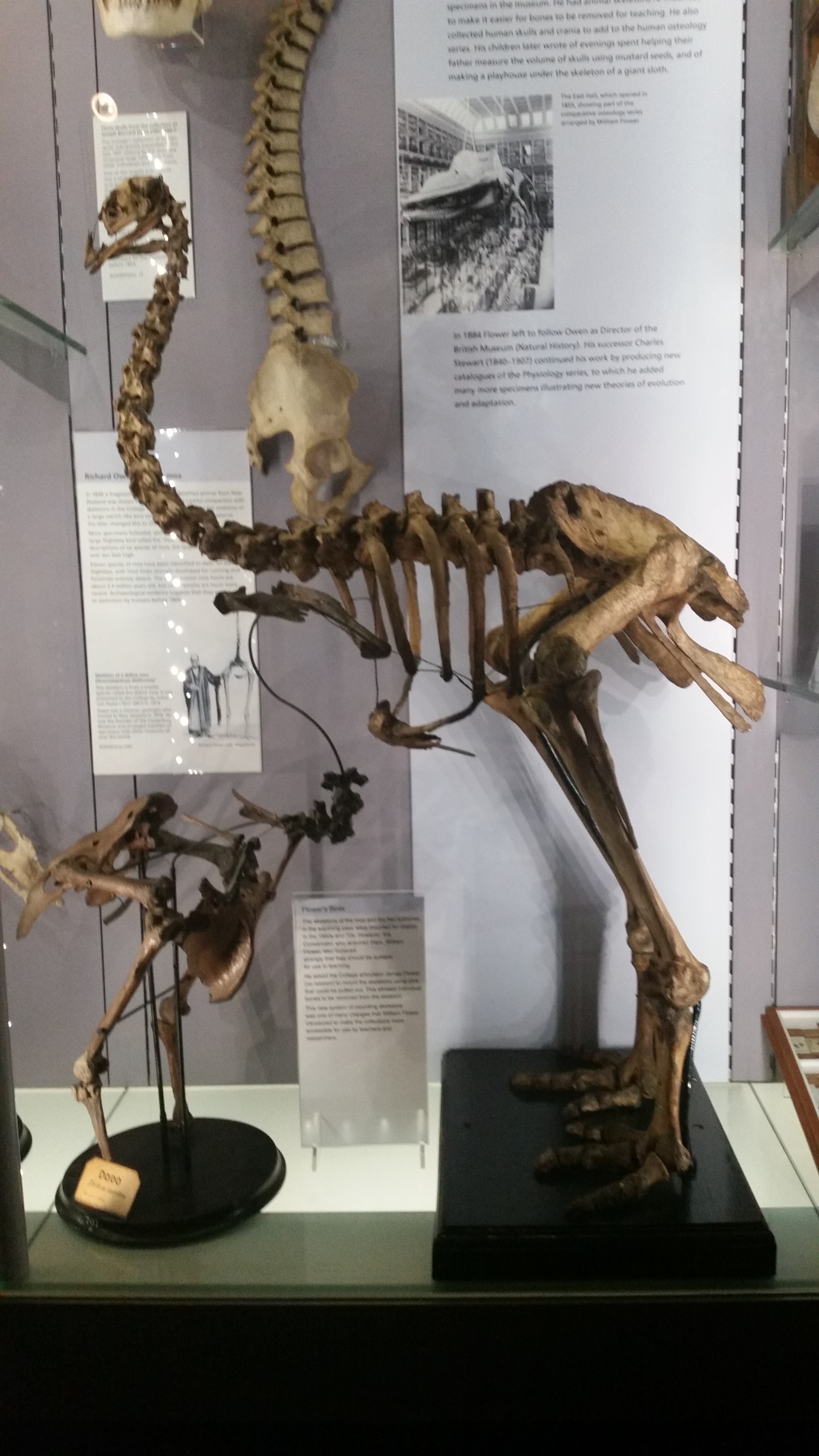
Skeleton of Dinornis novaezealandiae, the extinct North Island giant moa

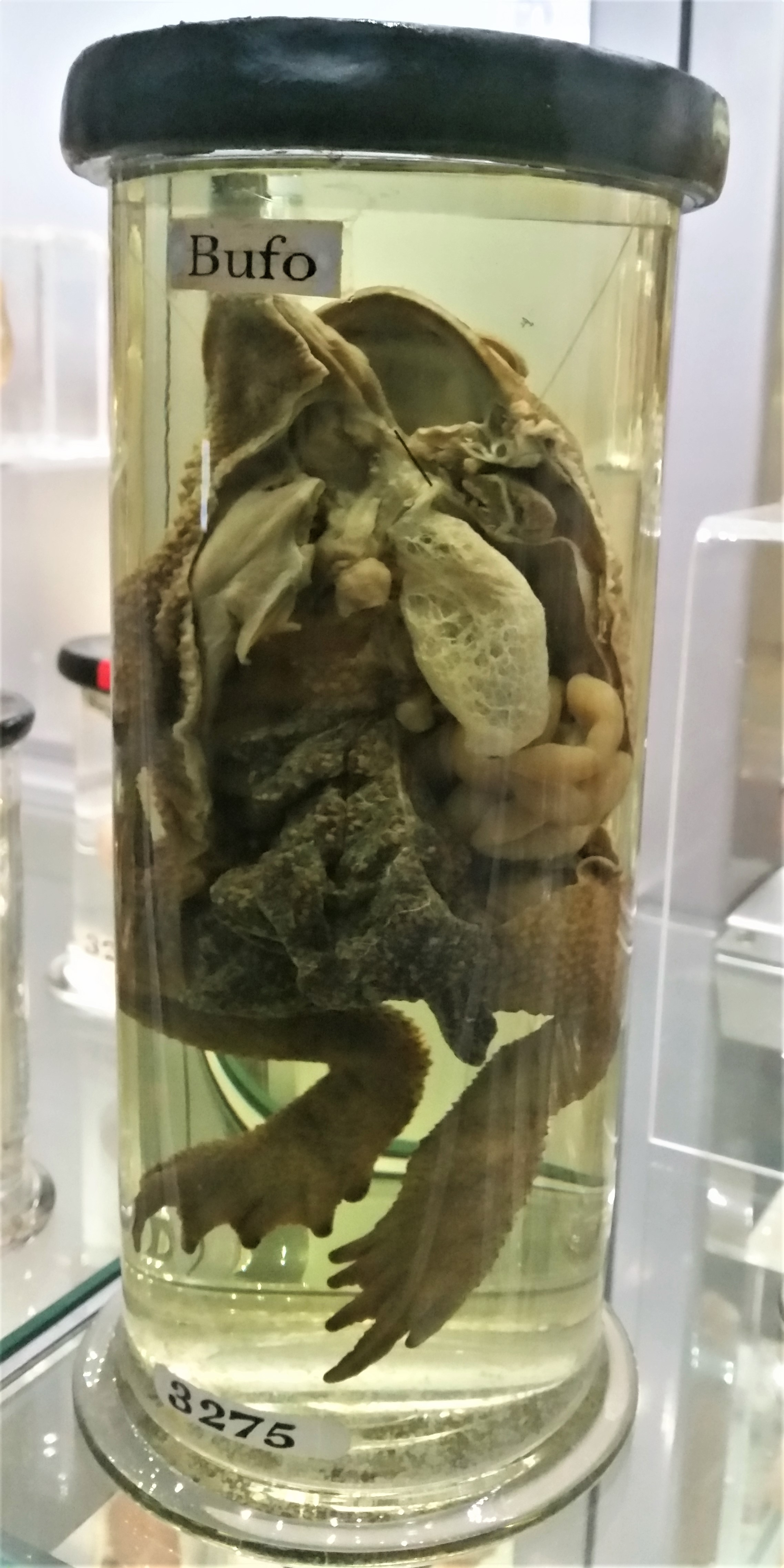
A species of large toad dissected to show ripe ovaries and contracted oviducts
