= Learning to Talk =

Short story collection by English author Hilary Mantel

- First edition
- Author: Hilary Mantel
- Language: English
- Publisher: Fourth Estate
- Publication date: 2003
- Publication place: United Kingdom
- Media type: Print
- Pages: 160
- ISBN: 978-0-0071-66442

Learning to Talk is the first short story collection by English author Hilary Mantel published in 2003 by Fourth Estate.

== Stories ==
Most of the stories are narrated by an adult thinking about their childhoods, many of which were inspired by Hilary Mantel's own childhood.

- King Billy is a Gentleman (New Writing 1992, Minerva): Liam's father has left and is replaced by a lodger, who now provides Liam's mother with his income. Then a family moves next door with two children, who antagonize Liam, revealing that Liam has an Irish Catholic background, bubbling under the sectarianism between the two families.
- Destroyed (Granta issue #63, 1998): Her dog Victor died and was replaced by two puppies, Victor and Mike. The two dogs were very different as they grew up, but her family were not always truthful.
- Curved is the Line of Beauty (TLS #5157): In 1962 the family (except the father) set off to Birmingham in Jack the lodger's car. Jack's friend Jacob was from Africa – the narrator had never met a black man. Then Jacob's niece Tabby arrived and the narrator went for a walk with her where they got lost in a scrapyard.
- Learning to Talk (The London Magazine, 1987): The narrator moved from the Pennines to Cheshire where she took elocution lessons to tone down her northern accent. She never enjoyed the lessons but managed to pass her diploma.
- Third Floor Rising (The Times Magazine, 2000): A mother and then her daughter worked in Affleck & Brown in Manchester.
- The Clean Slate (Woman & Home, 2001): She visits her mother Veronica and reminisces about herself growing up in Derwent, Derbyshire, later submerged by the Ladybower Reservoir. She finds her mother's facts to be full of untruths and exaggerations.

== Reception ==
Elaine Showalter writing in The Guardian praises the collection: "Mantel connects her memories of being a child, and her acceptance of having no child, through gothic images of drastic loss or gain of weight, houses too small or too large, and unfinished stories, long or short, 'unborn' works in progress that haunt her but also drive her forward. These narratives obsess and pursue her: 'The story of my own childhood is a complicated sentence that I am always trying to finish and put behind me.' But that story resists completion; that sentence can never be finally served out. Thus in the autobiographically inspired stories of Learning to Talk, Mantel revisits her childhood and reimagines her past from different perspectives."

Penelope Lively from The Sunday Times also praises the collection: "The smart social historian of the future will do well to pay close attention to Mantel. Never mind the facts and the figures, it is in sparkling writing such as this that the truth is told. Both her memoir and these stories are a maverick vision of growing up acute and disenchanted in the north in the mid-20th century. Both are written with wry, dry wit and are occasionally hilarious."

Jane Gardam in The Spectator is more circumspect: "the mood generally is dark and raw and everything seen by twilight. We see through children's eyes. We watch little posses of children walking thoughtfully on pavements in a sort of fog. They carry mysterious parcels. They are secretive and bewildered. This was 40 years ago. Do we still see them walking along like this with their mates, carrying their amulets? Now they seem to sit alone indoors, eating over a screen. But in some things they may be happier. Neighbours don't often stand dourly by watching a child hounded to suicide by a mad father obsessed by a vegetable patch. Nor do they spurn a child because his mother may be sleeping with her lodger. Nor is it so amazing for a white family to befriend a black family. Nor do we now fear to say 'black' and write it b***k. Or does some of this blanketed, primitive world still exist 'up there'?"
