= Eight Months on Ghazzah Street =

1988 novel by Hilary Mantel

- First edition
- Author: Hilary Mantel
- Publisher: Viking Press
- Publication date: 1988
- Publication place: United Kingdom
- Pages: 278 pp
- ISBN: 0-8050-5203-8
- OCLC: 36017176
- Dewey Decimal: 823/.914 21
- LC Class: PR6063.A438 E35 1997

Eight Months on Ghazzah Street (1988) is the third novel by English author Dame Hilary Mantel, who won the Man Booker Prize in 2009 and 2012. It tells the story of an Englishwoman, Frances Shore, who moves to Jeddah, Saudi Arabia to live with her husband, an engineer.

Based on Mantel's own experiences in Saudi Arabia, the novel explores different peoples' struggles with the contrast in cultures, including those of people of different Islamic cultures, and misunderstandings between the Saudis and Westerners, as well as between women and men. Mantel felt the book anticipated later developments in the culture clash between Islam and the West: "I felt a bit frustrated because as events developed, I had a sort of I-told-you-so feeling."

== Reception ==
Reviewing the book in The Spectator, Anita Brookner wrote of a "tightness of control" and commented that a "peculiar fear emanates from this narrative".

On the book's American publication in 1997, one reviewer described it as "a bold, searingly honest and uncompromising novel"; while another praised "Mantel's knack for leavening her weighty themes with seductive narrative strategies."
