= Anne Hunter =

English salonnière and poet (1742–1821)

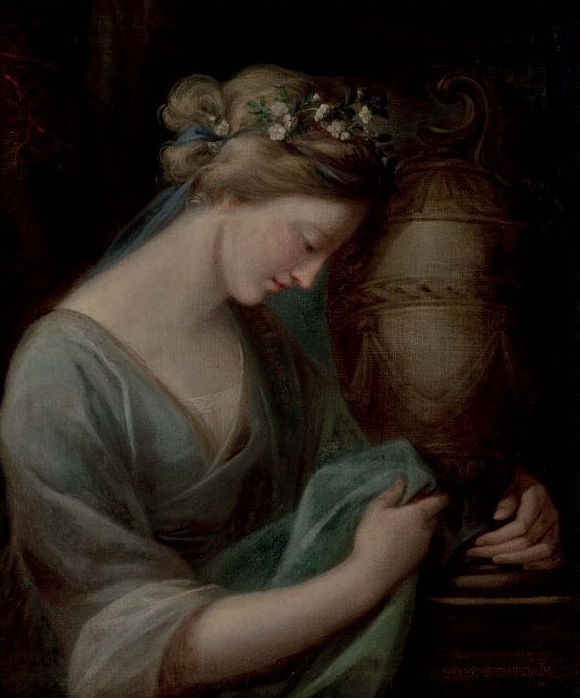
- Female figure weeping over a monumental urn, 1766-1767, attributed to Angelica Kauffmann, using Hunter as model
- Born: 13 March 1742; Waterford
- Died: 7 January 1821 (aged 78); London
- Known for: poetry, bluestocking
- Spouse: John Hunter

Anne Hunter (née Home) (1742 – 7 January 1821) was a salonnière and poet in Georgian London. She is remembered mostly for the texts to at least nine of Joseph Haydn's 14 songs in English. She was the wife of surgeon and anatomist John Hunter, whose anatomical collections in their home eventually formed the basis for the Hunterian Museum. She entertained the leading Bluestockings at their house.

== Biography ==
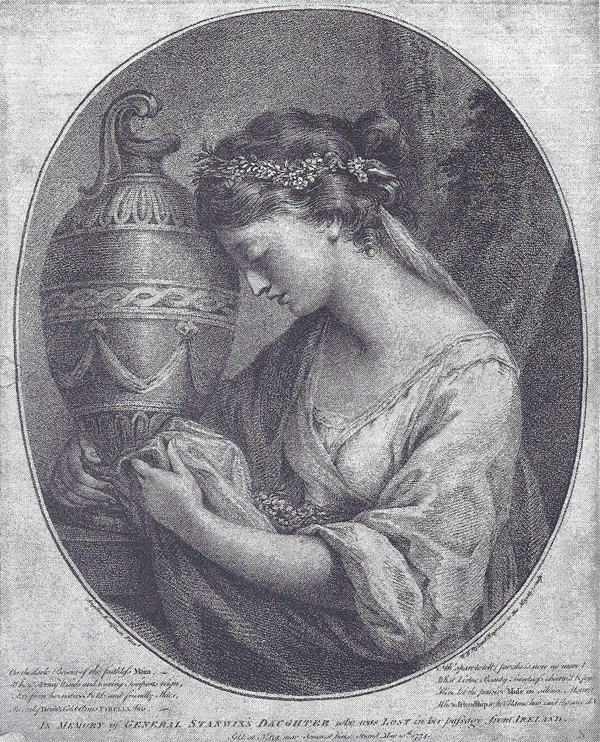
Anne Home as The Pensive Muse, before her marriage to John Hunter. Engraving by W. W. Ryland, after a painting by Angelica Kauffman, 1767, once considered lost.

Hunter was the eldest daughter of surgeon Robert Boyne Home of Greenlaw Castle, Berwickshire. As a young woman, her father supplemented his modest income by taking in lodgers; one of these was Swiss painter Angelica Kauffman similar in age; Hunter and Kauffman became friends. Kauffman used Hunter as a model for her painting Female figure weeping over a monumental urn (in memory of General Stanwick's daughter), even including Hunter's poem, which identifies the subject of the painting as the daughter of General Stanwick, lost in a shipwreck while returning from Ireland on the painting itself.

In July 1771, she married John Hunter, one of the most distinguished scientists and surgeons of his day. Her brother Everard Home was apprenticed to her husband as a surgeon.

Her salons were among the most enjoyable of her time, though not always to her husband's taste. The Bluestockings Elizabeth Carter, Mary Delany, and Elizabeth Montagu were her friends. Her husband's sister was widowed in 1778, which led indirectly to Dorothea and her children moving to London a few years later. Anne Hunter proved an inspiration to the young Joanna Baillie, who devoted herself seriously to writing poetry and drama.

On John Hunter's death in 1793, his widow was left ill provided for. For some time she was indebted for a maintenance partly to the queen's bounty and to the generosity of Dr. Maxwell Garthshore, and partly to the sale of her husband's furniture, library, and curiosities. Her son-in-law, Sir James Campbell of Inverneill, provided her with a small annuity, and in 1799 Parliament voted to give her £15,000 for her husband's collections, which finally placed her in fair circumstances. (This became The Hunterian Museum at the Royal College of Surgeons in London; when his anatomist brother to William died in 1783, he bequeathed his collection to Glasgow, where it became the Hunterian Museum and Art Gallery.)

Anne Hunter had four children, of whom two, a son and a daughter, survived her. She lived in retirement in London till her death on 7 January 1821 at age 78.

== Poetry and songs ==
As a young woman she had gained some note as a lyrical poet, her "Flower of the Forest" appearing in The Lark, an Edinburgh periodical, in 1765. Thirty-two years later she wrote "Sports of the Genii" to a set of graceful drawings by Susan Macdonald (d. 1803), eldest daughter of Lord-chief-baron Macdonald; these display humour and fancy. She published a volume of poems in 1802 which ran to a second edition the following year. The conservative magazine British Critic suggests that her poems show no depth of thought, but have a natural feeling and simplicity of expression, which make many of them worth reading.

Haydn set a number of her songs to music, including "My Mother bids me bind my Hair," originally written to an air of Pleyel's. Her relationship with Haydn is ambiguous, though at the time of his visit she was a widow. Songs by Haydn on her texts include The Mermaid's Song, Fidelity, Pleasing Pain, and The Spirit's Song and a libretto for The Creation, which was based on John Milton's Paradise Lost.
