= A Change of Climate =

1994 book by Hilary Mantel

- First edition (UK)
- Author: Hilary Mantel
- Language: English
- Genre: Literary fiction
- Publisher: Viking Books (UK); Owl Books (US)
- Publication date: 31 March 1994 (UK); 15 July 1997 (US)
- Publication place: United Kingdom
- Media type: Print
- Pages: 352 pp (UK); 336 pp (US)
- ISBN: 9780670830510 (UK); 9780805052053 (US)

A Change of Climate is a novel by English author Hilary Mantel, first published in 1994 by Viking Books. At the time The Observer described it as the best book she had written. It was published in the United States in 1997 by Henry Holt and was recognised by The New York Times Book Review as one of the notable books of that year. The novel has also been identified as one of the best of the 1990s.

== Plot introduction ==
A Change of Climate is set in Norfolk in 1980, and concerns Ralph and Anna Eldred, parents of four children, whose family life threatens to disintegrate in the course of one summer, when memories which they have repressed fiercely for twenty years resurface to disrupt the purposive and peaceful lives they have tried to lead since a catastrophic event overtook them early in their married life. The action of the novel moves back to the late 1950s, when they worked for a missionary society in a dangerous and crowded South African township, and then follows the couple to Bechuanaland, where in the loneliness of a remote mission station an unspeakable loss occurs. The novel is about the possibility or impossibility of forgiveness, the clash of ideals and brutality, and the need to acknowledge that lives are broken before they can begin to be mended.

== Inspiration ==
Mantel states that the idea for the book came in two parts. In Botswana in 1977 she read law reports about medicine murders and the theft of children; later she heard of an 'apparently happily married couple who suddenly split up after doing all the hard work of bringing up a family'. Mantel brought these two parts of the story together to form the novel. She goes on to reveal that the novel was the most difficult she had ever written (as of 2010) as she struggled with its formal plot and structure.

== Reception ==
- complete review concluded that of the reviews it sampled "Most very impressed, but not quite a consensus. Good writing, and most thought she made her points very well".
- Rebecca Radner in San Francisco Chronicle writing "While the suspense builds as we wait to find out what happened in Africa, the book offers an extremely complex inquiry into the nature of good and evil",
- Francine Prose in The New York Times Review of Books with "Some readers may find themselves re-examining their own ideas about the artist's right or obligation to render politically uncomfortable truths. Others may elect not to consider any of this at all, and simply to enjoy Hilary Mantel's smart, astringent and marvelously upsetting fiction".
- However Janet Barron in the New Statesman and Society said "Where the novel disappoints is in its predictability. Once the stories are set in motion, the conclusions seem inevitable, and are indeed signposted throughout... The powerful writing here has been undermined".

== Publication history ==
- 1994, UK, Viking, ISBN 0-670-83051-8, Pub date 31 Mar 1994, Hardback
- 1995, UK, Penguin, ISBN 0-14-012775-5, Pub date 2 Mar 1995, Paperback
- 1995, UK, Ulverscroft, ISBN 0-7089-3350-5, Pub date 1 Aug 1995, Large print
- 1997, US, Owl Books, ISBN 0-8050-5205-4, Pub date Jul 1997, Paperback
- 2003, US, Picador, ISBN 0-312-42288-1, Pub date Sep 2003, Paperback
- 2005, UK, Fourth Estate, ISBN 0-00-717290-7, Pub date 4 Mar 2010, Paperback
- 2010, US, Harper Perennial, ISBN 1-55468-896-5, Paperback
- 2011, UK, Whole Story Audiobooks, ISBN 1-4074-8838-4, Pub date 1 Sep 2011, Audio CD (read by Sandra Duncan)
