= Tessa Harris =

British historical fiction writer

Tessa Harris is a British writer of historical fiction.

== Biography ==
Harris was born in Lincolnshire and attended Oxford University.

She writes historical fiction and is the creator of the six-book Silkstone series featuring Dr Thomas Silkstone, an American anatomist and early forensic scientist. She has also written the three-book Constance Piper series set in Jack the Ripper's Whitechapel. Her novel Beneath a Starless Sky won the Historical Fiction category of the 2021 International Book Awards.

== Bibliography ==
- 2011 — The Anatomist's Apprentice
- 2012 — The Dead Shall Not Rest
- 2013 — The Devil's Breath
- 2014 — The Lazarus Curse
- 2015 — Shadow of the Raven
- 2016 — Secrets in the Stones
- 2017 — The Sixth Victim
- 2018 — The Angel Makers
- 2019 — A Deadly Deception
- 2020 — Beneath a Starless Sky
- 2021 — The Light we Left Behind
- 2021 — 100 Ways to Write a Book - 100 authors in conversation with Alex Pearl about their backgrounds, motivations and working methods.
- 2023 — The Paris Notebook
