= Moyra Donaldson =

Poet and writer from Northern Ireland

- Born: 1956 (age 69–70); Newtownards

Moyra Donaldson (born 1956) is a poet and short story writer from Northern Ireland.

== Early life and education ==
Moyra Donaldson was born in 1956 in, Newtownards, County Down. She attended Queen's University Belfast and the University of Ulster. Donaldson works in social work. She had her first collection published in 1998 to critical acclaim. Donaldson has won a number of awards including the Allingham Award, the National Women's Poetry Competition and the Cuirt New Writing Award as well as four awards from the Arts Council of Northern Ireland. She has had work short listed for the Hennessy New Irish Writing Awards. Donaldson has had her work featured on BBC Radio and television and on the Channel 4 production, Poems to Fall in Love With.

Donaldson is a creative writing tutor and has edited a number of anthologies. She was literary editor for Fortnight magazine. Donaldson is married and they have two daughters.

== Bibliography ==
- Kissing Ghosts (1996)
- Snakeskin Stilettos (1998)
- Beneath The Ice (2001)
- Visions and Priorities (2001)
- The Horse's Nest (2006)
- Miracle Fruit (2010)
- Selected Poems (2012)
- The Goose Tree (2014)
- Blood Horses (2018)
- Carnivorous (2019)
