= Albert Miles =

British academic dentist

- Born: Albert Miles; 1912; London, England
- Died: 2008 (aged 95–96)
- Occupation: Academic Dentist

Albert Edward William ('Loma') Miles (16 Jan 1912 – 16 Mar 2008) was a British academic dentist. He was also Professor of Dental Surgery and Pathology at London Hospital Medical College Dental School between 1950 and 1976, published a number of significant books in the field of academic dentistry, and developed a technique for assessing a subject's age from the extent of wear on the teeth.

== Early life ==
Miles was born in London in 1912, before graduating in both medicine and dentistry from London's Royal Dental Hospital.

== Personal life ==
Throughout his life, Miles was a socialist. He was a 'vociferous' opponent of the 2003 Iraq War. He survived his long-term partner, Diana, by three years.

Significant works include:

- as editor: Structural and Chemical Organisation of Teeth (1967) 2 vols.
- Teeth and Their Origins (1972)
- Variations and Diseases of the Teeth in Animals (1990, with Caroline Grigson)

His final work, a book on the early history of the Royal Army Medical Corps was published posthumously, in 2009.
