= Vacant Possession (novel) =

1986 novel by Hilary Mantel

- First edition
- Author: Hilary Mantel
- Language: English
- Published: 1986 (Chatto and Windus)
- Publication place: United Kingdom
- Media type: Print & eBook
- Pages: 240
- ISBN: 0-7011-3047-4
- OCLC: 12977246
- Preceded by: Every Day is Mother's Day

Vacant Possession is the title of the second novel by British author Hilary Mantel, first published in 1986 by Chatto and Windus. It continues the story from her first novel Every Day is Mother's Day and is set some ten years later with the same cast of characters.

== The novel ==
Muriel Axon has been released from a mental institution under the Care in the Community programme and seeks revenge on those whom she blames for putting her there – Isabel Field her social worker, now unhappily married to an assistant bank manager, Isabel's father who it transpires was the father of Muriel's baby, and Colin Sidney who now lives in Muriel's old house and whose daughter is now pregnant by Isabel's husband. Muriel, who has developed a skill at mimicry and is a master of disguise, manages to infiltrate Colin and Isabel's families with tragic results.

Despite its dark themes the book manages to bring a lot of comedy into these apparently dark situations.
