= John Hunter (surgeon) =

British surgeon (1728–1793)

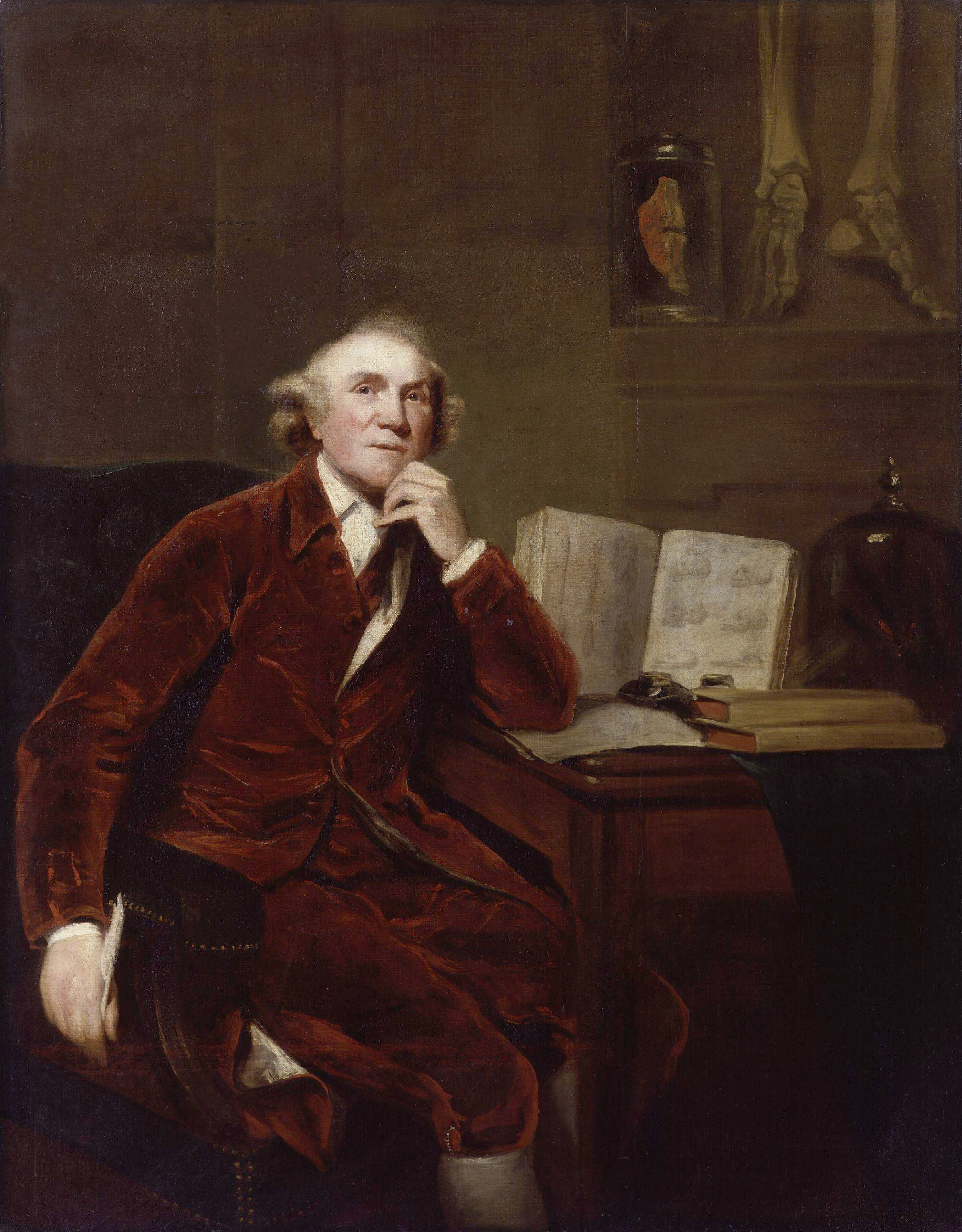
- Portrait by John Jackson, 1813
- Born: 13 February 1728; Long Calderwood near East Kilbride, Scotland
- Died: 16 October 1793 (aged 65); London, England
- Education: St Bartholomew's Hospital
- Known for: Scientific method in medicine Many discoveries in surgery and medicine
- Spouse: Anne Home (m. 1771)
- Medical career
- Profession: Surgeon
- Institutions: St George's Hospital
- Research: Dentistry, gunshot wounds, venereal diseases, digestion, child development, foetal development, lymphatic system
- Awards: Copley Medal (1787)

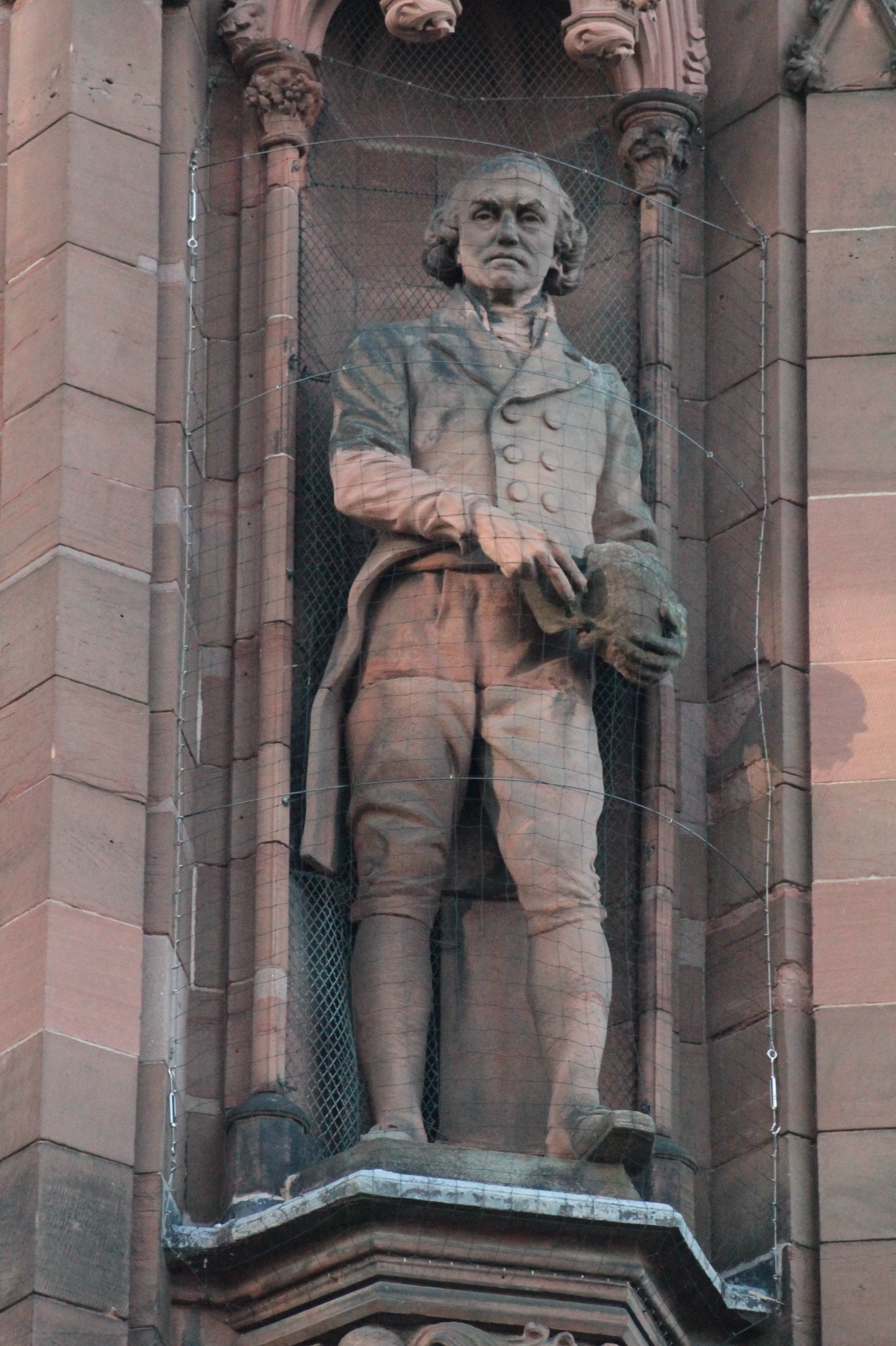
A statue of John Hunter, Scottish National Portrait Gallery

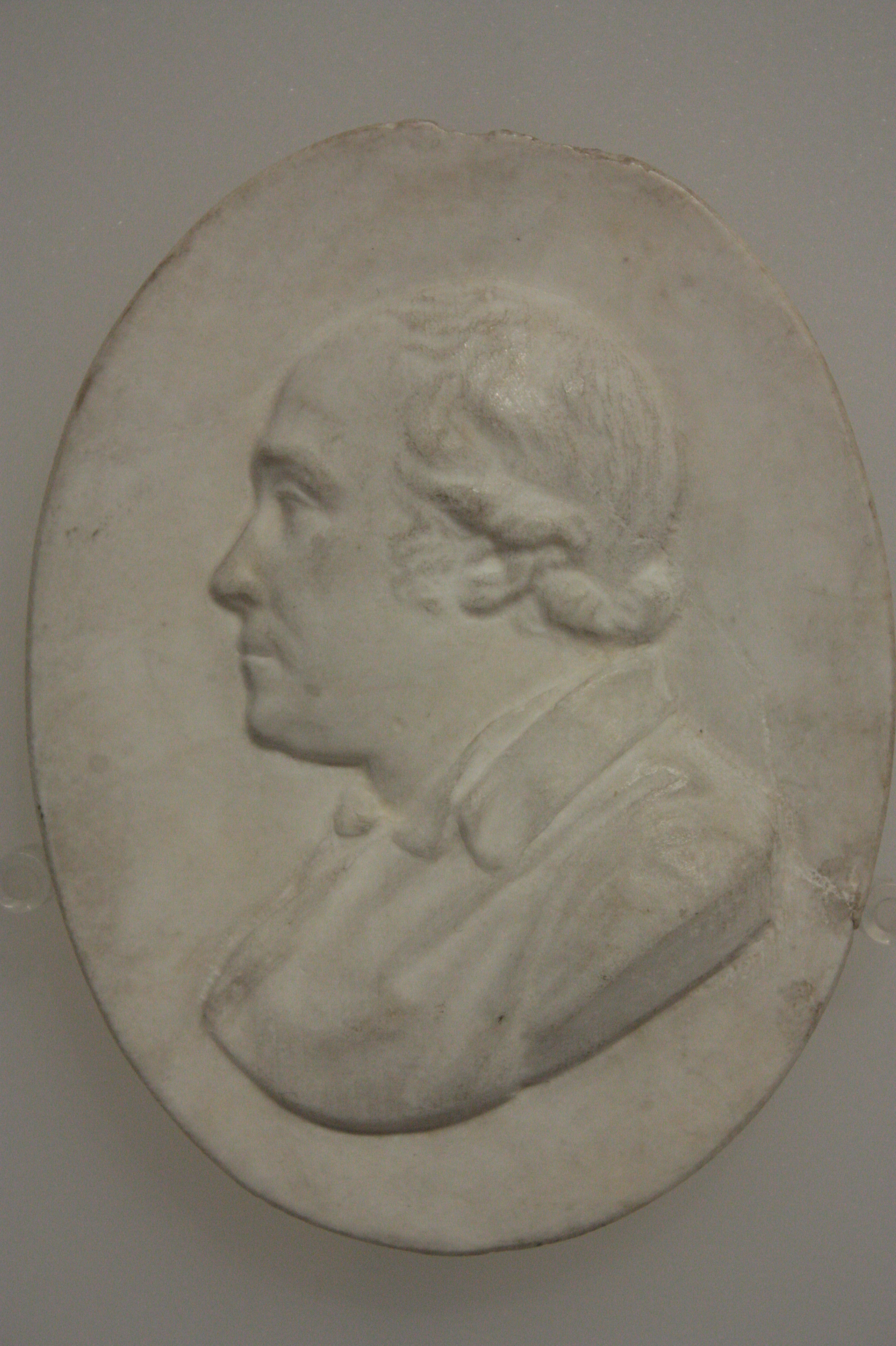
A plaster cast medallion of John Hunter, Science Museum, London

John Hunter (13 February 1728 – 16 October 1793) was a Scottish surgeon, one of the most distinguished scientists and surgeons of his day. He was an early advocate of careful observation and scientific methods in medicine. He was a teacher of, and collaborator with, Edward Jenner, pioneer of the smallpox vaccine. His wife, Anne Hunter (née Home), was a poet, some of whose poems were set to music by Joseph Haydn.

He learned anatomy by assisting his elder brother William with dissections in William's anatomy school in Central London, starting in 1748, and quickly became an expert in anatomy. He spent some years as an Army surgeon, worked with the dentist James Spence conducting tooth transplants, and in 1764 set up his own anatomy school in London. He built up a collection of living animals whose skeletons and other organs he prepared as anatomical specimens, eventually amassing nearly 14,000 preparations demonstrating the anatomy of humans and other vertebrates, including 3,000+ animals.

Hunter became a Fellow of the Royal Society in 1767. He was elected to the American Philosophical Society in 1787. The Hunterian Society of London was named in his honour, and the Hunterian Museum in London preserves his name and his collection of anatomical specimens.

== Early life ==
Hunter was born at Long Calderwood to Agnes Paul (c.1685–1751) and John Hunter (1662/3–1741), the youngest of their ten children. Three of Hunter's siblings (one of whom had also been named John) died of illness before he was born. An elder brother was William Hunter, the anatomist. As a youth, he showed little talent, and helped his brother-in-law as a cabinet-maker.

== Education and training ==
When nearly 21 years old, he visited William in London, where his brother had become an admired teacher of anatomy. Hunter started as his assistant in dissections (1748), and was soon running the practical classes on his own. It has recently been alleged that Hunter's brother William, and his brother's former tutor William Smellie, were responsible for the deaths of many women whose corpses were used for their studies on pregnancy. Hunter is alleged to have been connected to these deaths since at the time he was acting as his brother's assistant.

However, persons who have studied life in Georgian London agree that the number of pregnant women who died in London during the years of Hunter's and Smellie's work was not particularly high for that locality and time; the prevalence of pre-eclampsia – a common condition affecting 10% of all pregnancies, and one which is easily treated today, but for which no treatment was known in Hunter's time – would more than suffice to explain a mortality rate that seems suspiciously high to 21st-century readers. In The Anatomy of the Gravid Uterus Exhibited in Figures, published in 1774, Hunter provides case histories for at least four of the subjects illustrated.

Hunter heavily researched blood while bloodletting patients with various diseases. This helped him develop his theory that inflammation was a bodily response to disease, and was not itself pathological.

Hunter studied under William Cheselden at Chelsea Hospital and Percival Pott at St Bartholomew's Hospital. Hunter also studied with Marie Marguerite Bihéron, a famous anatomist and wax modeller teaching in London; some of the illustrations in his text were likely hers. After qualifying, he worked at St George's Hospital as an assistant surgeon from 1756, then as a surgeon from 1768.

Hunter was commissioned as an Army surgeon in 1760 and was a staff surgeon on an expedition to the French island of Belle Île in 1761, then served in 1762 with the British Army.

== Post-Army career ==
Hunter left the Army in 1763, and spent at least five years working in partnership with James Spence, a well-known London dentist.

Hunter set up his own anatomy school in London in 1764 and started in private surgical practice.

=== Self-experimentation ===
Hunter was elected as a Fellow of the Royal Society in 1767. At this time he was considered the leading authority on venereal diseases, and believed that gonorrhoea and syphilis were caused by a single pathogen. Living in an age when physicians frequently experimented on themselves, he was the subject of an often-repeated legend claiming that he had inoculated himself with gonorrhea, using a needle that was unknowingly contaminated with syphilis. When he contracted both syphilis and gonorrhoea, he claimed it proved his erroneous theory that they were the same underlying venereal disease.

The experiment, reported in Hunter's A Treatise on the Venereal Diseases (part 6 section 2, 1786), does not indicate self-experimentation; this experiment was most likely performed on a third party. Hunter championed the treatment of gonorrhoea and syphilis with mercury and cauterization. Because of Hunter's reputation, knowledge concerning the true nature of gonorrhoea and syphilis was set back, and his theory was not proved to be wrong until 51 years later through research by French physician Philippe Ricord.

=== Late career ===
In 1768, Hunter was appointed as surgeon to St George's Hospital. Later, he became a member of the Company of Surgeons. In 1776, he was appointed surgeon to King George III.

In 1783, Hunter moved to a large house in Leicester Square. The space allowed him to arrange his collection of nearly 14,000 preparations of over 500 species of plants and animals into a teaching museum. The same year, he acquired the skeleton of the 2.31 metres (7 feet 7 inches) Irish giant Charles Byrne against Byrne's clear deathbed wishes—he had asked to be buried at sea. Hunter bribed a member of the funeral party (possibly for £500) and filled the coffin with rocks at an overnight stop, then subsequently published a scientific description of the anatomy and skeleton. "He is now, after having being stolen on the way to his funeral," says legal scholar Thomas Muinzer of the University of Stirling, "on display permanently as a sort of freak exhibit in the memorial museum to the person who screwed him over, effectively." The skeleton was, until 2020, displayed in the Hunterian Museum at the Royal College of Surgeons in London.

In 1786, he was appointed deputy surgeon to the British Army and in March 1790, he was made surgeon general by Prime Minister William Pitt. While in this post, he instituted a reform of the system for appointment and promotion of army surgeons based on experience and merit, rather than the patronage-based system that had been in place.

Hunter's death in 1793 was due to a heart attack brought on during a board meeting at St George's Hospital. Hunter was "met with some things which irritated his mind andnot being perfectly the master of the circumstances he withheld his sentiments, in which state of restraint he went into the next room, and turning around to Dr. Robertson, one of the physicians of the hospital, he gave a deep groan, and dropt down dead," according to an account written by his brother-in-law.

He was originally buried at St Martin-in-the-Fields, but in 1859 was reburied in the north aisle of the nave in Westminster Abbey, reflecting his importance to the country.

Hunter's character has been discussed by biographers:

His nature was kindly and generous, though outwardly rude and repelling.... Later in life, for some private or personal reason, he picked a quarrel with the brother who had formed him and made a man of him, basing the dissension upon a quibble about priority unworthy of so great an investigator. Yet three years later, he lived to mourn this brother's death in tears.

He was described by one of his assistants late in his life as a man 'warm and impatient, readily provoked, and when irritated, not easily soothed'.

== Family ==
In 1771, he married Anne Home, daughter of Robert Boyne Home and sister of Sir Everard Home. They had four children, two of whom died before the age of five. One of his infant children is buried in the churchyard in Kirkheaton, Northumberland, and the gravestone is Grade II listed. Their fourth child, Agnes, married General Sir James Campbell of Inverneill.

== Legacy ==
In 1799, the government purchased Hunter's collection of papers and specimens, which it presented to the Company of Surgeons.

=== Contributions to medicine ===
Hunter helped to improve understanding of human teeth, bone growth and remodelling, inflammation, gunshot wounds, venereal diseases, digestion, the functioning of the lacteals, child development, the separateness of maternal and foetal blood supplies, and the role of the lymphatic system. He carried out the first recorded artificial insemination in 1790 on a linen draper's wife. The adductor canal in the thigh is also known by its eponym "Hunter's canal" after John Hunter.

=== Literary references ===
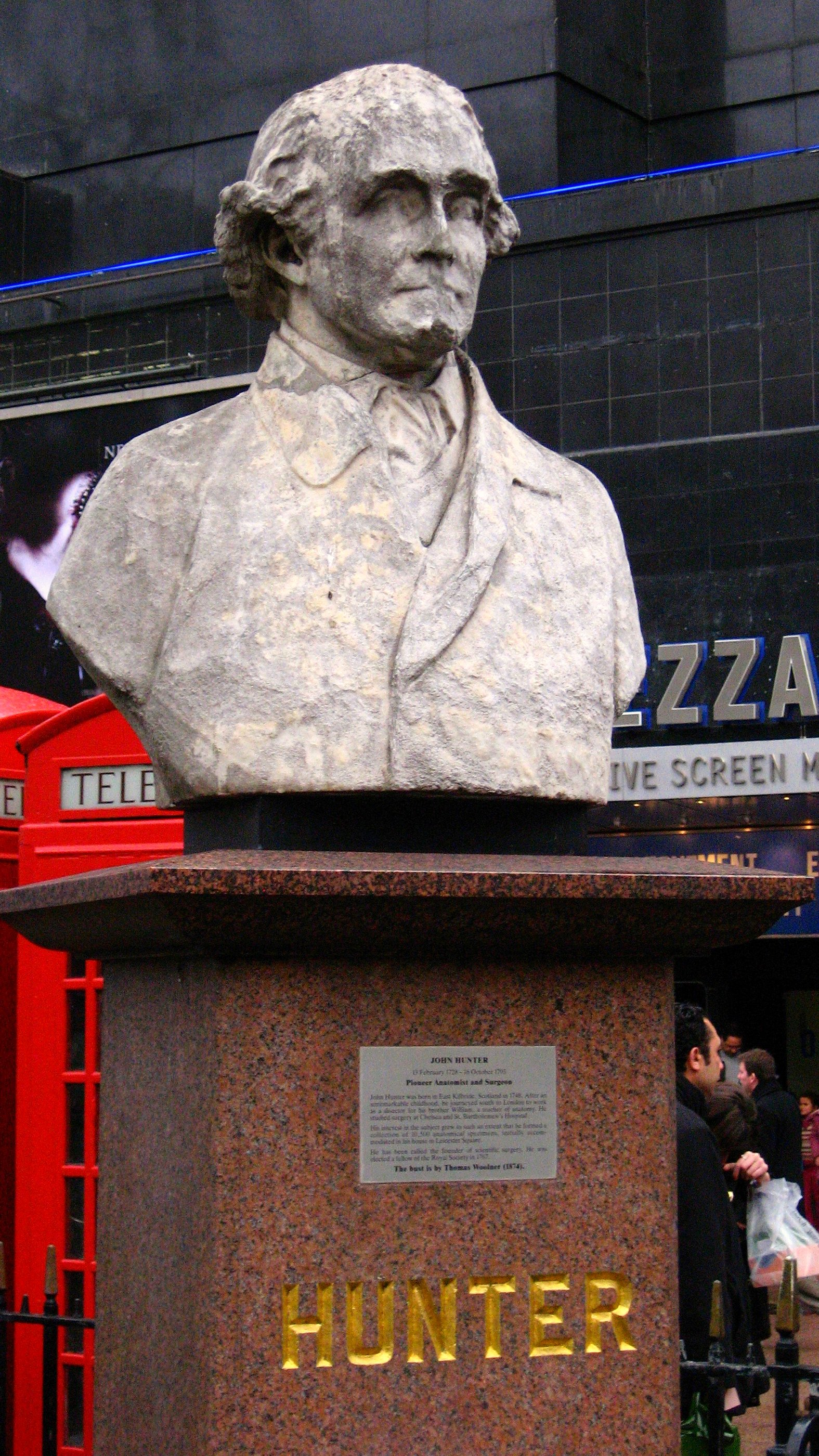
A bust of Hunter near where he lived in Leicester Square, London

Samuel Taylor Coleridge, a key figure in Romantic thought, science, and medicine, saw in Hunter's work the seeds of Romantic medicine, namely as regards his principle of life, which he felt had come from the mind of genius.

WHEN we stand before the bust of John Hunter, or as we enter the magnificent museum furnished by his labours, and pass slowly, with meditative observation through this august temple, which the genius of one great man has raised and dedicated to the wisdom and uniform working of the Creator, we perceive at every step the guidance, we had almost said, the inspiration, of those profound ideas concerning Life, which dawn upon us, indeed, through his written works, but which he has here presented to us in a more perfect language than that of words – the language of God himself, as uttered by Nature. That the true idea of Life existed in the mind of John Hunter I do not entertain the least doubt...

— Coleridge

Hunter was the basis for the character Jack Tearguts in William Blake's 1784 unfinished satirical novel, An Island in the Moon. He is a principal character in Hilary Mantel's 1998 novel, The Giant, O'Brien. Hunter is mentioned by Dr Moreau in Chapter XIV of H. G. Wells's The Island of Doctor Moreau (1896). He appears in the play Mr Foote's Other Leg (2015) as a friend of the actor Samuel Foote.

In Imogen Robertson's 2009 novel, Instruments of Darkness, anatomist Gabriel Crowther advises an acquaintance to seek refuge at his friend Hunter's home for the young Earl of Sussex's party from deadly pursuers released during the Gordon Riots; leopards in Hunter's menagerie killed the would-be assassins, and he envisaged their bodies' dissection. In Jessie Greengrass's novel, Sight, she intercuts her story with the biography of Hunter and other scientists who have dedicated their lives to analysing light and transparency.

His Leicester Square house is said to have been the inspiration for the home of Dr Jekyll of Robert Louis Stevenson's 1886 novel The Strange Case of Dr Jekyll and Mr Hyde.

=== Memorials ===
The John Hunter Clinic of the Chelsea and Westminster Hospital in London is named after him, and the Hunterian Neurosurgical Laboratory of the Johns Hopkins Hospital.

His birthplace in Long Calderwood, Scotland, was preserved as Hunter House Museum. The house is now converted into the Hunter House Coffee Shop, run by the neighbouring Calderwood Baptist Church, with many of the original features still on display.

There had been a bust of Hunter in Leicester Square until the 2010–12 redesign of the square.
