= Winter Warriors =

1997 fantasy novel by David Gemmell

- First edition
- Author: David Gemmell
- Cover artist: John Howe
- Language: English
- Series: Drenai series
- Genre: Fantasy novel
- Publisher: Bantam Press
- Publication date: 1997
- Publication place: United Kingdom
- Media type: Print (Paperback & Hardback)
- ISBN: 9780593037126
- Preceded by: The Legend of Deathwalker
- Followed by: Hero in the Shadows

Winter Warriors, published in 1997, is a novel by the British fantasy writer David Gemmell. It is the eighth book in the Drenai series. It is also the second of three stories that feature in the anthology Drenai Tales Volume Three. The story is set several decades after Gemmell's earlier title, Quest for Lost Heroes, and introduces an entirely new set of characters.

== Plot summary ==
The Drenai army, led by Emperor Skanda, has conquered the hostile Ventrian empire. A man of great charm and even greater ambition, Skanda has unified the two historically hostile people by marrying the Ventrian emperor's daughter, Axiana, who is now pregnant. He has allied with his former enemies, including prince Malikada and his bodyguard and right-hand man, the master swordsman Antikas Karios. Convinced that he needs young men to furnish him with further victories, Skanda unites the Ventrian and Drenai forces and forcibly retires all of the older Drenai soldiers. These include Banelion, the White Wolf, the legendary Drenai general, and three old friends: Nogusta the swordsman, Kebra the archer, and Bison the wrestler. Unbeknownst to all but a few, demons have begun to haunt the imperial city of Usa, their malign influence driving men to commit atrocities. Dagorian, a young staff officer loyal to the White Wolf, investigates a series of murders but runs afoul of prince Malikada's political machinations and is marked for death. Dagorian hides, surviving by his wits.

Nogusta, a master swordsman and tracker, is dispatched to hunt down some Drenai who committed murder and rape. One of them is a friend of Bison's and claims demonic possession is responsible for his uncharacteristic actions. Nogusta does not believe him and carries out the sentence, though he allows the man an honourable death. On his return to the city, Nogusta experiences the first of several visions. A black man and an outsider in the Drenai empire, Nogusta bears a family talisman that sometimes gives him glimpses of the future. Used to prejudice, Nogusta is fiercely loyal to those who know him well, including his friends Kebra and Bison, and his mentor, the general Banelion. Nogusta returns to Usa, but says nothing about his visions. Nogusta and his friends compete in the games held in honor of Skanda's birthday. Shortly thereafter, they were demobilised from the army for being too old. This is especially difficult for Bison, a man of great strength, crude habits, and simple thinking. The three decide to prospect for gold in the nearby hills, rather than march off with Banelion and the other forcibly retired soldiers.

In the city, the priestess Ulmenetha, who is handmaid to the empress Axiana, uses her mystic powers to investigate the chaos and violence growing in the city. While in spirit form she is attacked by demons, but is saved by a mysterious figure made of light. To her horror, she learns that the old emperor, Axiana's father, was not slain in battle but was instead sacrificed in a dark ritual. Shortly thereafter the Ventrian army, led by prince Malikada, betrays and murders the Drenai army. Emperor Skanda is similarly sacrificed.

The architect of these dark plans is the demon lord Anharat. Thousands of years ago Anharat and his people the Windborn ruled over men and fed upon them like cattle. The Windborn were all spirit creatures and ranged from good spirits like dryads to creatures of bloodshed and pain. Anharat's twin brother, the demon lord Emsharas, betrayed his people and joined three human kings rebelling against the Windborn. At the height of a great battle Emsharas cast a mighty spell that cast all the Windborn, including his brother Anharat, back into the formless void. Emsharas then disappeared for millennia, although he did father children upon a mortal woman. Nogusta is in fact the last living descendant of Emsharas, in part because Anharat conspired to have the rest of them murdered. Now Anharat seeks to reverse Emsharas' great spell by sacrificing three kings, allowing the Windborn to take material form and enslave humanity once again. Two of the kings have already fallen and the last is about to be born to Axiana.

Ulmenetha realizes too late that the unsuspecting Axiana has been captured by agents of Anharat. She rescues her alongside Dagorian, whose own investigations made him realize Axiana was in danger. Usa's population begins to riot and murder, driven mad by the growing strength of the demons. Dagorian, Ulmenetha, and the heavily pregnant empress Axiana flee the city in a wagon, taking with them three children they saved from being sacrificed.

Anharat murders and then possesses prince Malikada. He sends Antikas Karios back to the city to re-capture the empress, but the swordsman is troubled by the chaos and slaughter he finds there and begins to investigate. The figure made of light begins to guide and protect him.

Ventrian cavalry officers sent by Malikada/Anharat catch the slow moving wagon in the hills outside of Usa, and Dagorian prepares to die to save his queen. Instead, they are saved by the arrival of Nogusta and Kebra, who easily kill the soldiers. The two groups join forces, for Nogusta's visions have prepared him for what is to come. Sadly, they also show him that several of the companions will die, including one of his dearest friends. Knowing this but not knowing whether they have any chance of success, he still agrees to protect the unborn king.

Back in Usa, the city population is decimated by rioting and bloodshed. Anharat uses this dark energy to summon some of the strongest demons from the void: the Krayakin. These ten soldiers are unclean spirits who feast on endless bloodshed, each responsible for thousands of deaths. Alone, each is deadlier than any but the greatest of human warriors, and together they are nearly unstoppable. They cannot be killed by steel, though they are vulnerable to natural elements like wood and running water. Tracking the queen's protectors by their spirit essence, they begin their hunt.

The prophecy was clear. Upon the death of three kings the world will be plunged into chaos, and all the cast-out demons of history will return to establish a new age of darkness.

Two of the kings are dead. The third, about to be born, is hunted by the Demon Riders of the Krayakin, Lords of the Undead.

All the terrifying forces of evil range against a pregnant queen at bay in a haunted forest. But she is not alone. Three warriors stand with her, the last remnants of the once proud Drenai army. Three old men, ancient heroes, discarded by the king: Nogusta the Swordsman, Kebra the Bowman, and the hulking fighter, Bison.

The fate of empires rests on their fading skills as they journey through a tormented world on a perilous quest to save the unborn king.

== Characters ==
- Nogusta - A Drenai swordmaster carrying a magic talisman which gives the owner visions of the future.
- Kebra - A Drenai archer and friend of Nogusta and Bison.
- Bison - A Drenai wrestler, friend of Nogusta and Kebra.
- Dagorian - A young Drenai officer who gave up his ambition to become a priest following the death of his father.
- Skanda - The Drenai Emperor and ruler of Ventria.
- Axiana - The Ventrian Queen, carrying the child of Skanda.
- Ulmenetha - Priestess, midwife and aide to Axiana.
- Banelion - The White Wolf, general of the old Drenai army.
- Malikada - The first general to Skanda and leader of the Ventrian army.
- Kalizkan - A Ventrian Sorcerer.
- Antikas Karios - The Ventrian champion and swordmaster.
- Conalin - An orphan boy from Usa.
- Pharis - An orphan girl from Usa.
- Zani - A Ventrian investigator in the city watch.
- Orendo - A renegade soldier from the old Drenai army.
