= Waylander =

Waylander may refer to:

- Waylander (band), a Celtic metal band from Northern Ireland
- Waylander (novel), a fantasy novel by David Gemmell
- Waylander the Slayer, the protagonist in the fantasy novel by David Gemmell
