= Stormrider =

Stormrider may refer to:

- Stormrider (novel), by David Gemmell
- StormRider, defunct attraction at Tokyo DisneySea
- Stormrider (Swedish band)
- Stormrider (German band)

== See also ==
- Ride the Storm (disambiguation)
