= Wolf in Shadow =

1987 novel by David Gemmell

Wolf In Shadow
- First edition
- Author: David Gemmell
- Genre: Heroic fantasy Post-apocalyptic fiction Weird West
- Publisher: Century
- Publication date: January 15, 1987
- Media type: print (paperback & hardcover & ebook)
- Pages: 326 (paperback)
- ISBN: 9780099534709
- Followed by: The Last Guardian

Wolf in Shadow (first published in the United States as The Jerusalem Man) is a 1987 post-apocalyptic heroic fantasy novel by British author David Gemmell. It is similar to Gemmell's first book Legend in that Legend arose from Gemmell's own illness with cancer, and Wolf in Shadow was written while he dealt with his mother's cancer and subsequent death.

== Trilogy ==
Initially written as a stand-alone novel, Gemmell expanded it into a trilogy consisting of the novels:

1. Wolf in Shadow (1987)
2. The Last Guardian (1989)
3. Bloodstone (1994)

== Setting ==
Wolf in Shadow is set in the future, three hundred years after the "fall", an apocalyptic event of which little is initially known, but which is regarded in the book as an event akin to Noah's flood in which the world shook out of its orbit tilting it on its axis, which subsequently resulted in the oceans rising and destroying most of human civilization. Several hints are given throughout the novel that this catastrophe might have been due to factors such as pollution and nuclear weapons.

In addition to this setting the novel employs a magic system based on Sipstrassi or stones of power, which are golden meteors which allow one to heal oneself, create food, and who are supposedly limited only by ones imagination, although each stone only has a certain amount of power, and as they are used black veins will appear upon the stone and grow, until eventually the Sipstrassi is coal black, and powerless. However, by feeding Sipstrassi blood one can refill them, although Sipstrassi refilled in this manner become blood red, incapable of healing or producing feed, good only for combat. Additionally blood Sipstrassi inspire darker feelings such as lust, greed, and rage in their wielders.

== Critical reception ==
A score of 8.3/10 is given on the website fantasy book review. However, in the foreword of The Last Guardian Gemmell mentions that while most reviews were either very good or indifferent, one reviewer, Terry Broome publishing in the British journal Vector, greatly disliked the novel. Of his criticisms Gemmell only mentions the line "I dread to think of people who look up to men like Jon Shannow." This review led to the introduction of a character Josiah Broome in subsequent novels, who allowed Gemmell to show a contrast between Shannow, a man unhesitating in using force to combat what he saw as evil, and Broome a man who regarded the use of force as an evil unto itself.
