= Gaius Crastinus =

Gaius Crastinus (c. 85 BC – 48 BC) was a soldier in Julius Caesar's 10th legion during his Gallic Wars.

== Career ==
He had first joined either the 8th or 9th legion in 65 BC, when Pompey had first raised these two legions in Spain. He transferred over to the 10th legion as a junior-grade centurion in 61 BC when it was first formed, after being handpicked by Caesar. After joining the 10th legion, he commanded a centuria. Crastinus fought throughout Caesar's Gallic campaigns, and was present at the Battle of Alesia, where he witnessed the surrender of the Gallic chieftain Vercingetorix to the forces of the Roman Republic. Early in the war, Crastinus commanded his unit as it repelled an attempted crossing of a river by the Helvetii. Crastinus, whom Caesar considered to be amongst his best soldiers, was promoted by Caesar to the rank of Primipilus, or "First File" centurion. This rank was one of exceptional prestige, since centurions of this rank commanded the first (primus), and most important, century in a Legion. With this rank, Crastinus also would have outranked all other centurions in his legion, as it was the highest possible rank of any enlisted Roman soldier.

== Death ==
He died in the Battle of Pharsalus in 48 BC, playing a vital role as he led a forlorn hope party of volunteers in the opening attack against Pompey's line from Caesar's right wing. As reported by Caesar in the De Bello Civili he incited his comrades saying: "Follow me, my old comrades, and give your general true service. Only this battle remains; when it's over he will regain his dignity and we our freedom." Then he turned to Caesar and said: "Today, general, I shall earn your gratitude whether I live or die". He almost broke through the enemy line before being killed by an enemy legionary thrusting a gladius in his mouth. Appianus reports that after the battle Caesar himself was said to be in Crastinus' debt, tributed him heroic rites and erecting an altar.

Historian Ross Cowan advances the hypothesis that Crastinus offered himself as sacrifice to the Underworld Gods to ensure Caesar victory in a Devotio. In this rite, a Roman soldier offered to die in battle and pledged his soul to the gods of the underworld to ensure in exchange the destruction of the enemy. Historian Luciano Canfora likens the figure of Crastinus to that of a political commissar, totally devoted to the Caesarian party to the point of volunteering for a suicide mission.
