= White Wolf =

A white wolf or Arctic wolf is a mammal of the Canidae family and a subspecies of the gray wolf.

It may also refer to:

== Organizations ==
- White Wolf (band), a Canadian heavy metal band
- White Wolf Publishing, American publisher of role-playing games
- White Wolves (UK), a British neo-Nazi organization linked to Combat 18
- White Wolves (South Africa), a fictitious organization that claimed to be behind the Strijdom Square massacre

== People ==
- Chang An-lo or "White Wolf" (born 1948), Taiwanese fugitive and alleged organized crime boss
- Eduard Mammadov or "White Wolf" (born 1978), Azerbaijani kickboxer

=== Fictional characters ===
- Elric of Melniboné or White Wolf, a dark fantasy antihero created by Michael Moorcock
- White Wolf (comics), Marvel Comics character
- White Wolf, an alias of Bucky Barnes in the Marvel Cinematic Universe
- White Wolf, an alias of Jon Snow in Game of Thrones
- Geralt of Rivia, a witcher in the books by Andrzej Sapkowski, also known as White Wolf, or Gwynbleidd
- Vaynard, known as the "White Wolf", the king of the fictitious land of Norgard from Brigandine (video game)
- Aniu, or the White Wolf, a character from the 1995 animated film Balto and its 2002 sequel Balto II: Wolf Quest
- Adelina Amouteru, the main protagonist/antagonist from Marie Lu's "The Young Elites" trilogy goes by the aliases of White Wolf

== Places ==
- White Wolf Campground, a location in Yosemite National Park
- White Wolf Mountain, a 460-acre private ski area in the Lake Tahoe area, California
- White Wolf, California, an unincorporated community in Tuolumne County, California
- White Wolf Fault, a geologic fault in southern California

== Works ==
- White Wolf (magazine), a gaming magazine published between 1986 and 1995.
- White Wolf, a book and a television documentary by Jim Brandenburg about the Arctic wolves of Ellesmere Island
- White Wolf (film), a 1990 Japanese anime film directed by Yosei Maeda
- Weiße Wölfe (White Wolves), a 1969 East German film
- White Wolves: A Cry in the Wild II, a 1993 film directed and written by Catherine Cyran, and a sequel to the 1990 film A Cry in the Wild
- Wise Son: The White Wolf, a 1996 comic book series by Ho Che Anderson
- White Wolf, a 1998 novel by Henrietta Branford
- White Wolf (novel), a 2003 novel by David Gemmell
- "The White Wolf" (fairy tale), a French-language fairy tale
- The White Wolf (audiobook), a 2009 novel by Gary Russell, republished in the anthology The Sarah Jane Adventures Collection

== See also ==
- Arctic wolf (disambiguation)
