= Equestris =

Equestris (Latin for "mounted") may refer to:

- Legio X Equestris, a Roman legion
- Nyon, a town in Switzerland, called "Equestris" during Roman times
