= Lost Heroes =

Lost Heroes may refer to:

- Bletchley Park’s Lost Heroes, a 2011 programme on BBC
- Lost Heroes (ロストヒーローズ) a 2012 video game in the Compati Hero series
- "Lost Heroes" (episode), the series finale of The Batman released in 2008

== See also ==
- Isle of Lost Heroes, a fictional setting in the 1995 book Mydnight's Hero
- Lone Survivor: The Eyewitness Account of Operation Redwing and the Lost Heroes of SEAL Team 10, a 2007 book by Marcus Luttrell
- Quest for Lost Heroes, a 1990 book by David Gemmell
