= White Wolf (novel) =

2003 novel by David Gemmell

- First edition (UK)
- Author: David Gemmell
- Cover artist: John Bolton
- Language: English
- Series: Drenai Series
- Genre: Fantasy novel
- Publisher: Bantam Press (UK); Del Ray Books (US)
- Publication date: 1 April 2003
- Publication place: United Kingdom
- Media type: Print (hardback & paperback)
- Pages: 406 pp (first edition, hardback)
- ISBN: 978-0593044445 (first edition, hardback)
- Preceded by: Hero in the Shadows

White Wolf is a 2003 novel by British fantasy writer David Gemmell. It was the penultimate Drenai Series novel written, but falls between The Legend of Deathwalker and Legend in terms of chronology.

== Plot summary ==
Skilgannon, a former army general, attempts to put his life of violence behind him, becoming a monk. However, this is not to be, as he is forced to confront civil unrest in the realm, meeting Druss the Legend along the way and joining him in his quest to save a friend and his daughter.
