= The Last Guardian (disambiguation) =

The Last Guardian is a 2016 action-adventure game.

The Last Guardian may refer to:

- The Last Guardian (novel), a 1989 novel
- Warcraft: The Last Guardian, a 2002 novel
- Last Guardian of Everness, a 2004 novel
- Artemis Fowl: The Last Guardian, a 2012 novel
