= Vampire: The Eternal Struggle =

Multiplayer collectible card game

Vampire: The Eternal Struggle (previously Jyhad)
- Vampire: The Eternal Struggle's library and crypt card back designs
- Designers: Richard Garfield
- Publishers: Black Chantry Productions
- Players: 2–5
- Setup time: ~ 5 minutes
- Playing time: ~ 2 hours
- Chance: Some
- Age range: 13+
- Skills: Strategy deck-building bluffing

Vampire: The Eternal Struggle (published as Jyhad in the first or "Limited" edition and often abbreviated as V:TES) is a multiplayer collectible card game published by Wizards of the Coast (1994-1996), then White Wolf Publishing (1996-2010) and after several years of hiatus, by Black Chantry Productions (2018-present). It is set in the World of Darkness and is based on the Vampire: The Masquerade roleplaying game.

== Publication history ==
The game was designed in 1994 by Richard Garfield and initially published by Wizards of the Coast and was the third CCG ever created, after Magic: The Gathering and Spellfire. As Garfield's first follow-up to his popular Magic: The Gathering collectible card game, he was eager to prove that the genre was "a form of game as potentially diverse as board games". Richard Garfield noted that the experiences he had while making Magic: The Gathering had helped him to improve his design of the game. In an interview with Robert Goudie, Garfield particularly notes that dedicated multi-player (3+) rules, a lack of resource (or "land") cards, and a more rapid card drawing mechanism (cards normally being replaced instantly after being played) were all features chosen to differentiate this new title.

The first release consisted of 438 cards sold in 76-card starter decks and 19-card booster packs. In 1995 the game was renamed from Jyhad to Vampire: The Eternal Struggle to increase its appeal and distance itself from the Islamic term jihad.

White Wolf published The Eternal Struggle: A Strategy Guide to the Jyhad in 1995, and Wizards published a player's guide Darkness Unveiled in August 1996. After the 1996 Sabbat expansion, Wizards of the Coast abandoned the game, and in 2000 White Wolf took over development.

White Wolf announced that Vampire: The Eternal Struggle would cease production on September 10, 2010.

Several fan-designed sets have appeared between 2010 and 2018, under the player community organization brand of Elder Kindred Network .

On April 24, 2018, Black Chantry Productions, a company founded by prominent members of the tournament scene, announced they had obtained the license to produce Vampire: The Eternal Struggle and return the game to print. Black Chantry as since released a steady stream of new physical products, including in 2020 a five player box set called "Fifth Edition".

== Setting ==
The game is set in the World of Darkness, a table-top role playing game setting which consists of multiple game lines centering various supernatural creatures. V:TES draws mainly from the eponymous Vampire: The Masquerade, though other World of Darkness games are occasionally referenced.

After the events of Gehenna ended the official World of Darkness storyline in 2003, and before the Fifth Edition revival in 2018, V:TES was considered an alternate reality setting. It continued receiving content throughout the 2000s as White Wolf largely focused on to their newer role-playing game setting, Chronicles of Darkness.

In V:TES, each player takes on the role of a Methuselah, an ancient and manipulative vampire, who is not itself present in the struggle, but acts from afar. Each Methuselah will try to eliminate all others by nullifying their influence and power. To that end, the Methuselahs will control and manipulate a number of minions (mostly younger vampires) to attack and destroy the other Methuselahs' resources.

== Gameplay ==
=== Overview ===
The game can be played by any number of two or more players but is ideally played by a group of four or five players. Group play with more than six players is rare, as an individual's turn can easily take two to three minutes, causing a slow game. Two-player games (and to some extent three-player games) also suffer from lack of opportunity for the kind of inter-player alliances and treachery that are a large part of the game.

As in most other collectible card games, each player designs his or her own deck before play begins. Each deck is built with two components:

- "Crypt" - amber-backed cards representing vampires (and in some cases mortal allies) that the player may control during the game.
- "Library" - green-backed cards generally representing assets or actions to be taken during the game.. Most cards in the library can only be used in conjunction with vampires once they have been brought out from the crypt.

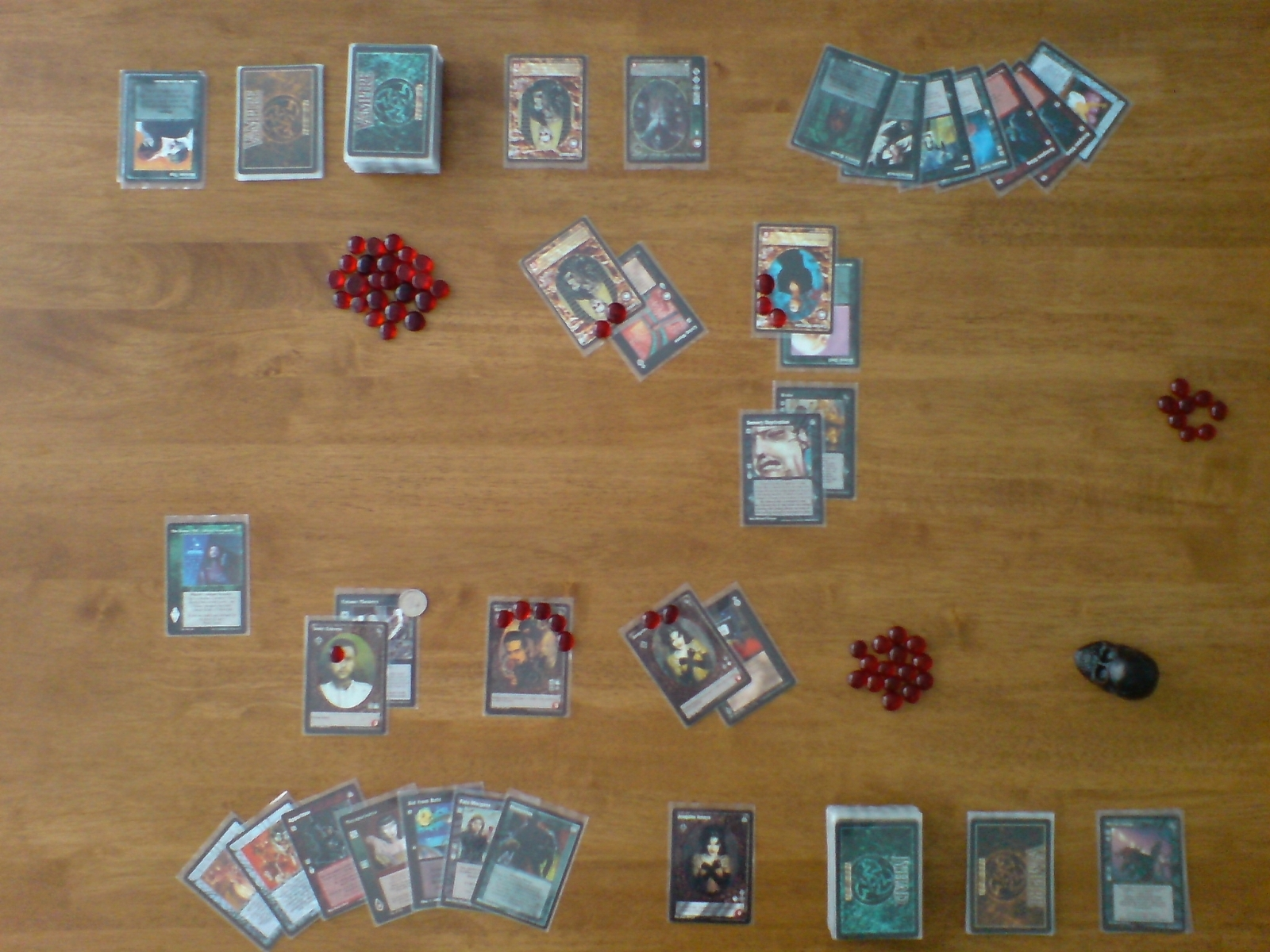
Sample setup of a two-player game.

Each player starts the game with 30 "pool", which represents the player's influence. If a player's pool is reduced to 0, the player is "ousted" and eliminated from the game. The object for each player is to oust their "prey" (the player seated on their left) while defending themselves from their "predator" (the player seated on their right). Each time a player is ousted, their predator gains a victory point and 6 pool, with a bonus victory point for being the last surviving player in the game; when all but one of the players have been eliminated, the player with the most victory points wins.

On a player's turn, they direct their minions to perform a number of actions and attacks, which other players' minions may intercept or interrupt. A player must spend their own pool in order to bring vampires out from their crypt or sometimes to play cards from their hand (as indicated on the card). Therefore, players continually have to make decisions based on how much they want to invest into assets in play and how much to retain to stay alive, especially against other players capable of sudden dangerous "bleeds" (direct attacks on the player's pool).

Gameplay offers many options for alliance or betrayal. Due to the fact that being ousted nets the predator 6 pool, and thus makes him stronger and more dangerous to the next prey, it is not uncommon for players to suddenly start helping a player in a weak situation, or gang up on a player who seems to be getting too strong. This makes forming and shifting alliances part and parcel of the game. Short-term deals and trade-offs (with very fluid terms) are typical, and bluffing is also often used.

Game time varies greatly depending on the number of players and the style of decks played. Games can take anywhere from half an hour to three or more hours (for a 5-player game). In tournament play and in some informal games, a time limit may be imposed, after which all remaining players receive half a victory point in addition to any they may have already received. The standard time limit for a tournament game is 2 hours.

=== Playing styles ===
There are many ways to win in V:TES, though they all depend on eventually wearing down your prey's pool. Some of the most common styles, as described in the official player's guide are:

- Bleed / Stealth Bleed - this deck concentrates on causing as much pool loss as possible, either over the course of multiple turns, or suddenly during a moment of weakness. It usually has some way of ensuring that bleeds are more likely to slip past the defenses, the classical way of which would be playing "stealth" cards.
- Combat / Rush - this type of deck is based on attacking opponents' vampires, rendering them incapable of acting or destroying them outright. After the defense has been whittled away, it then starts bleeding normally. It also defends itself by attacking individual vampires (mainly of its own predator) that pose a threat.
- Political - this deck is geared to take advantage of the political system built into the game. It concentrates on having as many votes (usually via powerful vampires) on the table as possible. It is then able to call and pass its own political actions, which typically include those directly damaging its own prey.
- Build - this deck attempts to survive during the early game while it builds up to later control the table via these accumulated assets, be it vampires, large amounts of reserve pool, votes, or other cards. It is usually combined with another style.
- Intercept / Wall - This deck, often combined with the "Combat" or the "Build" style, tries to intercept the vampires of the prey when they act (and then likely attempts destroying them). Alternatively, it may be a defensive deck slowly building its strength for the late game, using its intercepting abilities to stop itself from being ousted in the meantime.
- Toolbox - this style attempts to be able to do as much as possible of all the styles. It is often a "Build"-style deck at the same time.

All the above deck types have various weaknesses, the most glaring being that a deck should theoretically be able to do everything well enough to take advantage of evolving game situations, and to counter other styles it may come up against. However, if it uses this "Toolbox" approach too strongly, it may spread itself too thin and end up being incapable of following through.

=== Distinct nature ===
V:TES is a game of negotiation, skill, and deck-building. What sets V:TES apart from most other collectible card games is the strong group play element. In general a player will concentrate on the player to his immediate left, his prey, and a player who succeeds in ousting his prey receives a strong boost by gaining 6 additional pool. This boost of resources might possibly enable him to eventually "sweep the table" (gaining momentum with every kill) and oust every other player. Thus there is a tendency for players to help weaker ones to frustrate the stronger players' dominance. This ensures that most players stay in the game longer, instead of the playing field being reduced quickly to those with the best cards and the greatest skill.

These conditions create a game where players are almost always interacting with the other players for both short- and long-term goals instead of simply waiting for their turns. Deals and alliances, both for a moment or for the whole game, can play a big role. A type of card called "political action" cards are designed with this in mind. When a player plays one, a referendum is called in which each player can cast votes, either by using votes granted from cards in play (typically from vampires with a "title" such as a Prince or Bishop) or by playing cards from hand, and the results of the referendum can affect all the players - though which players benefit and which players get hurt are all up to how the votes are cast.

== Sets and expansions ==
White Wolf released V:TES cards in base sets, expansion sets, and mini-expansion sets. The main difference between these are the size of the set and the number of reprints. Black Chantry Productions does not sell randomised products such as booster packs, instead expanding the game with fixed sets of cards, consisting of both waves of preconstructed decks and themed collections and bundles.

The White Wolf sets break down as follows:

- Base sets contain booster packs as well as a number of pre-constructed starter decks (ranging from 3 to 6). The starter decks contain 89 cards (with 77 library and 12 crypt cards) as well as a rule booklet. The booster packs contain 11 cards (in newer sets, often with 7 common, 3 vampire, and 1 rare card, but refer to the table below). The base set should provide a new player with a number of cards to be able to build a wide variety of decks. A base set usually contains a high percentage of reprinted cards from earlier expansions.
- Expansion sets contain booster packs and may contain a number of pre-constructed starter decks. The distribution of cards in boosters and starters is similar to a base set but features a particular theme. New players are usually not able to build a large number of different decks with only cards from this expansion's boosters due to the lack of basic cards provided either in a starter deck or base set. The number of reprints is low and usually restricted to the pre-constructed starter decks.
- Mini-Expansion sets contain only booster packs, and the number of cards are restricted to 60 new cards (20 rare, 20 uncommon, and 20 common cards).

All expansion sets from the Dark Sovereigns expansion onward are identified by an expansion symbol printed in the upper right corner of cards. In newsgroups and on web pages, character codes are used to identify each set, usually an abbreviation of the expansion's name.

Expansion Name	Type	Symbol	Code	Release Date	Total cards (Note: The total cards include the cards from booster and starter, the number in brackets only include those from the booster packs.)	New cards (Note: The new cards include cards from booster and starter packs.)	Booster distribution / Additional info
Jyhad	Base	(none)	Jyhad	August 16, 1994	437	437	11C, 4V, 3U, 1R
Vampire: The Eternal Struggle	Base	(none)	V:TES	September 15, 1995	436	6	11C, 4V, 3U, 1R
Dark Sovereigns	Expansion	Gothic window	DS	December 15, 1995	(173)	173	8C, 4V, 3U
Ancient Hearts	Expansion	Eye of Horus	AH	May 29, 1996	(179)	179	6C, 4V, 2U/R
Sabbat	Expansion	Calligraphy S	Sabbat	October 28, 1996	(410)	340	16C, 5V, 5U, 2R
Sabbat War	Base	Inverted spiked ankh	SW	October 31, 2000	437 (300)	77	5C, 3V, 2U, 1R or 4C, 3V, 3U, 1R (Note: First printing had 5C, 3V, 2U, 1R; which was subsequently changed for second and subsequent print runs into 4C, 3V, 3U, 1R.)
Final Nights	Expansion	Broken ankh	FN	June 11, 2001	386 (162)	170	7C, 3V, 1R
Bloodlines	Expansion	Ankh on red blood spatter	BL	December 3, 2001	(196)	196	7C, 3V, 1R
Camarilla Edition	Base	Ankh	CE	August 19, 2002	547 (385)	115	5C, 3V, 2U, 1R
Anarchs	Expansion	Combined CE/SW Ankhs	Anarchs	May 19, 2003	260 (132)	128	7C, 3V, 1R
Black Hand	Expansion	Handprint	BH	November 17, 2003	286 (136)	145	7C, 3V, 1R
Gehenna	Expansion	Stylised Clock	Gehenna	May 17, 2004	(150)	150	7C, 3V, 1R
Tenth Anniversary	Special	Foil "10"	Tenth	December 13, 2004	190	10	--
Kindred Most Wanted	Expansion	Gun	KMW	February 21, 2005	314 (150)	162	7C, 3V, 1R
Legacies of Blood	Expansion	Split ankh (black)	LoB	November 14, 2005	461 (300)	236	7C, 3V, 1R
Nights of Reckoning	Mini expansion	Plus with circle	NoR	April 10, 2006	(60+17) (Note: Each Nights of Reckoning booster had one rules card. There are 5 different rules printed on 17 different rules cards. These cards, although printed with a different layout and mostly abbreviated card text, are legal in both constructed and limited tournaments.)	60	6C, 3V, 1R, 1X
Third Edition	Base	Tri-snake biohazard	Third	September 4, 2006	537 (390)	160	5C, 3V, 2U, 1R
Sword of Caine	Mini expansion	Bundle of swords	SoC	March 19, 2007	(60)	60	7C, 3V, 1R
Lords of the Night	Expansion	Crown	LotN	September 26, 2007	295 (150)	175	7C, 3V, 1R
Blood Shadowed Court	Special	Silver Ankh	BSC	April 16, 2008	100	0	--
Twilight Rebellion	Mini expansion	Tri-snake on Red Star	TR	May 28, 2008	(60)	60	7C, 3V, 1R
Keepers of Tradition	Base	Castle tower	KoT	November 19, 2008	457 (398)	176	5C, 3V, 2U, 1R
Ebony Kingdom	Mini expansion	Split ankh (white)	EK	May 27, 2009	(62)	60	4C, 3V, 1R, 3C (Note: Unlike the typical booster pack configuration (7C, 3U, 1R) the Ebony Kingdom Booster Packs have the same contents but in a different order: 4 Commons, 3 Uncommons (Vampires), 1 Rare, 3 Commons.)
Heirs to the Blood	Expansion	Three blood drops	HttB	February 3, 2010	TBA (168)	168	7C, 3V, 1R
Danse Macabre	Mini expansion (PDF)	Fanged Skull	DM	October 5, 2013	34	34	--
The Unaligned	Mini expansion (PDF)	Broken Column	TA	October 4, 2014	72	72	--
Storyline Rewards	Mini expansion (PDF)	(none)	SR	February 21, 2015	13	13	--
Anarchs Unbound	Mini expansion (PDF)	Burning ankh	AU	January 17, 2016	42	42	--
Lost Kindred	Mini expansion	Bleeding eye	LK	June 10, 2018	41	41	--
Sabbat Preconstructed	Expansion	Small Ankh	SP	February 16, 2019	125	8	Set of four decks. Den of Fiends (Tzimisce), Libertine Ball (Toreador Antitribu), Pact with Nephandi (Tremere Antitribu) and Parliament of Shadows (Lasombra).
25th Anniversary	Bundle	25 in a circle	25th	2024	--	--	Bundle of classic cards and a standalone Gangrel deck called The Reign of Stanislava.
Fifth Edition	Base set	Small Ankh (Camarilla)	V5	November 30, 2020	495	49	Box set of five decks (Toreador, Ventrue, Nosferatu, Tremere, Malkavian), with rulebook, pool counters, and Edge token. The decks are also sold individually.
Kickstarter	Expansion	--	KSU	Sep 2021	--	--	Four card bundles: Anarchs Unbound, Danse Macabre, The Unaligned 1 and The Unaligned 2.
Fifth Edition Anarchs	Expansion	Small Ankh (Anarch)	V5A	2021	--	--	Set of four decks: Gangrel, Brujah, Ministry and Banu Haqim.
New Blood	Expansion	Red pawn	NB	2022	--	--	Set of four card bundles: Malkavian, Nosferatu, Tremere and Ventrue.
Fall of London	Storyline set	Sceptre, similar to the original Ventrue clan logo	FoL	2022	--	--	Single set of cards for general play, released with rules for a special storyline version of the game, using some of the new cards to depict a specific event in the World of Darkness setting.
Shadows over Berlin	Bundle	Brandenburg Gate	SoB	2023	--	--	Single set of cards for general play.
Echoes of Gehenna	Bundle	Crescent moon (Icon used for event cards)	EoG	2023	--	--	Single set of cards for general play containing many cards of the "event" type.
New Blood 2	Expansion	Red pawn (same as New Blood)	NB2	2023	--	--	Four sets of cards expanding the Fifth Edition Anarch clans.
Fifth Edition Companion	Expansion	Black Ankh	V5C	2024	--	--	Three standalone decks (Tzimisce, Salubri, Ravnos).
30th Anniversary (Toreador)	Bundle	30 in a circle	30th	2024	--	--	Bundle of classic staples and a standalone Toreador deck called The Endless Dance.
Fifth Edition Lasombra	Deck	Black Ankh (Camarilla)	V5L	2024	--	--	--
Fifth Edition Hecata	Deck	Black Ankh (Camarilla)	V5H	2024	--	--	--
New Blood 3	Expansion	Red pawn (Same as New Blood)	NB3	2025	--	--	Expansion for the 2024 decks.
Sabbat Fifth Edition	Expansion	Inverted Ankh (Sabbat)	SV5	2025	--	--	Four decks (Path of Caine, Path of Power and the Inner Voice, Path of Cathari and Path of Death and the Soul), introducing the concept of paths, which function mechanically as a second clan for a vampire.
New Blood 3 Companion	Expansion	Red pawn (same as New Blood)	NB3C	2025	--	--	Expansion for the Fifth Edition Companion decks.

== Reception ==
In a review in issue #10 of Pyramid magazine, Scott Haring stated that while Magic: The Gathering created the collectible card game market, Vampire: The Eternal Struggle established it as a "legitimate game category". He also stated that the game had "pretty good" art, but that the numerous icons would take time to learn.

Ken Carpenter reviewed Jyhad in White Wolf Inphobia #50 (Dec., 1994), rating it a 4.5 out of 5 and stated that "One of the most appealing points of Jyhad is its lack of 'irresistible force meets immovable object' situations. The rules and cards are so straightforward that these situations do not arise. Play is simple, though made up of many steps and decisions (I'd hate to see a flow chart of the game)."

Vampire: The Eternal Struggle was a very popular card game in the 1990s, outselling most other collectible card games on the market at the time, although behind Magic: The Gathering in sales. A common criticism reported from players was its slow play speed. An article in the first issue of InQuest stated that the game is "complicated and takes a while to play" but can be "fiendishly rewarding".

Steve Faragher of Arcane magazine gave the game a score of 7/10, calling it the most "intriguingly political" card game he had played, and praising its storytelling atmosphere. He appreciated the higher play speed that came with the Vampire: The Eternal Struggle re-launch's revised rules, although fellow Arcane staff member Jon Moore still found the game slow to play.

Martin Klimes reviewed the Ancient Hearts expansion for Arcane magazine, rating it an 8 out of 10 overall. Klimes comments that "There is now pretty much always a good attack you can choose, and almost always a choice of defenses against it. Ancient Hearts will add significant interest to your games, which is all you can ask of any expansion."

Jennifer Clarke Wilkes reviewed the Sabbat expansion in the December 1996 issue of The Duelist, stating that as an expansion set it is "remarkably helpful" but that it "falls a little short of its goal" as a standalone set. Andy Butcher reviewed The Sabbat for Arcane magazine, rating it an 8 out of 10 overall, and stated that "The Sabbat is a welcome addition to Vampire: The Eternal Struggle. There's something just a little more satisfying about pitting the Sabbat against the Camarilla, and many of the new cards capture the atmosphere of White Wolf's Vampire: The Masquerade roleplaying game (on which Vampire: The Eternal Struggle is based) perfectly. V:TES was already a dark, brooding game with a lot of vicious backstabbing and nasty politics - with The Sabbat it's even darker."

=== Awards ===
In 2004, Inquest Gamer Magazine picked Vampire: The Eternal Struggle as the all-time best multiplayer collectible card games.

In 2006, Inquest Gamer Fan Awards called the Third Edition expansion the "Best CCG Expansion".

== Reviews ==
- Rollespilsmagasinet Fønix (Danish) (Issue 5 - November/December 1994)
- Review in Shadis

== V:TES Online ==
From December 2005 to the end of 2007 an online implementation of Vampire: The Eternal Struggle named "Vampire: The Eternal Struggle Online" was available. It was developed and maintained by CCG Workshop. Players could create decks and compete online for a monthly fee. White Wolf Publishing had allowed CCG Workshop to release the Camarilla, Anarchs, Final Nights, Legacies of Blood, Black Hand and Kindred Most Wanted sets for online play.
