= Ride the Storm =

Ride the Storm may refer to:

- Ride the Storm (novel), a book by author Dean Koontz
- "Ride the Storm" (song), a single by singer Simon Webbe from the film Fantastic Four: Rise of the Silver Surfer

== See also ==
- Ride Upon the Storm, 2017 Danish television series
- "Riders on the Storm", 1971 song by The Doors
- Stormrider (disambiguation)
