= The First Chronicles of Druss the Legend =

1993 fantasy novel by David Gemmell

- First edition
- Author: David Gemmell
- Cover artist: Fangorn
- Language: English
- Series: Drenai series
- Genre: Fantasy
- Publisher: Legend Books
- Publication date: Oct 1993
- Publication place: United Kingdom
- Media type: Print (Paperback & Hardback)
- Pages: 346 (paperback)
- ISBN: 1-85723-680-7 (paperback)
- Preceded by: Waylander II: In the Realm of the Wolf
- Followed by: The Legend of Deathwalker

The First Chronicles of Druss the Legend is a fantasy novel by British author David Gemmell, first published in 1993. The novel is a prequel to the popular title Legend. The novel details the early life and events of the character Druss, and is followed by The Legend of Deathwalker, which deals with later events in his life between this book and the events in Legend.

== Story ==
The story begins in Druss's village in the Drenai Empire. He is a misfit and socially awkward. While he is away from the village chopping wood, a party of slavers, led by Harib Ka and the master swordsman Collan, comes to the village and kills or enslaves everyone they find. With his dying breath, Druss' father tells him to fetch the family battle-axe (Snaga), which was stolen by his grandfather Bardan. Druss meets the hunter Shadak, who is hunting the slavers to avenge the death of his son, and they join forces to pursue them. Shadak succeeds in interrogating Harib Ka before Druss kills him, and learns that Rowena (who Harib Ka has realised has mystic powers) has been taken to the port of Mashrapur. Druss travels to Mashrapur and meets Shadak's friend Sieben. Together they find out that Rowena will be transported to the distant land of Ventria. Druss attempts to break onto the ship to rescue her, but is ambushed by Collan's men on the dock. Druss is badly wounded but survives, and Shadak reappears to kill Collan. However, they fail to stop the ship from setting sail without them.

When Druss recovers, he and Sieben (who is fleeing a jealous lover's husband) join a group of mercenaries recruited by the Ventrian soldier Bodasen, who is going to support the emperor Gorben in a war in Ventria against the neighbouring Naashanites and rebels. En route, they are attacked by pirates; and during this fight Sieben sees a demon materialise to defend Druss and comes to the conclusion that Druss is possessed. The soldiers arrive in Ventria and succeed in rescuing Gorben from a siege. Gorben is impressed with Druss and promotes him to serve in his elite bodyguard- "The Immortals". Sieben learns from a priest that Snaga is harbouring an evil spirit, but fails to persuade Druss to abandon the weapon. Meanwhile, Rowena has married Michanek, the leading general of the Naashanites. He is an honourable man and becomes concerned when she falls ill. He is told that she is suffering as a result of her mystical powers, and has these removed, along with her memory, in order to save her life.

During a break in the war, Druss goes travelling and loses Snaga in a river. Initially thinking he is free of it, he learns from the a wandering Source priest that it has been found by a brutal warlord, Cajivak. He and the mercenary Varsava set out to recover the axe and kill Cajivak, but Druss is captured and imprisoned in Cajivak's dungeon. At first he wastes away, but with the help of a former prisoner succeeds in regaining his strength and escaping, only to find that Sieben, Varsava and the archer Eskodas have mounted a rescue attempt. Druss kills Cajivak and recovers Snaga, then returns to the army.

By this point in the war the Naashanites are desperate and attempt to use a demon to assassinate Gorben, but he is saved by Druss thanks to Snaga- the only weapon that seems to hurt the demon. Druss also learns that Rowena has married Michanek and that her memory has been erased. He vows to kill Michanek and reclaim Rowena as his own as the army moves to besiege the last Naashanite stronghold, where Michanek has his home. Michanek has learned of Rowena's past and attempts to reconcile her to the idea of going back to Druss, but she will not have it. During the siege, Michanek is killed and Rowena takes poison since she cannot face life alone. Druss is forced to venture into the netherworld to bring her back. Druss eventually succeeds in finding Rowena, and despite a trick of Snaga's, rescues her. In the process he banishes the demon from the axe. Then he and his companions return to Drenai.

The epilogue deals with the events of Skeln Pass, a famous battle late in Druss's career (by this time he is presumed to be in his mid-forties). Gorben has gone mad and invades Drenai, and Druss and Sieben go to Skeln Pass to meet the troops and raise morale. The Ventrians launch a surprise attack, catching the Drenai unprepared, and Druss and Sieben are caught up in the fighting. Under the leadership of Earl Delnar, and with Druss' inspirational presence, the Drenai manage to hold up the Ventrian advance. In a night raid, Druss accidentally kills his old friend Bodasen. The next day, a furious Gorben commits the Immortals, who have never been defeated, to battle. In the fierce fighting that ensues, Sieben is mortally wounded, but Druss and the Drenai manage to hold the Immortals long enough for reinforcements to arrive and win the war. In the rout, Gorben is killed by his own officers.

During the battle, Rowena, who has stayed at home with Sieben's wife Niobe, dies. She tells Niobe that she knew she was dying but sent Druss to Skeln Pass so that he would not have to witness it, as it would break his heart.

== Characters ==
- Druss - Son of Bress. A woodsman come warrior, relentless in his quest to rescue his kidnapped wife.
- Rowena - The wife of Druss, taken by slavers led by Collan and Harib Ka.
- Bress - Son of Bardan, Father of Druss.
- Bardan - The Slayer. Father of Bress, corrupted by the demon within the possessed axe, Snaga
- Shadak - Hunter and swordsman in pursuit of Collan.
- Sieben - Poet and lothario. A friend of Shadak. He carries a baldric of knives.
- Borcha - A hand to hand fighting champion. In business with Collan.
- Bodasen - A ventrian soldier sent to recruit Drenai mercenaries for the war.
- Eskodas - An archer hired by Bodasen and sailing on the Thunderchild
- Milus Bar - Captain of the Thunderchild.
- Pudri - Rowena's servant.
- Calvar Syn - A surgeon in Mashrapur. The character also appears in Legend, as a medic at Dros Delnoch.
- Vintar - A source priest of the temple of the Thirty. The character also appears in Legend.
- Gorben - Emperor of Ventria.
- Collan - A slave trader and master swordsman.
- Harib Ka - A slave trader working with Collan.
- Kabuchek - A ventrian merchant who buys Rowena.
- Michanek - General and champion of the Naashanite army and husband to Rowena.
- Cajivak - An insane warlord corrupted by Snaga.
- Snaga - The demon within the axe.
