= The Legend of Deathwalker =

1996 fantasy novel by David Gemmell

Legend of The Deathwalker
- First edition
- Author: David Gemmell
- Cover artist: Mike Posen
- Language: English
- Series: Drenai Series
- Genre: Heroic fantasy, Fantasy
- Publisher: Bantam Books
- Publication date: April 1996
- Publication place: United Kingdom
- Media type: Print (Paperback & Hardback)
- Pages: 412 (New edition, paperback)
- ISBN: 0-552-14252-2 (New edition, paperback)
- OCLC: 43219468
- Preceded by: The First Chronicles of Druss the Legend
- Followed by: Winter Warriors

The Legend of Deathwalker is a heroic fantasy novel written by British author David Gemmell, it was first published in 1996 and was reprinted in 1999. The book follows on from the novel The First Chronicles of Druss the Legend and was the seventh book to be released in the Drenai Series. It is also one of three stories compiled into a single collection in Drenai Tales Volume Three, along with Winter Warriors and Hero in the Shadows. The book details the life of the character Druss and is set chronologically after the main events in The First Chronicles of Druss the Legend but prior to events in Legend.

== Plot ==
The novel begins during the events in the book Legend; during the defense of the fortress Dros Delnoch from the Nadir, Druss begins to tell a young warrior a story from his past. He tells how he and his friend Sieben travelled to the land of the Gothir and how he became involved in the political affairs there. Owing to a prophecy that the King made, Druss must lose a tournament; when he refuses to do this men are hired to kill him. In the course of the attempt on his life his friend Klay is shot in the spine with a crossbow bolt, leaving him paralyzed and mortally wounded.

To help him Druss travels to the land of the Nadir where a mystic has told him there are gems that can heal any wound. As he travels to the shrine of Nadir hero Oshikai, the Gothir send a force of 2,000 men to destroy it. Druss arrives at the shrine hoping to find the jewels but is unable to do so before the Gothir arrive, and so he helps four Nadir tribes defend the shrine under the guidance of a Gothir-trained Nadir soldier called Talisman. Talisman is on a quest to find "The Uniter", a man with blazing violet eyes called Ulric, who will unite the Nadir tribes after centuries of warfare.

During the defense of the shrine the spirit of Oshikai's wife Shul-sen is released from captivity with the help of Druss and Talisman; the spirit unleashes a storm on the Gothir army and those that are not killed are ordered to withdraw.

Druss' friend Sieben reveals that he has found the jewels which the Nadir call "The Eyes of Alchazzar". He takes them back to Gothir where they find that Klay had died a few days after they left. However, they heal many of the sick in the hospice before returning the jewels to the Nadir. Talisman then calls a meeting of the Nadir tribes in which he smashes the jewels to return the magic and life of the Nadir land.

The book then comes back to the present day where the reader learns that Druss has fallen in combat in the defense of Dros Delnoch. Ulric/Talisman is saddened to learn of this; even though they were on opposing sides he considered Druss a great warrior.
