= The Swords of Night and Day =

2004 novel by David Gemmell

- First edition (UK)
- Author: David Gemmell
- Illustrator: Dale Rippke (map)
- Cover artist: John Bolton
- Language: English
- Series: The Damned
- Subject: Resurrection
- Genre: Fantasy
- Publisher: Bantam Press (UK); Del Rey Books (US)
- Publication date: April 2004
- Publication place: United Kingdom
- Media type: Print (Hardcover, Softcover
- Pages: 492
- ISBN: 0-593-04447-9
- OCLC: 58390504
- Preceded by: White Wolf

The Swords of Night and Day is a fantasy novel by David Gemmell, as well as a pair of legendary swords within the book. They also appear in Gemmell's book White Wolf. The book is set 1000 years following the death of Olek Skilgannon.

The novel is an exploration of the future of the Drenai world, focussing heavily on Jiamads (joinings of beast and men honed to fighting perfection). The story also contains a satisfactory ending to Skilganon's original life, including not only his first demise, but that of Jianna, the Witch Queen with whom he was deeply in love. The story, however, appears to deal broadly with the idea of resurrection and life-after-death, albeit in a living, breathing world. Questions of identity retention and one's place in the world are also raised, with Skilgannon continuously referring to the grief of losing his world, his anger at being returned to fight a battle that is not his and at those who brought him here. Finally, however, there is a strong theme of redemption, in keeping with Gemmell's usual plot lines; despite his having to return to blood and violence Skilgannon has in fact been offered a second chance.

Both swords are mirror polished and extremely sharp, both having been enchanted by the Old Woman. The Sword of Day is golden in colour while the Sword of Night is silver. Intended as inferior copies of the legendary Swords of Blood and Fire, they had become infamous in the hands of Skilgannon.

The swords are frequently mentioned throughout the books as curved blades, and on the two UK hardback covers, are depicted as katanas. The swords are described as being scabbarded in a single, curved sheath roughly five feet in length.

The swords, as with all weapons made by the Old Woman, are possessed to a degree, in a similar manner to Snaga, the axe of Druss the Legend. Rather than a tangible demon, however, the swords simply drive the wielder to blood lust.

The Swords of Blood and Fire are wielded by Decado in this novel. The character of Decado is a darkened mirror of Skilgannon himself, fulfilling Skilgannon's previous role as Jianna's right-hand man. He is the first evidence Skilgannon obtains of his bloodline continuing through Garianne and fulfills a variety of roles, enemy, rival, wayward son and saviour.
