= David Gemmell =

British author of heroic fantasy (1948–2006)

- Born: 1 August 1948; London, United Kingdom
- Died: 28 July 2006 (aged 57); Hastings, UK
- Occupation: Author
- Spouses: Valerie Gemmell, Stella Gemmell
- Writing career
- Pen name: Ross Harding
- Period: 1984–2006
- Genres: Heroic fantasy Historical fantasy

David Andrew Gemmell (/ˈɡɛməl/; 1 August 1948 – 28 July 2006) was a British author of heroic fantasy, best known for his debut novel, Legend. A former journalist and newspaper editor, Gemmell had his first work of fiction published in 1984. He went on to write over thirty novels. Gemmell's works display violence, yet also explore themes of honour, loyalty and redemption. There is always a strong heroic theme but nearly always the heroes are flawed in some way. With over one million copies sold, his work continues to sell worldwide.

The David Gemmell Awards for Fantasy were awarded from 2009 to 2018, with a stated goal to "restore fantasy to its proper place in the literary pantheon". A steering group of 18 authors was chaired by writer Stan Nicholls and the award was decided by a public vote.

== Early life ==
Some of the other children had no father, but their lack was honorable. [Their] Dad died in the war, you know. He was a hero. This boy's lack was the subject of sly whispers from the adults, and open jeering from his peers. This boy's mother was—the boy heard so many times—a whore... the word was less hurtful than the blows that would follow it. Most of the blows came from other children, but sometimes adults too would weigh in.
— David Gemmell on his childhood

David Gemmell was born in 1948 in west London. Raised alone by his mother until the age of 6, he experienced a harsh upbringing in a tough urban area, suffering bullying and taunts from his peers, partly due to the absence of his father, and often sustained serious injuries through fighting. Preferring reading books to fighting, he was compelled to take up boxing by his stepfather, who insisted he learn how to stand up for himself without "hiding behind walls or running away"; this philosophy informed much of Gemmell's later writing. As a child, he said he "would have given anything" to stand beside King Harold II at the Battle of Hastings. As a teenager, he wanted to stand with Marshal Will Kane in the film High Noon.

Gemmell was expelled from school at the age of 16, for organizing a gambling syndicate, and as a youth was arrested several times. He claimed that one psychologist's report at the time labelled him a psychopath.

Gemmell went on to work as a labourer, a lorry-driver's mate, and a nightclub bouncer before his mother set up a job interview with a local newspaper. Of 100 applicants, he was probably the least qualified for the position but was hired owing to his display of arrogance during the interview, which was mistaken for self-confidence. He went on to work as a journalist for several local newspapers in East Sussex, for five of which he eventually became editor-in-chief. He also worked freelance as a stringer for the Daily Mail, Daily Mirror, and Daily Express national newspapers.

Coming from a staunch socialist family, Gemmell carried banners and campaigned for eventual Labour Prime Minister Harold Wilson in the 1960s, although he nevertheless admitted a grudging alignment with Thatcherite policies on issues of foreign policy, especially the Falklands Conflict, and with Reaganite views on East-West relations.

== Writing career ==
Gemmell first attempted writing a novel in the 1970s, but The Man from Miami failed to find a publisher. He later admitted that the book "was so bad it could curdle milk at 50 paces." In 1976, after being diagnosed with a cancer he believed to be terminal, he wrote The Siege of Dros Delnoch to take his mind off his illness and to realise his ambition of having a novel published before he died. Written in two weeks, the novel told of a siege resisted against overwhelming odds, at the time serving as a metaphor for his illness; the fortress at the center of the tale was Gemmell, the invaders were his cancer. Leaving the ending of the novel open, he planned to let the fortress stand or fall dependent upon his own prognosis. When Gemmell later learned that he had suffered a misdiagnosis, he set The Siege of Dros Delnoch to one side until 1980, when a friend read the manuscript and convinced Gemmell to sharpen up the novel to make one last attempt at publication. It was accepted in 1982 and published in 1984 under the new title, Legend, going on to achieve considerable commercial success. Gemmell said that while it had "all the flaws you expect in a first novel", the writing of Legend was "a golden time" in his life, citing it as the favourite of all his novels. He said that while he could "write it better" after becoming an established author, "[its heart] wouldn't be bettered by improving its style." Gemmell's journalism career overlapped with his career writing novels until the publication of his third novel Waylander in 1986, when he was fired after using colleagues' names for characters in the book. Gemmell later said that his managing director had regarded it "a poisonous attack on his integrity."

After the publication of Waylander, Gemmell became an author full-time, writing over thirty novels in total, some as part of long-running series, others as standalone works. Most of his novels were in the heroic fantasy genre; White Knight, Black Swan was a crime thriller, appearing under the pseudonym Ross Harding, and was Gemmell's only novel not to become a bestseller. Two of Gemmell's novels have also been adapted into graphic novel format. Gemmell's books have sold more than one million copies.

== Personal life ==
Gemmell married twice; his first marriage to Valerie produced two children before he met his second wife, Stella who had already been acknowledged in many of his books. The couple made their home in Hastings on the south-east coast of England until the author's death.

== Death, posthumous publication and legacy ==
Gemmell preferring to go to bed late, with his wife favouring an early start, on 28 July 2006 she was surprised to wake up to discover the bed empty. "I thought, 'Oh good, he must be working', and went to take him a cup of tea in his study." Finding him slumped over his desk, she "hoped he was asleep but I knew, really, that he was dead."
— Gemmell's wife recalls his death

In mid-2006, Gemmell was on a trip to Alaska when he became discomforted. He immediately travelled back to the UK, where he underwent quadruple heart bypass surgery in a private London hospital. Within two days he was able to take physical exercise and returned home to resume work on his latest novel. On the morning of 28 July 2006, four days before his 58th birthday, Gemmell was discovered by his wife, slumped over his computer, having died of coronary artery disease.

At the time of his death, Gemmell had completed 70,000 words of the final novel in his Troy series, an alternative-history trilogy based upon the legend of the siege of Troy. Only hours after his death, Gemmell's wife Stella resolved to complete the second half of the novel based upon his chapter plan and notes, and she contacted Gemmell's publisher two weeks after his funeral to make the offer. As a former junior reporter, aspiring novelist, and subeditor, and having been involved in Gemmell's writing process for a number of years, Stella Gemmell felt she was "the only one who could do it." Preparing for the task, she reread her husband's previous work, deconstructing the battle scenes to build her own. Troy: Fall of Kings was published in 2007 under the joint authorship of David and Stella Gemmell.

Up until his death, Gemmell was also patron of the Hastings Writers' Group, following founder member Catherine Cookson. As patron, he was the main judge in the national literary competition run by the group, the Legend Writing Award, which was named after his breakthrough novel. In 2008, the David Gemmell Legend Award was established, intended to "restore fantasy to its proper place in the literary pantheon"; a steering group of 18 authors is chaired by writer Stan Nicholls, and the award is decided by a public vote. At the inaugural ceremony in June 2009, the first recipient was the Polish writer Andrzej Sapkowski, for his novel Blood of Elves. The youngest author to be nominated for this award was 17-year-old Liam Gillen.

Military historian Ross Cowan dedicated For the Glory of Rome: A History of Warriors and Warfare (2007) to Gemmell: "This book is dedicated to the memory of David Gemmell. He wrote about warriors and heroes, many of them ancient Greeks and Romans. His novel Ghost King introduced me to the legend of the Ninth Legion and ignited my interest in the Roman army."

== Influences and themes ==
The Alamo had a big effect on me when I first read about it. Unfortunately I now know the truth about the Alamo ... The Alamo is a consistent story of cock-up after cock-up. Nobody there expected to die. I'm not saying they weren't very brave men. But the whole thing was mismanaged to the point of ineptness ... I don't like to believe that, but it's the reality of life, so perhaps I shouldn't have studied the Alamo. Legend is the Alamo spirit—or what should have been that spirit.
— David Gemmell on the influence of The Alamo

Originally intending to be a historical novelist, Gemmell was intrigued by events which ended badly for the protagonists. Citing the Battle of the Alamo and the grisly fate of William Wallace as influences, he said that had he written about the 13th century Scottish revolutionary, he would have found a way in which Wallace was ultimately victorious despite the odds, then eventually realised this kind of storytelling would be more palatable in a fantasy setting.

Gemmell's work typically deals with themes of honour and loyalty, advancing age, lost causes and the possibility of redemption for even the most corrupt (he was interested in the "true nature" of heroes, considering most to be unreliably so). The consistent presence of redemption in Gemmell's work reflects his Christian beliefs. He claimed that all of his novels have a religious basis, calling them "essentially Christian books" and saying that Christianity stopped him from "promoting the cause of evil" by writing "mindless savagery" in the vein of George G. Gilman's Edge westerns. Often didactic, his work typically features a charismatic warrior tortured by loss and self-doubt, who bands together with a group of unlikely companions to defeat a dark enemy, usually aided by mystical forces. While all his novels are violent, successes are often Pyrrhic and the villains complex.

Gemmell credited his time as a journalist with providing him with his pacey, succinct style, although critics labelled his work "macho" and would often cite his limited vocabulary and the repetitive nature of his stories. Violent events usually provide the sole impetus for plot development, and are resolved by physical violence or heroics.

Gemmell, known for his strong characterisation, attributed this to his tendency to draw from real life; having been acquainted with violent men, he understood and enjoyed writing them. Gemmell based the hero from his novel Legend on his stepfather Bill Woodford, calling men like him "…the havens, the safe harbours of childhood. They are the watch hounds who keep the wolves at bay." Bill reappeared in many of Gemmell's subsequent novels, in many different forms. When Bill died during the writing of Ravenheart, as a tribute Gemmell reworked the novel to give the "Bill" character centre stage. Gemmell has also been cited as saying that a major influence was classic western movies, which is evidenced at the end of Stormrider, the sequel to Ravenheart, when some of his characters enter a mystical world akin to the Native American (First Nation) spirit world. References to John Wayne movies are also found throughout the first two books in the Rigante series, Sword in the Storm and even more-so in Midnight Falcon, where his main character Bane, is a gladiator.

== Works ==
=== Fantasy fiction ===
==== Drenai series ====
1. Legend (1984) (Originally published in the United States by New Infinities Productions as Against the Horde in 1988, re-released as Legend)
2. The King Beyond the Gate (1985)
3. Waylander (1986)
4. Quest for Lost Heroes (1990)
5. Waylander II: In the Realm of the Wolf (1992)
6. The First Chronicles of Druss the Legend (1993)
7. The Legend of Deathwalker (1996)
8. Winter Warriors (1996)
9. Hero in the Shadows (2000)
10. White Wolf (2003) (The Damned Series Book 1)
11. The Swords of Night and Day (2004) (The Damned Series Book 2)

The publishing order of the books does not correspond to the chronology of events that take place in the series. The chronological order is:

1. Knights of Dark Renown
2. Morningstar
3. Waylander
4. Waylander II: In the Realm of the Wolf
5. Hero in the Shadows
6. The First Chronicles of Druss the Legend
7. The Legend of Deathwalker
8. White Wolf
9. Legend
10. The King Beyond the Gate
11. Quest for Lost Heroes
12. Winter Warriors
13. The Swords of Night and Day

Anthologies/omnibuses include:

- Drenai Tales Volume I; contains Waylander, "Druss the Legend" (novelette), Legend, and The King Beyond the Gate
- Drenai Tales Volume II; contains Quest for Lost Heroes, Waylander II and The First Chronicles of Druss the Legend
- Drenai Tales Volume III; contains The Legend of the Deathwalker, Winter Warriors, and Hero in the Shadows

==== Rigante series ====
1. Sword in the Storm (1999)
2. Midnight Falcon (2000)
3. Ravenheart (2001)
4. Stormrider (2002)

==== Stones of Power/Sipstrassi tales ====
This series is known by several names. The entire series deals with the Stones of Power, also known as the Sipstrassi. The first two books contain a re-imagining of the Arthurian legend. The last three novels involve the protagonist Jon Shannow. The first four novels were published in an omnibus edition as Stones of Power: A Sipstrassi Omnibus in 1992.

1. Ghost King (1988)
2. Last Sword of Power (1988)

===== Jon Shannow =====
1. Wolf in Shadow (1987)
2. The Last Guardian (1989)
3. Bloodstone (1994)
- Omnibus: The Complete Chronicles of the Jerusalem Man (1995)

==== Hawk Queen series ====
1. Ironhand's Daughter (1995)
2. The Hawk Eternal (1995)

==== Individual fantasy titles ====
- Knights of Dark Renown (1989)
- Morningstar (1992)
- Dark Moon (1996)
- Echoes of the Great Song (1997)

=== Historical fiction ===
==== Troy series ====
1. Troy: Lord of the Silver Bow (2005)
2. Troy: Shield of Thunder (2006)
3. Troy: Fall of Kings (2007)

==== Greek series ====
1. Lion of Macedon (1990)
2. Dark Prince (1991)

In official printings, these two books (Lion of Macedon, Dark Prince) are grouped with the "Stones of Power" series and contain some of the same characters and assumptions on how the world works.

=== Non-fantasy ===
- White Knight, Black Swan (1993; under the pseudonym Ross Harding, re-released 2017), published by Arrow Books.
- Rhyming Rings (2017; first published 11 years after his death), published by Victor Gollancz.

=== Graphic novels ===
- Both Legend (1984) and Wolf in Shadow (1994) have also been released as graphic novels, with text by Stan Nicholls and artwork by Fangorn and lettering by Elitta Fell.
