= Arctic wolf (disambiguation) =

An arctic wolf is a mammal of the Canidae family and a subspecies of the gray wolf.

It may also refer to:

- Mackenzie River wolf, also known as Mackenzie Arctic Wolf, a subspecies of the gray wolf
- Arctic Wolf Networks, a cybersecurity company
- The Arctic Wolf: Ten Years with the Pack, a 1997 book by L. David Mech
- "Arctic Wolf", a nickname for a contestant in the second season of the television series Maskis Laulja
- Arctic Wolf (microarchitecture), an efficiency core microarchitecture by Intel

== See also ==
- White Wolf (disambiguation)
