= Val Wood =

British author

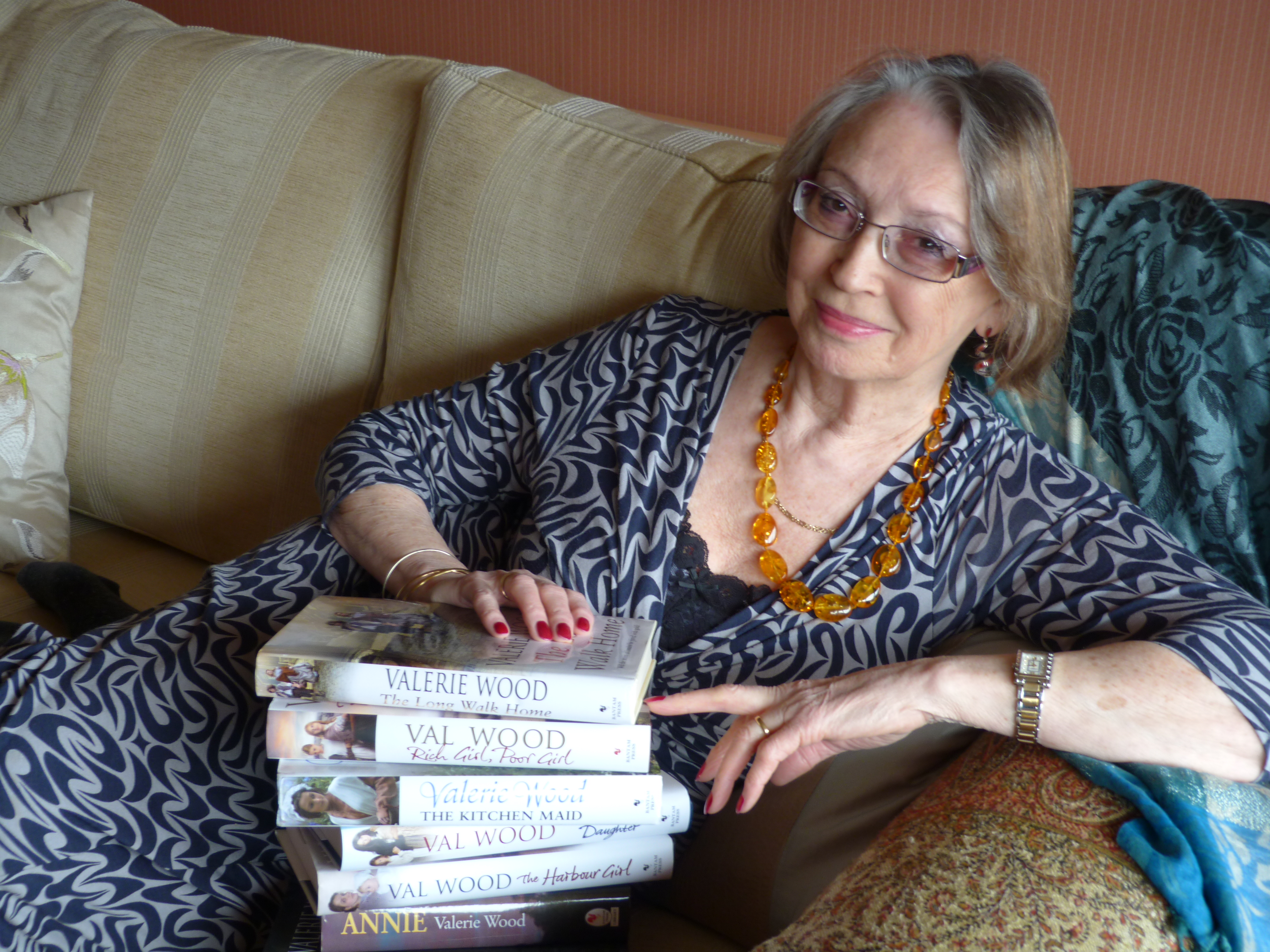
- Val Wood with a selection of her best-selling novels
- Born: Valerie Wood; Castleford, West Yorkshire, England
- Occupation: Author
- Years active: 1993–present
- Website: www.valeriewood.co.uk

Val Wood, also known as Valerie Wood, is a British author of historical romance novels. She has written over 25 novels, all set in and around the city of Kingston upon Hull published by Transworld. She was born in Castleford and lives in Beverley, East Riding of Yorkshire

== Literary career ==
Wood's first novel, The Hungry Tide, was published in 1993 after winning the Catherine Cookson Prize for Romantic Fiction. Wood has released many novels including The Innkeeper's Daughter, and The Doorstep Girls which were named in The Times best-seller list in 2013 and 2015 respectively.

Her 19th novel, His Brother's Wife, was released in September 2013 and reached number 11 in the Bookseller charts. The Hungry Tide was also re-released to celebrate the novel's 20th anniversary along with the rest of the author's back catalogue, many titles of which have made the Times best-seller list.

=== Support for tourism and libraries ===
Val Wood takes inspiration from the heritage of her surroundings, and in 2012 she launched a website and trail to coincide with the release of her novel The Harbour Girl and to promote tourism in both Scarborough and Hull where the novel is set. The trail was promoted via a free library tour in summer 2012. A further trail was created to promote tourism in Beverley and coincided with the reissue of her novel The Kitchen Maid.

Wood is a proponent of the benefits of library services. In November 2012 her catalogue of books were named amongst the top loaned titles in UK libraries on BBC Radio 4's Open Book show presented by Mariella Frostrup and in 2016 Val was featured in the BBC Television documentary series The Books That Made Britain.

== Background and personal life ==
When she is not writing, Wood volunteers for a number of charities including Hull and District Talking Magazine where she has been a reader and editor for 28 years. Wood is also patron of Home Start and Friends of Hull Memory Clinic and has spoken at a number of events to raise awareness of dementia issues. Dementia is an issue close to Wood's heart after losing her husband Peter to dementia in 2009.

In 2016, Val was announced as the Vice President of HERIB and, in 2017, Val was awarded an Honorary Doctorate from The University of Hull.

== Books ==
- The Hungry Tide (1993)
- Annie (1994)
- Children of the Tide (1996)
- The Romany Girl (1998) – also published as The Gypsy Girl
- Emily (1999)
- Going Home (2000)
- Rosa's Island (2001)
- The Doorstep Girls (2002)
- Far from Home (2003)
- The Kitchen Maid (2004)
- The Songbird (2005)
- Nobody's Child (2006)
- Fallen Angels (2007)
- The Long Walk Home (2008)
- Rich Girl, Poor Girl (2009)
- Homecoming Girls (2010)
- The Harbour Girl (2011)
- The Innkeeper's Daughter (2012)
- His Brother's Wife (2013)
- Every Mother's Son (2014)
- Little Girl Lost (2015)
- Steven's War (2016)
- No Place For a Woman (2016)
- A Mother's Choice (2017)
- A Place to Call Home (2018)
- Four Sisters (2019)
- The Lonely Wife (2020)
- Children of Fortune (2021)
