= Hastings Writers' Group =

Hastings Writers' Group is an organisation for published and aspiring writers based in Hastings, East Sussex. It was established in 1947, and is one of the longest-running writers' groups in the United Kingdom. Catherine Cookson was a founder member and was patron for many years. A more recent patron was David Gemmell, a best-selling author of heroic fantasy.

The group runs a national short story competition, the Legend Writing Award, and also produces an annual anthology, Strandline. Strandline won two national awards: Volume 3 won the David St John Thomas Charitable Trust anthology award and Volume 4 won the National Association of Writers' Groups' Denise Robertson Trophy for the best group anthology.

Meetings are held fortnightly on Monday evenings and the programme includes manuscript evenings with constructive criticism, guest speakers, workshops, and competitions with judges from the field of professional writing.
