= Jona Lendering =

Dutch historian (born 1964)

Jona Lendering (born 29 October 1964) is a Dutch historian and the author of books on antiquity, Dutch history and modern management. He has an MA in history from Leiden University and an MA in Mediterranean culture from the Amsterdam Free University, taught history at the Free University, and worked as an archivist employed by the Dutch government, before becoming one of the founders of the history school Livius Onderwijs.

== Career and works ==
Born on 29 October 1964 in Beneden-Leeuwen, Gelderland, Lendering's biography of Alexander the Great (Alexander de Grote) attempted to make greater use than earlier scholars of Persian and Babylonian sources. For example, he argued from Babylonian astronomical diaries that Darius III of Persia was deserted by his troops when he faced Alexander at the Battle of Gaugamela, rather than personally leading the retreat as reported by Greek sources. His work, "Alexander de Grote. De ondergang van het Perzische rijk" was described by Bryn Mawr Classical Review contributor Jan P. Stronk from the University of Amsterdam, as "clear and compelling" and "manifestly written for the general public"-and although not sharing Lendering's love for psychological profiles, Lendering's work may be regarded as an incentive for serious scholars looking to expand their knowledge of new sources of ancient history.

In a passage cited by one commentator as characteristic of recent unsympathetic interpretations of Alexander, Lendering argued that Alexander's respectful treatment of Darius' family was not just an act of chivalry but also a claim to be the "new king". Quality Non-Fiction from Holland called Alexander de Grote "fascinating" and highlighted Lendering's attention to non-Western evidence. However, ancient historian Jan P. Stronk thought it clear from Lendering's book that these sources could at best illuminate specific details of Alexander's life.

Lendering's interest in using western sources in combination with eastern sources can also be discerned in his book on ancient Rome (Stad in marmer), in which he quoted hitherto neglected Talmudic sources, and especially in his book on the legacy of Babylon and the world of Islam to Medieval Europe, Vergeten erfenis.

In the Bryn Mawr Classical Review, Lendering's review of Kaveh Farrokh Shadows in the Desert: Ancient Persia at War was criticized as being "marred by a series of overt inaccuracies, misconceptions and mistakes with respect to the domain of ancient Iranian studies." Lendering was also described by the authors of the response as displaying "a consistent pattern of ignoring seminal works, journal publications, and research that contradict his points of view".

In 2010, Lendering and Arjen Bosman published De rand van het Rijk: de Romeinen en de Lage Landen.

== Livius.org ==
Since 1996, Lendering has maintained Livius, a website containing numerous articles on ancient history. The site is divided into sections on specific regions – Anatolia, Persia, Greece, etc. – and an individual selection of topics is treated for each of these. The Mesopotamian section contains the recently discovered Babylonian Chronicles of the Hellenistic Period.

== Livius Onderwijs ==
Livius Onderwijs is an association of teachers interested in ancient Mediterranean societies. ("Onderwijs" is Dutch for "education".) The association is based in Amsterdam and among other services offers a series of lectures there and elsewhere. It was founded in 2005 by Lendering and Marco Prins.

== Awards ==
After the publication of Lendering's Spijkers op laag water, a book highly critical about the shortcomings of modern classicists, archaeologists, and historians, the research school of Dutch classicists and historians awarded him their annual "Oikos publieksprijs", recognizing Lendering's contributions to explaining Antiquity to a larger audience.

In 2011, he received the Nederlands Klassiek Verbond (Dutch Classical Association) award for his book De rand van het rijk (later translated into English and published as Edge of Empire).

In 2016 he was awarded the Theodor Award (named after Theodor Holman) "for his publications on the importance of the classical heritage and for his relentless struggle against the impoverishment of our culture".

== Selected works ==
- Bedrieglijk echt. Oude papyri, moderne controverses (2020; "Falsely Genuine: Ancient Papyrus, Modern Debate"), Utrecht: Omniboek, ISBN 9789401916783
- Xerxes in Griekenland. De mythische oorlog tussen Oost en West (2019; "Xerxes in Greece: The Mythical War between East and West"), Utrecht: Omniboek, ISBN 9789401916509
- Wahibre-em-achet en andere Grieken. Landverhuizers in de Oudheid (2019; "Wahibre-em-achet and Other Greeks: Migrants in Antiquity"), Utrecht: Omniboek, ISBN 9789401915847
- Het visioen van Constantijn (2018; "The vision of Constantine"), with Vincent Hunink, Utrecht: Omniboek, ISBN 9789401913096
- (with Arjan Bosman) De Rand van het Rijk. De Romeinen en de Lage Landen (2010; "Edge of the Empire. The Romans and the Low Countries"); ISBN 9789025367268
- Spijkers op laag water. Vijftig misverstanden over de Oudheid (2009; "Fifty Common Errors About Antiquity");
- Vergeten erfenis. Oosterse wortels van de westerse cultuur (2009; "Lost Legacy: Eastern Roots of Western Civilization");
- Oorlogsmist. Veldslagen en propaganda in de Oudheid (2006; "Fog of War: Ancient Battles and Battle Narratives");
- Polderdenken. De wortels van de Nederlandse overlegcultuur (2005; "The Roots of the Dutch Consensus Culture");
- Alexander de Grote. De ondergang van het Perzische rijk, (2004, "Alexander the Great: The Demise of the Persian Empire");
- Stad in marmer. Gids voor het antieke Rome aan de hand van tijdgenoten (2002; "The Marble City: Literary Travel Guide of Ancient Rome");
- Archeologie van de futurologie (2000; "A History of Futurology");
- De randen van de aarde. De Romeinen tussen Schelde en Eems (2000; "The Edges of the Earth: The Romans in the Low Countries");
- Een interim-manager in het Romeinse Rijk. Plinius in Bithynië (1999; "An Interim-Manager in the Roman Empire: Pliny in Bithynia")

Lendering is a regular contributor to Ancient Warfare magazine; his books have been translated into Turkish.
