= Ancient Warfare (magazine) =

Dutch military history magazine

Cover of an issue of Ancient Warfare (art by J. Shumate)

Ancient Warfare is a glossy Dutch bi-monthly military history magazine.

== History and profile ==
Ancient Warfare was started in 2007. It is published in Rotterdam by the Dutch publishing company Karwansaray. The magazine was founded by Jasper Oorthuys, who now serves as managing director and editor-in-chief.

Most of the magazine's feature articles focus on a central theme per issue. These include articles on a specific general, campaign or more abstract phenomenon such as sieges. Each issue usually starts off with a historical introduction to the theme. The introduction is usually followed by an article that delves into relevant sources for the theme, such as a historical narrative or an archaeological source. The theme is then fleshed out by articles on warriors, battles and generals that fit that issue's theme. Among the authors are well-known specialists like Bob Bennett, Duncan B. Campbell, Ross Cowan, Lukas de Blois, Stephen English, Adrian Murdoch, Joseph Pietrykowski, Jona Lendering, and Mike Roberts.

The magazine also includes news and letters from readers, as well as reviews of relevant books, games, models, and museums. The illustrations include original artwork, maps and photographs of artifacts. Online free features of the magazine include the editor's blog and a podcast which is published to coincide with the magazine themes.

Other spin-offs were specials on the Battle of the Teutoburg Forest and the nature of the Roman centuria. Since 2012, the yearly special is published in the form of a hardcover book. The first was Edge of Empire (2012), a reworked English translation of an originally Dutch book by Jona Lendering and Arjan Bosman on the Roman occupation of the Low Countries. The second was Henchmen of Ares: Warriors and Warfare in Early Greece (2013) written by then-editor Josho Brouwers and based on his PhD dissertation on Early Greek warfare.

The magazine is registered as ISSN 1874-7019.
