= The Hawk Eternal =

1995 novel by David Gemmell

- First edition
- Author: David Gemmell
- Cover artist: Dominic Lavery
- Language: English
- Genre: Fantasy
- Publisher: Legend Books
- Publication date: 19 October 1995
- Publication place: United Kingdom
- Media type: Hardback and paperback
- Pages: 352
- ISBN: 0-09-935511-6
- OCLC: 60244907
- Preceded by: Ironhand's Daughter

The Hawk Eternal is a 1995 fantasy novel by British writer David Gemmell. It is the sequel to Ironhand's Daughter.

== Plot summary ==
=== Chapter 1 ===
Caswallon, a Farlain clansman, watches the Aenir tear apart Ateris of the lowlands.

Gaelen, an orphaned Lowlander child thief, saved by Caswallon from the Aenir. He is tended of his wounds by Oracle, who tells him about the clans.

Caswallon, Maeg, and Oracle discuss the Aenir threat and Gaelen.

=== Chapter 2 ===
Gaelen continues to heal, learns clan history from Oracle. Caswallon adopts Gaelen as his son. After Gaelen is healed, Caswallon and Gaelen wander the Farlain woods, and Caswallon teaches Gaelen how to survive as a clansman (hunting, fighting, etc.). However, they discover that the Aenir have been following them in the woods, so they attack the trio of Aenir and run off. We are introduced to Taliesen, who speaks with Oracle. Maggrig goes to see Caswallon and Maeg.

=== Chapter 3 ===
Gaelen goes out to meet the other boys of the Farlain clan, but because he is a Lowlander, Agwaine and his friends do not accept Gaelen and they plan to play a joke him. However, Gaelen is protected and befriended by Layne, Lennox, Gwalchmai, and he prepares for the Hunt with them.

Caswallon talks to Leofas, an influential older clansman, to convince him that Aenir are a threat.

Caswallon is concerned because the Aenir have been invited to watch the hunt, and we are introduced to the beast. The Hunt begins, and Gwalchmai beats Agwaine in finding the clue.

=== Chapter 4 ===
While Gaelen's group and Agwaine's group compete in the Hunt, the clansmen have been notified of the beast, and the Hunt has been cancelled. However, their groups are not found in time, and three of Agwaine's group members were slaughtered by the monster.

The five boys first meet the Hawk Queen, and she helps them defeat the beast but is also killed. Gaelen is confused when the Queen tells him they will meet again.

=== Chapter 5 ===
The Queen and the boys are buried, and everyone reflects on the current events. Caswallon and Cambil argue on who will become the next Hunt Lord, Gaelen or Agwaine.

Oracle reveals his story to Caswallon: In other kingdom, he revealed the secrets of the Gates to another man in order to align with him, the man betrayed him and brought his Aenir to the current world. Life went on, Lennox became stronger, others recognize Gaelen's natural leadership.

The Games occur, all the boys compete in their events. A year drifts by, Gaelen begins to have a crush on Deva, Caswallon gets angry when Cambil invites Aenir to Summer Games. Taliesen the druid searches for the Hawk Queen. Aenir plan to use the invitation to scout the clan lands, and prepare to participate in the Games.

=== Chapter 6 ===
The Games begin, and many of the clans are not happy with Cambil's decision to allow the Aenir to participate. Cambil realizes his mistake, as an overall Aenir victory moves from possibility to probability. Only the Farlain have a chance of defeating the Aenir, but the evil Aenir wound Gaelen before the final race. Agwaine is forced to run against the top Aenir runner, and after an Aenir cheating scheme is foiled, Agwaine wins the race. Lennox wins the throwing challenge, and the Farlain squeak by with the Game victory. They celebrate and get drunk at the Whorl Dance.

=== Chapter 7 ===
Another winter passes by, and in the spring the Aenir begin their horrible attack on the clans. The Haesten clan is massacred as the few survivors stream into the mountains, while the Pallides escape just in time and head towards the Farlain.

Meanwhile, in the Farlain Taliesen tells Caswallon that the Aenir are coming, and the war horn is sounded. However, Cambil will not believe that the Aenir would attack, and he and a few others decide not to escape with Caswallon. Cambil and his followers (including Kareen) pay with their lives, although Agwaine escapes at the last moment.

Gaelen, however, was alone in the mountains when the Aenir attacked. Deva's scream pierces the woods, and Gaelen runs and saves her from the Aenir. It is evident that the Aenir have attacked, and after defeating a few scouts the pair head north in search of the rest of the Farlain clan.

=== Chapter 8 ===
Gaelen and Deva continue north, narrowly escaping another Aenir camp. Deva tells Gaelen that he cannot marry him, because a fortune teller has told her she is to marry a king and be the mother of kings.

Meanwhile, Caswallon continues to march to the Gates with the Farlain, and sends out many scouts to watch for the Aenir and for other clansmen. Caswallon speaks to Taliesen, whose plan it is to bring the clans through the Gates to a time many thousand years ago. Oracle dies of old age.

Meanwhile, Maggrig, Hunt Lord of the Pallides, realizes his people have few options, and prepares to make a last stand against the Aenir. The Pallides defeat the Aenir army that is following them. The Farlain defeat another Aenir army by raiding their camp in the night.

=== Chapter 9 ===
Gaelen and Deva are finally reunited with Caswallon and the Farlain. Both the Farlain and the Pallides clan enter through the Gate into a land from thousands of years ago. Caswallon and Maggrig plan an attack on the Aenir, and Caswallon sends Gaelen and his friends to search out the mountains looking for more warriors. Gaelen sets out with Lennox, Layne, Gwalchmai, Agwaine, and two other boys, but Lennox is sent back after they find a baby in the woods. Gaelen's party continues to travel west, but they are attacked by wolves, and Layne is killed.

=== Chapter 10 ===
Caswallon is sent to a future world to seek the Queen and ask her help in fighting the Aenir. However, Taliesen tragically dies after a 1,000 years of life, and the Gates close, so Caswallon cannot come back to his realm.

Gaelen's party find the Haesten party after 5 days of travel, but they are sad to hear that almost all the men have been killed in a final raid against the Aenir. Gaelen speaks with the girl Lara, who tells him that they have 800 women that are willing to fight. Gaelen immediately develops a crush on Lara.

Maggrig, the Pallides Hunt Lord, hears that the Gates have been closed, and is despaired. However, he makes alliances with some minor clans to fight the Aenir.

Caswallon hears that the Gates have been closed, and he is told that in order for him to return to his realm he must study for 11 years to learn how to reopen the Gates. Now with the Haesten women as well as some Pallides stragglers, Gaelen leads the bigger group of warriors to Axta Glen, the planned battle site with the Aenir. Gaelen and Lara fall for each other, and they make out one night.

Meanwhile, Maggrig and his army of Pallides and Farlain make their last stand against the Aenir. While the clansmen fight with vengeance and the arrows make their mark, but the Aenir looked poised for another victory. However, at a crucial time Gaelen arrives with his army, and then the Hawk Queen arrives with her army and horses. With their new-found numbers, the battle turns, and the Aenir are finally defeated.

After the war, Gaelen introduces his new girlfriend to everyone, and the Queen seeks Gaelen. Gaelen and Lara agree to follow the Queen to her realm, because they have little left in their realm. Gwalchmai and Lennox agree to follow Gaelen. Gaelen is very happy to see Caswallon again, but he is confused at why Caswallon looks 10 years older than he did.

=== Chapter 11 ===
Caswallon explains to Gaelen that he studied with a druid for 11 years in order to return to his realm, but how when he came back to his world no time had passed. Caswallon and Maeg reunite, and Gaelen, Lara, Gwalchmai, and Lennox say goodbye to their clansmen and follow the Queen to their new realm.

=== Epilogue ===
Agwaine ruled the Farlain for 27 peaceful years. However, Deva continued to wait for the king she was to marry, but after seven years of waiting, Caswallon revealed to her that Gaelen was the future king she was to marry, and Deva broke down in tears. Deva eventually married a widower and raised children. Lennox and Gwalchmai both led good lives in the Queen's realm, but Gwalchmai was killed in battle. Gaelen and Lara lived contently and had five children, and after the Queen died Gaelen became the new king.

== Characters ==
- Gaelen – orphaned Lowlander child thief. He is smart and suspicious but "life has not been good to him".
- Caswallon – Farlain clansman, Hunt Master, man of impulse: robs for adventure, not liked by many, proud, independent.
- Maeg – Caswallon's wife, interesting but strong relationship with husband.
- Donal – Caswallon and Maeg's baby son.
- Kareen – orphaned caretaker of Maeg and baby Donal.
- Oracle – old druid, takes care of Gaelen, caused the Aenir to come to this world.
- Asbidag – head of the Aenir, his sons are captains of the Aenir army: Tostig, Drada, Ongist.
- Taliesen – druid, can open the Gates of Time.
- Maggrig – Pallides Hunt Lord, Maeg's father.
- Cambil – Farlain Hunt Lord, not on good terms with Caswallon.
- Agwaine – Cambil's son, doesn't like Gaelen.
- Layne – Gaelen's friend, confident.
- Lennox – Gaelen's friend, strong/giant but friendly personality, eats a lot.
- Gwalchmai – Gaelen's friend, shy and smaller, but friendly.
- Beast – has been sent to find and kill Sigarni, the Hawk Queen.
- Hawk Queen – a Queen from a kingdom in the future, travels through the Gates to fight different wars, left her land and time because she was severely wounded.
- Deva – Cambil's daughter, Gaelen's crush.
