= Darkness Unveiled =

Player's guide for a collectible card game

Darkness Unveiled is a book about Vampire: The Eternal Struggle published by Wizards of the Coast.

== Contents ==
Darkness Unveiled is a 200-page hardcover player's guide for Vampire: The Eternal Struggle featuring a cover by Dave McKean and black ribbons to allow the book to be tied closed.

== Reception ==
Andy Butcher reviewed Darkness Unveiled for Arcane magazine, rating it a 9 out of 10 overall. Butcher comments that "Darkness Unveiled is a must for any V:TES player. It's packed full of useful advice, intelligent discussion and handy hints. Apart from the lack of an index there's very little wrong with it. It will give novice and expert players alike a clearer understanding of both how to play and how to win."
