= Waylander (novel) =

Fantasy novel

- First p/b edition
- Author: David Gemmell
- Cover artist: Luis Royo
- Language: English
- Series: Drenai
- Genre: Fantasy
- Publisher: Arrow Books (p/b); Century (h/b)
- Publication date: 28 August 1986
- Publication place: United Kingdom
- Media type: Print (Hardback & Paperback)
- Pages: 320 (first edition, hardback)
- ISBN: 978-0-7126-9414-8 (first edition, hardback)
- OCLC: 16681980
- Preceded by: The King Beyond the Gate
- Followed by: Quest for Lost Heroes

Waylander is a fantasy novel by British writer David Gemmell, published in 1986. It is the first of three Waylander stories, followed by Waylander II: In the Realm of the Wolf and Waylander III: Hero In The Shadows.

== Plot summary ==
The assassin Waylander is doomed to travel the world in search of revenge against those who killed his family. After allying with a priest, a fellow assassin, a young woman and three children in her charge, Waylander gradually redeems himself and tries to save the kingdom that he plummeted into chaos.

== Waylander The Slayer ==
Waylander The Slayer' is the main character of Waylander, Waylander II: In the Realm of the Wolf and Hero in the Shadows. An anti-hero like the Earl of the Bronze in Legend, Waylander appears at first immoral, an assassin with only mercenary motivations, however is revealed through a series of flashbacks to be a tortured soul, once noble, and now seeking redemption for the singular evil act that defined his legend - the regicide of Niallad, a kind-hearted and well-loved Drenai King.
