= Stormrider (novel) =

2002 novel by David Gemmell

- Stormrider book cover
- Author: David Gemmell
- Language: English
- Series: Rigante
- Genre: Fantasy
- Publisher: Orbit Books
- Publication date: 2002
- Publication place: United Kingdom
- Media type: Print (paperback)
- Pages: 601 (paperback)
- ISBN: 0-552-14676-5
- OCLC: 51271685
- Preceded by: Ravenheart

Stormrider is a fantasy novel by British writer David Gemmell, published in 2002. It is the fourth and last novel in the Rigante series.

== Plot ==
In northern part of the land lies the Moidart and the city of Eldacre; further north is the location of the Rigante clans. This is the place that the highlanders have settled remain free.

The Moidart's son, Gaise Macon (known by the Rigante soul name of 'Stormrider') is in the Royalist king's army, and serves loyally. An old prophecy is making him a hunted man by Lord Winterbourne, the leader of the Redeemer Knights, a group of killers. When they were sacking the village of Shelsans, a monk showed him the skull of Cernunnos. A priest prophesied before he was executed that Winterbourne would be killed by the man with the golden eye - who Winterbourne assumes is Macon.

Winterbourne kills the king, takes control of the army, attempts several assassinations on Macon and launches an invasion on the town the Stormrider is deployed at. Macon holds out due to a warning from a traitor of Winterbourne's army, but the woman he loved was killed.

The Moidart's castle at Eldacre is invaded by soldiers of the Pinance who are allied to Winterbourne, and is a longtime rival/ enemy of the Moidart. The Moidart hides in the castle with a few loyal men, kills the Pinancer leaders, and takes control of the Pinance's army. Macon leads the Eldacre Company back to Eldacre, and the Moidart seeks the Rigante's assistance in the coming invasion by Winterbourne. Cernunnos' spirit forces Winterbourne to hand his skull to the Rigante witch-woman, the Dweller, who passes it on to Stormrider.

As Winterbourne's forces close in on Eldacre, a mage in the Moidart's service communicates with Winterbourne, informing him that the skull of Cernunnos is in his possession. Winterbourne moves around the battlefield and comes to Eldacre with a detachment of elite troops. However the loss of the skull has reduced the fighting skills of the Redeemers from their previous levels to a point where they are defeated by the injured Rigante. Winterbourne is stopped as he tries to escape with the skull and discovers that the man with the golden eye was not Macon.

Macon uses the skull, and Cernunnos takes control of him, temporarily giving him god-like powers. He heals and revives both armies. As Cernunnos prepares to destroy mankind, he is stopped by Macon's old friend, Mulgrave, who shoots a golden bullet into his heart. The Moidart is made the new king.

== Behind the scenes ==
It is generally theorized that the early entries in the Rigante series are Gemmell's interpretation of the wars fought by the native Britons against the invading Romans, a point supported by the single landmass and the mountainous northern regions portrayed in the book. The armies of Stone are clearly based on the Roman Legions, even down to the descriptions of their armaments and military formations. Additionally, the Sea Wolves which frequently raid the Keltoi settlements are clearly based on Saxon, Angle, Jute and Viking raiders. The later books in the Rigante series can be seen as broad parallels to the Anglo-Scottish Wars of the sixteenth century and the English Civil War of the seventeenth century. Since Gemmell never put the point to rest, it can be left to the reader's opinion as to what Gemmel was writing a fantasy counterpart of.

The Morrigu is a character carried over from the novels Sword In The Storm and Midnight Falcon. She is depicted as an evil woman who grants men wishes, only to destroy them later. However, in Ravenheart and Stormrider, it is revealed that she is actually someone who loves all life and wants to help the human race.
