= Ross Cowan =

British historian and author

Ross Cowan is a British historian and author specialising in Roman military history.

== Education and career ==
Cowan studied at the University of Glasgow, completing an MA in classical civilisation in 1997 and a PhD in history in 2003. His doctoral thesis was on the Praetorian Guard and Legio II Parthica, entitled Aspects of the Severan Field Army AD 193–238.

Since earning his PhD Cowan has been an independent scholar, writing books on Roman military history for Osprey Publishing, Greenhill Books, Pen & Sword Books and Frontline Books. He is a contributor to Ad Familiares (Journal of the Friends of Classics), Ancient Egypt, Ancient History, Ancient Warfare, Archäologisches Korrespondenzblatt, BMCR, Classics Ireland, Historia, Medieval Warfare, Military History Monthly and Military Illustrated.

Cowan's research focuses on courage, heroism, glory and warrior culture in the Roman military. Cowan has noted his appreciation of heroic fantasy author David Gemmell. Cowan dedicated his 2007 work, For the Glory of Rome, to the memory of Gemmell.

== Publications ==
Books

- For the Glory of Rome: A History of Warriors and Warfare
- Roman Conquests: Italy
- Roman Battle Tactics 109 BC–AD 313
- Roman Legionary 109-58 BC: The Age of Marius, Sulla and Pompey the Great
- Roman Legionary 58 BC–AD 69
- Roman Legionary AD 69-161
- Imperial Roman Legionary AD 161-284
- Roman Legionary AD 284-337: The Age of Diocletian and Constantine the Great
- Milvian Bridge AD 312: Constantine's Battle for Empire and Faith
- Roman Guardsman 62 BC–AD 324

Select Articles

Hoplites

- But Two Swords Never: A Hoplite Armed With a Kopis and a Xiphos?

Arms & armour and military organisation in pre-Roman Italy:

- The Art of the Etruscan Armourer
- An Important Italic Helmet Rediscovered
- The Samnite Pilum
- Gladius Gallicus
- Etruscan and Gallic Pila
- Slings, Pila or Caducei?
- Tales of the Axe
- Weapons of the Early Legions
- Warlords and Warbands. Revised version here.

Battle Tactics

- Later Roman Battle Tactics
- Changing Formations and Specialists: Aspects of Later Roman Battle Tactics

Centurions

- Centurion
- Before Baculus: Some Sullan Centurions
- Lifeless He Fell: The Centurion in the Third and Fourth Centuries AD

Praetorian Guard

- Roman Adventurers
- Grim Guardians: Emperor Claudius and His Praetorians

Roman Britain and the Ninth Legion

- History as it Ought to Have Been
- Pesky Prosopography: Dame and Doctor Know Best?
- The Lost Legion
- The Defeat of Victory: Tacitus on Boudicca's Last Battle

Roman Warriors and Single Combat

- Honourable Scars: An Introduction to Single Combat in Ancient Greece and Rome
- Provocat Per Interpretem: Valerius, the Gaul and the Interpreter
- The Scarlet Cloak: Caesar's Courage and Charisma
- Catiline's Eagle: Patrician Ambition in Late Republican Rome
- Wounds to the Front
- Champions and Tradition: Single Combat in the Age of Belisarius
- Roman Warriors: The Myth of the Military Machine
- Head-Hunting Roman Cavalry

War Cries and Weapons Clashing

- The Clashing of Weapons and Silent Advances in Roman Battles

Later Roman Army

- Dreams and Visions in the Roman Military
- Old Weapons For New Soldiers
- Exploratores: Scouting for the Soldier Emperor
- Sinful Barbarians and Part-Time Legionaries
- Gallienus' Ghost Riders

Various Roman Military

- The Caged Eagle: Angus McBride and the Aquila of Legio II Parthica
- Aimed at Fulvia's Fanny? Examples of Obscene Latin in the First Century BC
- Bernard and Manlius: The Declaration of Arbroath and the Sullan Centurion

Charioteers

- Despised and Idolized: The Lives of Roman Charioteers

Scottish Warfare

- Everyone Loves a Highland Warrior?
- Trophy-Hunters and Torturers
- Lairds of Battle
- Late Medieval Scottish Swords: Strength and Balance From the North
- More Like Lions Than Men

Guitar Heroes

- (Guitar) Heroes Never Die
- Ascending to the Hall of Heroes: The AI Apotheosis of John Sykes

Photography

- A Photo Essay of Sorts: An Ode to the Nikon F65, Ricoh R1 and Olympus Mju
