= The King Beyond the Gate =

1985 novel by David Gemmell

- First edition
- Author: David Gemmell
- Language: English
- Series: Drenai series
- Genre: Fantasy
- Publisher: Century
- Publication date: 1985
- Publication place: United Kingdom
- Media type: Print (Paperback & Hardback)
- Pages: 415 (first edition, paperback)
- ISBN: 978-0-7126-0872-5
- Preceded by: Legend
- Followed by: Waylander

The King Beyond The Gate is a fantasy novel by British writer David Gemmell. It was published in 1985. It was the second book published by Gemmell, after Legend, published a year earlier. The book is set in the same fictional world as Legend, that of the Drenai, but is not a sequel in the usual sense as the events of the two books take place around a century apart. Thus the main protagonists of Legend are long since dead and play little part in The King Beyond the Gate, other than passing mentions. This set a precedent for the entire Drenai series, in which very few characters appear in more than one novel, the gaps between novels sometimes running to centuries, giving a more epic, historical flavour to the series.

== Synopsis ==
The King Beyond the Gate takes place a century after Legend: Druss The Legend is gone, the Earl of Bronze is a legend himself. The Drenai are now under the rule of Ceska, an usurper of the throne who over time has become an emperor. Ceska rules with an iron fist, with the Joinings and the Dark Templars as his tools of terror. The Joinings are werebeasts, made by the merging of man and animal, an ancient machine of the old times making the merging of two species possible, one alone becomes an army itself. The Dark Templars are priests of darkness, with power beyond that of normal men. Tenaka Khan and his companions must forge alliances and unlikely friendships to overcome a time of horror and turmoil.

== Issues ==
Following on from other Gemmell works where the main characters are powerful men past their prime, the three characters of Tenaka, Ananaïs and Decado are all three less able to rely on physical endurance and dumb luck, and instead use experience and bluff to survive. This story also offers a much grittier view of the Drenai world compared to Legend. The “Joinings” are new to the saga, melding of animals and men (and women).
