= White Wolf Campground =

Campground outside of Yosemite Valley

Coordinates: 37°52′14.44″N 119°38′49.52″W

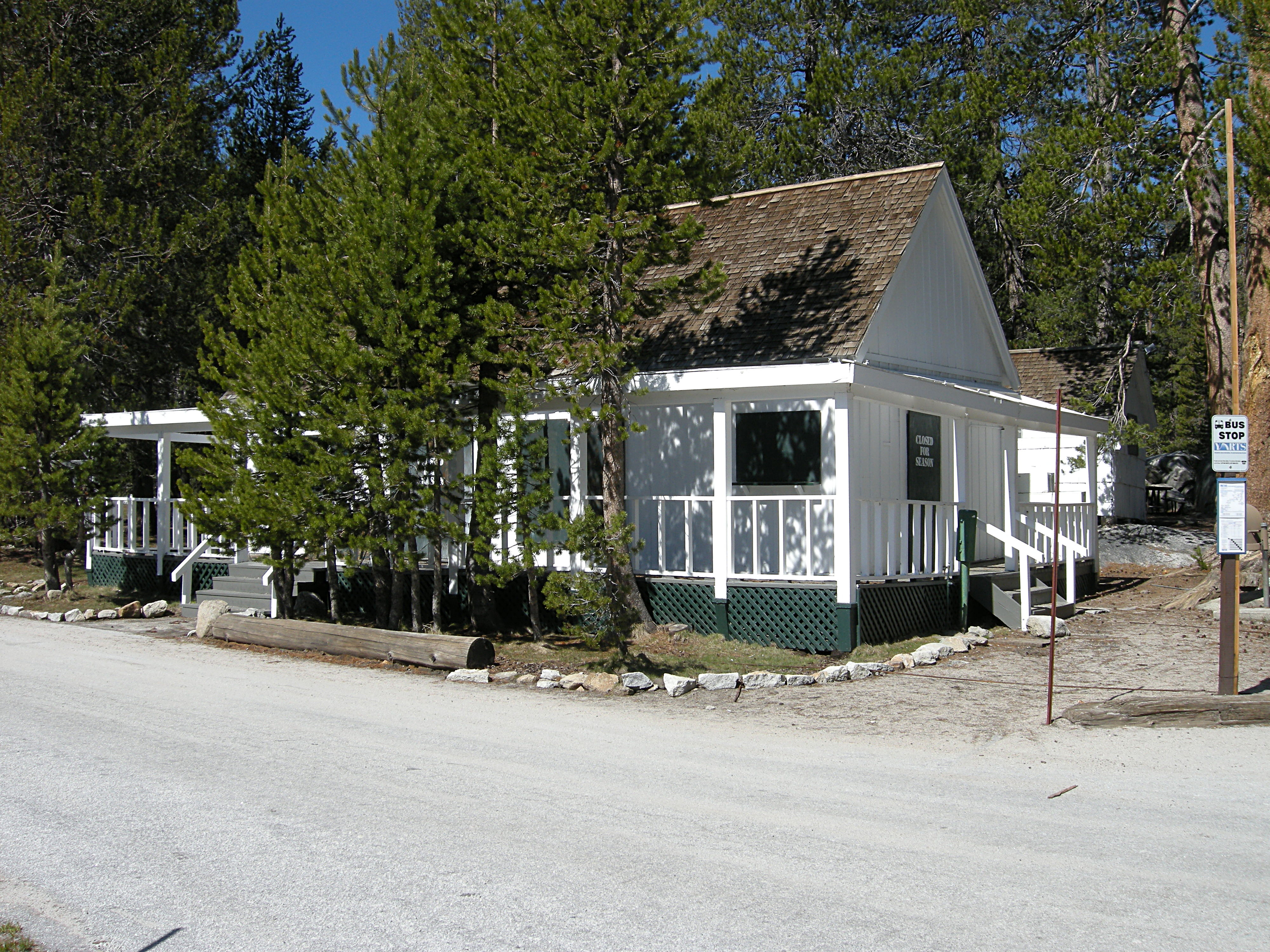
Cafe and store at White Wolf

White Wolf Campground is a camping and concession area in the northern part of Yosemite National Park along Tioga Road (Highway 120). It contains 74 campsites, a cluster of wood-and-canvas cabins, a small restaurant, and a general store.

Settlement in the White Wolf area by Europeans began in the early 20th century, after the construction of the Tioga Road. The first structures were likely shelters for ranch hands, and by 1930 the area was home to a small resort which included tents, tourist cabins, a small store and restaurant, and a gas station. After a drop in tourism following World War II and the relocation of the highway, the land was purchased by the government, with concession rights held by the Yosemite Park and Curry Co. The public campground was improved in 1960-1961.

Sources differ on the origin of the name. According to one story, cattlemen pursuing horse thieves in 1850 came upon an encampment of Indians led by a tribal chief whose name was White Wolf, and named the place after him. Another story is that it was named by a sheepherder who saw a white wolf in the area.
