= Quest for Lost Heroes =

1990 novel by David Gemmell

- First edition (h/b)
- Author: David Gemmell
- Cover artist: Roger Garland
- Language: English
- Series: Drenai series
- Genre: Fantasy
- Publisher: Legend Books
- Publication date: 12 April 1990
- Publication place: United Kingdom
- Media type: Print (Paperback & Hardback)
- Pages: 316 (paperback)
- ISBN: 0-09-964340-5 (paperback) 0712625127 (hardcover)
- Preceded by: Waylander
- Followed by: Waylander II: In the Realm of the Wolf

Quest for Lost Heroes, published in 1990, is a novel by British fantasy writer David Gemmell. It is the fourth entry in the Drenai series. The story is set several decades after and makes several references to the events in Gemmell's earlier title, The King Beyond the Gate. It also provides a conclusion to the story of Tenaka Khan, one of the main protagonists of The King Beyond the Gate.

== Summary ==
The Drenai Empire no longer exists: Tenaka Khan's Nadirs have invaded the entire continent. Only the small kingdom of Gothir has resisted the invaders, thanks to the heroes of the Battle of Bel-Azar.

These heroes of the past include Charéos, a fine duelist entrenched in a monastery in the service of the Count of Talgithir, Beltzer, a peasant who turned out to be a fierce warrior with an axe, and two others, Finn and Maggrig, renowned archers.

These former heroes will be drawn into the quest of Kiall, a young villager from the kingdom of Gothir, who has vowed to rescue Ravenna, another villager captured by slavers with whom he believes he is in love.

Young Kiall soon discovers the gap between the glorious songs about heroes and reality.
