= Catherine Cookson =

British novelist (1906–1998)

Dame Catherine Cookson DBE
- Born: Catherine Ann McMullen; 20 June 1906; South Shields, England
- Died: 11 June 1998 (aged 91); Newcastle upon Tyne, England
- Occupation: Novelist
- Spouse: Tom Cookson (m. 1940)
- Writing career
- Pen name: Catherine Cookson; Catherine Marchant; Katie McMullen
- Period: 1950–1998

Dame Catherine Ann Cookson (née McMullen; 20 June 1906 – 11 June 1998) was a British writer. It has been estimated that, as of 2003, over 100 million copies of her books have been sold worldwide while she retained a relatively low profile in the world of celebrity writers. Her books were inspired by her deprived youth in South Shields (historically part of County Durham), North East England, the setting for her novels. With 104 titles written in her own name or two other pen names, she is one of the most prolific British novelists.

== Early life ==
Cookson, registered as Catherine Ann Davies, was born on 20 June 1906 at 5 Leam Lane in Tyne Dock, South Shields, County Durham, England. She was known as "Katie" as a child. She moved to East Jarrow, which would become the setting for one of her best-known novels, The Fifteen Streets. The illegitimate child of an alcoholic named Kate Fawcett, she grew up thinking her unmarried mother was her sister, as she was brought up by her grandparents, Rose and John McMullen. Biographer Kathleen Jones tracked down her father, whose name was Alexander Davies, a bigamist and gambler from Lanarkshire, Scotland.

She left school at 14 and, after a period of domestic service, took a laundry job at Harton Workhouse in South Shields. In 1929, she moved south to run the laundry at Hastings Workhouse, saving every penny to buy a large Victorian house, and then taking in lodgers to supplement her income.

In June 1940, at the age of 34, she married Tom Cookson, a teacher at Hastings Grammar School. After experiencing four miscarriages late in pregnancy, it was discovered she was suffering from a rare vascular disease, telangiectasia, which caused bleeding from the nose, fingers, and stomach and resulted in anaemia. A mental breakdown followed the miscarriages, from which it took her a decade to recover.

== Writing career ==
She took up writing as a form of therapy in order to tackle her depression, and she became a founding member of the Hastings Writers' Group. Her first novel, Kate Hannigan, was published in 1950. Though it was labelled a romance novel, she expressed discontent with the stereotype. Her books were, she said, historical novels about people and conditions she knew. Cookson had little connection with the London literary circle.

Cookson wrote almost 100 books, which sold more than 123 million copies, her novels being translated into at least 20 languages. She also wrote books under the pseudonym Catherine Marchant and under her childhood name of Katie McMullen. For seventeen years, until four years after her death, she was the author with the largest number of books borrowed from public libraries in the United Kingdom, losing the top spot to Dame Jacqueline Wilson only in 2002.

== Books in film, on television and on stage ==
Many of Cookson's novels have been adapted for film, radio, and the stage. The first film adaptation of her work was Jacqueline (1956), directed by Roy Ward Baker, based on her book A Grand Man. It was followed by Rooney (1958), directed by George Pollock, based on her book Rooney. Both films starred John Gregson. For commercial reasons, the action of both films was transferred from South Shields to Ireland.

In 1983 Katie Mulholland was adapted into a stage musical by composer Eric Boswell and writer-director Ken Hill. Cookson attended the première.

It was on television, however, that she had her greatest media success, with a series of dramas that appeared over the course of a decade on ITV and achieved huge ratings. Eighteen books were adapted for television between 1989 and 2001. They were all produced by Ray Marshall from Festival Film & TV who was given permission by Cookson in 1988 to bring her works to the screen. The first film to be made, The Fifteen Streets starring Sean Bean and Owen Teale, was nominated for an Emmy award in 1990. The second production, The Black Velvet Gown, won an International Emmy for Best Drama in 1991. The mini series regularly attracted over 10 million audiences and are still showing in the UK on Drama and the Yesterday Channel.

== Philanthropy ==
In 1985, Cookson pledged more than £800,000 to the University of Newcastle. In gratitude, the university set up a lectureship in hematology. Some £40,000 was given to provide a laser to help treat bleeding disorders and £50,000 went to create a new post in ear, nose, and throat studies, with particular reference to the detection of deafness in children. She had already given £20,000 towards the university's Hatton Gallery and £32,000 to its library. In recognition of this generosity, a building in the university medical faculty has been named after her. Her foundation continues to make donations to worthy causes in the UK, particularly those offering services to young people and cultural ventures, such as the Tyneside Cinema.

== Honours ==
She was created an Officer of the Order of the British Empire in 1985, and was elevated to Dame Commander of the Order of the British Empire in 1993.

Cookson received the Freedom of the Borough of South Tyneside, and an honorary degree from the University of Newcastle. The Variety Club of Great Britain named her Writer of the Year, and she was voted Personality of the North East.

She was the subject of This Is Your Life in 1982 when she was surprised by Eamonn Andrews.

Cookson was awarded an honorary fellowship at St Hilda's College, Oxford in 1997 after donating £100,000 to the college, although she was too ill to travel to receive it.

== Later life and death ==
In later life, Cookson and her husband, Tom, returned to the North East and settled first in Haldane Terrace, Jesmond, Newcastle upon Tyne. They then moved to Corbridge, a market town near Newcastle, and later to Langley, Northumberland, a small village nearby. As her health declined, they moved for a final time, back to Jesmond in 1989 to be nearer to medical facilities. For the last few years of her life she was bed-ridden, and she gave her final TV interview to North East Tonight, the regional ITV Tyne Tees news programme, from her sickbed. It was conducted by Mike Neville.

Cookson died at the age of 91, nine days before her 92nd birthday, at her home in Newcastle. Her novels, many written from her sickbed, continued to be published posthumously until 2002. Her husband Tom died just 17 days later, on 28 June 1998. He had been hospitalised for a week and the cause of his death was not announced. He was 86 years old. The couple were married for 50 years.

== Legacy ==
In 1992, the inaugural Catherine Cookson Prize took place and was won by author Val Wood and her debut novel, The Hungry Tide, which subsequently went on to become a best-seller.

In March 2008, the Dame Catherine Cookson Memorial Garden was unveiled in the grounds of South Tyneside District Hospital in South Shields, based on the theme of a serpentine symbol, commonly used to symbolise health and caring. The hospital occupies the site of the Harton Workhouse, where Cookson worked from 1924 to 1929. The project was partly funded by the Catherine Cookson Trust.

Tom and Catherine, a musical about the couple's life, was written by local playwright Tom Kelly and opened in 1999. It played to sell-out crowds at the Customs House in South Shields.

=== Portrayals in fiction ===
Cookson was portrayed by actress Kerry Browne in the 2018 award-winning film Our Catherine, co-written by Tom Kelly.

== Bibliography ==
=== Written as Catherine Cookson ===
- The Fifteen Streets (1952)
- Colour Blind (1953)
- Maggie Rowan (1954)
- Rooney (1957)
- The Menagerie (1958)
- Fanny McBride (1959)
- Fenwick Houses (1960)
- The Garment (1962)
- The Blind Miller (1963)
- The Wingless Bird (1964) aka A Marriage of Scandal
- Hannah Massey (1964)
- The Mists of Memory (1965)
- The Long Corridor (1965)
- Matty Doolin (1965)
- The Unbaited Trap (1966)
- Slinky Jane (1967)
- Katie Mulholland (1967)
- The Round Tower (1968)
- The Nice Bloke (1969) aka The Husband (1969)
- The Glass Virgin (1969)
- The Invitation (1970)
- The Dwelling Place (1971)
- Feathers in the Fire (1971) aka Her Secret Son
- Pure as the Lily (1972)
- The Invisible Cord (1975)
- The Gambling Man (1975)
- The Tide of Life (1976)
- The Girl (1977)
- The Cinder Path (1978)
- The Man Who Cried (1979)
- The Whip (1983) aka The Spaniard's Gift (1989)
- The Black Velvet Gown (1984)
- The Bannaman Legacy (1985) aka A Dinner of Herbs (1985)
- The Moth (1986) a.k.a. The Thorman Inheritance (1989)
- The Parson's Daughter (1987)
- The Harrogate Secret (1988) aka The Secret aka The Smuggler's Secret
- The Cultured Handmaiden (1988)
- The Spaniard's Gift (1989) aka The Whip (1983)
- The Black Candle (1989)
- The Thorman Inheritance (1989) aka The Moth (1986)
- The Gillyvors (1990) aka The Love Child (1991)
- My Beloved Son (1991)
- The Rag Nymph (1991) aka The Forester Girl (1993) aka The Rag Maid (2017)
- The House of Women (1992)
- The Maltese Angel (1992)
- The Golden Straw (1993) aka The Hatmaker's Gift
- The Forester Girl (1993) aka The Rag Nymph (1991)
- The Year of the Virgins (1993)
- The Tinker's Girl (1994)
- Justice Is a Woman (1994)
- A Ruthless Need (1995)
- The Bonny Dawn (1996)
- The Branded Man (1996) aka The Wayward Daughter (2022)
- The Lady on my Left (1997) aka The Mists of Memory (1965)
- The Obsession (1995)
- The Upstart (1998)
- The Blind Years (1998)
- Riley (1998)
- Solace of Sin (1998)
- The Desert Crop (1999) aka An Unsuitable Match
- The Thursday Friend (1999)
- My Land of the North (1999)
- A House Divided (2000)
- Rosie of the River (2000)
- The Simple Soul and Other Stories (2001)
- The Silent Lady (2002)

==== The Kate Hannigan series ====
- Kate Hannigan (1950)
- Kate Hannigan's Girl (2001)

==== The Mary Ann stories ====
- A Grand Man (1954)
- The Lord and Mary Ann (1956)
- The Devil and Mary Ann (1958)
- Love and Mary Ann (1961)
- Life and Mary Ann (1962)
- Marriage and Mary Ann (1964)
- Mary Ann's Angels (1965)
- Mary Ann and Bill (1967)

==== The Mallen Novels ====
- The Mallen Streak (1973)
- The Mallen Girl (1974)
- The Mallen Litter (1974)

==== The Tilly Trotter trilogy ====
- Tilly Trotter aka Tilly (1980)
- Tilly Trotter Wed aka Tilly Wed (1981)
- Tilly Trotter Widowed aka Tilly Alone (1982)

==== The Hamilton series ====
- Hamilton (1983)
- Goodbye Hamilton (1984)
- Harold (1985)

==== The Bill Bailey trilogy ====
- Bill Bailey (1986)
- Bill Bailey's Lot (1987) aka Bill Bailey's Litter
- Bill Bailey's Daughter (1988)
- The Bondage of Love (1997)

==== Children's stories ====
- Joe and the Gladiator (1968)
- The Nipper (1970)
- Blue Baccy (1972) aka Rory's Fortune (1988)
- Our John Willie (1974)
- Mrs Flannagan's Trumpet (1976)
- Go Tell It to Mrs Golightly (1977)
- Lanky Jones (1981)
- Nancy Nutall and the Mongrel (1982)
- Rory's Fortune (1988) aka Blue Baccy (1972)
- Bill and The Mary Ann Shaughnessy (1991)

==== Autobiographies ====
- Our Kate (1969)
- Catherine Cookson Country (1986) aka My Land of the North (1999)
- Let Me Make Myself Plain (1988)
- Plainer Still (1995)
- Just A Saying (2002)

=== Written as Catherine Marchant ===
- Heritage of Folly (1961) aka Heritage of Folly (1961) by Katie McMullen
- The Fen Tiger (1963) aka The House on the Fens (1963)
- House of Men (1963)
- The Mists of Memory (1965) aka The Lady on my Left (1997) by Catherine Cookson
- The Iron Facade (1965) aka Evil at Rodgers Cross (1965)
- Miss Martha Mary Crawford (1975)
- The Slow Awakening (1976)

=== Written as Katie McMullen ===
- Heritage of Folly by Catherine Marchant

== Biographies ==
- To Be a Lady: Biography of Catherine Cookson by Cliff Goodwin (1994)
- The Girl From Leam Lane: The Life and Writing of Catherine Cookson by Piers Dudgeon (1997)
- Catherine Cookson by Kathleen Jones (1999)
- Kate's Daughter: The Real Catherine Cookson by Piers Dudgeon (2003)
- Seeking Catherine Cookson's Da by Kathleen Jones (2004)

== Documentary ==
- The Storyteller (1999) narrated by Mike Neville, and released on DVD in the UK and Australia.

== Books in film and television ==
Only Jaqueline and Rooney are theatrically released films; all others are TV movies or miniseries. Rooney has been released on DVD in the UK by Strawberry Media, while all others from The Mallens miniseries onwards have been released on DVD in the US, UK and Australia.

- Jacqueline (1956) adaptation of A Grand Man with John Gregson, Kathleen Ryan, Noel Purcell and Cyril Cusack
- Rooney (1958) with John Gregson, Muriel Pavlow, Barry Fitzgerald and June Thorburn
- Joe and the Gladiator (1971) with James Garbutt, Malcolm Terris and John Cazabon
- Romance: House of Men (1977) with Michael Kitchen, James Laurenson, Alun Armstrong and Joe Gladwin
- Our John Willie (1980) with Ian Cullen, David Burke, James Garbutt, John Malcolm and Malcolm Terris
- The Mallens (1979–1980) with John Hallam, John Duttine, David Rintoul and Juliet Stevenson
- The Fifteen Streets (1989) with Sean Bean, Owen Teale, Clare Holman and Jane Horrocks
- The Black Candle (1991) with Nathaniel Parker and Samantha Bond
- The Black Velvet Gown (1991) with Janet McTeer, Bob Peck, Geraldine Somerville won the International Emmy award for best drama.
- The Man Who Cried (1993) with Ciaran Hinds, Amanda Root, Daniel Massey and Gemma Craven
- The Cinder Path (1994) with Catherine Zeta-Jones
- The Dwelling Place (1994) with Tracy Whitwell, Julie Hesmondhalgh and Ray Stevenson
- The Glass Virgin (1995) with Nigel Havers, Emily Mortimer and Brendan Coyle
- The Gambling Man (1995) with Robson Green
- The Tide of Life (1996) with Gillian Kearney, John Bowler, Ray Stevenson and James Purefoy
- The Girl (1996) with Jonathan Cake, Malcolm Stoddard, Jill Baker and Siobhan Flynn
- The Wingless Bird (1997) with Claire Skinner, Anne Reid and Julian Wadham
- The Moth (1997) with Jack Davenport, Juliet Aubrey and Justine Waddell
- The Rag Nymph (1997) with Honeysuckle Weeks, Alec Newman, Crispin Bonham-Carter and Val McLane
- The Round Tower (1998) with Emilia Fox, Ben Miles and Denis Lawson
- Colour Blind (1998) with Niamh Cusack, Tony Armatrading, Art Malik, Dearbhla Molloy, and Carmen Ejogo
- Tilly Trotter (1999) with Carli Norris, Beth Goddard, Sarah Alexander, Amelia Bullmore, Rosemary Leach and Simon Shepherd
- The Secret (2000) with Colin Buchanan, Hannah Yelland, Elizabeth Carling, Clare Higgins, and Stephen Moyer
- A Dinner of Herbs (2000) with Jonathan Kerrigan, Melanie Clark Pullen, Debra Stephenson, David Threlfall and Billie Whitelaw
