= Legio X Equestris =

Roman legion

Tenth Legion Equestris
- Legio X Equestris; Legio Decima Equestris
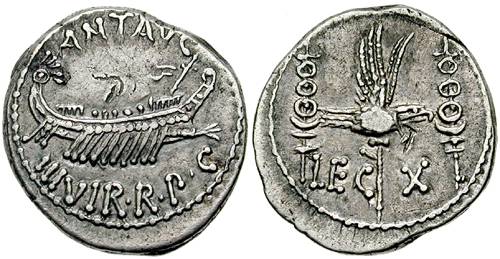
- Denarius issued by Mark Antony celebrating Legio X
- Active: 1st half of the first century BC to after 31 BC
- Country: Roman Republic
- Type: Roman legion (Marian)
- Size: Varied over unit lifetime. Approx. 5,000 soldiers, 6,000 men including support, at the time of creation.
- Nicknames: Equestris, "mounted" Veneria, "devoted to Venus"
- Mascot: Bull
- Engagements: Gallic Wars (58–51 BC); Battle against the Nervians (57 BC); Battle against Ariovistus (58 BC); First invasion of Britain (55 BC); Battle of Gergovia (52 BC); Battle of Alesia (52 BC); Caesar's Civil War; Battle of Ilerda (49 BC); Battle of Dyrrhachium (48 BC); Battle of Pharsalus (48 BC); Battle of Thapsus (46 BC); Battle of Munda (45 BC); Battle of Philippi (42 BC); Antony's Parthian War; Final War of the Roman Republic; Battle of Actium (31 BC)

Commanders
- Notable commanders: Julius Caesar (Campaign); Mark Antony (Campaign); Gaius Crastinus (Centurion)

Legio X Equestris, a Roman legion, was one of the most trusted legions of Julius Caesar. Legio X was famous in its day and throughout history, because of its portrayal in Caesar's Commentaries and the prominent role the Tenth played in his Gallic campaigns. Its soldiers were discharged in 45 BC. Its remnants were reconstituted, fought for Mark Antony and Octavian, disbanded, and later merged into X Gemina.

== History ==
=== Founding ===
The Legio X was one of the four legions Caesar inherited as governor of Cisalpine Gaul in 58 BC. The legion had as its emblem the bull, which was also popular with other legions such as Legio V Alaudae (Larks), Legio XI, Legio XII Fulminata, and Legio XIII Gemina. It may have been levied in 72 BC. Others believe it was formed already during the Social War (91-87 BC). Another hypothesis is that it was levied in 61 BC by Gaius Julius Caesar when he, as Governor in the province of Baetica or Hispania Ulterior (modern Andalusia), decided to subdue the west and northwest areas (modern day Portugal); according to this theory, Caesar needed for his planned campaign a third legion (in addition to the 8th and 9th legions, which had been enlisted by Pompey the Great in 65 BC) and enlisted the 10th legion, which proved successful and showed itself to be brave and loyal.

=== Gallic Wars and the invasion of Britain ===
The Tenth played a crucial part in the Gallic Wars, fighting under Caesar in virtually every battle.

At the beginning of the Gallic campaign, Caesar had the 10th, 7th, 8th, and 9th legions. Almost immediately, in the summer of 58 BC, the legion fought in two major actions, the battles of Arar and Bibracte. They played a central part in Caesar's defeat of the Helvetii tribes, preventing their migration from present day Switzerland to western France.

Following the defeat of the Helvetii, the leaders of the Gallic tribes petitioned Caesar for his aid against Ariovistus, king of the German Suebi tribe. Prior to battle, Ariovistus suggested a peace conference but insisted that each side should only be accompanied by mounted troops. Ariovistus made this a condition knowing that Caesar's cavalry was composed mainly of Aedui horsemen whose loyalty to Caesar was questionable. Caesar ordered a group of his Gallic auxiliaries to dismount and had legionaries from the 10th ride in their place to accompany him to the peace conference. This incident earned the legion its nickname Equestris (mounted). One of the legionaries jokingly said that Caesar was better than his word: he had promised to make them foot guards, but now they appeared as equestrians.

Legio X saved the day in the Battle against the Nervians in 57 BC. Together with the IXth, the Xth defeated the Atrebates, moved against the Belgae on the other side of the river and captured the enemy camp. From that position, the Tenth could see how desperate the situation was for the XII Fulminata and the VII, so it quickly charged downhill, crossed the river, and attacked the Nervii from the rear, trapping them so that there was little hope of survival.

In 55 BC Legio X was one of the two legions (together with the VII) which took part in Caesar's first invasion of Britain. It is probable that it also participated in the second invasion in 54 BC.

=== Caesar's Civil War ===
During Caesar's Civil War, at the Battle of Dyrrhachium, Caesar feared Legio X would be outflanked by reinforcements led by Gnaeus Pompeius Magnus and ordered them to retreat. The rest of Caesar's army, seeing Legio X retreating for the first time, broke and fled to their camps. Legio X, seeing the army rout, fled too. After the defeat, Legio X's officers demanded to be decimated for cowardice but Caesar was reluctant and demoted Legio X's standard bearers instead.

Legio X only had one more battle to restore their reputation before they returned to Rome and mutinied for being unpaid.

=== End of the legion ===
In 45 BC the legion was disbanded, and the veterans obtained lands in Narbonne, southern Gaul.

During the civil war that followed Caesar's assassination, the Legio X was reconstituted by Lepidus (winter 44/43), and fought for the triumvirs until the final Battle of Philippi. The veterans obtained lands near Cremona, and an inscription reports that the name of the legion at the time was Veneria, "devoted to Venus", the mythical mother of gens Julia.

The Tenth later followed Mark Antony in Armenia, during his disastrous Parthian campaign. During Antony's civil war, the legion fought for Mark Antony until the defeat in the Battle of Actium, after which the legion moved into Octavian's army. The veterans settled in Patras. When the legion rebelled under Augustus, it was disbanded, stripped of its Equestris title, and, being populated with soldiers from other legions, renamed X Gemina.

== See also ==
- List of Roman legions
