= The Last Guardian (novel) =

1989 novel by David Gemmell

- First edition cover
- Author: David Gemmell
- Cover artist: Roger Garland
- Language: English
- Series: Jon Shannow
- Genre: Post-apocalyptic fiction; Heroic fantasy
- Set in: Plague Lands
- Publisher: Legend Books
- Publication date: November 1989
- Publication place: United Kingdom
- Pages: 279
- ISBN: 978-0-7126-2522-7
- Preceded by: Wolf in Shadow
- Followed by: Bloodstone

The Last Guardian is a 1989 British post-apocalyptic heroic fantasy novel written by bestselling British author David Gemmell.

== Setting ==
The Last Guardian is a sequel to Wolf in Shadow, taking place about two years after. The Hellborn are no longer a threat, and all but two of the Guardians are dead. Additionally the largest source of Sipstrassi has been destroyed making the stones much harder to come by. Additional details of the world are also revealed as we learn by the end of the first novel that the city of Atlantis did exist, and sank in the first "fall", the story of which time has been passed on as the story of Noah's ark.

As in Wolf in Shadow, The Last Guardian's magic system is based on Sipstrassi or stones of power, which are golden meteors which allow one to heal oneself, create food, and which are supposedly limited only by one's imagination, although each stone only has a certain amount of power, and as they are used black veins will appear upon the stone and grow, until eventually the Sipstrassi is coal black, and powerless. However by feeding Sipstrassi blood one can refill them, although Sipstrassi refilled in this manner become blood red, incapable of healing or producing feed, good only for combat. Additionally blood Sipstrassi inspire darker feelings such as lust, greed, and rage in their wielders.

== Plot outline ==
Beginning right after the previous novel's conclusion, The Last Guardian starts with Jon Shannow near death on a mountain. The book is set in two different times; in ancient Atlantis eight thousand years ago, and in Jon Shannow's time several hundred years after "The Fall".

The core plot deals with the danger from ancient Atlantis which created a gate in time to Shannow's world, as well as the formation of a new city in the Shannow's post-apocalyptic time.

Like the previous novel the mystical stones (i.e.; stones of power) Sipstrassi once again play a large role, this time as the main way of traveling between times and worlds.

== Main characters ==
Jon Shannow, The Jerusalem Man, regarded as one of the best gunmen in the land, Shannow is now middle-aged and feels himself slowing down. Known as much for his skills as his quest to find the destroyed city of Jerusalem Shannow is regarded as potentially insane, and travels from town to town killing outlaws for money.

Nu-Khasisatra, an outlawed prophet of the god Chronos, from the city of Atlantis 8000 years past.

The Dark Lady, who heals and teaches the beast men.

Beth McAdam, a resourceful recent widow, and mother of two young children migrating across the lorn bandit filled deserts seeking a new home.

== Trilogy ==
This novel is the second book in an unnamed trilogy called either the Jon Shannow trilogy or The Chronicles of The Jerusalem Man.

1. Wolf in Shadow (1987)
2. The Last Guardian (1989)
3. Bloodstone (1994)

In his foreword to The Last Guardian, Gemmell says that he intended Wolf in Shadow to be a standalone novel, but a combination of factors led to him writing The Last Guardian. One was a letter from a reader insisting that Shannon wasn't dead. A second was a negative review by a critic named Broome containing the line, "I dread to think of people who look up to men like Jon Shannow". Gemmell reacted by created the character Josiah Broome, a man who in Gemmell's words was "passionately opposed to violence who would loathe the hero, but be drawn into his world". Gemell's third source of inspiration was a song by Tracy Chapman.

== Critics' responses ==
The website Fantasy books review gave it a rating of 8.5 out of 10 with the comment "even better than Wolf in Shadow".
