= Stormrider (Swedish band) =

Swedish black and death metal band

Stormrider was a Swedish black and death metal band.

The band was founded in Stockholm in 1999.

== Discography and reception ==
In 2003, they managed to release their debut album, First Battle Won. It was recorded in Abyss Studios with Tommy Tägtgren. After initially being issued on Destructive Records, the label had problems, leading to a reissuing on New Aeon Media in 2004. In reviewing the album, Norway's Scream Magazine only gave a 3 out of 6 score. Stormrider "had some way to go before the band can call itself original", and the songs were indistinguishable from the "hoi polloi". Another Norwegian magazine Exact scored the album 4 out of 6, stating the production was good, but that the band needed another pinch of creativity if they were to stand out among the rest. The score was even lower (4 out of 10) from Denmark's Heavymetal.dk, whose reviewer was tired of Swedish death metal bands mixing death and black, having "been heard a billion times before".

Metal.de found the album "certainly worth buying" for death and black metal fans. In addition to skilled production, "the music sounds incredibly catchy and multifaceted" with "equally compelling" material spread throughout the album, but the overall score was 6 out of 10. Vampster called First Battle Won "a solid Swedish blend of black and death metal sounds, even if no true strokes of genius were achieved in the songwriting department. On the plus side, you won't be bothered by pseudo-innovative flourishes or kitschy keyboards…".

Stormrider's second and last album Lucifer Rising came out in 2007.
