= Legend (Gemmell novel) =

Novel by David Gemmell

- First edition
- Author: David Gemmell
- Language: English
- Series: Drenai series
- Genre: Fantasy
- Publisher: Century
- Publication date: April 1984
- Publication place: United Kingdom
- Media type: Print (Paperback & Hardback)
- Pages: 320 (first edition, paperback)
- ISBN: 0-7126-0387-5 (first edition, paperback)
- OCLC: 63092107
- Followed by: The King Beyond the Gate

Legend is a fantasy novel by British writer David Gemmell, published in 1984. It established him as a major fantasy novelist and created the character of Druss, who would appear in several subsequent books. It was the first novel by Gemmell, and in The Drenai saga.

Gemmell got the idea for the book in 1976. He was being tested for cancer, and to take his mind off it he tried writing a book, which he called "Against the Hordes". The fortress and its attackers, the Nadir, were metaphors for him and the cancer. In the end, he was found not to have cancer after all and he forgot about the book, which he claims wasn't very good anyway. However, in 1980, a friend of Gemmell's read the manuscript and told him that the story had potential. Encouraged, Gemmell set to work rewriting the book that would become known as "Legend". It was accepted by Century Publishing late in 1982.

In 1984 Century Software produced a game for the ZX Spectrum computer based on the novel, also called Legend. The novel was included as part of the pack and acted as a form of copy protection for the game.

== Plot ==
The Drenai Empire is under threat. The tribal Nadir people have been united for the first time by the great warleader Ulric, who has forged a massive empire in the North. The Drenai leader Abalayn is trying to negotiate new treaties with Ulric, but war is brewing and an over 500,000 strong Nadir army marches on the fortress of Dros Delnoch, gateway to the Drenai heartlands. Dros Delnoch is the greatest fortress in the world, a narrow pass guarded by six high walls and a great keep, but under Abalayn its complement of defenders has been reduced to less than 10,000 men under the leadership of an unfit General.

The fate of the Drenai hinges on the defence of Dros Delnoch. If the fortress can hold the Nadir horde for three months, the Drenai general Magnus Woundweaver might be able to gather and train a Drenai army. However, given the odds, no-one truly believes that Delnoch can be held.

The novel follows the stories of two men who find their destiny at Dros Delnoch. Regnak Wanderer (Rek for short) an ex-army officer and natural 'baresark', seeing a war brewing, resigned his commission because he lacked the courage to risk his life and took to a life of wandering. Rek is an idealist and eventually he returns to Delnoch at the persuasion of the woman he falls in love with and finds his destiny as the Earl of Bronze. The other man is the greatest hero of the Drenai people - Druss the Legend. His death was foretold defending Delnoch and while given the choice to avoid it and fall into senility Druss (and his once possessed axe Snaga) marched to the great fortress to defend his people one last time. In this story Druss is in his sixties and much weaker than his prime but still a formidable warrior and an inspirational leader to the Drenai. The story also flicks into the perspective of several defenders during different stages of the siege as time goes on. It also follows The Thirty, a group of 30 warrior priests of the light whose purpose is to fight and die (except for one priest that leaves to continue the order at the end of each great battle) for the greater good and their people, the Drenai.

== Druss the Legend ==
Druss the Legend is a hero embodying virtue, courage, honour, chivalry and strength of character. Druss is the grandson of Bardan the Slayer, a psychotic madman driven insane by the demon residing within his rune covered enchanted axe, Snaga the Sender (Druss later exorcised the demon while looking for his wife Rowena). Druss is described as a physically imposing man, immensely strong but also possessing great speed and dexterity. He has a hard, flat face, black hair and a thick, black beard and pale blue eyes. Despite his initial lack of formal combat training, he becomes known as a fearsome warrior who has never been bested in single combat. He wears the armour and weapons of his grandfather, which includes a black leather jerkin with silver steel pauldrons, black leather gauntlets with reinforced steel plates covering the knuckles and forearms, black leather boots and a black pot helmet with a silver axe motif on the brow flanked by small silver skulls. Druss was the main protagonist in Gemmell's first novel, Legend, however chronologically his story begins in The First Chronicles of Druss the Legend and is continued in The Legend of Deathwalker. Having died in Legend, Druss reappears in The Swords of Night and Day, both as a spirit wandering in the darkness, and in physical form by possessing his clone. In October 2000 at the World Fantasy Convention in Texas, David Gemmell gave an interview in which he revealed that Druss was based on his stepfather, Bill. "Years later, when I wrote my first novel, I used Bill as the model for a character. His name was Druss the Legend. Bill re-appeared in many novels thereafter, in many guises."
