= Hero in the Shadows =

2000 novel by David Gemmell

- First edition (UK)
- Author: David Gemmell
- Cover artist: John Bolton
- Language: English
- Series: Drenai
- Genre: Fantasy novel
- Publisher: Bantam Books; Del Rey Books (US)
- Publication date: March 2000
- Publication place: United Kingdom
- Media type: Print (Hardback & Paperback)
- Pages: 406 pp (first edition, hardback)
- ISBN: 978-0-345-43225-4 (first edition, hardback)
- OCLC: 45293718
- Preceded by: Waylander II: In the Realm of the Wolf

Hero in the Shadows, published in 2000, is a novel by British fantasy writer David Gemmell. It is the third of three Waylander stories and was preceded by Waylander II: In the Realm of the Wolf.

== Plot ==
Waylander, the assassin anti-hero of Waylander and Waylander II, is now a rich old man looking for a world that will give him peace and atonement for his crimes. However, his relatively quiet peace is broken by the appearance of old demons from the past, and enemies from the present. Faced with enemies he cannot easily fight, even a magical sorcerer working for an unknown cause, he is forced to take up his crossbow and sabre to once again become Waylander. Aided by an idealistic warrior, a braggart with a stolen sword, a girl with a special talent, and a mysterious priestess and her followers, he seeks to close the chapter of his life by destroying the evil he has created by his own hand.
