= An Unfunny Evening with Tim Minchin and His Piano =

2023–24 concert tour by Tim Minchin

- Tour by Tim Minchin
- Tour poster
- Start date: 4 June 2023
- End date: 26 August 2024
- Legs: 3
- No. of shows: 84

Tim Minchin concert chronology
- Back Tour (2019–2022); An Unfunny Evening with Tim Minchin and His Piano (2023–2024); Songs The World Will Never Hear Tour (2025)

An Unfunny Evening with Tim Minchin and His Piano was a solo concert tour by Australian musician Tim Minchin.

== Background ==
On 21 May 2023, whilst in London working on the revival of Groundhog Day at The Old Vic, Minchin announced that he would perform an initial intimate solo concert at the Lyric Theatre, London on 4 June 2023 which would not feature his previous comedy songs, but a fluid setlist of such as from his album Apart Together, musicals such as Matilda and Groundhog Day, his TV and film projects such as Upright and from his early song-writing days. Due to the popular demand, further concerts were announced at the Lyric, and across the UK and Ireland. On 31 July 2023, it was announced that from October 2023 further concerts would be performed in Australia. In June 2024, it was announced that Minchin would tour the US and Canada in August.

== Set List ==
As part of the 'informal' vibe, the set list and order is changed nightly. Songs throughout previous dates have included;

- Beauty
- If This Plane Goes Down
- Understand it
- You Grew On Me
- Drowned (from Two Fists, One Heart)
- Leaving LA
- Apart Together
- Airport Piano
- Lucy
- So Much Love (from Somewhere...The Magical Musical of Penrith)
- Quiet (from Matilda)
- The Fence
- I Can't Save You
- Still Holding My Hand (from Matilda)
- Tough Hide (from Larrikins)
- Playing Nancy (from Groundhog Day)
- The Song of the Masochist
- I'll Take Lonely Tonight
- The Aeroplane (from Upright)
- Carry You (from Upright)
- Not Perfect
- Dark Side
- Play It Safe
- Feel Like Going Home (The Notting Hillbillies cover)
- Hallelujah (Leonard Cohen cover)
- When I Grow Up (from Matilda)
- White Wine in the Sun

== Tour dates ==
Date	City	Country	Venue
United Kingdom and Ireland
4 June 2023	London	England	Lyric Theatre
6 June 2023	Cardiff	Wales	New Theatre
7 June 2023	Guildford	England	G Live
11 June 2023	London	England	Lyric Theatre
14 June 2023	Brighton	England	Theatre Royal
15 June 2023	Nottingham	England	Playhouse
20 June 2023	York	England	Grand Opera House
21 June 2023	Canterbury	England	Marlowe Theatre
22 June 2023	High Wycombe	England	Swan
19 July 2023	Dublin	Ireland	Vicar Street
20 July 2023	Dublin	Ireland	Vicar Street
23 July 2023	London	England	Lyric Theatre
24 July 2023	Birmingham	England	The Alexandra
26 July 2023	Glasgow	Scotland	Theatre Royal
27 July 2023	Edinburgh	Scotland	Queen's Hall
28 July 2023	Edinburgh	Scotland	Queen's Hall
Australia and New Zealand
12 October 2023	Melbourne	Australia	Comedy Theatre
13 October 2023	Melbourne	Australia	Comedy Theatre
14 October 2023	Melbourne	Australia	Comedy Theatre
15 October 2023	Melbourne	Australia	Comedy Theatre
19 October 2023	Melbourne	Australia	Comedy Theatre
20 October 2023	Melbourne	Australia	Comedy Theatre
21 October 2023	Melbourne	Australia	Comedy Theatre
22 October 2023	Melbourne	Australia	Comedy Theatre
26 October 2023	Melbourne	Australia	Comedy Theatre
27 October 2023	Melbourne	Australia	Comedy Theatre
28 October 2023	Melbourne	Australia	Comedy Theatre
29 October 2023	Melbourne	Australia	Comedy Theatre
10 November 2023	Sydney	Australia	State Theatre
11 November 2023	Sydney	Australia	State Theatre
12 November 2023	Sydney	Australia	State Theatre
17 November 2023	Hobart	Australia	Odeon Theatre
18 November 2023	Hobart	Australia	Odeon Theatre
19 November 2023	Hobart	Australia	Odeon Theatre
20 November 2023	Hobart	Australia	Odeon Theatre
4 December 2023	Canberra	Australia	Llewellyn Hall
5 December 2023	Canberra	Australia	Llewellyn Hall
6 December 2023	Canberra	Australia	Llewellyn Hall
19 January 2024	Geelong	Australia	Costa Hall
20 January 2024	Geelong	Australia	Costa Hall
27 January 2024	Brisbane	Australia	Queensland Performing Arts Centre
28 January 2024	Brisbane	Australia	Queensland Performing Arts Centre
29 January 2024	Brisbane	Australia	Queensland Performing Arts Centre
2 February 2024	Brisbane	Australia	Queensland Performing Arts Centre
3 February 2024	Brisbane	Australia	Queensland Performing Arts Centre
8 February 2024	Adelaide	Australia	Her Majesty's Theatre
9 February 2024	Adelaide	Australia	Her Majesty's Theatre
10 February 2024	Adelaide	Australia	Her Majesty's Theatre
11 February 2024	Adelaide	Australia	Her Majesty's Theatre
18 February 2024	Newcastle	Australia	Civic Theatre
19 February 2024	Newcastle	Australia	Civic Theatre
22 February 2024	Perth	Australia	Regal Theatre
23 February 2024	Perth	Australia	Regal Theatre
24 February 2024	Perth	Australia	Regal Theatre
25 February 2024	Perth	Australia	Regal Theatre
29 February 2024	Perth	Australia	Regal Theatre
1 March 2024	Perth	Australia	Regal Theatre
2 March 2024	Perth	Australia	Regal Theatre
3 March 2024	Perth	Australia	Regal Theatre
7 March 2024	Wellington	New Zealand	St. James Theatre
8 March 2024	Wellington	New Zealand	St. James Theatre
9 March 2024	Wellington	New Zealand	St. James Theatre
15 March 2024	Gold Coast	Australia	The Star
20 March 2024	Auckland	New Zealand	Auckland Town Hall
21 March 2024	Auckland	New Zealand	Auckland Town Hall
22 March 2024	Auckland	New Zealand	Auckland Town Hall
24 March 2024	Christchurch	New Zealand	Isaac Theatre Royal
25 March 2024	Christchurch	New Zealand	Isaac Theatre Royal
11 April 2024	Sydney	Australia	Enmore Theatre
12 April 2024	Sydney	Australia	Enmore Theatre
USA and Canada
3 August 2024	Vancouver	Canada	Queen Elizabeth Theatre
6 August 2024	Portland	United States	Newmark Theatre
7 August 2024	Seattle	United States	Moore Theatre
9 August 2024	San Francisco	United States	Masonic Auditorium
10 August 2024	Los Angeles	United States	Orpheum Theatre
13 August 2024	Denver	United States	Paramount Theatre
15 August 2024	Austin	United States	ACL Live at The Moody Theater
16 August 2024	Dallas	United States	Majestic Theatre
20 August 2024	Toronto	Canada	Massey Hall
21 August 2024	Minnesota	United States	State Theatre
23 August 2024	Boston	United States	Boch Center Shubert Theatre
24 August 2024	Washington, D.C.	United States	Warner Theatre
25 August 2024	New York City	United States	The Town Hall
26 August 2024	New York City	United States	The Town Hall
