= Nicholas Brown (actor) =

Australian actor and singer

- Born: 1 January 1980 (age 46); Sydney, Australia
- Other name: Nick Brown
- Occupations: Actor, screenwriter, playwright, singer and songwriter
- Years active: Since 1994

Nicholas Brown (born 1 January 1980) is an Australian actor, screenwriter, playwright, singer and songwriter.

== Early life ==
Brown grew up in the Western Sydney suburb of Greystanes with parents Roy and Patricia Brown and older sister Tracey. He attended Newtown High School of the Performing Arts in years 11 and 12. Whilst at NHSPA he represented the school in various drama and music festivals including OnStage and was elected School Captain in 1997.

In 1998, Brown was accepted into the Australian drama school the National Institute of Dramatic Art and was said to be both one of the youngest students and the first student to be accepted directly from high school.

== Career ==
=== Film and television ===
Brown's first on-screen role was as a teenager in the original series of Heartbreak High.

Some of Brown's guest roles include White Collar Blue (2003), Home and Away (in both 2007 and 2013), Heartbreak High, Drama School, City Homicide (2010), Packed to the Rafters (2012), Mr & Mrs Murder (2013) and Anh Do's Channel 7 comedy pilot Lucky Dragon. He also had a recurring role on The Cooks from 2004 to 2005.

He appeared in Australian feature films The Characters, Temptation in 2003, A Man's Gotta Do in 2004.

Shortly after moving to Mumbai from Sydney in 2007, Brown was cast opposite Bollywood superstar Hrithik Roshan as villain Tony Grover in the film Kites, directed by Anurag Basu and produced by Rakesh Roshan. The film was re-cut for an English audience by Brett Ratner and was released worldwide as Kites The Remix. Kites was released worldwide in May 2010. Brown lived in Mumbai on and off until 2015, where he was typecast as the villain for several years, including in Unindian, opposite Brett Lee in 2015. Other Bollywood film credits to his name include Love You to Death, Prattichaya and Sedition.

Brown played real life heroin drug smuggler Supahaus Chowdury in the 2011 Australian television show Underbelly Files: The Man Who Got Away. From 2015 to 2019, he appeared in the TV shows The Code, The Letdown, Harrow and Netflix series The Unlisted. He played the lead role of Sid in the film Laka and was cast as a regular presenter on children's series Play School.

In 2021 Brown played Sigrid Thornton's love interest Dr. Omar Sebastian in the Channel 9 drama series Amazing Grace, Miles in the Stan film Christmas on the Farm and appeared in the drama series Wakefield.

In 2022, Brown played the role of Rahul in U.S. miniseries Joe vs. Carole (based on Joe Exotic and Carole Baskin), Paul in Channel 9's drama series After the Verdict, Hamish in the Netflix film A Perfect Pairing and Chubba in season 2 of Tim Minchin's Upright.

In 2023, Brown played one of the lead roles Paul Kemble in the ABC musical series In Our Blood and Derek Stevens in season 2 of The PM's Daughter. In 2024 he starred opposite Asher Keddie and David Wenham in the drama series Fake and played Makrand in the Indian Australian film Sahela/Companion.

In 2025 Brown played Gall in Alex Proyas's film R.U.R.

=== Theatre ===
On stage, Brown played villain Nikhil Madhvani (opposite Shilpa Shetty) in Miss Bollywood, which toured Germany and the UK including London's West End. He appeared in There Is No Need To Wake Up at the Sydney Opera House directed by Barrie Kosky; Kurt Weill's Berlin to Broadway, directed by Jim Sharman; Spunks at the Stables Theatre; Frozen for Company B Belvoir St Theatre, directed by Kate Gaul; Toad in the Australian Shakespeare Company's productions of The Wind in the Willows, and Martin Crimp's Fewer Emergencies at the Old Fitzroy Theatre. He also performed in the 2005 Hi-5 Space Magic – World Tour.

In 2010 Brown performed in several international festivals, including representing NIDA at the UNESCO 2007 drama schools festival in Transylvania, Romania, playing Orestes in Aeschylus's Ancient Greek tragedy The Oresteian Trilogy. He also appeared in Project 88 Art Gallery in Mumbai, Doctrine: How to Survive Under Siege in Brussels, Belgium, for the Kunstenfestivaldesarts (2008) and Rehaan Engineer's Seven Jewish Children by Caryl Churchill (2009). He then appeared in three new plays (The New Black, Tilt and Student Body) at the 2010 Australian National Play Festival in Brisbane.

In 2015 Brown played the role of Jesus in Jesus Christ Superstar directed by Alyque Padamsee in Mumbai. He also played Lumiere in Disney India's Beauty and the Beast which toured to Mumbai and Delhi.

From 2016 to 2019 Brown appeared in the plays Lighten Up at Griffin Theatre in Sydney, Still Point Turning and The Long Forgotten Dream for Sydney Theatre Company and the Helpmann Award-winning play Counting and Cracking for Belvoir Theatre Company at Sydney Festival.

From 2019 to 2020 he appeared as Kevin J in the smash hit stage musical Come from Away at the Comedy Theatre, Melbourne. In May 2021, he played Petruchio in William Shakespeare's The Taming of the Shrew with Queensland Theatre (in the Bille Brown Theatre, Brisbane), directed by Damien Ryan. In 2022 Brown played Edmond Rostand opposite Angie Milliken in Queensland Theatre's production of Bernhardt / Hamlet. In 2024 Brown appeared on stage in the Belvoir Theatre production of The Curious Incident Of The Dog In The Night-Time.

=== Writing ===
Nicholas wrote episode 12 of the Netflix/ ABC Me series The Unlisted, and episode 16 of the ABC Kids TV show The Wonder Gang. He co-wrote his first play Lighten Up, which premiered at Sydney's Griffin Theatre. Lighten Up was published by Currency Press, and a monologue from the play was included in the 2016 edition of the book Contemporary Australian Monologues for Men.

He co-wrote the play Lost In Books, which was part of Sydney Festival, and True West for the National Theatre of Parramatta.

Brown's play Sex Magick was produced by Griffin Theatre in 2023. Published by Currency Press, it won the Nick Enright Prize for Playwriting at the 2024 New South Wales Premier's Literary Awards.

In 2024 Brown wrote an autobiographical chapter in the book Growing Up Indian In Australia published by Black Inc. Books.

Brown did some production work on an Indo-Australian Bollywood film in 2010, with Olivia Newton-John.

=== Music ===
In 2011, Brown lived in Los Angeles where he was the lead singer of funk band 'Knuckle Funk' in 2011–2012. The group became a duo a few years later and released two singles renaming themselves 'Luck Now'. The first single "I Spent My Rent On A Record" was released in 2015 and was co-written by Brown. It received regular airplay on MTV Indies and VH1 in India. He also co-wrote and recorded lead vocals for the song "Unpredictable (The Robot Song)" in 2013. As a singer/songwriter, Brown also recorded the album "Big Score" in 2005 with his Australian disco funk band The Modernists in 2004 and performed at Australian venues such as The Basement and The Metro. The album received radio airplay on Sydney radio stations FBI and 2SER.

In 2005, Brown was the male understudy for the children's internationally recognised pop group Hi-5 on their world tour.

Brown was also invited to sing at "Raise the Roof" at Sydney's State Theatre, in a special concert to raise funds for the Tsunami Appeal in 2006. In 2007, before moving to Mumbai, Brown wrote and recorded an unreleased album with the electro rock duo "Listen Like Thieves".

In 2023, Brown released the Italo disco inspired song "Up And Coming" which received radio airplay on Radio One in India, on ABC Radio and FBI. The song was accompanied by an animated music video.

In February 2025, Brown released the Bollywood inspired dance song "Strange Shadow" produced by Sydney DJ Dave Winnel. The sultry music video starred Betty Grumble, was directed by David Charley and choreographed by Shaun Parker. Two remixes of the song were also released by Luke Million and Mind Electric.

In March 2025, Brown released the Nu-Disco dance song "Don't Mind Me" which was accompanied by an animated music video.

=== Radio presenter ===
From 2012 to 2014 Brown was hosting SBS Radio's South Asian – a radio programme for Bollywood, Bhangra and Desi pop music playing on Australian digital radio, online and mobile

=== Community work ===
Brown's charity work has included:

- 2013 – Performing at the National Asbestos Awareness Day Lighting the Sails of the Sydney Opera House event in memory of the victims of asbestos related disease.
- 2012 – Supporting the work of the National Youth Theatre Company Foundation as an ambassador and through facilitating youth welfare programs.
- 2010 – The official male Ambassador for Ovarian Cancer Australia's 2010 Ovarian Cancer Awareness Month campaign
- 2006 – Raise The Roof – Tsunami Appeal special appearance for the Red Cross
- 2005 – Royal Prince Alfred Hospital Foundation – official MC and voice of the RPA Foundation Research Prize
- 2004 – Royal Prince Alfred Hospital – RPA Health Festival volunteer and special guest
- 2003 – Music For Timor – Master of Ceremonies and performer at Music benefit concert to support the work of the Bairo Pite Clinic

== Personal life ==
Nicholas's life story has been documented on the ABC Conversations (radio program) with Sarah Kanowski - A wild Bollywood adventure — from Sydney to Mumbai and back again.

== Acting credits ==
=== Film ===
==== As actor ====
Year	Title	Role	Notes
2003	The Man on the Boat	Driver	Short film
2004	A Man's Gotta Do	Young Doctor	Feature film
2007	Don't Panic	Abe	Short film
2009	Bani Ibrahim	Ghazali	Short film
2010	Kites	Tony	Feature film
2010	After the Credits	Actor	Short film
2011	The 5	Kris	Short film
2011	Random 8	Michael Henderson	
2012	Love You to Death	John	Feature film
2012	The Shadower In	Dani	Short film
2012	Project Top Clown	Eric	Short film
2013	Pink Balloons	Reg	Short film
2014	Time 2 Settle	Host	Video
2014	Imperfectly Frank	Frank	Short film
2015	Moose	Jimmy	Short film
2015	UnIndian	Samir	Feature film
2017	Dance Academy: The Movie	Tutor Stuart	
2017	The Casting Game	Ted	
2017	Khana Khanzana	Gaurav	Short film
2018	Laka		
2019	Martha the Monster	Kevin	Short film
2020	Awake	Nikhil	Short film
2022	The Perfect Pairing	Hamish	
2022	Clerks III	Car Sex Selfie Snapper	Feature film
2023	Companion	Makrand	
2025	Jimpa	Mr Mason	Feature film
TBA	Sedition	Shiva	
TBA	Final Trap	John	

==== As crew ====
Year	Title	Role	Notes
2011	The End	Directors Assistant	
2011	The 5	Assistant to Producer	Short film
2012	Love You to Death	Directors Assistant	Feature film
2012	The Shadower in 3D	Directors Assistant	Short film
2017	The Tribes of Palos Verdes	Production Assistant	Feature film

=== Television ===
==== As actor ====
Year	Title	Role	Notes
1983	All the Rivers Run	Gordon	TV series, 2 episodes
2001	Life Support	Guest	TV series
2003	Temptation	Sachin	TV movie
2003	White Collar Blue	Damien Lewis	TV series
2004	The Cooks	Sachin (main role)	TV series, episodes 1–13
2007–13	Home and Away	Mark Davidson / Padley	TV series
2010	Lucky Dragon	Ranjit	TV pilot
2010	City Homicide	Sanjay Roshan	TV series
2011	Underbelly Files: The Man Who Got Away	Supahaus Chowdury	TV movie
2012	Packed to the Rafters	Yuppie	TV series
2012	Home and Away	Dr Padley	TV series
2013	The Elegant Gentleman's Guide to Knife Fighting	Xavier	TV series
2013	Mr & Mrs Murder	Dt Mukajee	TV series
2013	Cha Do	Ajay	TV series, 2 episodes
2014	The Casuals	Rezwan	TV series, 2 episodes
2016	The Code	Bailey	TV series, 1 episode
2017	The Letdown	Sorab	TV series, 1 episode
2018	Harrow	Peter Sharma	TV series, 1 episode
2019	The Unlisted	Rahul Sharma	TV series, 14 episodes
2021	Wakefield	Kiran	TV series, 3 episodes
2021	Amazing Grace	Omar Sebastian	TV series, 8 episodes
2021	Christmas on the Farm	Miles	TV movie
2022	Joe vs. Carole	Rohul	TV series, 1 episode
2022	After the Verdict	Paul	TV miniseries
2022	Upright	Chubba	TV series, 5 episodes
2023	In Our Blood	Paul Kemble	TV series, 4 episodes
2023	The PM's Daughter	Mr Derek Stevens	TV series, 8 episodes
2023	NCIS: Sydney	Quarter Master Rennie	TV series, 1 episode
2024	Fake	Anton	TV series, 8 episodes
2026	Shakedown	Eden	TV series

==== As writer ====
Year	Title	Role	Notes
2019	The Unlisted	Writer	TV series, episode 12
2020; 2021	Play School	Writer	TV series, season 55, 3 episodes
2021	The Wonder Gang	Writer	TV series, episode 16: "The Wonder Gang and the Lizard Question"

=== Stage ===
==== As performer ====
Year	Title	Role	Company / Location
1998	Clark in Sarajevo	Boris / Commander / Haris / Henri / Old Man	NIDA Parade Rehearsal Rooms, Sydney
1999	The Cherry Orchard	Lopakhin / Station Master	NIDA Parade Studio, Sydney
1999	Romeo and Juliet	Sampson / Friar Lawrence / Peter	NIDA Parade Studio, Sydney
1999	The Beaux’ Stratagem	Sullen	NIDA Parade Theatre, Sydney
1999	The Post Office		NIDA Parade Theatre, Sydney
1999 or 2000	Mourning Becomes Electra		
2000	The Golden Age	Mac / George Ross / James / German Man	NIDA Parade Theatre Sydney
2000	Berlin to Broadway with Kurt Weill		NIDA Parade Studio
2000	There is No Need to Wake Up		Sydney Opera House
2001	Instant Karma		Bondi Pavilion, Sydney
2002	Pokie Face	Luigi Jnr	Short+Sweet
2002	Sticks and Stones	Joe	Brainstorm Productions
2002	Spunks	Chad	Push Up Theatre at Stables Theatre
2003	Frozen	Patrick	Belvoir Theatre Company with Company B, Siren Theatre Company
2003	The Wind in the Willows	Mr Toad	Australian Shakespeare Company
2003	Burning Bridges – A Musical Odyssey	Various characters	Opera X
2004	Spew		Darlinghurst Theatre, Sydney
2005	Hi-5 Space Magic – World Tour	Understudy / Swing	Kids Like Us
2006	Fewer Emergencies	Various characters	Old Fitzroy Theatre with Tamarama Rock Surfers & AnyRoad Productions
2007	The Oresteia	Orestes	NIDA at the UNESCO Festival Transylvania
2007	Miss Bollywood – The Shilpa Shetty Musical	Nikhil Madhvani	Germany, UK & Royal Albert Hall tour with Cineyug
2008	Doctrine: How to Survive Under Siege	Xerxes	Kunsten Festival Des Arts, Belgium
2009	Seven Jewish Children	1	Industrial Theatre Company
2010	The New Black, Tilt, Student Body	Various	2010 Australian National Play Festival, Brisbane
2012	The Wind in the Willows	Badger	Australian Shakespeare Company
2013	The Wind in the Willows	Mr Toad	Australian Shakespeare Company
2014–15	Jesus Christ Superstar	Jesus	Mumbai with Raell Padamsee's Ace Productions
	Beauty and the Beast	Lumiere	Mumbai & Delhi
2016	Lighten Up	John Green	Stables Theatre, Sydney with Griffin Theatre Company (also playwright)
2018	Still Point Turning: The Catherine McGregor Story	Rahul Dravid	Wharf Theatre with STC
2018	The Long Forgotten Dream	Mandeep	Sydney Opera House with STC
2019	Counting and Cracking	Hasanga	Sydney Town Hall with Belvoir Theatre Company for Sydney Festival, Ridley Centre, Adelaide
2019	Come from Away	Kevin J	Comedy Theatre, Melbourne
2021–2022	The Taming of the Shrew	Petruchio	Bille Brown Theatre, Brisbane with Queensland Theatre, Riverside Theatres Parramatta, Belgrave Cinema, Armidale, Inlet Cinema, Sussex Inlet, Huskisson Pictures
2022	Bernhardt / Hamlet	Edmond Rostand	Queensland Theatre
2024	The Curious Incident of the Dog in the Night-Time	Mr Shears / various roles	Belvoir Street Theatre
2025	Circle Mirror Transformation	TBC	Wharf Theatre with STC

==== As writer ====
Year	Title	Role	Company / Location
2004	Rain Supreme	Director / Writer	Newtown Theatre, Sydney for Short+Sweet
2005	The Glass Soul	Writer	Newtown Theatre, Sydney for Short+Sweet
2016	Lighten Up	Playwright	Stables Theatre, Sydney with Griffin Theatre Company
	Lost In Books	Co-writer	Sydney Festival
2021	True West: Myths and Legends	Co-writer	National Theatre of Parramatta for Sydney Festival
2023	Sex Magick	Writer	Griffin Theatre Company

== Awards ==
Year	Work	Award	Category	Result
2004	Nicholas Brown	Mike Walsh Fellowship	Costume	Honoured
2018	Laka	Red Nation Film Festival	Outstanding Performance by an Actor in a Leading Role	Nominated
2024	Sex Magick	NSW Premier's Literary Award	Nick Enright Prize for Playwriting	Won
