= Apart Together (album) =

Studio album by Tim Minchin
- Released: 20 November 2020
- Length: 49:58
- Label: BMG

Tim Minchin chronology
So Fucking Rock (2013)	Apart Together (2020)	Time Machine (2025)

Singles from Apart Together
- 1. "Leaving LA" Released: 13 March 2020; 2. "I'll Take Lonely Tonight" Released: 18 June 2020; 3. "Apart Together" Released: 13 August 2020; 4. "Airport Piano" Released: 25 September 2020; 5. "The Absence of You" Released: 30 October 2020

Apart Together is the debut studio album by Australian musician Tim Minchin. It was released on 20 November 2020.

== Background ==
Following his career in musical comedy, Minchin semi-retired from touring after his 2010/11 international arena tour Tim Minchin and the Heritage Orchestra and writing the music and lyrics for the Royal Shakespeare Company's award-winning Matilda the Musical to focus on other projects such as appearing in acting roles as Atticus Fetch in the US series Californication and Judas in the 2012/13 arena tour of Jesus Christ Superstar. At this time, Minchin moved with his family to Los Angeles to write and direct an animated movie for DreamWorks Animation called Larrikins, which was cancelled in March 2017 after four years of work. His second stage musical Groundhog Day had also closed after running for six months on Broadway.

After moving to back to Australia, Minchin revealed he was working on an album and visited Australia, New Zealand and the UK for the first time in eight years on the BACK: Old Songs, New Songs, Fuck You Songs tour in 2019/20.

In March 2020, it was revealed that Minchin signed a record deal with BMG and would release Apart Together, his debut studio album (after previously releasing numerous live albums of his musical comedy shows), on 20 November 2020. The album contains four songs played on the BACK tour; "If This Plane Goes Down", "Leaving LA", "I'll Take Lonely Tonight" and "Carry You", which was written for the TV series Upright that Minchin starred in, co-wrote, and co-directed.

On 13 March 2020, "Leaving LA" was released as a single with the animated music video by Tee Ken Ng using zoetropes. "I'll Take Lonely Tonight" was released on 18 June 2020, with "Apart Together" on 13 August 2020, and "Airport Piano" on 25 September 2020. The final single from the album, "The Absence of You", was released on 30 October 2020, alongside a one-shot music video.

== Track listing ==
All tracks are written by Tim Minchin.

Apart Together track listing
No.	Title	Length
1.	"Summer Romance"	4:37
2.	"Apart Together"	4:15
3.	"Airport Piano"	3:53
4.	"The Absence of You"	4:30
5.	"I Can't Save You"	3:41
6.	"Talked Too Much, Stayed Too Long"	4:48
7.	"Leaving LA"	4:55
8.	"I'll Take Lonely Tonight"	6:29
9.	"Beautiful Head"	4:02
10.	"If This Plane Goes Down"	5:11
11.	"Carry You"	3:37
Total length:		49:58

== Charts ==
Chart performance for Apart Together
Chart (2020)	Peak position
Australian Albums (ARIA)	3
Scottish Albums (Official Charts)	21
UK Albums (Official Charts)	27

== Live performances ==
On 19 November 2020, a pre-recorded concert of the album was released online worldwide for 48 hours during the COVID-19 pandemic. The concert was filmed at the Trackdown Studios in Sydney. This was again released on YouTube on 16 November 2023.

On 20 and 21 February 2021, Minchin performed the album with the West Australian Symphony Orchestra (conducted by Jessica Gethin) at the Kings Park and Botanic Garden, in Perth, Western Australia as part of the Perth Festival. The concert also ended with "When I Grow Up" (from Matilda) and "White Wine in the Sun" performed as encores.
