= Tim Minchin and the Heritage Orchestra Tour =

2010–12 concert tour by Tim Minchin

- Tour by Tim Minchin
- UK tour poster
- Start date: 8 December 2010
- End date: 15 February 2012
- Legs: 4
- No. of shows: 27

Tim Minchin concert chronology
- Ready for This? Tour (2009–2010); Tim Minchin and the Heritage Orchestra (2010–2012); Back Tour (2019–2022)

Tim Minchin and the Heritage Orchestra is an orchestral concert tour by Australian musician and comedian Tim Minchin, accompanied by the Heritage Orchestra (UK dates) and city symphony orchestras (Australian dates, titled Tim Minchin vs. The Orchestras).

== Set list ==
1. "I'm in a Cage / Nothing Ruins Comedy"
2. "Rock N Roll Nerd"
3. "Cont"
4. "If I Didn't Have You"
5. "Thank You God"
6. "You Grew On Me"
7. "The Fence"

Interval

1. "Prejudice"
2. "Lullaby"
3. "The Pope Song / Pope Disco"
4. "Cheese"
5. "Beauty"
6. "Dark Side"

Encore

1. "Not Perfect"
2. "White Wine in the Sun"

== Tour dates ==
Date	City	Country	Venue	Orchestra
Tim Minchin and the Heritage Orchestra - United Kingdom
8 December 2010	Birmingham	England	National Indoor Arena	Heritage Orchestra
11 December 2010	Newcastle upon Tyne	England	Newcastle Arena	Heritage Orchestra
13 December 2010	Brighton	England	Brighton Centre	Heritage Orchestra
14 December 2010	London	England	The O2 Arena	Heritage Orchestra
16 December 2010	Cardiff	Wales	Cardiff International Arena	Heritage Orchestra
17 December 2010	Manchester	England	Manchester Arena	Heritage Orchestra
18 December 2010	Nottingham	England	Nottingham Arena	Heritage Orchestra
Tim Minchin vs. The Orchestras - Australia
25 February 2011	Melbourne	Australia	Palais Theatre	Melbourne Symphony Orchestra
26 February 2011	Melbourne	Australia	Palais Theatre	Melbourne Symphony Orchestra
4 March 2011	Perth	Australia	Pioneer Women's Memorial – Kings Park & Botanic Garden	West Australian Symphony Orchestra
11 March 2011	Adelaide	Australia	Adelaide Festival Theatre	Adelaide Symphony Orchestra
18 March 2011	Brisbane	Australia	Brisbane Convention & Exhibition Centre	Queensland Pops Orchestra
24 March 2011	Sydney	Australia	Sydney Opera House	Sydney Symphony Orchestra
25 March 2011	Sydney	Australia	Sydney Opera House	Sydney Symphony Orchestra
Tim Minchin and the Heritage Orchestra: Round II - United Kingdom
16 April 2011	Edinburgh	Scotland	Edinburgh Playhouse	Heritage Orchestra
17 April 2011	Edinburgh	Scotland	Edinburgh Playhouse	Heritage Orchestra
18 April 2011	Glasgow	Scotland	Clyde Auditorium	Heritage Orchestra
19 April 2011	Aberdeen	Scotland	Aberdeen Exhibition and Conference Centre	Heritage Orchestra
28 April 2011	London	England	Royal Albert Hall	Heritage Orchestra
29 April 2011	London	England	Royal Albert Hall	Heritage Orchestra
10 May 2011	Sheffield	England	Motorpoint Arena Sheffield	Heritage Orchestra
11 May 2011	Liverpool	England	Echo Arena	Heritage Orchestra
Tim Minchin vs. The Orchestras: Round II - Australia
28 January 2012	Brisbane	Australia	Brisbane Convention & Exhibition Centre	Queensland Symphony Orchestra
3 February 2012	Sydney	Australia	State Theatre	Sydney Symphony Orchestra
8 February 2012	Melbourne	Australia	Palais Theatre	Melbourne Symphony Orchestra
10 February 2012	Perth	Australia	Challenge Stadium	West Australian Symphony Orchestra
15 February 2012	Adelaide	Australia	Adelaide Entertainment Centre	Adelaide Symphony Orchestra

== Home releases ==
=== CD and Audio ===
The tour was recorded for CD and audio at the Manchester Arena on 17 December 2010.

=== DVD ===
The tour was filmed at the Royal Albert Hall, London on 29 April 2011 (coincidentally the same date as the wedding of Prince William and Catherine Middleton, which Minchin referenced). The DVD was released on 14 November 2011, and subsequently broadcast on television and Netflix.
