= Helen Parker =

Helen Parker may refer to:

- Helen Eugenia Parker, American architect
- Helen Parker (musician), producer of So F**king Rock Live
- Helen Parker, character, see List of Heartbeat episodes
- Helen Parker, character in Scattergood Baines
- Helen Parker, character in Lord Babs
- The Old-Fashioned Dress: Portrait of Miss Helen Parker, see List of works by Thomas Eakins

== See also ==
- Ellen Parker (disambiguation)
