= Ready for This =

Ready for This may refer to:

- Ready for This?, a comedy album by Tim Minchin
- Ready for This (TV series), an Australian television drama series
- "Ready for This", a song from the Hazbin Hotel soundtrack
