= Back Tour =

2019–22 concert tour by Tim Minchin

BACK
- Tour by Tim Minchin
- 2019 tour poster
- Start date: 5 March 2019
- End date: 22 January 2022
- Legs: 6
- No. of shows: 133
- Attendance: 260,836

Tim Minchin concert chronology
- Tim Minchin and the Heritage Orchestra (2010–2011); BACK Tour (2019–2022); An Unfunny Evening with Tim Minchin and His Piano (2023–2024)

The BACK Tour (subtitled Old Songs, New Songs, F*** You Songs) was a concert tour by Australian musician Tim Minchin. The tour began on 5 March 2019 at the Thebarton Theatre in Adelaide before touring Australia, New Zealand, and the United Kingdom before concluding on 22 January 2022 at the Enmore Theatre, Sydney.

== Background ==
On 29 August 2018, it was announced that Tim Minchin would be making his first tour following his orchestra arena tour in 2010 and 2011 (with the exception of a micro tour of Los Angeles in 2017 called Leaving LA) promoted by Live Nation Entertainment in Australian and New Zealand in March and April 2019 and Phil McIntyre in the UK in October and November 2019.

The 2019 tour featured old songs from his previous musical comedy shows and songs from his stage musicals Matilda, Groundhog Day and his TV series Upright. It also featured new songs reflecting Minchin's past experiences, relationships, social and political views such as "If This Plane Goes Down", "Leaving LA", "I'll Take Lonely Tonight", "Carry You" and "Talked Too Much, Stayed Too Long" which also feature on Minchin's studio album Apart Together released in 2020.

Due to the popularity of the sold-out Australian and New Zealand tour, it was announced that Minchin would be touring again as an Encore tour in March 2020, however due to the COVID-19 pandemic dates had to be rescheduled to January and February 2021, then again to June and July 2021, with a couple of dates announced as part of the Adelaide Cabaret Festival. Also dates were announced for an Encore tour of the UK in October and November 2021. The 2021 dates feature most of the songs from the 2019/20 tour with more songs replaced with songs from the Apart Together album including "Airport Piano" and "The Absence of You".

During the tour, VIP tickets were sold raising the money to various charities in which $1.25million was raised.

== Tour band ==
- Tim Minchin; lead vocals, piano, guitar
- Jak Housden; guitar, BV's
- Sarah Belkner; keys, BV's, guiro, tambourine, melodica, keytar, guitar, piano, assistant MD
- Pete Clements; bass guitar (2019 UK tour)
- Brad Webb; drums (2019 UK tour)
- Tom Richards; alto saxophone, baritone saxophone, flute, dancer (2019 UK tour)
- Rory Simmons; trumpet, flugelhorn, piccolo trumpet, dancer (2019 UK tour)
- Emma Bassett; trombone (2019 UK tour)

== Set list ==
1. "If This Plane Goes Down"
2. "F Sharp"
3. "Mitsubishi Colt"
4. "Thank You God"
5. "Airport Piano"
6. "15 Minutes"
7. "The Absence of You"
8. "If I Didn't Have You"

Interval

1. "Leaving LA"
2. "Cheese"
3. "I'll Take Lonely Tonight"
4. "Talked Too Much, Stayed Too Long"

Encore

1. "Carry You"
Notes
- Minchin performs "If This Plane Goes Down", "F Sharp", "Mitsubishi Colt" and "Thank You God" solo (piano and vocals) before performing with the full band in "Airport Piano" onwards.
- Songs previously used in the 2019/20 tour included "Rock N Roll Nerd", "Woody Allen Jesus" (with a segment of "Heaven on their Minds" from Jesus Christ Superstar), "Prejudice", "Pope Song", "Fuck This", "When I Grow Up" (from Matilda), "Seeing You" (from Groundhog Day) and "White Wine in the Sun"
- Songs added for the 2021 tour include "Airport Piano", "The Absence of You" and "Talked Too Much, Stayed Too Long". On the final UK tour date at Shepherd's Bush Empire, an impromptu rendition of the song "White Wine in the Sun" was also performed after the encore.

== Tour dates ==
Date	City	Country	Venue
Australia and New Zealand tour
5 March 2019	Adelaide	Australia	Thebarton Theatre
6 March 2019	Adelaide	Australia	Thebarton Theatre
7 March 2019	Adelaide	Australia	Thebarton Theatre
8 March 2019	Adelaide	Australia	Thebarton Theatre
9 March 2019	Adelaide	Australia	Thebarton Theatre
12 March 2019	Canberra	Australia	Canberra Theatre
13 March 2019	Canberra	Australia	Canberra Theatre
14 March 2019	Canberra	Australia	Canberra Theatre
15 March 2019	Canberra	Australia	Canberra Theatre
16 March 2019	Canberra	Australia	Canberra Theatre
19 March 2019	Perth	Australia	Crown Theatre
20 March 2019	Perth	Australia	Crown Theatre
21 March 2019	Perth	Australia	Crown Theatre
22 March 2019	Perth	Australia	Crown Theatre
23 March 2019	Perth	Australia	Crown Theatre
26 March 2019	Sydney	Australia	State Theatre
27 March 2019	Sydney	Australia	State Theatre
28 March 2019	Sydney	Australia	State Theatre
29 March 2019	Sydney	Australia	State Theatre
3 April 2019	Melbourne	Australia	Palais Theatre
4 April 2019	Melbourne	Australia	Palais Theatre
5 April 2019	Melbourne	Australia	Palais Theatre
6 April 2019	Melbourne	Australia	Palais Theatre
7 April 2019	Melbourne	Australia	Palais Theatre
9 April 2019	Brisbane	Australia	Queensland Performing Arts Centre
10 April 2019	Brisbane	Australia	Queensland Performing Arts Centre
11 April 2019	Brisbane	Australia	Queensland Performing Arts Centre
12 April 2019	Brisbane	Australia	Queensland Performing Arts Centre
14 April 2019	Auckland	New Zealand	ASB Theatre
15 April 2019	Auckland	New Zealand	ASB Theatre
16 April 2019	Auckland	New Zealand	ASB Theatre
18 April 2019	Wellington	New Zealand	Michael Fowler Centre
19 April 2019	Wellington	New Zealand	Michael Fowler Centre
23 April 2019	Melbourne	Australia	Palais Theatre
24 April 2019	Melbourne	Australia	Palais Theatre
28 April 2019	Sydney	Australia	State Theatre
29 April 2019	Sydney	Australia	State Theatre
30 April 2019	Sydney	Australia	State Theatre
3 May 2019	Gold Coast	Australia	The Star
4 May 2019	Gold Coast	Australia	The Star
United Kingdom tour
15 October 2019	Ipswich	England	Regent Theatre
16 October 2019	Ipswich	England	Regent Theatre
17 October 2019	Oxford	England	New Theatre
18 October 2019	Oxford	England	New Theatre
19 October 2019	Oxford	England	New Theatre
22 October 2019	Sheffield	England	City Hall
23 October 2019	Nottingham	England	Royal Concert Hall
24 October 2019	Nottingham	England	Royal Concert Hall
25 October 2019	Manchester	England	O2 Apollo
26 October 2019	Manchester	England	O2 Apollo
29 October 2019	Cardiff	Wales	St David's Hall
30 October 2019	Cardiff	Wales	St David's Hall
31 October 2019	Liverpool	England	Empire Theatre
1 November 2019	Liverpool	England	Empire Theatre
2 November 2019	Portsmouth	England	Guildhall
5 November 2019	Plymouth	England	Pavilions
6 November 2019	Plymouth	England	Pavilions
7 November 2019	London	England	Eventim Apollo
8 November 2019	London	England	Eventim Apollo
9 November 2019	London	England	Palladium
12 November 2019	London	England	Eventim Apollo
13 November 2019	London	England	Eventim Apollo
14 November 2019	London	England	Eventim Apollo
15 November 2019	Birmingham	England	Hippodrome
16 November 2019	Birmingham	England	Hippodrome
19 November 2019	Edinburgh	Scotland	Playhouse
20 November 2019	Edinburgh	Scotland	Playhouse
21 November 2019	Gateshead	England	Sage
22 November 2019	Glasgow	Scotland	SEC Armadillo
23 November 2019	Edinburgh	Scotland	Playhouse
26 November 2019	Brighton	England	Dome
27 November 2019	Brighton	England	Dome
28 November 2019	Southend-on-Sea	England	Cliffs Pavilion
29 November 2019	Southend-on-Sea	England	Cliffs Pavilion
30 November 2019	Southend-on-Sea	England	Cliffs Pavilion
Australia – Encore tour
6 March 2020	Perth	Australia	Crown
7 March 2020	Perth	Australia	Crown
12 March 2020	Hobart	Australia	Wrest Point Entertainment Centre
13 March 2020	Hobart	Australia	Wrest Point Entertainment Centre
14 March 2020	Hobart	Australia	Wrest Point Entertainment Centre
Australia and New Zealand – Encore tour (rescheduled due to COVID-19 pandemic)
12 June 2021	Adelaide	Australia	Adelaide Festival Theatre (as part of the Adelaide Cabaret Festival)
13 June 2021	Adelaide	Australia	Adelaide Festival Theatre (as part of the Adelaide Cabaret Festival)
17 June 2021	Wellington	New Zealand	Michael Fowler Centre
19 June 2021	Auckland	New Zealand	Civic Theatre
20 June 2021	Auckland	New Zealand	Civic Theatre
25 June 2021	Christchurch	New Zealand	Christchurch Town Hall
2 July 2021	Melbourne	Australia	Hamer Hall
3 July 2021	Melbourne	Australia	Hamer Hall
4 July 2021	Melbourne	Australia	Hamer Hall
5 July 2021	Melbourne	Australia	Hamer Hall
6 July 2021	Melbourne	Australia	Hamer Hall
7 July 2021	Melbourne	Australia	Hamer Hall
12 July 2021	Brisbane	Australia	Fortitude Music Hall
13 July 2021	Brisbane	Australia	Fortitude Music Hall
14 July 2021	Brisbane	Australia	Fortitude Music Hall
15 July 2021	Brisbane	Australia	Fortitude Music Hall
United Kingdom – Encore tour
16 October 2021	Aberdeen	Scotland	P&J Live
17 October 2021	Edinburgh	Scotland	Festival Theatre
19 October 2021	York	England	Barbican
20 October 2021	Dundee	Scotland	Caird Hall
23 October 2021	Birmingham	England	Hippodrome
24 October 2021	Birmingham	England	Hippodrome
25 October 2021	Brighton	England	Brighton Centre
26 October 2021	Brighton	England	Brighton Centre
28 October 2021	Portsmouth	England	Portsmouth Guildhall
31 October 2021	Newcastle upon Tyne	England	O2 City Hall
1 November 2021	Newcastle upon Tyne	England	O2 City Hall
2 November 2021	Leeds	England	First Direct Arena
3 November 2021	Hull	England	Bonus Arena
6 November 2021	Manchester	England	O2 Apollo
7 November 2021	Manchester	England	O2 Apollo
8 November 2021	London	England	Eventim Apollo
9 November 2021	London	England	Eventim Apollo
10 November 2021	Portsmouth	England	Portsmouth Guildhall
11 November 2021	London	England	Eventim Apollo
14 November 2021	Nottingham	England	Motorpoint Arena
15 November 2021	Manchester	England	O2 Apollo
17 November 2021	Leicester	England	De Montfort Hall
18 November 2021	Ipswich	England	Regent Theatre
20 November 2021	Blackpool	England	Opera House
21 November 2021	Stockton-on-Tees	England	Globe Theatre
22 November 2021	Stockton-on-Tees	England	Globe Theatre
24 November 2021	Cardiff	Wales	Motorpoint Arena
25 November 2021	Oxford	England	New Theatre
27 November 2021	Plymouth	England	Plymouth Pavilion
28 November 2021	Bournemouth	England	International Centre
30 November 2021	London	England	Shepherd's Bush Empire
1 December 2021	London	England	Shepherd's Bush Empire
Australia – Encore tour (rescheduled due to COVID-19 pandemic)
11 January 2022	Newcastle	Australia	Civic Theatre
12 January 2022	Newcastle	Australia	Civic Theatre
18 January 2022	Sydney	Australia	Enmore Theatre
19 January 2022	Sydney	Australia	Enmore Theatre
20 January 2022	Sydney	Australia	Enmore Theatre
21 January 2022	Sydney	Australia	Enmore Theatre
22 January 2022	Sydney	Australia	Enmore Theatre

== Filmed recording ==
On 17 February 2022, Minchin revealed that the final UK shows at the Shepherd's Bush Empire, London were filmed and due to be released at a later date. On 11 October 2022, it was revealed that the recording would be shown in cinemas in the UK and Ireland on 23 November 2022.
