= Canvas Bags =

Canvas Bags may refer to:

- Bags made of canvas
- Canvas bags, a controversial gimmick used in the marketing of Fallout 76
- "Canvas Bags", a 2006 song from the album So Rock by Australian musical comedian Tim Minchin
