= Time Machine (Tim Minchin album) =

Studio album by Tim Minchin
- Released: 25 July 2025
- Studio: Damien Gerard (Gosford); Studios 301; Melody St
- Length: 48:20
- Label: BMG
- Producer: Tim Minchin

Tim Minchin chronology
Apart Together (2020)	Time Machine (2025)

Singles from Time Machine
- 1. "Ruby" Released: 2 April 2025; 2. "The Song of the Masochist" Released: 8 May 2025; 3. "I Wouldn't Like You" Released: 5 June 2025; 4. "You Grew on Me" Released: 3 July 2025

Time Machine is the second studio album by Australian musician Tim Minchin, released on 25 July 2025 by BMG.

== Track listing ==
All tracks are written by Tim Minchin.

Time Machine track listing
No.	Title	Length
1.	"Understand It"	4:27
2.	"I Wouldn't Like You"	3:25
3.	"Ruby"	3:37
4.	"The Song of the Masochist"	3:55
5.	"You Grew on Me"	4:13
6.	"Dark Side"	4:05
7.	"Pop Song"	3:35
8.	"Moment of Bliss"	4:56
9.	"Rock n Roll Nerd"	6:18
10.	"If All You Ever Had Was Love"	4:13
11.	"Not Perfect"	5:31
Total length:		48:20

== Personnel ==
Credits adapted from the album's liner notes.

- Tim Minchin – production, piano, keyboards, vocals
- Jak Housden – guitars
- Evan Mannell – drums, percussion
- James Haselwood – bass (tracks 1, 4–6, 9, 11)
- Rowan Lane – bass (2, 3, 7, 8, 10)
- Andrew Beck – engineering
- Jack Garzonio – engineering
- Murray Dilger – engineering assistance
- Brad Hasiuk – engineering assistance
- Eric J Dubowsky – mixing
- Brian Lucey – mastering
- Neil Wurmel – album design
- Damian Bennett – photography
- Mark Rogers – additional photography
