= Songs the World Will Never Hear Tour =

2025 concert tour by Tim Minchin

Songs The World Will Never Hear
- Tour by Tim Minchin
- Tour poster artwork
- Start date: 4 June 2025
- End date: 7 December 2025
- Legs: 2
- No. of shows: 49

Tim Minchin concert chronology
- An Unfunny Evening with Tim Minchin and His Piano (2023–2024); Songs The World Will Never Hear Tour (2025)

The Songs the World Will Never Hear Tour (subtitled Celebrating 20 years of FKN Hardcore Rock n Roll Nerding) is a concert tour by Australian musician and comedian Tim Minchin. The tour is in celebration of Minchin's 20 year career following his breakout Edinburgh Fringe show in 2005, featuring songs from his musical comedy career, musicals Matilda and Groundhog Day and songs from his early song writing career. The title is a reference to Minchin's song "Rock n Roll Nerd".

== Setlist ==
1. "Turn"
2. "Rock 'n' Roll Nerd"
3. "You Grew on Me"
4. "I Wouldn't Like You"
5. "Ruby"
6. "Lullaby"
7. "The Good Book"
8. "I'll Take Lonely Tonight"
9. "Canvas Bags"

Interval

1. "YouTube Lament"
2. "Confessions"
3. "Revolting Children"
4. "Apart Together"
5. "Peace"
6. "The Song of the Massochist"
7. "I Know Everything"
8. "Seeing You"
9. "Darkside"

Encore

1. "That's What Friends Are For"

== Tour dates ==
List of 2025 concerts
Date	City	Country	Venue
United Kingdom tour
4 June 2025	London	England	Soho Theatre Walthamstow
5 June 2025	London	England	Soho Theatre Walthamstow
7 June 2025	Plymouth	England	Plymouth Pavilions
8 June 2025	Plymouth	England	Plymouth Pavilions
9 June 2025	Birmingham	England	Symphony Hall
10 June 2025	Leicester	England	De Montfort Hall
13 June 2025	Sheffield	England	City Hall
14 June 2025	Hull	England	Connexin Live Arena
15 June 2025	Cardiff	Wales	Utilita Arena
16 June 2025	Nottingham	England	Royal Concert Hall
19 June 2025	Blackpool	England	Opera House
20 June 2025	Edinburgh	Scotland	Playhouse
21 June 2025	Glasgow	Scotland	SEC Armadillo
23 June 2025	Leeds	England	First Direct Arena
24 June 2025	Newcastle upon Tyne	England	O2 City Hall
25 June 2025	Newcastle upon Tyne	England	O2 City Hall
27 June 2025	Manchester	England	Opera House
28 June 2025	Liverpool	England	Empire Theatre
30 June 2025	Oxford	England	New Theatre
1 July 2025	Oxford	England	New Theatre
2 July 2025	Brighton	England	Brighton Centre
4 July 2025	London	England	Eventim Apollo
5 July 2025	London	England	Eventim Apollo
6 July 2025	London	England	Eventim Apollo
9 July 2025	Birmingham	England	Symphony Hall
10 July 2025	Birmingham	England	Symphony Hall
12 July 2025	Manchester	England	Opera House
13 July 2025	Manchester	England	Opera House
14 July 2025	Bournemouth	England	International Centre
17 July 2025	Sheffield	England	City Hall
18 July 2025	Bath	England	The Forum
19 July 2025	Bath	England	The Forum
20 July 2025	Nottingham	England	Royal Concert Hall
Australia tour
31 October 2025	Melbourne	Australia	Palais Theatre
1 November 2025	Melbourne	Australia	Palais Theatre
2 November 2025	Melbourne	Australia	Palais Theatre
6 November 2025	Brisbane	Australia	Convention & Exhibition Centre
7 November 2025	Brisbane	Australia	Convention & Exhibition Centre
8 November 2025	Adelaide	Australia	Entertainment Centre Arena
13 November 2025	Canberra	Australia	Canberra Theatre Centre
14 November 2025	Canberra	Australia	Canberra Theatre Centre
15 November 2025	Canberra	Australia	Canberra Theatre Centre
16 November 2025	Canberra	Australia	Canberra Theatre Centre
21 November 2025	Perth	Australia	Perth High Performance Centre
22 November 2025	Perth	Australia	Perth High Performance Centre
27 November 2025	Newcastle	Australia	Newcastle Entertainment Centre
29 November 2025	Sydney	Australia	ICC Sydney
6 December 2025	Gold Coast	Australia	The Star Gold Coast Theatre
7 December 2025	Toowoomba	Australia	Empire Theatre
