= Ellen Parker =

Ellen Parker may refer to:

- Ellen Parker (actress) (born 1949), American actress
- Ellen Parker (politician), Canadian educator and NDP candidate

== See also ==
- Helen Parker (disambiguation)
