= The Cooks =

- Genre: Drama Comedy
- Written by: Sue Smith; Andrew Kelly; Tim Pye; Emily Ballou; Blake Ayshford; Alice Addison
- Directed by: Tony Tilse; Ian Gilmour; Brendan Maher; Ian Watson
- Country of origin: Australia
- Original language: English
- No. of series: 1
- No. of episodes: 13

Production
- Executive producer: Sue Masters
- Producer: Penny Chapman
- Running time: 60 minutes
- Production company: Chapman Pictures

Original release
- Network: Network 10
- Release: 18 October 2004 – 13 January 2005

The Cooks is an Australian television drama series that ran for one season on Network Ten during the summer of 2004/05. It was a co-production with subscription television and screened on the UKTV channel on Foxtel. It was produced by Penny Chapman and Sue Masters. The directors were Tony Tilse, Ian Gilmour, Brendan Maher and Ian Watson.

== Synopsis ==
The Cooks was about the love and war involving the staff of two restaurants on the same street. R&R's Restaurant was run by chefs Rita and Ruth, with waitress Argentine Carmelita. Across the road at Snatch and Grab, its chefs are Gabe and Sachin, who's of Indian descent, with Dishpig at the sink.

The Cooks was a spin-off of a telemovie called Temptation, which screened in 2003, starring Colin Friels as Roberto Francobelli.

== Locations ==
Most of the exterior scenes were filmed around the inner west areas of Sydney. On the show, the setting of the restaurants was in the suburb of Summer Hill.

== Cast ==
- Toby Schmitz as Gabe Francobelli
- Kate Atkinson as Ruth O'Neill
- Nicholas Brown as Sachin
- Rhondda Findleton as Rita Molloy
- Leon Ford as Dishpig
- Emma Lung as Carmelita
- Bojana Novakovic as Raffa
- Sophia Irvine as Rosie Francobelli
- Matt Passmore as Jake
- Robert Mammone as Michael
- Jeanie Drynan as Leanne Smith
- Gyton Grantley as Danny
- Rachel Gordon as Annette
- Tiriel Mora as George
- Justin Monjo as TV Evangelist

== Episode list ==
- Episode 1: "Nights of Living Dangerously": Air Date: 18 October 2004
- Episode 2: "Desiree": Air Date: 28 October 2004
- Episode 3: "The Olive Garden": Air Date: 4 November 2004
- Episode 4: "Swimming Upstream": Air Date: 11 November 2004
- Episode 5: "Waltzing Sakamoto": Air Date: 18 November 2004
- Episode 6: "The Gingerbread Man": Air Date: 25 November 2004
- Episode 7: "Beef with You": Air Date: 2 December 2004
- Episode 8: "Beer and Skittles": Air Date: 9 December 2004
- Episode 9: "Blood and Chocolate": Air Date: 16 December 2004
- Episode 10: "Hole Lotta Love": Air Date: 23 December 2004
- Episode 11: "Heart of Marshmallow": Air Date: 30 December 2004
- Episode 12: "Honey and Wounds": Air Date: 6 January 2005
- Episode 13: "Sticky": Air Date: 13 January 2005
- Episode 13: "Sticky Part 2": Air Date: 14 January 2005

== See also ==
- List of Australian television series
