= Griff the Invisible =

- Theatrical release poster
- Directed by: Leon Ford
- Written by: Leon Ford
- Produced by: Nicole O'Donohue
- Starring: Ryan Kwanten; Maeve Dermody; Toby Schmitz; Heather Mitchell
- Cinematography: Simon Chapman
- Edited by: Karen Johnson
- Music by: Sep Caton; Lee Devaney; Larissa Rate
- Production company: Green Park Pictures
- Distributed by: Transmission Films; Paramount Pictures
- Release date: 10 September 2010 (Toronto)
- Running time: 90 minutes
- Country: Australia
- Language: English
- Budget: $2 million
- Box office: $147,831

Griff the Invisible is a 2010 Australian romantic superhero comedy-drama film written and directed by Leon Ford. Its storyline centres on a socially awkward office worker bullied by his workmates during the daytime and turning himself at nighttime into a superhero who roams the streets of his neighbourhood and protects the innocent.

Griff the Invisible had its world premiere at the 2010 Toronto International Film Festival (TIFF), where it was well received by audiences "who seemed charmed by this offbeat tale". It also screened at the 2011 Berlin International Film Festival in February 2011 in the "generation" sidebar where it was well received by a predominantly teenage crowd. The film won the AACTA award for Best Original Screenplay.

== Plot ==
Griff is a socially awkward person who gets bullied by co-worker Tony by day. At night he dons the costume of a superhero and fights criminals. At times his brother Tim visits him. One day Tim tells Griff about his girlfriend Melody and brings her with him the next time he visits. Melody is shown to be a girl who lives in a world of absurd thoughts, such as a determination to pass through solid objects, and also isn't comfortable with other people. When Melody breaks up with Tim due to them having nothing in common, Griff and Melody start to fall in love.

After enduring further bullying at work, Griff gets an idea about becoming invisible and after some research, finds himself doing experiments by purchasing things from Melody's father's shop. He makes himself a suit and wearing it, goes to his office but is caught on camera, not yet revealing his face. Upon finding out about Griff's secret, Melody tries to encourage Griff in his work by presenting him with a 'Universe Suit' sent anonymously. Using plans from Melody, Griff builds an advanced invisibility suit to prank his tormentor, but this time his boss sees his face on camera and he gets fired from his job. That night, Tony calls a local goon and beats Griff in an alley. He returns home to retrieve his suit and police catch a bloodied Griff and later release him with a warning. It becomes apparent that the superhero, the goons he beats and his invisibility are just his imagination.

One night, when Tim goes out with Griff and Melody to an abandoned warehouse, Tim asks Melody why she is encouraging Griff, to which Melody replies that she and Griff see the world differently, and that while Griff's world is imaginary, it's what makes him special and she loves him for it. Griff overhears snippets of this conversation (due to a bad signal on the walkie-talkie) and thinks Melody believes he is a freak. Hurt over this, Griff snaps out of his fantasy and goes home to destroy the costume and all computers he was using in his imaginary world.

Later on, Griff goes to Melody's house for dinner where she realizes Griff no longer believes in his imaginary world. Soon afterwards she comes to Griff's home to ask why he's trying to act normal. When Griff tells her he's trying to grow up and now holds his superhero fantasy in disdain, she tells him he was the only one who went into her world with her and understood her in that way, and that his imagination was the reason she loved him. Heartbroken, she leaves his house and cries leaning on his door. Suddenly, she falls through the door (as she was seen trying to do earlier) and lands in Griff's room. Griff takes her into his arms and she utters, "You can believe it." They share a passionate kiss, and Griff comes to re-embrace his imaginary world.

Soon after, a package falls through the mail slot of Griff's door with Melody's name written on it. Tim is then shown walking away with his new girlfriend (Griff's former co-worker, Cecilia). Griff runs into his room to put on his invisible suit, and Melody opens the box. Inside is a note from Tim that says, "Use these to be the only one who can see Griff when he's invisible. So he doesn't have to wear the hat." The device resembles a View-Master stereoscopic toy. Griff enters unseen into the room, and when Melody holds up the device to her eyes, she can see him standing there again. They smile at each other as the film ends.

== Cast ==
- Ryan Kwanten as Griff
- Maeve Dermody as Melody
- Toby Schmitz as Tony
- Patrick Brammall as Tim
- Marshall Napier as Benson
- Heather Mitchell as Bronwyn
- Anthony Phelan as Detective Stone
- Kelly Paterniti as Gina
- David Webb as Gary
- Kate Mulvany as Cecilia
- Chan Griffin as Top Hat

== Production ==
The film is directed by Leon Ford and produced by Nicole O'Donohue. Executive producers are Jan Chapman (The Piano, Lantana, Bright Star) and Scott Meek (Velvet Goldmine).

The idea was conceived by Ford while sitting in a café watching a child playing by himself. "He was in this whole other exciting world and it looked much more exciting than the one we were in. I thought isn't it a shame that I'm not allowed to do that anymore. So I just thought what if you did have a guy who chose not to lose that side of his childhood?"

From a draft originally written in 2005, Ford and O'Donohue (Green Park Pictures) took the project to Screen Australia's Indivision Script Lab in 2008. The agency invested in Griff through its IndiVision Production Fund, and it was then up to the filmmakers to raise the rest of the $2.7 million budget.

Executive Producer Scott Meek became involved after Leon Ford asked him to read the script, which he loved. Jan Chapman became involved in March 2009 and has said in an interview that "there's something incredibly exciting and refreshing and challenging about getting a new young team just to do their first feature. When I went onto the set of Griff, it just felt alive and every single person was there wanting to their job and do their best...It's a really charming script and Leon Ford's a very talented young man."

=== Casting ===
Casting began even before financing was complete.

On casting Ryan Kwanten, best known for his role as Jason Stackhouse in True Blood, producer Nicole O'Donohue said, "I think we had a pretty good idea on Ryan's first test. It was amazing. He brought a real sensitivity to the role of Griff. He just kind of was Griff, there is no other way to say it. Ryan just brought so many layers to it straight away...the first test he did was quite a short little piece but there was a sneakiness, there was this real belief in the character. He just was Griff."

Writer/director Leon Ford said he cast Ryan Kwanten based on test tapes. "I was here in Australia and he was in L.A. so we just spoke on the phone a lot. We didn't actually meet face-to-face until rehearsal, but we just had to make the call and say, "Let's just get him and we'll work out whether we get along later."

=== Filming ===
Griff the Invisible was filmed on location in Sydney over five weeks, and was shot in and around Sydney's inner west, with Surry Hills as Griff's territory. Ford wrote it with that specific suburb in mind. Locations include Central Station, Haymarket, Hyde Park, Pyrmont and Surry Hills.

Griff the Invisible was shot using 16mm film rather than digital, an aesthetic choice.

== Reception and awards ==
Griff the Invisible received mixed to positive reviews from critics and has a score of 63% on Rotten Tomatoes based on 57 reviews with an average rating of 5.9/10.

Award	Category	Subject	Result
AACTA Awards (1st)	Best Original Screenplay	Leon Ford	Won
Neuchâtel International Fantasy; Film Festival Narcisse Award	Best Feature Film	Leon Ford	Nominated
