= Leon Ford =

Australian actor

Leon Willem Ford
- Born: 17 December 1974 (age 51); Canberra, ACT, Australia
- Known for: The Cooks; Changi; The Pacific; The Great Raid; Ten Pound Poms; Elvis
- Partner: Alice Bell

Leon Ford is an Australian actor who has appeared in many television and theatre productions. He is best known for his roles in the television series The Cooks, Changi and the telemovie Stepfather of the Bride.

== Early life ==
Ford attended Telopea Park School and Narrabundah College in Canberra, Australia.

== Career ==
Film & television

Ford portrayed 1st Lieutenant Edward 'Hillbilly' Jones in the Emmy award-winning HBO miniseries The Pacific, which follows the story of World War II Marines through different battles of the Pacific theater of war.

He has also appeared in many other television series and films including All Saints, East West 101 and McLeod's Daughters, the 2005 movie The Great Raid and voiced a character in the 2008 stop motion animated movie $9.99. He recently appeared in the joint BBC and Stan production Ten Pound Poms and Baz Luhrmann's feature film Elvis. On 9 September 2025, Ford was announced as creator and actor in ABC series Dog Park.

Stage

Stage roles include playing pious charlatan Tartuffe in the 2014 Bell Shakespeare version of Tartuffe, based on the French play originally written by Molière.

Directing/writing

In addition to acting, Ford is both a director and screenwriter. In 2010, Ford notably wrote and directed the movie Griff the Invisible, starring Ryan Kwanten as a man who is bullied by his coworkers during the day, but a superhero by night. The film premiered at the 2010 Toronto International Film Festival (TIFF), where it was well received by audiences and critics. Ford attended Binger Filmlab in 2008, where he developed short film The Mechanicals.

Author

Ford is also an accomplished author. In 2009, penned "What Doesn't Kill You", the story of a man waking up to find that, instead of the ideal life he'd been living, everything has gone horribly wrong overnight. He wakes up in the wrong house, his wife doesn't love him anymore, he no longer has a job, one of his friends betrayed him in the worst possible way and his car exploded.

== Personal life ==
Ford first met his wife Alice Bell at the Old Fitzroy Hotel in 2006 while appearing in Josh Lawson's play Shakespearealism. Alice wrote a part for him in Puberty Blues.

Ford moved from Sydney to Los Angeles in 2018 with his wife and their three children, in order for Alice to work on The Expats, a U.S. series she was the writer and creator of (produced by Nicole Kidman's Blossom Films).

== Filmography ==
=== Short film ===
Year	Title	Director	Writer	Producer	Editor
1999	The Big Date	Yes	Yes	Yes	No
2005	The Mechanicals	Yes	Yes	No	No
2006	Glitch	Yes	Yes	No	No
2007	Katoomba	Yes	Yes	No	No
2016	Young Labor	Yes	No	No	Yes

Acting roles

Year	Title	Role
2006	The Last Chip	Croupier Craig
2006	Glitch	Norton
2012	Julian	Mr Braybon
2013	Things We Do For Love	Evan

=== Feature film ===
Year	Title	Director	Writer
2010	Griff the Invisible	Yes	Yes
2023	The Portable Door	No	Yes

Acting roles

Year	Title	Role
2004	Lost Things	Gary
2005	The Great Raid	American POW at Palawan
2008	$9.99	Stanton (voice)
2010	Beneath Hill 60	Lieutenant Robert Clayton
2015	Ruben Guthrie	Dimitri
2016	The Light Between Oceans	Franz Johannes Roennfeldt
2020	Rams	De Vries
2022	Elvis	Tom Diskin

=== Television ===
Year	Title	Director	Writer	Producer	Notes
2003	Life Support	No	Yes	No	4 episodes
2010–11	Rush	No	Yes	No	3 episodes
2012	Monday Bites	Yes	Yes	No	
2012	House Husbands	No	Yes	No	Season 1, episode 8
2012–17	Offspring	No	Yes	No	10 episodes
2015	No Activity	No	Yes	No	1 episode
2018	Squinters	No	Yes	No	6 episodes
2018	Wanted	No	Yes	No	1 episode
2019–20	Upright	No	Yes	No	Also creator 8 episodes
2021–23	Love Me	No	Yes	Yes	4 episodes

Acting roles

Year	Title	Role	Notes
1996	Water Rats	First Probationer	1 episode
2001/08	All Saints	Ian Neal / Patrick Foster	2 episodes
2002	Young Lions	Josef Pozinak	1 episode
2002	McLeod's Daughters	Mick Woodland	1 episode
2002	BackBerner	Blair Fife	1 episode
2004-05	The Cooks	Dishpig	13 episodes
2005	Hex	Max Risen	2 episodes
2007	East West 101	John Duff	1 episode
2009	My Place	Vernon	1 episode
2012	Monday Bites		
2013	Offspring	Dean	1 episode
2012-14	Puberty Blues	Mr Candy	8 episodes
2014	ANZAC Girls	Major John Prior	3 episodes
2015	House of Hancock	Alan Camp	1 episode
2017-19	The Letdown	Ruben	11 episodes
2022	God's Favourite Idiot	Reverend Milton Throp	6 episodes
2023-25	Ten Pound Poms	Bill Anderson	9 episodes
2026	Dog Park	Roland	6 episodes

Miniseries

Year	Title	Role	Notes
2001	Changi	as Young Bill Dwyer	
2006	Tsunami: The Aftermath	Joe Meddler	2 episodes
2010	The Pacific	1st Lt. Edward 'Hillbilly' Jones	3 episodes
2014	The Moodys	Gavin	1 episode
2014	Devil's Playground	Brother Warren	
2015	Gallipoli	Charles Bean	

TV movies

Year	Title	Role
2004	Go Big	Lars Foster
2006	Stepfather of the Bride	Lachlan
2008	Emerald Falls	Callum Peterson
2012	The Great Raid	American POW at Palawan
2012	Mabo	Henry Reynolds
2016	Comedy Showroom: The Letdown	Ruben

== Stage ==
Year	Title	Role	Type
1998–99	Henry IV, Parts I & II	Gloucester / Mouldy Boy / Messenger / Servant	Athenaeum Theatre, Sydney Opera House, Playhouse, Canberra with Bell Shakespeare
1999	Interactive World Theatre		Ensemble Theatre
2000	A Midsummer Night's Dream	Lysander	National tour with Bell Shakespeare
2001	The Coming of Stork	Tony	Stables Theatre with Naked Theatre Company
2002	The Soldier's Tale	Soldier	Bell Shakespeare
2002	Hippolytus	Hippolytus	Government House Ballroom, Sydney with Bell Shakespeare
2002	The Credeaux Canvas	Winston	Stables Theatre, Sydney
2002	Progress	Oliver	Old Fitzroy Theatre
2002	Presence	Jake	Stables Theatre, Sydney with Griffin Theatre Company
2003	Hamlet	Hamlet	Australian tour with Bell Shakespeare
2004	Noir		Darlinghurst Theatre
2005	Top Shorts		Old Fitzroy Theatre
2006	Shakespearealism (as part of Plays: By Himself - Three Short Plays by Josh Lawson)	Ralph	Old Fitzroy Theatre with Tamarama Rock Surfers Theatre Company / Naked Theatre Company
2007	Dead Caesar	Cicero	Wharf 2 Theatre with Push Productions
2008	The Credeaux Canvas	Winston	Stables Theatre with Griffin Theatre Company
2012	Old Man	Daniel	Belvoir Theatre Company
2013	Constellations	Roland	Fairfax Studio, Melbourne with Melbourne Theatre Company
2014	Tartuffe	Tartuffe	Sydney Opera House with Bell Shakespeare
2014	Private Lives	Elyot Chase	Southbank Theatre with Melbourne Theatre Company
2016	A Flea in Her Ear	Etienne / Olympe	Sydney Opera House with Sydney Theatre Company
2016	Double Indemnity	Walter Huff	Playhouse Melbourne with Melbourne Theatre Company
2017	The Rover	Colonel Belville	Belvoir Street Theatre
2018	An Enemy of the People	Mayor Peter Stockmann	Belvoir Theatre Company
2022	Snugglepot & Cuddlepie	Mr Lizard	Adelaide Festival Centre with Canute Productions / New England Theatre Company
2023	A Little Night Music	Frederick Egerman	Hayes Theatre Co
—N/a	Rope	Philip	Marama Cabin Crew
—N/a	Macbeth	Macduff / Lennox	Melbourne Theatre Company

== Awards and nominations ==
Year	Nominated work	Award	Category	Result
2003	Hamlet	Green Room Awards	Best Male Actor in a Leading Role	Nominated
2006	The Mechanicals	St. Kilda Film Festival	Best Short Film (Comedy)	Won
2007	Katoomba	Sydney Film Festival	Best Australian Short Film (Dendy Award)	Won
2007	Katoomba	AFI Awards	Best Screenplay in a Short Film	Nominated
2008	Katoomba	St. Kilda Film Festival	Best Film	Won
2008	Katoomba	St. Kilda Film Festival	Best Director	Won
2008		IF Awards	Best Rising Talent	Won
2011	Griff the Invisible	Neuchâtel International Fantastic Film Festival	Best Feature Film	Nominated
2012	Griff the Invisible	AACTA Awards	Best Original Screenplay	Won
2015	Offspring (episode 5.10)	AWGIE Awards	Best Television Series	Nominated
2019	Day Six	AWGIE Awards	Comedy Award — Situation or Narrative	Nominated
2020	Upright	AWGIE Awards	Best Situation or Narrative Comedy Screenplay	Nominated
2020	Upright	AACTA Awards	Best Television Comedy Series	Won
2022	Love Me	AACTA Awards	Best Television Drama Series	Nominated
2022	Love Me	Logie Awards	Most Outstanding Drama Series	Nominated
2022	Love Me	Logie Awards	Most Popular Drama Program	Nominated
2023	Elvis	CinEuphoria Awards	Best Ensemble - International Competition	Nominated
