= Love You to Death (2012 film) =

Love You To Death
- Directed by: Rafeeq Ellias
- Written by: Rafeeq Ellias; Abhro Banerjee; Yuki Ellias; Pallu Newatia
- Produced by: Chiman Salva
- Starring: Yuki Ellias; Chandan Roy Sanyal; Sheeba Chaddha
- Cinematography: Rafeeq Ellias
- Edited by: Abhro Banerjee
- Music by: Ronit Chaterji
- Release date: 3 February 2012
- Country: India
- Language: Hindi

Love You To Death is a 2012 Hindi-language comedy film directed by Rafeeq Ellias, featuring Yuki Ellias, Chandan Roy Sanyal, and Sheeba Chaddha in the lead roles. The film's music was composed by Ronit Chaterji. The film was released on 3 February 2012.

== Cast ==
- Yuki Ellias
- Chandan Roy Sanyal
- Sheeba Chaddha
- Suhasini Mulay
- Kallol Banerjee
- Sohrab Ardeshir
- Chetan Sashital
- Carl Sequeira
- Leonid Kudryavtsev
- Nicholas Brown

== Critical reception ==
The film received mixed reviews from critics. Avijit Ghosh from Times of India gave it 2.5/5 stating that "LYTD is loaded with sly, witty dialogues that might have sounded great in conversations and on paper but doesn't translate into laughter on celluloid. The movie's last 20 minutes are its best. Using a live art installation as the setting for the climax and where dozens of revolvers - but only one has bullets -- circulate among the guests, makes for engrossing suspense."
