= Tim Minchin =

Australian musician, writer, actor and comedian (born 1975)

Tim Minchin AM
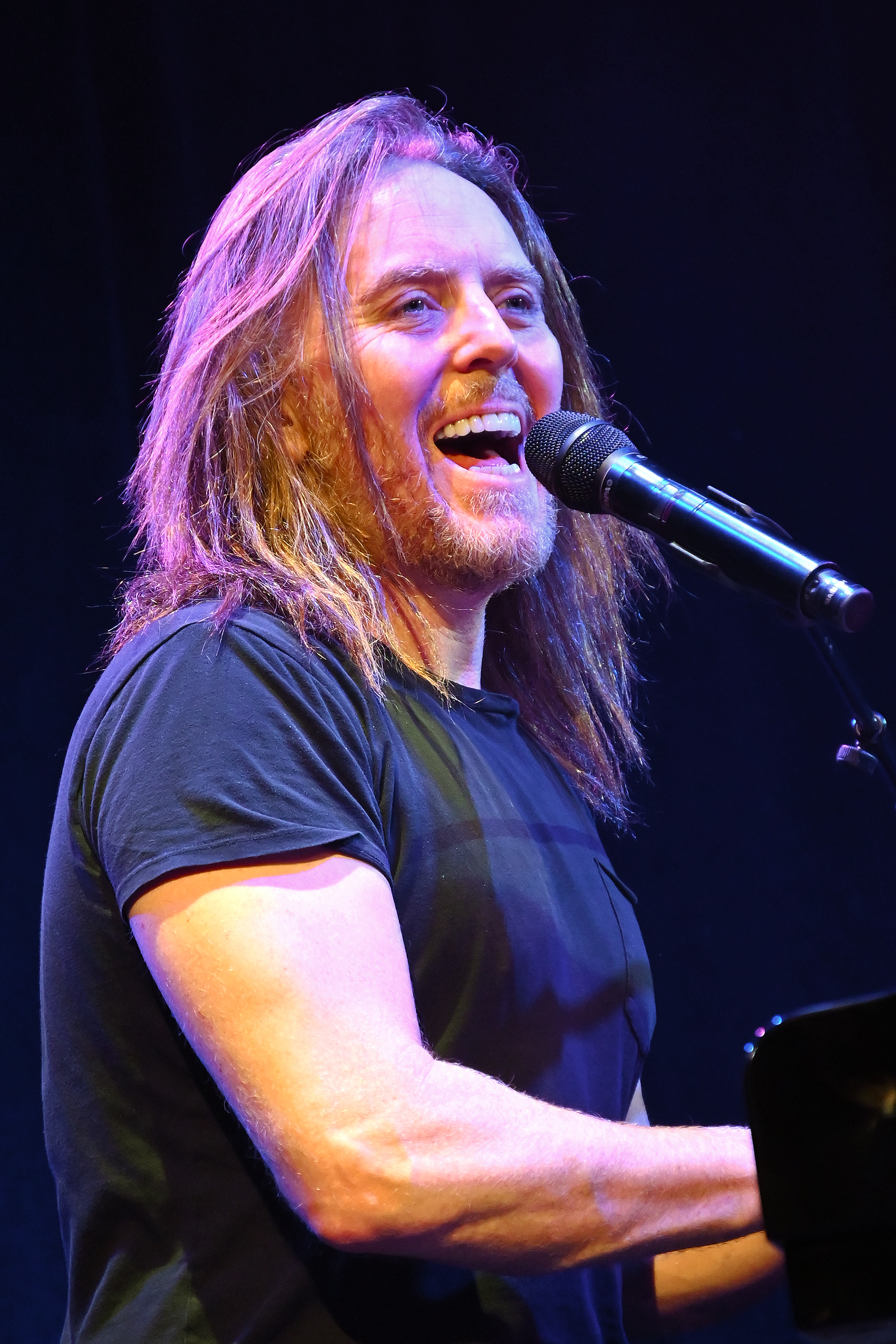
- Minchin in 2024
- Born: Timothy David Minchin; 7 October 1975 (age 51); Northampton, Northamptonshire, England
- Spouse: Sarah Minchin (m. 2001)
- Children: 2

Comedy career
- Years active: 1998–present
- Musical career
- Genre: Comedy rock
- Instruments: Vocals; piano; keyboards; accordion; guitar
- Label: BMG
- Tim Minchin's voice from the BBC programme Desert Island Discs, 6 May 2012
- Website: timminchin.com

Timothy David Minchin AM (born 7 October 1975) is a British-Australian musical comedian and actor.

Minchin has released six CDs, five DVDs, and live comedy shows that he has performed internationally. He has appeared on television in Australia, the United Kingdom, and the United States. His show Darkside launched him into the public eye, achieving critical success at the 2005 Melbourne International Comedy Festival and the 2005 Edinburgh Festival Fringe.

Minchin has a background in theatre and has appeared in various stage productions in addition to small acting roles on Australian television. A documentary film about Minchin, Rock n Roll Nerd (directed by Rhian Skirving), was released theatrically in 2008 and broadcast by ABC1 in 2009. He is the composer and lyricist of the Olivier Award-winning, Tony Award-winning and Grammy Award-nominated show Matilda the Musical and the Olivier Award-winning and Tony Award-nominated show Groundhog Day The Musical. In 2013, he played rock star Atticus Fetch on Californication and he co-wrote and starred as Lucky Flynn in the TV series Upright (2019–2022).

In 2013, the University of Western Australia awarded Minchin an honorary Doctor of Letters degree for his contribution to the arts. In 2015 he was awarded a second honorary Doctor of Letters degree from the Mountview Academy of Theatre Arts, and in 2019 he was awarded an honorary Doctorate of Performing Arts from Edith Cowan University. He was appointed a Member of the Order of Australia in the 2020 Australia Day Honours "for significant service to the performing arts, and to the community".

== Early life ==
Timothy David Minchin was born in Northampton, England on 7 October 1975, the son of Australian parents Ros and David Ellison Minchin. He holds both Australian and British citizenship, as everyone born in the UK before 1983 was automatically a citizen of the country. His father and paternal grandfather were both surgeons in Perth, and his maternal grandfather, Vic Fisher, was an Australian rules footballer who played for West Perth in the WAFL and Essendon in the VFL. He is also descended from R. E. Minchin, founding director of Adelaide Zoo. Minchin returned to Australia with his parents and was raised in Perth, alongside his elder brother, Dan, and two younger sisters, Katie and Nel.

Minchin started learning to play the piano at the age of eight, but gave it up after three years because he did not enjoy the discipline. He developed a renewed interest in the instrument after he started writing music with his brother Dan, a guitarist, but still describes himself as a "hack pianist ... a 'more you practise, the better you get' kind of guy". He was educated at Christ Church Grammar School, an independent school in Perth. He graduated from the University of Western Australia (UWA) in 1996 with a BA in English and theatre, and from the Western Australian Academy of Performing Arts in 1998 with an Advanced Diploma in contemporary music.

== Musical career ==
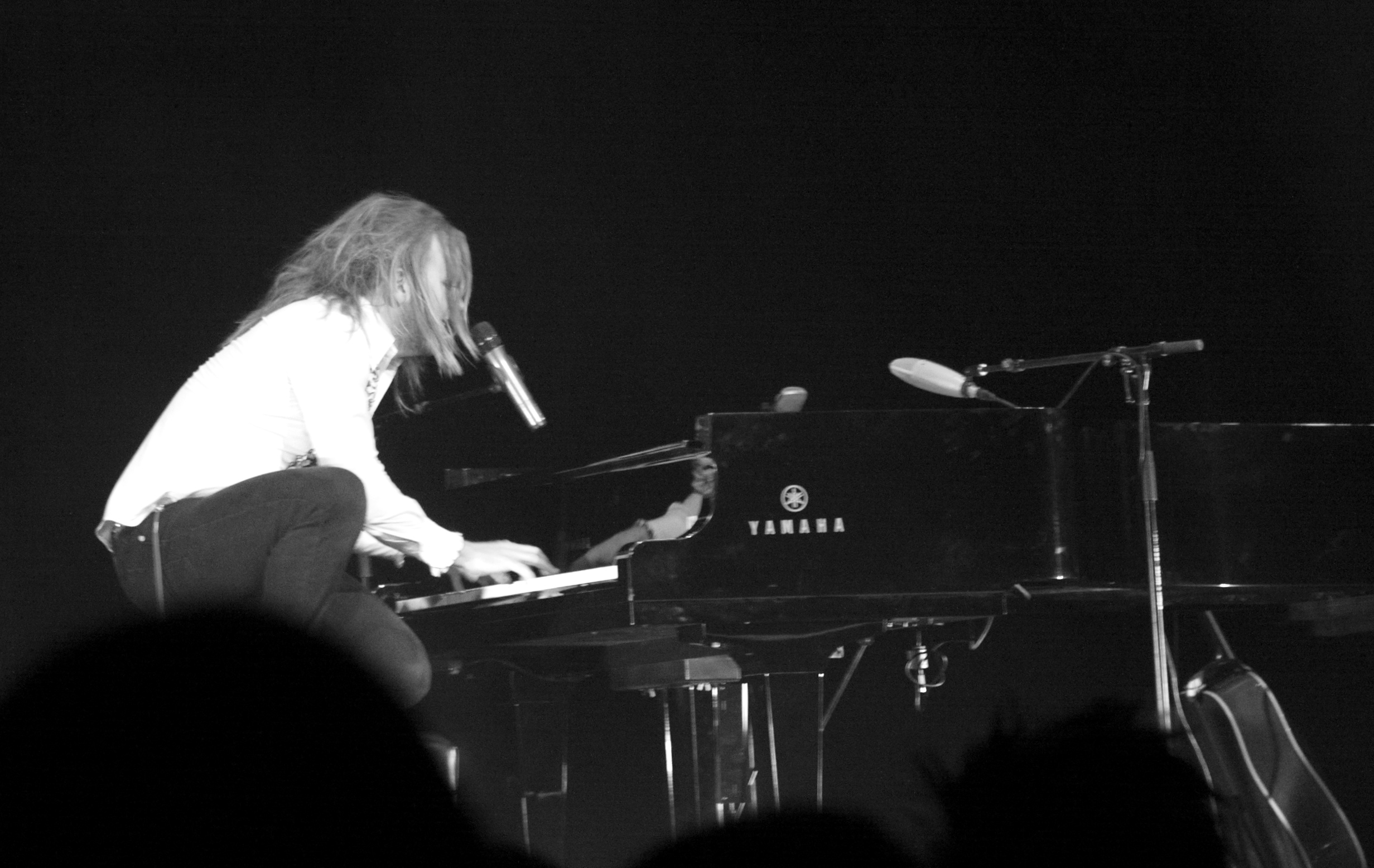
Minchin playing the piano on stage

Minchin describes his act as a "funny cabaret show" and sees himself primarily as a musician and songwriter as opposed to a comedian; he has said that his songs "just happen to be funny." His reasoning for combining the disciplines of music and comedy was revealed in one interview when he said: "I'm a good musician for a comedian and I'm a good comedian for a musician but if I had to do any of them in isolation I dunno."

He draws on his background in theatre for his distinctive onstage appearance and persona. In his performances, he typically goes barefoot with wild hair and heavy eye makeup, which is juxtaposed with a crisp suit and tails, and a grand piano. According to Minchin, he likes going barefoot in his shows because it makes him feel more comfortable. He considers the eye makeup important because while he is playing the piano he is not able to use his arms and relies on his face for expressions and gestures; the eyeliner makes his features more distinguishable for the audience. He has said that much of his look and persona is about "treading that line between mocking yourself and wanting to be an iconic figure. Mocking the ridiculousness and completely unrealistic dream of being an iconic figure."

The shows consist largely of Minchin's comedic songs and poetry, with subjects including social satire, inflatable dolls, sex fetishes, and his own failed rock star ambitions. In between songs, he performs short stand-up routines. Several of his songs deal with religion, a subject with which Minchin—an atheist and a fan of Richard Dawkins—says he is "a bit obsessed". He argues that, as one of the most powerful and influential forces in the world, religion should never be off-limits to satirists. He says that his favourite song to perform is "Peace Anthem for Palestine", which reflects his feelings about religious conflict. His comedy also deals with taboos more broadly. A prime example of this is the song "Prejudice", which parodies the power awarded to something as simple as a word. In October 2010 he was made a Distinguished Supporter of the British Humanist Association.

=== Early career (1998–2007) ===
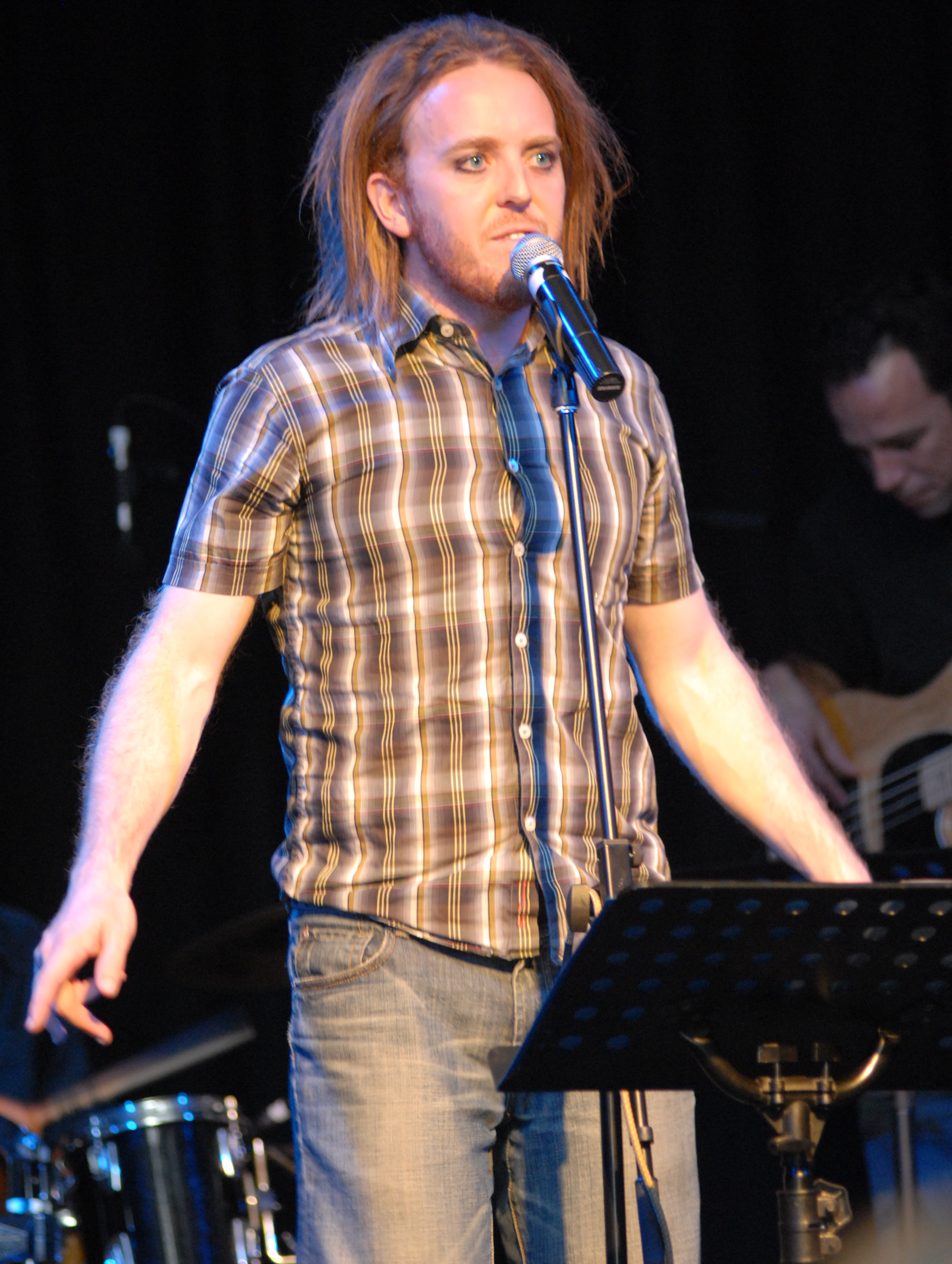
Minchin performing in April 2007

After graduating from WAAPA in 1998, Minchin started out composing music for documentaries and theatre. In 2000, he wrote and starred in the musical Pop at the Blue Room Theatre in Perth. He released a CD titled Sit with his band Timmy the Dog in 2001 but achieved little success. In 2002, after only one professional acting job, he moved from Perth to Melbourne to pursue work. Minchin struggled initially; he could not get an agent for a year and had been unable to find any acting work. While several record companies gave him encouragement, they were not sure how his music—a mixture of satirical songs and more serious pop songs—could be marketed. He decided to compile all of his humorous songs into a single live show to "get the comedy stuff off my chest" before going back to more serious music.

Minchin says he entered into comedy "naively", having never even attended a live comedy gig before performing one himself. His break-out show Darkside (co-produced by Laughing Stock Productions) achieved critical success at the 2005 Melbourne International Comedy Festival, where it won the inaugural Festival Directors' Award and attracted the notice of Karen Koren, the manager of the well-known Gilded Balloon venues. Koren backed the show's run at the Edinburgh Festival Fringe, where Minchin received the Perrier Comedy Award for Best Newcomer. His 2006 show So Rock was nominated for the Melbourne International Comedy Festival's top prize, the Barry Award, and in 2007 he was given the award for Best Alternative Comedian at the HBO US Comedy Arts Festival.

Live recordings of his 2005 and 2006 shows, Darkside and So Rock, have been released as CDs. In 2007, he released a DVD titled So Live, featuring a live recording in the Sydney Opera House Studio with material from both of his previous shows. As this DVD was only released in Australia, he released a DVD in 2008 entitled So F**king Rock Live in the UK, containing largely the same material as So Live.

=== Ready for This? (2008–2010) ===
In August 2008, Minchin debuted his third solo show, Ready for This?, at the Edinburgh Fringe and subsequently took it on tour across the UK. During the Edinburgh run, he contributed to The Guardian newspaper's podcasts, despite his new show containing a song about a Guardian critic who once gave his show a negative review. Responding to the song, which contains graphic violence, the critic laconically remarked that he had not yet had time to listen to it: "Life's too short and I've already done my bit by sitting through that show in Edinburgh."

A live recording of this at Queen Elizabeth Hall in London, was released as an album for download via iTunes on 20 July 2009. An Australian recording was released in Australia on DVD on 9 September 2009, and then as a United Kingdom release in the second half of 2010.

It was announced at the end of 2009 that one of Minchin's beat poems, "Storm", was to be made into a short animated movie. A blog was launched to accompany the film-making process, and a short trailer was released on 8 January 2010. The full movie was launched on YouTube on 7 April 2011.

In the movie, he takes on alternative medicine: "By definition alternative medicine has either not been proved to work, or been proved not to work. Do you know what they call alternative medicine that's been proved to work? Medicine."

Minchin was the subject of the winning entry, by painter Sam Leach, in the 2010 Archibald Prize, Australia's most important portraiture competition.

=== Tim Minchin and the Heritage Orchestra (2010–2012) ===
Minchin embarked on a new arena tour called Tim Minchin and the Heritage Orchestra starting at the NIA, Birmingham on Wednesday 8 December 2010. A departure from the structure of his previous live shows, his act was scaled up to be performed with the Heritage Orchestra. It contained a mixture of material, including new songs on the subject of prayer and of rationality (themes which often appear in his previous work). Minchin stated that the aim of incorporating the orchestra into his act was to create a comedy show that would not be ruined by being performed in arenas, as stated in the special features of the DVD and Blu-ray. The show toured the UK and Australia, and was filmed at the Royal Albert Hall in London for a Blu-ray and DVD that was released in November 2011.

The show also toured Australia under the title Tim Minchin vs. The Orchestras, where he performed with the city state orchestra in each location.

=== BACK tour and Apart Together album (2019–2024) ===
On 30 August 2018, Minchin announced he would be returning to touring with a new show called BACK, also billed as Old Songs, New Songs, Fuck You Songs. It marked the first time Minchin returned to touring since 2012 (with the exception of a micro tour of Los Angeles in October 2017 called Leaving LA).

The tour started in Adelaide, touring Australia and New Zealand in March and April 2019, followed by a tour of the UK in October and November 2019. The tour featured new songs such as "Fuck This", "Leaving LA", and "If This Plane Goes Down", as well as songs from his recent musical works such as "When I Grow Up" from Matilda the Musical and "Seeing You" from Groundhog Day. The show also saw Tim reveal a new band that played alongside him for the rest of the night. This band played throughout the show, performing with Minchin for songs ranging from "Cheese" (first introduced in Tim Minchin and the Heritage Orchestra), "Prejudice" and new song "I'll Take Lonely Tonight" to a modified version of "If I Didn't Have You". A new song called "15 Minutes (of Shame)" was also performed with the live band.

An Encore tour of BACK began touring in Australia in March 2020, however dates were postponed due to the COVID-19 pandemic in Australia. The tour resumed in Australia in June and July 2021, followed by an encore tour of the UK in October, November and December 2021. The recording of the final UK shows at the Shepherd's Bush Empire was broadcast to cinemas on 23 November 2022 and was released on DVD and Blu-ray on 12 December 2022.

In March 2020 it was announced that Minchin had signed a record deal with BMG and would release his debut studio album, Apart Together, in November 2020. Prior to the release of his album, Tim released music videos for the tracks Leaving LA, I'll Take Lonely Tonight, Apart Together, Airport Piano (which was filmed while he was in quarantine in Perth) and The Absence of You.

Apart Together was released on 20 November 2020, with a streamed digital concert coinciding with the full album's debut. It received mixed to positive reviews from critics. The Independent called it "crisply observed and tenderly considered.", stating that "Minchin's unswerving commitment to all that good, decent, truthful stuff is irresistible." However, iNews referred to the album as nothing more than an "hour-long vanity project...Minchin obviously has things to say about the world but he hasn't really found the right way to say them", but also admitted that "There are glimmers of great humanity and honesty, small moments of beauty. Minchin excels when he tries less hard."

In 2023, Minchin announced he will perform some informal solo concerts called An Unfunny Evening with Tim Minchin and His Piano at the Lyric Theatre, London and across the UK and Ireland on a tour, and later from October 2023 in Australia and New Zealand. Unlike his previous comedy shows, it will feature a fluid set list of songs from Apart Together, Matilda, Groundhog Day, his TV and film projects and from his early song-writing days. In June 2024 it was announced that this show would tour in North America, with two Canadian dates as well as stops in various locations around the U.S.

On 3 December 2024, Minchin announced that he and his band will perform five intimate shows to celebrate the opening of the Foundry Theatre at the Sydney Lyric from 11 to 15 February 2025, titled First at the Foundry.

=== Songs The World Will Never Hear tour and Time Machine (2025–) ===
To celebrate 20 years since his first Edinburgh Festival shows in 2005, Minchin toured the UK with Songs The World Will Never Hear: Celebrating 20 years of FKN Hardcore Rock N Roll Nerding. On July 25, 2025, the album Time Machine was released.

On November 2, 2025, Minchin delivered an address to the Art of Tax Reform Summit 2025 in NSW, Australia, articulating the creative process behind the development of Play It Safe, a song commissioned for the 50th anniversary of the Sydney Opera House , and addressing the need for broader, "riskier" support for the arts in Australia and internationally .

In December 2025, Minchin wrote and composed the song "I'm Not Remarkable", which was featured in an Apple short film of the same name released to celebrate the International Day of Persons with Disabilities. The film won the Outstanding Commercial category at the 78th Primetime Creative Arts Emmy Awards.

== Television and radio ==
Minchin has made appearances on Australian TV shows, including the ABC's Spicks and Specks and The Sideshow. He has also made appearances on Network Ten's panel shows Good News Week (February 2010) and Talkin' 'Bout Your Generation (March 2010).

Minchin has appeared on several British radio and television shows, including the BBC's Never Mind the Buzzcocks (four times, once as guest host), BBC Radio 4's Mark Watson Makes the World Substantially Better, and two specials on BBC Radio 2. He often performs on his TV appearances, such as his spots on Friday Night with Jonathan Ross, first in October 2009 where he performed a specially written song entitled "Five Poofs and Two Pianos", a parody of the show's house band, 4 Poofs and a Piano, and again in July 2010 when he performed Song For Wossy. Minchin also appeared as a special guest on the 2009 edition of The Big Fat Quiz of the Year, performing a song written for the show ("It's Like 1984") in reference to a question regarding Google Street View. On Saturday 13 August 2011, Minchin hosted Prom 40, the first BBC Comedy Promenade Concert at the Royal Albert Hall. He appeared on Desert Island Discs on 6 May 2012.

A heavily cut-down version of the show released on DVD as So F**king Rock Live has aired several times on British TV channel E4, first on 23 July 2009. It aired at the start of 2011, forming E4's New Year's coverage.

On 8 May 2010, Minchin's musical sitcom pilot Strings was broadcast on BBC Radio 2; it was well received, but he decided against creating a full series.

In December 2011, Minchin performed a specially written song called "Woody Allen Jesus" on The Jonathan Ross Show. However, despite the show's producers and ITV's lawyers approving the composition for broadcast, it was removed at the last minute. Responding on his blog, Minchin stated: "Someone got nervous and sent the tape to ITV's director of television, Peter Fincham. And Peter Fincham demanded that I be cut from the show. He did this because he's scared of the ranty, shit-stirring, right-wing press, and of the small minority of Brits who believe they have a right to go through life protected from anything that challenges them in any way."

In August 2012, Minchin appeared on Chain Reaction, first being interviewed by Derren Brown, and later interviewing Caitlin Moran.

In 2013, Minchin played rock star Atticus Fetch in Californication.

In 2015, Minchin guest starred in the Australian comedy television series, No Activity.

In 2015, Minchin played the role of Smasher in the Australian TV mini series The Secret River.

In 2018, Minchin acted in Squinters, an ABC comedy.

In 2019, Minchin starred as Lucky Flynn in the TV series Upright (which he also co-wrote), alongside Milly Alcock as Meg. The series appeared on Fox Showcase in Australia and Sky Atlantic in the UK and in 2022, the second season was released.

In 2020, Minchin performed the opening and closing songs for the BAFTA awards ceremony, which took place behind closed doors. The opening number was written specifically for the event and the latter was a version of his song "Carry You", which he wrote for his TV series Upright. The BBC received widespread condemnation for cutting the final song, which had been prerecorded, short for timing purposes.

In an interview with Forbes in August 2020, Minchin revealed that while living and working in Los Angeles, he had been pitched a semi-autobiographical sitcom. "There was a project that a writer pitched to Warner Bros., which was a vehicle for me along the lines of a Seinfeld, where there was a character called Tim, who was a musical comedian had moved to LA from London. He was a big star in London, but no one cared about him in LA."

In 2023, Minchin portrayed Darius Cracksworth in the Australian series The Artful Dodger. The series is a sequel to the Charles Dickens novel Oliver Twist (1838).

In 2024, Minchin wrote a song for the Netflix series Eric called "Good Day Sunshine", a theme song for a fictional show in the series.

== Stage career ==
=== Early acting roles ===
Minchin's background is in theatre and he has appeared in various stage productions. He played the title role in the 2006 Perth Theatre Company production of Amadeus, a fictional play about the downfall of Mozart at the hands of the reigning court composer, a character based on and named after Antonio Salieri. His other stage acting roles have included the title role in the 2004 Perth Theatre Company / Hoopla production of Hamlet, and The Writer in the original PTC production of Reg Cribb's The Return. He has also acted for the Australian Shakespeare Company (Twelfth Night), the Black Swan Theatre Company (Così, One Destiny), and in various other plays, short films, and television commercials. Roles from his days in musical theatre include Don Quixote in Man of La Mancha and Pontius Pilate (and understudying Judas Iscariot twice) in Jesus Christ Superstar. He has also appeared playing small parts on the ABC telemovie Loot and on the show Comedy Inc..

=== Later acting roles ===
Minchin was cast in the role of Judas in the 2012 UK and Ireland arena tour of the Tim Rice and Andrew Lloyd Webber rock opera Jesus Christ Superstar. The tour extended into various other countries due to popular demand, with Minchin reprising the role in the world, with a filmed version being released in Autumn 2012. The filmed version, much to Minchin's annoyance, had his voice autotuned. The production toured Australia from May to July 2013, before returning to the UK and Ireland in Autumn 2013.

Minchin made his Sydney Theatre Company debut in 2013 in Tom Stoppard's Rosencrantz and Guildenstern Are Dead alongside Toby Schmitz.

On 23 April 2016, Minchin appeared in Shakespeare Live! From The RSC at the Royal Shakespeare Theatre in Stratford-upon-Avon (which was also broadcast live on BBC Two) celebrating the birthday and 400 years since the death of William Shakespeare. He appeared as himself in the 'To be, or not to be' sketch alongside Paapa Essiedu, Benedict Cumberbatch, Harriet Walter, David Tennant (who also hosted the event with Catherine Tate), Rory Kinnear, Ian McKellen, Judi Dench and Charles, Prince of Wales (who was in attendance with Camilla, Duchess of Cornwall).

In November 2026, the Sydney Theatre Company announced a 2027 production of A Christmas Carol, starring Minchin as Ebenezer Scrooge. The play is schedule to run from 11 November to 26 December.

=== Musical theatre (composer and lyricist) ===
==== Matilda the Musical ====
In 2008, Minchin was commissioned by the Royal Shakespeare Company to write the music and lyrics for Matilda the Musical, adapted by Dennis Kelly and based on the novel of the same name by Roald Dahl. It was revealed that Minchin had coincidentally already tried to obtain permission from the Dahl estate to write a musical version of the book in the early 2000s for youth theatre in Australia. The director Matthew Warchus approached Minchin after seeing his Ready for This? tour and hearing his song White Wine in the Sun. The musical premiered at the Courtyard Theatre in Stratford-upon-Avon, running from 9 November 2010 to 30 January 2011, and it began its West End run at the Cambridge Theatre on 25 October 2011 to great critical acclaim, winning a record-breaking 7 Laurence Olivier Awards including Best New Musical. In 2013, Matilda opened on Broadway at the Shubert Theatre, and earned 12 Tony Award nominations, winning 4. The musical has subsequently been presented worldwide winning numerous awards.

==== Groundhog Day ====
In 2015, it was announced Minchin had teamed up again with director Matthew Warchus and the creative team from Matilda to write the music and lyrics for the new stage musical Groundhog Day based on the 1993 film of the same name alongside Danny Rubin as book writer (who also co-wrote the movie with Harold Ramis) The musical had its premiere at The Old Vic in 2016, before transferring to the August Wilson Theatre on Broadway. Groundhog Day began previews in July 2016, with a scheduled run until 19 September 2016. The musical ran on Broadway from 16 March 2017 in previews, officially on 17 April 2017 and closed on 17 September 2017 after 176 performances and 31 previews. The production was revived at The Old Vic from 20 May to 12 August 2023.

==== Other musicals ====
Prior to Matilda, Minchin had written the music and lyrics for numerous musicals including adaptations of William Shakespeare's The Merchant of Venice and Love's Labour's Lost and Bertolt Brecht's Mother Courage and Her Children as well as original musicals; This Blasted Earth (with a book by Toby Schmitz) for Tamarama Rock Surfers in 2004 and Somewhere...The Magical Musical of Penrith (with a book by Kate Mulvany) for Q Theatre in Penrith in 2005.

Minchin expressed interest in the idea of adapting the Neil Gaiman novel and film Stardust into a stage musical. He also revealed that he was working on a new biographical musical with a British playwright, revealing plans to open in Australia.

== Film ==
Minchin played the role of Tom in the contemporary family drama Two Fists, One Heart, released 19 March 2009. He also wrote the song "Drowned" for the film's soundtrack.

In 2013, Minchin moved with his family to Los Angeles so that he could work on Larrikins, a planned Australian-themed animated musical film for DreamWorks Animation, which he wrote the songs for and was set to co-direct with Chris Miller. The film was set to have an all-star Australian voice cast, headed by Hugh Jackman. However, in March 2017, the project was cancelled, possibly in a decision by Comcast, who had bought DreamWorks Animation a year earlier. Minchin called the outcome "unbearable", noting that he had turned down many projects during those four years, and that "there were 120 people working on that film."

Minchin co-starred as Friar Tuck in the 2018 American film Robin Hood.

In 2021 his voiceover work included Busker K. Bushy, Esq. in Peter Rabbit 2: The Runaway and Pretty Boy in Back to the Outback which he also wrote and performed the single "Beautiful Ugly" with Evie Irie.

In 2021, it was announced that a feature film adaptation of Matilda the Musical will be released for Netflix, TriStar Pictures and Working Title Films, with Minchin writing additional music and songs, Dennis Kelly writing the screenplay and will be directed by Matthew Warchus. The film was released on 25 November 2022 in the UK and Ireland and was released on 25 December 2022 on Netflix across the rest of the world.

In May 2026, it was revealed that Minchin is writing the original songs for the new remake of Chitty Chitty Bang Bang, also directed by Warchus with a screenplay by Enda Walsh for Eon Productions and Amazon MGM Studios.

== Atheism and skepticism ==
During his 2009 interview for Australian Skeptics' podcast The Skeptic Zone, Minchin addressed his performance style as one that allows bringing up issues that can be upsetting or judgemental to others, such as the "moral hypocrisy about the idea that the Bible is perfect, the only place that you need to go to for your moral guidance ... and about, obviously, prejudice in the church, its role in ostracising homosexuals ... your defences are down when you're laughing as well and it's couched in music. All I'm doing is making things consumable that are otherwise difficult to consume."

As the son and grandson of medical surgeons, Minchin addressed alternative medicine claims by relating that unbiased tests for efficacy are the key:

You're in such a strong position when you understand the scientific process because all you say is, "Do you understand that the great breakthrough of humanity was figuring out how to make decisions about things whilst discarding human foibles? So, anecdotal evidence involves all your subjectivity—if we do it like this we don't have that anymore. Why, surely do you understand how powerful that is?" And if they don't, then that's what you have to explain to them. It's an extremely powerful thing and a very basic thing.

Minchin further explained his skeptical outlook:

I've always been an atheist; I've always been an empiricist really. I've never believed in ghosts or psychics or anything like that 'cause it's quite simple—you don't have to know much to go, "Really?" Or, to just apply Occam's Razor, to go, "Is it more likely that souls do circus tricks, or more likely that they're talking to dead people? And if the latter, by what process? What do you mean talking to dead people? Aren't their voice boxes rotten? So without a voice box, how do they talk, and by what means?" It doesn't take much to be skeptical about that. But really understanding, as I'm still learning, why science is powerful, is a new step towards being boring at dinner parties.

When asked if he thought the universe is full of life, Minchin summarised: "The chances of this happening might be one in infinity. Put it this way: the chance that there being intelligent alien life are, for me, infinitely higher than the chance there being a creator god."

In an interview with Independent Investigations Group member John Rael, Minchin explains that what upsets him most about paranormal beliefs is "special pleading" by people who say vague things such as "there is no harm in it". Minchin states that there is very little harm in something like reiki, but asks "where do you draw the line?" when it comes to needing real evidence if a therapy works or not. He states that he is an atheist as well as a sceptic, and cannot understand how someone can be a sceptic and still be religious. "If you apply doubt to anything ... the whole religion thing is obviously a fantasy."

== Protest songs ==
=== "Come Home (Cardinal Pell)" ===
In 2016, during the course of Australia's Royal Commission into Institutional Responses to Child Sexual Abuse Minchin wrote "Come Home (Cardinal Pell)", which criticised Cardinal George Pell. Launched on Channel Ten's The Project, it received wide publicity but was highly controversial. Immediately after its debut, journalist Steve Price criticised the piece, describing it as "personal abuse" of Pell. Liam Viney described it as being a protest song and analysed its mechanics. Minchin later described it as "the most overt piece of activism I've done".

The royal commission had been called to investigate how institutions like schools, churches, and government organisations have responded to allegations and instances of child sexual abuse. When the royal commissioner granted the 74-year-old George Pell permission to appear as a witness via video link from Rome, rather than attend in person as he had previously done, Minchin wrote the song "Come Home (Cardinal Pell)". In response, a statement from Pell's office said the cardinal had led the battle against child abuse in the church for 20 years. Attorney General George Brandis told ABC TV that giving evidence by video was "not at all unusual".

The song helped fund journeys to Rome for victims of sex abuse so they could watch the cardinal deliver his evidence, with a GoFundMe account set up by The Project hosts Meshel Laurie and Gorgi Coghlan. The ABC 7.30 programme noted on 17 February 2016: "the song's going viral with almost 200,000 YouTube views" but "supporters of Cardinal Pell say it's verbal abuse set to music." Jesuit human rights lawyer Frank Brennan said it risked endangering the integrity of the royal commission. Conservative columnist Andrew Bolt described the song as a "hymn of hatred".

"Come Home (Cardinal Pell)" reached No. 11 on the Australian Singles Chart, for the week of 20 February 2016. Later, it was nominated for APRA's Song of the Year, and Kate Miller-Heidke performed the song at the APRA Music Awards ceremony.

=== "I Still Call Australia Homophobic" ===
In 2017, during the Australian Marriage Law Postal Survey Minchin sang "I Still Call Australia Homophobic" – a re-work of Peter Allen's, "I Still Call Australia Home" – that refers to those supporting the "No" case as homophobic and "bigoted cunts". The Minchin video was shown on the ABC Insiders TV current affairs program. He was criticised by politicians Tony Abbott and Mitch Fifield.

== Personal life ==
Minchin and his wife Sarah, whom he married in 2001 and with whom he has a daughter and a son, returned to Australia from Los Angeles in December 2017. They currently live in Sydney.

Minchin supports the Fremantle Football Club in the AFL and named his dog Sonny after star player Michael "Sonny" Walters.

In 2013, the University of Western Australia awarded Minchin an honorary Doctor of Letters degree for his contribution to the arts, recognising his outstanding achievements and worldwide acclaim as a composer, lyricist, actor, writer, and comedian. In 2015, he was awarded a second honorary Doctor of Letters degree from Mountview Academy of Theatre Arts. In 2019, Minchin was awarded a third honorary doctorate for his contribution to the arts by the Western Australian Academy of Performing Arts. He was appointed a Member of the Order of Australia in the 2020 Australia Day Honours. Minchin is patron and supporter of the charities WA Youth Theatre Company, The Prince's Foundation for Children and the Arts, and Roald Dahl's Marvellous Children's Charity.

== Discography ==
=== Albums ===
==== Studio albums ====
Title	Details	Peak chart positions	
Title	Details	AUS	UK
Sit (with Timmy the Dog)	Released: 2001	—	—
Apart Together	Released: 20 November 2020; Label: BMG	3	27
Time Machine	Released: 25 July 2025; Label: BMG	4	11

==== Live albums ====
List of live albums released
Darkside	Released: 2005
So Rock	Released: 2006
Ready for This?	Released: 1 February 2009; Label: Tim Minchin, Laughing Stock Productions; Format: Digital download
Live at the O2	Released: 2010
Tim Minchin and the Heritage Orchestra	Released: 4 April 2011; Label: Laughing Stock Productions; Format: Digital download
So Fucking Rock (adapted from the 2008 DVD So Fucking Rock Live)	Released: 29 November 2013; Label: Tim Minchin; Format: Digital download
Apart Together (live at Trackdown Studio)	Released: 17 November 2023; Label: Navel, BMG; Format: Digital download

=== Singles ===
List of singles
Title	Year	Peak chart positions	Album
Title	Year	AUS	Album
"Drowned"	2008	–	Two Fists One Heart
"White Wine in the Sun"	2009	–	Ready for This?
"The Pope Song"	2010	–	
"The Fence"	2011	–	
"White Wine in the Sun" (re-release)	2012	–	
"So Long (As We Are Together)"	2013	–	
"Come Home (Cardinal Pell)"	2016	11	
"15 Minutes"	2019	–	
"Leaving LA"	2020	–	Apart Together
"I'll Take Lonely Tonight"	2020	–	Apart Together
"Apart Together"	2020	–	Apart Together
"Airport Piano"	2020	–	Apart Together
"The Absence of You"	2020	–	Apart Together
"Beautiful Ugly" (featuring Evie Irie) (Tim Minchin featuring Evie Irie)	2021	–	Back to the Outback (soundtrack)
"The Aeroplane"	2022	–	
"Play It Safe" (Sydney Opera House 50th Anniversary)	2023	–	
"Good Day Sunshine" (The Good Day Sunshine Band, Tim Minchin)	2024	–	From the Netflix Series 'Eric'
"Ruby"	2025		Time Machine
"The Song of the Masochist"	2025		Time Machine
"I Wouldn't Like You"	2025		Time Machine
"The Cat in the Hat Theme Song"(FITZ, Tim Minchin, Bill Hader)	2026	–	The Cat in the Hat (soundtrack)

=== As featured artist ===
List of singles released as featured artist, with year released and album details shown
Title	Year	Album
"Housefyre" (Briggs featuring Tim Minchin)	2020	Briggs for PM

=== Compilations ===
- Laugh-a-poolooza (featured artist) (2005)
- "So Long (As We Are Together)" Californication Season 6 Soundtrack (2013)
- "Carry You" (with Missy Higgins) Music from the Home Front (2020)

=== DVD ===
- So Live (2007) Australian DVD
- So F**king Rock Live (also known as So Fucking Rock Live) (11 October 2008)
- Ready for This?, three DVD releases (2009, 2010, 2011)
- Tim Minchin and the Heritage Orchestra (14 November 2011)
- Back – Live (2022)

== Filmography ==
=== Film ===
Year	Title	Role	Notes	Ref
2008	Rock'n'roll Nerd: The Tim Minchin Story	Self	Documentary	
2008	Two Fists, One Heart	Tom	Also performer/writer of original song "Drowned"	
2010	The Lost Thing	The Boy	Voice, short film (Oscar winner for Best Animated Short Film)	
2011	Storm	Narrator	Also writer, poem set to an animated short film	
2016	Matilda & Me	Self	Documentary, directed by his sister Nel Minchin and Rhian Skirving	
2018	Robin Hood	Friar Tuck		
2021	Peter Rabbit 2: The Runaway	Busker K. Bushy, Esq.	Voice role	
2021	Back to the Outback	Pretty Boy	Voice role, also performer/writer of original song "Beautiful/Ugly"	
2022	Matilda the Musical	—N/a	Composer and lyricist. Based on the original 2010 stage musical	
2023	Scarygirl	Chihoohoo	Voice role	
2026	The Cat in the Hat	—N/a	Composer/writer of "The Cat in the Hat Theme Song", also performer alongside FITZ and Bill Hader	
2026	Pickpockets			

=== Television ===
Year	Title	Role	Notes	Ref
2013	Californication	Atticus Fetch	Recurring character, 10 episodes	
2013	88 Keys	Charlie	Pilot	
2015	The Secret River	Smasher Sullivan		
2015	No Activity	Jacob	Guest role, 2 episodes	
2018	Squinters	Paul	Main role, series 1	
2019–2022	Upright	Lucky Flynn	Also creator, writer, composer, executive producer, and director of 1 episode	
2023–present	The Artful Dodger	Darius Cracksworth		
2024	Eric	—N/a	Composer of theme song to fictional show "Good Day Sunshine"	
2025	Play School	Self	Appears in episode "Clever Creatives"; reads and performs "When I Grow Up" from Matilda and the illustrated book	
2025	The Horne Section TV Show	Self	Cameo appearance, series 2 episode 3 "The Cancellation"	
2025	Strife	Professor Boyd	Guest role, season 2 episode 7 "Sometimes Always"	

=== Commercials ===
Year	Title	Role	Notes	Ref
2023	Play It Safe (Sydney Opera House)	Self	Composer of song "Play It Safe". Directed by Kim Gehrig	
2025	I'm Not Remarkable (Apple)	—N/a	Composer of song "I'm Not Remarkable". Directed by Kim Gehrig	

=== Theatre ===
==== As actor ====
Year	Title	Role	Venue
2006	Amadeus	Wolfgang Amadeus Mozart	Perth Theatre Company
2012	Jesus Christ Superstar	Judas Iscariot	UK Arena Tour
2013	Jesus Christ Superstar	Judas Iscariot	Australian Arena Tour
2013	Rosencrantz and Guildenstern Are Dead	Rosencrantz	Sydney Theatre Company
2013	Jesus Christ Superstar	Judas Iscariot	UK Arena Tour
2016	Shakespeare Live! From The RSC	Himself ('To be, or not to be' sketch)	Royal Shakespeare Theatre, Stratford-upon-Avon
2027	A Christmas Carol	Ebenezer Scrooge	Sydney Theatre Company

==== As composer/lyricist ====
- This Blasted Earth (2004)
- Somewhere...The Magical Musical of Penrith (2005)
- Matilda the Musical (2010)
- Groundhog Day (2016)

== Tours ==
- So Rock (2007–8)
- Ready for This? (2008–9)
- Tim Minchin and the Heritage Orchestra/Tim Minchin vs. The Orchestras (2010–11)
- Back (2019–21)
- An Unfunny Evening with Tim Minchin and His Piano (2023–24)
- Songs The World Will Never Hear (2025)

== Bibliography ==
Year	Title	Notes	Ref
2014	Storm	Adapted from the 2011 short film of the same name, illustrated by DC Turner & Tracy King	
2017	When I Grow Up	Adapted from the 2011 song of the same name, illustrated by Steve Antony	
2022	Sometimes You Have to be a Little Bit Naughty	Adapted from the 2011 song "Naughty" from Matilda, illustrated by Steve Antony	
2024	You Don’t Have to Have a Dream (Advice for the Incrementally Ambitious)	Collection of commencement addresses by Minchin (University of Western Australia, Mountview Academy of Theatre Arts, Western Australian Academy of Performing Arts)	

== Awards and nominations ==
=== APRA Awards ===
The APRA Awards are presented annually from 1982 by the Australasian Performing Right Association (APRA), "honouring composers and songwriters". They commenced in 1982.

Year	Nominee / work	Award	Result	Ref.
2017	"Come Home (Cardinal Pell)"	Song of the Year	Nominated	
2020	"Carry You" by Missy Higgins	Best Original Song Composed for the Screen	Nominated	
2021	"Carry You" by Missy Higgins	Song of the Year	Nominated	
2021	"I'll Take Lonely Tonight"	Song of the Year	Shortlisted	
2022	"The Absence of You"	Song of the Year	Shortlisted	

=== ARIA Music Awards ===
The ARIA Music Awards are a set of annual ceremonies presented by Australian Recording Industry Association (ARIA), which recognise excellence, innovation, and achievement across all genres of the music of Australia. They commenced in 1987.

Year	Nominee / work	Award	Result	Ref.
2011	Tim Minchin & the Heritage Orchestra	Best Comedy Release	Nominated	

=== Environmental Music Prize ===
The Environmental Music Prize is a quest to find a theme song to inspire action on climate and conservation. It commenced in 2022.

Year	Nominee / work	Award	Result	Ref.
2022	"Housefyre" (with Briggs)	Environmental Music Prize	Nominated	

=== Emmy Awards ===
Year	Nominee / work	Award	Result	Ref.
2026	I'm Not Remarkable (Apple)	Primetime Emmy Award for Outstanding Commercial	Won	

=== Grammy Awards ===
Year	Nominee / work	Award	Result	Ref.
2013	Matilda: The Musical	Grammy Award for Best Musical Theater Album	Nominated	

=== Olivier Awards ===
Year	Nominee / work	Award	Result	Ref.
2012	Matilda The Musical	Best New Musical	Won	
2017	Groundhog Day The Musical	Best New Musical	Won	

=== Tony Awards ===
Year	Nominee / work	Award	Result	Ref.
2013	Matilda The Musical	Best Original Score	Nominated	
2013	Matilda The Musical	Best Musical	Nominated	
2017	Groundhog Day The Musical	Best Original Score	Nominated	
2017	Groundhog Day The Musical	Best Musical	Nominated	

=== Other theatre and miscellaneous awards ===
- 2005 Melbourne International Comedy Festival Directors' Choice Award for Dark Side
- 2005 Edinburgh Festival Fringe Perrier Comedy Award, Best Newcomer
- 2005 Melbourne International Comedy Festival, The Groggy Squirrel Critics' Award
- 2007 U.S. Comedy Arts Festival, Best Alternative Act
- 2009 Helpmann Award for Best Comedy Performer for Tim Minchin – Ready For This?
- 2009 Green Room Awards, Cabaret: Best Original Songs
- 2009 Green Room Awards, Cabaret: Best Artiste
- 2010 Chortle Awards, Best Music or Variety Act
- 2011 Helpmann Award for Best New Australian Work for Tim Minchin Vs Sydney Symphony
- 2012 Helpmann Award for Best Comedy Performer for Tim Minchin vs The Orchestras Round II
- 2012 Ockham Award for Best Skeptic Video for Storm
- 2013 What's On Stage Awards, The W&P Longreach Best Supporting Actor in a Musical for Jesus Christ Superstar
- 2016 Logie Award, Most Outstanding Supporting Actor for The Secret River (ABC)
- 2016 Helpmann Award for Best Original Score for Matilda the Musical
- 2017 Orry-Kelly Award
- 2019 Helpmann Award for Best Australian Contemporary Concert for Tim Minchin: Back
- 2021 Richard Dawkins Award

== See also ==
- List of barefooters
