= Darkside (Tim Minchin album) =

Live album by Tim Minchin
- Released: 2005
- Recorded: 2005
- Genre: Comedy
- Length: 1:05:32

Tim Minchin chronology
Darkside (2005)	So Rock (2006)

Darkside is the first solo comedy album released by the Australian musical comedian Tim Minchin. It was recorded during Minchin's show at the Spiegeltent in Melbourne during 2005. It contains early versions of some of the songs Minchin still performs now, such as "Inflatable You", "Rock N Roll Nerd", and the title song "Dark Side".

The show and particularly the song "Rock N Roll Nerd" are described as "kinda biographical" by Minchin, as they tell of his dreams of being a rock star and how he failed to take himself seriously.

== Track listing ==
No.	Title	Length
1.	"Introductory Song"	1:50
2.	"Hello"	3:14
3.	"Inflatable You"	5:52
4.	"Sick"	3:52
5.	"Rock 'n' Roll Nerd"	5:34
6.	"Rich"	2:41
7.	"Mitsubishi Colt"	5:09
8.	"Peace Anthem for Palestine"	4:33
9.	"Angry (Feet)"	5:41
10.	"Ten Foot Cock and a Few Hundred Virgins"	4:42
11.	"Nothing Can Stop Us Now"	2:47
12.	"Canvas Bags"	3:38
13.	"Dark Side"	8:06
14.	"Not Perfect"	7:07
15.	"Second Encore"	0:38

== Reception ==
Scotland On Sunday described the show as "a mix of satirical song, bleak humour and demon piano-playing" when assessing the show's performance at the Edinburgh Festival Fringe in 2005. Chortle said of the show that Minchin is "such a brilliant virtuoso pianist" and also "a bright, quirky and hugely entertaining comedian".

A reviewer for the Metro newspaper said that Minchin's strengths lie in the "inventive detail and witty wordplay" of his songs.

== Notes ==
"Inflatable You" features a section which takes direct inspiration from The Beatles' "Don't Let Me Down". "Rock N Roll Nerd" finishes on a tune similar to Queen's "Seven Seas of Rhye", and then a chord sequence similar to the starting chords in Led Zeppelin's "Stairway to Heaven" (in reference to one of the song's lyrics). In "Mitsubishi Colt," after being compared to Elton John, Minchin completes the song with a chord progression based on "Song for Guy." The song "Dark Side" contains a quick reference of Beethoven's "Für Elise" and another to Pearl Jam's "Jeremy".
