= Two Fists, One Heart =

- Theatrical release poster
- Directed by: Shawn Seet
- Written by: Rai Fazio
- Produced by: David Elfick
- Starring: Daniel Amalm; Ennio Fantastichini; Jessica Marais; Tim Minchin
- Cinematography: Hugh Miller
- Edited by: Deborah Peart; Milena Romanin
- Distributed by: Buena Vista International
- Release dates: 2008 (AFI Film Fest); 19 March 2009 (Australia)
- Running time: 105 minutes
- Country: Australia
- Languages: English; Italian
- Budget: $8.5 million
- Box office: $305,000

Two Fists, One Heart is a 2008 Australian drama film directed by Shawn Seet and written by Rai Fazio, and is based on Fazio's own life growing up. The film is set and was shot in Perth, Western Australia. The film follows Anthony Argo, an Italian Australian boxer whose Sicilian father/trainer wants Anthony to pursue boxing but he forsakes it when he meets Kate and perceives differently than his father the violence in the sport. She is a girl from the other side of the tracks. But Anthony reconsiders when his father's boxing student quits; Anthony begins to train much more than before in preparation for the biggest fight of his life.

== Cast ==
- Daniel Amalm as Anthony Argo
- Ennio Fantastichini as Anthony's father Joe Argo
- Jessica Marais as Kate
- Rai Fazio as Nico
- Tim Minchin as Kate's brother Tom
- Paul Pantano as Theo
- Nicole Trunfio as Jessica
- Sam Greco as Mick
- Lindsay Evergreen as Kate's ex Rudy
- Costas Kilias as Costa Akidis

== Reception ==
Cinema Autopsy awarded the film 2.5 stars. The film was heavily criticized in the article I'm Here to Save Screen Australia Time and Money, and Screen Australia's CEO Ruth Harley expressed disappointment in the article "Screen Aus reviews Two Fists Failure".

== Budget and Box Office ==
Two Fists, One Heart cost $8,500,000 (which included a $4 million investment from Screen Australia) and made $305,300.

== See also ==
- Cinema of Australia
