= The Pope Song =

2010 song by Tim Minchin

Single by Tim Minchin
- Written: 2010
- Released: September 12, 2010
- Genre: Comedy
- Length: 2:08
- Songwriter: Tim Minchin

"The Pope Song" is a song written by Tim Minchin in 2010. The song is a response to the allegations that Pope Benedict XVI protected priests and other church officials who were accused of child molestation. The song caused controversy due to its religious themes and use of profanity.

== Production ==
Tim Minchin’s rationale behind including swear words in The Pope Song

"And if you don't like the swearing this motherfucker forced from me
And reckon it shows moral or intellectual paucity
Then fuck you motherfucker, this is language one employs
When one is fucking cross about fuckers fucking boys"

— The Pope Song (2010)

The song was inspired by both Pope Benedict's 2010 visit to the UK, and the abuse controversy that resurfaced that year. Minchin released the song on the Internet with a cartoon showing multi-ethnic cardinals and the pope dancing the can-can without any underwear.

The song contains over 80 instances of the words "fuck", "motherfucker" and derivatives of these.

Minchin said:

"I really don't like upsetting people...and I never do it myself unless it is an incredibly carefully thought-out polemic like the Phil Daoust song or the pope song which have carefully constructed points to them." and "It's a thing of great beauty because it's a challenge, a desecration of something people hold sacred. I want to make people realise that being angry about being mean about the Pope is completely inappropriate in the context of talking about child abuse."

Minchin also explained:

That song's actually an examination of what we find offensive. It challenges people who find that language more offensive than the pedophilia. I'm constantly outraged by that. If you listen to the song carefully, it justifies its language: this is the language you should use when you're angry at kiddie-fucking.

== Synopsis ==
In the song, Minchin states that anyone protecting child molesters is a "motherfucker", which made him so angry that he was reduced to swearing.

Minchin said he wrote the song in a crude and juvenile way to demonstrate that "the actions of the Vatican, who made it a matter of public policy to protect and shelter child rapist priests while covering their actions is revolting, orders or magnitude more revolting than any repeated expletive should be".

== Controversy ==
The group "Protect The Pope" released a statement regarding this issue:

Tim Minchin is the composer of the disgusting anti-Catholic rant, 'Pope Song' seemingly designed to offend Catholics and incite hate against the Catholic Church. Imagine the uproar if Minchin had performed a similar foul-mouthed rant against Muslims, Jews or homosexuals! Members of all three groups have been involved in child sexual abuse. The lyrics are extremely offensive and mostly a rant of very obscene words."

In early 2012, Patheos.com reported on Minchin's performance of the song at the National Mall in Washington DC. The site argues that opposition to the song is because "people don't get it". The site does acknowledge the argument that "Freedom of speech is awesome, but perhaps some venues are more appropriate than others [for] saying "fuck" an absurdly frequent number of times in a song played publicly".

Patheos further claimed

"Maybe bad words are like invisible lightning bolts of evil, radiating through the child's body and causing irreparable damage and turning them into atheists who will burn in hell". Ooblick.com said those whose mental processes are blocked by the swearing, "rendering them incapable of hearing what the song actually had to say", are "delicate flowers on their fainting couches", and therefore provided a censored version for their benefit. It further explained "curse words are bad because they make some people feel momentarily uncomfortable. Child rape is bad because it causes physical harm and psychological trauma, often for a lifetime...if you're not angry enough at the church to swear, then what's wrong with you?".

In Australia, an investigation was lodged about Tim Minchin vs The Sydney Symphony Orchestra after a complaint said "'The Pope Song' was 'distasteful and offensive'; and, that the song's introduction by Tim Minchin was 'inflammatory'". The Australian Broadcast Corporation explained "the purpose...was to illustrate that the behaviour being criticised, namely pedophilia, is more offensive that the language being used to criticise it", and that "the coarse language formed a legitimate part of the song and was not gratuitous."

It was concluded that "The ACMA therefore finds that the ABC did not breach clauses 7.1 of the Code" and "The ACMA finds that the ABC did not breach clauses 7.7 of the Code".

The Independent reported "on his American tour [in 2011] he found himself piano-less in Dallas when the hire company cancelled his contract, calling him a "God-hater" and a "demon".

== Critical reception ==
JT Eberhard from Patheos.com wrote "The message of the song is clear from the lyrics, and is brilliantly written, in my opinion." PZ Myers from scienceblogs.com described the song as "utterly delightful", and explained "it's catchy. You might end up singing it around the house". Den of Geek described the song as "gloriously obscene".

The Sydney Morning Herald deemed the song "gloriously offensive". Metro described it as "an expletive-strewn yet neatly phrased anti-Pope song backed by an oompah band".
