= When I Grow Up (Matilda song) =

Song by Matilda the Musical cast

from the album Matilda the Musical (Original London Cast Recording)
- Language: English
- Released: 2011
- Recorded: May 2011
- Studio: AIR Studios
- Genre: Show tune
- Length: 3:36
- Songwriter: Tim Minchin

"When I Grow Up" is a song from the musical Matilda. Its music and lyrics were written by Tim Minchin.

== Composition ==
"When I Grow Up" was the first song that Tim Minchin wrote for Matilda, attempting to find a tone for the entire musical, drawing inspiration from his child. He also drew inspiration from a childhood memory in which the adults on his grandfather's farm would fiddle with the padlock to a gate, whereas Minchin went out of his way to hurdle the gate, promising to himself to never open the farm gate.

== Meaning ==
The song When I Grow Up "Sees Children and Adults Flying High on Swings" explains what it means to grow up. Even the adults feel they haven't yet grown up.

New York Magazine notes that in the song, "they dream of being old enough to handle the burdens that life, with its rude sense of humor, has already given them".

The New York Times writes "Matilda’s schoolmates sing of a time when they’ll be strong enough to carry the burdens forced upon them and to flush out monsters from under the bed. Grown-ups know that some burdens crush even the broadest shoulders, that there will always be some kind of monster to worry about, and that happy endings are at best only provisional." They say that they can do whatever they want when they are grown up.

== Critical reception ==
Variety described the song as "the exuberant second act opener", yet noted "it’s impossible to miss the poignancy of inchoate feelings of loss and hope flooding beneath the surface". The Hollywood Reporter wrote "Only the most chronic misanthrope could fail to get misty-eyed when these mistreated kids glide back and forth on long rope swings singing “When I Grow Up.” That song’s soul-stirring mix of yearning and escape encapsulates what makes Matilda such a joy." New York wrote "It must be a relief for the young actors — I know it is for the audience — when at the beginning of act two they get to sing a lovely, simple, Beatles-like tune called “When I Grow Up” while flying on rope swings high above the stage". The New York Times noted many adults said they cried during this song, "the show’s most conventionally pretty number". New Jersey Newsroom described it as "jubilant". Chicago Tribune said the song was the "most remarkable moment" of the show, "simple", and "gorgeous". Time Out wrote "“When I Grow Up” is a particularly affecting, wistful number that captures kids aching for adulthood, blissfully ignorant of its pains and burdens.". Entertainment Weekly named it "the second-act show-stopper", and said the song "takes a simple, round-like melody and artfully sketches a pint-size perspective on the supposedly absolute freedoms of adulthood". Out named it "the barn-raiser song".

== Performances ==
"When I Grow Up" and "Naughty" were performed in a medley at the Royal Albert Hall in November 2012.

== Certifications ==
Region	Certification	Certified units/sales
United Kingdom (BPI)	Silver	200,000^{‡}
^{‡} Sales+streaming figures based on certification alone.
