= So Rock =

Live album by Tim Minchin
- Released: 2006
- Recorded: 10/11 June 2006
- Genre: Comedy
- Length: 56:47

Tim Minchin chronology
Darkside (2005)	So Rock (2006)	Ready For This? (2009)

So Rock is the second solo comedy album released by the Australian musical comedian Tim Minchin. It was recorded during Minchin's shows at The Dolphin Theatre in Perth during June 2006.

== Reception ==
When reviewing the show, Beat Magazine said that "Minchin is as comfortable in front of the microphone as he is at his beloved piano" and that "there are few things funnier in the world than Tim Minchin on a roll". Also, The Age described his plethora of abilities by saying: "As he yoyos between piano and mic, you’re struck by the fact that he’s simultaneously an excellent stand-up comedian, a purveyor of physical comedy, an accomplished musician and a lyricist of diabolical ingenuity."

== Track listing ==
1. "So Fucking Rock" (6:42)
2. "Some People Have It Worse Than I" (3:58)
3. "London, Advertising and Hippos" (8:00)
4. "If You Really Loved Me" (4:56)
5. "Peer Pressure" (2:40)
6. "Fat Children" (4:36)
7. "Skepticism and Feet" (4:17)
8. "If You Open Your Mind Too Much Your Brain Will Fall Out (Take My Wife)" (1:50)
9. "Poetry" (1:06)
10. "Perineum Millennium (The In-Between Years)" (4:54)
11. "Censorship" (3:09)
12. "F Sharp" (1:54)
13. "Fear" (3:07)
14. "Canvas Bags" (4.51)
15. "You Grew On Me" (4:47)
16. "Second Encore" (0:44)
