= Upright (TV series) =

Australian TV series

- Genre: Comedy drama
- Created by: Chris Taylor
- Written by: Tim Minchin; Leon Ford; Kate Mulvany; Chris Taylor
- Directed by: Matthew Saville; Tim Minchin
- Starring: Tim Minchin; Milly Alcock
- Composers: Tim Minchin; Jackson Milas; Antony Partos
- Countries of origin: Australia; United Kingdom
- Original language: English
- No. of seasons: 2
- No. of episodes: 16

Production
- Executive producers: Morwenna Gordon; Tim Minchin; Helen Bowden; Penny Win; Carly Heaton
- Producers: Jason Stephens; Melissa Kelly; Chris Taylor
- Cinematography: Katie Milwright
- Editors: Deborah Peart; Mark Perry
- Running time: 25–30 minutes
- Production company: Lingo Pictures

Original release
- Network: Fox Showcase (Australia); Sky Atlantic (UK) (season 1); Sky Comedy (UK) (season 2)
- Release: 28 November 2019 – 13 December 2022

Upright is an Australian comedy drama television series created by Chris Taylor that stars Tim Minchin and Milly Alcock in the lead roles, with Minchin also writing and composing. The first season premiered on 28 November 2019 on Sky Atlantic in the United Kingdom, and on 1 December 2019 on Fox Showcase in Australia. In October 2021, the series was renewed for a second season, which premiered on 15 November 2022 on Fox Showcase in Australia and moved to Sky Comedy in the UK.

== Premise ==
The first season follows the journey of Lucky, a struggling musician, and Meg, a runaway teenager who, after literally crashing into each other's lives, attempt to transport an upright piano across the southern Australian Outback to Lucky's terminally ill mother in his hometown of Perth.

The second season takes place four years later, where Lucky, now a successful musician, and Meg, who is two months pregnant, reunite and embark on a mission to find Meg's missing mum in the rainforests of northern Queensland.

== Cast and characters ==
=== Main ===
- Tim Minchin as Laclan "Lucky" Flynn
- Milly Alcock as Megan "Meg" Adams
  - Molly Belle Wright as young Meg (guest season 2)

=== Recurring ===
- Heather Mitchell as Jen Flynn (season 1; guest season 2)
- Daniel Lapaine as Toby Flynn
- Ella Scott Lynch as Suzie Flynn (season 1; guest season 2)
- Daniel Frederiksen as Andy Adams
- Asmara Feik as Billie Flynn
- Jessica McNamee as Avery Mae (season 2)
- Hayley McElhinney as Linda Adams / Willow (season 2)
- Travis Cotton as Duncan (season 2)
- Nicholas Brown as Chubba / The Father (season 2)
- Oskar Houghton as Barley (season 2)

=== Guest ===
==== Season 1 ====
- Sachin Joab as Dr. Kashani
- Jai Koutrae as Spider
- Luke Carroll as Constable Brett
- Rebecca Massey as Constable Stacey
- Laura Brent as Elise
- Alex Chard as Will
- Syd Brisbane as Barry
- Felino Dolloso as Joey Mabilisa
- Ningali Lawford as Danni
- Joshua Orpin as Matty Adams
- Sue Jones as Bev
- Neil Melville as Jim
- Kate Box as Esme
- Rob Collins as Kane

==== Season 2 ====
- Christopher Sommers as Snapper
- Anthony Brandon Wong as Richard Hodgkinson
- Elena Carapetis as Nina
- Dimitrius Schuster-Koloamatangi as Jaxon
- Hazel Phillips as Val
- Jeanette Cronin as Barb
- Darren Gilshenan as Barney
- Tom Budge as Geert
- Noni Hazlehurst as Squirrel
- Lawrence Ola as Quiet Collin
- Hollie Andrew as Bec
- Anita Hegh as Chrysanthe
- Queenie van de Zandt as Tammy / Sage

== Episodes ==
Series	Episodes	Originally released	
Series	Episodes	First released	Last released
1	8	28 November 2019	19 December 2019
2	8	22 November 2022	13 December 2022

=== Season 1 (2019) ===
No. overall	No. in season	Title	Directed by	Written by	Original release date
1	1	"Episode 1"	Matthew Saville	Tim Minchin	28 November 2019
Lucky Flynn wants to head to Perth to return his family piano. He forges an unlikely bond with a young runaway named Meg.
2	2	"Episode 2"	Matthew Saville	Chris Taylor & Tim Minchin	28 November 2019
Lucky struggles without his anxiety medication. Meg picks a fight with bikers in a small town pub.
3	3	"Episode 3"	Matthew Saville	Leon Ford	5 December 2019
Lucky and Meg need fuel, which is complicated by Meg losing her wallet, along with all their money.
4	4	"Episode 4"	Matthew Saville	Kate Mulvany	5 December 2019
Lucky and Meg reach the half way point across the Nullarbor. At a roadside camp Lucky is goaded into reliving his glory days. Meg starts to realise that running won't leave her problems behind.
5	5	"Episode 5"	Matthew Saville	Kate Mulvany	12 December 2019
Abandoned on the Nullarbor, Lucky gets a snake bite.
6	6	"Episode 6"	Matthew Saville	Leon Ford	12 December 2019
Lucky abandons his piano in order to continue his journey west. Meg steals a horse float.
7	7	"Episode 7"	Tim Minchin & Matthew Saville	Chris Taylor & Tim Minchin	19 December 2019
Lucky gets arrested for stealing the horse float. Esme, the horse float owner drops charges but it's not Lucky's day.
8	8	"Episode 8"	Tim Minchin & Matthew Saville	Tim Minchin	19 December 2019
Meg learns the truth about the piano. Lucky arrives home for his mother's final days. Deathbed confession.

=== Season 2 (2022) ===
No. overall	No. in season	Title	Directed by	Written by	Original release date
9	1	"Reunion"	Mirrah Foulkes	Tim Minchin	22 November 2022
Years after his adventure with Meg, Lucky struggles to adjust to his new life as a successful musician and it's not long before Meg comes bursting back into his chaotic world.
10	2	"Tomatoes"	Mirrah Foulkes	Tim Minchin	22 November 2022
Beginning their search in Queensland for Meg's mum, Lucky struggles to manage his relationship back home as Meg is startled by someone who followed her from Karingunna.
11	3	"Bananas"	Mirrah Foulkes	Tim Minchin	29 November 2022
As Meg continues the search for her mum in Cairns, Lucky tries to lie low to avoid his dubious past.
12	4	"Reparations"	Mirrah Foulkes	Ian Meadows	29 November 2022
Lucky and Meg head out of Cairns, but Lucky's best-forgotten past catches up with him.
13	5	"Fold"	Mirrah Foulkes	Natesha Somasundaram & Tim Minchin	6 December 2022
Wounded in the rainforest, Lucky is desperate to return to civilisation, but Meg wants to push on as they get close to finding her mother.
14	6	"Eskimo Jonestown"	Mirrah Foulkes	Niki Aken	6 December 2022
Meg and Lucky finally make it to the Wellfulness Commune but don't get the reception they were expecting.
15	7	"Harmless Untruths"	Mirrah Foulkes	Tim Minchin	13 December 2022
Trapped at the Wellfulness Commune, Lucky starts to unravel its secrets as Meg finally gets the chance to speak to her mother.
16	8	"Enough's Enough"	Mirrah Foulkes	Tim Minchin	13 December 2022
After escaping the commune, Lucky and Meg race back to Sydney hoping to make it in time to meet Billie at the airport.

== Production ==
Lake Bumbunga in South Australia was used as a filming location for some scenes. In October 2021, the series was renewed for a second season.

== Broadcast ==
The first season premiered on 28 November 2019 on Sky Atlantic in the United Kingdom, and on 1 December 2019 on Fox Showcase in Australia. The second season premiered on 15 November 2022 on Fox Showcase in Australia and moved to Sky Comedy in the UK.

The series was later broadcast on Super Channel in Canada and on SundanceNow in the United States.

== Reception ==
"The whole thing is both quintessentially Australian and deliciously unexpected," wrote Melinda Houston for The Sydney Morning Herald when the show originally aired, adding "great to see another show making creative use of our landscapes: the dry interior is blasted one moment, enchanted the next." Decider wrote "Minchin and Alcock make a good road trip pair, and that’s pretty much what Upright is all about," and gave it a "stream it" verdict. In Luke Buckmaster's review for The Guardian, he characterizes the two leads: "Minchin’s performance combines stoner-like man-child and emotionally stunted adult with a splash of shaggy panache all his own, evolving his character from sad-sack weirdo to a reasonably complex person. Alcock is excellent as the other half of the odd couple: with a head-turning, hair-trigger performance that delivers the show an almost electrical energy."
