= Ready for This? =

Ready For This?

Live album by Tim Minchin
- Released: 20 July 2009
- Recorded: December 2008
- Genre: Comedy
- Length: 73:42

Tim Minchin chronology
So Rock (2006)	Ready For This? (2009)	Tim Minchin and the Heritage Orchestra (2011)

Ready for This? is the third solo comedy album released by the Australian musical comedian Tim Minchin.

== Description ==
Ready for This? was recorded during Minchin's show at the Queen Elizabeth Hall in London during December 2008.

During the live performances of "Bears Don't Dig on Dancing", Minchin would call an audience member up on stage to dress up in a bear costume and break dance during the song.

== Reception ==
The album received high praise from reviewers with, Chortle describing part of the epic beat poem Storm as "the most succinct, unarguable rejoinder to 'alternative medicine' that you will find anywhere" and Rave magazine describing the chorus of "Prejudice" as a "winning refrain".

One of the more contentious songs on the album is "The Song for Phil Daoust", about the Guardian writer who gave Minchin one of his very first bad reviews after seeing him at the Edinburgh Festival Fringe in 2005. Minchin has stated in interviews that he decided to use Daoust's real name as it was crucial to the material being "shocking". According to Times Online, the song "addresses the awkward relationship between critic and performer with gleeful venom".

== Track listing ==
1. "Ready for This?" (4:52)
2. "Prejudice" (6:47)
3. "I Love Jesus" (2:20)
4. "The Good Book" (4:38)
5. "If I Didn't Have You" (5:06)
6. "Confessions" (6:30)
7. "Canvas Bags" (3:39)
8. "The Interval Song" (0:57)
9. "Bears Don't Dig on Dancing" (3:55)
10. "The Song for Phil Daoust" (2:44)
11. "YouTube Lament" (2:29)
12. "Storm" (9:45)
13. "Dark Side" (9:12)
14. "White Wine in the Sun" (10:20)
15. "Encore" [bonus track] (0:28)

== "White Wine in the Sun" campaign ==
In December 2009, the track "White Wine in the Sun", which depicts Minchin's experience of Australian Christmas, was released as a downloadable single online. Fans on Minchin's official forum launched a campaign to get the track into the Christmas charts by purchasing it from various online download retailers. A Facebook group was also launched to support the campaign as well as a drive on Twitter in which celebrities were contacted about the campaign and a succession of e-mails to radio DJs in a bid to get them to play the song. It was later announced that 50% of the December profits from the song would be donated to The National Autistic Society.

The bid was ultimately unsuccessful in the face of huge publicity around the battle between Rage Against the Machine and Joe McElderry, but Minchin told fans he was grateful for the effort behind the campaign.

Despite being unsuccessful, "White Wine in the Sun" did get a placement in the UK Indie Chart, reaching a peak of #26 on 27 December 2009.

Written soon after the birth of his daughter, Minchin described the experience as "the most emotional of my songwriting life. The initial verse and chorus structure juxtaposes scepticism of religion with love of family, and the listener thinks they have the measure of the song. But then it goes and throws in a tiny baby as the listener, and starts talking directly to her. Pretty manipulative, really."

Chart	Peak position
UK Indie Chart	26

A studio version of "White Wine in the Sun" was recorded in 2012 and all proceeds taken in December were raised for the National Autism Society.

== DVD ==
There are several DVDs of the same name, released between 2009 and 2011. The Australian version was released in 2009 and distributed by Madman Entertainment.
