= Tanisha Spring =

British actress and vocalist

Tanisha L Spring is a British actress and vocalist. She is best known for playing Satine in Moulin Rouge! at the Piccadilly Theatre.

== Early life and education ==
Spring is from South London and of Jamaican descent. She is a mentor and part of the Access and Participation programme at Laine Theatre Arts.

== Career ==
=== Stage ===
In early 2020 she joined the cast of Stephen Schwartz's The Prince of Egypt in the role of Nefertari, alongside Liam Tamne, Christine Allado, Luke Brady and Alexia Khadime. The show paused its run in March 2020, due to the COVID-19 pandemic, and re-opened in August 2021.

In summer 2023 Spring played Rita in Groundhog Day, returning to the Old Vic with Andy Karl reprising the lead role.

In September 2023 Spring joined the cast of Moulin Rouge! as alternate Satine, covering the role full time from October 2023, alongside Dom Simpson as Christian.

Year	Title	Role	Theatre
2016	Beautiful: the Carole King Musical	Janelle	Aldwych Theatre
2017	Big Fish	Story Jenny	Tour
2018	Caroline, or Change	Radio	Playhouse Theatre
2019	Little Shop of Horrors	Crystal	
2021	Tina	Ikette	Aldwych Theatre
2021	The Prince of Egypt	Nefertari	Dominion Theatre
2023	Groundhog Day	Rita Hanson	Old Vic
2021-2024	Moulin Rouge!	alternate Satine/ Satine	Piccadilly Theatre
2026	Game of Thrones: The Mad King	Ashara Dayne	Royal Shakespeare Theatre

=== Filmography ===
Year	Title	Role	Notes
2018	Once an Old Lady Sat On My Chest	Uju	short
2019	Rocketman	Sylvi	movie
2021	Ted Lasso		TV series
2023	Dreaming Whilst Black	Film Set Girl	TV series, 1 episode

=== Producer ===
In 2021 Spring founded Blue Mahoe Production. Her first project, a Killer Party Musical, led to Spring being nominated as Best Producer in the Black British Theatre Awards in the same year.
