= Christine Allado =

Filipino actress (born 1995)

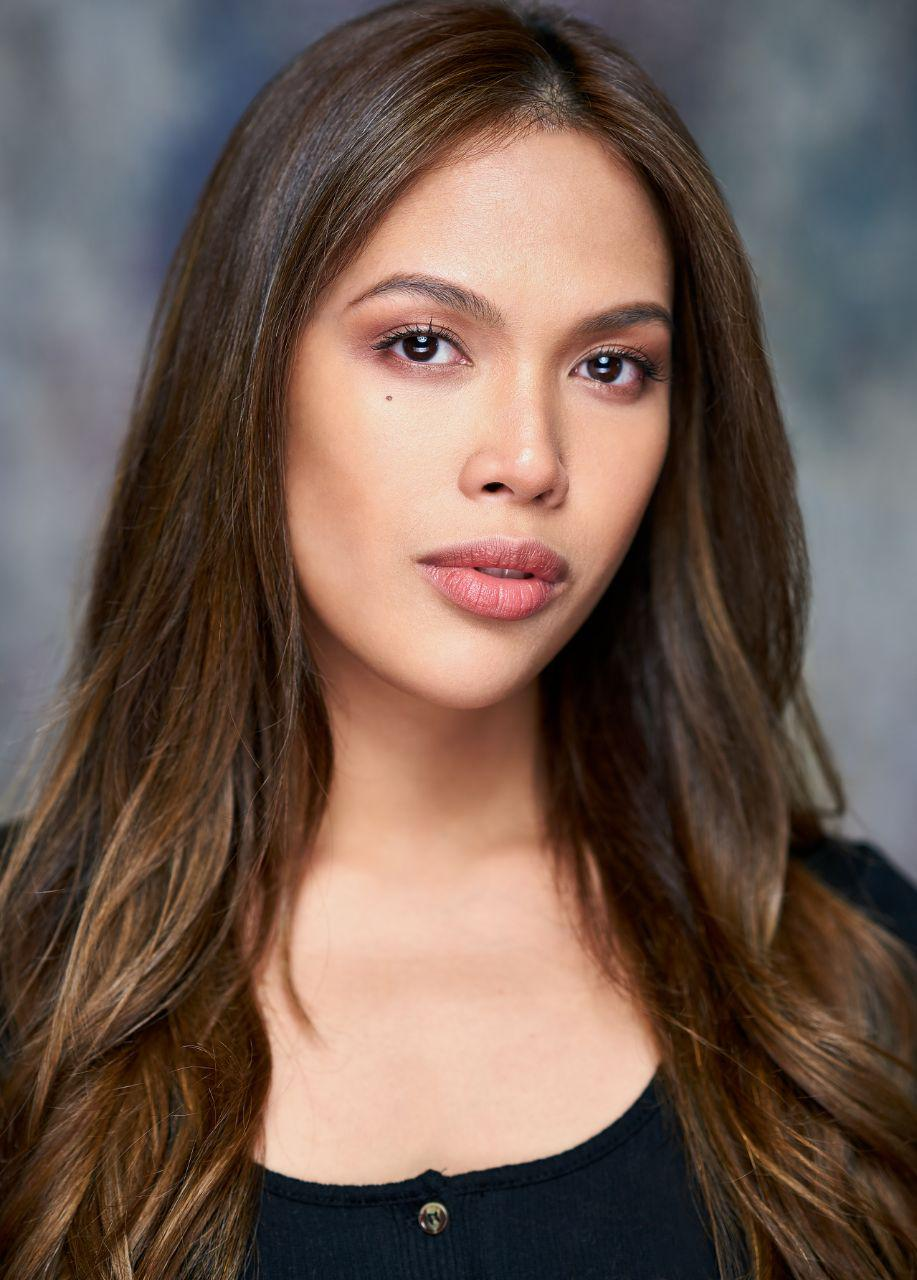
- Allado in 2019
- Born: Christine Marie Allado; 15 July 1995 (age 31); Manila, Philippines
- Occupations: Actress; singer
- Years active: 1998–present

Christine Marie Allado (born 15 July 1995) is a Filipino actress and singer. She is best known for her performance in the role of Peggy Schuyler and Maria Reynolds in the multi Tony and Olivier award-winning West End Production of Hamilton: An American Musical and for starring as Vanessa in the West End production of In The Heights, both by Lin-Manuel Miranda. Her television credits include starring in the BBC's 60th-anniversary production of West Side Story as the lead role of Maria, Jasmine in Hallmark Channel's TV film Royal Hearts, and Agent Beverly Walker for The Accidental Spy. She most recently starred in the musical The Prince of Egypt at the Dominion Theatre in the West End. She was nominated for a Grammy Award in the category Best Musical Album for the original recording of The Prince of Egypt. She sang the Philippine national anthem for Manny Pacquiao's boxing against Jeff Horn.

== Early life and education ==
Allado is the daughter of Jojo Allado and Letty Guevara. She attended the University of the Philippines and Playshop school theatre workshops, and performed in several productions there including Hairspray, The Phantom of the Opera, and Joseph and the Amazing Technicolor Dreamcoat.

== Career ==
Allado moved to Hong Kong at age 18 and went to work as a performer for Hong Kong Disneyland. She moved again to London, United Kingdom, and enrolled in musical theatre at the Royal Academy of Music.

Allado's first theatre role in London's West End was in Tim Rice's From Here To Eternity at the Shaftesbury Theatre in 2013, taking on the role of Minerva and serving as understudy for the lead Lorene. In 2014 she had roles in a production of Fat Boy Slim and David Byrne's Here Lies Love, which was transferred from the Public Theater in New York to the National Theatre in London. She performed the role of Ursula in Sweet Charity at the Royal Exchange Theatre and the title role in the show Turandot, staged by the Tête à Tête opera company.

She headlined Magic of the Musicals at the Royal Albert Hall for Magic Radio, which was broadcast live and streamed worldwide.

In 2016, Allado performed with Italian opera singer Andrea Bocelli at a concert at the Mall of Asia Arena in the Philippines. That year she was a finalist on Britain's Got Talent on ITV as part of four-member girl band Zyrah. They were previously signed to Universal Records and have released four No.1 singles on the iTunes charts. She sings the lead role of Constance for the original West End recording of The Clockmaker's Daughter.

Also in 2016, she was announced as Vanessa in the Olivier winner production of In the Heights at the King's Cross Theatre, taking over the role from Jade Ewen.

In 2017, Allado took on the dual role of Peggy Schuyler and Maria Reynolds in the London production of Hamilton. The show has gained considerable critical acclaim, and Allado's performance has received many positive reviews from renowned US and UK based publications. Sometimes, she played the role of Eliza Hamilton.

In 2020 Allado played the role of Tzipporah in The Prince of Egypt musical on the stage of the Dominion Theatre in London, alongside Luke Brady, Liam Tamne and Alexia Khadime.

Allado played Meat in We Will Rock You at the London Coliseum from 2 June to 27 August 2023.

From September 2023, Allado joined the Broadway legend Bernadette Peters and Lea Salonga in the cast of Stephen Sondheim's Old Friends for a limited 16-week run at the Gielgud Theatre.

In 2024, Allado starred as Julie Jordan in Carousel in Concert at the Royal Festival Hall, alongside Jamie Muscato as Billy Bigelow and Rebecca Caine as Nettie Fowler. The concert production was presented by the London Musical Theatre Orchestra and conducted by Freddie Tapner. In 2025, she performed in Disney in Concert at the Sydney Opera House, a symphonic celebration of Disney's iconic music.

Allado played Esmeralda in the UK premiere concert of The Hunchback of Notre Dame at the Prince Edward Theatre in the summer of 2025. Cast included Ben Joyce as Quasimodo, Zachary James as Claude Frollo, Dex Lee as Captain Phoebus and Adam Strong as Clopin.

In September 2025, Allado starred as Rachel Marron in the Philippine production of The Bodyguard: The Musical at the Proscenium Theater in Rockwell, opposite West End actor Matt Blaker.

In January 2026, Allado starred as Jo March in the world premiere concert production of Jo – The Little Women Musical at the Theatre Royal Drury Lane in London. The musical, based on Little Women, featured music by Dan Redfeld with book and lyrics by Christina Harding and John Gabriel Koladziej, and was presented in a one-night-only semi-staged concert performance.

== Filmography ==
Year	Title	Role	Theatre	Notes
2013	From Here To Eternity	Minerva/Understudy Lorene	Shaftesbury Theatre	
2014	Here Lies Love	Dovee	National Theatre	
	Sweet Charity	Ursula	Royal Exchange Theatre	
2016	In the Heights	Vanessa	King's Cross Theatre	
2017	Hamilton	Peggy Schuyler/ Maria Reynolds	Victoria Palace Theatre	
2020	The Prince of Egypt	Tzipporah	Dominion Theatre	
2023	We Will Rock You	Meat	London Coliseum	
2023	Stephen Sondheim's Old Friends	performer	Gielgud Theatre	
2024	Carousel in concert	Julie Jordan	Royal Festival Hall	
2025	The Hunchback of Notre Dame	Esmeralda	Prince Edward Theatre	
2025	The Bodyguard: The Musical	Rachel Marron	Proscenium Theater, Rockwell	Philippine production

== Discography ==
- Zyrah - 2014 - Assassin's Creed, Game of Thrones, I See Fire, Oblivion
- The Clockmaker's Daughter - 2019 - Original Studio Cast Recording
- The Prince of Egypt - 2020 - Original Studio Cast Recording
- Jo – The Little Women Musical - 2025 -(Original Studio Cast Recording, Center Stage Records) – as Jo March

== Awards and nominations ==
Year	Work	Role	Award	Category	Result
2018	Hamilton	Peggy Schuyler/ Maria Reynolds	IARA Awards	Best Female Stage Performer	Nominated
2019	Hamilton	Peggy Schuyler/ Maria Reynolds	WhatsOnStage Awards	Best Supporting Actress in a Musical	Nominated
2021	The Prince of Egypt (Original Cast Recording)	—	Grammy Awards	Best Musical Theater Album	Nominated
