= Elise McCann =

Australian actress and singer

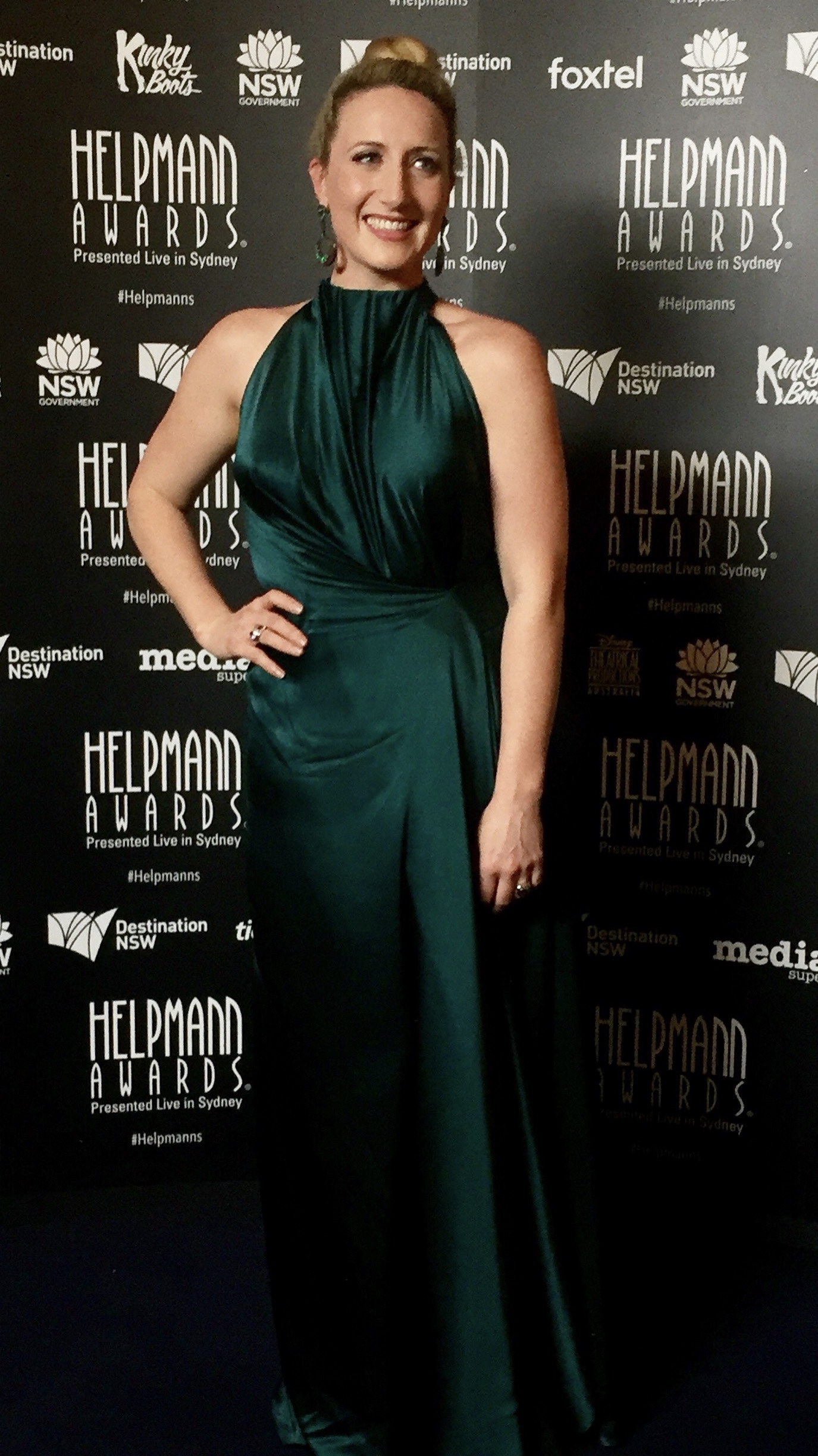
- McCann at the 2017 Helpmann Awards
- Born: 28 July 1984 (age 42); Wodonga, Victoria, Australia
- Occupations: Actor; singer
- Years active: 2005–present
- Television: Peter Allen: Not the Boy Next Door
- Spouse: Andy Karl (2025–present)
- Website: elisemccann.com

Elise McCann (born 28 July 1984) is an Australian actress and musical theatre performer most well known for originating the role of Miss Honey in the Australian production of Matilda the Musical and as Lucille Ball in Everybody Loves Lucy.

McCann appeared as Lynne Woolnough, Peter Allen's Sister, in the Australian television mini series Peter Allen: Not the Boy Next Door in 2015 and released her debut album Dahlesque with ABC Music on 23 June 2017.

She is currently based in both Melbourne and New York and performs internationally. Her performance career includes theatre, concerts and television.

== Early life ==
Born in Wodonga, Victoria, McCann grew up in Sydney and attended Loreto Normanhurst. Upon graduating, Elise was accepted into the National Institute of Dramatic Art (NIDA) Music Theatre program and the University of New South Wales (UNSW) Bachelor of Arts Law. She chose to attend NIDA and later went back to study Arts/Law part-time.

== Theatre ==
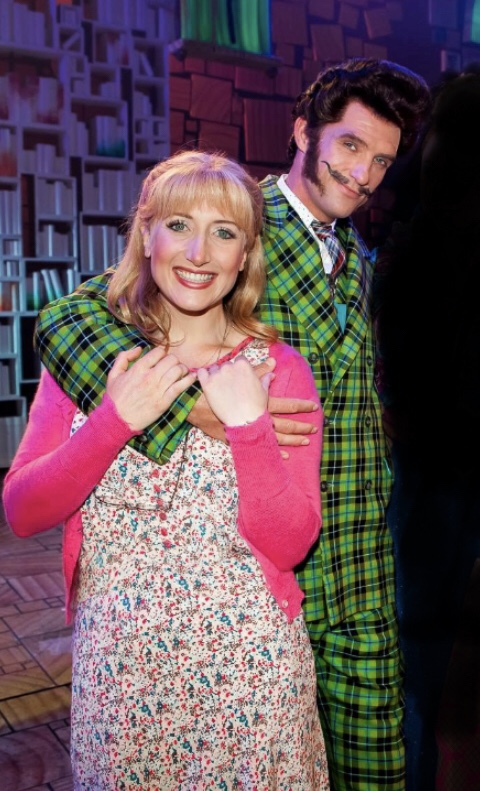
Elise McCann, Miss Honey in Matilda the Musical Australia

McCann's professional debut was in the Australian revival cast of Fiddler on the Roof alongside Topol.

She has played the roles of Ali in the 10th-anniversary Australian Tour of Mamma Mia!; Ado Annie in Oklahoma! and Meg Brockie in Brigadoon both for The Production Company; Cordelia in Falsettos for Darlinghurst Theatre Company and as Florinda in Stephen Sondheim's Into The Woods for Victorian Opera.

In 2010 McCann was cast in the world premiere production of Doctor Zhivago opening at the Lyric Theatre, Sydney on 19 February 2011. The production was directed by Des McAnuff and ran from 19 February 2011 until 3 April 2011 in Sydney, after which it travelled to Melbourne and Brisbane, closing on 14 August 2011.

In 2012 McCann was cast in the Australian production of Bartlett Sher's revival of South Pacific, opening at the Sydney Opera House in August 2012. South Pacific went on to tour to Melbourne and Brisbane followed by a Perth season in 2013 and a return Sydney season again at the Sydney Opera House. The 2012 Sydney Opera House production was filmed for DVD release however was never officially released.

In 2015 McCann was nominated for her first Sydney Theatre Award for her performance in the role of Lucille Ball in the one-woman show Everybody Loves Lucy. Produced by Luckiest Productions, Everybody Loves Lucy was co-written by McCann and Richard Carroll, directed by Helen Dallimore, choreographed by Christopher Horsey with musical direction by Nigel Ubrihien. Everybody Loves Lucy ran sold-out seasons in June–July 2014 after which it embarked on a six-week national Australian tour in February–March 2015. McCann was simultaneously filming Peter Allen: Not the Boy Next Door for Shine/Network 7, so Australian actress Francine Cain was cast as the understudy and performed as Lucille at a number of performances. In 2017 Everybody Loves Lucy embarked on a regional Australian tour with Jayde Westaby in the role of Miss Ball as McCann was performing around the country in Matilda the Musical.

McCann is most well known for originating the role of Miss Honey in the Australian cast of The Royal Shakespeare Company (RSC) production of Matilda the Musical. McCann originally auditioned for the role of Mrs Wormword but was spotted by director Matthew Warchus and chosen to play the iconic role of Miss Honey, Matilda's kind school teacher.

The production, produced by Louise Withers in conjunction with the RSC, had preview performances from 28 July 2015 before opening at the Sydney Lyric theatre on 20 August 2015. Alongside McCann, the adult principal cast included Marika Aubrey and Daniel Frederiksen as Mr. and Mrs. Wormwood, and James Millar as Miss Trunchbull. The Sydney season ended on Sunday 29 February 2016 before transferring to Melbourne's Princess Theatre from 13 March. The Melbourne season was extended until 11 November, after which a new season was announced to start in Brisbane, Perth, Adelaide, and Auckland. The Matilda tour continued on to Brisbane from 25 November 2016 to 12 February 2017 at the Queensland Performing Arts Centre (QPAC) before moving on to perform at the Crown Theatre in Perth from 28 February until 7 May 2017.

McCann performed the role over 650 times in two years and chose to leave the show on 19 March 2017 midway through the Perth season. Lucy Maunder was cast to replace McCann.

For her performance as Miss Honey, McCann won the 2016 Helpmann Award for Best Female Actor in a Supporting role in a Musical, as well as the 2015 Sydney Theatre Award for Best Female Actor in a Supporting Role in a Musical and was nominated for the 2017 Green Room Award for her portrayal of Miss Honey.

Other theatre credits include the Australian Premiere of Little Women the Musical, the 2009 Australian and New Zealand tour of My Fair Lady for Opera Australia, Camelot for The Production Company and June in Musical of Musicals the Musical.

McCann appeared in two stage readings for Neglected Musicals: On the Twentieth Century in March 2012 and as Sydney Carlton in It's A Bird, It's A Plane, It's Superman in October 2014.

In 2019 McCann headlined The Ensemble Theatre company's 2019 season in the role of Cathy Hiatt in the Jason Robert Brown cult musical The Last Five Years. In September 2019 McCann was the special guest singer at the Waislitz Global Citizen Awards in New York City as part of the 2019 Global Citizen Festival.

Prior to the outbreak of the COVID-19 pandemic McCann was announced to appear as Mary Flynn in Merrily We Roll Along at the Hayes Theatre and as Miss Hedge in the Australian Premiere of Everybody's Talking About Jamie opening at the Sydney Opera House in July 2020.

McCann was cast as Rita Hanson opposite Andy Karl in the Australian production of Groundhog Day, which premiered in Melbourne in January 2024 at the Princess Theatre. This is the second time she has been cast in a musical written by Tim Minchin and directed by Matthew Warchus.

She was cast in 2025 as Barbara Maitland in the Australian production of Beetlejuice.

== Television ==
In 2015 McCann was cast in Peter Allen: Not the Boy Next Door, a two-part Australian miniseries about music legend Peter Allen that screened on the Seven Network. McCann played Lynne Woolnough, Allen's sister, performing opposite Joel Jackson as Peter Allen and Rebecca Gibney as Marion Woolnough, their mother.

In 2018 McCann filmed the pilot for a new Australian comedy drama - Tumbling - about three Gen Y sisters. Directed by Hayley McFarlane, McCann played the eldest of the three sisters alongside Australian actors Melina Vidler and Sara West.

== Concerts and live performances ==
McCann has headlined Light the Night, Twisted Broadway, Hats Off!, the Mission Australia Charity Gala, Westmead Children's Hospital Charity Ball, The Awakening Concert, The Sydney Women's Fund Annual Charity Gala and the ACON Worlds AIDS Day Concert. She has guested at the Sydney Theatre Awards, Carols in the Domain, New Musicals Australia Launch, Australian Ethic Small Business Awards, the Australian Mo Awards, the Third Annual Cabaret Showcase at Bar Me, All Star Cabaret for the Sydney Theatre Company and Up Close and Musical for Kookaburra.

In April 2012, Elise joined Ruthie Henshall and others in Side by Side by Sondheim, a musical revue showcasing the work of composer Stephen Sondheim performed at the Theatre Royal, Sydney.

In 2014 Elise was part of the workshop cast of a Stephen Schwartz revue with the working title Popular. The revue was later renamed 'Defying Gravity: the songs of Stephen Schwartz' and premiered in Sydney at The Theatre Royal in February 2016. McCann was performing in Matilda the Musical at the time, however she was invited to perform with Stephen Schwartz himself at a one off conversation series 'Stephen Schwartz in Conversation' curated by Leigh Sales. McCann sang The Hardest Part of Love from Children of Eden accompanied by Schwartz on the piano.

On Monday 11 July 2016 McCann performed at the 'From Sydney with Love Concert' at Sydney Town Hall alongside Shoshana Bean, Magda Szubanski, Joel Creasey and Virginia Gay amongst others, raising funds for the victims of the Orlando gun shootings. The Sydney concert was produced by Trevor Ashley, Catherine Alcorn and George Youakim in association with ACON and the City of Sydney and raised over $70,000 for the Equality Florida Pulse Victims Fund.

McCann sang the Australian National Anthem at the Women's Rugby union Australia vs. New Zealand Bledisloe Cup Match on 18 August 2018 at ANZ Stadium Sydney. For the first time on Australian soil the Wallaroos played a double header match alongside the Wallabies and the New Zealand All Blacks and Black Ferns.

In June 2018 McCann joined the West End company of Beyond the Barricade in a national Australian tour of the UK's popular Musical Theatre concert. McCann stepped in with only 3 days notice replacing Katie Leeming who had to return to the UK due to ill health. McCann joined three past principal performers from London's longest-running musical Les Misérables, in the West End and on UK tour – Andy Reiss, David Fawcett and Poppy Tierney. The show performed across NSW, VIC, SA, QLD and WA in a sold out 6-week national tour.

== Dahlesque ==
In 2017 McCann premiered an original new concert Dahlesque at the 2017 Adelaide Cabaret Festival.

Dahlesque features a range of music from varying adaptations of Roald Dahl's classic stories including Tim Minchin's Matilda the Musical, the Gene Wilder movie Willy Wonka and the Chocolate Factory, Pasek and Paul's James and the Giant Peach, Marc Shaiman & Scott Wittman's Charlie and the Chocolate Factory and more. The concert was written by Everybody Loves Lucy writing duo, McCann and Richard Carroll, and features Musical Arrangements by Stephen Amos, with direction by Sheridan Harbridge and Ben Gerrard. The world premiere Adelaide concert was Musically Directed by Michael Tyack and performed with a 9-piece orchestra made up of strings, piano, celeste and tuned percussion.

In April 2018 McCann performed 4 concerts of Dahlesque at the Malthouse Theatre, Melbourne with the Melbourne Symphony Orchestra (MSO). Amos re-orchestrated the concert for a 40-piece orchestra and musically directed the 4 MSO concerts, with Brett Kelly as conductor.

McCann recorded her debut album of Dahlesque with ABC Music in 2017. It features the nine-piece orchestra arrangements of the numbers from the concert, and the physical edition of the album contains two bonus tracks – original compositions of 'Little Red Riding Hood & The Wolf' and 'The Three Little Pigs' from Dahl's Revolting Rhymes. The online and streaming services across Australia and New Zealand do not offer these two additional songs, which were composed by Stephen Amos. The album was released nationally on 23 June 2017 under ABC Music and received rave reviews. It is distributed by Universal Music.

== Producing ==
McCann is also an emerging producer under her production company Oriel Entertainment Group. To date she has produced multiple seasons of the one man play I Am My Own Wife by Doug Wright starring Ben Gerrard and directed by Shaun Rennie. The first production opened in Sydney in 2015 and since has toured to Melbourne (2017) and Brisbane (2017 & 2018). As well as developing the original new theatre piece Carmen, Live or Dead in Melbourne in 2017 and its subsequent premiere season at the Hayes Theatre, Sydney in 2018; and her own concert show Dahlesque.

== Recordings ==
- Dahlesque (2017); album by Elise McCann and ABC Music. Musical Director Stephen Amos. Produced by James Kempster & Stephen Amos. Distributed by Universal Music.

== Awards and nominations ==
Year	Award	Category	Production	Role	Result
2015	Sydney Theatre Awards	Best Performance in a Cabaret Production	Everybody Loves Lucy	Lucille Ball	Nominated
2015	Sydney Theatre Awards	Best Female Actor in a Supporting Role in a Musical	Matilda the Musical	Miss Honey	Won
2016	Helpmann Awards	Best Female Actor in a Supporting Role in a Musical	Matilda the Musical	Miss Honey	Won
2017	Green Room Awards	Best Female Actor in a Supporting Role in a Musical	Matilda the Musical	Miss Honey	Nominated
