= JoAnn M. Hunter =

American dancer, choreographer and theatre director

JoAnn M. Hunter is an American dancer, theatre choreographer and director. She began her career as a Broadway performer before working as a dance captain and associate choreographer, and later moved into choreography and directing.

== Early life and education ==
Hunter was born outside Tokyo, Japan, to a Japanese mother and American father. She moved to the United States at age four and was raised in Coventry, Rhode Island, where she began dancing by around age ten.

Hunter later received a scholarship to study dance in New York City under Charles Kelly and moved to New York at age seventeen.

== Career ==
=== Performance and transition to choreography ===
She made her Broadway debut in 1989 in Jerome Robbins' Broadway.

As a Broadway performer, Hunter also appeared in other productions, including Chicago, Kiss Me, Kate, Guys and Dolls, Thoroughly Modern Millie, Shogun and Miss Saigon. By 2018, she had appeared in twelve Broadway productions and had worked creatively on seven others.

While performing in Thoroughly Modern Millie, Hunter was invited by Rob Ashford to work as his associate choreographer, beginning her transition from performing into creative work. She later said she had not previously planned to become a choreographer.

As a performer, Hunter worked with choreographers, including Ashford, Rob Marshall, Kathleen Marshall, Bill T. Jones, Peter Gennaro, Ann Reinking and Christopher Chadman. She identified Jerome Robbins, with whom she worked on three productions, as a major choreographic influence.

Hunter later worked as a dance captain and served as associate choreographer on the Broadway production of All Shook Up. Her first independent choreography assignment was the 2008 U.S. national tour of Chitty Chitty Bang Bang, followed by her first Broadway choreography assignment, a revival of On a Clear Day You Can See Forever.

In 2009, Hunter sustained a tibial plateau fracture in a softball accident that required surgery and kept her from performing for almost a year. She later said the injury prompted her to make the transition to choreography full-time.

=== Choreography and directing ===
Her Broadway choreography credits included On a Clear Day You Can See Forever, Disaster! and School of Rock.

She later choreographed the 2019 West End revival of Joseph and the Amazing Technicolor Dreamcoat. A review in London Theatre noted that Hunter expanded several musical numbers into dance breaks, including a tap sequence in "Potiphar", and described the first-act finale for "Go, Go, Go Joseph" as "spectacular".

Hunter also choreographed the West End and Broadway productions of Cinderella, later titled Bad Cinderella on Broadway. For the 2021 West End production, she created a new waltz sequence for the musical.

In 2023, Hunter directed and choreographed the musical SuperYou, which had previously been presented in concert at Carnegie Hall.

In 2024, Hunter was named director of the Broadway-aimed musical Jo – The Little Women Musical.

Hunter later directed Karen Zacarías's play Native Gardens at the Westport Country Playhouse.

Hunter choreographed the 2026 world premiere of Iceboy! at Chicago's Goodman Theatre. Directed by Marc Bruni, the production starred Megan Mullally and Nick Offerman.
