= Steven Lutvak =

American musician and composer (1959–2023)

- Born: July 18, 1959; New York City, U.S.
- Died: October 9, 2023 (aged 64); New York City, U.S.
- Education: Binghamton University (BA); New York University (MFA)
- Occupations: Composer; singer-songwriter
- Notable work: A Gentleman's Guide to Love and Murder
- Spouse: Michael McGowan (m. 2015)
- Children: 1
- Website: stevenlutvak.com

Steven Jaret Lutvak (July 18, 1959 – October 9, 2023) was an American composer who worked in musical theatre, film, and television. He was best known for writing the music and co-writing the lyrics for the musical A Gentleman's Guide to Love and Murder, which won the Tony Award for Best Musical in 2014.

== Life and career ==
Steven Lutvak was born in The Bronx, New York, on July 18, 1959. He attended Binghamton University, earning a bachelor's degree in music in 1980. He went on to attend the first graduate program in musical theatre writing at the Tisch School of the Arts, graduating in 1983.

Lutvak wrote a number of musicals which were performed Off-Off Broadway and in regional theatre, and frequently collaborated with Robert L. Freedman. For their musical Campaign of the Century, they won the California Musical Theater Competition from the Beverly Hills Theater Guild. However, they were best known for A Gentleman's Guide to Love and Murder (2012). It ran for over two years on Broadway and won the Tony Award for Best Musical. For his work on the show, Lutvak was nominated for the Tony Award for Best Original Score.

Lutvak composed the title track to the documentary film Mad Hot Ballroom, and wrote music for The Wayside Inn, Esmeralda, Almost September, and Campaign of the Century. He also released his own album, entitled The Time it Takes.

Lutvak's musical Alfred Hitchcock Presents (based on the television series) will premiere posthumously in Bath in March 2025.

== Personal life and death ==
Lutvak married Michael McGowan in 2015. They had a daughter. Lutvak died from a pulmonary embolism at his studio in Manhattan on October 9, 2023, at the age of 64.

== Awards and recognition ==
In 2014, Lutvak and Freedman's A Gentleman's Guide to Love and Murder won the Drama Desk Award for Outstanding Lyrics, and was also nominated for Outstanding Music. The show was also nominated for an Outer Critics Circle Award for Outstanding New Score, and received a Tony Award nomination for Original Score. In 2006, Lutvak received the Kleban Award for Lyric Writing for the Theater, as well as the Fred Ebb Award for Songwriting for the Theater alongside Robert L. Freedman. Lutvak was a 2005 recipient of the American Theatre Wing's Jonathan Larson Grant. Lutvak was associated with the Sundance Theatre Institute, won a Johnny Mercer Foundation Emerging American Songwriter Award, two Bistro Awards, and three MAC Awards, and was a multi-time recipient of an ASCAP Award.
