= Welcome to Thebes =

- Welcome to Thebes promotional poster
- Original language: English
- Written by: Moira Buffini
- Characters: See below
- Genre: Tragedy

Welcome to Thebes is a 2010 play by Moira Buffini. It premiered on 15 June 2010 in a production at the Olivier Theatre of the Royal National Theatre in London directed by Richard Eyre.

== Plot ==
Set in "a city named Thebes, somewhere in the 20th century", the play is introduced by militia sergeant named Miletus and two child soldiers under his command, Scud and Megeara. They discover the body of Polynices, a warlord in the recently ended civil war and brother of Antigone and Ismene. Meanwhile, Ismene and the new female president of Thebes, Eurydice, widow of Creon and head of an all-female cabinet (except for the minister of Education, who is a "token man"), get ready for the arrival of Theseus, first citizen of the powerful democratic state of Athens. He is on his way for talks with Eurydice regarding aid to rebuild Thebes after the civil war. The cabinet's Justice Minister spends the same time gathering testimonies from victims of the civil war, such as Polykleitos, whose son died in the war. The champion athlete, war criminal and warlord Tydeus ran against Eurydice in the election and is now leader of the opposition, but he spends the time before Theseus' arrival plotting to take back power with his lover, Polynices' widow Pargeia. The Justice Minister then arrives to accuse Tydeus of war crimes, and Pargeia of embezzling charity funds.

Eurydice is informed of the body's discovery and goes to see it. Theseus arrives by helicopter and is irked by Eurydice's late arrival and the mysterious warnings of the blind hermaphrodite Tiresias. He puts up a friendly front, however, and goes with Eurydice to her public inauguration. There she announces that she will refuse Polynices' body burial and Tydeus suffers or feigns possession by the god Dionysus. The following night Theseus makes a pass at Eurydice and is rebuffed, and also keeps up to date with his wife Phaedra and his son Hippolytus. In the meantime Antigone makes an attempt to bury her brother but is stopped and captured by Miletus and his soldiers.

The following morning sees the start of aid talks between Theseus and Eurydice. Miletus and his soldiers arrive at the senate with Antigone and Theseus's white aide Talthybia comes out to see what is going on, only to be mistaken for a ghost by Scud, who pulls a gun on her. Theseus rushes out with Phaex and his other bodyguards to see what is going on, but only exacerbates the situation, with Megeara pulling a gun on them. In the ensuing stand-off, Scud is accidentally shot dead by Phaex and the aid talks break down. Tydeus and Pargeia see their chance and begin to win over Theseus to their side, whilst Eurydice decides that her refusal to bury Polynices has brought the disaster on herself. She has Scud and Polynices buried in one grave and goes back to Theseus.

Theseus seems to have almost gone over to Tydeus' side when Eurydice's justice minister produces Polykleitos, who gives evidence against Tydeus as a war criminal and speaks about how Tydeus killed his son. Tydeus plans to cause an uprising, but is then knifed to death by Megeara, whose fellow villagers had been killed by his troops. Theseus then receives news of Phaedra's suicide and curses his son, who he thinks has brought about the suicide. Antigone in the meantime accepts a proposal of marriage from Eurydice's blinded son Haemon. In a state of shock at news of the suicide, Theseus agrees to invite Eurydice to Athens and resume the talks there. Miletus and Megeara then decide to travel to Athens to try their fortunes there.

== Literary references ==
- The play draws its plot on Polynices' burial from Sophocles' Antigone, though it substitutes Creon's widow Eurydice for Creon.
- Theseus receives news by mobile phone of his wife Phaedra, her incestuous love for his son by a previous marriage Hippolytus and its aftermath, all drawing on Euripides' Hippolytus.
- The women of Thebes are mentioned to have held a 'sex strike' to bring an end to the civil war, drawing on Aristophanes' Lysistrata.

== Cast (premiere production) ==
- Eurydice – Nikki Amuka-Bird
- Megeara – Madeline Appiah
- Pargeia, widow of Polynices – Rakie Ayola
- Junior Lieutenant Scud – Omar Brown / Rene Gray
- Talthybia – Jacqueline Defferary
- Theseus – David Harewood
- Ismene – Tracy Ifeachor
- Prince Tydeus – Chuk Iwuji
- Harmonia – Alexia Khadime
- Phaeax – Ferdinand Kingsley
- Aglaea – Aicha Kossoko
- Haemon – Simon Manyonda
- Tiresias – Bruce Myers
- Euphrosyne – Pamela Nomvete
- Polykleitos – Daniel Poyser
- Thalia – Joy Richardson
- Scud – Kedar Williams-Stirling
- Antigone – Vinette Robinson
- Sergeant Miletus – Michael Wildman
- Ensemble – Jessie Burton, Daniel Fine, Karlina Grace, Irma Inniss, Cornelius Macarthy, Clare Perkins, Victor Power, Zara Tempest Walters
