= Alfred Hitchcock Presents (musical) =

2025 stage musical

- The Musical
- Original UK production poster
- Music: Steven Lutvak
- Lyrics: Steven Lutvak
- Book: Jay Dyer
- Basis: Alfred Hitchcock Presents
- Premiere: 22 March 2025: Theatre Royal, Bath, Somerset
- Productions: 2025 Bath, Somerset

Alfred Hitchcock Presents - The Musical is a stage musical with music and lyrics by Steven Lutvak and a book by Jay Dyer, based on Alfred Hitchcock's anthology television series of the same name.

== Production history ==
=== World premiere: Bath (2025) ===
On 1 August 2024, it was announced the musical would have its world premiere at Theatre Royal, Bath, Somerset, beginning previews on 22 March 2025 (with a press night on 25 March), running until 12 April. John Doyle would direct the production and it would be produced by Theatre Royal Bath in association with Universal Theatrical Group.

On 14 November 2024, casting was announced, including Scarlett Strallen, Sally Ann Triplett, Nicola Hughes, Gary Milner and Damian Humbley.

== Cast and characters ==
Character	Bath
Character	2025
Millie	Keanna Bloomfield
Richard & Ray	Alistair Brammer
Tommy	Matthew Caputo
Arthur & Jerome	Ahmed Hamad
Eve	Nicola Hughes
Courtney	Damian Humbley
Maloney & Waterbury	Mark Meadows
Detective Novak & Roman	Gary Milner
Blanche & Millie's mama	Landi Oshinowo
Lisa & Nurse Thornhill	Jade Oswald
Mary	Scarlett Strallen
Fred & Carl	Liam Tamne
Lottie Croakem & Sadie Grimes	Sally Ann Triplett
Michael & Deitz	Joaquin Pedro Valdes
Ensemble	Georgia Mann; Ritesh Manugula; Choolwe Laina Muntanga; Matt Pettifor; Jack Reitman
