= The Clockmaker's Daughter =

- Music: Michael Webborn & Daniel Finn
- Lyrics: Michael Webborn & Daniel Finn
- Premiere: 27 May 2015: Landor Theatre, London

The Clockmaker's Daughter is a musical with music and lyrics by Michael Webborn and Daniel Finn.

The musical is set in late 19th-century Ireland, in the fictional town of Spindlewood. The story is focused around William 'Will' Riley and his developing relationship with Constance, who was secretly made (by Abraham Reed) of clock-work.

== Synopsis ==
Present Day (The town of Spindlewood): The residents gather at the foot of a beautiful statue in the town square – a young girl toasting the sky. A Storyteller arrives to tell her story ("The Turning Of The Key").

1895: A master clockmaker (Abraham Reed) struggles to cope after the death of his daughter ("You're Still Here"). Unable to let go, he fashions an automaton in her image: a machine so life-like it appears completely human. It is only when he winds this creation, that he realises the machine can do much more than mimic movement. Constance, as he names her, can talk and think for herself ("Impossible").

He gives Constance one rule: she must never leave the house. It isn’t long, however, before the yearning proves too much for her and she escapes one morning while Abraham is away ("A Story Of My Own"). In Spindlewood, Constance accidentally collides with a young girl (Amelia) who is carrying her newly bought wedding dress. The dress falls into the village well and is ruined. Constance runs away, mortified. Will Riley - the son of the dressmaker responsible for the now-ruined wedding dress – watches close by.

Constance decides to make a new dress for Amelia. Will finds her as she sneaks out to deliver it and together they leave the new dress on Amelia’s doorstep. By morning, talk of a mystery seamstress is rife in Spindlewood. Will’s mother: the dressmaker, Ma’ Riley vows revenge on whoever created it. Amelia, on the other hand, offers ‘guest of honour’ at her wedding for whoever made it.

Abraham realises Constance has disobeyed him. They argue and Abraham locks Constance in her room. Will arrives and convinces her to attend the wedding anyway, disobeying Reed for a second time. She gives in to Will and does so.

Time passes. Abraham and Constance have grown estranged. Constance spends more and more time in town with her new friends, Amelia and Will. Constance and Abraham argue once more and Abraham refuses to wind her. Deeply upset, Constance meets Will and almost tells him the truth before panicking and running away. As Will is returning to town, he sees a commotion in the middle of the square . . . Constance has stopped, in public, in front of everyone. Abraham appears and winds her in front of them. The town realise what she is…

Ma’ Riley capitalises on this, spreading lies and fear about the clockwork girl. Will finds himself conflicted. Amelia is the only one who refuses to change her opinion of Constance. She helps Will realise his love for her but just as Will is about to go to Constance, Ma’ blocks his path. They argue and fight. There is an accident during the scuffle, Ma’s gun misfires and Will is mortally wounded.

Abraham reveals a second clockwork automaton, telling Constance he has found a way to become this machine, for her. Constance is horrified. Will arrives and tries to take Constance’s Key from Abraham. By this point, however, Will is exhausted and he falls and dies in her arms.

Ma’ has told the townsfolk that Constance is the one who shot Will. And now, afraid and enraged, the town turn into a mob, marching to Abraham’s house, armed. Constance, knowing she has no other choice, goes out to face them and is destroyed.

Abraham reveals Ma’s lie. The town repent.

Present Day (once more): The modern-day townsfolk try to wind the statue, hoping she’ll wake. Nothing happens. The crowd move off until next year. Once the square has cleared, the Storyteller removes his mask and disguise. We discover it’s Will: a now clockwork Will.

He explains how Abraham saved him that night, giving him the second clockwork body instead of keeping it for himself. Constance is yet to wake up. Despite their best efforts to fix her, she remains frozen. Hundreds of years have passed; times have changed, the world’s a different place. And Will is still waiting…

== Productions ==
The musical first premiered in 2015 at the Landor Theatre in London.

In 2018 a cast recording was released, with Christine Allado as Constance, Ramin Karimloo as Abraham, Fra Fee as Will and Hannah Waddingham as Ma Riley.

A special concert performance of the show was staged at Cadogan Hall in London in June 2019. Fra Fee, Christine Allado, Lauren James Ray, Graham Hoadly returned to the show after appearing on the cast recording, joined by John Owen-Jones as Abraham and Jamie Muscato as Henry Glynn.

== Roles and principal casts ==
Character	Original Cast	Cast recording	Cadogan Hall Concert
Character	2015	Feb 2019	June 2019
Constance	Jennifer Harding	Christine Allado	Christine Allado
Will Riley	Alan McHale	Fra Fee	Fra Fee
Abraham	Lawrence Carmichael	Ramin Karimloo	John Owen-Jones
Amelia	Alyssa Martyn	Lauren James Ray	Lauren James Ray
Ma Riley	Jo Wickham	Hannah Waddingham	Wendi Peters
Mayor Glynn	Rob McManus	Graham Hoadly	Graham Hoadly
Henry Glynn	Alex Spinney	Matthew Croke	Jamie Muscato

== Musical numbers ==
Act I

- "The Turning Of The Key"
- "You're Still Here"
- "A Modest Modiste"
- "Impossible"
- "A Story Of My Own"
- "Spindlewood"
- "Where You'll Be"
- "Keep It To Yourself"
- "A Story Of My Own - Reprise"
- "Finale Act I - Raise a Glass"

Act II

- "Market Day"
- "If You Could See My Heart"
- "Fear & Whispers"
- "If You Could See My Heart - Reprise"
- "A Town Meeting"
- "Clockwork"
- "Finale Act II"
