= Andrew Langtree =

British stage and screen actor (born 1977)

Andrew Langtree is an Olivier Award nominated British stage and screen actor from St Helens, Lancashire. He is known for stage performances including Groundhog Day at London's Old Vic Theatre, and on screen for his roles in FBI International, Coronation Street and Emmerdale.

== Theatre ==
In 1998, Langtree graduated amongst the first alumni of Sir Paul McCartney's Liverpool Institute for Performing Arts (LIPA). Following this, he was cast as Nick Piazza in the West End production of Fame, followed by Sky in the original cast of ABBA musical Mamma Mia.

Further theatre credits include Come Blow Your Horn and The Glass Menagerie at the Royal Exchange, Manchester The Rose Tattoo at London's National Theatre, Of Mice and Men at Bolton Octagon, and The Resistible Rise of Arturo Ui at the Citizens' Theatre, Glasgow.

Langtree joined the Royal Shakespeare Company in 2015, appearing in Tom Morton Smiths' Oppenheimer and Thomas Dekker's The Shoemaker's Holiday. He returned to the RSC in 2017 in Richard Bean's The Hypocrite. and in 2018 in Troilus and Cressida.

In 2012, Langtree originated the role of Carl Bruner in Ghost The Musical, receiving a What's On Stage Award nomination for Best Supporting Actor in a Musical.

In 2016, he originated the role of Ned Ryerson in Groundhog Day, at the Old Vic Theatre, and was nominated for an Olivier Award for Best Supporting Actor in a Musical. He reprised the role when the show returned in 2023.

In 2024, he joined the cast of Stranger Things; The First Shadow, playing Victor Creel.

== Screen ==
Television appearances include roles in FBI International, Heartbeat, Holby City, and Cutting It, followed by playing Leon on the ITV soap opera, Coronation Street and Justin Gallagher in the British soap opera Emmerdale.
