= The Prince of Egypt (musical) =

2017 musical by Stephen Schwartz

- Official London artwork
- Music: Stephen Schwartz
- Lyrics: Stephen Schwartz
- Book: Philip LaZebnik
- Basis: The Prince of Egypt by Philip LaZebnik
- Premiere: October 6, 2017: TheatreWorks Silicon Valley, Mountain View, California
- Productions: 2015 Workshop; 2017 Mountain View; 2018 Fredericia Teater; 2018 Tuacahn; 2018 The Danish Royal Theatre via Fredericia Teater (updated set design and dance choreographies); 2020 West End

The Prince of Egypt is a stage musical with music and lyrics by Stephen Schwartz, and a book by Philip LaZebnik. Based on the Book of Exodus with songs from the DreamWorks Animation 1998 film of the same name, the musical follows the life of Moses from being a prince of Egypt to his ultimate destiny of leading the Children of Israel out of Egypt. Starting from a workshop in 2015, the first production was mounted in 2017 in California. A London West End production debuted in 2020.

== Plot ==
=== Act I ===
In Ancient Egypt, more than 3,000 years ago, the Hebrews labor, desperate for deliverance from slavery. Egyptian soldiers, under orders to kill all Hebrew firstborn boys, snatch babies from their mothers' arms. Yocheved sings a last lullaby to her newborn, then places him in a basket and sets it out on the Nile, where it drifts into the Queen's pleasure garden. Queen Tuya is there with her infant son, Ramesses II, but when she finds the new baby in the bulrushes, she decides to adopt him and names him Moses ("Deliver Us").

18 years later, high-spirited teenagers Moses and Ramses race their chariots, destroying the marketplace and part of a temple, infuriating the high priest, Hotep ("Faster"). Afterwards, their father Pharaoh Seti I berates Ramses for his irresponsibility ("One Weak Link") and tells him he must marry the arrogant and ambitious Princess Nefertari as a political alliance. Moses defends Ramses to his father, but left alone, he wishes he could leave a mark on the world as his brother will one day ("Footprints on the Sand").

Some months later, Seti returns from a desert campaign against the rebellious Midianites ("Seti's Return"). To celebrate his victory, Seti gives Ramses a captured Midianite girl as his slave, Tzipporah ("Dance to the Day"). Later that evening, Tzipporah breaks away from her guards and winds up in Moses' bedchamber, where she defiantly says she will always be free and escapes. Moses pursues Tzipporah into the marketplace, where he runs into Miriam, his real sister, and his brother Aaron. Miriam tells him the truth about his birth, and when he refuses to believe her, she sings him their mother's lullaby, which stirs old memories in Moses. Distraught, he races back to the palace, but cannot escape his memories. He finds artwork of the Hebrew babies being drowned by Seti's men, and the Pharaoh sadly confirms that he had to make the sacrifice for the good of Egypt. Tuya finds him and tells him the truth: he is a Hebrew, but now he must forget that and continue to live as he always has, and Moses agrees ("All I Ever Wanted").

The next day, Moses is with Ramses and Hotep at the temple worksite. He attempts to act as if nothing has changed, but when he sees a guard whipping a Hebrew slave, he attacks the guard and accidentally kills him. Hotep proclaims that Moses must be punished. Moses runs off and Ramses pursues him, saying he will hide the truth of Moses' identity. Moses says that isn't possible and runs into the desert ("Make It Right"). Barely surviving ("Moses in the Desert"), Moses encounters the Midianites, led by their High Priest Jethro, who welcomes him into their tribe and tells him their philosophy ("Through Heaven's Eyes").

As the time passes, Moses and Ramses miss one another ("Faster" reprise), but Moses has become a shepherd and fallen in love with Tzipporah, Jethro's daughter, whom he has re-encountered ("Never in a Million Years"). Then one day, following a stray sheep, Moses encounters a miraculous burning bush and hears the voice of God commanding him to return to Egypt and free his people. Moses sets off with Tzipporah as, back in Egypt, Seti dies and Ramses is crowned Pharaoh ("Act I Finale").

=== Act II ===
Moses returns to Egypt ("Return to Egypt") and confronts Ramses, now married to Nefertari and the father of a son, Seti II (based on Amun-her-khepeshef). Ramses agrees to free the Hebrews if Moses will come back to court as his adviser ("Always On Your Side"), and the exultant Moses informs the Hebrews they have been freed ("Simcha"), but Hotep then appears, holding a royal decree that doubles the Hebrews' work load. Under the influence of Hotep and Nefertari, Ramses has broken his promise to Moses. The Hebrews angrily drive Moses away ("Deliver Us" reprise).

Moses finds Ramses sailing down the Nile on the royal barge, and warns him that if he does not keep his promise, Egypt will suffer. When Ramses refuses, the waters of the Nile are turned to blood, and further plagues of disease, fire and darkness ravage Egypt. Urged by Tuya to make peace with his brother, Moses pleads with Ramses to free the Hebrews, but Ramses will not relent ("The Plagues"). The final plague occurs, the death of the Egyptian first born, including Ramses' and Nefertari's son. Moses is devastated by the death and destruction he has caused ("For the Rest of My Life"). Ramses tells Moses that the Hebrews can go, while Nefertari grieves over the dead body of their son ("Heartless"). Moses tells Miriam the Hebrews are finally free, but he is too distraught to lead them. Miriam and Tzipporah, along with the freed Hebrews, revive his spirits ("When You Believe").

Moses leads the Hebrews to the edge of the Red Sea, where Tzipporah mourns the fact that she will never see her family again ("Never in a Million Years" reprise). Suddenly, the Egyptian army appears in the distance, led by Ramses and Hotep, and the Hebrews appear to be trapped. Needing a miracle to escape, Moses holds out his hand and the Red Sea parts. The Hebrews pass through the Red Sea while Moses remains to offer himself as a ransom to Ramses for the Hebrews' freedom. Hotep urges Ramses to kill Moses, but Ramses refuses, saying there has been too much death, and he will be the weak link, breaking the chain of destruction. Moses and Ramses embrace, brothers once again, and then Moses and Tzipporah follow the Hebrews. Hotep commandeers the Egyptian army and pursues Moses and the Hebrews into the parted Red Sea, but once the Hebrews have reached safety, the waters fall back, drowning Hotep and the soldiers. On opposite sides of the Red Sea, Moses and Ramses face their separate destinies, knowing that they will always have a brother who supports and understands them ("Act II Finale").

== Productions ==
=== Mountain View ===
The Prince of Egypt made its debut at TheatreWorks Silicon Valley, at the Mountain View Center for the Performing Arts in Mountain View, California, on October 6, 2017, choreographed by Sean Cheesman and directed by Scott Schwartz.

=== Copenhagen ===
The musical had its international premiere in a Danish production on April 6, 2018, at the Fredericia Teater in Fredericia, followed by a summer season at the Royal Danish Theatre in Copenhagen 2019. Fredericia Theater believed that for a larger, older and more visited stage, something new and grander was more fitting, and so they reinvented the visual design and created new dance choreographies. The song "The Plagues" omit the lyrics pertaining to Moses and Rameses' relationship. The song "Playing with the Big Boys" was omitted, as was the role of Huy, but the song's melody and lyrics mentioning the names of the Ancient Egyptian gods remain having been folded into the scene of the Ten Plagues instead.

=== Utah ===
The Tuacahn Amphitheatre in Ivins, Utah, also staged a production of the musical from July 13 through October 20, 2018.

=== West End ===
A significantly revised new version opened at the Dominion Theatre in London's West End for a limited 39-week engagement from February 5 to October 31, 2020, with an opening night on February 25, directed by Scott Schwartz, choreographed by Sean Cheesman, and a design team including Kevin Depinet, Ann Hould-Ward, Mike Billings, Gareth Owen, Jon Driscoll, and Chris Fisher. The West End version featured new costumes by Hould-Ward, sets by Depinet, projections by Driscoll, illusions by Fisher, sound by Owens, and hair/wigs/makeup by Campbell young Associates, as well as a world premiere song. The cast of 38 was headed by Luke Brady (Moses), Liam Tamne (Ramses), Christine Allado (Tzipporah), Alexia Khadime (Miriam), Joe Dixon (Seti), Debbie Kurup (Queen Tuya), Gary Wilmot (Jethro), Mercedesz Csampai (Yocheved), Adam Pearce (Hotep), Tanisha Spring (Nefertari) and Silas Wyatt-Barke (Aaron). The production was forced to close on March 17 after just six weeks, due to the government-mandated closure of all theatres in response to the COVID-19 pandemic in the United Kingdom. The show reopened on July 1, 2021, and concluded its run on January 8, 2022. Clive Rowe starred as Jethro from July 1 to October 16, 2021.

The production was filmed by Universal Pictures Content Group and STEAM Motion + Sound for a future broadcast, and was released in theaters on October 19, 2023 making $323,497 at the box office. The recorded performance was released on BroadwayHD on November 15 and was followed by a digital release on December 5.

=== Italy ===
On May 14, 2026 an Italian adaptation, procucted by IMARTS and Broadway Italia, premiered at Rossetti theatre in Trieste, featuring Riccardo Maccaferri as Moses, Lorenzo Tognocchi as Ramses, and Giulia Sol as Tzipporrah. Michelle Perera plays the double role of Yocheved and Miriam, while Gipeto plays both Seti and Jethro. Fabrizio Corucci is featured as Hotep, Daniela Pobega as queen Tuya, Matilde Guidotti as Nerfertari and Renato Tognocchi as Aronne. The cast is completed with Rocco Di Donato, Lorenzo Maria Giambattista, Lazaro Rojas Perez and Chiara Vergassola.

For the big crowd scenes, local artists (singles and choral groups) were contacted.

The production team consists of Federico Bellone as director and set designer, Giovanni Maria Lori as musical supervision, Elena Cicorella for costumes, hair and makeup, Valerio Tiberi for light design, and Poti Martin for sound design. Special effects are designed by Paolo Carta, and Marta Melchiorre is responsible for dance and choreografic movements.

== Musical numbers ==
Songs from the 1998 animated film are bolded.

Act I

- "**Deliver Us**" - Yocheved, Queen Tuya, Young Miriam and Company
- "Faster" - Moses, Ramses, Hotep and Priests
- "One Weak Link" - Seti
- "One Weak Link (Reprise)" - Ramses +
- "His Son And Heir" - Moses, Ramses and Ensemble +
- "Footprints on the Sand" - Moses
- "Transition To Barge" - Ensemble +
- "Seti's Return" - Egyptians
- "Dance To the Day" - Tzipporah
- "Tzipporah Escapes" - Ensemble +
- "Dance To The Day" (Reprise) - Tzipporah and Moses +
- "**All I Ever Wanted**" - Miriam, Moses, Yocheved, Seti and Queen Tuya
- "The Law Of The Gods" - Hotep, Ensemble +
- "Make It Right" - Ramses and Moses
- "Moses in the Desert" - Moses and Company
- "The Well" - Leah and Keturah +
- "**Through Heaven's Eyes**" - Jethro and Company
- "Faster (Reprise)" - Ramses and Moses
- "Never in a Million Years" - Tzipporah and Moses
- "Act I Finale: Deliver Us (Reprise) / All I Ever Wanted (Reprise)" - Hotep, Ramses, Nefertari, Queen Tuya, Moses, Jethro and Company

Act II

- "Through Heaven's Eyes (Reprise)" - Tzipporah
- "The Naming Ceremony" - Hotep and Ensemble
- "Always On Your Side" - Ramses and Moses
- "Simcha" - Moses, Miriam, Tzipporah and Company
- "Simcha (Playoff)" - Moses, Hebrews and Hotep +
- "Deliver Us (Reprise II)" - Aaron and Company
- "**The Plagues**" - Moses, Hotep, Ramses, Nefertari, Miriam, Queen Tuya, Aaron and Company
- “They Will Be Free” - Company +
- “Death of the Firstborn” - Orchestra +
- "For the Rest of My Life" - Moses
- "Heartless" - Nefertari
- "**When You Believe**" - Miriam, Tzipporah, Young Girl, Moses and Company
- "Act II Finale (Part I): Never in a Million Years (Reprise)" - Tzipporah and Moses
- "Act II Finale (Part II): When You Believe (Reprise)” - Miriam, Moses, Yocheved, Tzipporah, Company
- “Act II Finale (Part III): Footprints on the Sand (Reprise)" - Seti, Ramses, Queen Tuya, Jethro, Yocheved, Hotep, Moses, Nefertari, Tzipporah, Aaron and Company

+ Not on original cast recording

=== Cast recording ===
Playbill's cast recording of the West End production was released by Ghostlight Records on April 3, 2020. The album was nominated for a 2021 Grammy Award for Best Musical Theater Album.

== Casts ==
Character	Sag Harbor (2015)	Mountain View (2017)	West End (2020)	The Argyle Theatre (2026)
Moses	Matthew James Thomas	Diluckshan Jeyaratnam	Luke Brady	Jeffery Lee Walker III
Ramesses II	Aaron Lazar	Jason Gotay	Liam Tamne	Christian Fuentes Atherton
Tzipporah	Patina Miller	Brennyn Lark	Christine Allado	Sydney Kamel
Miriam	Julia Motyka	Julia Motyka	Alexia Khadime	Rachel Da Silva
Aaron	Kyle Barisich	David Crane	Silas Wyatt-Barke	Max Ilan
Pharaoh Seti I	Stephen Bogardus	Tom Nelis	Joe Dixon	Keith Lee Grant
Jethro	Norm Lewis	Paul-Jordan Jansen	Gary Wilmot	Juan Calix
Queen Tuya	Julia Murney	Christina Sajous	Debbie Kurup	Lauren Kidwell
High Priest Hotep	Ryan Knowles	Will Mann	Adam Pearce	Casey Martin Klein
Nefertari	Joanna Howard	Jamila Sabrares-Klemm	Tanisha Spring / Nardia Ruth	Soraiah Williams
Yocheved	Desi Oakley	Ayelet Firstenberg	Mercedesz Csampai	Chani Bentabou
High Priest Huy	John Treacy Egan	does not appear	does not appear	does not appear

== Reception ==
Unlike the film, the West End production received mixed reviews from critics, who praised the performances, score and orchestrations but criticized the costume design and script. Anthony Walker-Cook of BroadwayWorld praised the performances of Brady, Tamme and the ensemble, but felt the show was more like a pantomime than a Biblical epic. Alex Wood of WhatsOnStage was critical of the changes made to translate the film's screenplay for the stage, saying that "by adding a few extra scenes and dialogue, he makes the Pharaoh's power far less absolute, creating a murky world where pragmatic decisions have to be taken to appease warring families craving Egypt's throne ... Thankfully LaZebnik lets the pace quicken in the second act as the plagues set in and Moses battles to free his people." Alice Saville of Time Out gave it 3 stars out of 5, writing that "in its best moments, it has the rousing power of Les Misérables. But with gritty recent revivals of the likes of Jesus Christ Superstar showing that Biblical musicals can feel contemporary, this one seems stuck in the past". Arifa Akbar of The Guardian felt mixed about Scott Schwartz's directing choices, calling the production "stuffed full of imagination but it is so excessive and outsized that it overwhelms the emotional drama, sucking away any intimacy between the actors". David Benedict of Variety wrote in his review: "When, late in the first act, a genial, blessedly relaxed Gary Wilmot appears as Jethro to lead the company in song welcoming Moses back among his people, you suddenly realize what's been missing: engaging warmth ... Constantly going from zero to emotional overload, it's so effortful it's enervating."
