= Groundhog Day (musical) =

Musical based on the film of the same name

- The Musical
- Broadway promotional poster
- Music: Tim Minchin
- Lyrics: Tim Minchin
- Book: Danny Rubin
- Basis: Groundhog Day by: Danny Rubin; Harold Ramis
- Premiere: 16 August 2016: The Old Vic, London
- Productions: 2016 London; 2017 Broadway; 2023 London revival 2024 Melbourne; US regional productions International productions
- Awards: Laurence Olivier Award for Best New Musical

Groundhog Day is a musical with music and lyrics by Tim Minchin and a book by Danny Rubin. It is based on the 1993 film of the same name, directed by Harold Ramis and written by Ramis and Rubin.

It tells the story of Phil Connors, an arrogant Pittsburgh TV weatherman who, during an assignment covering the annual Groundhog Day event in Punxsutawney, Pennsylvania, finds himself in a time loop, repeating the same day again and again.

The musical made its world premiere at The Old Vic in London in summer 2016 and was nominated for eight Laurence Olivier Awards in 2017, winning for Best New Musical and Best Actor in a Leading Role in a Musical for Andy Karl; it later opened on Broadway in 2017, and was nominated for seven Tony Awards, including Best Musical and Best Actor in a Leading Role in a Musical for Karl.

== Background ==
The musical is based on the 1993 film Groundhog Day. The film itself starred Bill Murray as Phil Connors and Andie MacDowell as Rita Hanson and was produced on a budget of $14.6 million, earning over $70 million in domestic box office receipts. In 2006 it was added to the United States National Film Registry as being deemed "culturally, historically, or aesthetically significant." It was voted at number 8 in the top ten greatest films in the fantasy genre by the American Film Institute in 2006.

In August 2003, Stephen Sondheim, when asked what his next project might be, said that he was interested in the idea of a musical adaption of Groundhog Day. However, in a 2008 live chat, he said that "to make a musical of Groundhog Day would be to gild the lily. It cannot be improved." In 2009, during an interview with MTV News, Harold Ramis revealed that Danny Rubin was working on the book for a musical version of the film. Rubin affirmed he had been working on a concept of a Groundhog Day musical for some time, and already had about 12 song ideas (whittled down from 30) along with dialog, scenes, and other production aspects. Around 2012, Rubin had become stuck and felt it impossible he could make the musical happen as he believed he could not progress without the collaboration of a composer. Shortly after reaching this conclusion, Rubin was called by director Matthew Warchus to introduce him to Tim Minchin, who had just finished writing the songs for Matilda the Musical. Rubin felt Minchin's work in Matilda proved he "can write songs that are funny and moving and smart and beautiful," and the three started working on adapting Rubin's book.

The trio formally announced their partnership towards the musical in January 2014. A workshop was held in London on 12 July, and Minchin performed an early version of a song from the show; "Seeing You", during his concerts at KOKO (December 2013 along with "Night Will Come"), Hyde Park (July 2014), the steps at Sydney Opera House (February 2015).

On 2 April 2015, the musical was officially confirmed and it was announced that the show would receive its Broadway premiere in March 2017. It was later announced the musical would make its world premiere during 2016 at The Old Vic theatre in London, as part of director Matthew Warchus' debut season as artistic director of the theatre.

The musical has a book by Danny Rubin, based on his original story, and the screenplay co-written with Harold Ramis, and is directed by Matthew Warchus, with choreography by Peter Darling and Ellen Kane and design by Rob Howell. The show features an original score and lyrics by Australian comedian and lyricist Tim Minchin. The production reunites most of the creative team behind the 2010 musical Matilda.

Speaking about the musical, director Warchus said that it's "a show full of intellect, integrity and wit, insight, humor—and of course romance." Minchin, who wrote the music and lyrics for the adaptation, added, "Our version of Groundhog Day is going to be both instantly recognisable, and utterly different" and that "The central conceit is perfectly suited to the theatre... it has the potential to be complex, dark, visually fascinating, and thematically rich, whilst still being a joyous romantic comedy with cool tunes and lots of gags."

== Synopsis ==
=== Act I ===
Phil Connors, an arrogant TV weatherman, is dreading his trip to Punxsutawney, PA to report on the annual Groundhog Day Ceremony, believing it is beneath him. As his weather van arrives in town, the people of Punxsutawney are hoping that the groundhog, Punxsutawney Phil, will not see his shadow, signifying an end to winter and the start of spring ("There Will Be Sun"). The next morning, Phil wakes on 2 February full of scorn for everything and everyone he encounters on his way to Gobbler's Knob where the annual ceremony takes place. When he arrives on location he meets up with cameraman Larry and his new producer Rita before the groundhog's forecast of six more weeks of winter. While Phil and Rita eat lunch at a diner, Larry packs the van preparing for their departure, and the sheriff enters and tells them that a bad snowstorm has closed every road out of town, keeping them from leaving. Rita makes an entry in her journal before the Groundhog Day banquet and the townspeople remain ever hopeful for the coming spring ("Day One").

The next morning, Phil wakes on 2 February and confusedly relives his morning over again, including a run-in with obnoxious high school classmate Ned Ryerson. Phil begrudgingly reports on the ceremony with the same result as the day before, and Rita enjoys the festivities after commenting in her journal about Phil's odd behavior ("Day Two"). The next morning, Phil wakes on 2 February and fearing a mental breakdown ("Day Three"), consults every doctor and healer in town, none of whom is medically qualified, and all of whom suggest a variety of unusual remedies ("Stuck"). Phil decides to self-medicate at the bar instead, and finds camaraderie with two drunks who are stuck in a rut and feel that life is repetitive. The trio takes advantage of not having a future and drive recklessly on train tracks, evading the police before they are eventually caught and Phil is arrested ("Nobody Cares").

The next morning, Phil wakes on 2 February with a newfound joy as he openly treats others terribly, does as he pleases, and uses his repeated days to meet and reintroduce himself to Nancy Taylor, a local woman that he eventually manages to sleep with ("Philandering"). After settling into a hedonistic groove, Phil sets his sights on Rita, determined to sleep with her. He spends several days trying to manufacture her perfect date, and grows more manic as he invariably keeps failing. With success never in sight, Phil wonders why he couldn't repeat a better day, Rita wonders if she'll ever find someone she could love, and the townspeople wonder if they will ever do all the things they've been putting off, waiting for an idealized future ("One Day").

=== Act II ===
Nancy contemplates her behaviour patterns and how she presents herself ("Playing Nancy"). Phil arrives at Gobbler's Knob for his broadcast and interrupts his report to shoot Punxsutawney Phil and then himself. The next morning, Phil wakes on 2 February and exhausts every way to kill himself, vowing not to give up that he will one day successfully commit suicide and or escape from the time loop ("Hope"). Phil returns to the diner and with nothing to lose, tells Rita what is happening, proving his claims by spouting off facts about the townspeople, predicting their actions, and finally telling Rita things he has learned about her ("Everything About You"). Intrigued, Rita spends the day with Phil, learning various things he's done about town and theorizing what she would do in his shoes ("If I Had My Time Again"). That evening, Rita goes to the bed and breakfast Phil is staying in to see what happens when his day starts over, but falls asleep in his room before she can find out ("Everything About You (Reprise)").

The next morning, Phil wakes on 2 February, alone again and decides to engage with the townspeople and better himself, even learning to play the piano ("Philosopher"). Phil learns that Ned's wife has died, and later that evening, he finds a homeless man dead in the park, which he spends several days trying to prevent before accepting that some things are inevitable ("Night Will Come"). On a new Groundhog Day, Phil delivers a surprisingly profound broadcast before running about town all day helping townspeople ("Philanthropy"). Rita arrives at the banquet and overhears everyone in town raving about what Phil has done for them that day, only to discover he is also playing in the band ("Punxsutawney Rock"). In a bachelor auction, Rita buys a dance with Phil and kisses him, both feeling that they are only just learning what the other is like ("Seeing You"). The next morning, Phil wakes to find Rita still in his room and a fresh layer of snow covering the ground outside. Though overjoyed at finally being able to leave, Phil agrees to spend the day with Rita. They start their day with watching the sun rise in Punxsutawney on 3 February ("Dawn").

== Musical numbers ==
Act I

- "Overture" – Orchestra
- "There Will Be Sun" – Company
- "Day One" – Phil, Rita and company
- "Day Two" – Phil, Rita and company
- "Day Three" – Phil and company
- "Stuck" – Phil and healers
- "Nobody Cares" – Gus, Ralph, Phil and company
- "Philandering" – Company
- "One Day" – Rita, Phil and company

Act II

- "Entr'acte" – Orchestra
- "Playing Nancy" – Nancy
- "Hope" – Phil and company
- "Everything About You" – Phil
- "If I Had My Time Again" – Rita, Phil and company
- "Everything About You (Reprise)" – Phil
- "Philosopher" – Phil and company
- "Night Will Come" – Ned
- "Philanthropy" – Phil and company
- "Punxsutawney Rock" – Piano teacher and company
- "Seeing You" – Phil, Rita and company
- "Dawn" – Company

"Everything About You" was originally titled "I Know Everything" in the 2016 London production. "Philosopher" and "Dawn" are absent from the Broadway cast recording.

=== Orchestration ===
London (2016) - 11 musicians	Broadway (2017) - 12 musicians
Reed 1: Flute, Alto Sax, Baritone Sax; Reed 2: Clarinet, Bass Clarinet, Tenor Sax	Reed 1: Piccolo, Flute, Alto Sax, Baritone Sax; Reed 2: Clarinet, Bass Clarinet, Tenor Sax
Trumpet 1 (doubling Flugelhorn and piccolo trumpet); Trumpet 2 (doubling cornet and flugelhorn); Trombone (doubling Euphonium and bass trombone)	Trumpet 1 (doubling Flugelhorn); Trumpet 2 (doubling Cornet); Trombone (tenor and bass doubling Euphonium)
Drum Kit/Percussion	Drum and cajon
Acoustic guitar 1 (doubling electric guitar); Acoustic guitar 2 (doubling electric bass); Electric bass (doubling upright bass)	Guitar 1 (lead - acoustic and electric); Acoustic Guitar 2 (doubling Violin); Acoustic Guitar 3 (doubling Cello); Bass (acoustic and electric)
2 Keyboards	2 Keyboards

=== Original Broadway cast recording ===
The original Broadway cast album was recorded in March 2017 and was released digitally on 21 April and in stores 5 May 2017. The album is available from Broadway / Masterworks and is produced by Chris Nightingale, Michael Croiter and Tim Minchin. The songs "Hope", "If I Had My Time Again" and "Seeing You" were released prematurely to download for iTunes, Amazon.com and Spotify.

Groundhog Day The Musical

Soundtrack album cast recording by Original Broadway Cast of Groundhog Day
- Released: 21 April 2017
- Length: 76:40
- Label: Masterworks Broadway

All tracks are written by Tim Minchin (additional music and orchestrations by Chris Nightingale).

No.	Title	Length
1.	"Overture"	1:04
2.	"There Will Be Sun"	2:33
3.	"Day One"	10:20
4.	"Day Two"	4:26
5.	"Day Three"	1:40
6.	"Stuck"	3:34
7.	"Nobody Cares"	5:13
8.	"Philandering"	4:50
9.	"One Day"	8:46
10.	"Entr'acte"	0:55
11.	"Playing Nancy"	3:14
12.	"Hope"	5:30
13.	"Everything About You"	1:51
14.	"If I Had My Time Again"	4:59
15.	"Everything About You (reprise)"	1:00
16.	"Night Will Come"	3:48
17.	"Philanthropy"	5:03
18.	"Punxsutawney Rock"	1:39
19.	"Seeing You"	6:32
Total length:		76:40

== Production history ==
=== World premiere: London (2016) ===
The musical made its world premiere at The Old Vic in London as part of Matthew Warchus' first season as artistic director. It was scheduled to begin previews on 11 July 2016 (however initial previews were cancelled due to technical issues until 16 July with 15 July being an open final dress rehearsal), with its official opening night coming on 16 August, booking for a limited period until 17 September 2016, with an extra performance added on 19 September 2016. Andy Karl made his London debut starring the lead role of Phil Connors with Carlyss Peer as Rita and Eugene McCoy as Larry.

The production was nominated for 8 Laurence Olivier Awards. On 9 April 2017, it won the Olivier Awards for Best New Musical and Best Actor in a Musical for Andy Karl.

=== Broadway (2017) ===
The musical had originally been scheduled to transfer to Broadway in January 2017, however Playbill reported on 22 June 2016, that the musical "may not make it to Broadway in January 2017" because the lead producer Scott Rudin had withdrawn from the production during the rehearsals of the London run. After the opening night of the production at The Old Vic in London, The New York Times revealed that the production was still intended to transfer to Broadway, produced by André Ptaszynski and Lia Vollack with Whistle Pig and Columbia Live Stage.

The musical premiered on Broadway at the August Wilson Theatre officially on 17 April 2017 with Karl reprising the role of Phil Connors and a new cast including Barrett Doss as Rita. The first scheduled preview on 16 March had to be stopped after approximately 15 minutes due to technical difficulties with the revolving stage. The performance continued as a concert for the rest of act one, with a sing-through of 6 songs after intermission using no technical components.

On the preview on the evening of 14 April, Karl injured himself onstage during the number "Philanthropy" tearing his anterior cruciate ligament, but he continued the performance with a cane. The matinee on 15 April was cancelled to allow his understudy Andrew Call (who usually played Gus) to rehearse for the evening performance. Despite his injury, Karl returned for the production's opening night on 17 April, receiving high praise in the reviews. He performed four performances in the week commencing 17 April to recover from his injury.

On 21 April, Andie MacDowell (who played Rita in the film) attended the performance, and on 8 August, Bill Murray (who played Phil Connors in the film) attended a performance with his brother Brian Doyle-Murray (who played Buster Green in the film). Bill Murray returned to watch the performance the following night.

The Broadway production closed on 17 September 2017, after 176 performances and 32 previews. An 18-month national tour beginning in 2018 had been planned. On 8 January 2018, Minchin posted to his Twitter account that "Sadly (despicably) there'll be no US tour".

=== London revival (2023) ===
The musical was revived at The Old Vic in London with Karl reprising the role of Phil Connors with previews beginning on 20 May 2023, with a press night on 8 June running for a limited run until 12 August 2023. The staging of the production had become simplified due to the removal of the revolving stage and the production featured new revisions and choreography by Lizzi Gee. The cast also included Tanisha Spring as Rita and Andrew Langtree (reprising his role from the original 2016 London cast) as Ned Ryerson. The production extended by an additional week, through to 19 August 2023.

On 17 August 2023, it was revealed that the production had become the highest-grossing production in the Old Vic's history attracting 90,000 audience members during its run (following the 65,000 during the original 2016 run). It was nominated for Best Musical Revival at the 2024 Laurence Olivier Awards.

=== Melbourne (2024) ===
The London production made its Australian premiere at the Princess Theatre in Melbourne for a limited season beginning previews in January 2024. Casting was announced on 2 December 2023 including Karl reprising the role of Phil Connors from the London and Broadway productions and Elise McCann as Rita Hanson.

The official opening night of the musical was held on 1 February 2024, and featured a blue carpet and musical ensemble outside the theatre. This was kept for the performance on the following night, on the actual Groundhog Day holiday. The run was extended until 20 April 2024.

=== Canada (2025) ===
The non-replica Canadian production, co-directed by Cameron Carver and Andrew Tribe, was performed at the Yes Theatre in Sudbury, Ontario from 12 February to 9 March 2025.

=== US regional productions ===
In May 2018, Music Theatre International announced that it had acquired the rights to the musical, allowing the company to provide production licenses to regional theaters worldwide.

The first professional non-replica regional production was performed at San Francisco Playhouse in November 2019, directed by Susi Damilano, with Ryan Drummond in the role of Phil. The production ran from 20 November 2019 to 18 January 2020.

=== International productions ===
A non-replica Swedish production presented by Wermland Opera in Karlstad opened 27 February running until 17 May 2020 (however due to the coronavirus pandemic, performances were cancelled from 16 March to 21 April).

A new Finnish production ran at the Helsinki City Theatre (Finnish: Helsingin Kaupunginteatteri) from 25 August until 31 December 2020.

A Catalan-language production ran from 23 December 2024, to 22 March 2025, at the Teatre Coliseum in Barcelona, starring Roc Bernadí.

A Japanese production opened at the Tokyo International Forum, Shinkabukiza in Osaka and Misonoza in Aichi in November and December 2024.

== Cast and characters ==
The characters and original cast:

Character	London	Broadway	London revival	Melbourne
Character	2016	2017	2023	2024
Phil Connors	Andy Karl	Andy Karl	Andy Karl	Andy Karl
Rita Hanson	Carlyss Peer	Barrett Doss	Tanisha Spring	Elise McCann
Larry	Eugene McCoy	Vishal Vaidya	Ashlee Irish	Kaya Byrne
Ned Ryerson	Andrew Langtree	John Sanders	Andrew Langtree	Tim Wright
Nancy	Georgina Hagen	Rebecca Faulkenberry	Eve Norris	Ashleigh Rubenach
Mrs. Lancaster	Julie Jupp	Heather Ayers	Annie Wensak	Alison Whyte
Fred	Kieran Jae	Gerard Canonico	Billy Nevers	Jacob Steen
Debbie	Jenny O'Leary	Katy Geraghty	Kamilla Fernandes	Afua Adjei
Joelle	Carolyn Maitland	Jenna Rubaii	Aimée Fisher	Kate Yaxley
Ralph	Jack Shalloo	Raymond J. Lee	Nick Hayes	Connor Sweeney
Gus	Andrew Spillett	Andrew Call	Chris Jenkins	Conor Neylon
Doris	Emma Lindars	Rheaume Crenshaw	—N/a	—N/a
Buster	Mark Pollard	Josh Lamon	Ben Redfern	Andrew Dunne
Sheriff	Antonio Magro	Sean Montgomery	Mark Pearce	Matthew Hamilton
Deputy	Roger Dipper	Joseph Medeiros	Durone Stokes	Etuate Lutui
Jeff	Ste Clough	Travis Waldschmidt	—N/a	—N/a
Jenson	Leo Andrew	William Parry	Jez Unwin	Michael Linder
Chubby Man	David Birch	Michael Fatica	—N/a	—N/a
Piano Teacher	Kirsty Malpass	Tari Kelly	Jacqueline Hughes	Kate Cole
Lady Storm Chaser	Vicki Lee Taylor	Taylor Iman Jones	—N/a	—N/a

The dance captain and assistant dance captain for the Old Vic production were Leanne Pinder and Damien Poole, respectively. For the Broadway production, Camden Gonzales was the dance captain while Michael Fatica was the assistant dance captain.

== Critical reception ==
The original London production was received positively, opening to a string of five-star reviews.

The Broadway production also received mostly positive reviews, particularly praising Andy Karl for returning to the production despite his earlier injury.

The Melbourne production similarly received much critical acclaim, with praise of Karl's performance and his chemistry with McCann, along with the local cast.

== Awards and nominations ==
=== Original London production ===
Year	Award	Category	Nominee	Result
2016	Evening Standard Theatre Award	Best Musical		Nominated
2016	Evening Standard Theatre Award	Best Musical Performance	Andy Karl	Nominated
2016	Evening Standard Theatre Award	Best Design	Rob Howell	Nominated
2016	Critics' Circle Theatre Award	Best Musical		Won
2017	Laurence Olivier Award	Best New Musical		Won
2017	Laurence Olivier Award	Best Actor in a Leading Role in a Musical	Andy Karl	Won
2017	Laurence Olivier Award	Best Actor in a Supporting Role in a Musical	Andrew Langtree	Nominated
2017	Laurence Olivier Award	Best Director	Matthew Warchus	Nominated
2017	Laurence Olivier Award	Best Theatre Choreographer	Peter Darling and Ellen Kane	Nominated
2017	Laurence Olivier Award	Best Costume Design	Rob Howell	Nominated
2017	Laurence Olivier Award	Best Set Design	Rob Howell	Nominated
2017	Laurence Olivier Award	Best Lighting Design	Hugh Vanstone	Nominated

=== Original Broadway production ===
Year	Award	Category	Nominee	Result
2017	Tony Award	Best Musical		Nominated
2017	Tony Award	Best Actor in a Leading Role in a Musical	Andy Karl	Nominated
2017	Tony Award	Best Direction of a Musical	Matthew Warchus	Nominated
2017	Tony Award	Best Book of a Musical	Danny Rubin	Nominated
2017	Tony Award	Best Original Score	Tim Minchin	Nominated
2017	Tony Award	Best Choreography	Peter Darling and Ellen Kane	Nominated
2017	Tony Award	Best Scenic Design in a Musical	Rob Howell	Nominated
2017	Drama Desk Award	Outstanding Actor in a Leading Role in a Musical	Andy Karl	Won
2017	Drama League Award	Best Musical		Nominated
2017	Drama League Award	Distinguished Performance	Andy Karl	Nominated
2017	Outer Critics Circle Award	Outstanding New Broadway Musical		Nominated
2017	Outer Critics Circle Award	Outstanding Actor in a Leading Role in a Musical	Andy Karl	Won
2017	Outer Critics Circle Award	Outstanding Director of a Musical	Matthew Warchus	Nominated
2017	Outer Critics Circle Award	Outstanding Book of a Musical	Danny Rubin	Nominated
2017	Outer Critics Circle Award	Outstanding New Score of a Musical	Tim Minchin	Nominated
2017	Chita Rivera Award	Outstanding Choreography in a Broadway Show	Peter Darling and Ellen Kane	Nominated
2017	Theatre World Award		Barrett Doss	Honouree

=== 2023 London revival ===
Year	Award	Category	Nominee	Result
2024	Laurence Olivier Award	Best Musical Revival		Nominated

== Notes ==
1.Michael Motroni and Danielle Philapil shared the role of the Storm Chaser as part of the regional San Francisco production.
2.Matthew Malthouse covered the role of the Hot Dog Vendor as part of his Swing track in the London production. The role has been renamed for the Broadway production, but according to cast members' social media, Kevin Bernard is still considered part of the Swing team for the production.
