= Liam Tamne =

English actor and singer

- Born: Liam Connor Tamne; 30 November 1985 (age 40); Coventry, England
- Education: Laine Theatre Arts
- Years active: 2008–present
- Spouse: Mike Jaycock (m. 2016)
- Website: liamtamne.co.uk

Liam Connor Jaycock-Tamne (né Tamne; born 30 November 1985) is an English actor and singer. He is known for his work on the West End stage.

== Early life ==
Liam Connor Tamne was born in Coventry to a Kenyan-Indian father and a mother from Belfast and grew up in Mount Nod. He has two brothers.

Tamne attended Potters Green Primary School and Cardinal Wiseman School. As a teenager, he joined the Coventry Cathedral Choir, Coventry Youth Operetta and Belgrade Youth Theatre and took classes at the Allesley School of Dance. He went on to graduate from Laine Theatre Arts.

== Career ==
In 2008, Tamne replaced Dougal Irvine as the first understudy for Fiyero in the West End cast of Wicked at the Apollo Victoria Theatre. In 2009, he joined the West End cast of Hairspray as Link Larkin at the Shaftesbury Theatre. The following year, he originated the role of Jordan Jones in Departure Lounge at the Waterloo East Theatre and appeared in Hair at the Gielgud Theatre. He next took over the role of Enjolras in Les Misérables at the Queen's Theatre.

In 2013, Tamne competed in the second series of The Voice UK, auditioning with Kate Bush's "This Woman's Work". Invited to join will.i.am's team, Tamne was eliminated in the Battle rounds.

Tamne returned to the West End in 2014 when he began playing Raoul in The Phantom of the Opera at Her Majesty's Theatre. He went on the 2016 UK tour of The Rocky Horror Show as Frank N Furter. He appeared in Working at Southwark Playhouse in 2017.

In 2018, Tamne was a Eurovision: You Decide hopeful with an original song titled "Astronaut". He also portrayed Lin-Manuel Miranda in the parody musical Spamilton at the Menier Chocolate Factory. The following year, Tamne played Guiseppe Naccarelli in The Light in the Piazza at the Southbank Centre.

Tamne's next role was Ramses in the West End production of The Prince of Egypt at the Dominion Theatre. The show opened in February 2020 but closed weeks later due to the COVID-19 lockdown. It reopened in July 2021. The cast recording, which included Tamne, was nominated for Best Musical Theater Album at the Grammy Awards. For his performance, Tamne was nominated for a Black British Theatre Award.

In 2022, Tamne starred as Heathcliff in Emma Rice's adaptation of Wuthering Heights at the National Theatre and on tour in the UK and U.S., taking over the role from Ash Hunter. He also took part in the Bonnie & Clyde concert. He appeared in Assassins as Balladeer at Chichester Festival Theatre in 2023 and returned to the Menier Chocolate Factory for The Baker's Wife in 2024, playing Barnaby.

Tamne originated Fred and Carl in Alfred Hitchcock Presents at the Theatre Royal, Bath in 2025 and made his Off Broadway debut in took over the lead role of Alexander McQueen in the play House of McQueen in New York from Luke Newton. Tamne took part in the Jo cast recording and semi-staged London premiere.

== Personal life ==
Tamne married Michael "Mike" Jaycock in September 2016 at the Chateau de Bézyl in Brittany.

== Stage ==
Year	Title	Role	Notes
2008	Wicked	Ensemble / cover Fiyero	Apollo Victoria Theatre, London
2009	Hairspray	Link Larkin	Shaftesbury Theatre, London
2010	Departure Lounge	Jordan Jones	Waterloo East Theatre, London
2010	Hair	Electric Blues Tribe	Gielgud Theatre, London
2011	Les Misérables	Enjolras	Queen's Theatre, London
2014	The Phantom of the Opera	Raoul de Chagny	Her Majesty's Theatre, London
2016	The Rocky Horror Show	Frank N Furter	UK tour
2017	Working	Various	Southwark Playhouse, London
2018	Spamilton	Lin-Manuel Miranda	Menier Chocolate Factory, London
2019	The Light in the Piazza	Guiseppe Naccarelli	Southbank Centre, London
2020, 2021–2022	The Prince of Egypt	Ramses	Dominion Theatre, London
2022	Bonnie & Clyde	Ted Hinton	Concert, Theatre Royal, Drury Lane
2022	Wuthering Heights	Heathcliff	National Theatre, London / tour
2023	Assassins	Balladeer	Chichester Festival Theatre
2024	Redcliffe	Richard	Workshop, The Other Palace, London
2024	The Baker's Wife	Balladeer	Menier Chocolate Factory, London
2025	Alfred Hitchcock Presents	Fred & Carl	Theatre Royal, Bath
2025	House of McQueen	Alexander McQueen	Mansion at Hudson Yards, New York
2025–2026	Jo	John Brooke	Theatre Royal, Drury Lane

== Awards and nominations ==
Year	Award	Category	Work	Result	Ref.
2021	Grammy Awards	Best Musical Theater Album	The Prince of Egypt	Nominated	(Note: Shared with cast.)
2021	Black British Theatre Awards	Best Male Actor in a Musical	The Prince of Egypt	Nominated	
