= Andy Karl =

American actor and singer (born 1974)

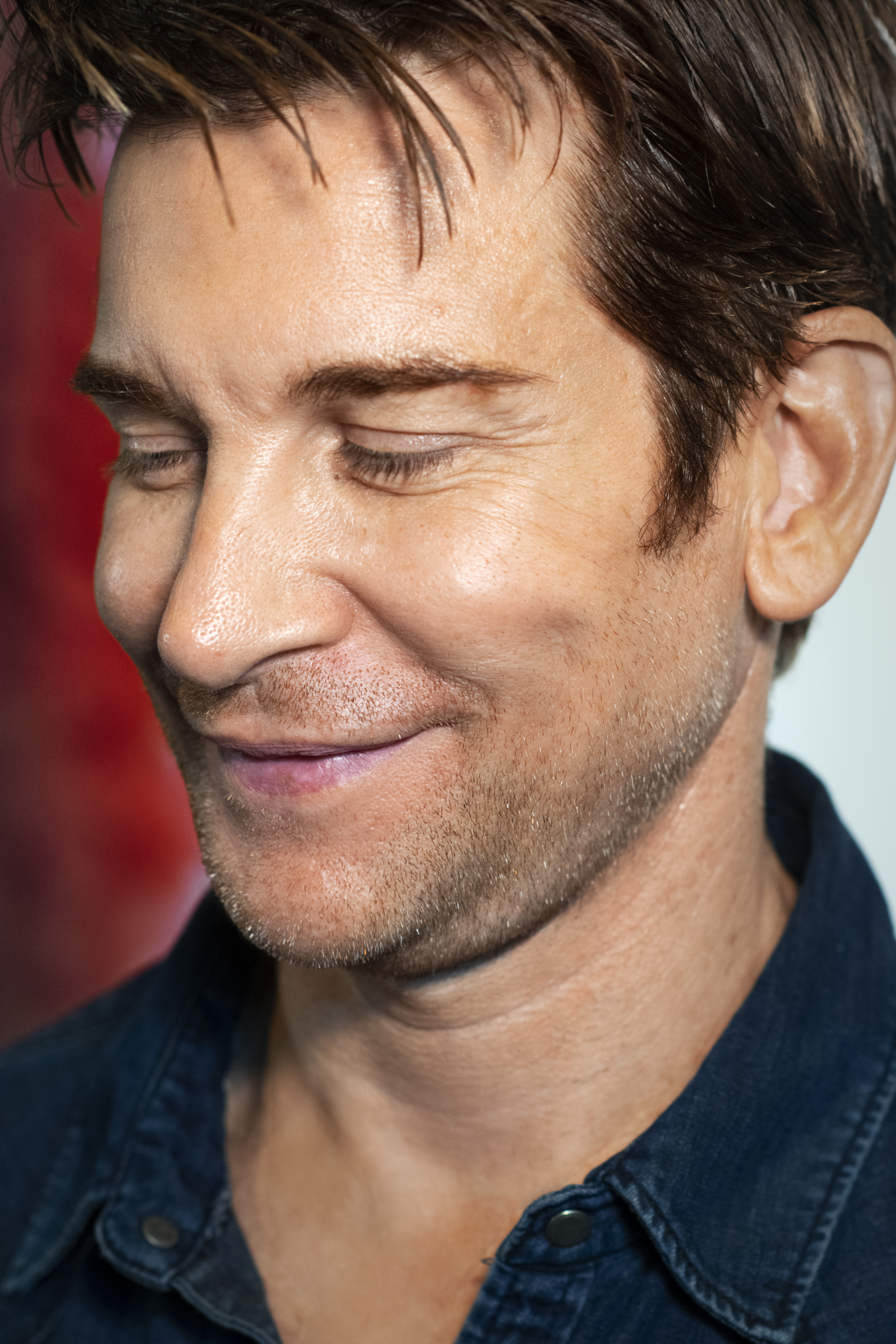
- Karl in 2022
- Born: Andrew Karl Cesewski; August 27, 1974 (age 52); Baltimore, Maryland, U.S.
- Education: Towson High School
- Alma mater: Towson University
- Occupations: Actor; singer; dancer
- Years active: 1995–present
- Known for: Groundhog Day; Legally Blonde; Rocky the Musical
- Spouse: Orfeh (m. 2001; sep. 2024)
- Website: andykarl.com

Andy Karl (born August 27, 1974 as Andrew Karl Cesewski) is an American actor and singer. He is best known for performing in musical theatre. He has received several accolades, including a Laurence Olivier Award and a Drama Desk Award as well as nominations for three Tony Awards. He is also known for playing Sgt. Mike Dodds on Law & Order: Special Victims Unit from 2015 to 2016.

Karl made his Broadway debut as a replacement in the musical Saturday Night Fever (1999). He went on to receive three Tony Award nominations for his roles in Rocky (2014), On the Twentieth Century (2015), and Groundhog Day (2017), the latter of which earned him the Olivier Award for his performance in the original London production. Karl originated the roles of Kyle in Legally Blonde (2007–2008), Joe in 9 to 5 (2009), Neville Landless / Mr. Victor Grinstead in the revival of The Mystery of Edwin Drood (2012–2013), and Edward Lewis in Pretty Woman: The Musical (2018–2019). Karl also was a replacement actor in the Broadway productions of Wicked (2010–2011), Jersey Boys (2011–2013), Into the Woods (2022), and Moulin Rouge! (2025).

== Early life ==
Karl was born on August 28, 1974 in Baltimore, Maryland, to Walter Cesewski and Susan Weisman. He attended Towson High School, where he was on the football team and performed in theater. In high school, he played Jud Fry in Oklahoma! and General Bullmoose in Li'l Abner. At age 16 he performed as the title role in Aladdin at the White Marsh Dinner Theatre. After high school, he attended Towson University, where he studied voice and music. Karl originally planned on becoming a voice teacher, until the director of a show he was in at college told him he had what it took to be a professional actor. Karl continued to perform in shows while in college. He changed his name to Karl to honor his late great-grandfather, Andrew Karl, a Baltimore fireman. In Winter 1993–1994, he played the 9-foot dragon in the children's musical The Reluctant Dragon at Toby's Dinner Theatre in Columbia, Maryland.

== Career ==
=== 1994–2006: Early roles and Broadway debut ===
Karl moved to New York in 1994. He was an understudy in the touring cast of The Who's Tommy and in 1998 played Rum Tum Tugger in the touring cast of Cats. In February 2000 Karl was an understudy in the New York premiere of Stephen Sondheim's Saturday Night at the Second Stage Theatre. He made his Broadway debut in 2000 as the replacement for Joey in Saturday Night Fever. He continued with the production, this time in the role of Tony Manero, in its first national tour. In 2001 he performed in the musical stage production Me and Mrs. Jones at the Prince Music Theater in Philadelphia.

Karl was next seen as Dino Del Canto in the world premiere of the musical Romeo and Bernadette at the Coconut Grove Playhouse in Miami, Florida. The show, which ran in January 2003, garnered Karl a Carbonell Award for Best Actor in a musical. He reprised the role at the Paper Mill Playhouse in Millburn, New Jersey in February and March, 2003.

Karl was also seen at the Paper Mill Playhouse in June and July of that year, when he performed as Danny Zuko in Grease. In January 2004 he performed in the musical revue Nights on Broadway II at Caesar's Palace in Atlantic City, New Jersey. In September 2004, Karl played Luke in the premiere of Altar Boyz at the New York Musical Theatre Festival. He then left the New York area to tour in the original company of Disney's On the Record. Karl returned to New York to play Luke in the Off-Broadway production of Altar Boyz, which opened on March 1, 2005 at Stage 4 of Dodger Stages (now New World Stages).

On September 26, 2005, Karl performed in the Actor's Fund Concert production of On the Twentieth Century. Karl's next role was the title character Adam Patterson in the Off-Broadway musical Slut at the American Theatre of Actors in Fall 2005. In January 2006 Karl was in the three-person cast of Hunka Hunka Burnin' Love, a celebration of the music of Elvis Presley, at the now-closed Au Bar. In June and July of that year, he starred as Tad in the musical Bright Lights, Big City at the Prince Music Theater in Philadelphia. He then joined the Broadway cast of The Wedding Singer at the Al Hirschfeld Theatre, where he played the roles of Drunk Dave and Bad Haircut Guy until the show closed at the end of 2006.

=== 2007–2015: Further Broadway roles, Tony nominations, and Law & Order: SVU ===
Karl's next role was in Legally Blonde, where he played Kyle "the UPS guy", Dewey, and Grandmaster Chad at the Golden Gate Theatre in San Francisco, where the musical had its pre-Broadway tryout from January 23 to February 24, 2007. He reprised his roles in the Broadway production, which started previews on April 3 and opened on April 29, 2007, at the Palace Theatre. He left the show on July 20, 2008.

Karl briefly left Legally Blonde in June 2007 to work on 9 to 5 in its week-long workshop. After leaving Legally Blonde, Karl continued working on 9 to 5 as Joe at the Ahmanson Theatre in Los Angeles from September 3 to October 19, 2008. The show opened on Broadway on April 30, 2009, at the Marquis Theatre, and closed on September 6, 2009.

Karl took over the role of Fiyero from Kevin Kern in the Broadway production of Wicked on February 2, 2010 and played the role until January 2, 2011. He took over the role Tommy Devito in the Broadway production of Jersey Boys on October 11, 2011.

Karl played Neville Landless in the Broadway revival of The Mystery of Edwin Drood which opened on November 29, 2012, at Studio 54. For this performance, he was nominated for the Drama Desk Award for Outstanding Featured Actor in a Musical.

Karl and Margo Seibert were featured as Rocky Balboa and Adrian in the new Lynn Ahrens and Stephen Flaherty musical Rocky the Musical, which opened on Broadway in February 2014. In order to get into shape to play Rocky Balboa, Karl put on 12 pounds of muscle and worked with a trainer to get to a heavyweight fighter's weight. Karl received a nomination for the Tony Award for Best Leading Actor in a Musical for this performance.

Karl played the role of Bruce Granit in the 2015 Broadway revival of On the Twentieth Century He received a nomination for the Tony Award for Best Featured Actor in a Musical for his performance. In 2015, Karl appeared in Law & Order: Special Victims Unit in the recurring role of sergeant Mike Dodds, the son of Chief William Dodds.

=== 2016–present: Groundhog Day and international prominence ===
Karl played the starring role of Phil in the musical adaptation of Groundhog Day at The Old Vic in London from July 11, 2016 until September 17, 2016. Karl then reprised the role in the Broadway production of Groundhog Day, which opened on April 17, 2017. For his performance in Groundhog Day in London, he received the 2017 Olivier Award for Best Actor in a Musical.

He starred as Edward Lewis in the Broadway production of Pretty Woman: The Musical as a replacement. In February 2020, he played Potiphar in the Off-Broadway 50th anniversary concert version of Joseph and the Amazing Technicolor Dreamcoat, opposite his wife Orfeh as Potiphar's Wife. In 2021, he reprised his Jersey Boys role in a ProShot taping of the musical.

Karl played the roles of the Big Bad Wolf and Cinderella's Prince from September 6 to 15 in a 2022 Broadway revival of Into the Woods filling in for Gavin Creel at the St. James Theatre. He returned to the production from October 11 to December 2, as Rapunzel's Prince. He reprised the role of Rapunzel's Prince during the opening weekend of the U.S. national tour's engagement in Washington, D.C., at the Kennedy Center.

From May to August 2023, he reprised the role of Phil in Groundhog Day at The Old Vic in London. From January to April 2024, he reprised the role again at the Princess Theatre in Melbourne, Australia.

From January to July 2025, in Moulin Rouge! The Musical, Karl played The Duke of Monroth at the Al Hirschfeld Theatre on Broadway.

In November 2025, Karl starred in Beetlejuice as Beetlejuice at the Etihad Arena in the United Arab Emirates. From March 10 to May 24, 2026, Karl joined the Off-Broadway revival cast of Little Shop of Horrors as Orin Scrivello. In the summer and fall of 2026, Karl reprised the role of Beetlejuice for a expected full tour of Australia. Karl only performed in Melbourne and Brisbane before the tour got cancelled.

== Personal life ==
Karl met his former wife Orfeh while in the musical for Saturday Night Fever. They were married in January 2001 and resided in Manhattan. In addition to Saturday Night Fever, Karl and his former wife have performed together in Me and Mrs. Jones, Nights on Broadway II, Bright Lights, Big City, Legally Blonde, Pretty Woman: The Musical, and Joseph and the Amazing Technicolor Dreamcoat. By May 2024, they had separated after 23 years of marriage. Shortly after, Karl confirmed his relationship with Groundhog Day co-star Elise McCann, which started while he was still with Orfeh. Many ushers witnessed the two having their affair during the Australian season of Groundhog Day outside the Princess Theatre. The two announced that they have become engaged to be married on July 28th, 2025, and they are expecting a child.

== Acting credits ==
=== Film ===
Film
Year	Title	Role	Notes
2008	New York, I Love You	Zoe's Boyfriend	Uncredited role
2012	Joyful Noise	Caleb	
2014	And So It Goes	Ted	
2016	Little Men	Unknown	Uncredited role
2020	Here After	Michael	
2025	Atrabilious	Greg Meyers	
TBA	Jersey Boys	Tommy DeVito	Proshot recording of stage musical

=== Television ===
Television
Year	Title	Role	Notes
2007	Legally Blonde: The Musical	Dewey/Kyle/Grandmaster Chad/Ensemble	TV film
2015	Forever	Sean Moore	Episode: "Diamonds Are Forever"
2015–16	Law & Order: Special Victims Unit	Sgt. Mike Dodds	Recurring role (15 episodes)
2020	Prodigal Son	Joseph	Episode: "Scheherazade"
2021	No Activity	Yohan (voice)	Episode: "Magnolia"
2021	The Good Fight	Jesse McFinley	Episode: "And the Fight Had a Détente..."
2022	Blue Bloods	Will Farmer	Episode: "Where We Stand"
2022	Gossip Girl	Guest Singer	Episode: "How to Bury a Millionaire"

=== Theatre ===
Year	Title	Role	Venue	Ref.
1995–1996	The Who's Tommy	Officer #2 / Local Lad u/s Tommy / Kevin	Tour	
1998	Cats	The Rum Tum Tugger (replacement)	US National Tour	
2000	Saturday Night	Messrs Vlastnik / Washington / Thorell	Second Stage Theatre, Off-Broadway	
2000	Saturday Night Fever	Joey u/s Tony (replacement)	Minskoff Theatre, Broadway	
2003	Romeo and Bernadette	Dino Del Canto	Paper Mill Playhouse; Coconut Grove Playhouse	
2003	Grease	Danny Zuko	Paper Mill Playhouse, Regional	
2004–2005	On the Record	Quartet member	First national tour	
2005–2006	Altar Boyz	Luke	New World Stages, Off-Broadway	
2005	Slut	Adam	American Theater of Actors	
2005	On the Twentieth Century	Porter	New Amsterdam Theatre, Broadway Concert	
2006	Bright Lights, Big City	Tad	Prince Music Theater	
2006	The Wedding Singer	David Fonda / Bad Haircut Guy u/s Glen Guglia (replacement)	Al Hirschfeld Theatre, Broadway	
2007–2008	Legally Blonde	Chad / Dewey / Kyle / Ensemble u/s Emmett Forrest / Professor Callahan	Palace Theatre, Broadway	
2009	9 to 5	Joe	Marquis Theatre, Broadway	
2010–2011	Wicked	Fiyero Tigelaar (replacement)	Gershwin Theatre, Broadway	
2011–2012	Jersey Boys	Tommy DeVito (replacement)	August Wilson Theatre, Broadway	
2012–2013	The Mystery of Edwin Drood	Neville Landless / Mr. Victor Grinstead	Studio 54, Broadway	
2013	Jersey Boys	Tommy DeVito (replacement)	August Wilson Theatre, Broadway	
2014	Rocky the Musical	Rocky Balboa	Winter Garden Theatre, Broadway	
2014	Waitress	Earl Hunterson	American Repertory Theater, Workshop	
2015	On the Twentieth Century	Bruce Granit	American Airlines Theatre, Broadway	
2016	Groundhog Day	Phil Connors	The Old Vic, London	
2017	Groundhog Day	Phil Connors	August Wilson Theatre, Broadway	
2018–2019	Pretty Woman: The Musical	Edward Lewis	Nederlander Theatre, Broadway	
2020	Joseph and the Amazing Technicolor Dreamcoat	Potiphar	David Geffen Hall, Concert	
2022	Into the Woods	The Wolf / Cinderella’s Prince (replacement)	St. James Theatre, Broadway	
2022	Into the Woods	Rapunzel's Prince (replacement)	St. James Theatre, Broadway	
2023	Into the Woods	Rapunzel's Prince (replacement)	Kennedy Center / US National Tour	
2023	Groundhog Day	Phil Connors	The Old Vic, London	
2024	Groundhog Day	Phil Connors	Princess Theatre, Australia	
2024–2025	Teeth	Pastor Bill O'Keefe	New World Stages, Off-Broadway	
2025	Moulin Rouge! The Musical	The Duke of Monroth (replacement)	Al Hirschfeld Theatre, Broadway	
2025	Beetlejuice	Beetlejuice	Etihad Arena, United Arab Emirates	
2026	Little Shop of Horrors	Orin Scrivello & Others (replacement)	Westside Theatre, Off-Broadway	
2026	Beetlejuice	Beetlejuice	Australian tour	
2026-2027	A Christmas Carol	Ebenezer Scrooge	Perelman Performing Arts Center, Off-Broadway	

== Awards and nominations ==
Year	Award	Category	Work	Result
2013	Drama Desk Award	Outstanding Featured Actor in a Musical	The Mystery of Edwin Drood	Nominated
2013	Broadway.com Audience Awards	Favorite Onstage Pair (with Jessie Mueller)	The Mystery of Edwin Drood	Nominated
2014	Tony Award	Best Actor in a Musical	Rocky	Nominated
2014	Drama Desk Award	Outstanding Actor in a Musical	Rocky	Nominated
2014	Drama League Award	Distinguished Performance	Rocky	Nominated
2014	Outer Critics Circle Award	Outstanding Actor in a Musical	Rocky	Nominated
2014	Astaire Award	Outstanding Male Dancer in a Broadway Show	Rocky	Nominated
2015	Tony Award	Best Featured Actor in a Musical	On the Twentieth Century	Nominated
2015	Drama Desk Award	Outstanding Featured Actor in a Musical	On the Twentieth Century	Nominated
2015	Drama League Award	Distinguished Performance	On the Twentieth Century	Nominated
2015	Outer Critics Circle Award	Outstanding Featured Actor in a Musical	On the Twentieth Century	Won
2016	Evening Standard Award	Best Musical Performance	Groundhog Day	Nominated
2017	Laurence Olivier Award	Best Actor in a Musical	Groundhog Day	Won
2017	The Stage Debut Award	Best West End Debut	Groundhog Day	Nominated
2017	Tony Award	Best Actor in a Musical	Groundhog Day	Nominated
2017	Drama Desk Award	Outstanding Actor in a Musical	Groundhog Day	Won
2017	Drama League Award	Distinguished Performance	Groundhog Day	Nominated
2017	Outer Critics Circle Award	Outstanding Actor in a Musical	Groundhog Day	Won
2023	Broadway.com Audience Choice Awards	Favorite Replacement (Male)	Into the Woods	Nominated
