= Kings Cross Theatre =

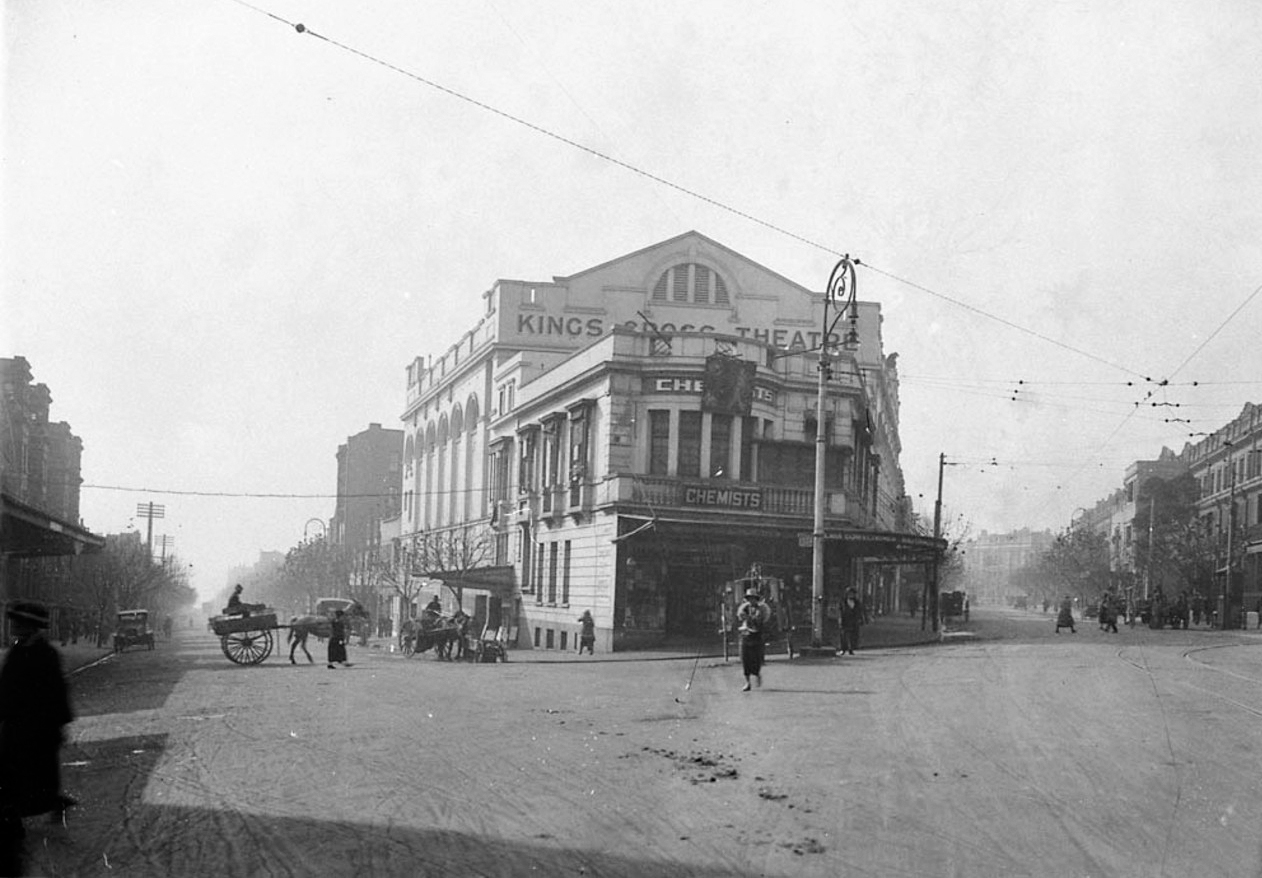

- Location in central Sydney
- Address: Victoria and Darlinghurst Road
- Location: Sydney
- Coordinates: 33.8744°S 151.2225°E
- Owner: Waddingtons
- Type: Movie theatre

Construction
- Opened: 14 April 1916
- Closed: 1966

The Kings Cross Theatre was located at the corner of Darlinghurst Road and Victoria Street, Sydney, between 1916 and 1966.

== History ==
The Kings Cross Theatre and opened on Friday 14 April 1916. The Theatre was managed by Waddigton's and boasted 2000 seats, a new ventilation system and beautifully decorated stage. The Secret Orchard starring Blanche Sweet was chosen for the opening night and within a few weeks its nightly showings became a popular venue for Sydneysiders.

In August 1928 the theatre was renovated to increase its seating capacity and install a Wurlitzer orchestral organ. The total amount for the alterations and additions to the theatre was £15.000. The addition of the Grand Wurlitzer was of some importance at the time as Waddington's engaged Joseph Wayne from America to play the organ augmented with an orchestra. The theatre underwent further renovations in 1935 to extend the seating and redecorate the interior.

In 1963 the theatre was closed and the Proclamation published in the Government Gazette of 20 April 1916 was revoked. Between 1963 and 1966 the site was occupied by John Harrigan's Surf City. The building was demolished in 1966 and replaced by the Crest Hotel.

Not far on same side along Darlighurst Road to the north was the Kings Cross News Reel. Contrary to its name, in the 1950s this 298-seat upstairs joint, managed by K F E Cook, showed feature films of the vintage variety.

== Gallery ==
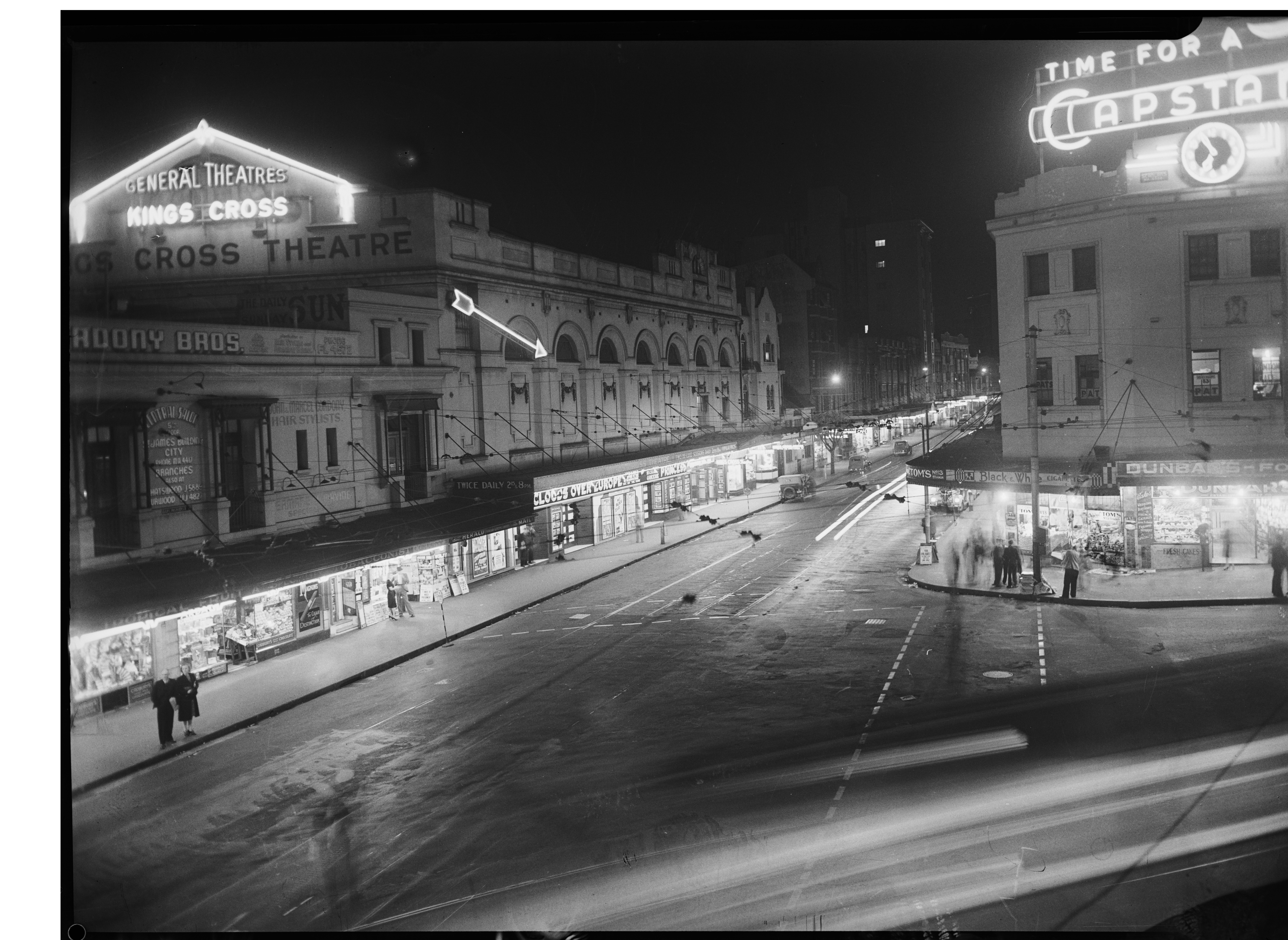
King's Cross Theatre (night time), Darlinghurst Road, Sydney, 1939

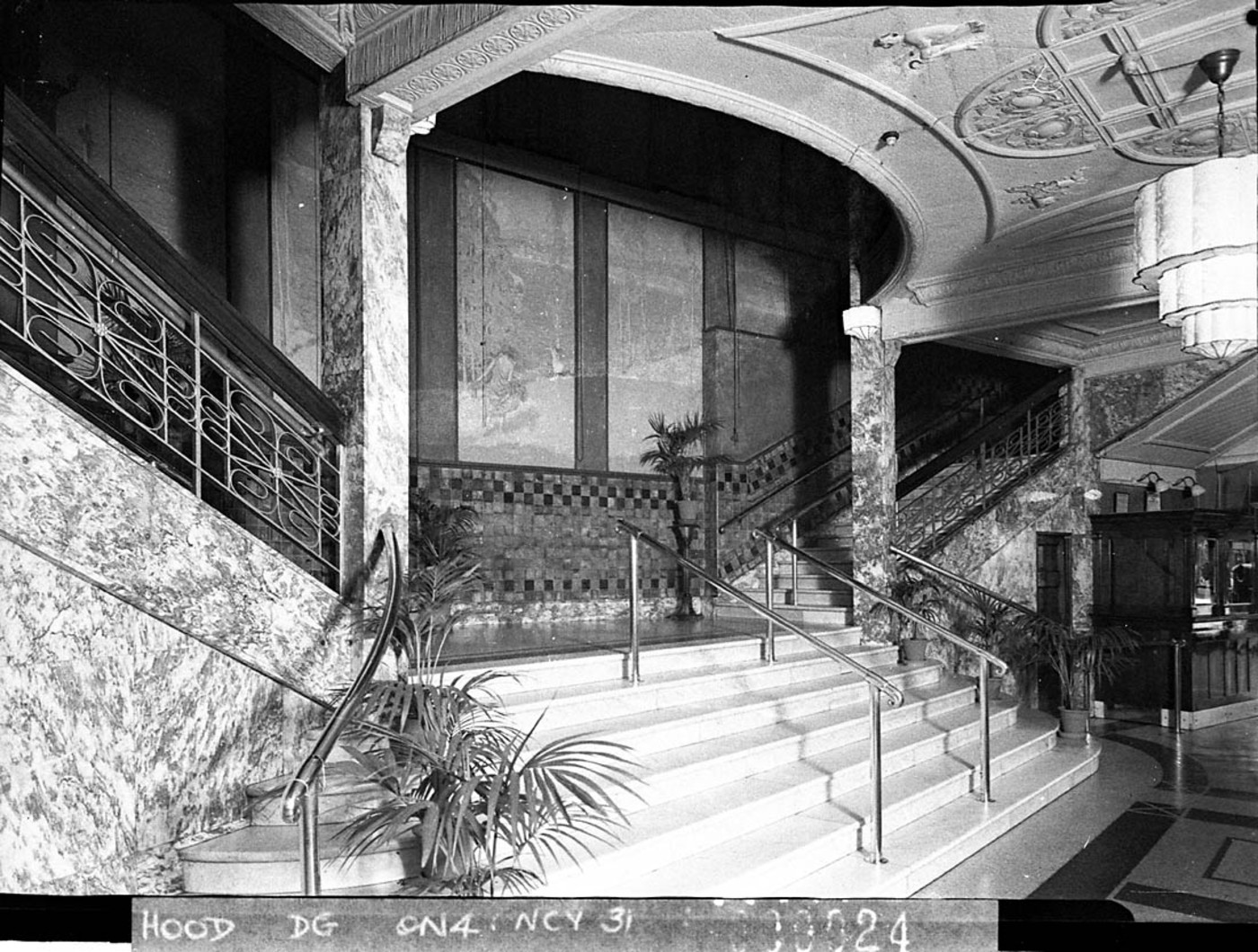
Entrance foyer and stairs Kings Cross Theatre, Sydney, July 1940
