= On the Twentieth Century =

Musical

- Original poster artwork
- Music: Cy Coleman
- Lyrics: Betty Comden; Adolph Green
- Book: Betty Comden; Adolph Green
- Basis: Unpub. Play: Charles Bruce Millholland; 1932 Play: Ben Hecht, Charles MacArthur; 1934 Film: Twentieth Century
- Productions: 1978 Broadway; 1980 West End; 2010 London Off West End; 2015 Broadway revival
- Awards: Tony Award for Best Book; Tony Award for Best Original Score

On the Twentieth Century is a musical with book and lyrics by Betty Comden and Adolph Green and music by Cy Coleman. Based partly on the 1932 play Twentieth Century and its 1934 film adaptation, the musical is part operetta, part farce and part screwball comedy. The story involves the behind-the-scenes relationship between Lily, a temperamental actress and Oscar, a bankrupt theatre producer. On a luxury train traveling from Chicago to New York in the early 1930s, Oscar tries to cajole the glamorous Hollywood star into playing the lead in his new, but not-yet-written drama, and perhaps to rekindle their romance.

The musical ran on Broadway in 1978–1979, running for 449 performances and winning five Tony Awards. It showcased Madeline Kahn in the role of Lily Garland, and when Kahn left the show, the role launched the career of Judy Kaye. Several revivals followed in London and elsewhere, and a 2015 Broadway revival featured Kristin Chenoweth and Peter Gallagher.

== Background ==
Comden and Green based the musical on three works: the 1934 Howard Hawks film Twentieth Century; the original 1932 play of the same name by Ben Hecht and Charles MacArthur; and Hecht's and MacArthur's inspiration, Charles Bruce Millholland's unproduced play about his experiences working for theater producer David Belasco, Napoleon of Broadway.

Cy Coleman, when asked to compose the score, initially refused. "I didn't want to do twenties pastiche – there was too much of that around," he recalled. "But when I realized the main characters had these larger-than-life personalities, I thought – ah, comic opera! Even the tikka-tikka-tikka patter of a locomotive train has the rhythm of comic opera." Coleman agreed to write the music for the show and produced an operetta-style score reminiscent of the works of Sigmund Romberg and Rudolf Friml.

== Plot summary ==
=== Act I ===
In the early 1930s, egomaniacal impresario Oscar Jaffee is on the skids after four flops in a row. His latest show has abruptly closed in Chicago, leaving his angry cast and crew (to whom he owes back salary) "Stranded Again". On the lam, Oscar secretly sends orders to Owen O'Malley and Oliver Webb, his press agent and business manager, to meet him on the Twentieth Century Limited to New York and to get tickets for Drawing Room "A".

On the La Salle Station platform, the passengers praise the wonders of a journey "On the Twentieth Century". Owen and Oliver, bursting into Drawing Room "A", discover Congressman Grover Lockwood in a compromising position with his secretary Anita. Oliver easily persuades them to abandon Drawing Room "A". After making it on the departing train by climbing through a window, Oscar tells Owen and Oliver that he will soon regain his riches and success ("I Rise Again"). He reveals the reason they had to get Drawing Room "A": at the next stop, his former lover and protegee, Lily Garland (née Mildred Plotka), now a temperamental film star, will board the train and will be staying next door in Drawing Room 'B'. Oliver and Owen doubt that she will agree to be in Oscar's new play now that she's a movie star; Oscar insists that she will.

In a flashback, Oscar remembers the time he auditioned spoiled actress Imelda Thornton for the leading role in a play. Oscar discovered that the gawky young accompanist, Mildred Plotka, could sing "The Indian Maiden's Lament" much better than Imelda, even finishing with an operatic cadenza. Oscar immediately decided to cast Mildred in the leading role as "Veronique", a French street singer who wouldn't sleep with Otto von Bismarck and thus instigated the Franco-Prussian War. Mildred insisted that she did not want to be an actress, but Oscar convinced her to take the part, renaming her Lily Garland.

The conductor warns the passengers in Drawing Room "A" that a lunatic is on board the train. He then announces, "I Have Written a Play", titled Life on a Train. Oscar sends the conductor away. At Englewood, Illinois, all the passengers, especially Oscar, are thrilled that they and Lily Garland will be on the train "Together". Lily's costar and lover, Bruce Granit, fails to get off the train before it departs, and must come along for the ride. Owen and Oliver stop by Drawing Room "B" and beg Lily to return, revealing that Oscar is so poor, his theatre will be repossessed the next day. She replies, "Never". Bruce, suspicions aroused by Lily's passionate tirade, asks if she ever had a relationship with Oscar. She recites a long list of former lovers and insists that Oscar was never one of them. Still, in their separate drawing rooms, Oscar and Lily recall the relationship they once had ("Our Private World").

In the observation car, passengers complain that the religious lunatic has stuck "Repent for the time is at hand" stickers everywhere. The conductor assures them that they will catch the lunatic soon. This turns out to be Mrs. Letitia Primrose, who says it is her mission to warn sinners to "Repent". These stickers inspire Oscar with an idea for his new play: he will direct The Passion of Mary Magdalene, a role so good that Lily could not possibly refuse it. Bruce is equally confident that Lily will continue to act opposite him in Hollywood. In their respective drawing rooms, each prepares to meet with Lily again and vows that she will be his ("Mine"). As Oliver and Owen prepare a press release for the new play, Letitia remarks that she sponsors creative endeavors. She declares that she is the founder and president of Primrose Restoria Pills, and she does good works with her extra capital.

Lily enters Drawing Room "B" in a sexy negligee, and as Bruce and she begin playing, Oscar walks in. Oscar reveals his former relationship with Lily, and Bruce, outraged, walks out. Lily angrily recalls Oscar's jealousy and possessiveness in their former Svengali-like relationship. She is rich and successful without him; but Oscar retorts that she has lost her art by selling out to Hollywood ("I've Got it All"). Lily tells Oscar she plans to sign with successful producer Max Jacobs, Oscar's former assistant stage manager. Oscar furiously returns to Drawing Room "A", but he is mollified when Oliver and Owen introduce him to rich and religious Mrs. Primrose. Congressman Lockwood enters and announces, "I Have Written a Play", titled Life on the Hog Market Committee. They send him out and Oscar and Mrs. Primrose shake hands as Bruce and Lily sit down to dinner in the next car ("On The Twentieth Century" (reprise)).

=== Act II ===
In an entr'acte, four porters philosophically declare that "Life Is Like a Train".

Owen, Oliver and Oscar congratulate themselves on obtaining Mrs. Primrose's check for $200,000 ("Five Zeros"). Lily's maid, Agnes, brings Oscar a message: Lily wants to see him immediately. Dr. Johnson detains him, however, declaring, "I Have Written a Play", titled Life in a Metropolitan Hospital. Oscar ignores Dr. Johnson and enters Drawing Room "B". Lily tells Oscar that she has decided to give him money to help him with his financial situation. Oscar proudly reveals Mrs. Primrose's check and describes the Mary Magdalene play to Lily. Lily is transfixed and begins acting the part, ending with Oscar's arms around her waist. She jolts back to reality and insists on meeting Mrs. Primrose. Owen and Oliver escort Lily to Drawing Room "A", where they, Mrs. Primrose, and Oscar all attempt to persuade Lily to sign the contract. Bruce enters and tries to convince her not to sign it ("Sextet"). Lily resolves not to live in the past and refuses to sign, deciding to continue in movies with Bruce. Oscar suggests a compromise; if Lily does the play, Mrs. Primrose can pay for the movie too. Lily finds this very exciting and informally agrees. She insists on a few minutes alone before signing the contract.

In Cleveland, Ohio, some officers have boarded the train. They are looking for Mrs. Primrose, who escaped from the Benzinger Clinic mental institution that morning, and they have come to take her back. The news soon spreads throughout the train: "She's a Nut!" Oscar suddenly has no money again, and Lily, who has not yet signed the contract, angrily confronts him. Max Jacobs arrives with a new play, and Lily joyously greets him. She reads over the play, trying to envision herself as the decadent, glamorous title character, "Babette", but her thoughts keep straying to Mary Magdalene. Nevertheless, she finally decides that she will do Max's play.

Oscar meets Oliver and Owen in the observation car. He is carrying a gun and insists that he is going to end it all. He details "The Legacy" he is leaving them and returns to Drawing Room "A". Oliver and Owen are convinced he's just being dramatic, but then they hear gunshots. They find Mrs. Primrose holding the gun and Oscar mournfully staggering. She tried to take the gun away from him and it went off. Dr. Johnson examines Oscar and finds nothing wrong with him. Oscar says he will read Dr. Johnson's play if she pretends he really is wounded. Dr. Johnson agrees, and Owen tells Lily that Oscar is dying. Oscar begs her to sign the contract before he dies. She signs it, and they passionately sing to each other ("Lily, Oscar"). Max Jacobs rushes in, and Oscar, very much alive, gleefully shows him the contract. Lily tells him to check the signature. She has signed "Peter Rabbit"! She and Oscar scream ridiculous insults at each other until they start laughing and fall into each other's arms. They reconcile, kissing passionately, resulting in an outraged Max leaving the room. The ensemble comes out, dressed in white, as Owen and Oliver throw petals, followed by Lily in a wedding dress and Oscar in a white tuxedo. The newlyweds embrace and join the company in one final proclamation that "Life is like a train!" ("Finale").

== Productions ==
Following a tryout at the Colonial Theatre in Boston, the Broadway production opened on February 19, 1978 at the St. James Theatre to mixed reviews. It ran for 11 previews and 449 performances. Directed by Hal Prince and choreographed by Larry Fuller, the cast starred John Cullum and Madeline Kahn, and featured Imogene Coca and Kevin Kline. The show won Tony Awards for best score and best book, among others. After only nine weeks, Kahn departed the show. The New York Times reported that "she said she was withdrawing because of damage to her vocal cords." She was replaced by understudy Judy Kaye, who had been playing a small role, and the critics were invited to return. According to The New York Times, "bang, boom, overnight [Kaye] is a star." They praised her performance, Kaye won a Theatre World Award, and her theatrical career took off. She later starred in the US tour opposite Rock Hudson.

A London staging, produced by Harold Fielding, and starring Keith Michell as Oscar, Julia McKenzie as Lily, Mark Wynter as Bruce and Ann Beach as Mrs. Primrose, opened on March 19, 1980, at Her Majesty's Theatre, and ran for 165 performances. The musical was nominated for the Olivier Award, "Musical of the Year", and McKenzie was nominated for Actress of the Year in a Musical. As part of an Actors Fund benefit, a one night staged concert was held on September 26, 2005 at the New Amsterdam Theatre in New York, starring Marin Mazzie as Lily, Douglas Sills as Oscar, Joanne Worley as Letitia and Christopher Sieber as Bruce. The first London revival was staged at the Union Theatre, Southwark in December 2010 and January 2011. Howard Samuels played Oscar and Rebecca Vere was Lily. The show was directed by Ryan McBryde.

In 2011, Roundabout Theatre Company had a reading with Hugh Jackman, Kristin Chenoweth and Andrea Martin participating. Roundabout revived the musical on Broadway, at the American Airlines Theatre, beginning previews on February 12, 2015, and officially opening on March 15, 2015 for a limited run through July 19, 2015 (extended from the original closing date of July 5). Scott Ellis directed, and choreography was by Warren Carlyle. The cast starred Chenoweth as Lily and Peter Gallagher as Oscar, and featured Andy Karl as Bruce, Mark Linn-Baker as Oliver, Michael McGrath as Owen and Mary Louise Wilson as Letitia. Designers included David Rockwell (set), William Ivey Long (costumes) and Donald Holder (lighting). The production was nominated for five Tony Awards, including best revival, but did not win any. The song "The Legacy" from the original score was rewritten as "Because of Her", using Coleman's original music but new lyrics by Amanda Green about Oscar's acknowledgement of Lily's importance in his life.

A Japanese production starring Takahisa Masuda played from March 12 to 31, 2024, at the Tokyu Theatre Orb before moving to Osaka April 5 to 10 at the Orix Theater.

== Songs ==
Act I

- Stranded Again – Bishop, Actors, Singers
- Saddle Up the Horse – Owen O'Malley & Oliver Webb
- On the Twentieth Century – Porters, Letitia, Conductor, Flanagan, Rogers, Passengers
- I Rise Again – Oscar Jaffe, Owen & Oliver
- Indian Maiden's Lament – Imelda & Mildred Plotka
- Veronique – Lily Garland & Male Singers
- I Have Written a Play – Conductor Flanagan
- Together – Porters & Passengers, Oliver
- Never – Lily, Owen, & Oliver
- This Is the Day – Lily & Agnes (performed in Boston, cut prior to Broadway opening)
- Our Private World – Lily & Oscar
- Repent – Letitia
- Mine – Oscar & Bruce Granit
- I've Got it All – Lily & Oscar
- On the Twentieth Century (reprise) – Company

Act II

- Entr'acte: Life is Like a Train – Porters
- I Have Written a Play (Reprise 1) - Congressman Lockwood
- Five Zeros – Owen, Oliver, Letitia, & Oscar
- I Have Written a Play (Reprise 2) - Dr. Johnson
- Sextet/Sign Lily Sign – Owen, Oliver, Oscar, Letitia, Lily, Bruce
- She's a Nut – Company
- Max Jacobs – Max
- Babbette – Lily
- The Legacy ("Because of Her" for 2015 revival) – Oscar
- Lily, Oscar – Lily & Oscar
- Finale - Company

== Casts ==
	Original Broadway (1978)	Broadway Revival (2015)
Lily Garland (Mildred Plotka)	Madeline Kahn	Kristin Chenoweth
Oscar Jaffee	John Cullum	Peter Gallagher
Letitia Primrose	Imogene Coca	Mary Louise Wilson
Owen O'Malley	George Coe	Mark Linn-Baker
Oliver Webb	Dean Dittman	Michael McGrath
Bruce Granit	Kevin Kline	Andy Karl
Congressman Lockwood	Rufus Smith	Andy Taylor
Max Jacobs	George Lee Andrews	James Moye
Conductor Flanagan	Tom Batten	Jim Walton
Agnes	Judy Kaye	Mamie Parris
Imelda Thornton	Willi Burke	Paula Leggett Chase
Dr. Johnson	Willi Burke	Linda Mugleston

== Awards and nominations ==
=== Original Broadway production ===
Year	Award	Category	Nominee	Result
1978	Tony Award	Best Musical		Nominated
1978	Tony Award	Best Book of a Musical	Betty Comden and Adolph Green	Won
1978	Tony Award	Best Original Score	Cy Coleman, Betty Comden and Adolph Green	Won
1978	Tony Award	Best Performance by a Leading Actor in a Musical	John Cullum	Won
1978	Tony Award	Best Performance by a Leading Actress in a Musical	Madeline Kahn	Nominated
1978	Tony Award	Best Performance by a Featured Actor in a Musical	Kevin Kline	Won
1978	Tony Award	Best Performance by a Featured Actress in a Musical	Imogene Coca	Nominated
1978	Tony Award	Best Direction of a Musical	Hal Prince	Nominated
1978	Tony Award	Best Scenic Design	Robin Wagner	Won
1978	Drama Desk Award	Outstanding Actress in a Musical	Judy Kaye	Nominated
1978	Drama Desk Award	Outstanding Featured Actor in a Musical	Kevin Kline	Won
1978	Drama Desk Award	Outstanding Music	Cy Coleman	Won
1978	Drama Desk Award	Outstanding Set Design	Robin Wagner	Won
1978	Drama Desk Award	Outstanding Costume Design	Florence Klotz	Won
1978	Theatre World Award		Judy Kaye	Won

=== Original London production ===
Year	Award	Category	Nominee	Result
1980	Laurence Olivier Award	Best New Musical		Nominated
1980	Laurence Olivier Award	Best Actress in a Musical	Julia McKenzie	Nominated

=== 2015 Broadway revival ===
Year	Award	Category	Nominee	Result
2015	Tony Award	Best Revival of a Musical		Nominated
2015	Tony Award	Best Actress in a Musical	Kristin Chenoweth	Nominated
2015	Tony Award	Best Featured Actor in a Musical	Andy Karl	Nominated
2015	Tony Award	Best Scenic Design of a Musical	David Rockwell	Nominated
2015	Tony Award	Best Costume Design of a Musical	William Ivey Long	Nominated
2015	Drama Desk Award	Outstanding Revival of a Musical		Nominated
2015	Drama Desk Award	Outstanding Actress in a Musical	Kristin Chenoweth	Won
2015	Drama Desk Award	Outstanding Featured Actor in a Musical	Andy Karl	Nominated
2015	Drama Desk Award	Outstanding Choreography	Warren Carlyle	Nominated
2015	Drama League Award	Outstanding Revival of a Broadway or Off-Broadway Musical		Nominated
2015	Drama League Award	Distinguished Performance	Kristin Chenoweth	Nominated
2015	Drama League Award	Distinguished Performance	Andy Karl	Nominated
2015	Outer Critics Circle Award	Outstanding Revival of a Musical		Nominated
2015	Outer Critics Circle Award	Outstanding Director of a Musical	Scott Ellis	Nominated
2015	Outer Critics Circle Award	Outstanding Choreographer	Warren Carlyle	Nominated
2015	Outer Critics Circle Award	Outstanding Set Design	David Rockwell	Nominated
2015	Outer Critics Circle Award	Outstanding Costume Design	William Ivey Long	Nominated
2015	Outer Critics Circle Award	Outstanding Actor in a Musical	Peter Gallagher	Nominated
2015	Outer Critics Circle Award	Outstanding Actress in a Musical	Kristin Chenoweth	Won
2015	Outer Critics Circle Award	Outstanding Featured Actor in a Musical	Andy Karl	Won
2015	Outer Critics Circle Award	Outstanding Featured Actress in a Musical	Mary Louise Wilson	Nominated

== Bibliography ==
- Kantor, Michael and Maslon, Laurence. Broadway: The American Musical. New York:Bullfinch Press, 2004. ISBN 0-8212-2905-2
