= Alexia Khadime =

British actress and singer

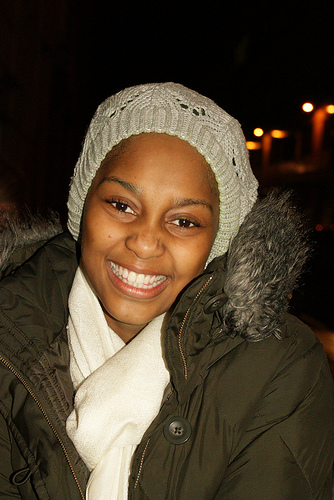
- Khadime in 2009
- Born: 9 June 1983 (age 43); London, England
- Occupations: Actress, singer
- Years active: 1996–present
- Website: alexiakhadime.com

Alexia Khadime (born 9 June 1983) is a British actress and mezzo-soprano, known for her roles in musical theatre and television.

== Career ==
=== Theatre ===
Khadime made her first appearance on the stage in 1999, when she appeared in "Cinderella" at the Hackney Empire, and the following year, she took part in the UK Tour Leader of the Pack.

She made her West End debut aged 17, appearing as part of the ensemble in The Lion King in 2001, additionally providing cover for the role of "Nala". In 2003, she appeared in the UK Tour of Whistle Down the Wind, playing the role of "Candy". In 2004, she returned to The Lion King – this time playing "Nala" as the lead, and she remained in the role until 2008.

In early 2008, she successfully auditioned for the lead role of "Elphaba" in the musical Wicked. She began performances on her 25th birthday, and played the role for six months (temporarily replacing Kerry Ellis who was playing a limited engagement with the Broadway Company). Khadime left Wicked in November 2008, but returned in May 2009 when Ellis left the company. Throughout both of her spells in Wicked, Khadime played alongside Dianne Pilkington as "Glinda". In 2009, the pair were honoured at the "Woman of the Future Awards" in the Arts & Culture category. Khadime's run in Wicked came to an end in March 2010 when she was succeeded by Rachel Tucker. On Tuesday March 4, 2025, Lencia Kebede joined Khadime as one of the only black woman to be a principal Elphaba, and was the first black woman to play the role on Broadway.

After concluding her time in Wicked, she next appeared in the straight play Welcome to Thebes at the Royal National Theatre through the Summer of 2010, before returning to musical theatre, playing "Deb" in Ordinary Days at London's Trafalgar Studios in February and March 2011.

In June 2011, she took over from Samantha Barks in the iconic role of "Éponine" in the London production of Les Misérables. She played the role for just short of a year, before being passed over to Danielle Hope.

In late 2012, Khadime joined the original West End company of The Book of Mormon, playing the role of "Nabulungi", with performances starting in February 2013. She won the fan voted 2014 WhatsOnStage.com Award for "Best Supporting Actress in a Musical" for her portrayal of Nabulungi, as well as the West End Wilma award for "Best Supporting Cast Member". Her last performance in The Book of Mormon was on 30 January 2016.

Khadime played the role of Miriam in The Prince of Egypt on the stage of the Dominion Theatre, London's West End.

On 7 March 2023, Khadime returned to Wicked opposite Lucy St. Louis as Glinda, marking the first time in history that both roles are being played by black actresses simultaneously.

Title	Year(s)	Role(s)	Venue(s)
Cinderella	1999 – 2000	Ensemble	Hackney Empire
Leader of the Pack	2000 – 2001	Ronnie Sepctor	UK National Tour
The Lion King	2001	Ensemble/Understudy for Nala	Lyceum Theatre
Whistle Down the Wind	2003	Candy	UK National Tour
The Lion King	2004 – 2008	Nala	Lyceum Theatre
Wicked	June – November 2008; May 2009 – March 2010	Elphaba	Apollo Victoria Theatre
Welcome to Thebes	June – September 2010	Harmonia	Royal National Theatre
Ordinary Days	February – March 2011	Deb	Trafalgar Studios
Les Misérables	June 2011 – June 2012	Éponine	Sondheim Theatre
The Book of Mormon	February 2013 – January 2016	Nabulungi	Prince of Wales Theatre
One Love: The Bob Marley Musical	March – April 2017	Rita Marley	Birmingham Repertory Theatre
The Prince of Egypt	February 2020 – 2022	Miriam	Dominion Theatre
Wicked	March 2023 – March 2025	Elphaba	Apollo Victoria Theatre

=== Television ===
As a young actress, Khadime made her first television appearance in 1996, appearing in an episode of the BBC's The Sculptress. She appeared in Grange Hill for two years, and in 1998, had a regular role as "Tanisha" in children's ITV series Comin' Atcha! In 1999, she appeared as "Ellie Burns" in the BBC's The Queen's Nose, and has additional credits in The Bill, Class Action, and Sky One's Dream Team.

While appearing in Les Misérables in 2012, Khadime made a special guest appearance on RTÉ's OMG! Jedward's Dream Factory, when 11-year-old Aoife Dardis received her wish to see Les Misérables in London, and to meet Khadime, her favourite actress. Khadime also had a regular role in the children's gameshow Splatalot!, playing "Madeva", a defender. She also voices Sardonyx in the Cartoon Network series Steven Universe.

=== Film ===
Along with fellow Wicked alumni Kerry Ellis and Dianne Pilkington, Khadime appeared as a wench in the 2012 movie edition of Les Misérables. On 9 June, Khadime's birthday, The film adaptation of London Road Directed by Rufus Norris was previewed, where she appeared in a cameo role of "Radio Techy."

=== Music ===
In February 2003, credited simply as "Alexia", Khadime released a single entitled "Ring" through Virgin Records. It entered the UK Singles Chart at No. 48. In 2008, she recorded a duet with Ben James-Ellis entitled "Enchanted" for the album Act One – Songs From The Musicals of Alexander S. Bermange. In 2011, along with her Ordinary Days co-star Daniel Boys, Khadime contributed the duet "Looking Back" to Michael Bruce's "Unwritten Songs". Her voice can also be heard on the film soundtracks for Pride and Amazing Grace.
