= Jo (musical) =

Musical by Dan Redfeld, Christina Harding and John Gabriel Koladziej

Jo – the Little Women Musical is a musical with music by Dan Redfeld and book and lyrics by Christina Harding and John Gabriel Koladziej. The show focuses on Jo March, a central character from Louisa May Alcott's novel Little Women, and her hope to be a voice of her generation, after the passing of her sister Beth.

== Productions ==
In August 2021 a first reading of the show starred Jenna Lea Rosen as Jo March. Following more work, a first video of the song "Fly Away" was released in 2022, featuring Rosen.

A selection of songs from the show, then titled Little Women, a New Musical, was presented in 2023 in a series of concerts across the US, from Los Angeles to New York. The presentation at 54 Below in New York on 24 April 2023 starred Rosen as Jo, Julia Murney as Marmee and Ann Harada. In 2025 the musical was recorded as a concept album at Abbey Road Studios in London. Christine Allado starred as Jo March, Rob Houchen played Laurie Laurence, Laura Benanti was Marmee March and Julian Ovenden was Father.

A one-night-only staged concert of the musical was presented at the Theatre Royal, Drury Lane in London on January 25, 2026, with Christine Allado playing Jo, Kerry Ellis as Marmee and Tracie Bennett as Aunt March.

== Musical numbers ==
=== 54 Below concert (April 2023) ===
- Prelude – Jo March
- The Pickwick Portfolio – Jo, Amy, Beth and Meg March
- Journey – Jo
- The Simple Truth – Meg March
- (A World of) Dreams & Figments – Amy March
- Little Women – Marmee, Meg, Beth and Jo
- An Ode on Aunt March's Urn – Aunt March and Amy
- The Life We'll Know – Laurie and Jo
- Fly Away – Jo
- The Tales That I Tell – Jo
- A Friend Like You – Jo and Professor Bhaer
- Between the Earth and Sky – Marmee
- When Nighttime Falls – Jo and Professor Bhaer
- My Captive Heart – Laurie and Amy
- Moments – Beth
- In the Darkest Midnight – Professor Bhaer
- This Is Our Story – Jo

== Cast and characters ==
Character	54 Below (2023)
Jo March	Jenna Lea Rosen
Marmee March	Julia Murney
Father	–
Laurie Laurence	Bradley Gibson
Meg March	Amanda Drewes; Sara Jean Ford
Beth March	Miyuki Miyagi
Amy March	Sophie Pollono
Professor Bhaer	Chris Mann
John Brooke	–
Aunt March	Barbara Carlton Heart
Sallie Gardiner	–
Fred Vaughn	–
Grandfather	–
