= Kurt Egyiawan =

British theatre and television actor

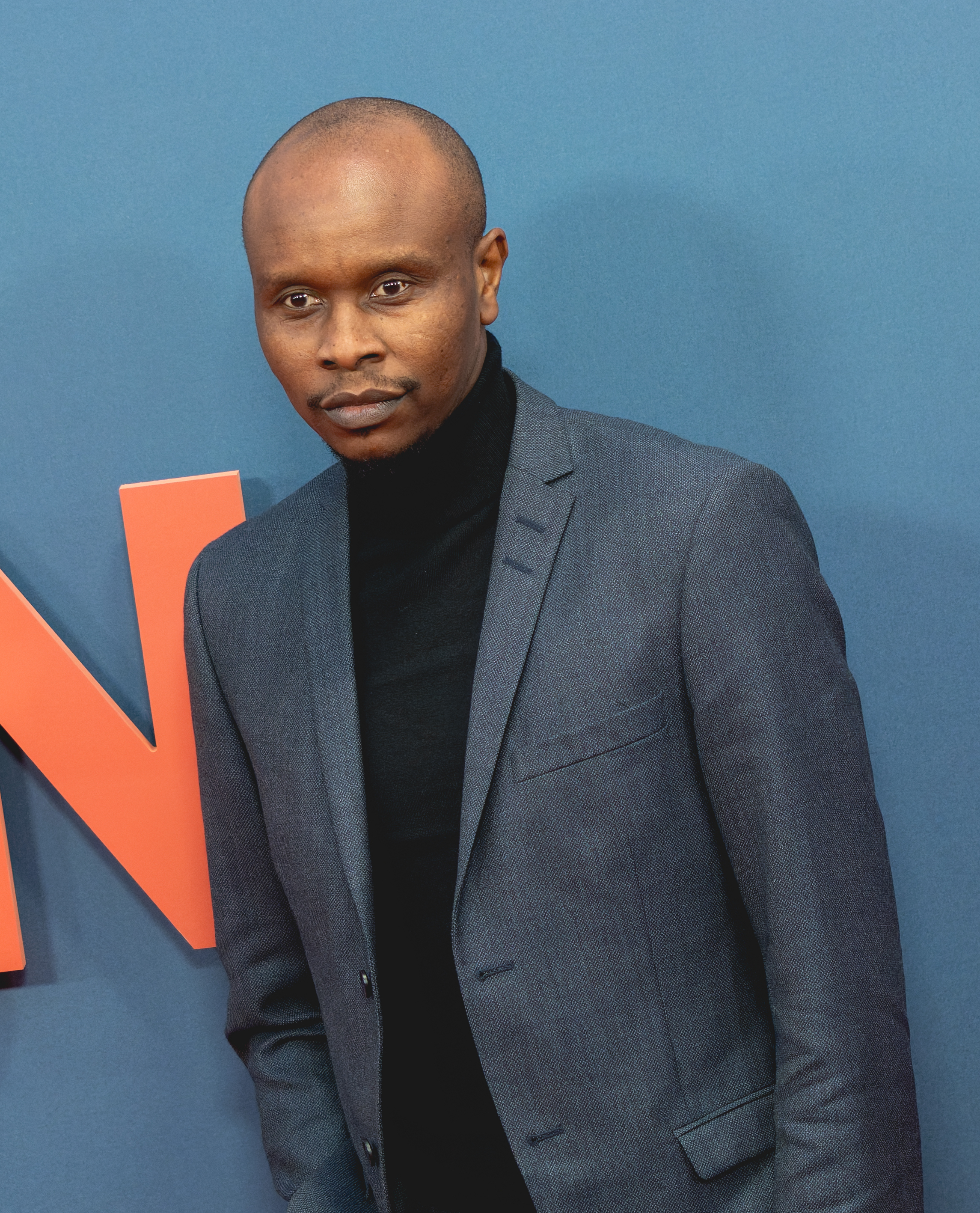
- Born: Kurt Egyiawan; 1983 or 1984 (age 42–43); Cameroon
- Education: Guildhall School of Music and Drama
- Occupation: Actor
- Years active: 2008–present

Kurt Egyiawan is an English theatre and television actor. He is most known for playing various roles in Shakespearean plays at the Globe, including the role of Othello. He is also known for his various television roles, most notably the role of Grand Maester Orwyle in HBO's House of the Dragon.

== Early life and education ==
Egyiawan was born in Cameroon, and moved to the United Kingdom early in his childhood. As a child, Egyiawan participated in the National Youth Music Theatre. Egyiawan then trained at the Guildhall School of Music and Drama. In 2011, he won the Spotlight Prize with a performance of the Best Man Speech by Ben Lloyd-Hughes. He was also nominated for the Ian Charleson Award for his role of Arsace in Bérénice. Egyiawan has returned to the Guildhall as a visiting tutor in the school's acting program, where he teaches screen acting.

== Career ==
Egyiawan's first professional roles were in 2008, where he performed in a production of King Lear, where he played various supporting roles, as well as in a production of The Frontline by Ché Walker. Both plays were performed at the Shakespeare's Globe Theatre.

In 2011, Egyiawan performed in the ensemble of the UK touring production of Earthquakes in London. The next year, he appeared in his first cinema role, where he played Q's assistant in Skyfall. He then took on the roles of the Dauphin and of Lord Scroop in a Shakespeare's Globe production of Henry V, where his performances received praise. He also performed in the televised version of the play.

In late 2012 until 2013, Egyiawan performed in an all-male double feature at Shakespeare's Globe, where he was cast as Richmond and the Duchess of York in Richard III, as well as in the roles of Valentine and an officer in Twelfth Night. He performed alongside Stephen Fry and Mark Rylance. Egyiawan then took on various supporting roles in an English production of Aimé Césaire's political play A Season In the Congo. From November 2013 to February 2014, the double feature of Richard III and Twelfth Night moved to the Belasco Theatre on Broadway, where Egyiawan received praise from American reviewers and press for his performances.

In 2015, was cast in the role of Chidhina in The Rise and Shine of Comrade Fiasco, a play about post-colonial Zimbabwe. The play was produced in collaboration with the Gate Theatre for their "Freedom Burning" season, which sought to highlight plays about the quest for liberation. Egyiawan's performance received praise. In the same year, Egyiawan performed in the role of Angelo in the Shakespeare's Globe production of Measure for Measure, as well as in the televised version of the play.

Also in 2015, Egyiawan acted in various film roles, such as the role of Murray in Pan, the role of Tim in Kill Your Friends, and the role of 2nd I-C in Beasts of No Nation. For the latter, he was nominated for the Screen Actors Guild Awards in the 'Outstanding Performance by a Cast in Motion Picture' category alongside the cast of the film.

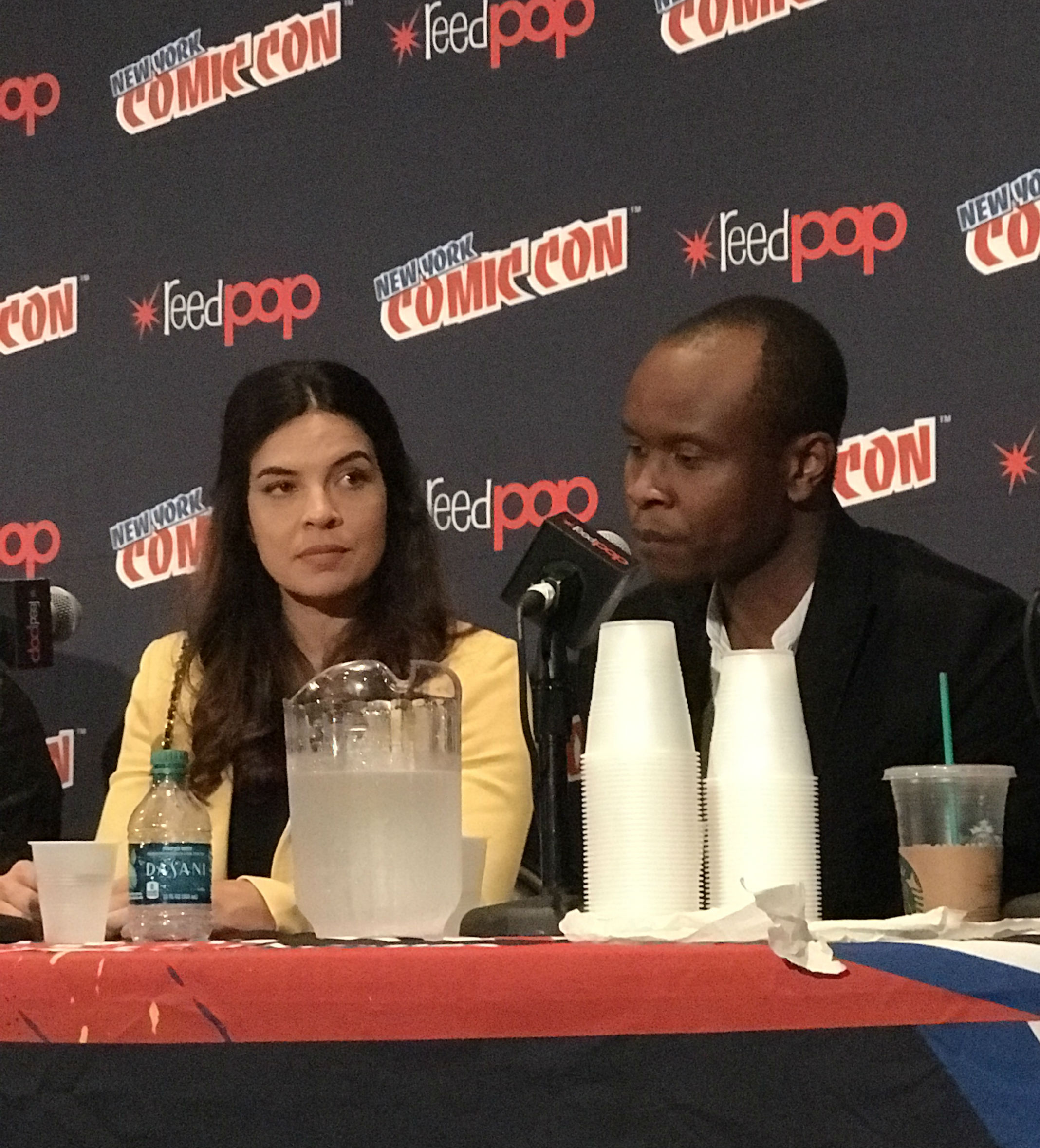
Egyiawan (right) at the New York Comic Con panel for The Exorcist in 2017 © Luigi Novi / Wikimedia Commons.

From 2016 to 2017, Egyiawan was part of the main cast of the Fox network's American supernatural horror series The Exorcist, playing Father Devon Bennet. This was Egyiawan's first television role.

In 2017, Egyiawan played the eponymous role in Shakespeare's tragedy Othello at Shakespeare's Globe Theatre. His performance received praise, including from the Evening Standard.

In 2018, Egyiawan joined the cast of Mood Music at the Old Vic Theatre, playing the role of Miles. The following year, Egyiawan took on a supporting role of Lundi in a Manchester International Festival production of Tree. The play then opened at the Young Vic.

In 2022, Egyiawan performed the role of Moses in the short film Lions, which won the Unifrance short film award. He also took on the role of Dia in the film I Used to Be Famous. The same year, Egyiawan was cast in the guest role of Roger Barrowby in the British spy thriller Slow Horses. Egyiawan was also a recurring cast member in season 1 of HBO's House of the Dragon, playing Grand Maester Orwyle. He was promoted to the main cast in the second season of the show in 2024, and his performance has been praised.

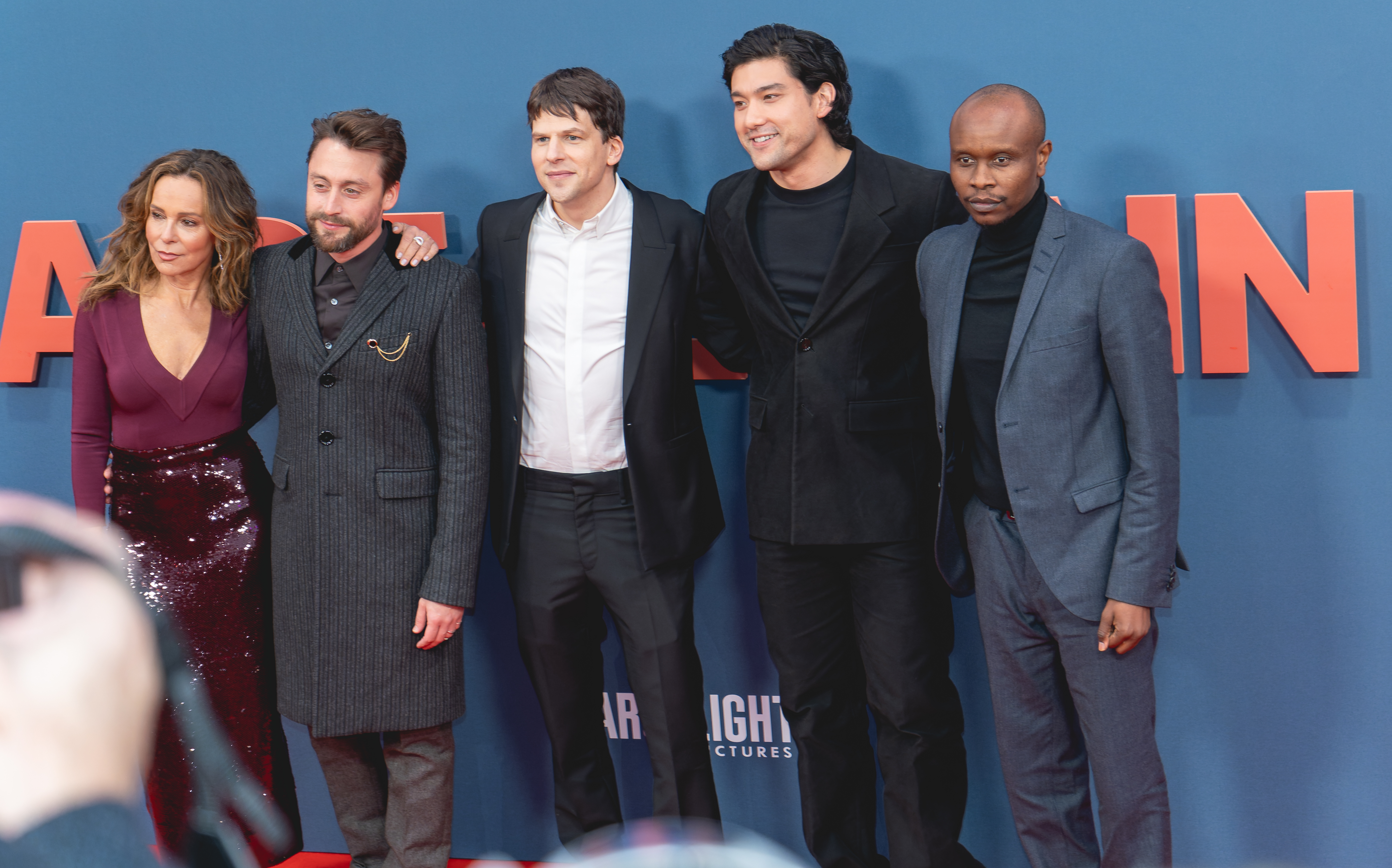
Egyiawan (right) at the Premiere of A Real Pain in 2024.

Egyiawan was cast as Philip Dust in the 2023 mini-series Bodies.

In 2024, he played the recurring role of Adrian in the British mythological dark comedy Kaos, before it was cancelled after one season. He has received praise for his role. Egyiawan was also cast in the widely acclaimed film A Real Pain as Eloge. His performance received recognition from The Hollywood Reporter.

Egyiawan was then cast in the American thriller The Agency as Osman. The series premiered on 29 November 2024.

In 2025, Egyiawan joined the cast of season 2 of Andor, a Star Wars spin-off series.

== Filmography ==
†	Denotes works that have not yet been released

=== Film ===
Year	Title	Role	Notes
2012	Skyfall	Q's Assistant	
2015	Pan	Murray	
2015	Beasts of No Nation	2nd I-C	
2015	Kill Your Friends	Tim	
2022	I Used to Be Famous	Dia	
2022	Lions	Moses	Short film
2024	A Real Pain	Eloge	

=== Television ===
Year	Title	Role	Notes
2013	Shakespeare's Globe Theatre: Henry V	Louis the Dauphin	Televised production of the play at the Globe
2015	Measure for Measure from Shakespeare's Globe	Angelo	Televised production of the play at the Globe
2016–2017	The Exorcist	Father Bennett	Main role
2022	Slow Horses	Roger Barrowby	Episode: "Work Drinks"
2022–present	House of the Dragon	Grand Maester Orwyle	Recurring role (season 1); Main role (season 2–present); 21 episodes
2023	Bodies	Philip Dust	Episode: "All In Good Time"
2024	Kaos	Adrian	4 episodes
2024–present	The Agency	Osman Abdel-Aziz	Recurring role
2025	Andor	Grymish	3 episodes
2025	Silent Witness †	Oliver Brown	Series 28

=== Voice roles ===
Year	Title	Role	Notes
2013	The Water-Babies	Grimes	BBC 4 Radio play
2016	Tom Clancy's The Division		Video game produced by Massive Entertainment

== Theatre ==
Stage roles
Year	Title	Role(s)	Notes
2008	The Frontline	Salim	Shakespeare's Globe Theatre
2011	Earthquakes in London	Ensemble	UK Touring production
2012	Henry V	Dauphin	Shakespeare's Globe Theatre
2012	A Season in the Congo	Maurice Mpolo / UN Secretary Dag Hammarskjold / Kantangan loyalist	Young Vic
2012	Richard III	Richmond / Duchess of York	Shakespeare's Globe Theatre
2013	Twelfth Night	Valentine	Shakespeare's Globe Theatre
2013–2014	Twelfth Night	Valentine / Officer	Belasco Theatre, New York
2013–2014	Richard III	Richmond / Duchess of York	Belasco Theatre, New York
2015	Measure for Measure	Angelo	Shakespeare's Globe Theatre
2015	The Rise and Shine of Comrade Fiasco	Chidhina	London Gate Theatre
2017	Othello	Othello	Shakespeare's Globe Theatre
2018	Mood Music	Miles	Old Vic Theatre
2019	Tree	Lundi	Manchester International Festival and the Young Vic
