= Anna Maxwell Martin =

English actress (born 1977)

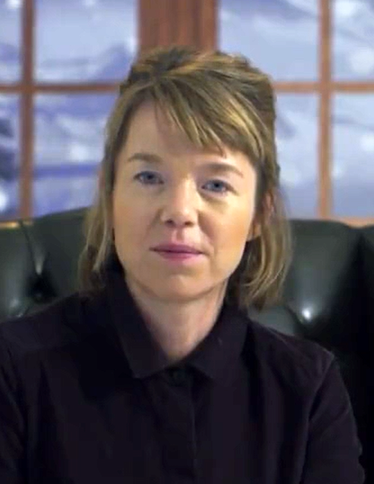
- Martin in 2019
- Born: Anna Charlotte Martin; 10 May 1977 (age 49); Beverley, East Riding of Yorkshire, England
- Education: University of Liverpool; London Academy of Music and Dramatic Art
- Occupation: Actress
- Years active: 2001–present
- Spouse(s): Roger Michell (m. 2010; sep. 2020; died 2021)
- Partner: Richard Cornelius
- Children: 2
- Awards: 2x British Academy Television Award for Best Actress

Anna Charlotte Martin (born 10 May 1977), known professionally as Anna Maxwell Martin, is an English actress. She has won two British Academy Television Awards, for her portrayals of Esther Summerson in the BBC adaptation of Bleak House (2005), and of N in the Channel 4 adaptation of Poppy Shakespeare (2008). She is also known for her roles as DCS Patricia Carmichael in BBC One crime drama Line of Duty (2019–2021) and Kelly Major in Code 404 (2020–2022). From 2016 to 2022, Martin starred in the BBC comedy Motherland, for which she was nominated for the BAFTA for Best Female Comedy Performance. In 2025, she won the International Emmy Award for Best Actress for playing Delia Balmer in ITV's Until I Kill You.

Martin's theatre work includes the role of Lyra Belacqua in the production of His Dark Materials (2003–2004) at the National Theatre.

== Early life and education ==
Anna Charlotte Martin was born in Beverley, East Riding of Yorkshire, England, on 11 May 1977, to Rosalind (née Youngson) and Ivan Martin. Her father was from Maghera, a small town in the south of County Londonderry in Northern Ireland, and he was the managing director of a pharmaceutical company, while her mother, who was from Scotland, was a research scientist. Her mother gave up her job to bring up Anna and her elder brother, Adam.

She attended Beverley High School, where she appeared in school plays. After she left school, Martin studied history at Liverpool University.

After completing her education at Liverpool, Martin enrolled to study acting at London Academy of Music and Dramatic Art (LAMDA) from which she graduated in 2001. She added the name Maxwell (her maternal grandfather's first name) to her name to distinguish her from another member with the same name when she joined Equity.

== Career ==
Martin made her professional stage debut in 2001, in The Little Foxes at the Donmar Theatre, London. She first came to prominence on the London stage playing the leading role of Lyra in the National Theatre's production of Philip Pullman's His Dark Materials. She was then cast in the part of Bessie Higgins in the BBC television adaptation of Elizabeth Gaskell's novel North and South in 2004, and made a guest appearance in the 2005 series of Doctor Who. She played Esther Summerson, the central character in the 2005 BBC adaptation of Charles Dickens's Bleak House, for which she won the Best Actress BAFTA Television Award in 2006.

In January 2006, Martin took part in a reading of The Entertainer at the Royal Court Theatre, and in February and March she appeared in Laura Wade's Other Hands, directed by Bijan Sheibani at the Soho Theatre. She is the narrator of the CD version of The Foreshadowing, a children's book about the First World War by Marcus Sedgwick, which was published in May 2006. In the same year she was one of the five leads in I Really Hate My Job, directed by Oliver Parker and, from October 2006 to April 2007, played Sally Bowles in Bill Kenwright and Rufus Norris's West End production of Cabaret at the Lyric Theatre.

She played Cassandra Austen in Becoming Jane, a 2007 film about the early life of the novelist Jane Austen, starring American actress Anne Hathaway in the title role. At the end of the year she played the gaoler's daughter in Lee Hall's adaptation of The Wind in the Willows, a multimillion-pound production by Box TV for BBC One, and was the joint narrator (with Anton Lesser) of the CD version of Tamar, a children's book about the Second World War by Mal Peet, which was published in December 2007.

In 2008, Martin starred in the BBC Two drama White Girl and with Naomie Harris in Channel 4's adaptation of Poppy Shakespeare, for which she won her second Best Actress BAFTA Television Award in 2009.

From July to October of that year, she appeared with Dame Eileen Atkins in The Female of the Species at the Vaudeville Theatre in London. She also appeared in a BBC Radio 4 adaptation of Agatha Christie's novel Crooked House. In July 2009, she appeared in the BBC Two drama Freefall, and played Neil Armstrong's wife, Janet, in Moonshot: The Flight of Apollo 11, an ITV1 drama documentary to celebrate the 40th anniversary of the Apollo 11 Moon landing.

In February 2010, she played freedom of information campaigner Heather Brooke in On Expenses, a BBC Four satirical drama, and later played Isabella in Shakespeare's Measure For Measure alongside Rory Kinnear at the Almeida Theatre.

In February 2011, she played Sarah Burton in a three-part BBC adaptation of Winifred Holtby's novel South Riding, and received a nomination for BAFTA Best Actress Award for her role.

On 12 July 2011, she played Kay Langrish in a BBC Two dramatisation of The Night Watch. Beginning in September 2012, she starred in the drama mini-series The Bletchley Circle (2012–2014). On 4 September 2012, she appeared in Jimmy McGovern's Accused.

In December 2013, she returned to the world of Jane Austen, starring as Elizabeth Darcy in the BBC Christmas season drama Death Comes to Pemberley, a three-part television adaptation of the P. D. James novel of the same name which continues the events of Austen's Pride and Prejudice six years after Darcy and Elizabeth's marriage, with a murder mystery plot involving the same characters.

In 2015, she played Mary Shelley in ITV drama series The Frankenstein Chronicles. In December that year, she appeared as Ethel Rogers in the BBC three-part serial And Then There Were None, an adaptation of Agatha Christie's novel of the same name.

In 2017, she played Julia in The BBC comedy series Motherland. The show returned for a second series in 2019 and another in May 2021. The second and latest Christmas special, titled "Last Christmas" aired on 23 December 2022, garnering wholly positive reviews from critics.

In 2019, Martin played Beelzebub, leader of the denizens of Hell, in the first series of the Amazon Prime TV serial Good Omens, based on the book by Terry Pratchett and Neil Gaiman. In the same year she joined the cast of Line of Duty during its fifth series, playing DCS Patricia Carmichael, a role she reprised in series six.

In 2021, Martin played the co-lead role in Hollington Drive, an ITV television drama series that began broadcasting on 29 September 2021. Created and written by Sophie Petzal, the series follows two sisters, Theresa (Anna Maxwell Martin) and Helen (Rachael Stirling), and their families as they grapple with the potential crime of their children.

In 2022, she hosted the seventh episode of the sixty-third series of Have I Got News for You alongside guest stars Chris McCausland and Steph McGovern and team captains Paul Merton and Ian Hislop.

In February 2023, it was announced that Martin would portray Delia Balmer in the ITV-commissioned true crime drama series Delia Balmer. The four part miniseries aired in 2024 as Until I Kill You. The series was highly praised by many reviewers, and Martin's performance in particular, with Lucy Mangan of The Guardian giving the series a five-star review. Martin won the Actress award at BAFTA Cymru for her performance in Until I Kill You, which was filmed in Wales.

In summer 2024, Martin played Monica in the world premiere of Joe Penhall's new play The Constituent at The Old Vic, directed by Matthew Warchus and co-starring James Corden. Since 2024, Martin costarred with David Mitchell in Ludwig, a BBC television detective dramedy series. On Christmas Day 2024, she appeared as the celebrant in the final episode of the BBC sitcom Gavin & Stacey.

== Personal life ==
Martin married theatre and film director Roger Michell in 2010 and they had two daughters together. They separated in April 2020, and Michell died of a heart attack in September 2021, aged 65. She is currently in a relationship with camera operator Richard Cornelius, whom she met on the set of the Sky comedy, Code 404, after the Covid-19 pandemic.

In 2022, she was featured on an episode of Who Do You Think You Are?.

In June 2026 Martin was the guest for BBC Radio 4's Desert Island Discs. Her musical choices included "I Love to Boogie" by T. Rex, "Greatest Love of All" by Whitney Houston and "O mio babbino caro" by Giacomo Puccini. Her book was the Jackson Brodie series of books by Kate Atkinson and her luxury was a lucky conker.

== Awards and nominations ==
| Year | Award | Category | Work | Result | Ref. |
|---|---|---|---|---|---|
| 2005 | Laurence Olivier Awards | Best Actress | His Dark Materials | Nominated | |
| 2006 | BBC Drama Poll | Best Actress | Bleak House | Third | |
| 2006 | Broadcasting Press Guild Awards | Best Actress | Bleak House | Nominated | |
| 2006 | British Academy Television Awards | Best Actress | Bleak House | Won | |
| 2006 | Gold Derby Awards | TV movie/Mini Supporting Actress | Bleak House | Nominated | |
| 2009 | Royal Television Society Programme Awards | Best Actor (Female) | Poppy Shakespeare | Nominated | |
| 2009 | British Academy Television Awards | Best Actress | Poppy Shakespeare | Won | |
| 2011 | British Academy Television Awards | Best Actress | South Riding | Nominated | |
| 2011 | Monte-Carlo Television Festival | Best Performance by an Actress – Miniseries | South Riding | Nominated | |
| 2014 | Crime Thriller Awards | Best Leading Actress | Death Comes to Pemberley / The Bletchley Circle | Nominated | |
| 2018 | British Academy Television Awards | Best Female Comedy Performance | Motherland | Nominated | |
| 2023 | Broadcasting Press Guild Awards | Best Actress | Motherland, A Spy Among Friends | Nominated | |
| 2023 | 28th Satellite Awards | Satellite Award for Best Actress – Miniseries or Television Film | A Spy Among Friends | Nominated | |
| 2025 | Broadcasting Press Guild Awards | Best Actress | Until I Kill You, Ludwig, Gavin & Stacey | Nominated | |
| 2025 | British Academy Television Awards | Leading Actress | Until I Kill You | Nominated | |
| 2025 | Royal Television Society Programme Awards | Leading Actor: Female | Until I Kill You | Won | |
| 2025 | BAFTA Cymru | Actress | Until I Kill You | Won | |
| 2025 | International Emmy Awards | Best Performance by an Actress | Until I Kill You | Won | |

== Acting credits ==
=== Film ===
| Year | Film | Role | Notes |
|---|---|---|---|
| 2002 | Eddie Loves Mary | Interviewee | Short film |
| 2004 | Enduring Love | Penny | |
| 2006 | The Other Man | Christine | Short film |
| 2007 | I Really Hate My Job | Madonna | |
| 2007 | Becoming Jane | Cassandra Austen | |
| 2012 | Alan Partridge: Alpha Papa | ACC Janet Whitehead | |
| 2012 | Philomena | Jane | |
| 2014 | National Theatre Live: King Lear | Regan | |
| 2014 | Off the Page: School Girl | Jenny | Short film |
| 2016 | Chubby Funny | Sally | |
| 2018 | The Egg and the Thieving Pie | Shona | Short film |
| 2019 | The Personal History of David Copperfield | Annie Strong | |
| 2020 | The Duke | Mrs. Gowling | |
| 2020 | Say Your Prayers | DCI Brough | |
| 2025 | Fackham Hall | Mrs Edna McAllister | |

=== Television ===
| Year | Film | Role | Notes |
|---|---|---|---|
| 2002 | Midsomer Murders | Arabella Heywood | Series 5; episode 4: "Murder on St. Malley's Day" |
| 2004 | North & South | Bessie Higgins | Miniseries; 3 episodes |
| 2005 | Doctor Who | Suki Macrae Cantrell | Episode: "The Long Game" |
| 2005 | Bleak House | Esther Summerson | Main role. Miniseries; 15 episodes |
| 2006 | The Wind in the Willows | Gaoler's Daughter | Television film |
| 2008 | White Girl | Debbie | Television film |
| 2008 | Poppy Shakespeare | N | Television film |
| 2009 | Free Agents | Sophie | Episodes 3–5 |
| 2009 | Freefall | Mandy Potter | Television film |
| 2009 | Moonshot | Janet Armstrong | Television film |
| 2010 | On Expenses | Heather Brooke | Television film |
| 2011 | South Riding | Sarah Burton | Main role. Miniseries; episodes 1–3 |
| 2011 | CBeebies Bedtime Stories | Herself – Storyteller | 5 episodes |
| 2011 | The Night Watch | Kay Langrish | Television film |
| 2012 | Accused | Tina Dhakin | Series 2; episode 4: "Tina's Story" |
| 2012–2014 | The Bletchley Circle | Susan Gray | Series 1 & 2; 5 episodes |
| 2013 | National Theatre Live: 50 Years on Stage | Horatio / Hannah Jarvis | Television film; Segments: "Hamlet" and "Arcadia" |
| 2013 | Death Comes to Pemberley | Elizabeth Darcy | Miniseries; episodes 1–3 |
| 2014 | The Life of Rock with Brian Pern | Jess Hunt | Series 1; episode 3: "Death of Rock", & series 2; episode 3: "Bi-Polar Bear Aid" |
| 2014 | The Lost Honour of Christopher Jefferies | Janine | 2-part miniseries; parts one & two |
| 2015 | And Then There Were None | Ethel Rogers | 3-part miniseries; episode 1 |
| 2015 | Birthday | Lisa | Television film |
| 2015 | Midwinter of the Spirit | Reverend Merrily Watkins | 3-part miniseries; episodes 1–3 |
| 2015 | The Frankenstein Chronicles | Mary Shelley | Episodes 2–5 |
| 2016 | Reg | Sally Keys | Television film |
| 2016–2022 | Motherland | Julia Johnstone | Lead role. Series 1–3; 20 episodes |
| 2017 | Tracey Ullman's Show | Herself | Series 2; episode 3 |
| 2018 | Urban Myths | Agatha Christie | Series 2; episode 6: "Agatha Christie" |
| 2018 | Mother's Day | Wendy Parry | Television film |
| 2019 | The Conception of Terror | Jo Harrington | Miniseries; episode 1: "Casting the Runes" |
| 2019 | Christmas University Challenge | Herself – Contestant | Series 9; episode 4: "Liverpool v Hull" |
| 2019–2021 | Line of Duty | DCS Patricia Carmichael | Series 5 & 6; 5 episodes |
| 2019–2023 | Good Omens | Beelzebub | Series 1 & 2; 4 episodes |
| 2020 | The Kemps: All True | Lorna Kemp | Television film |
| 2020–2022 | Code 404 | Kelly Major | Main role. Series 1–3; 18 episodes |
| 2021 | The Irregulars | Edith Dubois | Episode 6: "Chapter Six: Hieracium Snowdoniense" |
| 2021 | Hollington Drive | Theresa Westcott | Main role. Episodes 1–4 |
| 2021 | Would I Lie to You? | Herself – Panellist | Series 14; episode 9 |
| 2022 | Mandy | Eva | Series 2; episode 4: "SpaceMandy" |
| 2022 | Ant & Dec's Saturday Night Takeaway | Herself – Guest announcer | Series 18; episode 5 |
| 2022 | Have I Got News for You | Herself – Guest presenter | Series 63; episode 7 |
| 2022 | Who Do You Think You Are? | Herself | Series 19; episode 4: "Anna Maxwell Martin" |
| 2022 | A Spy Among Friends | Lily Thomas | Miniseries; episodes 1–6 |
| 2023 | Steph's Packed Lunch | Herself – Guest host | 1 episode |
| 2024 | Until I Kill You | Delia Balmer | Episodes 1–4 |
| 2024 | A Good Girl's Guide to Murder | Leanne Fitz-Amobi | Episodes 1–6 |
| 2024 | Gavin & Stacey | Celebrant | Christmas special 2024 |
| 2024–present | Ludwig | Lucy Betts-Taylor | Main role |
| 2025 | Unforgivable | Katherine | Television film |
| 2026 | Steal | Senior MI5 official | Series 1, Episode 5 |
| 2026 | Star City | Lyudmilla Raskova | Main Role |
| 2026 | Heartstopper Forever | Sarah Nelson | Television film |

=== Theatre ===
| Year | Title | Role | Theatre | Notes |
|---|---|---|---|---|
| 2001 | The Little Foxes | Alexandra Giddens | Donmar Warehouse | |
| 2001–2002 | The Lion, the Witch and the Wardrobe | Lucy Pevensie | RSC at the Sadler's Wells Theatre | |
| 2002 | The Coast of Utopia | Alexandra / Maria / Tata | Royal National Theatre | |
| 2003 | Honour | Sophie | Royal National Theatre | |
| 2003 | Three Sisters | Irina Prozorova | Royal National Theatre | |
| 2003–2004 | His Dark Materials | Lyra Belacqua | Royal National Theatre | |
| 2004 | Dumb Show | Liz | Royal Court Theatre, West End | |
| 2006 | Other Hands | Hayley | Soho Theatre | |
| 2006–2007 | Cabaret | Sally Bowles | Lyric Theatre, West End | |
| 2008 | The Female of the Species | Molly Rivers | Vaudeville Theatre, West End | |
| 2010 | Measure for Measure | Isabella | Almeida Theatre | |
| 2013 | Di and Viv and Rose | Rose | Hampstead Theatre | |
| 2014 | King Lear | Regan | Royal National Theatre | |
| 2015–2016 | Macbeth | Lady Macbeth | Young Vic | |
| 2017 | Consent | Kitty | Royal National Theatre | |
| 2021 | Constellations | Marianne | Vaudeville Theatre, West End | |
| 2024 | The Constituent | Monica | The Old Vic | |

=== Readings and benefits ===
- The Lady of Larkspur Lotion (rehearsed reading) as Mrs. Hardwicke-Moore at the National Theatre (21 October 2002)
- Hello from Bertha (rehearsed reading) as Goldie at the National Theatre (22 October 2002)
- Collateral Damage II (poetry) at the National Theatre (14 March 2003)
- Songs of Innocence and Experience (poetry) at the National Theatre (18 February 2004)
- The Marriage of Heaven and Hell (poetry) at the National Theatre (25 February 2004)
- Will and Lyra as herself (interview) at the National Theatre (26 March 2004)
- After the Fire (rehearsed reading) at the National Theatre (7 March 2005)
- The Black Glove (rehearsed reading) at the National Theatre (15 March 2005)
- Snowbound (showcase) at the Royal National Theatre Studio (October 2005)
- The Entertainer (rehearsed reading) as Jean Rice at the Royal Court Theatre (16 January 2006)
- Top Girls (reading) as Pope Joan at the Royal Court Theatre (19 September 2008)
- Pencil (10-minute play in the 24 Hour Plays Celebrity Gala) at the Old Vic (1 November 2009)

=== Radio ===
- The Tall One as Samantha (BBC Radio 4, 1 to 5 September 2003)
- The Raj Quartet as Daphne Manners (BBC Radio 4, 10 April to 5 June 2005)
- The Ante Natal Clinic as Ros (BBC Radio 4, 19 January 2006)
- The Sea as Rose Jones (BBC Radio 4, 15 April 2006)
- Great Expectations as Estella Havisham (BBC Radio 4, 6 and 13 August 2006)
- The Invention of Childhood as one of several readers (BBC Radio 4, 25 September to 3 November 2006)
- Berlin – Soundz Decadent as herself (BBC Radio 2, 2 January 2007)
- Crooked House as Sophia Leonides (BBC Radio 4, 8 to 29 February 2008)
- Words and Music: The Soft Machine as one of two poetry readers (BBC Radio 3, 1 June 2008)
- The Portrait of a Lady as Isabel Archer (BBC Radio 4, 13 to 27 July 2008)
- Villette as Lucy Snowe (BBC Radio 4, 3 to 7 and 10 to 14 August 2009)
- Au Pairs as Dorika (BBC Radio 4, 7 to 11 September 2009)
- Chekhov's Seven and a Half Years as Olga in Three Sisters (BBC Radio 3, 24 January 2010)
- The New Radio 2 Arts Show with Claudia Winkleman as herself (BBC Radio 2, 15 March 2010)
- Words and Music: Malady as one of two readers (BBC Radio 3, 11 April 2010)
- The Wings of the Dove as Milly Theale (BBC Radio 4, 1, 8 and 15 August 2010)
- The White Devil as Vittoria Corombona (BBC Radio 3, 15 August 2010)
- Faust as Gretchen (BBC Radio 3, 19 September 2010)
- Juvenile Jane as the extract reader (BBC Radio 4, 23 November 2010)

=== Audiobooks ===
- Peet, Mal (December 2007). Tamar: A Novel of Espionage, Passion, and Betrayal. Narrated by Anton Lesser & Anna Maxwell Martin. Walker Books Ltd.
- Sedgwick, Marcus (May 2006). The Foreshadowing. Narrated by Anna Maxwell Martin. Orion Publishing Group Limited.
- Christie, Agatha (1949) [original novel]. Crooked House. Narrated by Anna Maxwell Martin & Rory Kinnear (BBC Audio, September 2010 ed.).
- James, Henry (1881) [original novel]. Portrait of a Lady. Dramatised by Rachel Joyce; narrated by Anna Maxwell Martin, Haydn Gwynne, Robert Bathurst & Gayle Hunnicutt (BBC Worldwide May 2013 ed.).
