= Matthew Warchus =

British director and dramatist (born 1966)

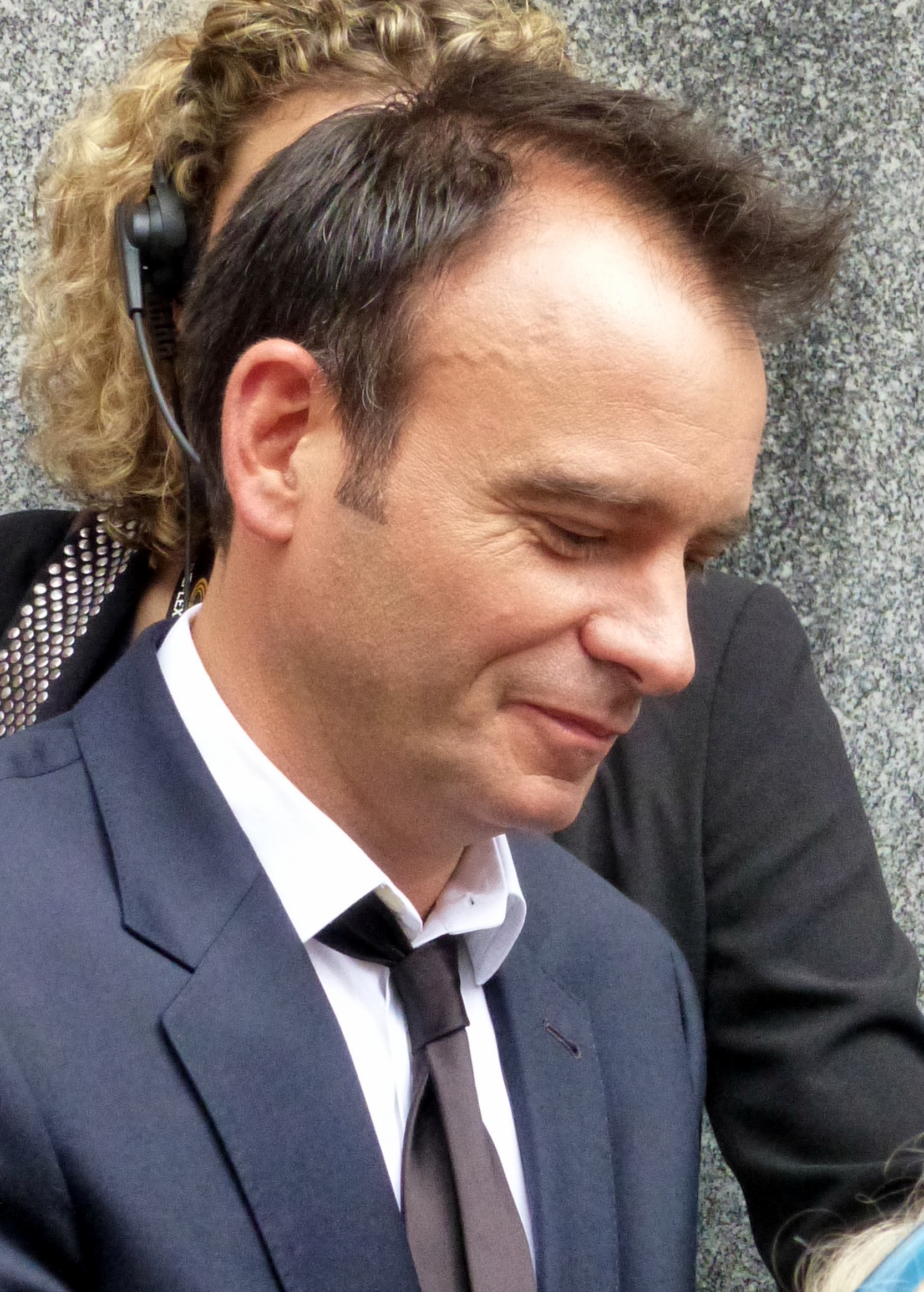
- Warchus at the 2014 Toronto International Film Festival
- Born: 24 October 1966 (age 60); Rochester, Kent, England
- Education: University of Bristol
- Occupations: Theatre director; playwright; filmmaker
- Notable work: Simpatico; The Lord of the Rings; Pride; Matilda the Musical
- Title: Artistic Director of The Old Vic (2015–present)
- Spouse: Lauren Ward
- Children: 3
- Awards: Laurence Olivier Award for Best Director; Tony Award for Best Direction of a Play; Drama Desk Award for Outstanding Direction of a Play

Matthew Warchus (born 24 October 1966) is an English theatre director, playwright, and filmmaker. He was the Artistic Director of London's The Old Vic from September 2015 to 2026.

== Early life and education ==
Warchus grew up in Selby, North Yorkshire where he attended Selby High School. He majored in music at Bristol University and studied in the school's department of drama.

== Career ==
=== Early theatre career ===
Warchus has directed for the National Youth Theatre, Bristol Old Vic, Donmar Warehouse, Royal Shakespeare Company, National Theatre, Opera North, West Yorkshire Playhouse, Welsh National Opera, English National Opera in the West End and on Broadway. He won the Globe's Most Promising Newcomer Award for Much Ado About Nothing in the West End, the Evening Standard Best Director award, and Olivier Award nominations for Henry V and Volpone.

Productions include Sejanus his Fall (Edinburgh), "Master Harold"...and the Boys (Bristol Old Vic), The Suicide, Coriolanus (National Youth Theatre), Life is a Dream, Plough and the Stars(West Yorkshire Playhouse), True West, (West Yorkshire Playhouse, Donmar Warehouse, Broadway), Henry V, The Devil is an Ass, Hamlet (RSC), Volpone (RNT), Troilus and Cressida (Opera North), Rake's Progress (Welsh National Opera), Falstaff (Opera North & ENO), and Art (West End and Broadway).

His 1997 productions of Hamlet at the Barbican Theatre and Falstaff at the English National Opera have been nominated for several Olivier Awards including Best Director. Hamlet was also seen at the Brooklyn Academy in New York and the Kennedy Center in Washington, D.C.

Warchus directed Yasmina Reza's plays The Unexpected Man (RSC) and Life x 3 (National Theatre) in London and New York (at, respectively, the Promenade Theatre and Circle in the Square Theatre). In 2000 he directed Sam Shepard's True West starring Philip Seymour Hoffman and John C. Reilly. In 2002 he directed Our House, at the Cambridge Theatre, a new musical written by Tim Firth featuring the music of Madness which won the Olivier Award for Best New Musical.

In 2007 he directed The Lord of the Rings, the stage adaptation of the novel The Lord of the Rings, which played at the Theatre Royal, Drury Lane from May 2007 to July 2008 and which he wrote the music and book for. It was the most expensive stage production ever at the time of its debut. In 2008 he directed David Mamet's Speed-the-Plow, starring Kevin Spacey and Jeff Goldblum and Alan Ayckbourn's trilogy of plays The Norman Conquests at London's The Old Vic, and Boeing Boeing at New York's Broadhurst Theatre for which he received a Tony Award nomination for Best Direction of a Play.

During the 2009 Broadway season, Warchus directed two productions. One was the critically lauded, 2009 Tony Award winner for Best Revival of a Play transfer of his Old Vic production of The Norman Conquests, for which he won the Drama Desk Award for Outstanding Director of a Play. The other was the 2009 Tony Award winner for Best Play, Yasmina Reza's God of Carnage, for which Warchus won the Tony Award for Best Direction of a Play.

In 2010, Warchus directed the acclaimed Royal Shakespeare Company musical Matilda, with a book by Dennis Kelly and music and lyrics by Tim Minchin, which transferred to the West End in October 2011 at the Cambridge Theatre, before opening at the Shubert Theatre on Broadway in March 2013. The musical has since gone on to tour the US, Australia and New Zealand, winning multiple awards with a record-breaking seven Olivier Awards including Best New Musical and Best Director for Warchus.

Warchus's production of Ghost: The Musical, a stage adaptation of the Academy Award winning 1990 film Ghost, premiered at the Manchester Opera House in March 2011, and opened at the West End's Piccadilly Theatre in July 2011 and closed on 6 October 2012. The show transferred to Broadway beginning at the Lunt Fontanne Theater on 15 March 2012 and closed on 18 August 2012. Ghost The Musical was on tour in UK and USA in 2013 while also playing in Budapest. It opened in Korea in November 2013.

In September 2024 he directed a revival of Seán O'Casey's Juno and the Paycock starring J. Smith-Cameron and Mark Rylance at the Gielgud Theatre in London's West End.

In 2026, he will direct a new musical Pride, based on the 2014 film which he also directed at the Sherman Theatre and Royal National Theatre.

=== Artistic Director of The Old Vic (2015–26) ===
In May 2014 Warchus was appointed Artistic Director of The Old Vic in London, succeeding Kevin Spacey. His first season began in September 2015 directing a new play, Future Conditional by Tamsin Oglesby, starring Rob Brydon. In 2016 he also directed The Master Builder by Henrik Ibsen starring Ralph Fiennes, The Caretaker by Harold Pinter starring Timothy Spall, Daniel Mays and George Mackay, and the world premiere of the new musical Groundhog Day with book by Danny Rubin and music and lyrics by Tim Minchin. The musical ran for 8 weeks from July to September 2016 before transferring to the August Wilson Theatre on Broadway from April to September 2017. The musical later returned to the Old Vic from May to August 2023 before playing at the Princess Theatre, Melbourne from January to April 2024.

His second season at the Old Vic saw him direct the 20th anniversary revival of 'Art' starring Rufus Sewell, Tim Key and Paul Ritter from December 2016 to February 2017 (followed by UK tours in 2018 and 2019).

For the 2017 Christmas season, Warchus directed a new adaptation of Charles Dickens' A Christmas Carol by Jack Thorne starring Rhys Ifans as Scrooge which has since returned to The Old Vic every year due to its popular demand starring Stephen Tompkinson, Paterson Joseph, Stephen Mangan, Owen Teale and Christopher Eccleston as Scrooge. It has also played the Lyceum Theatre, Broadway for the 2019 season a US tour in 2021 and the Comedy Theatre, Melbourne in 2022 and 2023.

In 2019 he directed a revival of Noël Coward's Present Laughter starring Andrew Scott, followed by Duncan Macmillan's Lungs starring Claire Foy and Matt Smith.

In 2020, Warchus was planned to direct Amy Herzog’s 4000 Miles starring Eileen Atkins and Timothée Chalamet in April to May 2020, however due to the COVID-19 pandemic, the production has been postponed with the rescheduled dates to be announced. Also his production of Lungs which was due to transfer with Claire Foy and Matt Smith reprising their roles to the Brooklyn Academy of Music, New York in March to April 2020 was also cancelled due to the pandemic.

During the COVID-19 pandemic a series called Old Vic: in Camera began broadcasting performances from the empty auditorium of The Old Vic live to audiences around the world via Zoom, beginning with a social distanced version of Lungs with Claire Foy and Matt Smith returning. This was followed by Three Kings by Stephen Beresford starring Andrew Scott, Faith Healer by Brian Friel starring Michael Sheen, David Threlfall and Indira Varma and A Christmas Carol (which was due to return for a fourth consecutive season) starring Andrew Lincoln as Scrooge.

In summer 2024, Warchus directed The Constituent, a political drama by Joe Penhall starring James Corden and Anna Maxwell Martin. In January 2025, he co-directed with Hofesh Shechter a new adaptation of Oedipus by Ella Hickson starring Rami Malek and Indira Varma. In September to November 2025, he directed Mary Page Marlowe starring Andrea Riseborough and Susan Sarandon.

In September 2026, Warchus stepped down as Artistic Director at The Old Vic after 11 years in the role.

=== Film career ===
In 1999, Warchus completed his debut feature film – an adaptation of Sam Shepard's play Simpatico – which he co-wrote and directed, starring Nick Nolte, Jeff Bridges, Albert Finney and Sharon Stone.

His film Pride was selected to be screened as part of the Directors' Fortnight section of the 2014 Cannes Film Festival, where it won the Queer Palm award on 23 May 2014.

A film adaptation of Matilda the Musical based on the stage musical, also directed by Warchus with screenplay by Dennis Kelly and songs by Tim Minchin was released by Netflix on 23 November 2022 in the United Kingdom and 9 December 2022 in the United States.

In December 2024, it was announced that Warchus will direct a remake of Chitty Chitty Bang Bang for Amazon MGM Studios and Eon Productions, with Enda Walsh writing the screenplay.

== Personal life ==
Warchus is married to American actress Lauren Ward, who played the role of Miss Honey in the Stratford-upon-Avon, London, and Broadway productions of Matilda the Musical. Ward and Warchus met when he directed her in the 2001 revival of Follies on Broadway. They have three children.

== Credits ==
=== Theatre ===
Year	Title	Theatre
1992	Much Ado About Nothing	Queen's Theatre
1992	Who's Afraid of Virginia Woolf?	West Yorkshire Playhouse
1992	Fiddler on the Roof	West Yorkshire Playhouse
1993	The Plough and the Stars	West Yorkshire Playhouse
1994	Death of a Salesman	West Yorkshire Playhouse
1994	Betrayal	West Yorkshire Playhouse
1994, 2000	True West	West Yorkshire Playhouse; Donmar Warehouse; Circle in the Square Theatre
1995	Henry V	Royal Shakespeare Company; Barbican Theatre
1995	Volpone	Royal National Theatre, Olivier
1995	Peter Pan	West Yorkshire Playhouse
1997	Hamlet	Royal Shakespeare Company; US tour
1996	'Art'	Wyndham's Theatre and Whitehall Theatre
1998	'Art'	Royale Theatre
2000	The Unexpected Man	Royal Shakespeare Company; Duchess Theatre; Promenade Theatre
2000, 2002, 2003	Life x 3	Royal National Theatre, Lyttleton; The Old Vic; UK tour Savoy Theatre; Circle in the Square Theatre
2001	Follies	Belasco Theatre
2002	The Winter's Tale	Royal Shakespeare Company
2002	Our House	Cambridge Theatre
2003	Tell Me on a Sunday	Gielgud Theatre; UK tour
2004	Endgame	Albery Theatre
2004	Buried Child	Royal National Theatre, Lyttleton
2006, 2007	The Lord of the Rings	Princess of Wales Theatre; Theatre Royal, Drury Lane
2007, 2008	Boeing-Boeing	Comedy Theatre; Longacre Theatre
2008	Speed-the-Plow	The Old Vic
2008	Our House	UK tour
2008, 2009	God of Carnage	Gielgud Theatre; Bernard B. Jacobs Theatre
2008, 2009	The Norman Conquests	The Old Vic; Circle in the Square Theatre
2010	La Bête	Comedy Theatre; Music Box Theatre
2010	Deathtrap	Noël Coward Theatre
2010	Matilda the Musical	Royal Shakespeare Company, Courtyard Theatre
2011	Ghost	Manchester Opera House and Piccadilly Theatre
2011	Matilda the Musical	Cambridge Theatre
2012	Ghost	Lunt-Fontanne Theatre
2013	Matilda the Musical	Shubert Theatre, Broadway
2015	Future Conditional	The Old Vic
2016	The Master Builder	The Old Vic
2016	The Caretaker	The Old Vic
2016	Groundhog Day	The Old Vic
2016	'Art'	The Old Vic
2017	Groundhog Day	August Wilson Theatre
2017	A Christmas Carol	The Old Vic
2018	A Christmas Carol	The Old Vic
2019	Present Laughter	The Old Vic
2019	Lungs	The Old Vic
2019	A Christmas Carol	The Old Vic and Lyceum Theatre
2020	Three Kings	The Old Vic (in camera)
2020	Faith Healer	The Old Vic (in camera)
2020	A Christmas Carol	The Old Vic (in camera)
2021	A Christmas Carol	The Old Vic
2022	A Christmas Carol	The Old Vic
2023	Groundhog Day	The Old Vic
2023	A Christmas Carol	The Old Vic
2024	Groundhog Day	Princess Theatre, Melbourne
2024	The Constituent	The Old Vic
2024	Juno and the Paycock	Gielgud Theatre
2024	A Christmas Carol	The Old Vic
2025	Oedipus	The Old Vic
2025	Mary Page Marlowe	The Old Vic
2025	A Christmas Carol	The Old Vic
2026	Pride	Sherman Theatre, Royal National Theatre, Dorfman and Bridge Theatre
2026	Martin Guerre	The Old Vic
2026	A Christmas Carol	The Old Vic

=== Film ===
- Simpatico (1999) (director, screenwriter, co-producer)
- Pride (2014) (director)
- Matilda the Musical (2022) (director)
- Chitty Chitty Bang Bang (in development) (director)

== Awards and nominations ==
=== Olivier Awards ===
Year	Category	Nominated work	Result
1996	Best Director	Volpone and Henry V	Nominated
1997	Best Director	Art	Nominated
1998	Best Director	Hamlet	Nominated
2012	Best Director	Matilda	Won
2017	Best Director	Groundhog Day	Nominated

=== Tony Awards ===
Year	Category	Nominated work	Result
1998	Best Direction of a Play	Art	Nominated
2000	Best Direction of a Play	True West	Nominated
2008	Best Direction of a Play	Boeing-Boeing	Nominated
2009	Best Direction of a Play	The Norman Conquests	Nominated
2009	Best Direction of a Play	God of Carnage	Won
2013	Best Direction of a Musical	Matilda	Nominated
2017	Best Direction of a Musical	Groundhog Day	Nominated

=== Drama Desk Awards ===
Year	Category	Nominated work	Result
2001	Outstanding Director of a Play	The Unexpected Man	Nominated
2008	Outstanding Director of a Play	Boeing-Boeing	Nominated
2009	Outstanding Director of a Play	The Norman Conquests	Won
2013	Outstanding Director of a Musical	Matilda	Nominated

=== Outer Critics Circle Awards ===
Year	Category	Nominated work	Result
1998	Outstanding Director of a Play	Art	Nominated
2009	Outstanding Director of a Play	The Norman Conquests	Won
2017	Outstanding Director of a Play	Groundhog Day	Nominated

=== British Independent Film Awards ===
Year	Category	Nominated work	Result
2014	Best Director	Pride	Nominated
