= Mood Music (play) =

- Written by: Joe Penhall
- Characters: Cat; Bernard; Vanessa; Ramsay; Miles; Seymour
- Original language: English
- Subject: The music industry
- Setting: A recording studio and consulting rooms in London

Premiere
- Date premiered: 21 April 2018
- Place premiered: The Old Vic, London

Mood Music is a play by Joe Penhall

== Production history ==
The play premiered at The Old Vic, London from 21 April to 16 June 2018 in a production directed by Roger Michell and starring Ben Chaplin as Bernard (who had assumed the role following the departure of Rhys Ifans) and Seána Kerslake as Cat.

In July 2020, during the COVID-19 pandemic, an archive recording of the Old Vic production was streamed on YouTube for one week as part of the Your Old Vic project.

== Cast and characters ==
| Character | London (2018) |
|---|---|
| Cat, a recording artist | Seána Kerslake |
| Bernard, a record producer | Ben Chaplin |
| Vanessa, her psychotherapist | Jemma Redgrave |
| Ramsay, his psychotherapist | Pip Carter |
| Miles, her lawyer | Kurt Egyiawan |
| Seymour, his lawyer | Neil Stuke |

== Reception ==
The production opened at the Old Vic to positive reviews, with five stars from the Evening Standard and four stars from The Times, The Guardian, The Independent and The Arts Desk.
