= Until I Kill You =

- Based on: Living with a Serial Killer by Delia Balmer
- Written by: Nick Stevens
- Directed by: Julia Ford
- Starring: Anna Maxwell Martin; Shaun Evans
- Music by: Carly Paradis
- Country of origin: United Kingdom
- Original language: English
- No. of series: 1
- No. of episodes: 4

Production
- Executive producers: Simon Heath; Lucy Roch; Nick Stevens
- Producer: Ken Horn
- Cinematography: Sam Thomas
- Editors: Patrick Hall; Jonathan Lucas
- Production company: World Productions

Original release
- Network: ITVX
- Release: 7 April 2024 (New Zealand); 3 November 2024 (United Kingdom)

Until I Kill You (working title Delia Balmer) is a four-part British true crime miniseries written by Nick Stevens and directed by Julia Ford, based on Delia Balmer's autobiographical book Living with a Serial Killer (2017). It first aired on TVNZ+ in New Zealand on 7 April 2024, and was also screened on the Canadian channel Hollywood Suite on 18 April 2024 before airing on ITV1/ITVX in the United Kingdom on 3 November 2024.

== Synopsis ==
The story is based on a true case, and the credits state that original documentation was used to match the script to events as far as possible, while introducing minor characters or changing minor details for dramatic effect.

Delia Balmer was a nurse at the Royal Free Hospital in London. She lived for several years in a relationship with a carpenter called John Sweeney, who later became physically abusive, including hitting and sexually assaulting her in a degrading manner. Later, after she had reported him to police and changed the locks on her doors, and while he was out on bail after being arrested, he attempted to murder her outside her home, leaving her with extensive injuries and close to death after a neighbour had beaten Sweeney off.

The series tells of Balmer's relationship with Sweeney, how chances were missed to protect her and get him convicted, and how Balmer was poorly treated by the system. Eventually Sweeney is tried first for attempted murder, and, seven years later, for the murder of his wife in Amsterdam years before meeting Balmer.

== Cast ==
- Anna Maxwell Martin as Delia Balmer
- Shaun Evans as John Sweeney
- Kevin Doyle as David
- Jack Franklin as Joshua Wilson
- Simon Harrison as Glenn Saunders
- Clare Foster as Eloise Chapman
- Stephanie Street as Janice Rainsworth
- Renu Brindle as Sister Tessa Waller

== Production ==
Delia Balmer's book, Living with a Serial Killer, was published in 2017. In February 2023, it was announced that Anna Maxwell Martin and Shaun Evans would star in Delia Balmer as Balmer and serial killer John Sweeney respectively. The four-part drama, based on Balmer's book, would be penned by Nick Stevens, directed by Julia Ford, and produced by Ken Horn for World Productions.

Balmer's book was republished in November 2024 under the same title as the TV series, Until I Kill You.

== Episodes ==
No.	Title	Directed by	Written by	Original release date	U.K. viewers (millions)
1	"Love"	Julia Ford	Nick Stevens	April 7, 2024 (New Zealand); April 18, 2024 (Canada); 3 November 2024 (United Kingdom)	N/A
2	"Hate"	Julia Ford	Nick Stevens	April 14, 2024 (New Zealand); April 25, 2024 (Canada); 4 November 2024 (United Kingdom)	N/A
3	"Healing"	Julia Ford	Nick Stevens	April 21, 2024 (New Zealand); May 2, 2024 (Canada); 5 November 2024 (United Kingdom)	N/A
4	"Justice"	Julia Ford	Nick Stevens	April 28, 2024 (New Zealand); May 9, 2024 (Canada); 6 November 2024 (United Kingdom)	N/A

== Release ==
The series was presented under the title Until I Kill You at the MIPCOM in October 2023 and confirmed to be on ITV's 2024 slate that December.

Until I Kill You first aired on TVNZ+ in New Zealand on 7 April 2024, and was broadcast in Canada on Hollywood Suite on 18 April 2024.

It had its UK premiere on ITV1 and ITVX in the United Kingdom on 3 November 2024. The series aired on ABC Television on 12 January 2025.

== Reception ==
The series was highly praised by many reviewers, in particular Anna Maxwell Martin's performance, with Lucy Mangan of The Guardian giving the series a five-star review.

Review aggregator website Rotten Tomatoes has a score of 100% for the series, based on 11 reviews, while Metacritic's score was 82, based on 6 reviews.
