= I Really Hate My Job =

- Directed by: Oliver Parker
- Written by: Jennifer Higgie
- Produced by: Andrew Higgie; Dominic Saville; Matthew Justice; Alan Greenspan
- Starring: Neve Campbell; Shirley Henderson; Alexandra Maria Lara; Anna Maxwell Martin; Oana Pellea
- Cinematography: Tony Miller
- Edited by: Mary Finlay
- Music by: Charlie Mole
- Production company: 3DD Productions
- Distributed by: 3DD Productions
- Release dates: 2 June 2007 (Transylvania); 2 July 2009 (Australia)
- Running time: 89 minutes
- Country: United Kingdom
- Language: English

I Really Hate My Job is a 2007 British comedy film directed by Oliver Parker and starring Neve Campbell, Shirley Henderson, Alexandra Maria Lara, Anna Maxwell Martin, Oana Pellea, and Danny Huston as himself. It is an independent film produced and distributed by 3DD Productions.

== Plot ==
I Really Hate My Job is the story of the lives of five women stuck working in a second-rate London restaurant with delusions of grandeur. The action takes place over a single evening. Customers come and go, unaware of the real concerns of these women: a rat or two in the kitchen, bitter arguments about life and art, as well as a coup d'état in the kitchen, all overshadowed by the anticipation of a booking by a famous Hollywood film star.

== Cast ==
The principal cast consists of:

- Neve Campbell as Abi (a waitress and an aspiring actress)
- Shirley Henderson as Alice (a kitchen assistant, acting chef on the evening in question, and an aspiring writer)
- Alexandra Maria Lara as Suzie (a waitress and an aspiring photographer)
- Anna Maxwell Martin as Madonna (the maître d')
- Oana Pellea as Rita (the dishwasher)
- Danny Huston as himself/Al Bowlly

== Release ==
The film received its North American premiere on 13 June 2007 at the Seattle International Film Festival, and by June 2008 had gone direct-to-video. It has also been shown on the Sundance Channel.
