= Joe Penhall =

English-Australian playwright and screenwriter

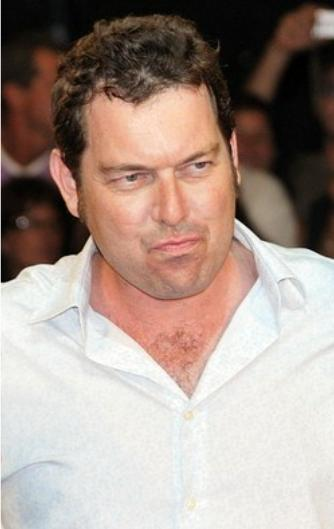
- Penhall at the 2009 Venice Film Festival for the promotion of The Road
- Born: Joe Scott Penhall; 1967 (age 58–59); London, England
- Occupations: Playwright; screenwriter
- Spouse: Emily McLaughlin
- Children: 2
- Writing career
- Notable work: Blue/Orange

Joe Scott Penhall (born 1967) is an English-Australian playwright and screenwriter, best known for his award-winning stage play Blue/Orange, the award-winning West End musical Sunny Afternoon and creating the Netflix original series Mindhunter.

== Early life ==
Penhall was born in London, and raised in Adelaide, Australia.

== Career ==
Penhall's first major play, Some Voices, premiered at the Royal Court Theatre's upstairs playing space in London in 1994. It was very well-received, winning the John Whiting Award, and has since been played off-Broadway twice. In 2000 Penhall adapted the play for a film with the same name directed by Simon Cellan Jones, starring Daniel Craig and Kelly Macdonald, which premiered at the Cannes Directors' Fortnight. Penhall returned to the Royal Court Theatre with his second full-length play Pale Horse, which also played in the Theatre Upstairs and featured Ray Winstone, who had starred in Some Voices. A dark play, Pale Horse tells the story of a bar keeper coming to terms with the sudden death of his wife.

Penhall adapted Ian McEwan's novel Enduring Love in 2004 to film starring Rhys Ifans and Daniel Craig. That same year he also wrote the screenplay for BBC2's BAFTA-nominated dramatisation of Jake Arnott's novel The Long Firm (1999), starring Mark Strong.

In 2000 Penhall's play Blue/Orange began its run at the National Theatre, directed by Roger Michell and starring Bill Nighy, Andrew Lincoln and Chiwetel Ejiofor. The play centres on two NHS doctors trying to deal with a sectioned young black schizophrenic patient; it was a huge success, winning Best New Play at the Evening Standard Theatre Awards, Laurence Olivier Awards, and at the Critics' Circle. It transferred to the West End at the Duchess Theatre the following year. Penhall adapted this play in 2005 for TV with a new cast. That same year he wrote and directed The Undertaker, his first short film, starring Rhys Ifans and premiering at the London Film Festival.

Penhall's follow-up play Dumb Show was staged at the Royal Court Theatre in 2004, focusing on tabloid journalism. It was directed by Terry Johnson. Penhall has called this a "small light play" as opposed to the "huge dark play" Blue/Orange.

Landscape With Weapon, about the invention of a weapon of mass destruction, was first performed at the National Theatre in 2007, directed again by Roger Michell and starring Tom Hollander and Julian Rhind-Tutt.

Penhall spent six years working on The Last King of Scotland, even flying to Uganda and meeting Idi Amin's henchmen; however, he requested his name be removed from the film after other writers were brought on board. Penhall adapted Cormac McCarthy's book The Road in 2009 for a film starring Viggo Mortensen; for this he received wide praise, scoring a 74% rating on Rotten Tomatoes, and was named by Variety Magazine as one of their Top Ten Screenwriters to watch.

In 2009 Penhall's detective drama Moses Jones, where he also served as executive producer, was shown on the BBC, winning a BAFTA for make-up design and Best Screenplay at the Roma Film Festival in 2009.

In 2011 Penhall returned to the theatre with two plays: Haunted Child, staged at the Royal Court Theatre with Sophie Okonedo, and Birthday, starring Stephen Mangan and directed by long-term collaborator Roger Michell.

Penhall's first stage musical, Sunny Afternoon, with music and lyrics by Ray Davies, premiered at the Hampstead Theatre in May 2014, before transferring to London's West End. The musical won four Laurence Olivier Awards in 2015, including for Best New Musical.

In 2017, Penhall created the Netflix series Mindhunter, directed by David Fincher.

In 2018, Penhall's play Mood Music premiered at The Old Vic, directed by Roger Michell and starring Ben Chaplin.

In 2023, Penhall was revealed to have been attached to write the third Sherlock Holmes film with star Robert Downey Jr. and director Dexter Fletcher before its development hell due to the COVID-19 pandemic.

In 2024, Penhall's play The Constituent premiered at The Old Vic, directed by Matthew Warchus and starring James Corden and Anna Maxwell Martin.

== Personal life ==
Penhall is married and lives in London. He has two children.

== Plays ==
- Wild Turkey (1993), premiered at the Old Red Lion Theatre, Islington
- Some Voices (1994), premiered at the Royal Court Theatre, directed by Ian Rickson
- Pale Horse (1995), premiered at the Royal Court Theatre, directed by Ian Rickson
- Love and Understanding (1997), premiered at the Bush Theatre, directed by Mike Bradwell
- The Bullet (1998), premiered at the Donmar Warehouse, directed by Dominic Cooke
- Blue/Orange (2000), premiered at the National Theatre, directed by Roger Michell
- Dumb Show (2004), premiered at the Royal Court Theatre, directed Terry Johnson
- Landscape With Weapon (2007), premiered at the National Theatre, directed Roger Michell
- Haunted Child (2011), premiered at the Royal Court Theatre, directed by Jeremy Herrin
- Birthday (2012), premiered at the Royal Court Theatre, directed by Roger Michell
- Sunny Afternoon (2014), premiered at the Hampstead Theatre, directed by Edward Hall
- Mood Music (2018), premiered at The Old Vic, directed by Roger Michell
- The Constituent (2024), premiered at The Old Vic, directed by Matthew Warchus

== Filmography ==
Film writer

- Go Back Out (1995)
- Some Voices (2000)
- Enduring Love (2004)
- Blue/Orange (2005)
- The Road (2009)
- Birthday (2015)
- King of Thieves (2018)

Short film

Year	Title	Director	Writer
2005	The Undertaker	Yes	Yes

Television

Year	Title	Writer	Executive Producer	Creator	Notes
2004	The Long Firm	Yes	No	No	4 episodes; Also made an uncredited cameo as "Gangster"
2009	Moses Jones	Yes	Yes	No	3 episodes
2017–2019	Mindhunter	Yes	Yes	Yes	Wrote 2 episodes

== Awards ==
- 1994: John Whiting Award for Some Voices
- 1995: Pearson Thames Television Award for Pale Horse
- 2000: Laurence Olivier Award Best New Play for Blue/Orange
- 2000: Evening Standard Theatre Award Best New Play for Blue/Orange
- 2000: Critics' Circle Theatre Awards Best New Play for Blue/Orange
- 2005: BAFTA nominee Best Drama Serial for The Long Firm
- 2009: Roma Film Festival Best Screenplay for Moses Jones
- 2015: Laurence Olivier Award Best New Musical for Sunny Afternoon
