= Enduring Love (film) =

- UK theatrical release poster
- Directed by: Roger Michell
- Screenplay by: Joe Penhall
- Based on: Enduring Love by Ian McEwan
- Produced by: Kevin Loader
- Starring: Daniel Craig; Rhys Ifans; Samantha Morton
- Cinematography: Haris Zambarloukos
- Edited by: Nicolas Gaster
- Music by: Jeremy Sams
- Production companies: Pathé Pictures; UK Film Council; FilmFour; Inside Track; Free Range Films; Ingenious Media
- Distributed by: Pathé Distribution (United Kingdom); Paramount Classics (United States)
- Release dates: 4 September 2004 (Telluride); 29 October 2004 (United States); 26 November 2004 (United Kingdom)
- Running time: 100 minutes
- Countries: United Kingdom; United States
- Language: English
- Box office: $1.8 million

Enduring Love is a 2004 psychological thriller film directed by Roger Michell and written by Joe Penhall. It is based on the 1997 novel of the same name by Ian McEwan. The film stars Daniel Craig, Rhys Ifans, Samantha Morton, Bill Nighy, Susan Lynch and Corin Redgrave.

Enduring Love was released in the United Kingdom on 26 November 2004, by Pathé. Reviews were mixed.

== Plot ==
As Joe and his girlfriend Claire picnic in the Oxfordshire countryside, a hot air balloon descends into the field. The pilot catches his leg in the anchor rope, while the only passenger, his grandson, is too scared to jump out.

Joe and three other men rush to help. As they grab the basket the wind gusts, and the balloon and rescuers are airborne. The rescuers drop safely to the ground, apart from one, who falls to his death. Joe goes to check his body, with fellow rescuer Jed. The balloon lands safely, the boy unscathed.

Recalling the events over dinner with Claire and friends Robin and Rachel, Joe reveals the impact the incident has had on him.

Days later, Joe, feeling guilty, imagines ways he could have saved the man. One day, Jed phones and asks him to come outside to discuss what happened. Joe looks out of the window and sees Jed standing across the road, staring up at Joe's window. Joe is reluctant, but Jed promises that he will leave Joe alone after he talks to him. After Jed makes some comments that make Joe uneasy, and he tells Jed to leave him alone.

Not too long after this, Joe visits a local bookshop. Jed arrives, appearing to have followed him. Joe, confused, tries to appease Jed, but Jed pursues Joe, telling him to "be brave". Joe is left rattled.

Joe visits the man's widow, who believes he was having an affair, because the police returned a picnic for two found in his car, along with an unknown woman's scarf. Joe decides to work out who was with the man on the day he died.

Joe becomes more consumed with the balloon incident, growing distant in his personal life. Jed continues to show up, sitting outside Joe's apartment, asking Joe to admit to what passed between them in the field, suggesting Joe is sending Jed messages by opening and closing his curtains. After Jed shows up at Joe's workplace one day, Joe publicly threatens Jed and tells him he does not want to see him at all.

Joe increasingly unravels, his behaviour alienating those around him. After he wakes Claire, raving about his theories, she tells Joe it is over between them.

Angry, Joe pays a visit to Jed and they argue. Jed bashes his head against the wall. Joe then gets drunk before going to Robin and Rachel's house, where he stays the night. When he wakes, his friend tells him Claire just called and said that Jed is at their house.

Joe races home and enters the apartment, finding Jed and Claire sitting together. Jed is badly beaten and falsely blames Joe. Claire appears to believe Jed's story. Jed suddenly stabs Claire with a kitchen knife and she falls to the floor, bleeding profusely. Joe then pretends to accept Jed into his life and they kiss. As they kiss, Joe grabs hold of the knife from Jed and stabs him. Jed falls to the floor, while Joe rushes to Claire's side and phones an ambulance.

Joe returns to the field where it all started, with the wife and daughter of the man who died. They are joined by a couple who explain that the woman's husband had not cheated on her, but was giving the couple a lift in his car. The picnic and scarf were theirs, and they were too embarrassed to get involved, as they were having an affair. In the field, Joe tells the man's daughter her father was very brave. As everyone else leaves, Claire joins Joe.

During the end credits, a scene in a psychiatric hospital reveals Jed alive, sitting at a desk writing. He turns to the camera and smiles.

== Cast ==
- Daniel Craig as Joe Rose
- Rhys Ifans as Jed Parry
- Samantha Morton as Claire Melton
- Bill Nighy as Robin
- Susan Lynch as Rachel
- Justin Salinger as Frank
- Ben Whishaw as Spud
- Andrew Lincoln as TV Producer
- Helen McCrory as Jean Logan
- Anna Maxwell Martin as Penny
- Corin Redgrave as The Professor

== Critical response ==
The film received mixed reviews. Rotten Tomatoes assigned the film a score of 59% based on 99 reviews. The site's critical consensus reads, "While it strains credibility and isn't ultimately as profound as it might first appear, Enduring Love is still an intriguing thriller fueled by strong performances from Rhys Ifans and Daniel Craig."

Empire, however, voted it number 426 on their list of the 500 greatest films ever made.

At RogerEbert.com, the film received 3 of 4 stars. The reviewer points out the film is among the few dealing with the fact that sometimes, we have a choice about what happens and how we react. It causes the viewer to ask, What would I have done?

The Guardian's Rob Mackie describes the film's opening scene as startling and beautifully shot, a 'vivid, colourful scene - bright red balloon, bright blue sky, bright green grass.' This is contrasted with the subsequently muted and downbeat. Giving the film a 3 out of 5 stars, he describes it as a 'thoughtful philosophical inquiry (which) becomes a less convincing thriller'. It 'intrigues but ultimately disappoints'.

Calling the film a 'jokeless gloomarama,' The New Yorker's Anthony Lane wrote, 'The ideas behind “Enduring Love” may be fascinating, but they don't play; they sulk.' He feels the lack of grip persists to the finale and the climax feels clenched and ridiculous.

Giving the film a 4 out of 5 stars, Nev Pierce of BBC News Online describes the film as, 'An intelligent and gripping dramatic thriller, Enduring Love is a real rarity: a film better than the book.' While admitting it isn't flawless, he calls it both ambitious and vigorous, and worthy of viewers' attention.

== See also ==
- Erotomania, the disorder depicted in the book and film.
