= The Constituent =

2024 political drama

- Original language: English
- Written by: Joe Penhall
- Characters: Alec; Monica; Mellor
- Genre: Political drama

Premiere
- Date: 13 June 2024
- Place: The Old Vic, London

The Constituent is a play by Joe Penhall.

== Production history ==
The play made its world premiere at The Old Vic, London on 13 June 2024 (with an official opening night on 25 June), running until 10 August. The play is directed by Matthew Warchus with a cast including James Corden as Alec, Anna Maxwell Martin as Monica and Zachary Hart as Mellor.

== Reception ==
Corden's performance received generally positive reviews.

- Akbar, Arifa (2024-06-25). "The Constituent review – timely Joe Penhall political drama makes the specific universal". The Guardian. ISSN 0261-3077.
- "James Corden proves he's a truly great actor in flawed play The Constituent - review". The Independent. 2024-06-26.
- Hemming, Sarah (2024-06-26). "The Constituent, Old Vic review — James Corden stars in a riveting and timely political drama". Financial Times.
- "The Constituent: a 'riveting' political drama starring James Corden". The Week. 2024-07-04.
