= A Christmas Carol (2017 play) =

2017 play by Jack Thorne based on Charles Dickens' novella

- Cover of the playtext, featuring Rhys Ifans as Scrooge
- Original language: English
- Written by: Jack Thorne
- Based on: A Christmas Carol by Charles Dickens
- Setting: London

Premiere
- Date: 20 November 2017
- Place: The Old Vic, London

A Christmas Carol is a play by Jack Thorne based on the 1843 novella of the same name by Charles Dickens.

The adaptation was written for The Old Vic in London where it premiered for the 2017 festive season and has returned every year since due to popular demand. It has also performed on Broadway (where it won 5 Tony Awards), on a US tour and in Melbourne.

== Production history ==
=== UK productions ===
==== London (2017–present) ====
The adaptation premiered at The Old Vic in London on 20 November 2017, running until 20 January 2018, starring Rhys Ifans as Ebenezer Scrooge. The production is directed by Matthew Warchus and designed by Rob Howell, with music composed and orchestrated by Chris Nightingale. Notably, the production's design transforms the Old Vic proscenium stage into the round with seating onstage and a walkway going through the centre of the stalls, creating a more immersive environment for the audience and the performers (who greet and hand out mince pies and satsumas to members of the audience before the play begins). The ensemble musicians also play before the show starts. During the scene at the Christmas feast, a turkey and Brussel sprouts come down on a zipwire.

Following the success of the production, it was revived at the Old Vic for the 2018 season starring Stephen Tompkinson as Scrooge before returning again for the 2019 season starring Paterson Joseph as Scrooge. The production was scheduled to return a third year for the 2020 season however, due to COVID-19 pandemic the production was performed as part of the Old Vic: In Camera series being broadcast live from the empty Old Vic auditorium and streamed to audiences via Zoom. Andrew Lincoln starred as Scrooge, with many members of the cast from previous years at the Old Vic returning. The production returned again (for audiences to attend in person) every year since starring Stephen Mangan (2021), Owen Teale (2022), Christopher Eccleston (2023), John Simm (2024) and Paul Hilton (2025) as Scrooge. The production will return for its tenth consecutive year for the 2026 season with Giles Terera as Scrooge.

As of January 2024, the production has raised £1.5 million globally for food poverty and deprivation-focused charities including Field Lane, The Felix Project, Coram Beanstalk, FoodCycle and FareShare.

==== Salford (2026) ====
The Old Vic production will make its UK regional premiere at The Lowry, Salford from 11 December 2026 to 10 January 2027. John Thomson was announced to play Scrooge.

=== US productions ===
==== Broadway (2019) ====
For the 2019 season, The Old Vic production opened on Broadway at the Lyceum Theatre from 7 November 2019, until 5 January 2020, starring Campbell Scott as Ebenezer Scrooge. Unlike the Old Vic, the production was adapted into a traditional proscenium arch setting. The production was due to Broadway for the 2020 season, but it was cancelled due to the COVID pandemic.

==== US tour and San Francisco (2021) ====
The Old Vic production toured the US opening at the First Interstate Center for the Arts, Spokane, Washington from 12 to 13 November 2021 followed by The Orpheum Theatre, Phoenix, Arizona (18–21 November), The Smith Center, Las Vegas (23–28 November), and the Ahmanson Theatre, Los Angeles (30 November – 1 January 2022) starring Bradley Whitford as Scrooge.

An identical production ran at the Golden Gate Theater, San Francisco from 26 November – 26 December 2021, starring Francois Battiste as Scrooge.

==== Off-Broadway (2025) ====
The Old Vic production ran Off-Broadway at the Perelman Performing Arts Center from 23 November 2025 until 4 January 2026, starring Michael Cerveris as Scrooge. The production will return from 20 November 2026 until 3 January 2027, starring Andy Karl as Scrooge.

=== Dublin (2019) ===
A new production ran at the Gate Theatre, Dublin from 15 November 2019 to 18 January 2020 which was directed by Selina Cartmell with set and lighting designed by Ciaran Bagnall and costumes designed by Katie Davenport.

=== Australian productions (2022–present) ===
The Old Vic production had its Australian premiere at the Comedy Theatre, Melbourne running from 12 November until 29 December 2022, starring David Wenham as Scrooge. The production returned in 2023 starring Owen Teale as Scrooge (reprising his role from the 2022 London revival) before returning again starring Erik Thomson (2024) and Lachy Hulme (2025) as Scrooge. It was announced that the Old Vic production will return to Australia from 11 November to 26 December 2027 at the Roslyn Packer Theatre at the Sydney Theatre Company, starring Tim Minchin as Scrooge.

== Cast and characters ==
=== London casts (2017-present) ===
Character	Original cast	1st revival	2nd revival	3rd revival (Old Vic: In Camera)	4th revival	5th revival	6th revival	7th revival	8th revival	9th revival
Character	2017/18	2018/19	2019/20	2020	2021/22	2022/23	2023/24	2024/25	2025/26	2026/27
Ebenezer Scrooge	Rhys Ifans	Stephen Tompkinson	Paterson Joseph	Andrew Lincoln	Stephen Mangan	Owen Teale	Christopher Eccleston	John Simm	Paul Hilton	Giles Terera
Bob Cratchit	John Dagleish	Peter Caulfield	Steven Miller	John Dagleish	Jack Shalloo	Roger Dipper	Rob Compton	Rob Compton	Rob Compton	Jack North
Tiny Tim	Toby Eden Grace Fincham Ethan Quinn Lenny Rush	Leo Lake Lara Mehmet Luka Petrovic Lenny Rush	Rayhaan Kufuor-Gray Lara Mehme Lenny Rush Eleanor Stollery	Rayhaan Kufuor-Gray Lara Mehme Lenny Rush Eleanor Stollery	Casey-Indigo Blackwood-Lashley Rayhaan Kufuor-Gray Eleanor Stollery Suri White	Casey-Indigo Blackwood-Lashley Freddie Marshall-Ellis Joe Vo Scanlon Holly Speed	Casey-Indigo Blackwood-Lashley Alexander Joseph Freddie Marshall-Ellis Freddie Merritt	Casey-Indigo Blackwood-Lashley Freddie Marshall-Ellis Freddie Merritt Vinnie Stone	Olive Mac Mahon Freddie Merritt Hannah Slater Vinnie Stone	Imuujin Bayarsaikhan Freddie Merritt Veronica Aeryn Onu Hannah Slater
Fred	Eugene McCoy	Eugene McCoy	Fred Haig	Eugene McCoy	Oli Higginson	Dominic Sibanda	Samuel Townsend	Ahmed Hamad	Matthew Durkan	Ewan Black
Father / Marley	Alex Gaumond	Michael Rouse	Andrew Langtree	Michael Rouse	Andrew Langtree	Sebastien Torkia	Andrew Langtree	Mark Goldthorp	Stuart Neal	Edward Harrison
Ghost of Christmas Past	Myra McFadyen	Myra McFadyen	Myra McFadyen	Myra McFadyen	Amanda Hadingue	Julie Jupp	Julie Jupp	Julie Jupp	Annie Wensak	Annie Wensak
Young Ebenezer	Jamie Cameron	Jamie Cameron	Kwêsi Edman	Samuel Townsend	Samuel Townsend	Samuel Townsend	Matthew Maddison	Connor Wood	Connor Wood	Khalid Daley
George	Jamie Cameron	Jamie Cameron	Kwêsi Edman	Samuel Townsend	Geraint Downing	Geraint Downing	Geraint Downing	Geraint Downing	Geraint Downing	Geraint Downing
Little Fan (Ghost of Christmas Yet to Come)	Melissa Allan	Witney White	Melissa Allan	Melissa Allan	Rose Shalloo	Melissa Allan	Rose Shalloo	Georgina Sadler	Lauren Jones	Kirsty MacLaren
Belle	Erin Doherty	Frances McNamee	Rebecca Trehearn	Gloria Obianyo	Karen Fishwick	Lydia White	Frances McNamee	Juliette Crosbie	Tanisha Spring	Carly Bawden
Fezziwig	Alastair Parker	Alastair Parker	James Staddon	Clive Rowe	James Staddon	Alastair Parker	Alastair Parker	Alastair Parker	Alastair Parker	Alastair Parker
Ghost of Christmas Present / Mrs Fezziwig	Golda Rosheuvel	Nichola Hughes	Gloria Onitiri	Golda Rosheuvel	Rachel John	Jenny Fitzpatrick	Gemma Knight Jones	Jenny Fitzpatrick	Kibong Tanji	Aiesha Naomi
Mrs Cratchit	Maria Omakinwa	Ava Brennan	Maria Omakinwa	Maria Omakinwa	Bridgette Amofah	Meesha Turner	Jessica Joslin	Kimmy Edwards	Parisa Shahmir	Gleanne Purcell-Brown
Jess	Siena Kelly	Rosanna Bates	Hollie Edwin	Rosanna Bates	Nicola Espallardo	Merryl Ansah	Hana Ichijo	Lillie-Pearl Wildman	Claire O’Leary	Claire O’Leary
Ferdy	Oliver Evans	Oliver Evans	Samuel Townsend	Sam Lathwood	Geraint Downing	Geraint Downing	Geraint Downing	Geraint Downing	Geraint Downing	Geraint Downing
Nicholas / Schoolmaster	Tim van Eyken	Tim van Eyken	Nick Hart	Tim van Eyken	Nick Hart	Billy Cullum	James Hume	Baker Mukasa	Nuwan Hugh Perera	Nuwan Hugh Perera

=== Other worldwide casts (2019 to present) ===
Character	Broadway	US tour	San Francisco	Melbourne				Off-Broadway		Salford	Sydney
Character	2019/20	2021	2021	2022	2023	2024	2025	2026	2026/27		2027
Ebenezer Scrooge	Campbell Scott	Bradley Whitford	Francois Battiste	David Wenham	Owen Teale	Erik Thomson	Lachy Hulme	Michael Cerveris	Andy Karl	John Thomson	Tim Minchin
Bob Cratchit	Dashiell Eaves	Dashiell Eaves	Ramzi Khalaf	Bernard Curry	Bernard Curry	Tim Wright	Daniel Frederiksen	Dashiell Eaves			
Tiny Tim	Sebastian Ortiz Jai Ram Srinivasan	Sebastian Ortiz Cade Robertson	Charlie Berghoffer IV Gabriel Kong	Alexis Abela Sasha Hampson Evie Rose Hennessy Theo Watson-Bonnice	Alexis Abela Mira Feldman Evie Rose Hennessy Libby Segal	Mira Feldman Wynton Inman Libby Segal Noah Sherburn	Emilia Di Gianvincenzo Mira Feldman Wynton Inman Noah Sherburn	Micah Fay Lupin Izzy Elena Rita			
Fred	Brandon Gill	Brandon Gill	LeRoy S. Graham III	Andrew Coshan	Andrew Coshan	Kaya Byrne	Andrew Coshan	George Abud			
Father / Marley	Chris Hoch	Chris Hoch	Ben Beckley	Anthony Harkin	Anthony Harkin	Tony Cogin	Tony Cogin	Chris Hoch			
Ghost of Christmas Past	Andrea Martin	Kate Burton	Nancy Opel	Debra Lawrance	Debra Lawrance	Alison Whyte	Natasha Herbert, Stephanie Lambourn	Nancy Opel			
Young Ebenezer	Dan Piering	Harry Thornton	Kris Saint-Louis	Cameron Bajrakatarevic-Hayward	Cameron Bajrakatarevic-Hayward	Felix Star	Felix Star	Maxim Chlumecky			
George	Matthew LaBlanca	Brett Ryback	Wiley Naman Strasser	Benjamin Colley	Benjamin Colley	Benjamin Colley	Jonathon Gardner	Dan Piering			
Little Fan (Ghost of Christmas Yet to Come)	Rachel Prather	Glory Yepassis-Zembrou	Monica Ho	Emily Nkomo	Aisha Aidara	Aisha Aidara	Emily Robinson	Ashlyn Maddox			
Belle	Sarah Hunt	Sarah Hunt	Ash Malloy	Sarah Morrison	Sarah Morrison	Sarah Morrison	Claire Warrillow	Julia Knitel			
Fezziwig	Evan Harrington	Evan Harrington	Colin Thomson	Nicholas Kong	Grant Piro	Grant Piro	Nicholas Kong	Paul Whitty			
Ghost of Christmas Present / Mrs Fezziwig	LaChanze	Alex Newell	Amber Iman	Samantha Morley	Samantha Morley	Samantha Morley	Samantha Morley	Crystal Lucas-Perry			
Mrs Cratchit	Erica Dorfler	Chante Carmel	Stephanie Lambourn	Stephanie Lambourn	Stephanie Lambourn	Stephanie Lambourn	Stephanie Lambourn	Rashidra Scott			
Jess	Hannah Elles	Grace Yoo	Annie Sherman	Melanie Bird	Deirdre Khoo	Kaori Maeda-Judge	Kaori Maeda-Judge	Madalynn Mathews			
Ferdy	Alex Nee	Alex Nee	Samuel Faustine	Cameron Taylor	Kaya Byrne	Cameron Taylor	Jack Van Staveren	Dan Piering			
Nicholas	Alex Nee	Alex Nee	Samuel Faustine	Cameron Taylor	Kaya Byrne	Cameron Taylor	Jack Van Staveren	Teddy Trice			

== List of carols used ==
- God Rest You Merry, Gentlemen
- It Came Upon the Midnight Clear
- Il est né, le divin Enfant
- I Saw Three Ships
- Wassail! Wassail! All Over the Town
- O Holy Night
- In the Bleak Midwinter
- Ding Dong Merrily on High
- Coventry Carol
- See, amid the Winter's Snow
- Joy to the World
- Silent Night

== Differences from the novella ==
In this production, Scrooge's father is revealed to be an uncaring drunkard who has plunged his family into huge debt and who emotionally abuses his son. Fezziwig is transformed from a merchant to an undertaker who hopes that Scrooge will marry his daughter and inherit his business. "Tiny Tim" Cratchit is not crippled in this production. After his reformation, Scrooge is reunited with Belle, his former fiancée, who had ended their engagement and married another man after fruitlessly waiting for Scrooge to become rich enough to become, in his own words, "a great man". He goes to Belle's house, where she is happy to learn of his change of heart, though both know that Belle cannot abandon her family. They exchange greetings before they part ways. All three of the ghosts are women, including Fan, Scrooge's sister, who is the Ghost of Christmas Yet to Come. The Ghost of Christmas Present decides to be known as Brenda at the end. The actress also plays the part of Mrs. Fezziwig. The actress playing the Ghost of Christmas Past is also in the ensemble.

== Awards and nominations ==
Year	Award	Category	Nominee	Result
2020	Tony Awards	Best Original Score	Christopher Nightingale	Won
2020	Tony Awards	Best Scenic Design in a Play	Rob Howell	Won
2020	Tony Awards	Best Costume Design in a Play	Rob Howell	Won
2020	Tony Awards	Best Lighting Design in a Play	Hugh Vanstone	Won
2020	Tony Awards	Best Sound Design	Simon Baker	Won
2020	Drama Desk Award	Outstanding Adaptation	Jack Thorne	Won
2020	Outer Critics Circle Award	Outstanding Orchestrations	Christopher Nightingale	Honoree
2020	Outer Critics Circle Award	Outstanding Sound Design	Simon Baker	Honoree
2020	Outer Critics Circle Award	Outstanding Scenic Design	Rob Howell	Honoree
2020	Outer Critics Circle Award	Outstanding Costume Design	Rob Howell	Honoree

== See also ==
- Adaptations of A Christmas Carol
