= Lungs (play) =

2011 play by Duncan Macmillan

- Written by: Duncan Macmillan

Premiere
- Date: September 28, 2011
- Place: Washington, D.C.

Lungs is a play written by Duncan Macmillan, which debuted in 2011 at the Studio Theatre in Washington, D.C.

== Synopsis ==
M and W, a young couple, find themselves examining the scope of their lives together and the world around them when they begin considering starting a family.

== Production history ==
=== World premiere (2011) ===
Lungs premiered in October 2011 at the Studio Theatre in Washington, D.C., directed by Aaron Posner and starring Ryan King and Brooke Bloom as M and W respectively. It also held its British debut that same month at the Crucible Theatre in Sheffield, directed by Richard Wilson, and starring Alistair Cope and Kate O'Flynn.

=== Canada (2014, 2015) ===
Canadian productions of the play were held at the Tarragon Theatre in Toronto in March 2014, starring Brendan Gall and Lesley Faulkner, and in February 2015 at the Verb Theatre, starring Kyle Jespersen and Anna Cummer.

=== London (2019, 2020) ===
A 2019 production of the play was hosted at The Old Vic starring Matt Smith and Claire Foy, with Matthew Warchus directing. Previews began in October prior to a November opening. This production was planned to transfer to the United States at the Brooklyn Academy of Music from 25 March – 19 April 2020. Smith and Foy were slated to reprise their roles. Due to the COVID-19 pandemic, this transfer was cancelled.

On 27 May 2020, it was announced that the 2019 Old Vic production would be reprised with Matt Smith and Claire Foy starring once again. Starting in June, it was part of Old Vic: In Camera, a project aiming to revive the theatre's revenue, which had been wiped out by the closure of theatres caused by the COVID-19 pandemic, through live streams and other digital focused works. Despite being live-streamed over the internet, tickets were limited to 1,000 per performance, representing the full capacity of the house of any regular performance at The Old Vic. Tickets were available at standard prices (£10–£65) for each performance.

== Cast and characters ==
Character	Washington, D.C.	Sheffield	Toronto	Calgary	London	Paris
Character	2011		2014	2015	2019	2026
W	Brooke Bloom	Kate O'Flynn	Lesley Faulkner	Anna Cummer	Claire Foy	Claire de La Rüe du Can
M	Ryan King	Alistair Cope	Brendan Gall	Kyle Jespersen	Matt Smith	Jean Chevalier (acteur)

== Critical reception ==
A 2011 review in The Washingtonian praised the play as "original and striking", but slighted the characters as "cliche". In her review for The Guardian, Lyn Gardner wrote: "Duncan Macmillan's distinctive, off-kilter love story is brutally honest, funny, edgy and current. It gives voice to a generation for whom uncertainty is a way of life through two flawed, but deeply human, people who you don't always like but start to feel you might love. It's bravely written, startlingly structured, and if it loses momentum in the final 30 minutes, Richard Wilson's sharp staging and two outstanding performers, Alistair Cope and Kate O'Flynn, keep it buzzing to the end."

A review in The Guardian by Arifa Akbar of the 2019 performances at The Old Vic, starring Matt Smith and Claire Foy, praised the production's leads and set design.

== Awards and nominations ==
The play received the 2013 Offie for Best New Play.

Claire Foy won Best Actress at the 2020 WhatsOnStage Awards for her performance as W in the 2019 Old Vic production.
