= Oana Pellea =

Romanian actress

Oana Pellea Grand Cross and Sash ranks of the Order of the Star of Romania
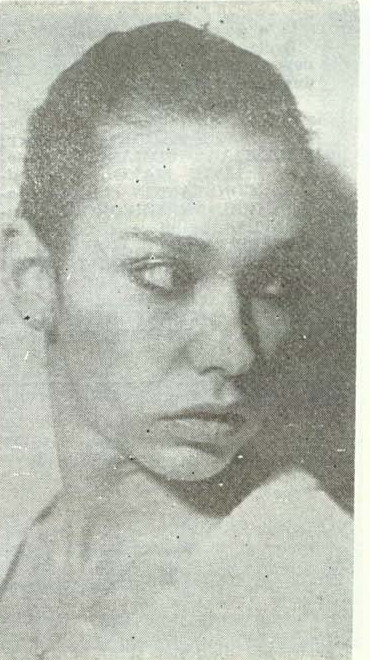
- Pellea in 1985
- Born: Oana Dariana Pellea; 29 January 1962 (age 63); Bucharest, Romania
- Occupation: Actress
- Father: Amza Pellea
- Website: www.oanapellea.com

Oana Dariana Pellea (born 29 January 1962) is a Romanian actress, and the daughter of actor Amza Pellea.

== Selected filmography ==
Year	Film	Role	Notes
2018	Kronk's New Groove (2005)	Waitress (Romanian dubbing)	
2009	Ashes and Blood		
2008	Bibliothèque Pascal	Rodica Paparu	
2007	Cu un pas înainte	Carmen Caragiu	
2007	Fire and Ice: The Dragon Chronicles	Queen Remini	
2007	I Really Hate My Job	Rita	
2006	Children of Men	Marichka	
2006	Fehér tenyér	Mom	
2005	Păcatele Evei	Patricia Manafu	
2004	Camera ascunsă	Pusi	
2003	Haute Tension	Alex's mother	
1995	State of Things	Alberta Costineanu	
1994	Nostradamus	Landlady	
1990	Cine are dreptate?	Lidia Dumitru	
1989	Maria Mirabela în Tranzistoria	Girs' mother	
1984	Concurs	Oana	
1972	Puterea și adevărul	Pioneer girl	

== Honours ==
- Order of the Star of Romania, Officer rank (December 1, 2000).
- (Romania) Romanian Royal Family: 74th Knight of the Royal Decoration of the Cross of the Romanian Royal House
