= Three Kings (play) =

- Original language: English
- Written by: Stephen Beresford

Premiere
- Date: 3 September 2020
- Place: The Old Vic, London (Old Vic: In Camera)

Three Kings is a one-person play by Stephen Beresford.

== Production history ==
The play premiered as part of The Old Vic, London's Old Vic: In Camera series broadcasting performances live from The Old Vic's empty auditorium to audiences worldwide during the COVID-19 pandemic. The play was written for and performed by Andrew Scott as Patrick and directed by Matthew Warchus, with Katy Rudd as associate director.

The play was due to be performed from 29 July to 1 August 2020, however Scott was forced to undergo minor surgery. The play was postponed to 3 to 5 September 2020.

The playtext will be published by Nick Hern Books on 10 September 2020.

== Critical reception ==
The play received positive reviews from critics and audiences with four star reviews from The Guardian, The Telegraph and BroadwayWorld.
