= Une saison au Congo =

- Original language: French
- Written by: Aimé Césaire
- Subject: anticolonial revolution
- Genre: political play
- Setting: Democratic Republic of the Congo, 1960s

Premiere
- Date: March 1967
- Place: Théâtre Vivant

Une saison au Congo (French pronunciation: [ynə sɛzɔ̃ o kɔ̃ɡo], A Season in the Congo) is a 1966 theatre play by Aimé Césaire, first performed in March 1967 in Brussels by the Théâtre Vivant. In September of the same year, the play was produced at the Venice Biennale. An English translation by Ralph Manheim was published by Grove in 1968; a new translation by Gayatri Chakravorty Spivak was published by Seagull Books in 2010.

It follows the political career of Patrice Lumumba, first president of the Republic of the Congo in Africa, taking a deeply pessimistic view of his fate.

The play depicts the last months of the life of Patrice Lumumba during the transition to independence of the Belgian Congo marked by conflicts with the secession of Katanga, supported by the Belgian and broader Western interests.

After its first performance in Belgium, the play was produced at the Venice Biennale in March 1967, then at the Théâtre de l'Est parisien by theatre director Jean-Marie Serreau on 4 October 1967. The play's most recent performance took place in the Théâtre national de la Colline in Paris in September 1989.
