= Dumb Show =

Play written by Joe Penhall

Dumb Show is a three-character play written by Joe Penhall. First published in 2004, the play centers around the story of an out-of-control former TV comic named Barry.

== Performances ==
Dumb Show first premiered at the Royal Court Theatre in London on September 4, 2004, directed by Terry Johnson. Dumb Show later made its American debut at the South Coast Repertory in Costa Mesa, California in September 2005. In 2011, Dumb Show was performed at Keswick's Theatre by the Lake.

== Plot ==
Dumb Show commences with a scene where a TV personality named Barry meets with private bankers, John and Jane. The bankers attempt to flatter Barry and win him over with vintage champagne. To craft an edgy after-dinner speech, John and Jane coax Barry into divulging certain intimate details of his personal life, but Barry has other plans. In reality, he intends to exploit John and Jane's eagerness to obtain what he desires, rather than reveal any personal information.

The tension mounts and the stakes rise as the three characters take turns out-witting one another and rewriting reality according to their agendas. In each turn, Dumb Show confronts questions of ethics, exploitation, and personal morality.
