= Charles Salzberg =

American novelist (b. 1946)

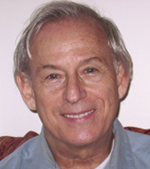
- Charles Salzberg (2009)
- Born: August 2, 1946 (age 80); New York City, U.S.
- Education: Syracuse University
- Occupations: Novelist, Journalist

Charles Salzberg (born 1946) is an American novelist, journalist, editor, and teacher.

== Early life and education ==
Salzberg was born in New York City in 1946. He graduated from Barnard School for Boys in 1963. He then attended Syracuse University, earning a bachelor's degree in English in 1967. He attended the Boston University School of Law from 1967 to 1968.

== Journalism ==
Salzberg got a job in the mail room at New York magazine in 1976. Between mail deliveries, he began to pitch article ideas to editor, Elizabeth Crowe. He then became a freelance writer, writing feature articles for periodicals such as Esquire Magazine, GQ, Elle Magazine, Redbook, Good Housekeeping and New York (magazine).

He has written book reviews for The New York Times, The Miami Herald, The Plain Dealer, and the Los Angeles Times.

== Books ==
Salzberg is the author of detective and crime fiction, as well as numerous works of nonfiction. His novels include the Henry Swann Detective Series: Swann's Last Song (2008), and Swann Dives In (2012). Swann's Last Song was a New York Post recommendation and was nominated for a Shamus Award. Salzberg's novel Devil in the Hole (2013) is based on the case of John List, who murdered his family and escaped conviction for 18 years.

His nonfiction work includes books about baseball, basketball, coaching, and such well-known personalities as Soupy Sales and wrestler Missy Hyatt.

== New York Writers Workshop and teaching ==
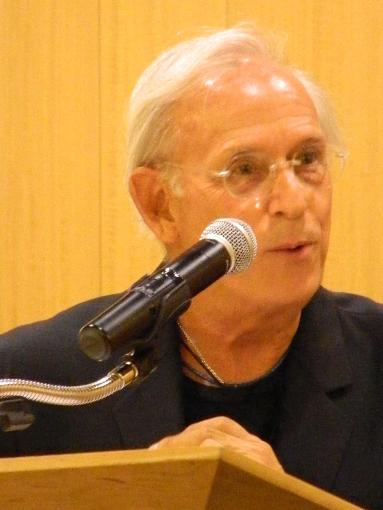
Charles Salzberg in New York entertaining the public at Barnes & Noble, August 9, 2013.

Salzberg is a well-known writing teacher and mentor and is a founding member of the New York Writers Workshop. His students have included Lauren Weisberger (author of The Devil Wears Prada), Joy Behar (co-host of The View), Susie Essman (co-star of Curb Your Enthusiasm), Elvira K. Gonzalez (author of Hurdles in the Dark), Sally Koslow (author of Little Pink Slips), Linda Yellin (author of The Last Blind Date and Such a Lovely Couple), and Stephanie Klein (author of Straight Up and Dirty).

Salzberg has taught writing at Sarah Lawrence College, the Open Center, and the Writer's Voice, and has served as Visiting Professor of Magazine Journalism at the S.I. Newhouse School of Public Communications at Syracuse University. In 1996, the magazine New York called him one of "New York's Great Teachers".

== Later years ==
As of 2010, Salzberg was serving as the fiction editor of the webzine Ducts, and was editor-in-chief of a publishing house he co-founded, Greenpoint Press.

== Bibliography ==
=== Novels ===
- Devil in the Hole (2013)
- Second Story Man (2018)
- Canary in the Coal Mine (2022)

=== Swann Series ===
- Swann's Down (2008)
- Swann's Lake of Despair (2008)
- Swann Dives In (2012)
- Swann's Last Song (2012)
- Swann's Way Out (2017)

=== Nonfiction ===
- From Set Shot to Slam Dunk: The Glory Days of Basketball in the Words of Those Who Played It (1988)
- Missy Hyatt: The First Lady of Wrestling (with Missy Hyatt) (2001)
- On a Clear Day They Could See Seventh Place: Baseball's Worst Teams (with George Robinson) (1991)
- Catch Them Being Good: Everything You Need to Know to Successfully Coach Girls (with Tony DiCicco) (2003)
- Soupy Sez: My Zany Life and Times (with Soupy Sales) (2003)
- The Mad Fisherman: Kick Some Bass with America's Wildest TV Host (with Charlie Moore) (2009)
