= Miranda Priestly =

Fictional magazine editor in "The Devil Wears Prada"

- Miranda Priestly as portrayed by Meryl Streep
- First appearance: The Devil Wears Prada (2003)
- Last appearance: The Devil Wears Prada 2 (2026)
- Created by: Lauren Weisberger
- Based on: Anna Wintour
- Adapted by: Aline Brosh McKenna (films); Kate Wetherhead (West End musical)
- Portrayed by: Meryl Streep (films); Vanessa Williams (original West End musical)

In-universe information
- Gender: Female
- Title(s): Editor-in-chief, US Runway
- Occupation: Magazine editor, fashion journalist
- Spouses: Hunter Tomlinson ("B-DAD") in novel Stephen (2nd husband) in film Stuart Simmons (3rd husband) in film sequel
- Children: Twin daughters Cassidy and Caroline, age 11

Miranda Priestly (born Miriam Princhek, October 25, 1949) is a fictional character in Lauren Weisberger's 2003 novel The Devil Wears Prada, played by Meryl Streep in the 2006 film adaptation of the novel and its 2026 sequel.

She is the New York City–based editor-in-chief of the fictional fashion magazine Runway. She is known for her cold demeanour and her immense power within the fashion world.

== Fictional biography ==
Miranda Priestly was born Miriam Princhek on October 25, 1949, in London's East End. Her family were poor but devout Orthodox Jews, who relied on the community for support because her father worked odd jobs and her mother died in childbirth. Miriam's grandmother moved in with the family to assist in raising the children. Miriam saved the small bills that her siblings would give her and worked as an assistant to a British designer. She made a name for herself in London's fashion world, studied French at night, and was made junior editor of Chic magazine in Paris. When she was twenty-four, Miriam changed her name to Miranda Priestly and replaced her rough accent with a sophisticated one. Miranda spent ten years at French Runway before Elias-Clark transferred her to American Runway. She, her twin daughters, and her husband moved to a penthouse apartment on Fifth Avenue and 76th Street. She is the editor-in-chief of Runway, a very chic and influential fashion magazine published by the Elias-Clark company. She is known for wearing a white Hermès scarf with her everyday outfit, and treating her subordinates in a manner that borders on emotional and psychological abuse.

While she reminds employees "a million girls would kill for this job", Priestly's cruel treatment of staff causes a high turnover rate among personal assistants; the focus of her characterization in the book and the film being her newest assistant, recent journalism graduate Andrea "Andy" Sachs.

Priestly has twin daughters (from her second of three husbands), Caroline and Cassidy, whom one review suggested "look like extras from The Omen."

In the film adaptation of the source novel, her past is not mentioned at all.

== Characterization ==
Her personage has been reviewed as 'Bossy' and 'Diva', referring her as an arrogant, megalomaniacal, egomaniacal and narcissistic person.

== Comparisons of the character ==
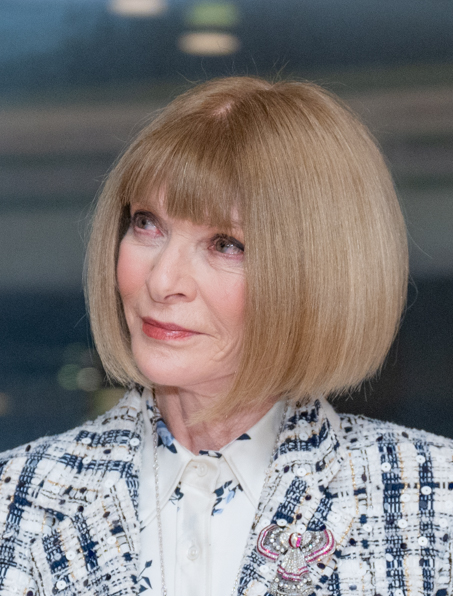
Anna Wintour, one of the celebrities who Priestly is often compared to and may have been based on.

=== Novel ===
Weisberger denies that Miranda Priestly is modelled on Vogue editor-in-chief Anna Wintour, saying in the publicity material for the book that her antics and demands are partially fictional and partially a composite of actual experiences she and her friends had in their first jobs. However, in the sequel, the writer describes Miranda at a basketball game with Rafael Nadal (a reference to Wintour's friendship with Roger Federer) and mentions that she is now the editorial director of the whole of Runway's parent company (a reference to Wintour's role as Condé Nast artistic director).

=== Film ===
In the film, she is a more sympathetic character than portrayed in the book. While she remains just as ruthless and manipulative as she was in the book, she is seen in a few moments of vulnerability three quarters of the way into the film when she confides to Andrea her distress about her failing marriage and the effect she is worried it will have on her daughters. The film incarnation of Priestly also speaks with an American accent, which strongly suggests the film character is not a Briton as portrayed in the novel.

Most, if not all reviews and articles of the movie made reference to Wintour. Nicknamed "Nuclear Wintour", Anna has been known to possess most of the same traits as Priestly, although she has shown more redeeming traits. Streep has told multiple reporters that she did not personally base her portrayal on Wintour, but instead on men she has known; Streep actually didn't meet Wintour until a pre-release screening of the movie. Other inspirations for Streep's portrayal include Cruella de Vil, Madame Medusa, Ursula, Martha Stewart, and the ghost of Joan Crawford from Mommie Dearest.

As for Miranda's appearance, Streep thought of the model Carmen Dell'Orefice, known for her trademark white bouffant. "I wanted a cross between her and the unassailable elegance and authority of Christine Lagarde", Streep said in a coverage for Variety.

Streep often said her performance was inspired by men, but kept their identities a closely guarded secret until the movie's tenth anniversary in 2016. "The voice I got from Clint Eastwood," Streep says. "He never, ever, ever raises his voice and everyone has to lean in to listen, and he is automatically the most powerful person in the room. But he is not funny. That I stole from Mike Nichols. The walk, I'm afraid, is mine".

== Critical reception ==
Streep received critical acclaim for her portrayal of Miranda, with reviewers taking note of how she made an extremely unsympathetic character far more complex than she had been in the novel. "With her silver hair and pale skin, her whispery diction as perfect as her posture, Ms. Streep's Miranda inspires both terror and a measure of awe," wrote A. O. Scott in The New York Times. "No longer simply the incarnation of evil, she is now a vision of aristocratic, purposeful and surprisingly human grace."

Liz Jones, former editor of British Marie Claire, wrote that the film was "a chilling reminder of the most surreal three years of my life." The only detail she found inaccurate was the absence of flowers in Miranda's Paris hotel room—during her tenure as editor, her rooms there or in Milan received so many flowers from designers that she thought she "had died prematurely." She personally vouched for Miranda's personality: "It took only a few weeks in the job for me to mutate into that strangely exotic and spoilt creature: the magazine maven, whose every whim, like those of Miranda ... must be pandered to."

Janet Brennan Croft of the University of Oklahoma reads the movie as a modern retelling of the Psyche myth (an early iteration of the heroine's journey), with Miranda in the role of Aphrodite, in which the character matures under the tutelage of an older female who at first seems purely to be tormenting her. "This authoritative female figure may even appear to be an enemy, at least at times, but actually mentors and guides [Psyche]'s growth into full participation in society." She compares the seemingly pointless tasks Miranda assigns Andy with those Aphrodite requests of Psyche: "By working through the conflict, the daughter/mentee also reaches a healthy balance of independence from and respect or love for the mother/mentor."

=== Awards and honors ===
Organizations	Ceremony	Category	Result	Ref.
Academy Awards	79th Academy Awards	Best Actress	Nominated	
BAFTA Awards	60th British Academy Film Awards	Best Actress in a Leading Role	Nominated	
Golden Globe Awards	64th Golden Globe Awards	Best Actress in a Motion Picture – Musical or Comedy	Won	
Screen Actors Guild Awards	13th Screen Actors Guild Awards	Outstanding Performance by a Female Actor in a Leading Role in a Motion Picture	Nominated	

== Impact and legacy ==
In May 2007, the popular American daytime soap opera General Hospital introduced the new character Kate Howard (originated by Megan Ward), patterned after the character of Miranda Priestly. Kate is much like Miranda, the only noticeable difference being age. Later that year, the "Money" episode from fourth season of The Office began with Michael Scott (Steve Carell), who had just been watching the film, yelling "Steak!" and "Get me Armani!" to the Dunder-Mifflin receptionist, Pam Beesly (Jenna Fischer). In February 2018, on American reality television series Keeping Up With the Kardashians (season 14 episode 18), Kris Jenner dressed as Miranda, channeling her 'Boss Lady' persona.

On the film's 10th anniversary, Alyssa Rosenberg wrote for The Washington Post that Miranda anticipated female antiheroines of popular television series of the later 2000s and 2010s such as Scandal's Olivia Pope and Cersei Lannister in Game of Thrones. Like them, she observes, Miranda competently assumes a position of authority often held by male characters, despite her moral failings, that she must defend against attempts to use her personal life to remove her from it, to "prov[e], as a creature of sentiment, that she never belonged there in the first place." In doing so, however successfully to herself and others, "she has zipped herself into a life as regimented and limited as a skintight pencil skirt." Variety observed that "[the characterization] showed Hollywood that it was never wise to underestimate a strong woman's worth."

In 2020, The Huffington Post's Monica Torres wrote about how much more she appreciated Miranda upon watching the film for the first time since her teens. Then, she had identified strongly with Andrea and hated Miranda. "But after rewatching as a working adult, I'm struck to find I have a much more complex understanding of [her], and of how many missteps her Runway staff take in their careers." Despite Andrea's dramatic break with her, Torres notes, Miranda still gives her a favorable job recommendation at the end. "That's better than most people would do for an employee who burnt a bridge!"
