= 2025 WhatsOnStage Awards =

British theatre awards

25th WhatsOnStage Awards
- Date: 9 February 2025
- Location: London Palladium
- Hosted by: Gina and Mazz Murray
- Most wins: Starlight Express (7)
- Most nominations: Starlight Express (9)

Television/radio coverage
- Produced by: Alex Wood, Darius Thompson, Alex Parker and Damian Sandys

The 25th WhatsOnStage Awards took place on 9 February 2025 at the London Palladium for the second time.

== Winners and nominees ==
Nominations opened on 7 November 2024. The nominees for the 25th WhatsOnStage Awards were announced in December 2024 by My Fair Lady stars Molly Lynch, David Seadon-Young and Minal Patel at the Curve Theatre in Leicester.

Best New Play	Best New Musical
Spirited Away; Giant; Kyoto; Princess Essex; Punch; Slave Play	Mean Girls; Babies; The Curious Case of Benjamin Button; The Devil Wears Prada; MJ the Musical; Why Am I So Single?
Best Play Revival	Best Musical Revival
Macbeth; A Raisin in the Sun; The Crucible; Oedipus; Romeo and Juliet; Waiting for Godot	Starlight Express; Dear Evan Hansen; Hadestown; Hello, Dolly!; Kiss Me, Kate; Oliver!
Best Performer in a Play	Best Supporting Performer in a Play
David Tennant, Macbeth; Emma D'Arcy, The Other Place; Tom Holland, Romeo and Juliet; Cush Jumbo, Macbeth; Anne Odeke, Princess Essex; Michael Sheen, Nye	Freema Agyeman, Romeo and Juliet; Romola Garai, Giant; Julie Hesmondhalgh, Punch; Teddy Hinde, The History Boys; Atsuki Mashiko, Spirited Away; Sharon Small, Nye
Best Performer in a Musical	Best Supporting Performer in a Musical
Imelda Staunton, Hello, Dolly!; Georgina Castle, Mean Girls; Jo Foster, Why Am I So Single?; Myles Frost, MJ the Musical; Leesa Tulley, Why Am I So Single?; Vanessa Williams, The Devil Wears Prada	Melanie La Barrie, Hadestown; Siobhan Athwal, Bhangra Nation; Amy Di Bartolomeo, The Devil Wears Prada; Grace Mouat, Mean Girls; Jaydon Vijn, Starlight Express; Tom Xander, Mean Girls
Best Takeover Performance	Best Professional Debut Performance
Layton Williams, Cabaret; Zoe Birkett, TINA – The Tina Turner Musical; Cara Delevingne, Cabaret; Craig Ryder, Moulin Rouge! the Musical; Alex Sawyer, Hamilton; Tobias Turley, Mamma Mia!	Jeevan Braich, Starlight Express; Esme Bowdler, Heathers the Musical; Stevie Doc, Mamma Mia!; Vasco Emauz, Back to the Future; Mia Kobayashi, Your Lie in April; Gerardine Sacdalan, & Juliet
Best Direction	Best Musical Direction/Supervision
Emma Rice, The Buddha of Suburbia; Eline Arbo, The Years; Robert Icke, Oedipus; Anthony Lau, The Crucible; James Macdonald, Waiting for Godot; Drew McOnie, The Artist	Tarek Merchant and Liam Robinson, Hadestown; Mark Aspinall and Darren Clark, The Curious Case of Benjamin Button; Mark Aspinall and Dan Turek, Fiddler on the Roof; Simon Baker and Niraj Chag, The Buddha of Suburbia; Alasdair Macrae, Macbeth; Matthew Malone, Brassed Off
Best Choreography	Best Sound Design
Christopher Wheeldon, MJ the Musical; Matthew Bourne, Oliver!; Julia Cheng, Fiddler on the Roof; Drew McOnie, The Artist; Rujata Vaidya, Bhangra Nation; Anthony Van Laast, Kiss Me, Kate	Gareth Fry, Macbeth; Paul Arditti, Brace Brace; Susan Bear, Maggie and Me; Nicola T Chang, Minority Report; Gareth Fry, Viola's Room; Gareth Owen, Starlight Express
Best Set Design	Best Costume Design
Tim Hatley, Starlight Express; Jon Bausor with puppetry by Toby Olié, Spirited Away; Miriam Buether, Kyoto; Es Devlin, Coriolanus; Kenneth MacLeod, Maggie and Me; Tom Scutt, Fiddler on the Roof	Gabriella Slade, Starlight Express; Sachiko Nakahara, Spirited Away; Lez Brotherston, Oliver!; Marg Horwell, The Picture of Dorian Gray; Tom Scutt, Fiddler on the Roof; Rae Smith, Hello, Dolly!
Best Lighting Design	Best Casting
Howard Hudson, Starlight Express; Paule Constable and Ben Jacobs, Oliver!; Jessica Hung Han Yun, Minority Report; Tim Lutkin, Coriolanus; Bruno Poet, Waiting for Godot; Zoe Spurr, The Artist	Harry Blumenau and Sarah-Jane Price, Why Am I So Single?; Amy Ball, The Years; Chloe Blake and Alastair Coomer, Till the Stars Come Down; Stuart Burt, Fiddler on the Roof; Anna Cooper, Macbeth; Lotte Hines, A Raisin in the Sun
Best Video Design	Best Wigs, Hair and Make Up Design
Andrzej Goulding, Starlight Express; David Bergman, The Picture of Dorian Gray; Grant Gee and Ellie Thompson, Bluets; Tal Rosner, Minority Report; Ash J Woodward, The Artist; Ash J Woodward, Fangirls	Jackie Saundercock and Campbell Young Associates, Starlight Express; Campbell Young Associates, The Devil Wears Prada; Marg Horwell, The Picture of Dorian Gray; Betty Marini, The Cabinet Minister; Hiroaki Miyauchi, Spirited Away; Georgia Nosal, The Artist
Best Off-West End Production	Best Regional Production
Diary of a Gay Disaster; Brace Brace; Dear Young Monster; Kenrex; Mulatto Boy; Some Mothers Do 'Ave 'Em	Oliver!; 42 Balloons; The Artist; Becoming Nancy; Brassed Off; Dear Evan Hansen
Best Concert Event	Best West End Show
Something Rotten! – In Concert; Gypsy the Musical in Concert; I Am Harvey Milk; Pippin – 50th Anniversary Concert; Sondheim on Sondheim; Spring Awakening: 15th Anniversary Concert	Six; Cabaret; Hamilton; Les Misérables; Mamma Mia!; Operation Mincemeat
Special Award: Services to UK Theatre
Paule Constable (Lighting Designer)

== Productions with multiple accolades ==
=== Multiple wins ===
- 7 wins: Starlight Express
- 2 wins: Macbeth, Hadestown

=== Multiple nominations ===
- 9 nominations: Starlight Express
- 6 nominations: The Artist, Macbeth
- 5 nominations: Fiddler on the Roof, Oliver!, Spirited Away
- 4 nominations: The Devil Wears Prada, Mean Girls, Why Am I So Single?
- 3 nominations: Cabaret, Hadestown, Hello, Dolly!, Mamma Mia!, MJ the Musical, The Picture of Dorian Gray, Romeo and Juliet, Waiting for Godot
- 2 nominations: Bhangra Nation, Brace Brace, Brassed Off, The Buddha of Suburbia, Coriolanus, The Crucible, The Curious Case of Benjamin Button, Dear Evan Hansen, Giant, Hamilton, Kiss Me, Kate, Kyoto, Maggie and Me, Nye, Oedipus, Princess Essex, Punch, A Raisin in the Sun, The Years
