= Everyone Worth Knowing =

2005 novel by Lauren Weisberger

- Paperback edition
- Author: Lauren Weisberger
- Cover artist: Evan Gaffney (design); Nick Dewar (illustration)
- Language: English
- Genre: Chick lit novel
- Publisher: Downtown Press
- Publication date: 2005
- Publication place: United States
- Media type: Print (Hardback, Paperback)
- Pages: 367 pp
- ISBN: 0-7432-6233-6
- OCLC: 69172493

Everyone Worth Knowing is Lauren Weisberger's second novel. Published in 2005, its plot surrounds lead character Bette Robinson, a single woman in New York City who is caught up in the city's party circuit through her new job in public relations.

The novel is similar in some ways to her bestselling debut, The Devil Wears Prada. Unlike The Devil Wears Prada, however, the novel was not commercially successful.

== Plot introduction ==
The story takes place in New York City with departures to Istanbul and Poughkeepsie, New York and is probably intended to be in the mid-2000s, probably in 2005; the Iraq War is referred to in passing and the 2004 U.S. presidential election is discussed as a recent event.

=== Explanation of title ===
I have an office full of people whose job it is to know everyone worth knowing. Thirty-five thousand names, actually, and we can get in touch with any of them at any time. It's what we do.

— Kelly, describing her public relations business to Bette.

== Plot summary ==
Shaken by the news that her best friend Penelope has gotten engaged to Avery, who neither she nor Penelope's other friends think is right for her, Bette Robinson abruptly quits her job at UBS, the investment banking firm where she has worked in the five years since she and Penelope graduated from Emory University. She does little to find a new direction in life until her uncle Will, an aging nationally syndicated entertainment columnist, introduces her to event planner Kelly.

Bette finds herself working for Kelly & Co., where she is tasked with planning parties, eating and drinking at the city's most fashionable night spots, and becomes a regular subject of a popular online gossip column, whose anonymous author seems determined to link her romantically to wealthy playboy Philip Weston. While she finds Philip somewhat attractive and the association becomes of great benefit to her in her new job, she is later drawn to Sammy, a bouncer at Bungalow 8, a New York City nightclub, who is from her hometown of Poughkeepsie and harbors ambitions of being a chef.

The two connect on a trip to Istanbul, and Sammy's culinary skills impress Bette's parents, former 1960s radicals, on a Thanksgiving trip back to Poughkeepsie. Sammy is tied to a wealthy socialite, and dreams of escaping the high life and opening a small restaurant. Bette, meanwhile, finds herself growing distant from Penelope and her other friends, and faces the choice of being the person she once was or the one she is becoming.

== Characters ==
- Bettina "Bette" Robinson, a 27-year-old single woman living in Manhattan. With her personal and professional lives stagnant, she leaves her investment banking job abruptly and winds up working for a top public relations firm. She is secretly addicted to reading trashy romance novels and belongs to a reading group of similarly inclined women.
- Penelope ("Pen" for short), Bette's friend from their days at Emory University and co-worker at UBS, despite their very different backgrounds. In the first chapter, she becomes engaged to Avery, a long-time family friend Bette (and other friends of Pen) don't think is right for her.
- Will Davis, Bette's uncle, writer of the once-popular "Will of the People" syndicated entertainment column whose writings have increasingly taken a bent toward politically conservative rants.
- Simon, Will's partner, who remains deeply in love with him despite vastly different political leanings.
- Kelly, Bette's boss, who runs the hot public relations firm Kelly & Co.
- Philip Weston, a wealthy British playboy, nominally a lawyer, to whom Bette is publicly linked as a girlfriend even though the two are never more than friends. She finds him attractive despite a cruel streak and a condescending attitude to women, until she comes across him having sex with another man.
- Abigail "Abby" Abrams, an acquaintance of Bette and Pen from Emory who writes as "Ellie Insider", an online gossip columnist for the fictional website New York Scoop, while she is ostensibly just another freelance writer. A sociopath, she delights in causing emotional pain to other women, without seeming to do so directly, and will advance her interests by using people in any way possible, including sexually.
- Samuel "Sammy" Stevens, a bouncer at Bungalow 8 and aspiring chef. Bette knew him in high school, although not well, and is increasingly drawn to him.
- Avery Wainwright, Pen's fiancé. Like her, he is from New York's established society. However, he seems to have no career plans, other than applying to law school to put that decision off for a few more years.
- Elisa, a co-worker of Bette's at Kelly & Co. A cocaine addict, she secretly feeds information about Bette to Abby out of jealousy over her perceived relationship with Phillip.
- Davide, another Kelly & Co. employee of vaguely defined, probably Italian background, he and his family are apparently wealthy and profligate enough for him to be eligible for an American Express black card.
- Robert Robinson, Bette's father, a professor of ecology at Vassar College. His wife works for the college's health center. The two met at Berkeley in the 1960s, where they became the political radicals they remain today, to the point that they do not celebrate Thanksgiving and were once wanted by the FBI. Robert is a bit less stringent than her, however, secretly complimenting Sammy the night before the holiday for making the best meal he'd had in ages even if it wasn't strictly organic and vegetarian.

Since Kelly & Co.'s primary business is sponsoring parties to which many celebrities are invited, many real-life notables are depicted. Among the most prominent are Hugh Hefner, Jay-Z, James Gandolfini, Ashanti, and Jerry Seinfeld.

There is a reference in a nightclub to "that ugly little lesbian troll blogger who can't stop writing about how much blow she does every night", which is believed to be a reference to Elizabeth Spiers of Gawker Media, in retaliation for a disparaging remark she denies making about Weisberger.

== Major themes ==
Like The Devil Wears Prada, Everyone Worth Knowing is essentially a morality play in which an unglamorous young single woman is suddenly thrust into a glamorous New York City industry and slowly becomes comfortable in it, despite keeping herself at a distance. Her career comes at the expense of her relationship with family and friends, and she ultimately chooses to decisively reject it and begin to get what she really needs. Unlike the novel's predecessor, however, it depicts far more decadent behavior from its wealthy elite, including casual sex, frequent illegal drug use, and women starving themselves to the point of passing out from sheer hunger.

== Foreign titles ==
Although in most countries the book has the same title, or a direct translation, the title in some European countries is Gossip and Gucci, but in Spain the book is called How to be the coolest in New York, in Finland VIP-ihmisiä (VIP-people), in Sweden Alla var där (Everyone was there), in Greece Η βασίλισσα των party (The queen of parties), in France People or not People and in Italy is Al diavolo piace Dolce (The devil likes Dolce "& Gabbana"). This has to do with the success of The devil wears Prada. The cover art in the Netherlands is also very similar to the movie's poster. The Polish title is Butler Wears Gabbana Suit.

== Allusions and references to other works ==
Bette's guilty pleasure leads to many romance novel titles, possibly fictional, being mentioned, such as The Very Bad Boy and Her Royal Bodyguard. On the plane to Istanbul, the characters watch Quentin Tarantino's Pulp Fiction.

== Critical reception and sales ==
Weisberger's second novel received generally unfavorable reviews. The New York Times Book Review described it as "fatuous, clunky." USA Today called it "lackluster imitation," and Entertainment Weekly said it was "ho-hum rehash."

Despite debuting on the New York Times Best Seller List at #10, it dropped off the list after two weeks and its sales were disappointing. Simon & Schuster, the novel's publisher, paid Weisberger $1 million for the novel.
