= The Devil Wears Prada (musical) =

American stage musical

- A New Musical
- West End Promotional Poster
- Music: Elton John
- Lyrics: Shaina Taub; Mark Sonnenblick
- Book: Kate Wetherhead
- Basis: The Devil Wears Prada by Lauren Weisberger; The Devil Wears Prada by Aline Brosh McKenna
- Premiere: July 19, 2022: James M. Nederlander Theatre, Chicago
- Productions: 2022 Chicago; 2024 Plymouth; 2024 West End

The Devil Wears Prada is a musical based on the 2003 novel of the same name by Lauren Weisberger as well as the 2006 film of the same name with a screenplay by Aline Brosh McKenna. The musical has music by Elton John, lyrics by Shaina Taub and Mark Sonnenblick, and a book by Kate Wetherhead. The musical is produced by Kevin McCollum and John's Rocket Entertainment and presented by special arrangement with Buena Vista Theatrical.

== Plot ==
Andy Sachs, a recent college graduate with dreams of becoming a journalist, moves to New York City and unexpectedly lands a job as assistant to Miranda Priestly, the powerful and feared editor-in-chief of Runway magazine. Despite having no interest in fashion, Andy accepts the position, hoping it will open doors for her writing career.

At first, Andy struggles to survive in the fast-paced, high-pressure environment. Her co-workers, including Miranda's senior assistant Emily, mock her lack of style, and Miranda constantly demands perfection. Overwhelmed and frustrated, Andy nearly quits, but after encouragement from Nigel, Runway's creative director, she decides to adapt. With Nigel's help, she undergoes a stunning transformation in her wardrobe and attitude, impressing Miranda and her colleagues.

As Andy becomes more skilled and confident, she also becomes more distant from her boyfriend Nate and her old friends, who feel she is losing herself to the fashion world. When Miranda's marriage begins to collapse and her job is threatened, Andy becomes deeply entangled in the politics of Runway. Emily falls ill before the Paris Fashion Week trip, and Miranda chooses Andy to go in her place, leaving Emily heartbroken.

In Paris, Andy experiences the height of luxury and success, but she also witnesses the personal sacrifices that Miranda makes to stay on top. When Miranda betrays Nigel to secure her own power, Andy is disillusioned by how ruthless the industry can be. Realizing she no longer wants to follow the same path, Andy quits her job and leaves Runway, ready to pursue her own dreams on her own terms.

Later, as she starts a new chapter in her career, Andy glimpses Miranda from afar. Miranda gives a subtle nod of approval, acknowledging Andy's growth and independence before moving on with her usual poise.

== Background ==
In 2015, it was reported that Broadway producer Kevin McCollum had signed a deal two years earlier with 20th Century Fox to develop some of the films from its back catalog into musicals for the stage. Two he expressed particular interest in were Mrs. Doubtfire (1993) and The Devil Wears Prada. Early in 2017, McCollum announced that in partnership with Fox Stage Productions, he was developing a musical version of The Devil Wears Prada (based on both the film and the book). Elton John and Shaina Taub would be writing the score and lyrics for the project with playwright Paul Rudnick, who had written some early scenes for the screenplay, writing the book and lyrics. McCollum did not say when he expected it to premiere but hoped it would eventually play on Broadway.

In July 2019, the show held its first industry-only presentation of the initial reading for the show. It featured Emily Skinner as Miranda Priestly, Krystina Alabado as Andy, Heléne Yorke as Emily and Mario Cantone as Nigel. There had been no announcement about future workshops or tryouts before the anticipated Broadway run. Daniel Hoyos led the company management team with Alexa Bishop and Bella Cordova.

== Production history ==
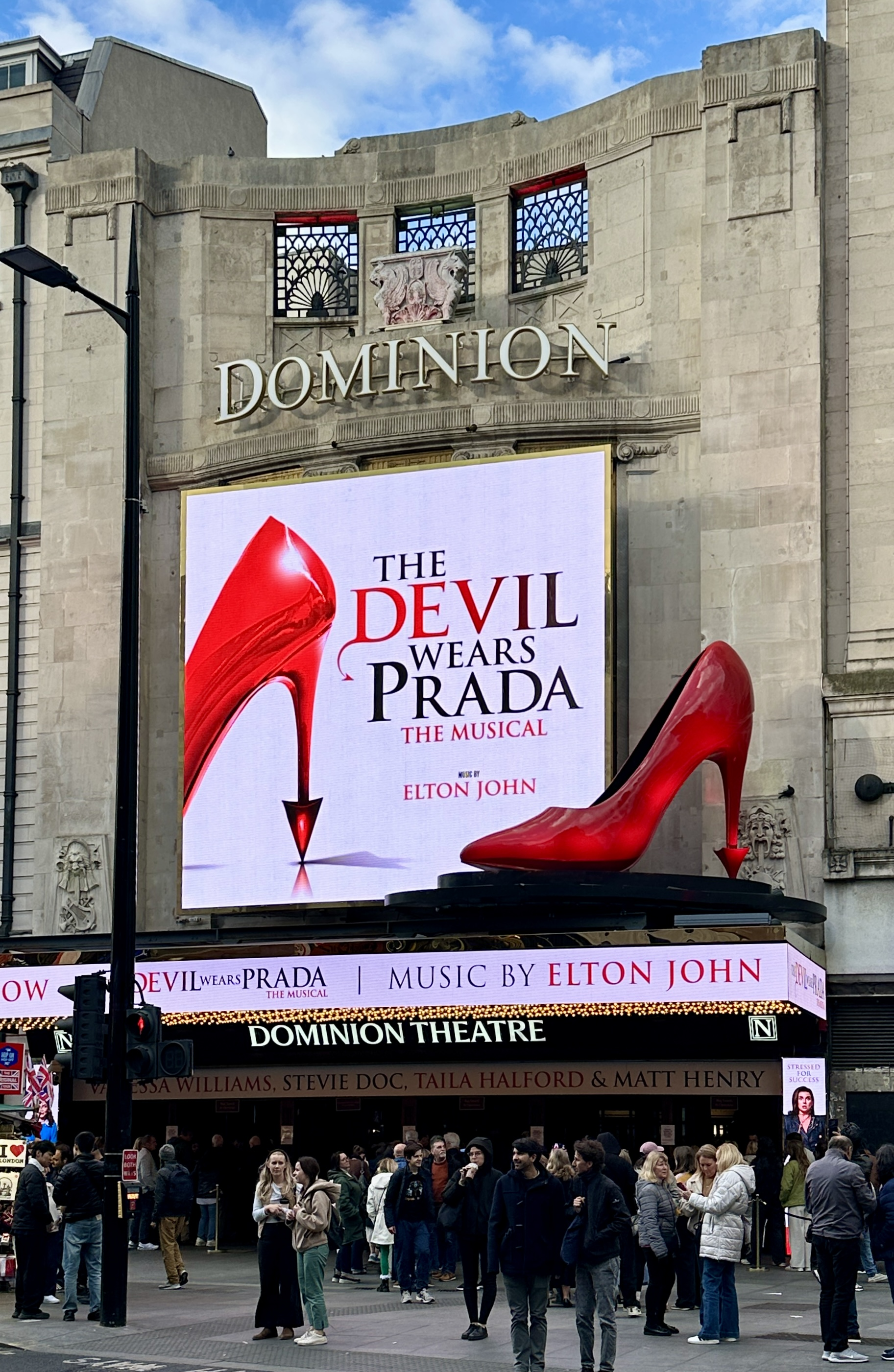
The Devil Wears Prada at the Dominion Theatre, London, in 2026

=== Chicago (2022) ===
In September 2019, a premiere run was announced for July and August 2020 at the James M. Nederlander Theatre in Chicago. According to producer Kevin McCollum, it was important to director Anna D. Shapiro, artistic director of the Steppenwolf Theater Company, also located in Chicago, to have the show premiere there.

In December 2019, the Chicago production was postponed for a year to start in July 2021, to allow the creative team more time to work on the show. Beth Leavel was announced to play the role of Miranda Priestly, with Taylor Iman Jones in the role of Andy Sachs. In January 2021, producers announced that the show would be delayed another year to July 2022, due to the coronavirus pandemic.

The Chicago production played its first preview performance on July 19, 2022, and played a limited run through August 21. The run was billed as pre-Broadway and the cast included the previously announced Jones and Leavel, alongside Javier Muñoz as Nigel Owens, Christiana Cole as Lauren, Megan Masako Haley as Emily Charlton, Tiffany Mann as Kayla, and Michael Tacconi as Nate Angstrom. In a September 2022 interview with Zoe Ball, Sir Elton John stated the show was not ready for subsequent stagings, adding "It'll be ready in about another year."

=== Plymouth/West End (2024) ===
On September 13, 2023, it was announced that the musical would have its UK premiere at the Theatre Royal, Plymouth as an exclusive preview engagement in July 2024 before a scheduled opening at the Dominion Theatre in London's West End in October 2024. It would be a new production directed and choreographed by Jerry Mitchell with set design by Tim Hatley, costume design by Gregg Barnes, lighting design by Bruno Poet, sound design by Gareth Owen and casting by Jill Green CDG. Due to Taub performing in her musical Suffs, Mark Sonnenblick joined the creative team as an additional lyricist, as well as providing revisions in direct consultation with Taub.

In February 2024, Vanessa Williams was announced as Miranda Priestly, with British actor Matt Henry joining her as Nigel. Full casting was announced in June 2024. Joining Williams and Henry are Georgie Buckland as Andy, Amy Di Bartolomeo as Emily, Rhys Whitfield as Nate, and James Darch as Christian.

On September 30, 2025, a new cast and extension was announced, with the show to run until September 26, 2026, featuring Stevie Doc as Andy, Taila Halford as Emily and Keelan McAuley as Nate. Vanessa Williams and Matt Henry extended their runs as Miranda and Nigel.

In July 2026, the producers announced that Williams and Henry would leave the production in the autumn, with Williams' final performance on September 19 and Henry's on October 17, 2026. Dominic Andersen had by then joined the cast as Christian Thompson.

In August 2026, a further booking extension at the Dominion Theatre was announced, covering February 8 to September 25, 2027. The producers stated that the musical had become the fastest-selling show in the Dominion's history, having sold more than 1.2 million tickets, and that it would reach its 800th performance on September 23, 2026. Henry also decided to stay on until 2027.

In September 2026, Teri Hatcher was announced as the next Miranda Priestly, joining the company on October 20, 2026 for a stint scheduled to run to February 6, 2027. Debbie Kurup plays the role between Williams's departure and Hatcher's arrival.

== Casts ==
Character	Chicago	West End	
Character	2022	2024	2026
Miranda Priestly	Beth Leavel	Vanessa Williams	Vanessa Williams Oct 2026- Terri Hatcher Oct 2026 - Feb 2027
Andy Sachs	Taylor Iman Jones	Georgie Buckland	Stevie Doc
Nigel Owens	Javier Muñoz	Matt Henry	Matt Henry
Emily Charlton	Megan Masako Haley	Amy Di Bartolomeo	Taila Halford
Nate Angstrom	Michael Tacconi	Rhys Whitfield	Keelan McAuley
Christian Thompson	Christian Thompson	James Darch	Dominic Andersen
Standby Miranda	n/a	Debbie Kurup	

Notable Cast Replacements

- Miranda Priestly - Debbie Kurup, Teri Hatcher
- Andy Sachs - Stevie Doc, Jenna Bonner
- Emily Charlton - Taila Halford
- Nate Angstrom - Keelan McAuley, Dean Makowski-Clayton
- Christian Thompson - Dominic Anderson

== Musical numbers ==
London

Act I

- I Mean Business - Andy and Company
- House of Miranda - Miranda and Company
- I Mean Business (Reprise) - Andy
- I Only Love You For Your Body - Andy and Nate
- How to Survive at Runway - Emily
- How to Survive at Runway (Reprise I) - Andy
- Girl for the Job - Andy
- In Or Out (Part 1) - Miranda, Nigel, Andy, Emily, Nate, Christian and Ensemble
- How to Survive at Runway (Reprise II) - Andy
- Dress Your Way Up - Nigel and Company
- In Or Out (Part 2) - Miranda, Nigel, Andy, Emily, Nate, Christian and Ensemble
- How to Survive at Runway (Reprise III) - Andy
- The Devil Wears Prada - Miranda, Nigel and Company
- The Devil Wears Prada (Reprise) - Sung by Company, spoken parts by Miranda and Andy
- Miranda Girl - Andy

Act II

- Entr'Acte
- Bon Voyage - Emily and Hot Nurses
- The Old You - Nate
- City of Dreams - Miranda and Nigel
- Who's She? - Andy and Company
- Seen - Nigel
- House Of Miranda (Reprise) - Miranda
- Your Twenties - Chanteuse
- Bon Voyage (Reprise) - Emily and Hot Nurse
- Stay On Top - Miranda
- Seen (Reprise) - Nigel
- What's Right For Me? - Andy, Miranda, Nate, Emily and Company

== Critical reception ==
The Chicago production officially opened on August 8 and received universally poor reviews. In the New York Post, Johnny Oleksinski said the show was "alarmingly un-fun and sluggish," adding that "every song is lousy, and there is nothing here worth fixing."

The Chicago Tribune's Chris Jones lamented that the show needed "the addition of more wit and irreverence to Wetherhead’s book and Shaina Taub’s lyrics." He also felt that Arianne Phillips' costumes lacked the cutting-edge of true fashion house designs, a critique shared by Steven Oxman of Variety.

Reviewers in The Washington Post, The New York Times, and BroadwayWorld all agreed that the story had its moments, but overall lacked the bite of the novel or film.

For her performance as Emily, Amy Di Bartolomeo received a nomination for the Laurence Olivier Award for Best Actress in a Supporting Role in a Musical.
