= Shaina Taub =

American singer, composer and musician

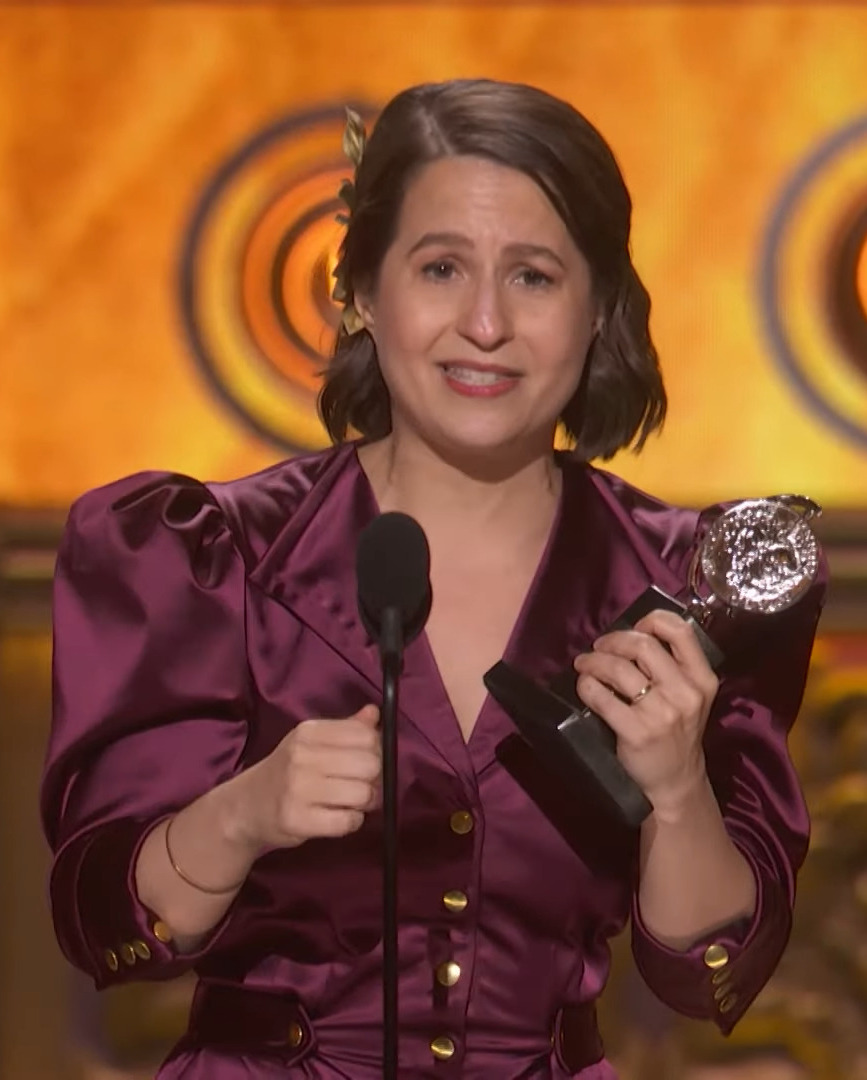
- Taub at the 2024 Tony Awards

Background information
- Born: October 6, 1988 (age 38); Waitsfield, Vermont
- Genres: Pop, cabaret
- Occupations: Musician, actress, singer, composer
- Instruments: Piano, vocals, accordion
- Spouse: Matt Gehring
- Website: shainataub.com
- Taub's 2024 Tony Award acceptance speech

Shaina Taub is an American actress, singer, musician, and Tony Award–winning composer and lyricist.

== Early life ==
Taub was born in Waitsfield, Vermont, and attended the theater camp Stagedoor Manor. Taub's interest in social justice started at a young age. At 16, Taub graduated from Harwood Union High School and went on to attend New York University Tisch School of the Arts where she graduated in 2009.

== Career ==
Taub appeared in “Spare Some Change: NYC Artists for Barack Obama” directed by Ryan Mekenian in 2008 alongside Lindsay Mendez, Carrie Manolakos, Joe Iconis, Seth Rudetsky, and Celia Keenan-Bolger.

Taub composed and starred in three adaptations of Shakespeare plays for The Public Theater's Public Works program: Twelfth Night in both 2016 and 2018 and As You Like It in 2017

Taub has appeared Off-Broadway in the revival of the revue show Old Hats in 2016, Natasha, Pierre and the Great Comet of 1812 as Princess Mary (2013), and in the original Off-Broadway live cast performance of Hadestown as a Fate (2016).

She played the role of Emma Goldman in the Ragtime on Ellis Island concert.

She performed at Joe's Pub in Manhattan monthly during a solo residency.

In 2022, her original musical Suffs, based on suffragists and their American women's suffrage movement, premiered off-Broadway at The Public Theater. Taub wrote the book, music, and lyrics, and also starred as Alice Paul. The show transferred to Broadway in April 2024 to positive reviews. Taub won Tony Awards in 2024 for Best Book and Best Score.

Alongside Elton John on music, Taub penned the lyrics for the 2022 musical adaptation of the 2006 film The Devil Wears Prada, based on Lauren Weisberger's 2003 novel of the same name. It enjoyed a limited run in Chicago in 2022, and a new production opened in London's West End in October 2024.

In November 2024, she reprised the role of Emma Goldman in New York City Center’s Ragtime. In May 2025, it was announced that Taub would play the role again when it transfers to Broadway in September 2025.

Taub was named one of the Time 100 most influential people of 2024.

In June 2026, CBS News included Taub's song "Keep Marching" in its list of the 250 essential American songs of the past 250 years.

== Work ==
Theatre
Year	Title	Role	Notes
2013-2014	Natasha, Pierre & The Great Comet of 1812	Princess Mary	Off-Broadway
2016	Old Hats	Performer	
2016	Hadestown	Fate	Original Cast Off-Broadway
2016	Ragtime	Emma Goldman	Ellis Island Concert
2018	Twelfth Night	Feste	Adapted for Shakespeare in the Park
2022	Suffs	Alice Paul	Off-Broadway; Also composer, lyricist, and created book
2022	As You Like It	Jaques	Adapted for Shakespeare in the Park
2024-2025	Suffs	Alice Paul	Broadway, Music Box Theatre; Also composer, lyricist, and created book
2024-2026	The Devil Wears Prada	—N/a	West End; Lyricist
2024	Ragtime	Emma Goldman	New York City Center
2025-2026	Ragtime	Emma Goldman	Broadway, Vivian Beaumont Theatre

Film
Year	Title	Role	Notes
2021	Tick...Tick...BOOM!	Composer Cameo	

== Discography ==
=== Albums ===
- Visitors (2015)
- Hadestown (2016, Live Original Cast Recording)
- Old Hats (2016)
- Die Happy (2018)
- Twelfth Night (2018, original Public Works cast recording)
- Songs of the Great Hill (2022)
- As You Like It (2022, original Public Works cast recording)
- Suffs (2024, original Broadway cast)
- Ragtime (2026, original Broadway revival cast recording)

=== Singles and EPs ===
- What Otters Do (2011)
- "Given" (2014)
- "Harvest" (2014)
- "Another Winter" (2020)
- "Keep Marching (feat. Broadway Inspirational Voices)" (2024)
- "Huddled Masses" (2026)

== Awards and nominations ==
Year	Award	Category	Work	Result
2014	Lucille Lortel Award	Outstanding Featured Actress in a Musical	Natasha, Pierre & The Great Comet of 1812	Nominated
2019	Drama Desk Awards	MTI Award For Outstanding Music	Twelfth Night	Nominated
2022	Drama Desk Awards	Outstanding Lyrics	Suffs	Nominated
2024	Drama Desk Awards	Outstanding Music	Suffs	Won
2024	Drama Desk Awards	Outstanding Orchestrations	Suffs	Nominated
2024	Outer Critics Circle Awards	Outstanding Book of a Musical (Broadway or Off-Broadway)	Suffs	Won
2024	Outer Critics Circle Awards	Outstanding New Score (Broadway or Off-Broadway)	Suffs	Won
2024	Tony Awards	Best Original Score	Suffs	Won
2024	Tony Awards	Best Book of a Musical	Suffs	Won

- 2014 Jonathan Larson Award recipient
- 2017 Fred Ebb Award recipient
- 2019 Kleban Prize, most promising lyricist award which includes a $100,000 monetary award

== Personal life ==
Taub is Jewish. She is married to Matt Gehring.
