= Debbie Kurup =

English actress

- Born: Debbie Kurup; 3 July 1979 (age 46); Sunderland, England
- Occupations: Actress, singer

Debbie Kurup (born 3 July 1979) is an English actress.

== Acting career ==
Kurup's theatrical credits include: Sweet Charity (Donmar Warehouse), Girl from the North Country (Old Vic - original London cast) and The Threepenny Opera (Royal National Theatre).

In 2015, Kurup played the role of Reno Sweeney in Stage Entertainment's production of Anything Goes (UK/Ireland Tour) for which she received a MTA nomination for Best Actress. Prior to this, she played Nicki Marron in the World Premiere of The Bodyguard at the Adelphi Theatre, London, (2013). Kurup was nominated for an Olivier Award for Best Performance in a Supporting Role in a Musical and Best Supporting Actress in a musical at the Whatsonstage.com Awards of 2013, for her role as Nicki Marron in The Bodyguard and as Best actress in a supporting role in a musical at the BroadwayWorld.comUK awards.

Kurup has also appeared in several theatre productions, including Chicago as Velma Kelly between January and April 2006 at the Adelphi Theatre, and she reprised the same role in 2011 at the Cambridge Theatre. Also, she played DeeDee in Ben Elton's musical, Tonight's The Night at the Victoria Palace, Mimi in Rent UK Tour and in the West End at the Prince of Wales Theatre, Carmen in Fame (musical) for the UK tour, and Consuela/Anita in West Side Story at the Prince of Wales Theatre. In September 2007 she starred in new musical I Love You Because at the Landor Theatre, Clapham, London as Diana Bingley, receiving critical acclaim. She also played the role of KT in Sister Act, at the London Palladium, and was first understudy to leading role Deloris. Kurup appeared as a soloist in the Chess: in Concert company for two nights at the Royal Albert Hall. Kurup played Mrs Neilsen in the 2017 production of Girl from the North Country.

She played Star, one of the personas of American entertainer Cher in the 2022-23 UK tour of The Cher Show.

In 2025, she was a stand-by in the London production of the musical The Devil wears Prada covering the role of Miranda Priestly usually played by Vanessa Williams.

== Recording career ==
Kurup features on the original London cast albums of The Prince of Egypt, Girl from the North Country, Tonight's the Night, Sister Act and Chess in Concert recorded live at the Royal Albert Hall.
