= Amy Di Bartolomeo =

English musical theatre actress

- Born: 1 June 1992 (age 33)
- Years active: 2014–present

Amy Di Bartolomeo (born 1 June 1992) is an English actress. For her performance as Emily in the musical The Devil Wears Prada, she received Laurence Olivier and WhatsOnStage Award nominations.

== Early life ==
Di Bartolomeo was born to an Italian father and an English mother and grew up in Rugeley, Staffordshire, where her parents run an Italian restaurant. At age 11, she started traveling to London for Saturday classes at the Urdang Academy. She trained at Italia Conti Academy of Theatre Arts for a year.

== Career ==
During her time at Italia Conti, Di Bartolomeo signed with an agent, through which she landed her first professional role in the German version of Starlight Express in 2014, covering the roles of Dinah, Ashley and Buffy.

In 2016, she was part of the cast of Priscilla, Queen of the Desert, as cover for several characters as well as Assistant Dance Captain. The show played at the Manchester Opera House and then embarked on a UK tour. She then followed the show to New Zealand, where she played one of the Divas.

In 2021, Di Bartolomeo joined the cast of Six at the Vaudeville Theatre in London, taking over the role of Catherine of Aragon. In 2023, Di Bartolomeo featured in the original cast of Glory Ride at Charing Cross Theatre.

The following year, she starred as Emily in The Devil Wears Prada; the show had its UK premiere at the Theatre Royal, Plymouth before transferring to the Dominion Theatre in the West End. For her performance, Di Bartolomeo was nominated for a WhatsOnStage Award and the Laurence Olivier Award for Best Supporting Actress in a Musical.

== Stage ==
Year	Title	Role	Theatre
2014	Starlight Express	Swing	Starlight Express Theatre, Germany
2016	Priscilla, Queen of the Desert	Swing, Assistant Dance Captain	UK tour
2016	Priscilla, Queen of the Desert	Diva	New Zealand
2017	Bat Out of Hell	Ensemble	London Coliseum
2018	Myth: The Rise and Fall of Orpheus	Tisiphone/Nymph	The Other Palace
2020	We Will Rock You	Oz (Meat)	UK tour
2021–2022	Six	Catherine of Aragon	Vaudeville Theatre, London
2023	Glory Ride	Adriana Bani	Charing Cross Theatre, London
2023	For Tonight concert		Adelphi Theatre, London
2024–2025	The Devil Wears Prada	Emily	Theatre Royal, Plymouth / Dominion Theatre
2024	Alan concert		Cadogan Hall, London
2026	Sea Witch	Annemette	Theatre Royal, Drury Lane

== Awards and nominations ==
Year	Award	Category	Work	Result	Ref.
2025	WhatsOnStage Awards	Best Supporting Performer in a Musical	The Devil Wears Prada	Nominated	
2025	Laurence Olivier Awards	Best Actress in a Supporting Role in a Musical	The Devil Wears Prada	Nominated	
