= Richard David Story =

American magazine editor (1952–2021)

Richard David Story (1952 – 5 March 2021) was an American journalist and magazine editor who was the editor-in-chief of Departures from 2000 to 2017.

== Early life and education ==
Story was born in Oklahoma City and was educated at Northwest Classen High School. He graduated magna cum laude from Williams College in 1974.

== Career ==
After graduating from Williams, Story began his editorial career as a fact checker at Reader's Digest. From 1983 to 1987, he was an entertainment reporter at USA Today. By 1989, he was a senior editor at New York magazine.

In 2000, Story joined Departures and remained its editor-in-chief for 17 years. In 2014, he wrote The World of Departures, a retrospective published with Assouline to mark the magazine's 25th anniversary. After leaving Departures in 2017, he wrote for Town & Country and contributed a travel column to Air Mail.

Story was inducted into the Oklahoma Journalism Hall of Fame in 1989.

== Personal life ==
At Esquire, Story met Jennifer Crandall, who became his wife. They had a son, Zachary. He died in New York City on 5 March 2021, aged 68.

== Bibliography ==
- The World of Departures (2014)
