= Tonight's the Night (2003 musical) =

Musical by Ben Elton, based on the songs of Rod Stewart

- Music: Rod Stewart
- Lyrics: Rod Stewart
- Book: Ben Elton
- Productions: 2003 West End; 2006 UK Tour

Tonight's the Night is a jukebox musical based on the songs of British singer Rod Stewart with a book by Ben Elton. It opened in October 2003 at the Victoria Palace Theatre, and ran for just over a year.

A scaled down version of the musical toured the UK between February and July 2006, commencing at the Palace Theatre, Manchester. It was directed by C. Jay Ranger, with new sets, lighting, sound and costumes.

Reviewing the show in The Guardian, Lyn Gardner noted "What it conveniently forgets is that what makes Stewart distinctive is not the haircut or the obsession with booze, football and blondes, but that exquisite cheesegrater voice with its bluesy catch. However gutsy this cast are, however well they can put a song across, the Rod Stewart musical lacks that one essential ingredient."

== Original creative team ==
- Music and lyrics: Rod Stewart and others
- Book and direction: Ben Elton
- Choreography: Stephen Mear
- Music supervisor/dance arrangements: Gareth Valentine
- Set and costume Design: Lez Brotherston
- Lighting design: Mark Henderson
- Sound design: Rory Madden/Whizz
- Orchestrator: Colin Towns
- Casting: Pippa Ailion
- Producer: Phil McIntyre
- Producer: Arnold Stiefel
- Associates: Paul Roberts, Michael Watt, Michael Coppel

== Original London cast ==
- Stuart Clutterbuck: Tim Howar
- Sweet Lady Mary: Dianne Pilkington
- Satan: Hannah Waddingham
- Baby Jane Golden: Catherine Porter
- Stoner: Michael McKell
- Rocky Washington: Tim Funnell
- Dee Dee: Debbie Kurup
- Jorgė: Howard Samuels
- Greaser: Keith Bookman
- Bonehead: Jeff Edwards
- Winona: Sharon Clancy
- Travolta: Tim Walton
- Bootie: Rebecca Parker
- Loretta: Tanya Robb
- Ensemble: Thern Reynolds, Tyman Boatwright, Matthew Boulton, Daniel Delaney, Lucie Fentum, Matt Firth, Emma Gray, Leon Maurice-Jones, Samantha Modeste, Jo Morris, Brenda Jane Newhouse, Ngo Ngofa, Chris Stanton, Dean Street
- Swings: Lucy Jane Adcock, Jane McMurtrie, Darragh O'Leary, Tino Sanchez, Paul Shipp
- Dance Captain: Sarah Dickens

== 2006 UK tour creative team ==
- Music and lyrics: Rod Stewart and others
- Book: Ben Elton
- Director: C. Jay Ranger
- Choreography: Denise Ranger
- Music supervisor/director: Griff Johnson
- Set design: Andrew Howe-Davies
- Costume design: Shereen Hibbert
- Lighting design: Adam Bassett
- Sound design: Rory Madden/Whizz/Glenn Beckley
- Casting: Pippa Ailion
- Producer: Phil McIntyre
- Producer: Arnola Stiefel
- Associates: Paul Roberts

== 2006 UK tour cast ==
- Stuart Clutterbuck: Ryan Molloy
- Mary: Rachel Tucker
- Satan/Baby Jane Golden: Tiffany Graves
- Stoner: Jeff Edwards
- Rocky: Daniel Robinson
- Dee Dee: Kristina Paraskeva
- Jorgė: Nathaniel Robinson
- Greaser: Stepps
- Understudy Stuart: George Maguire
- Understudy Mary: Rachael Wood
- Ensemble: Jon Hawkins, Ian Male, Sam Attwater, Stephen Uppal, Rebecca Bainbridge, Rachael Wood, Stepps, George Maguire, Francesca Jackson, Faye Raye Robertson, Chloe Bell, Victoria Harrington
- Dance Captain: Stepps
- Resident Director: Stepps

== 2006 UK tour crew ==
- Production manager: Gordon Isaacs
- Company stage manager: Jerry Gunn
- Deputy stage manager: James Hayden
- Assistant stage managers: Leanne Fagan, Martyn Sands
- Chief LX: Nico Bray
- Deputy electrician: Philip Rowe
- Assistant electrician: Vanessa Lucas (was Marsh)
- No 1 sound: Glenn Beckley
- No 2 sound: Aidan Cloney
- No 3 sound: Noel Baum
- Production rigger: Nipper Finch
- Touring carpenter : Dave Edmunds
- Assistant touring carpenter: Jason Culverwell
- Head of wardrobe: Sue Casey
- Wardrobe assistant: Chris Hayward

== 2006 UK tour band ==
- Musical director/Keys 1: Griff Johnson
- Keys 2: Simon Carr-Minns
- Lead guitar: [unknown]
- Rhythm guitar: [unknown]
- Drums: Matt Bayne / Goran Stajic
- Bass guitar: Glen Muscroft
- Transport: Paul Mathew Transport
- Lighting hire: Whitelight Ltd.
- Sound hire: Sonalyst
