= Old Hats =

Performance by David Shiner and Bill Irwin

- Original language: English
- Written by: David Shiner; Bill Irwin
- Genre: Comedy, clown, musical theatre, revue

Premiere
- Date: 2013
- Place: New York City, New York, United States

Old Hats is a 2013 comedy sketch, revue, musical and clown show written and performed by David Shiner and Bill Irwin, the show debuted in New York City. Musician Nellie McKay also performed in the 2013 show.

The original 2013 Off-Broadway was a combination of "clowning revue-with-music". Old Hats won the 2013 Drama Desk Award for Outstanding Revue.

== Revival ==
The show was revived in New York City in 2016 with Shiner and Irwin returning and a new third performer, musician Shaina Taub. In between sketches, Taub performed original songs with a band. The revival was filmed for WNET's Theater Close-up and BroadwayHD.
