= The Devil Wears Prada (novel) =

2003 novel by Lauren Weisberger

- Author: Lauren Weisberger
- Cover artist: Evan Gaffney (design); Nick Dewar (illustration)
- Language: English
- Genre: Chick lit
- Published: February 6, 2003 (Broadway Books)
- Publication place: United States; United Kingdom; France
- Media type: Print (Hardback and Paperback)
- Pages: 360
- ISBN: 0-7679-1476-7
- OCLC: 55053886
- Followed by: Revenge Wears Prada: The Devil Returns

The Devil Wears Prada is a 2003 novel by Lauren Weisberger about a young woman hired as a personal assistant to a powerful fashion magazine editor, a job that becomes nightmarish as she struggles to keep up with her boss's grueling schedule and demeaning demands. It spent six months on New York Times's bestseller list and was adapted for film in 2006 with Meryl Streep, Anne Hathaway, and Emily Blunt in leading roles. The novel is considered by many to be an example of the "chick lit" genre.

Upon its publication The Devil Wears Prada attracted attention because of its author's background. Before writing the novel, Weisberger had worked as a personal assistant to American Vogue editor Anna Wintour, much like the novel's protagonist works for a powerful fashion magazine editor, who also happens to be British like Wintour. Reviewers considered the book a roman à clef, offering insider perspectives on Wintour and other Vogue staff.

A sequel, Revenge Wears Prada: The Devil Returns, was published in 2013, while a third novel, When Life Gives You Lululemons, was published in 2018.

== Plot summary ==
Andrea Sachs, a recent graduate of Brown University with a degree in English, moves to New York City with her best friend, Lily, a graduate student at Columbia. Andrea hopes to find a career in publishing and blankets the city with her résumé. She believes she will be closer to her dream of working for The New Yorker if she can get a job in the magazine industry. She gets a surprise interview at the Elias-Clark Group and is hired as junior assistant for Miranda Priestly, editor-in-chief of the fashion magazine Runway. Although she knows little of the fashion world, everyone tells her that "a million girls would die for [her] job" and that if she manages to work for Miranda for a year, she can have her choice of jobs within the magazine industry.

At a celebrity party, Andrea meets Christian Collinsworth, a charismatic Yale graduate who is considered one of the hot, new up-and-coming writers of their generation. They are attracted to each other, which complicates Andrea's relationship with her boyfriend, Alex.

Andrea's relationships become entangled because of her new job. Lily increasingly turns to alcohol and picks up dubious men to relieve the pressure of graduate school. Alex, struggling with his own demanding job as an inner-city schoolteacher, grows frustrated with Andrea's long hours and constant stress. Andrea's relationship with her family also suffers. Matters finally come to a head when her co-worker, Emily, gets mononucleosis and Andrea must travel to Paris with Miranda in her stead. In Paris, she has a surprise encounter with Christian. Later that night, Miranda finally lets down her guard and asks Andrea what she has learned, and where she wants to work afterwards. She promises to place phone calls to people she knows at the New Yorker on Andrea's behalf once her year is up and suggests she take on some small writing assignments at Runway.

Back at the hotel, Andrea gets urgent calls from Alex and her parents, and learns that Lily is comatose after driving drunk and wrecking a car. Though her family and Alex pressure her to return home, she tells Miranda she will honor her commitment to Runway. Miranda is pleased, and says her future in magazine publishing is bright, but phones with another impossible demand at a Dior fashion show. Andrea decides that her family and friends are more important than her job, and realizes to her horror that she is becoming more and more like Miranda. When she refuses to comply with Miranda's latest outrageous request, Miranda scolds her publicly, to which Andrea replies, "Fuck you, Miranda. Fuck you." She is fired on the spot, and returns home to reconnect with friends and family. She and Alex break up, but remain friends. Lily recovers and is lucky to receive only community service for her DUI charge.

Andrea's dispute with Miranda makes Page Six. Afraid she has been blacklisted from publishing for good, she moves back in with her parents. She works on short fiction and finances her unemployment with profits made from reselling the designer clothing she was provided for her Paris trip. Seventeen buys one of her stories. At the novel's end, she returns to the Elias-Clark building to discuss a position at one of the company's other magazines and sees Miranda's new junior assistant, who looks as harried and put-upon as she once did.

== Characters ==
- Andrea "Andy" Sachs, a recent Brown graduate hired as junior personal assistant to a powerful and tyrannical fashion magazine editor.
- Miranda Priestly, the British-born (as Miriam Princhek) editor-in-chief of Runway, an influential fashion magazine published by the Elias-Clark company. She is known for wearing a white Hermès scarf somewhere on her person every day, and treats her subordinates in a manner that borders on emotional and psychological abuse.
- Emily Charlton, Miranda's former junior assistant, now her senior assistant. She and Andrea have a conflicted relationship.
- Alex Fineman, Andrea's boyfriend, who teaches at an elementary school in the South Bronx through Teach for America.
- Lily Goodwin, a free-spirited graduate student in Russian literature at Columbia with curly black hair. She is Andrea's roommate.
- Nigel, a very tall gay British man who serves as Runway's creative director. He often appears on television as a fashion consultant and is one of the few stars of the magazine Andrea knows before she works there. He is a loud speaker with an outrageous sense of style, and the only person who can get away with critiquing Miranda's personal wardrobe choices.
- James, another gay man at Runway who works at the beauty department. He befriends Andrea, and jokes about "calling in fat" on days when he feels unattractive.
- Jeffy, who oversees Runway's famous "Closet." The Closet is stocked with clothing on loan from fashion designers for use in shoots, but is rarely returned and often "borrowed" by magazine staff. He is responsible for transforming Andrea's wardrobe so she can fit in among the fashionable hallways of Runway offices.
- Hunter Tomlinson, a prominent New York tax attorney who is Miranda's current husband (she is divorced from the father of her two daughters, a well-known British rock star). As nice to Andrea and Emily as his wife is cruel, he is referred to by other close associates of Miranda's as "B-DAD" behind his back, for Blind Deaf and Dumb—the only way they could imagine anyone being able to live with her.
- Eduardo, a security guard at the Elias-Clark building, who playfully makes Andrea or anyone else unfortunate enough to work as one of Miranda's personal assistants sing or put on some sort of act before he lets them enter the building.
- Christian Collinsworth, a handsome young writer whom Andrea meets at a party. They develop a mutual attraction.
- Caroline and Cassidy, the twin daughters Miranda dotes on.
- Cara, the girls' nanny, who saves Andrea's skin more than once but is eventually fired by Miranda after she gives the twins a timeout in their bedroom for a bad attitude.
- Jill, Andrea's older sister, who is married and lives in Houston, where she has begun to affect a Southern accent, much to Andrea's displeasure.
- The Clackers, the magazine's many female editorial staffers, mainly Allison (former senior assistant, now beauty editor), Lucia (fashion department), Jocelyn (editorial), and Stef (accessories). Andrea gives them their nickname for the sound their stiletto heel shoes make on the marble floors of the Elias-Clark building.
- Benjamin, referred to as Benji. He is Lily's ex-boyfriend, but they have stayed in touch despite their breakup. He was involved in the car accident with Lily.

== Conception ==
Weisberger stated in publicity materials that Priestly's demands are partial fiction and a composite of actual experiences she and her friends had in their first jobs. Some reviewers state that Anna Wintour, editor-in-chief of Vogue, was the inspiration for Priestly. After the film was released, another one of Wintour's assistants, Leslie Fremar was identified as the model for Emily. In April 2026, Fremar confirmed that she was the inspiration behind Emily for the first time.

== Commercial and critical reception ==
Kate Betts, a former editor of Harper's Bazaar who also worked for Wintour at one point in her career, objected to the main character's lack of gratitude for the unique opportunity to work at Vogue: "[I]f Andrea doesn't ever realize why she should care about Miranda Priestly, why should we care about Andrea, or prize the text for anything more than the cheap frisson of the context?" Janet Maslin of The New York Times described the novel as "a mean-spirited Gotcha! of a book, one that offers little indication that the author could interestingly sustain a gossip-free narrative." Maslin avoided naming either the magazine where Weisberger had worked or the woman on whom she allegedly modeled her main character, a practice the Times continued when the film was released.

Jennifer Krauss of Newsday agreed that the book had problems but praised it as a "fun, frivolous read".

In 2026, Leslie Fremar, the "real life Emily" spoke out about her experience working with Weisberger, whom she had hired after being promoted to Wintour's first assistant, and shared her side of the story. She pointed to one scene in the novel, not in the film, where Andrea searches frantically for a review of a Chinese restaurant that Miranda had described only as having been "in the Post". Assuming Miranda meant the New York Post, Andrea eventually learns Miranda was referring to the Washington Post. In her experience, that accurately depicted the vague way Wintour communicated. Fremar had to at one point find out herself from other staffers what the Circle Line was when Wintour told her to get tickets for it, as she knew better than to ask Wintour for clarification.

== Film adaptation ==
The film version was released on June 30, 2006 by 20th Century Fox. It was produced by Wendy Finerman (Forrest Gump), freely adapted for the screen by Aline Brosh McKenna and directed by David Frankel. Anne Hathaway plays Andrea Sachs, Emily Blunt plays Miranda's Senior Assistant, Emily, and Meryl Streep earned critical praise, a Golden Globe and an Academy Award for Best Actress nomination as Miranda.

Filming began during fall 2005, on location in New York and Paris. Weisberger herself made a very brief non-speaking cameo appearance as the twins' nanny.

The film was very successful, taking in over $300 million worldwide, making it the highest-grossing film for both Streep and Hathaway to that date. In September, Weisberger and Frankel jointly accepted the first-ever Quill Variety Blockbuster Book to Film Award.

== Sequels ==
Revenge Wears Prada: The Devil Returns, the book's sequel, is set a decade after the events of the first novel. In it, Andy is the editor for a new bridal magazine, but as she plans her own wedding she remains haunted by her experience with Miranda until the two meet again.

The Associated Press stated, "The book successfully sprinkles pop culture tidbits to keep up the breezy tone...for this summer, it's a pleasant, entertaining read in a tabloid magazine sort of way." Departures said, "Miranda Priestly returns, more delightfully terrifying than ever, in this delicious sequel to The Devil Wears Prada." The Richmond Times-Dispatch called it "an excellent page turner for summer vacation." BookReporter wrote, "The reader is pulled into the glitz and glamour reminiscent of the New York Times bestseller The Devil Wears Prada and the movie adaptation." The Washington Post said, "Miranda is pretty much the only thing that makes this book interesting." MSN.com called the story "disconcerting".

A third novel, When Life Gives You Lululemons, was published in 2018.

== Musical ==
In 2015, it was reported that Broadway producer Kevin McCollum (Rent, Avenue Q amongst others) had signed a deal two years earlier with Fox to develop some of the films from its back catalog into musicals for the stage. He expressed particular interest in Mrs. Doubtfire and The Devil Wears Prada. Early in 2017, it was officially announced by McCollum that in partnership with Fox Stage Productions and Rocket Entertainment, a musical version of The Devil Wears Prada (influenced by both the film and the book) would be produced. Sir Elton John (who also wrote the scores for Billy Elliot and The Lion King amongst others) was announced as the composer for the project and Paul Rudnick (most notable for writing the film Sister Act) would write the lyrics and story. The casting and production schedule is still to be announced but it is aimed to play on Broadway.

The musical opened in Chicago in July 2022 for a four-week tryout before a planned move to New York. Beth Leavel portrays Miranda and Taylor Iman Jones plays Andy. Paul Rudnick withdrew from the project prior to the opening.

=== London (2024) ===
On 13 September 2023, it was announced that the musical will have its UK premiere at the Theatre Royal, Plymouth in July 2024 before a scheduled opening at the Dominion Theatre in London's West End in October 2024. It will be a new production directed and choreographed by Jerry Mitchell with set design by Tim Hatley, costume design by Gregg Barnes, lighting design by Bruno Poet, sound design by Gareth Owen and casting by Jill Green CDG.

In February 2024, Vanessa Williams was announced as Miranda Priestly, with British actor Matt Henry joining her as Nigel. Full casting was announced in June 2024. Joining Williams and Henry are Georgie Buckland as Andy, Amy Di Bartolomeo as Emily, Rhys Whitfield as Nate, and James Darch as Christian.

The West End production played its first preview performance at the Theatre Royal Plymouth on 7 July 2024.
