= Linda Yellin =

American novelist

- Born: Chicago, Illinois, U.S.
- Occupation: Author
- Writing career
- Genres: Fiction; Memoir; Humor
- Website: www.lindayellin.com

Linda Yellin is an American memoirist, novelist, and humorist.

== Early life ==
Born Melinda Jacobson in Chicago, Illinois, at 15 she was adopted by her stepfather and changed her name to Linda Yellin. Her family moved to Wilmette, Illinois, where she attended New Trier High School and was head writer of New Trier's annual Lagniappe review. She received a BS from the University of Illinois at Champaign-Urbana.

== Early career ==
Yellin was a copywriter and creative director in the advertising industry, working for such companies as Needham, Harper & Stears (now DDB), J. Walter Thompson (now JWT), Foote, Cone and Belding (now DraftFCB) and Ogilvy and Mather (now Ogilvy) and Young and Rubicam (now Y&R.)

== Writing ==
Yellin has published three books: a memoir entitled The Last Blind Date, published in October, 2011 by Gallery Books of Simon & Schuster, and two novels, Such A Lovely Couple and What Nora Knew, also published by Simon & Schuster, an homage to romantic movies and to the late screenwriter Nora Ephron. She is also a frequent contributor to national magazines, including contributing short stories to Redbook magazine and humor pieces for More magazine.

== Personal life ==
Yellin met her first husband, Rick Cadwell, a former member of the United States Marine Corps and Vietnam War veteran, while an undergraduate at the University of Illinois. Yellin's first novel, Such a Lovely Couple, was based on their relationship and Cadwell's death from a brain tumor. In 1996 Yellin married financial adviser Randy Arthur and moved to New York. Her memoir, "The Last Blind Date," was based on their courtship.
