= Taylor Iman Jones =

American musical-theatre actress

- Born: March 6, 1992 (age 34); San Francisco Bay Area, California, U.S.
- Occupations: Actress; singer
- Website: taylorimanjones.com

Taylor Iman Jones (Born March 6, 1992) is an American actress and singer known for her work in musical theatre.

== Early life ==
Born in the San Francisco Bay Area of California, Jones moved several times growing up, from Tennessee to Texas. Jones performed in her first musical at age 11, and later began her career in several productions in the Bay Area.

== Career ==
Jones career began on the U.S. national tours of American Idiot from 2013-2014 as Extraordinary Girl, and Hamilton as Peggy Schuyler/Maria Reynolds in 2016. In 2017, Jones moved to New York City and made her Broadway debut in the ensemble of Groundhog Day. The following year, she originated the role of Mopsa in Head Over Heels on Broadway. She returned to Broadway in 2022 in Six as Catherine Parr.

Jones has also performed Off-Broadway as Pat in Scotland, PA and Princess in Emojiland. She returned to her previous role in Hamilton in 2021 for its Los Angeles run. She also appeared in the Chicago pre-Broadway tryout of the musical adaptation of The Devil Wears Prada as Andy Sachs, originally portrayed in the film by Anne Hathaway. She continued to appear Off-Broadway in 2024 in The Lonely Few at MCC Theater as Amy, Empire Records at the McCarter Theater as Max and Two Gentlemen of Verona at Symphony Space as Silvia.

In 2025, she starred as Meg Murry in the pre-Broadway musical adaptation of A Wrinkle in Time in Washington, D.C. at Arena Stage, directed by Lee Sunday Evans and starring alongside Amber Gray.

== Theatre credits ==
| Year | Title | Role | Notes | Ref. |
|---|---|---|---|---|
| 2013–2014 | American Idiot | Extraordinary Girl | U.S. National Tour | |
| 2016 | Hamilton | Peggy Schuyler/Maria Reynolds | U.S. National Tour | |
| 2017 | Groundhog Day | Lady Storm Chaser/Nancy/Rita Hanson | Broadway | |
| 2018–2019 | Head Over Heels | Mopsa | Broadway | |
| 2019 | Scotland, PA | Pat McBeth | Off-Broadway | |
| 2020 | Emojiland | Princess | Off-Broadway | |
| 2021 | Hamilton | Peggy Schuyler/Maria Reynolds | Los Angeles | |
| 2022 | The Devil Wears Prada | Andy Sachs | Chicago Pre-Broadway Tryout | |
| 2022 | Six | Catherine Parr | Broadway | |
| 2024 | The Lonely Few | Amy | MCC Theater | |
| 2024 | Empire Records | Max | McCarter Theater | |
| 2024 | Two Gentlemen of Verona | Silvia | Symphony Space | |
| 2025 | Jonathan Larson Project | Performer | Orpheum Theatre (Manhattan) | |
| 2025 | A Wrinkle in Time | Meg Murry | Arena Stage | |
