= Stephanie Klein =

American blogger

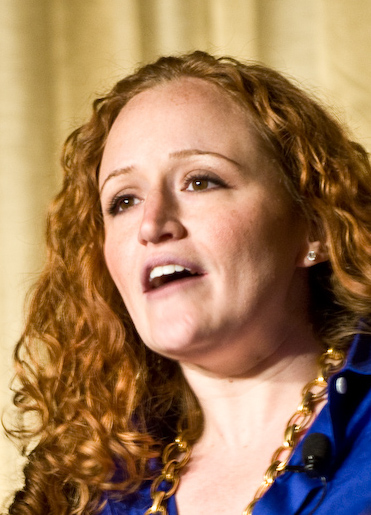
- Born: September 29, 1975 (age 50); New York, U.S.
- Education: Barnard College (BA)
- Occupations: Weight loss strategist and consultant; blogger; author
- Website: stephanieklein.com

Stephanie Klein (born September 29, 1975) is an American weight loss strategist and consultant, blogger and the author of Straight Up and Dirty: A Memoir and Moose: A Memoir of Fat Camp.

== Biography ==
Born in New York on September 29, 1975, Klein graduated magna cum laude from Barnard College, in 1997 with a B.A. in English and a concentration in writing.

Klein first gained popularity through her blog, Greek Tragedy, which was originally created as a showcase for her advertising portfolio. In 2004, The Independent in London discovered her blog and dubbed her "The Internet Queen of Manhattan." In 2005, she was featured on the front cover of The New York Times Sunday Styles section, where it was reported that Greek Tragedy was in the top 1% of all blogs. By 2008, she was named one of the world's 50 most powerful blogs by The Guardian.

Klein signed a two-book deal with Judith Regan (now known as HarperCollins). "Straight Up and Dirty: A Memoir" was published in 2006, and "Moose: A Memoir of Fat Camp" was published in 2008. "Straight Up and Dirty", like her blog, focuses on her life after her divorce, while Moose focuses on her life when she was an overweight child. Both best selling memoirs were highly received by the press such as Entertainment Weekly, People Magazine, USA Today, New York Times.

She currently lives with her husband and twins, Abigail and Lucas, on Long Island.
