= Dominion Theatre =

West End theatre in London

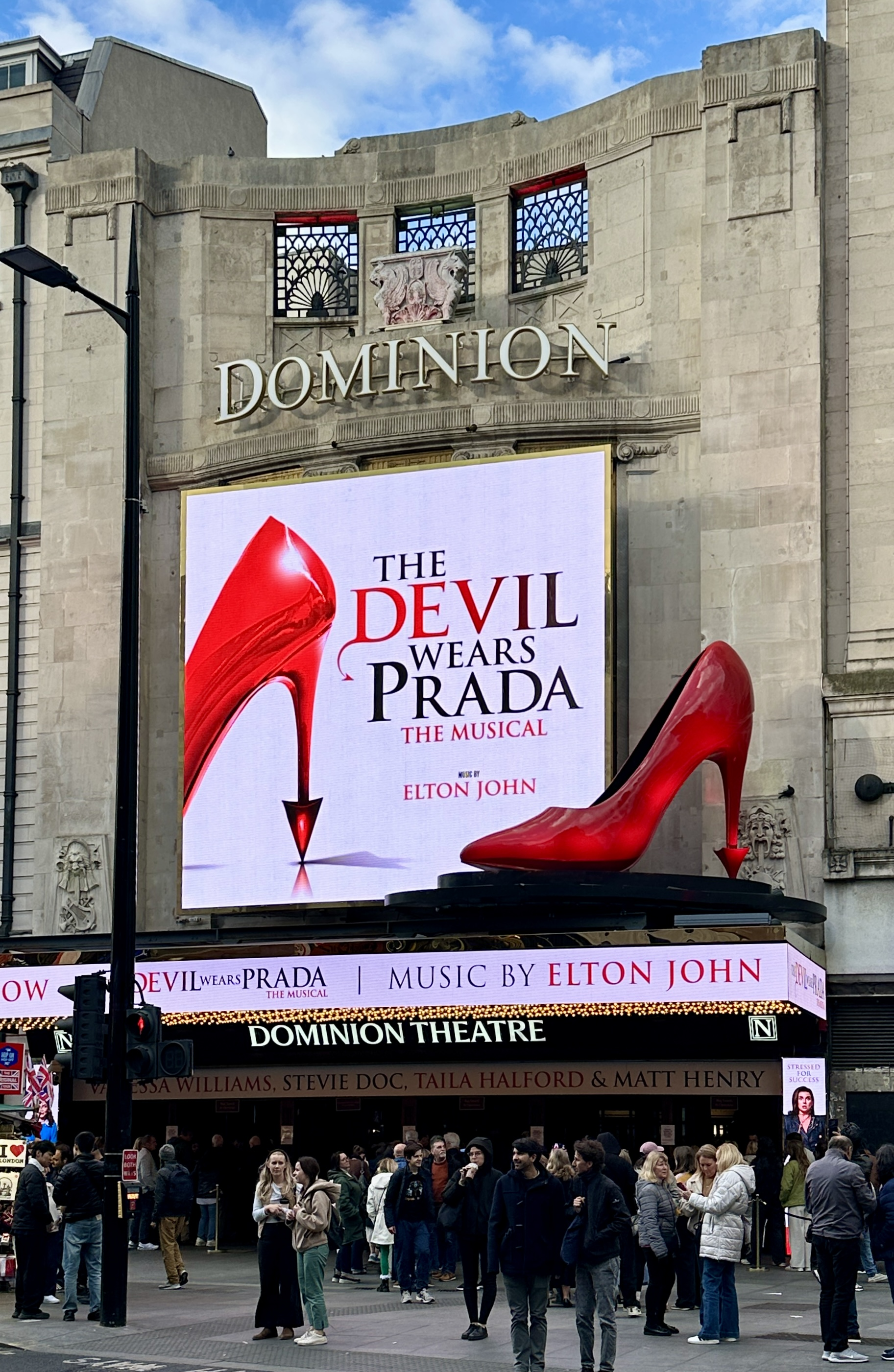
- Dominion Theatre in 2026 advertising The Devil Wears Prada
- Interactive map of Dominion Theatre
- Address: 268–269 Tottenham Court Road; London, United Kingdom
- Coordinates: 51.516556°N 0.130139°W
- Owner: Nederlander Organization
- Capacity: 2,163 on 2 levels 2,074 (for WWRY)
- Type: West End theatre
- Designation: Grade II listed
- Production: The Devil Wears Prada
- Public transit: Tottenham Court Road

Construction
- Opened: 3 October 1929; 96 years ago
- Architects: W & TR Milburn

Tenants
- Hillsong Church (Sundays, 2005-present)

Website
- www.nederlander.co.uk/dominion-theatre

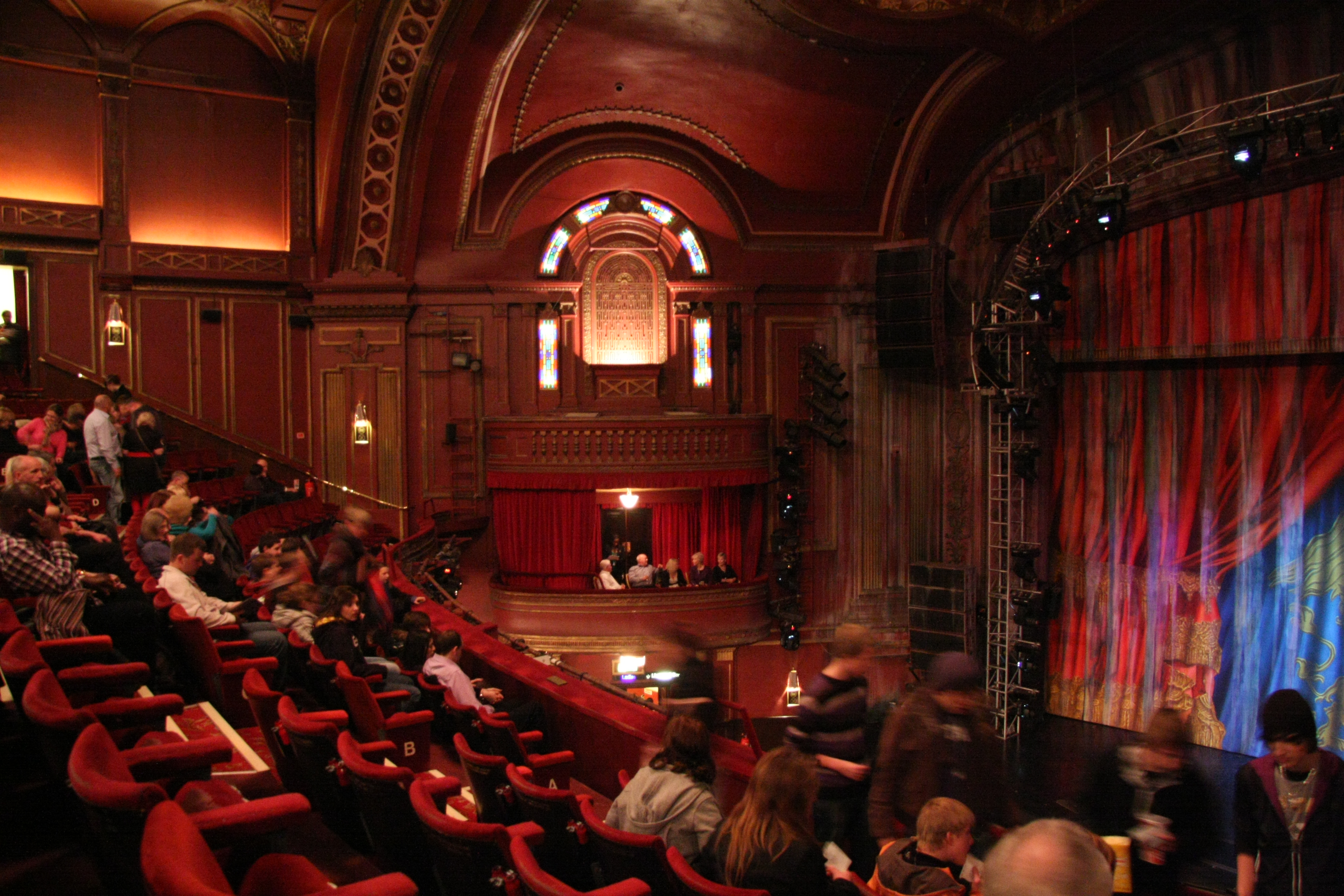
Interior of the theatre in 2010, stage to the right

The Dominion Theatre is a West End theatre and former cinema on Tottenham Court Road, close to St Giles Circus and Centre Point, in the London Borough of Camden. Planned as primarily a musical theatre, it opened in 1929, but the following year became a cinema—it hosted the London premiere of Charlie Chaplin's City Lights with Chaplin in attendance—and in 1933 after liquidation of the controlling company was sold to Gaumont cinema chain, which later became part of the Rank Organisation. It was a major premiere cinema until the 1970s, when it began to host live concerts.

In January 1981 it once more became primarily a live performance venue, and has since hosted many musicals, notably We Will Rock You which ran from 2002 to 2014. It also hosted the Royal Variety Performance seven times in the 1990s and early 2000s. It became a listed building in 1988 and after being saved from redevelopment, was sold to Apollo Leisure Group and subsequently to the Nederlander Organization. In the 21st century it has been extensively refurbished and renovated, including reclaiming spaces that had been turned into offices.

On Sundays Hillsong Church London holds services in the theatre.

== Building ==
Construction of the Dominion Theatre began in March 1928 with a design by W and TR Milburn and a budget of £460,000. The site was the location of the 1911 Court Cinema and the 1746 Horse Shoe Brewery, established in 1746. The Horse Street Brewery was the site of the 1814 London Beer Flood. The first performance was on 3 October 1929. The theatre is Renaissance revival in style; the Tottenham Court Road façade features a ground level entry sheltered by a broad marquee with the second through fourth levels framed by large pilasters. The central portion is concave and faced with Portland stone. A three-bay bow window extends the height of the second and third storeys and is surmounted by a sculpture of two gryphons, behind which are three square openings with decorative iron grates.

The theatre was intended primarily for musical comedies and secondarily as a cinema. It originally had a seating capacity of 2,835: 1,340 in the stalls, 818 in the dress circle and 677 in the balcony (upper circle). The balcony was closed in the 1950s; as of 2021, capacity is 2,069 in two tiers of galleries. The theatre retains its 1920s light fittings and art deco plasterwork. A café was originally above the entrance.

== History ==
The first production at the Dominion was the Broadway musical Follow Through, which closed after 148 performances. The first film was the British premiere of 1925's The Phantom of the Opera with added sound, on 21 July 1930, which was attended by H. G. Wells. Associated British Cinemas took over the theatre in October 1930 and subsequently leased it to United Artists, and in February 1931 it hosted the London premiere of Charlie Chaplin's City Lights, with Chaplin himself attending and speaking from the stage, but a financial slide led to liquidation of the company on 30 May 1932.

The Dominion had already been somewhat adapted to cinema use, with removal of cloakrooms and bars. In January 1933 it was sold to Gaumont-British Picture Corporation, which in 1940 was acquired by Rank. Gaumont installed a three-manual, 12-rank Compton organ; Frederic Bayco, principal organist for Gaumont, was organist in residence and other organists who played there included Felton Rapley and William Davies. During the Second World War, the building was damaged in the Blitz; it reopened in 1941, but the organ was not restored until October 1945, when Jackie Brown became resident organist. John Logie Baird made the first demonstration of his system for transmitting live television to cinemas over a landline at the Dominion in 1937, and in December that year began regular large-screen colour transmissions that formed part of the Dominion's variety shows.

After the war, the carpenter's shop, the upper floors of dressing rooms and the café were converted to office space. Live shows recommenced in the late 1950s: Bill Haley and the Comets opened their UK tour there in February 1957, and The Judy Garland Show ran for a month in late 1957. But it remained primarily a cinema. It closed in February 1958 for the installation of a Todd-AO system with two Philips 70 mm / 35 mm projectors and a 45 feet (14 m) wide screen; at this time the upper circle was closed and also became offices. The film version of Rodgers and Hammerstein's South Pacific opened on 21 April 1958 and played for four years and 22 weeks, grossing $3.9 million. In 1963, Elizabeth Taylor appeared at the European opening of Cleopatra, which played for almost two years. From 29 March 1965 to 29 June 1968, The Sound of Music was screened at the Dominion, the longest run of screenings of the film at any venue in the world. George Lucas' Star Wars had its UK premiere jointly at the Dominion and the then Leicester Square Theatre in 1977, and its sequels The Empire Strikes Back and Return of the Jedi also premiered at the Dominion.

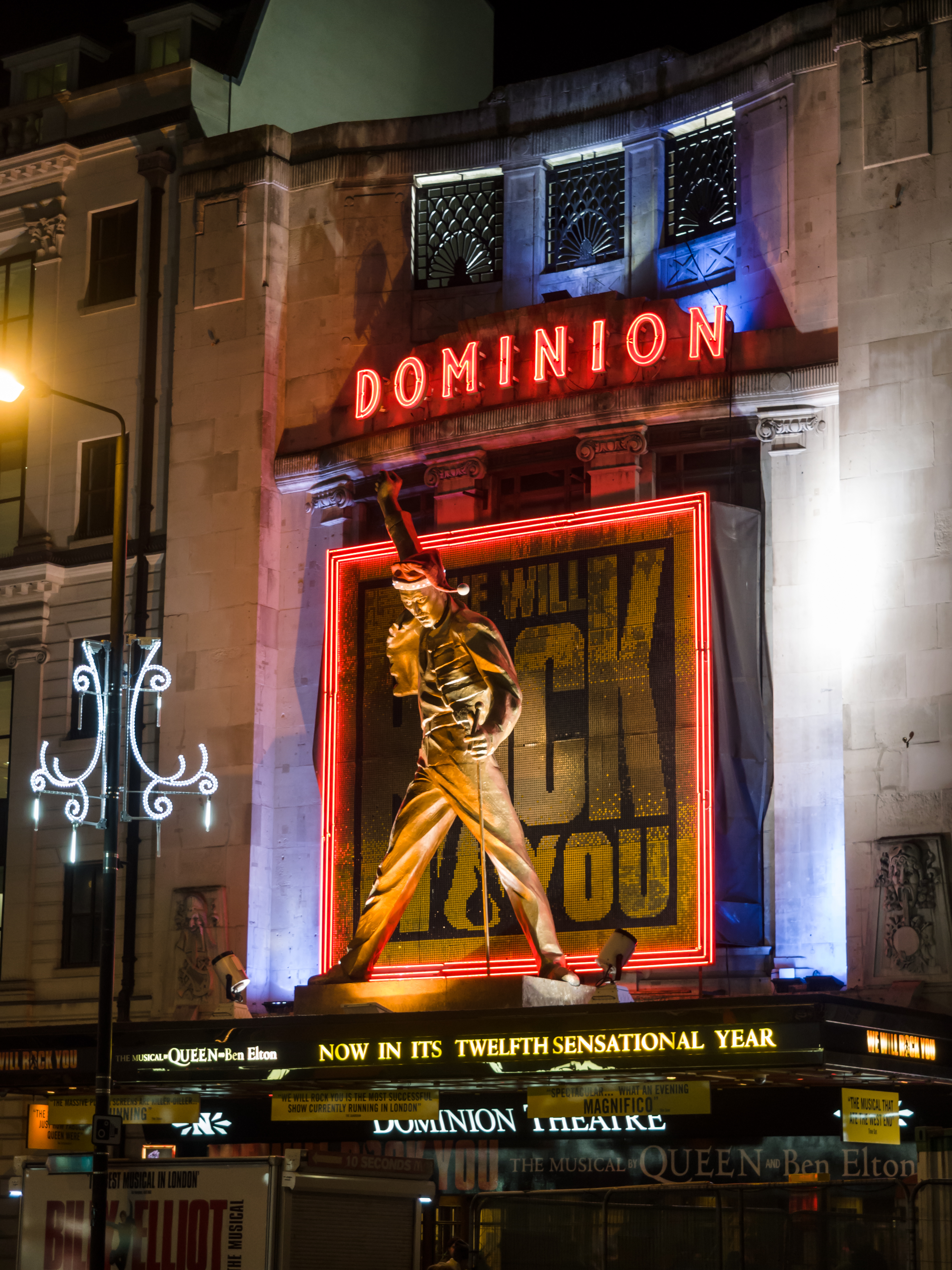
Statue of Freddie Mercury on the theatre façade during the 12-year run of We Will Rock You

In the 1970s, the Dominion returned to hosting concerts; since 8 November 1981 it has been primarily used for live performances. It was where Tangerine Dream recorded the album Logos in 1982, which contains a tribute tune called "Dominion". Dolly Parton filmed her 1983 concert at the Dominion and released it as a television special, Dolly in London. Other performers to appear during this era included Duran Duran, Adam and The Ants, Billy Bragg, Bon Jovi, The Boomtown Rats, Boy George, David Bowie, Ian Drury and the Blockheads, Manfred Mann, Ricky Skaggs, Sinead O'Connor, The Stranglers, Thin Lizzy, U2 and Van Morrison. In 1986, the interior was painted black for the musical Time, which ran for two years. After a legal dispute, Rank sold the theatre to developers who sought to demolish it; in 1988 it became a Grade II listed building, and following protests, a public enquiry halted the demolition in 1990. Rank leased the theatre back from the developers and then sold it to Paul Gregg's Apollo Leisure Group; in 1992 it was acquired by the New York-based Nederlander Organization, with Apollo Leisure retaining a financial interest and operating the theatre on behalf of Nederlander Dominion Ltd.

Since the early 1990s the Dominion has hosted several musicals including a new production of Grease by David Ian and Paul Nicholas, Scrooge: The Musical, Matthew Bourne's Swan Lake, Disney's Beauty and the Beast, a return of Grease, and Notre Dame de Paris. The Dominion also hosted the Royal Variety Performance from 1992 through 1996 and in 2000 and 2001.

The stage musical We Will Rock You, based on the songs of Queen and created by guitarist Brian May and drummer Roger Taylor together with British comedian Ben Elton, opened at the Dominion on 14 May 2002. Scheduled to close in October 2006 before embarking on a UK tour, it was extended indefinitely by popular demand and ultimately ran for 12 years, closing on 31 May 2014. To celebrate the tenth anniversary of the production, in 2012 the theatre converted an area previously devoted to Judy Garland memorabilia into the Freddie Mercury Suite, which displays pictures from the Queen singer's lifetime.

In 1999, SFX Entertainment acquired Apollo Leisure and in 2001 Clear Channel Entertainment, part of the US-based multinational, purchased SFX. Clear Channel spun-off its venues as Live Nation UK, who operated them on behalf of Nederlander. On 23 October 2009 the Nederlander Organization took full control of the Dominion, buying out Live Nation.

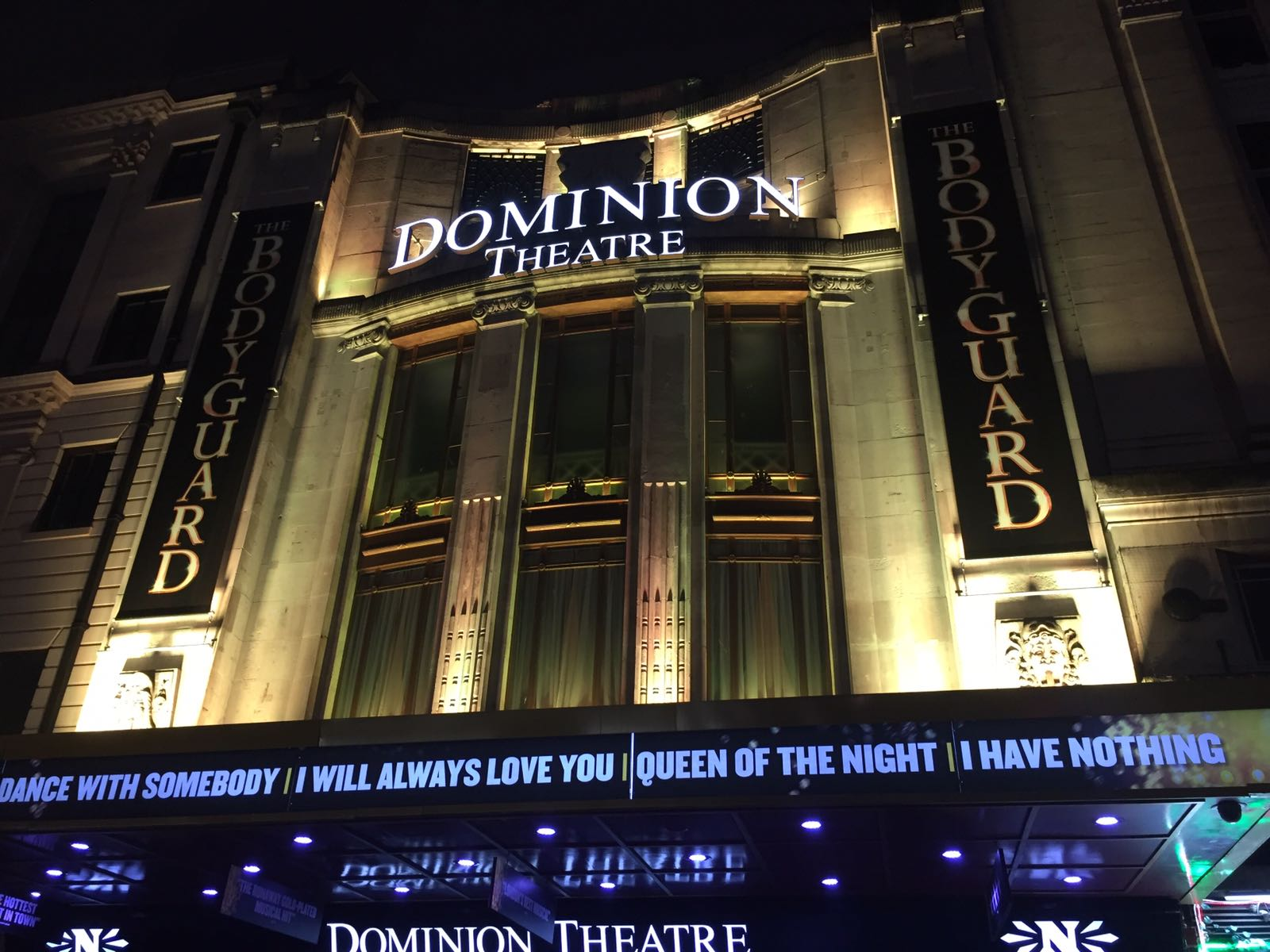
The restored façade illuminated at night

An extensive programme of refurbishment and restoration of the theatre was begun in the 21st century. In 2008 the area above the main foyer was reclaimed as 'The Studio', a rehearsal and audition space. In 2011 the original link to the building on Great Russell Street now known as Nederlander House was restored, providing theatre management offices and creating boardroom or conference space on the top floor where the 1929 plans had indicated a boardroom. In 2014, during a 15-week closure after the end of We Will Rock You, both the interior and the exterior were extensively refurbished, including restoring architectural features on the Tottenham Court Road façade, such as the gryphons, which are believed to have been removed in 1932, cleaning and replacing stonework and windows at the rear and updating much of the backstage facilities, including the flying system. In 2017, renovations were completed with the unveiling of a new double-sided LED screen, the largest and highest-resolution projecting screen on the exterior of a West End theatre.

Since re-opening on 16 September 2014 for the completion of renovations, the Dominion Theatre has been home to a number of short run musicals and spectaculars, including Evita (September 2014) and the London premiere of Elf (October 2015). From February to April 2016, it hosted a "re-imagined" production of Jeff Wayne's musical version of The War of the Worlds. From March 2017 to January 2018, it housed An American in Paris.

In addition to hosting musicals in recent years, the theatre was home to the London auditions of Britain's Got Talent and has hosted a number of regular charity events, including MADTrust's West End Eurovision (2012, 2013, 2014) and West End Heroes (2013, 2014, 2015), which brought together stars from current West End Shows, with musicians, from all the armed forces. The second event, in 2014, was hosted by Michael Ball.

The organ was separated from its console and for some years was in a church in Llanelli. It was purchased by a collector in 2002 and is to form part of the collection of The Music Palace, a museum of cinema organs in Porth.

== Recent productions ==
- Tangerine Dream Logos 1982
- Duran Duran's charity concert at Villa Park 1983
- Time (9 April 1986 – 1988)
- Jackie Mason: Brand New! (22 March 1993 – 24 March 1993) by Jackie Mason
- Grease (15 July 1993 – 19 October 1996), (22 October 2001 – 3 November 2001), (10 May 2022 – 29 October 2022), & (2 June – 28 October 2023) by Jim Jacobs and Warren Casey
- Scrooge (12 November 1996 – 1 February 1997) by Leslie Bricusse
- Disney's Beauty and the Beast (13 May 1997 – 11 December 1999) by Howard Ashman, Alan Menken, Tim Rice and Linda Woolverton
- Matthew Bourne's Swan Lake (7 February 2000 – 11 March 2000) by Matthew Bourne
- Tango Passion (21 March 2000 – 23 March 2000) by Hector Zaraspe
- Notre-Dame de Paris (23 May 2000 – 6 October 2001) by Richard Cocciante and Luc Plamondon
- We Will Rock You (14 May 2002 – 31 May 2014) by Queen and Ben Elton
- Evita (22 September 2014 – 1 November 2014) by Andrew Lloyd Webber
- Irving Berlin's White Christmas (8 November 2014 – 3 January 2015) by Irving Berlin
- Frozen Sing-Along (18 February 2015 – 28 February 2015) by Disney and Christophe Beck
- Lord of the Dance: Dangerous Games (15 March 2015 – 5 September 2015) by Michael Flatley
- Elf the Musical (5 November 2015 – 2 January 2016), (14 November 2022 – 7 January 2023) & (15 November 2023 – 6 January 2024) by Matthew Sklar and Chad Beguelin
- The War of the Worlds (February 2016 – April 2016) by Jeff Wayne
- The Bodyguard (15 July 2016 – 7 January 2017)
- An American in Paris (21 March 2017 – 6 January 2018) by George Gershwin, Ira Gershwin and Craig Lucas
- Shen Yun (16 February 2018 – 25 February 2018)
- Bat Out of Hell The Musical (2 April 2018 – 5 January 2019) by Jim Steinman
- Big: The Musical (from 10 September 2019 for 9 weeks)
- Irving Berlin's White Christmas (15 November 2019 – 4 January 2020) by Irving Berlin
- The Prince of Egypt (5 February 2020 – 8 January 2022) by Stephen Schwartz and Philip LaZebnik
- Dirty Dancing (21 January – 29 April 2023)
- The King and I (20 January – 2 March 2024) by Rodgers and Hammerstein
- Sister Act (15 March – 31 August 2024), by Alan Menken, Glenn Slater, Bill and Cheri Steinkellner, Douglas Carter Beane
- The Devil Wears Prada (from October 2024) by Elton John, Shaina Taub and Kate Wetherhead

== Hillsong Church London ==
Since January 2005, Hillsong Church London have held their Sunday services at the Dominion Theatre.
