= Lauren Weisberger =

American author (born 1977)

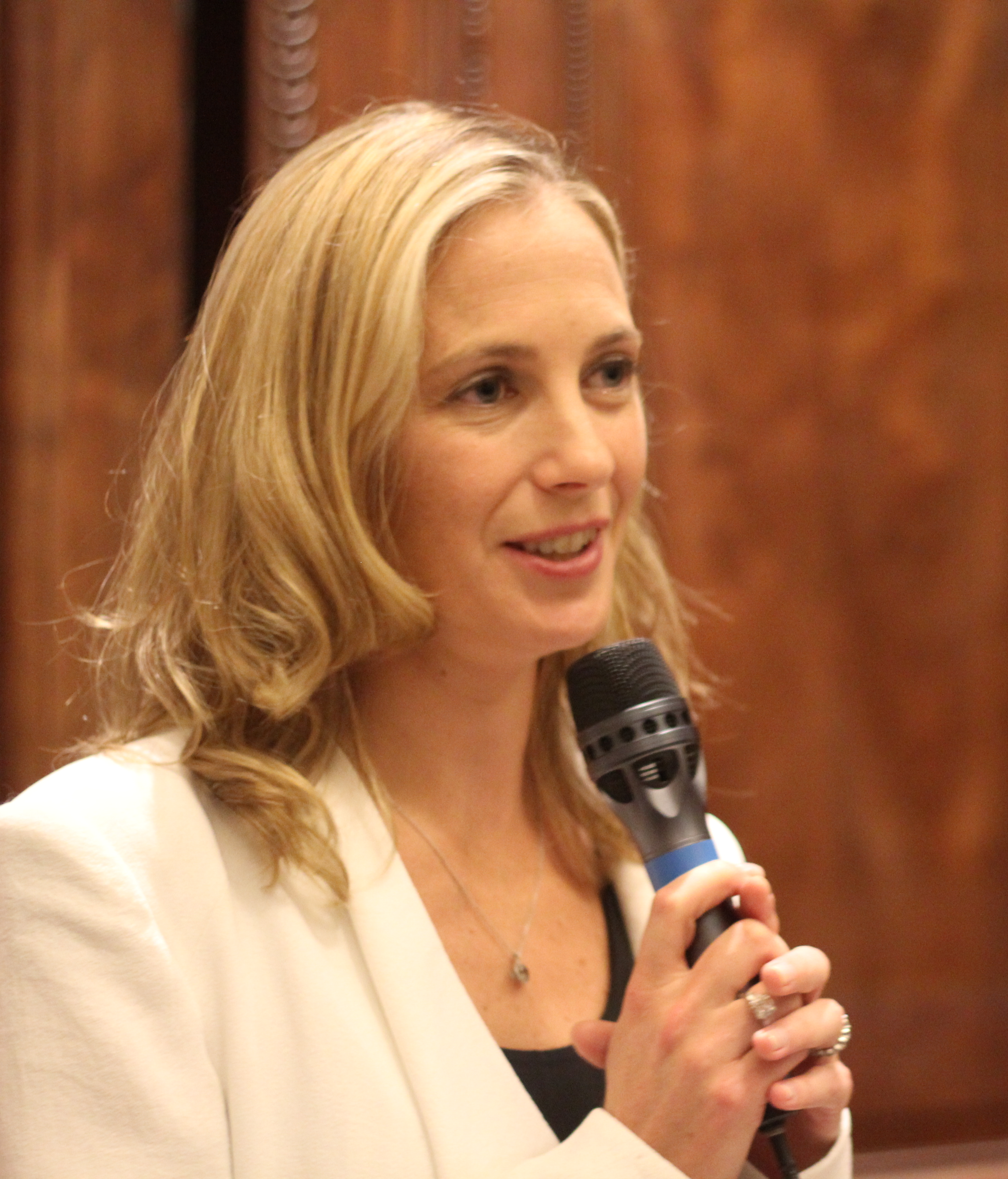
- Weisberger in 2013
- Born: March 28, 1977 (age 49); Scranton, Pennsylvania, U.S.
- Education: Cornell University (BA)
- Occupation: Author
- Spouse: Mike Cohen (m. 2008)
- Children: 2
- Writing career
- Period: 2003–present
- Genre: Fiction
- Notable work: The Devil Wears Prada
- Website: laurenweisberger.com

Lauren Weisberger (born March 28, 1977) is an American writer. She is author of the 2003 bestseller The Devil Wears Prada, a roman à clef of her experience as an assistant to Vogue editor-in-chief Anna Wintour. Weisberger worked as a writer and editor for Vogue and Departures magazines prior to writing The Devil Wears Prada, which was adapted into a film of the same name in 2006. She has since published seven other novels.

== Early life and education ==
Weisberger was born in Scranton, Pennsylvania to a school teacher mother and a department store president turned mortgage broker father. Her family is Jewish, and she was raised in Conservative Judaism and later Reform Judaism. She spent her early youth in Clarks Summit, Pennsylvania, a small town outside Scranton. At age 11, her parents divorced and she and her younger sister moved to Allentown, Pennsylvania in the Lehigh Valley region of the state, with their mother.

She attended Parkland High School in South Whitehall Township near Allentown, where she was involved in intramural sports, some competitive sports, extra projects and organizations. She graduated from Parkland High School in 1995 and attended Cornell University in Ithaca, New York, where she was an English major, a sorority member of Alpha Epsilon Phi and graduated in 1999.

After graduating from Cornell University, Weisberger backpacked through much of Europe, the Middle East and Asia, including Egypt, Hong Kong, India, Israel, Jordan, Nepal and Thailand.

== Career ==
=== Vogue magazine ===
After returning to the United States following her travel expedition, Weisberger settled in Manhattan, where she was hired as assistant to Vogue editor Anna Wintour. After ten months, she and Vogue features editor Richard Story left the magazine. Weisberger said she felt out of place at the magazine, although Vogue managing editor Laurie Jones later said, "She seemed to be a perfectly happy, lovely woman".

=== Departures magazine ===
Weisberger and Story began working for Departures, an American Express publication, where she wrote 100-word reviews and became an assistant editor. She also published a 2004 article in Playboy magazine.

After mentioning her interest in writing classes to Story, he referred her to his friend Charles Salzberg. She started writing a story about her time at Vogue, and completed it by trying to write 15 pages every few weeks. After repeated urgings, she showed the finished work to agents and it sold within two weeks.

=== The Devil Wears Prada ===
Weisberger's first book, The Devil Wears Prada, was published by Broadway Books in 2003; it spent six months on The New York Times Best Seller List. By July 2006, The Devil Wears Prada was the best-selling mass-market softcover book in the nation, according to Publishers Weekly.

The Devil Wears Prada is a semi-fictional but highly critical book on the Manhattan elite, and is largely based on Weisberger's experience at Vogue magazine. The book's primary character Miranda Priestly is believed to represent Wintour and the fictional Elias-Clark publishing company in the book is believed to be modeled on Condé Nast. The book focuses on many comical aspects of a first job in the world of elite fashion.

While commercially successful, the book was not well received at Vogue. Kate Betts, a Vogue editor, criticized Weisberger and the book in The New York Times, writing that Weisberger and Wintour are actually the direct counterparts of their fictional characters. "Andrea is just as much a snob as the snobs she is thrown in with," Betts wrote in April 2003.

==== Film ====
Film rights to The Devil Wears Prada were acquired by 20th Century Fox, which released a movie of the same name in June 2006, starring Meryl Streep (as Miranda Priestly) and Anne Hathaway (as Andrea Sachs). The film grossed $27.5 million in its opening weekend, and amassed U.S. sales of nearly $125 million and worldwide sales of $326 million, making it one of the top-grossing films of summer 2006.

Weisberger made a brief cameo in the film as the twins' nanny.

==== Television ====
In October 2006, Fox acquired the television rights to the book, although the series was ultimately never developed.

=== Everyone Worth Knowing ===
Weisberger secured a $1 million advance from Simon & Schuster for her second novel, Everyone Worth Knowing, which was based on the trials and tribulations of the New York City public relations world. The book was published in fall 2005 and received generally unfavorable reviews. The New York Times Book Review described it as "fatuous, clunky." USA Today called it "lackluster imitation" and Entertainment Weekly said it was a "ho-hum rehash" of The Devil Wears Prada. It debuted on The New York Times Best Sellers List at No. 10 but dropped off the list in two weeks and was ultimately noted for disappointing sales. The audio book was read by actress Eliza Dushku. In some European countries, the novel was released under the separate title Gossip and Gucci.

=== Chasing Harry Winston ===
Chasing Harry Winston, Weisberger's third novel, was released May 27, 2008 and on May 19, 2008 in the United Kingdom. The book follows three best friends in New York City—Emmy, Adriana, and Leigh—as they confront their anxieties about turning 30. Recently dumped Emmy promises to make a drastic change and find guys from every continent for casual affairs. Beautiful Brazilian Adriana tries to leave her old lifestyle of sleeping around and living off her father to get a Harry Winston ring on her finger before her first wrinkles begin showing. Leigh, the one with the perfect life, does not know what she needs in order to be happy and relax.

In September 2008, Universal Pictures secured rights to the book, and it was translated into French, Dutch, and Italian. In some European countries, the novel was released under the separate title Chanel Chic. In Italy, the title is Un anello da Tiffany & Co (A ring from Tiffany & Co). In France, the title is Sexe, diamants et plus si affinités (Sex, Diamonds, and maybe more...)

The book was panned by critics and was voted "#1 Worst Book of 2008" by Entertainment Weekly.

=== Last Night at Chateau Marmont ===
Last Night at Chateau Marmont was released in August 2010. It debuted at No. 9 on The New York Times Bestseller List on September 5, 2010.

=== Revenge Wears Prada ===
Revenge Wears Prada, a sequel to The Devil Wears Prada, was released on June 4, 2013 and debuted at No. 3 on The New York Times Bestseller List.

=== The Singles Game ===
The Singles Game was released in 2016.

=== When Life Gives You Lululemons ===
When Life Gives You Lululemons, a second sequel to The Devil Wears Prada, was released in 2018. It follows the character of Emily Charlton, Miranda's Priestly's assistant played by Emily Blunt in the movie adaptation. This book has also been published under the title The Wives.

=== Where the Grass Is Green and the Girls Are Pretty ===
Where the Grass Is Green and the Girls Are Pretty was released in May 2021. This book has also been published as a paperback in the United Kingdom and Ireland under the title One Little Lie.

=== Short stories ===
Her short story "The Bamboo Confessions" is included in the anthology American Girls About Town. It is about a New York City backpacker who travels around the world and, in so doing, begins to view her love life back home in a different light.

== Bibliography ==
- The Devil Wears Prada (2003)
- Everyone Worth Knowing (2005)
- Chasing Harry Winston (2008)
- Last Night at Chateau Marmont (2010)
- Revenge Wears Prada: The Devil Returns (2013)
- The Singles Game (2016)
- When Life Gives You Lululemons (2018)
- Where the Grass Is Green and the Girls Are Pretty (2021)
