= Departures (magazine) =

American digital lifestyle magazine

Departures US
- Former editors: Richard David Story (2000–2017); Jeffries Blackerby (2017–2021); Skye Parrott (2021-2024)
- Categories: Advertising mail
- Frequency: 7 times per year
- Circulation: 1,157,040
- Founded: 1984; 42 years ago
- Final issue: December 2024
- Company: American Express
- Country: United States
- Website: www.departures.com

Departures was an international digital and printed lifestyle magazine with a focus on luxury and travel for holders of American Express Platinum card which published from 1984 until 2024. In the United States, the magazine was originally published by American Express Publishing, then by Time Inc, then by Meredith Corporation until 2021, when American Express brought the publication in-house.

Independently of the U.S. edition, Departures continues to be published both digitally and in print by JI Experience GmbH in international markets, as before. These include countries across Europe, Asia, the Middle East, Australia and Latin America. It continues to be offered as a complimentary benefit to American Express Platinum Card members in these regions.

The longtime editor-in-chief was Richard David Story, who had previously worked at Vogue and Esquire. He spent 17 years at Departures US before leaving in 2017. "Richard had the essential ingredient required of a great editor – massive curiosity", said Graydon Carter, the longtime editor of Vanity Fair. "It carried him through an enviable run at Departures." In May 2017, Jeffries Blackerby was named editor-in-chief. From 2002 to 2006, he had been senior editor at Departures before going on to positions at the New York Times and Vogue. In March 2021, with the suspension of the print edition, Blackerby exited the company and was replaced by Skye Parrott, who led the magazine until it closed in January 2024.

Departures had been purchased from American Express Publishing by Time Inc. on October 1, 2013, along with sister publication Travel + Leisure. In 2017, Meredith purchased Time Inc.'s magazines, including Departures, in a $2.8 billion deal.

At its peak, Departures was said to generate an estimated $50 million a year in revenue. It is known for its colorful layouts and photography, travel essays, and city guides.

== International edition ==
The logo of the international edition, also used by the U.S. edition until 2021

The international edition of Departures, owned by American Express and produced by JI Experience GmbH, operates independently of the discontinued U.S. version. It is managed by a dedicated editorial team, led by editor-in-chief Christian Schwalbach.
