= 2012 Laurence Olivier Awards =

Award ceremony

- Date: 15 April 2012
- Location: Royal Opera House
- Hosted by: Imelda Staunton; Michael Ball

The 2012 Laurence Olivier Awards were held on 15 April 2012 at the Royal Opera House, London.

The 2012 awards were sponsored by MasterCard and was streamed live online for with first time on the Olivier Awards's official website with live BBC Radio 2 coverage from Ken Bruce. The show was presented by Michael Ball and Imelda Staunton for the second year in a row.

Guest presenters included Zach Braff, Tyne Daly, David Suchet, Laurie Metcalf, Hayley Atwell, Jack Davenport, Jim Carter, Lenny Henry, Ronan Keating, James McAvoy, Patrick Stewart, Elaine Paige, Barbara Windsor and Zoë Wanamaker.

== Winners and nominees ==
The nominations were announced on 15 March 2012 in 23 categories.

Best New Play	Best New Musical
Collaborators by John Hodge – National Theatre Cottesloe; Jumpy by April De Angelis – Jerwood Downstairs, Royal Court; One Man, Two Guvnors by Richard Bean – National Theatre Lyttleton; The Ladykillers by Graham Linehan – Gielgud	Matilda – Cambridge; Betty Blue Eyes – Novello; Ghost – Piccadilly; London Road – National Theatre Cottesloe; Shrek – Theatre Royal Drury Lane
Best Revival	Best Musical Revival
Anna Christie – Donmar Warehouse; Flare Path – Haymarket; Much ado about Nothing – Wyndham's; Noises Off – Old Vic	Crazy for You – Regent's Park Open Air; Singin' in the Rain – Palace; South Pacific – Barbican; The Wizard of Oz – London Palladium
Best Entertainment
Derren Brown: Svengali – Shaftesbury; Midnight Tango – Aldwych; Potted Potter – Garrick; The Tiger Who Came to Tea – Vaudeville
Best Actor	Best Actress
Benedict Cumberbatch and Jonny Lee Miller as The Creature/Victor Frankenstein in Frankenstein – Olivier, National Theatre; James Corden as Francis Henshall in One Man, Two Guvnors – National Theatre Lyttleton; David Haig as George III in The Madness of George III – Apollo; Douglas Hodge as William Maitland in Inadmissible Evidence – Donmar Warehouse; Jude Law as Mat Burke in Anna Christie – Donmar Warehouse	Ruth Wilson as Anna Christie in Anna Christie – Donmar Warehouse; Celia Imrie as Dotty Otley in Noises Off – Old Vic; Lesley Manville as Dorothy in Grief – Garrick; Kristin Scott Thomas as Emma in Betrayal – Harold Pinter; Marcia Warren as Mrs Wilberforce in The Ladykillers – Gielgud
Best Actor in a Musical	Best Actress in a Musical
Bertie Carvel as Miss Agatha Trunchbull in Matilda – Cambridge; Nigel Lindsay as Shrek in Shrek – Theatre Royal Drury Lane; Reece Shearsmith as Gilbert Chilvers in Betty Blue Eyes – Novello; Paulo Szot as Emile de Becque in South Pacific – Barbican	Cleo Demetriou, Kerry Ingram, Sophia Kiely and Eleanor Worthington Cox as Matilda Wormwood in Matilda – Cambridge; Kate Fleetwood as Julie in London Road – National Theatre Cottesloe; Sarah Lancashire as Joyce Chilvers in Betty Blue Eyes – Novello; Scarlett Strallen as Kathy Seldon in Singin' in the Rain – Palace
Best Supporting Role	Best Supporting Role in a Musical
Sheridan Smith as Doris, Countess Skriczevinsky in Flare Path – Haymarket; Mark Addy as Vladimir in Collaborators – National Theatre Cottesloe; Oliver Chris as Stanley Stubbers in One Man, Two Guvnors – National Theatre Lyttleton; Johnny Flynn as Lee in Jerusalem – Apollo; Bryony Hannah as Mary Tilford in The Children's Hour – Harold Pinter	Nigel Harman as Lord Farquaad in Shrek – Theatre Royal Drury Lane; Sharon D. Clarke as Oda Mae Brown in Ghost – Piccadilly; Sophie-Louise Dann as Diana Divane in Lend Me a Tenor – Gielgud; Paul Kaye as Mr. Harry Wormwood in Matilda – Cambridge; Katherine Kingsley as Lina Lamont in Singin' in the Rain – Palace
Best Director	Best Theatre Choreographer
Matthew Warchus for Matilda – Cambridge; Sean Foley for The Ladykillers – Gielgud; Nicholas Hytner for One Man, Two Guvnors – National Theatre Lyttleton; Rufus Norris for London Road – National Theatre Cottesloe	Peter Darling for Matilda – Cambridge; Javier de Frutos for London Road – National Theatre Cottesloe; Stephen Mear for Crazy for You – Regent's Park Open Air; Andrew Wright for Singin' in the Rain – Palace
Best Set Design	Best Costume Design
Rob Howell for Matilda – Cambridge; Rob Howell for Ghost – Piccadilly; Michael Taylor for The Ladykillers – Gielgud; Mark Thompson for One Man, Two Guvnors – National Theatre Lyttleton	Peter McKintosh for Crazy for You – Regent's Park Open Air; Rob Howell for Anna Christie – Donmar Warehouse; Tim Hatley for Shrek – Theatre Royal Drury Lane; Catherine Zuber for South Pacific – Barbican
Best Lighting Design	Best Sound Design
Bruno Poet for Frankenstein – Olivier, National Theatre; Howard Harrison for Anna Christie – Donmar Warehouse; Hugh Vanstone for Ghost – Piccadilly; Hugh Vanstone for Matilda – Cambridge	Simon Baker for Matilda – Cambridge; Bobby Aitken for Ghost – Piccadilly; Ed Clarke, Karl Hyde and Rick Smith for Frankenstein – Olivier, National Theatre; Ben Ringham and Max Ringham for The Ladykillers – Gielgud
Outstanding Achievement in Dance	Best New Dance Production
Edward Watson for The Metamorphosis – Linbury Studio, Royal Opera House; The design team for Alice's Adventures in Wonderland, The Royal Ballet – Royal Opera House; Sylvie Guillem in 6000 Miles Away – Sadler's Wells; Tommy Franzén in Some Like It Hip Hop, ZooNation – Peacock	Desh, Akram Khan Company – Sadler's Wells; Gardenia, Les Ballets C de la B – Sadler's Wells; Some Like It Hip Hop, ZooNation – Peacock; The Metamorphosis – Linbury Studio, Royal Opera House
Outstanding Achievement in Opera	Best New Opera Production
English National Opera for the breadth and diversity of its artistic programme; Amanda Holden for translating Castor and Pollux – London Coliseum; Richard Jones for directing Anna Nicole and Il trittico – Royal Opera House and The Tales of Hoffmann – London Coliseum; Mark-Anthony Turnage for composing Anna Nicole – Royal Opera House and Twice through the Heart – Sadler's Wells	Castor and Pollux – London Coliseum; A Midsummer Night's Dream – London Coliseum; Clemency – Linbury Studio, Royal Opera House; The Passenger – London Coliseum
Outstanding Achievement in Affiliate Theatre
Roadkill, Theatre Royal Stratford East – Barbican / Traverse; Mogadishu, Royal Exchange – Lyric Hammersmith; Salt, Root and Roe, Donmar Warehouse – Trafalgar Studios 2; The Village Bike, Royal Court – Jerwood Upstairs
Audience Award
Les Misérables; Billy Elliot; Jersey Boys; Wicked
Society Special Award
Monica Mason; Tim Rice

== Productions with multiple nominations and awards ==
The following 17 productions, including two ballets and two operas, received multiple nominations:

- 9: Matilda
- 5: Anna Christie, Ghost, The Ladykillers and One Man, Two Guvnors
- 4: London Road, Shrek and Singin' in the Rain
- 3: Betty Blue Eyes, Crazy for You, Frankenstein and South Pacific
- 2: Anna Nicole, Castor and Pollux, Collaborators, Flare Path, Noises Off, Some Like It Hip Hop and The Metamorphosis

The following four productions received multiple awards:

- 7: Matilda
- 2: Anna Christie, Crazy for You and Frankenstein

== See also ==
- 66th Tony Awards
- 12th Helpmann Awards
