= Spirit Young Performers Company =

Performing arts school in United Kingdom

Location
- London; United Kingdom
- Coordinates: 51.5270°N 0.1080°W

Information
- Type: Performing arts organisation
- Established: 2013
- Founder: Sophie Boyce

Spirit Young Performers Company is an organisation offering performing arts classes, based in London, which produces original musical numbers and releases them online on YouTube. New performance videos are uploaded every week. The company was created in 2013 by Sophie Boyce and uses multi-camera crews to showcase its students performing.

Among the people who have trained at Spirit Young Performers Company are stars of the Game of Thrones series, Kerry Ingram and Emily Carey. The company has also trained Olivier-Award-Winners Cleo Demetriou, and Sophia Kiely, as well as other young performers such as Lara Wollington, Adrianna Bertola, Sezen Djouma and Chloe Hawthorn. Many students have also gone on to work in films and Netflix series.

Public performances by Spirit YPC include supporting Andrea Bocelli as his children's choir at the O2 Arena, performing Supercalifragilisticexpialidocious from Mary Poppins on the ITV television show Keep it in the Family in 2015, performing a medley from Bring It On the Musical at West End Live in Trafalgar Square, and appearing in 'Magic at the Musicals' at the Royal Albert Hall, which was also broadcast on Magic Radio. Other performances have taken place at the Royal National Theatre Gala, the Hackney Empire, and the Main Stage at MOVE IT.

In 2019, Spirit contributed to the London School Strike for Climate with a performance of their original song #Emergency, written by Sophie Boyce and Fred Feeney.

Performances by Spirit YPC have been mentioned by West End and Broadway social media channels, including those of Everybody's Talking About Jamie, Waitress (musical) and Come From Away. In 2020, Spirit's Hamilton Medley was aired on Disney Plus as part of their Hamilton special.
