= Chloe Hawthorn =

British actress

- Born: Chloe Charlotte Hawthorn; 17 August 2002 (age 24); Havering, England
- Occupation: Actress
- Years active: 2010–present

Chloe Charlotte Hawthorn (born 17 August 2002) is an English actress. She is best known for playing the lead role of Matilda Wormwood in Matilda the Musical (2012–13), a role she shared with Lucy-Mae Beacock, Hayley Canham, Elise Blake, Cristina Fray and Lara Wollington.

== Early life ==
Hawthorn was born in Havering. She attended dance training at Beverly Marks Stage School. She was a member of Spirit Young Performers Company where she trained in musical theatre. She studied acting in college.

== Career ==
Hawthorn was in the original cast of the West End production of The Wizard of Oz and was featured in the original cast recording. In August 2012, Hawthorn landed the lead role of Matilda in Matilda the Musical, taking over from Cleo Demetriou, Jade Marner, Isobelle Molloy and Eleanor Worthington Cox. In her run, Hawthorn, alongside her fellow Matilda's, became judges on the CBBC and BBC One programme, Junior Masterchef. Hawthorn performed with the cast at the 100th Royal Variety Performance where she performed part of the song "Naughty" and also met the Queen and Prince Philip. She then won the Mousetrap Award for Outstanding Female Performance for her portrayal, becoming one of the youngest people to win the award. She was also nominated for an Olivier Award, alongside her fellow cast members, and was featured in the Oliviers 2013 performance alongside Lara Wollington, Elise Blake and Cristina Fray. Hawthorn finished her run in Matilda on 1 September 2013.

Hawthorn then joined the cast of The BFG landing the lead role of Sophie in 2014 at the Birmingham Repertory Theatre alongside Madeleine Haynes and Lara Wollington, finishing her run in early 2015. In April 2016, Hawthorn announced that she would be joining Spirit Young Performers Company, after attending many workshops, that have received millions of views online and on YouTube.

She made her series debut in 2017, in Campfire Creepers at the Sitges Film Festival in Spain directed by Alexandre Aja and joined by Robert Englund in the cast. It was one of the first ever virtual reality horror series to be made and was released in October 2017 in the Oculus Store.

In 2019, Hawthorn featured in a Sainsbury's Valentines Day advert alongside Sonnyboy Skelton. She then starred as Jenna in the docudrama, Impact of Murder, which premiered in July 2019.

== Filmography ==
=== Theatre ===
Year	Production	Role	Theatre	Dates
2011	The Wizard Of Oz	Munchkin	London Palladium	
2012–13	Matilda the Musical	Matilda Wormwood	Cambridge Theatre	
2014–15	The BFG	Sophie	Birmingham Repertory Theatre	
2016	Bring It On: The Musical	Ensemble	West End Live	October 2016

=== Television ===
Year	Title	Role	Notes	Refs
2011	Children In Need	Munchkin	Performed with cast of The Wizard Of Oz	
2012	Junior Masterchef	Herself	Guest judge	
2012	Royal Variety Performance	Matilda	100th anniversary performance	
2017	Campfire Creepers	Trina	Main role	
2019	Impact Of Murder	Jenna	1 episode	
