= Matilda Wormwood =

Fictional character in literature

- Matilda character
- Mara Wilson as Matilda Wormwood
- First appearance: Matilda (1988)
- Created by: Roald Dahl
- Portrayed by: In the films: Mara Wilson (1996); Alisha Weir (2022); In the musical: Kerry Ingram
- other names: Matilda Honey

In-universe information
- Full name: Matilda Wormwood
- Gender: Female
- Occupation: Student
- Family: Harry Wormwood (father); Zinnia Wormwood (mother); Michael Wormwood (older brother); Julian Honey (adoptive father); Jennifer Honey (adoptive mother)
- Relatives: Magnus Honey (adoptive grandfather, deceased); Mrs. Honey (adoptive grandmother, deceased); Agatha Trunchbull (adoptive step-great-aunt)
- Nationality: British (American in the 1996 film adaptation)

Matilda Wormwood is the fictional title character of the bestselling 1988 children's novel Matilda by Roald Dahl. She is a highly precocious five and a half (six and a half in the 1996 film) year old girl who has a passion for reading books. Her parents do not recognize her great intelligence and show little interest in her, particularly her father, a secondhand car dealer who neglects and verbally abuses her. She discovers she has telekinetic powers which she uses to her advantage. She then gets adopted by Miss Honey, who has taught her at her school, who is very nice to her and does notice her intelligence.

In the BBC Radio 4 two-part adaptation of the novel, she is played by Lauren Mote, and in the 1996 film, she is portrayed by American actress Mara Wilson. In the 2022 film, she is played by Alisha Weir.

== Fictional biography ==
Matilda is a young girl of genius intelligence, having developed skills such as walking and speech at an early age. At 18 months she was able to converse at an adult level, and was reading on a par with adults by the age of four. These characteristics, however, are ignored or dismissed by her parents who want her to watch television in order to discourage her literacy skills. Matilda, in return, plays practical jokes on her parents (her father in particular), such as replacing her father's hair tonic with her mother's platinum blonde hair dye and gluing her father's favourite hat to his head with "Super-Super Glue".

== Special abilities ==
Matilda's intellect has given her telekinetic abilities, which she discovered in class one day after inadvertently tipping over a glass of water containing a live newt on Miss Trunchbull. Matilda decides to exercise this ability at home by levitating a cigar. She continues to refine her talent, and learns of Miss Honey's traumatic childhood at the hands of her aunt and guardian, Miss Trunchbull, after her father Magnus' unexpected death. Matilda develops a scheme in revenge against Miss Trunchbull, and in class one day she levitates a piece of chalk to the blackboard while Miss Trunchbull is visiting the room and tormenting the students, posing as the spirit of Magnus and threatening to punish Miss Trunchbull by name if she does not leave her inheritance to his daughter. Horrified, she completely vanishes from existence following the events of Matilda's practical joke, leaving her house and worldly possessions to her niece, without any information established relating to her current whereabouts.

After the position of headmaster is taken by a different teacher, Matilda is moved to the year six classroom, but finds herself unable to summon her telekinetic abilities. One day, Miss Honey suggests that her previously unused potential was fueling her telekinesis, but now she is being suitably challenged she has no potential left to spare on her special talent. In the 1996 film version, Matilda does not lose her telekinetic abilities, but instead chooses not to use them except for trivial matters.

== Portrayals ==
In the 1996 film Matilda was portrayed by American child actress Mara Wilson. Newborn Matilda was portrayed by two sets of twins: Alissa and Amanda Graham and Trevor and James Gallagher; nine-month-old Matilda was portrayed by Kayla and Kelsey Fredericks; toddler Matilda by Amanda and Caitlin Fein and four-year-old Matilda by Sara Magdalin.

In the musical Stratford production Matilda was portrayed by three young actresses: Adrianna Bertola, Josie Griffiths and Kerry Ingram.

When the production moved to the West End Ingram was the only one who transferred and three new actresses were brought in: Cleo Demetriou, Sophia Kiely and Eleanor Worthington Cox. Since then, Matilda has been portrayed by over 100 different actresses.

In the 2022 film she is played by Alisha Weir.
