= Laurence Olivier Award for Best Actress in a Musical =

Annual award for London theatre

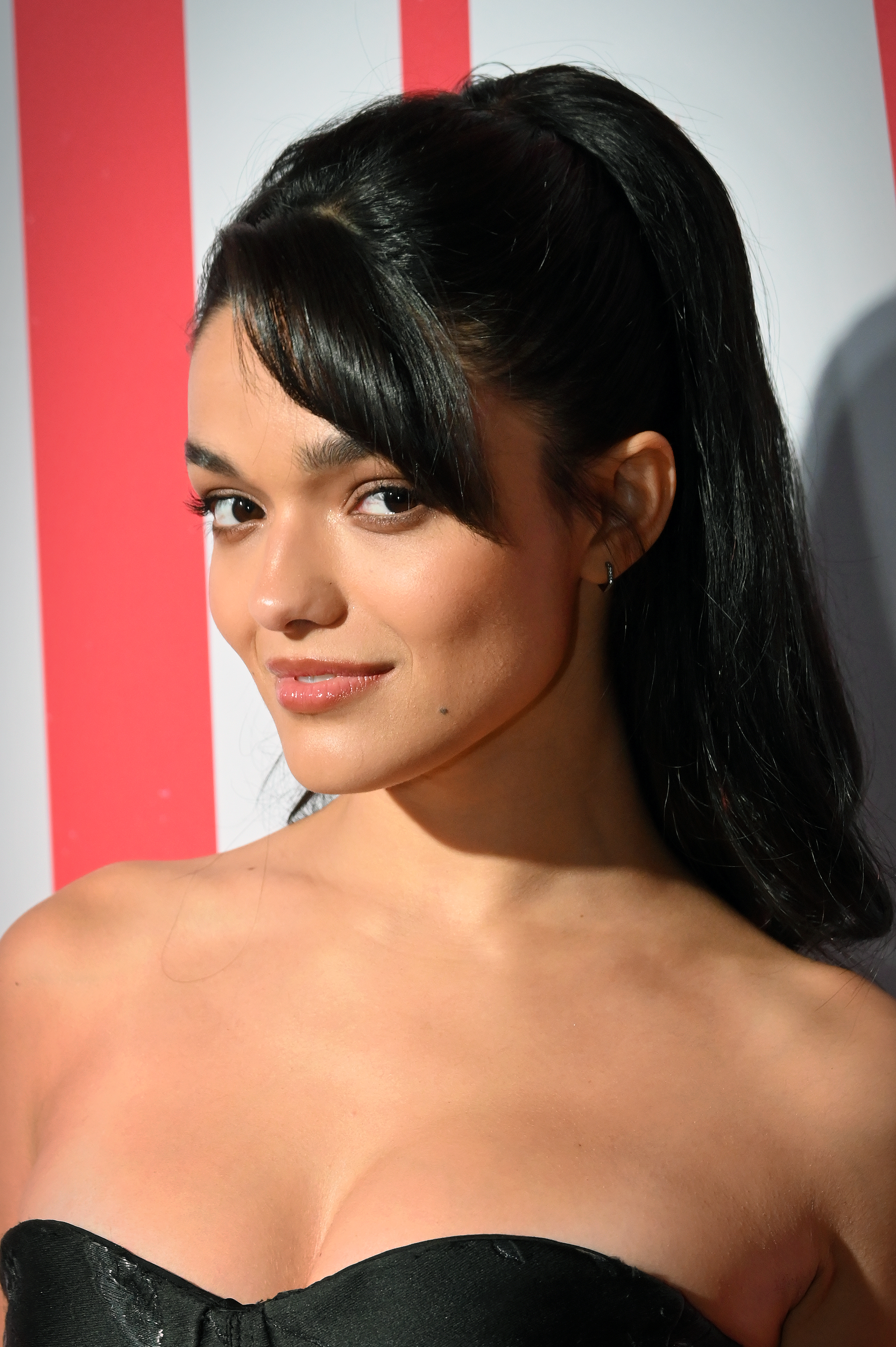
- 2026 Recipient: Rachel Zegler
- Awarded for: Best Actress in a Musical
- Location: England
- Presented by: Society of London Theatre
- First award: 1979
- Currently held by: Rachel Zegler for Evita (2026)
- Website: officiallondontheatre.com/olivier-awards/

The Laurence Olivier Award for Best Actress in a Musical is an annual award presented by the Society of London Theatre in recognition of the "world-class status of London theatre." The awards were established as the Society of West End Theatre Awards in 1976, and renamed in 1984 in honour of English actor and director Laurence Olivier.

This award was introduced in 1979, along with the award for Best Actor in a Musical. In 1977 and 1978, there had been a commingled actor/actress award for Best Performance in a Musical, won both times by an actress.

== Winners and nominees ==
=== 1970s ===
Year	Actress	Musical	Character
1979
1979	Virginia McKenna	The King and I	Anna Leonowens
1979	Carol Channing	Hello, Dolly!	Dolly Gallagher Levi
1979	Antonia Ellis	Chicago	Velma Kelly
1979	Liz Robertson	My Fair Lady	Eliza Doolittle

=== 1980s ===
Year	Actress	Musical	Character
1980
1980	Gemma Craven	They're Playing Our Song	Sonia Walsk
1980	Sheila Hancock	Sweeney Todd: The Demon Barber of Fleet Street	Mrs. Lovett
1980	Julia McKenzie	On the Twentieth Century	Lily Garland
1980	Siân Phillips	Pal Joey	Vera Simpson
1981
1981	Carlin Glynn	The Best Little Whorehouse in Texas	Mona Stangley
1981	Petula Clark	The Sound of Music	Maria von Trapp
1981	Patricia Hodge	The Mitford Girls	Nancy Mitford
1981	Sylvia Kuumba Williams	One Mo' Time	"Big Bertha" Williams
1982
1982	Julia McKenzie	Guys and Dolls	Miss Adelaide
1982	Val McLane	Andy Capp	Florrie
1982	Imelda Staunton	The Beggar's Opera	Lucy Lockit
1982	Marti Webb	Song and Dance	Emma
1983
1983	Barbara Dickson	Blood Brothers	Mrs. Johnstone
1983	Ellen Greene	Little Shop of Horrors	Audrey
1983	Stephanie Lawrence	Marilyn	Marilyn Monroe
1983	Sarah Payne	Singin' in the Rain	Lina Lamont
1984
1984	Natalia Makarova	On Your Toes	Vera Barnova
1984	Julia Hills	The Hired Man	Emily
1984	Clare Leach	42nd Street	Peggy Sawyer
1984	Sheila White	Little Me	Belle
1985
1985	Patti LuPone	Les Misérables	Fantine
1985	Patti LuPone	The Cradle Will Rock	Moll
1985	Betsy Brantley	Guys and Dolls	Miss Adelaide
1985	Carol Sloman	Lennon	Performer
1985	Elisabeth Welch	Jerome Kern Goes to Hollywood	Performer
1986
1986	Lesley Mackie	Judy	Judy Garland
1986	Maureen Lipman	Wonderful Town	Ruth Sherwood
1986	Elaine Paige	Chess	Florence
1986	Angela Richards	Side by Side by Sondheim	Herself
1987
1987	Nichola McAuliffe	Kiss Me, Kate	Lilli Vanessi / Katharine
1987	Dee Dee Bridgewater	Lady Day	Billie Holiday
1987	Julia McKenzie	Follies	Sally Durant Plummer
1987	Carol Woods	Blues in the Night	Performer
1988
1988	Patricia Routledge	Candide	Old Lady
1988	Kiki Dee	Blood Brothers	Mrs. Johnstone
1988	Ann Miller	Sugar Babies	Ann
1988	Imelda Staunton	The Wizard of Oz	Dorothy Gale
1989/90
1989/90	Lea Salonga	Miss Saigon	Kim
1989/90	Patricia Hodge	Noël and Gertie	Gertie
1989/90	Judy Kuhn	Metropolis	Maria / Futura
1989/90	Elaine Paige	Anything Goes	Reno Sweeney

=== 1990s ===
Year	Actress	Musical	Character
1991
1991	Imelda Staunton	Into the Woods	The Baker's Wife
1991	Sally Burgess	Show Boat	Julie
1991	Maria Friedman	Sunday in the Park with George	Dot / Marie
1991	Julia McKenzie	Into the Woods	The Witch
1992
1992	Wilhelmenia Fernandez	Carmen Jones	Carmen
1992	Sharon Benson	Carmen Jones	Carmen
1992	Linzi Hateley	Joseph and the Amazing Technicolor Dreamcoat	Narrator
1992	Miriam Margolyes	Dickens' Women	Various Characters
1993
1993	Joanna Riding	Carousel	Julie Jordan
1993	Kim Criswell	Annie Get Your Gun	Annie Oakley
1993	Ruthie Henshall	Crazy for You	Polly Baker
1993	Kelly Hunter	The Blue Angel	Lola
1994
1994	Julia McKenzie	Sweeney Todd: The Demon Barber of Fleet Street	Mrs. Lovett
1994	Haydn Gwynne	City of Angels	Oolie / Donna
1994	Patti LuPone	Sunset Boulevard	Norma Desmond
1994	Elaine Paige	Piaf	Édith Piaf
1995
1995	Ruthie Henshall	She Loves Me	Amalia
1995	Betty Buckley	Sunset Boulevard	Norma Desmond
1995	Sally Dexter	Oliver!	Nancy
1996
1996	Judi Dench	A Little Night Music	Desirée Armfeldt
1996	Elizabeth Mansfield	Marie	Marie Lloyd
1996	Caroline O'Connor	Mack & Mabel	Mabel
1996	Elaine Paige	Sunset Boulevard	Norma Desmond
1997
1997	Maria Friedman	Passion	Fosca
1997	B.J. Crosby	Smokey Joe's Café	Performer
1997	Joanna Riding	Guys and Dolls	Sarah Brown
1997	Imelda Staunton	Guys and Dolls	Miss Adelaide
1998
1998	Ute Lemper	Chicago	Velma Kelly
1998	Maria Friedman	Lady in the Dark	Liza Elliott
1998	Ruthie Henshall	Chicago	Roxie Hart
1998	Siân Phillips	Marlene	Marlene Dietrich
1999
1999	Sophie Thompson	Into the Woods	The Baker's Wife
1999	Krysten Cummings	Rent	Mimi Márquez
1999	Maria Friedman	Chicago	Roxie Hart
1999	Josefina Gabrielle	Oklahoma!	Laurey

=== 2000s ===
Year	Actress	Musical	Character
2000
2000	Barbara Dickson	Spend Spend Spend	Viv Nicholson
2000	Josette Bushell-Mingo	The Lion King	Rafiki
2000	Rachel Leskovac	Spend Spend Spend	Young Viv Nicholson
2000	Siobhan McCarthy	Mamma Mia!	Donna Sheridan
2001
2001	Samantha Spiro	Merrily We Roll Along	Mary Flynn
2001	Nicola Hughes	Fosse	Performer
2001	Joanna Riding	The Witches of Eastwick	Jane Smart
2001	Josie Walker	The Beautiful Game	Mary
2002
2002	Martine McCutcheon	My Fair Lady	Eliza Doolittle
2002	Barbara Cook	Barbara Cook Sings Mostly Sondheim	Herself
2002	Ruthie Henshall	Peggy Sue Got Married	Peggy Sue
2002	Marin Mazzie	Kiss Me, Kate	Lilli Vanessi / Katharine
2003
2003	Joanna Riding	My Fair Lady	Eliza Doolittle
2003	Janie Dee	My One and Only	Edith Herbert
2003	Elaine Stritch	Elaine Stritch at Liberty	Herself
2003	Sarah Wildor	Contact	Wife
2004
2004	Maria Friedman	Ragtime	Mother
2004	Amanda Holden	Thoroughly Modern Millie	Millie Dilmount
2004	Alison Jiear	Jerry Springer	Shawntel
2004	Maureen Lipman	Thoroughly Modern Millie	Mrs. Meers
2005
2005	Laura Michelle Kelly	Mary Poppins	Mary Poppins
2005	Maria Friedman	The Woman in White	Marian
2005	Leigh Zimmerman	The Producers	Ulla
2006
2006	Jane Krakowski	Guys and Dolls	Miss Adelaide
2006	Haydn Gwynne	Billy Elliot	Mrs. Wilkinson
2006	Jenna Russell	Guys and Dolls	Sarah Brown
2006	Julie Walters	Acorn Antiques	Mrs. Overall
2007
2007	Jenna Russell	Sunday in the Park with George	Dot / Marie
2007	Nicola Hughes	Porgy and Bess	Bess
2007	Tonya Pinkins	Caroline, or Change	Caroline Thibodeaux
2007	Elena Roger	Evita	Eva Perón
2007	Hannah Waddingham	Spamalot	Lady of the Lake
2008
2008	Leanne Jones	Hairspray	Tracy Turnblad
2008	Lara Pulver	Parade	Lucille Frank
2008	Sheridan Smith	Little Shop of Horrors	Audrey
2008	Summer Strallen	The Drowsy Chaperone	Janet Van Der Graaf
2009
2009	Elena Roger	Piaf	Édith Piaf
2009	Sofia Escobar	West Side Story	Maria
2009	Kathryn Evans	Sunset Boulevard	Norma Desmond
2009	Ruthie Henshall	Marguerite	Marguerite
2009	Emma Williams	Zorro	Luisa

=== 2010s ===
Year	Actress	Musical	Character
2010
2010	Samantha Spiro	Hello, Dolly!	Dolly Levi
2010	Melanie C	Blood Brothers	Mrs. Johnstone
2010	Patina Miller	Sister Act	Deloris Van Cartier
2010	Hannah Waddingham	A Little Night Music	Desirée Armfeldt
2010	Charlotte Wakefield	Spring Awakening	Wendla
2011
2011	Sheridan Smith	Legally Blonde	Elle Woods
2011	Sierra Boggess	Love Never Dies	Christine Daaé
2011	Elena Roger	Passion	Fosca
2011	Emma Williams	Love Story	Jenny
2012
2012	Cleo Demetriou, Kerry Ingram, Sophia Kiely, Eleanor Worthington Cox	Matilda	Matilda Wormwood
2012	Kate Fleetwood	London Road	Julie
2012	Sarah Lancashire	Betty Blue Eyes	Joyce Chilvers
2012	Scarlett Strallen	Singin' in the Rain	Kathy Seldon
2013
2013	Imelda Staunton	Sweeney Todd: The Demon Barber of Fleet Street	Mrs. Lovett
2013	Heather Headley	The Bodyguard	Rachel Marron
2013	Summer Strallen	Top Hat	Dale Tremont
2013	Hannah Waddingham	Kiss Me, Kate	Lilli Vanessi / Katharine
2014
2014	Zrinka Cvitešić	Once	Girl
2014	Rosalie Craig	The Light Princess	The Light Princess
2014	Jenna Russell	Merrily We Roll Along	Mary Flynn
2014	Charlotte Wakefield	The Sound of Music	Maria von Trapp
2015
2015	Katie Brayben	Beautiful	Carole King
2015	Gemma Arterton	Made in Dagenham	Rita O'Grady
2015	Tamsin Greig	Women on the Verge of a Nervous Breakdown	Pepa Marcos
2015	Beverley Knight	Memphis	Felicia Farrell
2016
2016	Imelda Staunton	Gypsy	Mama Rose
2016	Tracie Bennett	Mrs Henderson Presents	Laura Henderson
2016	Natalie Dew	Bend It Like Beckham	Jess Bhamra
2016	Laura Pitt-Pulford	Seven Brides for Seven Brothers	Milly
2016	Sophie Thompson	Guys and Dolls	Miss Adelaide
2017	Amber Riley	Dreamgirls	Effie White
2017	Glenn Close	Sunset Boulevard	Norma Desmond
2017	Debbie Chazen, Sophie-Louise Dann, Michele Dotrice, Claire Machin, Claire Moore and Joanna Riding	The Girls	The Girls
2017	Sheridan Smith	Funny Girl	Fanny Brice
2018
2018	Shirley Henderson	Girl from the North Country	Elizabeth Lane
2018	Janie Dee	Follies	Phyllis Rogers Stone
2018	Imelda Staunton	Follies	Sally Durant Plummer
2018	Josie Walker	Everybody's Talking About Jamie	Margaret New
2019
2019	Sharon D. Clarke	Caroline, or Change	Caroline Thibodeaux
2019	Rosalie Craig	Company	Bobbie
2019	Kelli O'Hara	The King and I	Anna Leonowens
2019	Adrienne Warren	Tina	Tina Turner

=== 2020s ===
Year	Actress	Musical	Character
2020	Miriam-Teak Lee	& Juliet	Juliet Capulet
2020	Audrey Brisson	Amélie	Amélie Poulain
2020	Judy Kuhn	Fiddler on the Roof	Golde
2020	Zizi Strallen	Mary Poppins	Mary Poppins
2021	Not presented due to extended closing of theatre productions during COVID-19 pandemic (Note: Due to late March 2020 to late July 2021 closing of London theatre productions during the COVID-19 pandemic in England, the 2022 awards recognise productions that launched anytime from February 2020 to February 2022)		
2022	Jessie Buckley	Cabaret	Sally Bowles
2022	Sutton Foster	Anything Goes	Reno Sweeney
2022	Beverley Knight	The Drifters Girl	Faye Treadwell
2022	Stephanie McKeon	Frozen	Anna
2023	Katie Brayben	Tammy Faye	Tammy Faye Messner
2023	Anoushka Lucas	Oklahoma!	Laurey Williams
2023	Miri Mesika	The Band's Visit	Dina
2023	Faith Omole	Standing at the Sky's Edge	Joy
2024
2024	Nicole Scherzinger	Sunset Boulevard	Norma Desmond
2024	Natasha Hodgson	Operation Mincemeat	Ewen Montagu & Others
2024	Caissie Levy	Next to Normal	Diana Goodman
2024	Marisha Wallace	Guys and Dolls	Miss Adelaide
2025	Imelda Staunton	Hello, Dolly!	Dolly Gallagher Levi
2025	Chumisa Dornford-May	Natasha, Pierre & The Great Comet of 1812	Natasha Rostova
2025	Lauren Drew	Titanique	Celine Dion
2025	Clare Foster	The Curious Case of Benjamin Button	Elowen Keene
2025	Lara Pulver	Fiddler on the Roof	Golde
2026	Rachel Zegler	Evita	Eva Perón
2026	Katie Brayben	Into The Woods	The Baker's Wife
2026	Danielle Fiamanya and Georgina Onuorah	Brigadoon	Fiona MacLaren
2026	Jane Krakowski	Here We Are	Marianne Brink
2026	Jenna Russell	The Unlikely Pilgrimage Of Harold Fry	Maureen Fry

== Multiple awards and nominations for Best Actress in a Musical ==
=== Awards ===
Four awards

- Imelda Staunton

Two awards

- Barbara Dickson
- Maria Friedman
- Julia McKenzie
- Joanna Riding
- Samantha Spiro
- Katie Brayben

=== Nominations ===
Seven nominations

- Imelda Staunton

Six nominations

- Maria Friedman

Five nominations

- Ruthie Henshall
- Julia McKenzie
- Joanna Riding

Four nominations

- Elaine Paige
- Jenna Russell

Three nominations

- Elena Roger
- Sheridan Smith
- Hannah Waddingham
- Katie Brayben

Two nominations

- Rosalie Craig
- Janie Dee
- Barbara Dickson
- Haydn Gwynne
- Patricia Hodge
- Nicola Hughes
- Beverley Knight
- Judy Kuhn
- Maureen Lipman
- Patti LuPone
- Siân Phillips
- Samantha Spiro
- Summer Strallen
- Sophie Thompson
- Charlotte Wakefield
- Josie Walker
- Emma Williams
- Lara Pulver
- Jane Krakowski

== Multiple awards and nominations for a character ==
=== Awards ===
2 awards

- Dolly Levi from Hello, Dolly!
- Eliza Doolittle from My Fair Lady
- Miss Adelaide from Guys and Dolls
- Mrs. Lovett from Sweeney Todd: The Demon Barber of Fleet Street
- The Baker's Wife from Into the Woods

=== Nominations ===
6 nominations

- Miss Adelaide from Guys and Dolls
- Norma Desmond from Sunset Boulevard

3 nominations

- Dolly Levi from Hello, Dolly!
- Eliza Doolittle from My Fair Lady
- Lilli Vanessi / Katharine from Kiss Me, Kate
- Mrs. Johnstone from Blood Brothers
- Mrs. Lovett from Sweeney Todd: The Demon Barber of Fleet Street

2 nominations

- Audrey from Little Shop of Horrors
- Caroline Thibodeaux from Caroline, or Change
- Desirée Armfeldt from A Little Night Music
- Dot / Marie from Sunday in the Park with George
- Édith Piaf from Piaf
- Eva Perón from Evita
- Fosca from Passion
- Laurey Williams from Oklahoma!
- Maria von Trapp from The Sound of Music
- Mary Flynn from Merrily We Roll Along
- Mary Poppins from Mary Poppins
- Reno Sweeney from Anything Goes
- Roxie Hart from Chicago
- Sally Durant Plummer from Follies
- Sarah Brown from Guys and Dolls
- The Baker's Wife from Into the Woods
- Velma Kelly from Chicago

== See also ==
- Best Actress
- Drama Desk Award for Outstanding Actress in a Leading Role in a Musical
- Lists of acting awards
- Tony Award for Best Actress in a Musical
- WhatsOnStage Award for Best Actress in a Musical
