= Adrianna Bertola =

British actress

- Born: 9 February 1999 (age 26); Southend-on-Sea, Essex, England
- Occupations: Actress; singer
- Years active: 2006–present
- Website: adriannabertola.co.uk

Adrianna Jean Bertola (born 9 February 1999) is an English actress who rose to attention playing Gretl von Trapp in The Sound of Music and Sharice Brooks in Casualty. She also played Violet Beauregarde in Charlie and the Chocolate Factory the Musical from May to November 2013.

On 22 September 2014, Bertola released her first single, titled "Fire and Ice", through the Spirit Young Performers Company.

== Early life ==
Adrianna Jean Bertola was born on 9 February 1999 in Southend-on-Sea, Essex. She is of Italian descent.

== Career ==
Bertola's first appearance was in The Sound of Music where Bertola played the role of Gretl von Trapp and received a standing ovation on the opening performance. At the time she was signed up to the Morgan Academy for Performing Arts. Bertola then appeared in Les Misérables as Young Cosette. Bertola's next role was in Casualty where Bertola played Sharice Brooks, a recurring character throughout series 23 of the long-running medical drama. In 2010, Bertola played the titular role of Matilda in the Stratford Production of Matilda the Musical where she shared the role with two other young actresses; Kerry Ingram and Josie Griffiths. She also sang the song 'Quiet' for the Matilda the Musical Original Soundtrack. During her run received favourable reviews. However, due to her height, Bertola was unable to transfer to the West End production. In 2011, Bertola played Brigitta Von Trapp in a tour of The Sound of Music. She also appeared in Jessie J's music video of Who's Laughing Now, in which she played the younger version of Jessie J and has subsequently been dubbed as 'Mini Jessie J'. Bertola attended the Sylvia Young Theatre School. Adrianna was in the West End production of Charlie and the Chocolate Factory the Musical, playing Violet Beaugarde at the Theatre Royal, Drury Lane until her contract ran out on 12 November 2013.

== Discography ==
=== Singles ===
- Fire and Ice

== Filmography ==
=== Film and television ===
Year	Title	Role	Notes
2008	This Morning	Herself	18 November
2008–2009	Casualty	Sharice Brooks	Series 23
2009	Magic Grandad	Eliza	Episode: Mrs. Beeton
2009	Mister Eleven	Young Saz	Episode One
2009	Ant & Dec's Saturday Night Takeaway	Herself	Dancer
2009	Watchdog	Herself	Model
2010	Girl Blue Running Shoe	Daughter	Short
2010	Little Einsteins	June	Episode: Rockets Firebird Rescue
2010	Doctors	Gemma Branscombe	Episode: Visible Wounds
2010	The Little House	Young Ruth	Episode One
2010	Breakfast	Herself	
2011	Silent Witness	8 Year Old Girl	A Guilty Mind: Part 1
2011	Silent Witness	8 Year Old Girl	A Guilty Mind: Part 2
2012	Nativity 2: Danger in the Manger	Herself	Mr. Shakespeare's class
2015–2016	Hank Zipzer	Anya	Series 2 – Series 3
2016	Call the Midwife	Cathy Tanner	1 episode
2017	Kiss Me First	Jane	1 Episode
2018	Doctors	Daisy Bridges	1 Episode
2018	London Kills	Carly Bradford	Series 1 – Series 2

=== Theatre ===
Year	Production	Role	Theatre	Dates
2006	The Sound of Music	Gretl von Trapp	London Palladium	3 November 2006 – 22 September 2007
2007	Les Misérables	Young Cosette	Queen's Theatre	November 2007 – 21 June 2008
2010	Matilda the Musical	Matilda Wormwood	Courtyard Theatre	November 2010 – 30 January 2011
2011	The Sound of Music	Brigitta von Trapp	Plenary Hall Convention Centre	June 2011
2013	Charlie and the Chocolate Factory the Musical	Violet Beauregarde	Theatre Royal, Drury Lane	22 May 2013 – 12 November 2013
2017–2018	The Twilight Zone	Markie, Little Girl, Tina, Lily	Almeida Theatre	December 2017 – January 2018
2018	Blueberry Toast	Jill	Soho Theatre	May 2018 – June 2018
