= Miriam-Teak Lee =

British actress

- Born: 1 November 1994 (age 31); Edmonton, London, England
- Education: The Latymer School; Morgan Aslanoff School of Dance; Arts Educational School
- Occupation: Actress
- Years active: 2017–present
- Known for: & Juliet (2019–2023); Hamilton (2017–2019); On the Town (2017)
- Relatives: Dex Lee (brother)
- Awards: Laurence Olivier Award for Best Actress in a Musical (2020); WhatsOnStage Award for Best Actress in a Musical (2020)

Miriam-Teak Lee (born 1 November 1994) is an English actress. She is known for her role as Juliet Capulet in & Juliet, for which she won a 2020 Laurence Olivier Award for Best Actress in a Leading Role in a Musical.

== Early life and education ==
Lee has an older brother, Dex Lee, as well as three other brothers. Alongside Dex, she attended The Latymer School, Morgan Aslanoff School of Dance and Arts Educational School. The pair were duet partners and competed in dance competitions together.

== Acting career ==
After leaving school, Lee made her London stage debut in Leonard Bernstein's musical On the Town at the Regent's Park Open Air Theatre in 2017. Two months later she made her West End debut in the original London production of Lin-Manuel Miranda's musical Hamilton at the Victoria Palace Theatre. In Hamilton, Lee was a member of the ensemble and the understudy for the leading roles of Eliza Hamilton, Angelica Schuyler Church and Peggy Schuyler. In 2019, she was chosen to play the eponymous protagonist in the juke-box musical & Juliet at the Manchester Opera House and then at the Shaftesbury Theatre in London's West End. For her performance Lee won critics' praises and the Laurence Olivier Award for Best Actress in a Leading Role in a Musical.

== Filmography ==
Year	Title	Role	Notes
2020	Moominvalley	Seahorses	Voice role; 2 episodes
2022	Olivier Awards	Guest Presenter	1 episode
2025	Doctor Who	Cora Saint Bavier	Episode: "The Interstellar Song Contest"

== Accolades ==
Year	Award	Category	Work	Result	Ref.
2017	The Stage Debut Award	Best Actress in a Musical	On the Town	Won	
2020	Laurence Olivier Award	Best Actress in a Leading Role in a Musical	& Juliet	Won	
2020	WhatsOnStage Award	Best Actress in a Leading Role in a Musical	& Juliet	Won	
2020	Black British Theatre Awards	Best Female Actor in a Musical	& Juliet	Won	

== See also ==
- List of British actors
