= Lara Wollington =

English actress

- Born: 30 March 2003 (age 23); Enfield, London, England
- Occupation: Actress
- Years active: 2010–present
- Known for: Matilda the Musical Bring It On

Lara Wollington (born 30 March 2003) is an English actress who voiced Lucy in the fourth season of 64 Zoo Lane and portrayed in West End theatre. She is best known for portraying the lead role of Matilda, in Matilda the Musical at London's Cambridge Theatre.

== Career ==
After standing by for the role of Young Fiona and the dual roles of Young Shrek and a Dwarf in Shrek the Musical at the Theatre Royal Drury Lane from September 2011 to February 2012, she began to play Matilda Wormwood in Matilda the Musical at Cambridge Theatre. Wollington began performances in August 2012 and initially shared the role with Lucy-Mae Beacock, Hayley Canham and Chloe Hawthorn and later with: Elise Blake, Cristina Fray and Chloe Hawthorn. Her last show in Matilda was on 29 September 2013. Her other appearances include "Big Brother's Big Mouth" and Princess Florrie in "Florrie's Dragons". In 2012, she starred as Sammy Taylor in the horror film Young, High and Dead.

Wollington went on to perform the role of Sophie in the Birmingham Repertory Theatre's production of the BFG. She was then cast in the original cast of Gypsy at the Savoy Theatre. In 2017, Wollington was cast as the female lead - Pandora - in The Secret Diary of Adrian Mole Aged 13¾ at the Menier Chocolate Factory from July to September. She was one of three girls cast, alongside Georgia Pemberton and Asha Banks.

Since 2023, she has been teaching dance at Chiswick Theatrical Arts.

== Personal life ==
Wollington attended Spirit Young Performers Company and was a member of its Elite Musical Theatre Team and Elite Dance Troupe. She left the company claiming it took up too much of her time in 2018.

She attended ballet classes at Cheshunt Dancing School in Cheshunt Hertfordshire. Wollington studied in Arts Educational Schools from 2022 until her graduation in 2025.

== Filmography ==
=== Television ===
| Year | Title | Role | Notes |
|---|---|---|---|
| 2010–2011 | Florrie's Dragons | Princess Florrie | Main role |
| 2014–2015 | Wanda and The Alien | Wanda | 2 episodes |
| 2012–2013 | 64 Zoo Lane | Lucy | Season 4 |

=== Theatre ===
| Year | Production | Role | Theatre | Dates |
|---|---|---|---|---|
| 2011–12 | Shrek The Musical | Standby Young Fiona | Theatre Royal, Drury Lane | 2011–27 February 2012 |
| 2012–13 | Matilda the Musical | Matilda Wormwood | Cambridge Theatre | 25 August 2012 – 29 September 2013 |
| 2014–15 | The BFG | Sophie | Birmingham Repertory Theatre | 27 November 2014 – 23 January 2015 |
| 2015 | Gypsy | Baby Louise | Savoy Theatre | 3 April–25 November 2015 |
| 2016 | Bring It On: The Musical | Campbell | West End Live | October 2016 |
| 2017 | The Secret Diary of Adrian Mole aged 13¾ | Pandora | Menier Chocolate Factory | 14 July-9 September 2017 |
