= Josie Walker =

Irish actress (born 1970)

- Born: 1970 (age 55–56); Belfast, Northern Ireland
- Occupation: Actress

Josie Walker (born 1970) is an actress born in Belfast, Northern Ireland. She was brought up in England.

== Career ==
=== Musicals ===
- The Phantom of the Opera (Manchester, 1992; London, 1996)
- Cats (English tour, 1995)
- The Beautiful Game (London, 2000) - Laurence Olivier Award for Best Actress in a Musical nominee
- Evita (New Zealand tour, 2004)
- Assassins (Sheffield, 2006)
- Side by Side by Sondheim (London, 2007)
- Matilda the Musical (Stratford, 2010; London, 2011)
- Everybody's Talking About Jamie (London, 2017; Laurence Olivier Award for Best Actress in a Musical nominee).

=== Theatre ===
She has also starred in theatre, including War Horse at the Royal National Theatre in 2012.

Other plays at the National include: The Silver Tassie, 3 Winters, Husbands and Sons, The Plough and the Stars, and most recently The Ocean at the End of the Lane, for which she was nominated for Best Actress in a supporting role 2020 Olivier Awards.

=== Television ===
Year	Title	Role	Notes
1995	The Bill	Civilian Receptionist	Episode: "Stopping Time"
2005	Blessed	Cynthia	Episode: "I'm in Love with My Car"
2008	EastEnders	P.C. Parsons	Episode #1.3499
2008–2015	Holby City	Sara Clooney; Jacqui Pennington; Mandy Reynolds	3 episodes
2010	Psychoville	Busty Janet	Episode: "Halloween Special"
2013	Waterloo Road	Theresa Doherty	Episode: "Nowhere to Run"
2014	Call the Midwife	Officer Owen	Episode #3.3
2015	Midwinter of the Spirit	Sister Cullen	Miniseries; 2 episodes
2019	Vera	Mary-Frances Lascola	Episode: "The Seagull"
2020	White House Farm	Helene Jones	Episode #1.4
2022	This Is Going to Hurt	Non-Reassuring Trace	Miniseries; 5 episodes
2024	Dalgliesh	Martha Tate	2 episodes
2025	Andor	Force Healer	2 episodes: "Messenger", "Jedha, Kyber, Erso"
2026	Maya	Debs	

=== Film ===
Key
†	Denotes works that have not yet been released

Year	Title	Role	Notes
2014	Fishbowl	Mary	Short
2018	Where Hands Touch	Kapo	
2021	Belfast	Auntie Violet	
2022	The Wonder	Sister Michael	
2023	In Camera	Joanna	
2024	Kneecap	Detective Ellis	
2024	Edge of Summer	Yvonne	
2024	The Cost of Hugging	Erica	Short
2026	Sunny Dancer	Brenda	

=== Video games ===
Year	Title	Role	Notes
2025	Atomfall	Iris the Baker	
