= Elena Roger =

Argentine actress (born 1974)

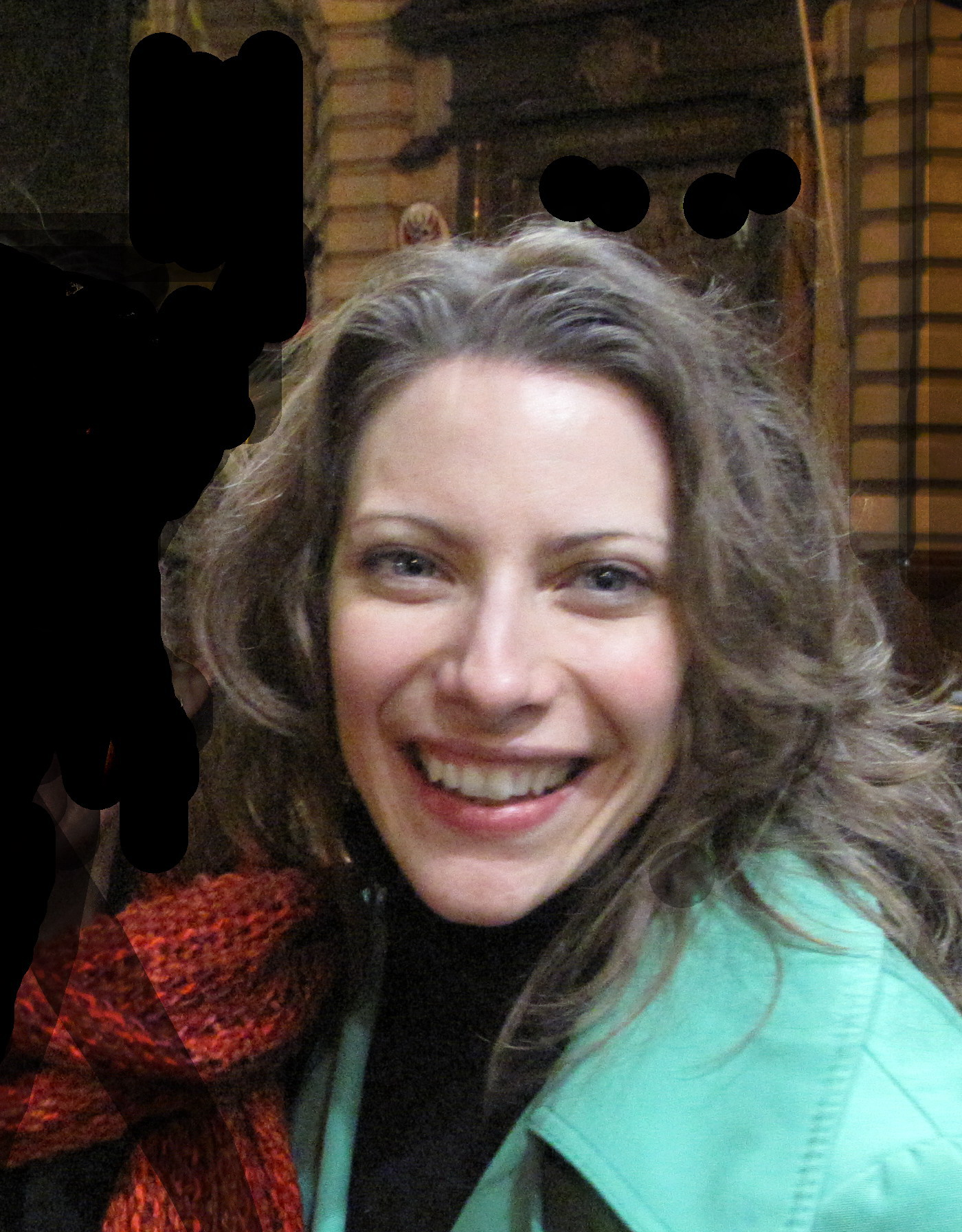
- Born: 27 October 1974 (age 51); Buenos Aires, Argentina
- Occupations: actress, singer
- Years active: 1997–present

Elena Silvia Roger (born 27 October 1974) is an Argentine actress and singer who won the 2009 Laurence Olivier Award for Best Actress in a Musical for her portrayal of Édith Piaf in Piaf. She has also appeared in the West End in Evita, Boeing-Boeing, and Passion.

== Argentine career ==
Prior to being cast as Eva Perón in the West End revival of Evita, Roger was already a performer in her native Buenos Aires. In 1997, she was nominated for the Trinidad Guevara Award as Best Breakthrough Female for her work in Yo Que Tu Me Enamoraba. She went on to appear in several productions including Nine, Houdini, Dracula, the musical, Beauty and the Beast, and Fiddler on the Roof, as well as starring in Les Misérables as Fantine, and Saturday Night Fever as Annette. For the 2002/2003 season, she was nominated for an ACE Award for Best Actress in a Musical for her role in Jazz, Swing, Tap. The following season, she starred in the show, Mina...che cosa sei?, which she co-authored with the show's director, Valeria Ambrosio. Roger won the ACE Award for Best Actress in a Musical for this performance. She has also appeared on several Argentine television programs, including Hombres de Honor, Pensionados, and El sodero de mi vida. Internationally, she briefly toured Europe with Tango por Dos.

== West End career ==
While doing research in Buenos Aires for the 2006 West End revival of Evita, an employee of Andrew Lloyd Webber’s Really Useful Group saw Roger perform and suggested her for the title role of the show. After several rounds of auditions, Roger was cast as Eva Perón and performed the role to critical acclaim.

The Times of London called Roger a "revelation" in the title role of Evita. The Daily Telegraph's praise of Roger's "star performance" was echoed by most other newspapers, including the Evening Standard, which reported that Roger's performance was "ripe for superlatives", and the Sunday Express, which noted her "transfixing presence with more than just a touch of the star quality that she proudly sings of possessing". The Guardian added that Roger "captures all of Eva's iron-willed determination". American reviewers also praised Roger's turn. The Hollywood Reporter opined that Roger "knocks the Argentine socks off the title role" and Variety declared Roger "a triple-threat dynamo".

Roger was nominated for a 2007 Laurence Olivier Award for Best Actress in a Musical for her performance at the Adelphi Theatre but lost the award to Jenna Russell for her performance in Sunday in the Park with George. Roger next appeared on the London stage as Gabriella in the production of Boeing-Boeing, directed by Matthew Warchus at the Comedy Theatre. In 2008, Roger played the title role in the Donmar Warehouse’s production of Piaf and received rave reviews. The show eventually transferred to the larger Vaudeville Theatre, and Roger won the 2009 Laurence Olivier Award for Best Actress in a Musical. She subsequently toured internationally with Piaf including a stop in her hometown of Buenos Aires. During her time back in Buenos Aires, she revived her performance in Mina...che cosa sei? for a brief run. From September 10 through November 21, 2010, Roger starred as Fosca in a revival of the Stephen Sondheim/James Lapine musical Passion for a limited engagement at the Donmar Warehouse. On February 7, 2011, it was announced that Roger was nominated for a Laurence Olivier Award as Best Actress in a Musical for the third time for her work in this role.

== Recordings ==
Roger can be heard on the cast albums of Mina...che cosa sei? and Evita. (2006 London revival and 2012 Broadway revival). She has also recorded two solo albums: Vientos Del Sur and a live album recorded in Buenos Aires entitled Recorriendo el Rock Nacional (Nueva Edi).

== Broadway career ==
On the strength of her reception in London, Roger returned to the role of Eva Perón in a new Broadway revival of Evita with previews beginning in March 2012 and an opening night in April at the Marquis Theatre. The production, based on the 2006 West End revival, was again directed by Michael Grandage and choreographed by Rob Ashford. It also starred Ricky Martin as Che and Broadway veteran Michael Cerveris as Juan Perón. In contrast to the London, New York reviews were mixed.

== Stage roles ==
=== Argentina ===
| Duration | Production | Role |
|---|---|---|
| 1996 | Dracula, the musical (Tour) | Lucy Westenra |
| 1995 | El jorobado de París II | |
| 1998 | Nine | |
| 1998 | Beauty and the Beast | Chica boba |
| 2000 | Les Misérables | Fantine |
| 2001 | Saturday Night Fever | Annette |
| 2002 | Fiddler on the Roof | |
| 2004 | Mina... Che Cosa Sei?!? | |
| 2005 | Houdini, una ilusión musical | Bess |
| 2009/10/2023/24 | Piaf | Edith Piaf |
| 2015 | ¡Ay, Carmela! | Carmela |
| 2016 | LoveMusik | Lotte Lenya |

=== West End ===
| Duration | Production | Role | Theatre | Awards |
|---|---|---|---|---|
| 2006 | Evita | Eva Perón | Adelphi Theatre | Nomination: Laurence Olivier Award for Best Actress in a Musical |
| 2007–2008 | Boeing-Boeing | Gabriella | Harold Pinter Theatre | |
| 2008–2010 | Piaf | Édith Piaf | | Won: Laurence Olivier Award for Best Actress in a Musical |
| 2010 | Passion | Fosca | Donmar Warehouse | Nomination: Laurence Olivier Award for Best Actress in a Musical |

=== Broadway ===
| Duration | Production | Role | Theatre | Awards |
|---|---|---|---|---|
| 2012–2013 | Evita | Eva Perón | Marquis Theatre | |
