= Josie Griffiths =

British actress

Josephine Faith "Josie" Griffiths is a British child actress. She is most known for playing Matilda Wormwood in the Stratford production of Matilda the Musical she shared the role with two other young actresses Adrianna Bertola and Kerry Ingram. However, due to her height she was unable to transfer to the West End production. Griffiths has previously played Jemima Potts in a tour of Chitty Chitty Bang Bang and Marta von Trapp in The Sound of Music. She lives in Dulwich and attended the James Allen's Girls' School, and then Exeter University. She then went on to study Musical Theatre at the Royal Academy of Music.
