= Kathryn Evans =

British stage actress, singer and dancer (born 1955)

- Born: 1955 (age 70–71); London, England, U.K.
- Occupations: Singer; Actress; Dancer
- Spouse: Peter Purves (m. 1982)
- Musical career
- Instrument: Vocals

Kathryn Evans (born 1955 in London, England) is a British stage actress, singer and dancer. She trained at the Royal Ballet School and Arts Educational.

She is well known for being the final actress in London to play the lead role of Eva in the original production of Evita. She later appeared in many West End theatre shows including Anything Goes in 1989–90 as Erma, Aspects of Love in 1993–94 as Rose Vibert, Mack & Mabel in 1995 and The Fix in 1997.

She played Norma Desmond in the West End revival of Sunset Boulevard. She was nominated for an Olivier Award for Best Actress in a Musical for this role. In 2010, she appeared in 42nd Street at the Chichester Festival Theatre in the lead role of Dorothy Brock.

She has been married to television presenter Peter Purves since 1982.
