= Piaf (play) =

1978 play by Pam Gems

Piaf is a play by Pam Gems that focuses on the life and career of French chanteuse Edith Piaf. The biographical drama with music portrays the singer as a self-destructive, promiscuous alcoholic and junkie who, in one controversial scene, urinates in public.

The original production starred Jane Lapotaire in the title role, and included Ian Charleson as Pierre. It premiered in 1978 at Royal Shakespeare Company's The Other Place in Stratford-upon-Avon, after which it moved to the Donmar Warehouse in London, the Aldwych Theatre, the Piccadilly Theatre, and then Wyndham's Theatre, before going to the United States.

In the U.S. the play began in Philadelphia. After six previews the show opened on Broadway at the Plymouth Theatre on February 6, 1981, with Lapotaire returning in the lead. It ran for 165 performances, and Lapotaire won the 1981 Tony Award.

== Later major productions and revivals ==
The play was performed in Argentina from 1983 to 1986 with Virginia Lago in the role of Piaf. Lago won the Premio Estrella de Mar award in 1984 for Best Actress and in 1984 the Prensario Award for Best Actress.

The play was also performed in Brazil in 1983 with Bibi Ferreira in the role of Piaf. Bibi won several awards in 1984 and ran the show for more than 10 years. Nowadays, She sings Piaf in her concerts around the world – including The Lincoln Center – NYC.

A London revival occurred in 1993/94 with Elaine Paige in the role of Piaf. In 1994 the play won the Gold Badge of Merit Award from BASCA. In 1994 Paige gained a nomination for the Olivier Award for Best Actress in a Musical.

The play was performed in Uruguay from 1994 to 1995 with Laura Canoura in the role of Piaf. In 1995 she won the Iris de Plata Award.

Caroline O'Connor starred in the play in Melbourne and Sydney, Australia in 2000 and 2001, gaining three Australian theater awards.

A second revival from 2008 to 2010 had Elena Roger in the title role. In 2009 she won the Laurence Olivier Award for Best Actress in a Musical. This began at The Donmar, before transferring to the Vaudeville Theatre on the Strand. Roger went on to recreate this role in Spain and her native Argentina.

A 2010 production marked the opening of the Ariel Center for the Performing Arts in the illegal Israeli settlement of Ariel in the West Bank. A letter was signed by sixty actors who called for a boycott.

A new production opened at Curve, Leicester in 2013 starring Frances Ruffelle in the lead role. Madalena Alberto was her alternate.

In 2015, to mark Piaf's 100th birthday, a new production opened at the Brighton Fringe, and due to the critical acclaim it subsequently transferred to the Bridewell Theatre and Charing Cross Theatre in London. The actor musician production directed by Jari Laakso starred Cameron Leigh in the title role, supported by Samantha Spurgin as Toine and Valerie Cutko as Marlene. Leigh received a BroadwayWorld Award nomination for her portrayal.

A Japanese production ran from February 24 to March 18, 2022.

== Additional Broadway cast ==
- Zoë Wanamaker ..... Toine
- Peter Friedman ..... "Papa" Leplée
- Judith Ivey ..... Madeleine
- Jean Smart ..... Marlene Dietrich

== Critical reception ==
In his review in The New York Times, Frank Rich observed, "Miss Lapotaire's performance burns with such heartstopping intensity that one never questions her right to stand in for the "little sparrow," who died at age 47 in 1963; one embraces her instantly and totally. While it is far more difficult to embrace Mrs. Gems's rather frail play, I guess we can't have everything. Let's be thankful for Miss Lapotaire . . . Piaf often obeys the dramatic cliches of rags-to-riches-to-rags showbiz sagas. Like an old movie biography, Mrs. Gems's play unfolds in snippets in which minor characters . . . whip by to deliver information . . . or to act out, in absurd shorthand, famous events in the subject's life . . . Instead of raising substantive issues about Piaf, the evening's cartoonish archetypes call the playwright's craft into question . . . These sketchy people just grease the narrative skids and kill too much time. Singly, they may be innocuous, but collectively they become a dead weight around the play's neck . . . Mrs. Gems also relies on that tired device of following most of Piaf's heartbreaks with songs that comment directly on the action. This might work if the songs were Piaf's best, but the ones here are generally lesser-known numbers that seem intended to minimize invidious comparisons between Miss Lapotaire's voice and her character's."

== Awards and nominations ==
Jane Lapotaire won the Tony Award for Best Performance by a Leading Actress in a Play. Zoë Wanamaker was nominated for the Tony Award for Best Performance by a Featured Actress in a Play and the Drama Desk Award for Outstanding Featured Actress in a Play. In 1984 Virginia Lago won the Sea Star Award for Best Actress and in 1984 Prensario Award for Best Actress. In 1994 Elaine Paige won the Gold Badge of Merit Award from BASCA and in 1994 a nomination for the Olivier Award - Best Actress in a Musical. In 1995 Laura Canoura won the Iris de Plata Award. In 2009 Elena Roger won the Laurence Olivier Award for Best Actress in a Musical.
