= Eleanor Worthington-Cox =

British actress from Merseyside

Eleanor Worthington Cox
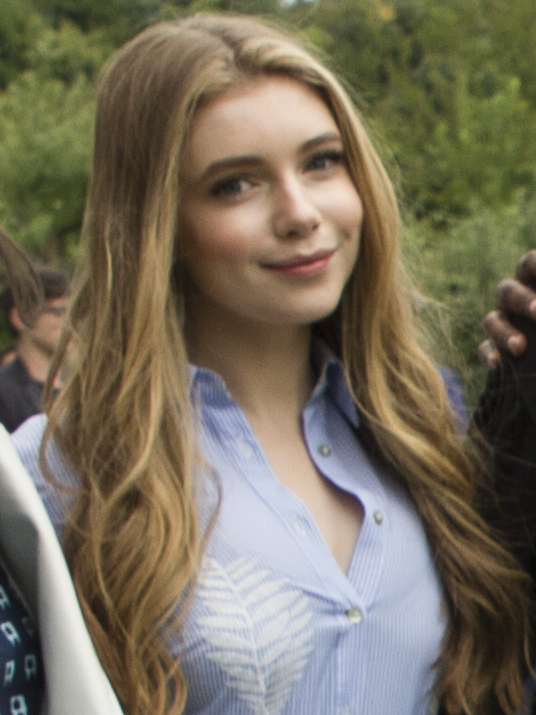
- Cox in September 2018
- Born: Eleanor Winifred Worthington Cox; 21 June 2001 (age 25); Merseyside, England, UK
- Occupation: Actress
- Years active: 2011–present
- Known for: Matilda the Musical; The Enfield Haunting; Next to Normal

Eleanor Winifred Worthington Cox (born 21 June 2001) is an English actress from Merseyside best known for portraying Matilda Wormwood in Matilda the Musical. Eleanor won a 2012 Laurence Olivier Award for Best Actress in a Leading Role in a Musical along with the three other child actresses playing Matilda: Cleo Demetriou, Kerry Ingram, and Sophia Kiely. Upon winning, 10-year-old Eleanor became the youngest Olivier Award winner in any category at the time. She received a nomination for a British Academy Television Award for playing Janet Hodgson in The Enfield Haunting. She is also known for portraying Polly Renfrew in the CBBC TV adaptation of Jacqueline Wilson's Hetty Feather and Cait in the Sky Atlantic series Britannia.

== Biography ==
From 2003, at the age of two, until 2012, Worthington Cox trained at the Formby School of Performing Arts.

Before starring in Matilda, Worthington Cox was in the chorus for a Bill Kenwright production of Joseph and the Amazing Technicolor Dreamcoat at the Liverpool Empire.

In September 2011, Worthington Cox was announced as one of four girls who would be playing the lead role of Matilda in Matilda the Musical along with: Cleo Demetriou; Kerry Ingram; and Sophia Kiely. She made her debut in October 2011 and performed in the show two nights a week. It was a critical success, and Matilda was nominated for 10 Olivier awards. Among the nominations was Best Actress in a Musical, for which Demetriou, Ingram, Kiely, and Cox were all nominated. On awards night, Matilda won seven out of the ten nominations. Cox won Best Actress in a Musical along with her co-stars and currently holds the record for the youngest winner of an Olivier award.

Worthington Cox continued to appear in Matilda until 19 August 2012, later sharing the role with Demetriou, Hayley Canham, Jade Marner, and Isobelle Molloy.

In May 2013, Worthington Cox played Scout in a stage production of To Kill a Mockingbird at Regent's Park Open Air Theatre, sharing her role with Lucy Hutchinson and Izzy Lee.

After finishing Matilda, Worthington Cox filmed the role of Young Princess Aurora in the film Maleficent (2014).

From April to August 2015, Worthington Cox played the role of Blousey Brown in a production of Bugsy Malone at the Lyric Hammersmith. This was the debut production following the theatre's reopening after a £16.5 million redevelopment project.

In October 2015, Worthington Cox played Jess in Tomcat, a new play by James Rushbrooke, at Southwark Playhouse, London.

In 2016, Worthington Cox received a British Academy Television Award nomination for her performance in the Sky One mini-series The Enfield Haunting. She was also featured as one of Screen International's "Stars of Tomorrow", the film magazine's annual showcase highlighting outstanding young actors from the UK and Ireland.

In 2018, Worthington Cox starred as Cait in Britannia.

In 2018 played “Boogie” in comedy film “Action Point”

== Acting credits ==
=== Film ===
Year	Title	Role	Notes	Ref(s)
2014	Maleficent	Young Princess Aurora		
2018	Action Point	Boogie Carver		
2019	Gwen	Gwen		
2025	Next to Normal	Natalie Goodman	Filmed recording of 2024 West End production	
2026	About a Bell †	Bryony	Post-production	

=== Television ===
Year	Title	Role	Notes	Ref(s)
2015	Cucumber	Molly Whitaker	Main cast	
2015	The Enfield Haunting	Janet Hodgson	Main cast Nominated – British Academy Television Award for Best Supporting Actress	
2015–2016	Hetty Feather	Polly Renfrew	Main cast (season 1, first two episodes season 2)	
2018–2021	Britannia	Cait	Main cast	
2021	The Irregulars	Clara	1 episode	

=== Theatre ===
Year	Production	Role	Notes	Ref(s)
2009	Joseph and the Amazing Technicolor Dreamcoat	Chorus	Liverpool Empire	
2011	Matilda the Musical	Matilda Wormwood	Cambridge Theatre; 25 October 2011 – 19 August 2012	
2013	To Kill a Mockingbird	Jean Louise "Scout" Finch	Regent's Park Open Air Theatre; 16 May – 15 June 2013	
2015	Bugsy Malone	Blousey Brown	Lyric Hammersmith; 11 April 2015 – 1 August 2015	
2015	Tomcat	Jess	Southwark Playhouse; 28 October 2015 – 21 November 2015	
2022	Jerusalem	Phaedra Cox	Apollo Theatre; 16 April 2022 – 10 August 2022	
2023	The Secret Life of Bees	Lily	Almeida Theatre; 8 April 2023 – 27 May 2023	
2023–2024	Next to Normal	Natalie Goodman	Donmar Warehouse; 14 August 2023 - 7 October 2023 Wyndham’s Theatre 18 June 2024 - 21 September 2024	
2024–2025	The Little Foxes	Alexandra Giddens	Young Vic 2 December 2024 - 8 February 2025	
2025	Much Ado About Nothing	Hero	Royal Shakespeare Theatre (Royal Shakespeare Company) 12 April 2025 - 24 May 2025	
2025	Mary Page Marlowe	Mary Page Marlowe	The Old Vic 23 September 2025 - 1 November 2025	
2026	Please Please Me	Cynthia/Cilla	Kiln Theatre 16 April 2026 - 29 May 2026	

== Accolades ==
Year	Award	Category	Work	Result	Ref(s)
2012	WhatsOnStage.com Awards	Best Actress in a Leading Role in a Musical (shared with Cleo Demetriou, Kerry Ingram and Sophia Kiely)	Matilda the Musical	Nominated	
2012	Laurence Olivier Award	Best Actress in a Leading Role in a Musical (shared with Cleo Demetriou, Kerry Ingram and Sophia Kiely)	Matilda the Musical	Won	
2016	British Academy Television Awards	Best Actress in a Supporting Role	The Enfield Haunting	Nominated	
2024	Laurence Olivier Award	Best Actress in a Supporting Role In a Musical	Next to Normal	Nominated	

== See also ==
- List of British actors

== Bibliography ==
- Sonia Friedman Productions Limited (2022). Jerusalem: Cast & Creative. Retrieved from Cast & Creative.
