= Matilda the Musical =

2011 musical by Tim Minchin and Dennis Kelly

Roald Dahl's Matilda
- The Musical
- West End promotional poster
- Music: Tim Minchin
- Lyrics: Tim Minchin
- Book: Dennis Kelly
- Basis: Matilda by Roald Dahl
- Premiere: 9 December 2010: Courtyard Theatre, Stratford-upon-Avon
- Productions: 2010 Stratford-upon-Avon; 2011 West End; 2013 Broadway; 2015 US tour; 2018 UK tour; 2025 UK tour
- Awards: Critics' Circle Theatre Award for Best Musical; UK Theatre Award for Best Musical Production; Laurence Olivier Award for Best New Musical; New York Drama Critics' Circle for Best Musical; Drama Desk Award for Outstanding Musical; Tony Award for Best Book of a Musical

Roald Dahl's Matilda, also known simply as Matilda and Matilda the Musical, is a musical with music and lyrics by Tim Minchin and a book by Dennis Kelly. It is based on the 1988 novel Matilda by Roald Dahl. The musical's narrative centres on Matilda Wormwood, a precocious five-year-old girl with the gift of telekinesis, who loves reading, overcomes obstacles caused by her family and school, and helps her teacher to reclaim her life. After a twelve-week trial run staged by the Royal Shakespeare Company (RSC) at Stratford-upon-Avon from November 2010 to January 2011, it received its West End premiere on 24 November 2011 at the Cambridge Theatre and its Broadway premiere on 11 April 2013 at the Shubert Theatre.

Matilda the Musical has received widespread critical acclaim and box-office popularity, winning seven 2012 Olivier Awards, including Best New Musical—at the time, the highest number of such awards ever won by a single show. Cleo Demetriou, Kerry Ingram, Eleanor Worthington-Cox and Sophia Kiely shared a Laurence Olivier Award for Best Actress in a Leading Role in a Musical. Ten-year-old Worthington-Cox became the youngest winner of the award in any category. At the 2013 Tony Awards, the show won five awards, including the Tony Award for Best Book of a Musical for Dennis Kelly.

A film adaptation was released on 25 November 2022 in the United Kingdom by TriStar Pictures, followed by the United States on 25 December 2022 on Netflix.

== Background ==
In 1988, British children's author Roald Dahl wrote the original novel Matilda, illustrated by Quentin Blake, about a young intelligent girl who develops a love of reading despite her abusive parents and headmistress of her school, incorporating rebellion and magical powers. The novel was adapted into a 1996 American film directed by Danny DeVito as well as an audio reading by Kate Winslet and a BBC Radio 4 programme narrated by Lenny Henry.

In December 2009, the Royal Shakespeare Company announced its intention to stage a musical adaptation with direction by Matthew Warchus and adaptation by Dennis Kelly. Musician and comedian Tim Minchin was chosen to write music and lyrics after Warchus saw his 2009 tour Ready for This? and persuaded during the encore song "White Wine in the Sun". It was also revealed comedian and musician Bill Bailey had been asked to write the songs, however turned the project down due to other works. Coincidentally, Minchin revealed that he had originally attempted to gain permission from the Dahl estate to stage a musical adaptation in the early 2000s when writing for a local youth theatre in Perth, Western Australia.

== Productions ==
=== Stratford-upon-Avon (2010–11) ===
In 2009, the Royal Shakespeare Company announced its intent to stage a musical adaptation of the story Matilda, engaging Dennis Kelly as playwright, Tim Minchin as the composer and lyricist, Matthew Warchus as director, Chris Nightingale as orchestrator and music supervision, Rob Howell as set designer and Paul Kieve as illusionist and special effects creator. Originally titled Matilda, A Musical, the show opened at the Courtyard Theatre, Stratford-upon-Avon, England on 9 December 2010, following previews from 9 November. The production was choreographed by Peter Darling. Bertie Carvel played the infamous Miss Trunchbull, with Paul Kaye and Josie Walker as Matilda's parents, Mr. and Mrs. Wormwood, and Lauren Ward as Matilda's angelic teacher, Miss Honey. Three young actresses, Adrianna Bertola, Josie Griffiths and Kerry Ingram, alternated in the title role. The show ended its premiere engagement on 30 January 2011.

=== London (2011–present) ===
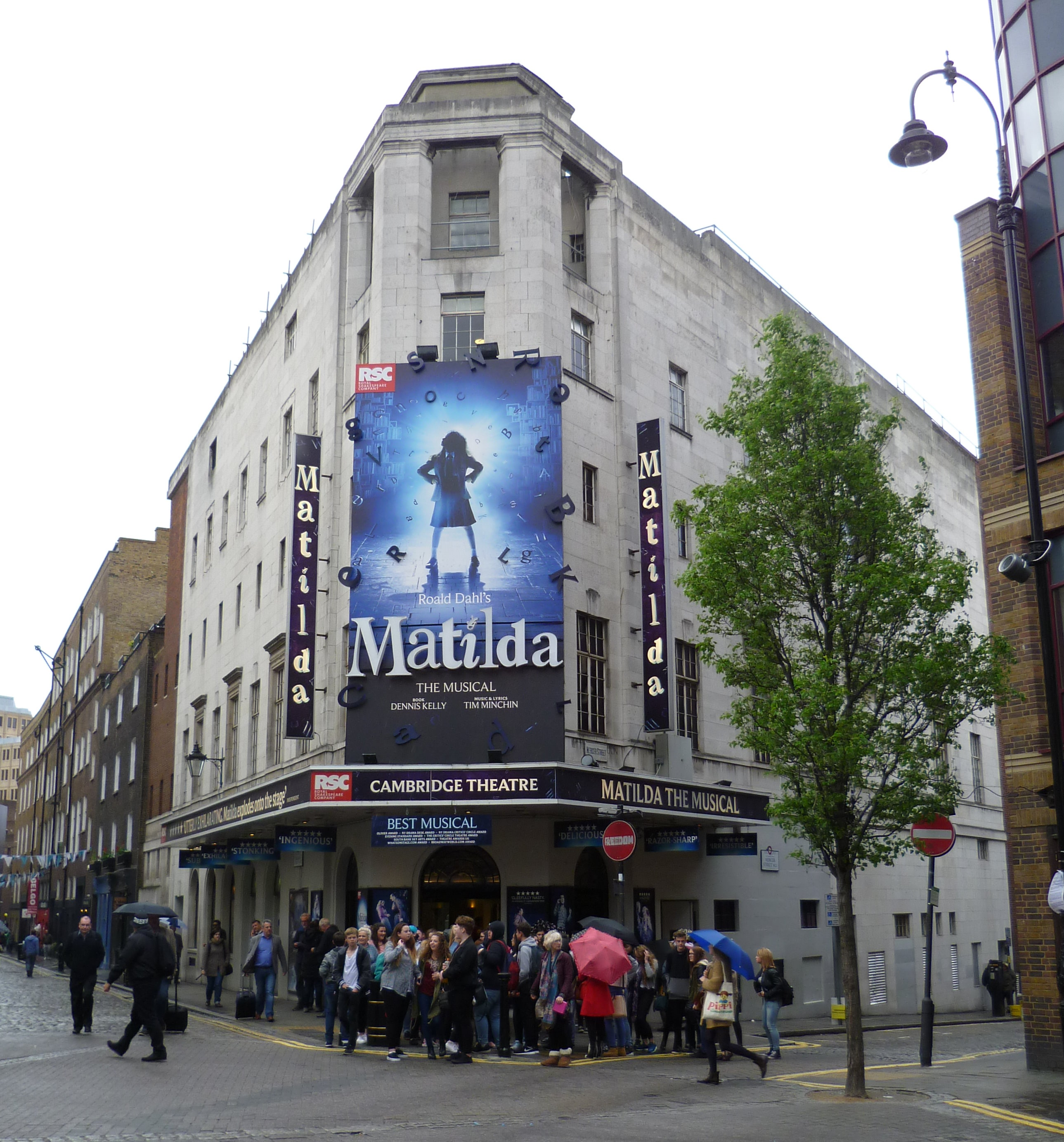
Since 2011, Matilda the Musical has been playing at the Cambridge Theatre in London's West End.

In 2011, the musical received its West End debut (under the new title of Matilda the Musical) at London's Cambridge Theatre. The show was originally scheduled to begin previews on 18 October 2011, but because of structural and installation work at the theatre, the start of the performances was delayed until 25 October. The opening night was postponed from 22 to 24 November. The musical opened in London to uniformly positive reviews; Kaye and Carvel received high praise for their performances. Many of the principal adult cast from the Stratford run reprised their roles in London. Eleanor Worthington-Cox, Cleo Demetriou, Sophia Kiely and Kerry Ingram—the only one to reprise her role from Stratford at this time—starred in the title role.

In October 2011, Matilda won Best Musical and Best Actor (Bertie Carvel) in the UK Theatre Awards, and in November 2011 it won the Ned Sherrin Award for Best Musical as part of The Evening Standard Theatre Awards. The production was nominated in all 10 categories for which it was eligible at the 2012 Olivier Awards. The four Matildas performed "Naughty" at the awards show. Matilda won 7 Oliviers: Best New Musical, Best Director (Warchus), Best Actor in a Musical (Carvel), Best Actress in a Musical (accepted by four Matildas), Best Theatre Choreographer (Darling), Best Set Design (Howell) and Best Sound Design (Baker). This was a record number for any show in the event's 36-year history.

On 16 March 2020, due to the COVID-19 pandemic, the show suspended performances, returning to the Cambridge Theatre from 16 September 2021. On 12 November 2021, a 10th anniversary performance celebrated 10 years since the show opened in the West End which featured a pre-show speech by Kelly and Minchin with many of the creatives and previous cast in attendance, including 42 previous Matildas. The production celebrated its 5,000th performance in April 2025.

=== Broadway (2013–17) ===
On 29 February 2012, the RSC announced the show would transfer to Broadway in spring 2013; it would still be set in England despite initial pressure for the show to be Americanised. On 19 July 2012, it was announced that the show would open on 11 April 2013 at the Shubert Theatre, with previews commencing on 4 March 2013. Bertie Carvel and Lauren Ward reprised their roles as Miss Trunchbull and Miss Honey. Ted Wilson also continued as Eric. A four-girl cast consisting of Sophia Gennusa, Oona Laurence, Bailey Ryon, and Milly Shapiro shared the titular role of Matilda.

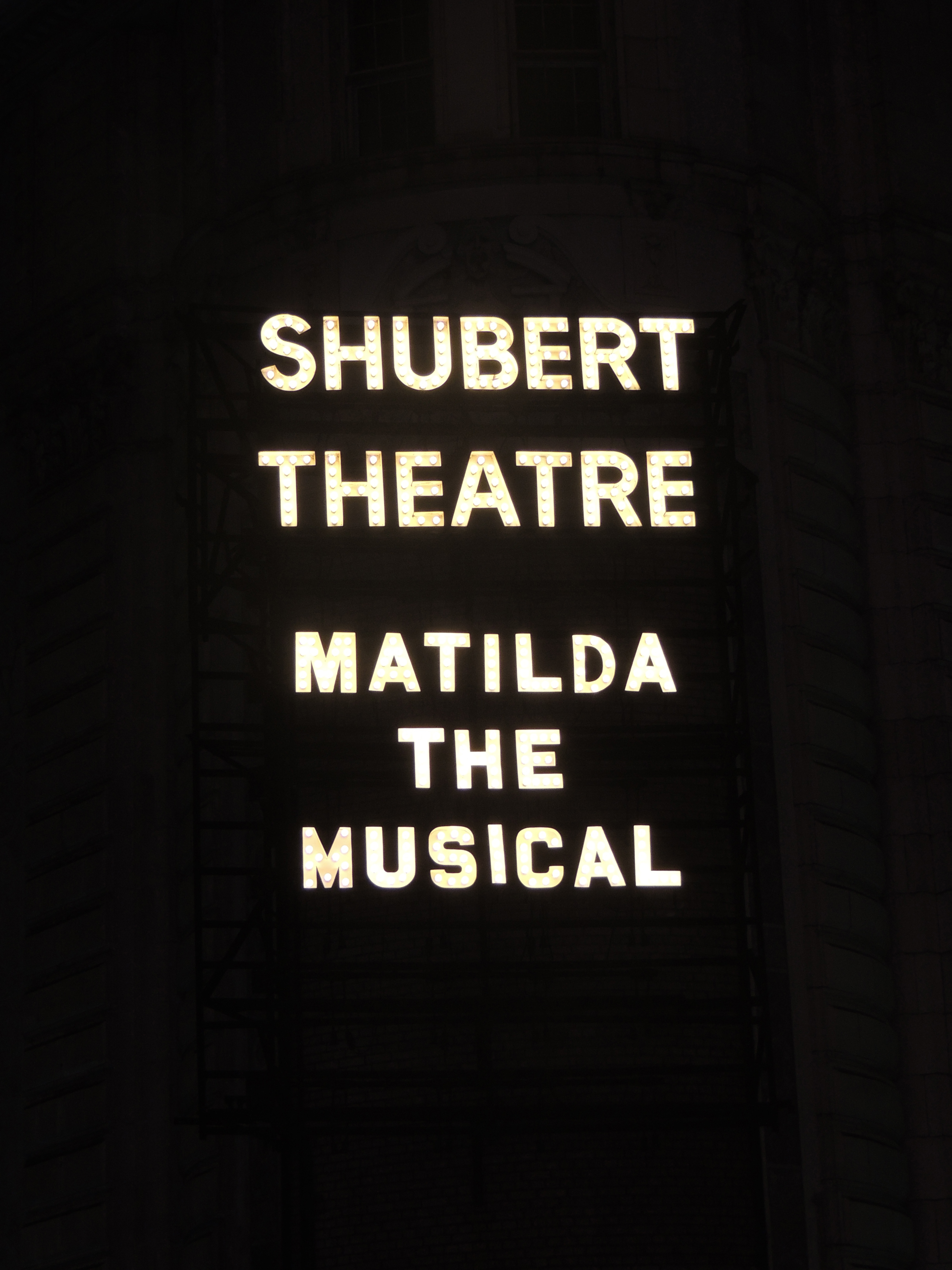
Matilda the Musical marquee at the Shubert Theatre

The transfer cost US$16 million to produce; it opened as planned on 11 April 2013, with Sophia Gennusa playing the leading role. Small changes were made from the London production; some lyrics were changed to suit American audiences, and more scenes used the orchestra pit/front stalls area of the theatre. The Broadway production also introduced an overture and pre-show curtain, as of June 2013. The Broadway production closed on 1 January 2017 after 1,555 performances.

=== US national tour (2015–17) ===
On 1 June 2013, Tim Minchin announced during an interview that the show was preparing for a US national tour. Minchin said, "We just got it up in New York, there's a touring version that is meant to be going on in America...". Once again produced by the Royal Shakespeare Company and The Dodgers, the tour began technical rehearsals and performances in May 2015 at the Shubert Theatre in New Haven, Connecticut, before its official launch on 7 June at the Ahmanson Theatre in Los Angeles, California. Announced stops included the SHN Orpheum Theatre in San Francisco, California, the 5th Avenue Theatre in Seattle, Washington, the AT&T Performing Arts Center in Dallas, Texas, the Kennedy Center Opera House in Washington, D.C., and the Straz Center for the Performing Arts in Tampa, Florida. The cast was announced on 21 April 2015. Three girls would alternate in the lead role: Mia Sinclair Jenness, Gabby Gutierrez, and Mabel Tyler. Gutierrez and Tyler made their tour debuts; Jenness had appeared in the original Broadway cast and 25th anniversary tour of Les Misérables. Other principal cast members included Jennifer Blood as Miss Honey, Bryce Ryness as Miss Trunchbull, and Quinn Mattfeld and Cassie Silva as Mr. and Mrs. Wormwood.

The national tour of Matilda had its first official performance on 7 June 2015 at the Ahmanson Theatre in Los Angeles, California. Mia Sinclair Jenness played the title role. The US national tour ended on 25 June 2017 at the Chapman Music Hall in Tulsa, Oklahoma.

=== Australian and New Zealand tour (2015–17) ===
Sydney: In July 2013, Minchin said that an Australian production was planned for 2015. The production, produced by Louise Withers, had preview performances from 28 July before opening at the Sydney Lyric theatre on 20 August 2015. The ticketing release date (October 2014) was announced at Pier 2/3 in Walsh Bay, with Minchin, International Executive Producer André Ptaszynski, NSW Deputy Premier Andrew Stoner and Sydney press in attendance. The cast included Marika Aubrey and Daniel Frederiksen as Mr. and Mrs. Wormwood, Elise McCann as Miss Honey and James Millar as Miss Trunchbull. Sasha Rose (12), Georgia Taplin (11), Molly Barwick (10) and Bella Thomas (13) shared the title role with Thomas playing Matilda on the opening night. The Sydney season ended on Sunday 29 February with Georgia Taplin playing the title role, before transferring to Melbourne.

Melbourne: For the Melbourne season, Dusty Bursill, Alannah Parfett, Tiana Mirra and Ingrid Torelli were announced to rotate playing the title role. On 3 January, Sydney Matilda Bella Thomas was injured and Parfett began her run early in Sydney, covering Thomas until she was better and joining the girls in a rotation until the end of the Sydney run. Mirra and Torelli made their debuts in Sydney's final week on 24 and 27 February respectively. The show opened at Melbourne's Princess Theatre on 13 March and was extended to perform until 11 November 2016. Some of the Sydney child cast members reprised their roles for selected performances in Melbourne; for example, certain performances featured Molly Barwick as Matilda.

Brisbane, Perth, Adelaide and Auckland: A new season was announced to start in Brisbane, Perth, Adelaide, and Auckland. Izellah Connelly, Annabella Cowley, Venice Harris, Eva Murawski rotated the leading role of Matilda. The Matilda tour continued on to Brisbane from 25 November 2016 to 12 February 2017 at the Queensland Performing Arts Centre (QPAC) before moving on to perform at the Crown Theatre in Perth from 28 February until 7 May 2017 and from 21 May to 16 July 2017 at the Adelaide Festival Theatre in South Australia. The show ran in at the Civic Theatre in Auckland until 22 October 2017. Lucy Maunder was initially scheduled to take on the role of Miss Honey from McCann beginning the Brisbane leg. However, due to Maunder's pregnancy, the transition was postponed until 20 March 2017 midway through the Perth leg.

=== Toronto (2016–17) ===
After the successful launches of Once and the Tony Award-winning Kinky Boots, Mirvish Productions chose to open a Canadian production of Matilda the Musical. The company opened at the Ed Mirvish Theatre beginning in July 2016, closing on 7 January 2017. Hannah Levinson, Jenna Weir, and Jaime MacLean rotated playing the title role. On 8 October 2016, Canadian Prime Minister Justin Trudeau and family attended a performance.

=== UK and Ireland tour (2018–19) ===
On 11 April 2017, a tour was announced to begin at Curve, Leicester from 5–24 March 2018 before touring to Bord Gáis Energy Theatre, Dublin (4–28 April), Sunderland Empire (8 May - 2 June), Milton Keynes Theatre (5–30 June), Birmingham Hippodrome (3 July – 8 September), Manchester Palace Theatre (18 September – 24 November) and Wales Millennium Centre, Cardiff (4 December - 12 January 2019), Theatre Royal, Plymouth (15 January - 16 February), the Alhambra Theatre, Bradford (19 February – 23 March), Edinburgh Playhouse (2–27 April), the Bristol Hippodrome (7 May - 8 June), Southampton Mayflower (11 June – 6 July) and Norwich Theatre Royal (16 July – 17 August).

On 17 October 2017, the adult cast was announced, to include Craige Els as Miss Trunchbull, Carly Thoms as Miss Honey, Sebastien Torkia as Mr. Wormwood and Rebecca Thornhill as Mrs. Wormwood. On 16 January 2018, the children's cast was announced, with the role of Matilda being shared between Annalise Bradbury, Lara Cohen, Poppy Jones and Nicola Turner. The tour officially opened as scheduled on 5 March 2018 at the Curve theatre in Leicester, with Poppy Jones in the title role on opening night.

=== Philippines (2017) ===
Matilda had its Asian premiere in the Philippines on 10 November 2017. The production closed on 10 December 2017. This production was the first licensed production; it was not produced by the Royal Shakespeare Company, and has no links to the original production except for the score and script. The show featured Esang de Torres, Uma Martin, and Felicity Kyle Napuli alternating the title role, with Esang playing the role on opening night. The Manila production also had a 16-child strong cast alternating 8 other student roles, namely Gabrielle Aerin Ong and Maria Ericka Peralejo as Lavender; Denise Fidel Arteta and Chi Chi Tan as Amanda; Nicole (now Nic) Chien and Ella Gonzalez as Alice; Alba Berenguer-Testa and Chantel Marie Guinid as Hortensia; Josh Nubla and Miguel Suarez as Bruce; Rhythm Alexander and Ian Albert Magallona as Eric; Gabo Tiongson and Pablo Miguel Palacpac as Nigel; and John Joseph Miraflores and Teddy Velasco as Tommy.

=== US regional productions (2018–19) ===
In 2018, a small number of major regional theaters produced Matilda. Walnut Street Theatre's production of Matilda was the first regional production after the show closed down on Broadway. Philadelphia's Walnut Street Theatre produced Matilda with performances beginning on 6 November 2018 for a total run of 4 months through 2019. Matilda was played by Jemma Bleu Greenbaum and Ellie Biron.

=== Korea (2018–19, 2022–23) ===
In July 2017, Seensee Company announced they would be producing a production of Matilda the Musical in September 2018. The production will be in arrangement with the RSC and be the first non-English version of Matilda. The company includes a cast consisting of four girls, named Li Ji Na, An So Myeong, Hwang Ye Yeong, and Seol Ga Eun that will rotate in the title role of Matilda, as well as a 16-member child cast that will play the roles of Matilda's classmates. The production opened their preview show on 8 September 2018, with An So Myeong in the title role. Li Ji Na and Seol Ga Eun played their first performances on 9 September, and Hwang Ye Yeong had first debut as Matilda on 14 September. A 12 September press call included a performance of Naughty by Hwang Ye Young, Quiet by Seol Ga Eun, a performance of Revolting Children, and more. The production officially closed on 10 February 2019, with Hwang Ye Yeong playing the title role.

In April 2020, Seensee Company announced they will be running another production of Matilda the Musical from October 2022 to January 2023, in Daesung D Cube Art Center. The cast includes four girls playing Matilda (Lim Ha Yun, Jin Yeon Woo, Choi Eun Yeong, Ha Sin Bi), a 16-member child cast, and a 26-member adult cast. The production opened their preview show on 5 October 2022.

=== International tour (2018–20, 2023) ===
South Africa: An international tour began at the Teatro At Montecasino in Johannesburg from 17 October to 2 December 2018, before running at the Artscape Opera House in Cape Town from 11 December 2018 to 13 January 2019. The tour cast was announced on 28 August 2018 Lilla Fleischmann, Kitty Harris, and Morgan Santo in the role of Matilda. Other cast members include Ryan de Villers as Miss Trunchbull, Bethany Dickson as Miss Honey, Stephen Jubber and Claire Taylor as Mr. and Mrs. Wormwood, and Nonpumelelo Mayiyane as Mrs. Phelps. Matilda's classmates are played by Jack Fokkens, Keeran Isaacs, Robyn Ivey, Joshua LeClair, Levi Maron, Ipeleng Merafe, Megan Saayman, Taylor Salgado, Cameron Seear and Zac Gabriel Werb. The rest of the adult ensemble includes Jasmin Colangelo, Katrina Dix, Londiwe Dhlomo-Dlamini, Sinead Donnelly, Michael Gardiner, Kent Jeycocke, Weslee Lauder, Carlo McFarlane, Kenneth Meyer, Daniel Parrott, Adrianna Patlaszynska, Jonathan Raath, and Logan Timbr.

Singapore: Following the South African runs, the international tour began a run at the Sands Theater at Marina Bay Sands. At this time, Sofia Poston joined the show as Matilda. She will rotate along with Fleischmann, Harris, and Santo. Poston had her debut on the tour's opening night in Singapore. The tour will perform there from 21 February to 17 March 2019.

China: Following the Singaporean runs, the international tour ran across 13 cities in China from June 2019 to January 2020.

Philippines: The Manila leg of the international tour at The Theater at Solaire at Solaire Resort & Casino, ran from 5 March and ended early on 13 March 2020 due to the fears of coronavirus in the country, it was supposed to end on 25 March 2020. Zara Yazbek Polito, Sofia Poston, and Zoe Modlinne will rotate in the title role. Haley Flaherty and Hayden Tee will reprise their West End roles as Miss Honey and Miss Trunchbull. The cast also includes Stephen Jubber as Mr. Wormwood, Matthew Leck as Bruce Bogtrotter, Claire Taylor as Mrs. Wormwood, and Nompumelelo Mayiyane as Mrs. Phelps.

Israel: In August 2023, the tour reopened at the Tel Aviv Opera House. Originally scheduled to run from 7 August to 22 August, it was then extended to 26 August due to demand. The tour cast was announced on 27 July 2023 with Donna Craig, Myla Williams, and Yolani Balfour in the role of Matilda. Other cast members include Ryan de Villers and James Wolstenholme as Miss Trunchbull, Carly Thoms, Gemma Scholes and Gina Beck as Miss Honey, Matthew Rowland as Mr. Wormwood, Emily Squibb as Mrs. Wormwood, and Londiwe Dhlomo-Dlamini as Mrs. Phelps.

=== Spanish-speaking countries (2022–24) ===
Spain: On 13 October 2022, the first Spanish-language production opened at the Nuevo Teatro Alcalá in Madrid, Spain. The production ended its run on 18 February 2024 after more than 500 performances. The production starred Julia Awad, Daniela Berezo and Valentina Cachimbo, Laura Centella, Julieta Cruz, Otilia M. Domínguez and Rocío Zarraute as Matilda, Oriol Burés and Daniel Orgaz as Miss Trunchbull, Allende Blanco as Miss Honey, Héctor Carballo as Mr. Wormwood and Mary Capel as Mrs. Wormwood.

Argentina: From 1 June to 30 July 2023, a production opened at the Teatro Gran Rex in Buenos Aires, Argentina. It reopened from 12 January to 13 February 2024 with the same cast and staff, with more than 100 performances shown between both runs. The production starred Catalina Picone, Isabella Sorrentino and Victoria Vidal as Matilda, Agustín Aristarán as Miss Trunchbull, Laurita Fernández as Miss Honey, José María Listorti as Mr. Wormwood and Fernanda Metilli as Mrs. Wormwood.

Mexico: On 13 March 2026, a production opened in Mexico City, Mexico, with Jaime Camil starring as Miss Trunchbull. The production ended its run on 21 June 2026 to make space for a limited-run production of Hoy No Me Puedo Levantar on its 20th Anniversary and a national tour across Mexico, before returning for a second season due to its popularity.

=== Japan (2023) ===
In June 2022, HoriPro announced that a Japanese version of Matilda would be performed at Tokyu Theatre Orb in Tokyo, Japan starting from Spring 2023. The cast includes Sakura Kamura, Minori Kumano, Miran Terada and Nonoka Mikami sharing the role of Matilda as well as Yusuke Onuki, Ryunosuke Onoda and Tatsunari Kimura alternating as Miss Agatha Trunchbull, Miyu Sakihi and Natsumi Kon alternating as Miss Jennifer Honey, Mario Tashiro and Tsukasa Saito (from Trendy Angel) alternating as Mr. Wormwood, Hiromu Kiriya and Chihiro Otsuka alternating as Mrs. Wormwood and Mayumi Oka and Yukiko Ikeda alternating as Mrs. Phelps.

=== UK and Ireland tour (2025–27) ===
A second UK and Ireland tour opened at the Curve, Leicester on 6 October 2025 and will tour until 17 January 2027 at the Wales Millennium Centre, Cardiff.

- Alhambra Theatre, Bradford (30 October - 23 November 2025)
- Liverpool Empire (2 December 2025 - 4 January 2026)
- Plymouth Theatre Royal (13 January - 7 February 2026)
- Sunderland Empire (11 - 28 February 2026)
- Edinburgh Playhouse (4 - 22 March 2026)
- Manchester Palace (26 March - 25 April 2026)
- Mayflower Theatre, Southampton (29 April - 17 May 2026)
- Bristol Hippodrome (2 - 27 June 2026)
- Birmingham Hippodrome (1 July - 2 August 2026)
- Norwich Theatre Royal (6 August - 6 September 2026)
- Bord Gáis Energy Theatre, Dublin (15 September - 18 October 2026)
- Milton Keynes Theatre (28 October - 14 November 2026)
- Theatre Royal Glasgow (18 November - 5 December 2026),
- Wales Millennium Centre, Cardiff - (9 December 2026 - 17 January 2027)

The adult cast includes Richard Hurst as Miss Trunchbull, Tessa Kadler as Miss Honey, Adam Stafford as Mr. Wormwood and Rebecca Thornhill as Mrs. Wormwood. Madison Davis, Mollie Hutton, Olivia Ironmonger and Sanna Kurihara shares the title role of Matilda.

=== German-speaking countries (2025-27) ===
Austria: Stadttheater Baden close to Vienna launched the first German-speaking production, starring Tamaki Uchida, Mia-Leigh Botha and Liv Perman as Matilda Wormwood, Ann Mandrella as Mrs. Wormwood, Boris Pfeifer as Mr. Wormwood, Anna Rosa Döller as Miss Honey and Andreas Lichtenberger as Miss Trunchbull. Premiere performance took place on December 12, 2025 and it ended after 15 performances on February 14, 2026.

From September 11, 2026 until March 28, 2027 Matilda - The Musical is performed at Musiktheater Linz. Cast includes Leonie Cydlik, Valerie Kloiber and Ines Röbl as Matilda Wormwood, Astrid Nowak as Mrs. Wormwood, David Rodriguez-Yanez as Mr. Wormwood, Patrizia Unger as Miss Honey and Gernot Romic as Miss Trunchbull.

== Synopsis ==
=== Act I ===
Mrs. Wormwood gives birth to Matilda, but the new mother is only worried about a ballroom dancing contest she has missed. Similarly shallow, Mr. Wormwood—a used-car salesman and scam artist dismisses the child when he realizes she is a girl ("Miracle"). Five years later, Matilda is an avid reader and lives unhappily with her parents and her older brother Michael. The Wormwoods are oblivious to her genius and frequently mock and verbally abuse her. They prefer to watch TV over reading. Matilda adds some of her mother's peroxide to her father's hair oil, leaving Mr. Wormwood with bright green hair ("Naughty").

At the library, Matilda spends time with the kind librarian Mrs. Phelps and makes up a story about a world famous acrobat and escapologist who cannot have children. Out of despair, the couple decide to put on a show containing a very dangerous act ("Once Upon a Time"). Matilda has her first day at school ("School Song"). Her teacher Miss Honey instantly sees that Matilda is exceptionally intelligent and decides to request that Matilda be moved to the top class ("Pathetic"). However, the child-hating and tyrannical headmistress Miss Trunchbull dismisses Miss Honey's suggestion. Miss Trunchbull explains that Matilda is better off in Miss Honey's class. Miss Trunchbull doesn't feel that Matilda is ready to be in the top class. ("The Hammer")

Matilda's father takes out his career frustration on Matilda, so she puts superglue around the rim of his hat. At school, Matilda is told of Miss Trunchbull's cruel punishments, including The Chokey: a tiny cupboard lined with sharp objects in which she locks disobedient children for hours ("The Chokey Chant"). After Matilda meets her best friend Lavender and saves their friend Nigel from Miss Truncbhull when he's accused of putting syrup on her chair, Miss Trunchubll throws their classmate Amanda Thripp over the fence by her hair as punishment for wearing pigtails. Later, Miss Honey meets Mrs. Wormwood and her dance partner Rudolpho. Mrs. Wormwood mocks Matilda's interest in books and intellect ("Loud"). Miss Honey is desperate to help Matilda but feels powerless to do so ("This Little Girl").

Continuing her story, Matilda explains that the escapologist announces that their act is canceled because the acrobat is pregnant, but her sister refuses to cancel the show and refund tickets, and produces a contract legally binding them to perform the act or go to prison ("The Great Day Arrived"). At school, Miss Trunchbull attempts to accuse Matilda of eating a chocolate cake she had been saving, but quickly learns that the student who ate the cake was Bruce Bogtrotter. As punishment, she forces him to eat an entire chocolate cake as the rest of the students watch him, half of them anticipating that he'll eat the entire cake, while the others are doubtful ("Bruce"). Even though Bruce manages to finish the entire cake, Miss Trunchbull still sends him to The Chokey.

=== Act II ===
Mr. Wormwood advises the audience against reading in favour of watching television ("Telly"). Matilda's classmates sing about their hopes for the future ("When I Grow Up"). Matilda tells Mrs. Phelps more of the story of the acrobat and the escapologist. Legally bound by their contract, they perform their act. The acrobat is fatally injured, living just long enough to give birth to a girl. The acrobat asks her husband to take care of their daughter and love her. After giving birth, the acrobat dies from her injuries. The escapologist invites the acrobat's sister to move in and look after his daughter. The girl's aunt is secretly cruel to her niece. The aunt blames the girl for her sister's death ("The Trick Started Well").

Mr. Wormwood is pleased because he tricked his Russian customers ("I'm So Clever"). Matilda scolds him, so he locks her in her bedroom. Matilda continues the story of the acrobat and escapologist's daughter. The aunt locks her in the cellar, where the father finds her crying. Filled with rage, he goes to confront the aunt but is never seen again. He dies off stage and the aunt becomes the girl's legal guardian ("I'm Here").

The next day, Miss Trunchbull forces Miss Honey's class to undergo a gruelling physical education lesson ("The Smell of Rebellion"). Miss Trunchbull bullies the children, then verbally abuses Matilda, but Matilda discovers she can move objects with her mind ("Quiet"). Matilda demonstrates her powers to Miss Honey who tells of her own cruel and abusive aunt, who looked after her as a child after her parents died. When Miss Honey first became a teacher, her aunt produced a bill detailing everything Miss Honey consumed as a child, along with other expenses, and forced her to sign a contract binding her to pay it all back. Desperate to escape, Miss Honey found refuge in an old farm shed ("My House"). Matilda recognizes Miss Honey's scarf from the story of the acrobat and the escapologist which she realizes is the true story of Miss Honey's childhood, and that her wicked aunt is Miss Trunchbull.

Miss Trunchbull schemes to punish Lavender for putting a newt in the jug of water she usually drinks from, but her classmates try to intervene. Matilda uses her powers to write on the blackboard posing as the ghost of Miss Honey's father ("Chalk Writing"). Miss Trunchbull runs away and the children celebrate ("Revolting Children").

Miss Honey receives her parents house and money, and she becomes the new headmistress. Matilda can no longer use her powers. The Wormwoods try to escape with Michael and Matilda to Spain but the Russian mafia arrive. Sergei is impressed by Matilda's intellect, and he lets them go ("This Little Girl" reprise). Matilda is allowed to live with Miss Honey as the Wormwoods leave for Spain ("When I Grow Up" (reprise)/"Naughty" (reprise)).

== Musical numbers ==
Act I

- "Overture" – Orchestra (Note: Not present on the original London cast recording)
- "Miracle" – Children, Party Entertainer, Doctor, Mrs. Wormwood, Mr. Wormwood, Matilda, Ensemble
- "Naughty" – Matilda
- "School Song" – Ensemble
- "Pathetic" – Miss Honey
- "The Hammer" – Miss Trunchbull, Miss Honey, Ensemble
- "Naughty" (Reprise) – Matilda (Note: Not present on the original Broadway cast recording)
- "The Chokey Chant" – Ensemble
- "Loud" – Mrs. Wormwood, Rudolpho
- "This Little Girl" – Miss Honey
- "Bruce" – Company

Act II

- "Telly" – Mr. Wormwood, Michael
- "Entr'acte" – Orchestra
- "When I Grow Up" – Children, Miss Honey, Matilda, Company
- "The Smell of Rebellion" – Miss Trunchbull, Children
- "Quiet" – Matilda
- "My House" – Miss Honey, Escapologist
- "Chalk Writing" – Miss Trunchbull, Children
- "Revolting Children" – Bruce, Children, Ensemble
- "This Little Girl" (Reprise) – Sergei
- Finale: "When I Grow Up" (Reprise)/"Naughty" (Reprise) – Company

The instrumentation uses a ten-to-thirteen-piece orchestra, including keyboards, reeds, brass, strings and percussion. The performances run 2 hours and 40 minutes, including one interval. The "Overture" was included in the Broadway production while the "Entr'acte" was only used in the London production where it has now been cut apart from the final bars which lead into "When I Grow Up". Note that as of September 2023, the "Overture" has been introduced into the London production, and is included in the 2025 UK Tour.

== Recordings ==
The cast album recorded by the original Stratford company was released on CD in September 2011 and a month later as a Digital Download. It features a hidden spoken track which follows "When I Grow Up" (Reprise). This is the full version of the speech that is heard in part, before, during and after "Quiet" in the show.

A new Original Broadway cast album was released on 22 September 2013 as a CD. This contains more tracks than the UK recording and includes "The Chokey Chant". The deluxe version features Matilda's stories of the Acrobat and the Escapologist, the song "Perhaps a Child" sung by Sergei, which was cut from the show early on in the Stratford previews due to time constraints, but the final lines were included in the Broadway show as "This Little Girl Reprise". The album also included "Naughty" with all four Broadway Matildas singing.

== Roles and cast ==
Character	Stratford-upon-Avon	West End	Broadway	US tour	UK tour	UK tour
Character	2010	2011	2013	2015	2018	2025
Matilda	Adrianna Bertola Josie Griffiths Kerry Ingram	Cleo Demetriou Eleanor Worthington-Cox Kerry Ingram Sophia Kiely	Sophia Gennusa Oona Laurence Bailey Ryon Milly Shapiro	Gabby Gutierrez Mia Sinclair Jenness Mabel Tyler	Annalise Bradbury Lara Cohen Poppy Jones Nicola Turner	Madison Davis Mollie Hutton Olivia Ironmonger Sanna Kurihara
Miss Trunchbull	Bertie Carvel	Bertie Carvel	Bertie Carvel	Bryce Ryness	Craige Els	Richard Hurst
Miss Honey	Lauren Ward	Lauren Ward	Lauren Ward	Jennifer Blood	Carly Thoms	Tessa Kadler
Mr. Wormwood	Paul Kaye	Paul Kaye	Gabriel Ebert	Quinn Mattfeld	Sebastien Torkia	Adam Stafford
Mrs. Wormwood	Josie Walker	Josie Walker	Lesli Margherita	Cassie Silva	Rebecca Thornhill	Rebecca Thornhill
Mrs. Phelps	Melanie La Barrie	Melanie La Barrie	Karen Aldridge	Ora Jones	Michelle Chantelle Hopewell	Esther Niles

Notable West End replacements

- Matilda: Isobelle Molloy, Chloe Hawthorn, Lara Wollington, Lara McDonnell, Arabella Stanton
- Miss Trunchbull: Alex Gaumond, Hayden Tee, Jon Robyns
- Miss Honey: Gina Beck, Lauren Byrne
- Mr. Wormwood: Steve Furst, Neil McDermott
- Mrs. Phelps: Sharlene Whyte, Lisa Davina Phillip

Notable Broadway replacements

- Matilda: Gabriella Pizzolo, Brooklyn Shuck, Fina Strazza
- Miss Trunchbull: Craig Bierko, Christopher Sieber
- Miss Honey: Jill Paice, Alison Luff
- Mr. Wormwood: Matt Harrington, Rick Holmes
- Mrs. Wormwood: Amy Spanger
- Mrs. Phelps: Natalie Venetia Belcon

== Film adaptation ==
In June 2013, Minchin said a future film adaptation was being planned. He said during an interview, "We just got [the show] up in New York, there's a touring version that is meant to be going on in America, concurrently the English version is up, there's a film that will probably be made in the next 4 or 5 years and all this sort of stuff." Mara Wilson, who played Matilda in the original 1996 film adaptation of Dahl's novel, said, "Maybe if they made it into a movie, I could have a cameo, but that's for them to decide." Kelly, who wrote the book of the musical, is set to write the film's screenplay, with Minchin writing additional songs and music, and Warchus directing the film.

In April 2020, Ralph Fiennes was rumoured as cast in the role of Miss Trunchbull. The film was originally expected to shoot from August to December 2020 at Shepperton Studios, however, the shooting schedule for the film was interrupted due to lockdown procedures in place for the COVID-19 pandemic.

In January 2021, Lashana Lynch, Emma Thompson and Alisha Weir were confirmed as cast in the roles of Miss Honey, Miss Trunchbull and the titular role respectively, with over 200 children cast as the rest of the student body of Crunchem Hall. Ellen Kane, who worked with choreographer Peter Darling on the stage production, is set to choreograph. The film was expected to begin principal photography on 3 May 2021 in Ireland. The film is intended to be produced by Tim Bevan and Eric Fellner through Working Title Films and distributed by Netflix worldwide and Sony Pictures Releasing through its TriStar Pictures banner in the United Kingdom.

In April 2021, it was announced that Stephen Graham, Andrea Riseborough and Sindhu Vee would be joining the cast as Mr. Wormwood, Mrs. Wormwood and Mrs. Phelps respectively. Meesha Garbett as Hortensia, Charlie Hodson-Prior as Bruce, Andrei Shen as Eric, Ashton Robertson as Nigel, Winter Jarrett Glasspool as Amanda and Rei Yamachi Fulker as Lavender make up some of the 200 dancing, singing and acting kids.

The film was theatrically released in the United Kingdom on 25 November 2022, while in other countries was available on Netflix on 25 December.

== Critical reception ==
=== 2010 RSC Stratford production ===
Michael Billington, writing for The Guardian, gave the musical four stars out of five. He praised the adaptation of the book, the "ebullient music and lyrics", the direction, the stage design and the performances—especially Bertie Carvel as Miss Trunchbull. The Independent also gave the show four out of five stars and said, "The Royal Shakespeare Company has struck gold with this wildly entertaining musical … Kelly's clever adaptation and the witty, intricate songs by ... Minchin create a new, improved version of Dahl's story ... Warchus's wondrously well-drilled production finds just the right balance between gleeful grotesque humour and heart-warming poignancy."

Charles Spencer, writing for The Daily Telegraph awarded the show all five stars and praised the "splendidly witty, instantly hummable songs, dazzling choreography, a cast of impossibly cute and delightful children and a fantastic star turn from Bertie Carvel ... [Kelly's] script has both deepened the emotion of Dahl's story while adding loads of splendid jokes of his own", and concluded, "It is funny, heart-warming, and bang-on target". Matt Wolf of The Arts Desk said: "I was struck by the sight of many a child grinning as openly as their adult companions were wiping away tears". Henry Hitchings of the London Evening Standard also praised the performances, direction and design and commented on Minchin's "witty songs [in which] he switches between styles with remarkable dexterity". He continued, "There's a playfulness throughout [the book] that proves intoxicating ... In this lovingly created show, Matilda's magic positively sparkles. There's a cleverness in the writing which ensures that, while it appeals to children, there is plenty for adults to savour ... it's blissfully funny."

In September 2019, The Guardian writers listed the RSC performance of Matilda as the seventh best theatre show since 2000.

=== Original London production ===
The reviews of the London performances were also extremely positive. Julie Carpenter of the Daily Express awarded the show all five stars and called the musical "[g]loriously over the top", and said, "it's an irresistible and ingenious mix of fun, fizz, cruelty, incredible choreography and above all warmth which means we root for the kids from the start. Fantastic." Henry Hitchings's review in the Evening Standard ranked the piece five stars, praising the music and lyrics, book, set design, choreography, direction and performances. The review in The Guardian said, "You'd be a nitwit to miss this hit show." The Stage also gave Matilda five stars, as did Spencer, writing again for The Telegraph. Confirming his impression of the 2010 production, he wrote about the West End transfer:

"I suspect it will delight audiences for years to come ... [Kelly's] script actually improves and deepens Dahl's original ... [Minchin's] smashing score ... combines take-home melodies with delicious lyrical wit in songs that consistently develop both the plot and our understanding of the characters. There is an exuberant sense here of two writers who have clicked together ... [Matilda] so wittily excoriates the cruelty and crassness of our age ... Warchus's thrilling, warm-hearted production, exuberantly designed by Rob Howell and with pin-sharp choreography by Peter Darling, constantly combines comedy with a sense of wonder. The children [and the adult performances are 'hilarious' (Bailey), 'memorable' (Walker and Kaye) and 'touchingly sweet' (Ward)] ... But the star turn is Bertie Carvel".

The Financial Times, The Times and The Sunday Times each awarded the show four stars out of five, but found little to criticise. Ben Brantley, writing for The New York Times, called the adaptation "a sweet and sharp-witted work of translation, which ... turns dark and sodden anxieties into bright and buoyant fantasies [that address] a raging thirst these days for [such] tonics". A year after the show opened, Time Out gave the production four stars out of five, noting the departure of Carvel and calling the show "a little too long and, dramatically, a tad wayward", but nevertheless "wise, wicked, glorious fun."

=== Original Broadway production ===
Most of the New York critics gave the Broadway transfer their highest marks. Brantley wrote: "Matilda works with astonishing slyness and grace to inculcate us with its radical point of view. [It] is about words and language, books and stories, and their incalculable worth as weapons of defense, attack and survival ... Above all it's an exhilarating tale of empowerment". He also said the child actors "strengthen their diction" so that the "tasty lyrics" could be clearly heard. Richard Zoglin, in Time magazine said that the show is "a fresh start for the Broadway musical" with "a score that seems all but woven into the scenery—simple but distinctive tunes ... intricate lyrics ... Every element of the show seems hand-crafted and right". He said that director Warchus "lets the characters go gloriously over the top (the way children see them), but also brings a hushed intensity". He also said that the second act "runs a bit too long" and that "the combination of shrill child voices, British accents and heavy miking causes many of the lyrics to get muddled". Elisabeth Vincentelli's review in the New York Post said, "Once in a blue moon, a show comes out blazing and restores your faith in Broadway. Matilda The Musical is that show." David Rooney of The Hollywood Reporter said the stage show captured "the unique flavor of Roald Dahl's classic 1988 children's novel", and added, "this funhouse fairy tale is by turns riotous and poignant, grotesque and menacing, its campy comic exaggeration equaled only by its transporting emotional power".

David Cote, in Time Out New York, wondered whether the show was too English for Broadway tastes; he wrote, "Matilda is a kids' musical, not a musical that happens to be about a kid. As such, its attractions may be limited to younger spectators and die-hard Dahl fans. That would be a pity, since Matilda is wickedly smart and wildly fun". A review in USA Today said the show tries too hard to be clever, but it is affecting and enchanting. Of the British papers reviewing the transfer, The Telegraph gave the show four stars out of five, and said, "There's a harder-edged quality to the New York staging: the general tenor is louder and more exaggerated, and the Gilbertian finesse of [the] astonishing lyrics didn't translate for my companion ... But the tremendous heart and intelligence of the piece remains undimmed." A review by Brendan Lemon in the Financial Times also gave the piece four stars out of five.

== Awards and nominations ==
=== London production ===
Year	Award Ceremony	Category	Nominee	Result	Ref
2011	Critics' Circle Theatre Awards	Best Musical		Won	
2011	UK Theatre Awards	Best Musical		Won	
2011	UK Theatre Awards	Best Performance	Bertie Carvel	Won	
2011	Evening Standard Theatre Awards	Best Musical		Won	
2011	Evening Standard Theatre Awards	Best Actor	Bertie Carvel	Nominated	
2011	Evening Standard Theatre Awards	Best Director	Matthew Warchus	Nominated	
2011	British Composer Awards	Best Stage Work	Tim Minchin	Nominated	
2012	Laurence Olivier Awards	Best New Musical		Won	
2012	Laurence Olivier Awards	Best Actor in a Musical	Bertie Carvel	Won	
2012	Laurence Olivier Awards	Best Actress in a Musical	Cleo Demetriou; Kerry Ingram; Eleanor Worthington-Cox; Sophia Kiely	Won	
2012	Laurence Olivier Awards	Best Performance in a Supporting Role in a Musical	Paul Kaye	Nominated	
2012	Laurence Olivier Awards	Best Director	Matthew Warchus	Won	
2012	Laurence Olivier Awards	Best Theatre Choreographer	Peter Darling	Won	
2012	Laurence Olivier Awards	Best Set Design	Rob Howell	Won	
2012	Laurence Olivier Awards	Best Costume Design	Rob Howell	Nominated	
2012	Laurence Olivier Awards	Best Lighting Design	Hugh Vanstone	Nominated	
2012	Laurence Olivier Awards	Best Sound Design	Simon Baker	Won	

=== Broadway production ===
Year	Award Ceremony	Category	Nominee	Result	Ref
2013	Tony Award	Best Musical		Nominated	
2013	Tony Award	Best Book of a Musical	Dennis Kelly	Won	
2013	Tony Award	Best Original Score	Tim Minchin	Nominated	
2013	Tony Award	Best Actor in a Musical	Bertie Carvel	Nominated	
2013	Tony Award	Best Featured Actor in a Musical	Gabriel Ebert	Won	
2013	Tony Award	Best Featured Actress in a Musical	Lauren Ward	Nominated	
2013	Tony Award	Best Direction of a Musical	Matthew Warchus	Nominated	
2013	Tony Award	Best Choreography	Peter Darling	Nominated	
2013	Tony Award	Best Orchestrations	Christopher Nightingale	Nominated	
2013	Tony Award	Best Scenic Design of a Musical	Rob Howell	Won	
2013	Tony Award	Best Costume Design of a Musical	Rob Howell	Nominated	
2013	Tony Award	Best Lighting Design of a Musical	Hugh Vanstone	Won	
2013	Tony Award	Tony Honors for Excellence in Theatre	Sophia Gennusa, Oona Laurence, Bailey Ryon, Milly Shapiro	Honored	
2013	Drama League Awards	Outstanding Production of a Broadway or off-Broadway Musical		Nominated	
2013	Drama League Awards	Distinguished Performance Award	Bertie Carvel	Nominated	
2013	Outer Critics Circle Awards	Outstanding New Broadway Musical		Nominated	
2013	Outer Critics Circle Awards	Outstanding Book of a Musical (Broadway or Off-Broadway)		Won	
2013	Outer Critics Circle Awards	Outstanding Choreographer	Peter Darling	Nominated	
2013	Outer Critics Circle Awards	Outstanding Set Design (Play or Musical)	Rob Howell	Won	
2013	Outer Critics Circle Awards	Outstanding Actor in a Musical	Bertie Carvel	Nominated	
2013	Drama Desk Award	Outstanding Musical		Won	
2013	Drama Desk Award	Outstanding Book of a Musical	Dennis Kelly	Won	
2013	Drama Desk Award	Outstanding Featured Actor in a Musical	Bertie Carvel	Won	
2013	Drama Desk Award	Outstanding Director of a Musical	Matthew Warchus	Nominated	
2013	Drama Desk Award	Outstanding Choreography	Peter Darling	Nominated	
2013	Drama Desk Award	Outstanding Lyrics	Tim Minchin	Won	
2013	Drama Desk Award	Outstanding Set Design	Rob Howell	Won	
2013	New York Drama Critics' Circle Award	Best Musical		Won	
2013	Theatre World Award		Bertie Carvel	Won	
2014	Grammy Award	Best Musical Theater Album		Nominated	

=== Australian production ===
Year	Award Ceremony	Category	Nominee	Result	Ref
2015	Sydney Theatre Awards	Best production of a mainstream musical		Won	
2015	Sydney Theatre Awards	Best performance by an actress in a supporting role in a musical	Elise McCann	Won	
2015	Sydney Theatre Awards	Best performance by an actress in a supporting role in a musical	Marika Aubrey	Nominated	
2015	Sydney Theatre Awards	Best performance by an actor in a supporting role in a musical	James Millar	Won	
2015	Sydney Theatre Awards	Best performance by an actor in a supporting role in a musical	Daniel Frederiksen	Nominated	
2015	Sydney Theatre Awards	Special achievement award	Molly Barwick; Sasha Rose; Georgia Taplin; Bella Thomas	Won	
2016	Helpmann Awards	Best Musical		Won	
2016	Helpmann Awards	Best Original Score	Tim Minchin	Won	
2016	Helpmann Awards	Best Direction of a Musical	Matthew Warchus	Won	
2016	Helpmann Awards	Best Female Actor in a Musical	Molly Barwick; Dusty Bursill; Tiana Mirra; Alannah Parfett; Sasha Rose; Georgia Taplin; Bella Thomas; Ingrid Torelli	Won	
2016	Helpmann Awards	Best Male Actor in a Musical	James Millar	Won	
2016	Helpmann Awards	Best Choreography in a Musical	Peter Darling	Won	
2016	Helpmann Awards	Best Music Direction	Stephen Amos	Won	
2016	Helpmann Awards	Best Sound Design	Simon Baker	Won	
2016	Helpmann Awards	Best Scenic Design	Rob Howell	Won	
2016	Helpmann Awards	Best Costume Design	Rob Howell	Won	
2016	Helpmann Awards	Best Lighting Design	Hugh Vanstone	Won	
2016	Helpmann Awards	Best Male Actor in a Supporting Role in a Musical	Daniel Frederiksen	Won	
2016	Helpmann Awards	Best Female Actor in a Supporting Role in a Musical	Elise McCann	Won	
2016	Green Room Awards	Outstanding Music Theatre Award for Production		Won	
2016	Green Room Awards	Music Theatre Award for Direction	Matthew Warchus	Won	
2016	Green Room Awards	Betty Pounder Award for Excellence in Choreography	Peter Darling	Won	
2016	Green Room Awards	Music Theatre Award for Musical Direction/Supervision	Stephen Amos	Won	
2016	Green Room Awards	Music Theatre Award for Sound Design	Simon Baker	Won	
2016	Green Room Awards	Music Theatre Award for Costume Design	Rob Howell	Won	
2016	Green Room Awards	Music Theatre Award for Set Design	Rob Howell	Won	
2016	Green Room Awards	Music Theatre Award for Lighting Design	Hugh Vanstone	Won	
2016	Green Room Awards	Music Theatre Award for Male in a Supporting Role	Daniel Frederiksen	Nominated	
2016	Green Room Awards	Music Theatre Award for Female in a Supporting Role	Elise McCann	Nominated	
2016	Green Room Awards	Music Theatre Award for Male Lead	James Millar	Nominated	
2016	Green Room Awards	Music Theatre Award for Female Lead	Dusty Bursill; Tiana Mirra; Alannah Parfett; Ingrid Torelli	Nominated	
2017	Helpmann Awards	Best Female Actor in a Supporting Role in a Musical	Lucy Maunder	Nominated	
