= Charlotte Wakefield =

British actress

Charlotte Wakefield is a British actress of the stage and screen. She started out as a child actor in the film An Angel for May. She played the role of Wendla Bergman in Spring Awakening in London for which she was nominated for Best Actress in a Musical at the 2010 Laurence Olivier Awards.

She was nominated a second time for her performance in the Regents Park Open Air Theatre production of The Sound of Music in 2013.

She played Gemma in The Great British Bake Off Musical and is the voice of Mattis in the video game Balder’s Gate 3.

In 2025, she starred in the musical Titanique at the Criterion Theatre. A review in the Financial Times said, "Charlotte Wakefield as Molly Brown stops the show with her rendition of 'All By Myself'".
