= Peter Darling =

English dancer and choreographer

Peter Darling (born 25 October 1963) is an English dancer and choreographer best known for his award-winning work in Billy Elliot the Musical.

In 2010, he choreographed Matilda the Musical at the RSC's Courtyard Theatre, which has since transferred to the West End and Broadway. He also choreographed for another Roahl Dahl stage adaptation, Charlie and the Chocolate Factory. In 2015, it was announced he had teamed up with the creative team from Matilda to choreograph Groundhog Day. The musical transferred to The Old Vic in 2016, running through to September.

He was educated at Alleyn's School.
