= Sophia Kiely =

English actress (born 2000)

- Born: Sophia Kiely; 2000 (age 25–26); Kensington, London, England
- Occupation: Actress
- Known for: Matilda the Musical (2011)

Sophia Kiely (born 2000) is an English actress. She is known for playing the title role in Matilda the Musical (2011). Kiely shared the role with Cleo Demetriou, Kerry Ingram, and Eleanor Worthington Cox, all of whom won the Olivier Award in 2012.

== Career ==
Kiely played Matilda at the Cambridge Theatre in the West End debut of Matilda the Musical. After rehearsing the show since August, she made her debut on 27 October 2011. In April 2012 Sophia won an Olivier Award for Best Actress in a Musical along with her co-stars. She made a special appearance as Matilda for West End Live in Trafalgar Square, performing "Naughty".

Kiely graduated with a Master's in Mathematics from the University of St Andrews in June 2023. She was a member of the University's improvised theatre group and received Piano Scholarships.

== Theatre credits ==
Year	Title	Role	Theatre	Dates	Ref(s)
2011–2012	Matilda the Musical	Matilda Wormwood	Cambridge Theatre	25 October 2011 – 14 April 2012	

=== Awards ===
Year	Award	Category	Title	Result	Ref(s)
2012	Whatsonstage.com Awards	Best Actress in a Musical (shared with: Cleo Demetriou, Kerry Ingram and Eleanor Worthington Cox)	Matilda the Musical	Nominated	
2012	Laurence Olivier Award	Best Actress in a Musical (shared with: Cleo Demetriou, Kerry Ingram and Eleanor Worthington Cox)	Matilda the Musical	Won	
