= Cleo Demetriou =

Cypriot-British actress

- Born: Cleopatra Demetriou; 23 April 2001 (age 25); Limassol, Cyprus
- Occupations: Actress, singer
- Years active: 2007–present

Cleopatra "Cleo" Demetriou (/ˈkliːoʊ dɪmɛtˈriːuː/; Greek: Κλεοπάτρα Δημητρίου; born 23 April 2001) is a British actress. She played the role of Lily Hampton in the CBBC show So Awkward and the main role in Matilda the Musical in London's West End and sang the soundtrack "Made of Paper" to accompany the short film Mâché Man.

In 2012 she won the Laurence Olivier Award for Best Actress in a Musical.

== Early life and career ==
Demetriou was born in Cyprus, and lived in Putney in south-west London throughout her primary school years at Brandlehow Primary School; she subsequently attended Chailey Secondary School and later Imberhorne School.

She appeared as Matilda in the musical of the same name, for which she received the 2012 Laurence Olivier Award for Best Actress in a Musical.

She made her professional stage debut in 2009 playing Gretl in the Sound of Music, and has performed on stage in Enron and Les Misérables.

Demetriou made her television debut in the CBBC sitcom So Awkward playing Lily Hampton. The show, which was first aired on 21 May 2015, follows three socially awkward teenage girls at school who have the problems of fitting in, annoying parents, and boys to worry about. The show ended in 2020, but since then has spanned a number of spin-off series, all of which show Lily after leaving Cranmede.

== Filmography ==
=== Television ===
| Year | Title | Role | Notes |
|---|---|---|---|
| 2007 | What's Your News? | Child Interviewer | |
| 2009 | Katy Brand's Big Ass Show | American Girl | |
| 2015–20 | So Awkward | Lily Hampton | 77 episodes |
| 2015 | Brian the Brain | Brain | 1 episode |
| 2017 | Top Class | Brain | 1 episode; celebrity special |
| 2018, 2021 | Saturday Mash-Up! | Celebrity Guest | 2 episodes |
| 2021 | Still So Awkward! | Lily Hampton | 13 episodes |
| 2024–2025 | So Awkward Academy | Lily Hampton | 20 episodes + 2 specials |
| 2026 | Girl Troop vs Aliens | Olive Moss | 8 episodes |

=== Theatre ===
| Year | Production | Role | Location |
|---|---|---|---|
| 2008 | The Sound of Music | Gretl von Trapp | London Palladium |
| 2009 | ENRON | Daughter | Royal Court Theatre |
| 2011 | Les Misérables | Young Cosette | Queen's Theatre |
| 2011–12 | Matilda the Musical | Matilda Wormwood | Cambridge Theatre; 28 October 2011 – 18 August 2012 |
| 2025-26 | Sleeping Beauty | Princess Rose | Floral Pavilion Theatre; 6 December 2025 - 4 January 2026 |

== Awards and nominations ==
| Year | Award | Category | Production | Result |
|---|---|---|---|---|
| 2011 | WhatsOnStage.com Awards | Best Actress in a Musical (shared with Kerry Ingram, Sophia Kiely and Eleanor Worthington Cox) | Matilda the Musical | Nominated |
| 2012 | Laurence Olivier Awards | Best Actress in a Musical (shared with Kerry Ingram, Sophia Kiely and Eleanor Worthington Cox) | Matilda the Musical | Won |
| 2018 | British Academy Children's Awards | Best Comedy | So Awkward | Won |
