= Kerry Ingram =

English actress (born 1999)

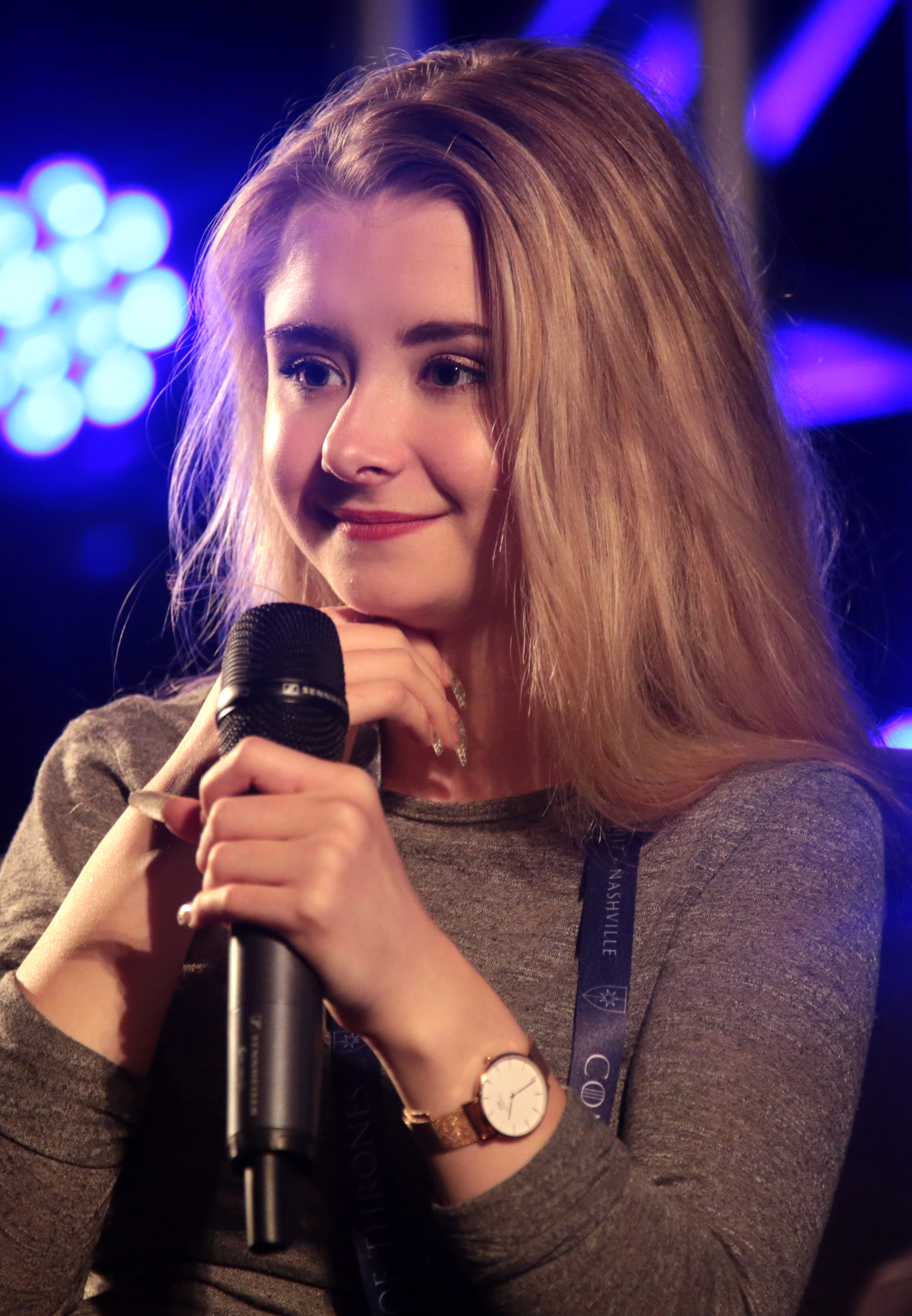
- Ingram in July 2017
- Born: 26 May 1999 (age 27); Berkshire, England
- Occupation: Actress
- Years active: 2009–present
- Known for: Game of Thrones; Free Rein; Matilda the Musical

Kerry Danielle Ingram (born 26 May 1999) is an English actress, known for her roles as Shireen Baratheon in the HBO series Game of Thrones and Rebecca Sidebottom in the Netflix series Free Rein.

== Career ==
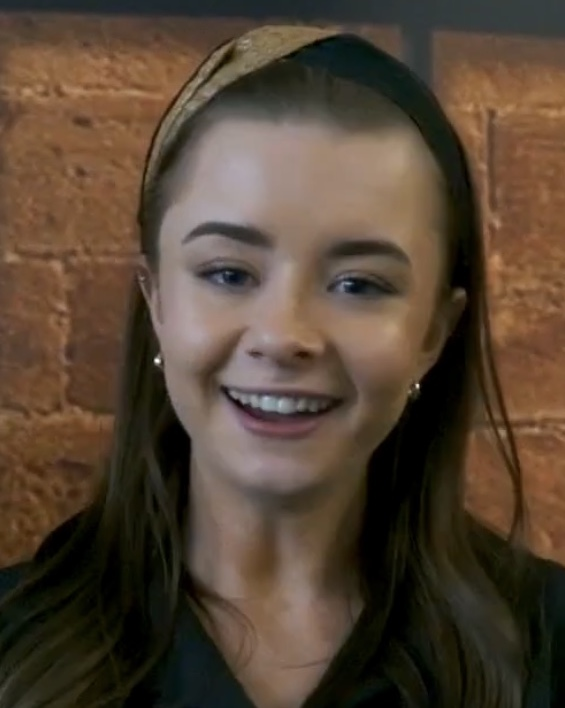
Kerry Ingram in 2020

Before being cast in Matilda, Ingram played a workhouse child in Oliver! at the Theatre Royal, Drury Lane. From November 2010 to January 2011 she played the title role in the Royal Shakespeare Company's Matilda the Musical in Stratford-upon-Avon. She was the only original Matilda transferred to the West End cast, where she shared the role with three other girls at the Cambridge Theatre. In April 2012, just after departing the show, she received an Olivier Award for Best Actress in a Musical. After completing Matilda, she played a small role in Tom Hooper's film adaptation of Les Miserables.

From 2013 to 2015, Ingram portrayed Shireen Baratheon in the third through fifth seasons of HBO's fantasy TV series Game of Thrones. In 2013, she appeared at the Doctor Who Prom as the Queen of Years, where she sang "The Rings of Akhaten" with Allan Clayton. Other roles include Lois Wren in an episode of Doctors, and a role in the BBC adaptation of Wolf Hall alongside Mark Rylance and Damian Lewis. From 2017 to 2019 Ingram portrayed series regular Rebecca "Becky" Sidebottom in the Daytime Emmy award-winning Netflix original Free Rein and also reprised the role for two special film episodes.

== Personal life ==
Kerry Danielle Ingram is of Maltese descent, with her mother and grandfather being from Mqabba. Ingram now lives in Manchester. Ingram has a form of osteogenesis imperfecta; having regularly fractured her bones, she requires periodic infusions to increase her bone mass.

== Filmography ==
=== Film ===
Year	Title	Role	Notes	Ref(s)
2009	Robin Hood	Village child	Uncredited	
2010	Burke and Hare	Child thief	Uncredited	
2012	Les Misérables	Turning Women 8	Cut from final edit	
2018	Free Rein: The 12 Neighs of Christmas	Becky	Netflix original	
2019	Free Rein: Valentine's Day	Becky	Netflix original	

=== Television ===
Year	Title	Role	Notes	Ref(s)
2013	Doctor Who at the Proms	The Queen of Years	Soloist	
2013–2015	Game of Thrones	Shireen Baratheon	10 episodes	
2014	Doctors	Lois Wren	Episode: "Unsolved Mysteries"	
2015	Wolf Hall	Young Alice Williamson	Episode: "Entirely Beloved"	
2016	Barbarians Rising	Hilde	Episode: "Boudica"	
2016	Doctors	Hannah Devlin	3 episodes	
2016	Thronecast	Herself	1 episode	
2017–2019	Free Rein	Rebecca "Becky" Sidebottom	Season regular (32 episodes)	

=== Theatre ===
Year	Title	Role	Notes	Ref(s)
2010	Oliver!	Workhouse child	Theatre Royal, Drury Lane	
2010–2011	Matilda the Musical	Matilda Wormwood	Courtyard Theatre; 9 November 2010 – 29 January 2011	
2011–2012	Matilda the Musical	Matilda Wormwood	Cambridge Theatre; 26 October 2011 – 12 April 2012	
2017	Animalphabet	Metro the Gnome	The Fringe, as well as nationwide UK tour	
2025–2026	Mother Goose	Colinetta Goose	South Hill Park, Berkshire Pantomime	
2026	Bugsy Malone	Tallulah	The Malthouse Theatre, Canterbury	
2026-2027	Peter Pan	Wendy	Norwich Theatre Royal, Norwich pantomime	

=== Radio ===
Year	Title	Role	Company	Notes	Ref(s)
2011	Chitty Chitty Bang Bang	Jemima Potts	BBC	Original recording	

== Awards and nominations ==
Year	Award	Category	Work	Result	Ref(s)
2011	WhatsOnStage.com Awards	Best Actress in a Musical (shared with Cleo Demetriou, Sophia Kiely and Eleanor Worthington Cox)	Matilda the Musical	Nominated	
2012	Laurence Olivier Award	Best Actress in a Musical (shared with Cleo Demetriou, Sophia Kiely and Eleanor Worthington Cox)	Matilda the Musical	Won	
