= LIF =

LIF, LiF or Lif may refer to:

== Music ==
- "Lif" (song), a 2022 song by SCH
- Mr. Lif (Jeffrey Haynes), a rapper
- "Lif", the last track on Horse the Band's album A Natural Death
- "Líf", a song by Hildur Vala Einarsdóttir

== Science ==
- Leukemia inhibitory factor, a cytokine that affects cell growth and development
- Laser-induced fluorescence, a spectroscopic method
- Low insertion force sockets
- Lithium fluoride, a chemical compound used for windows, prisms, and lenses from vacuum UV to near IR range
- Left Iliac fossa, a part of human and primate anatomy
- Local inertial frame, a concept in general relativity

== Other uses ==
- Liquid Impact Forming, metalworking process
- Liberal Forum, a former Austrian political party
- Life Income Fund, is registered retirement savings vehicle used in Canada, particularly for funds transferred from employer pension plans. A LIF is used to draw retirement income from funds.
- Leirvík ÍF (LÍF Leirvík) a Faroese football club
- Lif Island, an island of Papua New Guinea
- Líf and Lífþrasir, characters from Norse mythology
- Lughat al-Ishārā al-Filisṭīniyya (LIF), the Modern Standard Arabic name for Palestinian Levantine Sign

== See also ==
- Liff (disambiguation)
