= List of Summer Camp Island episodes =

The following is a list of episodes from the Cartoon Network animated series Summer Camp Island. On May 9, 2020, it was announced that the series is moving to HBO Max. The show was removed from HBO Max in August 2022 due to the Warner Bros. Discovery merger, but episodes from Season 2 onward made their TV premieres on Cartoon Network beginning June 19, 2023.

== Series overview ==
Season	Episodes		Originally released		
Season	Episodes		First released	Last released	Network
1	40	20	July 7, 2018		Cartoon Network
1	40	20	June 23, 2019	July 21, 2019	Cartoon Network
2	20		June 18, 2020		HBO Max
3	12		December 10, 2020	December 24, 2020	HBO Max
4	13		June 17, 2021		HBO Max
5	15		December 9, 2021		HBO Max
6	20		July 31, 2023	August 11, 2023	Cartoon Network

== Episodes ==
=== Precursors (2011–12) ===
The main Summer Camp Island characters, Oscar, Hedgehog and Max, make their first appearances as incarnations in two of Julia Pott's independent shorts: the first is her multi-awarded student film from Royal College of Art (called Belly), while the second is her Sundance Film Festival 2013-nominated short The Event.

Title	Directed by	Written by	Original release date
"Belly"	Julia Pott	Julia Pott	November 2011
Oscar and a strange malleable creature must rescue his older brother, Alex, from the inside of a whale. However, the inside of the whale seems to be a different world altogether and the creature gets stuck to the interior, forcing the brothers to leave him behind.
"The Event"	Julia Pott	Tom Chivers	2012
A poem played over scenes of two humanoid hedgehog-like people encountering strange things that seem to indicate an apocalyptic-like scenario.

=== Pilot (2016) ===
Title	Directed by	Written and storyboarded by	Original release date	Prod. code
"Summer Camp Island"	Nick Cross (art), and Robert Alvarez with Randy Myers (animation)	Julia Pott	March 17, 2016	503-004
Oscar wants his Summer Camp experience to be normal, so he and his best friend Hedgehog have a BFF Sleepover. Hedgehog invites Max and some anthropomorphic friends to the party, upsetting Oscar with their surreal antics. Oscar eventually gets advice from Shark on being a better friend, but afterwards learns that Hedgehog has a crush on Max, leaving Oscar heartbroken.

=== Season 1 (2018–19) ===
No. overall	No. in season	Title	Written and storyboarded by	Story by	Original release date	Prod. code	U.S. viewers (millions)
1	1	"The First Day"	Sam Alden and Graham Falk; Adam Muto (additional storyboarder)	Julia Pott, Jack Pendarvis, and Kent Osborne	July 7, 2018	1057-010	0.47
Oscar (voiced by Elliott Smith in season 1, Asher Bishop in season 2, and Antonio Raul Corbo in seasons 3–6) and his best friend Hedgehog (voiced by Oona Laurence) arrive at Summer Camp Island with the intent to do typical camp activities, only to discover that the camp counselors are witches and everything on the island is alive. While Hedgehog takes a liking to her new surroundings, Oscar has difficulty adjusting.
2	2	"Monster Babies"	Seo Kim and Aleks Sennwald	Julia Pott, Amalia Levari, Kent Osborne, Jack Pendarvis, and Mike Roth	July 7, 2018	1057-005	0.47
Feeling that the monsters are not cute enough, Alice (voiced by Lo Mutuc (Note: credited as Charlyne Yi)) turns them into babies with all the campers enjoying their adorable state. Oscar however, elects to turn the monsters back into grownups and he, Hedgehog and Max (voiced by Ramone Hamilton) decide to build a water slide in the hopes that the campers will forget about the monster babies.
3	3	"Chocolate Money Badgers"	Julia Pott	Julia Pott, Amalia Levari, Kent Osborne, and Mike Roth	July 7, 2018	1057-001	0.45
Tired of Susie's (voiced by Julia Pott) bossiness and rules, Oscar discovers that he and his fellow campers can earn badges for rewards if they complete certain tasks. Due to the rules, Susie and the witches have no choice, but to adhere to them, though they quickly decide to sabotage the campers' efforts.
4	4	"Saxophone Come Home"	Sam Alden and Graham Falk	Julia Pott, Amalia Levari, Kent Osborne, and Mike Roth	July 7, 2018	1057-002	0.45
When Oscar meets a teenage yeti named Saxophone (voiced by Elijah Wood), he brings him to camp and enjoys his company, showing him the cool things at camp. What Oscar doesn't know however, is that Saxophone will go feral as he slowly enters adulthood.
5	5	"Pajama Pajimjams"	Aleks Sennwald and Seo Kim	Julia Pott, Kent Osborne, and Jack Pendarvis	July 7, 2018	1057-009	0.40
Oscar pretends to be a talking pair of pajamas named Jimjams (voiced by Bobby Moynihan) to make his friend Pajamas (voiced by Naomi Hansen) happy. But when Oscar gets tired of pretending to be Jimjams, he, Hedgehog, and Max go on an adventure to find the ingredients for a potion that can bring Jimjams to life.
6	6	"Oscar & Hedgehog's Melody"	Sam Alden and Graham Falk; Aleks Sennwald (additional storyboarder)	Julia Pott, Jack Pendarvis, and Kent Osborne	July 7, 2018	1057-014	0.40
Susie announces the annual talent show, which she wins every year, and makes a bet with Oscar and Hedgehog. They set up a musical act using a piano and half full glasses that form a beautiful melody. However, every time they play they end up causing an unusual earthquake.
7	7	"Feeling Spacey"	Aleks Sennwald and Seo Kim	Julia Pott, Kent Osborne, and Jack Pendarvis	July 7, 2018	1057-015	0.39
Oscar and Hedgehog find themselves lifted into space and to the planet of the aliens and learn that they have no emotions due to one of them having hoarded them all. To avoid having their own emotions drained, Oscar and Hedgehog decide to look for the culprit, but finds that he may be closer than they think.
8	8	"Ghost the Boy"	Kris Mukai and Steve Wolfhard	Julia Pott, Jack Pendarvis, and Kent Osborne	July 7, 2018	1057-012	0.39
Oscar and Hedgehog meet Ghost (voiced by Caleb McLaughlin in Season 1 and Xavier Patterson in Season 5 onwards), who has trouble remembering his past and where he came from, so Oscar and Hedgehog set out to find any possible connections. A very anxious Susie gives them a map that leads them to a dangerous swamp.
9	9	"Computer Vampire"	Somvilay Xayaphone and Hanna Nyström; Aleks Sennwald (additional storyboarder)	Julia Pott, Jack Pendarvis, and Kent Osborne	July 7, 2018	1057-018	0.43
While at the library, Oscar plays a computer game called Fruit Farmer, but fails to finish it when he is frightened by the vampire at the end. Upon leaving, everyone on the island suddenly takes on roles as characters from the game, forcing Oscar to have to beat it in real life.
10	10	"The Basketball Liaries"	Steve Wolfhard and Kris Mukai; Aleks Sennwald (additional storyboarder)	Julia Pott, Jack Pendarvis, and Kent Osborne	July 7, 2018	1057-017	0.43
Oscar wants to join Hedgehog on the Gold League basketball team, but he is terrible. He promises the basketball (voiced by Luke Lowe) itself to be his best friend and he agrees, suddenly making Oscar the best basketball player. However, Basketball soon becomes possessive and threatens Oscar with revealing his lie.
11	11	"Popular Banana Split"	Seo Kim and Aleks Sennwald	Julia Pott, Kent Osborne, and Jack Pendarvis	July 7, 2018	1057-013	0.47
While attempting a science experiment, Hedgehog and Max get shrunk down and go to a high school for food where they must help photo journalist Cinnamon Raisin Toast (voiced by Alia Shawkat) go to prom with jock Popular Banana Split (voiced by Nat Faxon). Meanwhile, Oscar tries looking for his friends and ends up going feral.
12	12	"Time Traveling Quick Pants"	Somvilay Xayaphone and Alabaster Pizzo	Julia Pott, Amalia Levari, Bobby Miller, Kent Osborne, and Mike Roth	July 7, 2018	1057-004	0.47
During a softball game, Oscar's pants come down revealing embarrassing underpants. He and Hedgehog learn about a quicksand portal that allows people to travel through time and use it to fix his mistake. They end up causing more problems resulting in them finding solutions for them.
13	13	"It's My Party"	Somvilay Xayaphone and Kirsten Lepore	Julia Pott, Jack Pendarvis, and Kent Osborne	July 7, 2018	1057-016	0.49
Susie asks Oscar and Hedgehog to throw a "surprise" birthday party for her. While they initially say no, they cave in when they see Susie acting sad. While the party comes together nicely, no one can stand Susie's bossy nature, so everyone says the opposite about how they feel about her.
14	14	"Moon Problems"	Steve Manale and Aleks Sennwald; Kent Osborne (additional storyboarder)	Julia Pott, Jack Pendarvis, and Kent Osborne	July 7, 2018	1057-003	0.49
When Oscar loses his friendship bracelet, the Moon (voiced by Cedric the Entertainer) is emotionally affected and decides to quit his job. At first, Oscar does not seem to mind until Susie deduces that his ignorance is the reason for the Moon leaving. Meanwhile, the Moon decides to take up the harmonica and start a new life.
15	15	"Monster Visit"	Sam Alden and Graham Falk	Julia Pott, Jack Pendarvis, and Kent Osborne	July 7, 2018	1057-019	0.48
The monsters try to flee when their Godmonster (voiced by Brenda Vaccaro) announces her return to check on their status as "real monsters". Oscar and Hedgehog help them out by proving that they are legitimately terrifying, but must rescue Oscar when Godmonster kidnaps him to cook him.
16	16	"Ice Cream Headache"	Somvilay Xayaphone and Colin Howard; Adam Muto and Aleks Sennwald (additional storyboarders)	Julia Pott, Jack Pendarvis, and Kent Osborne	July 7, 2018	1057-011	0.48
When the Sun (voiced by Melanie Lynskey) increases her hotness, Susie agrees to give Oscar the key to the ice cream pantry and gives everyone a flavor called "Peppermint Occasion" resulting in everyone getting powers. Due to being lactose intolerant, Oscar does not get any and the campers try to cheer him up by pretending he is invisible.
17	17	"Pepper's Blanket Is Missing"	Kris Mukai and Polly Guo; Aleks Sennwald (additional storyboarder)	Julia Pott, Jack Pendarvis, and Kent Osborne	July 7, 2018	1057-020	0.50
While reading a scary story, Pepper's (voiced by Sam Lavagnino in 2 seasons and Julian Edwards in Season 4 onwards) blanket suddenly disappears. Hedgehog takes the lead in solving the case with many of the clues pointing to Oscar who is surprisingly optimistic about the situation. However if the thief is not caught, Oscar will have to go on sailor leave with Susie.
18	18	"Hedgehog Werewolf"	Graham Falk and Sam Alden; Aleks Sennwald (additional storyboarder)	Julia Pott, Jack Pendarvis, and Kent Osborne	July 7, 2018	1057-006	0.50
Hedgehog gets bit by a wolf cub (later revealed to be Werewolf Queen, voiced by Lorraine Bracco) after avoiding hitting it with her bike and discovers that she can now transform into a werewolf at the full moon. Susie and the whole camp turn on her and she and Oscar decide to get the Werewolf Queen's fur to cure her, but Hedgehog ends up liking her werewolf form.
19	19	"Mr. Softball"	Hanna Nyström and Somvilay Xayaphone	Julia Pott, Jack Pendarvis, Kent Osborne, Ashly Burch, and Cole Sanchez	July 7, 2018	1057-007	0.51
When Susie is next to clean the killer whale's teeth, she challenges the campers to a softball game to get out of it. Susie and the witches start using their magic to cheat, angering the campers who insist that Oscar allow them to cheat as well and get back at the witches' unfairness.
20	20	"Fuzzy Pink Time Babies"	Seo Kim and Aleks Sennwald	Julia Pott, Jack Pendarvis, and Kent Osborne	July 7, 2018	1068-021	0.51
Hedgehog's father Jim (voiced by Richard Kind) wants her to attend business camp upsetting Oscar. Out of sympathy, the Moon gives them one of his rocks so that they can stop time and spend as much of their childhood as they can. 3 months later, they encounter an old witch named Ramona (voiced by Lesley Nicol) who warns them of the time creature called the Jabberwock.
21	21	"Cosmic Bupkiss"	Somvilay Xayaphone and Hanna Nyström	Julia Pott, Emma Fletcher, Kent Osborne, and Sarah Lloyd	June 23, 2019	1068-022	0.41
Oscar and Hedgehog set out to view the Bupkiss Comet, but the monsters inform the two that a major storm is coming and that it will block their view. The two race to the mountains in an effort to see the comet, but when the storm hogs the top spot to himself, Oscar and Hedgehog take refuge in Ramona's cottage and discover some photos of Susie and Ramona.
22	22	"Radio Silence"	Sam Alden and Graham Falk	Julia Pott, Emma Fletcher, Kent Osborne, and Sarah Lloyd	June 23, 2019	1068-023	0.41
When Oscar accidentally destroys a sandwich for Hedgehog's radio show, he sets out to a Sasquatch Monastery to get a new one, but must leave his voice at the door. The Monastery ends up closing and Oscar cannot get his voice back, resulting in him desperately trying to explain his situation to a very angry and annoyed Hedgehog.
23	23	"Director's Cut"	Graham Falk and Kent Osborne	Julia Pott, Emma Fletcher, Kent Osborne, and Sarah Lloyd	June 23, 2019	1068-028	0.43
Oscar receives a camcorder from his parents, but learn that they think he is making things up about all the magical things on the island. He and Hedgehog decide to make a documentary about all the creatures so that they can send it to them, but Susie does not want to risk the secret of the island out and steals the camcorder.
24	24	"The Haunted Campfire"	Somvilay Xayaphone and Jesse Moynihan	Julia Pott, Emma Fletcher, Kent Osborne, and Sarah Lloyd	June 23, 2019	1068-027	0.43
The campers start telling ghost stories around a campfire despite Oscar's intense fears. Upon hearing the stories, ghosts suddenly appear which results in Oscar beginning to worry about different kinds of ghosts; all of which begin manifesting. Realizing that he must face his fears, Oscar tries to come up with a good ghost to defeat the other ones.
25	25	"I Heart Heartforde"	Alex Cline and Nick Edwards	Julia Pott, Emma Fletcher, Kent Osborne, and Sarah Lloyd	June 30, 2019	1068-032	0.42
The campers head to Heartforde, the only town on Summer Camp Island that is not magical. Oscar wants to get a normal tube of toothpaste to replace his talkative one, but finds that they are sold out. Now he and Hedgehog must run about the town to help everyone with finding or doing things so that he can get his toothpaste.
26	26	"Space Invasion"	Seo Kim and Aleks Sennwald	Julia Pott, Emma Fletcher, Kent Osborne, and Sarah Lloyd	June 30, 2019	1068-030	0.42
Puddle (voiced by Ethan Maher) and the King (voiced by Sam Lavagnino) are getting their castle repainted and decide to stay with Oscar until it is finished. Oscar shows off his hosting abilities, but soon becomes tired and overworked by the aliens' taking up his space. Hedgehog insists that he be honest about his feelings, but Oscar does not want to risk his friendship with them.
27	27	"Mom Soon"	Somvilay Xayaphone and Jesse Moynihan	Julia Pott, Kent Osborne, and Sarah Lloyd	June 30, 2019	1068-034	0.43
On Hedgehog's radio show, Hedgehog gets a call from Skadi (voiced by Betsy Sodaro), a cloud puncher who is having mommy issues. She and Oscar visit her and try to help her get in contact with her mother (voiced by Jane Lynch) to tell her about how many clouds he has punched. When she begins demeaning her, Skadi becomes sad and creates a "momsoon" that begins flooding the island.
28	28	"Sneeze Guard"	Kent Osborne and Alex Cline	Julia Pott, Emma Fletcher, Kent Osborne, and Sarah Lloyd	June 30, 2019	1068-025	0.43
Susie and Betsy (voiced by Nikki Castillo) discover that Alice is sick. The last time she caught an illness resulted in a terrible disaster that coated the island. Susie and Betsy are incapable of working closely together, so they put a spell on Oscar and Hedgehog to help them out. However, in their carelessness, Oscar and Hedgehog begin picking up on the witches' habits.
29	29	"Susie's Fantastical Scavenger Hunt"	Somvilay Xayaphone and Jesse Moynihan	Julia Pott, Kent Osborne, and Sarah Lloyd	July 7, 2019	1068-033	0.25
Susie creates a scavenger hunt for the campers to find her lost earrings. When pairing teams, Oscar gets set up with Lucy (voiced by Indie Nameth) and Hedgehog gets set up with Max. With Oscar inconsolable, Lucy decides to train him into being more independent from Hedgehog while Max decides to take Hedgehog to a hidden part of the island she has never visited before.
30	30	"Mop Forever"	Seo Kim and Aleks Sennwald	Julia Pott, Emma Fletcher, Kent Osborne, and Sarah Lloyd	July 7, 2019	1068-024	0.25
At Alice's dress-up party the campers are magically turned into their costumes. Unfortunately, this means that the witches are no longer witches and cannot use magic. However, Hedgehog can while Oscar is her mop. She begins abusing her abilities, but soon realizes that being a witch means having responsibilities to uphold on the island.
31	31	"Pajamas Party"	Thomas Herpich and Graham Falk	Julia Pott, Emma Fletcher, Kent Osborne, and Sarah Lloyd	July 7, 2019	1068-029	0.20
While celebrating Pajamas' birthday, she begins to worry about Oscar growing up without her. Hedgehog creates a spell that will allow Pajamas to grow with Oscar, but it instead causes Oscar to shrink back to a younger age. They visit a toad doctor (voiced by Bobby Moynihan) that can help Oscar return to his proper age, but Pajamas is unwilling to let her best friend go.
32	32	"The Soundhouse"	Aleks Sennwald and Seo Kim; Nick Edwards (additional storyboarder)	Julia Pott, Emma Fletcher, Kent Osborne, and Sarah Lloyd	July 7, 2019	1068-031	0.20
Hedgehog leads Oscar to the Soundhouse, a tall building by the sea run by Barb the elf (voiced by Whoopi Goldberg). Barb reveals that due to a series of circumstances, the Soundhouse will be incapable of protecting the island from the spotted bears. She has Hedgehog help repair parts of the dirty machine while Oscar tries to take care of a pterodactyl egg that is ready to hatch.
33	33	"Puff Paint"	Alex Cline and Nick Edwards	Julia Pott, Emma Fletcher, Kent Osborne, and Sarah Lloyd	July 14, 2019	1068-026	0.36
Oscar enters his painting (a simple picture of a dog sniffing a flower in a green field) into the local art gallery. The moon brings everyone's paintings to life which allows people to enter their worlds. Due to Oscar's "cute" painting, everyone seems to ignore it, resulting in him setting out to make himself into a great artist.
34	34	"Susie Appreciation Day"	Thomas Herpich and Graham Falk	Julia Pott, Emma Fletcher, Kent Osborne, and Sarah Lloyd	July 14, 2019	1068-037	0.36
It is Susie Appreciation Day in which Susie leaves on vacation. While Oscar and Hedgehog are fooling around, they accidentally end up in Susie's house and discover that she has a "staycation". They have to avoid getting caught, but discover that Susie has issues with Oscar and Hedgehog and learn more about her strained friendship with Ramona.
35	35	"Campers Above the Bed"	Aleks Sennwald and Seo Kim	Julia Pott, Emma Fletcher, Kent Osborne, and Sarah Lloyd	July 14, 2019	1057-008	0.36
Hedgehog has a crush on Max which she writes in her diary. The monster under the bed (voiced by Alfred Molina) steals it, forcing her and Oscar to go under the bed and into the monster's world. They learn that it is a whole society dedicated to Hedgehog's personal life horrifying her. Now she must get her diary back while also trying to protect Oscar from her secrets.
36	36	"Midnight Quittance"	Thomas Herpich and Graham Falk; Nick Edwards (additional storyboarder)	Julia Pott, Kent Osborne, and Sarah Lloyd	July 14, 2019	1068-035	0.36
Oscar and Hedgehog are invited to a ritual by Ramona and the monsters. The ritual is to feed a very special soup to Time (voiced by Kevin Michael Richardson), as before time used to be random, but by giving him soup, time is straightforward. However, the ritual gets ruined by the fact that Oscar forgot to bring salt to the table and gets sleepy as the ritual is far past midnight.
37	37	"The Great Elf Invention Convention"	Alex Cline and Nick Edwards	Julia Pott, Kent Osborne, and Sarah Lloyd	July 21, 2019	1068-036	0.40
Oscar, Max, and Hedgehog are hungry and head to the mess hall, only to discover that the elves are using it for an Invention Convention (which mostly consists of social actions). Barb asks that she help with her daughters (voiced by Rachel Dratch, Wanda Sykes and Roz Ryan respectively) getting ideas by using the thinking cap. The kids sympathize with them and start abusing the cap until it is destroyed.
38	38	"Twelve Angry Hedgehogs"	Alex Cline and Nick Edwards	Julia Pott, Emma Fletcher, Kent Osborne, and Sarah Lloyd	July 21, 2019	1068-040	0.40
Hedgehog wants to win the Golden Science Badge and gives Oscar a random formula for his banana. Purely by accident, Oscar ends up winning the badge when he discovers cloning, making Hedgehog jealous. In her frustration, Hedgehog accidentally clones herself and the clones become violent, forcing Hedgehog to use her invention.
39	39	"Spell Crushers"	Aleks Sennwald and Seo Kim; Nick Edwards (additional storyboarder)	Julia Pott, Emma Fletcher, Kent Osborne, and Sarah Lloyd	July 21, 2019	1068-039	0.37
As Hedgehog prepares for Betsy's witch exam, she suddenly finds herself unable to focus because of her crush on Max. She tries different remedies to overcome her nervousness around him, but to no avail. Ultimately, Barb tells her that in order for her to overcome her feelings she needs to be honest with him and face acceptance or rejection.
40	40	"The Library"	Jesse Moynihan and Somvilay Xayaphone; Nick Edwards (additional storyboarder)	Julia Pott, Sarah Lloyd, and Kent Osborne	July 21, 2019	1068-038	0.37
On a rainy day, Oscar, Hedgehog, Pepper, Lucy and Alexa (voiced by Alexa Nisenson) head to the library to get in on some reading. While Oscar tries to earn his special library membership badge by performing various tasks, Hedgehog desperately wants to get a special dictionary so that she can learn one single word, but is unable to due to Stuart (voiced by Stephen Root) having the book.

=== Season 2 (2020) ===
No. overall	No. in season	Title	Written and storyboarded by	Story by	Original release date	Cartoon Network air date	Prod. code	U.S. linear viewers (millions)
41	1	"Meeting of the Minds"	Thomas Herpich and Graham Falk	Julia Pott, Sarah Lloyd, Leah Beckmann, and Kent Osborne	June 18, 2020	June 19, 2023	045	N/A
While Oscar helps Hedgehog find her wand, Susie tries to convince the Meeting of the Minds that Hedgehog isn't responsible enough for magic.
42	2	"Ava's Yard Sale"	Somvilay Xayaphone and Hanna Nystrom	Julia Pott, Sarah Lloyd, Emma Fletcher, and Kent Osborne	June 18, 2020	June 19, 2023	042	N/A
To help Ava (voiced by Fortune Feimster) overcome stage fright, Hedgehog takes Ava's violin into her own hands, while Oscar calls in for some reinforcements.
43	3	"Molar Moles"	Graham Falk and Thomas Herpich	Julia Pott, Sarah Lloyd, Emma Fletcher, and Kent Osborne	June 18, 2020	June 20, 2023	041	0.08
Oscar's fib about his last baby tooth alerts the Molar Mole Fraud Squad, and Hedgehog jumps to his defense at a kooky mole trial.
44	4	"Tortilla Towel"	Ako Castuera and Aleks Sennwald	Julia Pott, Sarah Lloyd, and Kent Osborne	June 18, 2020	June 20, 2023	044	0.08
After making Oscar's tortilla towel dreams come true, he and Hedgehog find that running a business is harder than they thought.
45	5	"Acorn Graduation"	Aleks Sennwald and Seo Kim	Julia Pott, Sarah Lloyd, Leah Beckmann, Emma Fletcher, and Kent Osborne	June 18, 2020	June 21, 2023	048	N/A
Hedgehog endures her first magic lesson with Susie, while Oscar sets out to save her seat for a must-see event: Acorn Graduation!
46	6	"Dungeon Doug"	Somvilay Xayaphone and Ako Castuera	Julia Pott, Sarah Lloyd, Leah Beckmann, Emma Fletcher, and Kent Osborne	June 18, 2020	June 21, 2023	046	N/A
On a trip into the world of Dungeon Doug, Oscar and his dad (voiced by Alfred Molina) find themselves on a father-son bonding mission.
47	7	"Tub on the Run"	Alex Cline and Hanna Nystrom	Julia Pott, Sarah Lloyd, Leah Beckmann, and Kent Osborne	June 18, 2020	June 22, 2023	055	0.12
While Hedgehog and Max scour the island in search of a missing bathtub (voiced by Bobby Moynihan), everyone is dying to know: are things weird between them?
48	8	"Spotted Bear Stretch"	Graham Falk and Thomas Herpich	Julia Pott, Sarah Lloyd, Leah Beckmann, and Kent Osborne	June 18, 2020	June 22, 2023	050	0.12
On the eve of the Spotted Bear Stretch, Oscar and his pajamas are stuck at Susie's place as unwelcome house guests.
49	9	"French Toasting"	Alex Cline and Nick Edwards	Julia Pott, Sarah Lloyd, Emma Fletcher, and Kent Osborne	June 18, 2020	June 23, 2023	043	N/A
Lucy's suspicious behavior prompts Oscar and Hedgehog to investigate whether or not she's the kingpin of a secret society.
50	10	"We'll Just Move the Stars"	Aleks Sennwald and Seo Kim	Julia Pott, Sarah Lloyd, Leah Beckmann, and Kent Osborne	June 18, 2020	June 23, 2023	056	N/A
When an astrological mismatch threatens King and Puddle's wedding, Oscar and Hedgehog join them on a quest to ensure love conquers all.
51	11	"Catacombs"	Ryan Pequin and Hanna Nystrom	Julia Pott, Sarah Lloyd, Leah Beckmann, and Kent Osborne	June 18, 2020	June 26, 2023	058	N/A
Oscar, Hedgehog, Lucy, and Saxophone must return a yeti comb to its home to save the island from a really bad hair day.
52	12	"Wild Hearts Can't Be Caboodled"	Alex Cline and Vitaly Strokous	Julia Pott, Sarah Lloyd, Leah Beckmann, and Kent Osborne	June 18, 2020	June 26, 2023	049	N/A
Things get wonky when Oscar and Hedgehog use magic to get an edge on their fellow campers in the Rainbow Unicorn Badge contest.
53	13	"The Later Pile"	Kent Osborne and Alex Cline	Julia Pott, Sarah Lloyd, Leah Beckmann, and Kent Osborne	June 18, 2020	June 27, 2023	052	N/A
Hedgehog convinces Oscar to return an overdue video -- but this time, Oscar's procrastination habit has spooky consequences.
54	14	"Honeydew Hatch"	Somvilay Xayaphone and Jesse Moynihan	Julia Pott, Sarah Lloyd, Leah Beckmann, and Kent Osborne	June 18, 2020	June 27, 2023	051	N/A
Oscar and Hedgehog enter Frozen Time with the help of Ramona grow time babies, but Ramona and Susie's broken friendship causes problems.
55	15	"Light as a Feather"	Somvilay Xayaphone and Jesse Moynihan	Julia Pott, Sarah Lloyd, Leah Beckmann, and Kent Osborne	June 18, 2020	June 28, 2023	054	N/A
While Hedgehog braves her first witch coven sleepover, Oscar awaits a secret signal in case she needs to be rescued.
56	16	"When Harry Met Barry"	Kent Osborne and Aleks Sennwald	Julia Pott, Sarah Lloyd, Leah Beckmann, and Kent Osborne	June 18, 2020	June 28, 2023	060	N/A
Faced with two potential husbands -- burly Harry (voiced by Steve Berg) and sensitive Barry (voiced by Wallace Shawn) -- Barb enlists Hedgehog and Oscar to help her weigh her options.
57	17	"Oddjobs"	Thomas Herpich and Graham Falk	Julia Pott, Sarah Lloyd, Leah Beckmann, and Kent Osborne	June 18, 2020	June 29, 2023	053	N/A
Hedgehog and Oscar investigate problems at the U.M.P.S. and meet the new intern, Oddjobs (voiced by Aparna Nancherla), who's a great friend but a terrible employee.
58	18	"Tumble Dry Low"	Aleks Sennwald and Seo Kim	Julia Pott, Sarah Lloyd, Leah Beckmann, Emma Fletcher, and Kent Osborne	June 18, 2020	June 29, 2023	047	N/A
When Hedgehog's podcast blows up, she must decide whether to ride the wave of fame or stay true to her small but loyal fan base.
59	19	"Just You and Me"	Somvilay Xayaphone and Jesse Moynihan	Julia Pott, Sarah Lloyd, Leah Beckmann, and Kent Osborne	June 18, 2020	June 30, 2023	059	N/A
The full moon finds Betsy withholding her big werewolf secret from Susie, who spends the night trying to figure out what her BFF is up to.
60	20	"Glow Worm"	Graham Falk and Thomas Herpich	Julia Pott, Sarah Lloyd, Leah Beckmann, and Kent Osborne	June 18, 2020	June 30, 2023	057	N/A
While Hedgehog is off "werewolfing", a deflated Oscar has a therapy session with Shark (voiced by Richard Kind) that helps him realize the magic within him.

=== Season 3 (2020) ===
No. overall	No. in season	Title	Written and storyboarded by	Story by	Original release date	Cartoon Network air date	Prod. code	U.S. linear viewers (millions)
Susie and Ramona
61	1	"Susie and Ramona Chapter 1: Susie's Ark"	Hanna Nystrom and Aleks Sennwald	Julia Pott, Sarah Lloyd, and Kent Osborne	December 10, 2020	July 3, 2023	061	N/A
When Susie learns magic is beginning to disappear from New York, she tries to lead all the magical creatures to safety.
62	2	"Susie and Ramona Chapter 2: Ghost Baby Jabberwock"	Graham Falk and Thomas Herpich	Julia Pott, Sarah Lloyd, Emma Fletcher, and Kent Osborne	December 10, 2020	July 3, 2023	062	N/A
Susie, Ramona, and Barb team up in frozen time to see what's threatening magic.
63	3	"Susie and Ramona Chapter 3: Meet Me in Massachusetts"	Jesse Balmer and Seo Kim	Julia Pott, Sarah Lloyd, Emma Fletcher, and Kent Osborne	December 10, 2020	July 3, 2023	063	N/A
Decades pass and Susie and Ramona train a gaggle of witches until they have a full coven. When the 13th witch, Betsy, arrives, Susie and Ramona can finally learn what's the last step in their quest to restore magic. They learn that Ramona has to stay in Frozen Time until magic is restored in the world.
64	4	"Susie and Ramona Chapter 4: Witches in the City"	Ako Castuera and Ryan Pequin	Julia Pott, Sarah Lloyd, Emma Fletcher, and Kent Osborne	December 10, 2020	July 3, 2023	064	N/A
Ramona sends Susie back to New York in search of new magical creatures.
Puddle and the King
65	5	"Puddle and the King Chapter 1: Honey Moondog"	Jim Campbell and Ryan Pequin	Julia Pott, Sarah Lloyd, Emma Fletcher, and Kent Osborne	December 17, 2020	July 5, 2023	070	N/A
The king leaves Hedgehog and Oscar in charge of the kingdom while he and Puddle are away on their honeymoon - their only duty is to carry out the Swan-Upping.
66	6	"Puddle and the King Chapter 2: Royally Bored"	Thomas Herpich and Graham Falk	Julia Pott, Sarah Lloyd, Emma Fletcher, and Kent Osborne	December 17, 2020	July 5, 2023	071	N/A
Hedgehog and Oscar discover alien jesters who live under the floorboards of the castle.
67	7	"Puddle and the King Chapter 3: All the King's Slides"	Jesse Balmer and Abby Magno	Julia Pott, Sarah Lloyd, Emma Fletcher, and Kent Osborne	December 17, 2020	July 6, 2023	072	N/A
Oscar, Hedgehog and Puddle must figure out what's wrong with the King when he orders the aliens to turn all the planet's sugar into salt.
Yeti Confetti
68	8	"Yeti Confetti Chapter One: Don't Tell Lucy"	Hanna Nystrom and Aleks Sennwald	Julia Pott, Sarah Lloyd, Emma Fletcher, and Kent Osborne	December 24, 2020	July 6, 2023	065	N/A
Oscar has to distract Lucy while the Yetis prepare a surprise for her.
69	9	"Yeti Confetti Chapter Two: The Yum Whisperer"	Thomas Herpich and Graham Falk	Julia Pott, Sarah Lloyd, Emma Fletcher, and Kent Osborne	December 24, 2020	July 7, 2023	066	N/A
Lucy and a young yeti named Fife (voiced by Jason Maybaum) argue about the right way to raise a litter of baby yetis they found.
70	10	"Yeti Confetti Chapter Three: The Sherbet Scoop"	Haewon Lee and Jesse Balmer	Julia Pott, Sarah Lloyd, Emma Fletcher, and Kent Osborne	December 24, 2020	July 7, 2023	067	N/A
Lucy decides to tell a story during a Yeti cloud-making ceremony about Bassoon (voiced by Doug Benson), a Yeti Elder she does not know.
71	11	"Yeti Confetti Chapter Four: Lucy's Instrument"	Ryan Pequin and James Campbell	Julia Pott, Sarah Lloyd, Emma Fletcher, and Kent Osborne	December 24, 2020	July 10, 2023	068	0.08
Lucy goes to Yeti school to find her instrument.
72	12	"Yeti Confetti Chapter Five: Where's the Confetti"	Aleks Sennwald and Michael Sweater	Julia Pott, Sarah Lloyd, Emma Fletcher, and Kent Osborne	December 24, 2020	July 10, 2023	069	0.08
When it doesn't snow on the final day of Yeti Confetti, a Yeti Elder Lithophone (voiced by Keith David) blames Lucy. In order to prove she belongs Lucy tries to find a way to make it snow.

=== Season 4 (2021) ===
No. overall	No. in season	Title	Written and storyboarded by	Story by	Original release date	Cartoon Network air date	Prod. code	U.S. linear viewers (millions)
73	1	"Sea Bunnies"	Julian Glander	J.R. Phillips and Julian Glander	June 17, 2021	July 11, 2023	1094-084	0.09
Shortly after discovering an underwater portal, Oscar learns that his return ticket is an errand for Susie. Note: This episode was produced using CGI animation.
74	2	"Mushrumours"	Alabaster Pizzo, Abby Magno and Jesse Balmer	Julia Pott, Sarah Lloyd, Emma Fletcher, and Kent Osborne	June 17, 2021	July 11, 2023	077	0.09
Alice suffers the consequences of accidentally spreading a rumor about mushrooms.
75	3	"Breakfast like Gene Kelly"	Aleks Sennwald and Alabaster Pizzo	Julia Pott, Sarah Lloyd, Emma Fletcher, and Kent Osborne	June 17, 2021	July 12, 2023	073	N/A
Oscar attempts to make the breakfast of his dreams.
76	4	"Spirit Balls"	Abby Magno and Jesse Balmer	Julia Pott, Sarah Lloyd, Emma Fletcher, and Kent Osborne	June 17, 2021	July 12, 2023	075	N/A
Susie and Ramona teach the witches how to make spirit balls. Note: This episode is set during the "Susie and Ramona" story arc of Season 3.
77	5	"Oscar & His Demon"	Thomas Herpich and Graham Falk	Kent Osborne	June 17, 2021	July 13, 2023	074	0.10
Oscar works to overcome his fear of crossing a very scary bridge.
78	6	"The Emily Ghost Institute for Manners and Magical Etiquette"	Aleks Sennwald and Alabaster Pizzo	Julia Pott, Sarah Lloyd, Leah Beckmann, Emma Fletcher, and Kent Osborne	June 17, 2021	July 13, 2023	080	0.10
Oscar and Hedgehog go to a magical etiquette class.
79	7	"Jeremiah"	Kent Osborne and Michael Sweater	Thomas Herpich, Julia Pott, Sarah Lloyd, Emma Fletcher, and Kent Osborne	June 17, 2021	July 14, 2023	078	0.12
Oscar finds and cares for a magical mandrake named Jeremiah (voiced by Max Mitchell) from Susie's yard.
80	8	"Tomorrow's Bananas"	Alabaster Pizzo and Lucyola Langi	Julia Pott, Sarah Lloyd, Carey O'Donnell, Kent Osborne, and Jack Pendarvis	June 17, 2021	July 14, 2023	1094-100	0.12
Oscar and Hedgehog get an unsettling glimpse into the future.
81	9	"Shave a Little off the Wheel"	Thomas Herpich	Sarah Lloyd	June 17, 2021	July 17, 2023	1094-098	N/A
A mouse in heels Cookiesmell (voiced by Danny Pudi) befriends a rogue snowflake (voiced by Lolly Adefope).
82	10	"He's Just Not Here Right Now"	Jim Campbell and Nathan Bulmer	Julia Pott, Sarah Lloyd, Carey O'Donnell, Kent Osborne, and Jack Pendarvis	June 17, 2021	July 17, 2023	1094-097	N/A
Oscar and Hedgehog encounter New Jersey's most famous piece of folklore.
83	11	"Hark the Gerald Sings"	Matthew Houston and Jim Campbell	Julia Pott, Sarah Lloyd, Carey O'Donnell, Kent Osborne, and Jack Pendarvis	June 17, 2021	July 18, 2023	1094-099	0.07
Oscar confronts an age-old superstition (voiced by Bob Balaban).
84	12	"Hall of Mooms"	Jesse Balmer and Abby Magno	Julia Pott, Sarah Lloyd, Emma Fletcher, and Kent Osborne	June 17, 2021	July 18, 2023	076	0.07
Hedgehog, accompanied by Oscar, undertakes a short expedition to acquire her first broom. In the process, she also excavates and overcomes a deep vein of intergenerational trauma.
85	13	"Pepper and the Fog"	Graham Falk	Julia Pott, Sarah Lloyd, Emma Fletcher, and Kent Osborne	June 17, 2021	July 19, 2023	079	N/A
In this tribute to Yuri Norstein's animated short film Hedgehog in the Fog, Pepper attempts to make it to Susie's house after the island gets covered in fog.

=== Season 5 (2021) ===
No. overall	No. in season	Title	Written and storyboarded by	Story by	Original release date	Cartoon Network air date	Prod. code	U.S. linear viewers (millions)
Barb and the Spotted Bears
86	1	"Barb and the Spotted Bears Chapter 1: A Barb is Born"	Alabaster Pizzo and Lucyola Langi	Julia Pott, Sarah Lloyd, Kent Osborne, Jack Pendarvis, and Niki Yang	December 9, 2021	July 19, 2023	1094-081	N/A
On the third day of the world, Barb tries to save the ferns from being eaten by the spotted bears. But the bears are only getting hungrier and hungrier - will Barb be able to stop the ferns from going extinct?
87	2	"Barb and the Spotted Bears Chapter 2: Hot Milk and Careless Whispers"	Graham Falk and Thomas Herpich	Julia Pott, Sarah Lloyd, Kent Osborne, Jack Pendarvis, and Niki Yang	December 9, 2021	July 20, 2023	1094-082	0.09
Barb tries to soothe the spotted bears with a dreamy invention, but soon finds herself outnumbered. Will Barb be able to even the playing field - or will she become the bears' next snack?
88	3	"Barb and the Spotted Bears Chapter 3: Nightcap"	Jesse Balmer and Abby Magno	Julia Pott, Sarah Lloyd, Carey O'Donnell, Kent Osborne, Jack Pendarvis, and Niki Yang	December 9, 2021	July 20, 2023	1094-083	0.09
Barb and the elves band together to protect the source of all magic from a pair of fiendish intruders (voiced by Kate Berlant and John Early). But will Barb be able to outsmart two rascals as old as the world itself?
Betsy and the Ghost
89	4	"Betsy and the Ghost Chapter 1: Burp n' Sighs"	Alabaster Pizzo and Lucyola Langi	Julia Pott, Sarah Lloyd, Carey O'Donnell, Kent Osborne and Jack Pendarvis	December 9, 2021	July 21, 2023	1094-091	0.14
On the eve of Ramona's exile to Frozen Time, Susie tries to get rid of the sad memory of their relationship, but soon finds herself haunted by the past.
90	5	"Betsy and the Ghost Chapter 2: Boo Jeans"	Abby Magno and Jesse Balmer	Julia Pott, Sarah Lloyd, Carey O'Donnell, Kent Osborne and Jack Pendarvis	December 9, 2021	July 21, 2023	1094-092	0.14
It's Betsy's first night on Summer Camp Island, and she's looking forward to a cozy evening in with a nice cup of tea. But when Alice convinces her to participate in an initiation ritual, Betsy gets lost in the woods.
91	6	"Betsy and the Ghost Chapter 3: There's a Racket In My Hope Chest"	Abby Magno and Jesse Balmer	Julia Pott, Sarah Lloyd, Carey O'Donnell, Kent Osborne and Jack Pendarvis	December 9, 2021	July 24, 2023	1094-093	N/A
The witches search for Betsy - who doesn't want to be found. Can she learn to love being a witch as much as she loves being a ghost?
Susie and her Sister
92	7	"Susie and her Sister Chapter 1: Heathers"	Thomas Herpich and Graham Falk	Julia Pott, Sarah Lloyd, Carey O'Donnell, Kent Osborne and Jack Pendarvis	December 9, 2021	July 24, 2023	1094-085	N/A
Susie's new little sister Mildred (voiced by Faye Larkin) has a gift for magic, but it's causing problems for the community. Will Susie learn to accept that Mildred is more powerful, and will the townsfolk be able to accept the most powerful witch in the world?
93	8	"Susie and her Sister Chapter 2: Hot Corn Girls"	Thomas Herpich and Graham Falk	Julia Pott, Sarah Lloyd, Carey O'Donnell, Kent Osborne and Jack Pendarvis	December 9, 2021	July 25, 2023	1094-086	N/A
On her 15th birthday, Susie must prepare for her Gibbous Rite Ceremony. Will Mildred be able to keep her chaotic magic in check for just one day so Susie can become the full witch woman of her dreams?
94	9	"Susie and her Sister Chapter 3: Mildred's Friend"	Abby Magno and Jesse Balmer	Julia Pott, Sarah Lloyd, Carey O'Donnell, Kent Osborne and Jack Pendarvis	December 9, 2021	July 25, 2023	1094-087	N/A
Locked in a standoff with Susie over who will say sorry first, Mildred runs away to the woods and befriends a ghost. Will one of the McCallister sisters give in and apologize before the townsfolk run Mildred out of town?
Oscar and the Monsters
95	10	"Oscar and the Monsters Chapter 1: Unaccompanied Oscar"	Alabaster Pizzo and Lucyola Langi	Julia Pott, Sarah Lloyd, Carey O'Donnell, and Kent Osborne	December 9, 2021	July 26, 2023	1094-088	N/A
When Oscar isn't invited to Alexa's birthday party, Mortimer (voiced by Bobby Moynihan) tries to make him feel better by telling him about a similar time in his life. Ever the glow worm, Oscar sneaks back in time to help a young Mortimer overcome the sad experience.
96	11	"Oscar and the Monsters Chapter 2: Tiny Outburst Society"	Jim Campbell and Ryan Pequin	Julia Pott, Sarah Lloyd, Carey O'Donnell, Kent Osborne and Jack Pendarvis	December 9, 2021	July 26, 2023	1094-089	N/A
After discovering that young Mortimer doesn't have any friends, Oscar helps him start a new club on campus. But the monsters are forced to hide their newfound friendship from the school - and Stuart.
97	12	"Oscar and the Monsters Chapter 3: Witches' Brew"	Lucyola Langi and Alabaster Pizzo	Julia Pott, Sarah Lloyd, Carey O'Donnell, Kent Osborne and Jack Pendarvis	December 9, 2021	July 27, 2023	1094-090	N/A
Mortimer and the monsters must figure out how to send Oscar back to his own time, but the only person that can help is the foe of monsters everywhere: a witch (voiced by Kate Dickie). Will they all be able to work together to get Oscar back to Hedgehog?
The Babies
98	13	"The Babies Chapter 1: Breakfast Errands"	Kent Osborne and Jim Campbell	Julia Pott, Sarah Lloyd, Carey O'Donnell, Kent Osborne and Jack Pendarvis	December 9, 2021	July 27, 2023	1094-094	N/A
Frustrated that he doesn't know his magical identity, Oliver (voiced by Andre Robinson) convinces Susie to tell him by means of nonviolent protest. Not wanting anyone in her house, Susie takes Oliver on a series of errands to help him figure it out.
99	14	"The Babies Chapter 2: Teacup Giant"	Jesse Balmer and Abby Magno	Julia Pott, Sarah Lloyd, Carey O'Donnell, Kent Osborne and Jack Pendarvis	December 9, 2021	July 28, 2023	1094-095	N/A
Susie sends Alexa to the Fjords to train as a giant, but her small size causes her to lag behind. Will Alexa be able to fake it until she makes it - or are these boots too enormous to fill?
100	15	"The Babies Chapter 3: Lem Is Nothing"	Graham Falk	Julia Pott, Sarah Lloyd, Carey O'Donnell, Kent Osborne and Jack Pendarvis	December 9, 2021	July 28, 2023	1094-096	N/A
After landing in trouble with Susie, Lem (voiced by Mykal-Michelle Harris, previously voiced by Daphne Thomas in Season 1 and Mattea Quin in 2 seasons) runs away to Frozen Time to hide at Ramona's but is soon sniffed out by the fearsome Jabberwock. Later, Lem must decide whose wrath is worse: that of the Jabberwock, or a very grumpy Susie.

=== Season 6 (2023) ===
No. overall	No. in season	Title	Written and storyboarded by	Story by	Original release date	Prod. code	U.S. viewers (millions)
101	1	"The Legs"	Lucyola Langi and Alabaster Pizzo	Julia Pott, Sarah Lloyd, Kent Osborne, Jack Pendarvis and Quinn Scott	July 31, 2023	101	N/A
Susie must rely on Oscar and Hedgehog in unimaginable ways after a magic trick gone wrong.
102	2	"If I Only Had a Wand"	Abby Magno and Jesse Balmer	Julia Pott, Sarah Lloyd, Kent Osborne, Jack Pendarvis and Quinn Scott	July 31, 2023	102	N/A
Hedgehog reckons with her mother’s disapproval of magic.
103	3	"See Bees? Gee! Bees!"	Thomas Herpich and Graham Falk	Julia Pott, Sarah Lloyd, Kent Osborne, Jack Pendarvis and Quinn Scott	August 1, 2023	103	N/A
Oscar heads to the Sasquatch Monastery in search of enlightenment.
104	4	"Pepper's Funeral"	Jim Campbell	Julia Pott, Sarah Lloyd, Kent Osborne, Jack Pendarvis and Quinn Scott	August 1, 2023	104	N/A
With help from Pepper, Susie is able to lay a special dream of hers to rest.
105	5	"The Hits"	Alabaster Pizzo and Lucyola Langi	Julia Pott, Sarah Lloyd, Kent Osborne, Jack Pendarvis and Quinn Scott	August 2, 2023	105	N/A
Barb and the Alien King take an eventful walk around the island.
106	6	"Miracle Rabbit"	Jesse Balmer and Abby Magno	Julia Pott, Sarah Lloyd, Kent Osborne, Jack Pendarvis and Quinn Scott	August 2, 2023	106	N/A
Oscar and Ramona run an errand on the moon.
107	7	"The Three Grrs"	Thomas Herpich and Graham Falk	Julia Pott, Sarah Lloyd, Kent Osborne, Jack Pendarvis and Quinn Scott	August 3, 2023	107	N/A
Oscar helps the aliens with a special jester ritual that happens once every fifty years.
108	8	"Go Get Our Girls"	Jim Campbell and Ako Castuera	Julia Pott, Sarah Lloyd, Kent Osborne, Jack Pendarvis and Quinn Scott	August 3, 2023	108	N/A
Hedgehog and Oscar go in search of the missing coven members.
109	9	"Storybook Susie"	Graham Falk and Thomas Herpich	Julia Pott, Sarah Lloyd, Kent Osborne, Jack Pendarvis and Quinn Scott	August 4, 2023	109	N/A
Susie tells the story of her travels around the world.
110	10	"The Last Witch"	Alabaster Pizzo and Lucyola Langi	Julia Pott, Sarah Lloyd, Kent Osborne and Quinn Scott	August 4, 2023	110	N/A
Hedgehog worries that she may be too little to make big witch decisions.
111	11	"The Metaphysical Reserve"	Abby Magno and Jesse Balmer	Julia Pott, Sarah Lloyd, Kent Osborne and Quinn Scott	August 7, 2023	111	N/A
Susie steps through a portal into another realm.
112	12	"Night's Pockets"	Graham Falk and Thomas Herpich	Julia Pott, Sarah Lloyd, Kent Osborne, Jack Pendarvis and Quinn Scott	August 7, 2023	112	N/A
Pajamas and Jimjams try to find Time.
113	13	"Jar Guard"	Abby Magno and Jesse Balmer	Julia Pott, Sarah Lloyd, Kent Osborne, Jack Pendarvis and Quinn Scott	August 8, 2023	113	N/A
Mildred's friend tells a cautionary tale.
114	14	"Bear With Me"	Jim Campbell and Ako Castuera	Julia Pott, Sarah Lloyd, Kent Osborne, Jack Pendarvis and Quinn Scott	August 8, 2023	114	N/A
A surprise visitor arrives on the island.
115	15	"Croissant Moon"	Alabaster Pizzo and Lucyola Langi	Julia Pott, Sarah Lloyd, Kent Osborne and Quinn Scott	August 9, 2023	115	N/A
The magical creatures work together to send Mildred on a mission so they can have a special bedtime.
116	16	"Retrace Our Hooves"	Graham Falk and Thomas Herpich	Julia Pott, Sarah Lloyd, Kent Osborne, Jack Pendarvis and Quinn Scott	August 9, 2023	116	N/A
Susie makes contact in another realm.
117	17	"Meeting of the Mounds"	Abby Magno and Jesse Balmer	Julia Pott, Sarah Lloyd, Kent Osborne, Jack Pendarvis and Quinn Scott	August 10, 2023	117	N/A
The Coven challenges The Cuties to an impromptu softball game.
118	18	"Swellington Boots"	Alabaster Pizzo and Lucyola Langi	Julia Pott, Sarah Lloyd, Kent Osborne and Quinn Scott	August 10, 2023	118	N/A
When a summer storm brews, the crew cozies up in the library.
119	19	"Weather Your Weather"	Jim Campbell, Abby Magno and Jesse Balmer	Julia Pott, Sarah Lloyd, Kent Osborne, Jack Pendarvis and Quinn Scott	August 11, 2023	119	0.08
Susie mulls over her past.
120	20	"It Takes Time"	Thomas Herpich and Graham Falk	Julia Pott, Sarah Lloyd, Kent Osborne and Quinn Scott	August 11, 2023	120	0.08
The island welcomes a new era.
