= Liff =

Liff or LIFF may refer to:

== People with the family name ==
- Biff Liff (1919-2015), Tony Award-winning American Broadway manager and producer.
- Vincent Liff (1915-2003), American film director from West Hartford, Connecticut.

== Other ==
- Liff, Angus, village in Scotland
- The Meaning of Liff, a book by Douglas Adams and John Lloyd

== LIFF as abbreviation ==
- Ladakh International Film Festival, India
- Layered Image File Format
- Leeds International Film Festival, West Yorkshire, England
- Leiden International Film Festival, The Netherlands
- Ljubljana International Film Festival, Slovenia
- London Independent Film Festival, London, England
