= Tony Honors for Excellence in Theatre =

Non-competitive theatre award

The Tony Honors for Excellence in Theatre is a non-competitive award created by the American Theatre Wing in 1990. They are presented to institutions, individuals and/or organizations that have demonstrated extraordinary achievement in theatre, but are not eligible to compete in any of the established Tony Award categories. The Tony Honors "are announced in the autumn, and they are bestowed at a separate ceremony that affords recipients a special moment in the spotlight." As explained in Playbill, "In 2003, a new tradition began for the Tony Honors, which were previously announced during the Tony Awards broadcast. Last year, however, the Honors were presented in the fall..."

The first recipient was Alfred Drake, who was recognized for his lengthy career in musical theatre.

== Recipients ==
| Year | Recipient | Notes |
|---|---|---|
| 1990 | Alfred Drake | |
| 1991 | Father George Moore | Pastor of St. Malachy's Church (known as The Actors' Chapel) "for his service and commitment to the needy and elderly of the theater district and improving conditions in the Times Square area." |
| 1992 | Tom Jones and Harvey Schmidt | In commemoration for The Fantasticks, achieving its 33rd year Off-Broadway. |
| 1993 | International Alliance of Theatrical Stage Employees | |
| 1993 | Broadway Cares/Equity Fights AIDS | The entertainment industry's most active charity addressing the challenges of AIDS. |
| 1994 | Not Awarded | |
| 1995 | National Endowment for the Arts | |
| 1996 | Not Awarded | |
| 1997 | Not Awarded | |
| 1998 | The International Theatre Institute of the United States | |
| 1999 | Not Awarded | |
| 2000 | Eileen Heckart | |
| 2000 | Sylvia Herscher | Theatrical Agent & Music Publisher |
| 2000 | City Center Encores! | |
| 2001 | Betty Corwin | Founder and director of the Theatre on Film and Tape Archive of the New York Public Library for the Performing Arts |
| 2001 | New Dramatists | |
| 2001 | Theatre World | |
| 2002 | Not Awarded | |
| 2003 | The principal ensemble of Baz Luhrmann's La Bohème | |
| 2003 | Paul Huntley | Wig and hair stylist |
| 2003 | Johnson-Liff Casting Associates | Run by Geoffrey Johnson and Vincent Liff |
| 2003 | The Acting Company. | |
| 2004 | The cast of the 2003 Broadway production of Big River | Produced by the Roundabout Theatre Company and Deaf West Theatre |
| 2004 | Nancy Coyne | Chief executive of theatrical advertising agency Serino Coyne |
| 2004 | Frances and Harry Edelstein | Restaurateurs, owner of Cafe Edison |
| 2004 | Vincent Sardi Jr. | Restaurateur, owner of Sardi's |
| 2004 | Martha Swope | Photographer |
| 2005 | Peter Neufeld | Theatrical company manager, theater manager, and producer |
| 2005 | Theatre Communications Group. | |
| 2006 | BMI Lehman Engel Musical Theater Workshop | |
| 2006 | Forbidden Broadway and its creator, Gerard Alessandrini | |
| 2006 | Samuel Liff | |
| 2006 | Ellen Stewart. | |
| 2007 | Gemze de Lappe | |
| 2007 | Alyce Gilbert | Wardrobe Supervisor |
| 2007 | Neil Mazzella | CEO of Hudson Scenic Studios, a scene shop |
| 2007 | Seymour "Red" Press | Musician and musical contractor |
| 2008 | Not Awarded | |
| 2009 | Shirley Herz | Press agent |
| 2010 | The Alliance of Resident Theatres New York | |
| 2010 | B.H. Barry | Teacher |
| 2010 | Tom Viola | BC/EFA executive director. |
| 2011 | William Berloni | Animal trainer |
| 2011 | The Drama Book Shop | |
| 2011 | Sharon Jensen and Alliance for Inclusion in the Arts | |
| 2012 | Freddie Gershon | Entertainment attorney |
| 2012 | Artie Siccardi | Technical supervisor |
| 2012 | the TDF Open Doors Program | |
| 2013 | Michael Bloomberg | NYC Mayor |
| 2013 | Career Transition For Dancers | |
| 2013 | William "Bill" Craver | Literary Agent |
| 2013 | Peter Lawrence | Production Stage Manager |
| 2013 | The Lost Colony | Historical outdoor drama produced since 1937 in Manteo, North Carolina |
| 2013 | Sophia Gennusa, Oona Laurence, Bailey Ryon and Milly Shapiro | The four actresses who share the lead in Matilda the Musical. |
| 2014 | Joseph P. Benincasa | Actors Fund of America President |
| 2014 | Joan Marcus | Photographer |
| 2014 | Charlotte Wilcox | General manager |
| 2015 | Arnold Abramson | Scenic designer |
| 2015 | Adrian Bryan-Brown | Public relations consultant |
| 2015 | Gene O'Donovan | Theatre technician |
| 2016 | Seth Gelblum | Entertainment attorney |
| 2016 | Joan Lader | Vocal coach |
| 2016 | Sally Ann Parsons | Costume shop proprietor |
| 2017 | General managers Nina Lannan and Alan Wasser | |
| 2018 | Sara Krulwich | New York Times photographer |
| 2018 | Bessie Nelson | Costume beader |
| 2018 | Ernest Winzer Cleaners | |
| 2019 | Broadway Inspirational Voices | |
| 2019 | Peter Entin | Retired vice president of Theatre Operations for the Shubert Organization |
| 2019 | Joseph Blakely Forbes | Founder and president of Scenic Art Studios, Inc, a Scenic painting shop |
| 2019 | FDNY Engine 54, Ladder 4, Battalion 9 | |
| 2021 | Delayed due to COVID-19 Pandemic | |
| 2021 | Fred Gallo | President of PRG Scenic Technologies, a scene shop |
| 2021 | Irene Gandy | Press agent & Producer |
| 2021 | Beverly Jenkins | Stage manager |
| 2021 | New Federal Theatre | |
| 2022 | Asian American Performers Action Coalition | |
| 2022 | Broadway for All | |
| 2022 | Emily Grishman | Music copyist |
| 2022 | Feinstein's/54 Below | |
| 2022 | United Scenic Artists (Local USA 829, IATSE) | |
| 2023 | Lisa Dawn Cave | Stage manager |
| 2023 | Victoria Bailey | Executive Director, Theatre Development Fund |
| 2023 | Robert Fried | Accountant |
| 2024 | Wendall K. Harrington | Scenic projection designer |
| 2024 | Colleen Jennings-Roggensack | Executive director of ASU Gammage and longtime member of the Broadway League |
| 2024 | Judith O. Rubin | Outgoing board chair of Playwrights Horizons |
| 2024 | Dramatists Guild Foundation | |
| 2024 | Samuel J. Friedman Health Center for the Performing Arts | |
| 2025 | Michael P. Price | Longest serving artistic director of a professional theatre in the United States. |
| 2025 | Great Performances | |
| 2025 | New 42 | |
| 2025 | New York Public Library for the Performing Arts | |
| 2026 | 1/52 Project | Providing financial support for early-career designers. |
| 2026 | Jake Bell | Production manager |
| 2026 | Kenn Lubin | Print and marquee designer |
| 2026 | Loren Plotkin | Entertainment lawyer |

== See also ==
- Regional Theatre Tony Award
- Special Tony Award
- Isabelle Stevenson Award
