= Sophia Gennusa =

American actress (born 2003)

- Born: Sophia Elizabeth Gennusa; October 20, 2003 (age 22); Westchester County, New York, U.S.
- Occupation: Actress
- Years active: 2013–present

Sophia Elizabeth Gennusa (born October 20, 2003) is an American actress most known for playing the title role of Matilda Wormwood, in the original Broadway cast of Matilda the Musical, and Hannah Shepherd in The Enemy Within.

== Career ==
Gennusa is best known for debuting the role of Matilda Wormwood in the Broadway production of Matilda alongside Bailey Ryon, Oona Laurence, and Milly Shapiro at the Shubert Theatre. She returned to Broadway in 2015 for the new musical Doctor Zhivago at the Broadway Theatre. It closed after about three weeks, with an additional month of previews.

Gennusa frequently performs in benefit concerts and cabarets, and as of 2016 is the singer of the theme song for Sesame Street. She sang on an episode of Last Week Tonight with John Oliver in 2015.

In 2019, Gennusa began a recurring role on The Enemy Within as Hannah Shepherd.

== Personal life ==
Gennusa lives in Westchester County with her parents.

== Awards ==
She performed in Matilda as Matilda Wormwood until December 21, 2013. She later won a Tony Honor with Oona Laurence, Milly Shapiro, and Bailey Ryon for their outstanding Broadway debut in the show. She was also nominated for a Grammy Award for the cast album of Matilda.

== Filmography ==
=== Television ===
Year	Title	Role	Notes	Ref(s)
2013	The Princess Diary: Backstage at 'Cinderella' with Laura Osnes	Herself	1 episode	
2015	Last Week Tonight with John Oliver	Children's Chorus	1 episode	
2016	Limitless	Young Rebecca Harris	1 episode	
2019	The Enemy Within	Hannah Shepherd	Recurring role	

=== Theatre ===
Year	Title	Role	Theatre	Notes	Ref(s)
2013	Matilda The Musical	Matilda Wormwood	Sam S. Schubert Theatre	March 5 – December 21, 2013	
2015	Doctor Zhivago	Young Lara/Katarina	Broadway Theatre	March 27 – May 10, 2015	

=== Singles ===
Year	Title	Album	Ref(s)
2013	Naughty	Matilda The Musical	

=== Dance ===
Year	Title	Theatre	Notes	Ref(s)
2008	The Nutcracker	Purchase Conservatory College		
2009	The Nutcracker	Purchase Conservatory College		
2010	The Nutcracker	Purchase Conservatory College		
2011	The Nutcracker	Purchase Conservatory College		
2012	The Nutcracker	Purchase Conservatory College		
