= Peter Lawrence (stage manager) =

American stage manager and director

Peter Lawrence (born May 1, 1944) is an American stage manager, director, and production supervisor best known for his work on Broadway. Most recently, he stage managed Sea Wall/A Life directed by Carrie Cracknell, starring Jake Gyllenhaal.

== Early life ==
Peter Lawrence grew up in Ohio. He received his master's degree from the University of Hawaii. Along with his peers at the school, he founded the Manoa Valley Theatre in 1969. He worked as a theatre critic for local newspapers. He moved to New York City in 1972 to become a theatre critic.

== Career ==
Peter Lawrence began working as a stage manager shortly after meeting general manager Harvey Medlinsky while working as a box office worker for One Flew Over The Cuckoo's Nest. After meeting, Lawrence began stage manager for Medlinsky's dinner theaters.

He began his Broadway career in 1977 as the production stage manager of An Almost Perfect Person starring Colleen Dewhurst.

Lawrence has had long professional relationships with directors Mike Nichols, Sam Mendes, and producer Cameron Mackintosh. He began working with Nichols on Hurlyburly in 1984. Other works created together include Social Security, Death and the Maiden, and Spamalot.

He also worked extensively with Gene Saks on works including Lost in Yonkers, Rumors, Broadway Bound, and Jake's Women.

Other notable Broadway productions stage managed or supervised by Peter Lawrence include the revivals of Sunday in the Park with George, Sunset Boulevard, Ragtime, Gypsy, Man of La Mancha, Annie Get Your Gun, as well as Shrek The Musical, Miss Saigon, and The Graduate.

Lawrence wrote a book on stage management entitled Production Stage Management for Broadway. He teaches stage management at Columbia University.

== Honors ==
Lawrence was awarded the 2013 Tony Honor for Excellence in Theatre, only one of two stage managers to ever be awarded a Tony.
