= Bailey Ryon =

American actress (born 2002)

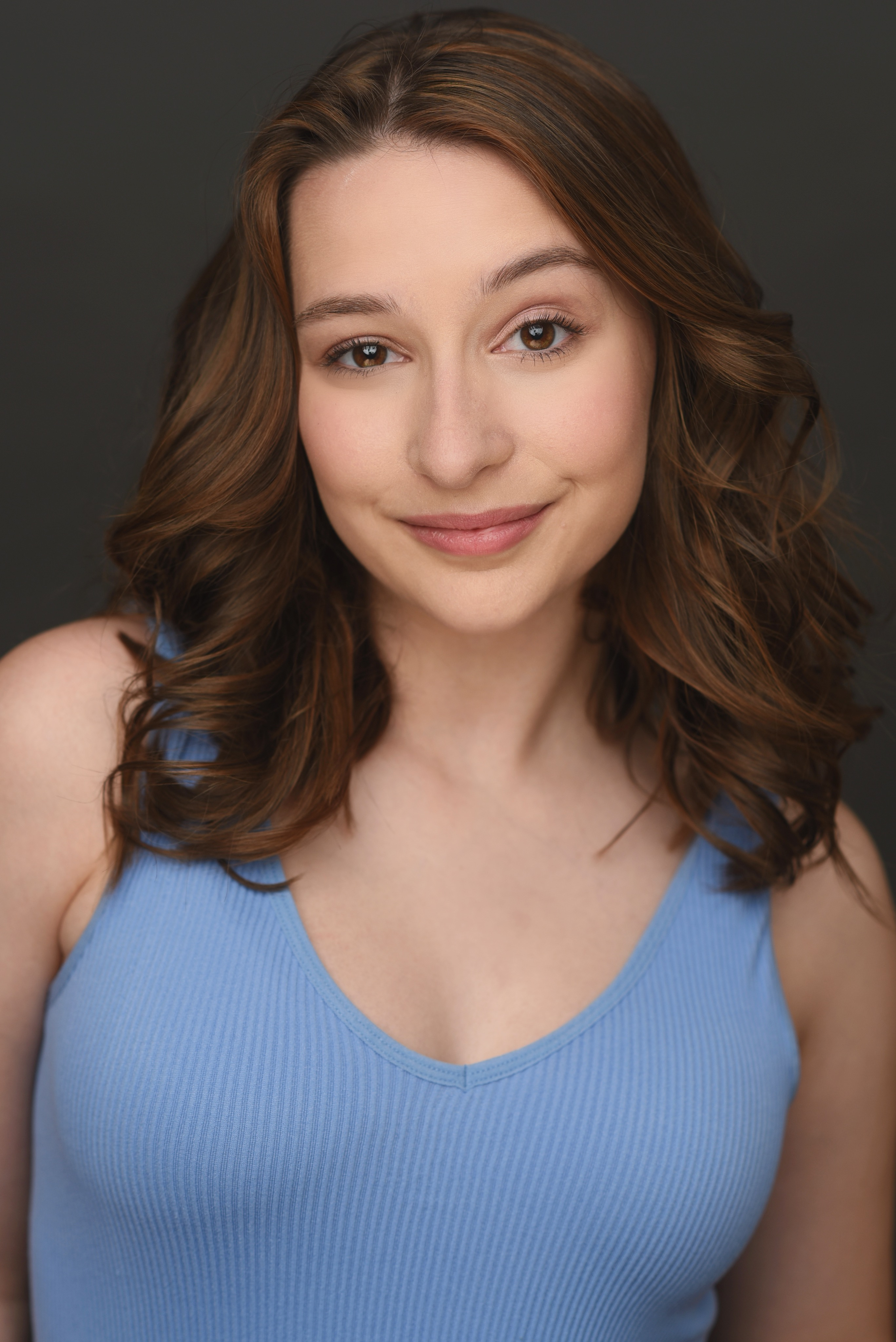
- Ryon in 2022
- Born: May 20, 2002 (age 24); Pennsylvania, U.S.
- Education: James Madison University (BFA)
- Occupations: Actress, singer
- Years active: 2013–present
- Website: bailey-ryon.com

Bailey Ryon (born May 20, 2002) is an American actress from Southern Pennsylvania, who was one of the original Broadway performers of Matilda in Matilda the Musical.

== Early life ==
Bailey graduated from Susquehannock High School in 2020 and went to study Musical Theatre at James Madison University.

== Career ==
She is known for originating the role of Matilda in Matilda the Musical on Broadway alongside fellow actresses Milly Shapiro, Oona Laurence, and Sophia Gennusa. She performed in Matilda from March 2013 to January 11, 2014. Her role in Matilda won her a Tony Honors for Excellence in the Theatre which she shared with her fellow Matildas. The original Broadway cast recording of Matilda the Musical was nominated for a Grammy Award for Best Musical Theater Album featuring her as a principal soloist along with Bertie Carvel, Sophia Gennusa, Oona Laurence, Milly Shapiro and Lauren Ward.

Before making her Broadway debut in Matilda the Musical, Bailey played Cindy Lou Who in the touring production of How the Grinch Stole Christmas.

== Credits ==
=== Theatre ===
Year	Title	Role	Notes
2011	How the Grinch Stole Christmas	Cindy Lou Who	National Tour
2011	Chitty Chitty Bang Bang	Ensemble	Fulton Theatre
2013, 2014	Matilda: The Musical	Matilda Wormwood	Broadway, Sam S. Schubert Theatre
2014	Sandman: A Little Nightmare Musical	Clara	New York Theater Festival
2016	The Secret Garden	Mary Lennox	Arden Theatre Co.
2017	The Matchmaker	Minnie Fae	Susquehannock Theatre
2018	Big Fish	Jenny Hill	Susquehannock Theatre
2019	The Wizard of Oz	Dorothy Gale	Susquehannock Theatre
2019	Puffs, or Seven Increasingly Eventful Years at a Certain School of Magic and Magic	Susie/Harry/Others	Susquehannock Theatre
2021	A Midsummer Night's Dream	Fairy Band	James Madison University
2022	RENT	Alexi Darling/Company	James Madison University
2023	Chicago	Liz/Roxie US	James Madison University
2023	Sunday In The Park With George	Dot/Marie	James Madison University
2024	SpongeBob: The Musical	Associate Choreographer/Ensemble/Foley US	James Madison University
2025	Kimberly Akimbo	Dance Captain	National Tour
2026	Beaches	Cee Cee Bloom (teen)	Broadway, Majestic Theatre

=== Dance ===
Year	Title	Role	Notes
2016	Coppélia	Corps	Susquehanna Youth Ballet
2017	Nutcracker	Clara	Susquehanna Youth Ballet
2018	A Midsummer Night's Dream	Helena	Susquehanna Youth Ballet
2019	Nutcracker	Corps	Susquehanna Youth Ballet

== Awards and nominations ==
Year	Award	Category	Work	Result	Ref.
2013	Tony Award	Excellence in Theatre	Matilda	Won	
2014	Grammy Award	Grammy Award for Best Musical Theater Album	Matilda	Nominated	
