= The Last Bimbo of the Apocalypse =

2024 off-Broadway musical

The Last Bimbo of the Apocalypse is a pop-rock musical by Pulitzer Prize finalists Michael Breslin and Patrick Foley. The show premiered as a staged reading at Pershing Square Signature Center as part of the 2024 FreeFest lineup, presented by The New Group. A limited Off-Broadway run was announced on February 11, 2025 at the Alice Griffin Jewel Box Theatre, starring Sara Gettelfinger, Keri René Fuller, and Luke Islam, and directed by Rory Pelsue.

Despite favorable reviews and being named a New York Times Critic’s Pick, the show did not extend beyond its initial run, closing on June 1, 2025, after 43 performances.

== Cast ==
Role	FreeFest (2024)	Signature Theatre (2025)
Brainworm	Milly Shapiro	Milly Shapiro
Coco	Keri René Fuller	Keri René Fuller
Earworm	Fernell Hogan	Luke Islam
Bookworm	Danny Bo	Patrick Nathan Falk
Kiki	Natalie Walker	Natalie Walker
Mother!	Katie Finneran	Sara Gettelfinger

== Songs ==
Song list:

1. Wormhole
2. Something Out of Nothing
3. Dig Deep
4. The Last Bimbo 1
5. I Literally Die
6. While No One's Looking
7. Stop Scrolling
8. The Last Bimbo 2
9. Crying in a Walmart
10. Damn
11. Shhh Don't Talk
12. Remember 2 Forget
13. It Girl
14. Hit Machine
15. Something Out of Nothing 2
16. The Last Bimbo 3
17. What If?

== Plot ==
An unnamed teen (Milly Shapiro) is doomscrolling ahead of her upcoming TikTok livestream. She is an internet microcelebrity, solving cold cases and advocating for missing persons' charities under the handle @She/HerSherlock. Despite her online celebrity, she streams with a filter covering her face, in an attempt to remain anonymous. Simultaneously, The Worms—Earworm and Bookworm—are streaming as well, describing the cultural significance of the infamous 2006 New York Post "3 bimbos of the apocalypse" article to a non-existent audience. ("Wormhole")

When @She/HerSherlock comes across The Worms' channel, she points out that the photograph accompanying the article, featuring Paris Hilton, Britney Spears, and Lindsey Lohan, also shows a fourth mystery girl, identifiable only by her wrist and a charm bracelet featuring the name "Coco". After sifting through archived Perez Hilton blog posts, the kids discover that Coco was a one hit wonder, uploading a single homemade music video to YouTube in 2006 ("Something Out of Nothing"). They also find a selfie, featuring Coco and two unknown women ("Dig Deep"), and an obituary uploaded to Hilton's blog that is noticeably vague, and does not list a cause of death. Determined to learn more, @She/HerSherlock, now dubbed Brainworm, agrees to remove her filter and join The Worms in creating a brand new online show dedicated to discovering what happened to Coco ("The Last Bimbo").

In their first livestream, The Worms focus on the selfie, attempting to discover the identities of the other women in the photo. They label the older woman "Mother" and the younger woman "Hoodie Girl", who they assume to be Coco's stylist. Earworm notices a knife in the photo near Hoodie Girl, and imagines a scenario in which Coco's stylist murdered her out of jealousy ("I Literally Die"). Brainworm ends the stream, and explains to Earworm that by creating conspiracy theories and reporting them as facts, he is sensationalizing Coco's death. Brainworm reveals that someone anonymously sent Coco's charm bracelet to her, and logs off, deciding to return to investigating on her own. Earworm and Bookworm also log off, and lament their complicated relationships with the internet, and one another ("While No Ones Looking").

The Worms start to receive threatening comments and direct messages from an anonymous user, instructing them to stop investigating Coco's disappearance. Brainworm returns to the group chat, and agrees to speak with the commenter, who is revealed to be Coco's Mother ("Stop Scrolling"). The group remounts their investigation ("The Last Bimbo 2"), returning again to the selfie. With Mother's words in mind, Brainworm imagines a scenario in which Coco grew up in a Conservative environment, and was murdered by her Mother in an attempt to "save her" from the "sin" of homosexuality ("Crying in a Walmart").

The Worms decide that the only way to find new clues is to find Hoodie Girl. They go through their comments, both positive and negative, to try and find her ("Damn"). Hoodie Girl reaches out to The Worms and reveals herself to be Coco's older sister, Kiki. She asks to speak to Brainworm alone, and admits to sending Brainworm Coco's bracelet in hopes that someone would rescue them ("Shh Don't Talk"). Via a livestreamed FaceTime call, Kiki reveals to the now ravenous viewers that Coco is still alive, and that she and Kiki have been locked in a bunker by their doomsday obsessed Mother for the last twenty years. Coco and her Mother perform a cultish ritual, in which they pray for deliverance from the supposed apocalypse that has occurred outside ("Remember 2 Forget").

Kiki introduces Coco to Brainworm, who explains that she and the audience have been trying to find her. Coco is thrilled to hear that millions of people are listening in on their conversation via the livestream, and reverts to her pre-bunker self, dressing like a Y2K popstar and confronting her Mother about her lies ("It"). Mother assures Coco that she only kept her here to keep her safe from the dark side of the entertainment industry, and offers her and Kiki the keys to the bunker. Kiki is ready to leave, but Coco is nervous. Brainworm reveals to Coco that she has voluntarily locked herself in her room for the last four years, as she is terrified of the outside world. Coco agrees to leave the bunker under the condition that Brainworm also leaves her room ("Hit Machine"). Left alone online, Brainworm makes a startling discover.

A week later, Coco, Kiki, and their Mother are backstage at a television studio, preparing for the first live taping of the newly remounted Total Request Live, which Coco is set to host. Brainworm arrives to meet them, and confronts Coco about her use of "YOLO" during their FaceTime conversation, as the phrase was not popularized until 2010, four years after Coco and Kiki were supposedly locked in the bunker. It is revealed that Coco faked her own death after seeing a Myspace post claiming that great artists are only appreciated after they've died. Brainworm threatens to expose Coco, and leaves the dressing room ("Something Out of Nothing 2").

Earworm and Bookworm meet in person for the first time during the live taping, and officially announce their relationship to the world ("The Last Bimbo 3"). Coco and her Mother pretend to make up on camera, and Kiki announces that the family have several merchandise lines in the works to build Coco's brand. Brainworm is brought on stage, and decides not to expose Coco, instead announcing that all of the proceeds from the aforementioned merchandise will go towards advocating for missing girls around the country. Coco has no choice but to accept, and her entire scheme comes crashing down ("What If?").

== Critical reception ==
The Last Bimbo of the Apocalypse received a range of reviews from critics, and was named a New York Times Critics’ Pick, with several reviewers complimenting the show's casting and use of early 2000s nostalgia.

The musical received a nomination for Outstanding Off-Broadway Musical at the 2026 Dorian Awards. Natalie Walker also received a nomination for Outstanding Featured Performer in a Musical at the 2026 Lucille Lortel Awards for her performance as Kiki.
