= Shirley Herz =

Shirley Herz (December 30, 1925 – August 11, 2013) was an American Broadway theatre publicist.

Herz publicized Broadway, Off-Broadway and Off-Off Broadway productions, ballet companies, circuses, worlds fairs, films and television programs, beginning in 1954, aged 28, when she was the press assistant for the Truman Capote and Harold Arlen musical, House of Flowers. She worked with many notables, including Tallulah Bankhead, Rosalind Russell, Eva Le Gallienne, Jerry Herman, and Julie Harris, as well as with many off-Broadway (such as Manhattan Theatre Club) and off-off-Broadway companies.

The Broadway League and the American Theatre Wing presented Herz with a special Tony Award for Excellence in Theatre at the 63rd Tony Awards ceremony on June 7, 2009.

== Death ==
Herz suffered a stroke on July 18, 2013 and died on August 11, aged 87. Her sole immediate survivor is Herbert Boley, her husband from 1948 until her death.

== Productions ==
Broadway productions for which she acted as press agent or representative include:

Who's Afraid of Virginia Woolf?, 2005
The Goat, or Who is Sylvia? 2002
Angela Lansbury - A Celebration, 1996
Translations, 1995
The Rise and Fall of Little Voice, 1994
A Little More Magic, 1994
Wonderful Tennessee, 1993
Mixed Emotions, 1993
Someone Who'll Watch Over Me, 1992-1993
Crazy He Calls Me, 1992
Catskills on Broadway, 1991-93
Park Your Car in Harvard Yard, 1991-92
Peter Pan, 1990–91; 1991-92
Shogun, The Musical, 1990-91
Fiddler on the Roof [Revival], 1990-91
A Change in the Heir, 1990
Cat on a Hot Tin Roof [Revival] 1990
Gypsy [Revival], 1989-91
Prince of Central Park, 1989
The Threepenny Opera [Revival], 1989
Dangerous Games, 1989
Starmites, 1989
Chu Chem, 1989
Cafe Crown [Revival], 1989
Legs Diamond 1988-89
Paul Robeson [Revival] 1988
Burn This, 1988
All My Sons, 1987
Raggedy Ann, 1986

Jerry's Girls, 1986
Singin' in the Rain, 1985-86
Home Front, 1985
Quilters, 1984
Open Admissions, 1984
Marilyn, 1983
La Cage aux Folles, 1983-87
The Ritz [Revival] 1983
Ned & Jack, 1981
Wally's Cafe, 1981
The Five O'Clock Girl [Revival], 1981
To Grandmother's House We Go, 1981
Onward Victoria, 1980
Perfectly Frank, 1980
Happy New Year, 1980
Canterbury Tales [Revival], 1980
The Lady from Dubuque, 1980
King of Schnorrers, 1979-80
Strider, 1979-80
The Madwoman of Central Park West, 1979
My Old Friends, 1979
Platinum, 1978
The November People, 1978
An Almost Perfect Person, 1977-78
The Night of the Tribades, 1977
The Royal Family (play) [Revival], 1976

Summer Brave, 1975
Ride the Winds, 1974
Holiday [Revival], 1973-74
Chemin de Fer [Revival], 1973-74
The Visit [Revival], 1973-74
The Women [Revival], 1973
Look Away, 1973
Ring Around the Bathtub, 1972
Hedda Gabler [Revival], 1971
A Doll's House [Revival], 1971
The Rothschilds, 1970-72
Oh! Calcutta!, 1969-72
Forty Carats, 1968-70
The Family Way, 1965
Zizi, 1964-65
Conversation at Midnight, 1964
A Girl Could Get Lucky, 1964
Marathon '33, 1963-64
Romulus, 1962
Everybody Loves Opal, 1961
Mary, Mary, 1961-64
Happy Town, 1959
The Cold Wind and the Warm, 1958-59
Miss Isobel, 1957-58
Rumple, 1957
Compulsion, 1957-58
The Cave Dwellers, 1957-58
Romanoff and Juliet, 1957-58
House of Flowers, 1954–55.
