= Summer Camp Island =

Animated television series

- Genre: Comedy; Adventure; Fantasy; Slice of life
- Created by: Julia Pott
- Voices of: Elliott Smith; Asher Bishop; Antonio Raul Corbo; Oona Laurence; Julia Pott; Lo Mutuc (Note: Credited as Charlyne Yi); Nikki Castillo; Ramone Hamilton
- Theme music composer: Seo Kim; John Enroth; Albert Fox; Mark Mothersbaugh
- Opening theme: "Summer Camp Island" performed by Oona Laurence, Seo Kim (sometimes), Lesley Nicol (season 3, episodes 1–4), Sam Lavagnino (season 3, episodes 5–7), and Scott Hoying (season 4, "Sea Bunnies" only)
- Composers: John Enroth; Albert Fox; Mark Mothersbaugh
- Country of origin: United States
- Original language: English
- No. of seasons: 6
- No. of episodes: 120 (list of episodes)

Production
- Executive producers: Julia Pott; Kent Osborne; Curtis Lelash (season 1); Jennifer Pelphrey (seasons 1–4); Tramm Wigzell (seasons 1–4); Rob Sorcher (seasons 1–4); Brian A. Miller (seasons 1–4); Sam Register (seasons 5–6)
- Producer: Rossitza Likomanova
- Running time: 11–12 minutes
- Production company: Cartoon Network Studios

Original release
- Network: Cartoon Network (seasons 1 and 6); HBO Max (seasons 2–5)
- Release: July 7, 2018 – August 11, 2023

Summer Camp Island is an American animated television series created by Julia Pott for Cartoon Network. Produced by Cartoon Network Studios, it premiered on July 7, 2018. The series depicts the episodic adventures of Oscar and Hedgehog, both of whom are attending the magical eponymous summer camp, supervised by a witch named Susie. The show premiered with a 48-hour marathon consisting of the first 20 episodes running over an entire weekend, on both Cartoon Network and Boomerang. Another 20 episodes premiered on June 23, 2019, as the second half of the first season.

Four additional seasons premiered exclusively on HBO Max, at roughly six-month intervals from June 2020 to December 2021. The series was removed from HBO Max in the United States in mid-2022 amongst a number of other cartoons, after which its sixth and final season premiered on Cartoon Network in mid-2023. It was later made available to stream for free on Sling TV.

== Premise ==
Set in a world populated by anthropomorphic animals, Summer Camp Island follows two childhood best friends Oscar Peltzer, an elephant, and Hedgehog, a hedgehog, who are dropped off at a magical summer camp. The camp is a host to many bizarre occurrences, such as camp counselors who are popular girl witches, horses that transform into unicorns, talking sharks, yetis, haunted cabins, post-it notes that lead to other dimensions, and nosey monsters that live under the bed. Oscar and Hedgehog must contend with these out-of-place events and make their stay at camp worthwhile.

== Episodes ==
Season	Episodes		Originally released		
Season	Episodes		First released	Last released	Network
1	40	20	July 7, 2018		Cartoon Network
1	40	20	June 23, 2019	July 21, 2019	Cartoon Network
2	20		June 18, 2020		HBO Max
3	12		December 10, 2020	December 24, 2020	HBO Max
4	13		June 17, 2021		HBO Max
5	15		December 9, 2021		HBO Max
6	20		July 31, 2023	August 11, 2023	Cartoon Network

== Characters ==
=== Main ===
- Oscar Peltzer (voiced by Justin Felbinger in the pilot and Elliott Smith in "The First Day"–"The Library", Asher Bishop in "Spell Crushers"–"Glow Worm", and Antonio Raul Corbo in Seasons 3–6) is an 11-year-old anthropomorphic elephant who is best friends with Hedgehog. Oscar tends to be socially awkward and slightly uncomfortable with his new surroundings. When he sets his mind to something, he will become determined to perform any task or complete any objective. He has a strong connection to Hedgehog to the point that if she disappeared or something happened to her, he becomes inconsolable, though he does learn to work without her. He believes in order and will do anything to outsmart or outdo Susie, the camp counselor. He lives in New Jersey. In the episode "Glow Worm", he is revealed to be a magical glow worm who is able to make positive and happy events occur when he does something nice, dedicated, considerate and happy and gives magic to other beings.
- Hedgehog (voiced by Ashley Boettcher in the pilot and Oona Laurence in the series) is an 11-year-old anthropomorphic hedgehog who is best friends with Oscar. She is the more level-headed and logical of the two. She mostly wants to help Oscar out of his comfort zone, but also wants to outdo Susie. In the episode "Hedgehog Werewolf", Hedgehog is bitten by the Werewolf Queen, giving her the ability to transform into a werewolf at the full moon every month. Hedgehog comes to accept her condition and does wolf activities with Betsy and the other werewolves of the island. She used to have crush on Max but she was heartbroken when she found out he wasn't interested in her. Luckily, her friends helped her get over it. She lives in New Jersey. Hedgehog enjoys playing music, radio show hosting, science and spells throughout episodes.
- Susie McCallister (voiced by Julia Pott; Poppy DeAbaitua (young); Joanna Lumley (adult)) is an anthropomorphic cat, a witch and lead camp counselor. She can be mean and condescending to the campers at times. Deep down, she does display some responsible and sympathetic behavior, but would rather be rude to the campers. Despite looking and acting as a 15-year-old, she is around 400 years old, having gained immortality from a magic potion. She loves to tease and torment Oscar and Hedgehog whenever she gets the chance to do it, especially Oscar. Later in the series, Susie becomes Hedgehog's new magic teacher at Ramona's insistence. In the fifth season, it is revealed that her parents went missing in the North Pole when they were planned to be escorted to London with the potion to help her sister Mildred control her growing uncontrollable magic power.
- Alice Fefferman (voiced by Lo Mutuc) is an anthropomorphic woolly mammoth, a witch and one of the camp's counselors and the most powerful of the three. She serves as Susie's right-hand woman but generally is not as mean to the campers as Susie is. She is very commanding, however, and would rather turn everything around her cute just to please her.
- Betsy Spellman (voiced by Nikki Castillo) is an anthropomorphic horse, a witch and one of the camp's counselors. She appears to be the kindest and most down-to-earth of the witches and seems to clash with Susie at times. It is revealed in "Hedgehog Werewolf" that she herself is a werewolf, something she keeps secret from everyone except Hedgehog. She also teaches Hedgehog the ways of magic in secret especially from Susie. In Season 3, it is revealed that she is the youngest witch on the island.
- Max (voiced by Thomas Vaethroeder in the pilot and Ramone Hamilton in the series) is an anthropomorphic part bat and part vampire. He is a fun-loving, wily, and also helpful kid who likes to enjoy the company of Oscar and Hedgehog. However, in the pilot he shows a more aggressive attitude towards Oscar, seeing him as somewhat of a nuisance. Everyone appears to think he is cool because of his backwards cap.

=== Supporting ===
- Pajamas (voiced by Anna Strupinsky in the pilot and Naomi Hansen in the series) is a pair of sentient pajamas owned by Oscar. Believed to be gender-fluid (referred to as "she" and "he" throughout the series.)
- Pepper Corn (voiced by Sam Lavagnino in seasons 1–3 and Julian Edwards in season 4 onward) is an anthropomorphic part panda and part cloud person normally seen with his security blanket. He has an innocent yet somewhat neurotic personality at times.
- Lucy Thompson (voiced by Indie Nameth) is a 9-year-old anthropomorphic part aardvark and part yeti. She lives in Manhattan and is very independent. She is unaware of the fact that her mother's letters are actually from Susie. She has a crush on Oscar. She can understand yeti language. Her yeti name is Bagpipes.
- Oliver (voiced by Andre Robinson) is an anthropomorphic part dog and part monster who is musically gifted.
- Alexa (voiced by Alexa Nisenson) and Lem Mongello (voiced by Daphne Thomas in season 1, Mattea Quin in seasons 2-4 and Mykal-Michelle Harris in seasons 5-present) are two anthropomorphic giraffes who are sisters.
  - Alexa is part giant who is athletic and active. Multiple times throughout the series, she is seen watching over and protecting Lem like a parental figure.
  - Lem, who is the youngest camper. She is shown to have a very strong relationship with her older sister Alexa, even sharing the same cabin as her sibling. She attended the camp with a fake invitation, and is therefore the only member of the camp without a magical identity.
- Dr. P. Shark (voiced by Judd Hirsch in the pilot and Richard Kind in the series) is an anthropomorphic talking shark who lives in the pool by Oscar's cabin. He is revealed to be a therapist.
- Barb Goldberg (voiced by Whoopi Goldberg) is a hard working elf and friend to Oscar and Hedgehog. In the fifth season, it is revealed Barb has been around since the dawn of time.
- Howard (voiced by Mike Birbiglia) is a grey monster with glasses who inhabits the island. He is friends with Oscar and the other campers.
- Ava (voiced by Fortune Feimster) is a black-spotted dalmatian-like monster who inhabits the island. In "Ava's Yard Sale", it is revealed that she is Blanche's girlfriend.
- Mortimer (voiced by Bobby Moynihan) is a blueish grey rabbit-like monster who inhabits the island. In Season 1, he is revealed to be former student from Harvard University.
- Blanche (voiced by Alia Shawkat) is a brown horned monster who inhabits the island. In "Ava's Yard Sale", it is revealed that she is Ava's girlfriend.
- Melvin (voiced by Bobby Moynihan) is a small orange monster who inhabits the island.
- Margot (voiced by Kimiko Glenn) is a purple winged monster who inhabits the island.
- Godmonster (voiced by Brenda Vaccaro) is an elderly purple monster who inhabits the island.
- Freddie (voiced by Cole Sanchez) is an infant blue monster who lives in Heartforde.
- Paulette (voiced by Paula Poundstone) is a brown monster who works at Heartforde Herald.
- The Sun (voiced by Melanie Lynskey) is a New Zealand-accented sun who is indifferent to those around her.
- The Moon (voiced by Cedric the Entertainer in Seasons 1-5 and Stefan Johnson in Season 6 onwards) is the friendly moon who is friends with Oscar and Hedgehog.
- Monster Under the Bed (voiced by Judd Hirsch in the pilot and Alfred Molina in the series) is a monster who resides under Hedgehog's bed.
- Sue Peltzer (voiced by Kathleen Wilhoite) is an anthropomorphic elephant and Oscar's mother.
- Andy Peltzer (voiced by Alfred Molina) is an anthropomorphic elephant and Oscar's father.
- Saxophone (voiced by Elijah Wood) is an adolescent yeti.
- Puddle (voiced by Ethan Maher) is a non-binary alien who is in love with the king of their planet. They later become a couple. Later, Puddle and the King get married in "We'll Just Move the Stars".
- The King (voiced by Sam Lavagnino in Seasons 1-5 and Dylan Alvarado in Season 6 onwards) is Puddle's boyfriend who later becomes their husband.
- Ghost the Boy (voiced by Caleb McLaughlin (present); Xavier Patterson (Betsy and Ghost)) is a ghost and Betsy's ex-boyfriend. His parents Kent and Cole are a male same-sex couple.
- Kent (voiced by Kent Osborne) and Cole (voiced by Cole Sanchez) are Ghost's dads.
- Cinnamon Raisin Toast (voiced by Alia Shawkat) is a piece of cinnamon raisin toast who studies journalism.
- Popular Banana Split (voiced by Nat Faxon) is a jock banana split.
- Jimjams (voiced by Bobby Moynihan) is Ramona's old pajamas who lives as Susie's roommate.
- Oddjobs (voiced by Aparna Nancherla) is an anthropomorphic squirrel who works as a postwoman, later morale officer of UMPS.
- Ramona (voiced by Lesley Nicol; Isobel Chinnery (age 8); Bella Ramsey (age 15)) is an anthropomorphic sheep who is Susie's elderly friend that lives in between time. In series finale, she finally escapes the frozen time and reunites with Susie.
- The Werewolf Queen (voiced by Lorraine Bracco) is a tiny gray wolf cub who is in reality the leader of the island's werewolf population. After Hedgehog saved her, she bit Hedgehog as a way to say thanks.
- Stuart Stewartson (voiced by Stephen Root) is a hairy dragon and former bartender from New York City.
- Butter Goth (voiced by Alia Shawkat) is a gothic butter.
- Boy Band (voiced by Ethan Maher) is a very popular music group of the island.
- Georgina (voiced by Kate Flannery) is an anthropomorphic beaver and artist.
- Dungeon Doug (voiced by Justin Felbinger) is an anthropomorphic dog and the swordsman who is the main protagonist from the book of same name.
- Skadi (voiced by Betsy Sodaro) is a giant and cloud puncher.
- Mallory (voiced by Jo Firestone) is an anthropomorphic alligator and a witch.
- Agatha is an anthropomorphic raccoon and a witch.
- Opie (voiced by Aparna Nancherla) is an anthropomorphic dog and a witch.
- Emma (voiced by Lesley Nicol) is an anthropomorphic frog and a witch.
- Shortcake (voiced by Niki Yang) is an alien who is miner of Strawberry Mine of Alien Planet.
- Mrs. Clarinet (voiced by Frances Conroy), yeti musical teacher.
- Yums (vocal effects by Naomi Hansen) is a baby yetis.
- Fife (voiced by Jason Maybaum) is a young yeti.
- Xylophone (voiced by Kevin Michael Richardson) is one of the yeti elders.
- Bassoon (voiced by Doug Benson) is one of the yeti elders.
- Lithophone (voiced by Keith David) is the largest and oldest yeti of the island.
- Morris Mole (voiced by Wallace Shawn) is an anthropomorphic mole who works as Molar Moles inspector.
- Bartholomole (voiced by John Hodgman) is an anthropomorphic mole who works as Molar Moles lawyer.
- Jabberwock (vocal effects by Frank Welker (uncredited)) are the giant creatures those can only be seen between the seconds of the time. In series finale, Jabberwocks become friendly.
- Moon Dog is an extraterrestrial dog on which Puddle and the King ride.
- Mildred McCallister (voiced by Faye Larkin; Georgie Glen (adult)) is an anthropomorphic cat and Susie's long-lost younger sister who was born with overactive magical glands which made her the most powerful witch in the world. She also gained immortality like her sister by drinking the remaining immortality potion. Feeling she has caused too much trouble in England and unable to find her sister to apologize for her actions, she went to the North Pole to find their parents unaware Susie took a ship heading towards the United States of America. In Season 6, she arrives at Summer Camp Island and meets Hedgehog for first time and reunites with Susie.
- Snowflake (voiced by Lolly Adefope) is a rogue snowflake that befriends Cookiesmell and later died offscreen in the middle of the episode "Shave A Little Off the Wheel".
- Cutie (voiced by Travis McElroy) is an anthropomorphic rabbit that Oscar mistaken him as the demon in the tree.
- Cookiesmell (voiced by Danny Pudi) is an anthropomorphic mouse who befriends snowflake.
- Time Babies (vocal effects by Ethan Maher) are a humanoids which create only in the frozen time.
- Patootie (voiced by Max Mitchell) is one of alien jesters.
- Noodle (voiced by Remy Edgerly) is one of alien jesters.
- Glazed Ham (voiced by Lucian Perez) is one of alien jesters.
- Bonbon is one of alien jesters.
- Cream Puff is one of alien jesters.
- Blob Fish (voiced by Scott Hoying)
- Ghost the Earnest (voiced by Fred Stoller)
- Gerald (voiced by Bob Balaban)
- Red-Haired Moom (voiced by Audrey Wasilewski) is one of Hedgehog's ancestors.
- The Broom Maker (voiced by Richard Masur) is an anthropomorphic owl and the kind broom maker who makes the broom for Hedgehog.
- Poppawoppa McCallister (voiced by Julian Barratt) is an anthropomorphic cat and wizard who is Susie's and Mildred's father.
- Mrs. McCallister (voiced by Shirley Henderson) is an anthropomorphic cat and witch who is Susie's and Mildred's mother.
- Striped Horse (voiced by Kate Berlant) is a villainous Zebra.
- Bearded Sheep (voiced by John Early) is a villainous Sheep.
- Professor Q (voiced by Chris Fleming) is a monster teacher of Harvard University.
- Pale Dog (voiced by Ian Chen) is a villainous Dog.
- Miracle Rabbit (voiced by Sacha Dhawan) is an immortal Hare who lives on the moon.
- Time (voiced by Kevin Michael Richardson) is a serpent-like being who controls all time in the universe.

== Production ==
The series is the second Cartoon Network original series to be solely created by a woman, the first being Steven Universe, which was created by Rebecca Sugar.

The series was first announced in January 2017 and later had been shopped around at different festivals, including Sundance.

=== Development ===
During a presentation at MipJunior in Cannes in October 2018, creator Julia Pott stated that the series was intended for viewers craving gentleness and compared its soothing tone to the television series Gilmore Girls. Pott compared her animated series, which follows two friends at a magical sleepaway camp, to Gilmore Girls. "Nothing bad is ever going to happen in that show, and if you really just need to be soothed, you can watch it, and that is what we want with this show… anyone that wants to feel soothed, it is for them," she added. "There is darker stuff in there, but it is in a little cute package."

At the MIPJunior session, Rob Sorcher, then Chief Content Officer at Cartoon Network, presented the European premiere of the series, noting the depth of its world-building and creative direction. The series was developed through Cartoon Network's Artists Program, which "specializes in curating distinct and diverse artists, most of whom have never run a show", Sorcher said. While many participants have never worked in television at all, the program has "become the main pipeline of television development" for the network, spawning 11 series to date.

Creator Julia Pott drew inspiration for Summer Camp Island from her childhood interests in "spooky" folklore and supernatural television series like Buffy the Vampire Slayer and Sabrina the Teenage Witch. Pott designed the show's world to reflect a "kid-logic perspective," where fantastical elements such as monsters under the bed, ghosts, and quicksand are accepted as reality.

After working as a freelancer on short films such as Belly and The Event, Pott joined the crew of the Cartoon Network series Adventure Time. This period served as a transition to her role as creator and showrunner of Summer Camp Island, a production valued at approximately $30 million according to executive Rob Sorcher. Pott has described the transition from independent filmmaking to managing a large team as "overwhelming," noting that the increased responsibility led to personal struggles with anxiety and panic attacks. Reflecting on the production process, she stated that the "hardest thing to deal with was her own expectations," noting that the scale of the project often led to intense self-criticism over perceived failures.

During her time on Adventure Time, Niki Yang received creative guidance from showrunners Adam Muto and Pendleton Ward regarding the pressures of television production. Muto advised her that "not every episode is your episode," encouraging her to let go of segments that were not working. Similarly, Ward suggested focusing on a single successful element within an episode rather than striving for perfection, noting that "if there is one thing in the episode that you think is funny, that is a victory."

Despite advice from executive producer Rob Sorcher to use adult voice actors, Pott insisted on casting real children to achieve a sense of sincerity and authenticity inspired by Peanuts. The character Pajamas was voiced by three-year-old Naomie. Pott described her as one of the show's best performers, noting that the child occasionally rewrote lines that did not make sense to her.

== Broadcast ==
The series premiered on Cartoon Network on July 7, 2018. The show's premiere marathon also happened on Cartoon Network's sister channel Boomerang on July 7, 2018. The marathon ended on July 9, 2018, at 6:00 AM. The show's premiere marathon also occurred on Teletoon on August 13, 2018. On Cartoon Network Latin America/Brazil, it premiered in August 18, 2018. On Cartoon Network Australia and New Zealand, a sneak peek of the series was broadcast on December 15, 2018. It premiered on Cartoon Network Southeast Asia/Philippines on January 25, 2019. The show premiered on Cartoon Network UK on March 4, 2019. The show also premiered on Cartoon Network India around July 19, 2019.

At San Diego Comic-Con 2018, Julia Pott announced that the second half of the first season would premiere in late 2018 on Cartoon Network with another 20 episodes. Those episodes ended up being pushed to 2019, and on May 20, 2019, it was announced that the episodes would premiere on June 23, 2019.

At San Diego Comic-Con 2019, Pott announced that the series had been renewed for a second season, which premiered exclusively on HBO Max on June 18, 2020. The third season premiered on December 10, 2020. The fourth season premiered on June 17, 2021. The fifth season was released on December 9, 2021. The sixth and final season was scheduled for June 9, 2022, but after HBO Max removed a number of cartoons in the United States that August (when it aired early on Cartoon Network Italy), it instead premiered on Cartoon Network in mid-2023. By mid-2025, the series was available to stream for free on Sling TV.

== Home media ==
Summer Camp Island home video releases
Seasons	Year	Episodes	Release dates
Seasons	Year	Episodes	Australia
1–3	2021	72	Seasons 1–3 DVD: October 6, 2021; Episodes: "The First Day" – "Yeti Confetti Chapter Five: Where's the Confetti"

== Reception ==
=== Critical response ===
Reception to the series has been positive. Journalist Abbey White of The Hollywood Reporter and Insider argued that it follows in the footsteps of Steven Universe, and praised the storyline about two non-binary aliens who love each other, with a "sweet, beautiful song," and saying that it is in an "age-appropriate way ... [which can] reach kids [so] that they can understand."

Emily Ashby of Common Sense Media described the series as quirky and heartwarming, arguing that it has "cross-generational appeal", stating that there are many "quirky characters and silly adventures", many of which are relatable in their daily experiences. She also said the series has a "a welcome freshness that...yields a worthy contender for families' attention."

=== Accolades ===
Year	Award	Category	Nominee(s)	Result
2016	AFI Fest	Animated Short Special Jury Mention	Julia Pott (for "Pilot")	Won
2016	AFI Fest	Animated Short Film	Julia Pott (for "Pilot")	Nominated
2017	Florida Film Festival	Best Short Film	Julia Pott (for "Pilot")	Won
2017	Provincetown International Film Festival	Best Animated Short	Julia Pott (for "Pilot")	Won
2017	San Francisco International Film Festival	Best Family Film	Julia Pott (for "Pilot")	Won
2017	San Francisco International Film Festival	Best Animated Short	Julia Pott (for "Pilot")	Nominated
2017	Sundance Film Festival	N/A	Julia Pott (for "Pilot")	Nominated
2017	SXSW Film Festival	Animated Short	Julia Pott (for "Pilot")	Nominated
2018	Common Sense Media	Common Sense Seal	Summer Camp Island	Won
2021	GLAAD Media Awards	Outstanding Children's Programming	Summer Camp Island	Nominated
2021	Daytime Emmy Awards	Outstanding Voice Directing for a Daytime Animated Series	Kristi Reed	Nominated
2022	GLAAD Media Awards	Outstanding Children's Programming	Summer Camp Island	Nominated
2022	Children's and Family Emmy Awards	Outstanding Voice Directing for an Animated Series	Kristi Reed	Nominated
2024	Peabody Awards	Children's/Youth	Summer Camp Island	Nominated
2024	Children's and Family Emmy Awards	Outstanding Children's or Young Teen Animated Series	Julia Pott, Sam Register (executive producers); Rossitza Likomanova, Cole Sanchez (supervising producers)	Nominated
