= Milly Shapiro =

American actress and singer

- Shapiro at Tribeca Film Festival in 2026
- Occupations: Actress; singer
- Years active: 2013–present
- Notable work: Matilda the Musical, Hereditary

Milly Shapiro is an American actress and singer. She won an honorary Tony Award in 2013 for her role as Matilda Wormwood in the Broadway production of Matilda the Musical. She is best known for her roles as Matilda Wormwood in Matilda the Musical and Charlie Graham in 2018 horror film Hereditary.

== Career ==
Shapiro began acting at the age of five. At the age of ten, she made her debut as the titular Matilda in Matilda the Musical, which opened on Broadway's Shubert Theatre on 11 April 2013. She originated the role on Broadway, along with Sophia Gennusa, Bailey Ryon, and Oona Laurence. Shapiro won a Tony Honor alongside the three other actresses for her work in Matilda, making her the youngest recipient of the award in history. In addition, she was nominated for the Grammy for "Best Musical Theater Album" for the musical's cast album.

In 2018, fourteen-year-old Shapiro made her film debut as Charlie Graham in Ari Aster's 2018 horror film Hereditary.

Shapiro and Spencer Arjang co-created the band AFTERxCLASS in 2021, before disbanding it on 14 October 2022.

== Personal life ==
Shapiro attended Professional Children's School in New York City. Shapiro and her sister Abi Monterey perform together as the Shapiro Sisters. Along with her sister and mother, Shapiro was born with cleidocranial dysostosis.

She came out as a lesbian in June 2021.

== Discography ==
| Year | Title | Notes | Type |
|---|---|---|---|
| 2014 | Live Out Loud – Live at 54 Below | with Abigail Shapiro | Live album from 54 Below concert. |
| 2021 | Honey | With Spencer Arjang, as part of band AFTERxCLASS | Single |
| 2021 | nice to be with you | With Spencer Arjang, as part of band AFTERxCLASS | Single |
| 2022 | Following Laika | With Spencer Arjang, as part of band AFTERxCLASS | Single |
| 2022 | Sunshower Daydreams | With Spencer Arjang, as part of band AFTERxCLASS | Single |

== Filmography ==
=== Theatre ===
| Year | Title | Role | Theatre | Notes |
|---|---|---|---|---|
| 2013–14 | Matilda the Musical | Matilda Wormwood | Sam S. Shubert Theatre | 8 March 2013 – 19 January 2014 |
| 2016 | You're a Good Man, Charlie Brown | Sally Brown | York Theatre | 2016 |
| 2025 | The Last Bimbo of the Apocalypse | Brainworm | Alice Griffin Jewel Box Theatre | 2025 |

=== Film ===
| Year | Title | Role |
|---|---|---|
| 2018 | Hereditary | Charlotte "Charlie" Graham |
| 2022 | The Curse of Bridge Hollow | Ramona |
| 2026 | Hallowarrior | Pumpkin |

=== Television ===
| Year | Title | Role | Notes |
|---|---|---|---|
| 2018 | Splitting Up Together | Emma Rebecca | Episode: "We Need to Talk About Karen" |
| 2019 | The Boulet Brothers' Dragula | Herself (Guest Judge) | Season 3, Episode 6 |
| 2020 | JJ Villard's Fairy Tales | Princess Jezebel, Goldilox (voice) | Season 1, Episodes 1, 2 |
| 2024 | Hysteria! | Ingrid | |

== Sources ==
- Torch solo, then jammy time, New York Times
- Debut of the Month: Four Young Stars of Matilda: The Musical, Broadway World
