= Hallowarrior =

- Film poster
- Directed by: Ben Sottak
- Written by: Ben Sottak
- Produced by: Emmajane Hoffman; Gabriel Rosenstein; Ben Sottak; Jake Casey; Danielle Benedict
- Starring: Milly Shapiro; Shannyn Sossamon
- Cinematography: Steven Jacob Russell
- Edited by: Andi Ralph
- Production companies: The Dazey Phase Production Company; The Spitting Image
- Distributed by: Shudder
- Release dates: June 10, 2026 (Tribeca Festival); October 16, 2026 (United States)
- Running time: 80 minutes
- Country: United States
- Language: English

Hallowarrior is a 2026 American post-apocalyptic horror film written, directed, and produced by Ben Sottak. It stars Milly Shapiro, Ajani Russell, A. J. Bowen, and Shannyn Sossamon.

Hallowarrior had its world premiere at the Tribeca Festival on June 10, 2026, and it was released in the United States on October 16, 2026.

== Plot ==
Following an unexplained apocalyptic event, young Pumpkin lives by herself in her old farmhouse. For the past four years, she has been celebrating Halloween, leaving candy outside, and sending radio messages out in the hopes of someone answering her. Suffering from loneliness, she intends to shoot herself, but gets a brief radio transmission, only to lose it when she accidentally drops the batteries.

After awakening from a nightmare, Pumpkin sees someone actually taking candy from her bowl and chases them, only to lose them. Well into the night, Pumpkin is surprised by the appearance of people in her house. The woman, Thalia, introduces herself, her husband Royce, and a fellow traveler, Wendy, whom Pumpkin saw earlier. While put off by Pumpkin's talkative nature and her current obsession with Halloween, they entertain her and feed her desire for companionship. Thalia leaves to go get the rest of their group, while Royce and Wendy stay to watch Pumpkin. Despite Wendy's rather anti-social personality, she finds common ground with Pumpkin and admits that her favorite Halloween pastime was the hayride with her sister.

Royce soon reveals his aggressive side and takes Pumpkin's gun after seeing that she uses the decomposed bodies of her parents to fill the void of her loneliness. Wendy stabs Royce in the back of the neck and knocks him out. Pumpkin is upset over the carnage, but Wendy reveals that Royce, Thalia and the others are all cannibals, implying that she herself joined them out of necessity. Thalia returns with the others (credited as Breather, Wax, Worm, and Gauze) who all congregate outside the house. When Thalia doesn't hear Royce, she tries to convince Pumpkin that Wendy is not good. They manage to kill Gauze from the inside and the rest of them eat him, while Thalia takes her "medicine", actually drugs.

Pumpkin and Wendy proceed to defend themselves against the others, successfully killing Breather, Wax, and Worm, though the latter ends up injecting Pumpkin with some drugs before he dies. Thalia enters the house and knocks out Wendy before chasing after Pumpkin. Pumpkin manages to trick Thalia into finishing off Royce; Thalia then angrily corners her. Pumpkin uses some of Wendy's hallucinatory powder on Thalia before Wendy recovers and knocks Thalia out. In the morning, Pumpkin and Wendy choose to leave Thalia alive, taking her wig (revealing that she is bald, presumably from her constant drug use) and sending her away; she vows that she will return.

Pumpkin and Wendy bury all the bodies before they both decide to leave. Taking whatever is left of the Halloween decorations, the two ride their bikes down the road in the hope of finding sanctuary.

== Cast ==
- Milly Shapiro as Pumpkin
- Ajani Russell as Wendy
- A. J. Bowen as Royce
- Shannyn Sossamon as Thalia
- Vic Plajas as Breather
- Taylor Valentine Lupini as Wax
- Logan Beveridge as Worm
- Bobby McFarlane as Gauze

== Production ==
In November 2024, it was reported that filmmaker Ben Sottak would be writing, directing, and producing a horror thriller film starring Milly Shapiro. In April 2026, Shudder acquired the distribution rights to the film.

== Release ==
Hallowarrior had its world premiere at the Tribeca Festival on June 10, 2026. It was released in the United States on October 16, 2026. The film makes its streaming premiere on the same date during Shudder's 2026 Season of Screams horror film screening marathon.
