= William Berloni =

American animal behaviorist

William "Bill" Berloni is an American animal behaviorist, humanitarian, and author, known for his training of rescue and breeder animals for stage, film, and television. He has been the subject of a Discovery Family reality show that premiered in August 2015.

== Personal life ==
Bill Berloni graduated from Berlin high school in Connecticut desiring to be an actor. While a theater major at Central Connecticut State University he apprenticed at the Goodspeed Opera House in East Haddam, Connecticut. During his second season of volunteering at Goodspeed, the producer Martin Charnin offered him an opportunity to get in the Actors' Equity Association. The offer was contingent upon his finding and training a dog for the new musical they were producing called Annie. He agreed and adopted his first Sandy dog. Since that first Sandy, Bill has not only given acting careers to many shelter dogs in film, television and stage, but also has found homes for thousands of dogs over the years.

== Career ==
Bill Berloni starred in Discovery Family Network Reality Show "From Wags to Riches with Bill Berloni" that premiered August 2015.

Berloni is American Animal Advocate and Behaviorist for the Humane Society of New York.

Bill Berloni is the only animal trainer to have been honored with a Tony and was presented with the Tony Honors for Excellence in Theatre during the 65th Tony Awards.

Bill Berloni is known for training numerous shelter animals for film and television including Charlie Wilson's War, the Disney Channel Original Movie Frenemies, and the Sony Pictures film Annie starring Quvenzhané Wallis and Jamie Foxx that premiered in theaters Christmas 2014.

Bill discovered the newest Sandy, Marti, a 4-year-old Chow Mix who was abandoned at a high kill shelter Georgia then spent two years in various shelters finally ending up in Westchester County, New York where Bill adopted and trained her.

Bill is a published author known for his book Broadway Tail and has been featured on many news shows including Today, CBS Sunday Morning, CBS News and Arise Entertainment 360 TV.

== Filmography ==
Year	Title	Studio/Network	Role
2015	Mr. Robot	USA Network	Head Animal Trainer
2015	From Wags to Riches with Bill Berloni	Discovery Family	Self
2015	Peter Pan Live!	NBC	Head Animal Trainer
2014–2015	Power	Starz	Head Animal Trainer
2014	The Leftovers	HBO	Head Animal Trainer
2014	Deep in the Darkness	Chiller	Head Animal Trainer
2012	Frenemies	Disney Channel	Head Animal Trainer
2012	Hope Springs	Columbia Pictures	Head Animal Trainer
2012	Annie's Search for Sandy	NBC	Producer
2005	The Producers	Universal Studios	Head Animal Trainer

== Awards and nominations ==
Year	Award
2014	Outer Critics Circle Award
2014	Pet Philanthropy Circle Pet Hero Award
2011	Tony Honors for Excellence in Theatre
