= Oona Laurence =

American actress (born 2002)

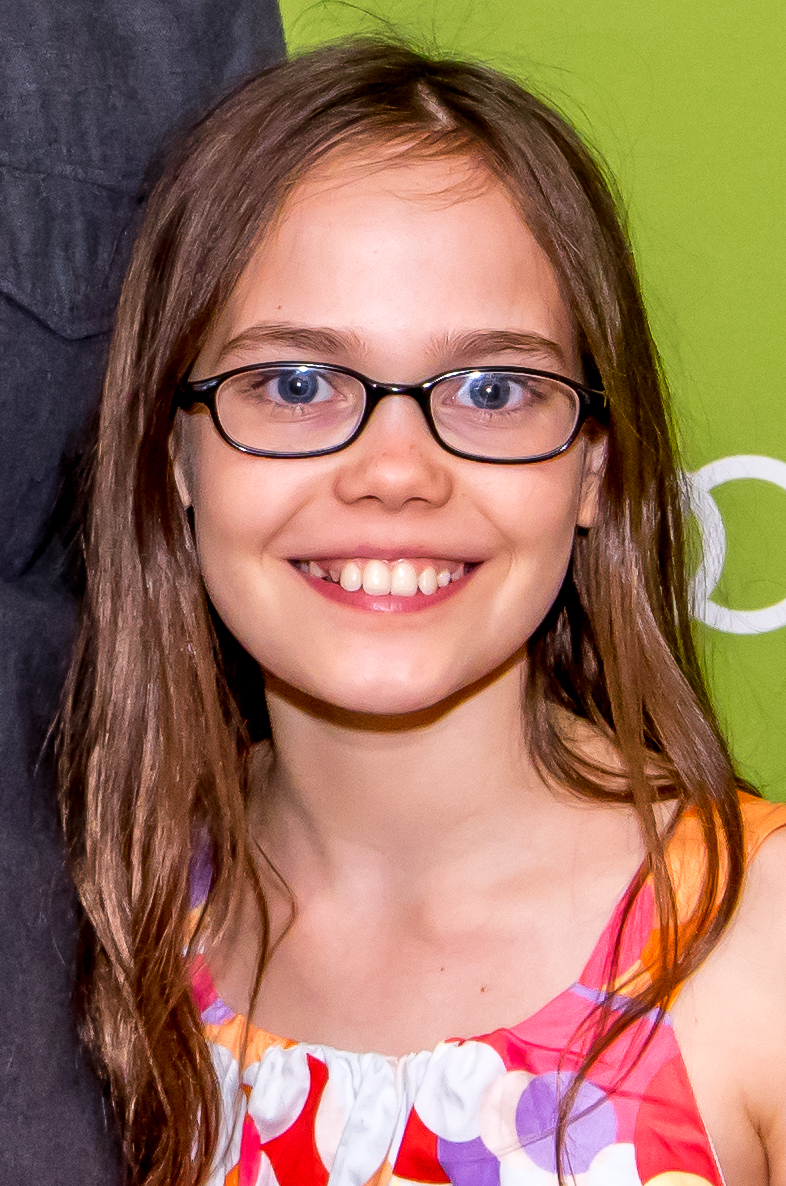
- Laurence in May 2015
- Born: August 1, 2002 (age 24); New York City, New York, U.S.
- Occupation: Actress
- Years active: 2009–present

Oona Laurence (born August 1, 2002) is an American actress. She is best known for the roles of Leila Hope in Southpaw and Matilda Wormwood in Matilda on Broadway alongside Bailey Ryon, Milly Shapiro, and Sophia Gennusa. She began her career as a New York City-based child actress, with credits in film, theatre, and television.

== Life and career ==
Laurence was born August 1, 2002, and lives in New York City and has two sisters. After several appearances in regional theatre productions and minor roles in short films and television episodes, Laurence auditioned for the new musical Matilda on Broadway in 2012. Laurence landed the role of Matilda, performing in the show from March 4 to December 15, 2013. She performed alongside Bailey Ryon, Milly Shapiro, and Sophia Gennusa.

After Matilda, Laurence transitioned to film acting, appearing in Tumorhead, A Little Game, The Grief of Others, I Smile Back, Damsel, Lamb, and Southpaw, portraying the daughter of Jake Gyllenhaal and Rachel McAdams' characters. She has appeared on television in Law & Order: Special Victims Unit and Orange Is the New Black.

In 2016, she co-starred as Natalie in the film Pete's Dragon, and portrayed Jane Mitchell, the daughter of Mila Kunis' character Amy Mitchell, in Bad Moms. In 2017, Laurence co-starred opposite Colin Farrell, Nicole Kidman, Kirsten Dunst, and Elle Fanning in Sofia Coppola's The Beguiled.

She is the voice of Hedgehog and additional characters in the Cartoon Network series Summer Camp Island. She also performs the theme song. In 2020, she starred in the Netflix American family dark fantasy film A Babysitter's Guide to Monster Hunting alongside Tom Felton, Indya Moore, and Tamara Smart.

== Filmography ==
=== Film ===
Year	Title	Role	Notes
2012	Wet Cement	Girl	Short
2012	Esther	Esther	Short
2013	Penny Dreadful	Little Girl	Short
2013	Correcting. Perplexing. Patrick.	Jessica Barnwell	
2014	A Little Game	Becky	
2014	Tumorhead	Jean	Short
2015	I Smile Back	Daisy	
2015	Lamb	Tommie	
2015	Imaginapped	Olivia	Short
2015	Southpaw	Leila Hope	
2015	The Grief of Others	Biscuit Ryrie	
2015	Damsel	Ava	
2015	Vicky & Jonny	Young Vicky	Short
2016	Little Boxes	Ambrosia Reed	
2016	Bad Moms	Jane Mitchell	
2016	Pete's Dragon	Natalie	
2016	Lily + Mara	Lily	Short
2017	The Beguiled	Amy	
2017	A Bad Moms Christmas	Jane Mitchell	
2019	Big Time Adolescence	Sophie	
2020	Lost Girls	Sarra Gilbert	
2020	What We Found	Holly	
2020	A Babysitter's Guide to Monster Hunting	Liz Lerue	
2025	DOE EYED	Coco	Short

=== Television ===
Year	Title	Role	Notes
2011	Celebrity Ghost Stories	Young Phyllis / Phyllis' Daughter	Episode: "Beverley Mitchell/Mark Curry/Donovan Leitch/Phyllis Diller"
2012	Louie	Spiteful Mean Girl #4	Episode: "Looking for Liz/Lilly Changes"
2014	Law & Order: Special Victims Unit	Zoe Harris	Episode: "Glasgowman's Wrath"
2015	Orange Is the New Black	10 Year Old Tiffany	Episode: "A Tittin' and a Hairin'"
2016	Blindspot	Maya Ahmadi	Episode: "Swift Hardhearted Stone"
2018–2023	Summer Camp Island	Hedgehog / Additional Voices (voice)	Main role

== Theatre ==
Year	Title	Role	Notes
2013	Matilda the Musical	Matilda Wormwood	Broadway, Sam S. Shubert Theatre

== Awards and nominations ==
Year	Award	Category	Work	Result
2013	Tony Award	Tony Honors for Excellence in Theatre (shared with Sophia Gennusa, Bailey Ryon and Milly Shapiro)	Matilda the Musical	Won
2013	Grammy Award	Grammy Award for Best Musical Theater Album	Matilda the Musical	Nominated
2015	Hell's Half Mile Film & Music Festival	Best Actress	Lamb	Nominated
2015	Washington D.C. Area Film Critics Association	Best Youth Performance	Southpaw	Nominated
2016	Young Entertainer Award	Best Leading Young Actress- Feature Film	Southpaw	Nominated
2017	Young Artist Award	Best Performance in a Feature Film - Leading Teen Actress	Pete's Dragon	Won
