= Julia Pott =

English animator

- Born: 13 June 1985 (age 41); Shenley, England
- Education: Kingston University; Royal College of Art
- Notable work: Summer Camp Island
- Spouse: Raviv Ullman (m. 2023)
- Children: 1
- Website: www.juliapott.com

Julia Pott (born 13 June 1985) is a British animator, illustrator, screenwriter, producer, and voice actress. She is the creator of Cartoon Network's Summer Camp Island, as well as the voice of Susie McCallister.

== Early life and education ==
Pott, having an American mother, spent her childhood summers in The Hamptons and from the age of 6 was regularly drawing, telling people she wanted to be a cartoonist and work for Disney.

She completed a Foundation Diploma in Art and Design at Chelsea College of Arts in 2004, and studied Animation and Illustration at Kingston University, completing her Bachelor of Arts (Hons) in 2007. While at Kingston, her short animation My First Crush gained her attention and by 2012 had received nearly 1.5 million views on YouTube.

After graduating from Kingston, Pott made animated visuals for musical groups The Decemberists and Bat for Lashes, then enrolled in an MA in animation from the Royal College of Art, where she directed the animated shorts Howard (2010) and Belly (2011). After graduating with honors in 2011, she moved to Brooklyn and then to Los Angeles.

== Career ==
Pott's films have competed at festivals around the world, including Sundance and SXSW. After working as a writer on the animated television series Adventure Time, Pott developed her own series, Summer Camp Island, which debuted on Cartoon Network in 2018 and is available on Max internationally (although the series was removed from HBO Max in the United States in August 2022).

The series was based on a short film by the same name which appeared at Sundance and focuses on an elephant named Oscar and his best friend Hedgehog and their adventures at a magical summer camp.

In November 2021, Pott also joined production studio Hornet and said she hoped to see her work used in fashion and textiles.

== Personal life ==
On May 13, 2023, Pott married Israeli-American actor Raviv Ullman.

== Filmography ==
=== Films ===
| Year | Title | Roles | Note | Source |
|---|---|---|---|---|
| 2015 | World of Tomorrow | Emily (voice) | Short film | |
| 2017 | World of Tomorrow Episode Two: The Burden of Other People's Thoughts | Emily 6 (voice) | Short film | |
| 2020 | World of Tomorrow Episode Three: The Absent Destinations of David Prime | Emily 9 (voice) | Short film | |

=== Television ===
| Year | Title | Roles | Note | Source |
|---|---|---|---|---|
| 2018–2023 | Summer Camp Island | Susie (voice) | Main role | |
| 2022 | We Baby Bears | Susie (voice) | Guest role | |
