= Biff Liff =

American Broadway stage manager and producer

- Born: Samuel Liff; April 14, 1919; Boston, Massachusetts, U.S.
- Died: August 10, 2015 (aged 96); Yorktown Heights, New York, U.S.
- Education: Carnegie Mellon University
- Occupations: Producer, manager
- Spouse: Lisette Liff
- Parent(s): Morris Liff; Rose Liff
- Relatives: Vincent Liff (nephew)

Samuel "Biff" Liff (April 14, 1919 – August 10, 2015) was an American Broadway stage manager and producer.

== Early life ==
Samuel Liff was born on April 14, 1919, in Boston, Massachusetts. His father, Morris Liff, was a restaurateur. His mother was Rose Liff. He was nicknamed 'Biff' as a child, and kept the nickname throughout his life.

Liff graduated from Carnegie Mellon University with a bachelor's degree in Theater in 1939. During World War II, he served as a captain in the United States Army in Chicago.

== Career ==
Liff started his career on Broadway as a stage manager, working on Along Fifth Avenue from January to June 1949. That same year, he was also the stage manager of Admiral Broadway Revue, which was broadcast on television, starring Sid Caesar and Imogene Coca. He then became the stage manager of Gentlemen Prefer Blondes and Hello, Dolly!, both starring Carol Channing By 1954, he was production stage manager on By the Beautiful Sea. In 1956, he was the production stage manager of My Fair Lady starring Julie Andrews on Broadway.

In the 1960s, he was an associate producer to impresario David Merrick on Promises, Promises, Cactus Flower, The Roar of the Greasepaint – The Smell of the Crowd, Rosencrantz and Guildenstern Are Dead, Marat/Sade, and Oliver!. Additionally, he was an associate producer to Merrick on Woody Allen's Don't Drink the Waterin 1966 and Play It Again, Sam in 1969. In 1973, he produced Tricks.

Liff joined William Morris Agency as the head of its theater department in 1973. He became the manager of Julie Andrews, Jane Alexander, Angela Lansbury, Agnes de Mille, Chita Rivera, Ellen Burstyn and Jerry Herman. He was the representative of Eugene O’Neill's estate, and encouraged the 1999 Broadway adaptation of The Iceman Cometh starring Kevin Spacey.

Liff served on the nominating committee of the Tony Awards. He was the recipient of the 2006 Tony Honors for Excellence in Theatre.

Liff's extensive production files are held at the Billy Rose Theatre Division of the New York Public Library for the Performing Arts and are accessible to the public.

== Personal life ==
Biff was married to Arlene Liff. Arlene died of cancer in 1986. Later he married Lisette Liff. They resided in Yorktown Heights, New York.

== Death ==
He died on August 10, 2015, in Yorktown Heights, New York. On August 14, 2015, the lights were dimmed over Broadway in his honor. The president of The Broadway League, Charlotte St. Martin, said he had influenced "legendary productions and a galaxy of talented artists".
