= Liquid Impact Forming =

Metalworking process

Liquid Impact Forming is a metalworking process in which the combined use of a stamping press and a liquid medium forms the desired shape on the workpiece. This technique is a synthesis of two metalworking processes; stamping (metalworking) and hydroforming. It is especially suited for the cold forming of tubular structural parts in automotive, railroad and aerospace industries.

The process is based on a patent by Stanley Ash from the Greenville Tool & Die Company in Greenville, Michigan.

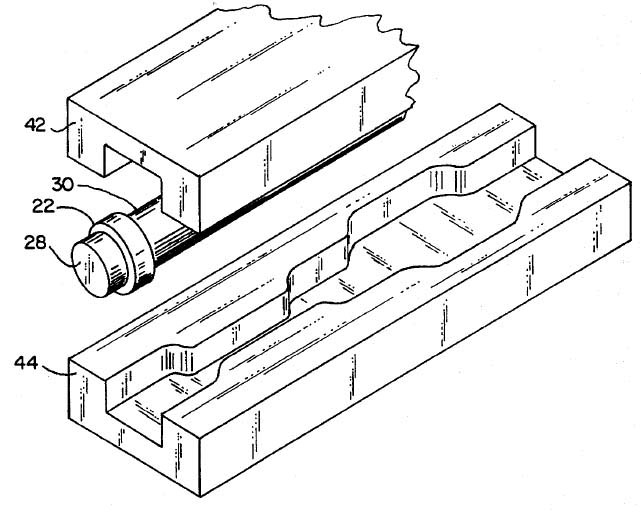
General setup of the liquid impact forming process[1]. Upon closing of the die sections 42 and 44, the liquid inside the tube 30 resists compression and forces the tube walls to conform to the die cavity shape.

== Process ==
Liquid impact forming uses the principles of hydroforming process with conventional stamping equipment. Even though hydroforming offers great advantages over conventional tube stamping through the reduction of manufacturing steps and the reduction of variation in workpieces, it still requires expensive mechanical equipment such as dies to withstand extreme pressures and pressurizing equipment such as pumps and intensifiers. As an alternative to this, the liquid impact forming utilizes the increase in the internal pressure of the liquid inside of a tube during the stamping process, eliminating the need for the use of above mentioned equipment.

The process includes the following stages:

1. A metal tube is filled with a liquid, preferably water and placed between lower and upper die sections of stamping dies.

2. The ends of the liquid-filled tube are sealed to confine the liquid within the tube at approximately atmospheric pressure.

3. The liquid-filled sealed tube is stamped in a conventional die to form the tube into a desired configuration, such as a box-shaped structural member. The compressive forces produced as the die closes to form stamped tube also compress the liquid within the interior of the sealed tube as it changes shape. Thus, the pressure of the liquid increases as the die closes. As the liquid resists compression, it forces the tube walls outwardly toward the interior surface of the die cavity. Once die sections are fully closed around the sealed tube, the tube walls take the shape of the die cavity.

4. The remaining liquid is drained from the formed tube.

== Applications and Variations ==
The liquid impact forming process is especially advantageous for the cold forming of tubular structural parts in automotive, railroad and aerospace industries. It may be used in the cold forming of cylindrical or non-cylindrical parts. It is limited for the applications requiring extensive metal flow or bulging because of the absence of external pressure utilization as in hydroforming.

One further variation of the liquid impact forming comprises the use of a change-of-state material in liquid state in order to prevent the tube wall from buckling or wrinkling during piercing. The change-of-state material can be water or a metallic lead-bismuth alloy. The liquid can be frozen before the stamping phase. After stamping, the liquid can be melted and drained from the shaped tube. Other applications of the process would be the piercing or bulging of tubes, which could also include the use of the change-of-state material.
