= Lif (song) =

2022 single by SCH

Single by Sch

from the album Autobahn
- Released: 27 October 2022
- Length: 3:14
- Label: Rec. 118; Warner Music France
- Songwriter: Julien Schwarzer
- Producer: Lil Ben

Sch singles chronology
"Speciale" (2022)	"Lif" (2022)	"Niobe" (2022)

Music video
- "Lif" on YouTube

"Lif" is a song by French rapper SCH. It was released on 27 October 2022, as a single from his second mixtape Autobahn and peaked atop the French Singles Chart.

== Charts ==
Weekly chart performance for "Lif"
Chart (2022)	Peak position
Belgium (Ultratop 50 Wallonia)	35
France (SNEP)	1
Switzerland (Schweizer Hitparade)	43
