= Vincent Liff =

American casting director

- Born: Vincent Graham Liff; June 30, 1950; West Hartford, Connecticut
- Died: February 25, 2003 (aged 52); New York City, USA
- Occupation: Casting director
- Parent: George Liff
- Relatives: Biff Liff (uncle)

Vincent Liff (c. 1951–2003) was an American casting director of Broadway musicals and plays. According to NPR, he "changed the face of Broadway by bringing more children, minorities and foreigners to the stage."

== Early life ==
Vincent Liff was born in June 30th, 1950 in West Hartford, Connecticut. His uncle Biff Liff, was a Broadway manager and producer.

== Career ==
After graduating from Kalamazoo College in Kalamazoo, Michigan, Liff moved to New York City in 1973. He was a casting director. In the 1970s, he met Geoffrey Johnson through his uncle. Together, they founded Liff-Johnson, a casting agency. Their first casting job was for The Wiz, a 1975 musical on Broadway. They went on to cast two more Broadway musicals: Ain't Misbehavin' in 1978, and Dreamgirls in 1981. Additionally, they cast the following plays: Night and Day, Indiscretions, The Elephant Man, Morning's at Seven, Amadeus, The Dresser, Contact, and The Producers.

According to NPR, he "changed the face of Broadway by bringing more children, minorities and foreigners to the stage."

== Personal life ==
Liff was openly gay. He was in a romantic relationship with Ken Yung. They resided in Manhattan, New York City.

== Death ==
He died of brain cancer in 2003.
