= The Queen's Nose (TV series) =

British children's television series (1995–2003)

- Title Card
- Genre: Children's Drama
- Created by: Dick King-Smith (original adaption); Steve Attridge (series 2–3)
- Developed by: BBC; Film and General Productions Ltd
- Starring: Victoria Shalet; Paula Wilcox
- Theme music composer: Carl Davis
- Country of origin: United Kingdom
- Original language: English
- No. of series: 7
- No. of episodes: 42 (list of episodes)

Production
- Production location: London
- Running time: 25 minutes

Original release
- Network: BBC One
- Release: 15 November 1995 – 16 December 2003

The Queen's Nose is a 1995 BBC children's television series. It was adapted by Steve Attridge from the novel of the same name written by Dick King-Smith. It ran for seven series.

== Premise ==
Harmony Parker, a twelve-year-old girl who loves animals, receives a magical 50-pence coin from her Uncle Ginger that can grant wishes when Queen Elizabeth II's nose is rubbed.

== Production ==
The novel was adapted into three television series by the BBC which were broadcast during the CBBC slot between 1995 and 1998. The stories remained faithful to the book, although in the book Harmony is granted only seven wishes compared to the ten wishes being granted upon rubbing the coin in the TV series. The first series by Steve Attridge, directed by Carol Wiseman and edited by Sue Robinson, won the Royal Television Society 1996 award for best Children's Drama, and the third series also by Steve Attridge winning the Indie Awards 1999 prize for Digital Cinematography. According to a podtail interview with Victoria Shalet in February 2021, the director Carol Wiseman was responsible for her being cast in the role of Harmony Parker after she had been impressed with the actress after working with her on the TV series Goggle-Eyes in 1993.

In 2000, the BBC revived the series with new stories, but without the main character Harmony, with a further four series being made between 2000 and 2003. Many viewers felt that the departure from the novels and the loss of the main character, played by Shalet, diminished the series. The later series did however still feature other members of the Parker family in various roles. Harmony's sister Melody, played by Heather-Jay Jones, stayed on until the penultimate series. As of 2010, The Queen's Nose was no longer repeated on the CBBC Channel.

The Queen's Nose has also been broadcast in Germany, under the name Die Magische Münze (The Magic Coin).

== Cast ==
- Harmony Parker – Victoria Shalet (series 1–4)
- Melody Parker – Heather-Jay Jones (series 1–6)
- Mr Arthur Parker – Stephen Moore (series 1–2, 4–5)
- Mrs Audrey Parker – Paula Wilcox (series 1–2, 4–5)
- Uncle Ginger – Donald Sumpter (series 1–3)
- Gregory – Callum Dixon (series 1–3, 6)
- Tom – Anthony Hamblin (series 1, 2)
- Granny – Liz Smith (series 2)
- Aunt Glenda – Nerys Hughes (series 3)
- Dino – Vicki Lee Taylor (series 3)
- Grobler – Ian Reddington (series 3)
- Himself – Gary Mabbutt (series 1)
- Himself – Tony Blackburn (series 2)
- Paul – Joe Cadden (series 2, 7)
- Sam – Ella Jones (series 4–6, 7)
- Sophie – Dominique Moore (series 4–6, 7)
- Mrs Dooley – Annette Badland (series 4, 5)
- Aaron – Darryl Hutton (series 4)
- Pansy – Grace Atherton (series 4–6)
- Emily – Montanna Thompson (series 4)
- Melody's Agent – Paul Danan (series 6)
- Jake – Jordan Metcalfe (series 7)
- Gemma – Lucinda Dryzek (series 7)
- Chief – David Sterne (series 7)
- Wesley – Joshua Garland (series 7)
- Duncan – Nicholas Gleaves (series 7)
- Nick – Brock Everitt-Elwick (series 7)
- Carla – Juliet Cowan (series 7)
- Ben – Pablo Duarte (series 6, 7)
- Mr Marsh – Bill Bingham (series 7)
- Darren – Andrew James Michel (series 7)
- Frank – Martin Jarvis (series 7)
- Frank Puppeteer – William Todd-Jones (series 7)
- Judge – Bob Goody (series 4–one episode)

=== Owners of The Queen's Nose ===
- Harmony Parker (series 1 to 3)
- Dino Parker (series 3 alongside Harmony)
- Sam (series 4 to 6)
- Jake (series 7)

== Episodes ==
Series	Episodes	First air date	Last air date
1	6	15 November 1995	20 December 1995
2	6	13 November 1996	18 December 1996
3	6	18 November 1998	23 December 1998
Specials	2	30 December 1999	28 August 2000
4	6	13 November 2000	18 December 2000
5	6	24 September 2001	29 October 2001
6	6	23 September 2002	30 October 2002
7	6	11 November 2003	16 December 2003

== VHS ==
Title	Release date	Country	Distributor	BBFC classification	Ref.
The Queen's Nose: Episodes 1 & 2	15 September 1997	United Kingdom	Carlton	U	
The Queen's Nose (Series 1)	11 November 2002	United Kingdom	ITC	U	
The Queen's Nose: Harmony's Return (Series 2)	11 November 2002	United Kingdom	ITC	U	
The Queen's Nose: Harmony's Holiday (Series 3)	11 November 2002	United Kingdom	ITC	PG	

== Radio dramatisation ==
In 2011 The Queen's Nose was adapted for radio by Elizabeth Kuti and the hour-long drama was broadcast on Radio 4 Extra on Sunday 26 June 2011. The programme was produced by Heather Larmour.

=== Radio dramatisation cast ===
- Harmony Parker – Lauren Mote
- Uncle Ginger – Rupert Graves
- Mr Parker – Richard Lumsden
- Mrs Parker – Matilda Ziegler
- Melody Parker – Holly Bodimeade

== Ratings (CBBC Channel) ==
Week	Viewers	Notes
Monday 13 May 2002	50,000	2nd most watched on CBBC that week.
Tuesday 21 May 2002	50,000	3rd most watched on CBBC that week.
Wednesday 5 June 2002	70,000	2nd most watched on CBBC that week.
Monday 3 June 2002	50,000	5th most watched on CBBC that week.
Thursday 13 June 2002	20,000	8th most watched on CBBC that week.
Monday 17 June 2002	30,000	10th most watched on CBBC that week.
