= List of The Queen's Nose episodes =

The Queen's Nose is a British television series based on the children's novel by Dick King-Smith. The series, which broadcast on BBC One (CBBC), was adapted by Steve Attridge, and ran from 15 November 1995 to 16 December 2003 for seven series and 42 episodes.

== Series overview ==
Series	Episodes	Originally released	
Series	Episodes	First released	Last released
1	6	15 November 1995	20 December 1995
2	6	13 November 1996	18 December 1996
3	6	18 November 1998	23 December 1998
Specials	2	30 December 1999	28 August 2000
4	6	13 November 2000	18 December 2000
5	6	24 September 2001	29 October 2001
6	6	23 September 2002	30 October 2002
7	6	11 November 2003	16 December 2003

== Episodes ==
=== Series 1 (1995) ===
No. overall	Title	Directed by	Written by	Original release date
1	"Episode 1"	Carol Wiseman	Steve Attridge	15 November 1995
Harmony is a twelve-year-old girl who loves animals. Harmony and her friend Tom, have set up an amateur veterinary practice in Harmony's back garden due to her parents forbidding her from having a pet. Later, Harmony's Uncle "Ginger" visits, he gives her a 50 pence coin that can grant eight wishes.
2	"Episode 2"	Carol Wiseman	Steve Attridge	22 November 1995
Harmony uses her first wish for a rabbit. However, her family don't share Harmony's love for Anita the rabbit. Harmony then wishes that her family was different and then she soon realizes that change isn't always for the better.
3	"Episode 3"	Carol Wiseman	Steve Attridge	29 November 1995
Mrs. Parker takes Harmony's magical 50 pence piece and spends it. Harmony later recovers it and wishes for a bike but as well as the bike comes other problems that her family are not too happy about.
4	"Episode 4"	Carol Wiseman	Steve Attridge	6 December 1995
The magical 50 pence piece goes missing and Harmony discovers the missing coin is caused by her sister Melody. Harmony then sets to seek revenge on Melody.
5	"Episode 5"	Carol Wiseman	Steve Attridge	13 December 1995
Summer holidays are over and it is time to return to school but Harmony does not want to go back, so she decides to use the Queen's Nose to stay off school. She ends up in hospital and then offers to grant her sister Melody a wish.
6	"Episode 6"	Carol Wiseman	Steve Attridge	20 December 1995

=== Series 2 (1996) ===
No. overall	Title	Directed by	Written by	Original release date
7	"Episode 1"	Carol Wiseman	Steve Attridge	13 November 1996
8	"Episode 2"	Carol Wiseman	Steve Attridge	20 November 1996
9	"Episode 3"	Carol Wiseman	Steve Attridge	27 November 1996
10	"Episode 4"	Carol Wiseman	Steve Attridge	4 December 1996
11	"Episode 5"	Carol Wiseman	Steve Attridge	11 December 1996
12	"Episode 6"	Carol Wiseman	Steve Attridge	18 December 1996

=== Series 3 (1998) ===
No. overall	Title	Directed by	Written by	Original release date
13	"Episode 1"	Carol Wiseman	Steve Attridge	18 November 1998
Harmony and Melody are living with their Aunt Glenda on a canal barge.
14	"Episode 2"	Carol Wiseman	Steve Attridge	25 November 1998
Gregory and Harmony set up a garden centre together but the plants wither.
15	"Episode 3"	Carol Wiseman	Steve Attridge	2 December 1998
Puddle turns out to be the coin thief, and Aunt Glenda is convinced that Dino is a boy.
16	"Episode 4"	Carol Wiseman	Steve Attridge	9 December 1998
Gus threatens to blow up the garden centre when Melody rejects his advances.
17	"Episode 5"	Carol Wiseman	Graham Alborough	16 December 1998
Harmony and Dino are brought closer together when they discover they are cousins.
18	"Episode 6"	Carol Wiseman	Steve Attridge	23 December 1998
Dino tells Harmony about Block, a shady Fagin type who used her as an artful dodger.

=== Specials (1999–2000) ===
Two specials which broadcast in 1999 and 2000 are feature-length versions for both series two and series three.

Title	Directed by	Written by	Original release date
"Harmony's Return"	Carol Wiseman	Steve Attridge	30 December 1999
"Harmony's Holiday"	Carol Wiseman	Steve Attridge	28 August 2000

=== Series 4 (2000) ===
No. overall	Title	Directed by	Written by	Original release date
19	"Episode 1"	Carol Wiseman	Graham Alborough	13 November 2000
An overworked Arthur gets more than he bargained for when he wishes with the coin.
20	"Episode 2"	Carol Wiseman	Graham Alborough	20 November 2000
The Parker family are busy preparing for Harmony's going-away party.
21	"Episode 3"	Carol Wiseman	Graham Alborough	27 November 2000
Jordan puts on Sam's coat - with the Queen's Nose in its pocket.
22	"Episode 4"	Carol Wiseman	Graham Alborough	4 December 2000
Sam grants Jordan and Pansy one wish each, but things go horribly wrong.
23	"Episode 5"	Carol Wiseman	Graham Alborough	11 December 2000
Sam rashly wishes for Audrey's problems and finds they have swapped bodies.
24	"Episode 6"	Carol Wiseman	Graham Alborough	18 December 2000
There's a great deal of confusion involving goats and the social services.

=== Series 5 (2001) ===
No. overall	Title	Directed by	Written by	Original release date
25	"Episode 1"	Carol Wiseman	Graham Alborough	24 September 2001
Audrey and Arthur Parker plan to take the children on holiday, but disaster strikes.
26	"Episode 2"	Carol Wiseman	Graham Alborough	1 October 2001
Arthur and Audrey find an abandoned baby, which they decide to keep.
27	"Episode 3"	Carol Wiseman	Graham Alborough	8 October 2001
Sophie manages to conjure up a magical barn.
28	"Episode 4"	Carol Wiseman	Graham Alborough	15 October 2001
A surprise picnic is organised for Sam's birthday. Simon is smitten with Melody.
29	"Episode 5"	Carol Wiseman	Graham Alborough	22 October 2001
Sam's wish to hear other people's thoughts comes true.
30	"Episode 6"	Carol Wiseman	Graham Alborough	29 October 2001
Nick is determined to prove that he was not responsible for the fire.

=== Series 6 (2002) ===
No. overall	Title	Directed by	Written by	Original release date
31	"Episode 1"	David Skynner	Graham Alborough	23 September 2002
Sam uses the Queen's Nose to improve a run-down fairground ride.
32	"Episode 2"	David Skynner	Graham Alborough	30 September 2002
The girls decide to advertise themselves as a help agency.
33	"Episode 3"	David Skynner	Graham Alborough	9 October 2002
Following Gregory's on-set antics, Melody's video is a disaster.
34	"Episode 4"	David Skynner	Graham Alborough	16 October 2002
Despite Melody's musical success there is still not a lot of money to go around.
35	"Episode 5"	David Skynner	Graham Alborough	23 October 2002
Melody prepares to go on Top of the Pops. The agency has some grotty jobs for the girls.
36	"Episode 6"	David Skynner	Graham Alborough	30 October 2002
Melody is in a permanent bad mood after the pop show debacle.

=== Series 7 (2003) ===
No. overall	Title	Directed by	Written by	Original release date
37	"Episode 1"	David Skynner	Graham Alborough	11 November 2003
Jake finds the Queen's Nose and accidentally gives his ferret the power of speech.
38	"Episode 2"	David Skynner	Graham Alborough	18 November 2003
Jake wishes to become the coolest boy in school, with surprising results.
39	"Episode 3"	David Skynner	Graham Alborough	25 November 2003
Gemma is sceptical when she finds out about the Queen's Nose.
40	"Episode 4"	David Skynner	Graham Alborough	2 December 2003
The children are roped into helping out at Chief's store after wishing it was busy.
41	"Episode 5"	David Skynner	Graham Alborough	9 December 2003
Jake and Gemma realise Duncan owns the shop that is putting Chief out of business.
42	"Episode 6"	David Skynner	Graham Alborough	16 December 2003
Wesley wishes for a pound every time anyone says `it's mine', but soon piles on weight.
