= Matilda (novel) =

1988 children's novel by Roald Dahl

- First UK edition
- Author: Roald Dahl
- Illustrator: Quentin Blake
- Language: English
- Genre: Children's literature, fantasy
- Published: October 1, 1988
- Publisher: Jonathan Cape
- Publication place: United Kingdom
- Pages: 240

Matilda is a 1988 children's novel by British author Roald Dahl. It was published by Jonathan Cape. The story features Matilda Wormwood, a precocious child with uncaring parents, and her time in a school run by the tyrannical headmistress Miss Trunchbull.

The book has been adapted in various media, including audio readings by actresses Joely Richardson, Miriam Margolyes and Kate Winslet; a 1996 feature film Matilda directed by Danny DeVito; a two-part BBC Radio 4 programme; and a 2010–2011 musical Matilda the Musical which ran on the West End in London, Broadway in New York, and around the world. A film adaptation of the musical was released in 2022.

In 2003, Matilda was listed at number 74 in The Big Read, a BBC survey of the British public of the top 200 novels of all time. In 2012, Matilda was ranked number 30 among all-time best children's novels in a survey published by School Library Journal, a US monthly. Time magazine named Matilda in its list of the "100 Best Young-Adult Books of All Time". In 2012, Matilda Wormwood appeared on a Royal Mail commemorative postage stamp.

== Plot ==
In a small Buckinghamshire village 40 minutes by bus away from Reading and 8 miles (13 km) from Aylesbury, Matilda Wormwood is born to Mr. and Mrs. Wormwood. She immediately shows amazing precocity, learning to speak at age one-and-a-half and to read at age three, perusing all the children's books in the library by the age of four and a quarter and moving on to longer classics, such as Animal Farm and The Grapes of Wrath. However, her parents (particularly her father) emotionally abuse her and completely refuse to acknowledge her abilities. Mr. Wormwood is a corrupt used-car salesman who finds numerous ways to cheat his customers, and Mrs. Wormwood thinks of nothing but playing bingo and watching television. To keep from getting frustrated, Matilda finds herself forced to pull pranks on them, such as gluing her father's hat to his head, sticking a parrot in the chimney to simulate a burglar or ghost, and bleaching her father's hair with peroxide.

At the age of five and a half, Matilda enters school and befriends her kindly and compassionate teacher, Miss Jennifer Honey, who is astonished by her intellectual abilities. Miss Honey tries to move Matilda into a higher class, but the tyrannical headmistress, Miss Agatha Trunchbull, refuses. Miss Honey also tries to talk to Mr. and Mrs. Wormwood about their daughter's intelligence, but they ignore her, with the mother contending that "brainy-ness" is an undesirable trait in a little girl.

Miss Trunchbull later confronts a girl called Amanda Thripp for wearing pigtails (the headmistress repeatedly displays a dislike of long hair throughout the book) and does a hammer throw with the girl over the playground fence. Later, a boy called Bruce Bogtrotter is caught by the cook stealing a piece of Miss Trunchbull's cake, and the headmistress makes him attempt to eat an 18-inch (46 cm)-wide cake in front of the assembly, then smashes the platter over his head in a fit of rage after he unexpectedly succeeds (although Bruce is so completely stuffed with cake, he does not even feel the blow).

Matilda develops a strong bond with Miss Honey, and watches as Trunchbull terrorizes her students with punishments that are deliberately creative and over-the-top to prevent parents from believing them, such as throwing them in a dark closet lined with nails and broken glass dubbed "The Chokey". When Matilda's friend Lavender plays a practical joke on Trunchbull by placing a newt in her jug of water, Matilda is blamed; in anger, she uses an unexpected power of telekinesis to tip the glass of water containing the newt onto Trunchbull.

Matilda reveals her new powers to Miss Honey, who confides that after her wealthy father, Dr Magnus Honey, suspiciously died in her youth, she was raised by an abusive aunt, revealed to be Miss Trunchbull. Trunchbull appears, among other misdeeds, to be withholding her niece's inheritance; Miss Honey has to live in poverty in a derelict farm cottage, and her salary is being paid into Miss Trunchbull's bank account for the first 10 years of her teaching career while she is restricted to £1 per week in pocket money. Determined to avenge Miss Honey, Matilda practices her telekinesis at home. Later, during a sadistic lesson that Miss Trunchbull is teaching, Matilda telekinetically raises a piece of chalk to the blackboard and uses it to write, posing as the spirit of Magnus Honey. Addressing Miss Trunchbull using her first name (Agatha), "Magnus" demands that Miss Trunchbull hand over Miss Honey's house and wages and leave the school, causing Miss Trunchbull to faint.

The next day, the school's deputy headmaster, Mr. Trilby, visits Trunchbull's house and finds it empty, except for signs of Trunchbull's hasty exit. She is never seen again and, the next day, Miss Honey receives a letter from a local solicitor's office, telling her that her father's lifetime savings were safe in her bank and the property she lived in as a child was left to her. Mr. Trilby becomes the new headmaster, proving himself to be capable and good-natured, overwhelmingly improving the school's atmosphere and curriculum, and quickly moving Matilda into the top-form class with the 11-year-olds. Rather to Matilda's relief, she soon is no longer capable of telekinesis. Miss Honey theorizes this is because Matilda is using her brainpower on a more challenging curriculum, leaving less of her brain's enormous energy free.

Matilda continues to visit Miss Honey at her house regularly, returning home one day to find her parents and her older brother, Michael, hastily packing to leave for Spain. Miss Honey explains this is because the police have found out the full extent of Mr. Wormwood's crimes: on top of selling cars with tampered speedometers and engines full of sawdust, he has been receiving stolen cars and disguising them for resale. Matilda asks permission to live with Miss Honey, to which her parents rather distractedly agree. Matilda and Miss Honey thus find their happy ending as a true family, as the Wormwoods drive away, never to be seen again.

== Writing the novel ==
Dahl's initial draft for the novel portrayed Matilda as a wicked, irrational girl—her name being drawn from Hilaire Belloc's poem "Matilda"—who tortured her innocent parents and used her psychokinetic powers to help an unethical teacher win money at horse racing. Dahl's biographer Jeremy Treglown went through the author's documents, including the drafts for the novel, and noted that the American editor Stephen Roxburgh at Farrar, Straus and Giroux had been instrumental in reshaping the story. It was Roxburgh's idea to make Matilda an innocent child who loved books, with her powers manifesting as a result of abuse she endured. Roxburgh also suggested various changes to the main characters that were incorporated into the finished novel. As Dahl decided to take the manuscript to different publishers, the two had a falling out. The edited version of the manuscript was published by Puffin Books. Dahl explained in an interview that he "got it wrong" at first and that the book took over a year to rewrite, though he failed to mention Roxburgh's input.

The "mean and loathsome" Mrs. Pratchett, owner of the sweet shop Dahl frequented as a boy in Cardiff, inspired the character of Miss Trunchbull. Mr. Wormwood was based on a real-life person from Dahl's home village of Great Missenden in Buckinghamshire. The library in Great Missenden was the inspiration for Mrs. Phelps's library, where Matilda devours classic literature by the age of four and three months. On Matilda's love of reading books, Lucy Dahl stated that her father's novel was, in part, about his love for books: "I think that there was a deep genuine fear within his heart that books were going to go away and he wanted to write about it".

== Reception ==
The year after the book was published, it received the 1989 Red House Children's Book Award. In 2000, it received the Blue Peter Book Award. In 2003, Matilda was listed at number 74 in The Big Read, a BBC poll of the British public of the top 200 novels of all time. Nine years later, Matilda was ranked number 30 on a list of the top 100 children's novels published by School Library Journal, a monthly with primarily US audience. It was the first of four books by Dahl among the Top 100, more than any other writer. Time magazine included Matilda in its list of the "100 Best Young-Adult Books of All Time". Worldwide sales have reached 17 million, and since 2016 sales have spiked to the extent that it outsells Dahl's other works. In 2023, the novel was ranked tenth by BBC in their poll of "The 100 greatest children's books of all time".

== Adaptations ==
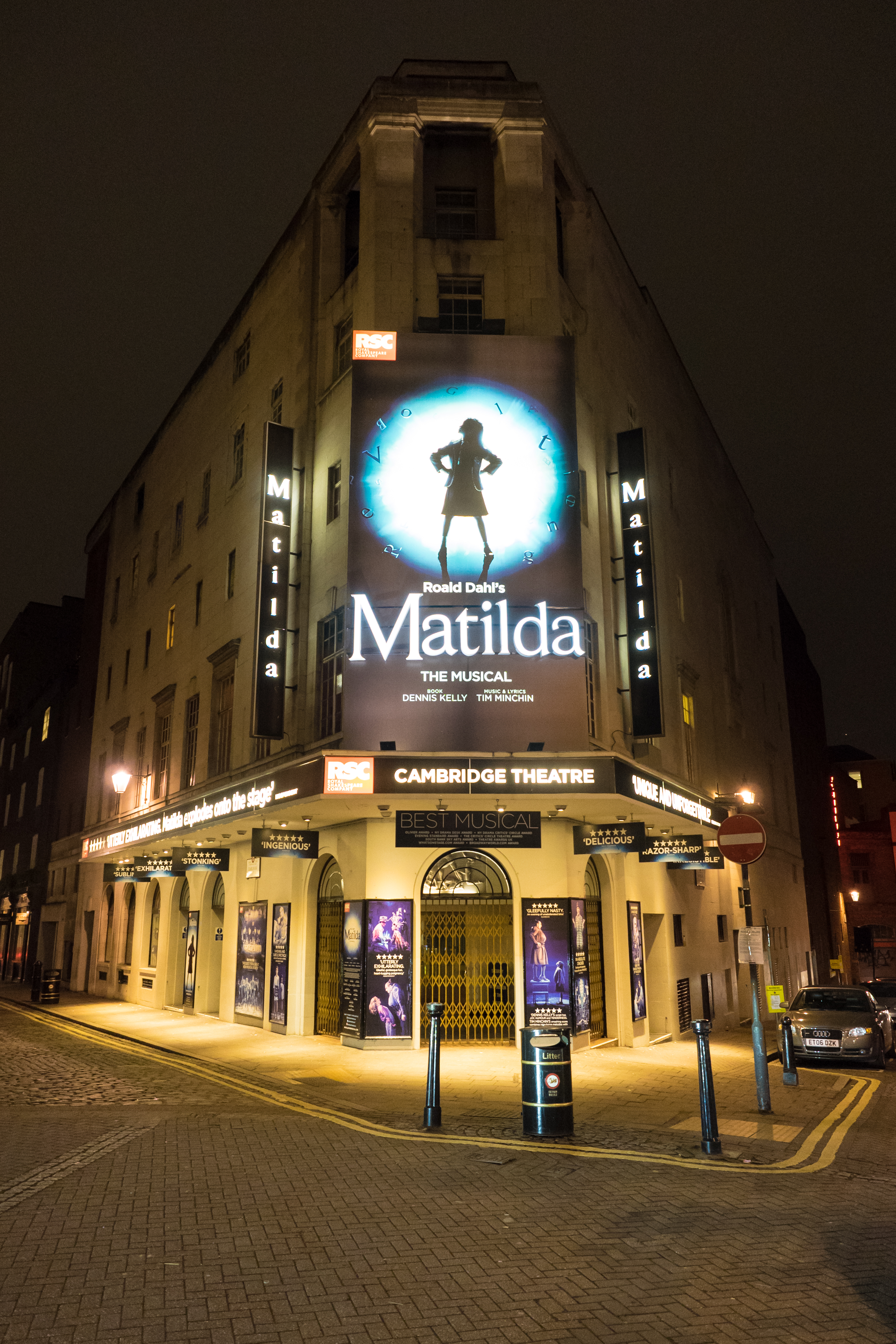
Matilda the Musical has been performed at the Cambridge Theatre in the West End since November 2011

In 1990, the Redgrave Theatre in Farnham produced a musical version, adapted by Rony Robinson with music by Ken Howard and Alan Blaikley, which toured the UK. It starred Annabelle Lanyon as Matilda and Jonathan Linsley as Miss Trunchbull and had mixed reviews. A second musical version of the novel, Matilda the Musical, written by Dennis Kelly and Tim Minchin and commissioned by the Royal Shakespeare Company, premiered in November 2010. It opened at the Cambridge Theatre in the West End on 24 November 2011. It opened on Broadway on 11 April 2013 at the Shubert Theatre. After being on Broadway for three years, "Matilda The Musical" closed on 1 January 2017. The musical has since done a US tour and opened in July 2015 in Australia. The stage version has become hugely popular with audiences and praised by critics, and won multiple Olivier Awards in the UK and Tony Awards in the US. One critic called it "the best British musical since Billy Elliot".

The novel was made into the film Matilda in 1996. It starred Mara Wilson as Matilda, and was directed by Danny DeVito, who also portrayed Mr. Wormwood and narrated the story. The film changed the setting and nationality of every character (except Trunchbull, who is played by Welsh actress Pam Ferris) from British to American. Although not a commercial success, it received critical acclaim at the time of its release and, on Rotten Tomatoes, has a score of 90% based on reviews from 21 critics.

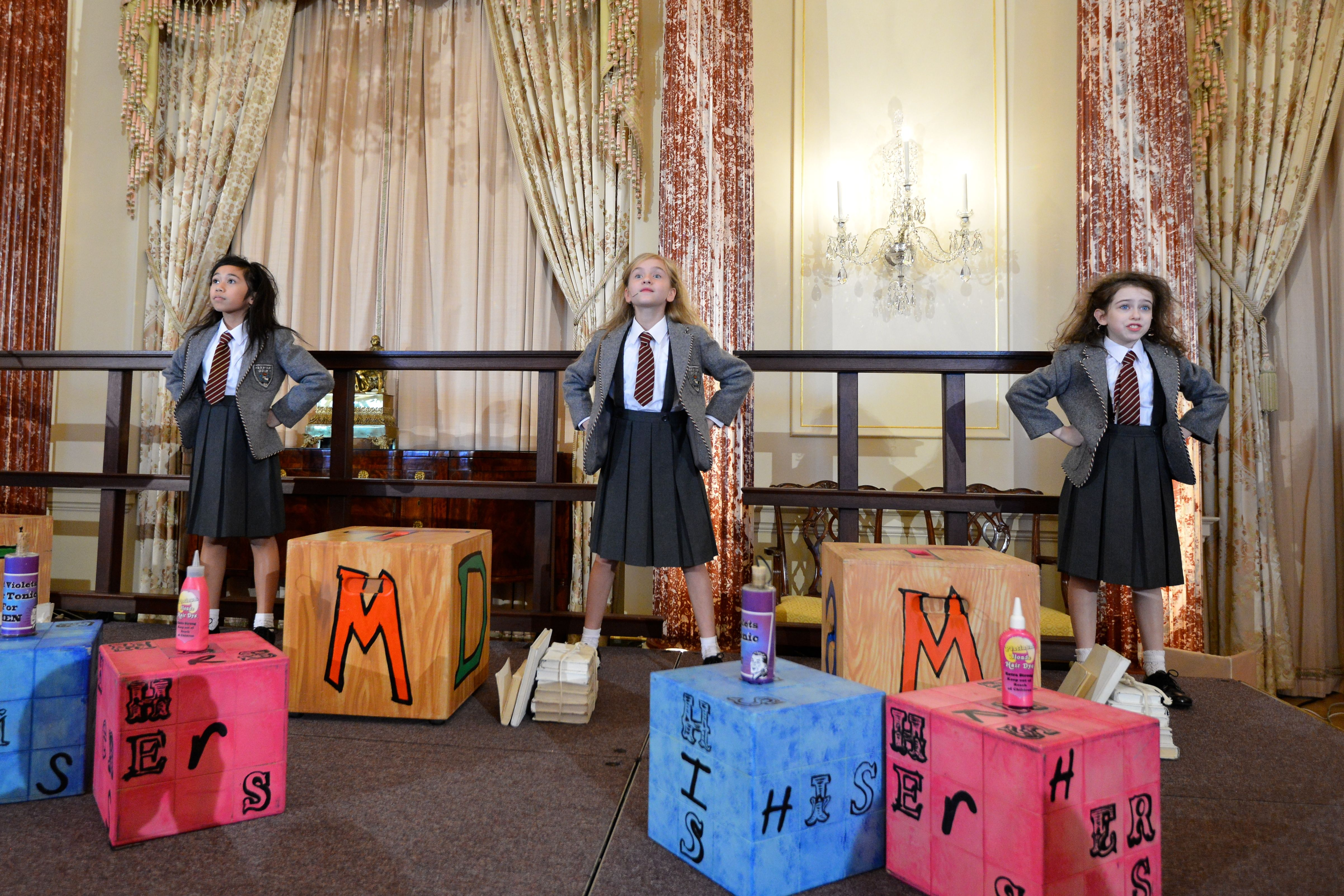
Cast of Matilda the Musical performing the song "Naughty" at the US State Department in Washington, DC, December 2015

In December 2009, BBC Radio 4's Classic Serial broadcast a two-part adaptation by Charlotte Jones of the novel with Lenny Henry as the Narrator, Lauren Mote as Matilda, Nichola McAuliffe as Miss Trunchbull, Emerald O'Hanrahan as Miss Honey, Claire Rushbrook as Mrs Wormwood and John Biggins as Mr Wormwood.

The book has been recorded as an audiobook by at least ten different narrators since the 1980s. In 1998, Miriam Margolyes narrated an abridged recording for Penguin Random House (ISBN 0140868232 on cassette in 1998 and republished as ISBN 978-0141805542 on CD in 2004). In 2004, Joely Richardson narrated the unabridged audiobook for Harper Childrens Audio (ISBN 978-0060582548). In 2013, Kate Winslet narrated an unabridged recording for Listening Library (ISBN 978-1611761849); in 2014, the American Library Association shortlisted her for an Odyssey Award for her performance.

In 2018, Netflix was revealed to be adapting Matilda as an animated series, as part of an "animated event series" along with other Roald Dahl books such as The BFG, The Twits, and Charlie and the Chocolate Factory. A film adaptation of the musical was released by Sony Pictures Releasing and Netflix in 2022. It stars Alisha Weir as Matilda and Emma Thompson as Miss Trunchbull. It is directed by Matthew Warchus.

=== The novel at 30 ===
Celebrating 30 years of the book's publication in October 2018, original illustrator Quentin Blake imagined what Matilda might be doing as a grown-up woman today. He drew images of her undertaking three possible roles: an explorer, an astrophysicist, and a librarian at the British Library.

=== 2023 censorship controversy ===
Despite Roald Dahl having enjoined his publishers not to "so much as change a single comma in one of my books", in February 2023 Puffin Books, a division of Penguin Books, announced it would be re-writing portions of many of Dahl's children's novels, changing the language to, in the publisher's words, "ensure that it can continue to be enjoyed by all today". The decision was met with sharp criticism from groups and public figures including authors Salman Rushdie, Christopher Paolini, British prime minister Rishi Sunak, Queen Camilla, Kemi Badenoch, PEN America, and Brian Cox. Dahl's publishers in the United States, France, and the Netherlands declined to incorporate the changes. Following the backlash, on 23 February, Puffin announced it would release an unedited selection of Dahl's children's books as "The Roald Dahl Classic Collection" because of "the importance of keeping Dahl's classic texts in print".

In Matilda, more than sixty changes were made, including replacing references to Rudyard Kipling and Joseph Conrad with Jane Austen and John Steinbeck, removing references to skin colour (such as "turning white", "beginning to go dark red", "red in the face", and "white as paper"), removing or changing the words fat, mad, and crazy (such as changing "wobbling crazily" to "wobbling unsteadily"), removing the word madonna, and changing heroine to hero.

Original text	2023 text
It is a curious truth that grasshoppers have their hearing-organs in the sides of the abdomen. Your daughter Vanessa, judging by what she's learnt this term, has no hearing-organs at all.	It is a curious truth that grasshoppers have their hearing-organs in the sides of the abdomen. Judging by what your daughter Vanessa has learnt this term, this fact alone is more interesting than anything I have taught in the classroom.

== Connections to other Roald Dahl books ==
One of Miss Trunchbull's punishments is to force an overweight child, Bruce Bogtrotter, to eat an enormous chocolate cake, which makes him so full that he cannot move. The cook had caught him stealing a piece of cake from the kitchen. In Roald Dahl's Revolting Recipes one of the recipes is based on that cake. Bruce is a more sympathetic variation of Augustus Gloop (from Charlie and the Chocolate Factory) and similar gluttons, and he is praised for finishing the cake without suffering nausea. The short story The Magic Finger by Roald Dahl, released in 1966, may have been a precursor to Matilda. A young girl has power within her finger to do things to other people when she gets emotional about a cause she feels strongly about.

== Continuation stories ==
In 2024 a collection of short stories by new writers titled Charlie and the Christmas Factory was published by Puffin including a continuation story on Matilda by Elle McNicoll.

== See also ==
- Attachment theory
- Child abuse
