= The Maid (1990 film) =

- Promotional poster
- Directed by: Ian Toynton
- Written by: Timothy Prager
- Starring: Martin Sheen; Jacqueline Bisset; Victoria Shalet
- Release date: 1990
- Running time: 84 minutes
- Countries: France; United Kingdom; United States
- Language: English

The Maid is a 1990 made-for-TV film directed by Ian Toynton in which Anthony Wayne (Martin Sheen) goes to Paris for a new job and has a 30-day period before he starts work to get settled.

== Plot ==
Anthony Wayne, the head of mergers and acquisitions for a NYC bank, is hired by a Parisian bank to take over for someone who has suddenly left. Nicole Chantrelle is frustrated to not be promoted, as her boss C.P. has head-hunted Wayne rather than consider her.

Anthony is a messy, immature bachelor, who foolishly had a fling with his coworker Elisabeth. He approaches her after he receives C.P. Olivier's offer to see if she will speak with him, but she has moved on and suggests he do the same. Nicole is a single mother, whose young daughter Marie keeps driving away her nannies.

When Anthony arrives in Paris, scouting for an attractive prospect and not able to take up his new job for one month, he catches sight of Nicole. Instantly attracted, he follows her to the domestic help agency where he overhears her desperately pleading for a replacement. Anthony appears at Nicole's door, claiming to be a maid named John. She hires him on the spot. When he sees Marie, he tries to get out of it, but Nicole hurries out.

Initially, Marie is very bratty and difficult. Managing to lock Anthony in her bedroom, once he has freed himself he treats her with a firm hand. By Nicole's return, the house is picked up, Marie has eaten, done her tasks and in bed. Pleased, Nicole declares he is hired.

Determined to reveal the ruse ASAP, in the meantime Anthony hires a crew to clean Nicole's apartment, then meets C.P. for lunch. Nicole has her own 'business lunch' with Laurent Leclair, who clearly shares an attraction with her.

Very happy with him, one evening Nicole invites Anthony to stay for dinner. Afterwards, as they are doing the dishes, she tells him how Marie's father had disappeared from her life before her birth. Nicole asks him about being a maid, and he is not forthcoming with the answers. Anthony takes the recently vacant apartment under Nicole's without telling her.

At work, C.P. tells Nicole to put in motion a 300 million dollar loan to the Leclair Group, and mentions Wayne will be starting the following week. At home, she consults with Anthony about meeting a colleague for dinner. He suggests Nicole make it less intimate by inviting more colleagues. The event grows into an eight-person meal, organised and served by Anthony.

Contracting a catering company to deliver a several-course meal, when Anthony sees C.P., he suddenly realises it is her company that has hired him. Disguising himself by slicking back his hair and ensuring C.P. does not see his face, he is able to keep his cover. After all but Laurent leave, Anthony tries to stick around, but Nicole sends him home.

In the morning, as they having a post-coital breakfast, Laurent breaks the news that he is a married man to Nicole. Distraught they had been intimate, she confides in Anthony. Exclaiming he is very trustworthy, they spend time together and with Marie. They kiss, and Anthony declares he loves her. Nicole insists she could never date an employee. However, she follows him out, finally seeing he moved downstairs. Entering his place, Nicole fires him and declares her feelings.

Spending the night, they wake to his talking alarm, which calls him Anthony Wayne. Shocked, Nicole storms out. At work, Anthony starts his first day there. She tells C.P. she will not work with him then, in the meeting with Laurent, she recommends they not give him the loan as he would not be able to repay it. Laurent and C.P. believe she is making it personal, so the account is reassigned to Anthony.

Anthony insists on reviewing Laurent's financials and Nicole begrudgingly helps. Working on the figures the rest of the day and into the night, the pair bring their findings into work in the morning. Their evaluation of his financials, coupled with information Anthony's NYC contacts gleaned about US banks Leclair had caused to go under, convince C.P. to sever ties with him.

C.P. apologizes to Nicole for doubting her, then lets her know Anthony has turned in his notice. Saddenened, she heads home to find Anthony and they joyfully embrace.

== Cast ==
- Martin Sheen as Anthony Wayne
- Jacqueline Bisset as Nicole Chantrelle
- Victoria Shalet as Marie
- Jean-Pierre Cassel as C. P. Olivier
- James Faulkner as Laurent Leclair
- Isabelle Guiard as Nicole's secretary
- Dominic Gould as Pierre Meyer
