= Matilda (1996 film) =

1996 film directed by Danny DeVito

- Theatrical release poster
- Directed by: Danny DeVito
- Screenplay by: Nicholas Kazan; Robin Swicord
- Based on: Matilda by Roald Dahl
- Produced by: Danny DeVito; Michael Shamberg; Stacey Sher; Felicity Dahl
- Starring: Danny DeVito; Rhea Perlman; Embeth Davidtz; Pam Ferris; Mara Wilson
- Cinematography: Stefan Czapsky
- Edited by: Lynzee Klingman; Brent White
- Music by: David Newman
- Production companies: TriStar Pictures; Jersey Films
- Distributed by: Sony Pictures Releasing
- Release date: August 2, 1996 (United States)
- Running time: 98 minutes
- Country: United States
- Language: English
- Budget: $36 million
- Box office: $47 million

Matilda is a 1996 American fantasy comedy film based on Roald Dahl's 1988 novel Matilda and starring Mara Wilson as Matilda Wormwood. It is co-produced and directed by Danny DeVito from a screenplay by Nicholas Kazan and Robin Swicord. The film also features DeVito, Rhea Perlman, Embeth Davidtz, and Pam Ferris in supporting roles. Its plot centers on the titular child prodigy who develops psychokinetic abilities and uses them to deal with her abusive family and the tyrannical principal of her school.

Matilda was released in the United States on August 2, 1996, by Sony Pictures Releasing under their TriStar Pictures label. The film received positive reviews from critics and grossed $47 million on a $36 million budget. Matilda subsequently attained greater popularity after being released on home video.

== Plot ==
Matilda Wormwood is neglected and mistreated by her parents, Harry and Zinnia and her older brother, Michael. Since birth, she has been smart and independent and is often left home alone while Harry is at work, Zinnia is playing bingo, and Michael is at school. To pass the time, Matilda finds solace in books at the public library.

At age six and a half, Matilda begins to lose patience with her parents and when they refuse to acknowledge her smartness or enroll her in school, she finds ways to punish them, first by adding hydrogen peroxide to Harry's hair tonic and then gluing his hat to his head after discovering his ways of selling faulty cars at his used lot. After Harry destroys one of Matilda's library books and forces her to watch mindless television, Matilda becomes angry, and the television explodes.

The next day, Harry sells a car to the tyrannical principal of Crunchem Hall Elementary School, Agatha Trunchbull, in exchange for admitting Matilda as a student. On her first day, fellow students Lavender and Hortensia warn Matilda about Trunchbull's abusive disciplinary methods, which include throwing students out of the window and locking them in an iron maiden known as the Chokey. However, Matilda's teacher, Miss Jennifer Honey, notices the ease with which Matilda answers middle school multiplication questions and requests Matilda be moved to a higher class, but Trunchbull refuses; the Wormwoods are not interested either.

The next day, Trunchbull calls the school to the assembly hall where she forces student Bruce Bogtrotter to eat an enormous chocolate cake in one sitting provided by the school cook Cookie as punishment for stealing a slice of hers. Matilda and the school lead Bruce to success and Trunchbull gives them 5 hours detention. That night when she gets home, Matilda discovers Harry is under surveillance by the FBI over his illegal dealings such as purchasing stolen car parts but her parents refuse to believe her warning, as Zinnia flirts with the two agents who pose as speedboat salesmen.

Discovering the car from Harry to be faulty, Trunchbull locks Matilda in the Chokey as punishment. Miss Honey rescues Matilda, and Lavender puts a newt in Miss Trunchbull's water jug. Trunchbull accuses Matilda, who angrily telekinetically tips the glass over, splashing the newt onto Trunchbull. Matilda privately confesses to Miss Honey that she tipped the glass, but is unable to demonstrate her powers. Miss Honey invites Matilda to tea and reveals her past: her mother died when she was two, and her father Magnus invited his wife's stepsister, Trunchbull, to live with them and look after her, but Trunchbull abused her. Magnus died, apparently by suicide, when Miss Honey was five and left everything to Trunchbull in his will. Matilda and Miss Honey sneak into Trunchbull's house to retrieve some of Miss Honey's belongings including a special doll from her childhood, Liccy Doll, but Trunchbull unexpectedly returns after further car trouble, and they narrowly escape, with Miss Honey warning Matilda not to go back inside Trunchbull's house again.

Matilda practices her telekinetic powers and drives away the FBI agents in order for Harry to have time to come to his senses. That night, she returns to Trunchbull's house and climbs onto the roof, where she manages to use her powers to retrieve Liccy Doll and wreaks havoc while posing as the vengeful spirit of Magnus. She nearly succeeds and almost scares Trunchbull out but she uncovers Matilda's ruse upon finding her hair ribbon. The next day, Matilda gifts Liccy Doll to Miss Honey, and reveals her mastery of her powers, but Trunchbull visits the class and demands that Matilda confess while threatening to lock her away permanently. Matilda, again posing as Magnus' ghost, telekinetically writes a message on the blackboard. The message accuses Trunchbull of murdering him and demands that she return Miss Honey's house and money and leave town, threatening to murder her as retribution if she does not do so. Trunchbull becomes terrified and attacks the students in a rage, but Matilda protects them and they force Trunchbull out for good.

Miss Honey moves back into her father's house with Matilda as a frequent visitor. On one visit, Harry, Zinnia, and Michael come to take Matilda and flee to Guam to avoid the FBI. Matilda refuses to go, saying she would rather stay with Miss Honey. After Zinnia expresses remorse at never having understood her own daughter, she and Harry sign the adoption papers that Matilda obtained from the library. Matilda goes on to live happily with Miss Honey, who becomes principal of Crunchem Hall, which also gets an upper school added due to the students not wanting to leave.

== Cast ==
- Mara Wilson as Matilda Wormwood, a 6-year-old girl with special powers
  - Alissa and Amanda Graham and Trevor and James Gallagher as Newborn Matilda Wormwood
  - Kayla and Kelsey Fredericks as 9-month-old Matilda Wormwood
  - Amanda and Caitlin Fein as Toddler Matilda Wormwood
  - Sara Magdalin as 4-year-old Matilda Wormwood
- Embeth Davidtz as Jennifer Honey, the kind and polite teacher who inspires Matilda
  - Amanda and Kristyn Summers as 2-year-old Jennifer Honey
  - Phoebe Pearl as 5-year-old Jennifer Honey
- Danny DeVito as Harry Wormwood, Matilda's car salesman father
  - DeVito also narrates the film
- Rhea Perlman as Zinnia Wormwood, Matilda's bingo-obsessed mother
- Pam Ferris as Agatha Trunchbull, the abusive, ruthless and tyrannical principal of Crunchem Hall Elementary School, Miss Honey's step-aunt, and Matilda's nemesis
- Brian Levinson as Michael Wormwood, Matilda's obnoxious and rude older brother, who enjoys insulting her by calling her 'dipface'.
  - Nicholas Cox as 6-year-old Michael Wormwood
- Paul Reubens and Tracey Walter as Bob and Bill, two FBI agents investigating Harry's illegal car business.
- Kiami Davael as Lavender, Matilda's best friend at Crunchem Hall Elementary School
- Jacqueline Steiger as Amanda Thripp, Matilda's timid classmate at Crunchem Hall Elementary School
- Jimmy Karz as Bruce Bogtrotter, Matilda's heavy set schoolmate at Crunchem Hall Elementary School
- Kira Spencer-Hesser as Hortensia, a schoolmate at Crunchem Hall Elementary School
- Jean Speegle Howard as Mrs. Phelps, the librarian
- Marion Dugan as Cookie, the unsanitary school cook at Crunchem Hall Elementary school
- Jon Lovitz as Mickey (uncredited), the game show host of "The Million Dollar Sticky"

== Production ==
In November 1993, Universal Pictures won a screen adaptation of Matilda by Roald Dahl, written by writers Nicholas Kazan and Robin Swicord, following a heated bidding war between Universal and Columbia Pictures. Following disagreements between Danny DeVito and Bregman-Baer Productions over budgetary concerns, Universal put Matilda into turnaround, with Columbia's sister company TriStar Pictures picking up the project.

Miriam Margolyes confirmed that she auditioned for the role of Agatha Trunchbull during a filmed interview with Jo Brand for the UK television special, Roald Dahl's Revolting Rule Book, which was hosted by Richard E. Grant and aired on September 22, 2007. This documentary commemorated Dahl's 90th birthday and also celebrated his impact as a children's author in popular culture. Margolyes went on to play Aunt Sponge (another Dahl villainess) as well as the voice of the Glowworm in James and the Giant Peach, also released in 1996.

DeVito and cinematographer Stefan Czapsky made heavy use of wide-angle lenses and exaggerated perspective, in a manner similar to the films of Terry Gilliam. Pam Ferris (Miss Trunchbull) incurred several injuries during the production of the film. The climactic scene where she is whacked by blackboard erasers required her to keep her eyes open, causing chalk dust to get caught in her eyes and necessitating several trips to the hospital to get her eyes washed out. The scene where Trunchbull whirls Amanda Thripp (Jacqueline Steiger) by her pigtails required a harness to support the little girl, the wires of which were threaded through the pigtails and then looped around Ferris's fingertips to give her grip. As she swung her around, the centrifugal force grew too great and tore the top part of Ferris's finger, requiring seven or eight stitches.

The Crank House, in Altadena, stood in for Miss Trunchbull's house. The exterior of Matilda's house is located on Youngwood Drive in Whittier, while the library she visits is the Pasadena Public Library on East Walnut Street in Pasadena. The picture of Miss Honey's father, Magnus, is a portrait of Roald Dahl, the author of the book Matilda.

Suzie Wilson, Mara Wilson's mother, was diagnosed with breast cancer in March 1995 during filming, and later died on April 27, 1996, four months before the film's release. The film was dedicated to her memory. DeVito revealed that, prior to her death, he had shown her the final edit of the film so that she was able to see Mara's performance.

== Music ==
Two songs are featured in the film. One of them, "Send Me on My Way" by Rusted Root, is played twice: when four-year-old Matilda is left alone at her house, making pancakes, and at the end of the film, set to a montage of Matilda and Miss Honey playing at Miss Trunchbull's former house. The other song is Thurston Harris's "Little Bitty Pretty One", played when Matilda is dancing in the living room while using her telekinetic powers. The film's original score was composed by David Newman, a frequent collaborator of DeVito.

== Release ==
=== Box office ===
Matilda was released on August 2, 1996. It made $8.5 million at the US box office in its opening weekend, ranking in third place behind A Time to Kill and Independence Day. The film grossed $33.5 million in the United States and Canada and $47 million worldwide against a production budget of $36 million.

=== Home media ===
The film was released on VHS in pan and scan and LaserDisc in widescreen on December 17, 1996, from Columbia TriStar Home Video. On June 2, 1997, it was released on a bare-bones dual-sided DVD containing fullscreen and widescreen. Another DVD rendition with more special features including behind-the-scenes feturettes, games, and a read-along was released on June 7, 2005. In 2012, Danny DeVito hosted a Matilda reunion, where some of the cast reenacted scenes from the film. With the 2023 release of the film on Blu-ray in 2013, footage from the reunion was included as an extra. In September 2023, a 4K restoration of the film was released on 4K Ultra HD Blu-ray, which included a Dolby Vision master, HDR10 grades, and a Dolby Atmos audio mix.

== Reception ==
Matilda received generally positive reviews from critics. On Rotten Tomatoes, Matilda has an approval rating of 90% based on 105 reviews, with an average rating of 7.4/10. The website's critical consensus reads: "The Danny DeVito-directed version of Matilda is odd, charming, and while the movie diverges from Roald Dahl, it nonetheless captures the book's spirit". On Metacritic, the film has a score of 72 out of 100 based on reviews from 21 critics, indicating "generally favorable reviews". Audiences surveyed by CinemaScore gave the film a grade "B+" on a scale of A to F. Writing for Empire, Caroline Westbrook gave the film a rating of three stars and praised DeVito's direction.

Roger Ebert of the Chicago Sun-Times praised the film's oddity, gave it three stars out of four, and wrote:

Trunchbull is the kind of villainess children can enjoy because she is too ridiculous to be taken seriously and yet is mean and evil, like the witch in Snow White. And since most children have, at one time or another, felt that their parents are not nice enough to them, they may also enjoy the portrait of Matilda's parents.

== See also ==
- Puerto Papel
- Matilda the Musical – 2022 film by Matthew Warchus
- Danny Phantom
