= Hardwicke House =

British TV sitcom (1987)

- Genre: Sitcom
- Created by: Paula Burdon
- Written by: Richard Hall; Simon Wright
- Directed by: John Stroud
- Starring: Roy Kinnear; Pam Ferris; Duncan Preston
- Theme music composer: Peter Brewis
- Country of origin: United Kingdom
- Original language: English
- No. of series: 1
- No. of episodes: 2 (+ five untransmitted)

Production
- Producer: Paula Burdon
- Running time: 50 minutes (Episode 1); 25 minutes (Episodes 2–7)
- Production company: Central Independent Television

Original release
- Network: ITV
- Release: 24 February – 25 February 1987

Hardwicke House is a seven-episode sitcom produced by Central Independent Television for the ITV network. It was originally produced in the summer of 1986. It was so negatively received that only the first two episodes were transmitted.

== Plot and episode titles ==
The series is set in the large comprehensive school of the title, the staff of which are as dysfunctional as the pupils. One teacher is a multiple murderer while the deputy headmaster lusts after male pupils. One teacher, Moose Magnusson, is on an extended exchange placement because his own school in Iceland refuses to have him back.

- Episode 1 – "The Visit" (24 February 1987)
- Episode 2 – "The First Day of Term" (25 February 1987)
- Episode 3 – "Interview Day" (scheduled for 4 March 1987)
- Episode 4 – "Prize Giving" (scheduled for 11 March 1987)
- Episode 5 – "Old Boys" (scheduled for 18 March 1987)
- Episode 6 – "An Inspector Calls" (scheduled for 25 March 1987)
- Episode 7 – "Passion Play" (scheduled for 1 April 1987)

== Cast ==
- Roy Kinnear as Mr Wickham, the headmaster
- Pam Ferris as Miss Crabbe, French teacher
- Tony Haygarth as Mr Savage, PE teacher
- Duncan Preston as Mr Moose Magnusson, Maths teacher
- Gavin Richards as Mr Flashman, History teacher
- Granville Saxton as Mr Fowl
- Roger Sloman as Mr Mackintosh, deputy head
- Nick Wilton as Mr Peter Philpott, trainee teacher
- Kevin Allen as Slasher Bates
- Pui Fan Lee as Angela
- Faye Maguire as Beverly
- Micky O'Donoghue as Ernie, head of maintenance
- Paul Spurrier as Spotty
- Paul Darlow as John
- Liz Fraser as Agnes, school secretary
