= Matilda the Musical (film) =

2022 film by Matthew Warchus

Roald Dahl's Matilda the Musical
- Theatrical release poster
- Directed by: Matthew Warchus
- Screenplay by: Dennis Kelly
- Based on: Matilda the Musical by Tim Minchin and Dennis Kelly; Matilda by Roald Dahl
- Produced by: Tim Bevan; Eric Fellner; Jon Finn; Luke Kelly
- Starring: Alisha Weir; Lashana Lynch; Stephen Graham; Andrea Riseborough; Sindhu Vee; Emma Thompson
- Cinematography: Tat Radcliffe
- Edited by: Melanie Ann Oliver
- Music by: Tim Minchin (songs); Christopher Nightingale (score)
- Production companies: TriStar Pictures; Working Title Films; The Roald Dahl Story Company
- Distributed by: Sony Pictures Releasing International (United Kingdom); Netflix (International)
- Release dates: 5 October 2022 (BFI); 25 November 2022 (United Kingdom); 9 December 2022 (United States)
- Running time: 118 minutes
- Countries: United Kingdom; United States
- Language: English
- Budget: $25 million
- Box office: $37.3 million

Roald Dahl's Matilda the Musical, or simply Matilda the Musical, is a 2022 musical fantasy comedy film directed by Matthew Warchus and written by Dennis Kelly. It is based on the stage musical by Tim Minchin and Kelly, which in turn was based on Matilda by Roald Dahl. The second film adaptation of the novel, after Matilda (1996), it stars Alisha Weir as the title character, with Lashana Lynch, Stephen Graham, Andrea Riseborough, Sindhu Vee, and Emma Thompson. In the plot, Matilda Wormwood (Weir), neglected and mistreated by her parents (Graham and Riseborough), develops psychokinetic abilities to deal with the injustices of life, as well as Miss Trunchbull (Thompson), the ruthless and cruel headmistress of Crunchem Hall School.

An adaptation of the stage musical was first announced in November 2013, with Warchus and Kelly reportedly attached to return as director and writer, respectively. In January 2020, the project was officially announced, and Warchus and Kelly's returns were confirmed, as well as Minchin, who revealed he was returning to write new songs for the film. Christopher Nightingale, who had written background music for the stage production, was also hired to return as composer of the film's incidental score. The cast was filled out between January and April 2021, including Weir, Lynch, Thompson, Vee, Graham, and Riseborough. Filming took place beginning in May 2021.

Roald Dahl's Matilda the Musical premiered at the 66th BFI London Film Festival on 5 October 2022, and was theatrically released in the United Kingdom on 25 November, by Sony Pictures Releasing, while in the United States it received a limited theatrical release on 9 December and was available on Netflix on 25 December. The film received positive reviews from critics, and was nominated for Outstanding British Film and Best Makeup and Hair at the 76th British Academy Film Awards.

== Plot ==
In a hospital, Mrs. Wormwood gives birth to Matilda, although her father expresses dismay that she is not a boy. Matilda grows into a sweet child who loves reading, despite the neglect of her parents. The authorities discover that Matilda has not been properly schooled, and teacher Miss Jennifer Honey suggests Matilda be sent to Crunchem Hall. Angry about being fined for not sending his daughter to school, Mr. Wormwood tells Crunchem Hall’s tyrannical headmistress, Miss Agatha Trunchbull, that Matilda is a horrible child. In retaliation, Matilda mixes green hair dye into his hair tonic.

Arriving at school, Matilda and fellow new student Lavender are warned about the terrible way the students are treated. In Miss Honey's classroom, Matilda solves a complex mathematical equation on the board left there from a class for adults. An impressed Miss Honey asks Trunchbull to move Matilda to a class with older children, but Trunchbull refuses to let Matilda be an exception to the rules. At home, when Matilda criticises her father, he rips her library book apart; the next day, she retaliates by putting glue in his hat.

The children explain Trunchbull's preferred method of punishment to be the Chokey, a spiked cupboard. During lunch, Trunchbull accuses Matilda of stealing a slice of her chocolate cake, but Bruce Bogtrotter accidentally reveals he is the culprit by belching. Trunchbull forces Bruce to eat the entire cake, saying he will be forgiven if he eats it all. Bruce succeeds, but Trunchbull goes against her word and takes him to Chokey anyways. Afterwards, Matilda's classmates sing about their hopes for the future.

After school, Matilda tells a story to Mrs. Phelps about a pregnant acrobat and escapologist who are forced to perform a dangerous stunt by the acrobat's stepsister; she is horribly injured and dies after giving birth to a daughter. The escapologist doesn't blame the stepsister and asks her to help him raise his daughter, but she is cruel to the girl. When the escapologist discovers his daughter locked in the cellar, he comforts her before leaving to confront the stepsister, but never returns.

The next day, Trunchbull forces the children through challenging exercises to crush their rebelliousness. Lavender slips her pet newt, Isaac, into Trunchbull's drinking water, causing her distress. Right before Trunchbull punishes another student, Matilda stands up to her and tells her to stop. This enrages Trunchbull and causes her to shout at Matilda, who then uses her newly-discovered telekinesis to hurl a cup at Trunchbull's head. Trunchbull, frightened by Isaac, runs away.

Afterwards, Miss Honey invites Matilda to her cottage, where Matilda learns that the story she had been telling Mrs. Phelps that she had thought she made up was actually the true story of Miss Honey's life and the escapologist and the acrobat were Miss Honey's parents, and the evil stepsister is Trunchbull. Outraged, Matilda goes to the Chokey and uses her telekinesis to destroy it. At home, Matilda learns that her father has cheated the local Mafia and that her family will be fleeing to Spain.

When the children return to school, Trunchbull forces Miss Honey's class to spell words correctly or be punished in a rebuilt Chokey. She has Lavender spell a made-up word, prompting the other children to purposely misspell words in rebellion. Trunchbull then reveals that she built a multitude of new Chokeys for every last child to be put in. Matilda uses her telekinesis to write on a blackboard pretending to be the ghost of the escapologist. She tells her to give Miss Honey back her house or else. When Trunchbull refuses, Matilda throws her out of the school with her telekenesis. Miss Honey tells Trunchbull never to return to the school and takes back the keys to her father's house, as well as the keys to the school. After Trunchbull runs away, the students celebrate their freedom from Trunchbull's rule by destroying Trunchbull's statue and Lavender reclaims Isaac from Miss Trunchbull's office.

Mr. and Mrs. Wormwood arrive to take Matilda to Spain with them, but Miss Honey offers to take care of Matilda which the Wormwoods allow and Matilda happily accepts. With Miss Honey as the new headmistress, the school is renovated and improved, much to the delight of the students while Miss Honey and Matilda appreciate each other's help.

== Cast ==
- Alisha Weir as Matilda Wormwood
- Emma Thompson as Miss Agatha Trunchbull
- Lashana Lynch as Miss Jenny Honey
  - Amber Adeyinka as young Miss Honey
- Stephen Graham as Mr Wormwood
- Andrea Riseborough as Mrs Wormwood
- Sindhu Vee as Mrs Phelps
- Carl Spencer as Magnus the Escapologist
- Lauren Alexandra as The Acrobat
- Winter Jarrett-Glasspool as Amanda Thripp
- Andrei Shen as Eric
- Ashton Robertson as Nigel
- Meesha Garbett as Hortensia
- Charlie Hodson-Prior as Bruce Bogtrotter
- Rei Yamauchi Fulker as Lavender
- Katherine Kingsley as The Acrobat's stepsister
- Matt Henry as The Doctor

== Production ==
=== Development ===
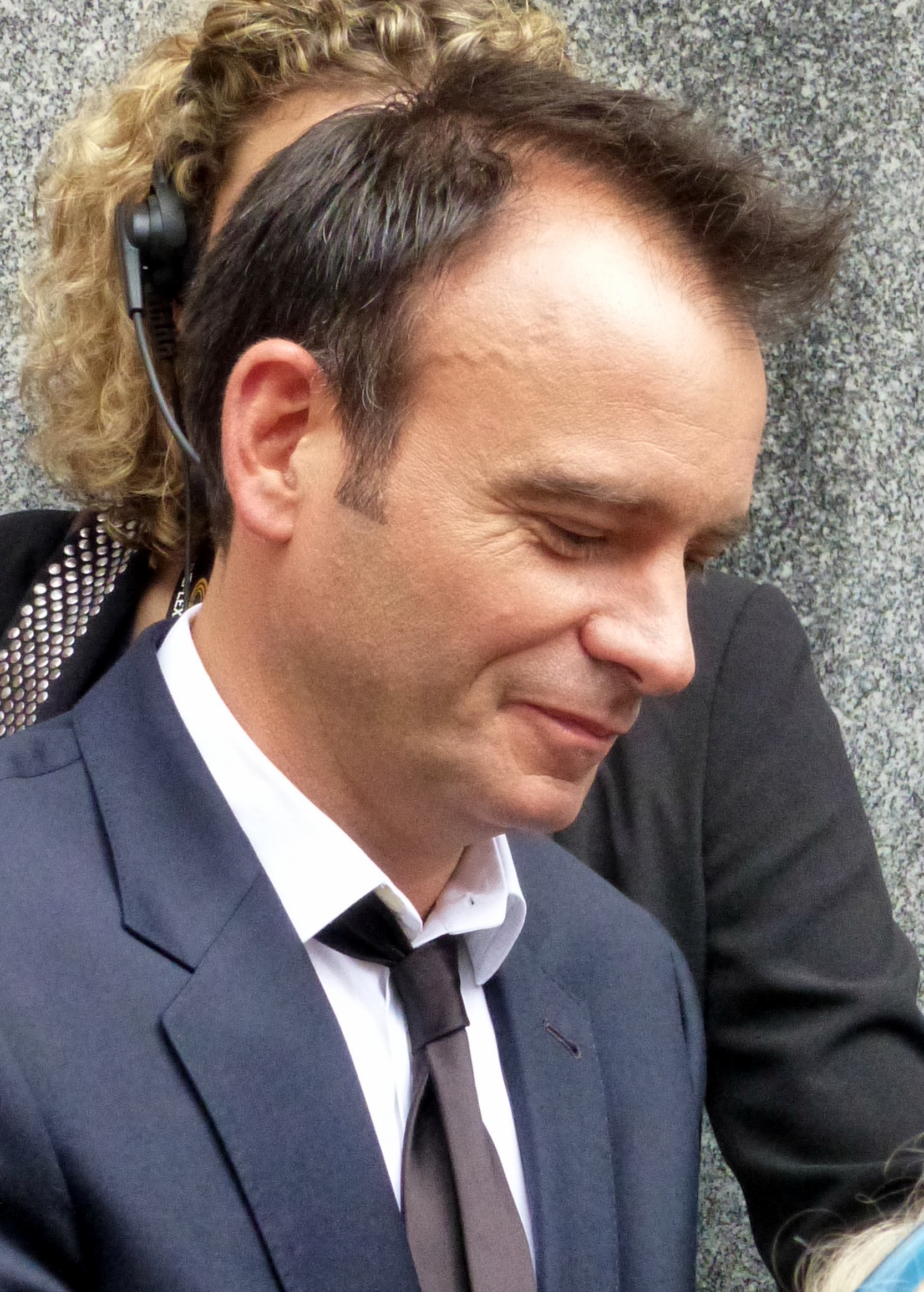
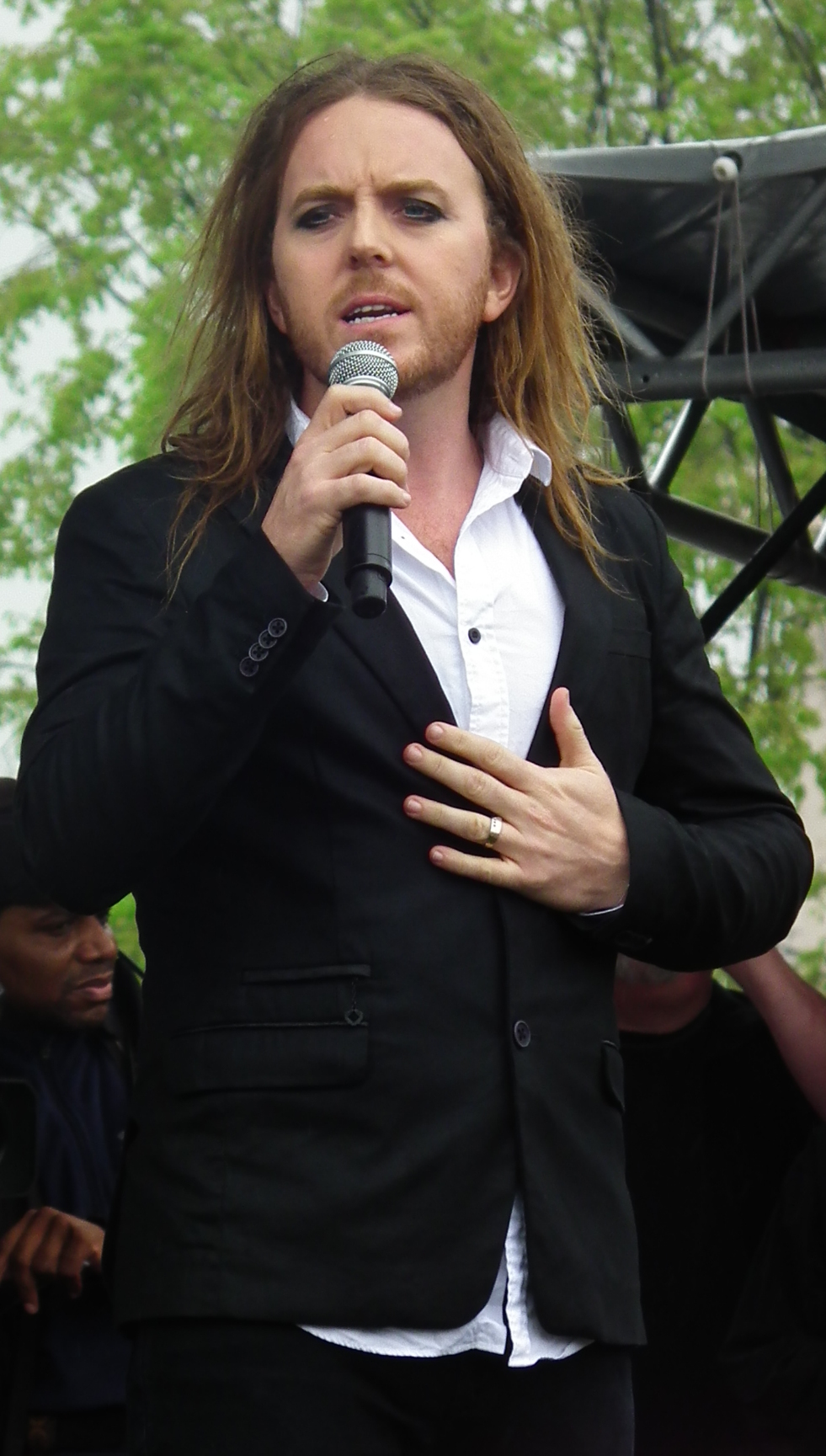
Director Matthew Warchus (left) and songwriter Tim Minchin

On 15 November 2013, it was reported that Matthew Warchus and Dennis Kelly, director and writer, respectively, for the musical Matilda the Musical, based on Roald Dahl's novel Matilda, would return for a film adaptation. In June 2016, Tim Minchin confirmed that a film adaptation of Matilda the Musical was in development, which he said "will probably be made in the next 4 or 5 years". Mara Wilson, who previously starred in the 1996 film adaptation of the novel directed by Danny DeVito, said, "Maybe if they made it into a movie, I could have a cameo, but that's for them to decide."

On 27 November 2018, Netflix was revealed to be adapting Matilda as an animated series, which would be part of an "animated event series" along with other Roald Dahl books such as The BFG, The Twits, and Charlie and the Chocolate Factory. In November 2019, DeVito said that he "always wanted to" develop a sequel to Matilda, adding that a potential sequel could star Matilda's own child, due to Wilson having aged in the time since. On 28 January 2020, it was reported that Working Title Films would produce, while Netflix would distribute via streaming, and Sony Pictures Releasing, who previously distributed the 1996 film through its TriStar Pictures banner, would handle theatrical and home video exclusively in the UK through the same banner. It was also confirmed that Warchus and Kelly were still involved with the project. Ellen Kane, who worked with choreographer Peter Darling on the stage production, choreographed the film.

=== Casting ===
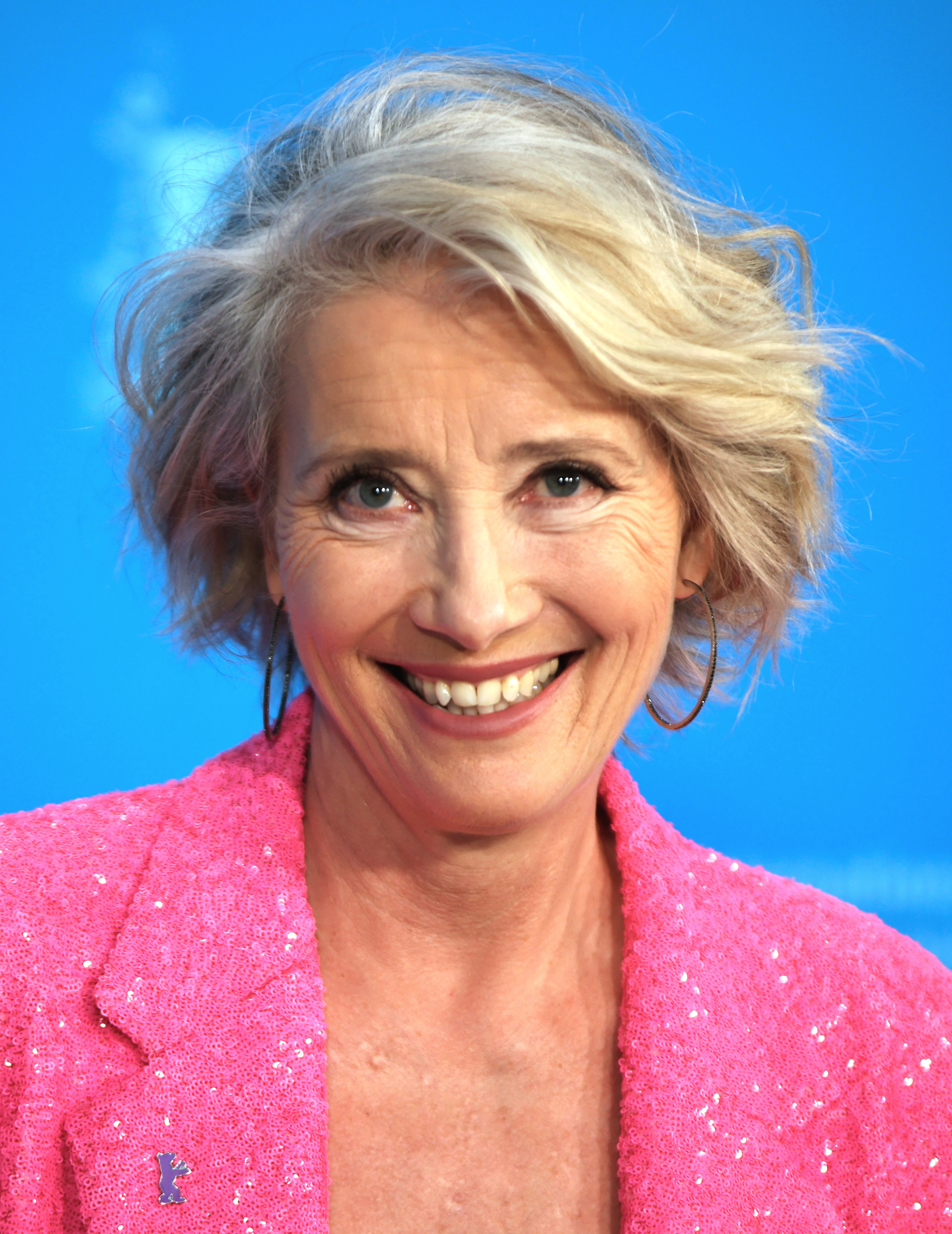
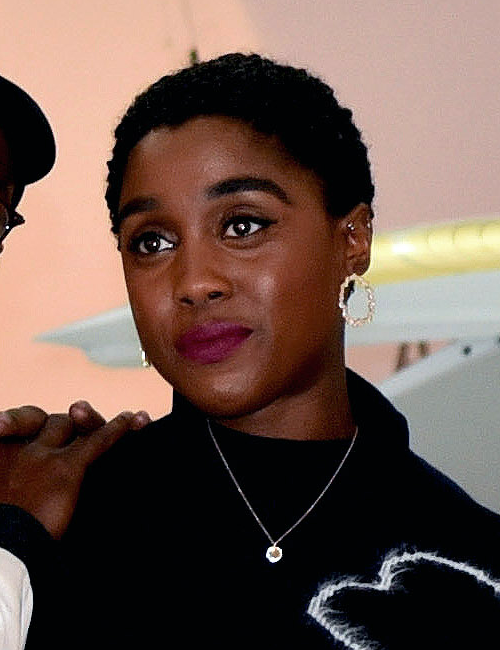
Emma Thompson (left) and Lashana Lynch play Miss Trunchbull and Miss Honey respectively.

On 4 May 2020, it was reported that Ralph Fiennes was cast as Miss Trunchbull (the role has conventionally been portrayed on stage by male actors). However, later on 14 January 2021, it was announced that Emma Thompson would play the character instead, with additional confirmations that Lashana Lynch was cast as Miss Honey and Alisha Weir was cast in the title role, after giving what Warchus called "an unforgettable audition." Over 200 children were cast as the rest of the student body of Crunchem Hall. In April 2021 it was announced that Stephen Graham, Andrea Riseborough and Sindhu Vee would be joining the cast as Mr Wormwood, Mrs Wormwood and Mrs Phelps, respectively.

=== Filming ===
Production was originally planned between August and December 2020, however, this was postponed to spring 2021 due to the COVID-19 pandemic. Filming primarily took place at Shepperton Studios in Surrey, with locations including Bramshill House, a Grade I-listed Jacobean manor in Hampshire for Crunchem Hall; and Denham, Buckinghamshire for scenes set in Matilda's home village. Some production is also listed as having taken place in Ireland.

== Music ==
On 15 November 2013, Minchin, who previously wrote songs for the musical, was in talks to create new songs for the film, and in 2020, he was confirmed to do so. Christopher Nightingale composed original incidental music to underscore the film, just as he did onstage.

The film's soundtrack album, containing both the songs and Nightingale's score, was released worldwide on 18 November 2022 digitally and 9 December 2022 on physical CD, by Milan Records.

=== Musical numbers ===
- "Miracle" – Doctor, Mrs Wormwood, Mr Wormwood, Matilda and Company
- "Naughty" – Matilda
- "School Song" – Hortensia, Prefects and Children
- "The Hammer" – Miss Trunchbull, Children and Miss Honey
- "Naughty" (reprise) – Matilda
- "Chokey Chant" – Children
- "Bruce" – Children
- "When I Grow Up" – Children, Miss Honey and Matilda
- "I'm Here" – Matilda and The Escapologist
- "The Smell of Rebellion" – Miss Trunchbull
- "Quiet" – Matilda
- "My House" – Miss Honey and The Escapologist
- "Revolting Children" – Bruce, Hortensia and Children
- "Still Holding My Hand" – Miss Honey, Matilda, Children and Company

== Release ==
Matilda the Musical had its world premiere at the 66th BFI London Film Festival on 5 October 2022, and was released in the United Kingdom by Sony Pictures Releasing International, on 25 November 2022. The film received a limited theatrical release in the United States and internationally on 9 December 2022, before streaming on Netflix on Christmas Day 2022. The United Kingdom had overseen home media releases on Sony Pictures and Netflix and started streaming on June 25, 2023.

A sing-along edition opened across United Kingdom cinemas for a limited time starting on New Year's Day 2023; a preview screening was shown on 17 December 2022, in aid of MediCinema. This version began in the United States on 6 January 2023.

=== Television broadcast ===
Matilda the Musical had its UK television premiere on BBC One and BBC iPlayer on Boxing Day 2024, two days after its removal from Netflix in the country.

== Reception ==
=== Box office ===
In its opening weekend, 25 November 2022, Matilda topped the UK box office with a gross of $5,000,505, beating the previous two weeks' holder Black Panther: Wakanda Forever.

Matilda remained at the top of the UK box office for three consecutive weeks, until Avatar: The Way of Water. As of 9 April 2023, it grossed $34,749,194 in the United Kingdom.

In 2022, Matilda was the fourth highest-grossing family film in the United Kingdom, earning $22.7 million, behind Minions: The Rise of Gru ($56 million), Sing 2 ($44.1 million) and Sonic the Hedgehog 2 ($34.7 million).

=== Audience viewership ===
Between its release and June 2023, according to Netflix, the film totaled 81 million hours watched.

=== Critical reception ===
On the review aggregator website Rotten Tomatoes, 93% of 96 critics' reviews are positive, with an average rating of 7.7/10. The website's consensus reads: "Roald Dahl's Matilda the Musical brings the classic story back to the screen with a delightful Emma Thompson, dazzling dancing, and a suitably irascible take on the source material." Vanity Fair discussed Ellen Kane's choreography for "Revolting Children", including the use of parkour-inspired movement and a large child ensemble in the sequence. Metacritic assigned the film a weighted average score of 72 out of 100 based on 28 critics, indicating "generally favorable reviews".

Robbie Collin of The Telegraph wrote Thompson's portrayal of Trunchbull is "a deranged villain to remember". The Guardian critic Peter Bradshaw stated "the gleefully sly comedy kindred spirits of Thompson and Minchin come together to form the film's bedrock of naughtiness". Matt Patches of Polygon named the "Revolting Children" sequence as one of the best movie scenes of the year. Avinash Ramachandran of Cinema Express called it a "fantastical reboot of a beloved classic."
