= Lauren Mote =

British actress (born 1997)

- Born: 10 February 1997 (age 29); Sunderland, Tyne and Wear, England
- Other name: Lauren Moat
- Years active: 2008–present

Lauren Mote (born 10 February 1997) is a British voice actress. She voiced Lizzy in the Disney CGI-animated film Tinker Bell and the Great Fairy Rescue (2010). In her teens, she switched to a focus on voicing characters in video games, and has also appeared in various BBC Radio 4 drama productions, as well as some live-acting television and stage performances.

== Early life ==
Mote was born in Sunderland on 10 February 1997. She trained at her local Stagecoach Theatre Arts School from the age of five. Mote and her family moved to London in 2007, after she was accepted into the Sylvia Young Theatre School.

== Career ==
Mote won the leading role of Lizzy in Tinker Bell and the Great Fairy Rescue, part of an CGI-animated Disney series featuring Tinker Bell the fairy from Peter Pan, following an open audition in 2008.

Other work completed by Mote includes the 2009 BBC Radio 4 serial of Matilda, based on the novel by Roald Dahl, in which she voiced the leading role of five-year-old Matilda. She also starred in the BBC Radio 4 Afternoon Play Highgate Letters, broadcast in April 2010, and performed in the musical Oliver! at the Theatre Royal, Drury Lane, in London's West End, in 2008 and 2009. In 2011, Mote took the lead role of Harmony Parker in the BBC Radio 4 Extra dramatisation of The Queen's Nose and the lead role of Alice in the BBC Radio 4 adaptation of Alice Through the Looking Glass. She portrayed the role of Lizanne in the first two episodes of the third series of Tracy Beaker Returns.

Mote voiced the characters of Esther and Myrtle in the 2013 English Language release of Level 5 and Studio Ghibli's Ni no Kuni: Wrath of the White Witch.

== Filmography ==
| Year | Show | Role | Notes | Refs |
|---|---|---|---|---|
| 2008 | Fable II | Children (voice) | Video game | |
| 2010 | Fable III | Children (voice) | Video game | |
| 2010 | Tinker Bell and the Great Fairy Rescue | Lizzy Griffiths (voice) | DVD | |
| 2011 | Kinect Disneyland Adventures | (voice) | Video game | |
| 2011 | Ni no Kuni: Wrath of the White Witch | Esther / Myrtle (voice) | Video game | |
| 2012 | The Secret World | Nefertari the Younger / Emma Smith (voice) | Video game | |
| 2012 | Tracy Beaker Returns | Lizanne | Series 3, Episodes: The Visitors and Firestarter | |
| 2013 | Remember Me | (voice) | Video game | |
| 2013 | The Secret World | Emma Smith (voice) | Issue #7 - A Dream to Kill Video Game | |
| 2015–2016 | Dreamfall Chapters | The First, Abby, and various characters (voice) | Video game series, episodes 1–5 | |
| 2018 | Dragon Quest XI | Mia (voice) | | |
