= Haunted (1995 film) =

- Film poster
- Directed by: Lewis Gilbert
- Written by: Lewis Gilbert Bob Kellett Timothy Prager
- Based on: Haunted by James Herbert
- Produced by: Lewis Gilbert; Anthony Andrews; Ralph Kamp
- Starring: Aidan Quinn; Kate Beckinsale; Anthony Andrews; John Gielgud; Anna Massey
- Narrated by: Aidan Quinn
- Cinematography: Tony Pierce-Roberts
- Edited by: John Jympson
- Music by: Debbie Wiseman
- Production company: American Zoetrope
- Distributed by: Entertainment Film Distributors
- Release date: 1995
- Running time: 108 minutes
- Country: United Kingdom
- Language: English

Haunted is a 1995 horror film directed by Lewis Gilbert and starring Aidan Quinn, Kate Beckinsale, Anthony Andrews, Victoria Shalet and John Gielgud. It is based on a 1988 novel of the same name by James Herbert, but makes significant changes to the original story. The film was produced by Andrews and Gilbert.

== Plot ==
In 1928 England, English professor David Ash has spent most of his life working in the field of parapsychology to disprove the existence of ghosts. He is motivated by the death by drowning of Juliet, his twin sister, when they were 11, for which he blames himself because he couldn’t save her. After Juliet's death, David and his mother went to live in America.

David attends a séance, where he exposes the medium's tricks, revealing her hidden accomplices. He is then shocked to hear her call out his name in a voice that sounds like Juliet's.

As a professor at the (fictitious) University of Camberley he receives a series of urgent entreaties from a Miss Webb, who claims she is being tormented by ghosts, to come and help her. The name of the house is Edbrook.

David travels to Sussex and is picked up at the railway station by Christina Mariell. Christina reveals Miss Webb is in fact their Nanny Tess, and that she wrote to David at the urging of Christina and her two brothers, Robert and Simon. The siblings are concerned for their nanny's mental health and think her belief in ghosts is due to her senility. Christina drives David to the palatial Edbrook House, where he meets her brothers and the withdrawn Nanny Tess.

While touring Edbrook house David sees a partially nude painting of Christina hanging in the hallway. He then meets Robert in his studio working on a partially finished painting, again of a nude Christina. Robert explains he was the one to give Nanny Tess a copy of David's book and apologizes for potentially causing him to visit for nothing.

Later while walking the grounds, David encounters Christina near a dock on a pond. Christina strips naked in front of David and dives into the water but does not immediately surface, causing David to have a brief PTSD response, as he relives the death of his twin Juliet. Christina resurfaces just as her other brother, Simon, who has been sneaking up behind David jumps out at him and playfully introduces himself as the Joker of the three siblings. Simon then further surprises David by also stripping nude and jumping into the water. David seems both confused and fascinated by the two siblings who play in the water and chase one another as if they were children.

David begins to perform forensic examinations of the house, trying to detect evidence of paranormal activity. Nanny Tess seems terrified and confused, having episodes that suggest her health is failing. Also complicating the investigation is Christina's continuous flirtation with David, and his own infatuation with her. However, older brother Robert is against their friendship, and the two have a suspiciously close relationship. David begins having paranormal experiences. Christina, who had originally told David both her parents died in India, admits that in fact her mother drowned herself in the lake and Nanny Tess was the one who discovered the body. David believes that this trauma is causing Nanny Tess to see the ghost of Mrs. Mariell.

David then decides to leave Edbrook and asks Christina to come away with him. Although she refuses, they kiss and end up making love in her bed. In the morning, when David wakes, the wind is gusting through the house, which is now cloaked in black drapes and littered with fallen leaves. He searches for Christina but instead sees the ghost of Juliet, who leads David to a cemetery. Juliet calls his attention to a tombstone which states that Robert, Christina and Simon Mariell all died in a fire at Edbrook House in 1923.

A confused David seeks out Dr. Doyle, the family doctor, whom he had met earlier, only to be told by Juliet's ghost that Doyle also had died years ago. Despite Juliet's warning, David leaves with Christina, who has appeared in her car. On the drive home, he sees Juliet in the middle of the road and wrenches the wheel to avoid her. The car crashes into a tree and explodes, killing Christina. David escapes, returns to the house and confronts Nanny Tess. She confirms that the Mariell siblings are dead and that their ghosts will do anything to keep her and David from leaving. The reason Mrs. Mariell drowned herself was because she discovered drunken Simon and Robert having incestuous sex with Christina in their parents' bed. The siblings appear and force Nanny Tess to confess to their murder (she had locked them in a bedroom and then set fire to the house).

With David as the new victim of their torments, the siblings no longer need Nanny Tess. They kill her, and Christina asks David to die for them. He tries to escape but is blocked by the three siblings and Dr. Doyle. They set the mansion ablaze, but he escapes to the upstairs bedroom. While Robert, Simon and Christina cackle within the flames at his imminent death, Juliet appears and walks through the flames, takes David by the hand and rescues him. As they walk away from the mansion's ruins, Juliet absolves him of his guilt over her death and departs to the afterlife.

David returns home and is greeted by his assistant, Kate, as he steps off the train. Behind the unsuspecting couple, Christina moves out of the shadows and follows them through the stream from the train as they leave the platform.

== Production ==
Haunted was shot on location in Parham Park, West Sussex.

== Cast ==
- Aidan Quinn as Professor David Ash
- Peter England as Young David Ash
- Kate Beckinsale as Christina Mariell
- Anthony Andrews as Robert Mariell
- John Gielgud as Dr. Doyle
- Anna Massey as Nanny Tess Webb
- Alex Lowe as Simon Mariell
- Victoria Shalet as Young Juliet Ash
- Geraldine Somerville as Kate McCarrick
- Linda Bassett as Madam Brontski
- Liz Smith as Old Gypsy Woman
- Alice Douglas as Clare
- Edmund Moriarty as Liam
- Emily Hamilton as Mary
- Tom Lipscombe as School Boy

== Reception ==
The film received an 80% fresh rating from five critics on Rotten Tomatoes.
