= Victoria Shalet =

British actress

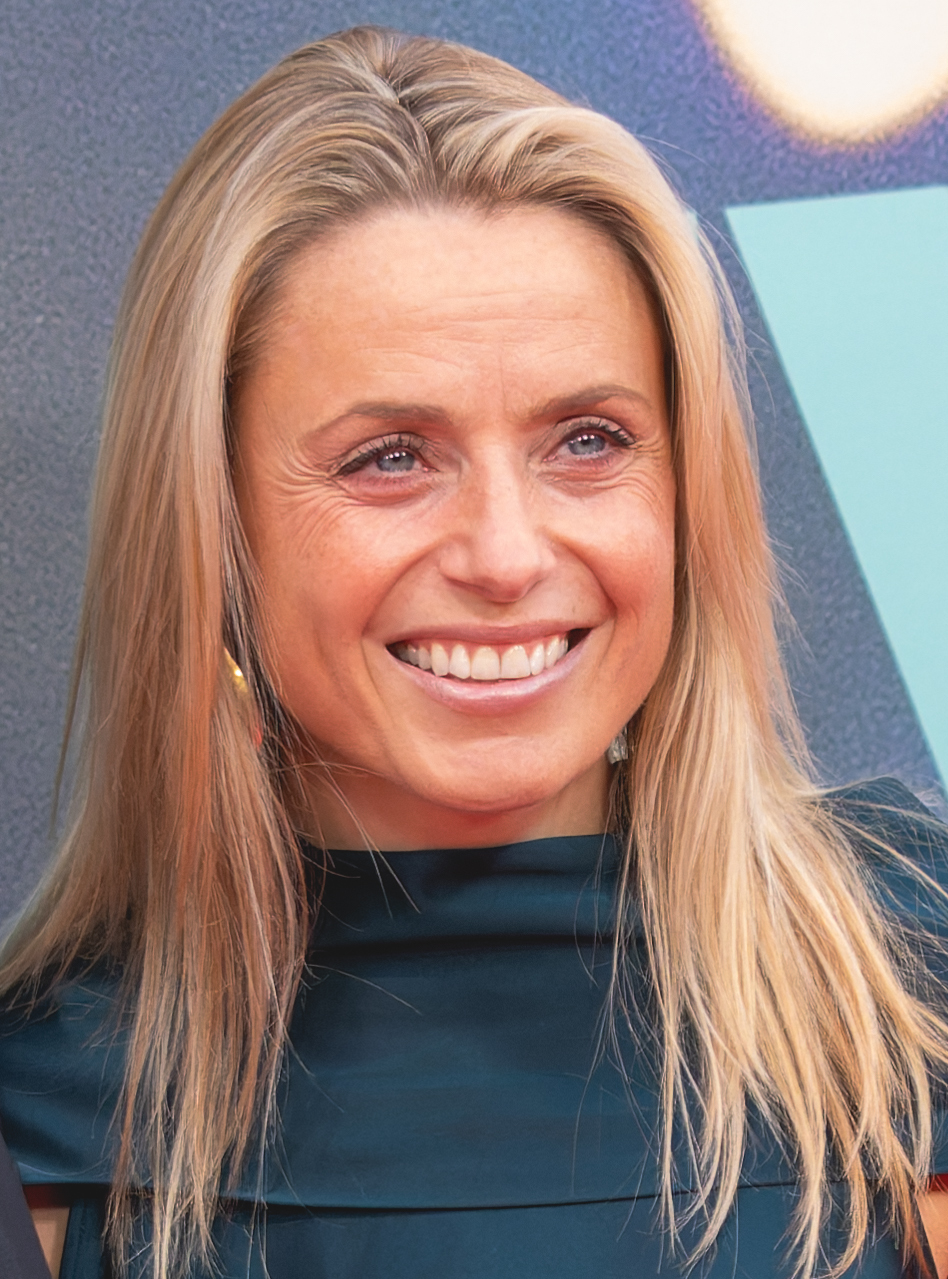
- Shalet in October 2024
- Born: 9 December 1981 (age 44); Enfield, England
- Occupations: Actor; psychotherapist; counsellor
- Years active: 1989–2012 (as actor)
- Spouse: Adam James (m. 2015)
- Children: 1

Victoria Shalet (born 9 December 1981) is an English former actor, known for her role as Harmony in the CBBC adaptation of the Dick King-Smith book The Queen's Nose.

== Acting ==
Victoria Jane Shalet was born in Enfield, Greater London, the only daughter of four children of Lawrence and Elaine Shalet. She is English on her mother's side and her father has Russian and Jewish heritage. She attended Southgate School. Shalet was sent to after-school acting, singing and dancing classes run by the local church, and the agent who ran the classes sent her for her first audition, for the BBC series Testimony of a Child. She won the role of Rosie Taylor and made her acting debut, the series airing in 1989.

She was next cast as Anna, the daughter of Miranda Richardson and Michael Kitchen's rowdy family, in Andrew Davies's Ball-Trap on the Cote Sauvage. In 1990 she attended an audition in America for Jim Henson, who cast her in Mother Goose Stories (where she appeared in two stories, Dorothy in The Giant and the title character in The Little Girl with the Curl). Shalet later played the daughter of King Minos in Henson production The Greek Myths.

By this time Shalet was finding work all over the world. In 1991 she guest starred in two episodes of ITV's Spatz and an episode of the Dutch series Van Der Valk. She played her largest role to date in the French film The Maid, playing the bratty daughter of Jacqueline Bisset. The following year she was cast in Shining Through alongside Michael Douglas, Melanie Griffith, John Gielgud and Liam Neeson (playing her father). That same year she acted in two BBC series, Love Hurts and Natural Lies. In 1993 she played a role in Goggle Eyes, an adaptation of Anne Fine's award-winning novel, and two years later appeared in the film Haunted.

In 1995 she was cast in the role she became best known for, the BBC children's series The Queen's Nose. In a podtail interview Shalet mentioned that Carol Wiseman (who directed the series) had previously worked with her on Goggle-Eyes and had wanted to work with the actress again, which led to Shalet being cast in The Queen's Nose. Shalet played the lead role of Harmony Parker, a lonely tomboy who is given a magic coin that grants wishes. The series quickly became a critical and popular success, winning a Royal Television Society Award and leading to Shalet appearing in various magazines and television interviews, including Blue Peter and Comic Relief. Shalet played the role for five years, juggling her filming commitments with her education (passing nine GCSEs), and eventually with other roles.

In 1997, after three years of playing Parker, she was cast in Andrew Davies' adaptation of his novel Getting Hurt, which aired the following year as part of BBC2's Obsessions season. The adult drama featured a scene of Nicholas Hope "photographically seducing her" which was described by the Times as one of the most powerful and chilling scenes in the drama. 1998 saw her make her stage debut, appearing in Philip Ridley's FairyTaleHeart at the Hampstead Theatre. She also acted in numerous radio dramas, including CS Lewis' The Last Battle in 1998 (as Jill Pole), Ballet Shoes (1999) (as Pauline Fossil), The River (2000) (as Valerie) and National Velvet (2001) (as Edwina Brown).

Shalet left The Queen's Nose in 2000, returning for two cameoes in 2001 and 2002 respectively. Her next role was in The Vice, her character ultimately becoming a significant character and being revealed as the daughter of Ken Stott's Inspector Pat Chappel. In a podtail interview she said that it was the role she had wanted the most in her adult career that she actually succeeded in getting. She had also auditioned for the roles in both Junk (1999) and As If (2001–2004), but lost out both times to the actress Jemima Rooper.

Over the next few years, she guest starred in The Bill, Doctors (in 2009), Midsomer Murders (in 2002 and 2009), Jonathan Creek and MIT: Murder Investigation Team, and appeared in the films The Affair of the Necklace, Eroica (in a non-speaking role) and in David Jason's semi autobiographical drama The Quest. Despite critical acclaim for her stage role in the 2005 Salisbury Playhouse production of My Mother Said I Never Should and a 2007 fringe theatre production of The Things Good Men Do, screen roles dried up, and Shalet worked primarily in voice-overs and TV commercials, also acting in several short films.

== Personal life ==
Shalet is the second cousin of the actress Kacey Barnfield.

She previously dated reporter and economist Conor Woodman, who lists her among his dedications in his 2011 book Unfair Trade.

By 2012 Shalet was becoming increasingly disenchanted with acting, and decided to change careers.

From the age of six I was acting, but I got to my early twenties and realised my heart just wasn't in it. Then I had some therapy myself and it really did make me re-evaluate what I wanted from life. I did a foundation year in counselling and knew I wanted to take it further. The crunch came when I was accepted onto a training course that would qualify me to be a therapist. On the same day I got a call back from an audition to be a regular in ‘'Holby City'’. When I didn't get the part I saw it as a sign that I had to give up acting altogether to do the four-year course. I had to make a choice and I've never regretted it.

In 2013 she then became engaged to actor Adam James, and they married in September 2015. Their first child was born in September 2016, and she is stepmother to his daughter from a previous relationship.

== Filmography ==
=== Television ===
Year	Title	Role	Notes
1989	Screenplay	Rosie Taylor	Episode: "Testimony of a Child"
1989	Ball Trap on the Cote Sauvage	Anna	Screen One
1990	Jim Henson's Mother Goose Stories	Dorothy (The Giant) / Jenny (Little Girl With the Curl)	2 Episodes
1991	Van der Valk	Brigid van Hoorn	Episode: "A Sudden Silence"
1991	Spatz	Emily Jane Mudge	Episodes: "Star Attraction" "Talent Contest"
1991	The Storyteller: Greek Myths	King Minos' 2nd Daughter	Episode: "Daedalus & Icarus"
1991	The Maid/ Un Amour de Banquier	Marie, Jacqueline's Daughter	TV Movie
1992	Love Hurts	Ben Hamilton	3 Episodes
1992	Thinkabout Science	Heather	Episode: "Soap and Bubbles"
1992	Natural Lies	Sally Fell	TV Mini-Series; 3 Episodes
1993	Goggle-Eyes	Jude Killen	TV Mini-Series; 4 Episodes
1995–2001	The Queen's Nose	Harmony Parker	Main role; 24 Episodes
1998	Getting Hurt	Clare Cross	BBC2 Obsessions series
1999	Chucklevision		Comic Relief Special
2001	The Vice	Sarah Farrell	3 Episodes
2001	The Bill	Sophie	Episode: "Crush"
2002	The Quest	Vivienne	TV Movie
2002/2009	Midsomer Murders	Julia Carter (2002) / Melony (2009)	Episodes: "Murder on St Malley's Day" (2002) "The Black Book" (2009)
2003	Jonathan Creek	Carrie Bergman	Episode: "The Tailor's Dummy"
2003	Eroica	Kirstin	TV Movie
2004	Every Seven Years	Waitress	Short Film
2005	M.I.T.:Murder Investigation Team	Nurse	1 Episode
2007	Doctors	Beth Pritchard	Episode: "The Story Of My Life"
2008	Close	Mags	Short Film
2008	We Saw Zebras	Mother	Short Film
2009–2012	Doctors	PC Vickie Hilton	Recurring role

=== Film ===
Year	Title	Role	Notes
1990	The Maid	Marie	
1992	Shining Through	Dietrich's Daughter	
1995	Haunted	Juliet Ash	
2001	The Affair of the Necklace	Colleen	

=== Video games ===
Year	Title	Role	Notes
2004	Dragon Quest VIII	Princess Medea	Voice
