= Miss Trunchbull =

Agatha Trunchbull
- Matilda character
- Pam Ferris as Miss Trunchbull in Matilda (1996)
- First appearance: Matilda (1988)
- Created by: Roald Dahl
- Portrayed by: Pam Ferris (1996 film); Bertie Carvel (original musical cast); Emma Thompson (2022 film)

In-universe information
- Gender: Female
- Occupation: School headmistress / principal (formerly)
- Family: Mrs. Honey (sister/step-sister); Julian Honey (nephew-in-law/step-nephew-in-law); Jennifer Honey (niece/step-niece); Dr. Magnus Honey (brother-in-law); Matilda Honey [formerly Wormwood] (adoptive great-niece)
- Nationality: British

Miss Agatha Trunchbull (nicknamed The Trunchbull) is the fictional dictator-like headmistress of Crunchem Hall Primary School (or Elementary School) and the main antagonist in Roald Dahl's 1988 novel Matilda and its adaptations: the 1996 film Matilda (in which she was played by Pam Ferris), the 2011 musical, and the 2022 musical film adaptation (in which she was played by Emma Thompson). She is said to look "more like a rather eccentric and bloodthirsty follower of the stag hounds than the headmistress of a nice school for children".

Miss Trunchbull is depicted as an unwholesome role model, a fierce tyrannical monster who "frightened the life out of pupils and teachers alike", notorious for her cruel and wildly idiosyncratic discipline, with trivial misdeeds (including simply wearing pigtails) incurring punishments up to potentially fatal physical discipline.

== Fictional character biography ==
Miss Trunchbull is the despotic headmistress of Crunchem Hall, and her bizarre and extreme discipline is handed out over the most minor misdeeds. Small transgressions, even if unintentional, are often penalised severely. Miss Trunchbull's contempt for children is so great that she denies ever having been a child, aside from one instance in the novel where she claims she was not a child for very long and became a woman very fast. In many adaptations, Miss Trunchbull often exhibits narcissistic traits, such as psychological projection and extreme self-importance. In spite of her cruelty and sadism, Trunchbull considers herself to be a magnanimous and heroic figure, believing the children she punishes are inherently evil and deserving of the punishments they receive. She refers to children as gangsters, vipers, criminals, monsters, imps, hooligans, miscreants, maggots, goblins, murderers, kidnappers or members of the mafia. Trunchbull especially considers Matilda to be a malicious, dangerous person. In the musical, Miss Trunchbull considers Matilda to be "the axis of evil" and in the 1996 film, Miss Trunchbull refers to Matilda as "a carbuncle, a blister, a festering pustule of malignant ooze". In the 2022 film adaptation of the musical, it is revealed that Miss Trunchbull cannot stand anybody saying no to her, and in the 1996 film, Miss Trunchbull claims that in the school, she is God.

Agatha Trunchbull is the aunt of Jennifer Honey and served as her childhood guardian after the death of her parents, having already moved into the family home following the death of Jennifer's mother (Agatha's sister). In the 1996 film and the musical film adaptation, she is Jennifer's step-aunt. It is strongly implied that Agatha murdered Magnus Honey, Jennifer's father, and made it appear to be suicide. Agatha then became the legal owner of the Honey estate and Jennifer's legal guardian. Jennifer's exposure as a little girl to Agatha's abuse inevitably rendered her soft-spoken and timid. Jennifer admits she became Agatha's slave, doing the chores and housework. In the film, Agatha mentions having once broken Jennifer's arm. Once Jennifer graduated from school and teacher training college, Agatha seized hold of Jennifer's hard-earned salary, wanting her to pay off the food she ate and the clothes she wore as a child, for the first five years of her teaching career (in the 1988 novel, she left her with a net pay of £1 per week, calling it "pocket money").

It is revealed that Miss Trunchbull is superstitious and has an intense fear of ghosts, black cats, and the supernatural in general. In support of her schoolteacher, Matilda thus uses her telekinetic abilities to drive Miss Trunchbull from her own house by posing as Magnus' spirit and levitating a chalk stick to scrawl a message on the board, warning her to give his daughter her house and money. Terrified, Miss Trunchbull faints. Later, she subsequently flees, and the house is passed to Miss Honey, who in the films also becomes the school's new headmistress. In the novel, the deputy head Mr. Trilby (not seen or mentioned in any of the films) takes over the headship of the school.

In the 1996 film, Miss Trunchbull is a former shot putter, hammer, and javelin thrower, having competed in the 1972 Summer Olympics as a young adult; in the musical, the song "The Hammer" suggests she became the "English hammer-throwing champion" in 1969, while in the novel, she performed similar exploits, but the exact dates and events are not mentioned. She often throws children into the sky or out of upper storey windows and uses a crop to scare children as punishment, which often ends in accidents or injuries. In the film, Miss Trunchbull showcases her Olympian strength when she "hammer-throws" a girl named Amanda Thripp by her pigtails after telling her to chop off her pigtails, sending the child several hundred feet into the air. Amanda miraculously lands softly in a field of blooming wildflowers. Another instance involves a boy named Bruce Bogtrotter, who, after eating a piece of Ms Trunchbull's chocolate cake, is "disciplined" in front of the entire student body by being forced to eat an entire colossal chocolate cake, on stage, during a school assembly. Miss Trunchbull's reasoning for the punishment is that cake is "much too good for children", who do not deserve to eat any. In the novel, Trunchbull relates having used corporal punishment on the pupils when it was legal, but its recent ban in state schools does not stop her from using cruel and unusual punishment. Also in the novel, according to Hortensia, Trunchbull treats parents the same way she treats children, leaving them afraid to stand up to her.

Due to her physically demanding lifestyle, Miss Trunchbull is described in the book as being a very imposing and muscular woman, with a neck similar to that of a buffalo, legs resembling hams, and thick, trunk-like arms. Adaptations frequently portray her as having broad shoulders and a pink, flustered complexion.

== Inspiration ==
As children, Roald Dahl and his friends played a trick on the local sweet shop owner, a "mean and loathsome" old woman named Ms. Pratchett, by putting a dead mouse in a gobstopper jar. This would later inspire Dahl to include a scene in Matilda where Matilda's friend Lavender puts a newt into Miss Trunchbull's water jug. According to Dahl's widow Felicity's annotations in More About Boy, the matron at St Peter's preparatory school in Weston-super-Mare, which Dahl attended, could have been another inspiration as she was a bully and is described as having a similar body shape.

She was also inspired by Faina Melnik, the Olympic gold medallist in the 1972 Summer Olympics.

== Portrayals ==
Miss Trunchbull is portrayed by Pam Ferris in the 1996 film, and by Bertie Carvel in the musical, later replaced by former Two of a Kind and Shrek The Musical star Christopher Sieber. Emma Thompson plays the role in the 2022 film adaptation of the musical.

Miriam Margolyes confirmed that she auditioned for the role in the 1996 film during a filmed interview with Jo Brand for the UK television special Roald Dahl's Revolting Rule Book which was hosted by Richard E. Grant and aired on 22 September 2007. This documentary commemorated Dahl's 90th birthday and also celebrated his impact as a children's author in popular culture.
