= Pam Ferris =

British actress (born 1948)

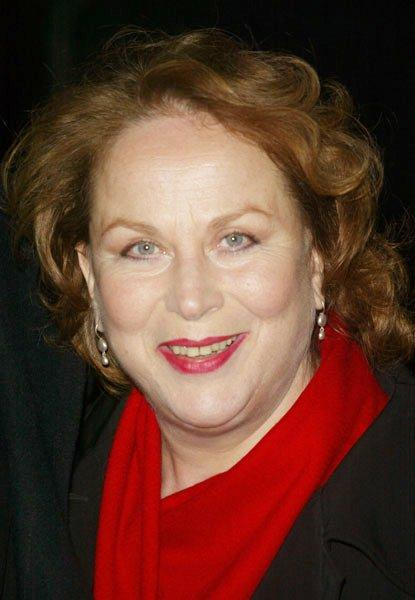
- Ferris in 2012
- Born: Pamela Ferris; 11 May 1948 (age 78); Hanover, Lower Saxony, Allied-occupied Germany
- Occupation: Actress
- Years active: 1970–present
- Spouse: Roger Frost (m. 1986)

Pamela Ferris (born 11 May 1948) is a British actress. She starred in the British television series Connie (1985), The Darling Buds of May (1991–1993), Where the Heart Is (1997–2000), Rosemary & Thyme (2003–2006), and Call the Midwife (2012–2016; 2026). In film, Ferris played Miss Trunchbull in Matilda (1996). For her role as Peggy Snow in Where the Heart Is, Ferris was nominated for Most Popular Actress thrice at the National Television Awards.

Ferris portrayed Marge Dursley in Harry Potter and the Prisoner of Azkaban (2004), Miriam in Children of Men (2006), Mrs. Bevan in Nativity! (2009) and Nativity 2: Danger in the Manger (2012), voiced Mrs. Bennett / Aunty Betty in Ethel & Ernest (2016) and played Mrs. Faulkner in Tolkien (2019). In theatre, her performance as Phoebe Rice in The Entertainer at The Old Vic in London saw Ferris being nominated for the 2007 Laurence Olivier Award for Best Performance in a Supporting Role.

== Early life ==
Ferris was born on 11 May 1948 in Hanover, Lower Saxony, Germany, to a Welsh mother and an English father who was serving in the Royal Air Force. After her parents returned to the United Kingdom, Ferris spent her childhood in the Aberkenfig area, near Bridgend in Wales. Her father, Fred Ferris, was a policeman, and her mother, Ann Perkins, worked in her family's bakery business.

== Career ==
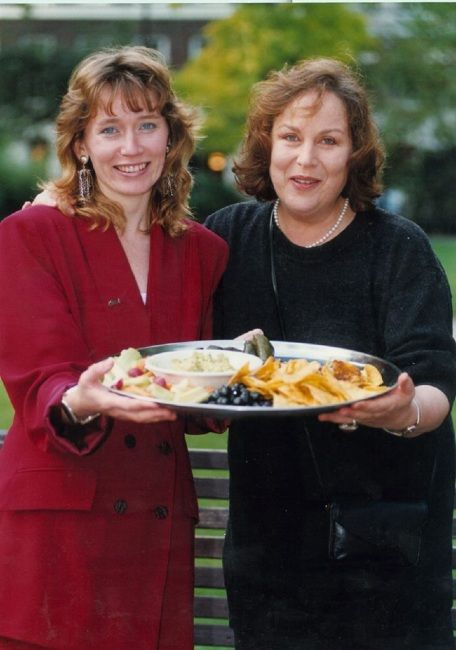
Ferris (right) with Juliet Gellatley at the launch of Viva! in 1994

Ferris performed in her younger years at the Mercury Theatre in Auckland, and later with various regional companies in the United Kingdom. She played motherly Ma Larkin in the ITV series The Darling Buds of May, which ran from 1991 to 1993. Ferris was the subject of This Is Your Life in 1991, when she was surprised by Michael Aspel while recording an episode of The Darling Buds of May at Yorkshire Television in Leeds. Ferris has also acted in a succession of television dramas, including Meantime, in which she played the Cockney mother of Phil Daniels and Tim Roth, Connie, Hardwicke House, Oranges Are Not the Only Fruit, Where the Heart Is, and Paradise Heights. From 2003 to 2006, Ferris played the gardening sleuth Laura Thyme in Rosemary & Thyme, starring opposite Felicity Kendal. Her roles in costume dramas include parts in television adaptations of Middlemarch, The Tenant of Wildfell Hall, Our Mutual Friend, The Turn of the Screw, Pollyanna, and Jane Eyre.

In 1996, Ferris portrayed the brutish, authoritarian school headmistress Miss Agatha Trunchbull in Matilda (a role played by male actors in the stage musical version). Eight years later, she played the foul-mouthed Marge Dursley in Harry Potter and the Prisoner of Azkaban. In 2006, Ferris took on the role of Miriam, a motherly British activist, in Children of Men. She voiced Mrs. Bennett/Aunty Betty in the animated biographical film Ethel & Ernest, which was broadcast on BBC One on 26 December 2016, and played Mrs. Faulkner in Tolkien (2019). Ferris has also acted in productions for BBC Radio 4.

Ferris' career in the theatre has included parts in Royal Court Theatre and National Theatre productions. In 2007, she played Phoebe Rice in a revival of John Osborne's The Entertainer at London's Old Vic Theatre. That same year, Ferris took part in the BBC Wales programme Coming Home about her Welsh family history. In 2008, Ferris played Mrs. General in a BBC adaptation of the Charles Dickens novel Little Dorrit. From 2009 to 2010, she appeared in the final series of the BBC comedy Gavin & Stacey as Cath Smith. In 2010, Ferris made a guest appearance in the sitcom Grandma's House. From 2012 to 2016, she played the part of Sister Evangelina in the series Call the Midwife. In June and July 2015, Ferris was the guest of Sarah Walker on BBC Radio 3's Essential Classics.

== Personal life ==
In 1986, Ferris married actor Roger Frost. She lives in Elham, Kent, England. In a 2012 interview with The Guardian, Ferris said, "I was obsessed with work in my youth. It's why I didn't get married until I was 38 and the reason I didn't have kids. Not having children isn't a sadness in my life, though. I know I wouldn't have been a half-bad mother, but that's what happened. There's no regretting it."

== Filmography ==
=== Film ===
Year	Title	Role	Notes
1983	Meantime	Mavis	
1996	Matilda	Miss Agatha Trunchbull	
2002	Death to Smoochy	Tommy Cotter	
2003	Pollyanna	Mrs. Snow	
2004	Harry Potter and the Prisoner of Azkaban	Marge Dursley	
2004	Piccadilly Jim	Miss Trimble	
2006	Children of Men	Miriam	
2009	Nativity!	Mrs. Bevan	
2009	Telstar	Mrs. Violet Shenton	
2009	Malice in Wonderland	The Duchess	
2012	The Raven	Mrs. Bradley	
2012	Nativity 2: Danger in the Manger	Mrs. Bevan	
2013	Saving Santa	Mrs. Claus	
2016	Ethel & Ernest	Mrs. Bennett / Aunty Betty (voice)	
2018	Holmes & Watson	Queen Victoria	
2019	Tolkien	Mrs. Faulkner	

=== Television ===
Year	Title	Role	Notes
1971	BBC Play of the Month	Puck and Fairie	Episode: “A Midsummer Night's Dream”
1984	Dramarama	Dorothy	Episode: “Dodger, Bonzo and the Rest”
1985	The Bill	Mrs. Draper	Episode: “Death of a Cracksmen”
1985	Connie	Nesta	13 episodes
1986	Ladies in Charge	Charlie	Episode: “Double Act”
1987	Hardwicke House	Ms. Crabbe	2 episodes broadcast, 5 unaired and all 7 uploaded to YouTube in 2019.
1987	Lizzie's Pictures	Grace	3 episodes
1987	Dramarama	Anne Bailey	Episode: “Peter”
1987	Casualty	Linda	Episode: “The Raid”
1988	The Fear	Brenda	Episode: “#1.1”
1988	Valentine Park	Mrs. Fox	Episode: “A Rose By Any Other Name”
1988	South of the Border	Brenda	Episode: “#1.6”
1989	All Change	Maggie Oldfield	Episode: “The Bosom of the Family”
1990	Oranges Are Not the Only Fruit	Mrs. Arkwright	3 episodes
1990	A Sense of Guilt	Magdalen Parry	3 episodes
1991–1993	The Darling Buds of May	Florence "Ma" Larkin	20 episodes
1992	Mr Wakefield's Crusade	Mad Marion	2 episodes
1992	Cluedo	Mrs. White	6 episodes
1992	Performance	Mrs. Bryant	Episode: “Roots”
1993	Comedy Playhouse	Matron	Episode: “Once in a Lifetime”
1994	Middlemarch	Mrs. Dollop	3 episodes
1994	The World of Peter Rabbit and Friends	Aunt Pettitoes (voice)	Episode: “The Tale of Pigling Bland”
1994	The Rector's Wife	Eleanor Ramsay	2 episodes
1995	Screen Two	Alice Hartley	Episode: “Mrs Hartley and the Growth Centre“
1996	Wycliffe	Pat Trethowan	Episode: “Last Judgment”
1996	The Tenant of Wildfell Hall	Mrs. Markham	2 episodes
1997–2000	Where the Heart Is	Peggy Snow	36 episodes
1998	Our Mutual Friend	Mrs. Boffin	4 episodes
1999	The Turn of the Screw	Mrs Grose	Television film
2001	Linda Green	Norma Fitts	Episode: “Victim Support”
2002	Paradise Heights	Marion Eustace	6 episodes
2003	Clocking Off	Pat Fletcher	6 episodes
2003–2006	Rosemary & Thyme	Laura Thyme	22 episodes
2004	Agatha Christie's Marple	Elspeth McGillicuddy	Episode: “4:50 from Paddington”
2006	Jane Eyre	Grace Poole	4 episodes
2007	Lilies	Alice Bird	Episode: “The Serpent”
2008	Little Dorrit	Mrs. Hortensia General	9 episodes
2009, 2024	Gavin & Stacey	Catherina "Cath" Smith	3 episodes
2010	Grandma's House	Deborah Adler	Episode: “The Day Simon Announced He Was in Control of the Universe”
2011	Midsomer Murders	Liz Tomlin	Episode: “Echoes of the Dead”
2011	Luther	Baba	3 episodes
2012–2016, 2026	Call the Midwife	Sister Evangelina	37 episodes
2020	Urban Myths	Madame Gaudin	Episode: “Les Dawson’s Parisienne Adventure”
2021	Beauty and the Beast: A Comic Relief Pantomime for Christmas	Marie	
2026	Amandaland	Elspeth	Episode: “Big House”
TBA	The Secret Diary of Adrian Mole Aged 13¾	Grandma Mole	Recurring character

=== Theatre ===
Year	Play	Role	Venue	Notes
1972	Gas Light	Bella Manningham	Ipswich Arts Theatre, Ipswich	
1972	Murder in the Cathedral	Woman of Canterbury	Ipswich Arts Theatre, Ipswich	
1972	Gamma Gurton's Needle	Dame Chat	Ipswich Arts Theatre, Ipswich	
1972	Captain Pugwash	Cannibal	Ipswich Arts Theatre, Ipswich	
1974	Time and Time Again	Anna	Ipswich Arts Theatre, Ipswich	
1979	Bleak House	Lady Dedlock	Royal Court Theatre, London	with Shared Experience
1979	Cymbeline	Imogen	Royal Court Theatre, London	with Shared Experience
1984	The Luckey Chance	Various roles	Royal Court Theatre, London	with Women's Playhouse Trust
1985	The Grace of Mary Traverse	Mrs. Temptwell	Royal Court Theatre, London	
1988	Roots	Mrs. Bryant	Cottesloe Theatre, London	
1991	The Seagull	Irina Nikolayevna Arkadina	UK Tour	with Oxford Stage Company
1994	The Queen and I	Queen Elizabeth II	Leicester Haymarket Theatre - Leicester, Royal Court Theatre - London & UK Tour	with Out of Joint Theatre Company
1994	Road	Brenda/Helen/Joe's Mum/Mr and Mrs Bald	Leicester Haymarket Theatre - Leicester, Royal Court Theatre - London & UK Tour	with Out of Joint Theatre Company
2002	Closing Time	Vera	Royal National Theatre, London	
2004	Notes on Falling Leaves	Mother	Royal Court Theatre, London	
2007	The Entertainer	Phoebe Rice	The Old Vic, London	

== Awards and nominations ==
Year	Award	Category	Work	Result
1996	Saturn Awards	Best Supporting Actress	Matilda	Nominated
1997	National Television Awards	Most Popular Actress	Where the Heart Is	Nominated
1998	National Television Awards	Most Popular Actress	Where the Heart Is	Nominated
2000	National Television Awards	Most Popular Actress	Where the Heart Is	Nominated
2003	Michael Elliott Trust Awards	Actress of the Year	—N/a	Won
2005	Evening Standard Theatre Awards	Best Actress	Notes on Falling Leaves	Nominated
2008	Clarence Derwent Awards	Best Female in a Supporting Role	The Entertainer	Won
2008	Laurence Olivier Awards	Best Performance in a Supporting Role	The Entertainer	Nominated
