= The Queen's Nose =

1983 novel by Dick King-Smith

- First edition
- Author: Dick King-Smith
- Language: English
- Genre: Fantasy
- Publisher: Gollancz
- Publication date: 10 February 1983
- Publication place: United Kingdom
- Media type: Print (hardcover & paperback)
- Pages: 111pp (first edition)
- ISBN: 0-06-023245-5; ISBN 978-0-06-023245-0; ISBN 0-06-023246-3; ISBN 978-0-06-023246-7
- OCLC: 11624157
- LC Class: PZ7.K5893 Qe 1983

The Queen's Nose is a children's novel by Dick King-Smith, first published by Gollancz in 1983 with illustrations by Jill Bennett. Set in England, where King-Smith lived, it features a girl who can use a fifty pence coin to make wishes. When the book was reprinted in 1994 publishers HarperTrophy commissioned a new cover art illustrated by Michael Koelsch. The book was adapted into the 1995 TV series The Queen's Nose, which ran for 7 series.

== Plot ==
The book by Dick King-Smith features the story of Harmony Parker, a 10-year-old girl who wants an animal of her own, but this is not allowed by her parents, who think that animals are dirty. Harmony has a 15-year-old sister, Melody, who spends most of her time looking in a mirror. Harmony's best friend is a toy dog, Rex Ruff Monty.

Harmony believes that animals are more interesting than people, and so she pictures the people she meets as animals; her father is a sea lion, her mother a Pouter pigeon and her sister a Siamese cat.

She receives a magic 50p coin from her uncle Ginger, which grants her seven wishes whenever she rubs the side of the coin that Queen Elizabeth II's nose is pointed at.

== Releases ==
=== Audio books ===
Book	Year Published	Cover Picture	Notes
The Queen's Nose: Cassette Tape	November 1988		
The Queen's Nose: Cavalcade story cassettes	17 June 1996	Various characters standing on a fifty pence.	
The Queen's Nose: Audio Download	5 December 2008	Rabbit	

=== Books ===
Book	Year Published	Cover Picture	Notes
The Queen's Nose	10 February 1983	A Girl with a bear	Hardback; Original 1st Edition.
The Queen's Nose	1983	A Girl with a bear	Hardback; 1st American edition.
The Queen's Nose	March 1984	A Girl with a bear	Hardback; Second Impression.
The Queen's Nose	April 1985	A Girl with a bear.	Library Binding.
The Queen's Nose	28 November 1985	A Rabbit.	Paperback Original Book by Dick King-Smith; Re-released a number of times.
The Queen's Nose	1989	Unknown	Hard Cover Re-print.
The Queen's Nose	September 1994	Michael Koelsch	Paperback Re-print.
The Queen's Nose	26 October 1995	A picture of Victoria Shalet from the TV series with a rabbit.	Paperback TV Tie-in ed edition
The Queen's Nose: Harmony's Return	29 October 1996	A picture of Victoria Shalet from the TV series with a hamster.	Paperback TV Tie-in ed edition
Queen's Nose: Harmony's Holiday	31 October 1998	A picture of Victoria Shalet from the TV series with a duck.	Paperback TV Tie-in ed edition
The Queen's Nose	1996	Unknown	Paperback TV Paperback Re-print.
The Queen's Nose	1 November 2002	Unknown	Paperback Re-print in Large Print.
The Queen's Nose	17 January 2005	A Rabbit	Paperback Re-print.
