= Alan Thomas =

Al(l)an or Allen Thomas may refer to:

- Alan B. Thomas Jr., businessman and American government official
- Alan G. Thomas (1911–1992), British bibliophile and Lawrence Durrell scholar
- Alan G. Thomas (scientist) (1927–2019), British materials scientist
- Alan Thomas (philosopher) (born 1964), British philosopher
- Alan Thomas (cricketer) (born 1947), former English cricketer
- J. Alan Thomas (1950–2007), American film and television actor
- Allan Thomas (born 1990), Lebanese-South African football goalkeeper
- Allen Thomas (1830–1907), Confederate States Army brigadier general
- Algy Thomas (Alan Robert Francis Thomas, 1940–2015), Welsh rugby union player

== See also ==
- Alun Thomas (disambiguation)
