= Presidential Management Fellows Program =

Program in the US government

U.S. Presidential Management Fellows Program
- Formation: 1977; 49 years ago
- Dissolved: 2025 (47 years)
- Purpose: A paid two-year fellowship at a U.S. government agency for U.S. citizens with advanced degrees.
- Affiliations: Office of Personnel Management, President of the United States (E.O. 13562)
- Website: www.pmf.gov
- Formerly called: Presidential Management Intern Program (1977–2003)

The Presidential Management Fellows (PMF) Program was a two-year training and leadership development program at a United States government agency, administered by the U.S. Office of Personnel Management (OPM), for advanced degree holders (both current and recent graduates). After completing the program, agencies may convert PMFs to permanent federal civilian employees. The program started in 1977, was renamed in 2003, and abolished in 2025.

== History ==
The PMF Program was established by executive order in 1977, and amended by in 2003, to attract to the federal service outstanding citizen-scholars from a variety of academic disciplines and career paths who have a clear interest in, and commitment to, excellence in the leadership and management of public policies and programs. By drawing graduate students from diverse social and cultural backgrounds, the PMF Program provided a continuing source of trained men and women to meet the future challenges of public service. The PMF program was formerly referred to as the Presidential Management Internship (PMI) program.

Program regulations were amended again in December 2010 establishing the PMF Program as one of the three student Pathways to federal employment. In September 2013, OPM added a new STEM track to the PMF process to increase opportunities for science and technology students and meet the demand for qualified candidates for these roles in government, but this track was later removed.

In February 2025, President Donald Trump issued an executive order that ended the program.

== Eligibility ==
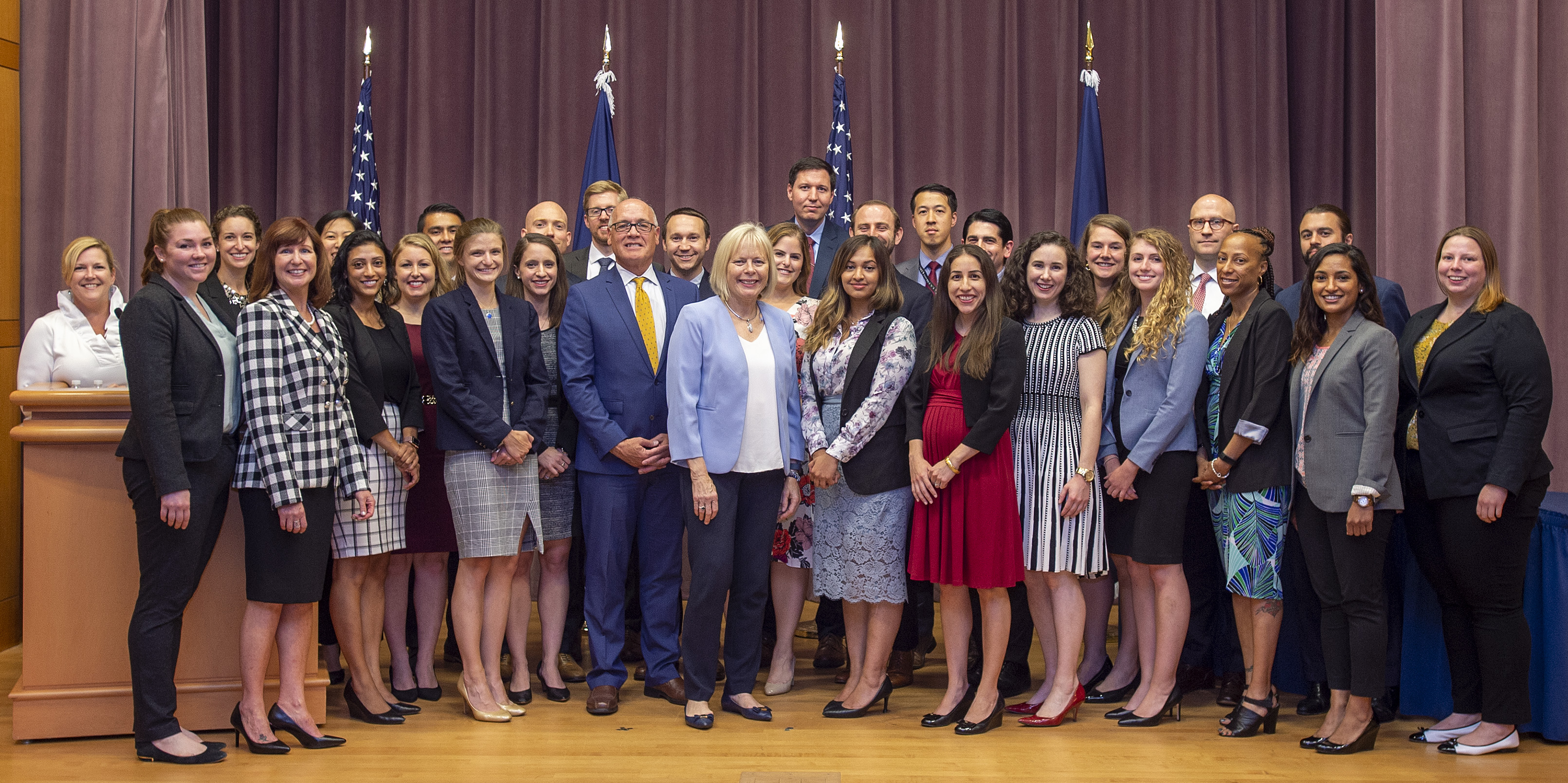
State Department PMF class of 2019

There are two situations where graduate students may be eligible to apply to the PMF program. Graduate students from all academic disciplines who expect to complete an advanced degree from a qualifying college or university by August 31 of the academic year in which the competition is held are eligible to become fellows. Alternatively, those who have completed an advanced degree (masters or professional) from a qualifying college or university during the previous 2 years from the opening date of the PMF Program's application announcement are eligible. Individuals who previously applied for the program, but were not selected as a finalist, may reapply if they meet eligibility requirements. Finalists come from a diverse range of graduate institutions, but the schools with the most PMF finalists in 2014 included American University, University of Michigan, Harvard University, Georgetown University, George Washington University, Columbia University, and Johns Hopkins University.

The application process requires a résumé, an online assessment, and short essays. Potential fellows should demonstrate breadth and quality of accomplishments, capacity for leadership, exceptional oral and written communication skills, and a commitment to excellence in the leadership and management of public policies and programs. The application occurs usually during the autumn. OPM announces finalists' names during winter. Those who are nominated as finalists remain finalists for one year, unless appointed by an agency during that year. Finalists may reapply to the program before the year of appointment eligibility ends; however, status as a current finalist is forfeited upon accessing the on-line assessment. The program is extremely competitive: for the PMF class of 2013, there were 663 finalists (eligible for appointment as fellows), who were selected from well over 12,000 nominees, an acceptance rate of approximately 5.5%.

== Alumni ==
=== Presidential Management Alumni Association (PMAA) ===
The Presidential Management Alumni Association (PMAA) is a 501(c)(3) nonprofit organization created to improve, expand, and promote the alumni community as well as the PMF Program.

=== PMAG ===
The non-profit Presidential Management Alumni Group (PMAG) was formerly the primary alumni group for PMIs and PMFs. It was organized in 1981 to advance the professionalism of public service and augment the education and career development of those who have served in or assisted the PMF Program. PMAG was not sponsored by OPM. The members were fellows, alumni, and other individuals interested in recruitment and development of federal government career managers. PMAG sponsored professional and social activities, maintained a network among alumni, and provided support to maintain the PMF Program as the federal government’s premier mechanism for recruiting future managers.

=== Notable alumni ===
- Craig B. Allen – United States ambassador to Brunei
- Kenneth S. Apfel – 13th United States commissioner of social security
- Jeff Merkley – U.S. senator from Oregon
- Andy Kim – United States senator from New Jersey
- Roberta S. Jacobson – Former U.S. assistant secretary of state for western hemisphere affairs and U.S. ambassador to Mexico
- Matthew Auer – Public policy scholar, currently serving as Dean of University of Georgia School of Public and International Affairs
- Mitch Bainwol – CEO of the Alliance of Automobile Manufacturers, former CEO of the Recording Industry Association of America
- Robert G. Berschinski – Deputy Assistant Secretary of State during the Obama administration
- Richard Boly – American diplomat and Director of the Office of eDiplomacy at US Department of State
- Grace Crunican – transit policymaker currently overseeing Bay Area Rapid Transit; former deputy administrator at the Federal Transit Administration during the Clinton administration
- Mike Dovilla – former member of the Ohio House of Representatives
- Michael J. Fitzpatrick - American diplomat
- Barbara Favola – State senator for Senate of Virginia
- Kyle Foggo – former executive director of the Central Intelligence Agency
- Alan Friedman – American journalist covering finance and foreign affairs
- Colleen Hartman – Deputy Director at NASA for the Goddard Space Flight Center, Professor at Elliott School of International Affairs at George Washington University
- Brendan Kyle Hatcher – American diplomat
- Kathleen Hicks – Deputy Secretary of Defense
- Baxter Hunt – American diplomat and son of North Carolina governor James Baxter Hunt, Jr.
- Derek Kan – Executive Associate Director of the Office of Management and Budget former general manager at Lyft, member of Amtrak Board of Directors (appointed by Barack Obama)
- Betsy Markey – former U.S. representative for Colorado's 4th congressional district
- David Norquist – former deputy secretary of defense
- Sean O'Keefe – Chairman and CEO of aerospace giant Airbus Group, Inc., former Chancellor of Louisiana State University, Administrator of NASA from 2001–2004, Secretary of the Navy from 1992-1993
- Natalie Quillian – White House deputy chief of staff (2023-present), White House deputy coronavirus response coordinator (2021-2022)
- Nicholas Rasmussen – Director of the National Counterterrorism Center
- Anne C. Richard – Assistant Secretary of State for Population, Refugees, and Migration at the United States Department of State
- Suzanne Rivera – President of Macalester College
- Alvin Salehi – Senior Technology Advisor at the White House and Co-Founder of Code.gov
- Dan Seals (politician) – business consultant and a Democratic political candidate from Illinois
- Deena Shakir - venture capitalist at Lux Capital
- Dan Tangherlini – Administrator of General Services Administration in the Barack Obama Administration
- Alan B. Thomas, Jr. – Commissioner, Federal Acquisition Service
- Will Tiao – actor and television writer
- Kierston Todt – Cybersecurity scholar and policymaker
- Damon Wilson – executive vice president at the Atlantic Council and formerly the senior director for European affairs at the U.S. National Security Council
- Nancy Potok – former chief statistician of the United States
- Bonnie Jenkins – Under Secretary of State for Arms Control and International Security Affairs, Former U.S. ambassador at the U.S. Department of State, serving as Coordinator for Threat Reduction Programs in the Bureau of International Security and Nonproliferation
- Matt Welbes – Executive Director of the Federal Transit Administration (FTA)
- Shalanda Young – Director of the Office of Management and Budget
- Nani Coloretti – Deputy Director of the Office of Management and Budget
- Laura Rosenberger – Chair of the American Institute in Taiwan, former special assistant to the president and senior director for China and Taiwan at the National Security Council in the Biden administration
