= Kiersten =

Kiersten is a feminine given name. Notable people with the name include:

- Kiersten Dallstream (born 1988), American former soccer player
- Kiersten Modglin, American author
- Kiersten Todt, Chief of Staff of the Cybersecurity and Infrastructure Security Agency (2021–2023)
- Kiersten Warren (born 1965), American actress
- Kiersten White (born 1983), American author

== See also ==
- Keirsten Alley (born 1973), American former professional tennis player
- Kierston Wareing (born 1976), British actress
