= List of National Speech and Debate Association members =

The National Speech and Debate Association (NSDA) is the largest interscholastic speech and debate organization serving middle school and high school students in the United States. It was known as the National Forensic League from 1925 to 2014. Many NSDA alumni have risen to the pinnacle of their respective fields, including the following.

== Academia ==
Name	Chapter	Notability	Ref.
Tracy Packiam Alloway	Liberty University	Professor of psychology at the University of North Florida	
Douglas Bernheim	Harvard School	Professor of economics at Stanford University	
John Bessler	Loyola High School	Professor of law at the University of Baltimore School of Law	
Russell L. Caldwell	Wooster High School	History professor and chair at the University of Southern California	
Brittney Cooper	Ruston High School	Professor of women's and gender studies and Africana studies at Rutgers University-New Brunswick	
Mike Edmonds	Northwest High School	academic administrator and acting co-president of Colorado College	
Kenneth Hersh	St. Mark's School of Texas	CEO of the George W. Bush Presidential Center	
Leah Litman	Edina High School	Professor at the University of Michigan Law Schoo	
W. Walter Menninger	Topeka High School	Dean of the Karl Menninger School of Psychiatry and Mental Health Science and CEO of the Menninger Clinic	
Melissa Murray	Lincoln Park Academy	Professor of law at New York University	
Benjamin Olken	Milton Academy	Economist and professor at the Massachusetts Institute of Technology	
Elinor Ostrom	Beverly Hills High School	Winner of the Nobel Memorial Prize in Economic Sciences and professor of political science at Indiana University,	
Farah Pandith	Milton Academy	Senior fellow with the Future of Diplomacy Project at the Belfer Center for Science and International Affairs at the Harvard Kennedy School	
Sarah Parcak	Bangor High School	Egyptologist and professor of anthropology at the University of Alabama at Birmingham	
James Poterba	Pennsbury High School	Professor of economics at the Massachusetts Institute of Technology and president and CEO of the National Bureau of Economic Research	
Robert D. Putnam	Port Clinton High School	Political scientist and professor at the Harvard Kennedy School	
Lewis Sargentich	Alhambra High School	Professor at Harvard Law School	
John Sexton	Brooklyn Preparatory School	Professor of Law at New York University	
David Alan Sklansky	Corona del Mar High School	Professor of law at Stanford Law School	
Anand Veeravagu	Grapevine High School	Neurosurgeon at Stanford University Hospital and Clinics	

== Business ==
Name	Chapter	Notability	Ref.
Aimee Allison	Antioch High School	Founder of She the People	
Roy Bahat	Stuyvesant High School	Venture capitalist	
Austan Goolsbee	Milton Academy	President of the Federal Reserve Bank of Chicago and chairman of the Council of Economic Advisers	
Frances Haugen	Iowa City West High School	Whistleblower on Facebook	
Ann Kim	Apple Valley High School	James Beard Award-winning chef and restaurateur	
Craig Newmark	Morristown High School	Founder of Craigslist	
Justin Rosenstein	The College Preparatory School	Software programmer and co-founder of Asana	
Deena Shakir	Leland High School	Venture capitalist	
Ben Silbermann	Des Moines Roosevelt High School	Co-founder and executive chairman of Pinterest	

== Entertainment ==
Name	Chapter	Notability	Ref.
Kalen Allen	Sumner Academy of Arts & Science	Actor and internet personality	
Kristen Soltis Anderson	Cypress Creek High School	Republican pollster, television personality, and writer	
Brian Baumgartner	The Westminster Schools	Actor	
Daniel Beaty		Actor, singer, and writer known as KOA	
David Begnaud	Teurlings Catholic High School	Correspondent for CBS This Morning, the CBS Evening News, and 48 Hours	
Chadwick Boseman	T. L. Hanna High School	Actor	
Benjamin Bratt	Lowell High School	Actor	
Nancy Cartwright	Fairmont West High School	Emmy Award-winning voice actor	
Jessica Chastain	Sacramento City College	Actress and producer	
Stephen Colbert	Porter-Gaud School	Comedian and television host	
Chris Colfer	Clovis East High School	Golden Globe Award winning actor and singer	
Bertha Coombs	Milton Academy	Reporter for CNBC	
Robert Costa	Boston Latin School	Chief election and campaign correspondent for CBS News	
Jim Cummings	Ursuline High School	Voice actor	
James Dean	Fairmount High School	Actor	
Joyce DeWitt	Speedway Senior High School	Actress	
Paul W. Draper	Olympus High School	Mentalist and magician	
Zac Efron	Arroyo Grande High School	Actor	
Billy Eichner	Stuyvesant High School	Actor and comedian	
Nelsan Ellis	Illinois State University	Actor	
Sutton Foster	Troy High School	Broadway actress	
Josh Gad	NSU University School	Actor	
Ginger Gonzaga	Fred C. Beyer High School	Actress	
Becky Gulsvig	Moorhead High School	stage actress	
Arsenio Hall	Ohio University	Comedian, actor, and television host	
LaRoyce Hawkins	Thornton Township High School	Actor, stand-up comedian, spoken word artist, and musician	
Brian Tyree Henry	E. E. Smith High School	Actor	
Marcello Hernández	John Carroll University	Stand-up comedian and actor	
John Hoogenakker	South Mecklenburg High School	Actor	
Chuck Huber	Trinity High School	Voice actor	
David Henry Hwang	Harvard-Westlake School	Playwright and screenwriter	
Hallie Jackson	Pennsbury High School	Correspondent and anchor for NBC News	
Erik Jensen	Apple Valley High School	Actor, playwright, and documentarian	
Cherry Jones	Henry County High School	Actress	
Colin Jost	Regis High School	Comedian, actor, and screenwriter	
David Lindsay-Abaire	Milton Academy	Playwright, screenwriter, and lyricist	
John Lithgow	Princeton High School	Actor	
Tom Llamas	Belen Jesuit Preparatory School	Emmy Award-winning anchor of ABC World News Tonight and NBC Nightly News	
Shelley Long	South Side High School	Actress and comedian	
Jon Lovett	Syosset High School	Podcaster, screenwriter, and television producer	
Carlos Maza		Video producer who started the Vox series Strikethrough	
Brian McBride	Westbury High School	Musician known for Stars of the Lid	
Heather McGhee	Milton Academy	Television political commentator	
Idina Menzel	Syosset High School	Actress	
Hasan Minhaj	Davis Senior High School	Comedian, actor, and producer	
John Moe	Federal Way High School	Radio personality and podcaster	
Anson Mount	Dickson County High School	Actor	
Donna Murphy	Masconomet Regional High School	Actress	
Roberto Orci	Spring Woods High School	Screenwriter and producer	
Jared Padalecki	James Madison High School	Actor	
Fred Parker Jr.	Northside Independent School District	Actor	
Jane Pauley	Warren Central High School	Television host of Today and Dateline NBC	
Jordan Peele	Calhoun School	Comedian, actor, and filmmaker	
Kal Penn	Freehold Township High School	Actor	
Brad Pitt	Kickapoo High School	Actor	
Michaela Jaé Rodriguez	Newark Arts High School	Actress and singer	
Paul Rudd	Shawnee Mission West High School	Actor and comedian	
Danielle Schneider	Spanish River Community High School	Actress	
Heidi Schreck	Wenatchee High School	Screenwriter, playwright, and actress	
Katy Selverstone	Scranton Central High School	Actress	
Yara Shahidi	Dwight Global Online School	Actress and producer	
Casey Simpson	Agoura High School	Actor	
Jenny Slate	Milton Academy	Actress, comedian, and writer	
Brent Spiner	Bellaire High School	Actor known for Star Trek: The Next Generation	
Bruce Springsteen	Freehold Borough High School	Rock musician	
Jason Sudeikis	Shawnee Mission West High School	Actor and comedian	
Maria Thayer	Apple Valley High School	Actress	
Kenan Thompson	Woodward Academy	Comedian and actor	
Stephen Tobolowsky	Justin F. Kimball High School	Actor	
Michael Urie	Plano Senior High School	Actor	
Michael Benjamin Washington	Plano Senior High School	Actor	
Pete Williams	Natrona County High School	Television correspondent for NBC News	
Oprah Winfrey	East Nashville High School	Talk show host, actress, producer, and author	
BD Wong	Abraham Lincoln High School	Actor	
Bowen Yang	Smoky Hill High School	Actor and comedian	
"Weird Al" Yankovic	Lynwood High School	Comedy musician	
Anthony E. Zuiker	Chaparral High School	Screenwriter	

== Law ==
Name	Chapter	Notability	Ref.
Samuel Alito	Hamilton High School East	Justice, Supreme Court of the United States	
Preet Bharara	Ranney School	United States Attorney for the Southern District of New York	
Lisa Blatt	Bellaire High School	Lawyer and partner at the law firm Williams & Connolly	
Stephen Breyer	Lowell High School	Justice, Supreme Court of the United States	
Paul Clement	Cedarburg High School	Solicitor General of the United States	
Viet Dinh	Fullerton High School	United States Assistant Attorney General for the Office of Legal Policy	
David Frederick	Thomas Jefferson High School	Appellate attorney and partner at Kellogg, Hansen, Todd, Figel & Frederick	
Thomas Goldstein	NSU University School	Lawyer and co-founder of SCOTUSblog	
Ketanji Brown Jackson	Miami Palmetto Senior High School	Justice, Supreme Court of the United States	
Neal Katyal	Loyola Academy	Appellate lawyer professor at the Georgetown University Law Center	
Anna M. Manasco	Saint James School	U.S. District judge of the United States District Court for the Northern District of Alabama	
Katherine M. Menendez	Topeka High School	U.S. District judge of the United States District Court for the District of Minnesota	
Janet Reno	Coral Gables High School	United States Attorney General	
Sonia Sotomayor	Cardinal Spellman High School	Justice, Supreme Court of the United States	

== Religion ==
Name	Chapter	Notability	Ref.
Pope Leo XIV	St. Augustine Seminary High School	Bishop of Rome, head of the Catholic Church	

== Literature and print journalism ==
Name	Chapter	Notability	Ref.
Ty Burr	Milton Academy	Film critic at The Boston Globe	
Pintip Dunn	Parsons Senior High School	Author of young adult fiction	
Saeed Jones	Lewisville High School	Poet	
Priya Krishna	Greenhill School	Food journalist for The New York Times	
R. F. Kuang	Greenhill School	Fantasy writer	
Min Jin Lee	Bronx High School of Science	Author and journalist	
Ben Lerner	Topeka High School	Poet, novelist, essayist, and critic	
Larry Magid	Ulysses S. Grant High School	Technology columnist, writer, and commentator	
Celeste Ng	Shaker Heights High School	Novelist	
Alan Sepinwall	Montville High School	Chief television critic for Rolling Stone	
Bryan Washington	James E. Taylor High School	Writer	

== Politics ==
Name	Chapter	Notability	Ref.
Stacey Abrams	Avondale High School	Georgia House of Representatives	
Rebecca Blank	Alexander Ramsey High School	United States Secretary of Commerce	
James H. Burnley IV	High Point Central High School	United States Secretary of Transportation	
G. T. Bynum	Cascia Hall Preparatory School	40th mayor of Tulsa, Oklahoma	
Yvanna Cancela	Carrollton School of the Sacred Heart	White House Senior Advisor to Governors and Statewide Elected Officials and chief of staff to the Governor of Nevada	
Joaquin Castro	Thomas Jefferson High School	United States House of Representatives and Texas House of Representatives	
Frank G. Clement	Dickson County High School	Governor of Tennessee	
William J. Crowe Jr.	Classen High School	U, S, Ambassador to the United Kingdom, Chairman of the Joint Chiefs of Staff, and a U.S. Navy admiral	
Steve Daines	Bozeman High School	United States Senator and U.S. House of Representative	
Diana DeGette	South High School	U.S. House of Representative	
Russ Feingold	Joseph A. Craig High School	United States Senator, Wisconsin Senate, and U.S. Special Envoy for the African Great Lakes and the Congo-Kinshasa	
Peggy Flanagan	St. Louis Park High School	50th Lieutenant Governor of Minnesota	
Bob Graham	Miami Carol City High School	Governor of Florida and United States Senator	
Thamar Harrigan	North Miami Beach Senior High School	White House Chief of Staff and White House Liaison of the U.S. Trade and Development Agency	
Megan Jones	Spencer High School	Iowa House of Representatives	
Colin Kahl	John F. Kennedy High School	Under Secretary of Defense for Policy and national security advisor to the vice president und	
Kevin Kiley	Granite Bay High School	United States House of Representatives and California State Assembly	
Richard Lugar	Shortridge High School	United States Senate	
Michael McFaul	Bozeman High School	United States Ambassador to Russia	
Tom Ridge	Cathedral Preparatory School	Governor of Pennsylvania and the first United States Secretary of Homeland Security	
Karl Rove	Olympus High School	White House Deputy Chief of Staff for Policy and Senior Advisor to the President	
Robert Rubin	Miami Beach High School	70th U.S. Secretary of the Treasury	
Terri Sewell	Selma High School	United States House of Representatives	
Jake Sullivan	Southwest High School	U.S. National Security Advisor	
Megan Srinivas	Fort Dodge High School	Iowa House of Representatives	
Elizabeth Warren	Northwest Classen High School	United States Senate	
John Wertheim		Chairman of the Democratic Party of New Mexico and political candidate	
Paul Wesselhoft		Oklahoma House of Representatives	
