= PMAG =

PMAG can refer to:

- Presidential Management Alumni Group, non-profit organization
- Provisional Military Advisory Group, original name of the Korean Military Advisory Group
- A line of polymer rifle magazines manufactured by Magpul Industries
