= Sklansky =

Sklansky is a surname. Notable people with the surname include:

- David Sklansky (1947–2026), American poker player and writer
- David Alan Sklansky, American lawyer
