= Hutton Honors College =

Honors program of Indiana University Bloomington

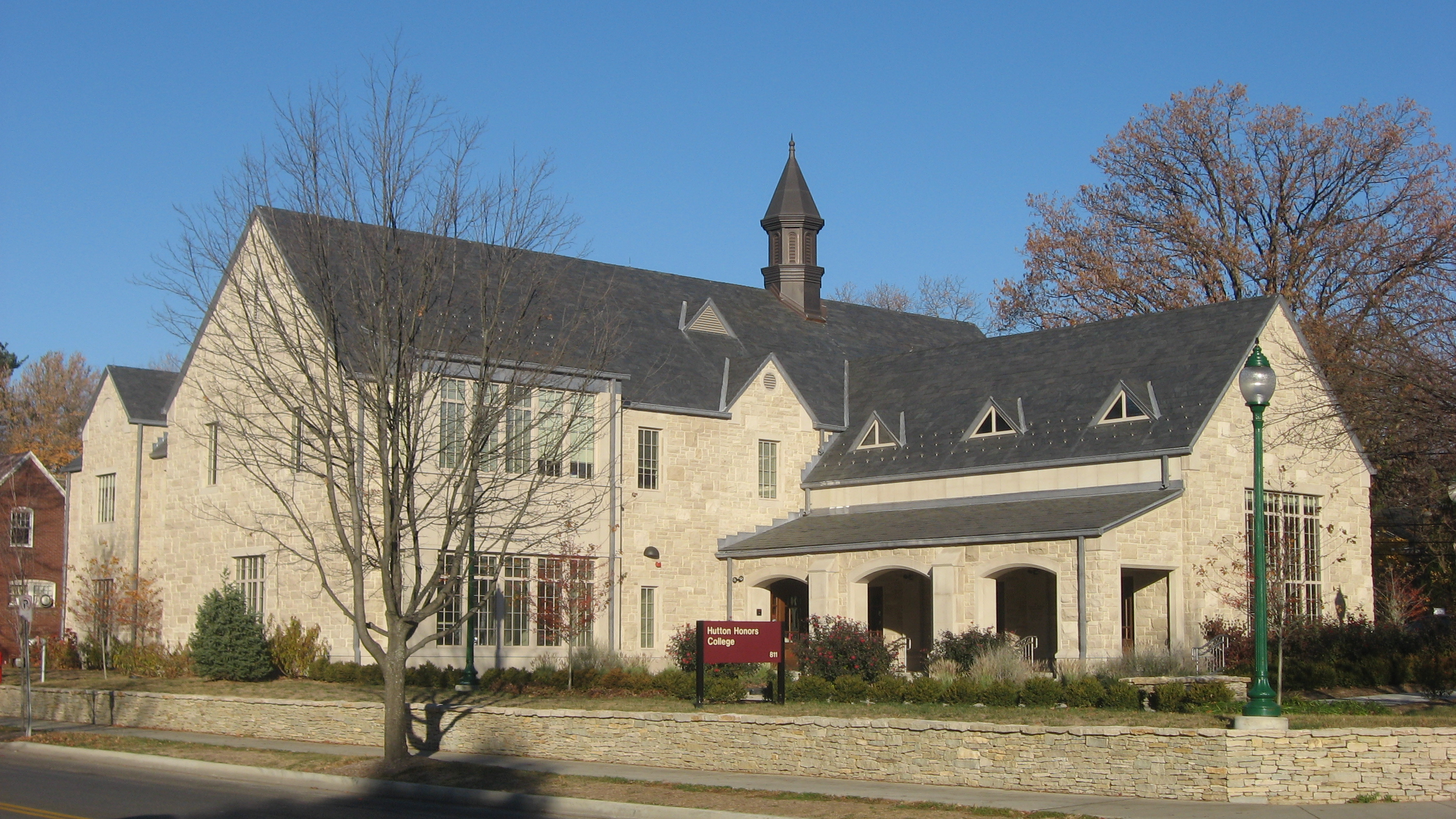
- Type: Public
- Established: 1966
- Parent institution: Indiana University Bloomington
- Dean: Rebecca L. Spang (Interim)
- Location: 811 E 7th St, Bloomington, Indiana, United States; 39.168769°N 86.524030°W
- Website: hutton.indiana.edu

The Hutton Honors College (or simply Hutton or HHC) is the honors college of Indiana University Bloomington. The college was founded as the University Honors Division in 1966 with Warner Chapman as its director. It was renamed the Hutton Honors College in the fall of 2004 in honor of IU alumnus Edward L. Hutton. Its purpose serves to bring together students of various disciplines in an intellectually engaging manner, through research, creative projects, seminars, extracurricular activities, rigorous academics, travel abroad, and internships. It is ranked amongst the top honors colleges in the United States.

== Honors seminars ==
Seminars conducted by the Hutton Honors College allow students to map their General Education requirements into smaller, discussion-based seminars that range between 12 and 25 students per section.

== School and departmental honors ==
Individual schools and departments on the IU Bloomington campus also offer additional programming for high-achieving students. These are also noted on a student's transcript and diploma, with many pursuing both the Hutton Honors Notation and Departmental Honors.

== Study abroad programs ==
=== Hutton International Experiences Program (HIEP) ===
As of 2025, 2 in 3 HHC students studied abroad while pursuing studies at IU Bloomington.

In the 2024–25 school year, the HHC conducted 13 study abroad programs across winter break, spring break and summer.

== Student life ==
=== Honors Residential Communities (HRCs) ===
Honors Residential Communities are academically oriented living environments. Students can take selected honors seminars at the residence center. As of 2025, HRCs are available in selected floors for the following on-campus accommodations:

- Briscoe Quadrangle (Single/Double with Private Bathroom)
- Teter Quadrangle (Single/Double with Academic Support Center)
- Forest Quadrangle (Single/Double with Dining Hall)
- Cedar Hall, Union Street Center (Apartment-syled, for upperclassmen only)

=== Student organizations ===
As of 2025, the Hutton Honors College supports 9 student organizations who assist with extracurricular programming, professional development, philanthropy and student leadership on campus:

- Autism Mentoring Program (AMP)
- HHart
- Honors Bloomington Outreach (HBO)
- Honors Student Organization (HSO)
- Honorvol
- Hutton Ambassadors
- Hutton Honors College Dean's Advisory Board (DAB)
- Hutton Honors Council Association (HHCA)
- Hutton New Generation Leaders Association

== Historical timeline ==
- May 1965: The IU Board of Trustees approves “in principle” the establishment of an Honors Division.
- 1966: The University Honors Division, with Warner Chapman as its director, is established as a unit within the Office for Undergraduate Development. Within a few years, the Honors Division begins to report to the chancellor of the campus. The “first home” of the University Honors Division is Professor Chapman's office, Kirkwood Hall 113.
- 1973-1986: The University Honors Division is housed in the Student Building.
- 1984-85: Julia Conaway Bondanella, associate director of the University Honors Division, serves as acting director. Professor Bondanella serves as associate director of the University Honors Division from 1983 to 2000 and associate dean of the IU Honors College 2000–01. She was also elected president of the National Collegiate Honors Council from 1993 to 1994.
- Fall 1985: James S. Ackerman, professor of religious studies and former chair of that department, becomes director of the University Honors Division. The first Honors Division merit scholarship recipients matriculate.
- Spring 1986: The University Honors Division moves into Haskett House, 324 N. Jordan Ave. A converted garage in Haskett called the Brown County Room serves in the coming years as space to welcome students, faculty, and distinguished campus visitors for extracurricular events.
- Early 1990s: The University Honors Division offers its students the opportunity to earn an Honors Notation in recognition of the completion of honors-level coursework in several departments.
- Spring 1993: The University Honors Division is given the use of Moody House, 326 N. Jordan Ave., for its advising staff; the offices of other HD administrators remain in 324 N. Jordan Ave.
- August 1993: James Ackerman retires; Lewis H. Miller Jr., professor of English and co-founder of the Liberal Arts and Management Program, becomes director of the University Honors Division.
- 1999: The University Honors Division establishes an Honors Residential Community in Forest Quadrangle.
- 2000: The University Honors Division becomes the Honors College and Lewis Miller is named dean.
- Summer 2002: Edward Gubar, the Honors College director of publications and of grants and a faculty member in the HC and the IU School of Journalism, serves as acting dean.
- August 2002: Karen Hanson, chair of the Department of Philosophy and the Rudy Professor of Philosophy, is named dean of the Honors College.
- Late Fall 2004: The Honors College is named the Hutton Honors College, in honor of IU alumnus, business leader, and philanthropist Edward L. Hutton.
- August 2007: Jean Robinson, professor of political science, serves as interim dean.
- July 2008: Matthew Auer is named dean of the HHC.
- January 2008: The new 15,000-square-foot (1,400 m^{2}) Hutton Honors College building opens, made possible by the generosity of Edward L. Hutton.
