= Colleen Hartman =

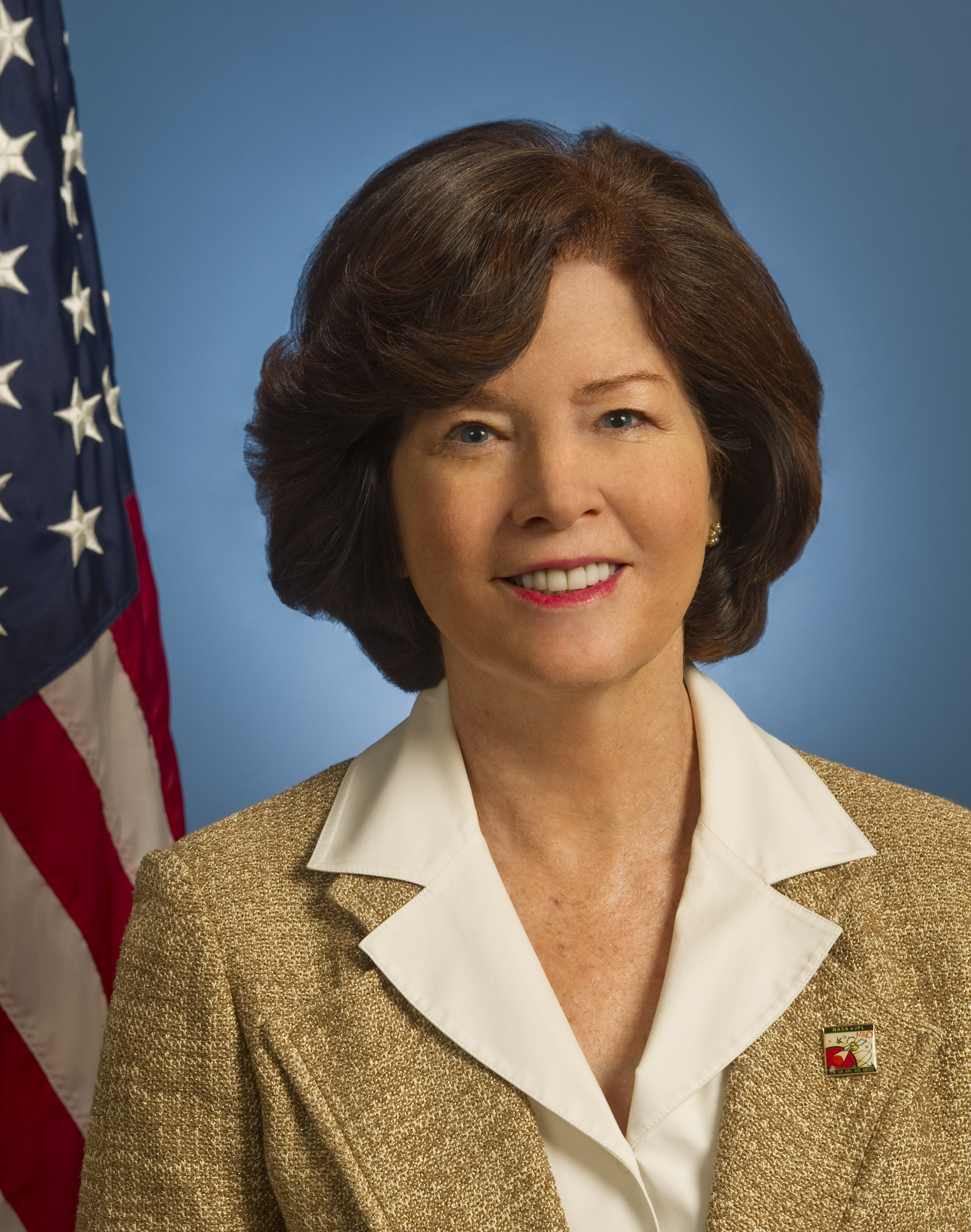
Colleen Hartman - Official NASA Photo

Colleen Hartman is currently the Board Director for the Space Studies Board as well as the Aeronautics and Space Engineering Board of the National Academies of Sciences, Engineering, and Medicine in Washington, D.C. She was the deputy center director for Science, Operations and Performance of NASA’s Goddard Space Flight Center and most recently, was the Director of the Science and Exploration Directorate (Code 600). Previously she was acting Associate Administrator of the Science Mission Directorate (SMD), Deputy AA of SMD and presidential management intern, served as a senior policy analyst at the White House Office of Science and Technology Policy, and served as deputy division director for technology at NASA Headquarters.

Hartman earned a bachelor's degree in zoology from Pomona College in Claremont, Calif., a master's in public administration from the University of Southern California, and a master's, as well as a doctorate, in physics from the Catholic University of America in Washington.

Hartman has spoken both domestically and internationally at many press events, including serving as the NASA press interface for many outer planets missions and launches. Her awards include two of the prestigious Presidential Rank Award of Meritorious Senior Executive, the NASA Outstanding Performance Award, the Claire Booth Luce Fellowship in Science and Engineering, and the Hugh L. Dryden Memorial Space Club Award, and multiple NASA awards.

== History ==
Hartman has served in various senior positions throughout the government, including as acting associate administrator and as the deputy associate administrator at NASA's Science Mission Directorate and as the deputy assistant administrator at the National Oceanic and Atmospheric Administration. Hartman was professor of space policy and international affairs at the George Washington University's Elliott School of International Affairs in Washington and continues to serve as an adjunct professor. As division director for NASA's planetary missions, Hartman was instrumental in developing innovative approaches to powering space probes destined for the farthest reaches of the Solar System, including in-space propulsion and nuclear power and propulsion. While at NASA Headquarters, she spearheaded the selection process for the New Horizons probe to Pluto. She also gained administration and congressional approval for an entirely new class of funded missions that are competitively selected called "New Frontiers," to explore the planets, asteroids and comets in the Solar System.

After beginning her government career as a presidential management intern, she worked on Capitol Hill, as a senior engineer at NASA Goddard, as a senior policy analyst at the White House Office of Science and Technology Policy, and as deputy division director for technology at NASA Headquarters. Hartman has built and launched scientific balloon payloads, worked on robotic vision, overseen the development of the command and data handling systems for a variety of Earth-observing spacecraft, and served as NASA program manager for dozens of missions including the Cosmic Background Explorer. Data from the COBE spacecraft gained two NASA-sponsored scientists the Nobel Prize in physics in 2006.
