= Mara Wilson =

American actress (born 1987)

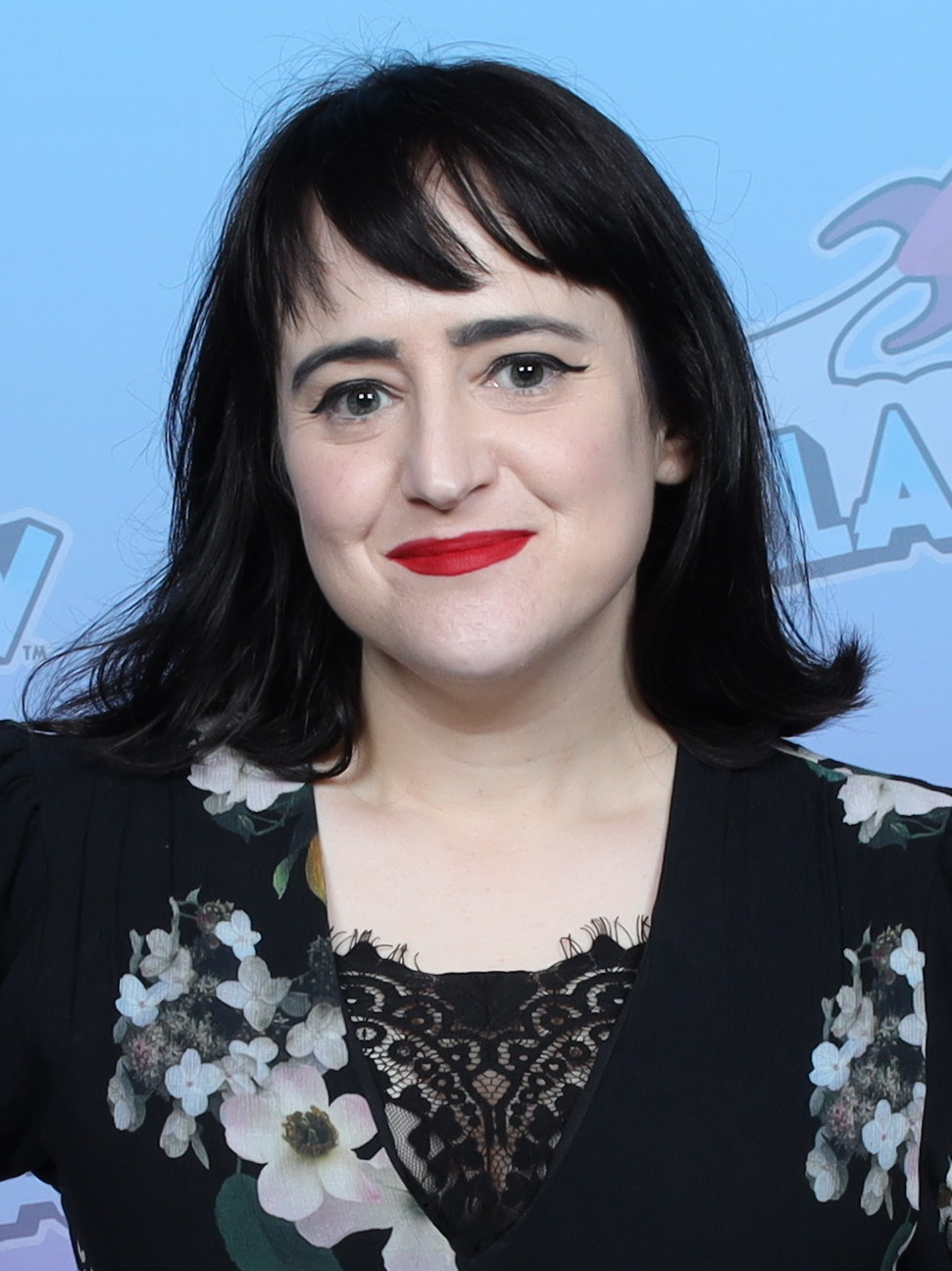
- Wilson in 2024
- Born: Mara Elizabeth Wilson; July 24, 1987 (age 39); Burbank, California, U.S.
- Education: New York University (BFA)
- Occupation: Actress
- Years active: 1993–2000, 2012–present
- Relatives: Ben Shapiro (cousin)

Mara Elizabeth Wilson (born July 24, 1987) is an American actress. As a child, she played Natalie Hillard in Mrs. Doubtfire (1993), Susan Walker in Miracle on 34th Street (1994), the titular character in Matilda (1996), and Annabel Greening in A Simple Wish (1997). Following her role as Lily in Thomas and the Magic Railroad (2000), Wilson took a 12-year hiatus from acting to focus on school and writing. She returned to acting in 2012 and has predominantly worked in web series.

== Early life ==
Mara Elizabeth Wilson was born on July 24, 1987, in Burbank, California, the fourth child of Burbank PTA school volunteer Suzie (née Shapiro) and KTLA broadcast engineer Mike Wilson. Her mother was Jewish, while her father is a Catholic of Irish descent.

Wilson's mother, Suzie, was diagnosed with breast cancer on March 10, 1995, and died on April 26, 1996, when Wilson was eight years old. The film Matilda was dedicated to her memory. Wilson credits Danny DeVito for being very caring and comforting during this time. Wilson later recalled that this affected her interest in acting. At age 12, Wilson was diagnosed with obsessive–compulsive disorder. She has also been diagnosed with attention deficit hyperactivity disorder. Wilson attended John Burroughs High School and then transferred to Idyllwild Arts Academy. After graduation in 2005, she relocated to New York City to continue her studies at New York University's Tisch School of the Arts, graduating in 2009. Wilson appeared in her own one-woman show called Weren't You That Girl? while in college.

== Career ==
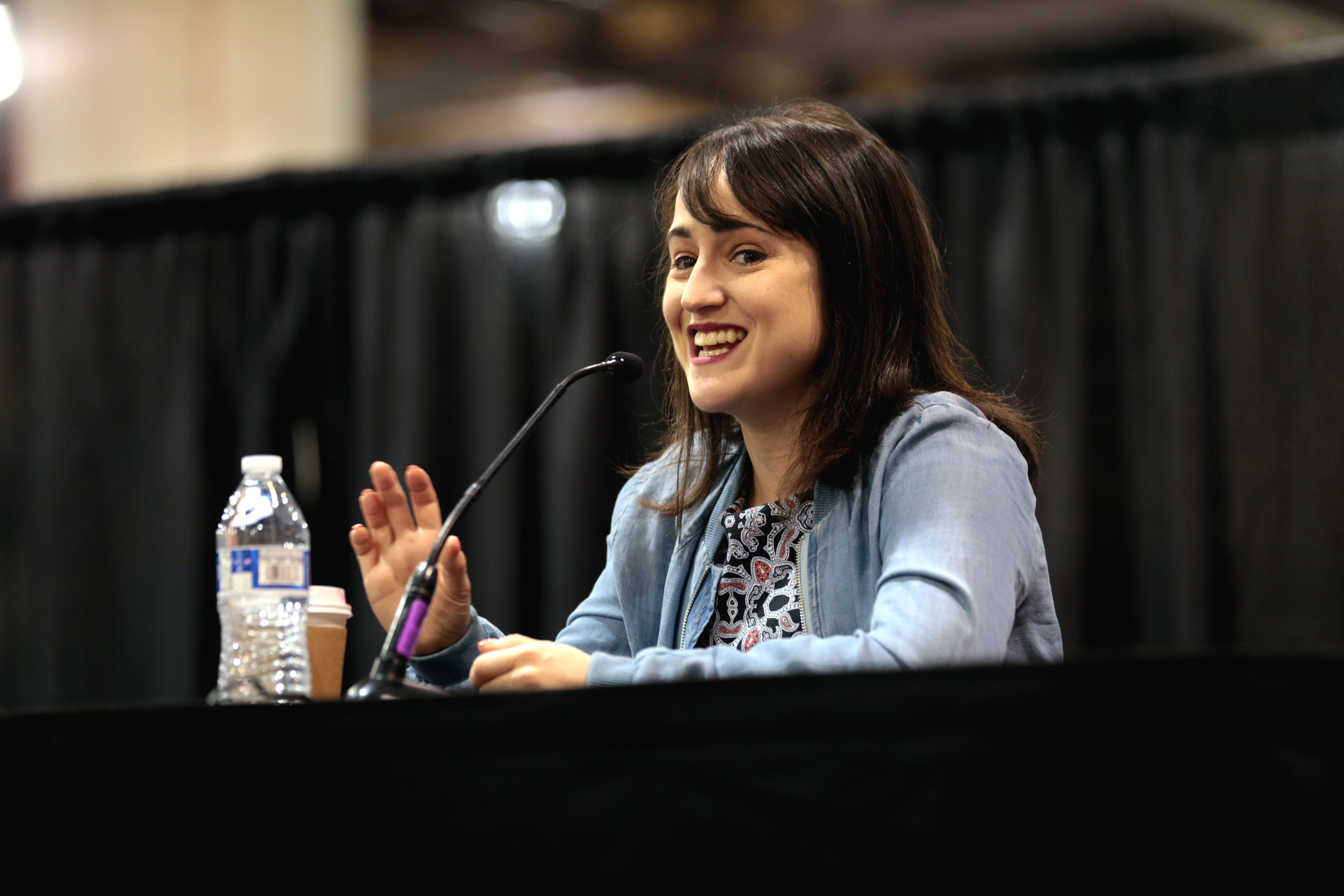
Wilson in 2017

When she was five years old, she became interested in acting after watching her older brother Danny appear in television commercials. Wilson's parents were initially opposed, but after appearing in several commercials for businesses, Wilson was invited to audition for the 1993 comedy film Mrs. Doubtfire. Producers cast Wilson in the role of Natalie Hillard. The following year, she appeared in a remake of Miracle on 34th Street.

Wilson sang "Make 'Em Laugh" at the 67th Academy Awards broadcast on March 27, 1995, with Tim Curry and Kathy Najimy. In 1995, Wilson won the ShoWest Award for Young Star of the Year.

Wilson's film work caught the attention of Danny DeVito, and she was cast as the protagonist Matilda Wormwood in the 1996 film Matilda. She was nine years old at the time. Wilson was nominated for three awards for her performance, winning the YoungStar Award for Best Performance by a Young Actress in a Comedy Film.

In 1997, Wilson starred in A Simple Wish alongside Martin Short. Although she was nominated for three awards again, the film mostly received negative reviews by critics.

In 1997, Wilson went to a table reading for What Dreams May Come starring Robin Williams, but she did not get the part. A year later, Wilson auditioned for the 1998 remake of Disney's The Parent Trap, but the role was given to Lindsay Lohan after Wilson was deemed too young. In 1999, she portrayed Willow Johnson in the film for The Wonderful World of Disney titled Balloon Farm.

In 2000, Wilson appeared in the fantasy film Thomas and the Magic Railroad, her last film to date. The film was panned by critics and performed poorly at the box office. Wilson retired from film acting shortly afterwards. She received a script for the 2001 film Donnie Darko but declined to audition.

Wilson's theater credits include A Midsummer Night's Dream and Cinderella. She starred in her own live shows Weren't You That Girl? and What Are You Afraid Of?

In 2012, Wilson appeared briefly in one episode of the web series Missed Connection in the role of Bitty, and made special appearances on internet review shows for That Guy with the Glasses, including a comedic turn playing an adult Matilda during a review of Matilda by the Nostalgia Chick, Lindsay Ellis. That year, Wilson explained why she quit film acting: "Film acting is not very fun. Doing the same thing over and over again until, in the director's eyes, you 'get it right', does not allow for very much creative freedom. The best times I had on film sets were the times the director let me express myself, but those were rare."

In 2012, Wilson started publishing online writing at a blog called "Mara Wilson Writes Stuff", where, in 2014 after the death of Robin Williams, she shared her memories of working with him. In 2018, Wilson moved to Substack with a blog called "Shan't We Call the Vicar."

In April 2013, Wilson attended and shared her impressions of the Broadway production of Matilda the Musical. A month later, Wilson wrote an article for Cracked.com, offering her opinion of the delinquency of some former child stars. Her play Sheeple was produced in 2013 for the New York International Fringe Festival. In an interview that December, Wilson stated that her film acting days are over, and that she is instead focusing on writing. Wilson's book Where Am I Now?: True Stories of Girlhood and Accidental Fame was published on September 13, 2016.

Wilson had a recurring role on the podcast Welcome to Night Vale as "The Faceless Old Woman Who Secretly Lives in Your Home", as well as her own storytelling show called What Are You Afraid Of?. In 2016, Wilson made a brief return to film acting in a Mrs. Doubtfire-inspired episode of Broad City, in which she played a waitress where the comical Heimlich scene from the film was re-enacted. That same year, Wilson voiced Jill Pill, a writer/director anthropomorphic spider, in season 3 of BoJack Horseman. Wilson voiced Liv Amara and her clone, Diane Amara, in Big Hero 6: The Series.

In a 2017 NPR interview, The Simpsons voice actress Nancy Cartwright stated that a young Wilson was the inspiration for a character's voice on the episode "Bart Sells His Soul".

In 2019, the American Humanist Association awarded Wilson the LGBTQ Humanist Award.

In 2020, Wilson discussed her childhood acting experiences in the HBO documentary Showbiz Kids.

In May 2024, she reunited with Mrs. Doubtfire cast members Lisa Jakub and Matthew Lawrence for a joint podcast appearance. They had also reunited in 2018 together with Pierce Brosnan on the Today Show to mark the film's 25th anniversary.

In 2025, Wilson won a collective Audie Award for her contributions to Chuck Tingle's Bury Your Gays. Since retiring from acting, Mara Wilson has gone on to do voice acting and narrating audio books.

== Charity work ==
In 2015, Wilson collaborated with Project UROK, a nonprofit organization whose mission is to aid teens with mental illness. She is a supporter of those with endometriosis. In 2025, Wilson attended the Blossom Ball, a benefit night for endometriosis awareness and research. She is also an ambassador and advocate for the L. A. Dysautonomia Network, a Pasadena-based nonprofit.

== Personal life ==
Wilson has three older brothers and a younger sister. She is a cousin of political commentator and media host Ben Shapiro, whom Wilson has disavowed due to his conservative views and her left-wing views; the two have no contact with each other. Wilson was raised Jewish, but became an atheist at age 15. In a 2020 interview, Wilson described herself as an agnostic. Three years later, she participated in an online discussion with Rabbi Danya Ruttenberg for the 92nd Street Y. Mara is allergic to nickel.

In 2014, Wilson was working for Publicolor, a New York City-based nonprofit organization involved in repainting public schools.

In 2015, Wilson appeared in a video by the mental health charity Project UROK in which she discussed the mental illnesses she has experienced, including anxiety, depression, and obsessive–compulsive disorder. Wilson discussed her history of mental illness on Paul Gilmartin's podcast The Mental Illness Happy Hour.

Wilson first came out as bisexual in June 2016, in the aftermath of the Pulse nightclub shooting in Orlando, Florida. Wilson referred to herself as bisexual and queer during an interview with Medium in September 2017. In a 2017 op-ed in Elle magazine, Wilson defended the then-13-year-old actress Millie Bobby Brown after commentators sexualized Brown's public image. In a 2021 op-ed in The New York Times, Wilson commented on the documentary Framing Britney Spears and the parallels between her own life as a child star and Britney Spears's. Wilson recalled an incident in which she was asked to comment on the burgeoning sexuality of an 18-year-old Spears when she herself was barely 13, and expressed relief at largely escaping oversexualization of her public image compared to Spears. Wilson described her disappointment when a reporter called her a "spoiled brat" after she stated that she wanted the day off on her 13th birthday instead of granting interviews.

In 2016, Wilson resided in the Queens borough of New York City. She later moved back to California. Mara Wilson suffers from endometriosis and Postural orthostatic tachycardia syndrome.

== Filmography ==
=== Film ===
Year	Title	Role	Notes
1993	Mrs. Doubtfire	Natalie "Nattie" Hillard	
1994	Miracle on 34th Street	Susan Walker	
1996	Matilda	Matilda Wormwood	
1997	A Simple Wish	Anabel Greening	
2000	Thomas and the Magic Railroad	Lily Stone	
2015	Billie Bob Joe	Herself	
2021	Pre-Emptive Defence	Sara	Short film
2026	Floored	Jane	Short film, Comedy

=== Television ===
Year	Title	Role	Notes
1993	Bob	Amelia	Episode: "Have Yourself a Married Little Christmas"
1993	Melrose Place	Nicole "Nikki" Petrova	5 episodes
1994	A Time to Heal	Barbara Barton	Television film
1996	Pearl	Samantha Stein	Episode: "The Tutor"
1999	Balloon Farm	Willow Johnson	Television film
1999	Batman Beyond	Tamara Caulder	Voice; episode: "Mind Games"
2016	Broad City	Waitress	Episode: "Burning Bridges"
2016	BoJack Horseman	Jill Pill	Voice; 4 episodes
2018–2019	Big Hero 6: The Series	Liv Amara / Diane "Di" Amara	Voice; recurring role
2026	They'll Love It	Racheal	Guest Role, 5 episodes

=== Web ===
Year	Title	Role	Notes
2012	Nostalgia Critic	Herself	Episode: "A Simple Wish"
2012	Shut Up and Talk	Herself	Episode: "Guest: Mara Wilson"
2012	Demo Reel	Donnie DuPre's wife	Voice; episode: "Lost in Translation (Bromance Version)"
2012	Missed Connection	Bitty	Episode: "Bad Dates"
2012, 2014	Nostalgia Chick	Herself	Episodes: "Matilda" and "Nostalgic Foods of Yore", also writer
2013	Welcome to Night Vale	Faceless Old Woman	Voice; 10 episodes
2014	Keith and The Girl	Herself	Episodes: "2002: Boobs" and "2147: Gang Dick"
2014	Amy Poehler's Smart Girls	Herself	Episode: "The In Too Steep Tea Party"
2014	Maven of the Eventide	Herself	Pumpktoberfest Vlogs, Episodes 5 & 12
2014, 2015, 2017	I Don't Even Own a Television	Herself	Episodes: "016 — Covert Conception (w/ Mara Wilson)", "026: Treacherous Love (w/ Mara Wilson)", "081: I'm With the Band (w/ Mara Wilson)"
2015	Gilmore Guys	Herself	Episode 4.21
2015	That's the Show with Danny	Herself	Episode: "117: The One with Mara Wilson"
2016	Mouth Time with Reductress	Ruth Hrorgen	Mouth Time LIVE! With Mara Wilson
2019	Passenger List	—N/a	Writer of "Cyberspace" (episode 5)
2020	Helluva Boss	Mrs. Mayberry	Voice; episode: "Murder Family"
2020	Our Popcorn Movie Dystopia - Some More News: The Movie	Matilda Cody	Web film
2020	The George Lucas Talk Show	Herself	May the AR Be LI$$ You Arli$$ marathon fundraiser; The George Lucas Holiday Special
2021	You Are Good	Herself	Episode: "Hocus Pocus with Mara Wilson"
2022, 2023	Ollie & Scoops	Claudia Grimson	Voice; 2 episodes

=== Audio ===
Year	Title	Role	Notes
2016	Where Am I Now?	Narrator	Audiobook of her own autobiography
2020	The Faceless Old Woman Who Secretly Lives in Your Home	Narrator	Spin-off from Night Vale Presents, created by Joseph Fink and Jeffrey Cranor
2022	They Drown Our Daughters	Narrator	Audiobook of Katrina Monroe's novel
2023	Unleashed Holiday	Narrator	Audiobook of Victoria Schade's novel
2023	Do Not Open	Narrator	Audiobook of Kiersten Modglin's novel
2023	For Never & Always	Narrator	Audiobook of Helena Greer's novel
2023	Scorched Grace	Narrator	Audiobook of Margot Douaihy's novel
2023	Dykes To Watch Out For	Heloise	Audible Original based on the weekly comic strip by Alison Bechdel
2024	Blessed Water	Narrator	Audiobook of Margot Douaihy's novel
2024	Bury Your Gays	Narrator	Audiobook of Chuck Tingle's novel
2024	Diary of a Dying Girl	Narrator	Audiobook of Mallory Smith's book
2024	Bright and Tender Dark	Narrator	Audiobook of Joanna Pearson's novel
2024	Keep This Off the Record	Narrator	Audiobook of Arden Joy's book
2024	Bad Best Friend	Narrator	Audiobook of Rachel Vail's book
2024	The Z Word	Narrator	Audiobook of Lindsay King-Miller's novel
2024	Nora Ephron at the Movies	Narrator	Audiobook of Ilana Kaplan's book
2024	Through the Midnight Door	Narrator	Audiobook of Katrina Monroe's novel
2024	When We Flew Away	Narrator	Audiobook of Alice Hoffman's novel
2024–2025	VAM PD	Jane	Main cast, 6 episodes
2025	Finder's Keepers	Narrator	Audiobook of Sarah Adler's novel
2025	The Unexpected Consequence of Bleeding on a Tuesday	Narrator	Audiobook of Kelsey B. Toney's novel
2025	Fairy Godmother: An Enchanters Tale	Narrator	Audiobook of Jen Calonita's book
2025	Lucky Day	Narrator	Audiobook of Chuck Tingle's novel
2025	Maine Characters	Narrator	Audiobook of Hannah Orenstein's novel
2026	Wombat Waiting	Narrator	Audiobook of Katherine Applegate's book

=== Stage roles ===
- A Midsummer Night's Dream (2004)
- Cinderella (2005)
- Weren't You That Girl? (2009)
- What Are You Afraid Of? (2014)

== Bibliography ==
- Sheeple (play, 2013)
- Where Am I Now?: True Stories of Girlhood and Accidental Fame (2016)
- Good Girls Don't (2023)

== Awards and nominations ==
Year	Organization	Award	Work	Result
1995	ShoWest Awards	Young Star of the Year	—N/a	Won
1996	YoungStar Award	Best Performance by a Young Actress in a Comedy Film	Matilda	Won
1996	Young Artist Award	Best Performance in a Feature Film — Leading Young Actress	Matilda	Nominated
1996	Saturn Awards	Best Performance by a Younger Actor	Matilda	Nominated
1997	YoungStar Award	Best Performance by a Young Actress in a Comedy Film	A Simple Wish	Nominated
1997	Young Artist Award	Best Performance in a Feature Film — Leading Young Actress	A Simple Wish	Won
1997	Saturn Awards	Best Performance by a Younger Actor	A Simple Wish	Nominated
2000	YoungStar Award	Best Young Actress in a Comedy Film	Thomas and the Magic Railroad	Nominated
2000	Young Artist Award	Best Performance in a Feature Film — Leading Young Actress	Thomas and the Magic Railroad	Nominated
