= Alan Thomas (cricketer) =

English cricketer

Personal information
- Full name: Alan Thomas
- Born: 7 January 1947 (age 79); Bolton, Lancashire, England
- Batting: Right-handed
- Bowling: Right-arm off break

Domestic team information
- Years: Team
- 1966: Lancashire

Career statistics
Competition	First-class
Matches	1
Runs scored	4
Batting average	2.00
100s/50s	–/–
Top score	4
Balls bowled	48
Wickets	–
Bowling average	–
5 wickets in innings	–
10 wickets in match	–
Best bowling	–
Catches/stumpings	–/–
- Source: Cricinfo, 16 June 2012

Alan Thomas (born 7 January 1947) is a former English cricketer. Thomas was a right-handed batsman who bowled right-arm off break. He was born at Bolton, Lancashire.

Thomas made a single first-class appearance for Lancashire against Oxford University at the University Parks in 1966. Oxford University won the toss and elected to bat first, making 241 all out in their first-innings, during which Thomas bowled eight overs without taking a wicket, though he only conceded 7 runs. Lancashire then made 203 all out in their first-innings, during which Thomas was dismissed for 4 runs by Richard Elviss. In response, Oxford University reached 224/8 declared in their second-innings, leaving Lancashire with a target of 262 for victory. However, they could only make 191 all out in their second-innings, during which Thomas was dismissed for a duck by Elviss. This was his only major appearance for Lancashire.
