= Margot Douaihy =

American writer

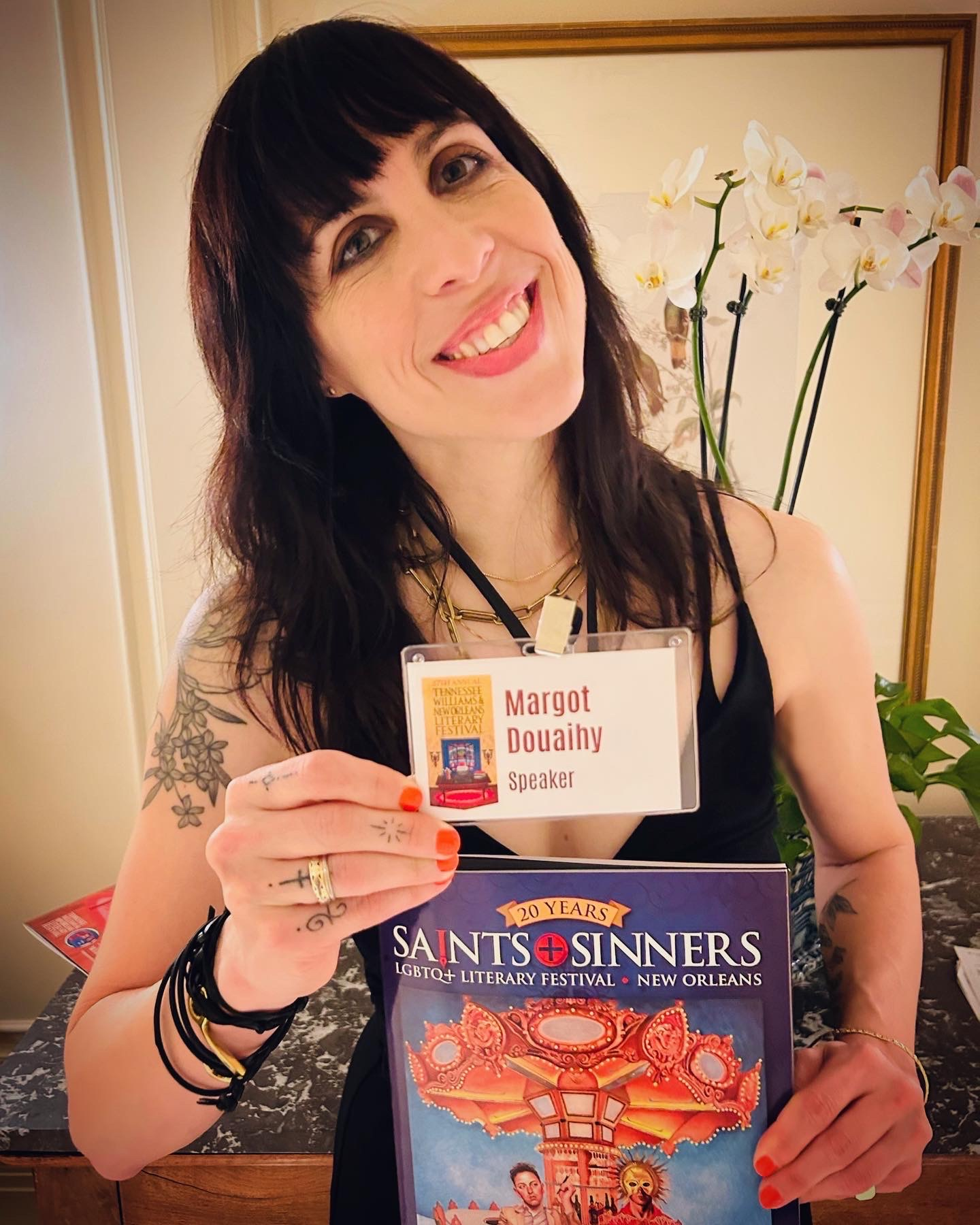
- Margot Douaihy at the New Orleans Saints & Sinners LGBTQ+ Literary Festival in New Orleans (2023)
- Born: Pennsylvania, U.S.
- Occupations: Novelist; poet
- Writing career
- Period: 2013–present
- Genre: Mystery
- Notable work: Scorched Grace

Margot Douaihy (/ˈmɑːrɡoʊ duːˈwaɪhiː/) is an American mystery novelist and poet. She was a Lambda Literary Award finalist for her poetry collection Girls Like You, and her mysteries have been named as one of the Best Novels of the Year by The New York Times and other publications.

== Career ==
She received the 2019 Sisters in Crime Academic Research Grant. In 2023 she received the F. Lammot Belin Foundation Arts Scholarship.

Douaihy's Bandit/Queen: The Runaway Story of Belle Starr (2022) and Scranton Lace (2018) are documentary poetry projects centering themes of queerness, abandoned structures and institutions, feminist becoming, and class tensions.

Douaihy is a co-editor of the Cambridge University Press Elements in Crime Narratives series. Her writing has been featured in The Tahoma Literary Review, The Petigru Review, Petrichor, and The Adirondack Review.

She has taught at Marywood University, Franklin Pierce University, and Emerson College. She is an assistant professor in the School of Arts and Interdisciplinary Studies at Emerson College in Boston.

=== Sister Holiday mystery series ===
Douaihy's debut novel, Scorched Grace: A Sister Holiday Mystery, was published by Gillian Flynn Books in 2023. It is a crime mystery novel that follows "Sister Holiday, a chain-smoking, heavily tattooed, queer nun, [who] puts her amateur sleuthing skills to the test." The novel was the first to be published under Gillian Flynn's imprint; Flynn called the novel "a sneaky, dark thriller and a character study in a freight train of a murder mystery." Scorched Grace was published in French with HarperCollins France and in the UK with Pushkin Vertigo. The Sister Holiday audiobooks are narrated by Mara Wilson.

Scorched Grace received numerous accolades, including a starred review by Publishers Weekly, which called it a "stunning fiction debut [...] briskly plotted master class in character development." Scorched Grace was twice recognized by The New York Times, as a New York Times Book Review Editors’ Choice and as a New York Times Best Crime Novel of the Year for 2023. The Guardian twice recognized Scorched Grace as one of the best crime and thriller novels of 2023.

The sequel to Scorched Grace, titled Blessed Water: A Sister Holiday Mystery (Gillian Flynn Books, 2024), follows Sister Holiday on a second investigation in New Orleans beginning with the discovery of the body of a priest floating in the Mississippi River. Following its release in March 2024, Blessed Water received praise from several media outlets and writers organizations. The Center for Fiction described the book as "a literary treat". The Times described the book as "powerful," noting that it "plumbs the depth of human cruelty." Publishers Weekly described Blessed Water as a "deliriously enjoyable, relentlessly plotted adventure" noting that the Sister Holiday series "continues to impress". Blessed Water was named one of the New York Times Best Crime Novels of 2024.

A third installment in the mystery series, Divine Ruin, was published in January 2026. Gillian Flynn calls the novel "fearlessly inspired." A starred review by Publishers Weekly called it a "crackling third installment". Divine Ruin was named a January 2026 Indie Next selection by the American Booksellers Association.

== Publications ==
=== Novels ===
- Scorched Grace: A Sister Holiday Mystery. Gillian Flynn Books. 2023. ISBN 9781638930242.
- Blessed Water: A Sister Holiday Mystery. Gillian Flynn Books. 2024. ISBN 9781638930266.
- Divine Ruin: A Sister Holiday Mystery. Gillian Flynn Books. 2026. ISBN 9781638931980.

=== Poetry ===
- I Would Ruby If I Could. Factory Hollow Press. 2013.
- Girls Like You. Clemson University Press. 2015. ISBN 978-0-9908958-2-4.
- Scranton Lace. Illustrated by Bri Hermanson. Clemson University Press. 2017. ISBN 978-1942954477.
- Bandit/Queen: The Runaway Story of Belle Starr. Illustrated by Bri Hermanson. Clemson University Press. 2022. ISBN 978-1-949979-78-7.

== Awards and nominations ==
Year	Nominated work	Award	Category	Result	Ref.
2016	Girls Like You	Lambda Literary Award	Lesbian Poetry	Shortlist	
2020	"Don't"	Aesthetica Magazine Creative Writing Prize	Poetry	Shortlist	
2020	"Don't"	Palette Poetry Sappho Prize	—	Shortlist	
2022	"The Murder Hornet"	The Florida Review Humboldt Poetry Prize	—	Shortlist	
2023	Scorched Grace	Pinckley Prize	Debut Fiction	Winner	
2023	Scorched Grace	New England Book Award	Fiction	Shortlist	
2024	Scorched Grace	Crime Writers' Association Dagger Awards	New Blood Dagger	Longlist	
2024	Scorched Grace	Anthony Award	Best First Novel	Shortlist	
2024	Scorched Grace	International Thriller Writers Award	Best First Novel	Shortlist	
2024	Scorched Grace	Left Coast Crime Award	Best Debut Mystery Novel	Shortlist	
2024	Scorched Grace	Macavity Award	Best First Mystery	Shortlist	
2025	Blessed Water	Publishing Triangle Awards	Joseph Hansen Award for LGBTQ Crime Writing	Winner	
2025	Blessed Water	Left Coast Crime Award	Best Mystery Novel	Shortlist	

== Personal life ==
Margot Douaihy was born and raised in Scranton, Pennsylvania, and is of Lebanese ancestry. Douaihy is a queer woman and a longtime advocate for LGBTQ+ inclusion and visibility.

She was raised Maronite Catholic, and attended Catholic school as a child. She noted in 2023 that the church played "a profound influence in my life, but I haven’t practiced regularly in years".

She holds a PhD in creative writing from Lancaster University.

Douaihy lived in New Orleans from 2008 to 2010.
