= Robert G. Berschinski =

American politician

Robert Gardner (Rob) Berschinski is the chief of staff of the Harvard University John F. Kennedy School of Government. He was the Special Assistant to the President and Senior Director for Democracy and Human Rights at the White House National Security Council in the Biden administration. Berschinski served in the Obama Administration as Deputy Assistant Secretary of State in the Bureau of Democracy, Human Rights, and Labor, special assistant to then-Deputy Secretary of Defense Ash Carter at the U.S. Department of Defense, and director for Security and Human Rights Policy at the NSC. He is a former U.S. Air Force officer.

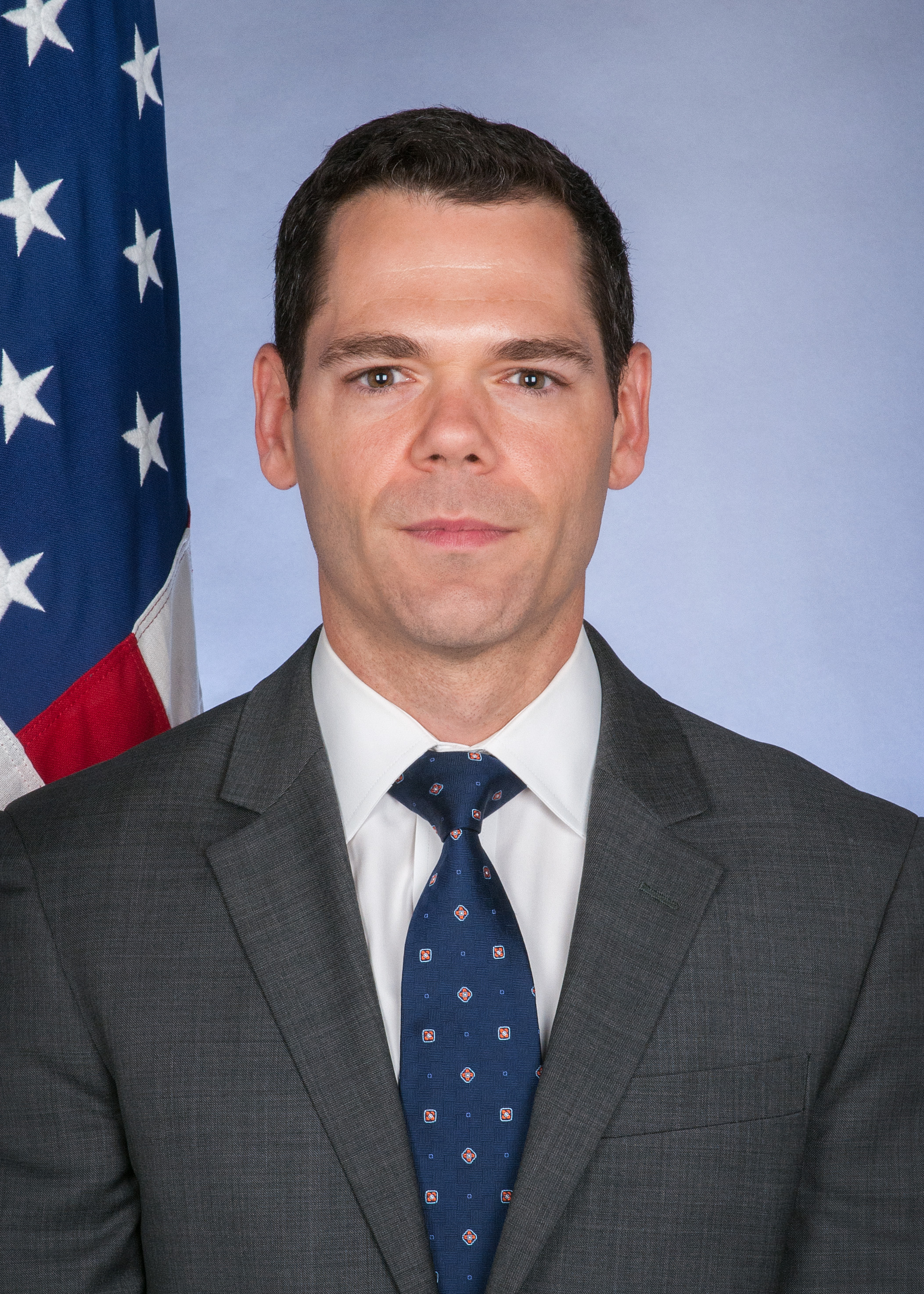
Official portrait

== Early life and education ==
Berschinski was raised in Peachtree City, Georgia and graduated from McIntosh High School. He attended Yale University on a full AFROTC scholarship, graduating cum laude and earning a B.A. in political science.

Following the terrorist attacks of September 11, 2001, political and cultural commentator David Brooks described Berschinski in the New York Times Magazine as "that rarest of creatures, an Ivy League member of the R.O.T.C.," in a column describing efforts to increase post-9/11 participation in AmeriCorps and other forms of national service.

After concluding his service in the Air Force as a captain, Berschinski returned to Yale and earned an M.A. in international relations, graduating as program valedictorian.

== Career ==
Rob Berschinski speaks with Secretary of State John Kerry and human rights activists during the 2016 ministerial meeting of the Organization for Security and Cooperation in Europe (OSCE).

Berschinski served in the U.S. Air Force as an intelligence officer from 2002 to 2006.

He graduated in 2003 from the 315th Training Squadron's intelligence officer's course as class distinguished graduate. His first operational assignment was with the 607th Air Intelligence Squadron at Osan Air Base, Republic of Korea, where he served from 2003 to 2004 as squadron executive officer. From 2004 to 2006 Berschinski was assigned to the 86th Contingency Response Group at Ramstein Air Base, Germany. During this time he deployed to Kigali, Rwanda, and to Ramadi, Iraq, the latter as a member of the Joint Special Operations Command.

Speaking in 2007 about his wartime experience to the Yale Journal of International Affairs, Berschinski noted that he served in Ramadi with an Army special operations unit that conducted raids on members of Al Qaeda in Iraq (the precursor organization to the self-described Islamic State of Iraq and the Levant), and felt that U.S. involvement in the country had little chance of resulting in a stable nation represented by a legitimate government.

In 2008, Berschinski joined the Office of the Under Secretary of Defense for Policy as a Presidential Management Fellow. In 2009, he served as defense fellow on the staff of the United States Senate Appropriations Subcommittee on Defense, helping to author the Department of Defense appropriations bill for fiscal year 2010.

From 2010 to 2013 Berschinski served as the White House National Security Council's Director for Security and Human Rights Policy, working directly under then-Special Assistant to the President Samantha Power. In this role he coordinated U.S. government actions on international humanitarian law issues and conventional weapons treaties, as well as international efforts to end trafficking in persons, eliminate the use of child soldiers, and improve women's participation in matters related to peace and security. He is considered a key architect of Executive Order 13595 on Instituting a National Action Plan on Women, Peace, and Security; and Executive Order 13627 on Strengthening Protections Against Trafficking in Persons in Federal Contracts.

From 2013 to 2014 Berschinski served as a Special Assistant to then-Deputy Secretary of Defense Ash Carter, for which he was awarded the Secretary of Defense Meritorious Civilian Service Award, the second highest career award presented by the Department of Defense. Berschinski returned to working for Power in 2014 in her capacity as U.S. Ambassador to the United Nations, serving as deputy director of the U.S. Mission to the United Nations’ Washington, D.C. office.

On June 1, 2016, Berschinski was appointed as Deputy Assistant Secretary of State in the Bureau of Democracy, Human Rights, and Labor, serving under Assistant Secretary Tom Malinowski. He is responsible for the U.S. government's human rights and democracy promotion efforts in Europe, Central Asia, and South Asia.

Berschinski is the author of the 2007 U.S. Army War College monograph AFRICOM's Dilemma: The "Global War on Terrorism," "Capacity Building," Humanitarianism, and the Future of U.S. Security Policy in Africa. He is a term member at the Council on Foreign Relations and a fellow at the Truman National Security Project.

== Personal life ==
Berschinski is the brother of Dan Berschinski, a former U.S. Army infantry officer who lost both his legs in an IED attack while serving as a rifle platoon leader in the Arghandab District outside of Kandahar, Afghanistan on August 18, 2009. He is married to Dr. Sabrina Howell, an Assistant Professor of Finance at New York University's Stern School of Business.
