= Matthew Auer =

American academic

Dean of University of Georgia School of Public and International Affairs
- Incumbent
- Assumed office July 1, 2017

Dean of Faculty of Bates College
- In office July 1, 2013 – July 1, 2017

Personal details
- Born: Matthew R. Auer
- Spouse: Anne Auer
- Children: Emma Auer, John Auer
- Education: Harvard University; Tufts University; Yale University
- Occupation: Academic administrator
- Profession: Former dean of the Hutton Honors College of Indiana University
- Website: http://spia.uga.edu/about/dean

Matthew "Matt" R. Auer is an American academic administrator and environmental scholar. Auer served as the dean of faculty and vice president for academic affairs at Bates College in Lewiston, Maine before being appointed the current dean of the University of Georgia School of Public and International Affairs in Athens, Georgia; he assumed office on July 1, 2017.

Auer had also previously served as the Dean of the Hutton Honors College at Indiana University in Bloomington, Indiana, and was a professor at the Indiana University School of Public and Environmental Affairs.

== Early life and education ==
Auer earned an AB in Anthropology, magna cum laude, from Harvard College in 1988, a Master of Arts in Law and Diplomacy from the Fletcher School of Law and Diplomacy, Tufts University, and a Ph.D. in Forestry and Environmental Studies from Yale University in 1996.

== Early educational career ==
He is the former dean of the Hutton Honors College at Indiana University in Bloomington, Indiana. At Indiana University, he taught environmental policy, public policy, and public administration at Indiana University School of Public and Environmental Affairs. At IU, Auer received more than a dozen teaching awards including the President's Award.

== Editorships and academies ==
From 2005 to 2008, he was editor-in-chief of the public policy journal, Policy Sciences, and he has served on the Executive Council of the Society of Policy Scientists. Auer was elected a fellow of the National Academy of Public Administration in 2023.

== U.S. Forest Service ==
Auer served as Senior Adviser to the U.S. Forest Service from 2001 to 2006. During that time, he was a member of the U.S. delegation to the United Nations Forum on Forests and to the International Tropical Timber Council, the governing body of the International Tropical Timber Organization (ITTO). For the United States Agency for International Development and other bilateral aid agencies, he has developed, implemented, and evaluated energy and environmental programs in, among other countries, the Dominican Republic, Mexico, Ecuador, Bolivia, Chile, Estonia, Poland, Azerbaijan, Thailand, Laos, and Vietnam. He has also served as a Presidential Management Fellow at USAID.

== Bates College ==
Auer was appointed dean of faculty and vice president for academic affairs of Bates College on July 1, 2013. At Bates, he oversaw creation of a grant-funded, peer-tutoring hub, a STEM enrichment program, and the largest expansion of the faculty in over a decade. Auer also strengthened computational sciences curricula at the college.

== University of Georgia ==
In early February 2017, the University of Georgia announced that Auer had been named dean of the University of Georgia School of Public and International Affairs. He assumed office on July 1, 2017. Priorities during Auer’s term have included increasing the size of the faculty, new curricula, and theory-to-practice research impact.

== Notable publications ==
- Auer, Matthew. 2021. “Considering Equity in Wildfire Protection,” Sustainability Science, 16: 2163-2169.
- Auer, Matthew, Zhang, Yuman, Lee, Priscilla. 2014. “The Potential of Microblogs for the Study of Public Perceptions of Climate Change,” Wiley Interdisciplinary Reviews: Climate Change, 5: 291-296.
- Auer, Matthew. 2011. “The Policy Sciences of Social Media,” Policy Studies Journal, 39(4): 709-736.
- Auer, Matthew. 2008. “Presidential Environmental Appointees in Comparative Perspective,” Public Administration Review, 68(1): 68-80.
- Auer, Matthew. 2006. “Contexts, Multiple Methods, and Values in the Study of Common-Pool Resources,” Journal of Policy Analysis and Management, 25(1): 215-227.
- Auer, Matthew. 2004. (Ed.) Restoring Cursed Earth: Appraising Environmental Policy Reforms in Eastern Europe and Russia. Lanham, MD: Rowman & Littlefield.
- Auer, Matthew. 2000. “Who Participates in Global Environmental Governance? Partial Answers from International Relations Theory,” Policy Sciences, 33(2): 155-180.
