= Alun Thomas (disambiguation) =

Alun Thomas (1926–1991) was a Welsh rugby union player.

Alun Thomas may also refer to:

- Alun Thomas (bowls) (born 1945), Welsh lawn bowler
- Alun Thomas, musician in The Leg, a Scottish rock band
- Alun Thomas, headmaster at the Britannica International School Shanghai

== See also ==
- Alan Thomas (disambiguation)
