= Balloon Farm (film) =

- DVD cover
- Genre: Fantasy comedy
- Based on: Harvey Potter's Balloon Farm by Jerdine Nolen
- Teleplay by: Steven M. Karczynski
- Directed by: William Dear
- Starring: Rip Torn; Mara Wilson; Roberts Blossom; Fredric Lane; Laurie Metcalf
- Music by: Richard Marvin
- Country of origin: United States
- Original language: English

Production
- Executive producers: John H. Williams; Jesse Kaye; Wesley Moore
- Producer: Kevin Inch
- Cinematography: Rick Bota
- Editor: Edgar Burcksen
- Running time: 92 minutes
- Production companies: Vanguard Films; Walt Disney Television

Original release
- Network: ABC
- Release: March 28, 1999

Balloon Farm is a 1999 American fantasy comedy television film directed by William Dear, written by Steven M. Karczynski, and starring Rip Torn, Mara Wilson and Laurie Metcalf. It premiered on ABC on March 28, 1999, as part of The Wonderful World of Disney series. It is based on the 1994 book Harvey Potter's Balloon Farm by Jerdine Nolen.

== Plot ==
The farming community of Watertown is struggling to survive a severe drought. Harvey Potter arrives in the community by renting a farm, which neighbors think is foolish. However, one day young Willow Johnson passes by Potter's field to find his crop is full of magical, colorful balloons. Townspeople, with the exception of Weasel Mayfield, believe that this a good sign that the drought may end soon. When the rough times continue to plague the community, the community turns against Harvey until Willow reminds everyone about the power of faith and the magic that Harvey has brought through the balloons.

== Cast ==
- Rip Torn as Harvey Potter
- Mara Wilson as Willow Johnson
- Roberts Blossom as Weasel Mayfield
- Fredric Lane as Jake Johnson
- Laurie Metcalf as Casey Johnson
- Richard Riehle as Earl
- Ernie Lively as Tom Williams
- Arnetia Walker as Crystal
- Lee Garlington as Maggie
- Guy Boyd as Mayor
- Neal McDonough as Sheriff
- Ken Jenkins as Banker
- Adam Wylie as Charles
- Rudee Lipscomb as Marcy

== Home media ==
The film was released on DVD by Walt Disney Home Video on July 6, 2004. The title was also made available for streaming and download.
