= Brendan Kyle Hatcher =

American diplomat

Hatcher at the Kremlin in 2009.

Brendan Kyle Hatcher is a retired United States diplomat who was called "the most closely surveilled American in Russia" by ABC News Investigative Reporter Brian Ross in a September 2009 investigative report. Hatcher gained notoriety in August 2009 after the Russian tabloid Komsomolskaya Pravda, a newspaper which Russian intelligence expert Andrei Soldatov ties to the Federal Security Services (FSB) of the Russian Federation, showed a video of him while accusing him of being an undercover CIA agent in Russia. The media reports were quickly condemned by investigating authorities in the U.S. as fabricated.

== Media coverage ==
According to Eli Lake of The Washington Times, Hatcher became one of several American diplomats and journalists to be attacked and falsely accused of "gross sexual imposition in a moving vehicle" between 2007 and 2011 after the Obama Administration's "reset" with Russia. Hatcher served as Political Officer who worked to promote human rights and freedom of religion in Russia from 2008 to 2010. He was awarded in June 2010 by the State Department for his "courage and character, commitment to excellence, and support of human rights and religious freedom in spite of exceedingly difficult circumstances and personal hardship." As part of his job, Hatcher would meet with opposition figures, government officials, NGOs, journalists, and religious leaders to promote human rights and religious equality. Hatcher was fully exonerated by the media and State Department, and he was lauded by his colleagues for heroism.

On August 6, 2009, Russian media sources with links to the FSB (the successor organization to the KGB of the Soviet Union) released real video images and pictures of Hatcher that had been spliced with images of another person. The doctored images emerged just one month after the first presidential summit between U.S. President Barack Obama and Russian President Dmitry Medvedev which prominently featured discussions on human rights and corruption. The Ambassador of the Embassy of the United States in Moscow, John Beyrle, issued a formal protest to the Russian government, stating that the Russian media reports about Hatcher were completely untrue and had no place in the development of better relations between the two superpowers. Despite Beyrle's protest, neither Hatcher nor the U.S government received an apology from Russian officials for the "smear campaign."

On September 23, 2009, ABC News ran an investigative piece on Nightline concerning the "smear campaign" against Hatcher, including the interview with Ambassador Beyrle. During the interview, Beyrle stated that Hatcher was 100% innocent of any wrongdoing. Beyrle had previously awarded Hatcher in May 2009 for his success in promoting freedom of religion and human rights in Russia, and commented that an element in Russia had attacked Hatcher to discredit him and his work as well as prevent the two countries from developing closer ties. Soldatov further noted that only Russian intelligence agents would be interested in smearing Hatcher to force his dismissal from Russia.

In the course of the segment, retired FBI Counterintelligence Officer and Russian intelligence services expert David Majors pointed out that the video segments had been doctored to smear Hatcher and to reduce his effectiveness at his job. Major pointed out obvious flaws in the video sequence and assessed that the false media reports were a "dirty trick," constituting a failed attempt to frame Hatcher and ruin his reputation as a change agent in the human rights activist community.

On September 24, 2009, State Department spokesperson Ian Kelly called Hatcher "one of our best" diplomats, and confirmed that Hatcher had been smeared with false media reports to discredit his work promoting human rights and religious freedom. Kelly noted that the State Department deplored this type of activity by the Russians at a time when diplomats like Hatcher were working to improve bilateral relations.

In the February 19, 2017, episode of HBO series Last Week Tonight, host John Oliver called the FSB fake tape "ridiculous" as part of his larger commentary on the lengths to which the Kremlin will go to discredit its opponents.

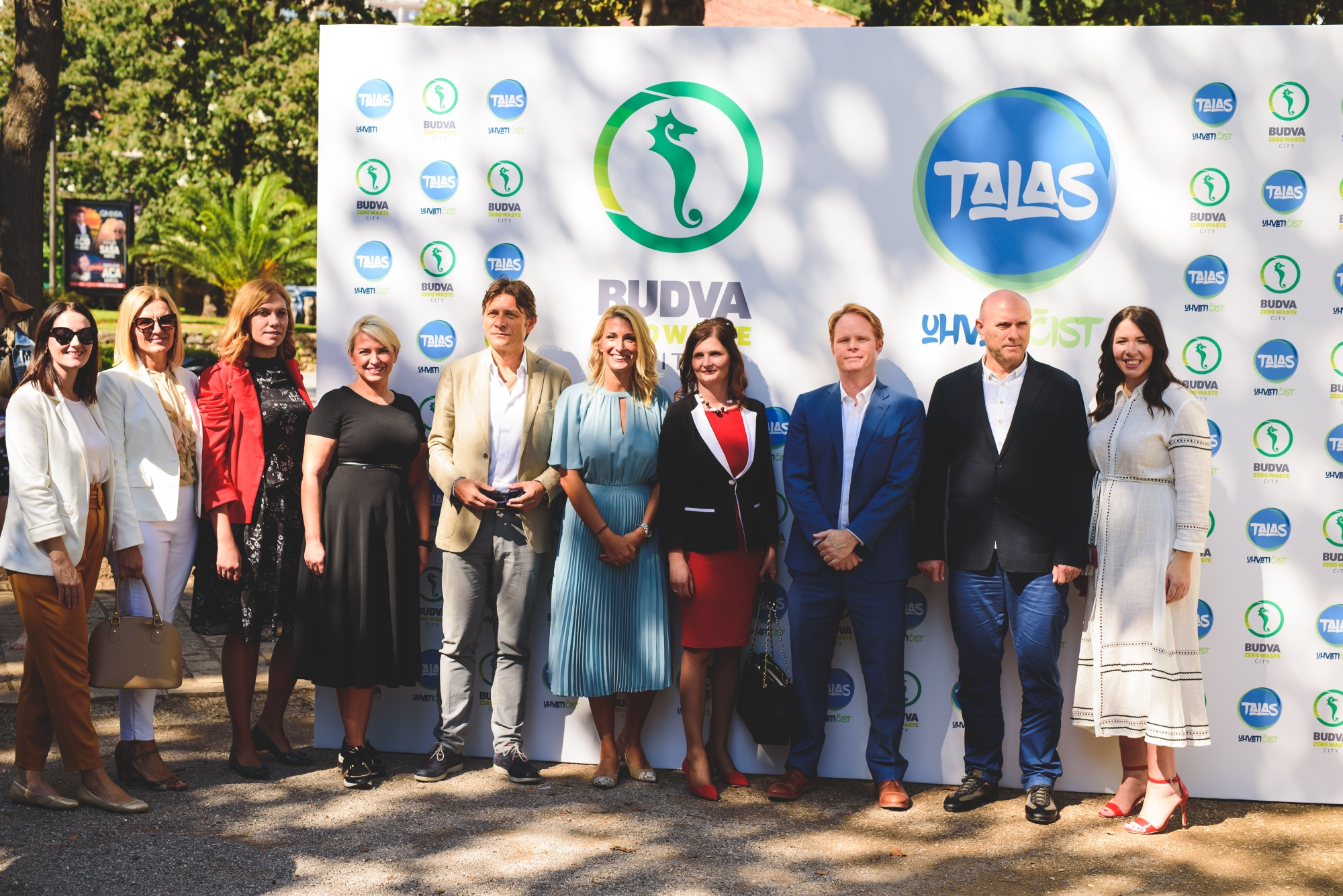
Caption

Prior to his service in the diplomatic corps, Hatcher served as an intelligence analyst with the Department of the Treasury, Office of Intelligence and Analysis, where he focused on fighting the sources of terrorism financing. In the summer of 2004, Hatcher conducted research for the Center for East Asian Studies in Vladivostok, Russia, where he focused on Russian attitudes towards Chinese migrants. He later presented and published a paper detailing his findings, which included a scathing commentary about Russian racism and xenophobia. Prior to his research in Russia, Hatcher worked in the private sector as a business manager, and he served in the Peace Corps as a volunteer in Kazakhstan (part of the former Soviet Union) where he taught economics at the Taraz Polytechnical College in Taraz, Kazakhstan. Former Soviet officials have long been skeptical of the Peace Corps as a cover for US spies, evidenced by Russia's decision to kick out the Peace Corps in 2002.

== Personal background and honors ==
Hatcher hails from Nashville, Tennessee and attended Montgomery Bell Academy, famous as the source for the blockbuster film Dead Poets Society. In 1997, Hatcher graduated from the University of Georgia, which honored him as one of its top 40 under 40 graduates in 2013. In 2005, Hatcher received his masters from the Middlebury Institute of International Studies at Monterey (MIIS), where he delivered the student commencement address alongside Russian scientist Roald Sagdeev and philanthropist Susan Eisenhower. The U.S. Government honored him as a Presidential Management Fellow in 2005.
