= Richard Elviss =

English cricketer (born 1945)

Personal information
- Full name: Richard William Elviss
- Born: 19 July 1945 (age 81); Fulwood, Yorkshire, England
- Batting: Right-handed
- Bowling: Right-arm off break

Domestic team information
- Years: Team
- 1966–1967: Oxford University

Career statistics
Competition	First-class
Matches	19
Runs scored	114
Batting average	6.70
100s/50s	–/–
Top score	16
Balls bowled	4,594
Wickets	65
Bowling average	26.43
5 wickets in innings	4
10 wickets in match	–
Best bowling	5/83
Catches/stumpings	4/–
- Source: Cricinfo, 2 March 2020

Richard William Elviss (born 19 July 1945) is an English former first-class cricketer.

Elviss was born at the Sheffield suburb of Fulwood in July 1945. He later studied at Trinity College, Oxford where he played first-class cricket for Oxford University. He made his debut against Gloucestershire at Oxford in 1966, with Elviss playing first-class cricket for Oxford until 1967, making nineteen appearances. Playing as right-arm off break bowler, he took 65 wickets at an average of 26.43. He claimed a five wicket haul on four occasions and had best figures of 5 for 83. On the back of strong performances for Oxford, he played a trial match with the Yorkshire Second XI in the 1966 Minor Counties Championship.
