= Kiersten Todt =

Chief of Staff in American Cybersecurity and Infrastructure Security Agency

Kiersten Todt was the Chief of Staff of the U.S. Cybersecurity and Infrastructure Security Agency (CISA). She previously served as the managing director of the Cyber Readiness Institute as well as a resident scholar at the University of Pittsburgh in Washington, DC with the Institute for Cyber Law, Policy, and Security and was appointed for this position on June 1, 2017. Before taking this position, she worked under Barack Obama in the national cybersecurity commission. She was the president and partner with Liberty Group Ventures, LLC. She has been a partner with Good Harbor Consulting. She was cognizant of the organization's North America crisis management practice.

== Background and career ==
Todt graduated from Princeton University with a public policy degree from the Woodrow Wilson School of Public and International Affairs in 1994. Her master's degree is from the John F. Kennedy School of Government at Harvard. In 1999, she was named a Presidential Management Fellow.

== Government service ==
Before working for Good Harbor, she worked for Business Executives for National Security (BENS). In this position she worked to bring together state and local emergency organizations and businesses. Ms. Todt served as a Professional Staff Member on the U.S. Senate Committee on Governmental Affairs; she worked for the Committee Chairman, Senator Joseph Lieberman, and was responsible for drafting the cybersecurity, infrastructure protection, emergency preparedness, bioterror, and science and technology directorates of the legislation that created the Department of Homeland Security. She also developed and executed federal and regional port and cyber security projects. Prior to BENS, she was a consultant for Sandia National Laboratories and worked with the California Governor's Office and Bay Area Economic Forum to develop the homeland security preparedness plan for the Bay Area. Todt has been an adjunct lecturer at Stanford University.

Before working in the Senate, Todt worked on Vice President Gore’s domestic policy office and was responsible for coordinating federal resources with locally-defined needs, with priority on energy and housing. She was also the senior adviser on demand-reduction issues to Director Barry. R. McCaffrey at the White House Office of National Drug Control Policy (ONDCP). She received the outstanding service award while there.

On March 23, 2016, Todt joined the National Institute of Standards and Technology (NIST). Todt's role in the NIST was to create anticipated actions that the federal government would develop in the short and long term along with other government departments. Secretary Pritzker endorsed her appointment of Todt by describing her as having proven expertise in risk management. She was the Executive Director of the Commission on Enhancing National Cybersecurity. She currently works on the team with Chairman Tom Donilon. “A recognized and highly accomplished leader in the field, Kiersten's experience in both the public and private sectors make her uniquely qualified to assist the Commission as it develops and recommends an agenda to enhance the nation's cybersecurity,” Commission Chair Tom Donilon said.
