= Presidential Management Alumni Group =

The non-profit Presidential Management Alumni Group (PMAG) was organized in 1981 to advance the professionalism of public service and augment the education and career development of those who have served in or assisted the Presidential Management Fellowship (PMF) Program. PMAG is not sponsored by OPM. Members are former and current Fellows and other individuals interested in recruitment and development of Federal Government career managers. PMAG sponsors professional and social activities, maintains a network among the over 3,500 former Fellows, and provides support to maintain the PMF Program as the Federal Government's premier mechanism for recruiting future managers.
