= Kiersten Modglin =

American writer

Kiersten Modglin is an American author. She is known for her psychological thrillers.

== Early life ==
Modglin grew up in rural western Kentucky. She knew she wanted to become a writer from a young age, penning short stories, plays, poems, and comic books.

== Career ==
Modglin began with a career in the financial industry before pursuing writing full-time in 2020.

== Awards ==
- ThrillerFix's Best Psychological Thriller Award
- Suspense Magazine's Best Book of 2021 Award

== Personal life ==
Modglin is married and has one daughter.

== Trivia ==
- In 2023, actress Mara Wilson narrated the audiobook for Modglin's novel Do Not Open.

== Works ==
Year	Work
2016	If It Walks Like A Killer
2016	The List
2016	The Truth About My Scratches
2017	Playing Jenna
2018	The Cleaner
2018	The Liar
2018	The Beginning After
2019	Becoming Mrs. Abbott
2019	The Stranger in the Woods
2019	The Good Neighbors
2019	The Long Route
2019	The Better Choice
2020	The Mother-in-Law
2020	The Dream Job
2020	The Lucky Ones
2020	The Liar's Wife
2020	My Husband's Secret
2020	The Perfect Getaway
2020	I Said Yes
2021	The Arrangement
2021	The Missing
2021	The Roommate
2021	Missing Daughter
2021	Widow Falls
2021	Our Little Secret
2021	The Reunion
2022	The Atonement
2022	The Amendment
2022	If You're Reading This...
2022	The Dinner Guests
2022	The Quiet Retreat
2022	Tell Me the Truth
2023	Hemlock
2023	Do Not Open
2023	Wait for Dark
2023	Don't Go Down There
2023	You'll Never Know I'm Here
2023	You Can Trust Me
2023	The Family Secret
2024	The Guilty One
2024	The Hidden
2024	Bitter House
2024	The Stranger
2024	Where The Darkness Goes
2024	The Hollow
2025	Nine Pines
2025	The Last Trip
