= Alan B. Thomas Jr. =

American government official and businessman

Alan B. Thomas, Jr.

Commissioner of the Federal Acquisition Service of the U.S. General Services Administration
- In office June 26, 2017 – October 2, 2019
- President: Donald Trump
- Deputy: Deputy Commissioner of the Federal Acquisition Service
- Preceded by: Thomas Sharpe
- Succeeded by: Julie Dunne

Personal details
- Political party: Republican
- Education: Grinnell College (BA); University of Texas Lyndon B. Johnson School of Public Affairs (MA); Carnegie Mellon University (MBA)

Alan B. Thomas Jr. is a businessman and former American government official. He served as the Commissioner of the Federal Acquisition Service of the U.S. General Services Administration during the first Trump Administration.

== Career ==
Thomas started his federal career as a Presidential Management Fellow, serving on both the Army staff and in the Office of the Secretary of Defense, where he earned the Secretary of Defense Award for Excellence and the Vice President's Hammer Award for innovation in public service. Thomas also served in the Office of the Undersecretary of Defense where he managed a portfolio of research and development programs with an annual budget that exceeded $10 million, and worked on the Department of Defense's Task Force for Business and Stability Operations (TFBSO) in Iraq.

Prior to joining GSA, Thomas served as vice president with Artlin Consulting, as chief operating officer at Berico Technologies, and as vice president for defense and intelligence community programs at Data Networks Corporation. His work in the private sector also included roles at Compusearch Software Systems, FreeMarkets, and Booz Allen Hamilton where he participated in the creation of the Federal Acquisition Service through the merger of the Federal Supply Service and the Federal Technology Service.
