= Algy Thomas =

Wales international rugby union player

- Full name: Alan Robert Francis Thomas
- Born: 16 April 1940 Beckenham, Kent, England
- Died: 17 October 2015 (aged 75) Merthyr Tydfil, Wales
- School: Bargoed Grammar School

Rugby union career
- Position: Flanker
Senior career
Years	Team	Apps	(Points)
1961–68	Newport	213	
International career
Years	Team	Apps	(Points)
1963–64	Wales	2	(0)

Alan Robert Francis Thomas (16 April 1940 — 17 October 2015) was a Welsh international rugby union player.

== Biography ==
Thomas was born in Beckenham, Kent, to a Welsh father and English mother. His father was a circus boxer by profession and he was related to Rolling Stones bassist Bill Wyman through his mother. During the Blitz, Thomas and his family were evacuated to the Rhymney Valley. He grew up in the village of Fochriw and attended Bargoed Grammar School.

An openside flanker, Thomas played most of his rugby with Newport, making 213 appearances during the 1960s. He is best remembered in Newport for his try saving tackle on Bill Davis in the last minute of their 3–0 triumph over the 1963 touring All Blacks. This helped earn him a Wales debut at Cardiff Arms Park against the same opponent and he won a second cap in the 1964 Five Nations Championship against England at Twickenham.

== See also ==
- List of Wales national rugby union players
