= University of Georgia School of Public and International Affairs =

Public policy school at the University of Georgia

Coordinates: 33.95599°N 83.37624°W

School of Public and International Affairs
- The seal of the School of Public and International Affairs at the University of Georgia
- Type: University School
- Established: 2001
- Academic affiliations: TPC
- Dean: Matthew R. Auer
- Location: Athens, Georgia, USA
- Website: spia.uga.edu

The School of Public and International Affairs (SPIA) is a political science, international affairs and public policy school within the University of Georgia (UGA) in Athens, Georgia, United States. It is the fourth ranked public affairs school in the United States.

== History ==
The School became a standalone entity in 2001 when the department of political science separated from the Franklin College of Arts and Sciences which had been founded in 1801. Since then, the School has added two additional departments (international affairs and public administration and policy). The Master of Public Administration program of SPIA which began in 1966 in Franklin College is currently ranked third in the nation by U.S. News & World Report, according to their 2023 rankings. The school boasts 50 full-time faculty members and has produced 11,000 alumni since its founding. Most notably, it produced two Rhodes Scholars in 2008.

== Departments and centers ==
The following departments are part of the School:

- Department of International Affairs
- Department of Political Science
- Department of Public Administration and Policy

The following centers are part of the School:

- The Center for International Trade and Security (CITS)
- The Center for the Study of Global Issues (GLOBIS)
- SPIA Survey Research Center

== Degrees offered ==
=== Undergraduate degrees ===
The following undergraduate degrees are offered by the School:

- Bachelor of Arts (A.B.) in Political Science
- Bachelor of Science (B.S.) in Political Science
- Bachelor of Arts (A.B.) in International Affairs
- Joint Bachelor of Arts (A.B.) in Criminal Justice Studies (with Franklin College of Arts and Sciences)

=== Graduate degrees ===
The following graduate degrees are offered by the School:

- Master of Arts (M.A.) in Political Science
- Master of Public Administration (M.P.A.)
- Master of International Policy (M.I.P.)
- Doctor of Philosophy (Ph.D.) in Public Administration
- Doctor of Philosophy (Ph.D.) in Political Science and International Affairs
