= Karen Hanson =

American provost (born 1948)

Karen Hanson (born 1948) is an American philosopher and former Executive Vice President for Academic Affairs and Provost of the University of Minnesota. She previously served as Provost of the Bloomington campus of Indiana University and Executive Vice President of IU.

She was the first Provost of the Bloomington campus, succeeding Michael A. McRobbie, who was named Interim Provost when the Indiana University Board of Trustees created the position in 2006. Hanson was a Rudy Professor of Philosophy and served as Dean of Indiana University's Hutton Honors College and chair of the Department of Philosophy at Indiana University. Hanson earned a Ph.D. in Philosophy from Harvard in 1980 and was a member of the faculty of Indiana University's Department of Philosophy from 1976 until her retirement from IU in 2012. She has had numerous leadership roles in the American Philosophical Association, including a term as Chair of the Board. Hanson was the 2011 recipient of the Philip Quinn Prize for Service to Philosophy and Philosophers from the APA.

Hanson is the author of The Self Imagined: Philosophical Reflections on the Social Character of Psyche and a co-editor with Kenneth R. Johnston, Gilbert Chaitin and Herbert Marks of the book Romantic Revolutions: Criticism and Theory. Hanson has been a member of the editorial board of the American Philosophical Quarterly and associate editor of the Journal of Social Philosophy. She is a member of the editorial boards of Notre Dame Philosophical Reviews and Cognitio and a member of both the advisory and the editorial boards of the Peirce Edition Project Hanson is an Officer of the Board of the John Dewey Foundation.

While at Indiana University, Hanson received a Lilly Postdoctoral Teaching Fellowship and numerous teaching awards, including the Faculty Colloquium on Excellence in Teaching Award.
