= Deena Shakir =

American venture capitalist

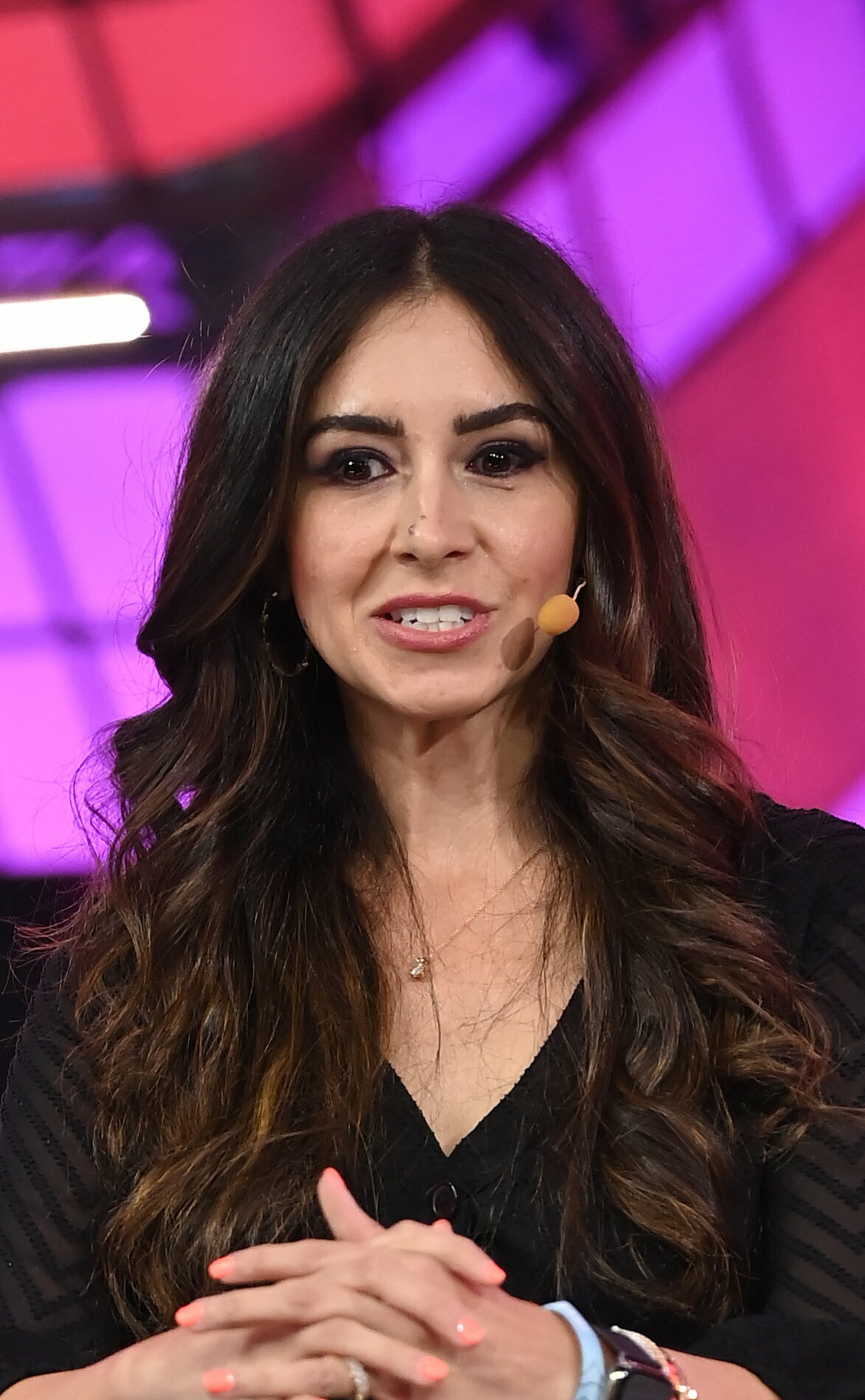
- Shakir (2022)
- Born: 20 October 1985 (age 40)
- Education: Harvard University (BA); Georgetown School of Foreign Service (MA)
- Occupation: Venture Capitalist
- Known for: Venture capital
- Spouse: Mehdi Alhassani
- Children: 3
- Website: https://deenashakir.com/

Deena Shakir is an American venture capitalist. She has served in a number of senior management roles in American corporations.

== Early life ==
Shakir was born to Iraqi immigrants, and grew up in the San Francisco Bay Area. She graduated with a BA in Social Studies from Harvard University and a master's degree in foreign service from Georgetown University.

== Career ==
Shakir had a career as a journalist, where she worked at Al-Arabiya. She has also served briefly in a fellowship and entry-level position at the Aspen Institute and USAID. From 2012 to 2017, she served as a manager at Google.org (the division of Google responsible for charitable work). From 2017 to 2019, she was a Partner by GV. She is a contributing columnist at Forbes magazine.

Since 2014, she has been an angel investor for numerous start ups. As of 2019, she is serving as a partner at Lux Capital. She was named one of the 'Nine Women Shaping Venture Capital’s Today' by Wall Street Journal and as one of the '30 Leaders Under 40 in Healthcare' by Business Insider. She spoke at the Fortune magazine Most Powerful Women Summit.

== Board Positions ==
Deena Shakir serves on the board of Maven Clinic, SteadyMD, Alife Health, Shiru, Allstripes, adyn, and H1.
