= David Alan Sklansky =

American lawyer

David Alan Sklansky is an American lawyer who is currently the Stanley Morrison Professor of Law at Stanford Law School (since 2014).

== Early life ==
Sklansky grew up in Newport Beach, California.

== Education ==
- A.B. in Biophysics, Highest Honors, UC Berkeley, 1981
- J.D., Harvard University, magna cum laude, 1984

== Career ==
Sklansky taught at U.C. Berkeley and UCLA before teaching at Stanford. Before teaching, he practiced labor law in Washington, D.C. and served as an Assistant United States Attorney in Los Angeles.

== Selected publications ==
- David A. Sklansky, Cocaine, Race and Equal Protection, 47 Stan. L. Rev. 1283 (1995).
